= 2025 Seattle Mariners season =

2025 Seattle Mariners
- American League West champions
- League: American League
- Division: West
- Ballpark: T-Mobile Park
- City: Seattle, Washington
- Record: 90–72 (.556)
- Divisional place: 1st
- Owners: Baseball Club of Seattle, LP, represented by CEO John Stanton
- President of baseball operations: Jerry Dipoto
- General manager: Justin Hollander
- Manager: Dan Wilson
- Average attendance: 31,333
- Television: Root Sports Northwest (Aaron Goldsmith, Jay Buhner, Dave Valle, Angie Mentink, Ryan Rowland-Smith, Bill Krueger, Jen Mueller, Brad Adam)
- Radio: ESPN-710; Seattle Mariners Radio Network (Rick Rizzs, Gary Hill Jr., Mark McLemore, Ken Phelps, Angie Mentink, Ryan Rowland-Smith, Shannon Drayer)

The 2025 Seattle Mariners season was the 49th season in franchise history and their 26th full season (27th overall) at T-Mobile Park, their home ballpark in Seattle, Washington. The Mariners won their first American League (AL) West divisional title and Division Series since 2001.

Catcher Cal Raleigh had an unprecedented home run hitting season, finishing the regular season with 60 home runs. He broke the franchise record for home runs (set by Ken Griffey Jr.) and major league records for home runs by a catcher and switch hitter in a season. He also won the Home Run Derby, which Griffey won three times.

Raleigh, Randy Arozarena, Julio Rodríguez, Bryan Woo, and Andrés Muñoz were selected to play in the All-Star Game. Raleigh was named the AL Player of the Month for June, and Muñoz was named the AL Reliever of the Month for March/April. Raleigh won the Silver Slugger Award, and he and Rodríguez were named to the All-MLB Team. Woo and Muñoz were named to the All-MLB second team.

On August 9, the Mariners retired the number 51 worn by Ichiro Suzuki, following his induction into the National Baseball Hall of Fame in July. This was the fourth number retired by the team. The Mariners played in the MLB Little League Classic on August 17, losing to the New York Mets.

The Mariners clinched a postseason berth for the first time since 2022 on September 23, with a victory over the Colorado Rockies. The next night, the team won the AL West division for the fourth time in franchise history.

The Mariners defeated the sixth seed Detroit Tigers in the AL Division Series (ALDS). With their win in Game 2, the Mariners won their first home postseason game since Game 5 in the 2001 ALDS. The Mariners won the series in 5 games, reaching the AL Championship Series for the first time since 2001, where they faced the Toronto Blue Jays. Despite winning three of the first five games, the Mariners squandered 2–0 and 3–2 series leads, losing in Game 7 after allowing a go-ahead home run to George Springer. The loss extended the Mariners' drought of never winning the AL pennant.

The Mariners drew an average home attendance of 31,333, declining for the second consecutive year.

== Offseason ==
=== Transactions ===
- November 1: The Mariners declined Jorge Polanco's $12 million option for the 2025 season.
- November 15: The Mariners re-signed Casey Lawrence to a minor league contract.
- November 19: The Tampa Bay Rays traded infielder Austin Shenton to the Mariners for cash. Shenton took the roster spot formerly held by reliever J.T. Chargois, who was traded with Shenton to the Rays in 2021.
- November 22: The Mariners did not tender contracts to Chargois, Josh Rojas, Austin Voth, and Sam Haggerty, making them free agents. All four players signed with different teams.
- November 26: The Mariners announced their coaching staff for 2025. Changes from the end of 2024 included Kevin Seitzer replacing Edgar Martínez as hitting coach, Manny Acta moving from third base coach to bench coach, and Eric Young Jr. becoming first base coach. (The team's previous bench coach, Brant Brown, was fired at the end of May 2024.)
- December 14: The Mariners signed Sauryn Lao to a minor league contract.
- December 19: The Mariners claimed catcher Nick Raposo off waivers.
- January 8, 2025: Reliever Hagen Danner was claimed off waivers.
- January 13: Donovan Solano signed a one-year, $3.5 million contract. Austin Kitchen was designated for assignment and later outrighted to the Triple-A Tacoma Rainiers.
- January 14: The Chicago Cubs traded infielder Miles Mastrobuoni to the Mariners for cash. Raposo was designated for assignment. He cleared waivers and was sent outright to Tacoma on January 17.
- January 15: The Baltimore Orioles traded catcher Blake Hunt to the Mariners for cash. Samad Taylor was designated for assignment and subsequently sent outright to Tacoma on January 21.
- January 21: The Kansas City Royals traded reliever Will Klein to the Mariners for international bonus pool space. The Mariners designated pitcher Tyler Jay, who had been a waiver claim earlier in January. Jay was outrighted to Tacoma.
- January 28: The Mariners signed pitcher Luis F. Castillo to a minor league contract.
- February 3: The Mariners re-signed Polanco to a one-year, $7.75 million contract with up to $3.5 million in incentives. On that day, the Cincinnati Reds also traded reliever Casey Legumina to the Mariners for cash. Cade Marlowe and Jhonathan Díaz were both designated for assignment, though both remained with the organization on minor league deals.
- February 20: The Mariners signed first baseman Rowdy Tellez to a minor league contract.
- March 2: Pitcher Jackson Kowar was placed on the 60-day injured list. Reliever Seth Martinez was claimed off waivers from the Miami Marlins. Martinez returned to Miami on March 15.
- March 23: The Mariners released outfielder Mitch Haniger.
- March 25: Catcher Cal Raleigh signed a six-year, $105 million contract extension.

== Spring training ==
Spring Training non-roster invitees

Player	Position	2024 team(s)
Peyton Alford	Pitcher	Arkansas Travelers
Luis F. Castillo	Pitcher	Orix Buffaloes
Tyler Cleveland	Pitcher	Everett AquaSox
Hunter Cranton	Pitcher	Modesto Nuts
Logan Evans	Pitcher	Arkansas Travelers
Neftali Feliz	Pitcher	Caliente de Durango/Leones de Yucatan
Josh Fleming	Pitcher	Pittsburgh Pirates
Shintaro Fujinami	Pitcher	Syracuse Mets
Brandyn Garcia	Pitcher	Arkansas Travelers
Jesse Hahn	Pitcher	Oklahoma City Baseball Club/Tacoma Rainiers
Austin Kitchen	Pitcher	Miami Marlins
Sauryn Lao	Pitcher	Oklahoma City Baseball Club
Casey Lawrence	Pitcher	Tacoma Rainiers
Adonis Medina	Pitcher	Rochester Red Wings
Drew Pomeranz	Pitcher	Oklahoma City Baseball Club
Dauris Valdez	Pitcher	none
Josh Caron	Catcher	Modesto Nuts
Connor Charping	Catcher	Everett AquaSox
Harry Ford	Catcher	Arkansas Travelers
Jacob Nottingham	Catcher	Olmecas de Tabasco/Charros de Jalisco
Nick Raposo	Catcher	Memphis Redbirds/Buffalo Bisons
Michael Arroyo	Infielder	Everett AquaSox
Nick Dunn	Second baseman	Memphis Redbirds
Colt Emerson	Shortstop	Everett AquaSox
Brock Rodden	Infielder	Arkansas Travelers
Rowdy Tellez	First baseman	Pittsburgh Pirates
Ben Williamson	Third baseman	Arkansas Travelers
Cole Young	Second baseman	Arkansas Travelers
Lazaro Montes	Outfielder	Everett AquaSox
Spencer Packard	Outfielder	Tacoma Rainiers
Rhylan Thomas	Outfielder	Syracuse Mets/Tacoma Rainiers
Samad Taylor	Utility player	Seattle Mariners

== Season standings ==
=== American League West ===
AL West
Team	W	L	Pct.	GB	Home	Road
Seattle Mariners	90	72	.556	—	51‍–‍30	39‍–‍42
Houston Astros	87	75	.537	3	46‍–‍35	41‍–‍40
Texas Rangers	81	81	.500	9	48‍–‍33	33‍–‍48
Athletics	76	86	.469	14	36‍–‍45	40‍–‍41
Los Angeles Angels	72	90	.444	18	39‍–‍42	33‍–‍48

=== American League Wild Card ===
Division leaders
Team	W	L	Pct.
Toronto Blue Jays	94	68	.580
Seattle Mariners	90	72	.556
Cleveland Guardians	88	74	.543

Wild Card teams (Top 3 teams qualify for postseason)
Team	W	L	Pct.	GB
New York Yankees	94	68	.580	+7
Boston Red Sox	89	73	.549	+2
Detroit Tigers	87	75	.537	—
Houston Astros	87	75	.537	—
Kansas City Royals	82	80	.506	5
Texas Rangers	81	81	.500	6
Tampa Bay Rays	77	85	.475	10
Athletics	76	86	.469	11
Baltimore Orioles	75	87	.463	12
Los Angeles Angels	72	90	.444	15
Minnesota Twins	70	92	.432	17
Chicago White Sox	60	102	.370	27

=== Record vs. opponents ===
==== Record vs. American League ====
2025 American League record Source: MLB Standings Grid – 2025
Team	ATH	BAL	BOS	CWS	CLE	DET	HOU	KC	LAA	MIN	NYY	SEA	TB	TEX	TOR	NL
Athletics	—	4–2	3–3	5–1	2–4	4–2	8–5	4–2	4–9	4–3	2–4	6–7	3–3	5–8	2–5	20–28
Baltimore	2–4	—	5–8	6–0	3–4	1–5	3–4	2–4	5–1	0–6	4–9	5–1	7–6	2–4	6–7	24–24
Boston	3–3	8–5	—	4–3	4–2	2–4	4–2	4–2	1–5	3–3	9–4	3–3	10–3	3–4	5–8	26–22
Chicago	1–5	0–6	3–4	—	2–11	5–8	3–3	3–10	3–3	8–5	1–6	1–5	4–2	2–4	3–3	21–27
Cleveland	4–2	4–3	2–4	11–2	—	8–5	4–2	8–5	3–3	9–4	3–3	2–4	5–2	2–4	3–3	20–28
Detroit	2–4	5–1	4–2	8–5	5–8	—	4–2	9–4	5–2	8–5	4–2	2–4	3–3	2–4	3–4	23–25
Houston	5–8	4–3	2–4	3–3	2–4	2–4	—	3–3	8–5	5–1	3-3	5–8	3–4	7–6	4–2	31–17
Kansas City	2–4	4–2	2–4	10–3	5–8	4–9	3–3	—	3–3	7–6	0–6	3–4	3–3	6-1	4–2	26–22
Los Angeles	9–4	1–5	5–1	3–3	3–3	2–5	5–8	3–3	—	2–4	3–4	4–9	3–3	5–8	2–4	22–26
Minnesota	3–4	6–0	3–3	5–8	4–9	5–8	1–5	6–7	4–2	—	2–4	3–4	3–3	3–3	2–4	20–28
New York	4–2	9–4	4–9	6–1	3–3	2–4	3–3	6–0	4–3	4–2	—	5–1	9–4	4–2	5–8	26–22
Seattle	7–6	1–5	3–3	5–1	4–2	4–2	8–5	4–3	9–4	4–3	1–5	—	3–3	10–3	2–4	25–23
Tampa Bay	3–3	6–7	3–10	2–4	2–5	3–3	4–3	3–3	3–3	3–3	4–9	3–3	—	3–3	7–6	28–20
Texas	8–5	4–2	4–3	4–2	4–2	4–2	6–7	1-6	8–5	3–3	2–4	3–10	3–3	—	2–4	25–23
Toronto	5–2	7–6	8–5	3–3	3–3	4–3	2–4	2–4	4–2	4–2	8–5	4–2	6–7	4–2	—	30–18

Updated with the results of all games through September 28, 2025.

==== Record vs. National League ====
2025 American League record vs. National League Source: MLB Standings
Team	AZ	ATL	CHC	CIN	COL	LAD	MIA	MIL	NYM	PHI	PIT	SD	SF	STL	WSH
Athletics	1–2	2–1	0–3	3–0	2–1	1–2	2–1	1–2	1–2	1–2	1–2	1–2	1–5	1–2	2–1
Baltimore	1–2	3–0	1–2	1–2	2–1	2–1	1–2	1–2	2–1	1–2	3–0	3–0	1–2	1–2	1–5
Boston	1–2	3–3	1–2	2–1	3–0	2–1	2–1	0–3	2–1	1–2	1–2	1–2	1–2	3–0	3–0
Chicago	1–2	1–2	1–5	2–1	2–1	0–3	2–1	1–2	1–2	2–1	3–0	1–2	2–1	0–3	2–1
Cleveland	1–2	0–3	0–3	1–5	2–1	1–2	2–1	2–1	3–0	1–2	3–0	0–3	2–1	0–3	2–1
Detroit	3–0	0–3	2–1	1–2	3–0	0–3	1–2	1–2	1–2	1–2	2–4	2–1	3–0	2–1	1–2
Houston	3–0	2–1	2–1	2–1	4–2	3–0	2–1	1–2	2–1	3–0	2–1	2–1	0–3	1–2	2–1
Kansas City	2–1	2–1	2–1	1–2	3–0	1–2	1–2	1–2	1–2	1–2	3–0	1–2	2–1	3–3	2–1
Los Angeles	2–1	2–1	0–3	1–2	1–2	6–0	1–2	0–3	0–3	2–1	1–2	1–2	2–1	2–1	1–2
Minnesota	1–2	0–3	2–1	1–2	1–2	1–2	1–2	2–4	2–1	1–2	2–1	2–1	3–0	0–3	1–2
New York	1–2	2–1	1–2	1–2	2–1	1–2	0–3	3–0	3–3	1–2	2–1	2–1	1–2	3–0	3–0
Seattle	0–3	2–1	2–1	2–1	3–0	0–3	2–1	1–2	1–2	0–3	3–0	5–1	0–3	3–0	1–2
Tampa Bay	2–1	2–1	1–2	0–3	2–1	1–2	3–3	2–1	3–0	0–3	2–1	3–0	2–1	2–1	3–0
Texas	2–4	3–0	1–2	2–1	3–0	1–2	0–3	3–0	2–1	0–3	2–1	1–2	1–2	2–1	2–1
Toronto	2–1	2–1	2–1	2–1	3–0	1–2	2–1	1–2	0–3	2–4	1–2	3–0	3–0	3–0	3–0

Updated with the results of all games through September 28, 2025.

=== Season summary ===
==== March/April ====
The Mariners started poorly, going 4–8 to begin the season, including being swept by the San Francisco Giants. Starting with an 8th inning grand slam by Randy Arozarena on April 9, the team's performance improved enough to lead the AL West at the end of the month. The team won their last seven series of the month. Rowdy Tellez hit home runs in three consecutive games at Rogers Centre, his former home ballpark, to help win a series against the Toronto Blue Jays. The Mariners then defeated Boston Red Sox ace Garrett Crochet in another series win. Several players had career-best performances, with Dylan Moore and Jorge Polanco winning back-to-back AL Player of the Week awards. Their offense, along with Cal Raleigh's 10 home runs, carried the Mariners. Closer Andrés Muñoz tied for the MLB lead with 11 saves and did not allow a run, winning the AL Reliever of the Month Award.

The team was beset by injuries: starting pitcher George Kirby and relievers Matt Brash and Troy Taylor started the season on the injured list, and regulars Víctor Robles, Logan Gilbert, Ryan Bliss, Moore, Luke Raley, and Gregory Santos ended April injured. Polanco also dealt with a knee injury that prevented him from switch hitting or playing defense. As part of the team's reinforcements, Ben Williamson, Logan Evans, and Sauryn Lao all made their major league debuts.

==== May ====
The Mariners won their ninth consecutive series with a five-run deficit to defeat the Athletics 6–5 on May 8. However, the team then lost five of six games at home, including being swept by the Toronto Blue Jays. In the final game of the homestand, Aaron Judge of the New York Yankees hit his league-leading 15th home run. Reversing that streak, the Mariners then won five of six on the road, including sweeping the San Diego Padres to open the Vedder Cup and winning two against the Chicago White Sox. Julio Rodríguez hit a decisive grand slam on May 19.

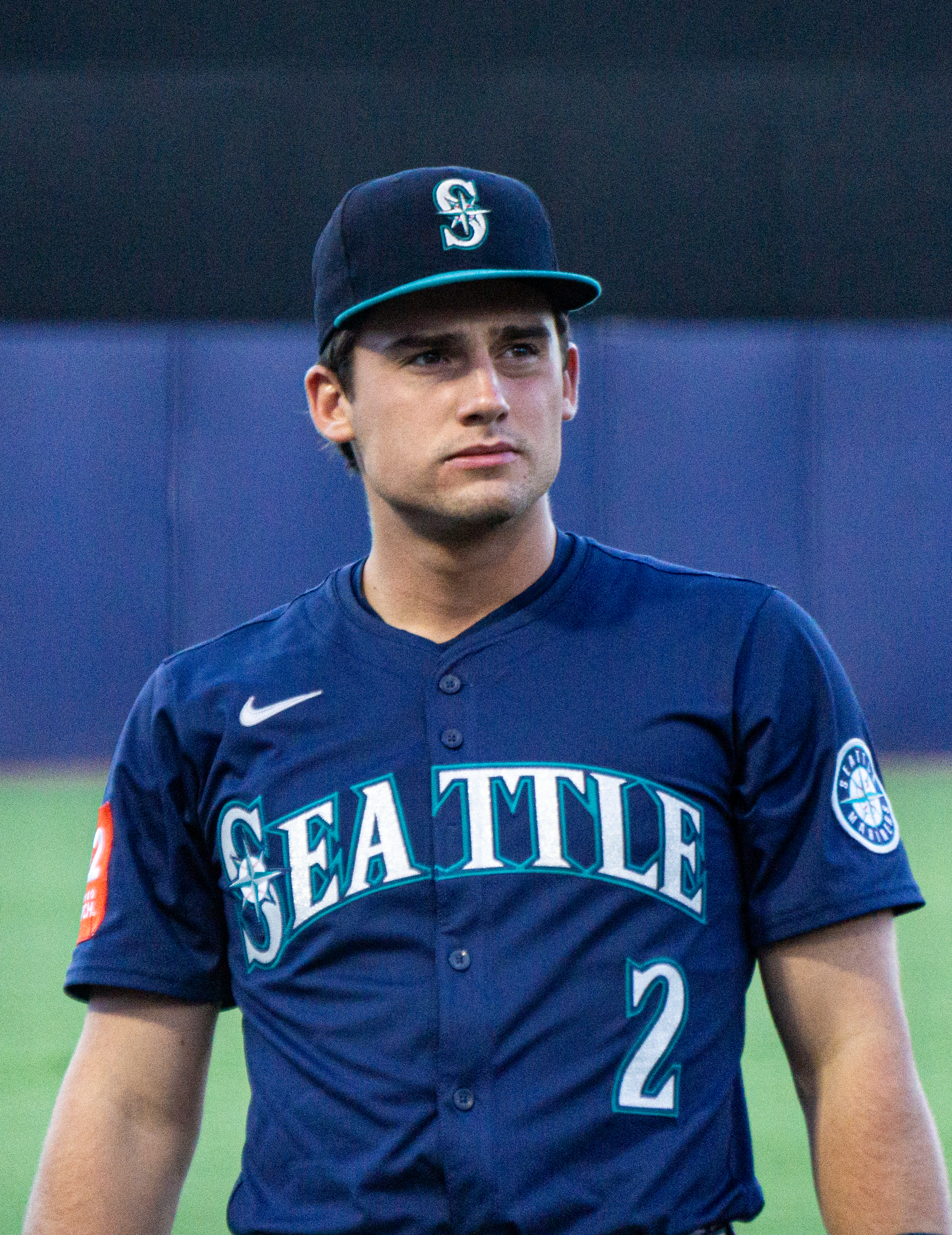
Cole Young made his MLB debut with the Mariners in May

However, the team ended the month in a slump, losing three out of four games in Houston to the Astros and three out of five games at home. On May 30, Andrés Muñoz blew his third save of the month as the team fell behind Houston in the AL West. On May 31, Cole Young had a walk-off in his MLB debut, a fielder's choice in a 5–4, 11-inning win over the Minnesota Twins. Earlier in that game, Cal Raleigh hit his 22nd home run, tied for the MLB lead with Shohei Ohtani.

Raleigh led the team, batting .304 with 12 home runs and 26 RBI in May. J. P. Crawford moved up to the leadoff role, hitting a first-pitch home run on May 4. The team continued to look for an everyday right fielder, promoting Rhylan Thomas for his MLB debut on May 2, then claiming Leody Taveras off waivers from the Texas Rangers. The team's first base platoon of Rowdy Tellez and Donovan Solano also struggled.

On the mound, George Kirby made his first start of the season on May 22, but Bryce Miller briefly went on the injured list, returning on May 31. Brash returned from injury, pitching on May 3 for the first time since the 2023 season. Other bullpen reinforcements included Jackson Kowar, who made his Mariners debut on May 28, Casey Lawrence, who returned to the team after being claimed by Toronto, and Jesse Hahn, who was called up on May 21 when Lawrence was designated for assignment for the fifth time that season. Blas Castaño made his MLB debut, pitching the final three innings of a 9–0 loss to the Washington Nationals on May 28. Despite the blown saves, Muñoz allowed his first earned run on May 30 and led the majors with 17 saves.

==== June ====
A Randy Arozarena walk-off single, following another Andrés Muñoz blown save against the Twins on June 1 put the Mariners back in first in the AL West. However, a 1–8 stretch put the Mariners behind Houston. The Mariners were swept on the road in Baltimore, won one game out of three against the Los Angeles Angels in Anaheim, then were swept by the Arizona Diamondbacks, with Josh Naylor hitting a walk-off grand slam off Carlos Vargas on June 9 and Eugenio Suárez hitting a grand slam on June 11. The Mariners then swept the Cleveland Guardians at home, with Jorge Polanco hitting a walk-off single off closer Emmanuel Clase on June 14. The next day, Crawford hit a home run on Father's Day. The Boston Red Sox then won two of three in Seattle, with the lone win coming as Cal Raleigh hit a grand slam and Bryan Woo threw 7 shutout innings on June 17.

The Mariners started their road trip strong, winning two games against the Chicago Cubs. In the rubber match on June 22, Donovan Solano and Dominic Canzone both hit two home runs. Seattle won its first two games in Minnesota, clubbing four home runs on June 23, before losing the final two games of the series to the Twins. Returning home, the Mariners won two 12-inning games against the Texas Rangers and beat the Kansas City Royals on June 30. In that game, Raleigh hit his 33rd home run, tied for third most by any player at the end of June. Arozarena also hit his 100th major league home run.

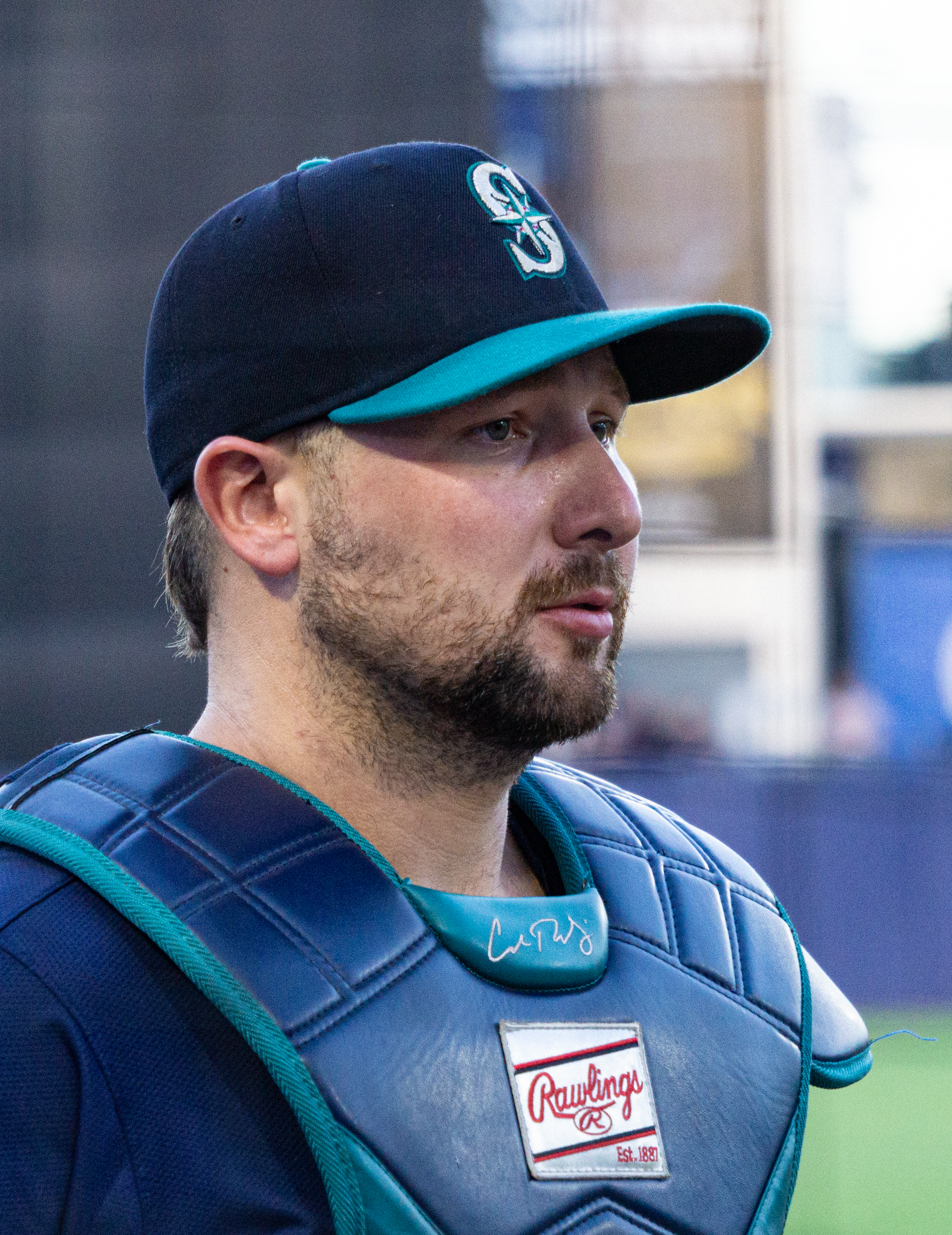
Cal Raleigh was the AL Player of the Month in June

Raleigh was named the AL Player of the Month for June. He hit .300 and led the AL with 11 home runs and had a .690 slugging percentage and 3 stolen bases. He also committed to participate in the Home Run Derby in July. He was also named the AL Player of the Week on June 1 and June 22.

After two starts, Bryce Miller returned to the injured list on June 10 and was replaced by spot starter Logan Evans. Logan Gilbert made his return to the rotation on June 16 but topped out at 5 1/3 innings in his three June starts. Woo remained the team's most dependable starter, reaching 16 consecutive starts in which he pitched at least 6 innings on June 28. George Kirby tossed a career-high 14 strikeouts in a win on June 8.

The Mariners began making changes to their lineup. Infield prospects Cole Young and Ben Williamson, both called up during the season, started regularly at second base and third base, respectively. Right fielder Dominic Canzone hit a 450-foot home run in his first game after being called up on June 10, replacing Leody Taveras, who was designated for assignment (DFA). The team DFA'd Rowdy Tellez on June 20 as Luke Raley returned from injury. Donovan Solano, the right-handed half of the first base platoon, had his strongest month of the season, batting .385/.429/.577 in 17 games.

==== July ====
On July 2, Cal Raleigh was named the starting catcher in the All-Star Game. On July 6, Andrés Muñoz, Julio Rodríguez, and Bryan Woo were selected to the AL team, with Randy Arozarena later replacing Rodríguez. Raleigh won the Home Run Derby, the second Mariner to win the contest, following three-time winner Ken Griffey Jr. In the All-Star Game, Raleigh was 1-for-2, Arozarena 0-for-3, Woo pitched a scoreless third inning, and Muñoz got two outs in the 8th inning.

Prior to the All-Star Break, the Mariners lost two of the final three games at home to the Kansas City Royals, demoting Emerson Hancock after a poor start. Seattle then swept the Pittsburgh Pirates with three straight shutouts. Arozarena clinched the sweep by homering off Carmen Mlodzinski, pitching in relief of ace Paul Skenes, for a 1–0 victory on July 7. It was the franchise's first three-game sweep in which they did not allow a run. The team followed it up with two more sweeps, first getting swept by the New York Yankees at Yankee Stadium, wasting Woo taking a no-hitter into the 8th inning on July 10. The Yankees won in a walk off after Muñoz blew a save after tipping pitches to New York. The Mariners rebounded, sweeping the AL Central-leading Detroit Tigers, including besting reigning Cy Young Award winner Tarik Skubal on July 11. The final score was 12–3, with Raleigh hitting two home runs, including a grand slam late in the game.

After the All-Star Break, the Mariners faced another division leader, the Houston Astros, at home. Seattle won the first two games of the series, with Cole Young hitting a walk-off single in the 11th inning on July 19 to pull Seattle within three games of the division lead. Facing a third consecutive division leader, the Mariners lost two out of three games to the Milwaukee Brewers, with a Raleigh home run and scoreless performance by Logan Gilbert and the bullpen snapping Milwaukee's 11-game win streak with a 1–0 win on July 22.

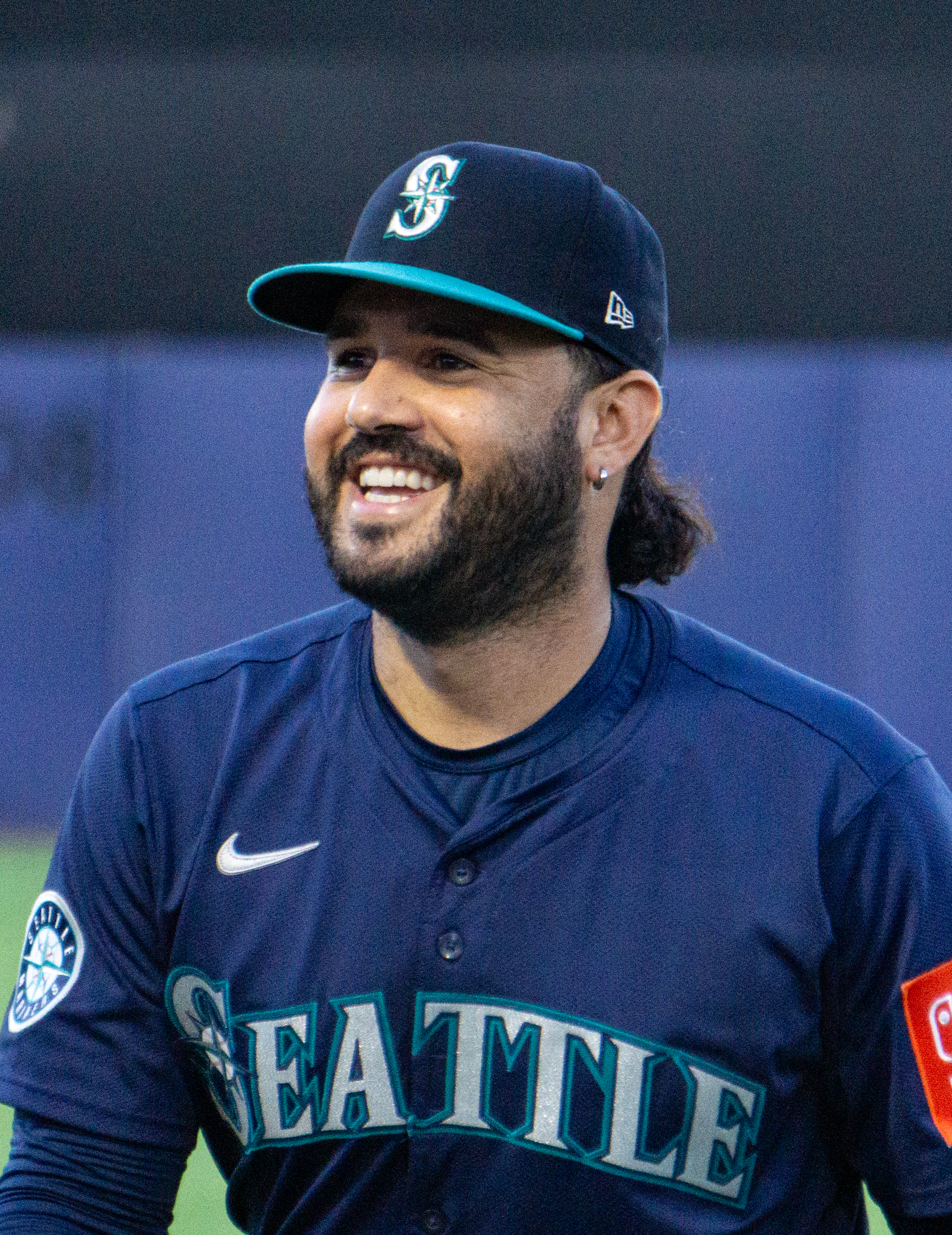
Eugenio Suárez returned to the Mariners in July 2025

The Mariners then embarked on a poor intra-division road trip, splitting a four game series with the Los Angeles Angels in Anaheim and losing two out of three games to the Athletics in West Sacramento. Arozarena stole his 20th stolen base on July 29, completing his fifth consecutive 20–20 season. During this stretch, the team made two notable trades with the Arizona Diamondbacks, acquiring Josh Naylor on July 25 and Eugenio Suárez on July 30. Arizona received pitchers Brandyn Garcia and Ashton Izzi for Naylor and first baseman Tyler Locklear and pitchers Juan Burgos and Hunter Cranton for Suárez. Ahead of the trade deadline, the team also acquired left-handed reliever Caleb Ferguson from the Pirates for pitcher Jeter Martinez on July 30. The Mariners did not trade away any of their top prospects. President of baseball operations Jerry Dipoto said the team sought to add even more relief pitchers. The Mariners won Suárez's first game back in Seattle, a 6–0 win over the Texas Rangers. In that game, Raleigh hit his league-leading 42nd home run. He hit the most home runs in a season by a switch-hitting catcher, surpassing Todd Hundley in 1996.

==== August ====
J. P. Crawford hit a walk-off two-run home run on August 1. After a loss to the Texas Rangers, the Mariners won 8 in a row, sweeping the Chicago White Sox and Tampa Bay Rays at home. Cal Raleigh hit a go-ahead three-run home run against the Rays on August 8, then hit his 45th home run on August 10. During the Rays sweep, the Mariners retired Ichiro Suzuki's number 51. After one win in Baltimore that moved the Mariners into a tie with the Houston Astros in the AL West, Matt Brash allowed a walk-off double to Jackson Holliday on August 13, the Orioles' first walk-off win of the season. That loss started a prolonged swoon, as the Mariners went 6–15 through September 5. Seattle won its first game against the New York Mets before losing in Nolan McLean's MLB debt and in the MLB Little League Classic in Williamsport, Pennsylvania. The Philadelphia Phillies then swept the Mariners, who allowed 29 runs in three games to end a poor road trip.

The Mariners rebounded at home, winning consecutive series against the Athletics and San Diego Padres. All-Stars Bryan Woo earned his 11th win and Andrés Muñoz earned his 30th save on August 22. Raleigh hit a 448-foot home run on August 24, his longest home run of the season and his 49th of the season, surpassing Salvador Perez for most by a catcher. The Mariners won the Vedder Cup the following night, as Raleigh hit his 50th home run in a win over the Padres. The Mariners ended the month losing two out of three on the road to the Cleveland Guardians. Muñoz blew his 7th save in a 5–4 walk-off loss on August 29.

Julio Rodríguez powered the Mariners in August, continuing his trend of strong second-half hitting. He reached his fourth consecutive 20 home run, 20 stolen base club on August 4. He hit .321 with 7 home runs and 22 RBI in August. Raleigh led the team with 8 home runs and set a new record for most home runs by a catcher but batted .179, with only 9 non-home run hits. In his first month with the Mariners, Josh Naylor paced the team with 11 stolen bases despite being one of the slowest runners in the sport. The Mariners waived Dylan Moore on August 24, following a prolonged slump, as Víctor Robles returned from the injured list.

Woo reached 12 wins to lead the team, but his streak of starts with at least six innings and no more than two walks ended on August 25. Bryce Miller returned from the injured list on August 19 and won his final two starts of the month. Left-handed reliever Gabe Speier allowed only one run in 15 appearances. Emerson Hancock, who was inconsistent as a starter, returned to the Mariners on August 27 as a reliever.

==== September ====
As rosters expanded on September 1, the Mariners promoted top prospect Harry Ford as well as infielder Leo Rivas and reliever Luke Jackson, jettisoning infielder Donovan Solano and reliever Sauryn Lao. The moves did not pay off immediately, as the Tampa Bay Rays swept the Mariners in Tampa. The Mariners lost their first game in Atlanta, lowering their record to 73–68, their lowest winning percentage since July 10.

The Mariners then went on an extended hot streak that led to their division title. Seattle blew out the Atlanta Braves twice, powered by two home runs by Julio Rodríguez on September 6. The Mariners then swept the St. Louis Cardinals at home, with Rivas hitting a walk-off 11th inning home run to clinch the sweep on September 10. The team then swept the Los Angeles Angels for the franchise's first 7–0 homestand. Three pitchers set or matched personal strikeout records against the Angels: Bryce Miller struck out 11 batters on September 11, Bryan Woo struck out 13 batters on September 13, and George Kirby matched a career-high 14 strikeouts the next night. The Mariners began a road trip against the Kansas City Royals, with Cal Raleigh hitting his 55th home run, passing Mickey Mantle for most by a switch hitter in a season, on September 16. The next night, the Mariners lost after a poor Matt Brash relief effort, ending their winning streak at 10 games. The team employed two superstitions during the winning stretch, with players growing mustaches and fans embracing a spell by an "Etsy witch".

The Mariners traveled to Houston tied with the Astros for the AL West division lead. The Mariners won all three games, with starters Woo (who left after 5 innings with a pectoral injury), Kirby, and Logan Gilbert allowing 1 run in 17 innings. Raleigh hit his franchise single season record 57th home run on September 20, then homered the next day to close out the series.

Returning home, the Mariners clinched a playoff spot, their first since 2022, by beating the Colorado Rockies on September 23. The next night, the Mariners defeated the Rockies 9–2 to clinch their first AL West title since the 2001 season. Raleigh hit two home runs, becoming the fourth AL player ever to hit 60 home runs in a season. On September 25, the Mariners completed a sweep of the lowly Rockies, securing a bye to the American League Division Series due to a loss by the Cleveland Guardians. After securing their postseason position, the Mariners were swept by the Los Angeles Dodgers to end the regular season. Clayton Kershaw, in his final regular season start, held Seattle scoreless in 5 1/3 innings on September 28 for his 223rd career win.

Raleigh's 60 home runs set new single-season records for a catcher, a switch hitter, and the Mariners. Seattle finished third in the majors in home runs, and Raleigh, Julio Rodríguez, Randy Arozarena, and Jorge Polanco each hit at least 25 home runs, the most for the team since 1997. After joining the Mariners in July, Eugenio Suárez finished the season with 49 home runs, tying his personal best. Naylor stole his 30th base on September 26th, making him the fourth major league first baseman with a 20 home run, 30 stolen base season. Rodríguez stole two bases on September 27, joining the 30–30 club for the second time. Arozarena, after joining the 20–20 club in July, finished with 27 home runs and 31 steals, stealing a base in three consecutive games on the final homestand.

Woo led Mariners starters with 15 wins, a 2.94 ERA and 198 strikeouts, though his regular season ended on September 19 with a pectoral injury. Luis Castillo led the team with 32 starts and finished strong, with 1.07 ERA in his final four starts. Andrés Muñoz saved 38 games, nearly matching the 40 saves in his first 5 MLB seasons. Gabe Speier was second among AL relievers with 76 appearances and a 29.2% strikeout minus walk rate.

=== Game log ===
Legend
	Mariners win
	Mariners loss
	Clinched playoff spot
	Clinched division
**Bold**	Mariners team member

2025 Game Log: 90–72 (Home: 51–29, Road: 39–43)
March/April: 18–12 (Home: 12–6, Road: 6–6)

#	Date	Opponent	Score	Win	Loss	Save	Attendance	Record	Streak
1	March 27	Athletics	4–2	**Thornton** (1–0)	Leclerc (0–1)	**Muñoz** (1)	42,871	1–0	W1
2	March 28	Athletics	0–7	Springs (1–0)	**L. Castillo** (0–1)	—	25,061	1–1	L1
3	March 29	Athletics	2–4	Bido (1–0)	**Miller** (0–1)	Miller (1)	35,264	1–2	L2
4	March 30	Athletics	2–1	**Woo** (1–0)	Sears (0–1)	**Muñoz** (2)	27,696	2–2	W1
5	March 31	Tigers	6–9	Holton (1–0)	**Hancock** (0–1)	Hurter (1)	15,306	2–3	L1
6	April 1	Tigers	1–4	Mize (1–0)	**Gilbert** (0–1)	Kahnle (1)	17,333	2–4	L2
7	April 2	Tigers	3–2	**L. Castillo** (1–1)	Skubal (0–2)	**Muñoz** (3)	15,560	3–4	W1
8	April 4	@ Giants	9–10 (11)	Bivens (1–1)	**Vargas** (0–1)	—	40,865	3–5	L1
9	April 5	@ Giants	1–4	Ray (2–0)	**Miller** (0–2)	Walker (3)	40,886	3–6	L2
10	April 6	@ Giants	4–5	Doval (1–0)	**Santos** (0–1)	—	41,060	3–7	L3
11	April 7	Astros	4–3	**Santos** (1–1)	Scott (0–1)	**Muñoz** (4)	19,383	4–7	W1
12	April 8	Astros	1–2 (12)	Gusto (1–0)	**Hahn** (0–1)	Okert (1)	22,409	4–8	L1
13	April 9	Astros	7–6	**Lawrence** (1–0)	Abreu (0–1)	—	20,556	5–8	W1
14	April 11	Rangers	5–3	**Vargas** (1–1)	Martin (0–2)	**Muñoz** (5)	28,366	6–8	W2
15	April 12	Rangers	9–2	**Woo** (2–0)	Rocker (0–2)	—	29,943	7–8	W3
16	April 13	Rangers	3–1	**Gilbert** (1–1)	Eovaldi (1–2)	**Muñoz** (6)	25,100	8–8	W4
17	April 15	@ Reds	4–8	Barlow (1–0)	**L. Castillo** (1–2)	—	17,205	8–9	L1
18	April 16	@ Reds	5–3	**Miller** (1–2)	Martinez (0–3)	**Muñoz** (7)	11,817	9–9	W1
19	April 17	@ Reds	11–7 (10)	**Legumina** (1–0)	Ashcraft (0–1)	—	18,032	10–9	W2
20	April 18	@ Blue Jays	1–3	Francis (2–2)	**Woo** (2–1)	Hoffman (5)	40,263	10–10	L1
21	April 19	@ Blue Jays	8–4 (12)	**Muñoz** (1–0)	Barnes (0–1)	—	36,775	11–10	W1
22	April 20	@ Blue Jays	8–3	**L. Castillo** (2–2)	Lucas (2–2)	—	25,752	12–10	W2
23	April 22	@ Red Sox	3–8	Bello (1–0)	**Miller** (1–3)	—	33,027	12–11	L1
24	April 23	@ Red Sox	8–5	**Hancock** (1–1)	Newcomb (0–3)	**Muñoz** (8)	31,904	13–11	W1
25	April 24	@ Red Sox	4–3	**Woo** (3–1)	Crochet (2–2)	**Muñoz** (9)	35,655	14–11	W2
26	April 25	Marlins	4–8	Quantrill (2–2)	**Lawrence** (1–1)	—	29,753	14–12	L1
27	April 26	Marlins	14–0	**L. Castillo** (3–2)	Gillispie (0–3)	—	35,362	15–12	W1
28	April 27	Marlins	7–6	**Evans** (1–0)	Meyer (2–3)	**Muñoz** (10)	30,361	16–12	W2
29	April 29	Angels	5–3	**Miller** (2–3)	Kochanowicz (1–4)	**Muñoz** (11)	18,247	17–12	W3
30	April 30	Angels	9–3	**Legumina** (2–0)	Detmers (0–1)	—	16,229	18–12	W4

May: 13–14 (Home: 3–8; Road: 10–6)

#	Date	Opponent	Score	Win	Loss	Save	Attendance	Record	Streak
31	May 2	@ Rangers	13–1	**Woo** (4–1)	Leiter (2–1)	—	29,074	19–12	W5
32	May 3	@ Rangers	2–1	**Speier** (1–0)	Martin (0–4)	**Muñoz** (12)	26,726	20–12	W6
33	May 4	@ Rangers	1–8	deGrom (2–1)	**Evans** (1–1)	—	27,812	20–13	L1
34	May 5	@ Athletics	6–7 (11)	Harris (1–0)	**Legumina** (2–1)	—	10,257	20–14	L2
35	May 6	@ Athletics	5–3	**Snider** (1–0)	Ferguson (0–1)	**Vargas** (1)	9,615	21–14	W1
36	May 7	@ Athletics	6–5	**Bazardo** (1–0)	Murdock (0–1)	**Muñoz** (13)	9,697	22–14	W2
37	May 9	Blue Jays	3–6	Gausman (3–3)	**L. Castillo** (3–3)	Hoffman (8)	31,564	22–15	L1
38	May 10	Blue Jays	3–6	Fluharty (3–0)	**Vargas** (1–2)	Hoffman (9)	31,182	22–16	L2
39	May 11	Blue Jays	1–9	Lauer (1–0)	**Miller** (2–4)	—	36,823	22–17	L3
40	May 12	Yankees	5–11	Schmidt (1–1)	**Hancock** (1–2)	—	27,895	22–18	L4
41	May 13	Yankees	2–1 (11)	**Legumina** (3–1)	Hill (3–1)	—	38,840	23–18	W1
42	May 14	Yankees	2–3	Hamilton (1–0)	**Vargas** (1–3)	Weaver (4)	30,520	23–19	L1
43	May 16	@ Padres	5–1	**Evans** (2–1)	Kolek (2–1)	—	41,336	24–19	W1
44	May 17	@ Padres	4–1	**Speier** (2–0)	Morejón (1–2)	**Muñoz** (14)	42,240	25–19	W2
45	May 18	@ Padres	6–1	**Woo** (5–1)	King (4–2)	—	43,320	26–19	W3
46	May 19	@ White Sox	5–1	**L. Castillo** (4–3)	Martin (2–5)	**Muñoz** (15)	10,380	27–19	W4
47	May 20	@ White Sox	0–1	Houser (1–0)	**Lawrence** (1–2)	Leasure (1)	11,983	27–20	L1
48	May 21	@ White Sox	6–5	**Legumina** (4–1)	Vasil (2–2)	**Muñoz** (16)	10,556	28–20	W1
49	May 22	@ Astros	2–9	Dubin (1–0)	**Kirby** (0–1)	—	29,512	28–21	L1
50	May 23	@ Astros	5–3	**Hancock** (2–2)	Abreu (1–1)	**Muñoz** (17)	34,664	29–21	W1
51	May 24	@ Astros	1–2	Valdez (4–4)	**Woo** (5–2)	Hader (13)	35,785	29–22	L1
52	May 25	@ Astros	3–5	King (3–0)	**Legumina** (4–2)	—	35,526	29–23	L2
53	May 27	Nationals	9–1	**Evans** (3–1)	Parker (4–4)	—	19,861	30–23	W1
54	May 28	Nationals	0–9	Williams (3–5)	**Kirby** (0–2)	—	19,475	30–24	L1
55	May 29	Nationals	3–9 (10)	Ferrer (2–2)	**Snider** (1–1)	—	19,599	30–25	L2
56	May 30	Twins	6–12 (10)	Durán (4–1)	**Legumina** (4–3)	—	39,614	30–26	L3
57	May 31	Twins	5–4 (11)	**Snider** (2–1)	Sands (3–2)	—	37,457	31–26	W1

June: 13–14 (Home: 6–5; Road: 7–9)

#	Date	Opponent	Score	Win	Loss	Save	Attendance	Record	Streak
58	June 1	Twins	2–1	**Muñoz** (2–0)	Jax (1–3)	—	39,003	32–26	W2
59	June 3	Orioles	1–5	Sugano (5–3)	**Kirby** (0–3)	—	21,089	32–27	L1
60	June 4	Orioles	2–3	Canó (1–4)	**Vargas** (1–4)	Bautista (11)	19,231	32–28	L2
61	June 5	Orioles	3–4	Eflin (5–2)	**Woo** (5–3)	Baker (2)	27,887	32–29	L3
62	June 6	@ Angels	4–5	Hendricks (3–6)	**Miller** (2–5)	Jansen (13)	35,915	32–30	L4
63	June 7	@ Angels	6–8	Brogdon (1–0)	**L. Castillo** (4–4)	Jansen (14)	29,407	32–31	L5
64	June 8	@ Angels	3–2	**Kirby** (1–3)	Anderson (2–3)	**Muñoz** (18)	31,416	33–31	W1
65	June 9	@ Diamondbacks	4–8 (11)	Beeks (2–0)	**Vargas** (1–5)	—	22,799	33–32	L1
66	June 10	@ Diamondbacks	3–10	Pfaadt (8–4)	**Evans** (3–2)	Jarvis (1)	25,140	33–33	L2
67	June 11	@ Diamondbacks	2–5	Rodríguez (2–3)	**Woo** (5–4)	Miller (7)	25,969	33–34	L3
68	June 13	Guardians	7–2	**Vargas** (2–5)	Herrin (4–2)	—	34,378	34–34	W1
69	June 14	Guardians	4–3	**Kowar** (1–0)	Clase (4–1)	—	32,211	35–34	W2
70	June 15	Guardians	6–0	**Hancock** (3–2)	Ortiz (3–8)	—	40,871	36–34	W3
71	June 16	Red Sox	0–2	Giolito (3–1)	**Gilbert** (1–2)	Chapman (13)	24,490	36–35	L1
72	June 17	Red Sox	8–0	**Woo** (6–4)	Buehler (5–5)	—	26,974	37–35	W1
73	June 18	Red Sox	1–3	Crochet (7–4)	**L. Castillo** (4–5)	Weissert (3)	32,200	37–36	L1
74	June 20	@ Cubs	9–4	**Bazardo** (2–0)	Thielbar (2–2)	—	40,787	38–36	W1
75	June 21	@ Cubs	7–10	Keller (3–0)	**Hancock** (3–3)	—	39,047	38–37	L1
76	June 22	@ Cubs	14–6	**Gilbert** (2–2)	Rea (4–3)	—	36,185	39–37	W1
77	June 23	@ Twins	11–2	**Woo** (7–4)	Ober (4–5)	—	17,909	40–37	W2
78	June 24	@ Twins	6–5	**Muñoz** (3–0)	Durán (4–3)	**Brash** (1)	23,532	41–37	W3
79	June 25	@ Twins	0–2	Ryan (8–3)	**Kirby** (1–4)	Durán (11)	15,850	41–38	L1
80	June 26	@ Twins	1–10	Woods Richardson (3–4)	**Hancock** (3–4)	—	19,666	41–39	L2
81	June 27	@ Rangers	7–6 (12)	**Bazardo** (3–0)	Armstrong (2–3)	—	30,228	42–39	W1
82	June 28	@ Rangers	2–3 (10)	Armstrong (3–3)	**Muñoz** (3–1)	—	35,506	42–40	L1
83	June 29	@ Rangers	6–4 (12)	**Thornton** (2–0)	Winn (0–1)	—	31,126	43–40	W1
84	June 30	Royals	6–2	**Kirby** (2–4)	Wacha (4–8)	—	27,309	44–40	W2

July: 14–12 (Home: 8–5; Road: 6–7)

#	Date	Opponent	Score	Win	Loss	Save	Attendance	Record	Streak
85	July 1	Royals	3–6	Erceg (3–2)	**Hancock** (3–5)	Estévez (23)	22,351	44–41	L1
86	July 2	Royals	3–2	**Vargas** (3–5)	Zerpa (3–1)	**Muñoz** (19)	24,752	45–41	W1
87	July 3	Royals	2–3	Lugo (6–5)	**Legumina** (4–4)	Estévez (24)	38,030	45–42	L1
88	July 4	Pirates	6–0	**Woo** (8–4)	Falter (6–4)	—	33,061	46–42	W1
89	July 5	Pirates	1–0	**L. Castillo** (5–5)	Ferguson (2–1)	**Muñoz** (20)	32,295	47–42	W2
90	July 6	Pirates	1–0	**Kirby** (3–4)	Mlodzinski (2–6)	**Muñoz** (21)	35,174	48–42	W3
91	July 8	@ Yankees	3–10	Warren (6–4)	**Gilbert** (2–3)	—	38,641	48–43	L1
92	July 9	@ Yankees	6–9	Schlittler (1–0)	**Evans** (3–3)	Williams (13)	35,651	48–44	L2
93	July 10	@ Yankees	5–6 (10)	Williams (3–3)	**Speier** (2–1)	—	41,241	48–45	L3
94	July 11	@ Tigers	12–3	**L. Castillo** (6–5)	Skubal (10–3)	—	41,681	49–45	W1
95	July 12	@ Tigers	15–7	**Kirby** (4–4)	Mize (9–3)	—	36,438	50–45	W2
96	July 13	@ Tigers	8–4	**Brash** (1–0)	Kahnle (1–2)	—	34,671	51–45	W3
**95th All-Star Game in Cumberland, GA**
97	July 18	Astros	6–1	**L. Castillo** (7–5)	Walter (1–3)	—	41,834	52–45	W4
98	July 19	Astros	7–6 (11)	**Bazardo** (4–0)	Neris (3–2)	—	31,700	53–45	W5
99	July 20	Astros	3–11	Ort (2–1)	**Woo** (8–5)	—	33,189	53–46	L1
100	July 21	Brewers	0–6	Woodruff (2–0)	**Kirby** (4–5)	—	30,085	53–47	L2
101	July 22	Brewers	1–0	**Gilbert** (3–3)	Mears (1–3)	**Muñoz** (22)	32,189	54–47	W1
102	July 23	Brewers	2–10	Priester (9–2)	**L. Castillo** (7–6)	—	41,449	54–48	L1
103	July 24	@ Angels	4–2	**Evans** (4–3)	Kikuchi (4–7)	**Muñoz** (23)	28,532	55–48	W1
104	July 25	@ Angels	2–3 (10)	Zeferjahn (6–3)	**Legumina** (4–5)	—	37,821	55–49	L1
105	July 26	@ Angels	7–2	**Kirby** (5–5)	Fermín (2–2)	—	40,836	56–49	W1
106	July 27	@ Angels	1–4	Hendricks (6–7)	**Gilbert** (3–4)	Jansen (18)	27,219	56–50	L1
107	July 28	@ Athletics	3–1	**L. Castillo** (8–6)	Sears (7–9)	**Muñoz** (24)	9,536	57–50	W1
108	July 29	@ Athletics	1–6	Severino (5–11)	**Evans** (4–4)	—	8,671	57–51	L1
109	July 30	@ Athletics	4–5	Springs (10–7)	**Woo** (8–6)	Perkins (3)	9,165	57–52	L2
110	July 31	Rangers	6–0	**Kirby** (6–5)	Rocker (4–5)	—	28,293	58–52	W1

August: 15–12 (Home: 12–3; Road: 3–9)

#	Date	Opponent	Score	Win	Loss	Save	Attendance	Record	Streak
111	August 1	Rangers	4–3	**Bazardo** (5–0)	Garcia (1–6)	—	40,984	59–52	W2
112	August 2	Rangers	4–6 (11)	Curvelo (1–0)	**Legumina** (4–6)	—	37,266	59–53	L1
113	August 3	Rangers	5–4	**Evans** (5–4)	deGrom (10–4)	**Muñoz** (25)	29,510	60–53	W1
114	August 5	White Sox	8–3	**Woo** (9–6)	Martin (3–9)	—	30,686	61–53	W2
115	August 6	White Sox	8–6	**Kirby** (7–5)	Cannon (4–9)	**Muñoz** (26)	32,756	62–53	W3
116	August 7	White Sox	4–3 (11)	**Kowar** (2–0)	Eisert (2–3)	—	37,930	63–53	W4
117	August 8	Rays	3–2	**Vargas** (4–5)	Jax (1–6)	**Brash** (2)	39,780	64–53	W5
118	August 9	Rays	7–4	**Evans** (6–4)	Boyle (1–2)	**Muñoz** (27)	42,249	65–53	W6
119	August 10	Rays	6–3	**Woo** (10–6)	Houser (6–4)	**Brash** (3)	37,434	66–53	W7
120	August 12	@ Orioles	1–0	**Kirby** (8–5)	Kremer (8–9)	**Muñoz** (28)	19,356	67–53	W8
121	August 13	@ Orioles	3–4	Akin (4–2)	**Brash** (1–1)	—	17,290	67–54	L1
122	August 14	@ Orioles	3–5	Sugano (10–5)	**Evans** (6–5)	Enns (1)	14,083	67–55	L2
123	August 15	@ Mets	11–9	**Ferguson** (3–2)	Helsley (3–4)	**Muñoz** (29)	41,200	68–55	W1
124	August 16	@ Mets	1–3	McLean (1–0)	**Woo** (10–7)	Díaz (24)	42,978	68–56	L1
125	August 17	@ Mets (Note: Played at Bowman Field in Williamsport, Pennsylvania)	3–7	Holmes (10–6)	**Kirby** (8–6)	—	2,518	68–57	L2
126	August 18	@ Phillies	7–12	Suárez (9–6)	**Gilbert** (3–5)	—	44,471	68–58	L3
127	August 19	@ Phillies	4–6	Robertson (1–0)	**Brash** (1–2)	Durán (22)	43,757	68–59	L4
128	August 20	@ Phillies	2–11	Luzardo (12–6)	**L. Castillo** (8–7)	—	38,331	68–60	L5
129	August 22	Athletics	3–2	**Woo** (11–7)	Alvarado (1–1)	**Muñoz** (30)	36,958	69–60	W1
130	August 23	Athletics	1–2 (10)	Ferguson (3–2)	**Ferguson** (3–3)	Harris (2)	36,524	69–61	L1
131	August 24	Athletics	11–4	**Gilbert** (4–5)	Lopez (7–7)	—	37,550	70–61	W1
132	August 25	Padres	9–6	**Miller** (3–5)	Morgan (1–2)	—	27,785	71–61	W2
133	August 26	Padres	6–7	Morejón (10–4)	**Ferguson** (3–4)	Suárez (35)	35,910	71–62	L1
134	August 27	Padres	4–3	**Woo** (12–7)	Darvish (3–4)	**Muñoz** (31)	37,600	72–62	W1
135	August 29	@ Guardians	4–5	Herrin (5–3)	**Muñoz** (3–2)	—	32,012	72–63	L1
136	August 30	@ Guardians	3–4	Williams (9–5)	**Gilbert** (4–6)	Smith (9)	33,203	72–64	L2
137	August 31	@ Guardians	4–2	**Miller** (4–5)	Bibee (9–11)	**Muñoz** (32)	34,136	73–64	W1

September: 17–8 (Home: 10–3; Road: 7–5)

#	Date	Opponent	Score	Win	Loss	Save	Attendance	Record	Streak
138	September 1	@ Rays	2–10	Baz (9–11)	**L. Castillo** (8–8)	—	10,046	73–65	L1
139	September 2	@ Rays	5–6	Kelly (1–3)	**Speier** (2–2)	Cleavinger (2)	7,883	73–66	L2
140	September 3	@ Rays	4–9	Houser (8–4)	**Kirby** (8–7)	—	8,589	73–67	L3
141	September 5	@ Braves	1–4	Kinley (5–3)	**Speier** (2–3)	Iglesias (24)	36,203	73–68	L4
142	September 6	@ Braves	10–2	**Speier** (3–3)	Hernández (4–3)	—	35,700	74–68	W1
143	September 7	@ Braves	18–2	**L. Castillo** (9–8)	Wentz (5–6)	—	31,119	75–68	W2
144	September 8	Cardinals	4–2	**Woo** (13–7)	Graceffo (3–1)	**Muñoz** (33)	22,899	76–68	W3
145	September 9	Cardinals	5–3	**Ferguson** (4–4)	Liberatore (7–12)	**Muñoz** (34)	23,044	77–68	W4
146	September 10	Cardinals	4–2 (13)	**Hancock** (4–5)	Fernandez (0–3)	—	25,495	78–68	W5
147	September 11	Angels	7–6 (12)	**J. Castillo** (2–2)	Peralta (0–1)	—	19,129	79–68	W6
148	September 12	Angels	2–1	**Vargas** (5–5)	Brogdon (3–2)	**Muñoz** (35)	36,143	80–68	W7
149	September 13	Angels	5–3	**Woo** (14–7)	Farris (1–1)	**Brash** (4)	38,962	81–68	W8
150	September 14	Angels	11–2	**Kirby** (9–7)	Hendricks (7–10)	—	42,513	82–68	W9
151	September 16	@ Royals	12–5	**Gilbert** (5–6)	Wacha (9–12)	—	20,017	83–68	W10
152	September 17	@ Royals	5–7	Erceg (8–4)	**Brash** (1–3)	Estévez (40)	19,127	83–69	L1
153	September 18	@ Royals	2–0	**L. Castillo** (10–8)	Kolek (5–6)	**Muñoz** (36)	18,137	84–69	W1
154	September 19	@ Astros	4–0	**Woo** (15–7)	Brown (12–8)	—	41,471	85–69	W2
155	September 20	@ Astros	6–4	**Kirby** (10–7)	Valdez (12–11)	**Muñoz** (37)	42,065	86–69	W3
156	September 21	@ Astros	7–3	**Gilbert** (6–6)	Alexander (4–2)	—	41,893	87–69	W4
157	September 23	Rockies	4–3	**Speier** (4–3)	Mejía (2–2)	**Muñoz** (38)	35,925	88–69	W5
158	September 24	Rockies	9–2	**L. Castillo** (11–8)	Gordon (6–8)	—	42,883	89–69	W6
159	September 25	Rockies	6–2	**Ferguson** (5–4)	Blalock (2–6)	—	40,686	90–69	W7
160	September 26	Dodgers	2–3	Wrobleski (5–5)	**Kirby** (10–8)	Scott (23)	45,458	90–70	L1
161	September 27	Dodgers	3–5	Vesia (4–2)	**Muñoz** (3–3)	Henriquez (1)	45,701	90–71	L2
162	September 28	Dodgers	1–6	Kershaw (11–2)	**Miller** (4–6)	—	45,658	90–72	L3

== 2025 roster ==
2025 Seattle Mariners
**Roster**
**Pitchers**: 83 Eduard Bazardo; 47 Matt Brash; 67 Juan Burgos; 62 Blas Castaño; 67 José Castillo; 43 Luis F. Castillo; 58 Luis M. Castillo; 74 Jhonathan Díaz; 73 Logan Evans; 43 Caleb Ferguson; 43 Brandyn Garcia; 36 Logan Gilbert; 49 Jesse Hahn; 26 Emerson Hancock; 77 Luke Jackson; 68 George Kirby; 37 Jackson Kowar; 78 Sauryn Lao; 41 Casey Lawrence; 64 Casey Legumina; 50 Bryce Miller; 75 Andrés Muñoz; 35 Zach Pop; 48 Gregory Santos; 60 Tayler Saucedo; 52 Collin Snider; 55 Gabe Speier; 59 Troy Taylor; 46 Trent Thornton; 54 Carlos Vargas; 22 Bryan Woo	**Catchers**: 5 Harry Ford; 18 Mitch Garver; 29 Cal Raleigh; **Infielders**: 1 Ryan Bliss; 3 J. P. Crawford; 25 Dylan Moore; 12 Josh Naylor; 7 Jorge Polanco; 76 Leo Rivas; 39 Donovan Solano; 28 Eugenio Suárez; 23 Rowdy Tellez; 9 Ben Williamson; 2 Cole Young	**Outfielders**: 56 Randy Arozarena; 8 Dominic Canzone; 21 Miles Mastrobuoni; 20 Luke Raley; 10 Víctor Robles; 44 Julio Rodríguez; 4 Leody Taveras; 0 Samad Taylor; 31 Rhylan Thomas	**Manager**: 6 Dan Wilson; **Coaches**: 14 Manny Acta (bench); 57 Tony Arnerich (bullpen); 66 Fleming Baez (bullpen catcher); 40 Trent Blank (director of pitching strategy); 97 Louis Boyd (field coordinator); 80 Danny Farquhar (assistant pitching); 16 Perry Hill (infield); 70 Bobby Magallanes (assistant hitting); 11 Edgar Martínez (director of hitting strategy); 45 Kristopher Negrón (third base); 95 Justin Novak (bullpen catcher); 33 Kevin Seitzer (hitting); 32 Pete Woodworth (pitching); 53 Eric Young Jr. (first base)

=== Player stats ===
Legend
	Team leader
**Bold**	American League leader

==== Batting ====
Note: G = Games played; AB = At bats; R = Runs scored; H = Hits; 2B = Doubles; 3B = Triples; HR = Home runs; RBI = Runs batted in; SB = Stolen bases; BB = Walks; AVG = Batting average; SLG = Slugging average

Player	G	AB	R	H	2B	3B	HR	RBI	SB	BB	AVG	SLG
Julio Rodríguez	160	**652**	106	174	31	4	32	95	30	44	.267	.474
Randy Arozarena	160	613	95	146	32	1	27	76	31	64	.238	.426
Cal Raleigh	159	596	110	147	24	0	**60**	**125**	14	97	.247	.589
J.P. Crawford	157	570	69	151	24	0	12	58	8	74	.265	.370
Jorge Polanco	138	471	64	125	30	0	26	78	6	42	.265	.495
Ben Williamson	85	277	36	70	13	0	1	21	5	15	.253	.310
Mitch Garver	87	254	29	53	5	1	9	30	3	30	.209	.343
Dominic Canzone	82	243	30	73	11	0	11	32	3	20	.300	.481
Cole Young	77	223	24	47	7	1	4	24	1	28	.211	.305
Eugenio Suarez	53	201	27	38	9	0	13	31	3	17	.189	.428
Josh Naylor	54	194	32	58	10	0	9	33	19	11	.299	.490
Dylan Moore	88	192	29	37	5	0	9	19	12	19	.193	.359
Luke Raley	73	183	23	37	8	0	4	19	2	19	.202	.311
Rowdy Tellez	62	173	20	36	6	0	11	27	1	8	.208	.434
Donovan Solano	69	163	10	41	4	1	3	21	0	8	.252	.344
Miles Mastrobuoni	76	152	20	38	4	0	1	12	6	17	.250	.296
Víctor Robles	32	106	12	26	4	1	1	9	6	3	.245	.330
Leody Taveras	28	92	6	16	3	0	2	9	3	3	.174	.272
Leo Rivas	48	90	19	22	2	0	2	9	6	20	.244	.333
Ryan Bliss	11	35	1	7	1	0	1	3	2	4	.200	.314
Samad Taylor	4	8	1	1	0	0	0	0	0	0	.125	.125
Rhylan Thomas	3	8	2	1	1	0	0	2	0	1	.125	.250
Harry Ford	8	6	1	1	0	0	0	1	0	0	.167	.167
**Totals**	**162**	**5502**	**766**	**1345**	**234**	**9**	**238**	**734**	**161**	**544**	**.244**	**.420**

==== Pitching ====
Note: W = Wins; L = Losses; ERA = Earned run average; G = Games pitched; GS = Games started; SV = Saves; IP = Innings pitched; H = Hits allowed; R = Runs allowed; ER = Earned runs allowed; BB = Walks allowed; SO = Strikeouts

Player	W	L	ERA	G	GS	SV	IP	H	R	ER	BB	SO
Bryan Woo	15	7	2.94	30	30	0	186 2/3	137	64	61	36	198
Luis Castillo	11	8	3.54	32	32	0	180 2/3	168	76	71	46	162
Logan Gilbert	6	6	3.44	25	25	0	131	104	53	50	31	173
George Kirby	10	8	4.21	23	23	0	126	121	60	59	29	137
Bryce Miller	4	6	5.68	18	18	0	90	93	57	57	34	74
Emerson Hancock	4	5	4.90	22	16	0	90	93	51	49	31	64
Logan Evans	6	5	4.32	16	15	0	81 1/3	82	45	39	31	59
Eduard Bazardo	5	0	2.52	73	0	0	78 2/3	53	23	22	27	82
Carlos Vargas	5	5	3.97	70	0	1	77	81	39	34	23	54
Andrés Muñoz	3	3	1.73	64	0	38	62 1/3	36	18	12	28	83
Gabe Speier	4	3	2.61	76	0	0	62	43	19	18	11	82
Casey Legumina	4	6	5.62	48	1	0	49 2/3	47	36	31	25	55
Matt Brash	1	3	2.47	53	0	4	47 1/3	41	15	13	18	58
Trent Thornton	2	0	4.68	33	0	0	42 1/3	41	23	22	14	32
Collin Snider	2	1	5.47	24	0	0	26 1/3	32	20	16	6	24
Caleb Ferguson	3	2	3.27	25	0	0	22	21	9	8	8	17
Jackson Kowar	2	0	4.24	15	0	0	17	14	8	8	7	15
Casey Lawrence	1	2	3.00	5	0	0	15	20	12	5	1	6
Tayler Saucedo	0	0	7.43	10	0	0	13 1/3	19	12	11	6	12
Luke Jackson	0	0	2.38	10	0	0	11 1/3	6	6	3	4	10
Gregory Santos	1	1	5.14	8	0	0	7	8	6	4	8	0
Luis F. Castillo	0	0	7.71	2	2	0	7	12	7	6	7	5
Troy Taylor	0	0	12.15	8	0	0	6 2/3	14	9	9	3	2
Juan Burgos	0	0	4.05	4	0	0	6 2/3	7	3	3	2	8
Zach Pop	0	0	13.50	4	0	0	5 1/3	10	9	8	2	3
Jesse Hahn	0	1	5.40	3	0	0	5	6	4	3	5	3
Sauryn Lao	0	0	8.10	2	0	0	3 1/3	6	4	3	1	4
José Castillo	1	0	0.00	3	0	0	3	3	1	0	2	1
Blas Castaño	0	0	9.00	1	0	0	3	4	3	3	2	1
Brandyn Garcia	0	0	4.50	2	0	0	2	4	2	1	3	1
Jhonathan Díaz	0	0	0.00	1	0	0	1 1/3	1	0	0	0	1
Leo Rivas	0	0	0.00	1	0	0	1	3	0	0	1	0
Miles Mastrobuoni	0	0	0.00	1	0	0	1	1	0	0	2	0
**Totals**	**90**	**72**	**3.87**	**162**	**162**	**43**	**1462 2/3**	**1331**	**694**	**629**	**454**	**1426**

== Postseason ==
=== Game log ===
2025 Postseason game log: 6–6 (Home: 3–3; Away: 3–3)
AL Division Series: 3–2 (Home: 2–1; Away: 1–1)

#	Date	Opponent	Score	Win	Loss	Save	Attendance	Record
1	October 4	Tigers	2–3 (11)	Vest (1–0)	**Vargas** (0–1)	Montero (1)	47,290	0–1
2	October 5	Tigers	3–2	**Brash** (1–0)	Finnegan (0–1)	**Muñoz** (1)	47,371	1–1
3	October 7	@ Tigers	8–4	**Gilbert** (1–0)	Flaherty (0–1)	―	41,525	2–1
4	October 8	@ Tigers	3–9	Melton (1–1)	**Speier** (0–1)	―	37,069	2–2
5	October 10	Tigers	3–2 (15)	**L. Castillo** (1–0)	Kahnle (0–1)	―	47,025	3–2

AL Championship Series: 3–4 (Home: 1–2; Away: 2–2)

#	Date	Opponent	Score	Win	Loss	Save	Attendance	Record
1	October 12	@ Blue Jays	3–1	**Miller** (1–0)	Gausman (1–1)	**Muñoz** (2)	44,474	1–0
2	October 13	@ Blue Jays	10–3	**Bazardo** (1–0)	Yesavage (1–1)	―	44,814	2–0
3	October 15	Blue Jays	4–13	Bieber (1–0)	**Kirby** (0–1)	―	46,471	2–1
4	October 16	Blue Jays	2–8	Scherzer (1–0)	**L. Castillo** (1–1)	―	46,981	2–2
5	October 17	Blue Jays	6–2	**Speier** (1–1)	Little (0–1)	―	46,758	3–2
6	October 19	@ Blue Jays	2–6	Yesavage (2–1)	**Gilbert** (1–1)	―	44,764	3–3
7	October 20	@ Blue Jays	3–4	Gausman (2–1)	**Bazardo** (1–1)	Hoffman (2)	44,770	3–4

Legend: = Win = Loss = Postponement
**Bold** = Mariners team member

=== Postseason rosters ===
Playoff rosters
American League Division Series

- Pitchers: 26 Emerson Hancock 36 Logan Gilbert 43 Caleb Ferguson 47 Matt Brash 50 Bryce Miller 54 Carlos Vargas 55 Gabe Speier 58 Luis Castillo 68 George Kirby 75 Andrés Muñoz 77 Luke Jackson 83 Eduard Bazardo
- Catchers: 5 Harry Ford 18 Mitch Garver 29 Cal Raleigh
- Infielders: 3 J. P. Crawford 7 Jorge Polanco 9 Ben Williamson 12 Josh Naylor 28 Eugenio Suárez 76 Leo Rivas
- Outfielders: 8 Dominic Canzone 10 Víctor Robles 20 Luke Raley 44 Julio Rodríguez 56 Randy Arozarena

American League Championship Series

- Pitchers: 22 Bryan Woo 26 Emerson Hancock 36 Logan Gilbert 43 Caleb Ferguson 47 Matt Brash 50 Bryce Miller 54 Carlos Vargas 55 Gabe Speier 58 Luis Castillo 68 George Kirby 75 Andrés Muñoz 77 Luke Jackson 83 Eduard Bazardo
- Catchers: 5 Harry Ford 18 Mitch Garver 29 Cal Raleigh
- Infielders: 3 J. P. Crawford 7 Jorge Polanco 12 Josh Naylor 21 Miles Mastrobuoni 28 Eugenio Suárez 76 Leo Rivas
- Outfielders: 8 Dominic Canzone 10 Víctor Robles 44 Julio Rodríguez 56 Randy Arozarena

=== American League Division Series ===
During their bye period, the Mariners scheduled two intra-squad scrimmage games at T-Mobile Park that were open to the public. On October 1, the "away" team won 6–1 in front of approximately 5,000 people in six innings. Hall of Famer Ichiro Suzuki played for the "home" squad in right field. The Mariners left pitcher Bryan Woo off the American League Division Series (ALDS) roster due to a pectoral injury he suffered in September.

The Detroit Tigers beat the Guardians in three games in Cleveland in the Wild Card Series to advance to the ALDS against the Mariners. The Tigers won Game 1 in Seattle in 11 innings, 3–2. Julio Rodríguez hit a home run as he and Cal Raleigh combined for 6 hits, but no other Mariners got a hit. Starter George Kirby allowed a two-run home run to left-handed hitting Kerry Carpenter, as manager Dan Wilson kept lefty reliever Gabe Speier in the bullpen. The Mariners evened the series, winning Game 2, 3–2. Jorge Polanco hit two home runs, the fourth player in franchise history to do so in a playoff game. Both home runs were solo shots off reigning Cy Young Award winner Tarik Skubal After Spencer Torkelson's game-tying two-RBI single in the top of the 8th inning, Rodríguez hit game-winning RBI double in the bottom of the 8th inning. Closer Andrés Muñoz earned the save. The win was the team's first home postseason win since 2001.

The Mariners split Games 3 and 4 of the series in Detroit. Logan Gilbert allowed one run in six innings and Raleigh, Eugenio Suárez, and J. P. Crawford hit home runs in Game 3. After Caleb Ferguson could not retire any batters in the 9th inning, allowing 3 runs, Muñoz closed out the 8–4 win. The next day, Josh Naylor scored twice as the Mariners led 3–0 after the top of the 5th inning. However, a Naylor double was the only Mariners extra base hit. The Tigers responded with three home runs as starter Bryce Miller was pulled in the bottom of the fifth, and his replacement, Speier, took the loss in a 9–3 game.

Game 5 was the longest winner-take-all game in MLB postseason history. Naylor scored first in the second inning, after a double and stolen base, then sacrifice fly by Mitch Garver. Skubal, in his second series start, got 13 strikeouts, including 7 in a row following the Naylor's run. Kirby pitched 5 scoreless innings before being pulled after a Javier Báez double to lead off the 6th inning. Speier promptly gave up a two-run home run to Carpenter. The Mariners tied the game at 2 in the 7th on a pinch hit by Leo Rivas. Both teams were held scoreless for the next 7 innings, with multiple-inning relief appearances by Matt Brash, Gilbert, and Eduard Bazardo for the Mariners and Will Vest and Keider Montero for Detroit. With the bases loaded and one out in the bottom of the 15th, Polanco hit a walk-off single to right field, sending Seattle to the American League Championship Series for the first time since 2001.

=== American League Championship Series ===
The Mariners made two changes to their roster for the ALCS. Starting pitcher Bryan Woo and utility player Miles Mastrobuoni replaced third baseman Ben Williamson and outfielder Luke Raley.

In Game 1, George Springer belted Bryce Miller's first pitch for a leadoff home run, spotting Toronto an early 1–0 lead. It was the only run Seattle allowed in the game and one of two Toronto hits. Miller, throwing on short rest after starting Game 4 of the ALDS, pitched an efficient six innings. Cal Raleigh tied the game in the top of the 6th inning, hitting a home run off starter Kevin Gausman. After walking Julio Rodríguez, Gausman was relieved by Brendon Little. Rodríguez advanced to second base on a wild pitch, then Jorge Polanco hit an RBI single, putting the Mariners in the lead. Polanco hit another RBI single in the 8th inning, scoring Randy Arozarena. Relievers Gabe Speier, Matt Brash, and Andrés Muñoz each threw a perfect inning on 8 pitches, with Muñoz earning his second postseason save. The Mariners had not won an ALCS game since Game 3 of the 2001 ALCS.

Three home runs powered the Mariners to a Game 2 win. Rodríguez hit a three-run home run in the top of the first inning, staking the Mariners an early lead. Within two innings, the Blue Jays evened the score. In the bottom of the first inning, Springer scored on a throwing error by Josh Naylor to first base and Alejandro Kirk hit an RBI single. Logan Gilbert allowed a walk and two singles, including a two-out RBI single to Nathan Lukes, in the second inning. Gilbert, after pitching in Games 3 and 5 of the ALDS, lasted three innings, leaving with the game tied 3–3. His counterpart, Trey Yesavage, was pulled after allowing the first two batters to reach in the fifth inning. Reliever Louis Varland struck out Rodríguez, but Polanco then hit a three-run home run, restoring the Mariners lead. Seattle added on in the sixth inning after a Mitch Garver triple with an RBI single by J. P. Crawford. Naylor hit a two-run home run in the seventh inning off Braydon Fisher. Toronto used three pitchers that inning, with Crawford hitting a sacrifice fly off Chris Bassitt for the game's final run. Mariners relievers did not allow any runs for the second consecutive game. Eduard Bazardo, Carlos Vargas, and Emerson Hancock each pitched two innings to secure the 10–3 win.

The Blue Jays won Games 3 and 4, to even the series at two games each. The Mariners won Game 5, to take a 3–2 series lead. The Mariners subsequently lost Game 6, bringing the series to a winner-take-all Game 7.

The Mariners took an early lead with a Julio Rodriguez double that Josh Naylor drove in on an RBI single in the 1st inning, a Rodriguez solo homerun in the 3rd inning, and a Raleigh solo homerun in the 5th inning, bringing the score to 3-1 with starter George Kirby only allowing one run. Kirby was replaced in the 5th, and Woo was subbed in to pitch. However, the Mariners' lead ended tragically in the 7th inning after Bryan Woo was taken out after walking two batters in favor of right-handed reliever Eduard Bazardo, who gave up a three-run homerun to George Springer on a 1-0 pitch, which brought the Blue Jays to a 4-3 lead. The Mariners did not reclaim the lead of the game despite several base hits and lost the game on a six-pitch, three-ball, three-strike swing and miss to Rodriguez, of which all the pitches were out of the strike zone. Ending the Mariners' postseason just one game away from the World Series, the closest they've ever been to an appearance.

== Awards and honors ==
=== All-Star Game ===
Cal Raleigh was selected by fan voting as the starting catcher in the All-Star Game. Andrés Muñoz, Julio Rodríguez, and Bryan Woo were selected as reserves for the game. Rodríguez chose not to attend, and Randy Arozarena was named his replacement. Raleigh won the Home Run Derby. In the game, Raleigh was 1-for-2, Arozarena 0-for-3, Woo pitched a scoreless third inning, and Muñoz got two outs in the 8th inning.

=== All-MLB team ===
Cal Raleigh and Julio Rodríguez were named to the All-MLB Team at catcher and outfielder, respectively. Woo and Muñoz were named to the All-MLB second team. It was the first selection for each player, except Rodríguez, who was named to the second team in 2022.

=== Regular season awards ===
Raleigh finished second in AL Most Valuable Player Award voting to Aaron Judge, but took home other top honors. He won the MLB Player of the Year Award from the MLB Players Association, the Sporting News, and Baseball Digest. He also won the AL Outstanding Player from the players association. He also won the Silver Slugger Award as the best hitting AL catcher.

Rodríguez was a finalist for the Gold Glove Award in center field, losing to Cedanne Rafaela.

=== In-season awards ===
Raleigh was named the AL Player of the Month for June. Muñoz was named the AL Reliever of the Month for March/April.

Raleigh won two AL Player of the Week awards, for the weeks of May 26–June 1 and June 16–22. Two Mariners won consecutive Player of the Week awards early in the season, with Dylan Moore winning for April 14–20 and Jorge Polanco winning for April 21–27.

== Farm system ==
Level	Team	League	Manager
AAA	Tacoma Rainiers	Pacific Coast League	John Russell
AA	Arkansas Travelers	Texas League	Ryan Scott
High-A	Everett AquaSox	Northwest League	Zach Vincej
A	Modesto Nuts	California League	Luis Caballero
Rookie	ACL Mariners	Arizona Complex League	Rico Reyes
Foreign Rookie	DSL Mariners	Dominican Summer League	Luis Matias

The Everett AquaSox won the Northwest League championship, which was Zach Vincej's third consecutive title managing a Mariners minor league team.

The Tacoma Rainers were swept in the Pacific Coast League championship.

The Modesto Nuts played their final season in 2025. The Mariners sold the Single-A team in December 2024 to Diamond Baseball Holdings. After the local government would not fund improvements to Modesto's stadium, Diamond planned to move the franchise after the 2025 season to San Bernardino, California to become the Inland Empire 66ers, part of several changes in affiliation agreements with Diamond teams. Diamond owns more than 40 other minor league teams, including the Mariners Double-A affiliate, the Arkansas Travelers. The final game in Modesto was on August 31.
