= Etsy witches =

Internet witchcraft vendors

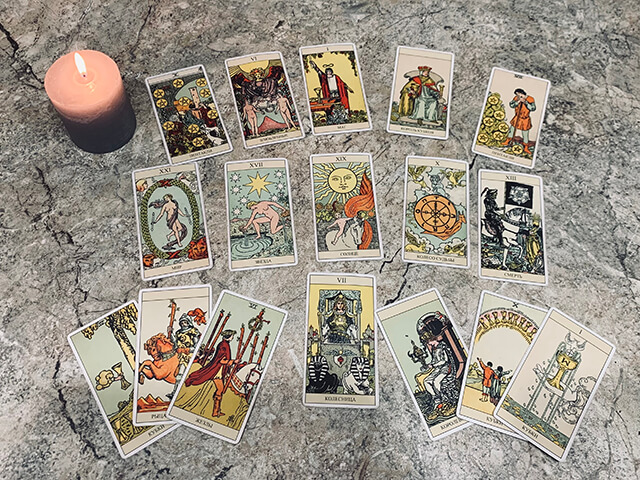
Tarot cards are a staple of neopagan witchcraft.

Etsy witches is a colloquial term used to describe people who provide internet witchcraft services, particularly through online marketplaces such as Etsy or TikTok. Rooted in spiritualism, and similar in practice to psychics and mediums, Etsy Witches perform "metaphysical services", usually in exchange for a fee. Many practitioners purport adherence to neopagan witchcraft, often Wicca, and exploit the related trends of alternative medicine wellness and feminist reclamation witchcraft.

In the 2020s, the popularity of online witches and related services increased due to the "WitchTok" trend on TikTok. The practice was also highly publicised in 2025 following the death of Charlie Kirk, who was "cursed" by Etsy witches just days prior.

== Background ==
Academic Venetia Robertson noted that from the beginning, Neopagan users established a community on "Usenet, the precursor to the world wide web," before other religious groups began sharing their doctrines; however, tracing examples of online witchcraft rituals is "notoriously difficult" due to the limits of what exists in digital archives as well as what has "been lost when domain registrations expire and pages become defunct". T.M. Brown of The New York Times stated "the business of witchcraft is nearly as old as the practice itself", noting that customers are no longer "dialing psychics from the phone book" which has led to the development of online storefronts by entrepreneurs. The economic role of "magical practices" has evolved alongside broader societal changes with practitioners following the shift to digital spaces as commerce moved online. Robertson opined that "ever-increasing exposure on the internet has introduced Witchcraft into the homes of many, but it is subsequently vulnerable to commodification and corruption", highlighting the increased visibility of "magic for profit" and "the instant convenience of online shopping".

Providers of internet witchcraft services are colloquially referred to as Etsy witches. These services are often found alongside the wellness subculture, popularised by wellness influencers who promote similar spiritual practices. Witches' services range from providing spells of good fortune, to revenge and curses. Fortune surrounding life milestones, such as weddings or careers, are common subjects of spell services. Online shops may also include physical objects for at home witchcraft practices.

== History ==
While internet witchcraft services are a perennial feature of online marketplace spaces, they have faced restrictions over time. eBay reportedly acted as a storefront for around 100,000 metaphysical products up until 2012, when intangible goods and services were banned from the platform. Among the item categories taken down were spells, curses and hexes, in addition to blessings and healings, and magic potions. The change drew criticism and a petition to reverse the change from the seller community, who likened the ban to religious persecution. The seller community would migrate to websites such as Craigslist, Bonanza, and especially Etsy.

Etsy, too, banned supernatural services in 2015, reinforcing their terms of service that prohibited the sale of intangible items or services. Witchcraft on the website would persist, however, with spells and curses being described by sellers as “entertainment services". The classification as 'entertainment' is more salient in providing legal protection from consumers seeking remedy for failed spells, with the site ban being poorly enforced. Many sellers circumvent the tangible item requirements by sending customers digital images or certificates. In 2025, both The Wall Street Journal and Fast Company described it as a flourishing "cottage industry" and highlighted the popular category of romance spells. The Wall Street Journal noted that "magic practitioners sell on Instagram, Shopify and TikTok, but most customers say Etsy is their go-to". The Financial Times commented that popularity and "publicity increased the visibility of the witches" on Etsy in 2025, "which in turn directed interest towards Etsy's house rules forbidding the sale of services like spells" and that "the enforcement of a previously neglected rule leaves a shrinking pool of options for Etsy witches to peddle their trade – despite the high customer demand". In 2026, Vice reported some Etsy witches "compared the crackdown to a modern witch hunt, language that quickly spread online", and that as a result of Etsy's enforcement, "some sellers have moved to personal websites or niche platforms like Witchly".

Internet witches had a boom in popularity on TikTok in the 2020s, with associated hashtags amassing billions of views. Academic Chris Miller noted that "WitchTok" encompasses "a digital subculture of self-identified Witches from various backgrounds", where boundaries between traditions are "often blurry" in online settings. In the book TikTok Cultures in the United States (2022), Jane Barnette stated that "while several WitchTok creators also offer occult services, generally speaking, the purpose of the witch subculture on this platform is both aesthetic and educational". In contrast, Miller noted that consumerism is seen throughout WitchTok videos where many "fetishize consumer goods" or promote businesses such as Etsy shops and the "similarities among Witches on TikTok and Pagans more broadly prompt a reconsideration of the role of consumerism within Witchcraft". This popularity has also prompted concerns of predatory sales.

=== Public figures ===
Donald Trump has attracted multiple publicised spells, including following his 2017 inauguration, and after the January 6 Capitol attack. Elon Musk, who drew significant ire during his tenure in the Trump Administration, was also the recipient of internet witch curses. During the 2025 Seattle Mariners season, one of the team's superstitions during a winning stretch included fans embracing a spell by an Etsy Witch.

In mid-2025, the popularity of Etsy Witches led feminist website Jezebel to publish an 8 September 2025 satirical article which characterised Charlie Kirk as a far-right misogynist and described commissioning a "curse" to afflict him with irritations and inconveniences using "the collective feminist power of the Etsy coven". Kirk was killed two days after the article was published, on 10 September 2025. The website then removed the article, citing their condemnation of political violence and compassion for Kirk's family. The article attracted attention in the media due to the untimely coincidence and online criticism. One of the "witches" who "cursed" Kirk made a statement that she did not claim responsibility for his death, but described her magic as "effective", which "can manifest in unthinkable ways". Later, she apologised, saying that she regretted any distress caused to the family.

== Attitudes and reception ==
Internet witches attract similar criticism to mediums and psychics. Their "magic" services have been described as "modern day snake oil", performed by "predatory scammers". The marketplace websites' bans on metaphysical services, which are easily skirted, were instituted because the sales can be readily regarded as fraud. Elaine Moore of the Financial Times commented that while interactions with Etsy witches often have a "tongue in cheek" tone, it is also a "highly lucrative" industry. However, she noted that Etsy witches ended 2025 in a "diminished" state following the Jezebel satire article and the subsequent assassination of Kirk as this event "recast their reputation from goofy to sinister". Ashley Fike of Vice commented that Etsy's increased enforcement of its ban in 2026 could be called either "moderation" or "a witch hunt. Either way, Etsy spent years collecting fees before deciding where the line was".

Academic Emily D. Crews explained that "the rise of Etsy witches mirrors a broader shift in American religious life", noting the decline of institutional religion and that as a replacement "many Americans – especially millennials and Gen Z – are pivoting toward belief systems that borrow from multiple traditions". Crews stated "it makes sense, in this kind of religious landscape, that someone might just as easily seek help from a witch than from a priest or a rabbi or a sacred text". Although advocates suggest that purchasing online witchcraft can confer a sense of empowerment or control, the practice has been lambasted as a commodification of people's search for meaning, trading in "hope, fear and heartbreak”. Pilar Melendez of NBC News highlighted the high demand of Etsy witches in 2025, opining that "amid rising economic uncertainty, burnout and increasing political division, the popularity of the Etsy witch seems like an easy escape that doesn't require a massive financial leap of faith – just a spiritual one". Libby Rodney of The Harris Poll used Etsy witches as an example of a market trend where consumers are looking for "alternative ways to achieve a good outcome", noting that it is "tied to the lottery economy and consumers seeking control over their lives". Moore opined that the "strangest spectacle" occurs when the spells fail as buyers seem "to take the whole endeavour in good humour – aware that what they were doing was ridiculous". In 2026, Tammy LaGorce of The New York Times reported on the trend of people purchasing weather-related services for weddings; an Etsy spokeswoman stated "searches for weather-related spells and witches" were up 206% compared to 2025.
