= Rhylan Thomas =

American baseball player (born 2000)

Free agent
- Outfielder
- Born: April 15, 2000 (age 26); Ventura, California, U.S.
- Bats: Left Throws: Left

MLB debut
- May 2, 2025, for the Seattle Mariners

MLB statistics (through 2025 season)
- Batting average: .125
- Home runs: 0
- Runs batted in: 2
- Stats at Baseball Reference

Teams
- Seattle Mariners (2025)

Rhylan Christopher Thomas (born April 15, 2000) is an American professional baseball outfielder who is a free agent. He has previously played in Major League Baseball (MLB) for the Seattle Mariners. He made his MLB debut in 2025.

== Career ==
=== Amateur ===
Thomas attended Oaks Christian High School in Westlake Village, California, playing baseball for coach Royce Clayton. He was named to the All-Marmonte League team three times and the Ventura County Star All-County Team his senior season. He then attended the University of Southern California, playing college baseball for the Trojans. He batted .335/.389/.423 in three seasons, earning All Pac-12 honorable mention and All-Defensive team honors in 2022. In 2021, he played summer baseball for the Orleans Firebirds in the Cape Cod Baseball League.

=== New York Mets ===
The New York Mets selected Thomas in the 11th round, with the 329th overall selection, of the 2022 Major League Baseball draft. He made his professional debut that summer with the rookie-level Florida Complex League Mets and Single-A St. Lucie Mets. The Mets named Thomas the team's best minor league defensive outfielder in 2023; in 91 games split between St. Lucie, the High-A Brooklyn Cyclones, and Double-A Binghamton Rumble Ponies, he slashed .328/.407/.425 with three home runs, 27 RBI, and seven stolen bases.

=== Seattle Mariners ===
On July 26, 2024, the Mets traded Thomas to the Seattle Mariners for reliever Ryne Stanek. He joined the Triple-A Tacoma Rainiers for the rest of the season.

Thomas returned to the Rainiers to begin the 2025 season, slashing .319/.363/.362 in 26 games. On April 30, Thomas was selected to the 40-man roster and promoted to the major leagues for the first time, replacing the injured Luke Raley. On May 2, Thomas made his MLB debut against the Texas Rangers, collecting a hit and two RBI. After batting 1-for-8 in three games with the Mariners, Thomas was optioned back to Tacoma on May 7, with Leody Taveras taking his spot on Seattle's roster and in the outfield. Thomas continued to hit in the minors, leading all minor league players with 178 hits, batting .325/.380/.411, with more walks than strikeouts.

Thomas began the 2026 season in Triple-A Tacoma. In 31 games for the Rainiers, he batted .260/.313/.328 with two home runs, nine RBI, and six stolen bases. On May 3, he was designated for assignment by the Mariners.

=== Houston Astros ===
On May 9, 2026, Thomas was claimed off waivers by the Houston Astros and optioned to the Triple–A Sugar Land Space Cowboys. In 10 appearances for Sugar Land, he batted .229/.275/.229 with three RBI and two walks. Thomas was designated for assignment by the Astros on June 4. He was released by Houston the following day.

=== Toronto Blue Jays ===
On June 15, 2026, Thomas signed a minor league contract with the Toronto Blue Jays organization. He elected free agency on November 2.
