= 2025 Major League Baseball Home Run Derby =

Baseball competition

- Date: July 14, 2025
- Venue: Truist Park
- City: Atlanta, Georgia
- Winner: Cal Raleigh
- Score: 18–15

The 2025 Major League Baseball Home Run Derby was a home run hitting contest between eight batters from Major League Baseball (MLB). The derby was held on July 14, 2025, at Truist Park in Atlanta, Georgia, the site of the 2025 MLB All-Star Game. It aired on ESPN for the 31st and final time. The event was won by Cal Raleigh of the Seattle Mariners.

== Rules ==
=== Round one ===
The contestants are allowed 40 pitches, which must all be thrown in three minutes or less, to hit as many home runs as possible. The timer begins with the release of the first pitch, and the round ends when the timer hits zero. A home run will count if the timer hits zero, so long as the pitch was released beforehand. Each contestant is entitled to one 45-second timeout in each regulation period.

After the time expires, the contestants enter a bonus period, where they attempt to hit as many home runs as possible before they record three outs (any swing that is not a home run). There is no time limit in the bonus period. Additionally, if a contestant hits a home run that travels at least 425 feet (129.5 m) during the bonus period, they earn an additional out to work with.

Ties in this round are broken by the distance of each contestant's longest home run. The top four contestants advance to the next round.

=== Semifinals ===
The contestants are seeded based on their performance in the previous round (1 vs 4, 2 vs 3). The lower seed in each matchup will hit first.

In this round, the time limit is shortened to two minutes and the pitch limit is shortened to 27 pitches. Ties in this round are broken by a 60-second tiebreaker with no bonus period or timeouts. If a tie remains, the contestants will engage in successive three-swing swing-offs until there is a winner. The winners of each matchup advance to the finals.

=== Finals ===
In the final round, the rules remain the same as in the semifinals. The contestant with the most home runs is declared champion.

== Results ==
Truist Park, Atlanta
Player	Team	Round one	Semifinals	Finals	Total
Cal Raleigh	Seattle Mariners	17^{#}	19	18	54
Junior Caminero	Tampa Bay Rays	21	8	15	44
Oneil Cruz	Pittsburgh Pirates	21	13	−	34
Byron Buxton	Minnesota Twins	20	7	−	27
Brent Rooker	Athletics	17^{#}	−	−	17
James Wood	Washington Nationals	16	−	−	16
Matt Olson (Note: Olson replaced teammate Ronald Acuña Jr.)	Atlanta Braves	15	−	−	15
Jazz Chisholm Jr.	New York Yankees	3	−	−	3

Semifinals
1	Oneil Cruz	13
4	Cal Raleigh	19
3	Byron Buxton	7
2	Junior Caminero	8

Finals
4	Cal Raleigh	18
2	Junior Caminero	15

# Raleigh advanced via a distance tiebreaker of .08 feet (0.96 in; 2.4 cm)—470.62 to 470.54.
