= Leo Rivas =

Venezuelan baseball player (born 1997)

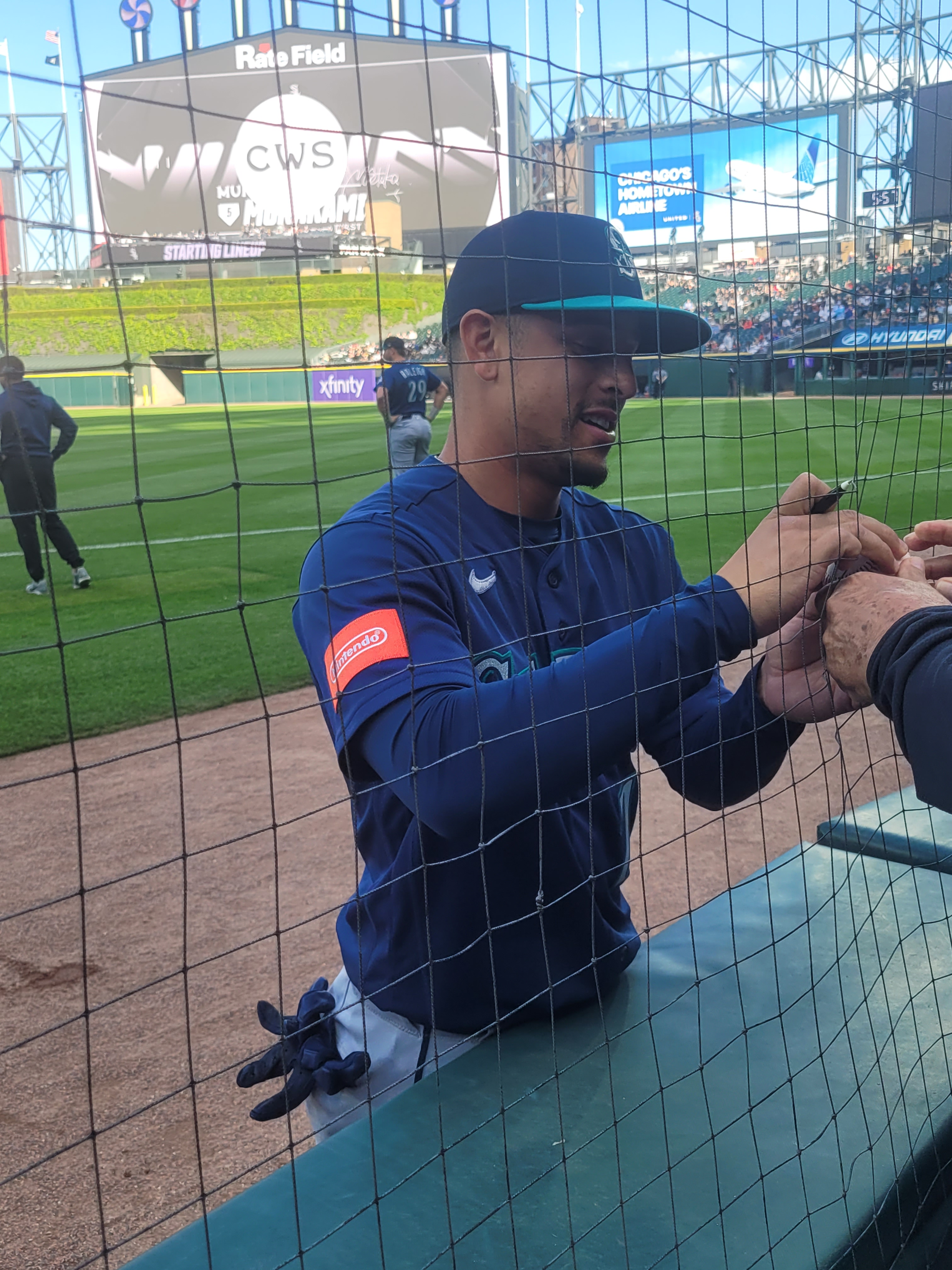
- Leo Rivas signing a baseball

Seattle Mariners – No. 76
- Infielder
- Born: October 10, 1997 (age 28); Maracay, Venezuela
- Bats: Switch Throws: Right

MLB debut
- April 28, 2024, for the Seattle Mariners

MLB statistics (through 2026 season)
- Batting average: .202
- Home runs: 2
- Runs batted in: 28
- Stats at Baseball Reference

Teams
- Seattle Mariners (2024–present)

Leonardo Andres Rivas (born October 10, 1997) is a Venezuelan professional baseball infielder for the Seattle Mariners of Major League Baseball (MLB). He made his MLB debut in 2024.

== Career ==
=== Los Angeles Angels ===
Rivas signed with the Los Angeles Angels as an international free agent on July 11, 2014, receiving a $40,000 signing bonus. He made his professional debut in 2015 with the Dominican Summer League (DSL) Angels, hitting .258 in 65 games. Rivas returned to the DSL to start 2016, then advanced to the rookie-level Arizona League (AZL) Angels on July 20, accumulating a .290/.413/.379 slash line with one home run, 19 RBI, and 26 stolen bases across 59 games for both teams.

Rivas split the 2017 season between the Rookie-level Orem Owlz and Single-A Burlington Bees. He was named a Pioneer League All-Star for Orem. In 61 games between the two affiliates, he hit .286/.443/.397 with two home runs, 36 RBI, and 19 stolen bases. Rivas spent 2018 with Burlington, also playing in two games for the AZL Angels in July. In a career-high 119 games for Burlington, he batted .234/.335/.326 with four home runs, 34 RBI, and 16 stolen bases. His 140 strikeouts also were a career high.

Rivas spent the 2019 season primarily with the High-A Inland Empire 66ers, while also playing 7 games for the AZL Angels, slashing .227/.332/.361 with six home runs and 26 RBI across 80 games. He did not play in a game in 2020 due to the cancellation of the minor league season because of the COVID-19 pandemic.

=== Cincinnati Reds ===
On December 10, 2020, Rivas was traded to the Cincinnati Reds as the player to be named later in a trade that sent reliever Raisel Iglesias to the Angels and Noé Ramirez to Cincinnati.

Rivas spent the 2021 season with the Double-A Chattanooga Lookouts, playing in 60 games and batting .274/.382/.337 with 21 RBI and nine stolen bases. Rivas returned to Chattanooga for most of the 2022 season before moving up to the Triple-A Louisville Bats in mid-August. In 95 games for the two affiliates, he hit .228/.318/.344 with a career-best seven home runs as well as 35 RBI and 18 stolen bases. Rivas elected free agency following the season on November 10.

=== Seattle Mariners ===
On January 30, 2023, Rivas signed a minor league contract with the Seattle Mariners. He spent the year with the Double-A Arkansas Travelers, batting .255/.411/.347 with five home runs and career highs of 47 RBI and 50 stolen bases in 106 games.

Rivas began 2024 with the Triple-A Tacoma Rainiers. On April 25, Rivas was selected to the 40-man roster and promoted to the major leagues for the first time. He replaced injured shortstop J.P. Crawford on the roster. He made his MLB debut on April 28 against the Arizona Diamondbacks and recorded his first major league hit, a triple. He was optioned back to Tacoma on May 20, when Crawford came off the injured list.

Rivas shuttled between the majors and minors, returning to the Mariners' roster from June 10 to 13 as Dylan Moore took paternity leave, then again from July 23 through the end of the season. On August 23, Rivas notched his first career walk-off hit, singling in the 10th inning to beat the San Francisco Giants. Rivas pitched one inning during two Mariners blowout losses, to the Detroit Tigers on August 13 and the New York Yankees September 17, allowing one run and two hits across his two pitching appearances. He finished his rookie season batting .233/.333/.274 with three stolen bases in three attempts.

Rivas was optioned to Triple-A Tacoma to begin the 2025 season. He was recalled on April 1. He showed excellent patience early, with a .500 on-base percentage (OBP) through May 4. On May 31, he was optioned back to Tacoma as the team promoted prospect Cole Young. Rivas was recalled to the Mariners on September 1 as rosters expanded and the team released Donovan Solano. That night, Rivas hit his first career major league home run. On September 10, he hit a walk-off two-run home run against the St. Louis Cardinals in the 13th inning, sealing a Mariners series sweep. He received regular playing time at second base in September, replacing the slumping Young. In 48 games in 2025, Rivas batted .244/.387/.333 with two home runs and six stolen bases. In the minors, Rivas was named a postseason Pacific Coast League All-Star, leading the league in OBP.

On October 10 (his 28th birthday), Rivas entered Game 5 of the American League Division Series. Pinch-hitting in the 7th inning with the Mariners trailing the Detroit Tigers 2–1, Rivas hit a game-tying RBI single. He later walked and struck out twice as Seattle won 3–2 in 15 innings, advancing to the American League Championship Series. Rivas batted 2-for-17 with 4 walks in the postseason.

== Personal life ==
Rivas is married and had dated his wife since they both were 15 years old. They have two children.
