= Bryce Miller =

American baseball player (born 1998)

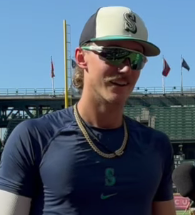
- Miller with the Seattle Mariners in 2024

Kansas City Royals
- Pitcher
- Born: August 23, 1998 (age 28); Mount Pleasant, Texas, U.S.
- Bats: Right Throws: Right

MLB debut
- May 2, 2023, for the Seattle Mariners

MLB statistics (through 2026 season)
- Win–loss record: 28–31
- Earned run average: 4.04
- Strikeouts: 483
- Stats at Baseball Reference

Teams
- Seattle Mariners (2023–2026)

Bryce Austen Miller (born August 23, 1998) is an American professional baseball pitcher for the Kansas City Royals of Major League Baseball (MLB). He made his MLB debut in 2023 with the Seattle Mariners and was traded to the Royals after the 2026 season.

== Career ==
=== Amateur career ===
Miller attended New Braunfels High School in New Braunfels, Texas. He and Jordan Westburg were teammates on the New Braunfels Unicorns baseball team, and both graduated in 2017. They were childhood friends who grew up in the same neighborhood.

Miller began his college baseball career at Blinn College where he had a 7–1 record with 5 saves in 20 relief appearances in 2018. He was drafted by the Miami Marlins in the 38th round of the 2018 Major League Baseball draft but did not sign with the team. He transferred to Texas A&M University, playing for the Aggies baseball team for three seasons. He was a reliever in his first two seasons with the Aggies, leading the team with 3 saves in the shortened 2020 season, before converting to a starting pitcher in 2021.

Miller also played collegiate summer baseball., pitching in 2018 and 2020 for the Texas Collegiate League's Brazos Valley Bombers. In 2019, he played with the Falmouth Commodores of the Cape Cod Baseball League.

=== Seattle Mariners ===
The Seattle Mariners selected Miller in the fourth round with the 113th overall pick of the 2021 Major League Baseball draft. He signed for a $400,000 bonus. He made his professional debut with the Single-A Modesto Nuts, pitching 9 1/3 innings in 5 games with a 4.82 ERA. In 2022, Miller made 27 appearances (26 starts) split between Modesto, the High-A Everett AquaSox, and the Double-A Arkansas Travelers, posting a combined 7–4 record and 3.16 ERA with 163 strikeouts in 133 2/3 innings pitched.

Miller began the 2023 season back with Arkansas, struggling to an 0–2 record and 6.41 ERA in 4 starts in April. On May 1, the Mariners announced that Miller would be promoted to the major leagues for the first time to start against the Oakland Athletics. In his first start, he took a perfect game into the sixth inning before giving up a one-out single to Tony Kemp. He pitched six innings, surrendering one earned run and striking out 10, a Mariners record for most strikeouts in a debut.

Miller had a strong start with the Mariners. In his first three starts, Miller allowed only eight baserunners, breaking the MLB record held since 1901, with a minimum 15 innings pitched. He had the lowest WHIP (0.421) in first three starts in MLB history, also with the minimum threshold of 15 innings. On May 24, Miller became the first pitcher since 1901 to pitch at least six innings while allowing four or fewer hits in his first five career appearances.

Miller landed on the injured list on July 3 with a blister on his finger. He returned to the mound on July 16, picking up his sixth win of the season. Miller's performance tailed off at the end of his rookie season, and he lost his last three decisions. He ended 2023 season with an 8–7 record, a 4.32 ERA, and 119 strikeouts in 131 1/3 innings.

Miller put up an impressive second season with the Mariners in 2024, with a 12–8 record, a 2.98 ERA, and 171 strikeouts in 180 1/3 innings. His ERA was the eighth best in the MLB, while his 1.068 walks and hits per inning pitched ranked fourth in the majors. Seven times during the season, he pitched 7 innings while allowing 0 or 1 run.

In 2025, Miller went on the injured list twice with inflammation in his throwing elbow. He went 4–6 with a 5.68 ERA in 18 starts. He started 2026 on the injured list with an oblique muscle strain. He went 4–10 with a 4.17 ERA in 22 games including his first regular season relief appearance.

=== Kansas City Royals ===
The Mariners traded Miller, José A. Ferrer, and Logan Evans to the Kansas City Royals for Maikel García, James McArthur, and L.P. Langevin on November 18, 2026.

== Personal life ==
In 2024, Miller adopted a hammerhead shark named Chum, which became the Mariners' team shark.

Miller's favorite baseball player growing up was Lance Berkman.
