= Sauryn Lao =

Dominican baseball player (born 1999)

- Lao with the Leones del Escogido in 2026

Hokkaido Nippon-Ham Fighters – No. 30
- Pitcher
- Born: August 14, 1999 (age 27); Barahona, Dominican Republic
- Bats: Right Throws: Right

Professional debut
- MLB: April 22, 2025, for the Seattle Mariners
- NPB: August 18, 2026, for the Hokkaido Nippon-Ham Fighters

MLB statistics (through 2025 season)
- Win-loss record: 1–0
- Earned run average: 4.91
- Strikeouts: 9

NPB statistics (through 2026 season)
- Win-loss record: 0–0
- Earned run average: 3.60
- Strikeouts: 4
- Stats at Baseball Reference

Teams
- Seattle Mariners (2025); Washington Nationals (2025); Hokkaido Nippon-Ham Fighters (2026–present)

Sauryn Lao (born August 14, 1999) is a Dominican professional baseball pitcher for the Hokkaido Nippon-Ham Fighters of Nippon Professional Baseball (NPB). He has previously played in Major League Baseball (MLB) for the Seattle Mariners and Washington Nationals. Lao signed as an international free agent with the Los Angeles Dodgers in 2016 as an infielder. While in the minor leagues, he converted to being a pitcher. He made his MLB debut in 2025 for the Mariners before being claimed by Washington late in the year.

== Career ==
=== Los Angeles Dodgers ===
Lao signed as an infielder with the Los Angeles Dodgers on October 2, 2015, at the age of 16. He made his professional debut in 2016 with the Dominican Summer League Dodgers, and hit .201 in 50 games. Returning to the DSL Dodgers in 2017, Lao slashed .303/.373/.412 with two home runs, 36 RBI, and 19 stolen bases.

Lao helped the rookie-level Arizona League Dodgers win a league championship in 2018, with a two-RBI triple in the final game of the championship series; in 40 regular season appearances, he batted .262/.359/.476 with four home runs, 22 RBI, and four stolen bases. He played in 61 games for the rookie-level Ogden Raptors in 2019, slashing .271/.362/.480 with nine home runs, 45 RBI, and six stolen bases. Lao did not play in a game in 2020 due to the cancellation of the minor league season because of the COVID-19 pandemic.

Lao returned to action in 2021 with the Single-A Rancho Cucamonga Quakes, hitting .244/.330/.419 with career-highs in home runs (11) and RBI (46), as well as five stolen bases. During the 2022 season, Lao converted into a pitcher; in his final season as a position player, he batted .179/.276/.254 with one home run and four RBI in 20 games for the rookie-level Arizona Complex League Dodgers and High-A Great Lakes Loons.

Lao made his first appearance on the mound in 2023, splitting the year between the Rancho Cucamonga, Great Lakes, and the Double-A Tulsa Drillers. In 34 appearances for the three affiliates, he posted a cumulative 4-0 record and 3.79 ERA with 73 strikeouts over 57 innings of work. He reached Triple-A in 2024, logging a 3.74 ERA with 54 strikeouts and two saves in 20 relief appearances split between the Triple-A Oklahoma City Baseball Club and Tulsa. Lao elected free agency following the season on November 4, 2024.

=== Seattle Mariners ===
On December 14, 2024, Lao signed a minor league contract with the Seattle Mariners. He began the 2025 season with the Triple-A Tacoma Rainiers. On April 20, Lao was promoted to the major leagues for the first time. He made his MLB debut on April 22, striking out 3 and allowing an unearned run in 1 2/3 innings against the Boston Red Sox. Lao was designated for assignment by the Mariners on April 30. He cleared waivers and was sent outright to Triple-A on May 2. On August 19, the Mariners added Lao back to their active roster. He pitched once, allowing three runs, including a home run to Kyle Schwarber, against the Philadelphia Phillies in another 1 2/3-inning outing on August 20. The Mariners designated Lao for assignment on September 1.

=== Washington Nationals ===
On September 3, 2025, Lao was claimed off waivers by the Washington Nationals. He pitched in five games for the Nationals, allowing three runs, including a home run to Matt Olson of the Atlanta Braves, in 6 2/3 innings. Lao earned his first MLB win on September 20, pitching a scoreless 10th inning in an 11-inning win over the New York Mets. He ended his first MLB season with a 4.91 ERA, nine strikeouts, and two walks in 11 innings. Lao spent much of the season in Triple-A, with a combined 2–4 record, 3.25 ERA, and 75 strikeouts in 74 2/3 innings for Tacoma and Triple-A Rochester Red Wings.

=== Hokkaido Nippon-Ham Fighters ===
On January 9, 2026, Lao was released by the Nationals in order to allow him to sign with the Hokkaido Nippon-Ham Fighters of Nippon Professional Baseball.
