= Carlos Vargas (baseball) =

Dominican baseball player (born 1999)

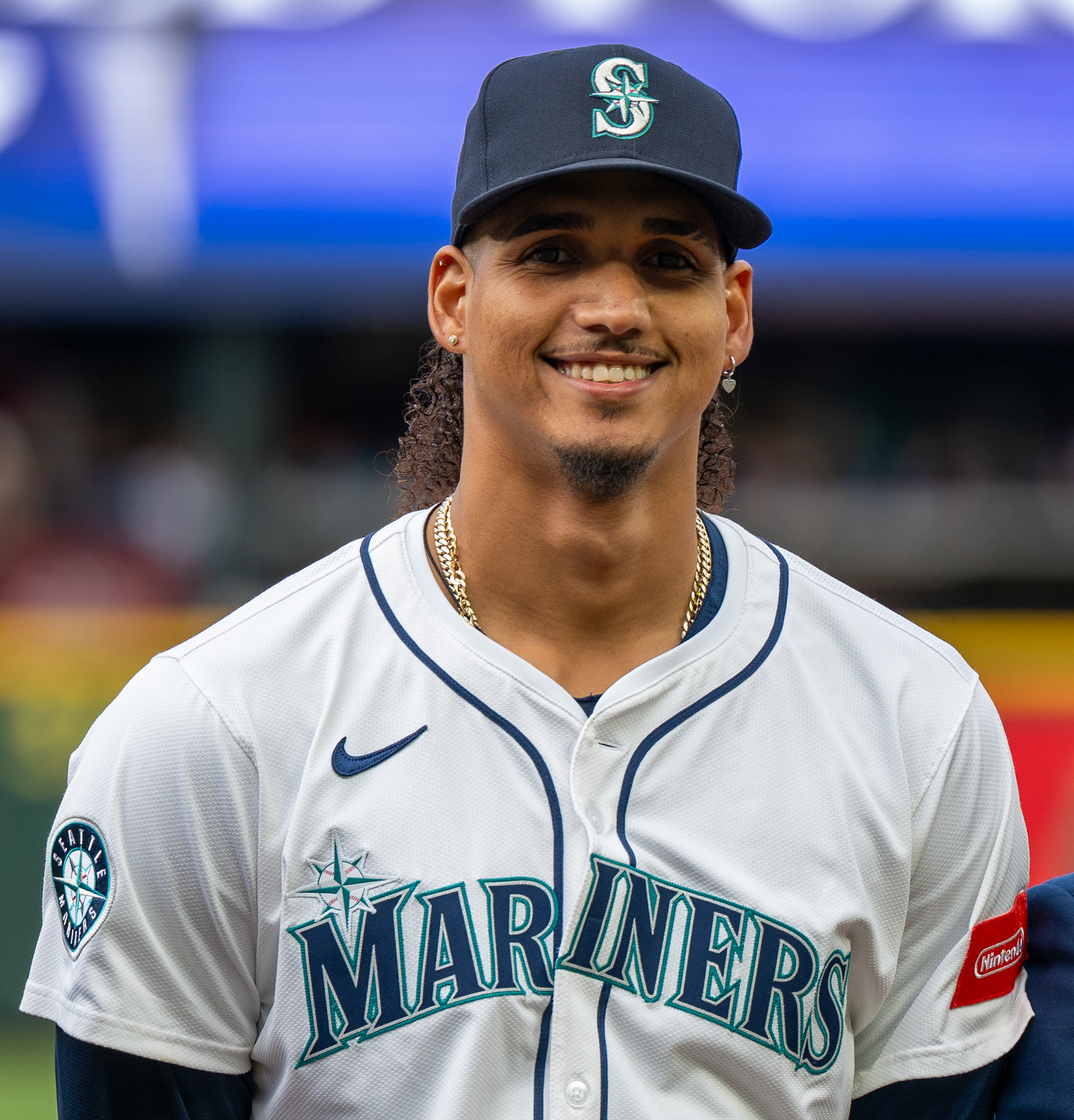
- Vargas with the Seattle Mariners in 2025

Seattle Mariners – No. 54
- Pitcher
- Born: October 13, 1999 (age 26); Moca, Dominican Republic
- Bats: Right Throws: Right

MLB debut
- March 30, 2023, for the Arizona Diamondbacks

MLB statistics (through 2026 season)
- Win–loss record: 8–5
- Earned run average: 4.20
- Strikeouts: 78
- Stats at Baseball Reference

Teams
- Arizona Diamondbacks (2023); Seattle Mariners (2025–present)

Carlos Miguel Vargas (born October 13, 1999) is a Dominican professional baseball pitcher for the Seattle Mariners of Major League Baseball (MLB). He has previously played in MLB for the Arizona Diamondbacks.

== Career ==
=== Cleveland Indians / Guardians ===
Vargas was signed by the Cleveland Indians as an international free agent on July 2, 2016. He made his professional debut in 2018 with the rookie-level Arizona League Indians, for whom he pitched to a 3.93 ERA across 10 games (9 starts). In 2019, Vargas made 15 starts for the Low-A Mahoning Valley Scrappers, registering a 6–4 record and 4.52 ERA with 71 strikeouts across 77 2/3 innings of work. He did not play in a game in 2020 due to the cancellation of the minor league season because of the COVID-19 pandemic.

On November 20, 2020, the Indians added Vargas to their 40-man roster to protect him from the Rule 5 draft. In April 2021, Vargas underwent ulnar collateral ligament reconstruction (Tommy John surgery), causing him to miss the entire 2021 season. He began the 2022 season on the rebranded Cleveland Guardians' major league 60-day injured list as he continued to recover from surgery. Vargas was activated from the injured list on July 18, 2022, and optioned to the Double-A Akron RubberDucks. He was promoted to the Triple-A Columbus Clippers on September 3.

The Guardians promoted Vargas to the major leagues for the first time on September 16, 2022. He was optioned back to Columbus on September 20 without having made an appearance for the Guardians, becoming a phantom ballplayer.

=== Arizona Diamondbacks ===
The Guardians traded Vargas to the Arizona Diamondbacks on November 15, 2022, in exchange for minor league pitcher Ross Carver. Vargas made the Diamondbacks' 2023 Opening Day roster. In five major league appearances for Arizona, he logged a 5.79 ERA with seven strikeouts across 4 2/3 innings. The Diamondbacks optioned Vargas to the Triple-A Reno Aces on April 12, where he spent the remainder of the year.

=== Seattle Mariners ===
On November 22, 2023, the Diamondbacks traded Vargas and catcher Seby Zavala to the Seattle Mariners in exchange for third baseman Eugenio Suárez. He was optioned to the Triple-A Tacoma Rainiers to begin the 2024 season. In 55 appearances for Tacoma, Vargas had a 2–5 record and 3.54 ERA with 40 strikeouts and two saves across 53 1/3 innings pitched.

Vargas made the Mariners' 2025 Opening Day roster. In 70 games, he had 5–5 record and 3.97 ERA, earning his first major league save on May 6.

Vargas was placed on the injured list to begin the 2026 season due to a lat strain. He was transferred to the 60-day injured list on April 8, 2026. Vargas was activated for his season debut on August 21.
