= Casey Legumina =

American baseball player (born 1997)

Tampa Bay Rays – No. 67
- Pitcher
- Born: June 19, 1997 (age 29); Dallas, Texas, U.S.
- Bats: Right Throws: Right

MLB debut
- April 15, 2023, for the Cincinnati Reds

MLB statistics (through 2026 season)
- Win–loss record: 7–8
- Earned run average: 4.90
- Strikeouts: 128
- Stats at Baseball Reference

Teams
- Cincinnati Reds (2023–2024); Seattle Mariners (2025–2026); Tampa Bay Rays (2026–present)

Casey Davey Legumina (born June 19, 1997) is an American professional baseball pitcher for the Tampa Bay Rays of Major League Baseball (MLB). He has previously played in MLB for the Cincinnati Reds and Seattle Mariners.

== Amateur career ==
Legumina attended Basha High School in Chandler, Arizona. His junior year, he set a school record striking out 72 batters as a pitcher. He also hit .345 and led the team in on-base plus slugging. In 2016, his senior season, he batted .443 and was selected for the All-District and All-Section first teams as a designated hitter. He was injured before the season and did not pitch or play defensively. The Toronto Blue Jays drafted him in the 25th round of the 2016 Major League Baseball draft, but he did not sign professionally. Before attending college, he pitched in five summer baseball games for the Wenatchee AppleSox.

Legumina attended Gonzaga University, playing college baseball for the Gonzaga Bulldogs. He had a 5.46 ERA his first season, split between a reliever and starting pitcher. In 2018, he became the team's closer, setting a school record with 12 saves and being named to the All-West Coast Conference first team. He sought advice on being a closer from former Gonzaga teammate and closer Wyatt Mills. The Cleveland Indians drafted Legumina in the 35th round of the 2018 MLB draft, but he again did not sign, returning to Gonzaga. That summer, he played for the Bourne Braves in the Cape Cod League, starting two games and allowing only 1 run in 10 innings. His final season with Gonzaga, he was again a starter, pitching well in limited action. In four games, he had a 1.50 ERA and 29 strikeouts in 24 innings. He showed increased fastball velocity but did not pitch after March 8 due to an arm injury.

== Professional career ==
=== Minnesota Twins ===
The Minnesota Twins selected Legumina in the eighth round, with the 239th overall selection, of the 2019 MLB draft. He signed with the Twins, receiving a $250,000 signing bonus. He had Tommy John surgery on his pitching arm two months after the draft. He did not pitch in the minor leagues until 2021, delayed by surgery and the cancellation of the 2020 minor league season due to the COVID-19 pandemic.

Legumina made his professional debut in May 2021 with the Single-A Fort Myers Mighty Mussels. However, in June, a foul ball hit him in the arm while he was sitting in the dugout, keeping him out of games for a month. He finished the season with one game for the High-A Cedar Rapids Kernels in September. He had a cumulative 4–2 record and 3.28 ERA with 63 strikeouts in 49 1/3 innings pitched across 15 games (9 starts).

Legumina started 2022 with Cedar Rapids and was promoted to the Double-A Wichita Wind Surge after three games. He suffered an elbow contusion in July, missing two weeks of games. He pitched in 33 games (starting 16), with a 2–6 record and 4.80 ERA with 92 strikeouts and three saves in 86 1/3 innings pitched. On November 15, the Twins added Legumina to their 40-man roster to protect him from the Rule 5 draft.

=== Cincinnati Reds ===
On November 18, 2022, the Twins traded Legumina to the Cincinnati Reds for Kyle Farmer. Legumina was optioned to the Triple-A Louisville Bats to begin the 2023 season. He recorded a 1.59 ERA with five strikeouts in 5 2/3 innings pitched for Louisville to begin the year.

On April 15, 2023, the Reds promoted Legumina to the major leagues for the first time. He made his MLB debut that day, pitching the final two innings of a blowout 13–0 win over the Philadelphia Phillies. After one more appearance, he was sent back to Triple-A. He returned to the Reds three more times that season. He earned his first MLB win in April 29, pitching a scoreless eighth inning. He was placed on the injured list with a right ankle contusion in mid-May, then right shoulder pain in late June. In 11 appearances for Cincinnati, he posted a 5.68 ERA with 11 strikeouts across 12 2/3 innings pitched.

Legumina was again optioned to Louisville to begin 2024. He was called up to the Reds three separate times, pitching once each time before returning to the minors, before a September callup that lasted three games before the Reds returned him to Louisville to end the season. He struggled in his six games with Cincinnati, with an 8.68 ERA and 7 strikeouts across 9 1/3 innings pitched. His fastball velocity dropped by almost 1 mile per hour in his limited big league action in 2024. Legumina was designated for assignment by the Reds on January 30, 2025, after the team signed Austin Hays.

=== Seattle Mariners ===
On February 3, 2025, the Seattle Mariners acquired Legumina, sending cash to the Reds. He replaced Jhonathan Díaz on Seattle's 40-man roster. He was optioned to the Triple-A Tacoma Rainiers to begin the season. On April 11, the Mariners recalled Legumina. He debuted for the Mariners on April 15, two years after his MLB debut.

Legumina made eight appearances for Seattle to begin the 2026 campaign, registering an 0–1 record and 4.63 ERA with nine strikeouts across 11 2/3 innings pitched. On April 21, Legumina was designated for assignment by the Mariners.

=== Tampa Bay Rays ===
On April 24, 2026, Legumina was traded to the Tampa Bay Rays in exchange for Ty Cummings.

== Personal life ==
Legumina's father pitched in the minor leagues from 1982 to 1986. Legumina credited his father with providing him good advice on being a pitcher.

Legumina has three siblings. Legumina and his siblings are partners in a restaurant in Gilbert, Arizona owned by their father.

Growing up in Arizona, his favorite Arizona Diamondbacks players were Luis Gonzalez and Junior Spivey.

Legumina has several tattoos on his arms. One is of his father's minor league baseball card. Another includes Jackie Robinson's retired number 42 and the smokestacks at Great American Ball Park, which also references Legumina's MLB debut in Cincinnati on Jackie Robinson Day in 2023.
