= Logan Evans (baseball) =

American baseball player (born 2001)

Kansas City Royals
- Pitcher
- Born: June 5, 2001 (age 25); Ann Arbor, Michigan, U.S.
- Bats: Right Throws: Right

MLB debut
- April 27, 2025, for the Seattle Mariners

MLB statistics (through 2025 season)
- Win–loss record: 6–5
- Earned run average: 4.32
- Strikeouts: 59
- Stats at Baseball Reference

Teams
- Seattle Mariners (2025)

Logan Michael Evans (born June 5, 2001) is an American professional baseball pitcher for the Kansas City Royals of Major League Baseball (MLB). He made his MLB debut in 2025 for the Seattle Mariners.

== Career ==
=== Amateur career ===
Evans attended Saline High School in Saline, Michigan. He played college baseball for the Penn State Nittany Lions for two years before transferring to the Pittsburgh Panthers, where he also played for two years. In 2023, he played collegiate summer baseball with the Bourne Braves of the Cape Cod Baseball League.

=== Seattle Mariners ===
The Seattle Mariners selected Evans in the 12th round of the 2023 Major League Baseball draft. He spent his first professional season with the rookie-level Arizona Complex League Mariners and Single-A Modesto Nuts. He played for the Double-A Arkansas Travelers in 2024.

Evans was assigned to the Triple-A Tacoma Rainiers to begin the 2025 season, posting a 3.86 ERA with 23 strikeouts over five starts. On April 27, Evans was selected to the 40-man roster and promoted to the major leagues for the first time. In his debut that afternoon against the Miami Marlins, Evans earned the win, tossing five innings and allowing two runs with three strikeouts. He made 16 appearances (15 starts) for Seattle during his rookie season, with a 6–5 record, 4.32 ERA, and 59 strikeouts across 81 1/3 innings pitched. Evans wears contact lens as well as non-prescription glasses when he pitches, saying the glasses help protect him and that he has twice been hit in the head by a batted ball.

On January 23, 2026, Evans underwent internal brace elbow surgery to repair his ulnar collateral ligament, ruling him out for the 2026 season. He went on the 60-day injured list in February.

=== Kansas City Royals ===
The Mariners traded Evans, Bryce Miller, and José A. Ferrer to the Kansas City Royals for Maikel García, James McArthur, and L.P. Langevin on November 18, 2026.
