= Cole Young =

American baseball player (born 2003)

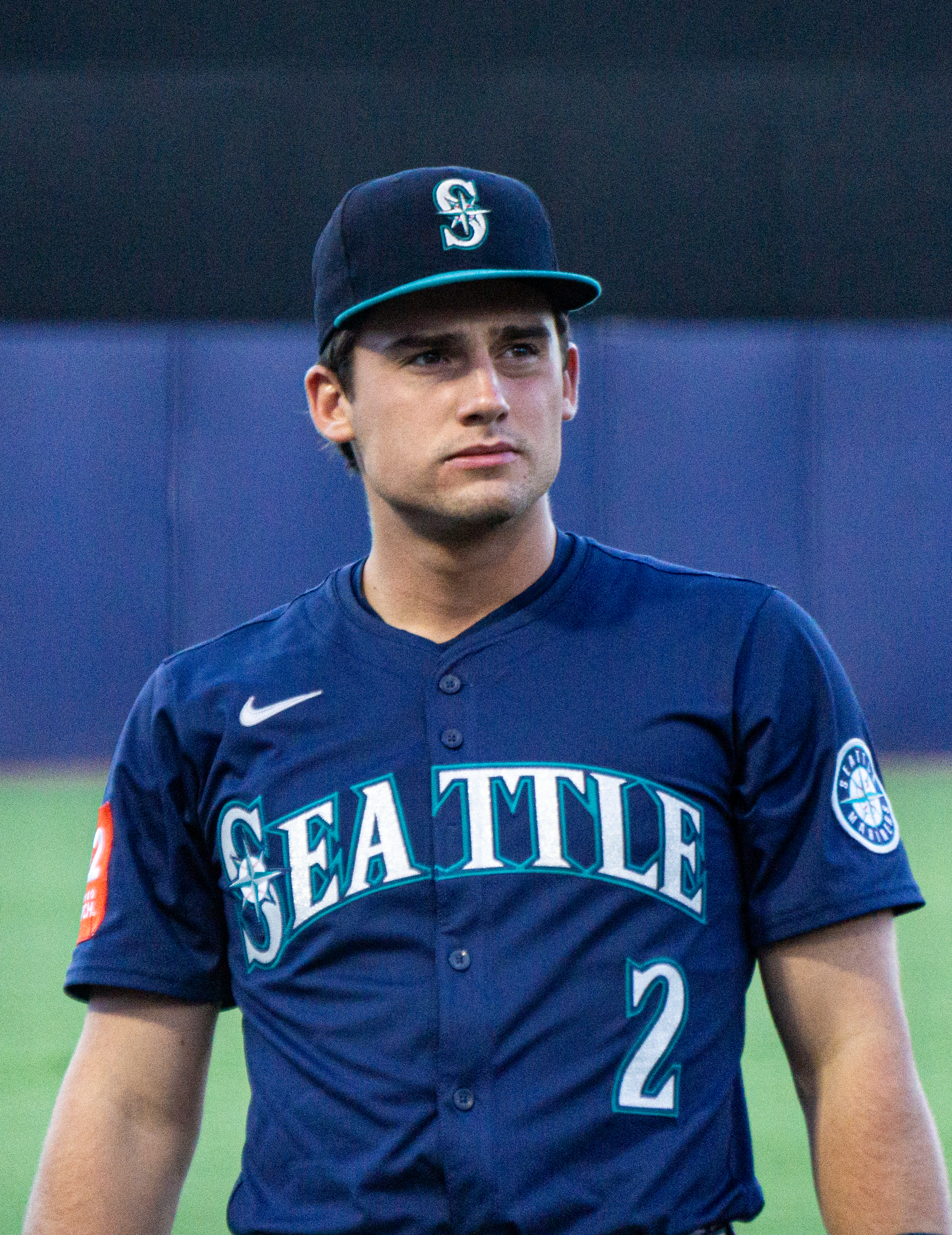
- Young with the Seattle Mariners in 2025

Seattle Mariners – No. 2
- Second baseman / Shortstop
- Born: July 29, 2003 (age 23); Pittsburgh, Pennsylvania, U.S.
- Bats: Left Throws: Right

MLB debut
- May 31, 2025, for the Seattle Mariners

MLB statistics (through 2026 season)
- Batting average: .236
- Home runs: 21
- Runs batted in: 90
- Stats at Baseball Reference

Teams
- Seattle Mariners (2025–present)

Career highlights and awards
- Gold Glove Award (2026)

Cole Douglas Young (born July 29, 2003) is an American professional baseball second baseman and shortstop for the Seattle Mariners of Major League Baseball (MLB). He made his MLB debut in 2025.

== Amateur career ==
Young was raised in Wexford, Pennsylvania, a suburb of Pittsburgh. In 2014, he won Major League Baseball’s national Pitch, Hit & Run competition, held at Target Field, in the 9- and 10-year-old division.

Young attended North Allegheny High School in Wexford. As a high school freshman, Young committed to play college baseball for the Duke Blue Devils. He also was the first freshman to make the Pittsburgh Post-Gazette's All Area team. His sophomore season was canceled due to the COVID-19 pandemic. As a junior, Young batted .437 with 33 runs scored, 23 RBIs and 14 extra-base hits. That summer, Young played in the High School All-American Game at Coors Field, held before the 2021 MLB All-Star Game. As a high school senior, he hit .433 with 2 home runs, topping .400 in every season of high school.

== Professional career ==
=== Draft and Minor Leagues ===
Young was considered a top prospect for the 2022 Major League Baseball draft. The Seattle Mariners selected Young in the first round of the draft, with the 21st overall selection. He signed with the Mariners on July 26 and received a $3.3 million signing bonus. He played for the Arizona Complex League Mariners for one week in August, then moved up to the Modesto Nuts for 10 games. He returned to Modesto for the start of the 2023 season before being promoted to the Everett Aquasox in July. Young hit better after his promotion, with an .884 on-base plus slugging with Everett, up from .825 with Modesto.

Prior to the 2024 season, Young was ranked among the top 70 prospects by MLB.com, Baseball America, Baseball Prospectus, and FanGraphs. During the offseason, Young added 10 pounds of weight through weightlifting training. He spent 2024 with the Double-A Arkansas Travelers, batting .271/.369/.390 with nine home runs and 23 stolen bases. He also played in the 2024 All-Star Futures Game. After the season, Young said he initially tried to hit for more power in 2024 but changed his approach, due in part to playing in a pitcher-friendly home ballpark. After the season, he played one game for the Peoria Javelinas in the Arizona Fall League. He reportedly suffered from wrist discomfort during 2024, which may have limited his fall league availability.

Young began the 2025 season with the Triple-A Tacoma Rainiers. He ranked as a top 60 minor league prospect by several outlets, though FanGraphs ranked him 85th. In 54 appearances for Tacoma, Young batted .277/.392/.461 with five home runs, 26 RBI, and four stolen bases.

=== Major Leagues ===
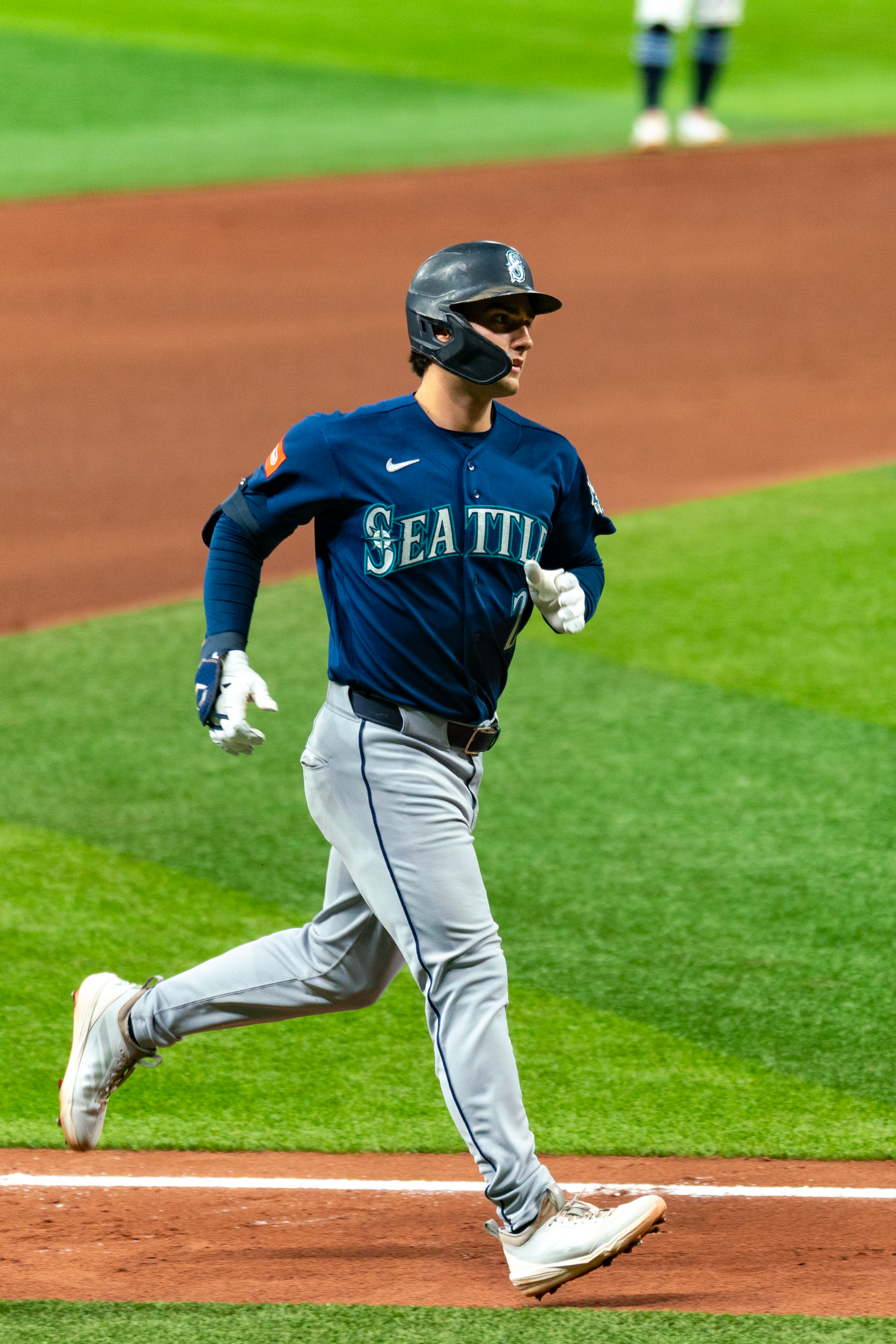
Young celebrating a home run in 2026

==== 2025 ====
On May 30, 2025, Young was selected to the 40-man roster and promoted to the major leagues for the first time. The next day, in his first major league game, Young had the game winning RBI in the bottom of the 11th inning. After struggling in his first week in the majors, Young batted .281/.361/.399 from June 7 to August 15. However, he slumped toward the end of the season, losing the second base job after September 1 to a healthy Jorge Polanco and Leo Rivas, who was just recalled to the majors. Young finished his rookie season batting .211/.302/.305 with four home runs.

==== 2026 ====
Against the Minnesota Twins on August 2, Young had his first career four-hit game.. In 2026, he won the American League Gold Glove Award as a second baseman, becoming the youngest Mariners player to receive the honor since Ken Griffey Jr. at age 22 or younger.
