= Leody Taveras =

Dominican baseball player (born 1998)

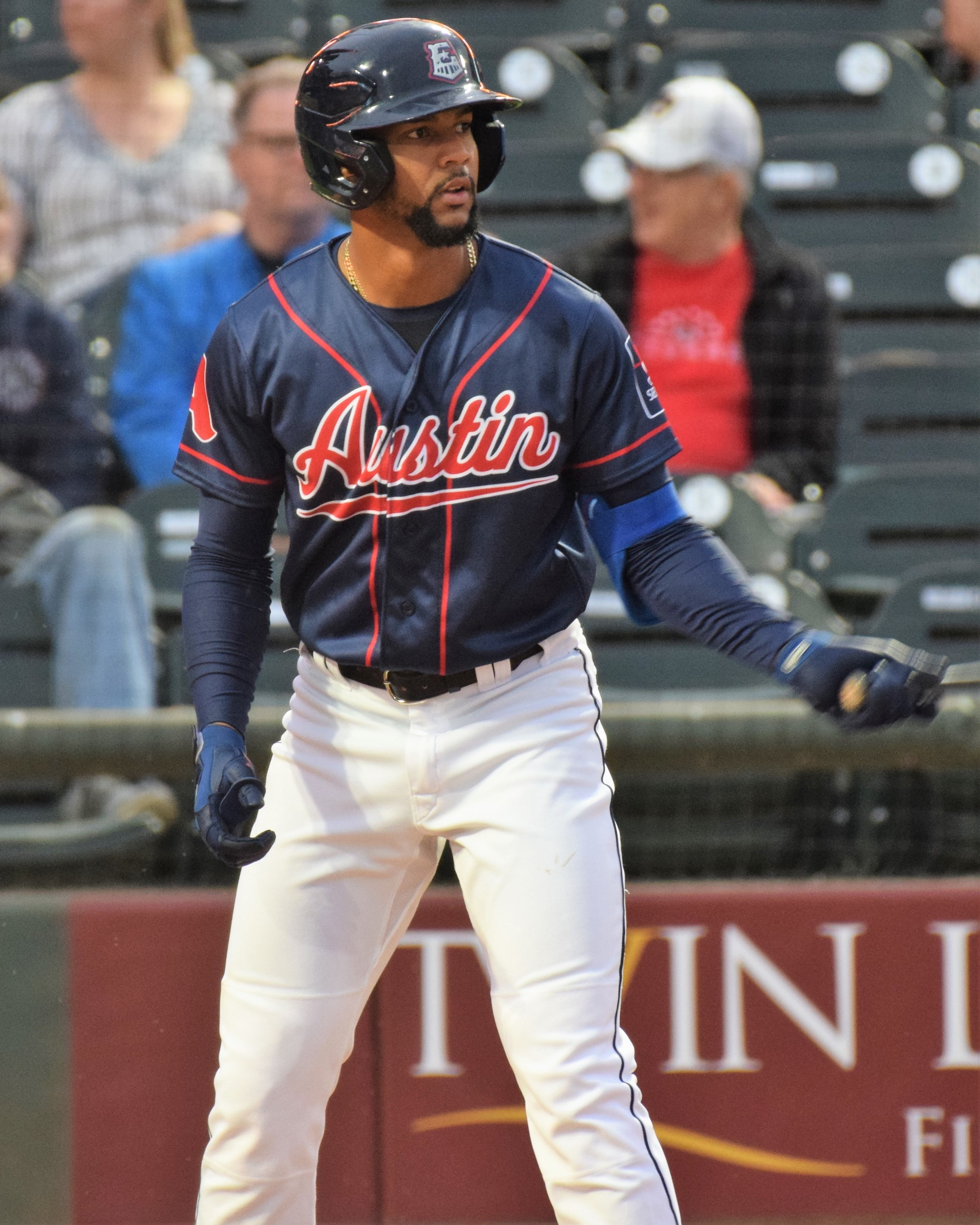
- Taveras with the Round Rock Express in 2022

Free agent
- Outfielder
- Born: September 8, 1998 (age 28); Tenares, Dominican Republic
- Bats: Switch Throws: Right

MLB debut
- July 24, 2020, for the Texas Rangers

MLB statistics (through 2026 season)
- Batting average: .233
- Home runs: 49
- Runs batted in: 233
- Stats at Baseball Reference

Teams
- Texas Rangers (2020–2025); Seattle Mariners (2025); Baltimore Orioles (2026)

Career highlights and awards
- World Series champion (2023)

Leody Taveras Salazar (born September 8, 1998) is a Dominican professional baseball outfielder who is a free agent. He has previously played in Major League Baseball (MLB) for the Texas Rangers, Seattle Mariners, and Baltimore Orioles. The Rangers signed him as an international free agent in 2015, and he made his MLB debut in 2020. He won the 2023 World Series with the Rangers.

== Career ==
=== Texas Rangers ===
==== Minor leagues ====
Taveras signed with the Texas Rangers as an international free agent on July 2, 2015, for a bonus of $2.6 million. He made his professional debut in 2016 with the Dominican Summer League Rangers and was later promoted to the Arizona League Rangers and Spokane Indians that season. In 73 total games between the three teams, he batted .271 with one home run, 33 RBIs and 18 stole bases.

Prior to the 2017 season, Baseball America ranked Taveras as the Rangers' best prospect. He spent 2017 with the Hickory Crawdads, where he posted a .249 batting average with eight home runs, 50 RBIs and 20 stolen bases. Taveras spent the 2018 season with the Down East Wood Ducks of the Class A-Advanced Carolina League, hitting .246/.312/.332/.644 with 5 home runs, 48 RBI, and 19 stolen bases in 132 games. He was selected to the 2018 All-Star Futures Game.

Taveras was ranked as one of the top 100 prospects in baseball before the 2019 season by Baseball Prospectus (#47), ESPN's Keith Law (#62), and FanGraphs (#94). He returned to Down East to open the 2019 season, and hit .294/.368/.376/.745 with 2 home runs and 25 RBI in 66 games for them. On June 20, he was promoted to the Frisco RoughRiders of the Double-A Texas League. With Frisco, Taveras hit .265/.320/.375 with 3 home runs and 31 RBI. The Rangers added Taveras to their 40-man roster following the 2019 season.

==== 2020 ====
Taveras made the Rangers' Opening Day roster in 2020. He made his major league debut on Opening Day, July 24, against the Colorado Rockies. Taveras hit his first career home run on August 29 while playing against the Los Angeles Dodgers. He finished the 2020 season hitting .227/.308/.395 with 4 home runs, 6 RBI, and 8 stolen bases in 33 games.

==== 2021 ====
Taveras split the 2021 season between Texas and the Round Rock Express of the Triple-A West. With Texas, he hit .161/.207/.270 with 3 home runs, 9 RBI, and 10 stolen bases in 49 games. With Round Rock, he hit .245/.343/.475 with 17 home runs, 55 RBI, and 13 stolen bases in 87 games.

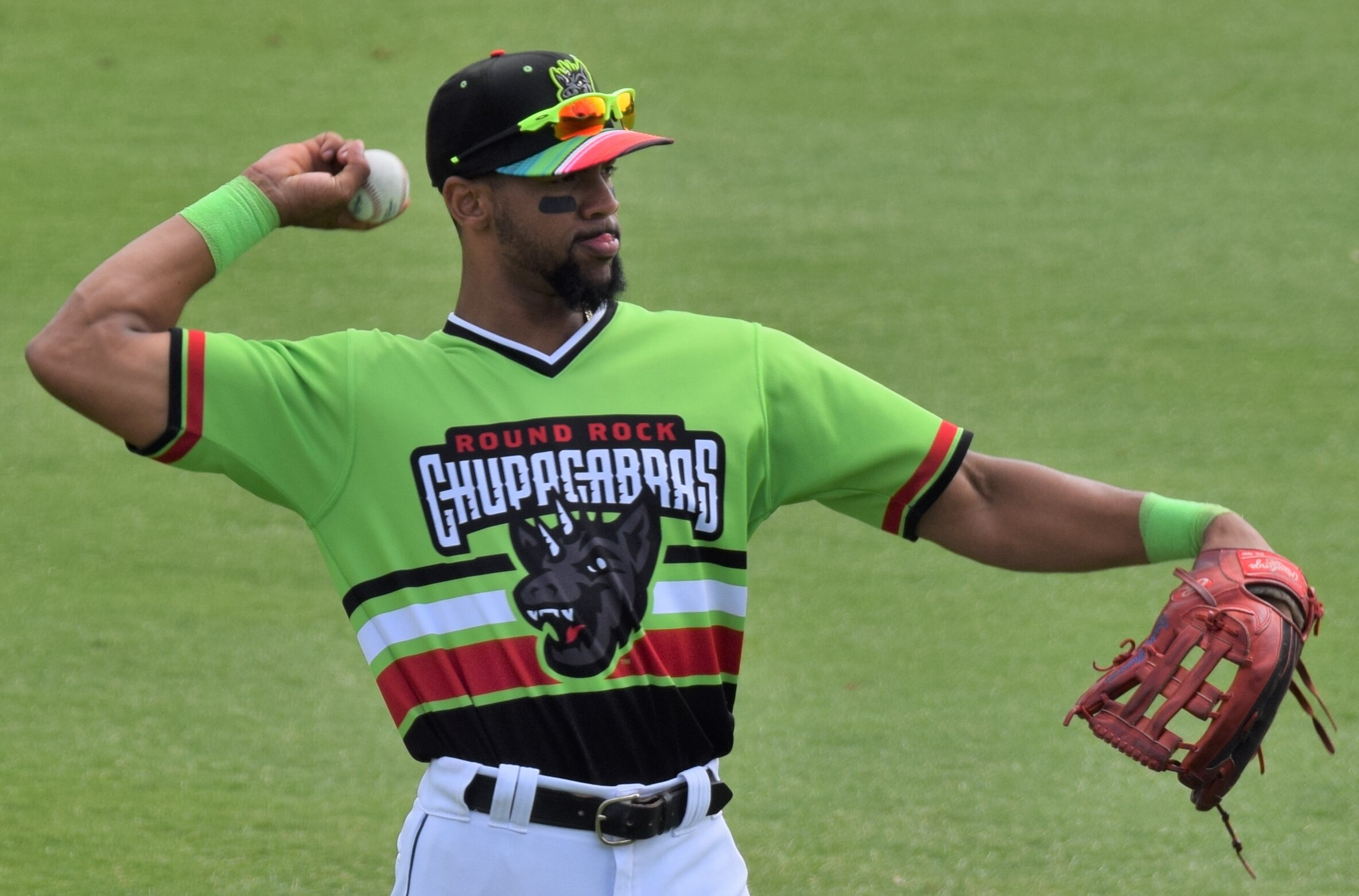
Taveras with Round Rock in 2022

==== 2022 ====
Taveras once again split the season between Texas and Round Rock in 2022, though his major league playing time increased. With Texas, he hit .261/.309/.366/.675 with 5 home runs, 34 RBI, and 11 stolen bases in 99 games. In the minors, he hit .294/.335/.485/.820 with 7 home runs, 29 RBI, and 7 stolen bases in 49 games.

==== 2023 ====
In 2023, Taveras was shut down partway through spring training due to a "low-grade" oblique strain. He began the regular season on the injured list. He was activated for his season debut on April 12. He made 143 appearances for the Rangers over the course of the season, slashing .266/.312/.421 with career-highs in home runs (14), RBI (67), and stolen bases (14). He got a hit the Rangers' first four postseason games, then hit a home run off Justin Verlander of the Houston Astros in Game 1 of the American League Championship Series. He started in center field for the Rangers in their run to the World Series title. However, he went 0-for-16 in the World Series and batted .209 with one home run and 10 walks in 17 postseason games.

==== 2024 ====
Taveras began the 2024 campaign as Texas' Opening Day center fielder. He appeared in 151 games for the Rangers during the season, batting .229/.289/.352 with 12 home runs, 44 RBI, and a career-high 23 stolen bases.

==== 2025 ====
Taveras began the 2025 season in a center field platoon with Kevin Pillar; in 30 games for the Rangers, Taveras slashed .241/.259/.342 with one home run, eight RBI, and six stolen bases. On May 4, Taveras was placed on outright waivers by the Rangers.

=== Seattle Mariners ===
On May 6, 2025, the Seattle Mariners claimed Taveras off waivers. In his first game with the Mariners on May 7, he made his first MLB start in right field, drove in the tying run, and scored the game-winning run. In 28 games for Seattle, Taveras batted .174/.198/.272 with two home runs, nine RBI, and three stolen bases. Taveras was designated for assignment by the Mariners on June 9. He cleared waivers and was sent outright to the Triple-A Tacoma Rainiers on June 13. In 81 games in Tacoma, he batted .280/.356/.446. On October 10, Taveras elected free agency.

=== Baltimore Orioles ===
On November 6, 2025, Taveras signed a one-year, $2 million contract with the Baltimore Orioles. On April 20, 2026, Taveras hit his first career grand slam, off reliever Alex Lange, in the 12th inning of a 7–5 Baltimore win over the Kansas City Royals. On November 2, Taveras was removed from the 40-man roster and sent outright to the Triple–A Norfolk Tides, after which he elected free agency.

== Personal life ==
Taveras and his wife have three children.

Taveras is cousins with outfielder Willy Taveras, who played seven seasons in MLB and Luis Taveras, a minor league catcher who reached Triple-A in 2001 and 2003.
