= List of Seattle Mariners team records =

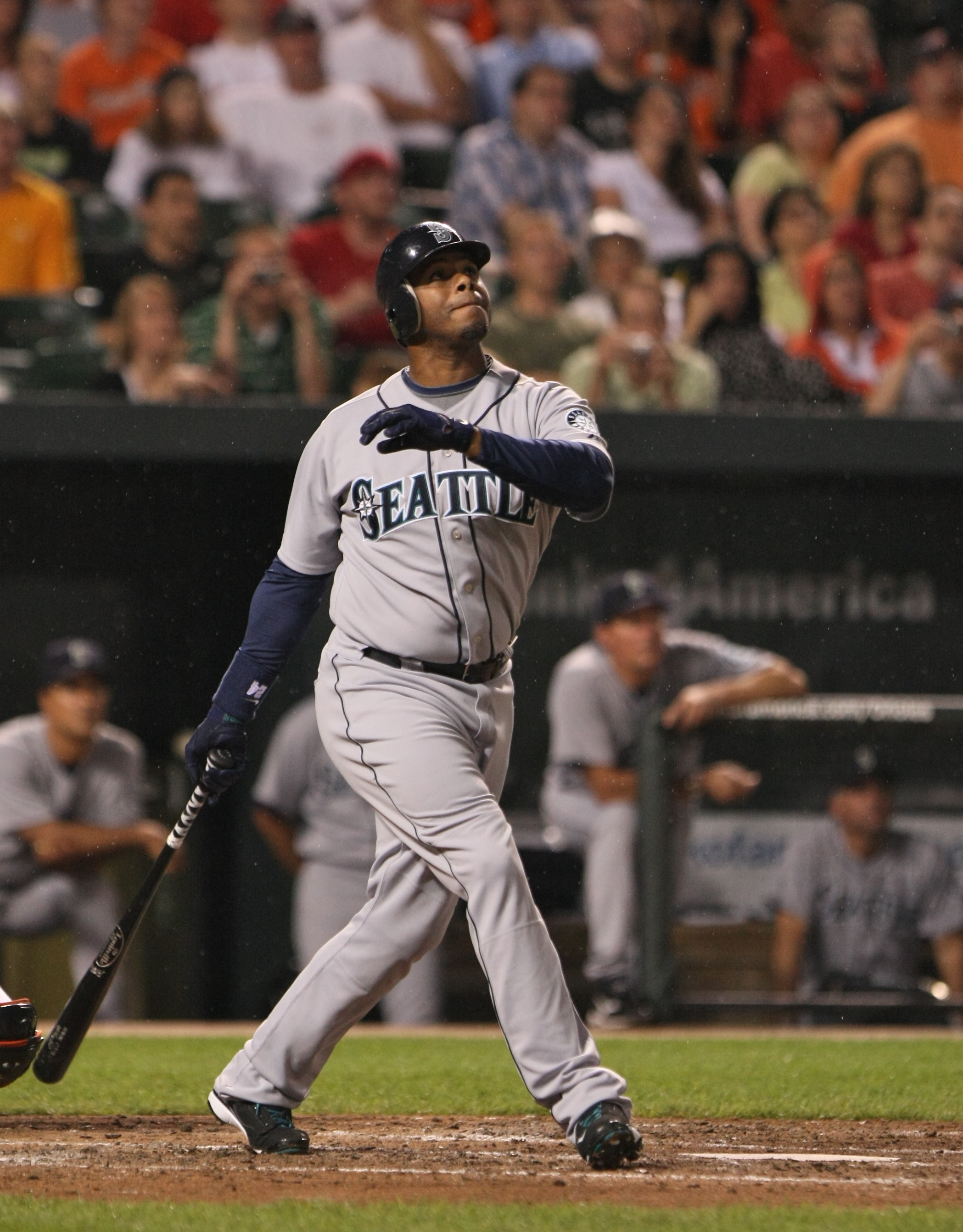
Ken Griffey Jr. playing for the Mariners in June 2009. Griffey Jr. holds five single-season batting records and an individual career record for the Mariners franchise.

The Seattle Mariners are a Major League Baseball (MLB) team who have participated in 49 seasons since their inception in 1977. Through the end of the 2025 season, they have won 3,689 games, lost 4,022, and tied two, for a winning percentage of .478. This list documents the superlative records and accomplishments of team members during their tenures as Mariners in MLB's American League (AL) West.

Ichiro Suzuki holds the most franchise records as of the end of the 2012 season, with ten, including best single-season batting average, most career hits, and most career triples. He is followed by Edgar Martínez, who holds nine records, including best career on-base percentage and the single-season walk record.

Two Seattle players currently hold MLB records. Suzuki holds the record for most single-season hits and singles, obtaining both in 2004. Mike Cameron is tied with 20 others for the most home runs in a game, with four. Additionally, Gene Walter is tied for the AL lead in balks for a single game, which he achieved on July 18, 1988.

== Table key ==
Table key
| RBI | Run(s) batted in |
| ERA | Earned run average |
| OPS | On-base percentage plus slugging percentage |
| * | Tie between two or more players/teams |
| † | American League record |
| § | Major League record |

== Individual career records ==
Batting statistics; pitching statistics

Career batting records
| Statistic | Player | Record | Mariners career | Ref |
|---|---|---|---|---|
| Batting average | Ichiro Suzuki | .321 | 2001–2012, 2018–2019 | |
| On-base percentage | Edgar Martínez | .418 | 1987–2004 | |
| Slugging percentage | Alex Rodriguez | .561 | 1994–2000 | |
| OPS | Alex Rodriguez | .934 | 1994–2000 | |
| Hits | Ichiro Suzuki | 2,542 | 2001–2012, 2018–2019 | |
| Total bases | Edgar Martínez | 3,718 | 1987–2004 | |
| Singles | Ichiro Suzuki | 2,069 | 2001–2012, 2018–2019 | |
| Doubles | Edgar Martínez | 514 | 1987–2004 | |
| Triples | Ichiro Suzuki | 79 | 2001–2012, 2018–2019 | |
| Home runs | Ken Griffey Jr. | 417 | 1989–1999; 2009–2010 | |
| RBI | Edgar Martínez | 1,261 | 1987–2004 | |
| Walks | Edgar Martínez | 1,283 | 1987–2004 | |
| Strikeouts | Jay Buhner | 1,375 | 1988–2001 | |
| Stolen bases | Ichiro Suzuki | 438 | 2001–2012, 2018–2019 | |

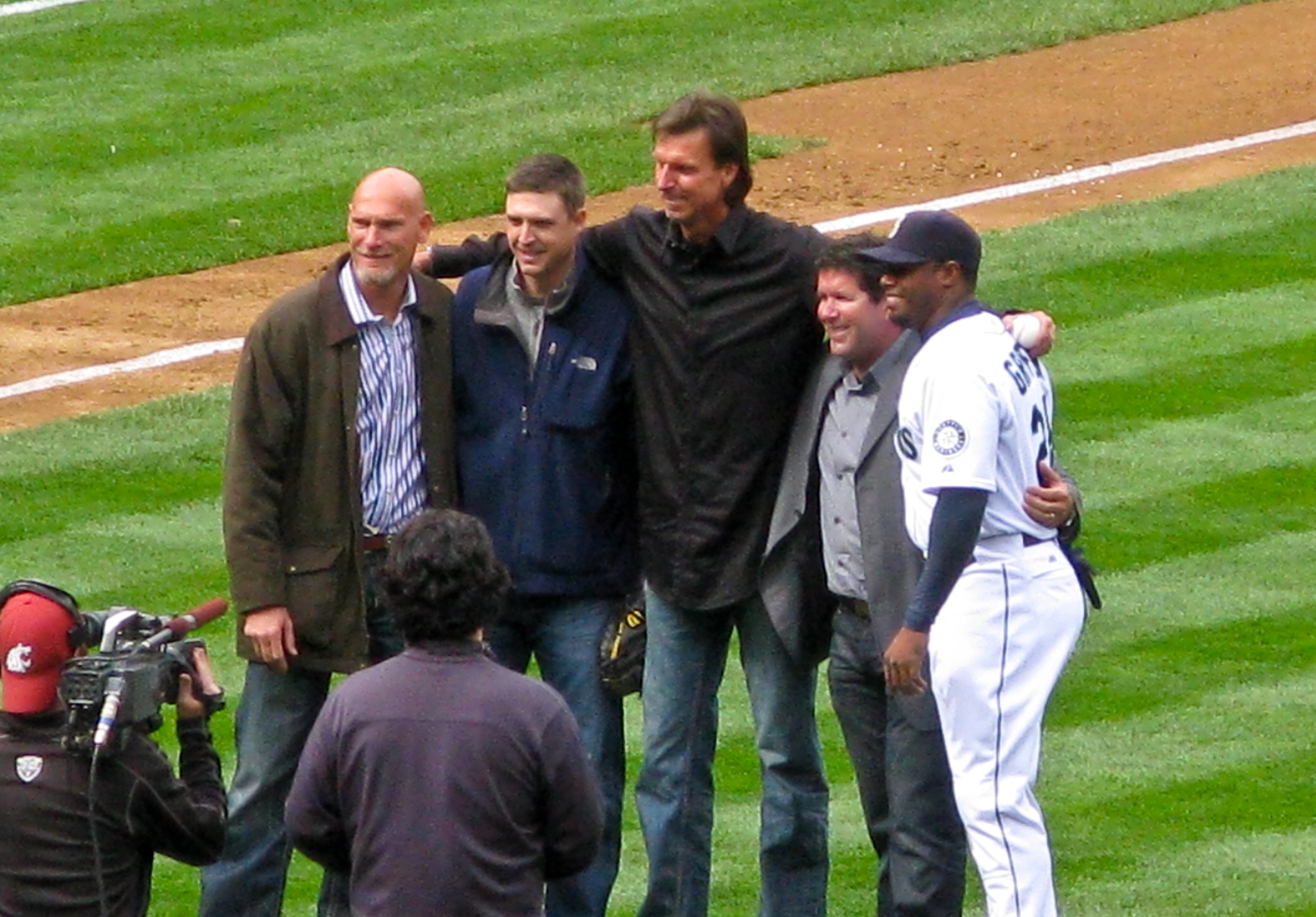
Randy Johnson (middle), holds two career pitching records for the Mariners.

Career pitching records
| Statistic | Player | Record | Mariners career | Ref |
|---|---|---|---|---|
| Wins | Félix Hernández | 169 | 2005–2019 | |
| Losses | Félix Hernández | 136 | 2005–2019 | |
| Win–loss percentage | Paul Abbott | .679 | 1998–2002 | |
| ERA | Félix Hernández | 3.42* | 2005–2019 | |
| Saves | Kazuhiro Sasaki | 129 | 2000–2003 | |
| Strikeouts | Félix Hernández | 2,439 | 2005–2019 | |
| Shutouts | Randy Johnson | 19 | 1989–1998 | |
| Games | Jeff Nelson | 432 | 1992–1995; 2001–2003; 2005 | |
| Innings | Félix Hernández | 2,729 2/3 | 2005–2019 | |
| Games started | Félix Hernández | 418 | 2005–2019 | |
| Complete games | Mike Moore | 56 | 1982–1988 | |
| Walks | Randy Johnson | 884 | 1989–1998 | |
| Hits allowed | Félix Hernández | 2,487 | 2005–2019 | |
| Wild pitches | Félix Hernández | 156 | 2005–2019 | |
| Hit batsmen | Félix Hernández | 105 | 2005–2019 | |

== Individual single-season records ==
Batting statistics; pitching statistics;

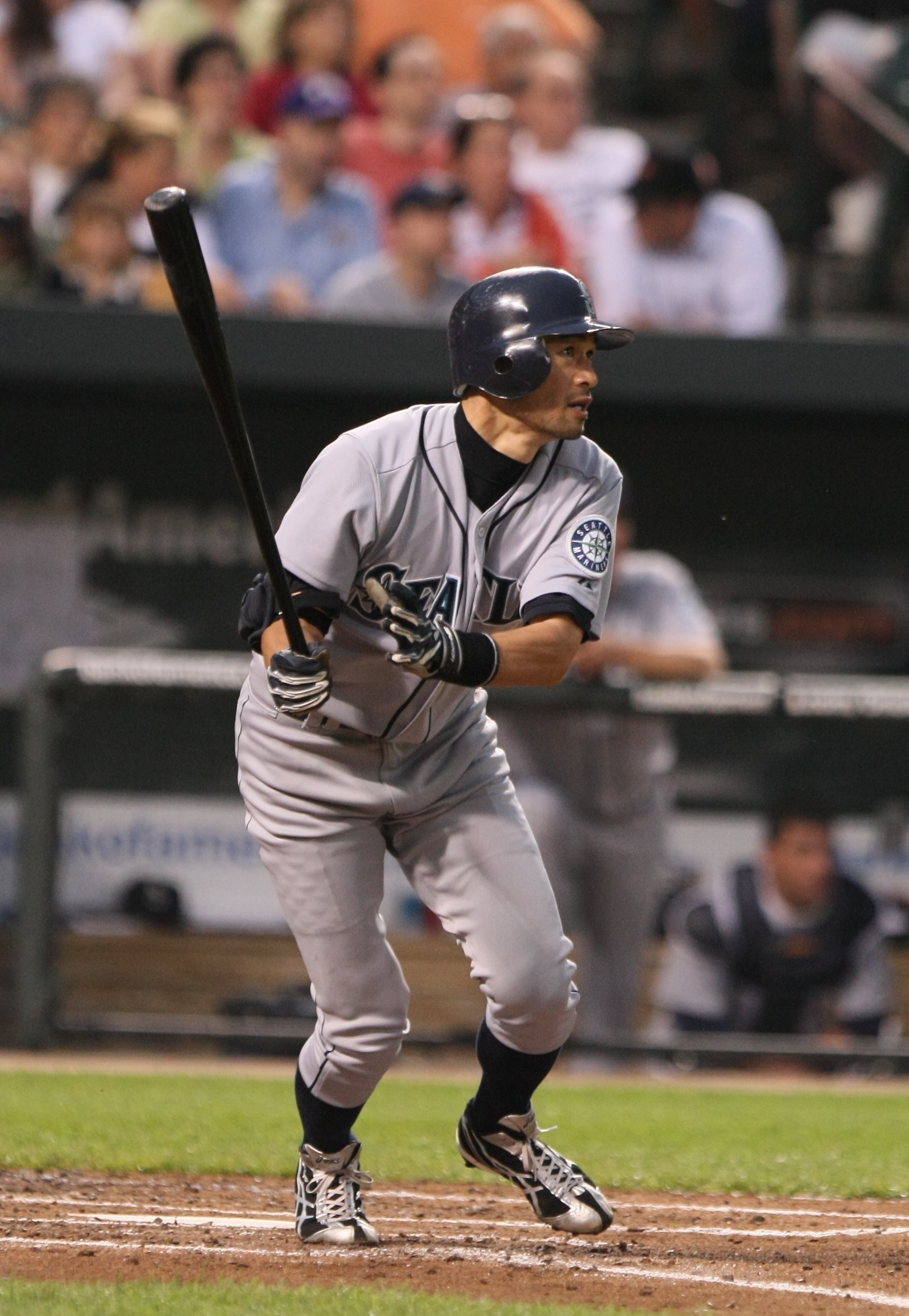
Ichiro Suzuki, the holder of five single-season batting records for the Mariners

Single-season batting records
| Statistic | Player | Record | Season | Ref(s) |
|---|---|---|---|---|
| Batting average | Ichiro Suzuki | .372 | 2004 | |
| Home runs | Cal Raleigh | 60 | 2025 | |
| RBI | Ken Griffey Jr. | 147 | 1997 | |
| Runs | Alex Rodriguez | 141 | 1996 | |
| Hits | Ichiro Suzuki | 262^{§} | 2004 | |
| Singles | Ichiro Suzuki | 225^{§} | 2004 | |
| Doubles | Alex Rodriguez | 54 | 1996 | |
| Triples | Ichiro Suzuki | 12 | 2005 | |
| Stolen bases | Harold Reynolds | 60 | 1987 | |
| At bats | Ichiro Suzuki | 704 | 2004 | |
| Slugging percentage | Ken Griffey Jr. | .674 | 1994 | |
| Extra-base hits | Ken Griffey Jr. | 93 | 1997 | |
| Total bases | Ken Griffey Jr. | 393 | 1997 | |
| On-base percentage | Edgar Martínez | .479 | 1995 | |
| OPS | Edgar Martínez | 1.107 | 1995 | |
| Walks | Edgar Martínez | 123 | 1996 | |
| Strikeouts | Eugenio Suárez | 196 | 2022 | |

Single-season pitching records
| Statistic | Player | Record | Season | Ref |
|---|---|---|---|---|
| Wins | Jamie Moyer | 21 | 2003 | |
| Losses | Matt Young | 19* | 1985 | |
| Losses | Mike Moore | 19* | 1987 | |
| Strikeouts | Randy Johnson | 308 | 1993 | |
| ERA | Félix Hernández | 2.14 | 2014 | |
| Earned runs allowed | Mark Langston | 129 | 1986 | |
| Hits allowed | Mike Moore | 279 | 1986 | |
| Walks | Randy Johnson | 152 | 1991 | |
| Shutouts | Félix Hernández | 5 | 2012 | |
| Saves | Edwin Díaz | 57 | 2018 | |
| Games | Ed Vande Berg | 78 | 1982 | |
| Starts | Mike Moore | 37 | 1986 | |
| Complete games | Mike Moore | 14* | 1985 | |
| Complete games | Mark Langston | 14* | 1987 | |
| Innings | Mark Langston | 272.0 | 1987 | |

== Individual single-game records ==
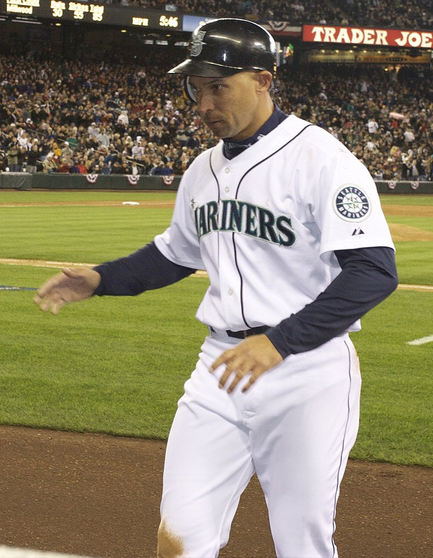
Raúl Ibañez, the Mariners' record holder for most hits in a game

Single-game batting records
| Statistic | Player | Record | Date |
|---|---|---|---|
| Hits | Raúl Ibañez | 6 | September 22, 2004 |
| At bats | Joey Cora | 7 | June 11, 1996 |
| RBI | Alvin Davis | 8* | May 9, 1986 |
| RBI | Mike Blowers | 8* | May 24, 1995 |
| RBI | Mike Cameron | 8* | August 19, 2001 |
| Home runs | Mike Cameron | 4^{§}^{[a]} | May 2, 2002 |
| Runs | Ken Griffey Jr. | 5* | May 24, 1996 |
| Runs | Edgar Martínez | 5* | May 17, 1999 |
| Runs | Alex Rodriguez | 5* | April 16, 2000 |
| Strikeouts | Miguel Olivo | 5 | July 29, 2004 |

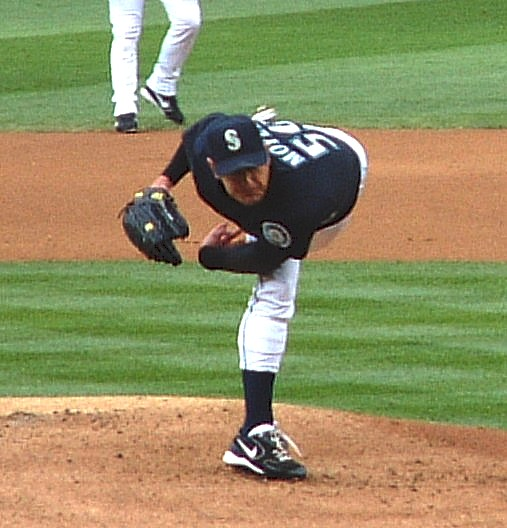
Jamie Moyer, the Mariners record holder for runs and home runs allowed in a single game

Single-game pitching records
| Statistic | Player | Record | Date |
|---|---|---|---|
| Hits allowed | Greg Hibbard | 15 | May 24, 1994 |
| Runs allowed | Jamie Moyer | 12 | August 9, 2000 |
| Runs allowed (team) | Félix Hernández, bullpen | 22 | August 15, 2015 |
| Walks allowed | Rick Jones | 11 | June 18, 1977 |
| Home runs allowed | Mark Langston | 5* | April 18, 1988 |
| Home runs allowed | Jamie Moyer | 5* | July 21, 2006 |
| Balks | Gene Walter | 4^{†}^{[b]} | July 18, 1988 |
| Innings pitched | Mike Moore | 11 | August 14, 1985 |
| Strikeouts | Randy Johnson | 19* | June 24, 1997 |
| Strikeouts | Randy Johnson | 19* | August 8, 1997 |

== Team season records ==
Team season batting records
| Statistic | Record | Season |
|---|---|---|
| Home runs | 264 | 1997 |
| Runs | 993 | 1996 |
| Hits | 1,637 | 2001 |
| Batting average | .288 | 2001 |
| Walks | 775 | 2000 |
| Intentional walks | 73 | 1993 |
| Most runners left on base | 1,257 | 2001 |
| Strikeouts | 1,259 | 2012 |
| Stolen bases | 174* | 1987, 2001 |

Team season pitching records
| Statistic | Record | Season |
|---|---|---|
| Hits allowed | 1,613 | 1999 |
| Runs allowed | 834 | 1999 |
| Home runs allowed | 216 | 1996 |
| Strikeouts | 1,207 | 1997 |
| Shutouts | 14 | 2001 |

== Team all-time records ==
Source: Baseball-Reference.com
Statistics current through 5/5/23.

Team all-time records
| Statistic | Record |
|---|---|
| Home runs | 7,305 |
| Runs | 32,218 |
| Hits | 63,915 |
| Batting average | .258 |
| ERA | 4.32 |
| Runs allowed | 34,036 |

== See also ==
- Baseball statistics
- Seattle Mariners award winners and league leaders

== Notes ==
- ^{a} Cameron is one of 21 players in MLB history to hit 4 home runs in one game.
- ^{b} Tied with John Dopson, Rick Honeycutt, Vic Raschi, and Bobby Witt
