= Seattle Mariners award winners and league leaders =

Baseball team leaders

The following is a list of Seattle Mariners professional baseball players and managers who have won various awards or other accolades from Major League Baseball or other organizations or have led the American League in some statistical category at the end of the season.

== Awards ==
=== American League MVP ===
- Ken Griffey Jr. (1997)
- Ichiro Suzuki (2001)

=== American League Cy Young ===
- Randy Johnson (1995)
- Félix Hernández (2010)

=== American League Rookie of the Year ===
- Alvin Davis (1984)
- Kazuhiro Sasaki (2000)
- Ichiro Suzuki (2001)
- Kyle Lewis (2020)
- Julio Rodríguez (2022)

=== American League Reliever of the Year ===
- JJ Putz (2007)
- Edwin Díaz (2018)

=== American League Manager of the Year ===
- Lou Piniella (1995, 2001)

=== American League Gold Glove Award ===
Each player indicated with position at which he won the award.

- 1987: Mark Langston (P)
- 1988: Harold Reynolds (2B), Mark Langston (P)
- 1989: Harold Reynolds (2B)
- 1990: Harold Reynolds (2B), Ken Griffey Jr. (OF)
- 1991: Ken Griffey Jr. (OF)
- 1992: Ken Griffey Jr. (OF)
- 1993: Omar Vizquel (SS), Ken Griffey Jr. (OF)
- 1994: Ken Griffey Jr. (OF)
- 1995: Ken Griffey Jr. (OF)
- 1996: Jay Buhner (OF), Ken Griffey Jr. (OF)
- 1997: Ken Griffey Jr. (OF)
- 1998: Ken Griffey Jr. (OF)
- 1999: Ken Griffey Jr. (OF)
- 2000: John Olerud (1B)
- 2001: Mike Cameron (OF), Ichiro Suzuki (OF)
- 2002: John Olerud (1B), Bret Boone (2B), Ichiro Suzuki (OF)
- 2003: John Olerud (1B), Bret Boone (2B), Ichiro Suzuki (OF), Mike Cameron (OF)
- 2004: Bret Boone (2B), Ichiro Suzuki (OF)
- 2005: Ichiro Suzuki (OF)
- 2006: Ichiro Suzuki (OF)
- 2007: Adrián Beltré (3B), Ichiro Suzuki (OF)
- 2008: Adrián Beltré (3B), Ichiro Suzuki (OF)
- 2009: Ichiro Suzuki (OF)
- 2010: Ichiro Suzuki (OF), Franklin Gutiérrez (OF)
- 2014: Kyle Seager (3B)
- 2020: Evan White (1B), J. P. Crawford (SS)
- 2024: Cal Raleigh (C), Dylan Moore (UT)
- 2026: Cole Young (2B)

=== Wilson Defensive Player of the Year Award (2012–2019) ===
See explanatory note at Atlanta Braves award winners and league leaders.

- 2012 Brendan Ryan (SS)
- 2013 Dustin Ackley (2B)
- 2018 Mike Zunino (C)

=== American League Silver Slugger Award ===
Each player indicated with position at which he won the award.

- 1991: Ken Griffey Jr. (OF)
- 1992: Edgar Martínez (3B)
- 1993: Ken Griffey Jr. (OF)
- 1994: Ken Griffey Jr. (OF)
- 1995: Edgar Martínez (DH)
- 1996: Alex Rodriguez (SS), Ken Griffey Jr. (OF)
- 1997: Ken Griffey Jr. (OF), Edgar Martínez (DH)
- 1998: Alex Rodriguez (SS), Ken Griffey Jr. (OF)
- 1999: Alex Rodriguez (SS), Ken Griffey Jr. (OF)
- 2000: Alex Rodriguez (SS)
- 2001: Bret Boone (2B), Ichiro Suzuki (OF), Edgar Martínez (DH)
- 2003: Bret Boone (2B), Edgar Martínez (DH)
- 2007: Ichiro Suzuki (OF)
- 2009: Ichiro Suzuki (OF)
- 2017: Nelson Cruz (DH)
- 2022: Julio Rodríguez (OF)
- 2025: Cal Raleigh (C)
- 2026: Randy Arozarena (OF)

=== All-MLB Team ===
==== First team ====
- 2025: Cal Raleigh (C), Julio Rodríguez (OF)

==== Second team ====
- 2022: Julio Rodríguez (OF)
- 2025: Bryan Woo (SP), Andrés Muñoz (RP)
- 2026: Randy Arozarena (OF)

=== Edgar Martínez Award ===
Note: Originally known as the Outstanding Designated Hitter Award, the award was named after longtime Mariners designated hitter Edgar Martínez, who won the award five times, in 2004.

- 1979: Willie Horton
- 1995: Edgar Martínez
- 1997: Edgar Martínez
- 1998: Edgar Martínez
- 2000: Edgar Martínez
- 2001: Edgar Martínez
- 2017: Nelson Cruz

=== Roberto Clemente Award ===
- Harold Reynolds (1991)
- Jamie Moyer (2003)
- Edgar Martínez (2004)

=== MLB "This Year in Baseball Awards" ===
See: This Year in Baseball Awards#Award winners
Note: Voted by fans as the best in all of Major League Baseball (i.e., not two awards, one for each league).

==== "This Year in Baseball Awards" Dependable Player of the Year ====
- Ichiro Suzuki (2010)

=== All-Star Game MVP ===
- Ken Griffey Jr. (1992)
- Ichiro Suzuki (2007)
- Robinson Canó (2017)

=== All-Stars ===
- 1977 - Ruppert Jones
- 1978 - Craig Reynolds
- 1979 - Bruce Bochte
- 1980 - Rick Honeycutt
- 1981 - Tom Paciorek
- 1982 - Floyd Bannister
- 1983 - Matt Young
- 1984 - Alvin Davis
- 1985 - Phil Bradley
- 1986 - Jim Presley
- 1987 - Mark Langston and Harold Reynolds
- 1988 - Harold Reynolds
- 1989 - Jeffrey Leonard
- 1990 - Ken Griffey Jr. and Randy Johnson
- 1991 - Ken Griffey Jr.
- 1992 - Ken Griffey Jr. and Edgar Martínez
- 1993 - Ken Griffey Jr. and Randy Johnson
- 1994 - Ken Griffey Jr. and Randy Johnson
- 1995 - Ken Griffey Jr., Randy Johnson, Edgar Martínez, and Tino Martinez
- 1996 - Jay Buhner, Ken Griffey Jr., Edgar Martínez, Alex Rodriguez, and Dan Wilson
- 1997 - Joey Cora, Ken Griffey Jr., Randy Johnson, Edgar Martínez, and Alex Rodríguez
- 1998 - Ken Griffey Jr. and Alex Rodríguez
- 1999 - Ken Griffey Jr.
- 2000 - Edgar Martínez, Alex Rodríguez and Aaron Sele
- 2001 - Bret Boone, Mike Cameron, Freddy García, Edgar Martínez, Jeff Nelson, John Olerud, Kazuhiro Sasaki, and Ichiro Suzuki
- 2002 - Freddy García, Kazuhiro Sasaki and Ichiro Suzuki
- 2003 - Bret Boone, Shigetoshi Hasegawa, Edgar Martínez, Jamie Moyer, and Ichiro Suzuki
- 2004 - Ichiro Suzuki
- 2005 - Ichiro Suzuki
- 2006 - Jose Lopez and Ichiro Suzuki
- 2007 - J. J. Putz and Ichiro Suzuki
- 2008 - Ichiro Suzuki
- 2009 - Félix Hernández and Ichiro Suzuki
- 2010 - Ichiro Suzuki
- 2011 - Félix Hernández, Brandon League, and Michael Pineda
- 2012 - Félix Hernández
- 2013 - Félix Hernández and Hisashi Iwakuma
- 2014 - Robinson Canó, Félix Hernández, Fernando Rodney, and Kyle Seager
- 2015 - Nelson Cruz, Félix Hernández
- 2016 - Robinson Canó
- 2017 - Robinson Canó, Nelson Cruz
- 2018 - Nelson Cruz, Jean Segura, Mitch Haniger, and Edwin Díaz
- 2019 - Daniel Vogelbach
- 2021 - Yusei Kikuchi
- 2022 - Julio Rodríguez, Ty France
- 2023 - Luis Castillo, George Kirby, Julio Rodríguez
- 2024 - Logan Gilbert, Andrés Muñoz
- 2025 - Cal Raleigh, Randy Arozarena, Julio Rodríguez, Andrés Muñoz, Bryan Woo

=== MLB All-Century Team (1999) ===
- Ken Griffey Jr.

=== Players Choice Awards Player of the Decade (1999) ===
- Ken Griffey Jr. (1999)

=== Sporting News MLB Player of the Year ===
- Alex Rodriguez (1996)
- Ken Griffey Jr. (1997)
- Cal Raleigh (2025)

=== Sporting News AL Pitcher of the Year ===
- Randy Johnson (1995)
- Félix Hernández (2010, 2014)
- Edwin Díaz (2018, reliever)

=== Baseball Prospectus Internet Baseball Awards AL Cy Young ===
See: Baseball Prospectus Internet Baseball Awards

- Freddy García (2001)
- Félix Hernández (2010)

=== Baseball Prospectus Internet Baseball Awards AL Rookie of the Year ===
See: Baseball Prospectus Internet Baseball Awards

- Ichiro Suzuki (2001)
- Michael Pineda (2011)

=== Baseball America All-Rookie Team ===
See: Baseball America#Baseball America All-Rookie Team

- 2011 – Dustin Ackley (2B), Mike Carp (OF; one of three), and Michael Pineda (SP; one of five)

=== Topps All-Star Rookie teams ===
- Ruppert Jones OF (1977)
- Ed Vande Berg LHP (1982)
- Matt Young LHP (1983)
- Alvin Davis 1B and Mark Langston LHP (1984)
- Jay Buhner OF (1985)
- Danny Tartabull OF (1986)
- Greg Briley OF and Ken Griffey Jr. (1989)
- Dave Fleming LHP (1992)
- John Halama LHP (1999)
- Kazuhiro Sasaki RHP (2000)
- Ichiro Suzuki OF (2001)
- Roenis Elías LHP (2014)

=== Hutch Award ===
- Jamie Moyer (2003)
- Raúl Ibañez (2013)
- Dee Strange-Gordon (2019)

=== Lou Gehrig Memorial Award ===
- Jamie Moyer (2003)

== Other achievements ==
=== National Baseball Hall of Fame ===
See: Seattle Mariners § Baseball Hall of Famers.

=== Seattle Mariners Hall of Fame ===
See: Seattle Mariners § Seattle Mariners Hall of Fame

=== Retired numbers ===
See: Seattle Mariners § Retired numbers.

=== Ford C. Frick Award (broadcasters) ===
See: Seattle Mariners § Ford C. Frick Award recipients

=== World Baseball Classic All-WBC Team ===
- 2013 – Michael Saunders (OF) (2013 World Baseball Classic § All-WBC team)

=== Best Male Athlete ESPY Award ===
- Ken Griffey Jr. (1998; with Tiger Woods)

== American League statistical batting leaders ==
=== Batting average ===
- Edgar Martínez (.343, 1992)
- Edgar Martínez (.356, 1995)
- Alex Rodriguez (.358, 1996)
- Ichiro Suzuki (.350, 2001)
- Ichiro Suzuki (.372, 2004) Team Record

=== On-base % ===
- Edgar Martínez (.479, 1995) Team Record
- Edgar Martínez (.464, 1996)
- Edgar Martínez (.456, 1997)

=== Slugging percentage ===
- Ken Griffey Jr. (.646, 1997)

=== OPS ===
- Edgar Martínez (1.107, 1995) Team Record

=== Games ===
- Willie Horton (162, 1979) co-leader
- Ruppert Jones (162, 1979) co-leader
- Raúl Ibañez (162, 2005 & 2008) co-leader
- Ichiro Suzuki (162, 2005 & 2008 & 2010) co-leader

=== At bats ===
- Harold Reynolds (642, 1990)
- Alex Rodriguez (686, 1998)
- Ichiro Suzuki (692, 2001)
- Ichiro Suzuki (704, 2004) Team Record
- Ichiro Suzuki (679, 2005)
- Ichiro Suzuki (695, 2006)
- Julio Rodríguez (652, 2025)

=== Runs ===
- Edgar Martínez (121, 1995)
- Alex Rodriguez (141, 1996) Team Record
- Ken Griffey Jr. (125, 1997)

=== Hits ===
- Alex Rodriguez (213, 1998)
- Ichiro Suzuki (242, 2001)
- Ichiro Suzuki (262, 2004) Major League Record
- Ichiro Suzuki (224, 2006)
- Ichiro Suzuki (238, 2007)
- Ichiro Suzuki (213, 2008)
- Ichiro Suzuki (225, 2009)
- Ichiro Suzuki (214, 2010)

=== Total bases ===
- Ken Griffey Jr. (359, 1993)
- Alex Rodriguez (379, 1996)
- Ken Griffey Jr. (393, 1997) Team Record

=== Singles ===
- Ichiro Suzuki (192, 2001)
- Ichiro Suzuki (165, 2002)
- Ichiro Suzuki (162, 2003)
- Ichiro Suzuki (225, 2004) Major League Record
- Ichiro Suzuki (158, 2005)
- Ichiro Suzuki (186, 2006)
- Ichiro Suzuki (179, 2009)

=== Doubles ===
- Edgar Martínez (46, 1992)
- Edgar Martínez (52, 1995)
- Alex Rodriguez (54, 1996) Team Record

=== Triples ===
- Harold Reynolds (11, 1988)

=== Home runs ===
- Ken Griffey Jr. (40, 1994)
- Ken Griffey Jr. (56, 1997)
- Ken Griffey Jr. (56, 1998)
- Ken Griffey Jr. (48, 1999)
- Cal Raleigh (60, 2025) Team Record

=== RBI ===
- Ken Griffey Jr. (147, 1997) Team Record
- Edgar Martínez (145, 2000)
- Bret Boone (141, 2001)
- Cal Raleigh (125, 2025)

=== Strikeouts ===
- Jay Buhner (159, 1996)
- Jay Buhner (175, 1997)
- Mike Cameron (176, 2002)
- Richie Sexson (167, 2005)
- Eugenio Suárez (196, 2022)
- Eugenio Suárez (214, 2023) Team Record

=== Stolen bases ===
- Harold Reynolds (60, 1987) Team Record
- Julio Cruz (59, 1978)
- Ichiro Suzuki (56, 2001)

=== Runs created ===
- Edgar Martínez (153, 1995)
- Alex Rodriguez (157, 1996) Team Record
- Ken Griffey Jr. (150, 1997)

=== Extra-base hits ===
- Ken Griffey Jr. (86, 1993)
- Ken Griffey Jr. (93, 1997) Team Record

=== Times on base ===
- Edgar Martínez (306, 1995)
- Edgar Martínez (309, 1997)
- Edgar Martínez (288, 1998)
- Ichiro Suzuki (315, 2004) Team Record

=== Hit by pitch ===
- Dave Valle (17, 1993)
- Mike Zunino (17, 2014)
- Ty France (27, 2021), co-leader
- Ty France (34, 2023) Team Record

=== Sacrifices ===
- José López (12, 2006)
- Chone Figgins (17, 2010)

=== Sacrifice flies ===
- Alvin Davis (10, 1991) co-leader
- John Olerud (12, 2002)

=== Intentional walks ===
- Ken Griffey Jr. (23, 1997)
- Ken Griffey Jr. (17, 1999) co-leader
- Ichiro Suzuki (27, 2002) Team Record
- Ichiro Suzuki (19, 2004)
- Ichiro Suzuki (15, 2009)

=== Grounded into double plays ===
- Bruce Bochte (27, 1979)
- John Olerud (21, 2001)

=== At bats per strikeout ===
- Ichiro Suzuki (13.1, 2001)

=== At bats per home run ===
- Ken Griffey Jr. (10.9, 1997)
- Ken Griffey Jr. (11.3, 1998)

=== Outs ===
- Harold Reynolds (516, 1990) Team Record (tied)
- Harold Reynolds (510, 1991)
- Alex Rodríguez (505, 1998)
- Ichiro Suzuki (516, 2011) Team Record (tied)
- Julio Rodríguez (500, 2023)

== American League Statistical Pitching Leaders ==
=== ERA ===
- Randy Johnson (2.48, 1995)
- Freddy García (3.05, 2001)
- Félix Hernández (2.27, 2010)
- Félix Hernández (2.14, 2014) Team Record

=== Wins ===
- Félix Hernández (19, 2009) co-leader

=== Win–loss percentage ===
- Randy Johnson (.900, 1995) Team Record
- Randy Johnson (.833, 1997)
- Félix Hernández (.792, 2009)

=== WHIP ===
- Randy Johnson (1.045, 1995)
- Félix Hernández (1.057, 2010)
- Félix Hernández (0.915, 2014) Team Record

=== Hits allowed/9 innings pitched ===
- Randy Johnson (6.59, 1992)
- Randy Johnson (6.52, 1993)
- Randy Johnson (6.68, 1995)
- Randy Johnson (6.21, 1997) Team Record
- Félix Hernández (7.542, 2009)
- Félix Hernández (6.483, 2014)

=== Strikeouts/9 innings pitched ===
- Mark Langston (8.16, 1984)
- Mark Langston (9.21, 1986)
- Mark Langston (8.67, 1987)
- Randy Johnson (10.31, 1992)
- Randy Johnson (10.86, 1993)
- Randy Johnson (10.67, 1994)
- Randy Johnson (12.35, 1995) Team Record
- Randy Johnson (12.30, 1997)

=== Games ===
- Ed Vande Berg (78, 1982) Team Record (tied)
- Matt Brash (78, 2023) Team Record (tied)

=== Innings pitched ===
- Freddy García (238 2/3, 2001)
- Félix Hernández (249 2/3, 2010)
- Logan Gilbert (208 2/3, 2024)

=== Strikeouts ===
- Floyd Bannister (209, 1982)
- Mark Langston (204, 1984)
- Mark Langston (245, 1986)
- Mark Langston (262, 1987)
- Randy Johnson (241, 1992)
- Randy Johnson (308, 1993) Team Record
- Randy Johnson (204, 1994)
- Randy Johnson (294, 1995)

=== Games started ===
- Mike Moore (37, 1986) co-leader Team Record
- Jeff Fassero (35, 1997) co-leader

=== Complete games ===
- Randy Johnson (9, 1994)
- Cliff Lee (7, 2010) co-leader
- James Paxton (2, 2018) co-leader

=== Shutouts ===
- Randy Johnson (4, 1994)
- Joel Piñeiro (2, 2003) co-leader
- Jeff Weaver (2, 2007) co-leader
- Félix Hernández (5, 2012) Team Record
- Félix Hernández, Mike Montgomery (2, 2015) co-leader
- James Paxton (1, 2018) co-leader

=== Home runs allowed ===
- Rich DeLucia (31, 1991)
- Ryan Franklin (34, 2003) co-leader
- Jamie Moyer (44, 2004) Team Record

=== Walks allowed ===
- Mark Langston (118, 1984)
- Randy Johnson (120, 1990)
- Randy Johnson (152, 1991) Team Record
- Randy Johnson (144, 1992)

=== Hits allowed ===
- Mike Moore (279, 1986) Team Record
- Mike Moore (268, 1987)

=== Strikeout to walk ratio ===
- Randy Johnson (4.52, 1995)
- Marco Gonzalez (9.14, 2020) Team Record
- George Kirby (9.05, 2023)
- George Kirby (7.78, 2024)

=== Losses ===
- Matt Young (19, 1985) Team Record (tied)
- Mike Morgan (17, 1986)
- Mike Moore (19, 1987) Team Record (tied)
- Erik Hanson (17, 1992)
- Marco Gonzalez (15, 2022)

=== Earned runs allowed ===
- Mark Langston (129, 1986) Team Record
- Mike Moore (121, 1987)

=== Wild pitches ===
- Gaylord Perry (13, 1982)
- Félix Hernández (17, 2009) co-leader
- James Paxton (15, 2017) co-leader

=== Hit batsmen ===
- Randy Johnson (18, 1992) Team Record
- Randy Johnson (16, 1993)

=== Batters faced ===
- Mike Moore (1,145, 1986) Team Record

== American League Age Statistical Leaders ==
=== Oldest player ===
- Gaylord Perry (43, 1982)
- Gaylord Perry (44, 1983)
- Goose Gossage (42, 1994)
- Dennis Martínez (42, 1997)
- Jamie Moyer (42, 2005)
- Jamie Moyer (43, 2006)
- Ichiro Suzuki (45, 2019) Team Record

=== Youngest player ===
- Edwin Núñez (19, 1982)
- Edwin Núñez (20, 1983)
- Alex Rodríguez (18, 1994) Team Record
- Alex Rodríguez (19, 1995)
- Félix Hernández (19, 2005)
- Félix Hernández (20, 2006)

== See also ==
- Baseball awards
- List of Seattle Mariners team records
