= Cal Raleigh =

American baseball player (born 1996)

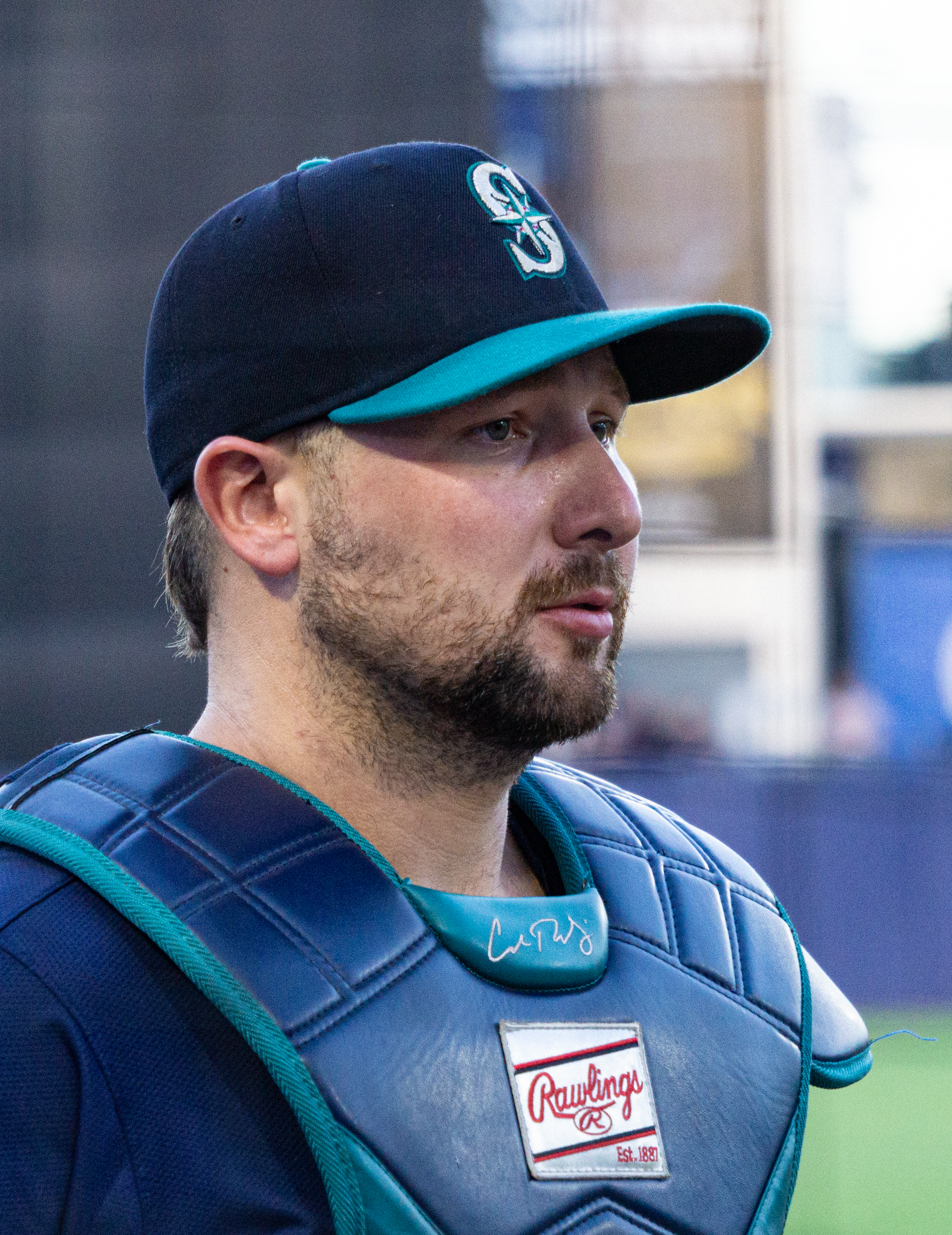
- Raleigh with the Seattle Mariners in 2025

Seattle Mariners – No. 29
- Catcher
- Born: November 26, 1996 (age 29); Harrisonburg, Virginia, U.S.
- Bats: Switch Throws: Right

MLB debut
- July 11, 2021, for the Seattle Mariners

MLB statistics (through 2026 season)
- Batting average: .218
- Home runs: 176
- Runs batted in: 445
- Stats at Baseball Reference

Teams
- Seattle Mariners (2021–present)

Career highlights and awards
- All-Star (2025); All-MLB First Team (2025); Gold Glove Award (2024); Silver Slugger Award (2025); MLB home run leader (2025); AL RBI leader (2025); MLB records: Most home runs by a catcher or a switch hitter, single season (60 in 2025)
Medals
Men's baseball
Representing United States
World Baseball Classic
Silver medal – second place	2026 Miami	Team

Caleb John Raleigh (born November 26, 1996), nicknamed "Big Dumper", is an American professional baseball catcher for the Seattle Mariners of Major League Baseball (MLB). Following the 2025 season, Raleigh was considered one of MLB's elite power hitters, all-around catchers, and switch hitters.

In 2024, Raleigh won an American League (AL) Gold Glove Award and the Platinum Glove Award, given to the best defensive player in the league. In 2025, he earned his first All-Star selection, became the first catcher and switch hitter to win the MLB Home Run Derby, and broke the record for the most home runs in a season by a catcher and a switch hitter. He also became the seventh player in MLB history to hit 60 home runs in a season and won The Sporting News MLB Player of the Year Award, the Players Choice Awards for Player of the Year and AL Outstanding Player, the Baseball Digest Player of the Year Award.

== Amateur career ==
Raleigh attended Knoxville Catholic High School in Knoxville, Tennessee, then transferred to Smoky Mountain High School in Sylva, North Carolina when his family moved. In his senior season, he hit .469 with 10 home runs and 20 stolen bases. He was named an All-American by Louisville Slugger, MaxPreps, and Under Armour. He played in the Under Armour All-America Game at Wrigley Field. He was named a conference player of the year in baseball and basketball.

After originally committing to play for Clemson, Raleigh attended Florida State University (FSU), playing college baseball for the Seminoles. In 2016, he started all but one game and hit .301 with a .412 on-base percentage and was named a freshman All-American by Baseball America, the National Collegiate Baseball Writers Association, Louisville Slugger, and Perfect Game. That summer, he played collegiate summer baseball with the Harwich Mariners of the Cape Cod Baseball League, struggling to a .204 batting average.

Raleigh had several dramatic hits in 2017, including driving in the winning run in the Atlantic Coast Conference championship game, driving in the tying run in the Super Regional final against Sam Houston State, and hitting a home run in the bottom of the ninth inning of a College World Series game against the LSU Tigers. He hit only .227 in his sophomore season while dealing with a left thumb injury. In 2018, his final year at FSU, he slashed .326/.447/.583 with 13 home runs and 54 RBIs in 62 games.

== Professional career ==
=== Seattle Mariners ===
==== Minor leagues (2018–2021) ====
Raleigh was drafted by the Seattle Mariners in the third round, with the 90th overall pick, of the 2018 Major League Baseball (MLB) draft. His struggles in his second year at Florida State lowered his draft stock. He signed with the Mariners, receiving an $854,000 signing bonus, $221,300 above the slot value for his pick. Raleigh made his professional debut that summer with the Low-A Everett AquaSox, batting .288 with eight home runs and 29 RBIs in 38 games. He started 2019 with the High-A Modesto Nuts, where he was named a California League All-Star. He first became teammates with future All-Star pitcher Logan Gilbert in Modesto. Both prospects were promoted to the Double-A Arkansas Travelers in mid-July. In 121 games for the two clubs, Raleigh slashed .251/.323/.497 with 29 home runs and 82 RBIs.

Raleigh practiced and scrimmaged at the Mariners' alternate site in Tacoma in 2020 but did not play in a game because the Minor League Baseball season was cancelled due to the COVID-19 pandemic. Raleigh returned to Tacoma to start 2021 with the Triple-A Tacoma Rainiers, hitting .324/.377/.608 with nine home runs in 44 games. He had a 23-game hitting streaking that lasted into June.

==== 2021: MLB debut ====
On July 11, 2021, Raleigh was selected to the 40-man roster and promoted to the major leagues for the first time. He made his MLB debut that day, starting at catcher against the Los Angeles Angels, striking out twice in four hitless at bats. Raleigh recorded his first career hits and RBIs with a two-RBI double and single against Germán Márquez of the Colorado Rockies on July 20. On July 23, Raleigh hit his first MLB home run, a two-run, 444-foot blast off Oakland Athletics starter Frankie Montas. Splitting time at catcher with Tom Murphy, Raleigh finished the 2021 season with a .180/.223/.309 slash line, two home runs, 13 RBI, and 52 strikeouts in 47 games.

==== 2022: drought-ending home run ====
Raleigh started 2022 continuing to struggle to make contact, with an .083 batting average and striking out in 32 percent of his plate appearances in his first nine games. He was optioned down to Tacoma on April 28, returning to the Mariners on May 7 after Murphy suffered a dislocated shoulder. After batting .091 in the next 10 games, Raleigh's bat blossomed, hitting .228 with an .854 on-base plus slugging (OPS) and 24 home runs the rest of the season. On September 30, Raleigh hit a pinch-hit, walk-off home run against Domingo Acevedo of the Athletics to clinch the Mariners' first postseason appearance since 2001, ending the longest active playoff drought amongst the four major North American sports leagues. Raleigh finished the regular season with a .211/.284/.489 slash line, 20 doubles, one triple, and 63 RBI in 119 games. His 27 home runs led MLB catchers and surpassed Mike Zunino for the most home runs by a Mariners catcher in a season. He was a finalist at catcher for the American League (AL) Gold Glove and Silver Slugger awards, losing to Jose Trevino of the New York Yankees and Alejandro Kirk of the Toronto Blue Jays, respectively.

Raleigh also had big hits to start the postseason. In the Wild Card Series against the Toronto Blue Jays, Raleigh hit a two-run home run off of Alek Manoah in Game 1. In the second game, he hit an RBI single off of Anthony Bass, then scored the winning run. However, his offense disappeared in the AL Division Series (ALDS), as he went 1-for-14 in three consecutive losses to the Houston Astros.

==== 2023 ====
On May 15, 2023, Raleigh became the first catcher to homer from both sides of the plate in the same game at Fenway Park, hitting his home runs in consecutive plate appearances. In 145 games for Seattle in 2023, he batted .232/.306/.456 with 30 home runs and 75 RBI. When the Mariners were eliminated from postseason contention, Raleigh criticized the Mariners' lack of spending, saying, "Sometimes, you have to go out and you have to buy. That's just the name of the game." He was a Silver Slugger finalist again in 2023.

==== 2024: Platinum Glove ====
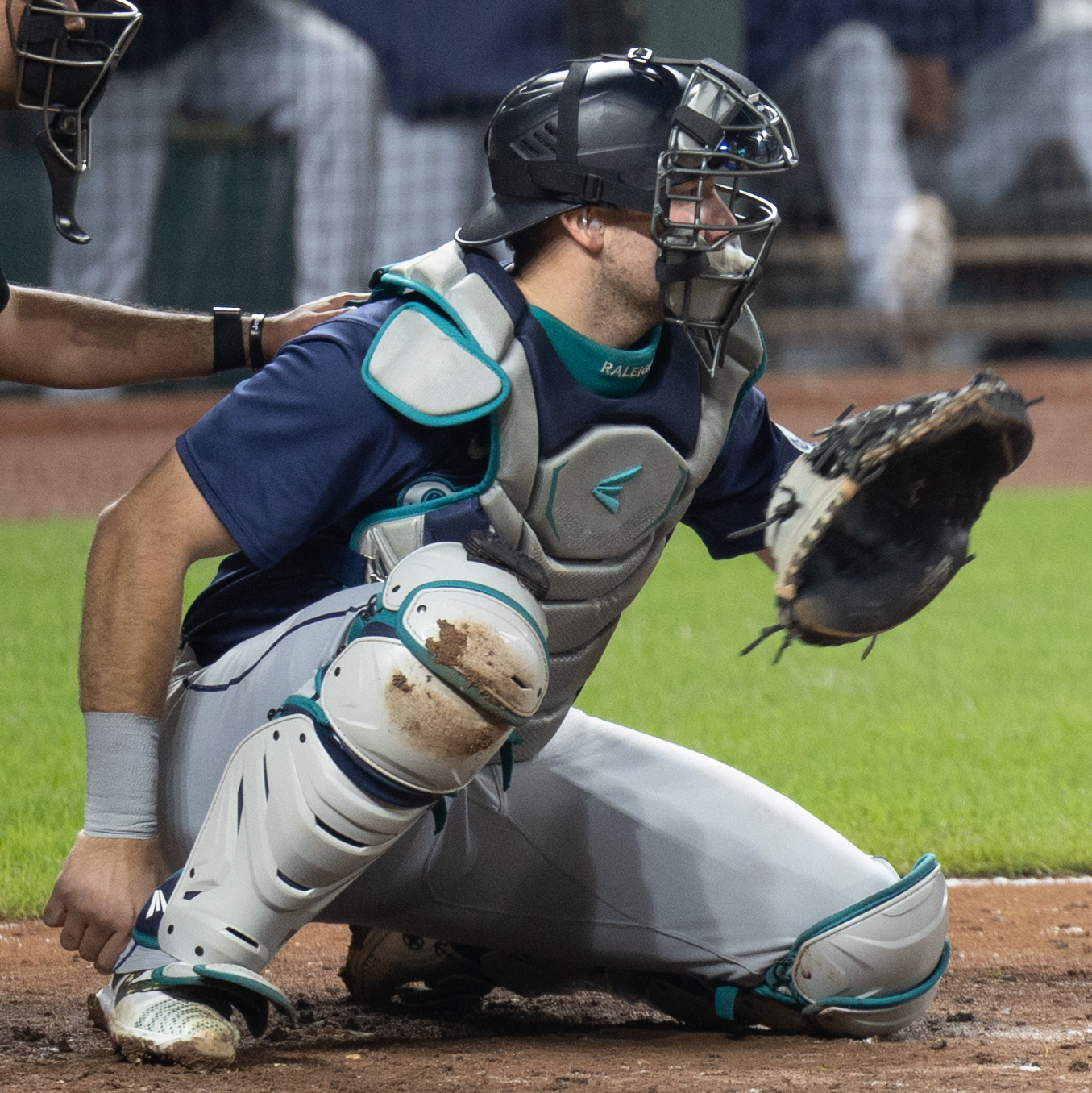
Raleigh in 2024

Raleigh broke a tooth after biting down on a sandwich on April 23, 2024. Despite severe pain, he hit a home run in that night's game against the Texas Rangers. He had oral surgery the following day, missing just one game before his return to catching. On June 10, Raleigh hit a walk-off grand slam off Jordan Leasure, capping off a 8–4 comeback win over the Chicago White Sox. Raleigh homered from both sides of the plate twice in July, on July 9 against the San Diego Padres, then two days later against the Angels. In the Mariners' final game of the season, Raleigh hit his 34th home run to reach 100 RBIs in a season for the first time in his career. It was his 93rd career home run, topping Mike Piazza for the most home runs in a catcher's first four MLB seasons. However, Raleigh hit 15 of his home runs as designated hitter or pinch hitter, while Piazza hit only one home run while not playing catcher in his first four seasons.

Raleigh hit .220/.312/.436 with 34 home runs, 100 RBI, and stolen bases and 176 strikeouts. He won the Gold Glove and Platinum Glove awards in 2024, becoming the first Mariner in franchise history to receive the latter honor. Raleigh particularly excelled as a pitch framer, playing a key role in elevating the Mariners' rotation to one of the most dominant and consistent in baseball. He was a Silver Slugger finalist for the third consecutive year.

==== 2025: Home run records ====
On March 25, 2025, Raleigh and the Mariners agreed to a six-year, $105 million contract extension, with a seventh-year vesting player option worth $20 million, with a $2 million buyout.

===== First half: June Player of the Month =====
On April 11, Raleigh became the Mariners' franchise home run leader among catchers, hitting his 96th career home run. On April 16, Raleigh recorded his 100th career home run. He became the fourth-fastest catcher (482 games) to reach 100 home runs, trailing Gary Sánchez (355), Piazza (422), and Rudy York (422). He hit 10 home runs in April, tied for the major league lead with Aaron Judge and Eugenio Suárez. On May 30 against the Minnesota Twins, Raleigh hit a three-run home run in the bottom of the first inning, becoming the first MLB catcher to hit 20 home runs before the end of May. It was just the 29th time in MLB history and the fifth time a Mariners player has reached 20 home runs by the end of May, joining Ken Griffey Jr. (three times, in 1994, 1997, and 1999) and Alex Rodriguez (1998). On June 2, Raleigh was named the AL Player of the Week, shared with Junior Caminero for May 26–June 1, a span in which he batted .348 with 6 home runs, 10 RBI, and a 1.575 OPS. It was his first career Player of the Week Award.

Raleigh became the first player in the season to reach 25 home runs on June 7 when he hit a three-run home run off Jack Kochanowicz of the Angels in the first inning. On June 17, Raleigh stole his eighth base, the most stolen bases in a single season by a catcher in franchise history. On June 20, Raleigh hit his 28th and 29th home runs against the Chicago Cubs. With his performance, Raleigh passed Johnny Bench's record, set in 1970, for the most home runs by a primary catcher before the All-Star break. On June 21, Raleigh became the first player to reach 30 home runs in the season and became the first catcher and switch hitter in MLB history to hit 30 home runs before the All-Star break. He was also the fastest player to reach 30 home runs in a season since Barry Bonds and Luis Gonzales in 2001. Griffey was the only other Mariner to hit 30 home runs before the break. On June 23, Raleigh was named the AL Player of the Week for June 16–22, during which he batted .417 with 10 runs, five home runs, 12 RBI, and a 1.606 OPS.

At the end of June, Raleigh had 33 home runs, tied for the third-most home runs in major league history through June with Griffey and Sammy Sosa in 1998 and trailing only Barry Bonds with 39 in 2001 and Mark McGwire with 37 in 1998. Raleigh was named the AL Player of the Month in June, after slashing .300/.398/.690 with 11 home runs and 27 RBIs on the month. It was Raleigh's first monthly award.

On July 4, Raleigh hit two home runs against the Pittsburgh Pirates, setting a new single-season career high of 35 home runs. He matched Griffey's 1998 season for most home runs in franchise history before the All-Star break. Raleigh's first home run had a 114.7 mph exit velocity, the hardest-hit ball of his career. On July 8, Raleigh passed Griffey for the most home runs hit before the All-Star break in Mariners history with a home run against the Yankees. On July 11, in a game against the Detroit Tigers, Raleigh hit two home runs—his 37th and 38th of the season. The second was a grand slam and brought him within one home run of Bonds' MLB record of 39 home runs before the All-Star break. With those two home runs, Raleigh set the AL record for most home runs before the All-Star Break.

===== All-Star break and second half: home run records chase =====
Raleigh was selected to start in the All-Star Game on July 2, winning both the fan vote and player vote and trailing only Judge in total votes. Previously, on June 27, Raleigh announced that he would compete in the Home Run Derby, and invited his father Todd, to pitch to him with his younger brother Todd Jr. catching. Raleigh won the Home Run Derby, defeating Caminero in the final round, 18–15. Raleigh became the first switch hitter to win the derby outright, the second Mariner to win the derby (following Griffey, who won in 1994, 1998, and 1999), and the first catcher to win the derby. In the All-Star Game, Raleigh successfully challenged a called ball, with the automated ball-strike challenge system used in the game for the first time changing a Tarik Skubal pitch to a strike. Raleigh was 1-for-2 in his first All-Star Game, singling off David Peterson.

On July 22, Raleigh tied Griffey with the most homers in a player's first five seasons in franchise history, with 132 when he scored the only run of the game with a solo home run against the Milwaukee Brewers. On July 27, Raleigh hit a 416-foot home run off José Fermín of the Angels. With that homer, Raleigh became the first catcher and first switch hitter in MLB history to hit 40 home runs before the end of July. He was the fifth different player in Mariners franchise history to hit at least 40 home runs in a single season, putting him alongside Griffey, Jay Buhner, Rodriguez, and Nelson Cruz.

On August 24, Raleigh hit his 48th and 49th home runs against the Athletics. With that performance, he set the single-season home run record by a player who primarily plays catcher, passing Salvador Perez. He also set records for most multi-homer games in a season by a switch hitter with nine, surpassing Mickey Mantle, and most multi-homer games in a season in Mariners history, besting Griffey. On August 25, Raleigh hit his 50th home run of the season against San Diego pitcher JP Sears, becoming the first primary catcher to hit 50 home runs in a season and the second Mariner to do so after Griffey. He also became the first switch hitter to hit 20 home runs from each side of the plate in a season. Raleigh slumped in August, batting .179 with 8 home runs and 9 non-home run hits.

On September 14, Raleigh tied Mantle's 1961 record for most home runs by a switch hitter. That homer was also Raleigh's 43rd home run this season while playing catcher, passing Javy Lopez in 2003 for the single-season record. On September 16, Raleigh broke Mantle's record, hitting home runs 55 and 56 of the season. He tied Griffey for the most home runs in a season by a Mariner. On September 20, Raleigh hit his 57th home run of the season, passing Griffey for the most home runs in a season in franchise history in a win over the Astros. On September 24, Raleigh hit two home runs to reach his final total of 60 home runs, which led the majors. He was the first catcher to hit 60 home runs, and one of only seven players in MLB history to hit 60 home runs in a season, and the first in the AL who was not on the Yankees. He also tied the MLB record with 11 multi-homer games in a season, joining Hank Greenberg, Sosa, and Judge. These achievements came in a 9–2 victory over the Colorado Rockies, with the Mariners clinching their first AL West title since 2001.

Raleigh finished the regular season with a .247/.359/.589 slash line, setting new career highs with 147 hits, 110 runs scored, 24 doubles, and 14 stolen bases across 159 games. He led the AL with 125 RBI and led the majors with 60 home runs.

Raleigh finished second place in a tight vote for the AL Most Valuable Player Award, receiving 13 first-place votes, four fewer than Judge. Both Raleigh and Judge received first or second place votes from all 30 voters. Raleigh won the Player of the Year Award from the MLB Players Association, the Sporting News, and Baseball Digest. He also won the Silver Slugger Award as the best hitting AL catcher and was named to the All-MLB First Team.

===== Postseason =====
Raleigh batted .381 with 4 walks in the five-game ALDS win over the Detroit Tigers. In Game 2, he doubled and scored the game-winning run in the eighth inning. He homered in the ninth inning of Game 3 in Detroit. His home run ball was caught by a fan wearing a homemade shirt saying "Dump 61 Here," referring to Raleigh's nickname and season home run total. The fan then took off the shirt, showing a "Dump 62 Here" shirt underneath. He met Raleigh after the game. In the 15-inning Game 5, Raleigh was 1-for-5 with two walks and three strikeouts. He committed a passed ball, after allowing none in the regular season, and threw out a would-be base stealer.

In Game 1 of the AL Championship Series (ALCS), a rematch of the 2022 Wild Card Series against the Toronto Blue Jays, Raleigh hit a game-tying home run off Kevin Gausman in the sixth inning, his first career ALCS home run and his 9th home run in 14 regular and postseason games at Rogers Centre. In the bottom of the eighth inning of Game 5, Raleigh hit a game-tying home run to help lead the Mariners to a 6–2 victory. In Game 7, Raleigh hit his fifth home run of the postseason to help extend the Mariners lead to 3–1. Seattle would lose 4–3, denying them a chance at their first World Series appearance in franchise history.

==== 2026 ====
On May 15, 2026, Raleigh was placed on the injured list for the first time in his career due to a right oblique strain. He returned on June 16. Against the Philadelphia Phillies on August 24, he had his first career three-homer game. He hit another one the next night, tying Mike Cameron's franchise record of four consecutive at-bats with a home run.

== International career ==
Raleigh was part of the United States national team for the 2026 World Baseball Classic (WBC) as one of two catchers, along with Will Smith of the Los Angeles Dodgers. During a pool play game against Mexico, Raleigh refused to shake hands with Mariners teammate Randy Arozarena, who played for Mexico. After the game, Arozarena praised Raleigh's parents while criticizing Raleigh. Facing Canada in the quarterfinals, Mariners teammate Josh Naylor tried to fist bump Raleigh, which the catcher refused. After the game, Naylor said he was joking with Raleigh and called him a good teammate. Sharing time with Smith, Raleigh batted 0-for-9 with one RBI and four walks in three games in the WBC as the U.S. lost in the championship game to Venezuela.

== Personal life ==
Many of Raleigh's relatives also play baseball. His father, Todd Raleigh, coached college baseball for the Western Carolina Catamounts and Tennessee Volunteers and was a catcher for Western Carolina from 1988 to 1991. Raleigh's younger brother Todd Jr., nicknamed "T," is, like Cal, a switch-hitting catcher. Todd Jr. served as the catcher for Cal in the 2025 Home Run Derby. Raleigh's uncle Matt was a minor league infielder and coach after playing alongside Todd at Western Carolina. Raleigh's cousin and Matt's son, Brody, is an outfielder at Western Carolina and won the 2016 Little League World Series. Raleigh has two other siblings.

Raleigh's Big Dumper nickname, referring to his large butt, was popularized by former teammate Jarred Kelenic, who started using it in 2020 and tweeted it in 2021 when Raleigh was promoted to the Mariners. Raleigh's mother said she thinks the nickname "stinks" but appreciates fans' support for him.

As a child, Raleigh rooted for Jason Varitek and the Boston Red Sox.

Raleigh attended Catholic schools in Knoxville, Tennessee growing up, including Sacred Heart Catholic School before high school. He earned his degree in business entrepreneurship from FSU in December 2020.

On June 13, 2024, Raleigh had his head shaved by Mariner Hall of Famer Jay Buhner as part of the team's "Buhner Buzz Cut" promotion.

== Career accomplishments ==
=== MLB records ===
- Most home runs hit in a season by a primary catcher: 60 (2025)
- Most home runs hit in a season while playing as a catcher: 49 (2025)
- Most home runs in a season by a switch hitter: 60 (2025)

=== Seattle Mariners records ===
- Most home runs in a season: 60 (2025)
- Home runs in consecutive at-bats: 4 (tied with Mike Cameron)

=== Awards and honors ===
MLB

- Home Run Derby champion (2025)
- AL Player of the Month (June 2025)
- 3× American League (AL) Player of the Week (May 26 - June 1, 2025, co-winner; June 16-22, 2025; August 24-30, 2026)

== See also ==
- List of Seattle Mariners team records
- Seattle Mariners award winners and league leaders
- List of Major League Baseball annual home run leaders
- List of Major League Baseball annual putouts leaders
- List of Major League Baseball annual runs batted in leaders

Awards
Preceded by Aaron Judge	American League Player of the Month; June 2025	Succeeded by Nick Kurtz
