= Players Choice Awards =

Baseball awards

- Awarded for: Major Leaguers recognize the on-field and off-field achievements of their peers through the Players Trust’s Players Choice Awards program.
- Location: Dallas, Texas (2018)
- Presented by: Major League Baseball Players Association

History
- First award: 1992
- Most recent: 2026
- Website: playerstrust.org/programs/playerschoiceawards/

The Players Choice Awards are annual Major League Baseball awards, given by the Major League Baseball Players Association (MLBPA).

The Players Choice Awards are given following a secret ballot by players. Four awards go to a player in each league, while two awards each go to one player in all of Major League Baseball. Prize money is donated to a charity of each winner's choice.

The first Players Choice Awards were given in 1992, to the Comeback Player in each of the two major leagues. There were no other awards that year. In 1993, the Comeback Player awards were replaced by an Outstanding Player award for each league. Then, in 1994, two more categories were added: Outstanding Pitcher (in each league) and Outstanding Rookie (in each league).

In 1997, the dual Comeback Player awards were again named, along with the first-ever single award – the Man of the Year – for one player in all of Major League Baseball. In 1998, a second non-dual award was added, Player of the Year. In addition, the Man of the Year award was renamed in honor of Marvin Miller, former executive director of the Major League Baseball Players Association. In 1999, a special Player of the Decade award was given.

In 2015, a third non-dual award was created. The "Always Game" award is given to the player who – game in and game out – constantly exhibits positive energy, grit, tenacity, hustle, perseverance, relentlessness and sportsmanship; all for the benefit of his teammates and fans.

== Awards for one player in all of Major League Baseball ==
=== Player of the Year ===
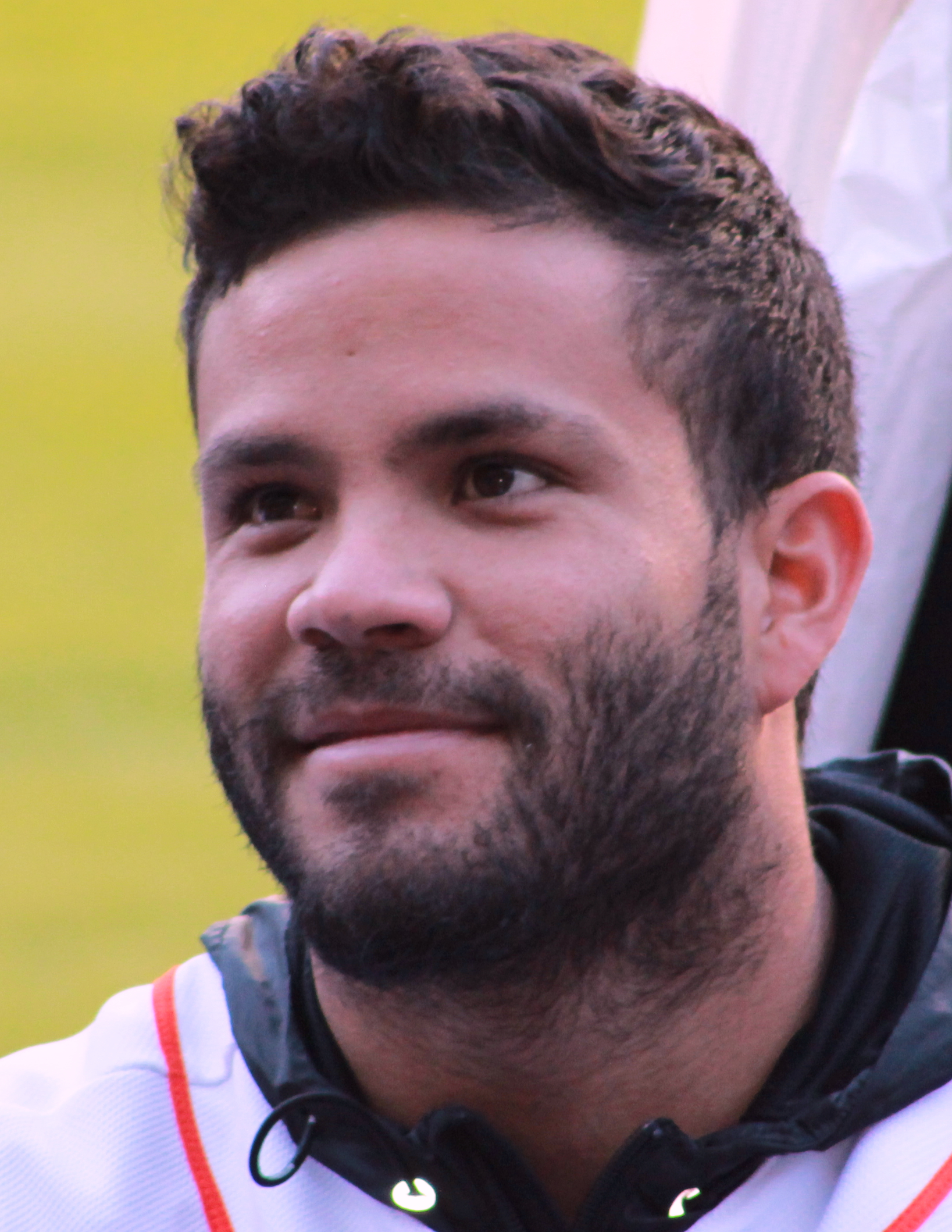
Jose Altuve was Player of the Year in 2016 and 2017.

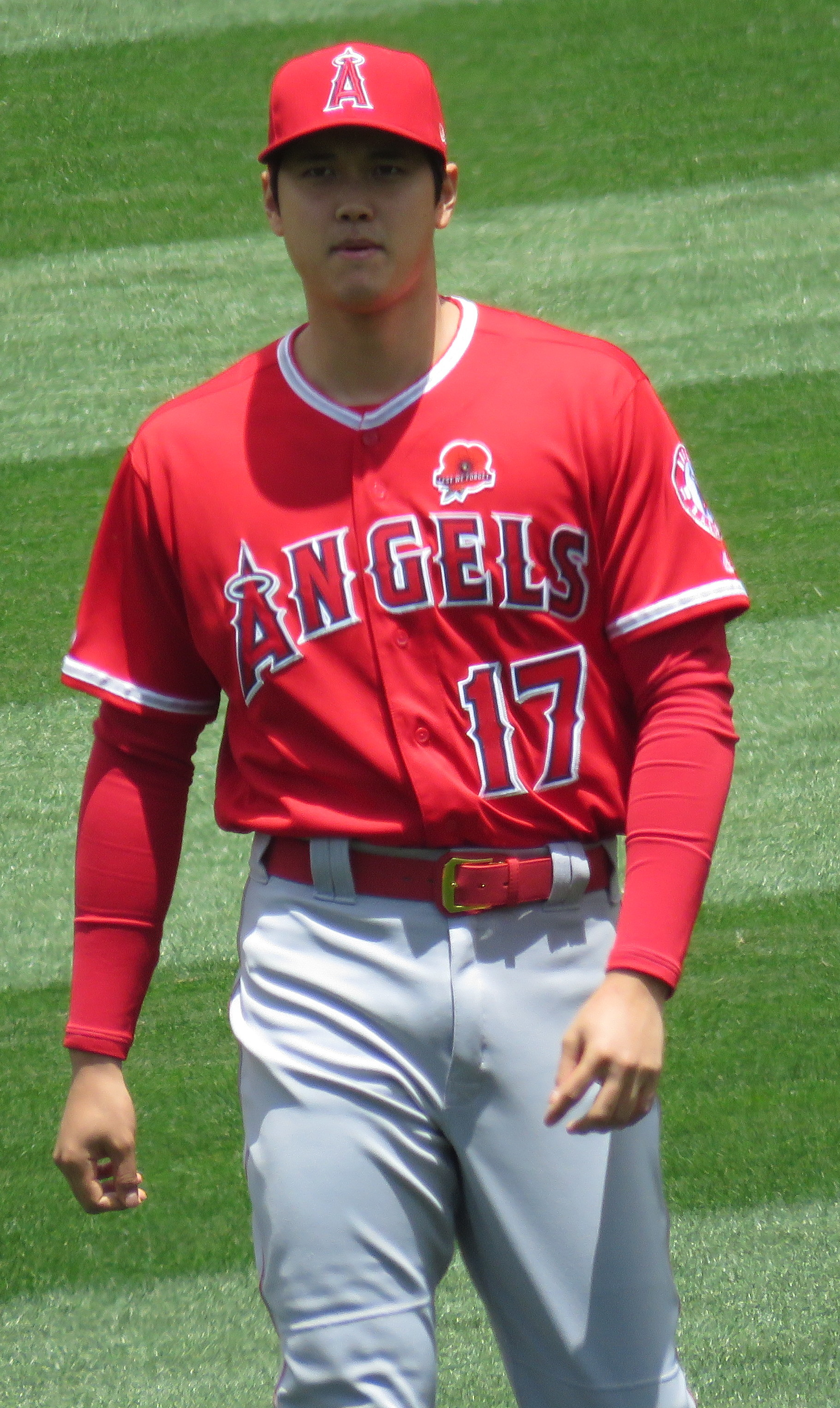
Shohei Ohtani was Player of the Year in 2021.

This award was first given in 1998.

Year	Winner	Team
1998	Mark McGwire	St. Louis Cardinals
1999	Pedro Martínez	Boston Red Sox
2000	Carlos Delgado	Toronto Blue Jays
2001	Barry Bonds (1)	San Francisco Giants
2002	Alex Rodriguez (1)	Texas Rangers
2003	Albert Pujols (1)	St. Louis Cardinals
2004	Barry Bonds (2)	San Francisco Giants
2005	Andruw Jones	Atlanta Braves
2006	Ryan Howard	Philadelphia Phillies
2007	Alex Rodriguez (2)	New York Yankees
2008	Albert Pujols (2)	St. Louis Cardinals
2009	Albert Pujols (3)	St. Louis Cardinals
2010	Carlos González	Colorado Rockies
2011	Justin Verlander	Detroit Tigers
2012	Miguel Cabrera	Detroit Tigers
2013	Miguel Cabrera (2)	Detroit Tigers
2014	Clayton Kershaw	Los Angeles Dodgers
2015	Josh Donaldson	Toronto Blue Jays
2016	Jose Altuve	Houston Astros
2017	Jose Altuve (2)	Houston Astros
2018	J.D. Martinez	Boston Red Sox
2019	Mike Trout	Los Angeles Angels
2020	Freddie Freeman	Atlanta Braves
2021	Shohei Ohtani	Los Angeles Angels
2022	Aaron Judge	New York Yankees
2023	Ronald Acuña Jr.	Atlanta Braves
2024	Aaron Judge (2)	New York Yankees
2025	Cal Raleigh	Seattle Mariners
2026	Pete Crow-Armstrong	Chicago Cubs

=== The Marvin Miller Man of the Year Award ===
This award is given to "the player in either league whose on-field performance and contributions to his community inspire others to higher levels of achievement." First given in 1997 (as the "Man of the Year" Award), it was renamed in 1998 in honor of Marvin Miller, former executive director of the Major League Baseball Players Association.

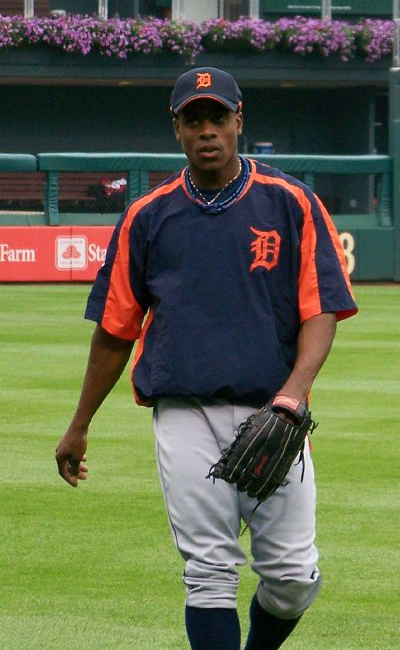
Curtis Granderson has won the Man of the Year Award four times.

Year	Winner	Team
1997	Mark McGwire	Oakland Athletics and St. Louis Cardinals
1998	Paul Molitor	Minnesota Twins
1999	Sammy Sosa	Chicago Cubs
2000	Eric Davis	St. Louis Cardinals
2001	Jim Thome (1)	Cleveland Indians
2002	John Smoltz (1)	Atlanta Braves
2003	John Smoltz (2)	Atlanta Braves
2004	Jim Thome (2)	Philadelphia Phillies
2005	Mike Sweeney	Kansas City Royals
2006	Albert Pujols	St. Louis Cardinals
2007	Torii Hunter	Minnesota Twins
2008	Michael Young (1)	Texas Rangers
2009	Curtis Granderson (1)	Detroit Tigers
2010	Brandon Inge	Detroit Tigers
2011	Michael Young (2)	Texas Rangers
2012	Chipper Jones	Atlanta Braves
2013	Mariano Rivera	New York Yankees
2014	Clayton Kershaw	Los Angeles Dodgers
2015	Adam Jones	Baltimore Orioles
2016	Curtis Granderson (2)	New York Mets
2017	Anthony Rizzo	Chicago Cubs
2018	Curtis Granderson (3)	Toronto Blue Jays and Milwaukee Brewers
2019	Curtis Granderson (4)	Miami Marlins
2020	Nelson Cruz	Minnesota Twins
2021	Marcus Semien (1)	Toronto Blue Jays
2022	Francisco Lindor	New York Mets
2023	Marcus Semien (2)	Toronto Blue Jays
2024	Rhys Hoskins	Milwaukee Brewers
2025	Brent Suter	Cincinnati Reds
2026	Chris Bassitt	Baltimore Orioles

=== Curt Flood Award ===
First handed out in 2020, this award is given to a former player, living or deceased, who in the image of Curt Flood demonstrated a selfless, longtime devotion to the Players Association and advancement of Players’ rights.

Year	Winner
2020	Andre Dawson
2021	Mark Belanger
2022	Steve Rogers
2023	Phil Bradley
2024	Dave Winfield
2025	Don Baylor and Scott Sanderson
2026	David Cone

=== Majestic Athletic Always Game Award ===
This award was first given in 2015. The award was not included in the list of 2018 winners.

Year	Winner	Team
2015	Jose Altuve	Houston Astros
2016	Jose Altuve (2)	Houston Astros
2017	Nolan Arenado	Colorado Rockies

== Awards for a player in each league ==
=== Outstanding Player ===
First awarded in 1993.

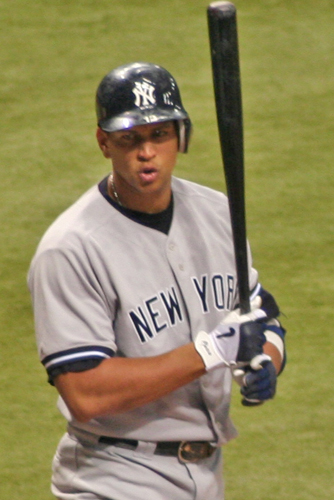
Alex Rodriguez was AL Outstanding Player six times.

Year	American League		National League	
Year	Player	Team	Player	Team
1993	Frank Thomas (1)	Chicago White Sox	Barry Bonds (1)	San Francisco Giants
1994	Frank Thomas (2)	Chicago White Sox	Jeff Bagwell	Houston Astros
1995	Albert Belle	Cleveland Indians	Dante Bichette	Colorado Rockies
1996	Alex Rodriguez (1)	Seattle Mariners	Ken Caminiti	San Diego Padres
1997	Ken Griffey Jr.	Seattle Mariners	Larry Walker	Colorado Rockies
1998	Alex Rodriguez (2)	Seattle Mariners	Sammy Sosa	Chicago Cubs
1999	Manny Ramírez	Cleveland Indians	Chipper Jones	Atlanta Braves
2000	Carlos Delgado	Toronto Blue Jays	Todd Helton	Colorado Rockies
2001	Alex Rodriguez (3)	Texas Rangers	Barry Bonds (2)	San Francisco Giants
2002	Alex Rodriguez (4)	Texas Rangers	Barry Bonds (3)	San Francisco Giants
2003	Alex Rodriguez (5)	Texas Rangers	Albert Pujols (1)	St. Louis Cardinals
2004	Ichiro Suzuki	Seattle Mariners	Barry Bonds (4)	San Francisco Giants
2005	David Ortiz	Boston Red Sox	Andruw Jones	Atlanta Braves
2006	Jermaine Dye	Chicago White Sox	Ryan Howard	Philadelphia Phillies
2007	Alex Rodriguez (6)	New York Yankees	Prince Fielder	Milwaukee Brewers
2008	Josh Hamilton (1)	Texas Rangers	Albert Pujols (2)	St. Louis Cardinals
2009	Joe Mauer	Minnesota Twins	Albert Pujols (3)	St. Louis Cardinals
2010	Josh Hamilton (2)	Texas Rangers	Carlos González	Colorado Rockies
2011	Curtis Granderson	New York Yankees	Matt Kemp	Los Angeles Dodgers
2012	Miguel Cabrera	Detroit Tigers	Andrew McCutchen	Pittsburgh Pirates
2013	Miguel Cabrera (2)	Detroit Tigers	Andrew McCutchen (2)	Pittsburgh Pirates
2014	Mike Trout	Los Angeles Angels of Anaheim	Giancarlo Stanton	Miami Marlins
2015	Josh Donaldson	Toronto Blue Jays	Bryce Harper	Washington Nationals
2016	Jose Altuve	Houston Astros	Daniel Murphy	Washington Nationals
2017	Jose Altuve (2)	Houston Astros	Giancarlo Stanton (2)	Miami Marlins
2018	Mookie Betts	Boston Red Sox	Christian Yelich	Milwaukee Brewers
2019	Mike Trout (2)	Los Angeles Angels	Anthony Rendon	Washington Nationals
2020	José Abreu	Chicago White Sox	Freddie Freeman	Atlanta Braves
2021	Shohei Ohtani (1)	Los Angeles Angels	Bryce Harper	Philadelphia Phillies
2022	Aaron Judge (1)	New York Yankees	Paul Goldschmidt	St. Louis Cardinals
2023	Shohei Ohtani (2)	Los Angeles Angels	Ronald Acuna Jr.	Atlanta Braves
2024	Aaron Judge (2)	New York Yankees	Shohei Ohtani (3)	Los Angeles Dodgers
2025	Cal Raleigh	Seattle Mariners	Kyle Schwarber	Philadelphia Phillies
2026	Yordan Álvarez	Houston Astros	Pete Crow-Armstrong	Chicago Cubs

=== Outstanding Pitcher ===
First awarded in 1994.

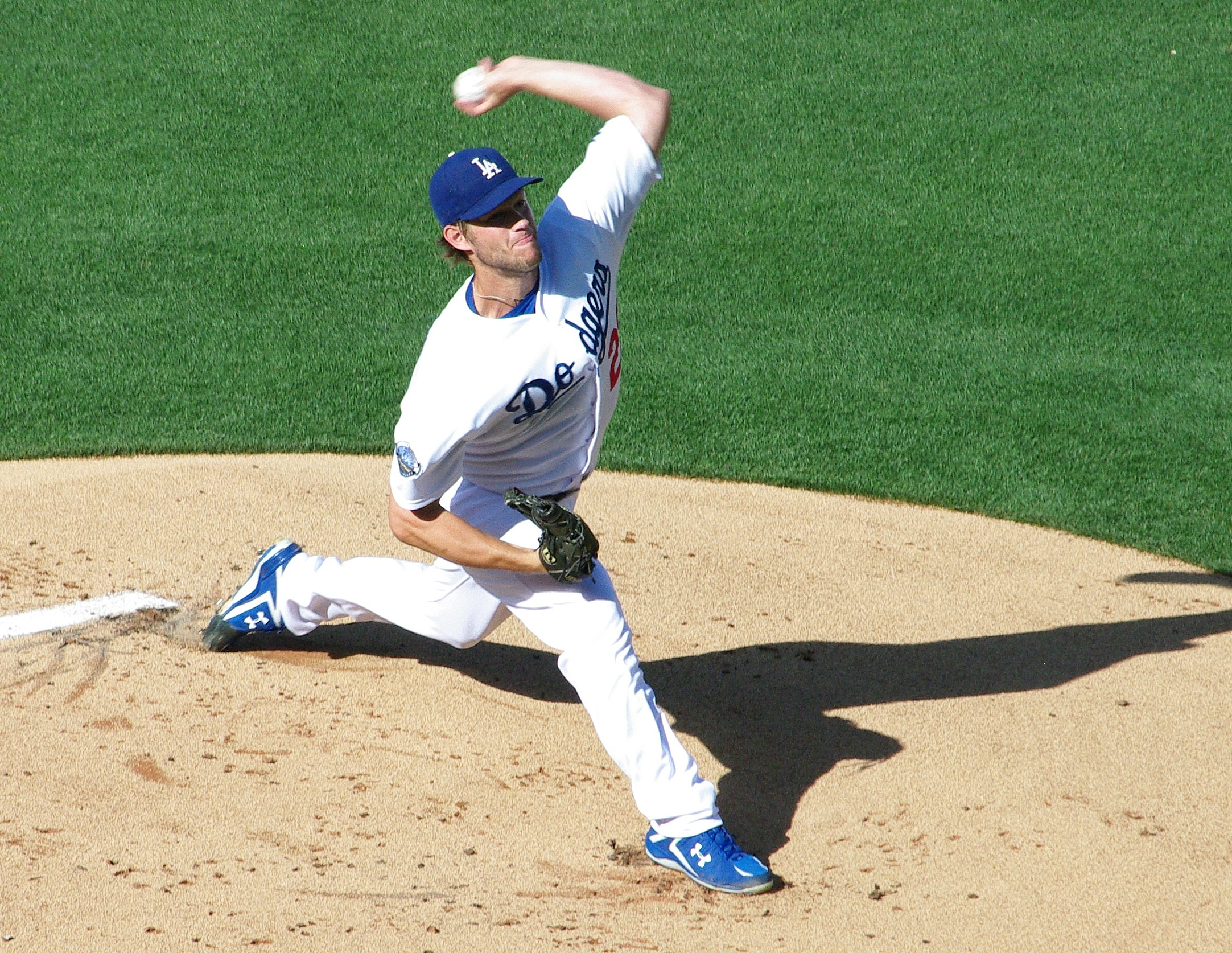
Clayton Kershaw has been NL Outstanding Pitcher three times.

Year	American League		National League	
Year	Player	Team	Player	Team
1994	Jimmy Key	New York Yankees	Greg Maddux (1)	Atlanta Braves
1995	Randy Johnson (1)	Seattle Mariners	Greg Maddux (2)	Atlanta Braves
1996	Pat Hentgen	Toronto Blue Jays	John Smoltz	Atlanta Braves
1997	Roger Clemens (1)	Toronto Blue Jays	Pedro Martínez (1)	Montreal Expos
1998	Pedro Martínez (2); Roger Clemens (2)	Boston Red Sox; Toronto Blue Jays	Greg Maddux (3)	Atlanta Braves
1999	Pedro Martínez (3)	Boston Red Sox	Mike Hampton	Houston Astros
2000	Pedro Martínez (4)	Boston Red Sox	Randy Johnson (2)	Arizona Diamondbacks
2001	Roger Clemens (3)	New York Yankees	Curt Schilling (1)	Arizona Diamondbacks
2002	Barry Zito	Oakland Athletics	Curt Schilling (2)	Arizona Diamondbacks
2003	Roy Halladay	Toronto Blue Jays	Éric Gagné	Los Angeles Dodgers
2004	Johan Santana (1)	Minnesota Twins	Jason Schmidt	San Francisco Giants
2005	Bartolo Colón	Los Angeles Angels of Anaheim	Chris Carpenter (1)	St. Louis Cardinals
2006	Johan Santana (2)	Minnesota Twins	Chris Carpenter (2)	St. Louis Cardinals
2007	CC Sabathia	Cleveland Indians	Jake Peavy	San Diego Padres
2008	Cliff Lee	Cleveland Indians	Tim Lincecum	San Francisco Giants
2009	Zack Greinke (1)	Kansas City Royals	Adam Wainwright	St. Louis Cardinals
2010	David Price (1)	Tampa Bay Rays	Roy Halladay (2)	Philadelphia Phillies
2011	Justin Verlander	Detroit Tigers	Clayton Kershaw (1)	Los Angeles Dodgers
2012	David Price (2)	Tampa Bay Rays	R. A. Dickey	New York Mets
2013	Max Scherzer (1)	Detroit Tigers	Clayton Kershaw (2)	Los Angeles Dodgers
2014	Félix Hernández	Seattle Mariners	Clayton Kershaw (3)	Los Angeles Dodgers
2015	Dallas Keuchel	Houston Astros	Zack Greinke (2)	Los Angeles Dodgers
2016	Rick Porcello	Boston Red Sox	Kyle Hendricks	Chicago Cubs
2017	Corey Kluber	Cleveland Indians	Max Scherzer (2)	Washington Nationals
2018	Blake Snell	Tampa Bay Rays	Jacob deGrom	New York Mets
2019	Justin Verlander (2)	Houston Astros	Jacob deGrom (2)	New York Mets
2020	Shane Bieber	Cleveland Indians	Trevor Bauer	Cincinnati Reds
2021	Robbie Ray	Toronto Blue Jays	Max Scherzer (3)	Washington Nationals; Los Angeles Dodgers
2022	Justin Verlander (3)	Houston Astros	Sandy Alcántara	Miami Marlins
2023	Gerrit Cole	New York Yankees	Blake Snell	San Diego Padres
2024	Tarik Skubal (1)	Detroit Tigers	Chris Sale	Atlanta Braves
2025	Tarik Skubal (2)	Detroit Tigers	Paul Skenes	Pittsburgh Pirates
2026	Cam Schlittler	New York Yankees	Jacob Misiorowski	Milwaukee Brewers

=== Outstanding Rookie ===
First awarded in 1994.

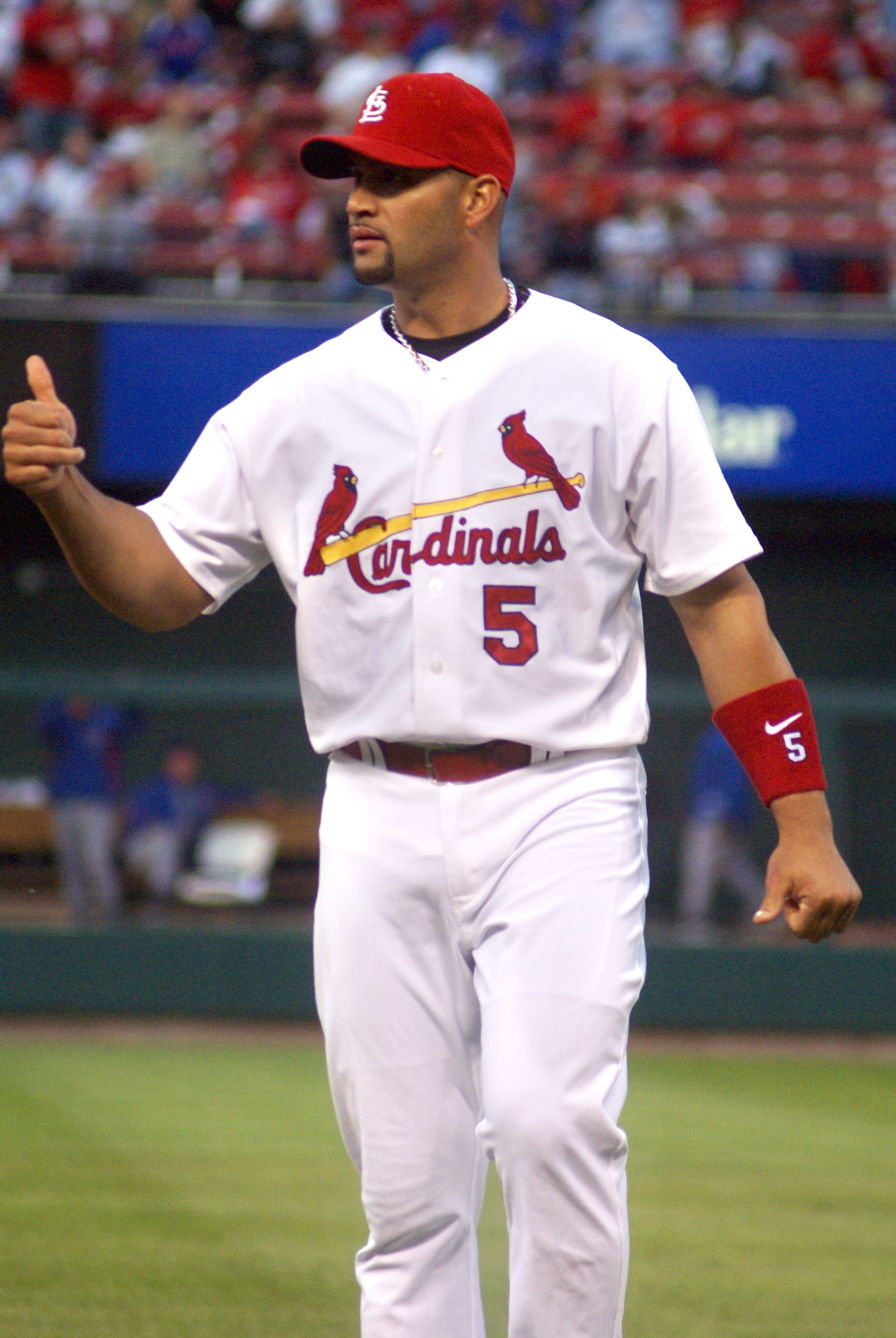
In 2001, Albert Pujols was the Outstanding Rookie in the National League.

Year	American League		National League	
Year	Player	Team	Player	Team
1994	Bob Hamelin	Kansas City Royals	Raúl Mondesí	Los Angeles Dodgers
1995	Marty Cordova	Minnesota Twins	Chipper Jones	Atlanta Braves
1996	Derek Jeter	New York Yankees	Todd Hollandsworth	Los Angeles Dodgers
1997	Nomar Garciaparra	Boston Red Sox	Scott Rolen	Philadelphia Phillies
1998	Ben Grieve	Oakland Athletics	Kerry Wood	Chicago Cubs
1999	Carlos Beltrán	Kansas City Royals	Preston Wilson	Florida Marlins
2000	Terrence Long	Oakland Athletics	Rafael Furcal	Atlanta Braves
2001	Ichiro Suzuki	Seattle Mariners	Albert Pujols	St. Louis Cardinals
2002	Eric Hinske	Toronto Blue Jays	Jason Jennings	Colorado Rockies
2003	Ángel Berroa	Kansas City Royals	Scott Podsednik	Milwaukee Brewers
2004	Bobby Crosby	Oakland Athletics	Jason Bay	Pittsburgh Pirates
2005	Huston Street	Oakland Athletics	Willy Taveras	Houston Astros
2006	Justin Verlander	Detroit Tigers	Dan Uggla	Florida Marlins
2007	Dustin Pedroia	Boston Red Sox	Ryan Braun	Milwaukee Brewers
2008	Evan Longoria	Tampa Bay Rays	Geovany Soto	Chicago Cubs
2009	Gordon Beckham	Chicago White Sox	J. A. Happ	Philadelphia Phillies
2010	Austin Jackson	Detroit Tigers	Buster Posey	San Francisco Giants
2011	Mark Trumbo	Los Angeles Angels of Anaheim	Craig Kimbrel	Atlanta Braves
2012	Mike Trout	Los Angeles Angels of Anaheim	Todd Frazier	Cincinnati Reds
2013	Wil Myers	Tampa Bay Rays	José Fernández	Miami Marlins
2014	José Abreu	Chicago White Sox	Jacob deGrom	New York Mets
2015	Carlos Correa	Houston Astros	Kris Bryant	Chicago Cubs
2016	Michael Fulmer	Detroit Tigers	Corey Seager	Los Angeles Dodgers
2017	Aaron Judge	New York Yankees	Cody Bellinger	Los Angeles Dodgers
2018	Miguel Andújar	New York Yankees	Ronald Acuña Jr.	Atlanta Braves
2019	Yordan Alvarez	Houston Astros	Pete Alonso	New York Mets
2020	Kyle Lewis	Seattle Mariners	Jake Cronenworth	San Diego Padres
2021	Ryan Mountcastle	Baltimore Orioles	Jonathan India	Cincinnati Reds
2022	Julio Rodríguez	Seattle Mariners	Spencer Strider	Atlanta Braves
2023	Gunnar Henderson	Baltimore Orioles	Corbin Carroll	Arizona Diamondbacks
2024	Colton Cowser	Baltimore Orioles	Jackson Merrill	San Diego Padres
2025	Nick Kurtz	Athletics	Drake Baldwin	Atlanta Braves
2026	Kevin McGonigle	Detroit Tigers	Sal Stewart	Cincinnati Reds

=== Comeback Player ===
In 1992, this was the first ever Players Choice Award. There were no other awards that year. The Comeback Player award was not given from 1993 to 1996, although awards were given in other categories. In 1997, it was again awarded and has been ever since.

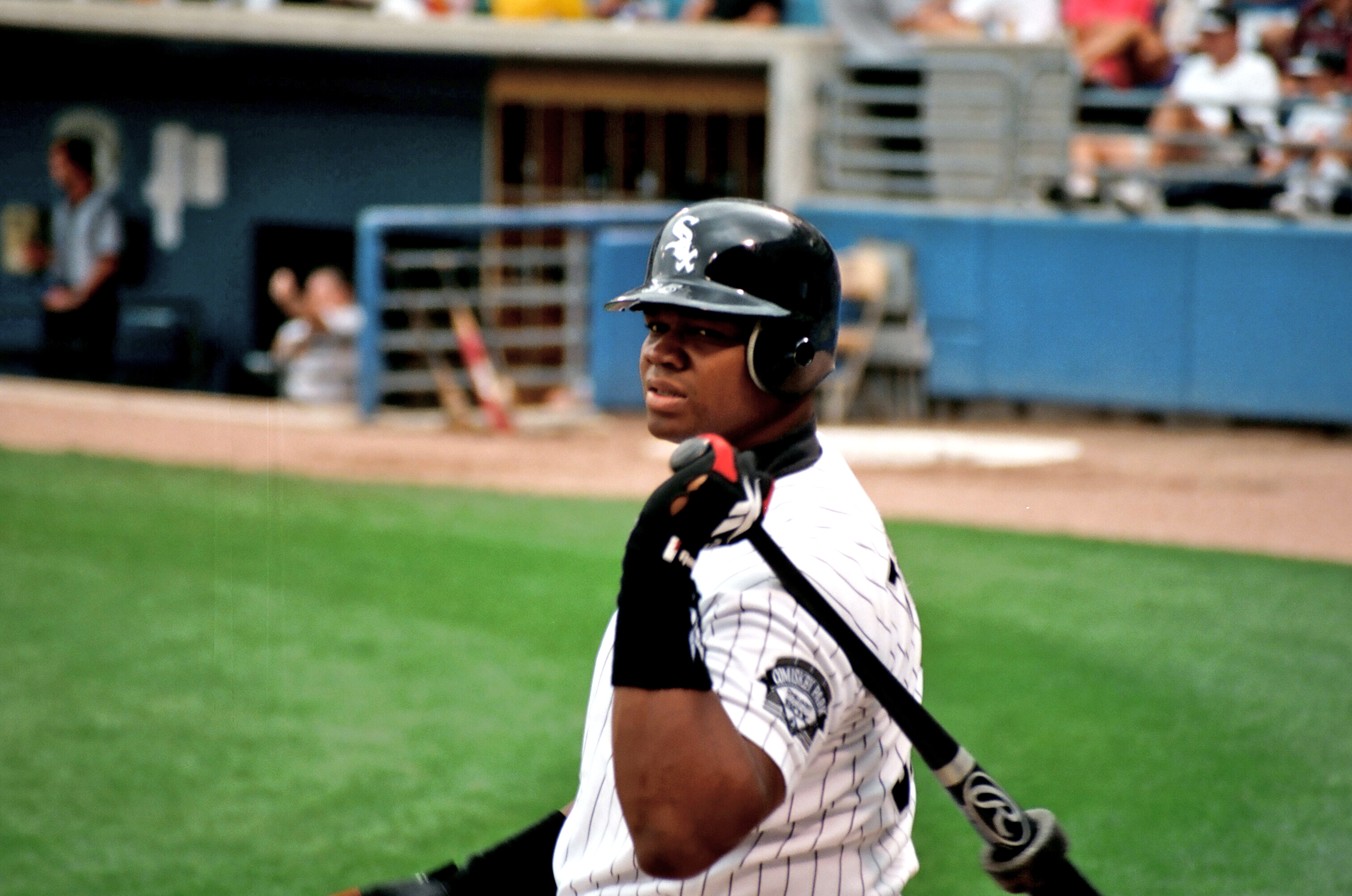
Frank Thomas won the Comeback Player of the Year Award twice.

Year	American League		National League	
Year	Player	Team	Player	Team
1992	Dennis Eckersley	Oakland Athletics	Barry Bonds	Pittsburgh Pirates
1997	David Justice	Cleveland Indians	Darren Daulton	Philadelphia Phillies
1998	Eric Davis	Baltimore Orioles	Greg Vaughn	San Diego Padres
1999	John Jaha	Oakland Athletics	Alex Fernandez	Florida Marlins
2000	Frank Thomas (1)	Chicago White Sox	Andrés Galarraga	Atlanta Braves
2001	Rubén Sierra	Texas Rangers	Matt Morris	St. Louis Cardinals
2002	Tim Salmon	Anaheim Angels	Mike Lieberthal; John Smoltz	Philadelphia Phillies; Atlanta Braves
2003	Esteban Loaiza	Chicago White Sox	Rod Beck	San Diego Padres
2004	Orlando Hernández	New York Yankees	Chris Carpenter (1)	St. Louis Cardinals
2005	Jason Giambi	New York Yankees	Ken Griffey Jr.	Cincinnati Reds
2006	Frank Thomas (2)	Oakland Athletics	Nomar Garciaparra	Los Angeles Dodgers
2007	Carlos Peña	Tampa Bay Devil Rays	Dmitri Young	Washington Nationals
2008	Cliff Lee	Cleveland Indians	Fernando Tatís	New York Mets
2009	Aaron Hill	Toronto Blue Jays	Chris Carpenter (2)	St. Louis Cardinals
2010	Vladimir Guerrero	Texas Rangers	Tim Hudson	Atlanta Braves
2011	Jacoby Ellsbury	Boston Red Sox	Lance Berkman	St. Louis Cardinals
2012	Adam Dunn	Chicago White Sox	Buster Posey	San Francisco Giants
2013	Mariano Rivera	New York Yankees	Francisco Liriano	Pittsburgh Pirates
2014	Chris Young	Seattle Mariners	Casey McGehee	Miami Marlins
2015	Prince Fielder	Texas Rangers	Matt Harvey	New York Mets
2016	Mark Trumbo	Baltimore Orioles	José Fernández	Miami Marlins
2017	Mike Moustakas	Kansas City Royals	Ryan Zimmerman	Washington Nationals
2018	Cameron Maybin	Seattle Mariners	Matt Kemp	Los Angeles Dodgers
2019	Hunter Pence	Texas Rangers	Josh Donaldson	Atlanta Braves
2020	Carlos Carrasco	Cleveland Indians	Daniel Bard	Colorado Rockies
2021	Trey Mancini	Baltimore Orioles	Buster Posey (2)	San Francisco Giants
2022	Justin Verlander	Houston Astros	Ronald Acuña Jr. (1)	Atlanta Braves
2023	Liam Hendriks	Chicago White Sox	Cody Bellinger	Chicago Cubs
2024	Tyler O'Neill	Boston Red Sox	Chris Sale	Atlanta Braves
2025	Jacob deGrom	Texas Rangers	Ronald Acuña Jr. (2)	Atlanta Braves
2026	Yordan Álvarez	Houston Astros	Zack Wheeler	Philadelphia Phillies

== Award for Player of the Decade ==
In 1999, a special Player of the Decade award was given to Ken Griffey Jr.

== See also ==
- Baseball America Major League Player of the Year (in MLB; for all positions)
- Best Major League Baseball Player ESPY Award (in MLB; for all positions)
- Sporting News Player of the Year Award (in MLB; for all positions) (Sporting News also has a Pitcher of the Year award for each league)
- The Sporting News Most Valuable Player Award (in each league) (discontinued in 1946)
- Baseball Digest Player of the Year (in MLB; for position players) (from 1969 to 1993, included all positions; in 1994, a separate Pitcher of the Year award was added)
- "Esurance MLB Awards" Best Major Leaguer (in MLB; for all positions) (there are also awards for Best Hitter and Best Pitcher)
- Kenesaw Mountain Landis Most Valuable Player Award (in each league; for all positions) (MLB also has the Cy Young Award for a pitcher in each league)
- Triple Crown (baseball)
- MLB All-Century Team (1999)
- MLB All-Time Team (1997; Baseball Writers' Association of America)
- Baseball awards
- List of MLB awards
