= Julio Rodríguez =

Dominican baseball player (born 2000)

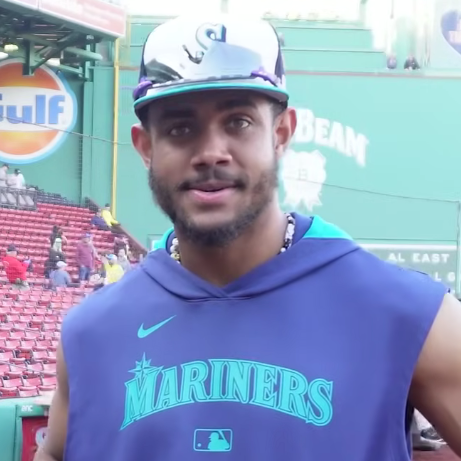
- Rodríguez with the Seattle Mariners in 2025

Seattle Mariners – No. 44
- Center fielder
- Born: December 29, 2000 (age 25); Loma de Cabrera, Dominican Republic
- Bats: Right Throws: Right

MLB debut
- April 8, 2022, for the Seattle Mariners

MLB statistics (through 2026 season)
- Batting average: .269
- Home runs: 134
- Runs batted in: 412
- Stolen bases: 138
- Stats at Baseball Reference

Teams
- Seattle Mariners (2022–present)

Career highlights and awards
- 3× All-Star (2022, 2023, 2025); All-MLB First Team (2025); AL Rookie of the Year (2022); 2× Silver Slugger Award (2022, 2023)
Medals
Men's baseball
Representing Dominican Republic
Olympic Games
Bronze medal – third place	2020 Tokyo	Team
World Baseball Classic
Bronze medal – third place	2026 Miami	Team

Julio Yamel Rodríguez (born December 29, 2000), nicknamed "J-Rod", is a Dominican professional baseball center fielder for the Seattle Mariners of Major League Baseball (MLB). He signed with the Mariners as an international free agent in 2017. In his rookie season in 2022, he was named an All-Star along with winning the Silver Slugger Award and American League Rookie of the Year Award. Rodríguez has been selected to three All-Star Games, won two Silver Sluggers, and made the All-MLB Second Team in 2022 and All-MLB Team in 2025.

== Early life ==
Rodríguez was born and raised in Loma de Cabrera, a town of 20,000 people in the Dominican Republic. While many MLB players are from the Dominican Republic, relatively few are from Loma de Cabrera, which is located near the border with Haiti. The most famous player from the town was Rafael Furcal.

Rodríguez's father was an agricultural engineer, his mother was a dentist, and he has three siblings. At ten years old, he began competing in a local baseball league with children three to four years older than himself. His father began coaching him at 12 years old, training him to play catcher because of his build. When he had a growth spurt the following year, he moved to the outfield. He first caught the attention of scouts when, at only 12 years old, he hit a ball to the outfield wall against a hard-throwing 17-year-old pitcher in a local tournament. When he was 14, Rodríguez left his family for a baseball academy in Santiago de Los Caballeros. The Mariners discovered him at his tryout for the academy in Santiago.

== Professional career ==
=== Minor leagues ===
Rodríguez signed as an international free agent with the Seattle Mariners as a 16 year old in July 2017, receiving a $1.75 million signing bonus. He made his professional debut with the Rookie-level Dominican Summer League Mariners in 2018, playing primarily right field and batting .315/.404/.525 with 50 runs, nine triples (tied for the league lead), five home runs, 36 RBI, and 10 stolen bases without being caught in 59 games. He was named both a DSL mid-season All-Star and a Baseball America DSL All-Star. He ended the season with a foot injury, and he traveled to Arizona for additional treatment.

Rodríguez started 2019 with the Class-A West Virginia Power in the South Atlantic League. He missed almost two months of the season with a fractured left hand. He was promoted to the Class A-Advanced Modesto Nuts in the California League in August, becoming one of only three 18-year-olds to play in High-A ball in 2019. He was more than three years younger than the average player in both leagues. Rodríguez played in the Arizona Fall League for the Peoria Javelinas after the 2019 regular season. As the youngest player in the league, he hit .288/.397/.365 in 63 plate appearances. He was named an AFL Rising Star.

In 2020, with the minor league season canceled, Rodríguez was ticketed for the Mariners alternate training site in Tacoma, but he broke his left wrist during a workout in July. He later participated in the fall instructional league in Arizona, then played 18 games for Leones del Escogido in the Dominican winter league, batting just .196 against much older competition. He also began training with former football player Yo Murphy to improve his speed, allowing him to play center field and steal more bases. In the minors, Rodríguez played mostly as a right fielder and did not steal more than 10 bases in a season before 2021.

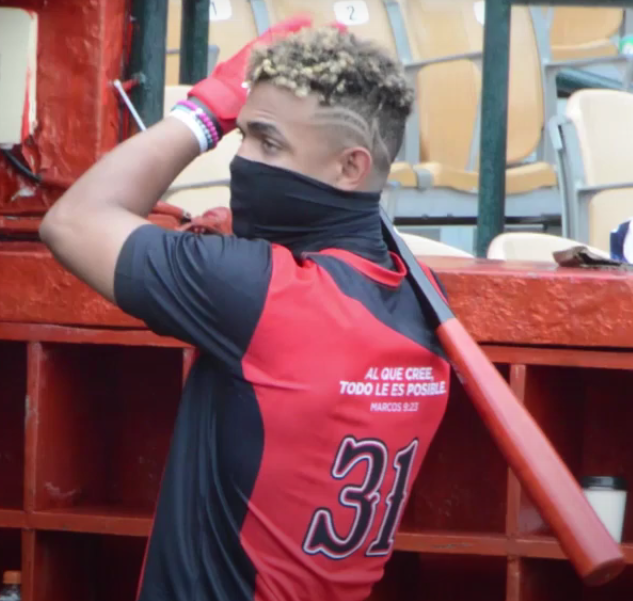
Rodríguez with the Leones del Escogido in 2020

Rodríguez started 2021 with the Everett AquaSox. In June, he was promoted to the Double-A Arkansas Travelers. Rodríguez was selected to play in the All-Star Futures Game. In August, he was ranked as the best Mariners prospect and the second-best prospect in baseball by MLB.com. He missed almost a month of the minor league season due to his participation in the Summer Olympics. In 74 games in 2021, Rodríguez hit .347/.441/.560 with 13 home runs and 21 stolen bases. The Mariners added him to their 40-man roster on November 18 to protect him from the Rule 5 draft. After the season, he was a consensus top 3 prospect.

=== 2022 season: Rookie of the Year ===
The Mariners named Rodríguez their Opening Day center fielder on April 4, 2022. He was the second-youngest major leaguer to start the season. He debuted in the majors on April 8 against the Minnesota Twins. After starting the season 1-for-21 with 12 strikeouts, Rodríguez took off. On May 1, he hit his first career home run, a three-run shot off Miami Marlins ace Sandy Alcántara. Rodríguez was named American League (AL) Rookie of the Month consecutively for May and June. In 29 games in June, he scored 22 runs and hit .280/.361/.542 with seven home runs, 16 RBI, and five stolen bases.

Rodríguez was selected for the MLB All-Star Game, the sixth Mariner rookie to play in an All-Star Game. He also participated in the Home Run Derby, where he hit 81 home runs across three rounds, besting Corey Seager and Pete Alonso before losing in the final round to Juan Soto. He kept up his great performance in July, during a stretch in which the Mariners won 14 consecutive games and jumped into playoff contention. On July 15, he hit his first career grand slam to put a game against the Texas Rangers out of reach. In July, he hit .267/.337/.547 with five home runs, 18 RBI, and two steals. He did not win Rookie of the Month in July, which went to Jose Miranda.

On August 23, Rodríguez hit his 20th home run, making him the sixth player in Mariners history to join the 20–20 club and the fourth player in MLB history to have 20 homers and 20 steals in their first MLB season. On September 11, he hit a game-tying home run off Kenley Jansen of the Atlanta Braves with a 117.2 mph exit velocity, the ninth hardest hit homer of the season. On September 14, he became the first player to join the 25–25 club in his debut season. September was Rodríguez's best month, as he hit .394 with 7 home runs in 19 games.

In 2022, Rodríguez batted .284/.345/.509 with 84 runs, 28 home runs, 75 RBI, 25 steals, and 140 strikeouts in 560 plate appearances. In his first professional season playing primarily in center fielder, he led AL outfielders in both range factor per game and errors (6). He tied for ninth in MLB in steals and was the 16th fastest baserunner. At 21 years old, he was the youngest qualified batter in the majors. Rodríguez won the Silver Slugger Award and the AL Rookie of the Year Award. He was named to the All-MLB Second Team.

==== Postseason ====
Rodríguez led the Mariners to their first postseason appearance since 2001, at the time the longest active playoff drought amongst the four major North American sports leagues. He led off all five Mariners postseason games, collecting five hits, three walks, and two hit by pitches in 28 plate appearances. He was hit by an Alek Manoah pitch to lead off Game 1 of the AL Wild Card Series against the Toronto Blue Jays, coming around to score the first run of a 4–0 win. Manoah hit Rodríguez again in the fifth inning of that game. Only five other players have been hit twice during a Wild Card game.

Rodríguez's best game in October was Game 1 of the AL Division Series (ALDS), when he hit a triple and a double, scoring three times in a loss to the Houston Astros. He and Brandon Nimmo were the only players to hit a triple in the postseason. In Game 3, Rodríguez made two difficult catches to prevent the Astros from scoring but was only 1-for-7 and made the final out in Seattle's 18-inning home loss.

==== Contract extension ====
On August 26, Rodríguez signed a long-term contract extension with Seattle. The contract lasts at least 8 years and, depending a team option in 2028 and a potential player option in 2030, that could last up to 14 years and be worth $470 million. Rodríguez's minimum guaranteed earnings on the contract are $209 million, though he could opt out in 2030 if the team declines its option. The contract includes a no-trade clause and bonuses for winning awards. It raised his 2023 salary from a minimum of $720,000 to $21 million, including a signing bonus.

=== 2023: All-Star, 30–30 club ===
On April 7, 2023, Rodríguez hit a tiebreaking two-run home run in the sixth inning against the Cleveland Guardians. He became the fastest player in Mariners history to 30 home runs, doing so in 140 games. In July, he was named to the All-Star Game for the second consecutive season. On July 10, he hit 41 homers in the first round of the Home Run Derby against Pete Alonso, breaking the Derby record for most home runs in a single round.

In August, Rodríguez went on a tear at the plate that matched or surpassed marks not achieved since the early 20th century. From August 16–19, he broke the MLB record for most hits in a four-game span with 17, the most since at least 1901. During those four games, Rodríguez went 17-for-22, hit 2 home runs, recorded 8 RBIs, and stole 5 bases. He had 28 hits in 10 games, a number not reached since Kenny Lofton in 1997. During that 10-game stretch, Rodríguez had five four-hit games, a feat that had not happened since 1900. He had five four-hit games in August; only Ty Cobb, with six such games in 1921, had more in a month. He won the AL Player of the Month Award.

In early September, Rodríguez became the first player in MLB history to hit 25 home runs and steal 25 bases in his first two seasons. On September 11, he hit his 30th home run of the season, making him the 44th player to join MLB's 30–30 club.

In 2023, Rodríguez batted .275/.333/.485 with 32 home runs. He led the AL with 29 infield hits, was second with 180 hits, second with 37 stolen bases, third with 103 RBIs, and tied for third with 175 strikeouts. He won his second consecutive Silver Slugger Award and was a finalist for the AL Gold Glove Award in center field. He finished fourth place in AL Most Valuable Player voting. That MVP result added $40 million to a potential team option beginning in 2030.

=== 2024 ===
Rodríguez had his worst offensive season in 2024, batting .273/.325/.409 with 20 home runs and 24 stolen bases. He and Bobby Witt Jr. became the first two players to have 20 home runs and 20 steals in the first three seasons of their MLB career. Rodríguez missed several weeks in July and August after suffering a high ankle sprain crashing into the center field wall, limiting him to the designated hitter role for nine games after returning from the injured list. He had a strong final month of the season, batting .328 with seven home runs and six steals in September, which he credited to hitting coach Edgar Martínez, who re-joined the team's coaching staff in late August after the firing of manager Scott Servais. He was named the AL Player of the Week for the week of September 15–21.

=== 2025: All-MLB, 30–30 club ===
Rodríguez hit a decisive grand slam in a win over the Chicago White Sox on May 19, 2025. In July, he was named to the All-Star Game, but chose not to play and was replaced by teammate Randy Arozarena. As in prior seasons, Rodríguez hit much better in the second half. On August 3, he hit his 100th career home run, which also made him the first player to begin his MLB career with four consecutive 20–20 seasons. He hit two home runs on September 6, beginning a win streak that led to Seattle winning the AL West. He stole two bases on September 27, joining the 30–30 club for the second time.

Rodríguez finished the regular season batting .267/.324/.474 with 32 home runs and 30 stolen bases. He led the AL in plate appearances and at bats. He was named to the All-MLB Team and finished sixth in AL MVP voting. He was a finalist for the Gold Glove for the second time, losing to Cedanne Rafaela. He led AL center fielders in games played, putouts, and total zone runs. However, he trailed Rafaela and three others in defensive runs saved.

==== Postseason ====
Rodríguez homered in Game 1 of the ALDS and drove in the winning run in Game 2. After 4 hits over those two games, he went 0-for-14 with 2 walks in the final three games of the series, which Seattle won.

In the AL Championship Series, Rodríguez scored the go-ahead run in Game 1, with a single and two walks in the game. He hit a three-run home run in the first inning of Game 2, a lopsided 10–3 win. He also walked once and struck out three times. He homered again in the first inning of Game 3, later hitting a single in the Mariners first loss of the series. In the decisive Game 7, he hit a solo home run and a double as Seattle lost 4–3 to the Blue Jays. Rodríguez was the final out of the game, swinging at a pitch off the plate from Jeff Hoffman. Rodríguez batted .208/.309/.500 in 12 postseason games, and his 34.5 percent strikeout rate was one of the highest in the majors.

=== 2026 ===
Rodríguez, a slow starter in prior seasons, had a poor first two weeks to begin the 2026 season, batting 7-for-49, but then got out to the best start in his career. He hit ten home runs in May, the most in any month in his career. On September 3, Rodríguez stole three bases to become the first player in MLB history to begin his career with five consecutive 20–20 seasons.

== International career ==
Rodríguez played for the Dominican Republic national team in the 2020 Summer Olympics and in the World Baseball Classic (WBC). He also played in two qualifying tournaments in 2021 before the Olympics. He hit 11-for-24 in the Americas qualifying tournament, with two home runs against Venezuela and later had a game-winning RBI single against Canada. Dominican manager Hector Borg called Rodríguez the best player at the tournament. Rodríguez was 1-for-10 as the Dominicans won all three games of the final qualifying tournament in Puebla, Mexico.

Rodríguez was one of the top hitters at the Olympics, held in Tokyo in 2021. He hit .417 with a 1.069 on-base plus slugging in 6 games, tying for third in total bases in the tournament. In the bronze medal game, he hit a two-run home run in the first inning, adding a double, walk, and hit by pitch to help defeat South Korea 10–6 and win his country's first medal in baseball. After the game, Rodríguez said, "We as Dominicans are characterized by baseball. So being here right now is very special, being able to win a medal for the country... It really means the world to me."

Rodríguez and his country were not as successful against tougher competition in the 2023 WBC. In four games, he went 5-for-18 with one double and nine strikeouts. He hit a single and struck out three times in an elimination game loss to Puerto Rico on March 15. In that game, he misplayed a line drive hit by Francisco Lindor, allowing Lindor to score on the play. Rodríguez later had an outfield assist, throwing out Kiké Hernandez at third base from deep right field.

In the 2026 WBC, Rodríguez hit a home run against Nicaragua. He robbed a potential Aaron Judge home run in a semifinal loss to the United States. In five games, Rodríguez hit .176 with three walks.

== Popularity and personality ==
Rodríguez adopted his "J-Rod" nickname in honor of former Mariner Alex Rodriguez.

Rodríguez began studying English at the insistence of his mother and began posting text and videos in English with his hashtag and nickname "#JRodShow" while he was in the minor leagues. He began conducting interviews with reporters in English, rather than his native Spanish, in 2018. In February 2021, then-Mariners president Kevin Mather spoke to a Seattle-area Rotary club and, among his negative comments about Mariners players, said Rodríguez's English was "not tremendous." Rodríguez responded on Twitter, in English, with a meme stating he took Mather's comments personally. Mather resigned the next day.

Rodríguez was featured on the packaging and advertising of Topps baseball cards in 2023.

In 2023, the Mariners started a fan section for Rodríguez, called the "J-Rod Squad," in three sections behind him in center field.

Rodríguez appeared in a Mariners television commercial with Ichiro Suzuki in 2024. The two outfielders became throwing partners in 2020, when Suzuki, also a Rookie of the Year winner, was a Mariners special assistant and more than twice Rodríguez's age.

Fox Sports produced a documentary on Rodríguez, called "Welcome to the J-Rod Show," which first aired on FS1 on July 16, 2024, following the MLB All-Star Game.

== Personal life ==
Rodríguez says he's motivated by anime. In his childhood, he would run home from school to watch Naruto. As a rookie, he wore a chain featuring title character Naruto Uzumaki on the reverse as a reminder to never give up and, "always see the bright side of things."

Rodríguez began dating Canadian professional soccer player and fellow 2020 Olympic medalist Jordyn Huitema in September 2022. On May 1, 2025, burglars stole almost $200,000 of belongings from their home on Mercer Island. Rodríguez was traveling with the Mariners during the home invasion. Huitema, home at the time, barricaded herself in a bathroom during the incident. The two have since split, unfollowing each other on social media and removing their posts that feature each other.

In January 2023, Rodríguez donated an ambulance to his hometown of Loma de Cabrera, which until then did not have an ambulance. He also gave baseball equipment and toys to the children in his hometown. Rodríguez created a personal foundation, the No Limits Foundation, in 2024, which organized a toy drive for children in Loma de Cabrera and the Seattle area in late 2024.

== Awards and honors ==
- 2× Silver Slugger Award (American League (AL) outfielder, 2022–23)
- Rookie of the Year Award (AL, 2022)
- All-MLB First Team (outfielder, 2025)
- All-MLB Second Team (outfielder, 2022)
- 3x MLB All-Star (2022, 2024, 2025)
- AL Player of the Month (August 2023)
- Players Choice Award for AL Outstanding Rookie (2022)
- 2x AL Rookie of the Month (May and June, 2022)
- 4x AL Player of the Week (June 26–July 2, 2022, May 21–27 and August 13–19, 2023, September 15–21, 2024)

== See also ==
- List of Major League Baseball players from the Dominican Republic
- List of Olympic medalists in baseball
- List of Silver Slugger Award winners at outfield
- Seattle Mariners award winners and league leaders

Awards and achievements
Preceded by Randy Arozarena	American League Rookie of the Year; 2022	Succeeded by Gunnar Henderson
Preceded by Shohei Ohtani	American League Player of the Month; August 2023	Succeeded by Yordan Alvarez
