= Ed Vande Berg =

American baseball player (born 1958)

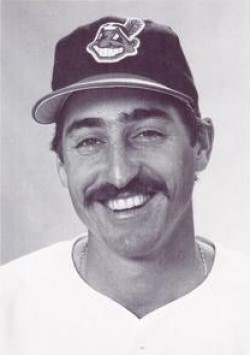
- Vande Berg with Cleveland in 1987
- Pitcher
- Born: October 26, 1958 (age 67); Redlands, California, U.S.
- Batted: Right Threw: Left

MLB debut
- April 7, 1982, for the Seattle Mariners

Last MLB appearance
- September 30, 1988, for the Texas Rangers

MLB statistics
- Win–loss record: 25–28
- Earned run average: 3.92
- Strikeouts: 314
- Stats at Baseball Reference

Teams
- Seattle Mariners (1982–1985); Los Angeles Dodgers (1986); Cleveland Indians (1987); Texas Rangers (1988)
Medals
Men's baseball
Representing United States
Amateur World Series
Silver medal – second place	1978 Italy	Team

Edward John Vande Berg (born October 26, 1958) is an American former professional baseball pitcher who played seven seasons in Major League Baseball (MLB).

== Playing career ==
Vande Berg graduated from Redlands High School in Redlands, California, in 1976 then attended San Bernardino Valley College, with a 18–1 record across 1977 and 1978. He then transferred to Arizona State University. He played on the U.S. national team that finished second in the 1978 Amateur World Series in Italy.

The Seattle Mariners selected Vande Berg in the 13th round of the 1980 MLB draft. He signed for a $1,000 signing bonus, which he spent on car tires. He converted to a relief pitcher role in Triple-A in 1981. Vande Berg made his MLB debut with the Mariners on April 7, 1982. He worked mostly as a setup man to Bill Caudill, finishing his rookie season with a 9–4 record and 2.37 earned run average (ERA) while leading the American League (AL) with 78 games pitched, which was a major league rookie record until 1986. He was named the AL Rookie Pitcher of the Year by the Sporting News, the left-handed pitcher on the Topps All-Star Rookie Team, and finished fourth in AL Rookie of the Year voting. He did not match any of those marks in subsequent seasons, and his slider was not as effective. He was second in the league in pitching appearances in 1983, then split 1983 between being a reliever and starting pitcher, going 8–12 with a career-high 7 saves. He was again second in the AL in appearances in 1985. After four seasons in Seattle, he held the franchise record with 272 games pitched, and his 3.72 ERA was tied for the lowest with Floyd Bannister.

Seattle traded Vande Berg to the Los Angeles Dodgers for Steve Yeager on December 11, 1985. Vande Berg agreed to a $455,000 salary ahead of the 1986 season, second-highest among Dodgers relievers, as well as a drug-testing clause. The Dodgers non-tendered him after the season.

Vande Berg pitched for the Cleveland Indians in 1987 and Texas Rangers in 1988. He appeared in his final MLB game on September 30, 1988. Texas released him in March 1989. He pitched in Triple-A through 1992. He was a replacement player with the San Francisco Giants in spring training in 1995 during the ongoing players strike. He pitched one game for the Dubois County Dragons in 1998.

== Personal life ==
Vande Berg married his wife in 1980. They have three children.

Vande Berg's father, who moved from Wisconsin to California, regularly coached Vande Berg's youth baseball teams.
