= Mike Cameron =

American baseball player (born 1973)

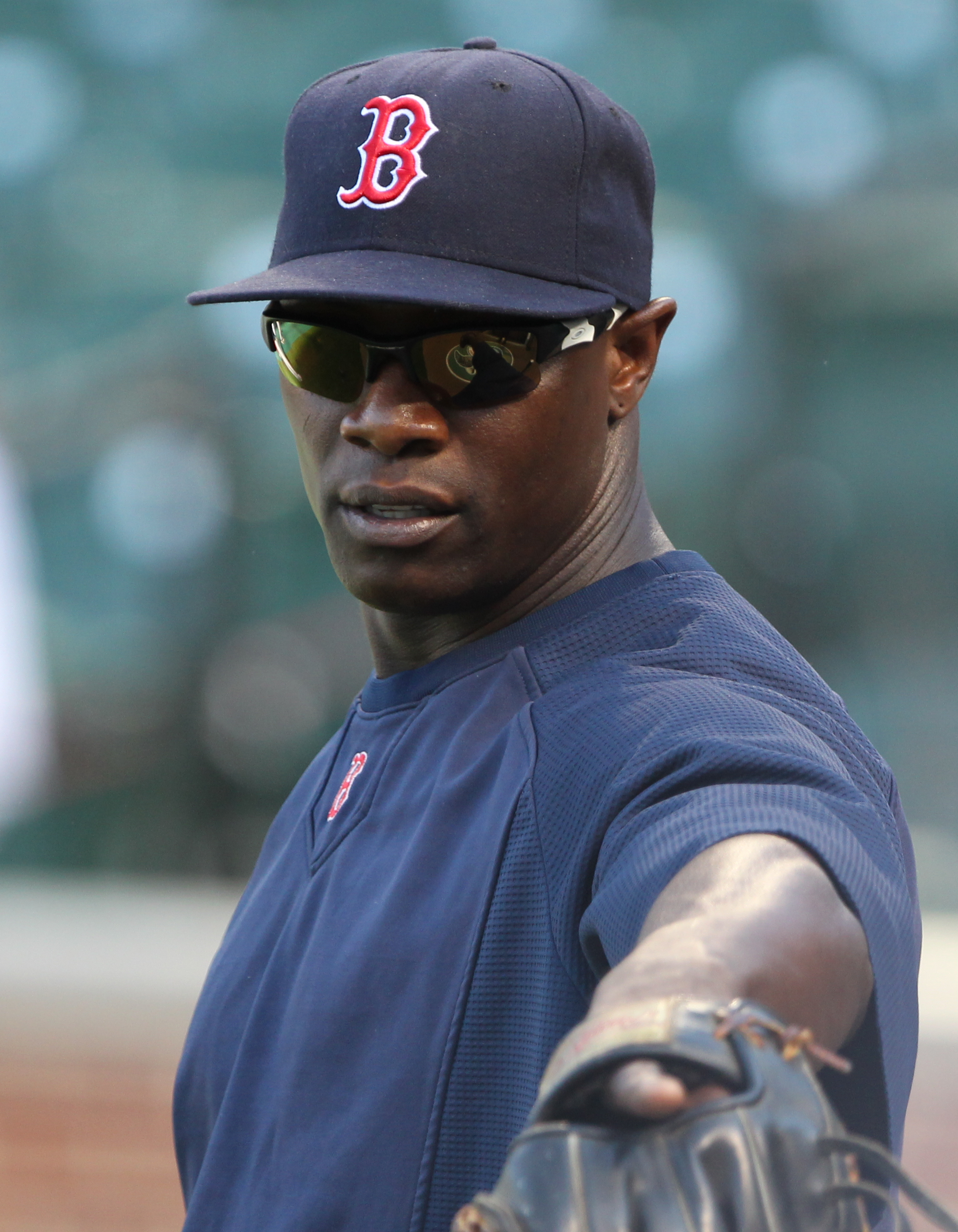
- Cameron with the Red Sox in 2011
- Center fielder
- Born: January 8, 1973 (age 53); LaGrange, Georgia, U.S.
- Batted: Right Threw: Right

MLB debut
- August 27, 1995, for the Chicago White Sox

Last MLB appearance
- September 12, 2011, for the Florida Marlins

MLB statistics
- Batting average: .249
- Home runs: 278
- Runs batted in: 968
- Stats at Baseball Reference

Teams
- Chicago White Sox (1995–1998); Cincinnati Reds (1999); Seattle Mariners (2000–2003); New York Mets (2004–2005); San Diego Padres (2006–2007); Milwaukee Brewers (2008–2009); Boston Red Sox (2010–2011); Florida Marlins (2011)

Career highlights and awards
- All-Star (2001); 3× Gold Glove Award (2001, 2003, 2006); Hit four home runs in one game on May 2, 2002

Michael Terrance Cameron (born January 8, 1973) is an American former professional Major League Baseball outfielder. He played for the Chicago White Sox, Cincinnati Reds, Seattle Mariners, New York Mets, San Diego Padres, Milwaukee Brewers, Boston Red Sox, and Florida Marlins over a 17-year career and is currently the special assignment coach for the Seattle Mariners.

In 2002, Cameron became the 13th player to hit four home runs in one game. He was also an All-Star in 2001 and won Gold Gloves in 2001, 2003, and 2006. Cameron has distinguished himself by being only one of 25 players in the history of baseball to have at least 250 home runs and 250 stolen bases and became the 20th member of this exclusive 250/250 club. Cameron is also the only MLB player to hit two home runs in the same game with eight different teams.

== Early life ==
Cameron was born in LaGrange, Georgia, and raised on Render Street by his grandmother; he moved into her house when he was seven years old to keep her company after her husband died. Cameron attended LaGrange High School. His grandmother kept him from playing baseball as a high school junior because he failed a chemistry class. As a result, he drew less attention from scouts. He played football in high school with future National Football League player Walt Harris.

== Playing career ==
=== Chicago White Sox ===
Cameron was drafted out of high school in the 18th round by the Chicago White Sox in 1991. In 1994, he set a Carolina League record with 17 triples. His major league debut took place on August 27, 1995, and he collected his first hit on August 30, off C. J. Nitkowski. He hit his first home run off Jason Jacome of the Kansas City Royals on September 27.

Cameron returned to the minors to start the 1996 season. He led the Southern League in runs, stolen bases, and slugging percentage and was a mid-season and postseason All-Star. League managers named him the most exciting player. He returned to the majors for one game in August, then played in 10 games as a September call-up. Over his first two partial seasons in the majors, he had a .163 batting average in 39 games.

In 1997, Cameron won the starting center fielder job. On June 27, he robbed Roberto Kelly of the Minnesota Twins of what would have been a go-ahead home run. Cameron finished sixth in American League (AL) Rookie of the Year Award voting, leading league rookies in walks and steals. He hit .259 with 14 home runs in his first full season in the majors, striking out 105 times.

Cameron's offense dipped in 1999, batting .210 with eight home runs.

=== Cincinnati Reds ===
The White Sox traded Cameron to the Cincinnati Reds for Paul Konerko on November 11, 1998. In his sole season with Cincinnati, Cameron batted .256 with 25 home runs with career highs of 38 steals and 80 walks.

=== Seattle Mariners ===
The Reds traded Cameron, Brett Tomko, Antonio Pérez, and Jake Meyer to the Seattle Mariners for Ken Griffey Jr. on February 10, 2000. Replacing Griffey in center field, Cameron robbed Derek Jeter of a home run in his first week with the new team, which Mariners broadcaster Dave Niehaus called "Griffey-esque", then "Cameron-esque". Cameron hit .267 with a career-high .365 on-base percentage in his first season with Seattle, making his first postseason appearance. In 2001, he was selected to his only MLB All-Star Game, won his first Gold Glove Award, and returned to the postseason as the Mariners tied an MLB record with 116 wins.

Cameron tied a major league record on May 2, 2002, when he hit four home runs in one game, becoming the 13th player in MLB history to do so. His first two home runs both came in the game's first inning, each following a home run by Bret Boone, making them the first teammates in MLB history to hit back-to-back home runs twice in the same inning. his fifth at bat, Cameron hit a line drive to the warning track, just missing what would have been a record-setting fifth home run. During the game, he also robbed Magglio Ordóñez of the Chicago White Sox of what would have been a grand slam. In 2002, Cameron led the AL with 176 strikeouts, the most of his career.

In April 22, 2003, Cameron hit a walk-off grand slam off Danys Báez of the Cleveland Indians. In his final season with the Mariners, Cameron won his second Gold Glove and led MLB center fielders in range factor (3.42).

=== New York Mets ===
On December 23, 2003, Cameron signed a three-year, $19.5 million contract with the New York Mets. In his first season with the Mets, Cameron hit a career-high 30 home runs.

With the acquisition by the Mets of Carlos Beltrán before the 2005 season, Cameron ceded his position to the future Hall of Famer and played mostly in right field during the 2005 season. On August 11 in San Diego, Cameron collided with Beltrán in the outfield as both made diving attempts to catch a fly ball. Cameron suffered a concussion and multiple fractures of his nose and cheekbones and was removed from the field on a stretcher. Beltrán also suffered a concussion but was able to walk off the field with help.

=== San Diego Padres ===
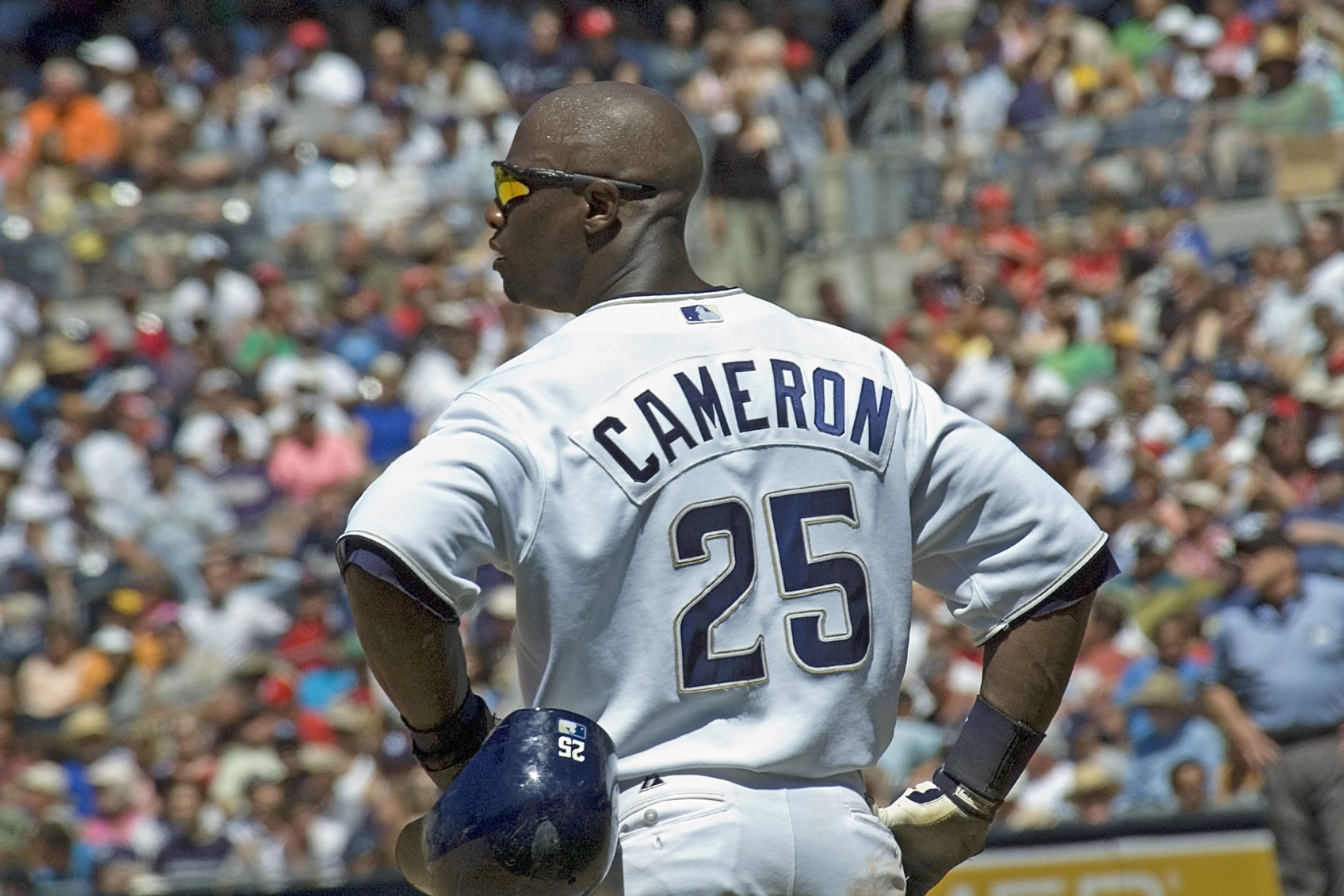
Cameron with the Padres in 2006.

On November 15, 2005, the Mets traded Cameron to the San Diego Padres for Xavier Nady. Cameron won a National League (NL) Gold Glove Award in 2006.

After leaving the Mariners in 2004 via free agency, Cameron played his first game back in Seattle during interleague play in May 2006. Mariners fans greeted his return with a standing ovation.

On October 31, 2007, it was announced that Cameron had failed a test for banned stimulants for a second time and would miss the first 25 games of the 2008 season. Cameron said that he believes that a supplement he took was tainted. However, given the requirement of two failed drug tests before an announcement is made, this explanation is questionable. He was the second major leaguer to be suspended for a second positive test for stimulants, following Neifi Pérez.

=== Milwaukee Brewers ===
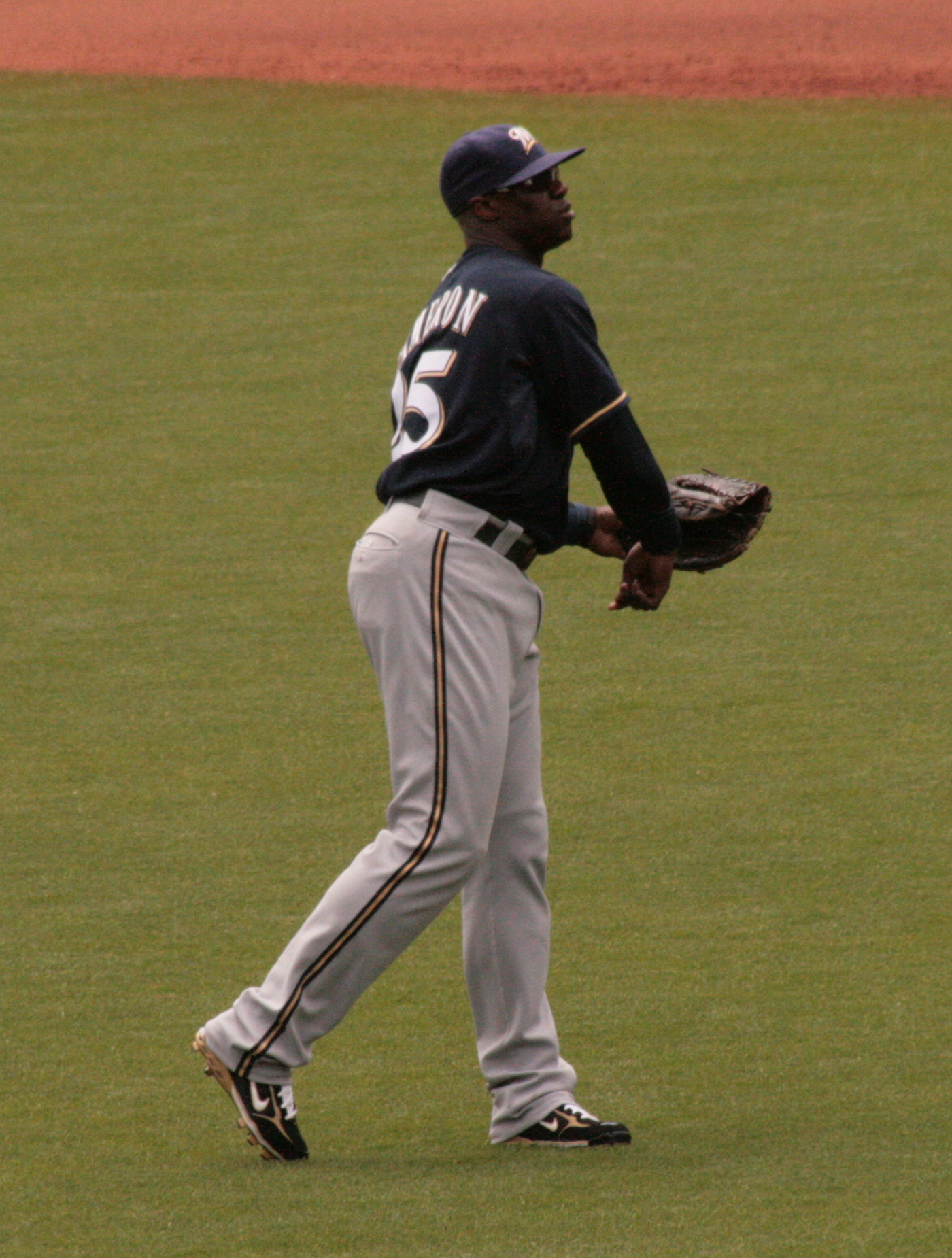
Cameron with the Brewers in 2008.

On January 14, 2008, Cameron signed a one-year contract with the Milwaukee Brewers. On March 13, he applied for a therapeutic exemption to use stimulants during the 2008 season because of his 2005 outfield collision with Beltrán. He claimed to be struggling with after-effects of the collision that ended his 2005 season. If he had applied for the exemption in 2007, he could have avoided the 25-game suspension he had to serve to begin this season for testing positive for a banned stimulant for the second time. He also told USA Today that he would see a neurologist to determine if he was suffering from post-concussion syndrome. If the exemption were granted, Cameron could have been permitted to use some amphetamines banned by MLB's drug policy.

Cameron debuted with Milwaukee in late April, after serving his suspension. In November, the Brewers picked up his club option for the 2009 season. On May 24, 2009, Cameron hit his 250th career home run against the Minnesota Twins, becoming the 20th player to hit 250 home runs and steal 250 bases in MLB history. Over two seasons in Milwaukee, he batted .247 with 49 home runs. He finished in the top eight in the NL in strikeouts in both seasons and led NL outfielders in putouts in 2009.

=== Boston Red Sox ===
On December 16, 2009, Cameron signed a two-year, $15.5 million contract with the Boston Red Sox. He missed most of the 2010 season with a groin injury, going on the injured list in early August. He hit four home runs in 48 games.

Cameron made 70 plate appearances for Boston in 2011, batting .143, before being designated for assignment on June 29.

=== Florida Marlins ===
On July 5, 2011, Cameron was traded to the Florida Marlins for a player to be named later or cash considerations. He was released on September 13.

=== Retirement ===
On December 19, 2011, Cameron agreed to a minor league deal with the Washington Nationals. However, he announced his retirement on February 19, 2012, before the start of spring training. Cameron signed a one-day contract with Seattle on April 14, to officially retire as a Mariner before throwing out the ceremonial first pitch at the Mariners' home opener that day.

On April 26, 2019, Cameron returned to the Mariners as a special assignment coach.

== Player profile ==
Cameron was a good defensive outfielder, winning three Gold Glove Awards as a center fielder during his peak. Offensively, he was a power–speed player, one of 16 MLB players with at least 270 home runs and 290 stolen bases. He was also a three true outcomes hitter: in addition to his home runs, he struck out more than 130 times in 10 seasons and walked in 11 percent of plate appearances, well above the MLB average during his career. From 1997–2009, he ranked second in strikeouts, 14th in walks, and 24th in home runs.

Cameron did not receive any votes in 2017 Baseball Hall of Fame balloting. He was named one of the 50 greatest Mariners players in August 2026. That September, the Mariners unveiled a statue featuring Cameron and Mark McLemore, honoring the 2001 Mariners clinching the AL West title and carrying an American flag following the team's first game after the September 11th attacks.

Cameron, nicknamed "Cammy", was known as a good teammate, developing friendships with Ichiro Suzuki and Cliff Floyd.

== Personal life ==
Cameron, with Greg Brown and Robin Roberts, wrote a book (aimed primarily at children) titled It Takes a Team: Mike Cameron, where he presents his views on the importance of teamwork and describes his life. It was published in 2002.

After being selected to the AL All-Star Team in 2001, Cameron used his salary bonus to purchase All-Star Game warm-up jackets for all his Seattle teammates. During his playing career he was known for routinely sitting on top of the dugout to sign autographs and talk with fans before games. He is the founder of the Cam4Kids Foundation and was host of the First State Golf Tournament for Inner City Kids in Seattle in 2002; these in effort to raise money to provide scholarships to inner-city youth. He was also involved with the Make-A-Wish Foundation and Starlight Foundation.

Cameron married a former high school classmate in or around 1999. They have four children. Their son, Daz Cameron, played baseball at Eagle's Landing Christian Academy. He was drafted 37th overall by the Houston Astros in the 2015 MLB draft and has played for several MLB teams from 2020 to 2026. Another son played college basketball for the Tennessee Tech Golden Eagles, and a daughter ran track in college for the Ole Miss Rebels.

== See also ==
- List of Major League Baseball career home run leaders
- List of Major League Baseball single-game home run leaders
- List of second-generation Major League Baseball players
- List of doping cases in sport

Achievements
Preceded by Mark Whiten	Batters with 4 home runs in one game May 2, 2002	Succeeded by Shawn Green
