= 2024 Seattle Mariners season =

2024 Seattle Mariners
- League: American League
- Division: West
- Ballpark: T-Mobile Park
- City: Seattle, Washington
- Record: 85–77 (.525)
- Divisional place: 2nd
- Owner: Baseball Club of Seattle, LP, represented by CEO John Stanton
- President of baseball operations: Jerry Dipoto
- Managers: Scott Servais (until August 22); Dan Wilson (from August 22)
- Average attendance: 31,553
- Television: Root Sports Northwest (Dave Sims, Aaron Goldsmith, Mike Blowers, Gary Hill Jr., Jay Buhner, Bill Krueger, Jen Mueller)
- Radio: ESPN-710; Seattle Mariners Radio Network (Rick Rizzs, Aaron Goldsmith, Dave Sims, Shannon Drayer)

The 2024 Seattle Mariners season was the 48th season in franchise history. The Mariners played their 25th full season (26th overall) at T-Mobile Park, their home ballpark in Seattle, Washington. The season opened on March 28 at home against the Boston Red Sox and ended on September 29 at home against the Oakland Athletics.

On June 19, the Mariners held a ten game lead in the American League (AL) West. However, their weak offense (which finished with a batting average of .224) began to take its toll. By July 24, they blew their division lead and began to fall out of playoff position entirely. On August 22, the Mariners dismissed manager Scott Servais following struggles by the team. The team named former catcher Dan Wilson as their new manager. Despite going 16–10 in September, the Mariners were eliminated from playoff contention for the second consecutive season, following wins by the Kansas City Royals and Detroit Tigers on September 26 and 27, respectively.

Pitchers Logan Gilbert and Andrés Muñoz represented Seattle in the MLB All-Star Game. Muñoz replaced Gilbert, who was unable to pitch due to a scheduled start days before the game.

== Offseason ==
The Mariners finished the 2023 season in third place in the AL West. The team's efforts to improve the team were financially hampered by a decision by Comcast to remove the team's regional sports network, Root Sports Northwest, from many customers' cable television plans. In a salary-saving move, starting pitcher Robbie Ray was traded to the San Francisco Giants for former Seattle outfielder Mitch Haniger. Finances also contributed to the trade of former top prospect Jarred Kelenic as well as Marco Gonzales and Evan White, both of whom had long-term contracts and injury issues, to the Atlanta Braves for pitchers Jackson Kowar and Cole Phillips. The team also traded Eugenio Suárez to the Arizona Diamondbacks and did not extend a qualifying offer to Teoscar Hernández.

The Mariners most significant free agent signing was designated hitter/catcher Mitch Garver, who agreed to a two-year, $24 million contract. Through trades, the team acquired starters Jorge Polanco and Luis Urías as well as relief pitchers Gregory Santos and Carlos Vargas.

=== Transactions ===
- November 17, 2023 – Acquired infielder Luis Urías from the Boston Red Sox in exchange for right-handed relief pitcher Isaiah Campbell.
- November 22 – Acquired RHP Carlos Vargas and C Seby Zavala from the Arizona Diamondbacks in exchange for 3B Eugenio Suárez.
- December 3 – Acquired RHP Cole Phillips and RHP Jackson Kowar from the Atlanta Braves in exchange for LHP Marco Gonzales, OF Jarred Kelenic, and 1B Evan White.
- December 28 – C Mitch Garver signed a two-year, $24 million contract.
- January 5, 2024 – Acquired RF Mitch Haniger, RHP Anthony DeSclafani, and cash from the San Francisco Giants in exchange for LHP Robbie Ray.
- January 29 – Acquired 2B Jorge Polanco from the Minnesota Twins in exchange for DeSclafani, RHP Justin Topa, OF Gabriel Gonzalez, RHP Darren Bowen, and cash.
- January 30 – Acquired 2B Samad Taylor from the Kansas City Royals for RHP Natanael Garabitos.
- February 3 – Acquired RHP Gregory Santos from the Chicago White Sox in exchange for RHP Prelander Berroa, OF Zach DeLoach, and the 69th pick in the 2024 MLB draft.

== Regular season ==
=== Season standings ===
==== American League West ====
AL West
Team	W	L	Pct.	GB	Home	Road
Houston Astros	88	73	.547	—	46‍–‍35	42‍–‍38
Seattle Mariners	85	77	.525	3½	49‍–‍32	36‍–‍45
Texas Rangers	78	84	.481	10½	44‍–‍37	34‍–‍47
Oakland Athletics	69	93	.426	19½	38‍–‍43	31‍–‍50
Los Angeles Angels	63	99	.389	25½	32‍–‍49	31‍–‍50

==== American League Wild Card ====
Division leaders
Team	W	L	Pct.
New York Yankees	94	68	.580
Cleveland Guardians	92	69	.571
Houston Astros	88	73	.547

Wild Card teams (Top 3 teams qualify for postseason)
Team	W	L	Pct.	GB
Baltimore Orioles	91	71	.562	+5
Kansas City Royals	86	76	.531	—
Detroit Tigers	86	76	.531	—
Seattle Mariners	85	77	.525	1
Minnesota Twins	82	80	.506	4
Boston Red Sox	81	81	.500	5
Tampa Bay Rays	80	82	.494	6
Texas Rangers	78	84	.481	8
Toronto Blue Jays	74	88	.457	12
Oakland Athletics	69	93	.426	17
Los Angeles Angels	63	99	.389	23
Chicago White Sox	41	121	.253	45

==== Record vs. opponents ====
===== Record vs. American League =====
2024 American League record Source: MLB Standings Grid – 2024
Team	BAL	BOS	CWS	CLE	DET	HOU	KC	LAA	MIN	NYY	OAK	SEA	TB	TEX	TOR	NL
Baltimore	—	8–5	6–1	3–4	2–4	2–5	4–2	4–2	6–0	8–5	3–3	4–2	9–4	5–2	7–6	20–26
Boston	5–8	—	4–3	2–5	3–4	2–4	4–2	4–2	3–3	6–7	5–1	4–3	6–7	4–2	8–5	21–25
Chicago	1–6	3–4	—	5–8	3–10	2–4	1–12	4–2	1–12	1–5	3–3	1–6	4–2	0–7	1–5	11–35
Cleveland	4–3	5–2	8–5	—	7–6	1–4	5–8	5–1	10–3	2–4	6–1	4–2	3–4	4–2	4–2	24–22
Detroit	4–2	4–3	10–3	6–7	—	2–4	6–7	3–4	6–7	2–4	3–3	5–1	5–1	3–4	5–2	22–24
Houston	5–2	4–2	4–2	4–1	4–2	—	4–3	9–4	2–4	1–6	8–5	5–8	4–2	7–6	5–2	22–24
Kansas City	2–4	2–4	12–1	8–5	7–6	3–4	—	5–2	6–7	2–5	4–2	3–3	3–3	1–5	5–2	23–23
Los Angeles	2–4	2–4	2–4	1–5	4–3	4–9	2–5	—	1–5	3–3	5–8	8–5	3–4	4–9	0–7	22–24
Minnesota	0–6	3–3	12–1	3–10	7–6	4–2	7–6	5–1	—	0–6	6–1	5–2	3–4	5–2	4–2	18–28
New York	5–8	7–6	5–1	4–2	4–2	6–1	5–2	3–3	6–0	—	5–2	4–3	7–6	3–3	7–6	23–23
Oakland	3–3	1–5	3–3	1–6	3–3	5–8	2–4	8–5	1–6	2–5	—	4–9	3–4	6–7	3–3	24–22
Seattle	2–4	3–4	6–1	2–4	1–5	8–5	3–3	5–8	2–5	3–4	9–4	—	3–3	10–3	2–4	26–20
Tampa Bay	4–9	7–6	2–4	4–3	1–5	2–4	3–3	4–3	4–3	6–7	4–3	3–3	—	1–5	9–4	26–20
Texas	2–5	2–4	7–0	2–4	4–3	6–7	5–1	9–4	2–5	3–3	7–6	3–10	5–1	—	2–4	19–27
Toronto	6–7	5–8	5–1	2–4	2–5	2–5	2–5	7–0	2–4	6–7	3–3	4–2	4–9	4–2	—	20–26

Updated with the results of all games through September 30, 2024.

===== Record vs. National League =====
2024 American League record vs. National League Source: MLB Standings
Team	AZ	ATL	CHC	CIN	COL	LAD	MIA	MIL	NYM	PHI	PIT	SD	SF	STL	WSH
Baltimore	2–1	2–1	0–3	3–0	2–1	1–2	1–2	1–2	1–2	2–1	1–2	1–2	1–2	0–3	2–2
Boston	0–3	1–3	2–1	2–1	1–2	0–3	3–0	1–2	0–3	2–1	3–0	1–2	2–1	1–2	2–1
Chicago	1–2	2–1	0–4	0–3	2–1	0–3	1–2	0–3	0–3	0–3	0–3	0–3	1–2	2–1	2–1
Cleveland	0–3	1–2	3–0	3–1	1–2	1–2	2–1	0–3	3–0	2–1	2–1	1–2	2–1	1–2	2–1
Detroit	2–1	0–3	1–2	3–0	2–1	2–1	1–2	1–2	2–1	1–2	2–2	1–2	1–2	2–1	1–2
Houston	2–1	0–3	0–3	0–3	4–0	2–1	3–0	2–1	2–1	1–2	1–2	1–2	1–2	2–1	1–2
Kansas City	1–2	1–2	1–2	3–0	1–2	1–2	2–1	2–1	1–2	1–2	2–1	1–2	0–3	3–1	3–0
Los Angeles	1–2	1–2	1–2	0–3	1–2	2–2	3–0	1–2	2–1	1–2	2–1	3–0	2–1	1–2	1–2
Minnesota	2–1	0–3	1–2	1–2	2–1	1–2	1–2	1–3	1–2	2–1	1–2	1–2	1–2	1–2	2–1
New York	2–1	1–2	2–1	0–3	2–1	1–2	2–1	2–1	0–4	3–0	1–2	2–1	3–0	1–2	1–2
Oakland	1–2	1–2	2–1	2–1	2–1	1–2	2–1	1–2	2–1	2–1	3–0	0–3	2–2	1–2	2–1
Seattle	2–1	2–1	1–2	3–0	2–1	0–3	1–2	1–2	3–0	2–1	1–2	3–1	2–1	2–1	1–2
Tampa Bay	3–0	1–2	2–1	2–1	2–1	1–2	3–1	1–2	3–0	0–3	2–1	1–2	2–1	1–2	2–1
Texas	2–2	1–2	2–1	2–1	0–3	2–1	2–1	0–3	1–2	0–3	2–1	1–2	1–2	1–2	2–1
Toronto	1–2	1–2	1–2	1–2	2–1	1–2	0–3	1–2	1–2	1–3	2–1	2–1	2–1	3–0	1–2

Updated with the results of all games through September 30, 2024.

=== Season summary ===
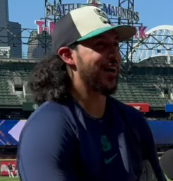
Andrés Muñoz was a 2024 All-Star.

After starting the season 4–8, the Mariners reached first place in the AL West on April 23 and held the division lead for almost three months, first falling to second place after the All-Star break. Starting pitcher Bryan Woo, injured to start the year, had a 1.07 earned run average (ERA) in his first six starts, the lowest in franchise history to begin a season. Closer Andrés Muñoz replaced Logan Gilbert as the team's representative in the MLB All-Star Game.

The Mariners were active at the trade deadline, adding Randy Arozarena, Justin Turner, Yimi García, and J. T. Chargois. However, Seattle fell out of first place on August 12, at the start of a five-game losing streak. Manager Scott Servais was fired on August 22, replaced by former Mariners catcher and broadcaster Dan Wilson. Julio Rodríguez, who was named the AL Player of the Week for September 15–21, helped power the offense during the final month of the season, but Seattle missed the playoffs by one game.

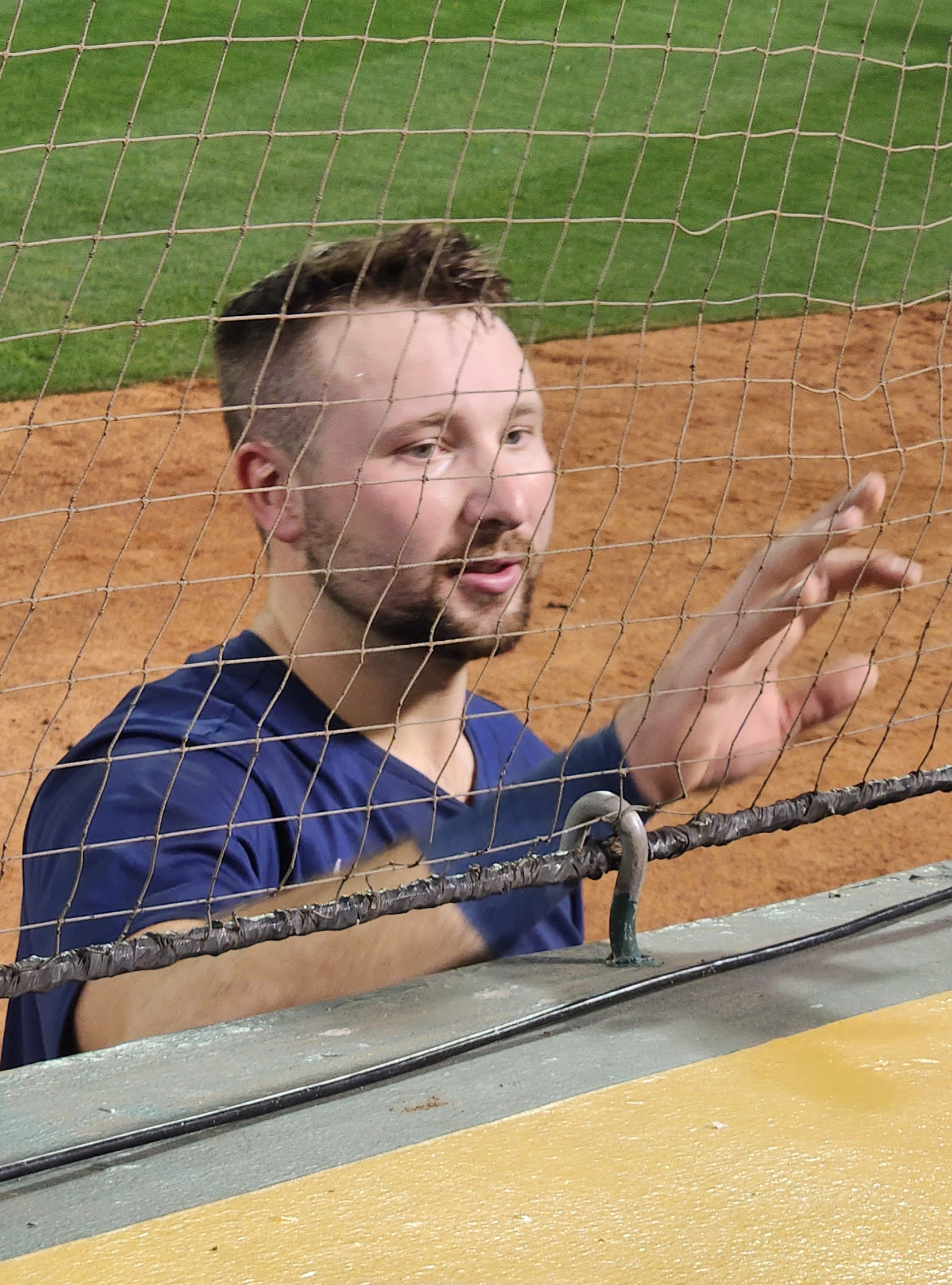
Cal Raleigh won the Platinum Glove Award in 2024.

Catcher Cal Raleigh won the Gold Glove Award at catcher and Platinum Glove Award for the AL. Dylan Moore won the utility Gold Glove. Gilbert led the majors with 208 2/3 innings pitched and 0.887 walks and hits per inning pitched. Starter George Kirby led the majors with 1.084 base on balls per nine innings pitched and a 7.783 strikeout-to-walk ratio. Raleigh ranked in the top 10 the AL in home runs, runs batted in, and strikeouts.

==== Transactions ====
- May 14 – Acquired SS Jake Slaughter and cash from the Chicago Cubs in exchange for RHP Tyson Miller.
- June 4 - Víctor Robles signed with the Mariners.
- July 25 - Acquired OF Randy Arozarena from the Tampa Bay Rays in exchange for RHP Brody Hopkins, OF Aidan Smith, and a player to be named later.
- July 26 - Acquired RHP Yimi García from the Toronto Blue Jays in exchange for OF Jonatan Clase and C Jacob Sharp.
- July 26 - Acquired OF Rhylan Thomas from the New York Mets in exchange for RHP Ryne Stanek.
- July 29 - Acquired DH/INF Justin Turner from the Blue Jays in exchange for OF RJ Schreck.
- July 30 - Acquired RHP J. T. Chargois from the Miami Marlins in exchange for RHP Will Schomberg.
- August 12 - Robles signed a two-year, $9.75 million contract extension.

=== Game log ===
Legend
	Mariners win
	Mariners loss
	Postponement
	Eliminated from playoff race
**Bold**	Mariners team member

2024 Game Log: 85–77 (Home 49–32, Road 36–45)
March/April: 17–13 (Home 11–7, Road 6–6)

#	Date	Opponent	Score	Win	Loss	Save	Attendance	Record	Streak
1	March 28	Red Sox	4–6	Bello (1–0)	**Castillo** (0–1)	Jansen (1)	45,337	0–1	L1
2	March 29	Red Sox	1–0	**Kirby** (1–0)	Pivetta (0–1)	**Muñoz** (1)	30,013	1–1	W1
3	March 30	Red Sox	4–3 (10)	**Saucedo** (1–0)	Rodríguez (0–1)	—	32,149	2–1	W2
4	March 31	Red Sox	1–5	Whitlock (1–0)	**Miller** (0–1)	Slaten (1)	29,331	2–2	L1
5	April 1	Guardians	5–4	**Hancock** (1–0)	McKenzie (0–1)	**Stanek** (1)	21,322	3–2	W1
6	April 2	Guardians	2–5	Bieber (2–0)	**Castillo** (0–2)	Clase (2)	20,646	3–3	L1
7	April 3	Guardians	0–8	Allen (2–0)	**Kirby** (1–1)	—	22,583	3–4	L2
8	April 5	@ Brewers	5–6	Uribe (1–0)	**Muñoz** (0–1)	—	23,035	3–5	L3
9	April 6	@ Brewers	5–3	**Miller** (1–1)	Hall (0–1)	**Muñoz** (2)	35,522	4–5	W1
10	April 7	@ Brewers	4–12	Rea (2–0)	**Hancock** (1–1)	Vieira (1)	25,573	4–6	L1
11	April 8	@ Blue Jays	2–5	Berríos (2–0)	**Castillo** (0–3)	—	40,069	4–7	L2
12	April 9	@ Blue Jays	3–5	Bassitt (1–2)	**Kirby** (1–2)	Green (2)	31,310	4–8	L3
13	April 10	@ Blue Jays	6–1 (10)	**Muñoz** (1–1)	Mayza (0–1)	—	22,960	5–8	W1
14	April 12	Cubs	4–2	**Miller** (2–1)	Wicks (0–2)	**Stanek** (2)	33,500	6–8	W2
15	April 13	Cubs	1–4	Imanaga (2–0)	**Hancock** (1–2)	Alzolay (2)	38,104	6–9	L1
16	April 14	Cubs	2–3	Assad (2–0)	**Castillo** (0–4)	Alzolay (3)	32,423	6–10	L2
17	April 15	Reds	9–3	**Kirby** (2–2)	Montas (2–2)	—	16,008	7–10	W1
18	April 16	Reds	3–1	**Gilbert** (1–0)	Pagán (1–1)	**Saucedo** (1)	17,291	8–10	W2
19	April 17	Reds	5–1	**Miller** (3–1)	Abbott (1–2)	—	17,225	9–10	W3
—	April 19	@ Rockies	Postponed (inclement weather); Makeup: April 21						
20	April 20	@ Rockies	7–0	**Castillo** (1–4)	Hudson (0–4)	—	25,376	10–10	W4
21	April 21 (1)	@ Rockies	1–2 (10)	Lawrence (1–0)	**Muñoz** (1–2)	—	33,283	10–11	L1
22	April 21 (2)	@ Rockies	10–2	**Hancock** (2–2)	Lambert (2–1)	—	19,756	11–11	W1
23	April 23	@ Rangers	4–0	**Gilbert** (2–0)	Dunning (2–2)	—	27,295	12–11	W2
24	April 24	@ Rangers	1–5	Hernández (1–0)	**Miller** (3–2)	—	31,896	12–12	L1
25	April 25	@ Rangers	4–3	**Castillo** (2–4)	Heaney (0–3)	**Muñoz** (3)	21,782	13–12	W1
26	April 26	Diamondbacks	6–1	**Hancock** (3–2)	Gallen (3–2)	—	33,997	14–12	W2
27	April 27	Diamondbacks	3–1	**Kirby** (3–2)	Cecconi (1–1)	**Muñoz** (4)	38,956	15–12	W3
28	April 28	Diamondbacks	2–3	Mantiply (2–1)	**Thornton** (0–1)	Ginkel (5)	33,474	15–13	L1
29	April 29	Braves	2–1	**Voth** (1–0)	Minter (5–2)	—	26,452	16–13	W1
30	April 30	Braves	3–2	**Castillo** (3–4)	López (2–1)	**Muñoz** (5)	23,534	17–13	W2

May: 15–14 (Home 8–4, Road 7–10)

#	Date	Opponent	Score	Win	Loss	Save	Attendance	Record	Streak
31	May 1	Braves	2–5	Sale (4–1)	**Hancock** (3–3)	Iglesias (8)	21,689	17–14	L1
32	May 3	@ Astros	3–5	Martinez (2–2)	**Speier** (0–1)	Hader (3)	33,796	17–15	L2
33	May 4	@ Astros	5–0	**Gilbert** (3–0)	Valdez (1–1)	—	34,206	18–15	W1
34	May 5	@ Astros	5–4	**Muñoz** (2–2)	Hader (1–3)	—	36,280	19–15	W2
35	May 6	@ Twins	1–3	Jax (3–2)	**Castillo** (3–5)	Thielbar (3)	14,384	19–16	L1
36	May 7	@ Twins	10–6	**Stanek** (1–0)	Alcalá (1–1)	—	14,710	20–16	W1
37	May 8	@ Twins	3–6	Paddack (4–1)	**Kirby** (3–3)	Durán (3)	15,685	20–17	L1
38	May 9	@ Twins	1–11	López (4–2)	**Gilbert** (3–1)	—	22,154	20–18	L2
39	May 10	Athletics	8–1	**Thornton** (1–1)	Blackburn (3–2)	—	39,743	21–18	W1
40	May 11	Athletics	1–8	Estes (1–0)	**Miller** (3–3)	—	32,398	21–19	L1
41	May 12	Athletics	8–4	**Castillo** (4–5)	Wood (1–3)	—	41,609	22–19	W1
42	May 13	Royals	6–2	**Kirby** (4–3)	Singer (3–2)	**Muñoz** (6)	14,984	23–19	W2
43	May 14	Royals	2–4	Wacha (3–4)	**Gilbert** (3–2)	McArthur (10)	20,665	23–20	L1
44	May 15	Royals	4–2	**Woo** (1–0)	Marsh (3–1)	**Muñoz** (7)	22,233	24–20	W1
45	May 17	@ Orioles	2–9	Means (2–0)	**Miller** (3–4)	—	38,882	24–21	L1
46	May 18	@ Orioles	4–3	**Stanek** (2–0)	Canó (2–2)	**Muñoz** (8)	19,286	25–21	W1
47	May 19	@ Orioles	3–6	Burnes (4–2)	**Kirby** (4–4)	Kimbrel (9)	30,494	25–22	L1
48	May 20	@ Yankees	5–4	**Bazardo** (1–0)	Holmes (1–1)	**Muñoz** (9)	37,590	26–22	W1
49	May 21	@ Yankees	6–3	**Woo** (2–0)	Schmidt (5–2)	**Muñoz** (10)	37,257	27–22	W2
50	May 22	@ Yankees	3–7	Cortés Jr. (3–4)	**Miller** (3–5)	—	40,224	27–23	L1
51	May 23	@ Yankees	0–5	Gil (6–1)	**Castillo** (4–6)	Holmes (14)	43,121	27–24	L2
52	May 24	@ Nationals	1–6	Gore (3–4)	**Kirby** (4–5)	—	23,789	27–25	L3
53	May 25	@ Nationals	1–3	Floro (1–0)	**Speier** (0–2)	Finnegan (14)	30,791	27–26	L4
54	May 26	@ Nationals	9–5	**Voth** (2–0)	Floro (1–1)	—	25,935	28–26	W1
55	May 27	Astros	3–2	**Miller** (4–5)	Valdez (3–3)	**Muñoz** (11)	23,814	29–26	W2
56	May 28	Astros	4–2	**Saucedo** (2–0)	Pressly (0–2)	**Stanek** (3)	17,701	30–26	W3
57	May 29	Astros	2–1 (10)	**Baumann** (2–0)	Scott (1–2)	—	25,437	31–26	W4
58	May 30	Astros	0–4	Arrighetti (3–5)	**Gilbert** (3–3)	—	25,527	31–27	L1
59	May 31	Angels	5–4	**Stanek** (3–0)	Moore (1–2)	**Muñoz** (12)	40,001	32–27	W1

June: 15–12 (Home 9–3, Road 6–9)

#	Date	Opponent	Score	Win	Loss	Save	Attendance	Record	Streak
60	June 1	Angels	9–0	**Miller** (5–5)	Detmers (3–6)	—	39,932	33–27	W2
61	June 2	Angels	5–1	**Castillo** (5–6)	Canning (2–5)	—	35,990	34–27	W3
62	June 4	@ Athletics	4–3	**Kirby** (5–5)	Spence (4–3)	**Saucedo** (2)	5,624	35–27	W4
63	June 5	@ Athletics	1–2	Estes (2–1)	**Gilbert** (3–4)	Miller (12)	9,735	35–28	L1
64	June 6	@ Athletics	3–0	**Woo** (3–0)	Sears (4–5)	**Stanek** (4)	6,571	36–28	W1
65	June 7	@ Royals	9–10	Anderson (3–1)	**Stanek** (3–1)	—	25,178	36–29	L1
66	June 8	@ Royals	4–8	Marsh (5–3)	**Castillo** (5–7)	—	18,351	36–30	L2
67	June 9	@ Royals	6–5 (10)	**Baumann** (3–0)	McArthur (2–3)	**Saucedo** (3)	20,926	37–30	W1
68	June 10	White Sox	8–4	**Stanek** (4–1)	Leasure (0–2)	—	23,027	38–30	W2
69	June 11	White Sox	4–3	**Thornton** (2–1)	Brebbia (0–4)	**Stanek** (5)	20,005	39–30	W3
70	June 12	White Sox	2–1 (10)	**Thornton** (3–1)	Wilson (1–3)	—	23,312	40–30	W4
71	June 13	White Sox	2–3 (10)	Kopech (2–6)	**Muñoz** (2–3)	Banks (2)	25,567	40–31	L1
72	June 14	Rangers	3–2	**Castillo** (6–7)	Heaney (2–8)	**Stanek** (6)	41,814	41–31	W1
73	June 15	Rangers	7–5	**Kirby** (6–5)	Eovaldi (3–3)	**Stanek** (7)	43,448	42–31	W2
74	June 16	Rangers	5–0	**Gilbert** (4–4)	Dunning (4–6)	—	45,584	43–31	W3
75	June 18	@ Guardians	8–5	**Miller** (6–5)	McKenzie (3–4)	**Muñoz** (13)	25,453	44–31	W4
76	June 19	@ Guardians	0–8	Bibee (5–2)	**Woo** (3–1)	—	26,107	44–32	L1
77	June 20	@ Guardians	3–6	Allen (8–3)	**Castillo** (6–8)	Clase (22)	24,470	44–33	L2
78	June 21	@ Marlins	2–3 (10)	Bender (2–2)	**Voth** (2–1)	—	11,794	44–34	L3
79	June 22	@ Marlins	9–0	**Gilbert** (5–4)	Anderson (0–2)	—	13,217	45–34	W1
80	June 23	@ Marlins	4–6	Puk (1–8)	**Miller** (6–6)	Scott (9)	13,540	45–35	L1
81	June 24	@ Rays	3–4	Maton (1–2)	**Voth** (2–2)	Fairbanks (12)	14,482	45–36	L2
82	June 25	@ Rays	3–11	Cleavinger (5–1)	**Castillo** (6–9)	—	14,034	45–37	L3
83	June 26	@ Rays	5–2	**Kirby** (7–5)	Armstrong (2–2)	**Thornton** (1)	18,286	46–37	W1
84	June 28	Twins	3–2 (10)	**Stanek** (5–1)	Sands (2–1)	—	44,924	47–37	W2
85	June 29	Twins	1–5	López (8–6)	**Miller** (6–7)	—	35,551	47–38	L1
86	June 30	Twins	3–5	Sands (3–1)	**Stanek** (5–2)	Durán (12)	33,367	47–39	L2

July: 10–14 (Home 3–9, Road 7–5)

#	Date	Opponent	Score	Win	Loss	Save	Attendance	Record	Streak
87	July 2	Orioles	0–2	Rodriguez (10–3)	**Kirby** (7–6)	Kimbrel (20)	36,173	47–40	L3
88	July 3	Orioles	1–4	Kremer (4–4)	**Gilbert** (5–5)	Kimbrel (21)	37,998	47–41	L4
89	July 4	Orioles	7–3	**Stanek** (6–2)	Baker (1–1)	—	32,347	48–41	W1
90	July 5	Blue Jays	2–1	**Castillo** (7–9)	Gausman (6–8)	**Muñoz** (14)	34,493	49–41	W2
91	July 6	Blue Jays	4–5	Rodríguez (1–3)	**Hancock** (3–4)	Green (4)	38,264	49–42	L1
92	July 7	Blue Jays	4–5 (10)	Green (2–1)	**Snider** (0–1)	Cabrera (2)	34,885	49–43	L2
93	July 9	@ Padres	8–3	**Gilbert** (6–5)	Mazur (1–3)	—	43,123	50–43	W1
94	July 10	@ Padres	2–0	**Miller** (7–7)	King (7–6)	**Muñoz** (15)	39,611	51–43	W2
95	July 11	@ Angels	11–0	**Castillo** (8–9)	Kochanowicz (0–1)	—	26,747	52–43	W3
96	July 12	@ Angels	5–6 (10)	Crouse (2–0)	**Voth** (2–3)	—	31,243	52–44	L1
97	July 13	@ Angels	1–2	Soriano (5–7)	**Kirby** (7–7)	Estévez (17)	43,273	52–45	L2
98	July 14	@ Angels	2–3	Crouse (3–0)	**Voth** (2–4)	Contreras (1)	26,015	52–46	L3
**94th All-Star Game in Arlington, TX**
99	July 19	Astros	0–3	Brown (8–6)	**Castillo** (8–10)	Hader (19)	40,948	52–47	L4
100	July 20	Astros	2–4	Scott (7–3)	**Stanek** (6–3)	Hader (20)	38,017	52–48	L5
101	July 21	Astros	6–4	**Woo** (4–1)	Blanco (9–5)	**Muñoz** (16)	35,038	53–48	W1
102	July 22	Angels	1–3	García (5–1)	**Thornton** (3–2)	Estévez (19)	22,528	53–49	L1
103	July 23	Angels	1–5	Soriano (6–7)	**Gilbert** (6–6)	—	26,496	53–50	L2
104	July 24	Angels	1–2	Crouse (4–0)	**Santos** (0–1)	Estévez (20)	39,953	53–51	L3
105	July 26	@ White Sox	10–0	**Kirby** (8–7)	Thorpe (3–2)	—	20,170	54–51	W1
106	July 27	@ White Sox	6–3	**Snider** (1–1)	Fedde (7–4)	**Muñoz** (17)	21,037	55–51	W2
107	July 28	@ White Sox	6–3	**Miller** (8–7)	Crochet (6–8)	**Muñoz** (18)	17,100	56–51	W3
108	July 29	@ Red Sox	7–14	Pivetta (5–7)	**Gilbert** (6–7)	—	35,007	56–52	L1
109	July 30	@ Red Sox	10–6	**Castillo** (9–10)	Paxton (8–3)	—	36,592	57–52	W1
110	July 31	@ Red Sox	2–3 (10)	Kelly (4–1)	**Díaz** (0–1)	—	34,643	57–53	L1

August: 12–14 (Home 10–5, Road 2–9)

#	Date	Opponent	Score	Win	Loss	Save	Attendance	Record	Streak
111	August 2	Phillies	10–2	**Woo** (5–1)	Phillips (3–1)	—	40,739	58–53	W1
112	August 3	Phillies	6–5 (10)	**Snider** (2–1)	Estévez (1–4)	—	36,629	59–53	W2
113	August 4	Phillies	0–6	Wheeler (11–5)	**Gilbert** (6–8)	—	39,588	59–54	L1
114	August 6	Tigers	2–4	Montero (2–5)	**Castillo** (9–11)	Holton (4)	27,119	59–55	L2
115	August 7	Tigers	2–6	Skubal (13–4)	**Kirby** (8–8)	—	26,033	59–56	L3
116	August 8	Tigers	4–3	**Chargois** (2–0)	Vest (2–4)	—	27,927	60–56	W1
117	August 9	Mets	6–0	**Miller** (9–7)	Quintana (6–8)	—	34,889	61–56	W2
118	August 10	Mets	4–0	**Gilbert** (7–8)	Manaea (8–5)	—	31,407	62–56	W3
119	August 11	Mets	12–1	**Castillo** (10–11)	Severino (7–6)	—	35,460	63–56	W4
120	August 13	@ Tigers	1–15	Skubal (14–4)	**Kirby** (8–9)	Wentz (1)	20,170	63–57	L1
121	August 14	@ Tigers	2–3 (10)	Holton (5–1)	**Snider** (2–2)	—	18,714	63–58	L2
122	August 15	@ Tigers	1–2	Miller (6–7)	**Muñoz** (2–4)	Foley (16)	20,429	63–59	L3
123	August 16	@ Pirates	3–5	Skenes (7–2)	**Gilbert** (7–9)	Bednar (21)	27,058	63–60	L4
124	August 17	@ Pirates	2–7	Falter (6–7)	**Castillo** (10–12)	Bednar (22)	23,326	63–61	L5
125	August 18	@ Pirates	10–3	**Kirby** (9–9)	Woodford (0–5)	—	24,903	64–61	W1
126	August 19	@ Dodgers	0–3	Stone (11–5)	**Woo** (5–2)	Phillips (16)	51,438	64–62	L1
127	August 20	@ Dodgers	3–6	Kelly (1–0)	**Muñoz** (2–5)	Hudson (10)	48,395	64–63	L2
128	August 21	@ Dodgers	4–8	Flaherty (10–5)	**Gilbert** (7–10)	—	45,295	64–64	L3
129	August 23	Giants	6–5 (10)	**Snider** (3–2)	Miller (3–5)	—	38,762	65–64	W1
130	August 24	Giants	3–4	Bivens (3–1)	**Kirby** (9–10)	Walker (3)	38,027	65–65	L1
131	August 25	Giants	4–3	**Woo** (6–2)	Hjelle (3–4)	**Muñoz** (19)	35,062	66–65	W1
132	August 26	Rays	5–1	**Miller** (10–7)	Pepiot (7–6)	—	29,755	67–65	W2
133	August 27	Rays	2–3	Uceta (2–0)	**Chargois** (2–1)	Rodríguez (2)	26,153	67–66	L1
134	August 28	Rays	6–2	**Castillo** (11–12)	Alexander (5–4)	—	35,131	68–66	W1
135	August 30	@ Angels	9–5	**Kirby** (10–10)	Aldegheri (0–1)	—	34,435	69–66	W2
136	August 31	@ Angels	4–5	Joyce (2–0)	**Muñoz** (2–6)	—	34,253	69–67	L1

September: 16–10 (Home 8–4, Road 8–6)

#	Date	Opponent	Score	Win	Loss	Save	Attendance	Record	Streak
137	September 1	@ Angels	2–3	Dana (1–0)	**Miller** (10–8)	Joyce (4)	39,370	69–68	L2
138	September 2	@ Athletics	4–5	Ferguson (3–2)	**Voth** (2–5)	—	12,167	69–69	L3
139	September 3	@ Athletics	2–3	Harris (3–3)	**Thornton** (3–3)	—	3,924	69–70	L4
140	September 4	@ Athletics	16–3	**Kirby** (11–10)	Sears (11–10)	—	4,390	70–70	W1
141	September 5	@ Athletics	6–4	**Woo** (7–2)	Estes (6–7)	—	5,581	71–70	W2
142	September 6	@ Cardinals	6–1	**Miller** (11–8)	Fedde (8–9)	—	37,476	72–70	W3
143	September 7	@ Cardinals	0–2	Kittredge (4–4)	**Gilbert** (7–11)	Helsley (43)	38,532	72–71	L1
144	September 8	@ Cardinals	10–4	**Thornton** (4–3)	Mikolas (8–11)	—	41,301	73–71	W1
145	September 10	Padres	3–7	Darvish (5–3)	**Kirby** (11–11)	Suárez (32)	25,012	73–72	L1
146	September 11	Padres	5–2	**Woo** (8–2)	King (12–9)	**Muñoz** (20)	21,129	74–72	W1
147	September 12	Rangers	4–5	Festa (4–1)	**Snider** (3–3)	Yates (30)	22,212	74–73	L1
148	September 13	Rangers	5–4	**Chargois** (3–1)	Robertson (3–4)	**Muñoz** (21)	32,996	75–73	W1
149	September 14	Rangers	5–4	**Muñoz** (3–6)	Leclerc (6–5)	—	33,629	76–73	W2
150	September 15	Rangers	7–0	**Kirby** (12–11)	Heaney (5–14)	—	36,137	77–73	W3
151	September 17	Yankees	2–11	Gil (14–6)	**Woo** (8–3)	Stroman (1)	31,668	77–74	L1
152	September 18	Yankees	1–2 (10)	Weaver (6–3)	**Snider** (3–4)	Hamilton (1)	31,674	77–75	L2
153	September 19	Yankees	3–2	**Gilbert** (8–11)	Schmidt (5–4)	**Muñoz** (22)	34,255	78–75	W1
154	September 20	@ Rangers	8–2	**Kirby** (13–11)	Leiter (0–3)	—	33,387	79–75	W2
155	September 21	@ Rangers	8–4	**Hancock** (4–4)	Chafin (4–3)	—	39,929	80–75	W3
156	September 22	@ Rangers	5–6	Yates (7–2)	**Muñoz** (3–7)	—	39,882	80–76	L1
157	September 23	@ Astros	6–1	**Miller** (12–8)	Brown (11–9)	—	34,554	81–76	W1
158	September 24	@ Astros	3–4	Valdez (15–7)	**Gilbert** (8–12)	Hader (34)	38,195	81–77	L1
159	September 25	@ Astros	8–1	**Kirby** (14–11)	Kikuchi (9–10)	—	32,219	82–77	W1
160	September 27	Athletics	2–0	**Woo** (9–3)	Sears (11–13)	**Taylor** (1)	41,429	83–77	W2
161	September 28	Athletics	7–6 (10)	**Bazardo** (2–0)	Alexander (1–3)	—	33,007	84–77	W3
162	September 29	Athletics	6–4	**Gilbert** (9–12)	Spence (8–10)	—	42,177	85–77	W4

== 2024 roster ==
2024 Seattle Mariners
Roster
Pitchers: 53 Mike Baumann; 83 Eduard Bazardo; 67 Cody Bolton; 49 Matt Bowman; 58 Luis Castillo; 84 J. T. Chargois; 59 Brett de Geus; 74 Jhonathan Díaz; 93 Yimi García; 36 Logan Gilbert; 62 Emerson Hancock; 72 Jonathan Hernández; 68 George Kirby; 50 Bryce Miller; 49 Tyson Miller; 75 Andrés Muñoz; 48 Gregory Santos; 60 Tayler Saucedo; 43 Kirby Snead; 52 Collin Snider; 55 Gabe Speier; 45 Ryne Stanek; 59 Troy Taylor; 46 Trent Thornton; 30 Austin Voth; 22 Bryan Woo	Catchers: 18 Mitch Garver; 29 Cal Raleigh; 33 Seby Zavala; Infielders: 1 Ryan Bliss; 3 J. P. Crawford; 23 Ty France; 27 Tyler Locklear; 25 Dylan Moore; 7 Jorge Polanco; 76 Leo Rivas; 4 Josh Rojas; 2 Justin Turner; 16,23 Luis Urías; 35 Jason Vosler	Outfielders: 56 Randy Arozarena; 5 Jonatan Clase; 8 Dominic Canzone; 0 Sam Haggerty; 17 Mitch Haniger; 2,5 Cade Marlowe; 20 Luke Raley; 10 Víctor Robles; 44 Julio Rodríguez; 12 Samad Taylor	Manager: 9 Scott Servais; 6 Dan Wilson; Coaches: 14 Manny Acta (third base); 57 Tony Arnerich (bullpen); 66 Fleming Baez (bullpen catcher); 40 Trent Blank (director of pitching strategy); 73 Brant Brown (bench); 89 Nasusel Cabrera (batting practice pitcher); 88 Jarret DeHart (hitting); 80 Danny Farquhar (assistant pitching); 16 Perry Hill (infield); 81 Tommy Joseph (assistant hitting); 11 Edgar Martínez (hitting); 21 Kristopher Negrón (first base); 95 Justin Novak (bullpen catcher); 39 Carson Vitale (field coordinator); 32 Pete Woodworth (pitching)

=== Player stats ===
= Indicates team leader

= Indicates league leader

==== Batting ====
Note: G = Games played; AB = At bats; R = Runs scored; H = Hits; 2B = Doubles; 3B = Triples; HR = Home runs; RBI = Runs batted in; SB = Stolen bases, BB = Walks; AVG = Batting average; SLG = Slugging percentage

Player	G	AB	R	H	2B	3B	HR	RBI	SB	BB	AVG	SLG
Julio Rodríguez	143	567	76	155	17	0	20	68	24	38	.273	.409
Cal Raleigh	153	546	73	120	16	0	34	100	6	70	.220	.436
Josh Rojas	142	422	48	95	19	2	8	31	10	46	.225	.336
Jorge Polanco	118	417	43	89	11	0	16	45	4	46	.213	.355
Luke Raley	137	404	58	98	19	2	22	58	11	27	.243	.463
J. P. Crawford	105	392	55	79	16	2	9	37	5	52	.202	.321
Mitch Haniger	121	380	42	79	12	0	12	44	0	40	.208	.334
Dylan Moore	135	368	53	74	23	4	10	42	32	53	.201	.367
Mitch Garver	114	367	37	63	17	0	15	51	0	53	.172	.341
Ty France	88	300	28	67	14	0	8	31	0	28	.223	.350
Víctor Robles	77	229	41	75	20	0	4	26	30	16	.328	.467
Randy Arozarena	54	199	32	46	14	0	5	23	4	28	.231	.377
Dominic Canzone	67	168	20	33	7	0	8	17	1	18	.196	.381
Justin Turner	48	159	22	42	7	0	5	24	0	20	.264	.403
Luis Urías	41	94	11	18	7	0	4	16	0	9	.191	.394
Leo Rivas	43	73	10	17	1	1	0	8	3	10	.233	.274
Ryan Bliss	33	63	10	14	3	1	2	9	5	5	.222	.397
Tyler Locklear	16	45	3	7	1	0	2	3	1	3	.156	.311
Jonatan Clase	19	41	4	8	1	0	0	3	3	2	.195	.220
Seby Zavala	18	39	4	6	2	0	1	2	0	3	.154	.282
Jason Vosler	10	28	2	5	1	1	0	3	0	2	.179	.286
Sam Haggerty	8	15	1	1	0	0	0	1	1	1	.067	.067
Cade Marlowe	8	8	1	2	0	0	0	0	0	1	.250	.250
Samad Taylor	3	5	2	2	0	0	0	0	0	0	.400	.400
Luis Castillo	1	1	0	0	0	0	0	0	0	0	.000	.000
Team totals	162	5330	676	1195	228	13	185	642	140	571	.224	.376

==== Pitching ====
Note: W = Wins; L = Losses; ERA = Earned run average; G = Games pitched; GS = Games started; SV = Saves; IP = Innings pitched; H = Hits allowed; R = Runs allowed; ER = Earned runs allowed; BB = Walks allowed; K = Strikeouts

Player	W	L	ERA	G	GS	SV	IP	H	R	ER	BB	K
Logan Gilbert	9	12	3.23	33	33	0	208.2	148	83	75	37	220
George Kirby	14	11	3.53	33	33	0	191.0	181	82	75	23	179
Bryce Miller	12	8	2.94	31	31	0	180.1	131	62	59	45	171
Luis Castillo	11	12	3.64	30	30	0	175.1	158	73	71	47	175
Bryan Woo	9	3	2.89	22	22	0	121.1	96	41	39	13	101
Trent Thornton	4	3	3.61	71	0	1	72.1	63	32	29	19	77
Austin Voth	2	5	3.69	68	0	0	61.0	46	31	25	18	61
Emerson Hancock	4	4	4.75	12	12	0	60.2	62	37	32	19	39
Andrés Muñoz	3	7	2.12	60	0	22	59.1	31	16	14	26	77
Collin Snider	3	4	1.94	42	0	0	41.2	36	14	9	13	47
Ryne Stanek	6	3	4.38	46	0	7	39.0	35	21	19	17	44
Tayler Saucedo	2	0	3.49	53	0	3	38.2	35	15	15	18	38
Eduard Bazardo	2	0	4.88	23	0	0	27.2	20	15	15	9	33
Gabe Speier	0	2	5.70	29	0	0	23.2	19	15	15	14	33
J. T. Chargois	2	1	2.75	21	0	0	19.2	9	6	6	6	18
Troy Taylor	0	0	3.72	21	0	1	19.1	15	8	8	7	25
Cody Bolton	0	0	4.34	17	0	0	18.2	18	11	9	9	17
Mike Baumann	2	0	5.51	18	0	0	16.1	13	11	10	8	16
Tyson Miller	0	0	3.09	9	0	0	11.2	8	5	4	1	12
Kirby Snead	0	0	4.35	11	0	0	10.1	12	5	5	7	7
Jhonathan Díaz	0	1	4.66	5	1	0	9.2	14	6	5	3	8
Yimi García	0	0	6.00	10	0	0	9.0	7	6	6	4	7
Gregory Santos	0	1	4.91	8	0	0	7.1	7	4	4	1	6
Brett de Geus	0	0	2.70	4	0	0	3.1	4	1	1	0	2
Jonathan Hernández	0	0	11.57	3	0	0	2.1	2	3	3	2	3
Josh Rojas	0	0	9.00	2	0	0	2.0	1	2	2	2	0
Leo Rivas	0	0	0.00	2	0	0	2.0	2	1	0	0	0
Matt Bowman	0	0	13.50	1	0	0	0.2	1	1	1	1	0
Team totals	85	77	3.49	162	162	34	1433.0	1174	607	556	369	1416

== Farm system ==
Level	Team	League	Manager
AAA	Tacoma Rainiers	Pacific Coast League	John Russell
AA	Arkansas Travelers	Texas League	Christian Colón
High-A	Everett AquaSox	Northwest League	Ryan Scott
A	Modesto Nuts	California League	Zach Vincej
Rookie	ACL Mariners	Arizona Complex League	Luis Caballero
Foreign Rookie	DSL Mariners	Dominican Summer League	Jose Amancio
