= List of Seattle Mariners minor league affiliates =

Current Seattle Mariners domestic minor league affiliate locations

The Seattle Mariners farm system consists of six Minor League Baseball affiliates across the United States and in the Dominican Republic. Four teams are independently owned, while two others, the Arizona Complex League Mariners and Dominican Summer League Mariners, are owned by the major league club.

The Mariners have been affiliated with the Triple-A Tacoma Rainiers of the Pacific Coast League and High-A Everett AquaSox of the Northwest League since 1995, making them the longest-running affiliations in the organization among teams not owned by the Mariners. Their newest affiliate is the Inland Empire 66ers of the California League, which will become the Mariners' Single-A affiliate in 2026.

Geographically, Seattle's closest affiliates are the Tacoma Rainiers, which are approximately 26 miles (42 km) away, and the Everett AquaSox, which are approximately 27 miles (43 km) away. Seattle's furthest domestic affiliate is the Arkansas Travelers, 1,781 miles (2,866 km) away.

== Current affiliates ==
The Seattle Mariners farm system consists of six minor league affiliates.

Class	Team	League	Location	Ballpark	Affiliated
Triple-A	Tacoma Rainiers	Pacific Coast League	Tacoma, Washington	Cheney Stadium	1995
Double-A	Arkansas Travelers	Texas League	North Little Rock, Arkansas	Dickey–Stephens Park	2017
High-A	Everett AquaSox	Northwest League	Everett, Washington	Funko Field	1995
Single-A	Inland Empire 66ers	California League	San Bernardino, California	San Manuel Stadium	2026
Rookie	ACL Mariners	Arizona Complex League	Peoria, Arizona	Peoria Sports Complex	1989
Rookie	DSL Mariners	Dominican Summer League	Boca Chica, Santo Domingo	Las Palmas Complex	1989

== Past affiliates ==
=== Key ===
Season	Each year is linked to an article about that particular Mariners season.

=== 1977–1989 ===
Prior to Mariners formation, Major League Baseball (MLB) organized Minor League Baseball into five classes, Triple-A, Double-A, Class A, Class A Short Season, and Rookie.

Season	Triple-A	Double-A	Class A	Class A Short Season	Rookie	Ref(s).
1977	—	—	—	Bellingham Mariners	—	
1978	San Jose Missions	—	Stockton Mariners	Bellingham Mariners	—	
1979	Spokane Indians	—	Alexandria Mariners; San Jose Missions	Bellingham Mariners	—	
1980	Spokane Indians	Lynn Sailors	San Jose Missions	Bellingham Mariners	—	
1981	Spokane Indians	Lynn Sailors	Wausau Timbers	Bellingham Mariners	—	
1982	Salt Lake City Gulls	Lynn Sailors	Bakersfield Mariners; Wausau Timbers	Bellingham Mariners	—	
1983	Salt Lake City Gulls	Chattanooga Lookouts	Bakersfield Mariners; Wausau Timbers	Bellingham Mariners	—	
1984	Salt Lake City Gulls	Chattanooga Lookouts	Salinas Spurs; Wausau Timbers	Bellingham Mariners	Butte Copper Kings	
1985	Calgary Cannons	Chattanooga Lookouts	Salinas Spurs; Wausau Timbers	Bellingham Mariners	—	
1986	Calgary Cannons	Chattanooga Lookouts	Salinas Spurs; Wausau Timbers	Bellingham Mariners	—	
1987	Calgary Cannons	Chattanooga Lookouts	Salinas Spurs; Wausau Timbers	Bellingham Mariners	—	
1988	Calgary Cannons	Vermont Mariners	San Bernardino Spirit; Wausau Timbers	Bellingham Mariners	AZL Mariners/Red Sox	
1989	Calgary Cannons	Williamsport Bills	San Bernardino Spirit; Wausau Timbers	Bellingham Mariners	AZL Mariners; DSL Mariners	

=== 1990–2020 ===
Minor League Baseball operated with six classes from 1990 to 2020. In 1990, the Class A level was subdivided for a second time with the creation of Class A-Advanced. The Rookie level consisted of domestic and foreign circuits. In 1995, the Mariners moved two affiliates closer to Seattle, adding the Tacoma Rainiers and Everett AquaSox to their system. The Venezuelan Summer League started in 1997, with the Mariners adding an affiliate in 2002, and folded after the 2015 season. The Mariners operated a second Dominican Summer League team, called DSL Mariners 2, in 2015. Two longtime affiliates, the Double-A Arkansas Travelers and Class A-Advanced Modesto Nuts, joined the Mariners system in 2017, with the Mariners purchasing the Nuts.

Season	Triple-A	Double-A	Class A-Advanced	Class A	Class A Short Season	Rookie	Foreign Rookie	Ref(s).
1990	Calgary Cannons	Williamsport Bills	Peninsula Pilots; San Bernardino Spirit	—	Bellingham Mariners	AZL Mariners	DSL Mariners	
1991	Calgary Cannons	Jacksonville Suns	Peninsula Pilots; San Bernardino Spirit	—	Bellingham Mariners	AZL Mariners	DSL Mariners	
1992	Calgary Cannons	Jacksonville Suns	Peninsula Pilots; San Bernardino Spirit	—	Bellingham Mariners	AZL Mariners	DSL Mariners	
1993	Calgary Cannons	Jacksonville Suns	Riverside Pilots	Appleton Foxes	Bellingham Mariners	AZL Mariners	DSL Mariners	
1994	Calgary Cannons	Jacksonville Suns	Riverside Pilots	Appleton Foxes	Bellingham Mariners	AZL Mariners	DSL Mariners	
1995	Tacoma Rainiers	Port City Roosters	Riverside Pilots	Wisconsin Timber Rattlers	Everett AquaSox	AZL Mariners	DSL Mariners	
1996	Tacoma Rainiers	Port City Roosters	Lancaster JetHawks	Wisconsin Timber Rattlers	Everett AquaSox	AZL Mariners	DSL Mariners	
1997	Tacoma Rainiers	Memphis Chicks	Lancaster JetHawks	Wisconsin Timber Rattlers	Everett AquaSox	AZL Mariners	DSL Mariners	
1998	Tacoma Rainiers	Orlando Rays	Lancaster JetHawks	Wisconsin Timber Rattlers	Everett AquaSox	AZL Mariners	DSL Mariners	
1999	Tacoma Rainiers	New Haven Ravens	Lancaster JetHawks	Wisconsin Timber Rattlers	Everett AquaSox	AZL Mariners	DSL Mariners	
2000	Tacoma Rainiers	New Haven Ravens	Lancaster JetHawks	Wisconsin Timber Rattlers	Everett AquaSox	AZL Mariners	DSL Mariners	
2001	Tacoma Rainiers	San Antonio Missions	San Bernardino Stampede	Wisconsin Timber Rattlers	Everett AquaSox	AZL Mariners	DSL Mariners	
2002	Tacoma Rainiers	San Antonio Missions	San Bernardino Stampede	Wisconsin Timber Rattlers	Everett AquaSox	AZL Mariners	DSL Mariners; VSL Aguirre	
2003	Tacoma Rainiers	San Antonio Missions	Inland Empire 66ers	Wisconsin Timber Rattlers	Everett AquaSox	AZL Mariners	DSL Mariners; VSL Aguirre	
2004	Tacoma Rainiers	San Antonio Missions	Inland Empire 66ers	Wisconsin Timber Rattlers	Everett AquaSox	AZL Mariners	DSL Mariners; VSL Aguirre	
2005	Tacoma Rainiers	San Antonio Missions	Inland Empire 66ers	Wisconsin Timber Rattlers	Everett AquaSox	AZL Mariners	DSL Mariners; VSL Mariners	
2006	Tacoma Rainiers	San Antonio Missions	Inland Empire 66ers	Wisconsin Timber Rattlers	Everett AquaSox	AZL Mariners	DSL Mariners; VSL Mariners	
2007	Tacoma Rainiers	West Tenn Diamond Jaxx	High Desert Mavericks	Wisconsin Timber Rattlers	Everett AquaSox	AZL Mariners	DSL Mariners; VSL Mariners	
2008	Tacoma Rainiers	West Tenn Diamond Jaxx	High Desert Mavericks	Wisconsin Timber Rattlers	Everett AquaSox	Pulaski Mariners; AZL Mariners	DSL Mariners; VSL Mariners	
2009	Tacoma Rainiers	West Tenn Diamond Jaxx	High Desert Mavericks	Clinton LumberKings	Everett AquaSox	Pulaski Mariners; AZL Mariners	DSL Mariners; VSL Mariners	
2010	Tacoma Rainiers	West Tenn Diamond Jaxx	High Desert Mavericks	Clinton LumberKings	Everett AquaSox	Pulaski Mariners; AZL Mariners	DSL Mariners; VSL Mariners	
2011	Tacoma Rainiers	Jackson Generals	High Desert Mavericks	Clinton LumberKings	Everett AquaSox	Pulaski Mariners; AZL Mariners	DSL Mariners; VSL Mariners	
2012	Tacoma Rainiers	Jackson Generals	High Desert Mavericks	Clinton LumberKings	Everett AquaSox	Pulaski Mariners; AZL Mariners	DSL Mariners; VSL Mariners	
2013	Tacoma Rainiers	Jackson Generals	High Desert Mavericks	Clinton LumberKings	Everett AquaSox	Pulaski Mariners; AZL Mariners	DSL Mariners; VSL Mariners	
2014	Tacoma Rainiers	Jackson Generals	High Desert Mavericks	Clinton LumberKings	Everett AquaSox	Pulaski Mariners; AZL Mariners	DSL Mariners; VSL Mariners	
2015	Tacoma Rainiers	Jackson Generals	Bakersfield Blaze	Clinton LumberKings	Everett AquaSox	AZL Mariners	DSL Mariners 1 DSL Mariners 2 VSL Mariners	
2016	Tacoma Rainiers	Jackson Generals	Bakersfield Blaze	Clinton LumberKings	Everett AquaSox	AZL Mariners	DSL Mariners	
2017	Tacoma Rainiers	Arkansas Travelers	Modesto Nuts	Clinton LumberKings	Everett AquaSox	AZL Mariners	DSL Mariners	
2018	Tacoma Rainiers	Arkansas Travelers	Modesto Nuts	Clinton LumberKings	Everett AquaSox	AZL Mariners	DSL Mariners	
2019	Tacoma Rainiers	Arkansas Travelers	Modesto Nuts	West Virginia Power	Everett AquaSox	AZL Mariners	DSL Mariners	
2020 (Note: The 2020 Minor League Baseball season was cancelled due to the COVID-19 pandemic.)	Tacoma Rainiers	Arkansas Travelers	Modesto Nuts	West Virginia Power	Everett AquaSox	AZL Mariners	DSL Mariners	

=== 2021–present ===
Minor League Baseball contracted before the 2021 season. Class A was reduced to two levels: High-A and Low-A. The Everett AquaSox, which had been a Class A Short-Season team, were promoted to High-A, and the West Virginia Power lost their affiliated status. Low-A was reclassified as Single-A in 2022.

The Mariners sold the Single-A Modesto Nuts at the end of 2024, and new owners Diamond Baseball Holdings announced the team would move to San Bernardino and become the Inland Empire 66ers beginning in the 2026 season.

Season	Triple-A	Double-A	High-A	Single-A	Rookie	Foreign Rookie	Ref.
2021	Tacoma Rainiers	Arkansas Travelers	Everett AquaSox	Modesto Nuts	ACL Mariners	DSL Mariners	
2022	Tacoma Rainiers	Arkansas Travelers	Everett AquaSox	Modesto Nuts	ACL Mariners	DSL Mariners	
2023	Tacoma Rainiers	Arkansas Travelers	Everett AquaSox	Modesto Nuts	ACL Mariners	DSL Mariners	
2024	Tacoma Rainiers	Arkansas Travelers	Everett AquaSox	Modesto Nuts	ACL Mariners	DSL Mariners	
2025	Tacoma Rainiers	Arkansas Travelers	Everett AquaSox	Modesto Nuts	ACL Mariners	DSL Mariners	
2026	Tacoma Rainiers	Arkansas Travelers	Everett AquaSox	Inland Empire 66ers	ACL Mariners	DSL Mariners	

== See also ==
- Seattle Mariners minor league players
