= Emerson Hancock =

American baseball player (born 1999)

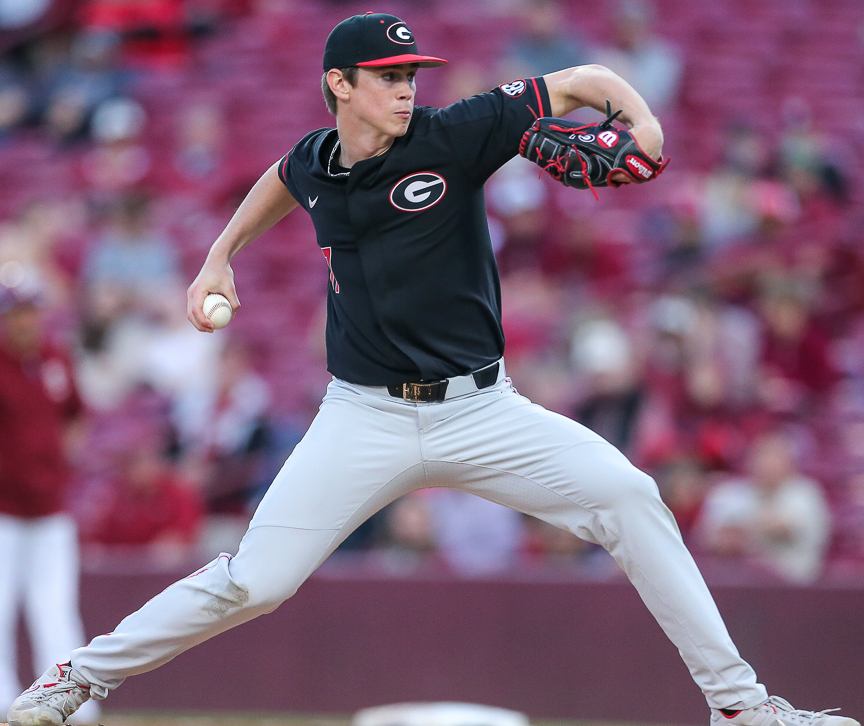
- Hancock with the Georgia Bulldogs in 2019

Seattle Mariners – No. 26
- Pitcher
- Born: May 31, 1999 (age 27); Thomasville, Georgia, U.S.
- Bats: Right Throws: Right

MLB debut
- August 9, 2023, for the Seattle Mariners

MLB statistics (through 2026 season)
- Win–loss record: 15–17
- Earned run average: 4.24
- Strikeouts: 235
- Stats at Baseball Reference

Teams
- Seattle Mariners (2023–present)

Emerson Christian Hancock (born May 31, 1999) is an American professional baseball pitcher for the Seattle Mariners of Major League Baseball (MLB). He played college baseball at Georgia and was selected sixth overall by the Mariners in the 2020 MLB draft. He made his MLB debut in 2023.

== Amateur career ==
Hancock attended Cairo High School in Cairo, Georgia. As a senior, he went 11–1 with 0.75 earned run average (ERA) and 125 strikeouts over 65 innings. He was drafted by the Arizona Diamondbacks in the 38th round of the 2017 Major League Baseball draft but did not sign with the team.

After high school, Hancock played college baseball for the University of Georgia Bulldogs for three years. As a freshman at Georgia in 2018, Hancock started 15 games, going 6–4 with a 5.10 ERA and 75 strikeouts in 77 2/3 innings. As a sophomore in 2019, he went 8–3 in 14 starts with a 1.99 ERA and 97 strikeouts in 90 1/3 innings. He was named a second-team All-American by Baseball America, Collegiate Baseball, D1Baseball, and Perfect Game. After the season, he was invited to play for the USA Baseball Collegiate National Team but was not selected for the team's roster. In 2020, he went 2–0 in four starts before the season was cancelled due to the COVID-19 pandemic. He received the Vince Dooley Athlete Of The Year as the best male Georgia athlete.

== Professional career ==
=== Draft and minor leagues (2020–2023) ===
Hancock was selected sixth overall by the Seattle Mariners in the 2020 Major League Baseball draft. He signed with the Mariners on June 25, 2020, receiving a $5.7 million signing bonus. He reported to the team's alternate training site before the shortened 2020 season but experienced shoulder fatigue after his first throwing session and was shut down for the season.

Hancock made his professional debut in 2021 with the High-A West Everett AquaSox. Hancock was selected for the 2021 All-Star Futures Game, but a shoulder injury kept him out of the game. He was promoted to the Double-A Arkansas Travelers in August. In 12 starts with the two teams, he went 3–1 with a 2.62 ERA and 43 strikeouts over 44 2/3 innings. His season ended in early September due to another shoulder injury. Hancock returned to Arkansas to start 2023, making 20 starts and posting an 11–5 record and 4.32 ERA with 107 strikeouts across 98 innings pitched.

=== Major leagues (2023–present) ===
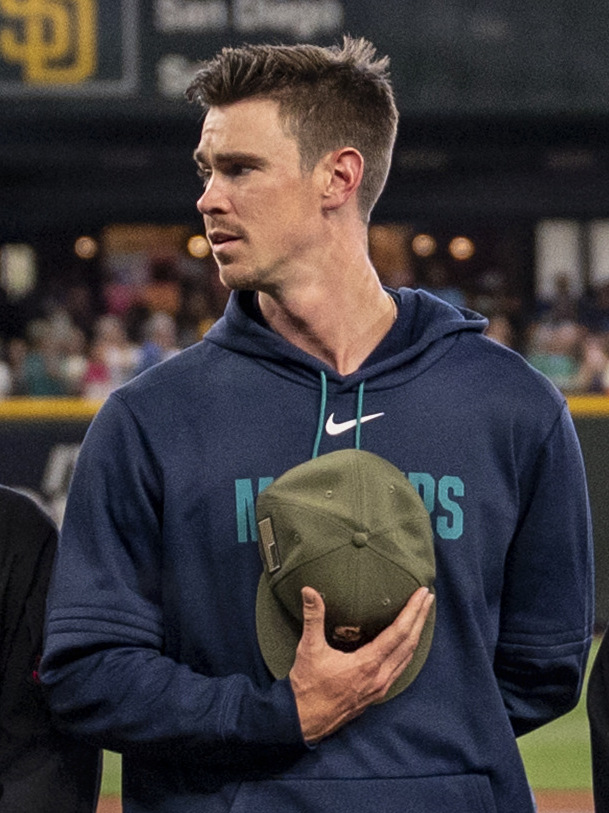
Hancock with the Mariners in 2026

On August 9, 2023, the Mariners selected Hancock's contract and promoted him to the major leagues. He made his MLB debut that night starting against the San Diego Padres. He pitched 5 innings, giving up 2 hits, 1 earned run, and 3 walks with 3 strikeouts. On August 20, Hancock was removed from a start against the Houston Astros with a right shoulder strain. He was placed on the injured list on August 21, and one day later, he was transferred to the 60-day injured list, again ending his season early. In three starts for Seattle in 2023, he had a 4.50 ERA with 6 strikeouts in 12 innings pitched.

Hancock was the Mariners sixth starter in 2024, splitting time between the Mariners, the Triple-A Tacoma Rainiers, and the injured list. He was in the starting rotation on Opening Day and made seven starts with a 5.24 ERA before being optioned to Tacoma on May 8, just before Bryan Woo made his season debut. Hancock returned to Seattle on June 13 for a spot start, allowing two runs in 7 innings before being abruptly sent back to the minors. He returned to Seattle for another spot start on July 6, taking the loss after 4 innings of work, and was again ticketed back to Tacoma. He returned to the Mariners on September 13, filling in for the injured Luis Castillo. In three starts to close out the year, Hancock had a 4.70 ERA in 15 1/3 innings. He finished the season with a 4–4 record with a 4.75 ERA and 39 strikeouts in 60 2/3 innings.

Hancock split 2025 between Seattle and Tacoma. He failed to finish the first inning in his first start. He was demoted in early July after going 3–5 with a 5.47 ERA in 15 starts. He returned to the majors at the end of August as a reliever. He went 1–0 with a 1.42 ERA in 7 relief appearances. In his first MLB postseason, he allowed two runs and five walks in four innings pitched in the American League Championship Series.

Hancock returned to the rotation to begin 2026, and was more effective to begin the season. He had lowered his arm slot down to sidearm, changed how he threw his sinker, and began throwing more sweepers and four-seam fastballs. Hancock had a then-best 9 strikeouts and no hits in 6 innings in a win over the Cleveland Guardians, then a 14-strikeout, no-walk outing on May 2, squandered by Seattle in a loss to the Kansas City Royals. He had the most strikeouts in an MLB game since teammate George Kirby struck out 14 in September 2025. Unlike his role as a spot starter in prior years, Hancock remained in the rotation once Bryce Miller returned from the injured list, and Seattle used six starters.

== Personal life ==
Hancock and his wife were married on November 18, 2023.
