= Jhonathan Díaz =

Venezuelan baseball player (born 1996)

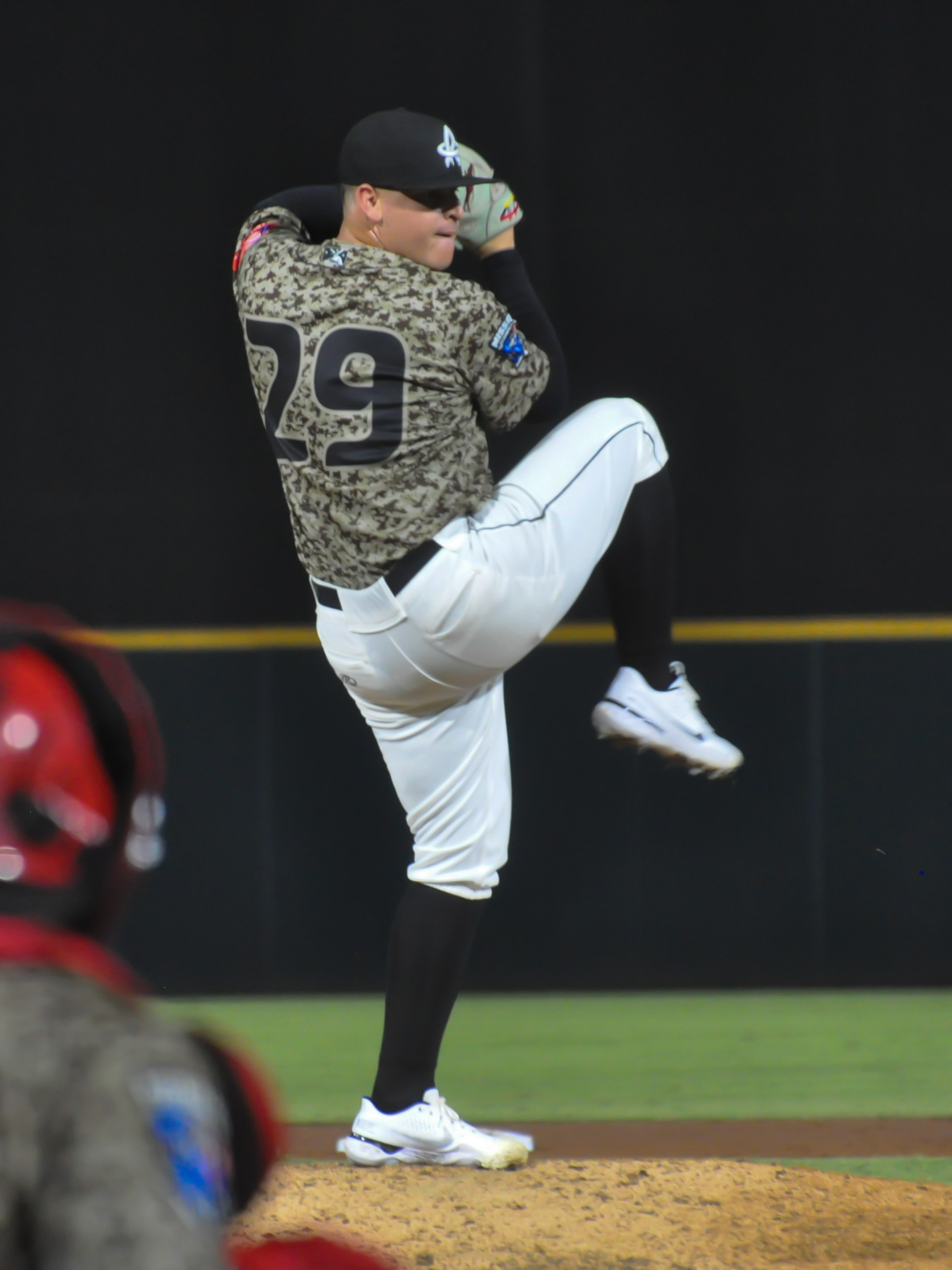
- Díaz with the Rocket City Trash Pandas

Free agent
- Pitcher
- Born: September 13, 1996 (age 30); Valencia, Venezuela
- Bats: Left Throws: Left

MLB debut
- September 17, 2021, for the Los Angeles Angels

MLB statistics (through 2026 season)
- Win–loss record: 2–2
- Earned run average: 4.72
- Strikeouts: 34
- Stats at Baseball Reference

Teams
- Los Angeles Angels (2021–2023); Seattle Mariners (2024–2026)
Medals
Men's baseball
Representing Venezuela
World Baseball Classic
Gold medal – first place	2026 Miami	Team

Jhonathan Alexander Díaz (born September 13, 1996) is a Venezuelan professional baseball pitcher who is a free agent. He has previously played in Major League Baseball (MLB) for the Los Angeles Angels and Seattle Mariners. Díaz signed with the Boston Red Sox as an international free agent in 2013.

== Career ==
=== Boston Red Sox ===
Díaz signed with the Boston Red Sox as an international free agent on August 9, 2013, for a $600,000 signing bonus. When he signed, he could throw almost as fast as a right-handed pitcher, though he has not been a switch pitcher professionally. He spent his professional debut season of 2014 with the Dominican Summer League Red Sox, going 6–2 with a 1.63 ERA over 66 1/3 innings. He did not play in 2015 due to a knee injury. He spent the 2016 season with the GCL Red Sox, going 4–4 with a 2.85 ERA with 57 strikeouts over 60 innings. He advanced to the High-A Greenville Drive in 2017, going 6–6 with a 4.57 ERA with 80 strikeouts over 88 2/3 innings. Díaz returned to Greenville in 2018, making one start for the Salem Red Sox in June. He was a combined 11–9 with a 3.09 ERA with 151 strikeouts over 157 1/3 innings in 2019. Díaz spent the 2019 season with Salem, going 9–8 with a 3.86 ERA and 118 strikeouts over 128 1/3 innings. He played for the Peoria Javelinas in the Arizona Fall League following the 2019 season.

Díaz did not play in 2020 due to the cancellation of the Minor League Baseball season because of the COVID-19 pandemic. He elected free agency on November 2, 2020.

=== Los Angeles Angels ===
On November 17, 2020, Díaz signed a minor league contract with the Los Angeles Angels. He started the 2021 season with the Double-A Rocket City Trash Pandas before being promoted to the Triple-A Salt Lake Bees in late August. He was a combined 5–6 with a 4.01 ERA and 92 strikeouts over 76 1/3 innings in the minors.

On September 17, 2021, Díaz was promoted to the major leagues for the first time. He made his MLB debut that night versus the Oakland Athletics, allowing 2 runs while not finishing the second inning. He was promoted because Shohei Ohtani's scheduled start was delayed. In 3 appearances during his debut campaign, Díaz allowed 6 runs on 11 hits with 9 strikeouts in 13 innings pitched.

Díaz split time in 2022 between Anaheim and Salt Lake before an oblique injury ended his season in mid-June. In 4 games (3 starts) for the Angels, he recorded a 2.93 ERA with 11 strikeouts across 15 1/3 innings of work. He was placed on Salt Lake's injured list on August 3 before moving to the Angels' 60-day injured list on September 4. On November 18, Díaz was designated for assignment by the Angels. The team non-tendered him on the same day, making him a free agent.

On December 15, 2022, Díaz re-signed with the Angels on a minor league contract. In 38 appearances for Triple-A Salt Lake in 2003, he had a 9–2 record and 4.55 ERA with 79 strikeouts in 87 innings. On September 7, the Angels promoted Díaz. In 4 appearances for the Angels, he struggled to a 10.29 ERA with 4 strikeouts in 7 innings. Following the season on October 16, Díaz was removed from the 40-man roster. He elected free agency following the season on November 6.

=== Seattle Mariners ===
On January 9, 2024, Díaz signed a minor league contract with the Seattle Mariners. He started the season with the Triple-A Tacoma Rainiers and was named the Pacific Coast League Pitcher of the Month for April. On May 22, the Mariners added Díaz to their 40-man roster and optioned him back to Tacoma. The roster move prevented Díaz from exercising an opt-out clause in his contract. On June 11, the Mariners called up Díaz to replace scratched starter Bryan Woo. After allowing 3 runs in 5 1/3 innings, he was sent back down to Tacoma. He was called up by the Mariners three more times in 2024 and pitched in four games in relief in the second half of the season. He finished the year with an 0–1 record, a 4.66 ERA, and 8 strikeouts in 9 2/3 innings for the Mariners. Díaz also had his most durable and effective Triple-A season yet, going 9–3 with a 4.36 ERA and 120 strikeouts in 117 2/3 innings for Tacoma.

Díaz pitched for the Cangrejeros de Santurce in the Puerto Rican winter league. He was named the league's pitcher of the year after going 4–0 with a 0.49 ERA in six starts. Díaz was designated for assignment by the Mariners on February 3, 2025. He elected free agency in lieu of an outright assignment on February 7. Díaz re-signed with Seattle on a minor league contract on February 12. On April 1, the Mariners selected Díaz's contract, adding him to their active roster. He pitched a scoreless 1 1/3 innings in a loss to the Detroit Tigers that night, his only major league appearance of the season. He was sent down to Triple-A two days later. He returned to the majors for six days in May, but didn't pitch in a game. In the minors, he was a postseason Pacific Coast League All-Star, leading the league with a 4.15 ERA and collecting 11 wins, tied for most in the league.

Díaz was designated for assignment by Seattle on January 23, 2026. He cleared waivers and was sent outright to Triple-A Tacoma on January 28. Díaz elected free agency the following day. On February 10, Díaz re-signed with the Mariners organization on a minor league contract. He had his contract selected to the major league roster on August 19. Díaz made his season debut the following day, pitching 1 1/3 innings of relief in a 4–7 loss to the Milwaukee Brewers. He was designated for assignment by Seattle on August 22. Díaz cleared waivers and was sent outright to Triple–A Tacoma two days later. He elected free agency on November 2.
