= Jonatan Clase =

Dominican baseball player (born 2002)

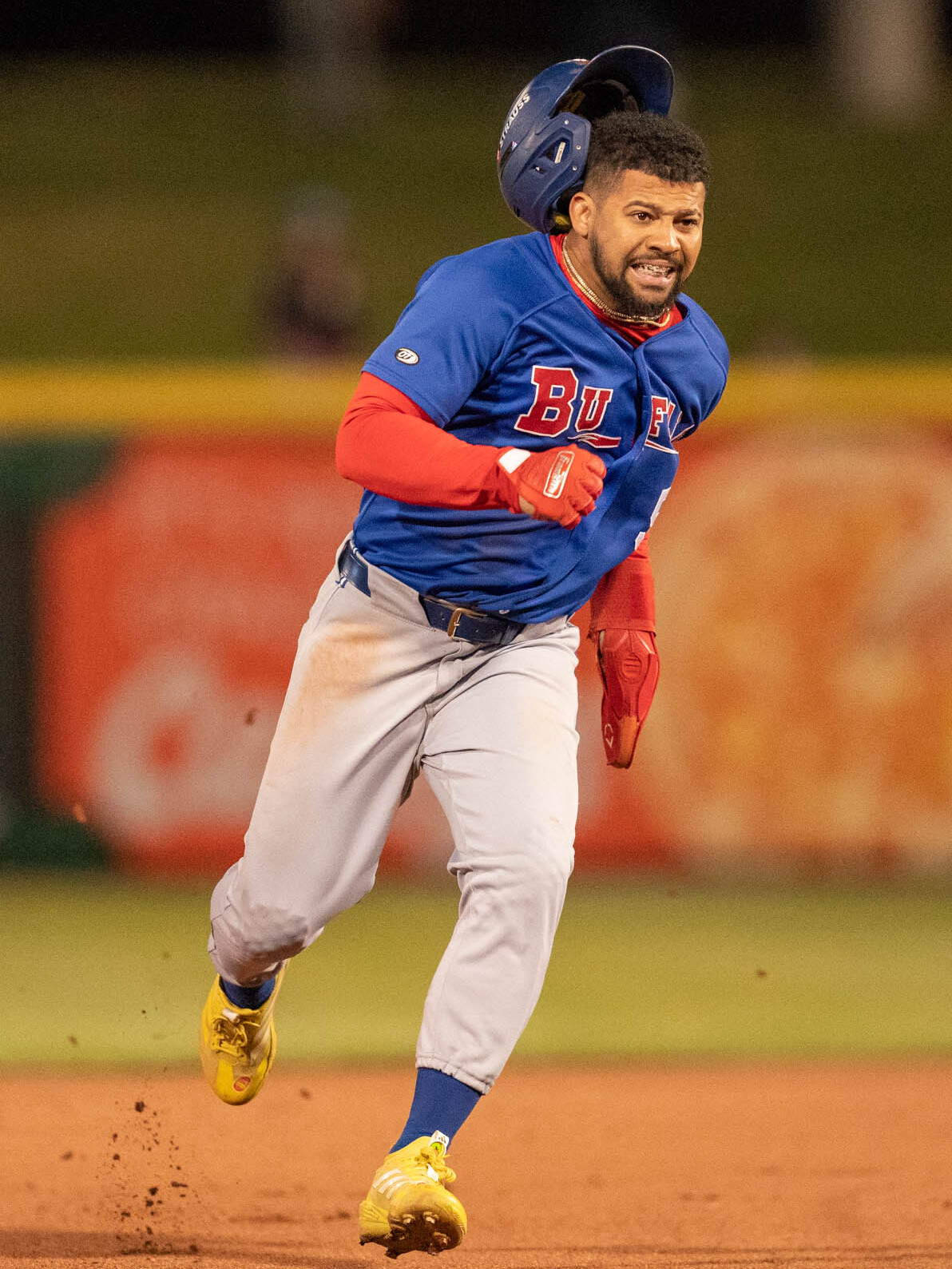
- Clase with the Buffalo Bisons in 2026

Toronto Blue Jays – No. 8
- Outfielder
- Born: May 23, 2002 (age 24); Santo Domingo, Dominican Republic
- Bats: Switch Throws: Right

MLB debut
- April 15, 2024, for the Seattle Mariners

MLB statistics (through 2026 season)
- Batting average: .230
- Home runs: 5
- Runs batted in: 20
- Stats at Baseball Reference

Teams
- Seattle Mariners (2024); Toronto Blue Jays (2024–present)

Jonatan Clase (born May 23, 2002) is a Dominican professional baseball outfielder for the Toronto Blue Jays of Major League Baseball (MLB). He has previously played in MLB for the Seattle Mariners.

== Career ==
=== Seattle Mariners ===
Clase signed with the Seattle Mariners as an international free agent on July 2, 2018. He made his professional debut in 2019 with the Dominican Summer League Mariners. Clase did not play in a game in 2020 due to the cancellation of the minor league season because of the COVID-19 pandemic.

Clase returned to action in 2021 with the rookie-level Arizona Complex League Mariners. He played in 14 games for the team, missing time due to a broken ankle, and batted .245/.333/.388 with two home runs, 10 RBI, and 16 stolen bases. Clase spent the 2022 campaign with the Single-A Modesto Nuts, slashing .267/.374/.463 with 13 home runs, 49 RBI, and 55 stolen bases. On November 15, the Mariners added him to their 40-man roster to protect him from the Rule 5 draft.

The Mariners optioned Clase to the High-A Everett AquaSox to begin the 2023 season. In 129 games split between Everett and the Double-A Arkansas Travelers, he batted .242/.353/.449 with 20 home runs, 68 RBI, and 79 stolen bases. He was the first minor league player since at least 1961 to have at least 20 home runs and 70 stolen bases in a season. He also played in the All-Star Futures Game. He began working with former Mariner Franklin Gutiérrez to improve his outfield defense.

Clase was optioned to the Triple-A Tacoma Rainiers to begin the 2024 season. On April 15, Clase was promoted to the major leagues for the first time following an injury to Dominic Canzone. Clase had a single and RBI in his MLB debut, a win over the Cincinnati Reds. In three stints in the majors with the Mariners, he batted .195/.233/.220 with 1 double and three stolen bases.

=== Toronto Blue Jays ===
On July 26, 2024, Seattle traded Clase and Jacob Sharp to the Toronto Blue Jays in exchange for reliever Yimi García. In seven games for the Blue Jays, he went 7-for-20 (.350) with one home run and two RBI. He was tied for the third-fastest base runner in the majors, according to Statcast.

Clase was optioned to the Triple-A Buffalo Bisons to begin the 2025 season. He returned to the majors in May, replacing Alan Roden on the roster. Facing the St. Louis Cardinals on June 9, Clase hit his first home run of the season to tie the game in the 9th inning of a Jays win. Clase suffered a bruised right knee after Arizona Diamondbacks pitcher Brandon Pfaadt hit him in the knee with a pitch on June 17. He made 34 appearances for Toronto during the regular season, batting .210/.288/.300 with two home runs, nine RBI, and three stolen bases.

Clase was again optioned to Triple-A Buffalo to begin the 2026 season. He hit .223/.321/.359 with five home runs and 17 stolen bases to start the season in Buffalo. Clase was called up on July 1 after George Springer was placed on the paternity list. He started off strong with the Jays, going 5–for–16 with two home runs and six RBI over his first five starts. Clase was placed on the 10–day injured list due to left plantar fasciitis on July 21 after injuring himself running during pre-game warm-ups. He was transferred to the 60–day injured list on August 27, and would not play again in 2026.
