= Collin Snider =

American baseball player (born 1995)

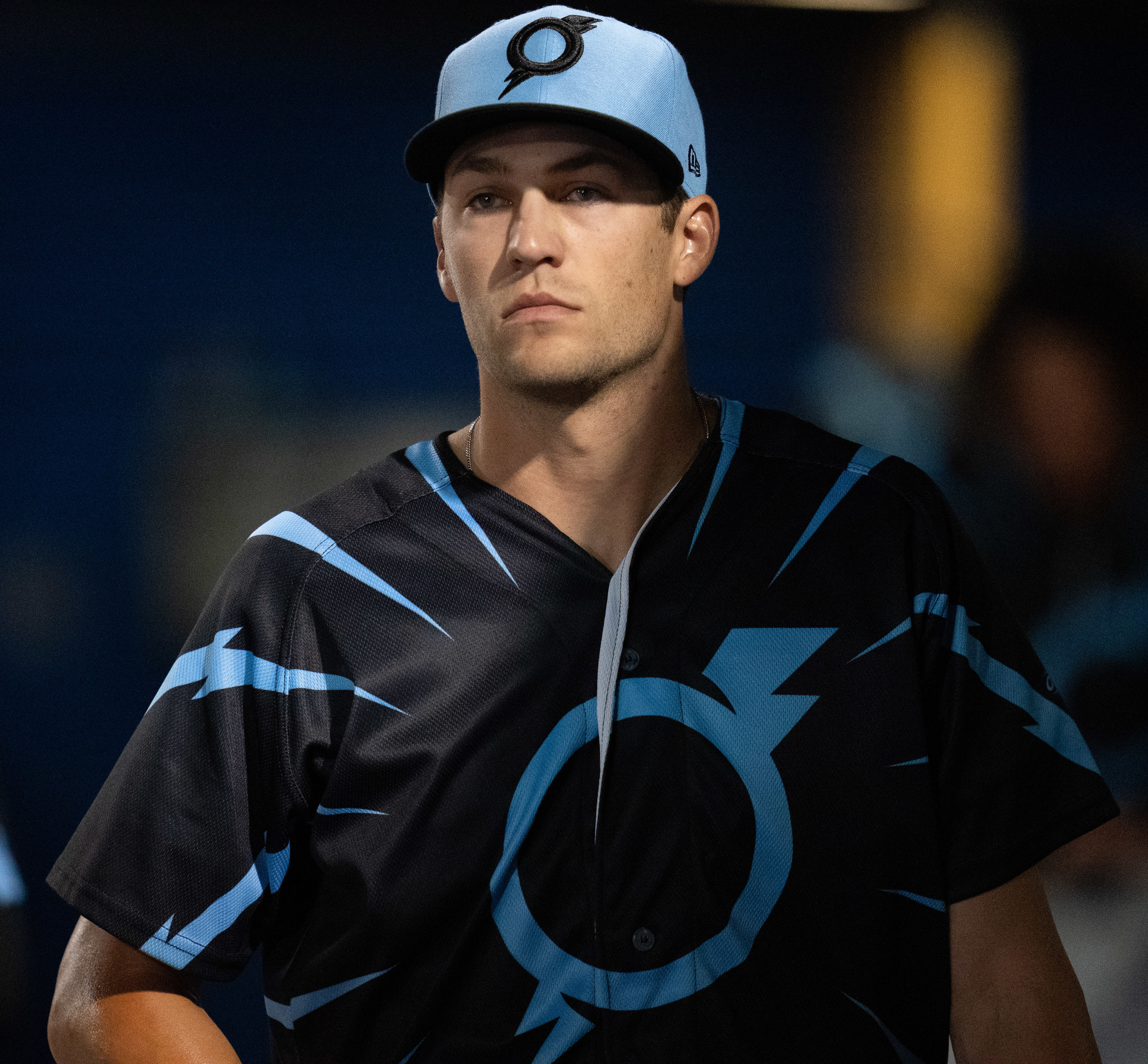
- Snider with the Omaha Storm Chasers in 2021

Free agent
- Pitcher
- Born: October 10, 1995 (age 31); Nashville, Tennessee, U.S.
- Bats: Right Throws: Right

MLB debut
- April 9, 2022, for the Kansas City Royals

MLB statistics (through 2025 season)
- Win–loss record: 9–7
- Earned run average: 4.48
- Strikeouts: 104
- Stats at Baseball Reference

Teams
- Kansas City Royals (2022–2023); Seattle Mariners (2024–2025)

Collin Kenneth Snider (born October 10, 1995) is an American professional baseball pitcher who is a free agent. He has previously played in Major League Baseball (MLB) for the Kansas City Royals and Seattle Mariners.

== Amateur career ==
Snider played four years of high school baseball at Riverdale High School in Murfreesboro, Tennessee. His team was district and regional champs from 2012 to 2014. He pitched a perfect game in 2014.

Snider played college baseball at Vanderbilt University. In three seasons as a reliever for the Commodores, he had a 7–2 record with a 3.62 ERA and 68 strikeouts in 87 innings pitched. His college teammates included future MLB All-Stars Walker Buehler, Bryan Reynolds, and Dansby Swanson. Snider's coaches at Vanderbilt praised his sinker, calling it "disgusting" and a "unicorn" due to its extreme movement that was difficult for batters to hit into the air.

After his second year of college in 2016, Snider played collegiate summer baseball with the Yarmouth–Dennis Red Sox of the Cape Cod Baseball League.

== Professional career ==
=== Kansas City Royals ===
2017–2021: drafted and minor leagues

The Kansas City Royals selected Snider in the 12th round of the 2017 Major League Baseball draft. Snider debuted that June with the rookie-level Burlington Royals, moving up to the Single-A Lexington Legends in August. He had a cumulative 3.21 ERA in 17 appearances with both teams in 2017. Snider returned to Lexington in 2018, posting a 5.57 ERA with 50 strikeouts in 76 innings of work across 29 games. In 2019, Snider split the year between the rookie-level Arizona League Royals and the High-A Wilmington Blue Rocks, recording a 2.24 ERA with 34 strikeouts in 31 games between the two teams.

Snider did not pitch in a game in 2020 due to the cancellation of the minor league season because of the COVID-19 pandemic. That year, he trained at his former high school and college in Tennessee. In 2021, Snider pitched for the Double-A Northwest Arkansas Naturals and the Triple-A Omaha Storm Chasers, registering a 4.48 ERA with 64 strikeouts in 66 1/3 innings pitched across 48 total appearances. The Royals added Snider to their 40-man roster after the season on November 19.

==== 2022–2023 MLB debut and time in Triple-A ====
Snider made the Royals 2022 Opening Day roster to begin the 2022 season. In his Royals debut, he threw a scoreless tenth inning and picked his first MLB win and strikeout, with 11 family members watching. He was sent down to Triple-A in mid-June for two months, returning to the Royals on August 20. Snider made 42 appearances for Kansas City in his rookie campaign, registering a 4–2 record and 6.55 ERA with 22 strikeouts in 34 1/3 innings pitched.

Snider was optioned to Triple-A Omaha to begin the 2023 season. He was called up to Kansas City for the first two weeks of July, pitching in five games, then rejoined the Royals near the end of August. In 30 games for the Royals in 2023, he had a 4.87 ERA with 11 strikeouts across 20 1/3 innings of work. On December 11, Snider was designated for assignment as the Royals added reliever Will Smith to their roster.

On December 18, 2023, Snider was claimed off waivers by the Arizona Diamondbacks; however, he was designated for assignment on January 30, 2024 to make room for Joc Pederson on the roster.

=== Seattle Mariners ===
On February 6, 2024, the Seattle Mariners claimed Snider. He pitched much better with the Mariners, going 3–4 with a 1.94 ERA and 47 strikeouts in 41 2/3 innings. He was on the Mariners' Opening Day roster but went on the injured list on April 8 with a knee contusion. He was sent down to the Triple-A Tacoma Rainiers immediately after coming off the injured list later in April but returned to the majors in early June. Snider changed his pitch mix in 2024, favoring a four-seam fastball and sweeper rather than the sinker and slider he used with the Royals. His cutter remained his third most common pitch. He also consistently threw first-pitch strikes, starting with a strike to 73 percent of batters faced, which ranked second among MLB pitchers who threw at least 40 innings in 2024 and is in the top 10 among single season performances since at least 2002.

Snider made 24 appearances for the Mariners in 2025, registering a 2-1 record and 5.47 ERA with 24 strikeouts across 26 1/3 innings pitched. Snider was designated for assignment by Seattle following the acquisition of Caleb Ferguson on July 30, 2025. He cleared waivers and was sent outright to Triple-A Tacoma on August 3. Snider elected free agency following the season on November 6.

=== Chicago Cubs ===
On December 11, 2025, Snider signed a minor league contract with the Chicago Cubs. In 36 games with Triple-A Iowa Cubs he threw 40.1 innings of relief going 2-1 with a 9.15 ERA and 35 strikeouts with one save. He elected free agency on November 2.

== Personal life ==
Snider and his wife Rachel married in 2019. They were high school sweethearts. They have a golden retriever named Jax.

Snider spoke at the funeral of Vanderbilt teammate Donny Everett, who drowned in 2016. Snider has Everett's initials and number stitched on his baseball glove.

Snider's parents, Jerry and Cheri Snider, and siblings Danielle, Spencer, Andrew, and Zachary, are all athletic. Cheri Snider was diagnosed with breast cancer in June 2021.

In college, Snider said his favorite baseball team was the Atlanta Braves and his favorite player was David Price, who is also from Murfreesboro and pitched for Vanderbilt.
