= Troy Taylor (baseball) =

American baseball player (born 2001)

Seattle Mariners – No. 59
- Pitcher
- Born: September 9, 2001 (age 25); Fontana, California, U.S.
- Bats: Right Throws: Right

MLB debut
- August 11, 2024, for the Seattle Mariners

MLB statistics (through 2026 season)
- Win–loss record: 0–0
- Earned run average: 6.21
- Strikeouts: 29
- Stats at Baseball Reference

Teams
- Seattle Mariners (2024–present)

Troy Jonathan Taylor (born September 9, 2001) is an American professional baseball pitcher for the Seattle Mariners of Major League Baseball (MLB). He made his MLB debut in 2024.

== Amateur career ==
Taylor graduated in 2019 from Los Osos High School in Rancho Cucamonga, California. He was the team MVP and an all-league player in his senior season of baseball. He played college baseball for the Cal State Long Beach in 2020, where he converted to being a pitcher and pitched in one game, allowing a run while recording four outs in a loss to Mississippi State. After one year at Long Beach, Taylor transferred to Cypress College. After his lone year at Cypress, he pitched for the Williamsport Crosscutters in the MLB Draft League, being named the team's pitcher of the year. He led the league with 52 2/3 innings pitched. The Seattle Mariners selected him in the 20th round of the 2021 Major League Baseball draft, but he did not sign with the team. He transferred to UC Irvine for the 2022 college season, leading the Anteaters with 6 saves.

== Professional career ==
=== 2022–2024: Draft and minor leagues ===
Taylor was selected by the Mariners in the 12th round of the 2022 MLB draft, this time signing with the team with a $125,000 signing bonus. Taylor made his professional debut in April 2023 with the Single-A Modesto Nuts. In August, he was promoted to the High-A Everett AquaSox. In 40 appearances with the two affiliates, he had a 3.38 ERA with 62 strikeouts and 3 saves across 45 1/3 innings pitched. He then pitched for the Peoria Javelinas in the Arizona Fall League, picking up 1 win and 1 save in nine appearances. He was selected for the 2023 Fall Stars Game.

Taylor returned to Everett to start 2024 before being promoted to the Double-A Arkansas Travelers in May. He earned 21 saves in 40 minor league games, with a 3–4 record and 1.69 ERA in 42 2/3 innings.

=== 2024: MLB debut ===
On August 10, 2024, Taylor was selected to the 40-man roster and promoted to the major leagues. Taylor made his MLB debut with the Mariners the next day, striking out two New York Mets batters and walking one in the ninth inning of a 12–1 win. He gave up his first MLB home run to Javier Báez of the Detroit Tigers in his next appearance on August 13. Taylor earned his first MLB save on September 27, recovering from allowing a leadoff double and throwing a wild pitch to recording three consecutive outs against the Oakland Athletics.

Taylor, pitching primarily as a seventh inning reliever, finished his first MLB season with a 3.72 ERA and 25 strikeouts in 19 1/3 innings. Taylor's fastball averaged 97 miles per hour, which was in the top 10 percent of MLB pitchers. The spin on his fastball was in the top 15 percent of pitchers. His main secondary pitch was a sweeper, which was a slightly below average pitch, according to Statcast.

=== 2025–present ===
Taylor suffered a lat strain in January 2025, which Mariners general manager Jerry Dipoto said could delay his start of the 2025 season. He made eight appearances for Seattle during the regular season, recording a 12.15 ERA with two strikeouts across 6 2/3 innings pitched.

Taylor was optioned to Triple-A Tacoma to begin the 2026 season.

== Personal life ==
Taylor's parents are Earl and Susan Taylor. He has an older sister, Jenna, who is an accountant.
