= Ryne Stanek =

American baseball player (born 1991)

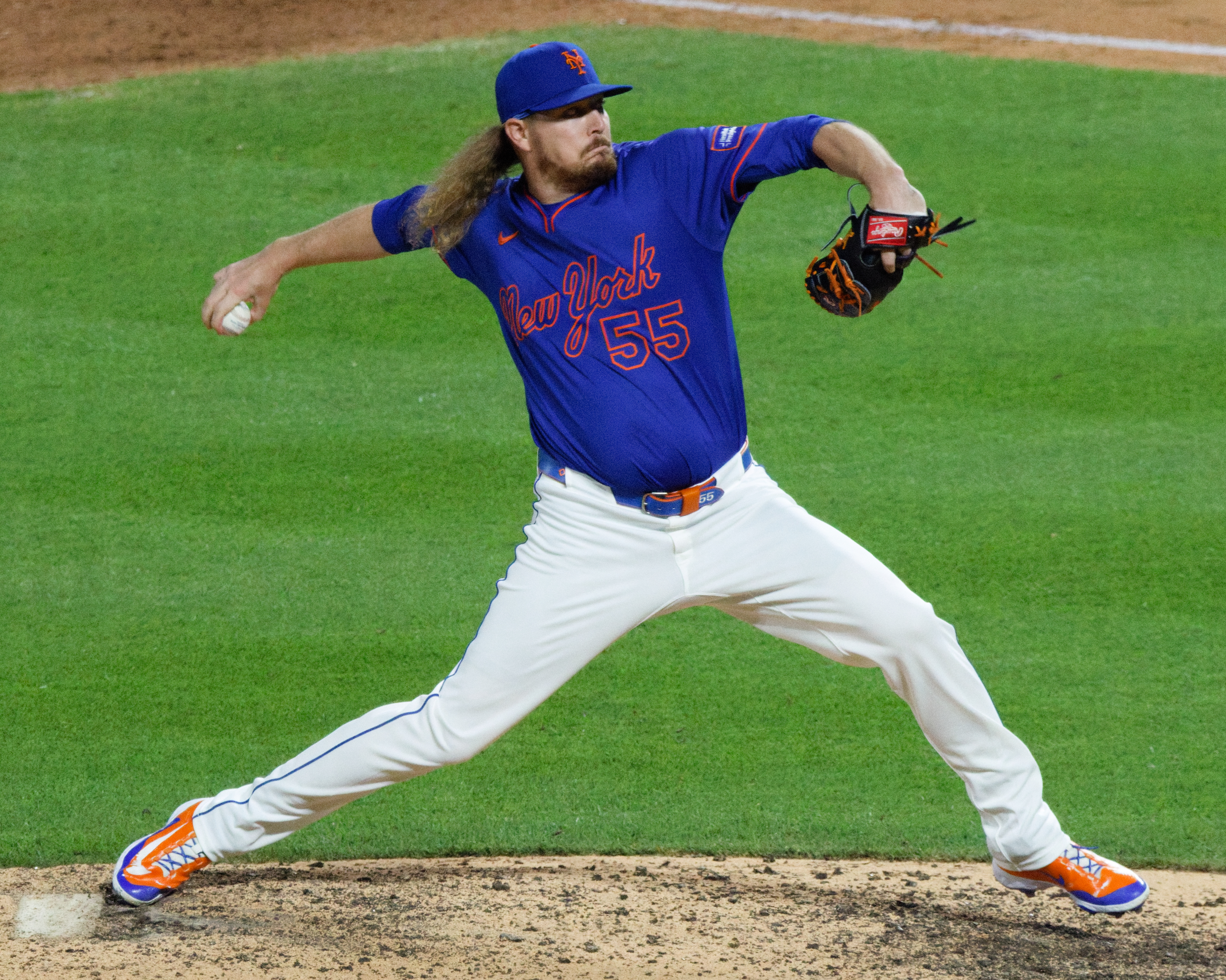
- Stanek with the Mets in 2025

Free agent
- Pitcher
- Born: July 26, 1991 (age 35); St. Louis, Missouri, U.S.
- Bats: Right Throws: Right

MLB debut
- May 14, 2017, for the Tampa Bay Rays

MLB statistics (through 2026 season)
- Win–loss record: 23–26
- Earned run average: 3.87
- Strikeouts: 596
- Stats at Baseball Reference

Teams
- Tampa Bay Rays (2017–2019); Miami Marlins (2019–2020); Houston Astros (2021–2023); Seattle Mariners (2024); New York Mets (2024–2025); St. Louis Cardinals (2026)

Career highlights and awards
- World Series champion (2022)
Medals
Men's baseball
Representing the United States
Haarlem Baseball Week
Bronze medal – third place	2012	Team

Ryne Thomas Stanek (born July 26, 1991) is an American professional baseball pitcher who is a free agent. He has previously played in MLB for the Tampa Bay Rays, Miami Marlins, Houston Astros, Seattle Mariners, New York Mets, and St. Louis Cardinals.

Stanek attended the University of Arkansas, where he played for the Arkansas Razorbacks baseball team. He was selected by the Rays in the first round of the 2013 MLB draft. He made his MLB debut in 2017. Stanek often appeared as an opener, before the Rays traded him to the Marlins in 2019. He pitched for the Astros from 2021 to 2023, winning the 2022 World Series. Stanek signed as a free agent with the Mariners in 2024 and was then traded to the Mets during the season. He signed with the Cardinals in 2026.

== Amateur career ==
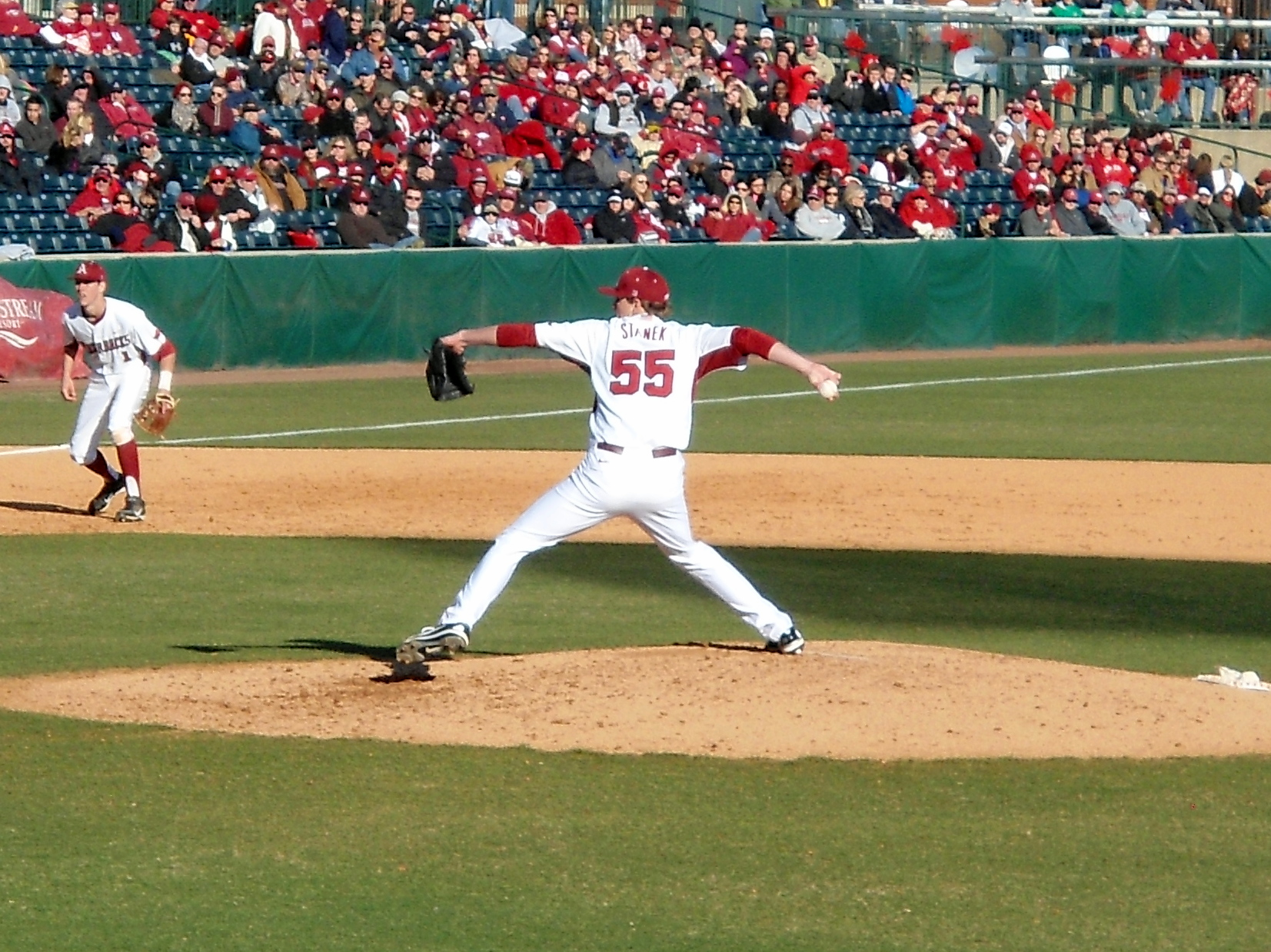
Stanek with the Arkansas Razorbacks in 2013

Stanek attended Blue Valley High School in Stilwell, Kansas. As a senior, Stanek pitched to a 5–1 win–loss record, a 0.72 earned run average (ERA), and 71 strikeouts. Out of high school, Baseball America ranked Stanek as the 42nd-best available player in the 2010 Major League Baseball draft. The Seattle Mariners selected Stanek in the third round, with the 99th overall selection, but he did not sign.

Stanek then attended the University of Arkansas to play college baseball for the Arkansas Razorbacks. In 2011, he played collegiate summer baseball with the Bourne Braves of the Cape Cod Baseball League. As a sophomore in 2012, Stanek pitched to an 8–4 record with a 2.82 ERA and 83 strikeouts in 92 2/3 innings pitched. He was named to the All-Tournament Team in the 2012 Houston College Classic. That summer, he played with the United States collegiate national team. In 14 2/3 innings, he had a 3.07 ERA with the national team, which finished third at the Haarlem Baseball Week.

Prior to the 2013 season, Stanek was named a pre-season All-American by Baseball America, Perfect Game, and Collegiate Baseball, and the Southeastern Conference (SEC) Pre-season Pitcher of the Year. On March 25, Stanek was named the SEC Pitcher of the Week. He finished his junior year with a 10–2 record, a 1.39 ERA, 79 strikeouts, and 41 walks in 97 1/3 innings. In his three years at Arkansas, he compiled a 22–8 record and a 2.55 ERA.

== Professional career ==
=== Tampa Bay Rays ===
==== Draft and minor leagues (2013–2017) ====
Stanek was considered one of the top available prospects in the 2013 MLB draft, and was selected by the Tampa Bay Rays with the 29th pick in the first round. Stanek signed with the Rays for a $1,758,300 signing bonus. He did not pitch professionally immediately after he signed, as he had surgery on his right acetabular labrum during the 2013–14 offseason, which led to him missing the start of the 2014 season. He made his professional debut with the Bowling Green Hot Rods of the Single-A Midwest League on May 8, 2014. After pitching to a 3–4 record and a 3.63 ERA for Bowling Green, the Rays promoted Stanek to the Charlotte Stone Crabs of the High-A Florida State League in July.

Stanek began the 2015 season with Charlotte, and was later promoted to the Montgomery Biscuits of the Double-A Southern League. Stanek finished 2015 with a combined 8–5 record with a 3.04 ERA between the two clubs. He returned to Montgomery in 2016 and later joined the Durham Bulls of the Triple-A International League; he posted a combined 4–10 record with a 4.30 ERA between Montgomery and Durham. He was named to appear in the 2016 All-Star Futures Game. The Rays added him to their 40-man roster after the season. He began the 2017 season with Durham.

==== Major leagues (2017–2019) ====
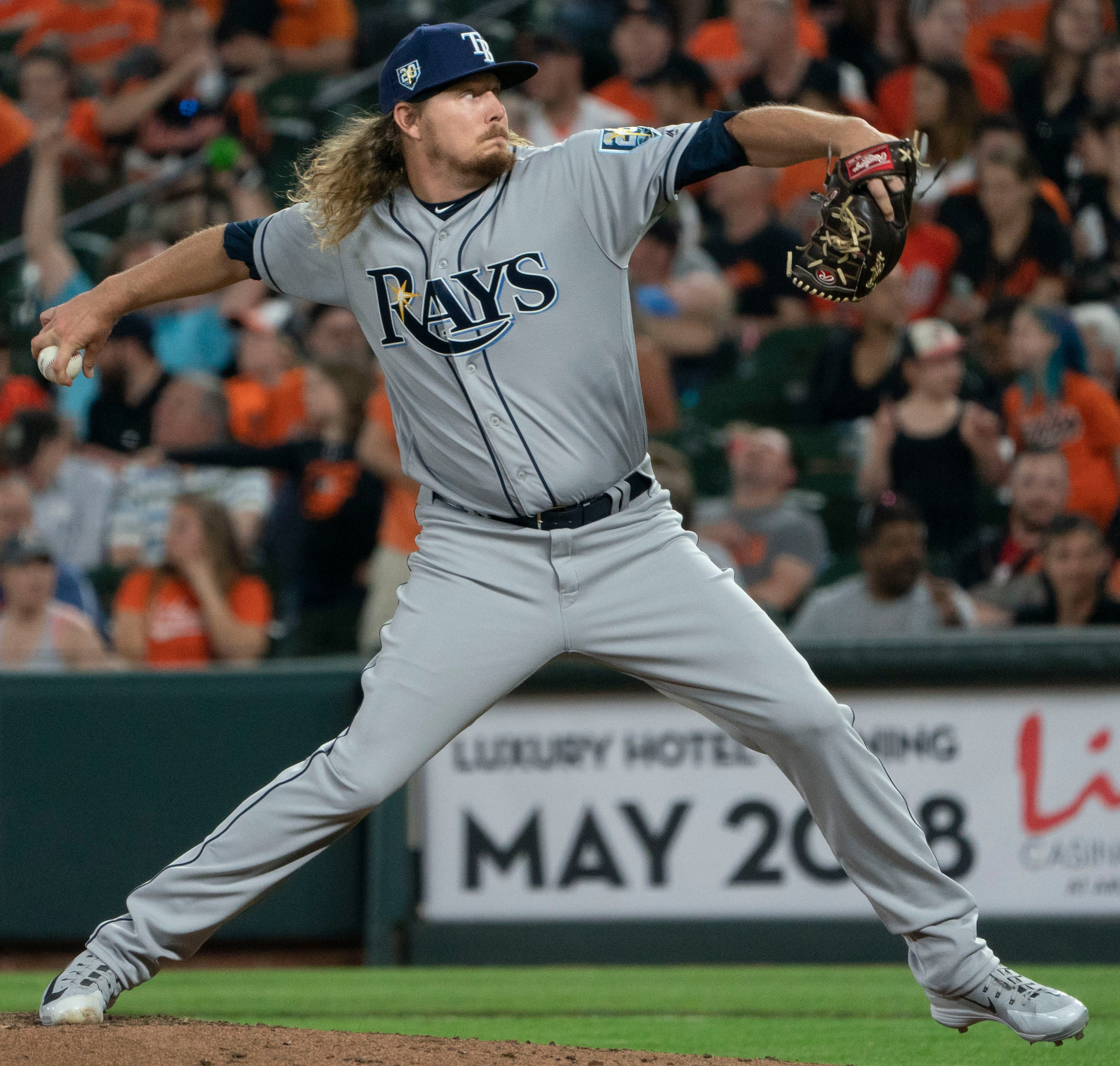
Stanek with the Rays in 2018

The Rays promoted Stanek to the major leagues on May 13, 2017. He made his major league debut the next day. He ended the season with a 5.85 ERA in 21 appearances.

In 2018, Stanek found a niche spot working as an opener, where he found immediate success with his high 90s fastball and newly introduced splitter. In June, Stanek technically set an MLB record by throwing seven consecutive scoreless starts. However, he pitched a mere 9 2/3 innings across those seven starts. In a similar vein, Stanek set a major league record with 17 straight starts allowing one run or fewer. On September 5, Stanek became the first rookie in 75 years to start in back-to-back games. For most of the season, Stanek was used as one of the Rays' opener starters, making 59 total appearances (29 starts). In 66 1/3 innings, he struck out 81 batters and recorded a 2.98 ERA.

The following season, the Rays continued using Stanek as an opener. He hit the disabled list on July 20, 2019, with a hip injury. He had appeared in 41 games, 27 of them starts, in 55 2/3 innings.

=== Miami Marlins ===
On July 31, 2019, the Rays traded Stanek and Jesús Sánchez to the Miami Marlins for pitchers Nick Anderson and Trevor Richards. On August 4, 2020, Stanek was placed on the injured list after contracting COVID-19, returning a month later on September 4. In the shortened regular season, Stanek pitched to a 7.20 ERA in nine relief appearances for the Marlins. He also pitched two scoreless innings in a loss to the Atlanta Braves in the National League Division Series. On December 2, Stanek was non-tendered by the Marlins.

=== Houston Astros ===
On January 7, 2021, Stanek signed a one-year, $1.1 million contract with the Houston Astros. In 2021, he posted a 3–5 record, two saves, and a 3.42 ERA over 72 relief appearances.

Stanek avoided arbitration with the Astros on March 22, 2022, agreeing to a $2.1 million contract for the season. He earned his only save of the season on April 27 against the Texas Rangers, allowing one run one in the ninth and leaving runners stranded on second and third to close out a 4–3 win. After entering the July 22 game against the Seattle Mariners with the bases loaded and tying run aboard, Stanek closed out the inning en route to a 5–2 Astros win and extended a personal scoreless inning streak to 27. Stanek had 10 consecutive scoreless appearances until September 25, when the Baltimore Orioles scored a run in the eighth inning. In the 2022 season finale versus the Philadelphia Phillies, Stanek pitched a clean seventh to lower his ERA to 1.15, eclipsing the single-season franchise record for relievers set by Will Harris in 2019. He ended the regular season with a 2–1 record and one save in 54 2/3 innings over 59 relief appearances. The Astros won the World Series, defeating the Phillies to give Stanek his first career World Series title. He threw four scoreless innings in the postseason.

On January 13, 2023, Stanek agreed to a one-year, $3.6 million contract with the Astros, avoiding salary arbitration. In 55 games for Houston in 2023, he posted a 4.09 ERA with 51 strikeouts across 50^{2}/_{3} innings pitched.

=== Seattle Mariners ===
On March 10, 2024, Stanek signed a one-year, $4 million contract with the Seattle Mariners. In 46 appearances with the Mariners, he was 6–3 with 7 saves and a 4.38 ERA in 39 innings.

=== New York Mets ===
On July 26, 2024, the Mariners traded Stanek to the New York Mets in exchange for minor league prospect Rhylan Thomas. Across 17 games in the regular season for the Mets in 2024, Stanek posted a 6.06 ERA with 23 strikeouts across 16^{1}/_{3} innings pitched. However, Stanek pitched much better in the postseason, compiling a 3.38 ERA. He became a free agent after the season.

On January 30, 2025, Stanek re-signed with the Mets on a one-year, $4.5 million contract. He made 65 total appearances for New York during the regular season, compiling a 4–6 record and 5.30 ERA with 58 strikeouts and three saves over 56 innings of work.

=== St. Louis Cardinals ===
On January 13, 2026, Stanek signed a one-year, $3.5 million contract with the St. Louis Cardinals. He earned a save on Opening Day, then a blown save and win in the third game of the season. He did not pitch in a save situation the rest of April. On November 1, the Cardinals declined their club option on Stanek making him a free agent.

== Scouting report ==
Stanek throws a four-seam fastball which stays in the high 90s and low hundreds, as well as a slider and splitter which are in the high 80s and low 90s. In the 2024 season, he added a mid-90s sinker. In 2025, he began throwing a sweeper.

== Personal life ==
Stanek is named after Baseball Hall of Famer Ryne Sandberg, who himself was named after pitcher Rinold "Ryne" Duren. Stanek is married to Survivor: David vs Goliath contestant Jessica Peet. They have two children.

== See also ==
- List of University of Arkansas people
