= Yimi García =

Dominican baseball player (born 1990)

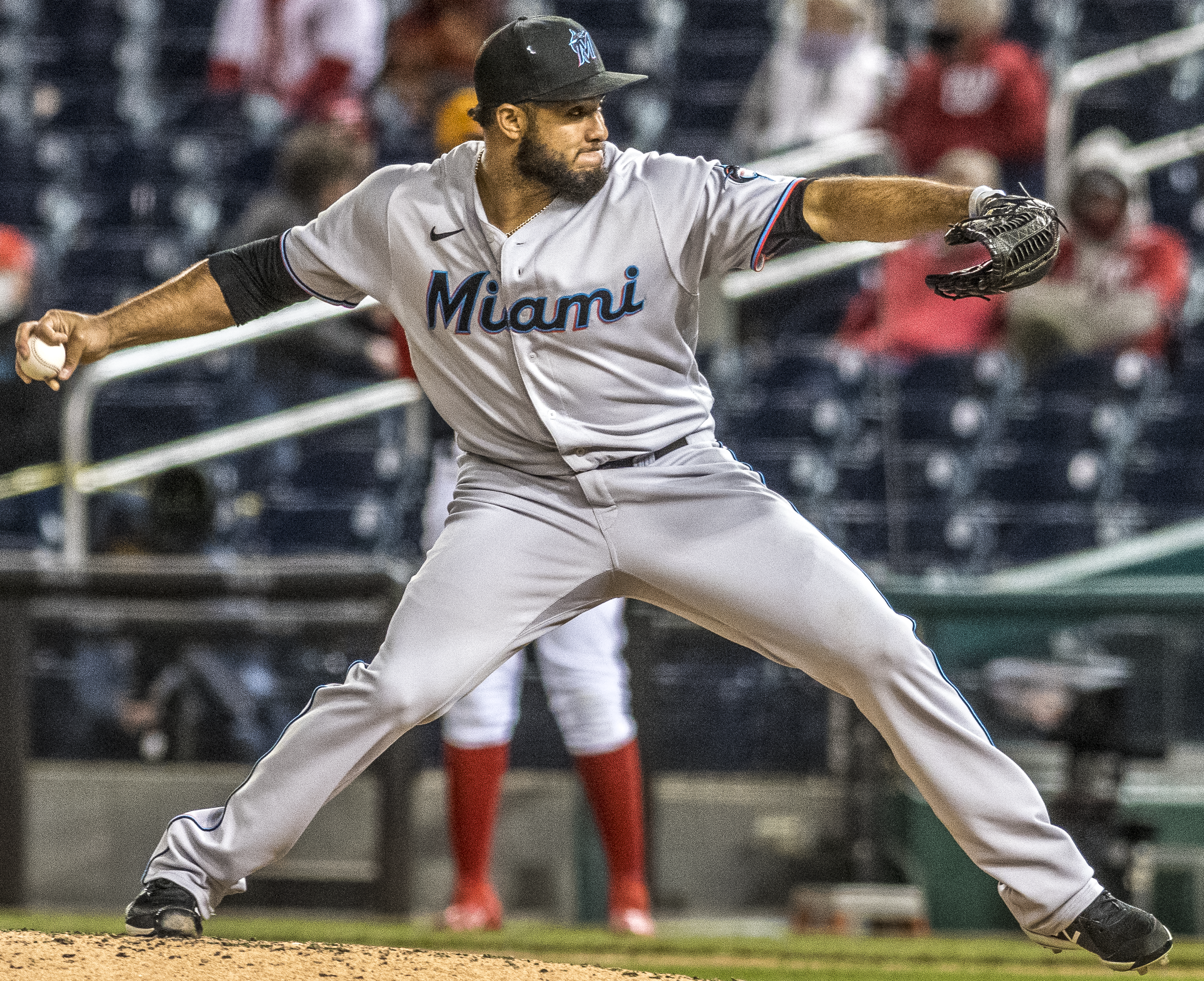
- García with the Miami Marlins

Free agent
- Pitcher
- Born: August 18, 1990 (age 36); Moca, Espaillat, Dominican Republic
- Bats: Right Throws: Right

MLB debut
- September 1, 2014, for the Los Angeles Dodgers

MLB statistics (through 2025 season)
- Win–loss record: 23–31
- Earned run average: 3.61
- Strikeouts: 456
- Saves: 29
- Stats at Baseball Reference

Teams
- Los Angeles Dodgers (2014–2016, 2018–2019); Miami Marlins (2020–2021); Houston Astros (2021); Toronto Blue Jays (2022–2024); Seattle Mariners (2024); Toronto Blue Jays (2025)

Career highlights and awards
- Pitched a combined no-hitter on May 4, 2018

Yimi García (Spanish: [ˈɟʝimi]; born August 18, 1990) is a Dominican professional baseball pitcher who is a free agent. He has played in Major League Baseball (MLB) for the Los Angeles Dodgers, Miami Marlins, Houston Astros, Seattle Mariners, and Toronto Blue Jays. He signed with the Dodgers as an amateur free agent in 2009 and made his MLB debut in 2014.

== Professional career ==
=== Los Angeles Dodgers ===
García signed with the Los Angeles Dodgers as an amateur free agent in 2009 and spent one season with the Dominican Summer League Dodgers before joining the domestic leagues with the Arizona League Dodgers in 2010 and Ogden Raptors in 2011. In 2012, he had a 3.02 earned run average (ERA) in 40 games with the Great Lakes Loons, with 14 saves. In a late season promotion to the Rancho Cucamonga Quakes, he had a 2.53 ERA in nine games. In 2013, he had a 4–6 win–loss record with a 2.54 ERA and 19 saves in 49 games with the Double-A Chattanooga Lookouts. The Dodgers added García to their 40-man roster on November 20, 2013.

García was promoted to the Triple-A Albuquerque Isotopes to begin 2014. In 47 games for the Isotopes, he was 4–2 with a 3.10 ERA. He was called up to the Dodgers on September 1, 2014, making his debut that night, in the eighth inning, against the Washington Nationals. He gave up a hit to the first batter he faced, Bryce Harper, then worked 2 scoreless innings, getting his first MLB strikeout on his last batter, Anthony Rendon. He pitched in eight games for the Dodgers, allowing two earned runs in 10 innings, striking out nine batters while walking only one. Both runs he allowed were on solo home runs on September 27 to Brandon Barnes and Michael McKenry of the Colorado Rockies.

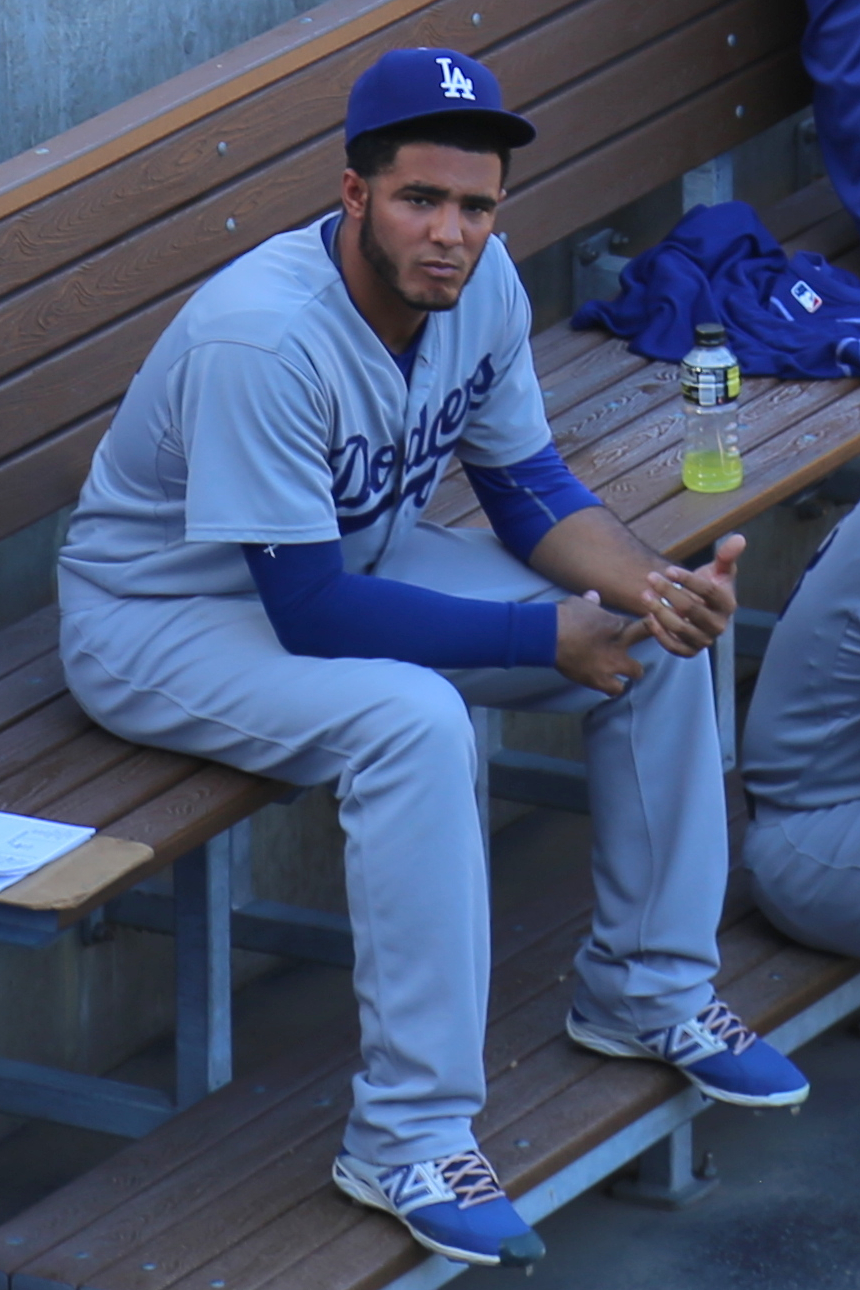
García with the Los Angeles Dodgers in 2015

In 2015, García appeared in 59 games for the Dodgers, making one start, and was 3–5 with a 3.34 ERA. He appeared in just nine games in 2016, pitching 8 1/3 innings with a 3.24 ERA. He was shut down on April 22 with right biceps soreness and experienced a setback on his rehab assignment on July 29, ending his season. He underwent arthroscopic surgery on his left knee in September and then on October 25 he underwent Tommy John surgery. Despite missing the entire 2017 season, the Dodgers signed him to a $630,000 one-year contract for 2018, to avoid salary arbitration.

Garcia returned to the majors on May 3, 2018. The following day, against the San Diego Padres at Estadio de Béisbol Monterrey, he pitched a scoreless eighth inning and was one of four pitchers involved in a combined no-hitter. He pitched in 25 games in 2018, with a 5.64 ERA. The following year, he improved his numbers and, as a result, saw his usage rise. He appeared in 64 games for the Dodgers in 2019, with a 3.61 ERA and 66 strikeouts.

On December 2, 2019, García was non-tendered and became a free agent.

=== Miami Marlins ===
On December 20, 2019, García signed a one-year, $1.1 million contract with the Miami Marlins. He pitched 15 innings in 14 appearances for the Marlins in 2020, striking out 19, for an ERA of 0.60. He and the Marlins agreed to a $1.9 million contract on January 15, 2021. García became the Marlins closer in 2021 and posted a 3.47 ERA with 15 saves, striking out 35 in 36 1/3 innings with Miami.

=== Houston Astros ===
On July 28, 2021, Garcia was traded to the Houston Astros for minor league outfielder Bryan De La Cruz and pitcher Austin Pruitt. With Houston, García was 1–2 with a 5.48 ERA. In 23 relief appearances, he pitched 21 1/3 innings, striking out 25 batters. On November 3, García elected free agency.

=== Toronto Blue Jays ===
On December 1, 2021, García signed a two-year, $11 million contract with the Toronto Blue Jays. In 61 relief outings for Toronto in 2022, he compiled a 4–5 record and 3.10 ERA with 58 strikeouts across 61 innings pitched.

García made 73 relief appearances for the Blue Jays in 2023, with a 3–4 record and 4.09 ERA with 79 strikeouts over 66 innings. He reached 100 appearances with Toronto on July 30, vesting a guaranteed $6 million contract for him in 2024. With Toronto to start 2024, he had a 2.70 ERA with 42 strikeouts and 5 saves in 29 appearances.

=== Seattle Mariners ===
On July 26, 2024, García was traded to the Seattle Mariners in exchange for Jonatan Clase and Jacob Sharp. After less than a month in Seattle, García was placed on the 10-day injured list with right elbow inflammation on August 20. He was moved to the 60-day injured list on September 10, ruling out a return in 2024. In 10 games with the Mariners, García allowed six earned runs and struck out seven in 9 innings.

=== Toronto Blue Jays (second stint) ===
On December 13, 2024, García signed a two-year, $15 million contract to return to the Toronto Blue Jays. In 22 appearances for the Blue Jays in 2025, he compiled a 1-2 record and 3.86 ERA with 25 strikeouts and two saves across 21 innings of work. On August 29, 2025, it was announced García would require season-ending surgery to clean up scar tissue in his throwing elbow.

On April 25, 2026, García was placed on the 60-day injured list as he continued to recover from surgery. On August 8, García was diagnosed with thoracic outlet syndrome. On August 25, García was ruled out for the remainder of the season after undergoing thoracic outlet surgery.

== See also ==
- List of Los Angeles Dodgers no-hitters
- List of Major League Baseball no-hitters
- List of Major League Baseball players from the Dominican Republic

Awards and achievements
Preceded by Sean Manaea	No-hit game May 4, 2018 (with Buehler, Cingrani & Liberatore)	Succeeded by James Paxton
