= George Kirby (baseball) =

American baseball player (born 1998)

Seattle Mariners – No. 68
- Pitcher
- Born: February 4, 1998 (age 28); Rye, New York, U.S.
- Bats: Right Throws: Right

MLB debut
- May 8, 2022, for the Seattle Mariners

MLB statistics (through 2026 season)
- Win–loss record: 54–45
- Earned run average: 3.74
- Strikeouts: 769
- Stats at Baseball Reference

Teams
- Seattle Mariners (2022–present)

Career highlights and awards
- All-Star (2023); MLB Records: 24 consecutive strikes to start a game

George Joseph Kirby (born February 4, 1998) is an American professional baseball pitcher for the Seattle Mariners of Major League Baseball (MLB). He made his MLB debut in 2022. The Mariners selected Kirby in the first round of the 2019 MLB draft out of Elon University. He was an All-Star in 2023.

Known for his command, Kirby has the highest strikeout-to-walk ratio and second-lowest walk rate among qualified starting pitchers since 1950. He holds the record for the highest strikeout-to-walk ratio through a pitcher's first 50 MLB starts.

== Amateur career ==
Kirby grew up in Rye, New York, a fan of the New York Yankees. He attended Rye High School in Rye, where he played baseball and basketball. As a sophomore baseball player in 2014, he threw 153 pitches in the NYSPHSAA Section 1 Class A championship game to beat Lakeland High School. Elon University began recruiting him that year to play college baseball. After his junior season in 2015, he was named to the New York State Sportswriters Association's All-State first team for Class A as a pitcher and first baseman and The Journal News Westchester/Putnam All-Star First Team, alongside Josiah Gray. As a senior in 2016, he went 6–0 with a 0.32 ERA and 73 strikeouts in 43 1/3 innings and was again named to the All-State first team. He did not lose a game his final three years of high school. Although expected to be an early pick in the 2016 Major League Baseball draft, he fell to the New York Mets in the 32nd round because of signability concerns. He did not sign with the Mets and instead chose to attend Elon, playing baseball for the Elon Phoenix.

As a freshman at Elon in 2017, Kirby appeared in 16 games (five starts) and had a 1–3 record with a 4.84 ERA, striking out 55 batters in 61 1/3 innings. He was named to the Colonial Athletic Association (CAA) All-Rookie team. As a sophomore in 2018, Kirby started 15 games, going 10–3 with a 2.89 ERA and 96 strikeouts in 90 1/3 innings. He earned a spot on the All-CAA second team. That summer, Kirby played in the Cape Cod Baseball League for the Harwich Mariners, where he posted a 1.38 ERA in 13 innings. Prior to the 2019 season, Kirby was named a preseason All-American by Baseball America and Perfect Game. He was named the 2019 CAA Pitcher of the Year after going 8–2 with a 2.75 ERA in 14 starts, striking out 107 batters and walking only six in 88 1/3 innings.

== Professional career ==
=== Seattle Mariners ===
==== 2019–2022: Signing and minor league advancement ====
Kirby was drafted by the Seattle Mariners with the 20th overall pick in 2019 Major League Baseball draft. He signed with Seattle for $3.24 million. He debuted professionally that summer with the Everett AquaSox of the Class A Short Season Northwest League. In nine games, eight of them starts, Kirby had a 2.35 ERA, striking out 25 over 23 innings. Kirby spent the 2020 season, shortened because of the COVID-19 pandemic, at the Mariners' alternate training site in Tacoma. He was named a Top 100 prospect by MLB.com at the end of the season.

Kirby returned to Everett, now in High-A West, to begin 2021. In August, he was promoted to the Double-A Arkansas Travelers. Over 15 starts between the two clubs, Kirby had a 5–3 record, 2.53 ERA, and 80 strikeouts in 67 2/3 innings. Entering 2022, he was ranked as a top 40 prospect by MLB.com, Baseball America, and Baseball Prospectus. He started the season back in Arkansas, going he was 2–0, with a 1.82 ERA in five starts.

==== 2022: Rookie season and postseason ====
On May 8, 2022, the Mariners selected Kirby's contract and promoted him to the major leagues. He made his MLB debut that day, starting against the Tampa Bay Rays, throwing six scoreless innings and striking out seven batters. His debut came on Mother's Day, and his mother, Linda, flew to Seattle to see him pitch.

Kirby was sent down to the Tacoma Rainiers from July 9 to 26 to limit his pitching, throwing just two innings in Triple-A. Pitching against the Washington Nationals on August 24, Kirby set an MLB record by throwing 24 consecutive strikes to start a game, the most by a major league pitcher since at least 1988, when pitch tracking began. Joe Musgrove held the record previously, throwing 21 consecutive strikes in a 2018 start. Kirby was named the American League Rookie of the Month for August. Kirby finished 6th in the AL Rookie of the Year voting in 2022. He ended his rookie season with an 8–5 record and 3.39 ERA, striking out 133 while walking 22 in 130 innings.

Kirby made his MLB postseason debut on October 8 in the Mariners 10–9 win over the Toronto Blue Jays in the second and final Wild Card Series game. He came in as a reliever to close the game. He issued a one-out walk to Matt Chapman, then retired the next two hitters to finish the game and send the Mariners to the American League Division Series (ALDS). Kirby earned his first save since pitching in the Cape Cod League in 2018. He started Game 3 of the ALDS, an elimination game against the Houston Astros, with the Mariners trailing the series two games to none. Kirby pitched well, tossing seven scoreless innings, striking out five, and allowing no walks. When he was pulled, the game was scoreless. The game remained scoreless until the 18th inning, which broke an MLB playoff record set days earlier in a game between the Cleveland Guardians and Tampa Bay Rays. The Mariners used nine pitchers after Kirby, with the Astros scoring the game's only run on Jeremy Peña's home run off Mariners reliever Penn Murfee.

==== 2023: All-Star ====
In his first 14 starts of 2023, Kirby had 75 strikeouts and six walks in 87 2/3 innings, an MLB-leading 12.5 strikeout-to-walk ratio. Kirby was named to his first All-Star Game, selected as a replacement for the injured Shane McClanahan. He pitched in front of his home fans in Seattle, getting a blown save after allowing a run in the fourth inning. He became the second Rye High School graduate to play in the All-Star Game, following B.J. Surhoff in 1999.

After a loss to Tampa Bay on September 8, Kirby criticized manager Scott Servais for leaving him in the game past the 6th inning. The next day, he apologized to Servais, saying, "Skip, that's not who I am."

On September 26, Kirby was hit by a baseball thrown onto the field by a fan sitting behind the third base dugout. The fan, wearing a Jarred Kelenic Mariners jersey, was promptly removed from T-Mobile Park.

During the final game of the regular season on October 1, Kirby tossed the first knuckleball of his MLB career, throwing the pitch to honor former Boston Red Sox knuckleballer Tim Wakefield, who died that day. Kirby said after the game, "I always loved watching that guy pitch, even though he's a Red Sox player and I'm a born Yankee fan." The single knuckleball induced a swing and miss from that year's American League MVP runner-up Corey Seager. Seattle catcher Cal Raleigh, who caught Kirby's knuckler, grew up a Red Sox fan.

Kirby was 13–10 with a 3.35 ERA across 31 starts and 190 2/3 innings in 2023. He struck out 172 batters, while walking just 19 batters. He led the majors with a 9.05 strikeout-to-walk ratio and walked only 2.5 percent of batters he faced. He finished 8th in Cy Young Award voting.

==== 2024 ====
Kirby struck out a then-career-best 12 batters on April 27, pitching seven scoreless innings in a win over the Arizona Diamondbacks. He threw a knuckleball on the first pitch of his July 31 start at Fenway Park, his first time pitching in Boston since Wakefield's 2023 death. Kirby suffered one of the worst starts of his career on August 13, allowing 11 runs, only six of them earned, while recording 11 outs in a blowout loss to the Detroit Tigers.

Kirby posted several career highs in 2024, including 14 wins, 11 losses, 179 strikeouts, and 33 starts. He gave up 181 hits, which led the American League. He recorded one more out than in 2023, pitching 191 innings. He again led the majors by recording 7.78 strikeouts per walk and walking only 3 percent of batters, both of which were slightly worse than his rates in 2023.

==== 2025: Injury and return to postseason ====
Kirby began the 2025 season on the injured list, shut down in early March with inflammation in his throwing shoulder. He debuted on May 22 against Houston, throwing for 3 2/3 innings with five earned runs and four strikeouts, taking the loss. He earned his first win of season on June 8 against the Los Angeles Angels, throwing seven innings with two hits, two earned runs, and a career-high 14 strikeouts. He also picked up his 500th career strikeout, making him the third-fastest by innings to reach that mark in Mariners franchise history; he did so in 527 2/3 innings, behind only James Paxton (492 2/3) and Logan Gilbert (503 2/3). Kirby struck out 14 Angels again on September 14. He ended the 2025 season having made 23 starts, going 10–8 with a 4.21 ERA and 137 strikeouts over 126 innings. He issued walks to 5.5 percent of batters faced, the highest rate of his career.

Kirby started Games 1 and 5 of the ALDS against the Detroit Tigers. He contained Tigers batters, except for Kerry Carpenter, who had previously homered off Kirby in four out of eight regular-season at bats. Carpenter hit a two-run home run off Kirby in Game 1. In Game 5, Kirby allowed two singles to Carpenter and was pulled after giving up only his third hit of the game. Carpenter, the first batter up after Kirby departed, hit another two-run home run, saddling Kirby with one earned run in five innings. The Mariners won Game 5 in 15 innings and advanced to the American League Championship Series. Kirby allowed 3 runs (all driven in by Carpenter) in 10 innings with 14 strikeouts and 1 walk in his two ALDS starts.

== Personal life ==
Kirby attended the final Mets game at Shea Stadium in 2008. As a child, he was a Yankees fan, with Jorge Posada, Derek Jeter, and Bernie Williams his favorite players on the team.

Growing up, Kirby also played football, soccer, and golf.
