= Dominican Summer League Mariners =

- Founded in 1989 in San Cristóbal, Dominican Republic; Based in Boca Chica

Minor league affiliations
- Class: Rookie
- League: Dominican Summer League
- Division: Southwest

Major league affiliations
- Team: Seattle Mariners

Minor league titles
- League titles (0): None
- Division titles: 2010–2012, 2016

Team data
- Owner/ Operator: Seattle Mariners
- Manager: Luis Matias

The Dominican Summer League Mariners, or DSL Mariners, are a Rookie-level affiliate of the Seattle Mariners that competes in the Dominican Summer League of Minor League Baseball. The team plays its home games in Boca Chica, Dominican Republic.

The Mariners first had a Dominican minor league affiliate in 1989. The team played in San Cristóbal for two seasons, then in Santo Domingo. The Mariners also had a Venezuelan Summer League team from 2002 to 2015. After shuttering its Venezuelan academy in early 2015, the Mariners had a second Dominican team, called DSL Mariners 2, for one season.

The Mariners opened a $7 million training academy in Boca Chica in 2014, after previously sharing a facility with the Los Angeles Dodgers. The academy also helps players earn their equivalent of a high school diploma.

== Notable players ==
- Jonatan Clase (2019)
- Ketel Marte (2011)
- Noelvi Marte (2017)
- Lázaro Montes (2022)
- Freddy Peralta (2013)
- Michael Pineda (2006, 2007)
- Julio Rodríguez (2018)

== Roster ==
Dominican Summer League Mariners roster
Players	Coaches/Other
Pitchers: 23 Henry Alcantara; 54 Cristian Alvarado; 32 German Arvayo; 21 Kleiver Benitez; 36 Gabriel Hidalgo; 29 Wisler Infante; 18 Anderson Jimenez; 35 Erick Lanza; 30 Carlos Martinez; 37 Danery Meyer; 33 Randal Munoz; 15 Ismanuel Piña; 34 Kevin Pino; 9 Osvaldo Platas; 14 Christopher Quiroz; 20 Darwin Ramos; 8 Jesus Rondon; 31 Mathias Sato; 10 Adalberto Vallenilla; 28 Adan Vallenilla; Catchers: 27 Manuel Baez; 41 Gabriel Guanchez; 12 Santiago Pereira; Infielders: 7 Magz German; 1 Fabian Gonzalez; 13 Dawel Joseph; 5 Kendry Martinez; 17 Leonardo Reynoso; Outfielders: 6 Jarvis Gomez; 19 Elias Perez; 2 Gregory Pio; 22 Ambeiro Recio; 3 Juan Rijo; 16 Maikol Rodriguez; 44 Edgardo Toro	Manager: -- Luis Matias; Coaches: -- Jose Amancio (pitching); -- Robert Emery (bench); -- Jesus Galindo (outfield/base running); -- Angus Stayte (hitting); 60-day injured list: 30 Cesar Farias; 7-day injured list; * On Seattle Mariners 40-man roster; ~ Development list; # Rehab assignment; ∞ Reserve list; ‡ Restricted list; § Suspended list; † Temporarily inactive list; Roster updated June 19, 2026; Transactions; → More rosters: MiLB • Dominican Summer League; → Seattle Mariners minor league players
