= Bryan Woo =

American baseball player (born 2000)

Seattle Mariners – No. 22
- Pitcher
- Born: January 30, 2000 (age 26); Oakland, California, U.S.
- Bats: Right Throws: Right

MLB debut
- June 3, 2023, for the Seattle Mariners

MLB statistics (through 2026 season)
- Win–loss record: 40–25
- Earned run average: 3.45
- Strikeouts: 567
- Stats at Baseball Reference

Teams
- Seattle Mariners (2023–present)

Career highlights and awards
- All-Star (2025)

Bryan Joseph Woo (born January 30, 2000) is an American professional baseball pitcher for the Seattle Mariners of Major League Baseball (MLB). He made his MLB debut in 2023. In 2025, he was named to the All-Star Game and All-MLB second team. In 2026, he was named one of the 50 greatest Mariners players. He pitched in college for the Cal Poly Mustangs, undergoing Tommy John surgery before Seattle selected him in the 2021 MLB draft.

== Amateur career ==
Growing up, Woo primarily played shortstop and third base. He had a strong arm but was not viewed as a prospect until growing eight inches during high school. He attended Alameda High School in Alameda, California, and did not pitch regularly until his junior year. As a senior in 2018, he went 8–2 with a 1.25 earned run average (ERA) while batting .422 as a switch hitter. He was named the player of the year in the West Alameda County Conference Foothill Division by the Mercury News. That summer, he played for the Peninsula Oilers in the Alaska Baseball League. The San Francisco Giants attempted to sign Woo at a scouting event in Alaska, but he chose to attend college.

Woo enrolled at Cal Poly to play college baseball for the Mustangs. He chose Cal Poly primarily due to academic reputation, noting that it was the only program that recruited him as a pitcher and not as a two-way player. As a freshman in 2019, he had a 9.13 ERA over 23 2/3 innings. He returned to play for the Oilers that summer and was named the league's top pro prospect. He pitched only 17 2/3 innings as a reliever for Cal Poly in 2020 before the season was cancelled due to the COVID-19 pandemic. In 2021, he had a 6.11 ERA over 28 innings before undergoing Tommy John surgery and missing the rest of the season. Woo started six of the 31 games he pitched in college, finishing with a 4–7 win–loss record, one save, a 6.49 ERA, and 89 strikeouts in 69 1/3 innings.

== Professional career ==
=== Minor leagues ===
The Seattle Mariners selected Woo in the sixth round with the 174th overall selection of the 2021 Major League Baseball draft. He signed with the Mariners for $318,200, which was $31,700 above the slot value of the draft pick. While recovering from elbow surgery, he also suffered an appendicitis. He made his professional debut in June 2022 with the Arizona Complex League Mariners. During a game, he was rushed to the hospital after being hit in the face by a line drive hit by James Wood but was not seriously injured. Woo was promoted to the Low-A Modesto Nuts in late June, then the High-A Everett AquaSox at the end of July. Over 16 starts for the three clubs, Woo posted a 1–4 record with a 4.11 ERA and 84 strikeouts in 57 innings. He played in the Arizona Fall League for the Peoria Javelinas after the season. Coming back from his injury, Woo prioritized throwing his fastball.

Woo started 2023 with the Double-A Arkansas Travelers. In nine starts, he had a 3–2 record and 2.05 ERA with 59 strikeouts in 44 innings pitched. He began throwing a sinker in Double-A.

=== Major leagues ===
==== 2023 ====
On June 2, the Mariners announced that Woo would be promoted to the major leagues to start the following day against the Texas Rangers. Starting in place of Marco Gonzales, Woo had had a rough debut, allowing six runs in two innings. He won his first MLB game in his fourth start, besting the New York Yankees on June 22. He finished his rookie season with a 4–5 record, 4.21 ERA, and 92 strikeouts in 87 2/3 innings. Manager Scott Servais said that Woo was still developing his breaking balls as a rookie.

==== 2024 ====
Despite several injuries, Woo improved in 2024. He began the season on the injured list with elbow inflammation. He made his first start on May 10. In his first six starts, he posted a 1.07 ERA, the lowest in Mariners history to begin a season. He was scratched from his next start on June 11 and made two more starts, earning losses in both outings, before returning to the injured list on June 25 with a hamstring injury. He was activated on July 12, resuming his turn in the Mariners rotation. He ended 2024 with a 9–3 record and 2.89 ERA, striking out 101 batters in 121 1/3 innings over 21 starts, all improvements from his rookie season. He was the best MLB starting pitcher at avoiding base on balls, walking 2.6 percent of batters faced.

==== 2025: All-Star ====
Woo was one of the most consistent pitchers in 2025. He was named to the All-Star Game in July. On July 10, he brought a no-hitter into the 8th inning against the Yankees. Before the All-Star break, he ranked third in the American League (AL) in strikeout-to-walk ratio and walk rate and accumulated more strikeouts than in either of his two previous seasons. Woo pitched at least 6 innings in his first 25 starts, a franchise record. During that stretch, he also allowed no more than two walks, the longest stretch to start a season since Cy Young in 1905. That consistent length benefitted the Mariners' bullpen. Woo struck out a career-high 13 batters on September 13 in a win over the Los Angeles Angels. However, he was removed early from his next start due to a pectoral injury, earning a win over the Houston Astros but ending his regular season. He was 15–7 with a 2.98 ERA and 198 strikeouts in 186 2/3 innings. He finished fifth in AL Cy Young Award voting and was named to the All-MLB second team. He ranked in the top five in the AL in wins, ERA, walks plus hits per innings pitched, strikeouts, strikeout-to-walk ratio, and double plays turned. His fastball was one of the most valuable pitches in the majors, according to Statcast, and he had the best command, according to PitchingBot analytics. However, he allowed 26 home runs, tied for eighth most in the AL.

Woo's pectoral injury kept him off the Mariners roster for the AL Division Series, but he pitched in relief twice in the AL Championship Series. In the decisive Game 7, he allowed two runners on and was relieved by Eduard Bazardo, who promptly allowed a series-winning three-run home run, with two runs charged to Woo. Woo allowed three runs, four hits, and three walks while striking out two in 4 1/3 innings in his first postseason.

==== 2026 ====
Woo declined an invitation to pitch for the United States national team in the 2026 World Baseball Classic, citing his increased workload in 2025. He began the 2026 regular season third in Seattle's rotation, taking a no-decision while throwing a quality start in his first outing. After earning his first win of the season on April 19 and lowering his ERA to 2.25, Woo had consecutive poor outings, allowing a combined 13 runs in 9 innings in losses to the St. Louis Cardinals and Kansas City Royals. Throughout most of the season, he experienced a sizable difference between home and road performance splits. On June 30, he set a franchise record with a 32-inning scoreless streak at home. At the end of July, he had a 2.20 ERA at home compared to a 6.71 ERA in away games.

Against the Athletics on September 6, Woo pitched a career-high eight innings, allowing one hit. He finished the season with a 12–10 record, setting a career high in losses, with a 4.01 ERA in 173 innings pitched. His 175 strikeouts were 10th in the AL, and he ranked third in walks per nine innings pitched.

== Player profile ==
Woo primarily throws a four-seam fastball and sinker that both average 95 miles per hour (153 km/h). His offspeed pitches are a changeup and slider (some of which are labeled a sweeper). He throws his fastball and sinker close to 75 percent of the time, more frequently than most of his contemporary starters. He also throws a high percentage of strikes, which limits his base on balls. Woo throws from a low arm slot and has a low release point and smooth delivery, which can make it difficult for batters to hit his pitches hard.

In 2026, Woo was named one of the 50 greatest players in Mariners history.

== Personal life ==
Woo was born in Oakland, California, to a White American mother and a Chinese American father. He grew up in Alameda with his parents and sister. His parents attend many of his MLB starts. His paternal grandparents were born in China and moved to California. He visited China twice as a child. His maternal grandfather died in July 2025, the same day as Woo's final start before he pitched in the All-Star Game.

As a child, Woo was a fan of the San Francisco Giants. His favorite player was Brandon Crawford. In 2024, Woo became the last person born in Oakland to play an MLB game in Oakland. In 2026, he attended Super Bowl LX in nearby Santa Clara with several Mariners teammates.

During a 2024 start, Woo wore custom cleats with illustrations of professional wrestler Ric Flair, who was known for yelling "woo". In 2026, Woo played catch with a young fan in the Mariners bullpen before a game.
