= 2025 American League Division Series =

Teams
Team (Wins)		Manager	Season
Toronto Blue Jays (3)		John Schneider	94–68 (.580), GA: 0
New York Yankees (1)		Aaron Boone	94–68 (.580), GB: 0
- Dates: October 4–8
- Television: Canada: Sportsnet; TVA Sports (French); United States: Fox (Game 1); FS1 (Games 2–4); Fox Deportes (Spanish)
- TV announcers: Dan Shulman, Buck Martinez, and Hazel Mae (Sportsnet); Joe Davis, John Smoltz, and Ken Rosenthal (Fox/FS1)
- Radio: ESPN
- Radio announcers: Karl Ravech, Eduardo Pérez, and Tim Kurkjian
- Umpires: Jordan Baker, Dan Bellino (crew chief), Adam Hamari, Roberto Ortiz, Tony Randazzo, Chris Segal

Teams
Team (Wins)		Manager	Season
Seattle Mariners (3)		Dan Wilson	90–72 (.556), GA: 3
Detroit Tigers (2)		A. J. Hinch	87–75 (.537), GB: 3
- Dates: October 4–10
- Television: FS1 (Games 1–2 and 4); FS2/MLBN (Game 3); Fox (Game 5)
- TV announcers: Adam Amin, A. J. Pierzynski, Adam Wainwright, and Tom Verducci
- Radio: ESPN
- Radio announcers: Roxy Bernstein and Gregg Olson
- Umpires: Chris Guccione, Alan Porter (crew chief), Jeremie Rehak, Nate Tomlinson, Alex Tosi, John Tumpane
- ALWC: Detroit Tigers over Cleveland Guardians (2–1); New York Yankees over Boston Red Sox (2–1)

The 2025 American League Division Series (ALDS) were the two best-of-five playoff series in Major League Baseball’s (MLB) 2025 postseason to determine the participating teams of the 2025 American League Championship Series (ALCS). These matchups were:

- (1) Toronto Blue Jays (AL East champions) vs. (4) New York Yankees (Wild Card Series winner): Blue Jays won the series, 3–1.
- (2) Seattle Mariners (AL West champions) vs. (6) Detroit Tigers (Wild Card Series winner): Mariners won the series, 3–2.

The team with the better regular season record (higher seed) of each series hosted Games 1, 2, and (if necessary) 5, while the lower seeded team hosted Game 3 and (if necessary) 4.

The Blue Jays would go on to defeat the Mariners in seven games in the ALCS before falling in the World Series against the Los Angeles Dodgers in seven games.

== Background ==
The top two division winners (first two seeds) were determined by regular season winning percentages. The final two teams were the winners of the American League (AL) Wild Card Series, played between the league's third to sixth-seeded teams.

The Toronto Blue Jays (94–68) clinched their fourth playoff berth since 2020 on September 21 and won their first AL East title since 2015, a first-round bye, and home-field advantage throughout the AL playoffs on September 28 by virtue of their 8–5 head-to-head record against the New York Yankees, with a 13–4 victory against the Tampa Bay Rays in their final regular season game. They played the fourth-seeded New York Yankees (94–68), who defeated their divisional archrival Boston Red Sox in the Wild Card Series in three games. The Blue Jays and Yankees both finished the regular season with an identical 94–68 record, with the Blue Jays winning their regular season series of 8–5 over the Yankees that gave them a head-to-head tiebreaker for honors above. This was the first postseason meeting between the Blue Jays and Yankees. There was controversy surrounding the announcers of both teams this season. Michael Kay, the Yankees' lead TV play-by-play announcer, insisted the Blue Jays were "not a first-place caliber team" due to their run differential in July. Kay later stated he was misunderstood and reached out to former Yankees first baseman and current Blue Jays bench coach Don Mattingly to quell controversy. In September, Blue Jays’ color television analyst Buck Martinez made critical comments towards the Yankees, stating they were "not a good team" due to their numerous wild pitches, fielding mistakes, and poor baserunning, along with their over-reliance on home runs.

The Seattle Mariners (90–72) clinched a postseason berth for the first time since 2022 on September 23 with a victory against the Colorado Rockies. The next night, they won the AL West for the first time since 2001, ending the second-longest division title drought in the majors, and also clinched a first-round bye with a Cleveland Guardians loss to the Detroit Tigers on September 25. They played the sixth-seeded Tigers (87–75), who defeated their divisional rival Cleveland in the Wild Card Series in three games. The Mariners had a 4–2 record against the Tigers in the regular season, including a road sweep of the Tigers just before the All-Star break. This was the first postseason meeting between the Mariners and Tigers.

== Matchups ==
=== Toronto Blue Jays vs. New York Yankees ===
Toronto won the series, 3–1.

Game	Date	Score	Location	Time	Attendance
1	October 4	New York Yankees – 1, Toronto Blue Jays – 10	Rogers Centre	3:06	44,655
2	October 5	New York Yankees – 7, Toronto Blue Jays – 13	Rogers Centre	3:04	44,764
3	October 7	Toronto Blue Jays – 6, New York Yankees – 9	Yankee Stadium	3:29	47,399
4	October 8	Toronto Blue Jays – 5, New York Yankees – 2	Yankee Stadium	3:22	47,823

=== Seattle Mariners vs. Detroit Tigers ===
Seattle won the series, 3–2.

Game	Date	Score	Location	Time	Attendance
1	October 4	Detroit Tigers – 3, Seattle Mariners – 2 (11)	T-Mobile Park	3:21	47,290
2	October 5	Detroit Tigers – 2, Seattle Mariners – 3	T-Mobile Park	2:46	47,371
3	October 7	Seattle Mariners – 8, Detroit Tigers – 4	Comerica Park	2:57 (2:53 delay)	41,525
4	October 8	Seattle Mariners – 3, Detroit Tigers – 9	Comerica Park	2:55	37,069
5	October 10	Detroit Tigers – 2, Seattle Mariners – 3 (15)	T-Mobile Park	4:58	47,025

== Toronto vs. New York ==
This was the first postseason match-up between the Toronto Blue Jays and New York Yankees.

=== Game 1 ===
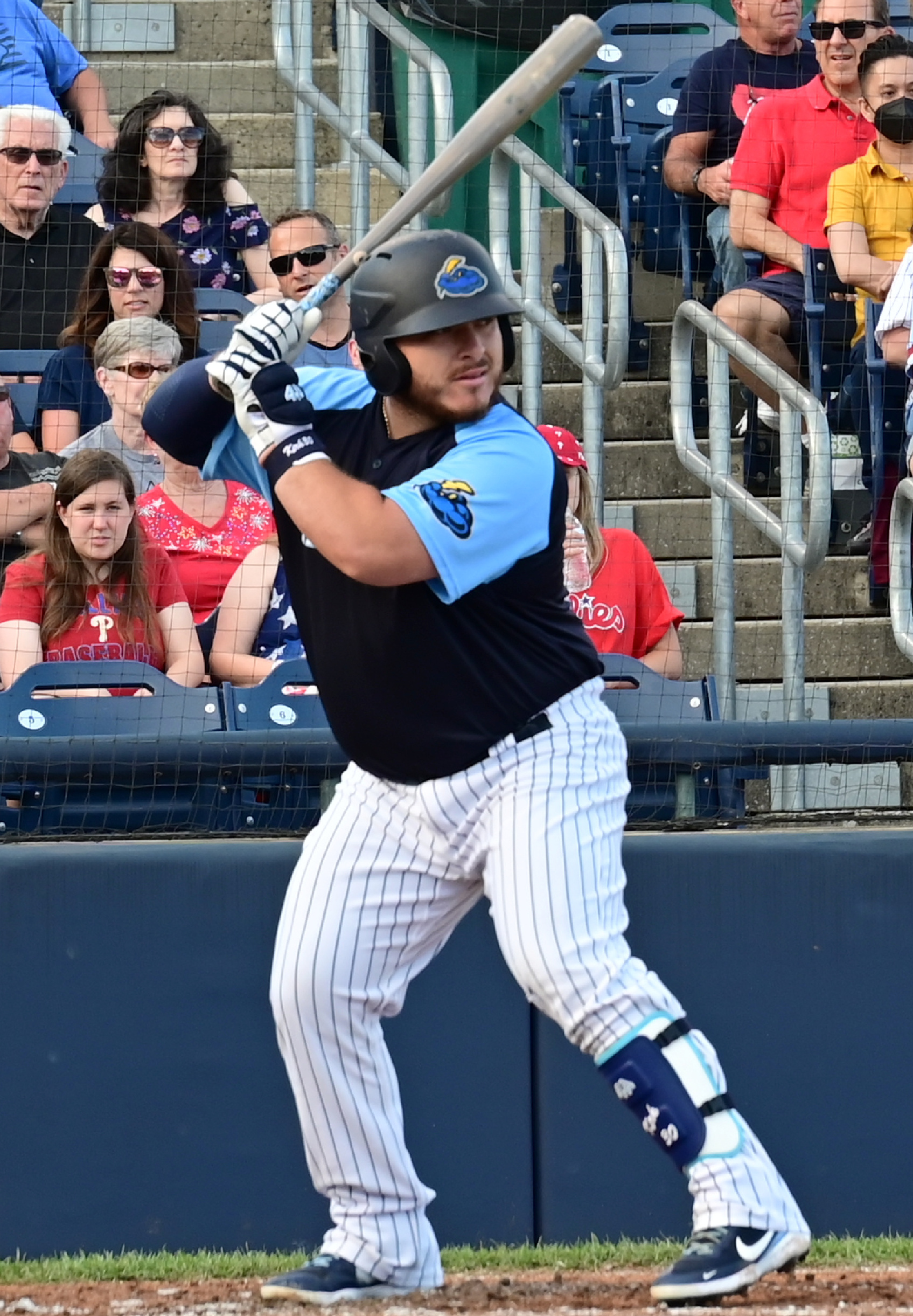
Alejandro Kirk hit two home runs in Game 1.

October 4, 2025 4:08 pm (EDT) at Rogers Centre in Toronto, Ontario 77 °F (25 °C), Sunny
Team	1	2	3	4	5	6	7	8	9	R	H	E
New York	0	0	0	0	0	1	0	0	0	1	6	0
Toronto	1	1	0	0	0	0	4	4	X	10	14	0
WP: Kevin Gausman (1–0) LP: Luis Gil (0–1); Home runs: NYY: None; TOR: Vladimir Guerrero Jr. (1), Alejandro Kirk 2 (2); Attendance: 44,655; Boxscore

In the bottom of the first inning, Vladimir Guerrero Jr. hit a solo home run off Luis Gil to give the Blue Jays a 1–0 lead. In the bottom of the second inning, Alejandro Kirk hit another home run to extend the Blue Jays' lead to 2–0. Yankees starter Gil pitched 2 2/3 innings, allowing four hits and two runs while striking out two batters. In the top of the sixth inning, Anthony Volpe scored to get the Yankees on the board after Blue Jays starter Kevin Gausman walked Cody Bellinger. Gausman allowed four hits and one run in 5 2/3 innings while striking out three batters. Then, Louis Varland escaped a bases-loaded jam to preserve a one-run lead for the Blue Jays. In the bottom of the seventh inning, the Blue Jays extended their lead to 3–1 when Andrés Giménez hit a RBI single to right field, scoring Daulton Varsho. In the bottom of the seventh inning, Nathan Lukes scored Giménez and Ernie Clement on a RBI double, and Guerrero Jr. scored George Springer on a sacrifice fly, extending the Blue Jays' lead to 6–1. In the bottom of the eighth inning, Kirk hit his second home run of the game to extend the Blue Jays' lead to 7–1. The Blue Jays scored three more runs after an RBI double from Giménez, Clement scored Myles Straw on a sacrifice fly, and a RBI single from Lukes to extend their lead 10–1. The Blue Jays got the final out of the game when reliever Jeff Hoffman struck out Volpe to give the Blue Jays the first game of the series.

It was the first postseason win for the Blue Jays since Game 4 of the 2016 ALCS against Cleveland.

=== Game 2 ===
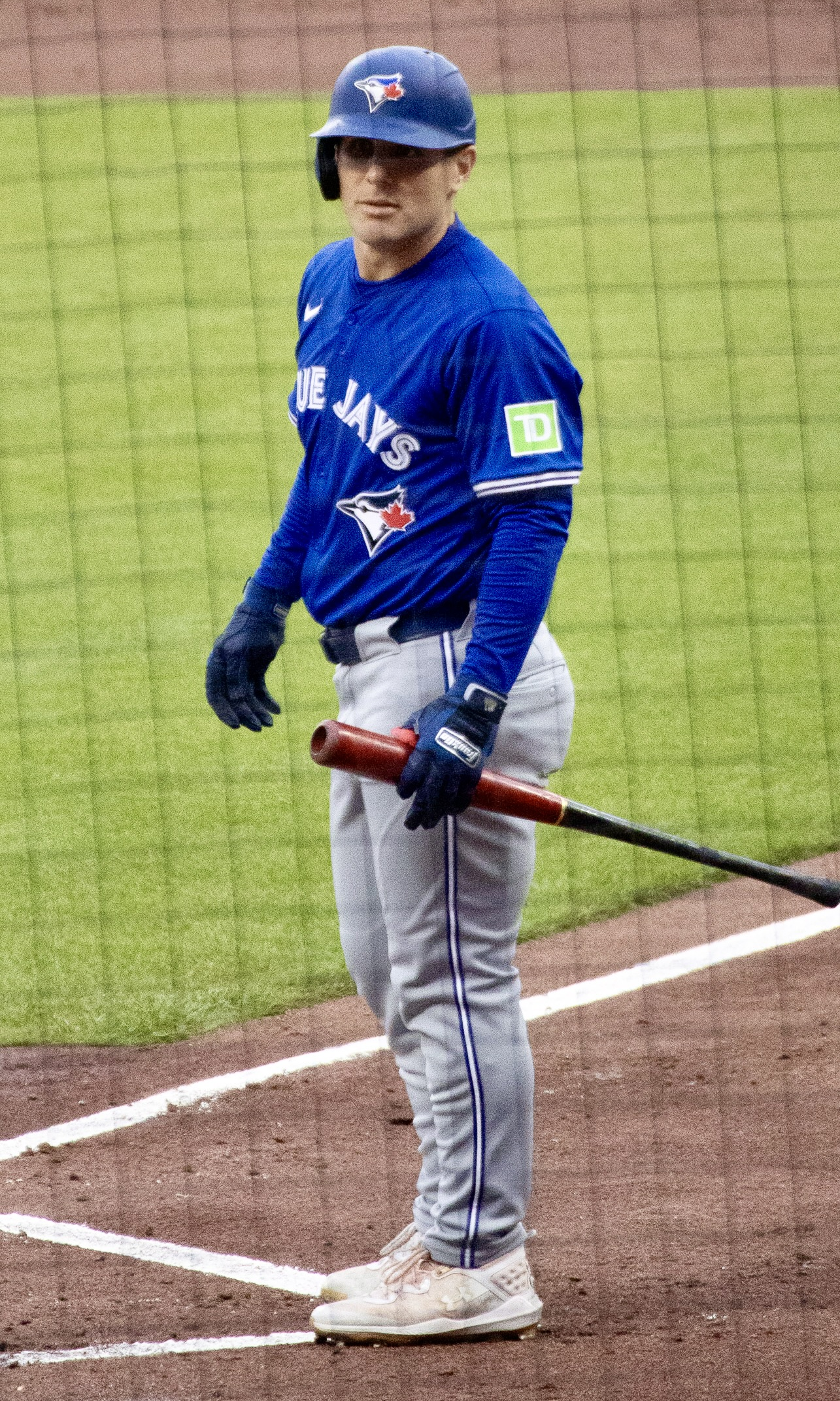
Daulton Varsho hit two home runs in Game 2.

October 5, 2025 4:08 pm (EDT) at Rogers Centre in Toronto, Ontario 74 °F (23 °C), Sunny
Team	1	2	3	4	5	6	7	8	9	R	H	E
New York	0	0	0	0	0	2	5	0	0	7	10	1
Toronto	0	2	3	6	1	1	0	0	X	13	15	1
WP: Trey Yesavage (1–0) LP: Max Fried (0–1); Home runs: NYY: Cody Bellinger (1); TOR: Ernie Clement (1), Vladimir Guerrero Jr. (2), George Springer (1), Daulton Varsho 2 (2); Attendance: 44,764; Boxscore

In the bottom of the second inning, Ernie Clement hit a two-run home run off Yankees starter Max Fried to give the Blue Jays a 2–0 lead. In the bottom of the third inning, Davis Schneider, Vladimir Guerrero Jr., and Daulton Varsho scored on an RBI groundout, double, and single respectively to extend the Blue Jays' lead to 5–0. Fried pitched three innings, allowed eight hits and five runs while walking two batters and striking out only one batter. In the bottom of the fourth inning, Guerrero Jr. hit a grand slam off Yankees reliever Will Warren to extend the Blue Jays' lead to 9–0, which was the first grand slam home run in Blue Jays postseason history. A two-run home run from Varsho further extended the lead to 11–0. In the bottom of the fifth inning, George Springer hit a solo home run to extend the Blue Jays' lead to 12–0. The Yankees got on the board after Cody Bellinger hit a two-run home run in the top of the sixth inning. Blue Jays rookie starter Trey Yesavage pitched 5 1/3 innings, walking one batter and striking out eleven batters, not giving up any hits in the process. In the bottom of the sixth, Varsho hit his second home run of the game to extend the Blue Jays' lead to 13–2. In the top of the seventh inning, Aaron Judge scored Ryan McMahon on a RBI single, and Bellinger hit a sacrifice fly to cut the Blue Jays' lead to 13–4. Consecutive RBI hits from Ben Rice and Giancarlo Stanton further reduced the lead to 13–7. The Blue Jays got the final out of the game when reliever Seranthony Domínguez struck Stanton out via a blocked sweeper and took a 2–0 lead over their divisional rivals, leaving the Blue Jays one win away from reaching the ALCS for the first time since 2016, and creating a win-or-go-home situation for the Yankees in Game 3 as the series shift to the Bronx.

=== Game 3 ===
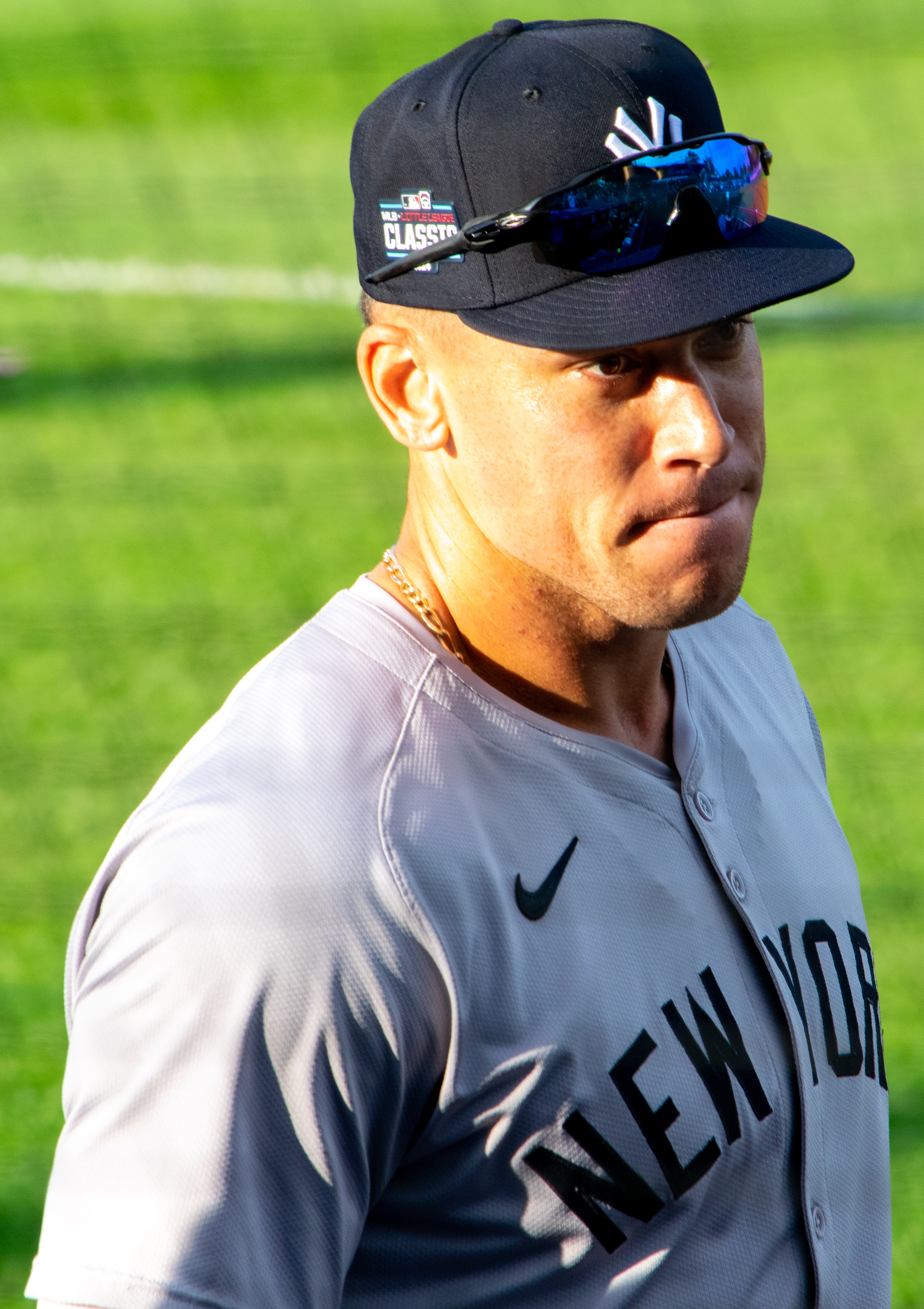
Aaron Judge hit a three-run home run in Game 3.

October 7, 2025 8:08 pm (EDT) at Yankee Stadium in The Bronx, New York 70 °F (21 °C), Cloudy
Team	1	2	3	4	5	6	7	8	9	R	H	E
Toronto	2	0	4	0	0	0	0	0	0	6	9	2
New York	1	0	2	3	2	1	0	0	X	9	12	0
WP: Tim Hill (1–0) LP: Louis Varland (0–1) Sv: David Bednar (1); Home runs: TOR: Vladimir Guerrero Jr. (3); NYY: Aaron Judge (1), Jazz Chisholm Jr. (1); Attendance: 47,399; Boxscore

In the top of the first inning, Vladimir Guerrero Jr. hit a two-run home run off Yankees starter Carlos Rodón to give the Blue Jays an early 2–0 lead. In the bottom of the first, Giancarlo Stanton hit an RBI single to left field, scoring Aaron Judge to cut the Blue Jays' lead to 2–1. In the top of the third inning, successive RBI hits from Daulton Varsho, Ernie Clement, and Anthony Santander extended the lead to 6–1. Yankees starting pitcher Rodon was removed from the game after conceding six runs in 2 1/3 innings. In the bottom of the third inning, Trent Grisham scored on a line drive from Judge to cut the Blue Jays' lead to 6–2. Giancarlo Stanton then scored Cody Bellinger on a sacrifice fly to cut the lead further to 6–3, with Blue Jays manager John Schneider removing their starter Shane Bieber after 2 2/3 innings. In the bottom of the fourth inning, Judge hit a three-run home run off Louis Varland to tie the game at 6–6. In the bottom of the fifth inning, Jazz Chisholm Jr. hit a solo home run off Varland to put the Yankees ahead, 7–6. Austin Wells then hit an RBI single, scoring Amed Rosario to extend the Yankees' lead to 8–6. In the bottom of the sixth inning, Judge scored on another sacrifice fly from Ben Rice, further extending the lead to 9–6. David Bednar pitched 1 2/3 innings to earn the save as the Yankees avoided elimination and forced a Game 4.

=== Game 4 ===
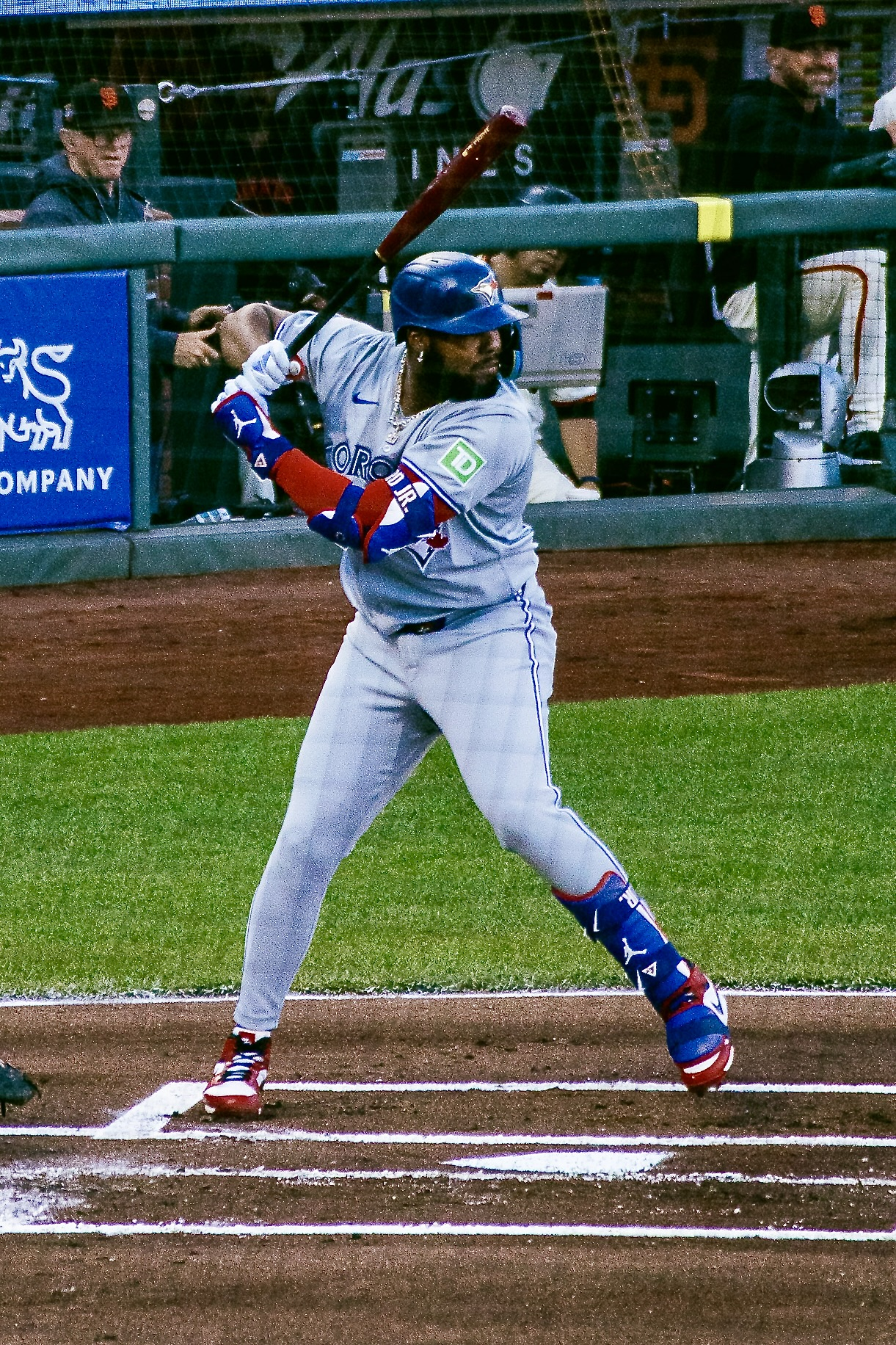
Vladimir Guerrero Jr. drove in his ninth RBI of the series in Game 4.

October 8, 2025 7:08 pm (EDT) at Yankee Stadium in The Bronx, New York 66 °F (19 °C), Clear
Team	1	2	3	4	5	6	7	8	9	R	H	E
Toronto	1	0	0	0	1	0	2	1	0	5	12	0
New York	0	0	1	0	0	0	0	0	1	2	6	1
WP: Seranthony Domínguez (1–0) LP: Cam Schlittler (0–1) Sv: Jeff Hoffman (1); Home runs: TOR: None; NYY: Ryan McMahon (1); Attendance: 47,823; Boxscore

In the top of the first inning, Vladimir Guerrero Jr. scored George Springer on an RBI single, giving the Blue Jays a 1–0 lead. Blue Jays starter Louis Varland pitched 1 1/3 innings, allowing one hit while striking out two batters. Ryan McMahon tied the game in the bottom of the third inning with a home run off of Mason Fluharty. The Blue Jays would retake the lead in the top of the fifth inning on a sacrifice fly from Springer. In the top of the seventh, Nathan Lukes tacked on some insurance runs with a two-run RBI single to extend the lead to 4–1, following an error by Jazz Chisholm Jr. that prevented them from getting out of the inning. Yankees starter Cam Schlittler would leave after the error, having pitched 6 1/3 innings and allowing eight hits and four runs (two earned) while striking out only two batters. The Blue Jays added one more in the eighth inning on a Myles Straw RBI single to further extend their lead to 5–1. The Yankees threatened in the bottom half of the inning, but reliever Jeff Hoffman got Austin Wells to pop out to escape a bases-loaded jam and preserve the lead. The Yankees cut into the lead in the ninth when Aaron Judge scored Jasson Domínguez to trim the Blue Jays' lead to 5–2, but Hoffman closed out the series by striking out Cody Bellinger to send the Blue Jays to the ALCS for the first time since 2016.

The Yankees' series loss resulted in the 16th consecutive season without a World Series title, the third-longest drought in franchise history. In addition, Aaron Boone tied Mike Hargrove for most playoff games managed for one team without winning the World Series.

During the postgame interview with Fox, Vlad Guerrero Jr., encouraged by Fox analyst and Red Sox legend David Ortiz, chanted the "Daaaa Yankees lose!", a playful imitation of the signature call, "THEEEEEE Yankees win!", used by the Yankees' long-time radio broadcaster, John Sterling, after a Yankees win.

=== Composite line score ===
2025 ALDS (3–1): Toronto Blue Jays beat New York Yankees

Team	1	2	3	4	5	6	7	8	9	R	H	E
New York Yankees	1	0	3	3	2	4	5	0	1	19	34	2
Toronto Blue Jays	4	3	7	6	2	1	6	5	0	34	50	3
Total attendance: 184,641 Average attendance: 46,160

== Seattle vs. Detroit ==
This was the first postseason match-up between the Seattle Mariners and Detroit Tigers.

=== Game 1 ===
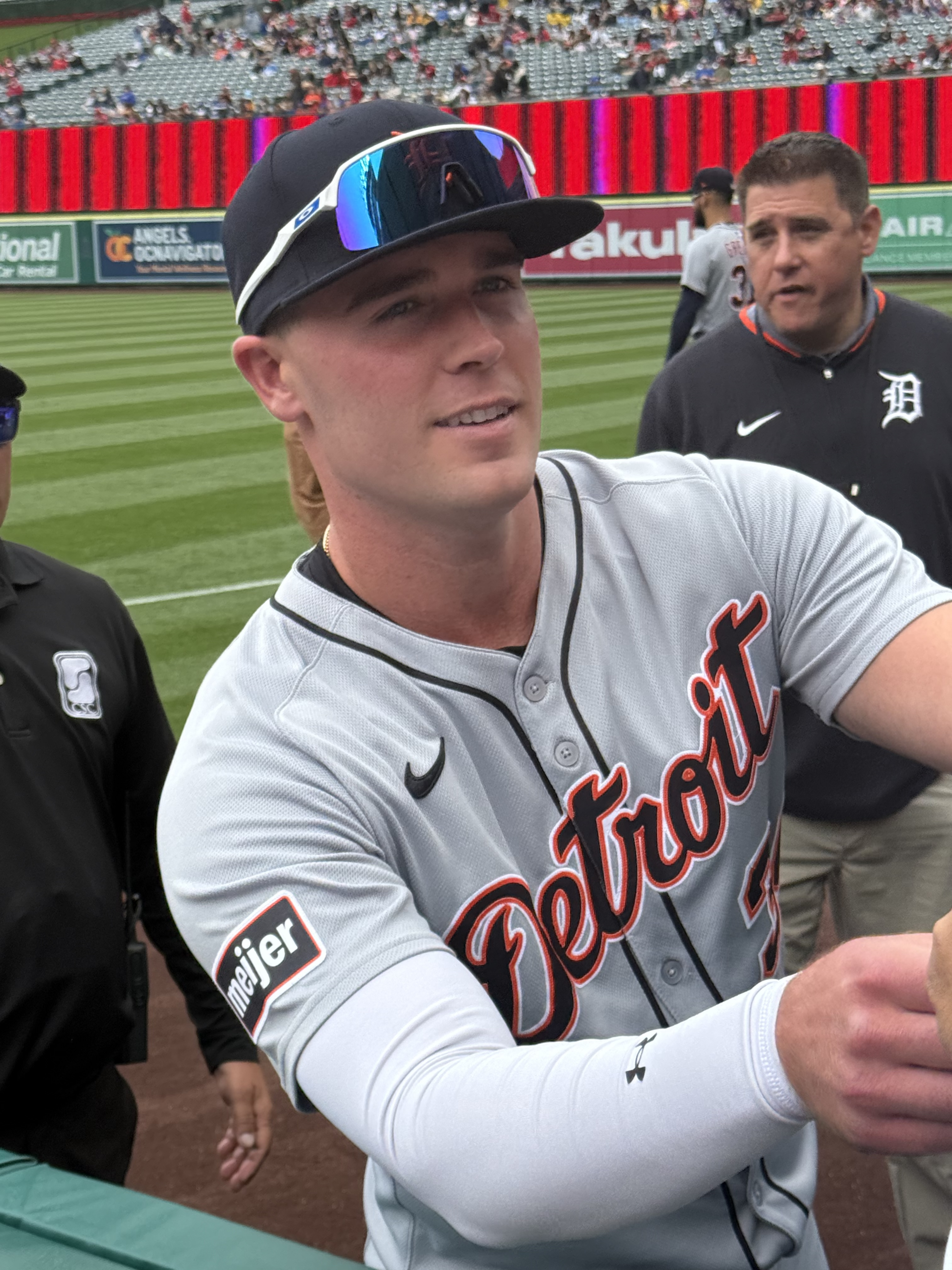
Kerry Carpenter hit a two-run homer in Game 1.

October 4, 2025 5:38 pm (PDT) at T-Mobile Park in Seattle, Washington 62 °F (17 °C), Cloudy
Team	1	2	3	4	5	6	7	8	9	10	11	R	H	E
Detroit	0	0	0	0	2	0	0	0	0	0	1	3	7	0
Seattle	0	0	0	1	0	1	0	0	0	0	0	2	6	0
WP: Will Vest (1–0) LP: Carlos Vargas (0–1) Sv: Keider Montero (1); Home runs: DET: Kerry Carpenter (1); SEA: Julio Rodríguez (1); Attendance: 47,290; Boxscore

In the fourth inning, Julio Rodríguez hit a leadoff solo home run off Tigers starter Troy Melton to give the Mariners a 1–0 lead. Melton pitched four innings, allowed two hits and one run while striking out four batters. In the top of the fifth inning, Kerry Carpenter hit a two-run home run off Mariners starter George Kirby to take a 2–1 lead for the Tigers. Kirby pitched five innings, allowed six hits and two runs while striking out eight batters. In the bottom of the sixth inning, Rodríguez scored Randy Arozarena via a RBI single to tie the game at 2–2. The game remained at 2–2 into extra innings until Zach McKinstry hit a RBI single, scoring Spencer Torkelson in the eleventh inning. The Tigers closed out the game with Keider Montero inducing a Josh Naylor groundout to Torkelson, giving the Tigers the early lead in the series.

=== Game 2 ===
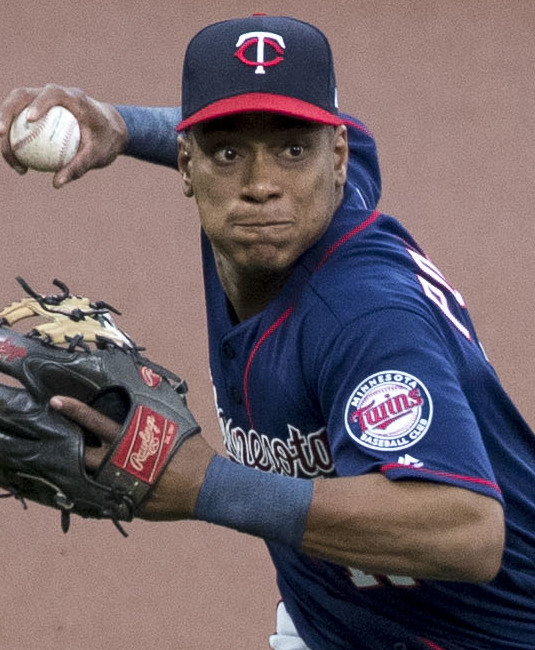
Jorge Polanco, pictured here with the Minnesota Twins, hit two home runs in Game 2.

October 5, 2025 5:03 pm (PDT) at T-Mobile Park in Seattle, Washington 63 °F (17 °C), Clear
Team	1	2	3	4	5	6	7	8	9	R	H	E
Detroit	0	0	0	0	0	0	0	2	0	2	3	0
Seattle	0	0	0	1	0	1	0	1	X	3	8	1
WP: Matt Brash (1–0) LP: Kyle Finnegan (0–1) Sv: Andrés Muñoz (1); Home runs: DET: None; SEA: Jorge Polanco 2 (2); Attendance: 47,371; Boxscore

In the bottom of the fourth inning, Jorge Polanco hit a leadoff solo home run off Tigers starter Tarik Skubal to put the Mariners in the lead 1–0. Mariners starter Luis Castillo pitched 4 2/3 innings, allowing one hit and four walks while striking out only three batters. In the top of the fifth inning, Gabe Speier got the Mariners out of a jam as he struck out Kerry Carpenter to keep their one-run lead. In the bottom of the sixth inning, Polanco hit his second home run of the game off Skubal to extend the lead to 2–0. Skubal pitched seven innings, allowing five hits and two earned runs while walking a batter and striking out nine batters. In the top of the eighth, Spencer Torkelson hit a two-run RBI double to tie the game at 2–2. In the bottom of the eighth, Julio Rodríguez hit an RBI double, with Cal Raleigh scoring the go-ahead run for the Mariners to retake the lead at 3–2. Andrés Muñoz got the save for the Mariners as the series was tied at one game each. It was the first home postseason victory for the Mariners since Game 5 of the 2001 ALDS.

=== Game 3 ===
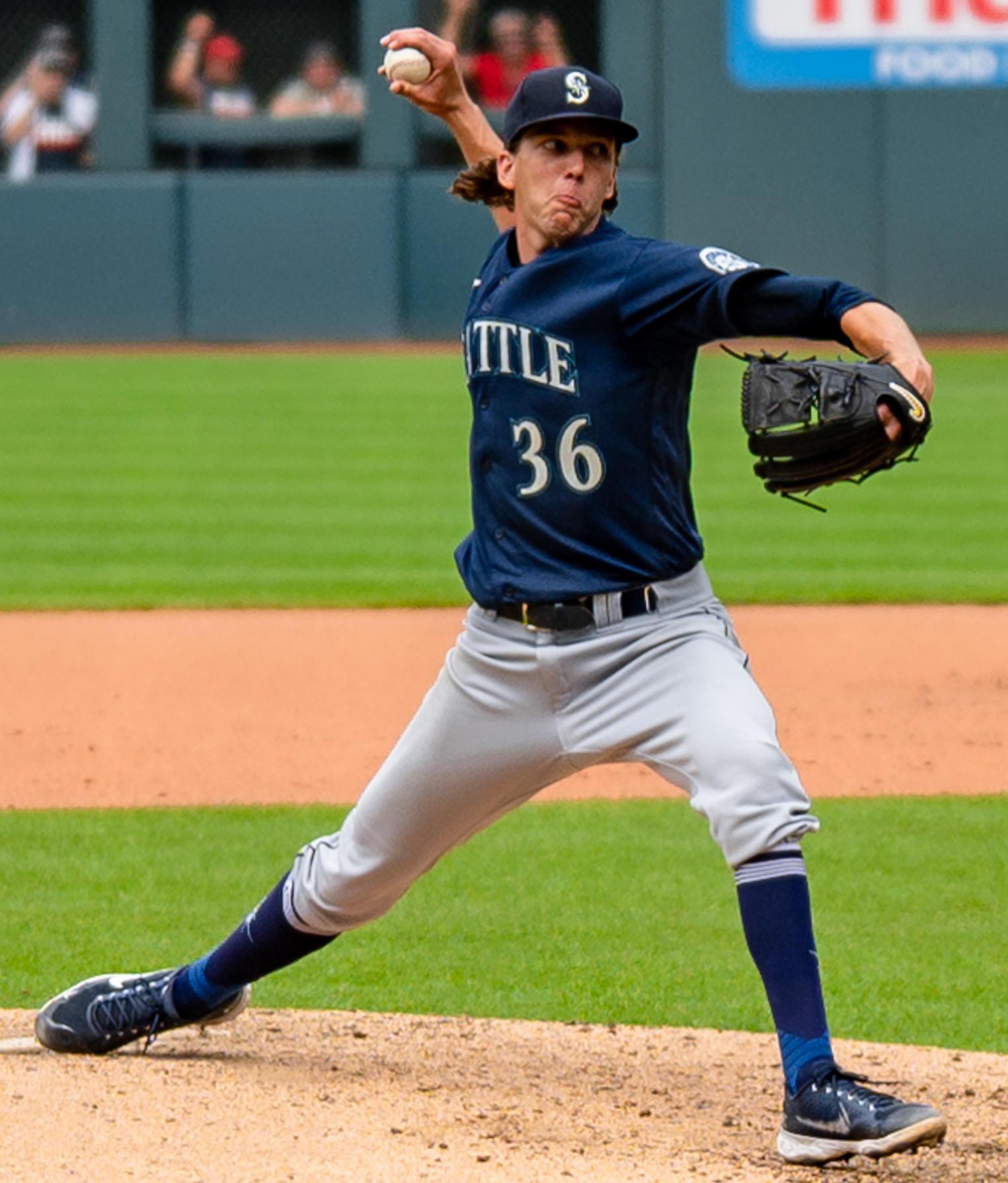
Logan Gilbert struck out seven over six innings in Game 3.

October 7, 2025 7:01 pm (EDT) at Comerica Park in Detroit, Michigan 58 °F (14 °C), Cloudy
Team	1	2	3	4	5	6	7	8	9	R	H	E
Seattle	0	0	2	2	0	1	0	1	2	8	8	0
Detroit	0	0	0	0	1	0	0	0	3	4	7	2
WP: Logan Gilbert (1–0) LP: Jack Flaherty (0−1); Home runs: SEA: Eugenio Suárez (1), J. P. Crawford (1), Cal Raleigh (1); DET: None; Attendance: 41,525; Boxscore

Game 3, originally scheduled for 4:08 pm ET, was delayed due to rain and subsequently moved to 7:00 pm ET. The Mariners scored first in the top of the third inning on a RBI single by J. P. Crawford, scoring Víctor Robles to take a 1–0 lead. Another RBI single by Randy Arozarena scored Crawford to extend the Mariners' lead to 2–0. In the top of the fourth inning, Eugenio Suárez hit a solo home run to further the lead to 3–0. Cal Raleigh then hit an RBI single, scoring Dominic Canzone and bringing the lead to 4–0. Tigers starter Jack Flaherty pitched 3 1/3 innings, allowing four hits and four runs (three earned) while striking out six batters. In the bottom of the fifth inning, Dillon Dingler scored after Kerry Carpenter hit a force out to get the Tigers on the board. In the top of the sixth, Crawford hit a solo home run off Detroit reliever Brant Hurter to extend the Mariners' lead to 5–1. In the top of the eighth inning, Crawford hit a sacrifice fly to left field, scoring Luke Raley and extending the lead to 6–1. Cal Raleigh homered in the top of the ninth inning to add two more runs for the Mariners. In the bottom of the ninth, Spencer Torkelson hit a two-run RBI double to cut the Mariners' lead to 8–3. Andy Ibáñez then scored Torkelson to cut the lead to 8–4, still with nobody out, forcing the Mariners to bring in Andrés Muñoz. The Mariners got the final two outs of the game when Parker Meadows lined into an unassisted double play by first baseman Josh Naylor, with Ibáñez out at first. The Mariners took a 2–1 lead in the series, leaving them one win away from reaching the ALCS for the first time since 2001 and creating a win-or-go-home situation for the Tigers in Game 4.

=== Game 4 ===
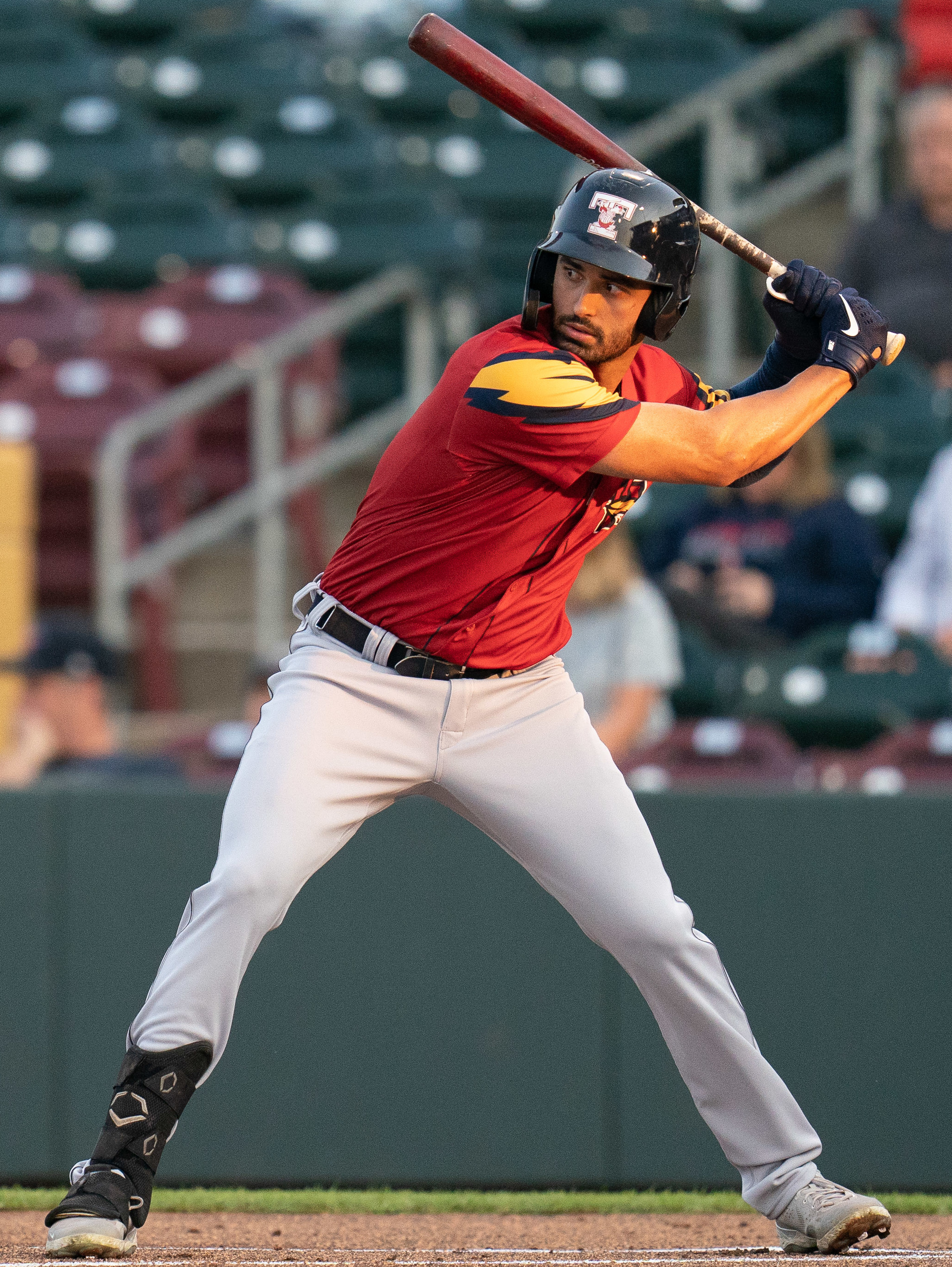
Riley Greene, pictured with the Toledo Mud Hens, hit the go-ahead solo home run in game 4 and helped the Tigers to a 9−3 win.

October 8, 2025 3:08 pm (EDT) at Comerica Park in Detroit, Michigan 62 °F (17 °C), Sunny
Team	1	2	3	4	5	6	7	8	9	R	H	E
Seattle	0	1	0	1	1	0	0	0	0	3	8	0
Detroit	0	0	0	0	3	4	1	1	X	9	13	0
WP: Troy Melton (1–0) LP: Gabe Speier (0–1); Home runs: SEA: None; DET: Riley Greene (1), Javier Báez (1), Gleyber Torres (1); Attendance: 37,069; Boxscore

Josh Naylor scored the game's first run in the top of the second inning off a Dominic Canzone RBI single, giving the Mariners a 1−0 lead. Tigers starter Casey Mize pitched three innings, giving up two hits and one run while striking out two batters. In the top of the fourth inning, Naylor scored when Víctor Robles grounded into a double play, extending the lead to 2−0. In the top of the fifth inning, Randy Arozarena scored on an RBI single by Cal Raleigh, pushing the Mariners' lead to 3−0. In the bottom of the fifth inning, Dillon Dingler scored Zach McKinstry, which cut the Mariners' lead to 3−1. Mariners starting pitcher Bryce Miller pitched 4 1/3 innings, allowing two runs on four hits and two walks while striking out only two batters. Dingler scored later in the fifth inning on an RBI double by Jahmai Jones with the Mariners leading 3−2. Jones would then score on an RBI single by Javier Báez, which tied the game 3−3. In the bottom of the sixth inning, Riley Greene hit a solo home run, giving the Tigers a 4−3 lead. Later in the sixth inning, Spencer Torkelson scored on an RBI single by McKinstry, extending the Tigers' lead 5−3. With two outs in the inning, Wenceel Pérez hit a double, followed by Báez hitting a two-run home run to further extend the lead to 7–3. In the bottom of the seventh inning, Gleyber Torres hit another solo home run for the Tigers, which gave them an 8−3 lead. The Tigers scored their ninth unanswered run in the bottom of the eighth inning, when McKinstry scored on an RBI fielder's choice by Báez, extending the lead to 9−3. Will Vest pitched the ninth inning in a non-save situation to give the Tigers the 9−3 victory and even the series 2−2 to force a winner-take-all Game 5 back in Seattle.

=== Game 5 ===
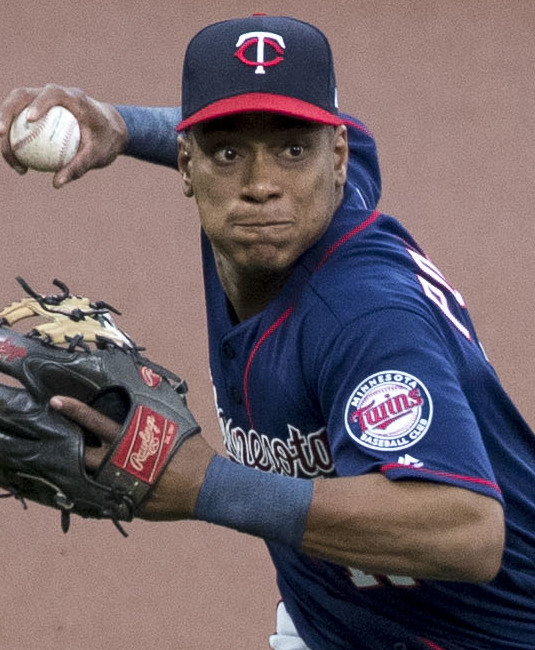
Jorge Polanco, pictured with the Minnesota Twins, hit the game and series-winning walk-off single.

October 10, 2025 5:09 pm (PDT) at T-Mobile Park in Seattle, Washington 61 °F (16 °C), Roof Closed
Team	1	2	3	4	5	6	7	8	9	10	11	12	13	14	15	R	H	E
Detroit	0	0	0	0	0	2	0	0	0	0	0	0	0	0	0	2	8	2
Seattle	0	1	0	0	0	0	1	0	0	0	0	0	0	0	1	3	8	0
WP: Luis Castillo (1−0) LP: Tommy Kahnle (0−1); Home runs: DET: Kerry Carpenter (2); SEA: None; Attendance: 47,025; Boxscore

External videos
- Game 5 full replay on the MLB's official YouTube channel

This was the Mariners' first winner-take-all postseason game since the 2001 ALDS. For the Tigers, this situation mirrored last year, with ace pitcher Tarik Skubal starting on the road for a chance to advance to the ALCS. Skubal, the prospective AL Cy Young Award favorite, was making his fourth start against Seattle this season; the Mariners had won all three previous games.

In the bottom of the second inning, Josh Naylor doubled, stole third, and scored on a Mitch Garver sacrifice fly to center field to take a 1–0 lead for the Mariners. In the top of the sixth inning, Kirby was removed after allowing a double to Javier Baez, and lefty reliever Gabe Speier was brought in to face the left-handed Kerry Carpenter. Carpenter hit a two-run home run to put the Tigers ahead, 2–1. Mariners starter George Kirby pitched five innings, allowing three hits, one run, and one walk while striking out six batters. Tigers starter Skubal pitched six innings, allowing two hits and one run while striking out 13 batters. Kyle Finnegan relieved Skubal in the bottom of the seventh inning. He walked Jorge Polanco with one out and allowed a two-out single to Naylor to put men on first and second. Tyler Holton relieved Finnegan, but blew the lead when pinch-hitter Leo Rivas, batting for Garver, scored Polanco on a RBI single to tie it at two. Holton did escape the inning without further damage by getting Victor Robles to ground into a force play.

Seven scoreless innings followed, although it was not uneventful. The Mariners put a runner in scoring position with no outs to start the tenth against Troy Melton with a leadoff double from Victor Robles and a one-out intentional walk to Cal Raleigh, only for him to escape the jam. The Tigers responded with a Kerry Carpenter single, followed by a passed ball that put Carpenter at second with no outs in the 11th plus an intentional walk to Riley Greene, only for Mariners' starter-turned-reliever Logan Gilbert to strand both by getting Torkelson to fly out and struck out Colt Keith. The Tigers threatened in the 12th when Gilbert allowed a Zach McKinstry infield hit and a Dillon Dingler single, but Eduard Bazardo relieved him, and after a Parker Meadows sacrifice bunt advanced the runners, got Baez to ground out to third with McKinstry out at home, and after an intentional walk to Kerry Carpenter, got Gleyber Torres to fly out to end the inning.The Mariners put a man on second with no outs in both the 12th and the 13th against Montero and starter-turned-reliever Jack Flaherty, only to ground into inning-ending double plays both times with runners on first and second. The Tigers' Dillon Dingler doubled with one out in the 14th off Bazardo, but Game 2 starter Luis Castillo entered in relief and he was stranded. After a scoreless 1-2-3 inning of relief from Castillo in the 15th inning, the Mariners finally broke the tie in the bottom of the 15th inning against Tigers reliever Tommy Kahnle. J. P. Crawford led off with a single, and Arozarena was hit by a pitch to put two men on and nobody out. Kahnle got Cal Raleigh to strike out, but walked Julio Rodriguez to load the bases with one out for Polanco. Polanco singled to right field to score J. P. Crawford and to seal the series and send the Mariners to the ALCS for the first time since 2001.

In Skubal's final five starts, with the division title on the line and in the playoffs, he allowed just six combined earned runs to go along with 51 strikeouts. However, the Tigers went 1–4 in those games. Afterwards, Skubal received some criticism for coming out of the game after throwing just 99 pitches of one-run ball in an elimination game.

Carpenter had four of the five hits for the Tigers and drove in both of the team's runs. The Mariners used three of their starting pitchers in the game (Kirby, Gilbert, and Castillo) while the Tigers deployed Melton, who started in Game 1, and Jack Flaherty, the Game 3 starter, worked in and out of trouble in his two innings pitched in extra innings. For Kahnle, it was the third time in his career that he gave up what would be the winning run(s) to end his team's postseason. This was the longest winner-take-all postseason game in MLB history, both by innings and elapsed time. Game 5 was regarded as an instant classic and one of the best games in MLB postseason history.

This game was nicknamed the "Battle in Seattle" by Mariners local radio announcer Rick Rizzs. One quirk of the game was that due to its length, during the '14th inning stretch', a popular 7th inning stretch activity was repeated: the 'Salmon Run', a race among four mascot characters representing different kinds of salmon. One mascot which had always lost every Salmon Race, Humpy, finally had his first win during the 14th inning mascot race in order to inspire and excite the crowd. As it so happened, the Mariners won the game in a walk-off the next inning.

After the walk-off win for the Mariners, Tigers radio announcer Dan Dickerson unintentionally gave a frustrated rant on a hot mic before cutting into a commercial break. Thinking that he was off the air, the broadcast stayed on during a Corewell Health commercial. Dickerson shouted: "I don't have to do a game [recap], ah fuck. Fuck this game recap! Oh, I'm sorry, was that out loud? 3, 2, 1!" The following day, Dickerson apologized to listeners and addressed the incident in a statement to the Detroit Free Press.

=== Composite line score ===
2025 ALDS (3–2): Seattle Mariners beat Detroit Tigers

Team	1	2	3	4	5	6	7	8	9	10	11	12	13	14	15	R	H	E
Detroit Tigers	0	0	0	0	6	6	1	3	3	0	1	0	0	0	0	20	38	4
Seattle Mariners	0	2	2	5	1	3	1	2	2	0	0	0	0	0	1	19	38	1
Total attendance: 220,280 Average attendance: 44,056

== See also ==
- 2025 National League Division Series
