= Jorge Polanco =

Dominican baseball player (born 1993)

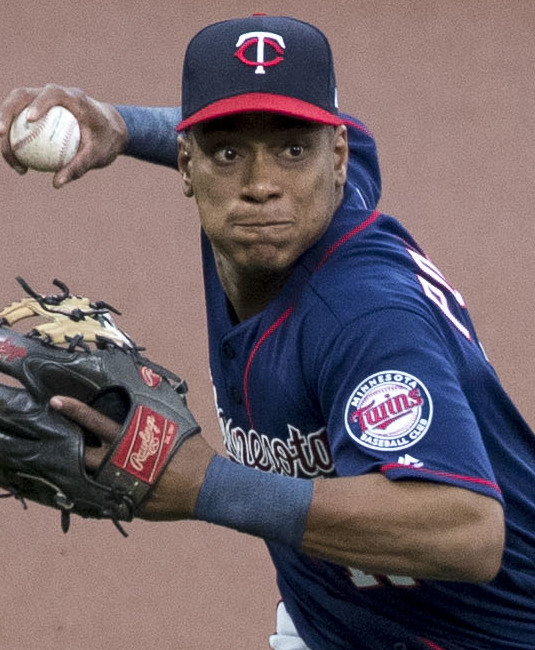
- Polanco with the Minnesota Twins in 2017

New York Mets – No. 11
- Infielder / Designated hitter
- Born: July 5, 1993 (age 33); San Pedro de Macorís, Dominican Republic
- Bats: Switch Throws: Right

MLB debut
- June 26, 2014, for the Minnesota Twins

MLB statistics (through 2026 season)
- Batting average: .259
- Hits: 1,083
- Home runs: 156
- Runs batted in: 576
- Stats at Baseball Reference

Teams
- Minnesota Twins (2014–2023); Seattle Mariners (2024–2025); New York Mets (2026–present)

Career highlights and awards
- All-Star (2019)

Jorge Luis Pacheco Polanco (born July 5, 1993) is a Dominican professional baseball infielder and designated hitter for the New York Mets of Major League Baseball (MLB). He has previously played in MLB for the Minnesota Twins and Seattle Mariners. Polanco made his MLB debut in 2014 and was an MLB All-Star in 2019.

== Career ==
=== Minnesota Twins ===
==== 2009–2013 Signing and minor leagues ====
Polanco signed with the Minnesota Twins as an international free agent in 2009, receiving a $725,000 bonus. He made his debut in 2010 for the Dominican Summer League Twins. He also played for the Gulf Coast League Twins that year and hit .233./303/.294 with both teams. In Florida, he was roommates with future Twins teammate Max Kepler. Polanco remained with the GCL Twins in 2011, hitting .250/.319/.349 in 51 games. Polanco later said it was difficult to adjust to the culture of the United States. After the 2011 season, he also improved his diet.

Playing for the Elizabethton Twins in 2012, Polanco hit .318/.388/.514 with five home runs in 51 games. He played the 2013 season for the Cedar Rapids Kernels hitting .308/.362/.452 and five home runs in 115 games. He was named a mid-season All-Star. After the season, he played for the Leones del Escogido of the Dominican Professional Baseball League, where he would play the next three offseasons, as well. In November, he was added to the Twins 40-man roster.

==== 2014–2015: MLB debut and minor league promotions ====
Polanco started the 2014 season with the Class-A Advanced Fort Myers Miracle. He was called up to the majors for the first time on June 26. He made his MLB debut that day, drawing a walk as a pinch hitter. He played 4 games for the Twins, batting 2-for-5 with two walks and playing shortstop, before being sent back down to Fort Myers. He returned to the Twins for one game in late July, striking out in his only at bat. After that game, he was sent to the Double-A New Britain Rock Cats, where he finished the season. In 88 minor league games, he hit .288/.353/.395.

Polanco started 2015 back in Double-A, now with the Chattanooga Lookouts. He was called up to the Twins, making his second career MLB start and committing his first MLB error on June 10, before returning to Chattanooga. He was named a Southern League All-Star with the Lookouts. On July 4, he was promoted to the Triple-A Rochester Red Wings. He again briefly returned to the Twins in late July, batting 2-for-7 with 1 RBI in three games, before finishing out the season in Triple-A. After the season, both MLB.com and Baseball America ranked Polanco near the bottom of their top 100 prospects lists.

==== 2016–2018: Twins regular and PED suspension ====
Polanco got his first extensive playing time in the majors in 2016, playing in 69 games. He started the season in Rochester and was promoted to the Twins after 10 games. He was demoted back to Triple-A for two months starting in late May, but returned to the Twins on July 30. He was a minor league All-Star for the third time in four seasons while with Rochester. He hit .282 with 4 home runs and 27 runs batted in for Minnesota.

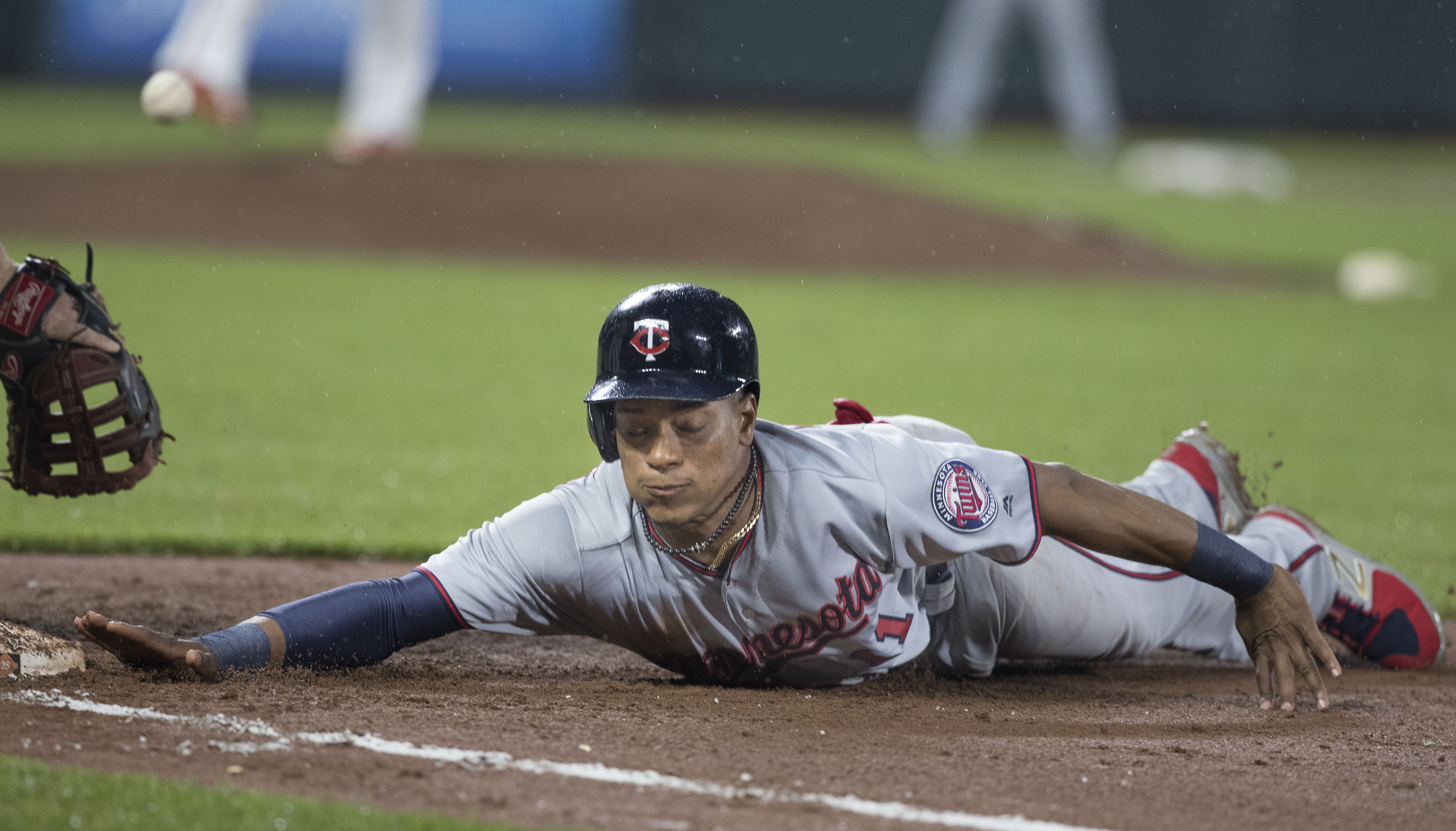
Polanco in 2017

In 2017, Polanco was the primary shortstop for the Twins, hitting .256 with 13 home runs, 74 RBIs, and a career high 13 stolen bases in 133 games. On August 29, he hit home runs as both a right-handed and left-handed batter in the same game. He made his postseason debut, batting 1-for-4 and scoring twice as the Twins lost to the New York Yankees in the Wild Card Game.

On March 18, 2018, Polanco was suspended for 80 games after testing positive for stanozolol, a performance-enhancing drug. In a written statement, Polanco accepted his punishment and said he did not intentionally consume the steroid. He was also ineligible to play in the postseason, though the Twins finished below .500 and out of the playoffs. He was reinserted as the Twins shortstop upon his return from suspension. In 77 games, he hit .288 with 6 home runs and 42 RBIs.

==== 2019: Contract extension and All-Star ====
During spring training in 2019, Polanco signed a five-year contract extension worth $25.75 million with club options for the 2024 and 2025 seasons. On April 5, Polanco hit for the cycle against the Philadelphia Phillies, going 5-for-5 with one RBI in a 10–4 loss.

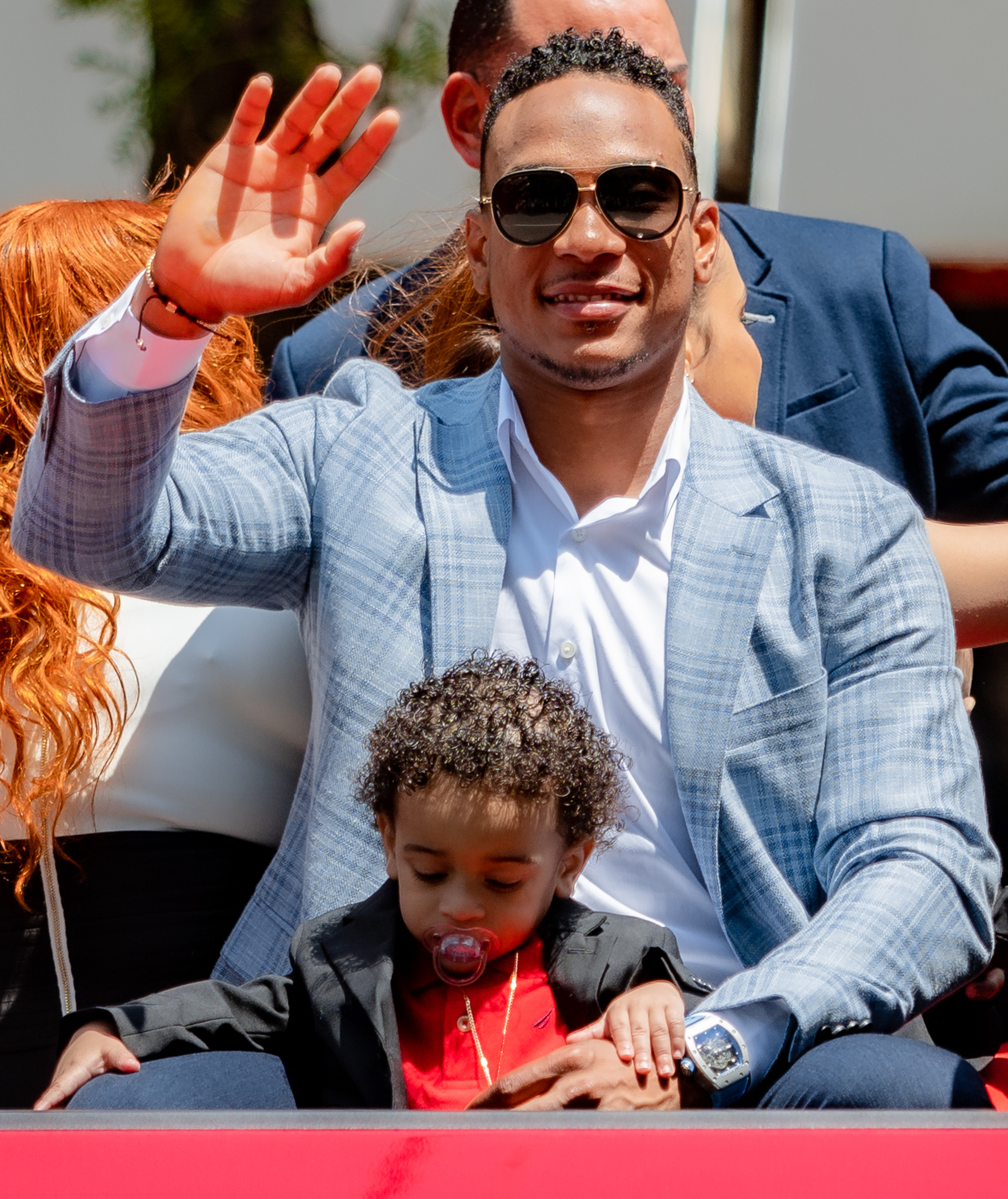
Polanco (top) before the 2019 All-Star Game

Polanco was the American League starting shortstop in the All-Star Game, besting Gleyber Torres and Carlos Correa in fan voting. He was batting .321 on June 30, shortly after voting results were announced, but he cooled off, batting .267 the rest of the season. Polanco finished with a .295 batting average in 153 games. He hit 22 home runs, drove in 79 RBI, and scored 107 runs. In his return to the playoffs, he homered in Game 1 of the American League Division Series (ALDS) and hit .273 in three games as the Twins again lost to the Yankees. He has his first ankle surgery after the season.

==== 2020–2023: Position changes ====
In 2020, Polanco hit .258 with 4 home runs and 19 RBI in 55 games. He batted 1-for-7 as the Twins lost to the Houston Astros in the Wild Card Series. He underwent offseason ankle surgery for the second consecutive year.

In 2021, the Twins signed Andrelton Simmons to play shortstop, so Polanco became a second baseman. Polanco batted .269/.323/.503 and set career highs with 33 home runs and 98 RBIs. He began pulling the ball more and hitting more line drives and fly balls. He was named the Twins' MVP and most improved player for 2021.

In 2022, Polanco hit .235, the lowest average of his career thus far, but he offset his low average with 64 walks and 16 home runs in 104 games. He walked in 14.4 percent of plate appearances, sixth best among batters with at least 400 plate appearances. Manager Rocco Baldelli later said Polanco could barely walk or swing a bat in 2022 due to his injuries.

Polanco hit his 100th career home run on April 28, 2023. He began the season still playing second base. After two trips to the injured list with hamstring injuries in May and June, Polanco moved over to third base, displaced by rookie Edouard Julien at second base. On September 30, Baldelli named Polanco and Kyle Farmer the unofficial co-managers of the game, assisting him in exchanging lineup cards and making pitching substitutions. Polanco hit .255/.335/.454 in 80 games in 2023, his fewest since his drug suspension in 2018. While the Twins won their first postseason series in 21 years, Polanco hit poorly, going 4-for-21 in the playoffs with a home run in Game 1 of the ALDS.

After the season, the Twins exercised their $10.5 million option on Polanco for the 2024 season.

=== Seattle Mariners ===
On January 29, 2024, the Twins traded Polanco to the Seattle Mariners for pitchers Anthony DeSclafani and Justin Topa, prospects Gabriel González and Darren Bowen, and cash. In 118 games for Seattle, Polanco slashed .213/.296/.355, the worst batting average and on-base percentage of his career, with 16 home runs and 45 RBI. He had a career-high 137 strikeouts. He was also the 14th worst defender in baseball, according to Statcast, playing second base. However, he and teammate Leo Rivas did win MLB's "play of the week" award for a double play against the New York Mets in early August. On October 10, Polanco underwent surgery to repair the patellar tendon in his left knee. On November 1, the Mariners declined his $12 million option for the 2025 season, paying him a $750,000 buyout making him a free agent.

On February 3, 2025, the Mariners re-signed Polanco to a one-year, $7 million contract with $3 million in possible incentives. On April 28, Polanco was named the American League Player of the Week for the fifth week of the season after going 8-for-17 (.471) with four home runs, two doubles, two walks, eight RBI, and five runs scored. Polanco won the honor a week after his teammate Dylan Moore earned the award for the Mariners. It was the first time since Alex Rodriguez and Ken Griffey Jr. in 1998 that Seattle players have won the award in consecutive weeks. However, Polanco slumped soon after winning the award, batting .183 with 2 home runs in May and June. He hit a walk-off single against Cleveland Guardians closer Emmanuel Clase on June 14. On July 6, Polanco recorded his 1,000th career hit with a first inning single off Paul Skenes of the Pittsburgh Pirates. Polanco rebounded, batting .282 with 15 home runs in the final three months of the season. He hit doubles in 7 consecutive games from September 8–14, tied for a franchise record, and hit 10 doubles during that stretch, tied for the second-most in major league history. He finished the regular season batting .265/.326/.495, starting regularly at second base and designated hitter.

On October 5, in Game 2 of the American League Division Series, Polanco hit a home run twice in the game, both off of Tarik Skubal, to put the Mariners on the board: 1–0 in the bottom of the fourth and 2–0 in the bottom of the sixth. The Mariners went on to win the game 3–2. In Game 5, Polanco hit a game-winning RBI single in the 15th inning to send the Mariners to their first ALCS since 2001. On November 5, he declined his player option for 2026 and became a free agent.

=== New York Mets ===
On December 16, 2025, Polanco signed a two-year, $40 million contract with the New York Mets. On April 18, 2026, Polanco was placed on the injured list due to a right wrist contusion. After experiencing soreness during his rehabilitation with the Triple-A Syracuse Mets, Polanco was transferred to the 60-day injured list on June 15. He was activated on July 7. Polanco made 37 total appearances for the Mets, batting .148/.201/.230 with two home runs and six RBI. On August 19, manager Andy Green announced that Polanco would require season–ending ankle surgery.

== Personal life ==
Polanco and his wife have four children.

Polanco signed with the Twins in 2009 at the home of his grandparents, Maximo Polanco and Melida Pegero, with both his mother's and father's family present. Maximo, who raised Jorge for many years and taught him how to swim, died in 2017.

Polanco grew up playing baseball with future Twins teammate Miguel Sanó. Their mothers worked together.

== See also ==
- List of Major League Baseball players suspended for performance-enhancing drugs

Achievements
Preceded by Brock Holt	Hitting for the cycle April 5, 2019	Succeeded by Shohei Ohtani
