= Luis Castillo (pitcher, born 1992) =

Dominican baseball player (born 1992)

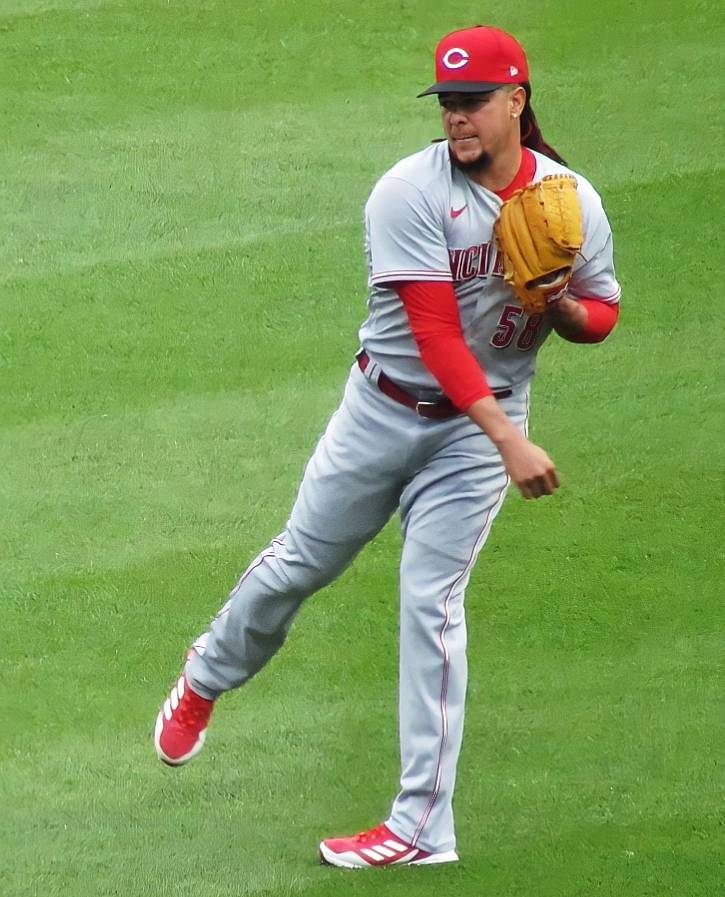
- Castillo with the Cincinnati Reds in 2022

Colorado Rockies – No. 58
- Pitcher
- Born: December 12, 1992 (age 33); Baní, Dominican Republic
- Bats: Right Throws: Right

MLB debut
- June 23, 2017, for the Cincinnati Reds

MLB statistics (through 2026 season)
- Win–loss record: 88–95
- Earned run average: 3.75
- Strikeouts: 1,605
- Stats at Baseball Reference

Teams
- Cincinnati Reds (2017–2022); Seattle Mariners (2022–2026); Chicago White Sox (2026)

Career highlights and awards
- 3× All-Star (2019, 2022, 2023)

Luis Miguel Castillo (born December 12, 1992) is a Dominican professional baseball pitcher for the Colorado Rockies of Major League Baseball (MLB). He has previously played in MLB for the Cincinnati Reds, Seattle Mariners and Chicago White Sox. Castillo made his MLB debut in 2017 with the Reds and is a three-time All-Star selection. Cincinnati traded him to Seattle during the 2022 season, and he signed a contract extension that fall. The Mariners traded him to the White Sox in August 2026, who then traded him to the Rockies in November 2026.

== Professional career ==
=== San Francisco Giants ===
Castillo signed with the San Francisco Giants as an international free agent in December 2011. Castillo only pitched as a reliever in the Giants' farm system. He made his professional debut in 2012 with the DSL Giants, going 1–3 with a 3.31 ERA in 54 1/3 innings pitched. In 2013, he returned there, going 0–1 with a 0.64 ERA in 27 appearances. In 2014, he came to the United States, pitching for the Augusta GreenJackets where he had a 2–2 record and 3.07 ERA in 48 appearances.

=== Miami Marlins ===
On December 20, 2014, Castillo and Kendry Flores were traded to the Miami Marlins for Casey McGehee. Castillo started 2015 with the Greensboro Grasshoppers and was promoted to the Jupiter Hammerheads in July. In 35 games, 16 of them starts, with the two teams, he was 6–6 with a 3.20 ERA.

Castillo began 2016 with Jupiter and was promoted to the Jacksonville Suns in August. In 26 games, only two of them in relief, between Jupiter and Jacksonville, he was 8–6 with a 2.26 ERA. The Marlins added Castillo to their 40-man roster after the season.

Castillo was part of a scuttled trade that briefly made him a member of the San Diego Padres organization in the summer of 2016. On July 29, the Marlins traded Castillo along with Jarred Cosart, Josh Naylor, and Carter Capps to the Padres for pitchers Andrew Cashner, Colin Rea, and Tayron Guerrero. However, Castillo returned to the Marlins two days later, after Rea exited his first start as a Marlin with an elbow injury and was sent back to the Padres. Castillo never pitched in the Padres organization.

=== Cincinnati Reds ===
On January 19, 2017, the Marlins traded Castillo, Austin Brice, and Isaiah White to the Cincinnati Reds for starter Dan Straily. Castillo began 2017 with the Pensacola Blue Wahoos. In 14 starts in Double-A, he had a 4–4 record and 2.58 ERA.

On June 23, 2017, the Reds promoted Castillo, who made his MLB debut against the Washington Nationals. Castillo pitched for the Reds the rest of the season, going 3–7 with a 3.12 ERA in 15 starts. He returned to Cincinnati's starting rotation in 2018: in 31 starts, he posted a record of 10–12 with an ERA of 4.30 in 169 2/3 innings.

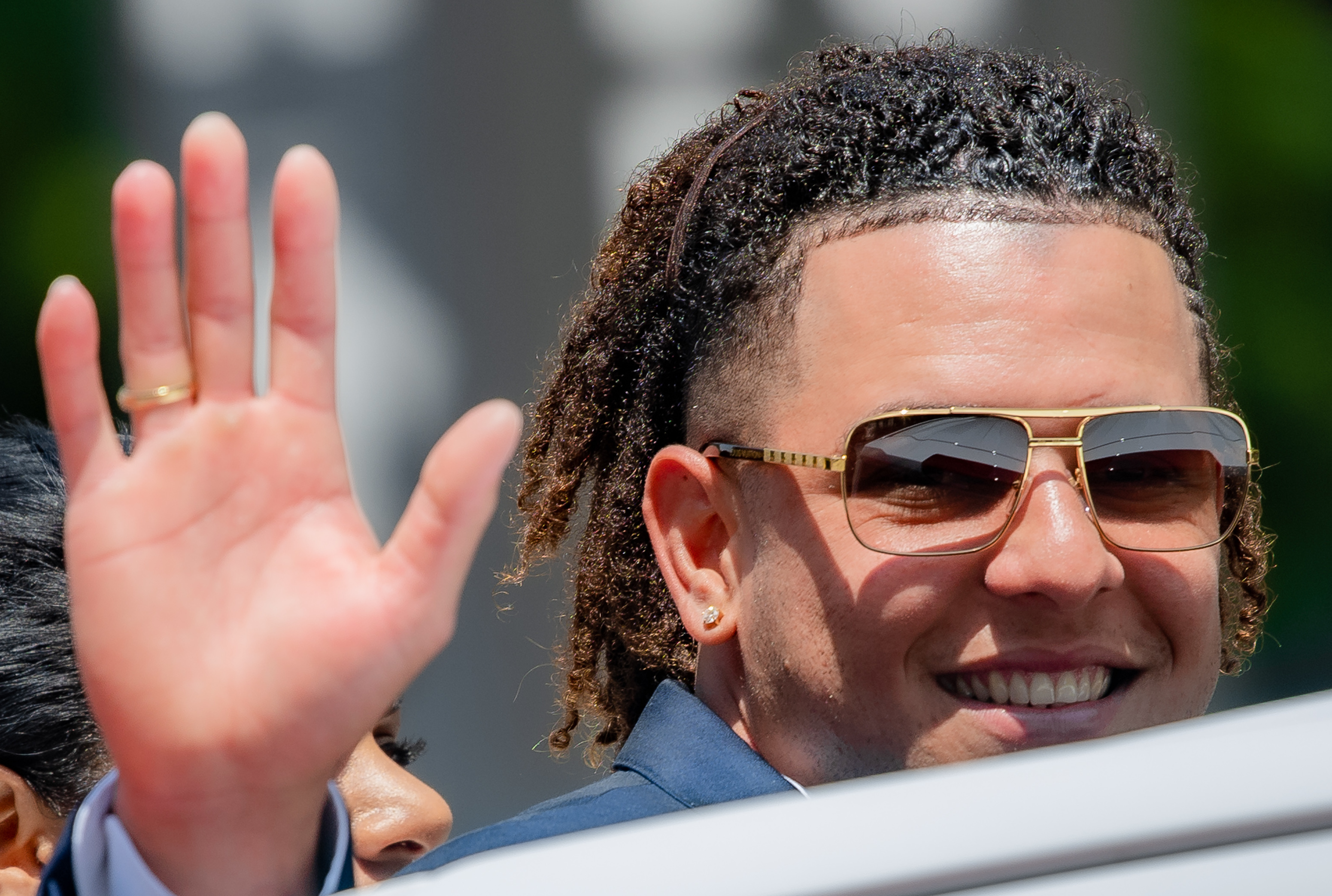
Castillo before the 2019 All-Star Game

On March 19, 2019, Castillo was named the Reds' Opening Day starter. He was named the National League Pitcher of the Month for April. He set career highs with 15 wins, 226 strikeouts, and 79 walks in 2019, posting a 3.40 ERA in 190 2/3 innings. He was named to his first All-Star Game, where he pitched a clean inning, striking out Carlos Santana and J.D. Martinez.

In the abbreviated 2020 season, Castillo had a 4–6 record and a 3.21 ERA with 89 strikeouts in 70 innings of work. He started Game 2 of the Wild Card Series, picking up the loss against the Atlanta Braves after allowing one run in five innings in his postseason debut.

In 2021, Castillo recorded a 3.98 ERA with 192 strikeouts in 187 2/3 innings over 33 starts. He tied for the MLB lead with 16 losses and led the NL with 75 walks. He induced the most groundballs of all major league pitchers.

On March 22, 2022, Castillo signed a $7.35 million contract with the Reds, avoiding salary arbitration. He missed the first month of 2022 and started the year with a 4–4 record and 2.86 ERA in 14 starts with the Reds. He was the Reds' lone selection to the All-Star Game, where he struck out two batters and allowed a single in an inning of work.

=== Seattle Mariners ===
On July 29, 2022, the Reds traded Castillo to the Seattle Mariners in exchange for prospects Noelvi Marte, Edwin Arroyo, Andrew Moore, and Levi Stoudt. On September 24, Castillo signed a five-year, $108 million contract with a sixth-year option.

Castillo had a 3.19 ERA in 11 starts with Seattle in 2022. He helped the Mariners end their 21-year playoff drought. In Game 1 of the American League (AL) Wild Card Series, Castillo threw 7 1/3 scoreless innings, striking out five and allowing six hits in a 4–0 Mariners win. Castillo was the first Mariners starter to pitch at least seven innings in the postseason without allowing a run. He started Game 2 of the AL Division Series and continued his scoreless postseason streak until allowing a two-run home run to Yordan Alvarez in the sixth inning and taking the loss against the Houston Astros.

Castillo started on Opening Day in 2023, earning a win over the Cleveland Guardians after throwing six scoreless innings. Castillo had an ERA of 2.84 after three months and was named to his third All-Star Game, though he sat out the Midsummer Classic in Seattle. He faded slightly in the second half, finishing the year with a 14–9 record and 3.34 ERA, with 219 strikeouts in 197 innings. Castillo finished fifth in AL Cy Young Award voting and had the fifth-lowest ERA in the league.

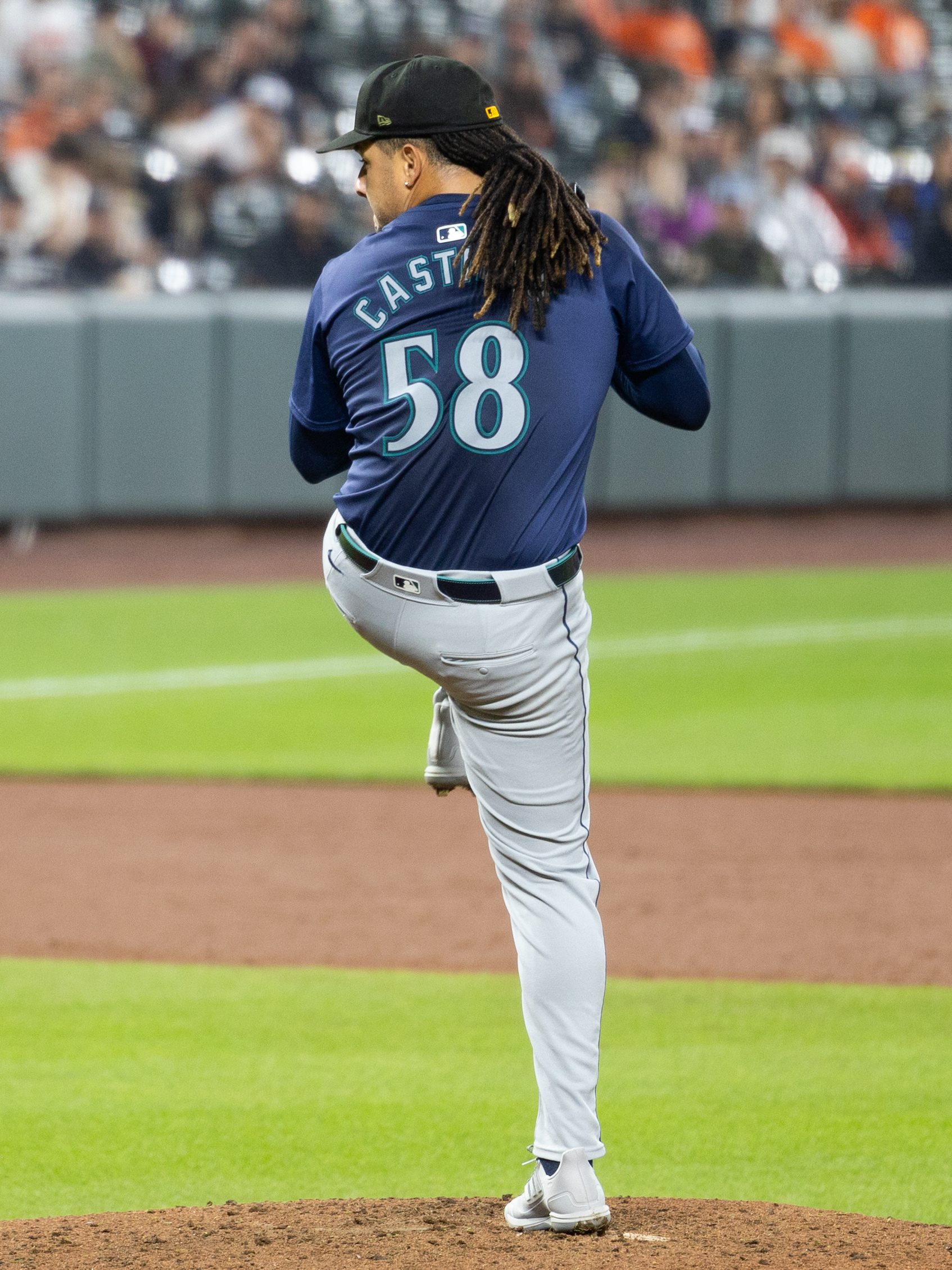
Castillo in 2024

Castillo was the Mariners' Opening Day starter again in 2024, this time losing to the Boston Red Sox. After a rough first three starts, in which he gave up four earned runs in each outing and could not finish the sixth inning, Castillo returned to form the rest of the season, posting a 3.33 ERA after April 8, nearly matching his 2023 run prevention rate. His season ended early, with a hamstring injury sending him to the injured list on September 10. In 2024, he was 11–12 with a 3.64 ERA and 175 strikeouts in 175 1/3 innings pitched.

Luis Castillo’s 2025 season began on March 28 in his start against the Athletics in Seattle. Despite striking out 4 batters and giving up 2 runs in 5 innings of work, he earned the loss. Castillo would earn his first win of the season in his following start against the Detroit Tigers, again giving up 2 runs, and striking out 5 across 7 innings. Castillo’s ERA would remain below 4.00 for the first four months of the season. However, his ERA for the entire season was 2.60 at home in 100 ^{1}/_{3} innings and 4.71 on the road in 80 ^{1}/_{3} innings. Though his ERA rose to 3.94 by September 1, Castillo did eventually lower it to 3.54 on the season. He allowed just 3 runs and struck out 24 batters in 25 ^{1}/_{3} innings, posting a 1.07 ERA across his final four starts of the regular season.

The Seattle Mariners made the postseason with their first place finish in the AL West, facing the Detroit Tigers in the 2025 ALDS. Castillo started in Game 2 of the ALDS at T-Mobile Park on October 5. He pitched 4 2/3 scoreless innings, allowing one hit and four walks, while striking out 3 batters. Game 5 of this series would go 15 innings, forcing Mariners manager Dan Wilson to bring Luis Castillo into the game in relief in the 14th inning. Castillo got Javier Baez to pop-up to first baseman Josh Naylor with two pitches and pitched a scoreless 1-2-3 15th inning. The Mariners would score in the home half of that inning, earning Castillo the win in the nearly 5 hour game and sending the Mariners to their first American League Championship Series in 24 years. Castillo would start Game 4 of the 2025 ALCS, going only 2^{1}/_{3} innings, and allowing 3 runs off 5 hits with one strikeout. He was the losing pitcher of the game and the Mariners were eventually eliminated from the postseason by the Toronto Blue Jays in 7 games.

Castillo began the 2026 season with the Mariners, starting their fifth game of the season against the New York Yankees on March 30. He pitched 6 innings giving up three hits and allowing no runs. The Mariners utilized Castillo in relief as the season progressed and his performance on the mound became less reliable. His six appearances from May 19 to June 19 were split between starting and relief appearances.

=== Chicago White Sox ===
On August 1, 2026, the Mariners traded Castillo to the Chicago White Sox in exchange for Seranthony Domínguez, Nolan Jones, and Boston Smith. He was moved to the bullpen in September after posting a 7.76 ERA in seven appearances. A week later, he was placed on the injured list, which kept him off the team's postseason roster.

=== Colorado Rockies ===
On November 19, 2026, the White Sox traded Castillo and Davis Martin to the Colorado Rockies for Sean Sullivan and Doug Veliz.

== Player profile ==
Castillo pitches from a sidearm arm slot, with his arm angle lowering over the course of his career. Early in his career, he combined a good changeup to go along with a fastball that averaged between 95 and 97 miles per hour and a slider. In 2019, he had the most valuable changeup in baseball. He used four-seam fastballs and sliders against left-handers, while using two-seamers and changeups against right-handers as strikeout pitches.

Over time, Castillo's changeup became less effective and less used. While his changeup was his most frequently thrown pitch from 2019 to 2021, thrown at least 30 percent of the time each season, he relied more on his fastball starting in 2022, increasing his fastball usage from 29 percent in 2021 to 45 percent in 2024. He had one of the 10 most valuable fastballs in each season from 2022 to 2024. His changeup dropped to his fourth most frequent pitch, thrown only 14 percent of the time in 2024.

After joining the Mariners in 2022, Castillo also limited his walks. He walked 8.8 percent of batters faced in his first five seasons with the Reds, leading the league in walks in 2021, but reduced his walk rate to 6.8 percent in his first two full seasons in Seattle.

In August 2026, shortly after he was traded to the White Sox, Castillo was named one of the 50 greatest Mariners players.

== Personal life ==
Castillo and his wife have two daughters. He enjoys fishing.

Castillo's baseball idol was Pedro Martínez, who gave him advice on throwing a changeup.

Castillo is nicknamed "La Piedra" (transl. The Rock in Spanish.) He dressed up as Dwayne "The Rock" Johnson for a Mariners television commercial in 2024.
