= 2019 Major League Baseball All-Star Game =

2019 American baseball competition

	1	2	3	4	5	6	7	8	9	R	H	E
National League	0	0	0	0	0	1	0	2	0	3	5	0
American League	0	1	0	0	1	0	2	0	X	4	8	0
- Date: July 9, 2019
- Venue: Progressive Field
- City: Cleveland, Ohio
- Managers: Dave Roberts (LAD); Alex Cora (BOS)
- MVP: Shane Bieber (CLE)
- Attendance: 36,747
- Ceremonial first pitch: CC Sabathia
- Television: Fox (United States); MLB International (International)
- TV announcers: Joe Buck, John Smoltz, Ken Rosenthal and Tom Verducci (Fox); Dan Shulman and Buck Martinez (MLB International)
- Radio: ESPN
- Radio announcers: Jon Sciambi and Chris Singleton

The 2019 Major League Baseball All-Star Game was the 90th Major League Baseball All-Star Game. The game was hosted by the Cleveland Indians and was played at Progressive Field on July 9, 2019, with the American League prevailing over the National League, 4–3.

The decision to name Cleveland the host city was announced on January 27, 2017, by Major League Baseball Commissioner Rob Manfred. It was the sixth All-Star Game in Cleveland, and the first since 1997; this established the Indians as the team to have hosted the most All-Star Games, breaking a four-way tie with the Pittsburgh Pirates, St. Louis Cardinals, and Cincinnati Reds, who have each hosted the game five times. It was also the first time since 2014 that an American League team has hosted the event. That All-Star Game also coincided with the 25th anniversary of Progressive Field and made it the second All-Star Game hosted by that ballpark.

Alex Cora of the defending World Series champion Boston Red Sox managed the American League, and Dave Roberts of the Los Angeles Dodgers managed the National League for the second consecutive year. The Houston Astros once again led all of baseball with a record six players selected to the All-Star roster, including four starters.

== Host selection ==
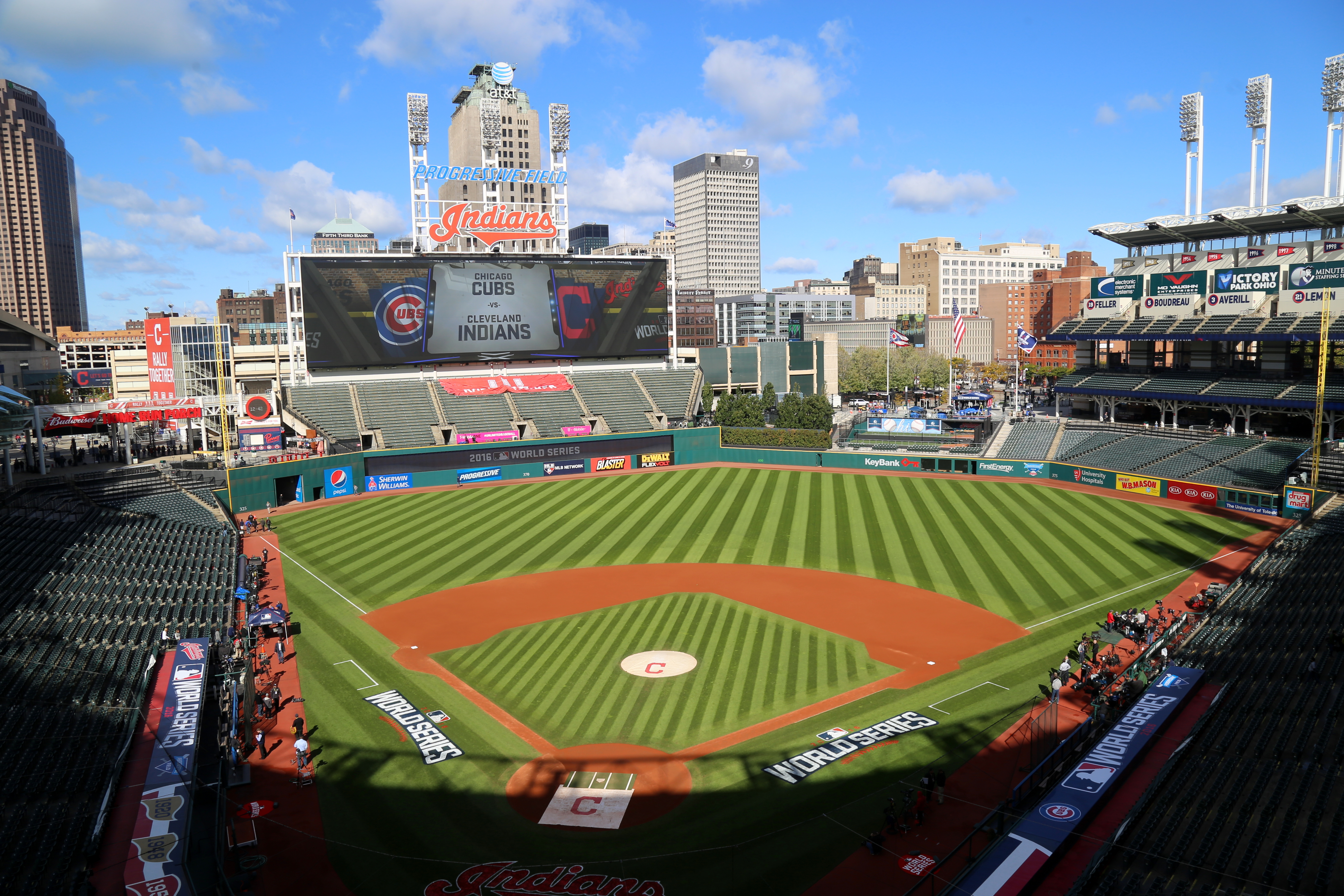
Cleveland's on-field successes led to an appearance in the 2016 World Series, and the city's positive response to the event factored into its selection to host the 2019 All-Star Game.

Bidding for the 2019 All-Star Game began roughly five years before in 2014, according to Indians owner Paul Dolan. The selection of Cleveland to host the 2019 All-Star Game was heavily influenced by three major factors. The first involves recent improvement and growth throughout downtown Cleveland. The second factor is the recent success enjoyed by the Indians which culminated in an appearance in the 2016 World Series. Commissioner Manfred spoke highly of the city and its response to the World Series, stating that, "Cleveland's a baseball town and it will be a great host for the Midsummer Classic." Recent renovations and improvements in Progressive Field were the third factor influencing the decision to name the ballpark as the All-Star Game host for the second time.

This marked the sixth time the Indians have hosted the All-Star Game, more than any other team. Likewise, this is the sixth All-Star Game played in Cleveland, the third most All-Star Games hosted by any city, only trailing New York (nine games hosted by four teams) and Chicago (seven games hosted by two teams).

== Fan balloting ==
Voting for the All-Star game was changed from previous years. "Primary" voting lasted from on May 28 to June 21. The "primary" determined the top three vote-getters at every infield position and top nine vote-getters in the outfield for both the American and National Leagues. From this group of finalists, fans determined the All-Star Game starters. Voting ran from June 26 to 27.

Unlike the format from previous years, which allowed fans to vote on a standard ballot up to 35 times, they could vote up to five times per day during the "primary" but only once during the final voting which determined the starting lineups. The "Starters Election" winners are highlighted below.

The remainder of the rosters, including all pitchers, were selected by player vote and input from both managers.

Full rosters were announced on June 30.

American League
Player	Team
Catcher
Robinson Chirinos	Astros
James McCann	White Sox
Gary Sánchez	Yankees
First baseman
C. J. Cron	Twins
Carlos Santana	Indians
Luke Voit	Yankees
Second baseman
Jose Altuve	Astros
Tommy La Stella	Angels
DJ LeMahieu	Yankees
Shortstop
Carlos Correa	Astros
Jorge Polanco	Twins
Gleyber Torres	Yankees
Third baseman
Alex Bregman	Astros
Hunter Dozier	Royals
Gio Urshela	Yankees
Outfield
Mookie Betts	Red Sox
Michael Brantley	Astros
Joey Gallo	Rangers
Aaron Judge	Yankees
Austin Meadows	Rays
Josh Reddick	Astros
Eddie Rosario	Twins
George Springer	Astros
Mike Trout	Angels
Designated hitter
Nelson Cruz	Twins
J. D. Martinez	Red Sox
Hunter Pence	Rangers

National League
Player	Team
Catcher
Willson Contreras	Cubs
Yasmani Grandal	Brewers
Brian McCann	Braves
First baseman
Josh Bell	Pirates
Freddie Freeman	Braves
Anthony Rizzo	Cubs
Second baseman
Ozzie Albies	Braves
Ketel Marte	Diamondbacks
Mike Moustakas	Brewers
Shortstop
Javier Báez	Cubs
Trevor Story	Rockies
Dansby Swanson	Braves
Third baseman
Nolan Arenado	Rockies
Kris Bryant	Cubs
Josh Donaldson	Braves
Outfield
Ronald Acuña Jr.	Braves
Jason Heyward	Cubs
Cody Bellinger	Dodgers
Charlie Blackmon	Rockies
Kyle Schwarber	Cubs
Nick Markakis	Braves
Joc Pederson	Dodgers
Albert Almora	Cubs
Christian Yelich	Brewers

== Rosters ==
=== National League ===
Elected starters
Position	Player	Team	All-Star Games
C	Willson Contreras	Cubs	2
1B	Freddie Freeman	Braves	4
2B	Ketel Marte	Diamondbacks	1
3B	Nolan Arenado	Rockies	5
SS	Javier Báez	Cubs	2
OF	Ronald Acuña, Jr.	Braves	1
OF	Cody Bellinger	Dodgers	2
OF	Christian Yelich	Brewers	2

Reserves
Position	Player	Team	All-Star Games
C	Yasmani Grandal	Brewers	2
C	J. T. Realmuto	Phillies	2
1B	Pete Alonso	Mets	1
1B	Josh Bell	Pirates	1
1B	Max Muncy^{[F]}	Dodgers	1
2B	Mike Moustakas	Brewers	3
3B	Kris Bryant	Cubs	3
3B	Anthony Rendon^{#}	Nationals	1
SS	Paul DeJong	Cardinals	1
SS	Trevor Story	Rockies	2
OF	Charlie Blackmon	Rockies	4
OF	David Dahl	Rockies	1
OF	Jeff McNeil	Mets	1

Pitchers
Player	Team	All-Star Games
Sandy Alcántara	Marlins	1
Walker Buehler	Dodgers	1
Luis Castillo	Reds	1
Jacob deGrom	Mets	3
Sonny Gray^{[J]}	Reds	2
Zack Greinke^{#}	Diamondbacks	6
Josh Hader^{#}	Brewers	2
Clayton Kershaw	Dodgers	8
Hyun-jin Ryu	Dodgers	1
Max Scherzer^{#}	Nationals	7
Will Smith	Giants	1
Mike Soroka	Braves	1
Felipe Vázquez^{[K]}	Pirates	2
Brandon Woodruff^{[L]}	Brewers	1
Kirby Yates	Padres	1

=== American League ===
Elected starters
Position	Player	Team	All-Star Games
C	Gary Sánchez	Yankees	2
1B	Carlos Santana	Indians	1
2B	DJ LeMahieu	Yankees	3
3B	Alex Bregman	Astros	2
SS	Jorge Polanco	Twins	1
OF	George Springer	Astros	3
OF	Mike Trout	Angels	8
OF	Michael Brantley	Astros	4
DH	Hunter Pence^{#}	Rangers	4

Reserves
Position	Player	Team	All-Star Games
C	James McCann	White Sox	1
1B	José Abreu	White Sox	3
1B	Daniel Vogelbach	Mariners	1
2B	Tommy La Stella^{#}	Angels	1
2B	Brandon Lowe^{[A]}^{#}	Rays	1
2B	Gleyber Torres^{[C]}	Yankees	2
3B	Matt Chapman	Athletics	1
SS	Xander Bogaerts^{[D]}	Red Sox	2
SS	Francisco Lindor	Indians	4
OF	Mookie Betts	Red Sox	4
OF	Joey Gallo	Rangers	1
OF	Austin Meadows	Rays	1
OF	Whit Merrifield	Royals	1
DH	J. D. Martinez^{[E]}	Red Sox	3

Pitchers
Player	Team	All-Star Games
José Berríos^{[B]}	Twins	2
Shane Bieber^{[G]}	Indians	1
Aroldis Chapman	Yankees	6
Gerrit Cole	Astros	3
Shane Greene	Tigers	1
Lucas Giolito	White Sox	1
Brad Hand	Indians	3
Liam Hendriks^{[H]}	Athletics	1
John Means	Orioles	1
Mike Minor^{#}	Rangers	1
Charlie Morton^{#}	Rays	2
Jake Odorizzi^{#}	Twins	1
Ryan Pressly	Astros	1
Marcus Stroman^{#}	Blue Jays	1
Masahiro Tanaka^{[I]}	Yankees	2
Justin Verlander	Astros	8

==== Roster notes ====
1. Brandon Lowe was named as the roster replacement for Tommy La Stella due to injury.
2. José Berríos was named as the roster replacement for Jake Odorizzi due to injury.
3. Gleyber Torres was named as the roster replacement for Brandon Lowe due to injury.
4. Xander Bogaerts was named as the roster replacement for Hunter Pence due to injury.
5. J. D. Martinez was named starter in place of Hunter Pence due to injury.
6. Max Muncy was named as the roster replacement for Anthony Rendon due to injury.
7. Shane Bieber was named as the roster replacement for Mike Minor due to Minor starting on Sunday.
8. Liam Hendriks was named as the roster replacement for Charlie Morton due to Morton starting on Sunday.
9. Masahiro Tanaka was named as the roster replacement for Marcus Stroman due to injury.
10. Sonny Gray was named as the roster replacement for Max Scherzer due to injury.
11. Felipe Vázquez was named as the roster replacement for Zack Greinke due to Greinke dealing with a personal matter.
12. Brandon Woodruff was named as the roster replacement for Josh Hader due to injury.

#: Indicates player would not play (replaced as per reference notes above).

== Game summary ==
=== Starting lineup ===
National
Order	Player	Team	Position
1	Christian Yelich	Brewers	LF
2	Javier Báez	Cubs	SS
3	Freddie Freeman	Braves	1B
4	Cody Bellinger	Dodgers	RF
5	Nolan Arenado	Rockies	3B
6	Josh Bell	Pirates	DH
7	Willson Contreras	Cubs	C
8	Ketel Marte	Diamondbacks	2B
9	Ronald Acuña Jr.	Braves	CF
	Hyun-jin Ryu	Dodgers	P

American
Order	Player	Team	Position
1	George Springer	Astros	RF
2	DJ LeMahieu	Yankees	2B
3	Mike Trout	Angels	CF
4	Carlos Santana	Indians	1B
5	J. D. Martinez	Red Sox	DH
6	Alex Bregman	Astros	3B
7	Gary Sánchez	Yankees	C
8	Michael Brantley	Astros	LF
9	Jorge Polanco	Twins	SS
	Justin Verlander	Astros	P

=== Line score ===
July 9, 2019 8:15 pm (EDT) Progressive Field in Cleveland, Ohio, 75 °F (24 °C), clear
Team	1	2	3	4	5	6	7	8	9	R	H	E
National League	0	0	0	0	0	1	0	2	0	3	5	0
American League	0	1	0	0	1	0	2	0	X	4	8	0
Starting pitchers: NL: Hyun-jin Ryu; AL: Justin Verlander; WP: Masahiro Tanaka (1–0) LP: Clayton Kershaw (0–1) Sv: Aroldis Chapman (1); Home runs: NL: Charlie Blackmon; AL: Joey Gallo; Attendance: 36,747 Time: 2:48; Umpires: HP – Mark Wegner (crew chief); 1B – Brian O'Nora; 2B – Phil Cuzzi; 3B – Tim Timmons; LF – D. J. Reyburn; RF – Jordan Baker; Replay Official – Fieldin Culbreth; Boxscore

== Logo ==
The Indians and Major League Baseball unveiled the electric guitar inspired logo for the 2019 All-Star Game on August 7, 2018.

== National Anthems ==
The Canadian national anthem was sung by country singer Lindsay Ell. The American national anthem was sung by pop singer MAX.

== See also ==
- List of Major League Baseball All-Star Games
- Major League Baseball All-Star Game Most Valuable Player Award
- All-Star Futures Game
- Home Run Derby
