= Kerry Carpenter =

American baseball player (born 1997)

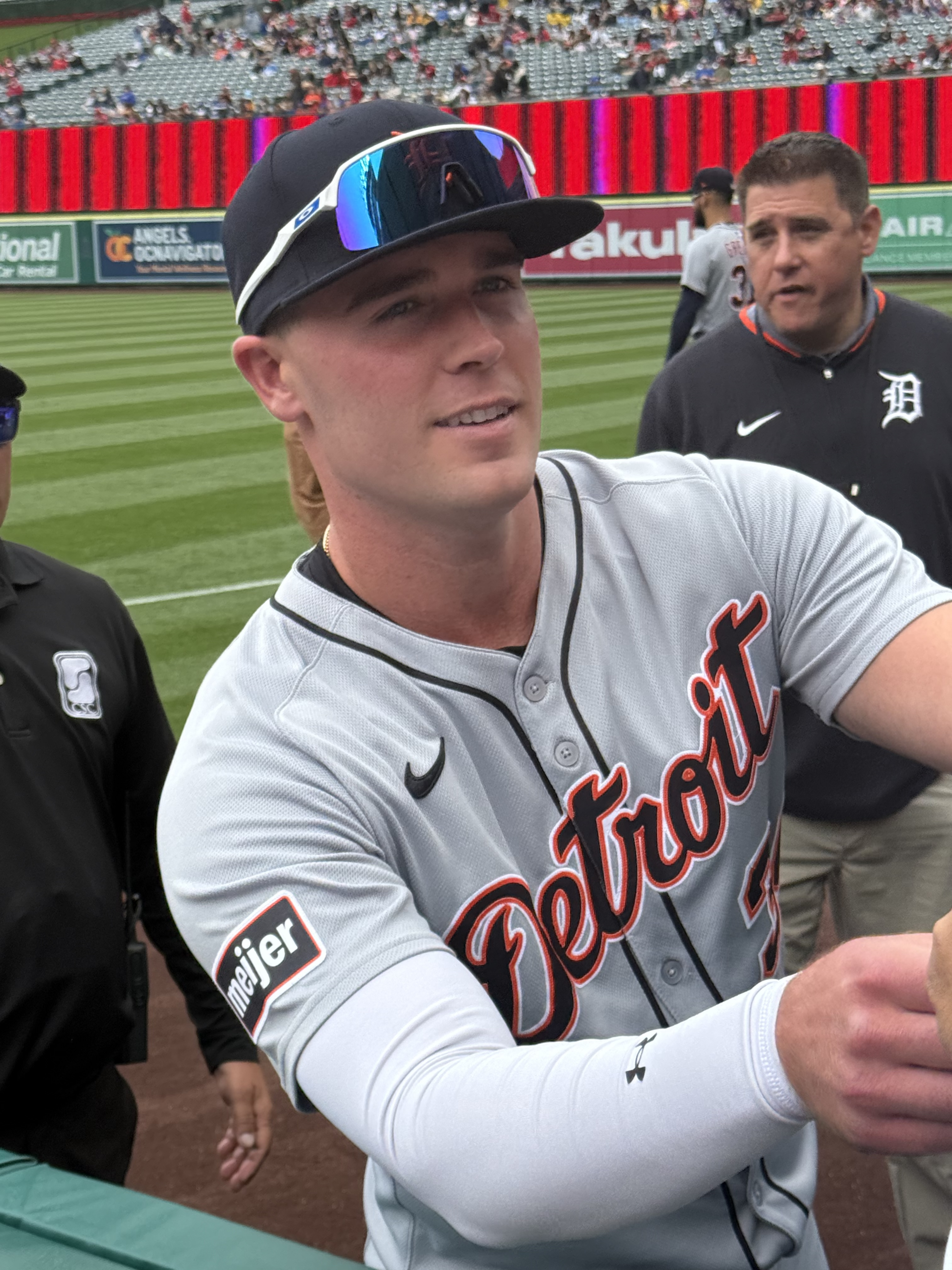
- Carpenter with the Detroit Tigers in 2025

Detroit Tigers – No. 30
- Outfielder
- Born: September 2, 1997 (age 29); Eustis, Florida, U.S.
- Bats: Left Throws: Right

MLB debut
- August 10, 2022, for the Detroit Tigers

MLB statistics (through 2026 season)
- Batting average: .258
- Home runs: 83
- Runs batted in: 229
- Stats at Baseball Reference

Teams
- Detroit Tigers (2022–present)

Kerry William Carpenter (born September 2, 1997) is an American professional baseball outfielder for the Detroit Tigers of Major League Baseball (MLB). He played college baseball at St. Johns River State College and Virginia Tech, and was selected by the Tigers in the 19th round of the 2019 Major League Baseball draft. He made his MLB debut in 2022.

== Amateur career ==
Carpenter attended Eustis High School in Eustis, Florida, where he had .463 batting average with three home runs as a senior in 2016. After graduating, he enrolled at St. Johns River State College where he played two years of college baseball, before transferring to Virginia Tech to play for the Virginia Tech Hokies for the 2019 season. In Carpenter's lone season with Virginia Tech, he started 53 games, and hit .272 with ten home runs and 45 runs batted in (RBI).

== Professional career ==
=== Minor leagues ===
Carpenter was drafted by the Detroit Tigers in the 19th round, with the 562nd overall selection, of the 2019 Major League Baseball draft. He signed with the Tigers and split his first professional season between the Rookie–level Gulf Coast League Tigers and Low–A Connecticut Tigers, batting .303 with nine home runs and 35 RBI over 47 games.

Carpenter did not play in a game in 2020 due to the cancellation of the minor league season because of the COVID-19 pandemic. He spent 2021 with the Double–A Erie SeaWolves and hit .262 with 15 home runs, 74 RBI, and 24 doubles over 112 games. Carpenter returned to Erie to open the 2022 season. He was named Eastern League Player of the Month for May. After batting .304 with 22 home runs and 48 RBI during 63 games with Erie, he was promoted to the Triple–A Toledo Mud Hens in late June. Carpenter played in 35 games for Toledo and batted .331 with eight home runs and 27 RBI over 35 games.

=== Major leagues ===
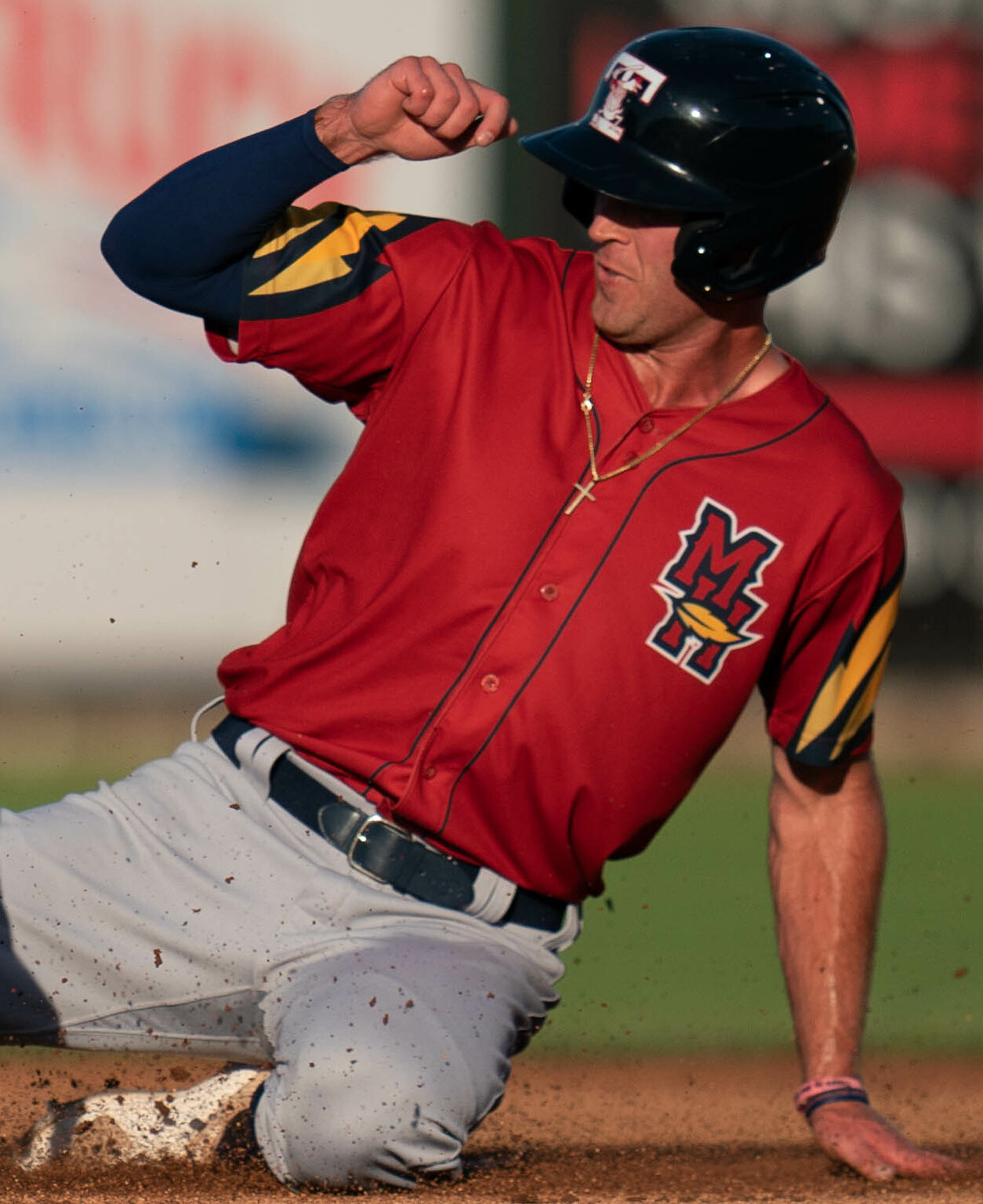
Carpenter with the Mud Hens in 2022

On August 10, 2022, the Tigers selected Carpenter's contract and added him to the Major League roster. He made his MLB debut the same day as Detroit's starting designated hitter, going hitless over four at-bats. He collected his first MLB hit on August 14, a single off Chicago White Sox pitcher Liam Hendriks. He hit his first MLB home run on August 15 off of Eli Morgan of the Cleveland Guardians. Carpenter played in 31 games for the Tigers and hit .252 with six home runs and 10 RBI. He missed the last eight games of the season with a left lumbar spine strain.

Carpenter was named to his first Opening Day roster to begin the 2023 season. He missed over a month during the season due to a right shoulder sprain. Carpenter played in a total of 118 games with the Tigers and hit .278 with 20 home runs and 64 RBI.

Carpenter began the 2024 campaign with Detroit, hitting .283 with eight home runs and 29 RBI across his first 50 games. He was placed on the injured list with lumbar spine inflammation on May 29, 2024. Carpenter was transferred to the 60–day injured list on July 21. He was activated on August 13. In his return, Carpenter hit two home runs against the Seattle Mariners. In the regular season, Carpenter hit .284 with 18 home runs and 57 RBI across 87 games. On October 7, in Game 2 of the 2024 American League Division Series (ALDS) against the Cleveland Guardians, Carpenter hit a three-run home run with two outs in the top of the ninth inning off of Cleveland closer Emmanuel Clase, who had given up only two home runs in 74 1/3 innings, breaking a 0–0 tie and leading to a 3–0 Tigers win. He finished the 2024 postseason batting .306 with four home runs and 10 RBI in eight games, with Detroit's season ending in the ALDS.

In 2025, Carpenter hit two home runs on Opening Day at Comerica Park against the Chicago White Sox. On June 2, he hit three home runs in a 13–1 Tigers victory over the Chicago White Sox. It was the first three-homer game of his career, and the first by a Tiger since Victor Martínez in 2016. Carpenter was placed on the 10-day injured list with a hamstring injury on July 2. He was activated on July 27. In the 2025 regular season, Carpenter hit .252 with 26 home runs and 62 RBI in 130 games. In the 2025 ALDS, Carpenter hit a 2-run homer against the Mariners in Game 1 to put the Tigers in the lead, which proved to be crucial in their 3-2 win in 11 innings. In Game 5, he homered again and reached base six times, tying a postseason record shared with Kenny Lofton and Stan Hack, though the Tigers lost in 15 innings. The record was ultimately broken by Shohei Ohtani during the 2025 World Series.

On January 6, 2026, the Tigers and Carpenter agreed on a one-year, $3.275 million contract, avoiding arbitration. On May 10, he was placed on the injured list with a left shoulder sprain. He was activated on May 31. On July 27, Carpenter was placed back on the injured list with left foot plantar fasciitis, and missed the remainder of the season. Across 81 games with Detroit, he batted .208 with 13 home runs and 36 RBI.

=== Awards and highlights ===
- Eastern League Player of the Month: May 2022
- First three-home-run game by a Tiger since 2016 (June 2, 2025)

== Playing style ==
Reporters have described Carpenter as a left-handed power bat with a compact swing whose adjustments since 2022 improved his results against both right- and left-handed pitching. While primarily a corner outfielder, he has also appeared regularly as a designated hitter.

== Personal life ==
Carpenter is a Christian. He has said, “My goal, basically, is to just be as great as I possibly can be, to reach my full potential. And I personally believe the only way to do that is through Jesus Christ. That’s the foundation. That’s the rock. He’ll guide me and lead me wherever, but that’s kind of the way I think I can honor Him through this sport that I play.”

In December 2023, Carpenter became engaged to Lauren Burke, a former collegiate softball player who played for the Oregon Ducks and Texas Longhorns. They were married on February 3, 2024.
