= Gleyber Torres =

Venezuelan baseball player (born 1996)

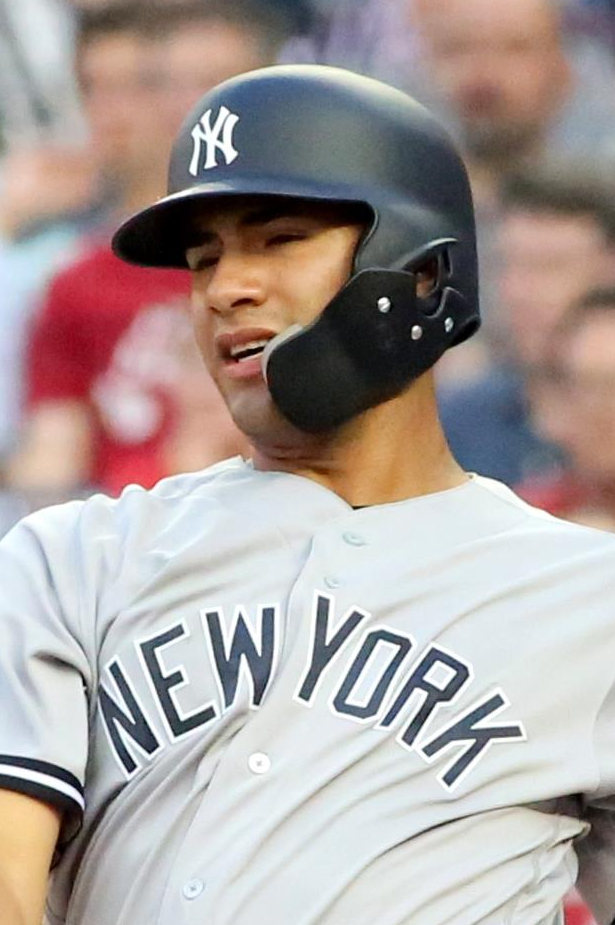
- Torres with the New York Yankees in 2018

Free agent
- Second baseman
- Born: December 13, 1996 (age 29); Caracas, Venezuela
- Bats: Right Throws: Right

MLB debut
- April 22, 2018, for the New York Yankees

MLB statistics (through 2026 season)
- Batting average: .263
- Hits: 1,099
- Home runs: 162
- Runs batted in: 553
- Stats at Baseball Reference

Teams
- New York Yankees (2018–2024); Detroit Tigers (2025–2026)

Career highlights and awards
- 3× All-Star (2018, 2019, 2025)
Medals
Men's baseball
Representing Venezuela
World Baseball Classic
Gold medal – first place	2026 Miami	Team

Gleyber David Torres Castro (born December 13, 1996) is a Venezuelan professional baseball second baseman who is a free agent. He has played in Major League Baseball (MLB) for the New York Yankees and Detroit Tigers. Torres made his MLB debut in 2018 with the Yankees. He has been named an All-Star in 2018, 2019, and 2025.

== Early life ==
Torres was born and raised in Caracas by his parents, Eusebio Torres and Ibelise Castro. Intrigued by the name "Gleyber," his father decided to name Torres after it because of its uniqueness. Torres grew up in a middle-class household. However, life at home devolved into unrest, with many citizens rebelling against the government in the wake of constant food shortages, rampant crime and widespread violence.

Torres started playing baseball at the age of four as a center fielder, catcher, pitcher, and eventually shortstop. His passion for baseball grew watching games on television, while idolizing his favorite player Omar Vizquel. Torres also played basketball briefly in high school, but he quit the sport on his father's instructions in order to focus on baseball.

Academies began to take notice of Torres's talent and wanted to help him become a professional. At 14, Torres moved to Maracay to enroll in an academy that had contacts with MLB scouts.

== Professional career ==
=== Chicago Cubs ===
Torres signed with the Chicago Cubs as an international free agent in 2013 for a $1.7 million signing bonus. He made his professional debut in 2014 with the Arizona Cubs of the Rookie-level Arizona League. He was later promoted to the Boise Hawks of the Low-A Northwest League. In 50 games for the two teams combined, he hit .297/.386/.440 with two home runs.

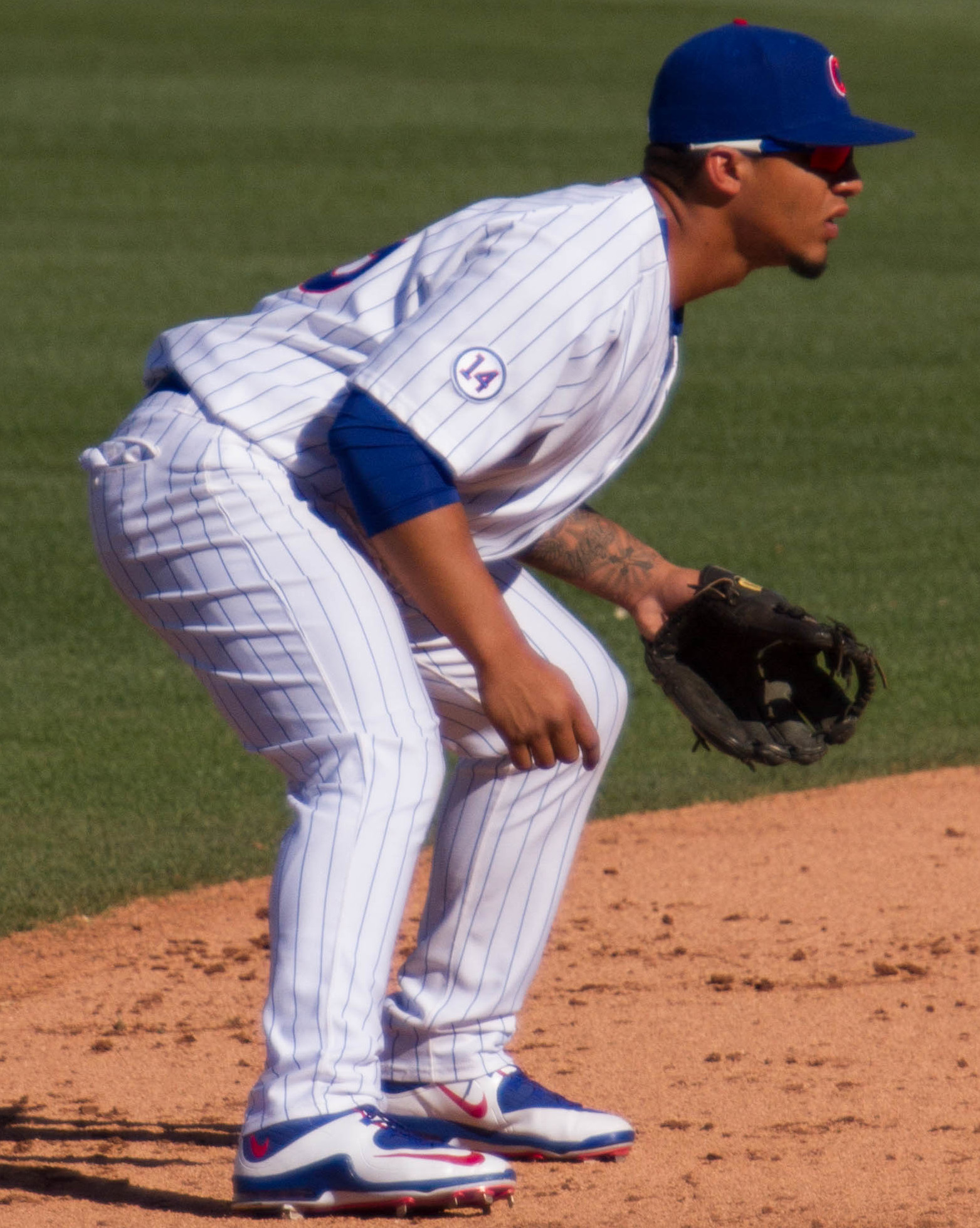
Torres with the Cubs during spring training in 2015

In 2015, Torres began the season with the South Bend Cubs of the Single-A Midwest League, and was promoted to the Myrtle Beach Pelicans of the High-A Carolina League in September. In 487 at bats over 126 games for the two teams combined, he hit .287/.346/.376 with three home runs and 64 runs batted in (RBI).

Torres started the 2016 season with Myrtle Beach.

=== New York Yankees ===
On July 25, 2016, the Cubs traded Torres, Adam Warren, Billy McKinney, and Rashad Crawford to the Yankees for relief pitcher Aroldis Chapman. He began his Yankees career playing with the Tampa Yankees of the High-A Florida State League. He finished the 2016 season batting .270/.354/.421 with 11 home runs and 66 RBI for the two High-A teams combined. After the season, the Yankees assigned him to the Scottsdale Scorpions of the Arizona Fall League (AFL). After batting .403 in 76 at-bats with a .513 on-base percentage and a 1.158 OPS, Torres was named the AFL Most Valuable Player. At the age of 19, Torres was the youngest player in the AFL, and the youngest player in history to win the AFL MVP. He was ranked after the 2016 season as the Yankees' top prospect by Baseball America.

Torres was listed the fifth best prospect in baseball entering the 2017 season by Baseball America. After hitting .448 in 29 at bats with two home runs in spring training with the Yankees, Torres began the 2017 season with the Trenton Thunder of the Double-A Eastern League. In April, he went on the seven-day disabled list with rotator cuff inflammation. The Yankees promoted Torres to the Scranton/Wilkes-Barre RailRiders of the Triple-A International League in May. In June, Torres slid headfirst into home, despite the fact that the Yankees stress to their players to slide feet-first because the team believes it is safer, and tore the ulnar collateral ligament in his non-throwing left elbow. On June 19, Torres was ruled out for the rest of the 2017 season after it was determined that his injury required Tommy John surgery. He finished the 2017 season batting .287/.383/.480 with seven home runs and 34 RBIs for the two teams combined. The Yankees added him to their 40-man roster after the season.

Entering the 2018 season, Torres was labeled the fifth-best prospect in baseball and the best shortstop prospect by MLB.com. During spring training, Torres competed with Miguel Andujar and others for a spot on the opening day roster. On March 13, 2018, Torres was optioned to Scranton/Wilkes-Barre to begin the year. He was pulled out of the game on April 22 after six innings. Torres initially thought it was punishment for not hustling earlier in the game, but was called into manager Bobby Mitchell's office where he was told of his promotion to the Major Leagues.

==== 2018 ====
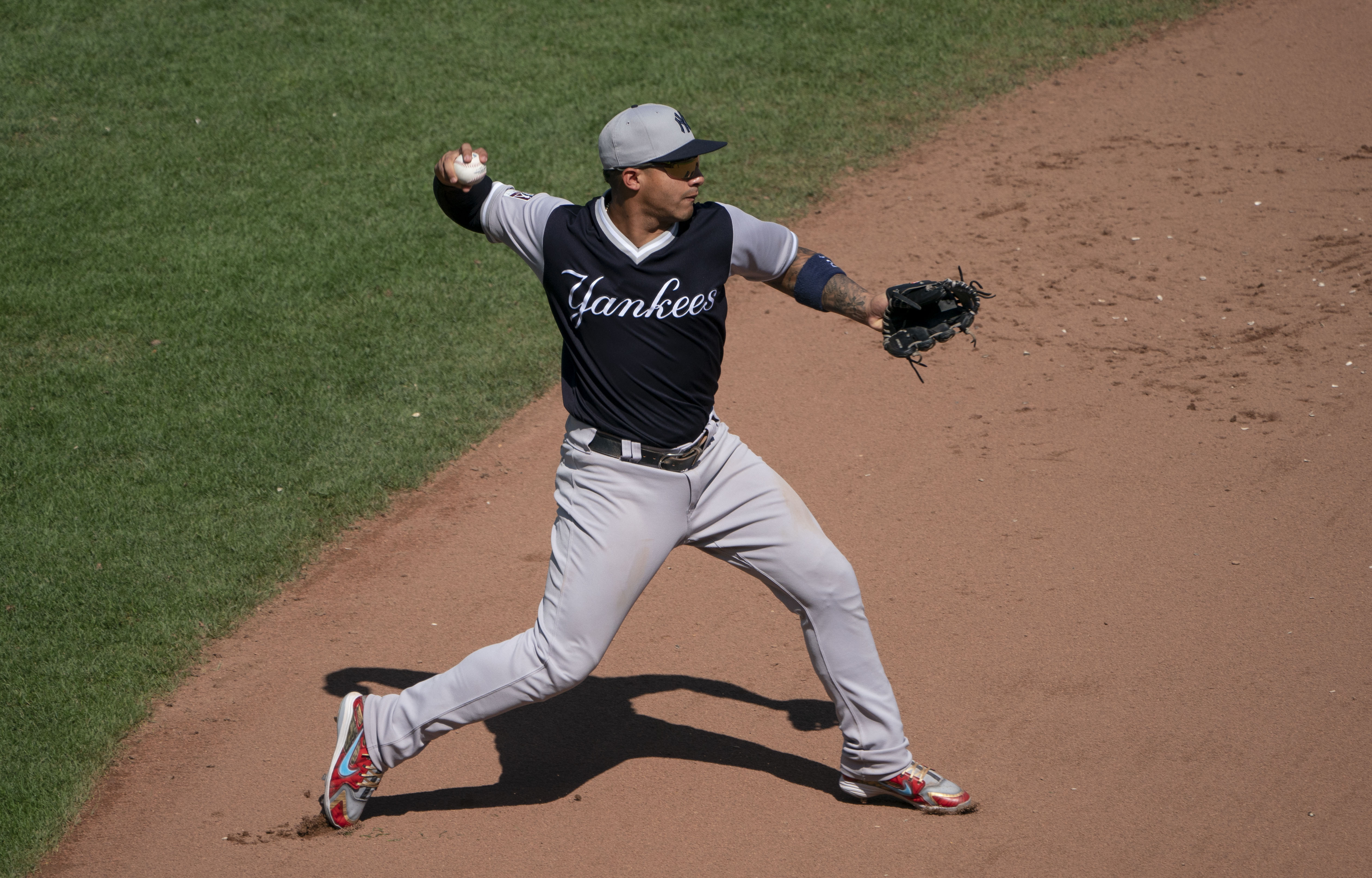
Torres during Players Weekend in 2018

Torres made his MLB debut on April 22, 2018, as the second-baseman against the Toronto Blue Jays, going 0-for-4. The next day, against the Minnesota Twins, Torres recorded his first MLB hit. On May 4, Torres hit his first career home run, off Josh Tomlin, which at the age of 21 was the youngest Yankee to homer since John Ellis in 1969. Two days later, against the Cleveland Indians, Torres hit his first career walk-off, a home run off relief pitcher Dan Otero, becoming the youngest Yankee to hit a walk-off homer and giving the Yankees a 7–4 victory. On May 21, against the Texas Rangers, Torres recorded his first multi-homer game when he hit two home runs as the Yankees won 10–5. On May 25 against the Los Angeles Angels, Torres hit a home run in his fourth straight game; at 21 years and 163 days old, he became the youngest player in American League history to accomplish that feat. Torres was named AL Player of the Week for the week ending on May 27, when he hit .368/.429/1.158 with five home runs and nine RBIs. On May 29, Torres hit a walk-off single to beat the Houston Astros in extra innings. Torres was also named American League Rookie of the Month for May. He slashed of .317/.374/.659 scoring 13 runs, 26 hits, nine home runs and 24 RBIs.

On July 4, Torres went on the 10-day disabled list due to a right hip strain. After batting .294 with 15 home runs and 42 RBIs over 218 at-bats and boasting a .905 OPS, Torres was selected to the 2018 All-Star Game, his first All-Star appearance, but he did not play in the game.

For the week ending on September 2, Torres was once again named AL Player of the week. On September 29, Torres hit the Yankees 265th home run of 2018, surpassing the 1997 Seattle Mariners for most home runs in a single season. In addition, it was the 20th home run in the 9th spot of the order, making the Yankees the first team in history to have 20 home runs from every batting spot in the lineup. Torres finished in third in balloting for the American League Rookie of the Year Award, behind Shohei Ohtani, who won the award, and Andújar.

==== 2019 ====
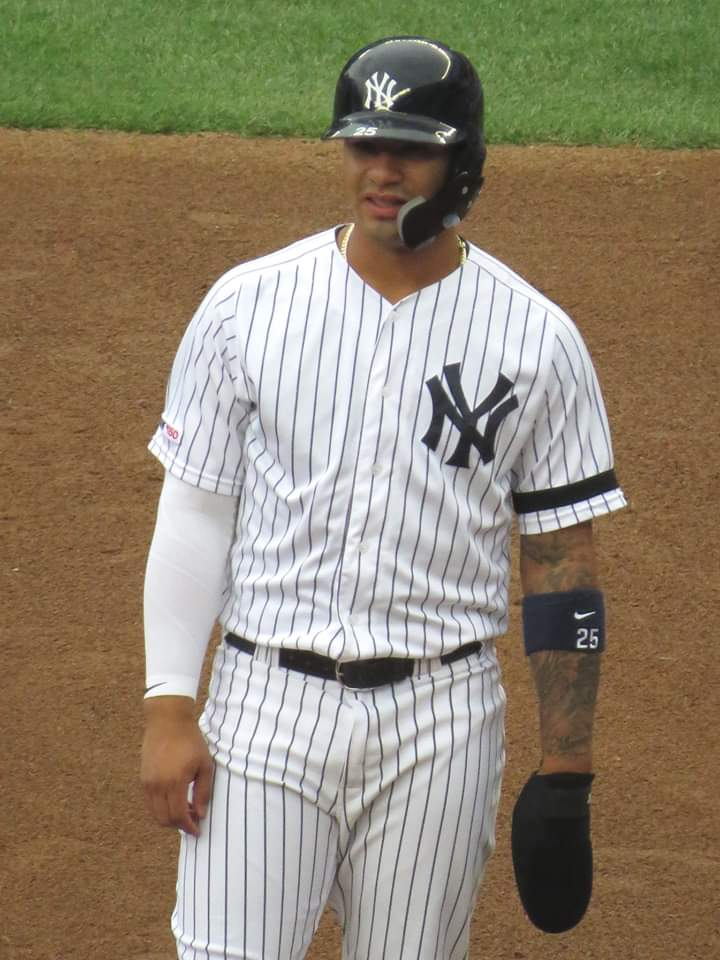
Torres in 2019

Following the 2018 season, Gleyber signed a one-year contract with the Yankees. For his sophomore season, on April 4, 2019, Torres became the fourth youngest Yankee with four hits and three extra base hits in a game since Joe DiMaggio did it in 1936. Torres went 4-for-4 with a double, two home runs and four RBIs against the Baltimore Orioles. On June 19, 2019, Torres hit his 39th career home run and his first career grand slam off Oliver Drake of the Tampa Bay Rays. Torres hit his second career grand slam on August 2, 2019, against Eduardo Rodríguez of the Boston Red Sox. On August 12, the Venezuelan scored his 13th home run against the Orioles, setting a record in the divisional era. On August 22, Torres hit his 30th home run, thus becoming the second Yankee to hit 30 or more home runs in a single season aged 22 or younger, joining Joe DiMaggio who hit 46 home runs in 1937. On July 9, Torres was announced as an American League All-Star for the second time in his career, first time being in 2018. In the All-Star game, Torres notched one hit in two at bats. His 38 home runs made him the second ever middle infielder after Alex Rodriguez to do so before turning 23, and third Yankees player since DiMaggio and Mickey Mantle to hit at least 20 home runs in two different seasons before the age of 23. Torres finished the 2019 regular season batting .278 and went on to hit .417 in the 2019 American League Division Series.

On October 13, 2019, Torres became the youngest second baseman in MLB history, and the third youngest overall (Mickey Mantle, Tony Kubek) to recorded at least four RBIs in a game, and youngest ever for at least five RBIs.

Gleyber ended the 2019 season with 38 home runs and a slugging percentage of .535. He finished 17th in MVP voting in 2019, with his teammate D.J. Lemahieu finishing fourth.

==== 2020 ====
In the pandemic-shortened 2020 season, Torres slashed .243/.356/.368 with three home runs and 16 RBIs in 42 games. On defense, he led all AL shortstops with nine errors.

==== 2021–2022 ====
In 2021, Torres slashed .259/.331/.366 across a total of 459 at bats. He had nine home runs and 51 RBIs as well. After struggling at shortstop, the Yankees moved Torres back to second base in September.

The Yankees acquired Isiah Kiner-Falefa to play shortstop before the 2022 season, keeping Torres at second base.

In 2022, he batted .257/.310/.451 in 526 at bats with 24 home runs and 76 RBIs.

==== 2023 ====
The year began amid rumors about the Yankees trying to trade Torres. The Yankees failed to sign Torres before the arbitration deadline. Torres reportedly sought $10.2 million while the team offered him $9.7 million. However, both agreed to a one-year contract amounting $9.95 million on January 29. On April 3, during a game against the Philadelphia Phillies, Torres hit his 100th career home run, a solo shot to right/center field. He became the 7th youngest Yankee of all-time to do so. For the 2023 season, Torres had a .273 batting average, 25 home runs, 68 RBIs, and 13 stolen bases. He was named a finalist for the Silver Slugger Award.

==== 2024 ====
Torres became a contributor for the Yankees and helped them reach their first World Series since 2009. During Game 1, Torres hit what was initially thought to be a home run in extra innings. It was changed to a ground rule double due to a fan interfering with the baseball. He had a home run in the Yankees Game 4 win, but hit only .143 for the series. After the Yankees lost the World Series to the Los Angeles Dodgers, Torres became a free agent.

=== Detroit Tigers ===
On December 27, 2024, Torres signed a one-year, $15 million contract with the Detroit Tigers. On July 2, 2025, Torres was voted in as the starting AL second baseman for the 2025 All-Star Game. It is his third career All-Star selection, and first as a starter. At the All-Star break, he was hitting .281 with nine home runs and 45 RBI. For the 2025 season, he batted .256 with 16 home runs and 74 RBI. On October 31, Torres underwent sports hernia surgery to repair an injury, which he reportedly spent several months dealing with. On November 18, he accepted the Tigers $22 million qualifying offer to remain with the team for another season.

== Personal life ==
Torres met his long-time girlfriend Elizabeth in his hometown of Caracas in 2014. They were married in April 2017, and had their first child, a son, on March 20, 2022.
