= 2022 Seattle Mariners season =

2022 Seattle Mariners
- American League Wild Card winners
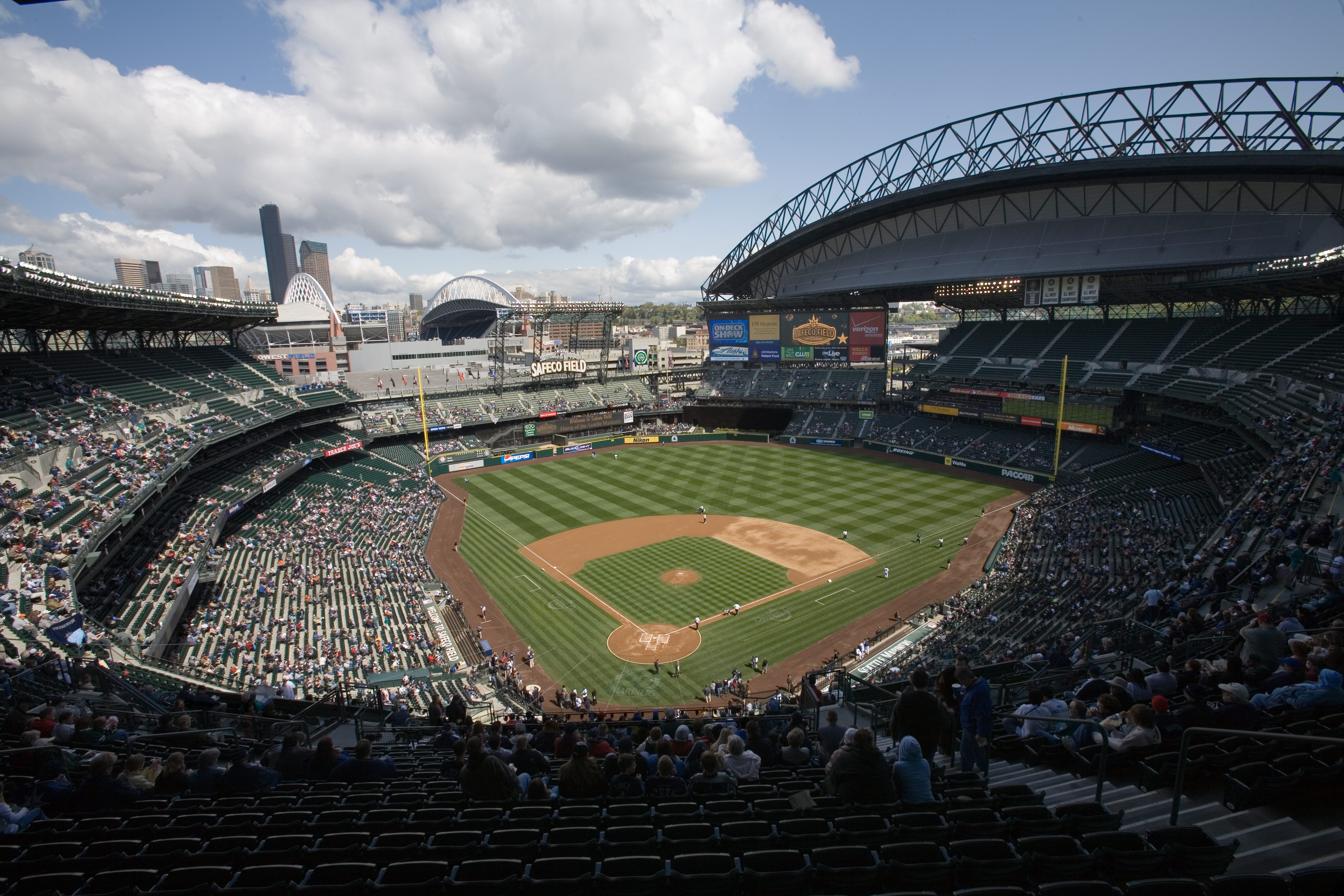
- League: American League
- Division: West
- Ballpark: T-Mobile Park
- City: Seattle, Washington
- Record: 90–72 (.556)
- Divisional place: 2nd
- Owners: Baseball Club of Seattle, LP, represented by CEO John Stanton
- Manager: Scott Servais
- Television: Root Sports Northwest (Dave Sims, Aaron Goldsmith, Mike Blowers)
- Radio: ESPN-710; Seattle Mariners Radio Network (Rick Rizzs, Aaron Goldsmith, Dave Sims)

The 2022 Seattle Mariners season was the 46th season in franchise history. The Mariners played their 23rd full season (24th overall) in Major League Baseball (MLB) at T-Mobile Park, their home ballpark in Seattle, Washington. The Mariners finished the regular season at 90–72, equaling their record from 2021, and successfully reached the postseason for the first time since 2001 as a Wild Card and finishing second in the American League (AL) West.

The season started on April 8 and was adjusted due to the offseason owners' lockout of the players. On July 17, the Mariners became the first team to enter the All-Star break with a 14-game winning streak, their second longest in club history.

On September 30, Cal Raleigh hit a walk-off home run against the Oakland Athletics, clinching the Mariners' first playoff berth since 2001. It ended the longest major professional sports postseason drought in North America. They defeated the Toronto Blue Jays in the American League Wild Card Series but were swept by the eventual champion and division rival Houston Astros in the American League Division Series. The Houston series involved a three-game sweep against the Mariners, complete with an 18-inning loss where they failed to score a single run in their first postseason game played in Seattle since October 18, 2001. The longest postseason drought in major North American sports then belonged to the Sacramento Kings of the National Basketball Association, who had failed to make the playoffs since 2006. However, the Kings clinched a playoff berth the following April, and as a result, the New York Jets of the National Football League now have the longest drought, missing the playoffs for the last 15 seasons. MLB’s longest playoff drought is now owned by the Los Angeles Angels at 11 years.

== Offseason ==
=== Lockout ===
The expiration of the collective bargaining agreement (CBA) between MLB and the MLB Players Association (MLBPA) occurred on December 1, 2021 with no new agreement in place. On December 2, following a unanimous vote by MLB team owners, baseball commissioner Rob Manfred announced a lockout of players, which stopped all player transactions. On March 10, 2022, MLB and the MLBPA agreed to a new collective bargaining agreement, ending the lockout. Opening Day took place on April 8. MLB previously announced several series would be cancelled due to the lockout, but the agreement provided a 162-game season, with originally canceled games made up via doubleheaders.

=== Rule changes ===
Pursuant to the new CBA, several new rules were instituted for the 2022 season. The National League adopted the designated hitter full-time, a draft lottery was implemented, the postseason expanded from 10 teams to 12, and advertising patches would appear on player uniforms and helmets for the first time.

=== Roster changes ===
In November 2021, the Mariners announced their 2022 coaching staff. Bench coach Jared Sandberg and hitting coach Tim Laker did not return to the team. Jarret DeHart was promoted to hitting coach from assistant hitting coach, and Tony Arnerich was named a hitting coach after coaching in the minors for Seattle. The team did not name a bench coach. Kristopher Negrón, who had managed the Triple-A Tacoma Rainiers, became the first base coach. Former first base coach Perry Hill remained the team's infield coach. Andy McKay, who had been the director of player development, was named a major league coach.

Prior to the lockout, the Mariners added reigning AL Cy Young Award winner Robbie Ray on a five-year, $115 million contract on November 30. The team also acquired All-Star infielder Adam Frazier from the San Diego Padres for Ray Kerr and Corey Rosier.

After the lockout, the Mariners acquired third baseman Eugenio Suárez and outfielder Jesse Winker from the Cincinnati Reds for pitchers Justin Dunn and Brandon Williamson, outfielder Jake Fraley, and a player to be named later, weeks later identified as pitcher Connor Phillips.

== Season standings ==
=== American League West ===
AL West
Team	W	L	Pct.	GB	Home	Road
Houston Astros	106	56	.654	—	55‍–‍26	51‍–‍30
Seattle Mariners	90	72	.556	16	46‍–‍35	44‍–‍37
Los Angeles Angels	73	89	.451	33	40‍–‍41	33‍–‍48
Texas Rangers	68	94	.420	38	34‍–‍47	34‍–‍47
Oakland Athletics	60	102	.370	46	29‍–‍51	31‍–‍51

=== American League Wild Card ===
Division leaders
Team	W	L	Pct.
Houston Astros	106	56	.654
New York Yankees	99	63	.611
Cleveland Guardians	92	70	.568

Wild Card teams (Top 3 teams qualify for postseason)
Team	W	L	Pct.	GB
Toronto Blue Jays	92	70	.568	+6
Seattle Mariners	90	72	.556	+4
Tampa Bay Rays	86	76	.531	—
Baltimore Orioles	83	79	.512	3
Chicago White Sox	81	81	.500	5
Minnesota Twins	78	84	.481	8
Boston Red Sox	78	84	.481	8
Los Angeles Angels	73	89	.451	13
Texas Rangers	68	94	.420	18
Detroit Tigers	66	96	.407	20
Kansas City Royals	65	97	.401	21
Oakland Athletics	60	102	.370	26

=== Record against opponents ===
2022 American League record Source: MLB Standings Grid – 2022
Team	BAL	BOS	CWS	CLE	DET	HOU	KC	LAA	MIN	NYY	OAK	SEA	TB	TEX	TOR	NL
Baltimore	—	9–10	5–2	3–3	1–5	4–3	4–3	6–1	3–4	7–12	3–4	2–4	9–10	6–0	9–10	12–8
Boston	10–9	—	2–4	5–2	5–1	4–2	3–4	4–3	3–4	6–13	5–1	6–1	7–12	6–1	3–16	9–11
Chicago	2–5	4–2	—	7–12	12–7	3–4	9–10	3–4	9–10	3–4	5–2	4–2	4–2	3–4	2–4	11–9
Cleveland	3–3	2–5	12–7	—	10–9	3–4	12–7	3–4	13–6	1–5	6–1	1–6	4–2	5–1	5–2	12–8
Detroit	5–1	1–5	7–12	9–10	—	0–7	10–9	3–3	8–11	1–5	2–5	1–6	2–5	4–3	2–5	11–9
Houston	3–4	2–4	4–3	4–3	7–0	—	5–2	13–6	6–0	5–2	12–7	12–7	5–1	14–5	2–4	12–8
Kansas City	3–4	4–3	10–9	7–12	9–10	2–5	—	3–3	7–12	1–6	3–3	2–4	3–4	2–4	2–5	7–13
Los Angeles	1–6	3–4	4–3	4–3	3–3	6–13	3–3	—	4–2	2–4	12–7	10–9	2–5	9–10	3–4	7–13
Minnesota	4–3	4–3	10–9	6–13	11–8	0–6	12–7	2–4	—	2–5	5–1	4–3	4–2	2–5	4–3	8–12
New York	12–7	13–6	4–3	5–1	5–1	2–5	6–1	4–2	5–2	—	5–2	2–4	11–8	4–3	11–8	10–10
Oakland	4–3	1–5	2–5	1–6	5–2	7–12	3–3	7–12	1–5	2–5	—	8–11	3–4	8–11	3–3	5–15
Seattle	4–2	1–6	2–4	6–1	6–1	7–12	4–2	9–10	3–4	4–2	11–8	—	2–5	14–5	5–2	12–8
Tampa Bay	10–9	12–7	2–4	2–4	5–2	1–5	4–3	5–2	2–4	8–11	4–3	5–2	—	4–3	10–9	12–8
Texas	0–6	1–6	4–3	1–5	3–4	5–14	4–2	10–9	5–2	3–4	11–8	5–14	3–4	—	2–4	11–9
Toronto	10–9	16–3	4–2	2–5	5–2	4–2	5–2	4–3	3–4	8–11	3–3	2–5	9–10	4–2	—	13–7

Updated with the results of all games through October 5, 2022.

== Game log ==
=== Regular season ===
2022 game log: 90–72 (Home: 46–35; Away: 44–37)
April: 11–10 (Home: 7–2; Away: 4–8)

#	Date	Opponent	Score	Win	Loss	Save	Attendance	Record	Streak
1	April 8	@ Twins	2–1	**Ray** (1–0)	Ryan (0–1)	**Steckenrider** (1)	35,462	1–0	W1
2	April 9	@ Twins	4–3	**Muñoz** (1–0)	Duffey (0–1)	**D. Castillo** (1)	20,867	2–0	W2
3	April 10	@ Twins	4–10	Ober (1–0)	**Gonzales** (0–1)	—	17,018	2–1	L1
4	April 11	@ Twins	0–4	Bundy (1–0)	**Flexen** (0–1)	—	12,932	2–2	L2
5	April 12	@ White Sox	2–3	López (1–0)	**Brash** (0–1)	Hendriks (1)	36,948	2–3	L3
6	April 13	@ White Sox	4–6	Keuchel (1–0)	**Ray** (1–1)	Hendriks (2)	12,291	2–4	L4
7	April 14	@ White Sox	5–1	**Gilbert** (1–0)	Lambert (0–1)	—	13,391	3–4	W1
8	April 15	Astros	11–1	**Gonzales** (1–1)	Odorizzi (0–1)	—	45,023	4–4	W2
9	April 16	Astros	0–4	Verlander (1–1)	**Flexen** (0–2)	—	38,504	4–5	L1
10	April 17	Astros	7–2	**Brash** (1–1)	Urquidy (1–1)	—	26,583	5–5	W1
11	April 19	Rangers	6–2	**Ray** (2–1)	Gray (0–1)	—	11,067	6–5	W2
12	April 20	Rangers	4–2	**Gilbert** (2–0)	Dunning (0–1)	—	9,374	7–5	W3
13	April 21	Rangers	6–8	Barlow (1–0)	**Steckenrider** (0–1)	—	12,570	7–6	L1
14	April 22	Royals	4–1	**Flexen** (1–2)	Keller (0–2)	**Muñoz** (1)	24,206	8–6	W1
15	April 23	Royals	13–7	**D. Castillo** (1–0)	Brentz (0–3)	–	28,583	9–6	W2
16	April 24	Royals	5–4 (12)	**Ramírez** (1–0)	Payamps (0–1)	–	28,548	10–6	W3
17	April 26	@ Rays	8–4	**Gilbert** (3–0)	Fleming (2–2)	—	9,257	11–6	W4
18	April 27	@ Rays	2–3	Rasmussen (1–1)	**Gonzales** (1–2)	Kittredge (3)	7,290	11–7	L1
19	April 28	@ Rays	1–2	Feyereisen (1–0)	**Flexen** (1–3)	Thompson (2)	6,749	11–8	L2
20	April 29	@ Marlins	6–8	Hernández (2–1)	**Brash** (1–2)	Bender (5)	9,963	11–9	L3
21	April 30	@ Marlins	1–3	Luzardo (2–1)	**Ray** (2–2)	Bender (6)	29,010	11–10	L4

May: 10–18 (Home: 5–8; Away: 5–10)

#	Date	Opponent	Score	Win	Loss	Save	Attendance	Record	Streak
22	May 1	@ Marlins	7–3	**Gilbert** (4–0)	Alcántara (2–1)	–	16,741	12–10	W1
23	May 2	@ Astros	0–3	Odorizzi (2–2)	**Gonzales** (1–3)	Montero (2)	27,321	12–11	L1
24	May 3	@ Astros	0–4	Javier (2–0)	**Flexen** (1–4)	–	23,796	12–12	L2
25	May 4	@ Astros	2–7	Verlander (3–1)	**Brash** (1–3)	–	24,110	12–13	L3
26	May 5	Rays	3–4	McClanahan (2–2)	**Ray** (2–3)	Raley (2)	17,027	12–14	L4
27	May 6	Rays	7–8	Thompson (2–1)	**Sewald** (0–1)	Raley (3)	26,154	12–15	L5
28	May 7	Rays	2–8	Rasmussen (3–1)	**Gonzales** (1–4)	–	31,589	12–16	L6
29	May 8	Rays	2–1 (10)	**Sewald** (1–1)	Wisler (1–1)	–	32,501	13–16	W1
30	May 9	Phillies	0–9	Suárez (3–1)	**Flexen** (1–5)	–	15,881	13–17	L1
31	May 10	Phillies	5–4	**Ray** (3–3)	Nola (1–4)	**Sewald** (1)	16,422	14–17	W1
32	May 11	Phillies	2–4	Domínguez (2–1)	**Gilbert** (4–1)	Knebel (6)	16,387	14–18	L1
33	May 13	@ Mets	2–1	**Sewald** (2–1)	Smith (0–1)	**Steckenrider** (2)	36,629	15–18	W1
34	May 14	@ Mets	4–5	Ottavino (2–1)	**Muñoz** (1–1)	Díaz (8)	37,140	15–19	L1
35	May 15	@ Mets	8–7	**Ray** (4–3)	Shreve (1–1)	**D. Castillo** (2)	38,476	16–19	W1
36	May 16	@ Blue Jays	2–6	Kikuchi (2–1)	**Flexen** (1–6)	Cimber (2)	28,207	16–20	L1
37	May 17	@ Blue Jays	0–3	Berríos (3–2)	**Gilbert** (4–2)	Cimber (3)	22,988	16–21	L2
38	May 18	@ Blue Jays	5–1	**Gonzales** (2–4)	Gausman (3–3)	–	20,472	17–21	W1
39	May 19	@ Red Sox	6–12	Houck (3–3)	**Kirby** (0–1)	–	29,783	17–22	L1
40	May 20	@ Red Sox	3–7	Davis (1–1)	**Ray** (4–4)	–	30,842	17–23	L2
41	May 21	@ Red Sox	5–6	Schreiber (1–0)	**Steckenrider** (0–2)	Barnes (2)	34,832	17–24	L3
42	May 22	@ Red Sox	4–8 (10)	Diekman (1–0)	**Muñoz** (1–2)	–	33,896	17–25	L4
43	May 23	Athletics	7–6	**Gonzales** (3–4)	Logue (2–3)	**Sewald** (2)	14,415	18–25	W1
44	May 24	Athletics	5–7	Moll (2–0)	**Misiewicz** (0–1)	Jiménez (9)	14,797	18–26	L1
45	May 25	Athletics	2–4	Blackburn (5–0)	**Ray** (4–5)	Jiménez (10)	15,856	18–27	L2
46	May 27	Astros	6–1	**Flexen** (2–6)	Verlander (6–2)	–	26,017	19–27	W1
47	May 28	Astros	6–0	**Gilbert** (5–2)	Urquidy (4–2)	–	24,007	20–27	W2
48	May 29	Astros	1–2	Montero (2–0)	**Gonzales** (3–5)	Pressly (8)	28,986	20–28	L1
49	May 31	@ Orioles	10–0	**Kirby** (1–1)	Baker (1–3)	–	8,074	21–28	W1

June: 16–13 (Home: 6–9; Away: 10–4)

#	Date	Opponent	Score	Win	Loss	Save	Attendance	Record	Streak
50	June 1	@ Orioles	2–9	Pérez (4–0)	**Ray** (4–6)	–	8,400	21–29	L1
51	June 2	@ Orioles	7–6 (10)	**D. Castillo** (2–0)	López (3–3)	–	8,817	22–29	W1
52	June 3	@ Rangers	4–3	**Murfee** (1–0)	Barlow (1–1)	**Sewald** (3)	25,378	23–29	W2
53	June 4	@ Rangers	2–3	Otto (4–2)	**Gonzales** (3–6)	Barlow (10)	28,794	23–30	L1
54	June 5	@ Rangers	6–5 (10)	**D. Castillo** (3–0)	Burke (3–1)	**Sewald** (4)	27,427	24–30	W1
55	June 6	@ Astros	7–4	**Ray** (5–6)	Javier (3–3)	**D. Castillo** (3)	27,521	25–30	W2
56	June 7	@ Astros	1–4	Verlander (7–2)	**Flexen** (2–7)	Pressly (11)	30,583	25–31	L1
57	June 8	@ Astros	6–3	**Gilbert** (6–2)	Urquidy (5–3)	**D. Castillo** (4)	23,752	26–31	W1
58	June 10	Red Sox	3–4	Diekman (2–0)	**Muñoz** (1–3)	Houck (1)	27,314	26–32	L1
59	June 11	Red Sox	7–6	**Sewald** (3–1)	Robles (1–2)	–	37,691	27–32	W1
60	June 12	Red Sox	0–2	Danish (2–0)	**Sewald** (3–2)	Houck (2)	42,900	27–33	L1
61	June 13	Twins	2–3	Thielbar (2–0)	**Flexen** (2–8)	Pagán (9)	12,749	27–34	L2
62	June 14	Twins	5–0	**Gilbert** (7–2)	Ryan (5–3)	–	13,019	28–34	W1
63	June 15	Twins	0–5	Jax (4–0)	**Gonzales** (3–7)	–	15,329	28–35	L1
64	June 16	Angels	1–4	Ohtani (5–4)	**Kirby** (1–2)	Iglesias (13)	21,485	28–36	L2
65	June 17	Angels	8–1	**Ray** (6–6)	Lorenzen (6–4)	–	37,500	29–36	W1
66	June 18 (1)	Angels	2–4 (10)	Iglesias (2–4)	**D. Castillo** (3–1)	Quijada (1)	24,071	29–37	L1
67	June 18 (2)	Angels	0–3	Herget (2–1)	**Milone** (0–1)	Bradley (2)	20,804	29–38	L2
68	June 19	Angels	0–4	Wantz (1–0)	**Gilbert** (7–3)	–	39,052	29–39	L3
69	June 21	@ Athletics	8–2	**Gonzales** (4–7)	Kaprielian (0–5)	–	4,733	30–39	W1
70	June 22	@ Athletics	9–0	**Kirby** (2–2)	Blackburn (6–3)	–	5,414	31–39	W2
71	June 23	@ Athletics	2–1	**D. Castillo** (4–1)	Jackson (1–2)	**Sewald** (5)	8,215	32–39	W3
72	June 24	@ Angels	4–3	**Flexen** (3–8)	Lorenzen (6–5)	**Sewald** (6)	35,704	33–39	W4
73	June 25	@ Angels	5–3	**Gilbert** (8–3)	Bradley (0–1)	**Swanson** (1)	35,466	34–39	W5
74	June 26	@ Angels	1–2	Suárez (1–2)	**Gonzales** (4–8)	Ortega (1)	26,489	34–40	L1
75	June 27	Orioles	2–9	Wells (6–4)	**Kirby** (2–3)	Akin (1)	21,615	34–41	L2
76	June 28	Orioles	2–0	**D. Castillo** (5–1)	Pérez (4–1)	**Sewald** (7)	16,024	35–41	W1
77	June 29	Orioles	9–3	**Flexen** (4–8)	Voth (0–1)	–	17,412	36–41	W2
78	June 30	Athletics	8–6	**Gilbert** (9–3)	Martínez (1–1)	**Sewald** (8)	20,860	37–41	W3

July: 18–7 (Home: 9–4; Away: 9–3)

#	Date	Opponent	Score	Win	Loss	Save	Attendance	Record	Streak
79	July 1	Athletics	1–3	Kaprielian (1–5)	**Gonzales** (4–9)	Trivino (5)	27,589	37–42	L1
80	July 2	Athletics	2–1	**D. Castillo** (6–1)	Trivino (1–6)	–	23,907	38–42	W1
81	July 3	Athletics	2–1	**Ray** (7–6)	Montas (3–9)	**Sewald** (9)	23,333	39–42	W2
82	July 4	@ Padres	8–2	**Flexen** (5–8)	Manaea (3–4)	–	37,913	40–42	W3
83	July 5	@ Padres	6–2	**Gilbert** (10–3)	Clevinger (2–1)	–	29,745	41–42	W4
84	July 7	Blue Jays	8–3	**Gonzales** (5–9)	Banda (1–1)	–	24,998	42–42	W5
85	July 8	Blue Jays	5–2 (11)	**Borucki** (1–0)	Romo (0–1)	–	32,398	43–42	W6
86	July 9	Blue Jays	2–1	**Brash** (2–3)	Manoah (9–4)	**D. Castillo** (5)	41,210	44–42	W7
87	July 10	Blue Jays	6–5	**Festa** (1–0)	Cimber (8–3)	**Sewald** (10)	37,694	45–42	W8
—	July 12	@ Nationals	Postponed (rain); Makeup July 13						
88	July 13 (1)	@ Nationals	6–4	**Flexen** (6–8)	Gray (7–6)	**Sewald** (11)	16,260	46–42	W9
89	July 13 (2)	@ Nationals	2–1	**Milone** (1–1)	Fedde (5–7)	**Sewald** (12)	19,869	47–42	W10
90	July 14	@ Rangers	6–5	**Festa** (2–0)	Santana (3–5)	**D. Castillo** (6)	19,243	48–42	W11
91	July 15	@ Rangers	8–3	**Ray** (8–6)	Hearn (4–6)	–	26,494	49–42	W12
92	July 16	@ Rangers	3–2 (10)	**D. Castillo** (7–1)	Martin (0–5)	**Festa** (1)	35,761	50–42	W13
93	July 17	@ Rangers	6–2	**Borucki** (2–0)	Otto (4–6)	–	26,378	51–42	W14
–	July 19	**92nd All-Star Game in Los Angeles, CA**							
94	July 22	Astros	2–5	Urquidy (9–4)	**Gonzales** (5–10)	Neris (1)	45,290	51–43	L1
95	July 23	Astros	1–3	Verlander (13–3)	**Gilbert** (10–4)	Abreu (1)	43,197	51–44	L2
96	July 24	Astros	5–8	Valdez (9–4)	**Ray** (8–7)	Pressly (20)	34,827	51–45	L3
97	July 25	Rangers	4–3	**Flexen** (7–8)	Otto (4–7)	**Swanson** (2)	23,581	52–45	W1
98	July 26	Rangers	5–4	**Swanson** (1–0)	Martin (0–6)	–	25,837	53–45	W2
99	July 27	Rangers	4–2	**Gonzales** (6–10)	Gray (7–5)	**Festa** (2)	25,509	54–45	W3
100	July 28	@ Astros	2–4	Montero (4–1)	**Muñoz** (1–4)	Pressly (21)	29,799	54–46	L1
101	July 29	@ Astros	1–11	Verlander (14–3)	**Ray** (8–8)	–	38,497	54–47	L2
102	July 30	@ Astros	5–4	**Swanson** (2–0)	Pressly (3–3)	**Sewald** (13)	37,385	55–47	W1
103	July 31	@ Astros	2–3 (10)	Neris (4–3)	**Bernardino** (0–1)	–	35,773	55–48	L1

August: 17–10 (Home: 8–5; Away: 9–5)

#	Date	Opponent	Score	Win	Loss	Save	Attendance	Record	Streak
104	August 1	@ Yankees	2–7	Germán (1–1)	**Gonzales** (6–11)	–	36,731	55–49	L2
105	August 2	@ Yankees	8–6	**Murfee** (2–0)	Luetge (3–4)	**Muñoz** (2)	38,735	56–49	W1
106	August 3	@ Yankees	7–3	**L. Castillo** (5–4)	Cole (9–4)	–	42,169	57–49	W2
107	August 5	Angels	3–4 (10)	Chavez (2–1)	**Sewald** (3–3)	Herget (2)	42,654	57–50	L1
108	August 6 (1)	Angels	2–1	**Kirby** (3–3)	Barría (1–2)	**Swanson** (3)	41,507	58–50	W1
109	August 6 (2)	Angels	1–7	Detmers (4–3)	**Flexen** (7–9)	–	27,065	58–51	L1
110	August 7	Angels	6–3	**Gonzales** (7–11)	Davidson (1–3)	**Sewald** (14)	34,837	59–51	W1
111	August 8	Yankees	4–9	Taillon (11–2)	**Gilbert** (10–5)	–	35,843	59–52	L1
112	August 9	Yankees	1–0 (13)	**Brash** (3–3)	Loáisiga (1–3)	–	38,804	60–52	W1
113	August 10	Yankees	4–3	**Murfee** (3–0)	Abreu (2–2)	**Sewald** (15)	43,280	61–52	W2
114	August 12	@ Rangers	6–2	**Kirby** (4–3)	Hearn (5–7)	–	22,622	62–52	W3
115	August 13	@ Rangers	4–7	Martin (1–7)	**Gonzales** (7–12)	Hernández (3)	31,621	62–53	L1
116	August 14	@ Rangers	3–5	Sborz (1–0)	**Brash** (3–4)	Leclerc (1)	25,560	62–54	L2
117	August 15	@ Angels	6–2	**Muñoz** (2–4)	Loup (0–4)	–	23,096	63–54	W1
118	August 16	@ Angels	8–2	**Ray** (9–8)	Suárez (4–5)	–	20,294	64–54	W2
119	August 17	@ Angels	11–7	**Kirby** (5–3)	Toussaint (1–1)	–	19,550	65–54	W3
120	August 19	@ Athletics	10–2	**Gonzales** (8–12)	Irvin (6–11)	–	16,912	66–54	W4
121	August 20	@ Athletics	3–4 (10)	Jiménez (3–4)	**D. Castillo** (7–2)	–	9,626	66–55	L1
122	August 21	@ Athletics	3–5	Sears (5–0)	**L. Castillo** (5–5)	Pruitt (1)	9,314	66–56	L2
123	August 23	Nationals	4–2	**Ray** (10–8)	Fedde (5–8)	**Sewald** (16)	38,254	67–56	W1
124	August 24	Nationals	1–3	Finnegan (5–2)	**Sewald** (3–4)	–	21,035	67–57	L1
125	August 25	Guardians	3–1	**Gonzales** (9–12)	McKenzie (9–10)	**Muñoz** (3)	24,028	68–57	W1
126	August 26	Guardians	3–2 (11)	**Murfee** (4–0)	Clase (2–3)	–	39,870	69–57	W2
127	August 27	Guardians	3–4	Plesac (3–11)	**Muñoz** (2–5)	Clase (30)	45,586	69–58	L1
128	August 28	Guardians	4–0	**Ray** (11–8)	Civale (2–6)	–	45,190	70–58	W1
129	August 30	@ Tigers	9–3	**Kirby** (6–3)	Manning (1–2)	**Flexen** (1)	12,536	71–58	W2
130	August 31	@ Tigers	5–3	**Gonzales** (10–12)	Lange (4–4)	**Sewald** (17)	13,666	72–58	W3

September: 14–12 (Home: 7–5; Away: 7–7)

#	Date	Opponent	Score	Win	Loss	Save	Attendance	Record	Streak
131	September 1	@ Tigers	7–0	**Gilbert** (11–5)	Rodríguez (3–4)	–	14,393	73–58	W4
132	September 2	@ Guardians	6–1	**L. Castillo** (6–5)	Morris (0–1)	–	21,923	74–58	W5
133	September 3	@ Guardians	4–0	**Ray** (12–8)	Curry (0–1)	–	26,254	75–58	W6
134	September 4	@ Guardians	6–3 (11)	**Boyd** (1–0)	Stephan (4–4)	**Flexen** (2)	17,809	76–58	W7
135	September 5	White Sox	2–3	Lynn (5–5)	**Gonzales** (10–13)	Hendriks (30)	37,109	76–59	L1
136	September 6	White Sox	3–0	**Gilbert** (12–5)	Cueto (7–7)	**Sewald** (18)	17,958	77–59	W1
137	September 7	White Sox	6–9	Bummer (1–1)	**D. Castillo** (7–3)	Hendriks (31)	15,264	77–60	L1
138	September 9	Braves	4–6	Morton (8–5)	**Ray** (12–9)	Jansen (33)	42,114	77–61	L2
139	September 10	Braves	3–1	**Kirby** (7–3)	Fried (13–6)	**Sewald** (19)	44,965	78–61	W1
140	September 11	Braves	8–7	**Sewald** (4–4)	Jansen (5–2)	–	45,245	79–61	W2
141	September 13	Padres	0–2	Darvish (14–7)	**Gilbert** (12–6)	Hader (32)	34,740	79–62	L1
142	September 14	Padres	6–1	**L. Castillo** (7–5)	Clevinger (5–7)	–	24,238	80–62	W1
143	September 16	@ Angels	7–8	Lorenzen (7–6)	**Ray** (12–10)	Tepera (3)	37,480	80–63	L1
144	September 17	@ Angels	1–2	Ohtani (13–8)	**Kirby** (7–4)	Loup (1)	35,538	80–64	L2
145	September 18	@ Angels	1–5	Detmers (6–5)	**Gonzales** (10–14)	–	24,929	80–65	L3
146	September 19	@ Angels	9–1	**Gilbert** (13–5)	Suárez (6–8)	–	15,594	81–65	W1
147	September 20	@ Athletics	1–4	Sears (6–2)	**L. Castillo** (7–6)	Acevedo (3)	4,251	81–66	L1
148	September 21	@ Athletics	1–2	Kaprielian (4–9)	**Swanson** (2–1)	Acevedo (4)	4,030	81–67	L2
149	September 22	@ Athletics	9–5	**Boyd** (2–0)	Snead (1–1)	–	4,696	82–67	W1
150	September 23	@ Royals	1–5	Singer (10–4)	**Gonzales** (10–15)	–	13,615	82–68	L1
151	September 24	@ Royals	6–5	**Sewald** (5–4)	Keller (6–14)	**Muñoz** (4)	25,237	83–68	W1
152	September 25	@ Royals	12–13	Cuas (4–2)	**Brash** (3–5)	Barlow (24)	18,350	83–69	L1
153	September 27	Rangers	0–5	Miller (1–1)	**Ray** (12–11)	–	23,221	83–70	L2
154	September 28	Rangers	3–1	**Kirby** (8–4)	Pérez (12–7)	**Sewald** (20)	21,863	84–70	W1
155	September 29	Rangers	10–9 (11)	**Flexen** (8–9)	King (1–4)	–	21,094	85–70	W2
156	September 30	Athletics	2–1	**Brash** (4–4)	Acevedo (3–4)	–	44,754	86–70	W3

October: 4–2 (Home: 4–2; Away: 0–0)

#	Date	Opponent	Score	Win	Loss	Save	Attendance	Record	Streak
157	October 1	Athletics	5–1	**L. Castillo** (8–6)	Oller (2–8)	–	42,512	87–70	W4
158	October 2	Athletics	3–10	Kaprielian (5–9)	**Ray** (12–12)	–	42,465	87–71	L1
159	October 3	Tigers	3–4	Garcia (2–0)	**Kirby** (8–5)	Chafin (3)	23,463	87–72	L2
160	October 4 (1)	Tigers	7–6 (10)	**Torrens** (1–0)	Soto (2–10)	–	see 2nd game	88–72	W1
161	October 4 (2)	Tigers	9–6	**Sheffield** (1–0)	Rodríguez (0–4)	**D. Castillo** (7)	24,564	89–72	W2
162	October 5	Tigers	5–4	**Swanson** (3–2)	Soto (2–11)	–	22,053	90–72	W3

Legend: = Win = Loss = Postponement
**Bold** = Mariners team member

== Postseason ==
=== Game log ===
2022 Postseason game log: 2–3 (Home: 0–1; Away: 2–2)
AL Wild Card Series: 2–0 (Home: 0–0; Away: 2–0)

#	Date	Opponent	Score	Win	Loss	Save	Attendance	Record
1	October 7	@ Blue Jays	4–0	**L. Castillo** (1–0)	Manoah (0–1)	–	47,402	1–0
2	October 8	@ Blue Jays	10–9	**Muñoz** (1–0)	Romano (0–1)	**Kirby** (1)	47,156	2–0

AL Division Series: 0–3 (Home: 0–1; Away: 0–2)

#	Date	Opponent	Score	Win	Loss	Save	Attendance	Record
1	October 11	@ Astros	7–8	Montero (1–0)	**Ray** (0–1)	–	41,125	0–1
2	October 13	@ Astros	2–4	Neris (1–0)	**L. Castillo** (1–1)	Pressly (1)	41,774	0–2
3	October 15	Astros	0–1 (18)	García (1–0)	**Murfee** (0–1)	–	47,690	0–3

Legend: = Win = Loss = Postponement
**Bold** = Mariners team member

=== Postseason rosters ===
Playoff rosters
American League Wild Card Series

- Pitchers: 21 Luis Castillo 36 Logan Gilbert 37 Paul Sewald 38 Robbie Ray 47 Matt Brash 48 Matthew Boyd 50 Erik Swanson 56 Penn Murfee 63 Diego Castillo 67 Matthew Festa 68 George Kirby 75 Andrés Muñoz
- Catchers: 5 Curt Casali 22 Luis Torrens 29 Cal Raleigh
- Infielders: 3 J. P. Crawford 13 Abraham Toro 23 Ty France 25 Dylan Moore 26 Adam Frazier 28 Eugenio Suárez 41 Carlos Santana
- Outfielders: 10 Jarred Kelenic 17 Mitch Haniger 20 Taylor Trammell 44 Julio Rodríguez

American League Division Series

- Pitchers: 21 Luis Castillo 36 Logan Gilbert 37 Paul Sewald 38 Robbie Ray 47 Matt Brash 48 Matthew Boyd 50 Erik Swanson 56 Penn Murfee 63 Diego Castillo 67 Matthew Festa 68 George Kirby 75 Andrés Muñoz
- Catchers: 5 Curt Casali 22 Luis Torrens 29 Cal Raleigh
- Infielders: 3 J. P. Crawford 13 Abraham Toro 23 Ty France 25 Dylan Moore 26 Adam Frazier 28 Eugenio Suárez 41 Carlos Santana
- Outfielders: 10 Jarred Kelenic 17 Mitch Haniger 20 Taylor Trammell 44 Julio Rodríguez

== Roster ==
2022 Seattle Mariners
Roster
Pitchers: 70 Brennan Bernardino; 30 Ryan Borucki; 48 Matthew Boyd; 47 Matt Brash; 63 Diego Castillo; 21 Luis Castillo; 53,55 Roenis Elías; 67 Matthew Festa; 77 Chris Flexen; 36 Logan Gilbert; 58 Ken Giles; 7 Marco Gonzales; 68 George Kirby; 41 Matt Koch; 40 Wyatt Mills; 53 Tommy Milone; 18 Anthony Misiewicz; 75 Andrés Muñoz; 56 Penn Murfee; 61 Riley O'Brien; 55 Yohan Ramírez; 38 Robbie Ray; 54 Sergio Romo; 37 Paul Sewald; 33 Justus Sheffield; 16 Drew Steckenrider; 50 Erik Swanson; 81 Danny Young	Catchers: 5 Curt Casali; 40 Andrew Knapp; 2 Tom Murphy; 64 Brian O'Keefe; 29 Cal Raleigh; 22 Luis Torrens; Infielders: 3 J. P. Crawford; 31 Drew Ellis; 70 Mike Ford; 23 Ty France; 21,26 Adam Frazier; 25 Dylan Moore; 35 Kevin Padlo; 41 Carlos Santana; 28 Eugenio Suárez; 13 Abraham Toro; 8 Donnie Walton	Outfielders: 30 Stuart Fairchild; 0 Sam Haggerty; 17 Mitch Haniger; 8 Travis Jankowski; 10 Jarred Kelenic; 18 Jake Lamb; 74 Jack Larsen; 1 Kyle Lewis; 44 Julio Rodríguez; 21 Steven Souza Jr.; 20 Taylor Trammell; 8 Justin Upton; 60 Marcus Wilson; 27 Jesse Winker	Manager: 9 Scott Servais; Coaches: 14 Manny Acta (third base); 57 Tony Arnerich (hitting); 66 Fleming Baez (bullpen catcher); 79 Trent Blank (bullpen); 89 Nasusel Cabrera (batting practice pitcher); 44 Jarret DeHart (assistant hitting); 6 Perry Hill (infield); 49 Andy McKay (senior director baseball development); 57 Kristopher Negrón (first base); 39 Carson Vitale (field coordinator); 32 Pete Woodworth (pitching)

== Statistics ==
Updated through October 5

=== Batting ===
List does not include pitchers. Stats in bold are the team leaders.

Note: G = Games played; AB = At bats; R = Runs; H = Hits; 2B = Doubles; 3B = Triples; HR = Home runs; RBI = Runs batted in; BB = Walks; SO = Strikeouts; SB = Stolen bases; Avg. = Batting average; OBP = On-base percentage; SLG = Slugging percentage; OPS = On Base + Slugging

Player	G	AB	R	H	2B	3B	HR	RBI	BB	SO	SB	AVG	OBP	SLG	OPS
Ty France	140	**551**	65	**152**	**27**	1	20	84	35	94	0	.276	.340	.437	.777
Eugenio Suárez	150	543	76	128	24	2	**31**	**87**	73	**196**	0	.236	.332	.459	.791
Adam Frazier	**156**	541	61	129	22	**4**	3	42	46	73	11	.238	.301	.311	.612
J. P. Crawford	145	518	57	126	24	3	6	42	68	80	3	.243	.339	.336	.675
Julio Rodríguez	132	511	**84**	145	25	3	28	75	40	145	**25**	**.284**	**.345**	**.509**	**.853**
Jesse Winker	136	456	51	100	15	0	14	53	**84**	103	0	.219	.344	.344	.688
Cal Raleigh	119	370	46	78	20	1	27	63	38	122	1	.211	.284	.489	.774
Abraham Toro	109	324	36	60	13	1	10	35	22	65	2	.185	.239	.324	.563
Carlos Santana	79	255	35	49	8	0	15	39	35	60	0	.192	.293	.400	.693
Mitch Haniger	57	224	31	55	8	0	11	34	20	65	0	.246	.308	.429	.736
Dylan Moore	104	205	41	46	11	2	6	24	34	75	21	.224	.368	.385	.753
Sam Haggerty	83	176	29	45	9	1	5	23	18	53	13	.256	.335	.403	.738
Jarred Kelenic	54	163	20	23	5	1	7	17	16	61	5	.141	.221	.313	.534
Luis Torrens	55	151	13	34	2	0	3	15	12	50	0	.225	.283	.298	.581
Taylor Trammell	43	102	15	20	9	0	4	10	13	33	2	.196	.284	.402	.686
Kyle Lewis	18	56	6	8	0	0	3	5	5	19	0	.143	.226	.304	.530
Justin Upton	17	48	2	6	1	0	1	3	6	23	0	.125	.263	.208	.471
Curt Casali	16	40	7	5	1	0	1	3	9	14	0	.125	.300	.225	.525
Tom Murphy	14	33	9	10	2	0	1	1	8	13	0	.303	.439	.455	.894
Jake Lamb	16	30	3	5	1	0	1	2	3	14	0	.167	.265	.300	.565
Mike Ford	16	29	1	5	1	0	0	3	8	12	0	.172	.368	.207	.575
Steven Souza Jr.	6	19	0	3	0	0	0	1	0	8	0	.158	.158	.158	.316
Kevin Padlo	6	10	0	2	1	0	0	3	1	5	0	.200	.273	.300	.573
Marcus Wilson	3	5	1	1	0	0	0	0	1	4	0	.200	.333	.200	.533
Andrew Knapp	2	4	0	0	0	0	0	0	0	3	0	.000	.000	.000	.000
Brian O'Keefe	2	3	0	1	0	0	0	0	1	2	0	.333	.500	.333	.833
Drew Ellis	1	3	0	1	0	0	0	0	0	1	0	.333	.333	.333	.666
Stuart Fairchild	3	3	0	0	0	0	0	0	0	2	0	.000	.000	.000	.000
Travis Jankowski	1	1	0	0	0	0	0	0	0	1	0	.000	.000	.000	.000
Jack Larsen	1	1	0	0	0	0	0	0	0	1	0	.000	.000	.000	.000
Donovan Walton	1	0	1	0	0	0	0	0	0	0	0	–––	–––	–––	–––
**Team totals**	**162**	**5375**	**690**	**1236**	**229**	**19**	**197**	**663**	**596**	**1397**	**83**	**.230**	**.315**	**.390**	**.704**

=== Pitching ===
List does not include position players. Stats in bold are the team leaders.

Note: W = Wins; L = Losses; ERA = Earned run average; G = Games pitched; GS = Games started; SV = Saves; IP = Innings pitched; H = Hits allowed; R = Runs allowed; ER = Earned runs allowed; BB = Walks allowed; K = Strikeouts

Player	W	L	ERA	G	GS	SV	IP	H	R	ER	BB	K
Robbie Ray	12	12	3.71	32	**32**	0	**189.0**	163	80	78	**62**	**212**
Logan Gilbert	**13**	6	**3.20**	32	**32**	0	185.2	170	71	66	49	174
Marco Gonzales	10	**15**	4.13	32	**32**	0	183.0	**194**	**97**	**84**	50	103
Chris Flexen	8	9	3.73	33	22	2	137.2	132	61	57	51	95
George Kirby	8	5	3.39	25	25	0	130.0	135	54	49	22	133
Penn Murfee	4	0	2.99	64	1	0	69.1	48	23	23	18	76
Luis Castillo	4	2	3.17	11	11	0	65.1	55	26	23	17	77
Andrés Muñoz	2	5	2.49	64	0	4	65.0	43	20	18	15	96
Paul Sewald	5	4	2.67	**65**	0	**20**	64.0	32	21	19	17	72
Diego Castillo	7	3	3.64	59	0	7	54.1	40	27	22	22	53
Matt Festa	2	0	4.17	53	0	2	54.0	43	26	25	18	64
Erik Swanson	3	2	1.68	57	1	3	53.2	39	11	10	10	70
Matt Brash	4	4	4.44	39	5	0	50.2	46	25	25	33	62
Ryan Borucki	2	0	4.26	21	0	0	19.0	17	9	9	6	13
Tommy Milone	1	1	5.40	7	0	0	16.2	14	10	10	6	5
Sergio Romo	0	0	8.16	17	0	0	14.1	18	13	13	4	11
Drew Steckenrider	0	2	5.65	16	0	2	14.1	21	9	9	5	10
Anthony Misiewicz	0	1	4.61	17	0	0	13.2	14	7	7	6	8
Matthew Boyd	2	0	1.35	10	0	0	13.1	5	2	2	8	13
Justus Sheffield	1	0	3.86	6	1	0	11.2	9	5	5	6	7
Wyatt Mills	0	0	4.15	8	0	0	8.2	5	4	4	3	6
Yohan Ramírez	1	0	7.56	7	0	0	8.1	7	7	7	6	10
Roenis Elías	0	0	3.52	7	0	0	7.2	7	3	3	3	6
Ken Giles	0	0	0.00	5	0	0	4.1	1	0	0	4	6
Matt Koch	0	0	8.31	4	0	0	4.1	5	4	4	1	3
Danny Young	0	0	7.36	2	0	0	3.2	7	3	3	2	5
Brennan Bernardino	0	1	3.86	2	0	0	2.1	3	3	1	2	0
Luis Torrens	1	0	4.50	2	0	0	2.0	3	2	1	0	0
Riley O'Brien	0	0	0.00	1	0	0	1.0	1	0	0	1	1
**Team totals**	**90**	**72**	**3.59**	**162**	**162**	**40**	**1447.0**	**1277**	**623**	**577**	**447**	**1391**

== Farm system ==
Level	Team	League	Manager
AAA	Tacoma Rainiers	Pacific Coast League	Tim Federowicz
AA	Arkansas Travelers	Texas League	Collin Cowgill
High-A	Everett AquaSox	Northwest League	Eric Farris
A	Modesto Nuts	California League	Austin Knight
Rookie	ACL Mariners	Arizona Complex League	Luis Caballero
Foreign Rookie	DSL Mariners 1	Dominican Summer League	Nico Giarratano
Foreign Rookie	DSL Mariners 2	Dominican Summer League	
