= Jack Larsen (baseball) =

American baseball player (born 1995)

- Outfielder
- Born: January 13, 1995 (age 31); Newport Beach, California, U.S.

MLB debut
- July 31, 2022, for the Seattle Mariners

Last MLB appearance
- July 31, 2022, for the Seattle Mariners

MLB statistics
- Batting average: .000
- Home runs: 0
- Runs batted in: 0
- Stats at Baseball Reference

Teams
- Seattle Mariners (2022)

Jack Harter Larsen (born January 13, 1995) is an American former professional baseball outfielder. He played college baseball for the UC San Diego Tritons. The Seattle Mariners signed him as an undrafted free agent in 2017, and he played one game in Major League Baseball (MLB) with the team.

== Early life ==
Larsen was born in Newport Beach, California. He attended Capistrano Valley High School ('13) in Mission Viejo, California.

== Amateur career ==
Larsen attended the University of California, San Diego (UCSD), where he played college baseball for the UCSD Tritons. As a freshman in 2014, he batted to a .269/.382/.321 slash line in 156 at bats with 26 walks (sixth in the California Collegiate Athletic Association), starting in center field. As a sophomore in 2015, he batted .358 (fifth in the league)/.457(sixth)/.516 in 190 at bats with 5 home runs (fifth) and 49 RBIs (fourth), 38 walks (third; tied for 13th in NCAA Division II), 5 sacrifice flies (second), and 12 stolen bases (sixth) without being caught, playing primarily right field, and was named Daktronics All-West Region Second Team, NCBWA All-West Region Second Team, All-CCAA First Team, and one of 10 UCSD Athletes of the Year. As a junior in 2016, he batted .324/.398/.500 in 204 at bats playing primarily right field (with 10 outfield assists; tied for West Region-best), and was NCBWA All-West Region honorable mention, All-CCAA First Team, and one of 16 UCSD Athletes of the Year.

As a senior in 2017, he batted .362(eighth)/.497(leading the league)/.668(second) in 229 at bats, leading the league with 71 runs, 23 doubles, 15 home runs, 66 RBIs, and 56 walks (against 50 strikeouts), while playing primarily right field. He was named ABCA/Rawlings All-West Region Second Team, D2CCA All-West Region Second Team, NCBWA All-West Region honorable mention, All-CCAA Second Team, and one of 14 UCSD Athletes of the Year. He ended his UCSD career with 144 career walks (all-time school high), 27 home runs (fourth), 172 runs (fifth), 161 RBIs (fifth), and 51 doubles (seventh).

== Professional career ==
=== Seattle Mariners ===
The Seattle Mariners signed Larsen as an undrafted free agent on June 19, 2017. He made his professional debut that summer with the Arizona League Mariners, batting .312/.472 (leading the Arizona League of all batters with 100 or more at bats)/.541 in 109 at bats with 6 triples (fifth in the league) and 33 walks (fifth) against 33 strikeouts, playing primarily center field.

In 2018, Larsen split the season between the Single-A Clinton LumberKings and the High-A Modesto Nuts. He slashed. 246/.364(10th in the league)/.472(ninth) with 13 home runs and 70 RBIs in 387 at bats across 114 games. He was named a mid-season Midwest League All Star and an MiLB Organization All Star. He spent the 2019 season in Modesto, playing in 118 games and hitting .237/.335/.402 with 25 doubles (9th in the league), 6 triples (8th), 12 home runs, 63 RBIs, 65 walks (5th), and 157 strikeouts (3rd) in 443 at bats, playing primarily left field. Larsen did not play in 2020 due to the cancellation of the minor league season because of the COVID-19 pandemic.

In 2021, Larsen split the season between the High-A Everett AquaSox and the Double-A Arkansas Travelers, slashing a combined .295/.405/.524 in 410 a bats with career-highs in home runs (19), RBIs (84), and stolen bases (13), playing primarily center field. With Everett, he batted .308(eighth in the league)/.425(second nd)/.532(ninth) in 237 at bats with 25 doubles (fourth) and 45 walks (seventh). He received the Edgar Martinez Dominate the Zone Hitter Award as the Mariners organization hitter who best emobodied the ”Control the Zone” philosophy.

On July 31, 2022, Larsen was selected to the 40-man roster and promoted to the major leagues for the first time. He and Jared Kelenic were called up to replace the injured Julio Rodríguez and Dylan Moore. Larsen had one plate appearance in his only major league game, striking out against Jake Odorizzi of the Houston Astros. He was designated for assignment on August 2, replaced by Travis Jankowski. Larsen cleared waivers and was sent outright to Double-A Arkansas, where he spent the remainder of the season. With Arkansas in 2022, he batted .269/.371/.407 in 450 at bats with 88 runs (2nd), 4 triples (5th), and 72 walks (5th), playing primarily the corner outfield positions.

On March 10, 2023, it was announced that Larsen would require surgery after suffering a fractured hamate bone during spring training. In 2023 with Triple-A Tacoma, he batted .313/.466/.338 in 80 at-bats while playing primarily left field.

=== San Francisco Giants ===
On July 8, 2023, Larsen was traded to the San Francisco Giants. In 7 games for the Triple-A Sacramento River Cats, he went 2-for-20 (.100) with no home runs or RBI. On September 19, Larsen was released by the Giants organization.
