= Andrés Muñoz =

Mexican baseball player (born 1999)

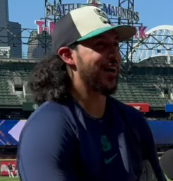
- Muñoz with the Seattle Mariners in 2024

Seattle Mariners – No. 75
- Pitcher
- Born: January 16, 1999 (age 27); Los Mochis, Mexico
- Bats: Right Throws: Right

MLB debut
- July 12, 2019, for the San Diego Padres

MLB statistics (through 2026 season)
- Win–loss record: 18–29
- Earned run average: 2.76
- Strikeouts: 443
- Saves: 106
- Stats at Baseball Reference

Teams
- San Diego Padres (2019); Seattle Mariners (2021–present)

Career highlights and awards
- 2× All-Star (2024, 2025)

Andrés Clemente Muñoz Apodaca (born January 16, 1999) is a Mexican professional baseball pitcher for the Seattle Mariners of Major League Baseball (MLB). He made his MLB debut with the San Diego Padres in 2019. Muñoz has been named an All-Star in 2024 and 2025 and All-MLB Second Team in 2025.

== Career ==
=== San Diego Padres ===
==== 2014–2018: Minor leagues ====
Muñoz signed with the San Diego Padres as an international free agent on July 7, 2015, receiving a $700,000 bonus. He made his professional debut in 2016 with the Arizona Padres of the Rookie-level Arizona League, going 1–1 with a 5.49 earned run average (ERA) in 16 games, mostly in relief, averaging 7.3 walks per nine innings.

In 2017, he played mostly for the Tri-City Dust Devils of the Class A Short Season Northwest League, joining the Fort Wayne TinCaps of the Class A Midwest League to pitch in three games at the end of the season. He was 3–0 with a 3.81 ERA in 24 relief appearances for both teams, with 38 strikeouts and 18 walks. After the season, he played 9 games for the Peoria Javelinas of the Arizona Fall League, where he was the league's youngest player.

Muñoz started 2018 with Tri-City and was promoted to the San Antonio Missions of the Double-A Texas League in late June. In 24 2/3 relief innings pitched between the two teams, he was 2–1 with a 0.73 ERA, with 28 strikeouts and 13 walks.

==== 2019–2020: Major league debut and arm injury ====
Muñoz began the 2019 season back in the Texas League, with the Amarillo Sod Poodles, going 0–2 with a 2.16 ERA, 34 strikeouts, and 11 walks over 16 2/3 innings. On May 21, he was promoted to the El Paso Chihuahuas of the Triple-A Pacific Coast League.

On July 12, 2019, the Padres selected Muñoz's contract and promoted him to the major leagues. He made his major league debut that night against the Atlanta Braves, striking out one batter and walking one in one inning, with his fastball topping out at 101.9 miles per hour. Muñoz earned his first career MLB save on August 29, allowing a run-scoring double to his future bullpen coach Stephen Vogt in the ninth inning of a 5–3 win over the San Francisco Giants. In 2019, his four-seam fastball was the second fastest in MLB, averaging 99.9 miles per hour (160.8 km/h). He finished with a record of 1–1 in 22 games, striking out 30 in 23 innings.

On March 19, 2020, Muñoz underwent Tommy John surgery, causing him to miss the entire 2020 season.

=== 2020–2022: Return from injury to setup role ===
On August 30, 2020, the Padres traded Muñoz, Ty France, Taylor Trammell, and Luis Torrens to the Seattle Mariners for catcher Austin Nola and relievers Dan Altavilla and Austin Adams. Muñoz returned to the 60-day injured list in February 2021, continuing to recover from Tommy John surgery. After four rehab appearances in the minors, he returned to make his Mariners debut in the team's last game of 2021.

On December 1, 2021, Muñoz and the Mariners agreed to a four-year contract extension worth $7.5 million. The contract included three additional team options for up to $24 million and bonuses for Muñoz based on the number of games he finishes.

Muñoz returned to a setup role in 2022, working with several other relievers generally ahead of closer Paul Sewald. He had a 2–5 record and 4 saves, with a 2.45 ERA and 96 strikeouts in 65 innings. His fastball averaged 100.2 miles per hour, but his slider was his most effective pitch, with batters hitting only .126 off his breaking ball. Walks, an issue for Muñoz earlier in his career, were not a concern, as he walked 6 percent of batters he faced, which was better than the MLB average. Muñoz pitched in every Mariners postseason game in 2022 but, like his team, was much less effective in the American League Division Series (ALDS). He pitched 2 2/3 scoreless innings against the Toronto Blue Jays in the Wild Card Series, picking up the series-clinching win in Game 2. In the Division Series, Muñoz allowed three runs in three innings, as the Mariners were swept in three games by the Houston Astros.

=== 2023–2026: Closer, back-to-back All-Star ===
Injuries slowed Muñoz to start 2023. A right deltoid strain sent him to the 10-day injured list on April 9 and shoulder inflammation kept him there until June 6. Ankle surgery also stalled his offseason preparation before 2023. Muñoz became a closer after Mariners dealt Sewald at the trade deadline. He handled the higher leverage role well, being named the American League (AL) Reliever of the Month for August. After getting two saves through the end of July, Muñoz earned 11 more after the Sewald trade. He finished his second full season in the Seattle bullpen with a 4–7 record with 67 strikeouts in 49 innings over 52 games.

On July 12, 2024, Muñoz was named to the All-Star Game as a replacement for teammate Logan Gilbert, though Muñoz did not pitch in the game. He did not allow a hit in 12 consecutive appearances, from July 5 to August 14, breaking a franchise record and yielding no runs during that streak. He had a career-high 22 saves in 2024, with a 3–7 record and 2.12 ERA, striking out 77 batters in 59 1/3 innings.

After beginning his 2025 campaign with 15 straight scoreless appearances, including 11 saves, Muñoz received the AL Reliever of the Month award for March/April 2025. He was named to the 2025 All-Star Game roster. He pitched in 64 games and earned 38 saves, both career highs, going 3–3 with a 1.74 ERA. In the postseason, he earned two saves in 8 1/3 scoreless innings.

In early August 2026, Muñoz was named one of the 50 greatest Mariners players. On August 16, he recorded his 100th career save. He had his worst season with Seattle, with a 4.24 ERA and 10 blown saves. His average fastball was the fastest since 2022 but he allowed more hits and home runs. After the season, the Mariners picked up his $9 million option for 2027.

== Personal life ==
Muñoz and his wife married in July 2022, during the All-Star break. They met as teenagers when they both competed in track and field. They have a pet cat, Matilda, who joins them on road trips.

Muñoz's older brother, Helmond, would provide Andrés with scouting reports on opposing batters. Muñoz was introduced to baseball at the age of 11 by his grandfather, Damazo. He has a second older brother.
