= Erik Swanson =

American baseball player (born 1993)

- Pitcher
- Born: September 4, 1993 (age 32); Fargo, North Dakota, U.S.
- Batted: Right Threw: Right

MLB debut
- April 11, 2019, for the Seattle Mariners

Last MLB appearance
- June 15, 2025, for the Toronto Blue Jays

MLB statistics
- Win–loss record: 11–16
- Earned run average: 3.97
- Strikeouts: 281
- Stats at Baseball Reference

Teams
- Seattle Mariners (2019–2022); Toronto Blue Jays (2023–2025)

Erik Donald Swanson (born September 4, 1993) is an American former professional baseball pitcher. He played in Major League Baseball (MLB) for the Seattle Mariners and Toronto Blue Jays.

== Amateur career ==
Swanson attended Mariemont High School in Cincinnati, Ohio. He graduated in 2012. Swanson attended Wabash Valley College for one year and then Iowa Western Community College for a year, playing college baseball at both schools and winning the JUCO World Series in 2014 with Iowa Western.

== Professional career ==
=== Texas Rangers ===
The Texas Rangers drafted Swanson in the eighth round, with the 246th overall selection, of the 2014 Major League Baseball draft. Swanson made his professional debut in 2014 with the Low-A Spokane Indians and he spent the whole season there, pitching to a 1–2 win–loss record with a 4.63 earned run average (ERA) with 24 strikeouts in 23 1/3 innings pitched out of the bullpen. He split the 2015 season between the rookie-level Arizona League Rangers, Single-A Hickory Crawdads, Double-A Frisco RoughRiders, and Triple-A Round Rock Express, compiling a combined 1–0 record and 2.35 ERA with strikeouts over 15 1/3 innings of work. Swanson returned to Hickory to begin the 2016 season.

=== New York Yankees ===
On August 1, 2016, Swanson was traded with Dillon Tate and Nick Green to the New York Yankees in exchange for Carlos Beltrán. He finished the year with the Single-A Charleston RiverDogs. In 24 appearances (17 starts) between the two minor league teams, Swanson was 6–5 with a 3.46 ERA with 93 strikeouts across 96 1/3 innings pitched.

Swanson spent 2017 with the High-A Tampa Yankees, where he logged a 7–3 record and 3.95 ERA with 84 strikeouts over 20 starts. He started the 2018 season with the Double-A Trenton Thunder, and rehabbed with the Low-A Staten Island Yankees during the year, before later being promoted to the Triple-A Scranton/Wilkes-Barre RailRiders in May. In 24 games (22 starts) with the three affiliates, Swanson went 8–2 with a 2.66 ERA and 1.00 WHIP with 139 strikeouts across 121 2/3 innings pitched.

=== Seattle Mariners ===
On November 19, 2018, the Yankees traded Swanson, Justus Sheffield, and Dom Thompson-Williams to the Seattle Mariners in exchange for James Paxton. The Mariners added him to their 40-man roster the next day. Swanson opened the 2019 season with the Tacoma Rainiers, with whom he recorded an 0–1 record and 5.55 ERA with 28 strikeouts in 24 1/3 innings.

The Mariners promoted Swanson to the major leagues for the first time on April 9, 2019. He made his major league debut on April 11. Swanson made 27 appearances (eight starts) for Seattle during his rookie campaign, logging a 1-5 record and 5.74 ERA with 52 strikeouts and two saves over 58 innings of work.

Swanson made nine appearances for the Mariners during the truncated 2020 season, but struggled to an 0-2 record and 12.91 ERA with nine strikeouts across 7 2/3 innings pitched. He pitched in 33 contests for Seattle in 2021, compiling an 0-3 record and 3.31 ERA with 35 strikeouts and one save across 53 2/3 innings of work.

During the 2022 season, Swanson made 57 appearances for the Mariners, primarily in relief, and posted a 3-2 record and 1.68 ERA with 70 strikeouts across 53 2/3 innings.

=== Toronto Blue Jays ===
On November 16, 2022, the Mariners traded Swanson and pitching prospect Adam Macko to the Toronto Blue Jays in exchange for Teoscar Hernández. He made 69 appearances out of the bullpen for Toronto in 2023, registering a 4-2 record and 2.97 ERA with 75 strikeouts and four saves across 66 2/3 innings pitched. Swanson pitched in 45 contests for the Blue Jays in 2024, compiling a 2-2 record and 5.03 ERA with 37 strikeouts over 39 1/3 innings of work.

Swanson began the 2025 campaign on the injured list due to median nerve entrapment in his throwing arm. He was transferred to the 60-day injured list on May 5, 2025. Swanson was activated for his season debut on June 1. In six appearances for Toronto, he struggled to a 1-0 record and 15.19 ERA with three strikeouts across 5 1/3 innings pitched. Swanson was designated for assignment by the Blue Jays on June 17. He was released by Toronto after clearing waivers on June 23.

Swanson announced his retirement from professional baseball on November 20, 2025.

== Personal life ==
Swanson was born in Fargo, North Dakota. His grandfather, Dwaine Hoberg, is a former mayor of Moorhead, Minnesota. Erik's father, Mark, played college football for the North Dakota State Bison. Erik lived in Fargo until he was five years old, when his family moved to Cincinnati. He also lived in Newburgh, Indiana for multiple years. Swanson moved back to Fargo in 2015. At the time of his retirement, Swanson was one of only two active MLB players born in North Dakota, with the other being pitcher Matt Strahm of the Philadelphia Phillies.

Swanson and his wife married in 2018 and reside in Fargo. They have two children together. On February 25, 2024, their son, Toby, was struck by a car in Dunedin, Florida and airlifted to a Florida children's hospital in critical condition. Less than a week later, Toby was released from the hospital, with Swanson stating "God is good".
