= Brian O'Keefe (baseball) =

American baseball player (born 1993)

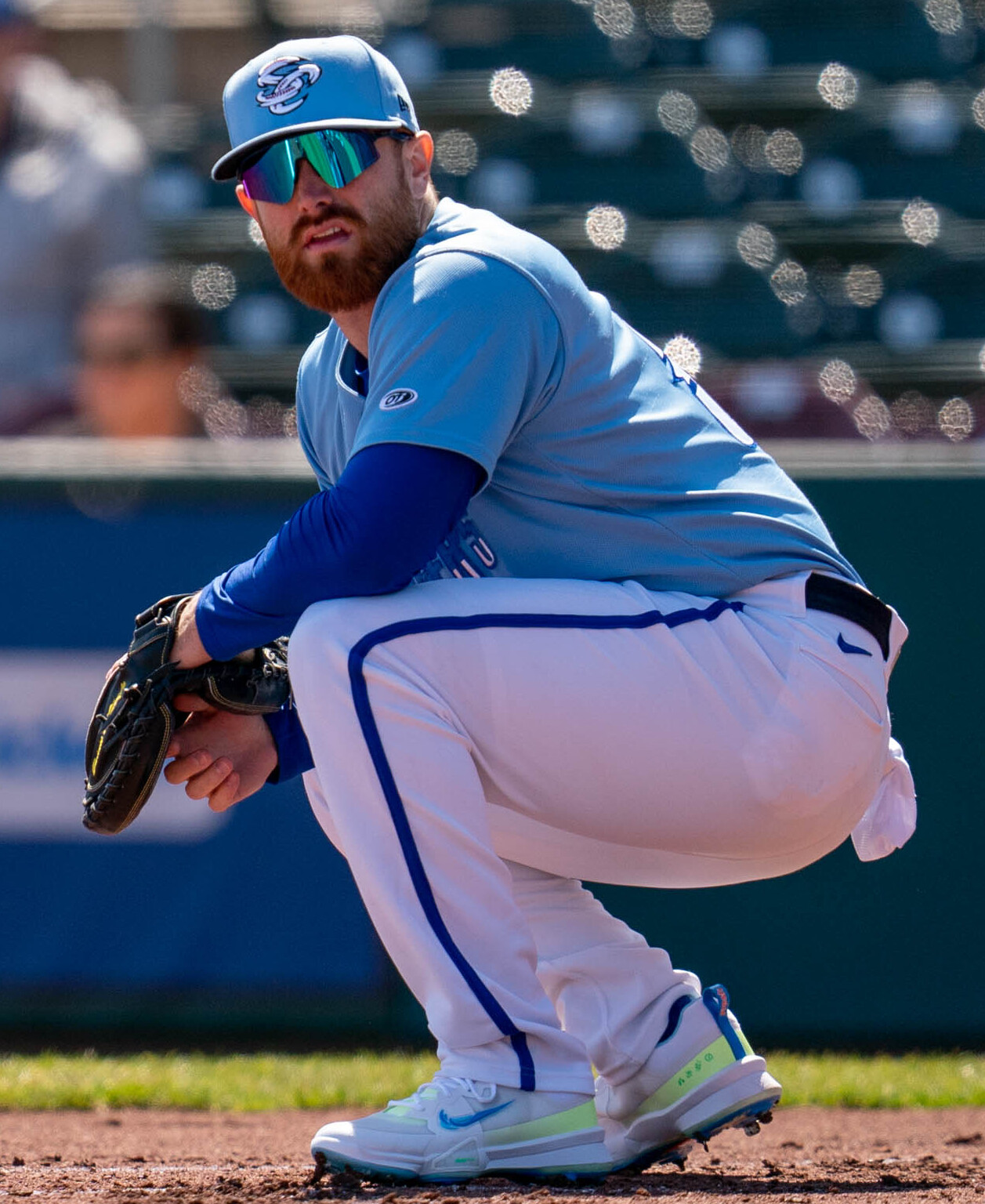
- O'Keefe with the Omaha Storm Chasers in 2024

Free agent
- Catcher
- Born: July 15, 1993 (age 33); Albany, New York, U.S.
- Bats: Right Throws: Right

MLB debut
- October 1, 2022, for the Seattle Mariners

MLB statistics (through 2023 season)
- Batting average: .136
- Home runs: 0
- Runs batted in: 2
- Stats at Baseball Reference

Teams
- Seattle Mariners (2022–2023)

Brian James O'Keefe (born July 15, 1993) is an American professional baseball catcher who is a free agent. He was drafted by the St. Louis Cardinals in the 7th round of the 2014 Major League Baseball draft and played in MLB with Seattle in 2022 and 2023.

== Career ==
=== Amateur career ===
O'Keefe attended South Colonie High School in Albany, New York, and Saint Joseph's University, where played college baseball for the Saint Joseph's Hawks. In 2014, his junior year at Saint Joseph's, he had a .350/.423/.519 slash line with seven home runs and 43 runs batted in (RBI) over 50 games.

=== St. Louis Cardinals ===
After the season, he was drafted by the St. Louis Cardinals in the seventh round of the 2014 Major League Baseball draft. O'Keefe made his professional debut with the Low-A State College Spikes, batting .239 with three home runs and 17 RBI in 47 games. He split the 2015 season between State College and the Single-A Peoria Chiefs, accumulating a .241/.311/.397 slash in 47 games. In 2016, O'Keefe played for Peoria and the High-A Palm Beach Cardinals, clubbing 13 home runs and 64 RBI to go along with a .252/.361/.436 triple slash. O'Keefe split the 2017 campaign between Peoria, Palm Beach, and the Double-A Springfield Cardinals, hitting .262/.320/.433 with a career-high 15 home runs and 48 RBI in 101 games between the three affiliates. He returned to Palm Beach for a third season in 2018, batting .243/.358/.412 with 6 home runs and 44 RBI in 73 contests. In 2019, O'Keefe spent the year with Springfield, slashing .229/.319/.389 with 13 home runs and 40 RBI in 88 games.

=== Seattle Mariners ===
On December 12, 2019, the Seattle Mariners selected O'Keefe in the minor league phase of the Rule 5 draft after he had spent six years in the Cardinals' minor league system. O'Keefe did not play in a game in 2020 due to the cancellation of the minor league season because of the COVID-19 pandemic. He spent the 2021 campaign split between the Double-A Arkansas Travelers and the Triple-A Tacoma Rainiers, logging a slash of .269/.349/.485 while posting career-highs in home runs (24) and RBI (70) in 105 combined games. He elected free agency following the season on November 7.

On December 3, 2021, O'Keefe re-signed with the Mariners organization on a minor league contract and received an invitation to spring training. He did not make the club out of spring and was assigned to Triple-A Tacoma to begin the 2022 season. On September 30, O'Keefe was selected to the 40-man roster and promoted to the major leagues for the first time. The following day, O'Keefe hit his first major league hit off Oakland Athletics pitcher JP Sears. He appeared in two games for Seattle, going 1-for-3 (.333) with a walk. He was not on the Mariners' postseason roster. On November 18, O'Keefe was non-tendered and became a free agent. On December 27, he re-signed with the Mariners on a minor league deal.

O'Keefe was assigned to Tacoma to begin the 2023 season, where he played in 86 games and batted .240/.325/.511 with 22 home runs and 65 RBI. On August 16, the Mariners selected O'Keefe's contract, adding him to the major league roster. In 8 games for Seattle, he went 2-for-19 (.105) with two walks and two RBI. On October 13, O'Keefe was designated for assignment following the waiver claim of Kaleb Ort. He cleared waivers and was sent outright to Triple-A Tacoma on October 17. O'Keefe elected free agency on November 6.

=== Kansas City Royals ===
On February 13, 2024, O'Keefe signed a minor league contract with the Minnesota Twins. He was released by the Twins organization on March 27.

On April 1, 2024, O'Keefe signed a minor league contract with the Kansas City Royals. In 72 appearances for the Triple-A Omaha Storm Chasers, he batted .281/.364/.554 with 18 home runs and 58 RBI. On October 29, O'Keefe re-signed with the Royals on a new minor league contract. O'Keefe made 43 appearances for Triple-A Omaha in 2025, slashing .158/.236/.274 with four home runs, 10 RBI, and two stolen bases. The Royals released O'Keefe on June 23.

=== Lake Country DockHounds ===
On July 14, 2025, O'Keefe signed with the Lake Country DockHounds of the American Association of Professional Baseball. In 42 games for the DockHounds, he batted .288/.377/.513 with eight home runs, 24 RBI, and one stolen base.

=== Seattle Mariners (second stint) ===
On January 30, 2026, O'Keefe signed a minor league contract with the Seattle Mariners. He made 37 appearances for the Triple–A Tacoma Rainiers, batting .241/.307/.409 with four home runs, 15 RBI, and one stolen base. O'Keefe was released by the Mariners organization on July 20.

== See also ==
- Rule 5 draft results
