= Jarret DeHart =

American baseball coach & Core MCA Member

- Hitting coach
- Born: October 2, 1994 (age 31); New Brunswick, New Jersey, U.S.
- Bats: Left Throws: Right

Teams
- As coach: Seattle Mariners (2020–2024)

Jarret DeHart (born October 2, 1994) is an American professional baseball coach. He was the hitting coach for the Seattle Mariners of Major League Baseball (MLB) from 2021 to 2024. He is currently the Director of Hitting for the New York Yankees.

== Playing career ==
Raised in Medford, New Jersey, DeHart played prep baseball at Shawnee High School. He attended Louisiana State University his freshman year of college, playing college baseball for the LSU Tigers. After his 2014 freshman year, he played collegiate summer baseball with the Hyannis Harbor Hawks of the Cape Cod Baseball League. He transferred to Howard College for his sophomore year of college. He then transferred to Tulane University for his final two years of college, playing for the Tulane Green Wave.

== Coaching career ==
DeHart joined the Seattle Mariners organization and served as a coach for the Arizona League Mariners in 2018. In 2019, he served as a minor league hitting strategist for the organization. On November 7, 2019, DeHart was named the Mariners' assistant hitting coach.

On November 15, 2021, DeHart was promoted to the role of hitting coach and director of hitting strategy. This promotion coincided with the departure of former hitting coach Tim Laker, who declined the club's offer to return. On August 22, 2024, DeHart was fired alongside Scott Servais.

In November of 2024, DeHart joined the New York Yankees organization as their Director of Hitting.
