= Matt Festa =

American baseball player (born 1993)

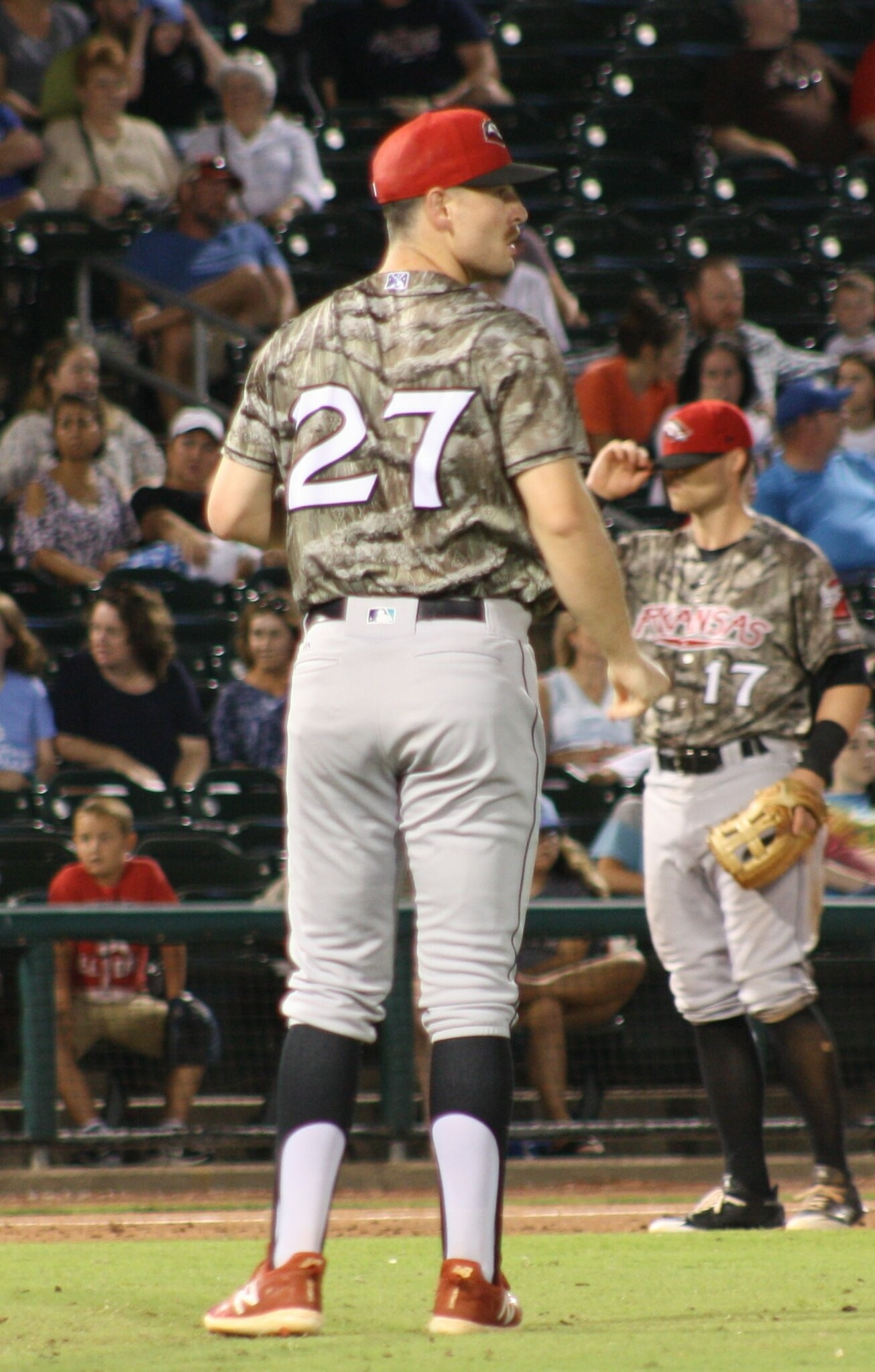
- Festa with the Arkansas Travelers

Cleveland Guardians – No. 52
- Pitcher
- Born: March 11, 1993 (age 33); Brooklyn, New York, U.S.
- Bats: Right Throws: Right

MLB debut
- July 14, 2018, for the Seattle Mariners

MLB statistics (through 2026 season)
- Win–loss record: 15–10
- Earned run average: 4.26
- Strikeouts: 251
- Stats at Baseball Reference

Teams
- Seattle Mariners (2018–2019, 2022–2023); New York Mets (2024); Texas Rangers (2024); Cleveland Guardians (2025–present)

Matthew Joseph Festa (born March 11, 1993) is an American professional baseball pitcher for the Cleveland Guardians of Major League Baseball (MLB). He has previously played in MLB for the Seattle Mariners, New York Mets, and Texas Rangers. He has also played for the Italy national baseball team.

== Early life ==
Festa was born in Brooklyn, New York, and raised in the Bulls Head and Great Kills sections of Staten Island, New York. He grew up a fan of the New York Yankees. He graduated from St. Joseph by the Sea High School in 2011.

== College ==
He enrolled at Dominican College, where he played college baseball for the Chargers for one year, and transferred to East Stroudsburg University of Pennsylvania, where he pitched for the East Stroudsburg Warriors for three years. He majored in business management. Festa was an All-America selection at ESU in 2016.

== Professional career ==
=== Seattle Mariners ===
The Seattle Mariners selected the right hander in the seventh round, with the 207th overall selection of the 2016 Major League Baseball draft. He was the highest draft pick in East Stroudsburg University program history.

In 2016, Festa pitched for the Everett AquaSox of the Low-A Northwest League, posting a 6–2 win–loss record with a 3.73 earned run average (ERA) in 14 games (eight starts). Festa pitched for the Modesto Nuts of the High-A California League in 2017, where he went 4–2 with a 3.23 ERA with 99 strikeouts in 69 2/3 innings pitched, and appeared in the league's all-star game. In 2018, the Mariners invited Festa to spring training. He began the regular season with the Arkansas Travelers of the Double-A Texas League, and the Mariners promoted him to the major leagues on July 14. He made his major league debut that day.

Festa made the Mariners' Opening Day roster in 2019. Festa was sent down to the Tacoma Rainiers of the Triple-A Pacific Coast League multiple times during the season, ending his 2019 season with just 20 appearances for Seattle. On February 3, 2020, Festa was designated for assignment and outrighted to Tacoma on February 10. On March 5, Festa underwent Tommy John surgery, ending his 2020 season before it began. He returned to action in August 2021 for Tacoma, and pitched 21 1/3 innings of 2.95 ERA ball for the team, also appearing in four rehab games with the High-A Everett AquaSox and AZL Mariners.

The Mariners invited Festa to spring training as a non-roster player in 2022. Starting in the 2022 season, Festa decided to go by his full first name of Matthew instead of his abbreviated name Matt. On April 7, the Mariners selected Festa's contract, adding him to their Opening Day roster. On July 17, Festa earned his first career save, striking out the side in the 10th inning to protect a one-run lead over the Texas Rangers. He finished the 2022 regular season making 53 appearances for Seattle, posting a 4.17 ERA with 64 strikeouts in 54.0 innings of work. He also saw his first playoff action, pitching effectively in his two appearances. In 3.1 innings, he allowed only one baserunner and one run, for an ERA of. 2.70. In 2023, Festa made 8 appearances, logging a 4.00 ERA with 13 strikeouts in 9.0 innings pitched. On August 8, Festa was designated for assignment by the Mariners. He was released by the team the same day.

=== San Diego Padres ===
On January 26, 2024, Festa signed a minor league contract with the San Diego Padres. In 16 games for the Triple–A El Paso Chihuahuas, he posted a 4.50 ERA with 16 strikeouts across 16 innings pitched. On May 16, Festa was released by the Padres organization.

=== New York Mets ===
On May 19, 2024, Festa signed a minor league contract with the New York Mets. In 11 appearances for the Triple–A Syracuse Mets, he recorded a 1.76 ERA with 19 strikeouts across 15 1/3 innings of work. On June 30, the Mets selected Festa's contract, adding him to the active roster. He entered a rain-delayed June 30 game against the Houston Astros when it was tied 5-5 in the top of the 11th inning and gave up five runs (four earned) in a 10-5 loss. That was his only appearance as a Met, as Festa was designated for assignment on July 3. He cleared waivers and elected free agency on July 5.

=== Texas Rangers ===
On July 8, 2024, Festa signed a minor league contract with the Texas Rangers. In four appearances for the Triple–A Round Rock Express, he recorded a 1.42 ERA with six strikeouts across 6 1/3 innings pitched. Festa was released by the Rangers organization on August 1. On August 6, he re–signed with the Rangers on a new minor league contract. On August 11, the Rangers selected Festa's contract, adding him to their active roster. In 18 appearances for Texas, he logged a 6-0 record and 4.37 ERA with 23 strikeouts across 22 2/3 innings pitched. The Rangers designated Festa for assignment on January 6, 2025.

On January 9, 2025, Festa was traded to the Chicago Cubs in exchange for cash considerations. He was designated for assignment following the acquisition of Ryan Pressly on January 28. Festa cleared waivers and elected free agency on February 3. On February 5, Festa signed a minor league contract to return to the Rangers organization. He made nine scoreless appearances for Round Rock, posting a 2-0 record with 20 strikeouts and one save over 14 2/3 innings pitched.

=== Cleveland Guardians ===
On April 30, 2025, Festa was traded to the Cleveland Guardians in exchange for cash considerations. On May 2, the Guardians selected Festa's contract, adding him to their active roster. Festa went on to see the most major league action of his career, appearing in 63 games for Cleveland, posting a 5-4 won loss record and an ERA of 4.12 over the course of 54.2 innings pitched. In the 2025 playoffs, Festa made one appearance, retiring two batters, one by strikeout, and walking the other, while posting a 0.00 ERA. Shortly after the season ended, the Guardians re-signed Festa for a reported $1 million to return for 2026.

Over the 2026 regular season, Festa was highly used out of the Cleveland bulllen, although at times he appeared to be seen more as an innings eater than as someone who could be relied upon in a big spot. He finished the regular season setting new personal highs in both appearances and innings pitched, at 66 and 66.2 respectively, improving his ERA to 3.78 while finishing with a 2-3 record. He made his last regular season appearance on Sep 25, giving up 2 runs in one inning against the Kansas City Royals, before being buried by Guardians' manager Stephen Vogt. Although Festa was on the team's postseason roster in the ALDS against the Chicago White Sox and again in the ALCS against the Tampa Bay Rays, Festa remained unused throughout all five games of the former despite his team's desperate needed for bullpen support, and only made his first appearance in the latter in game 4, pitching 1.1 innings. After throwing a scoreless 8th inning to keep the Guardians within two runs, he gave up a walk and then a 2 run HR to Yandy Diaz, allowing the Rays to expand their lead to 7-3, which was how game ended, tying the series at two games apiece.

== International career ==
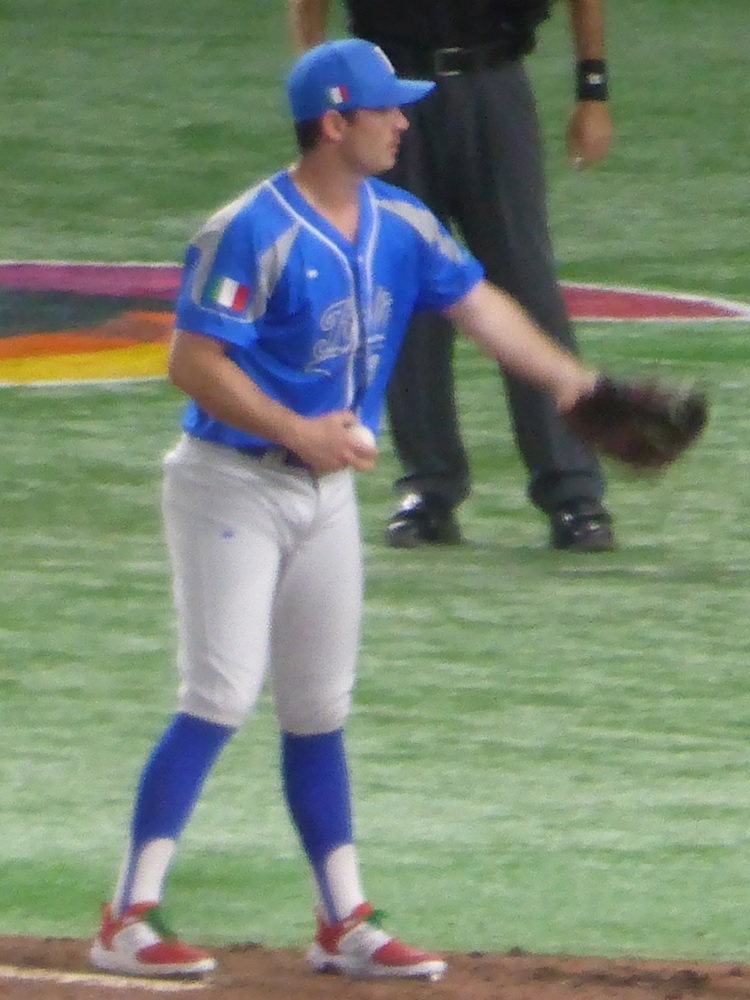
Festa with the Italian national team in the 2023 World Baseball Classic

In March 2023, Festa played for Team Italy in the 2023 World Baseball Classic in Tokyo. He played for Italy again in the 2026 World Baseball Classic in Houston and Miami.

== Personal life ==
Festa married Fox News reporter and former Miss Washington Danamarie McNicholl in November 2025.
