= J. P. Crawford =

American baseball player (born 1995)

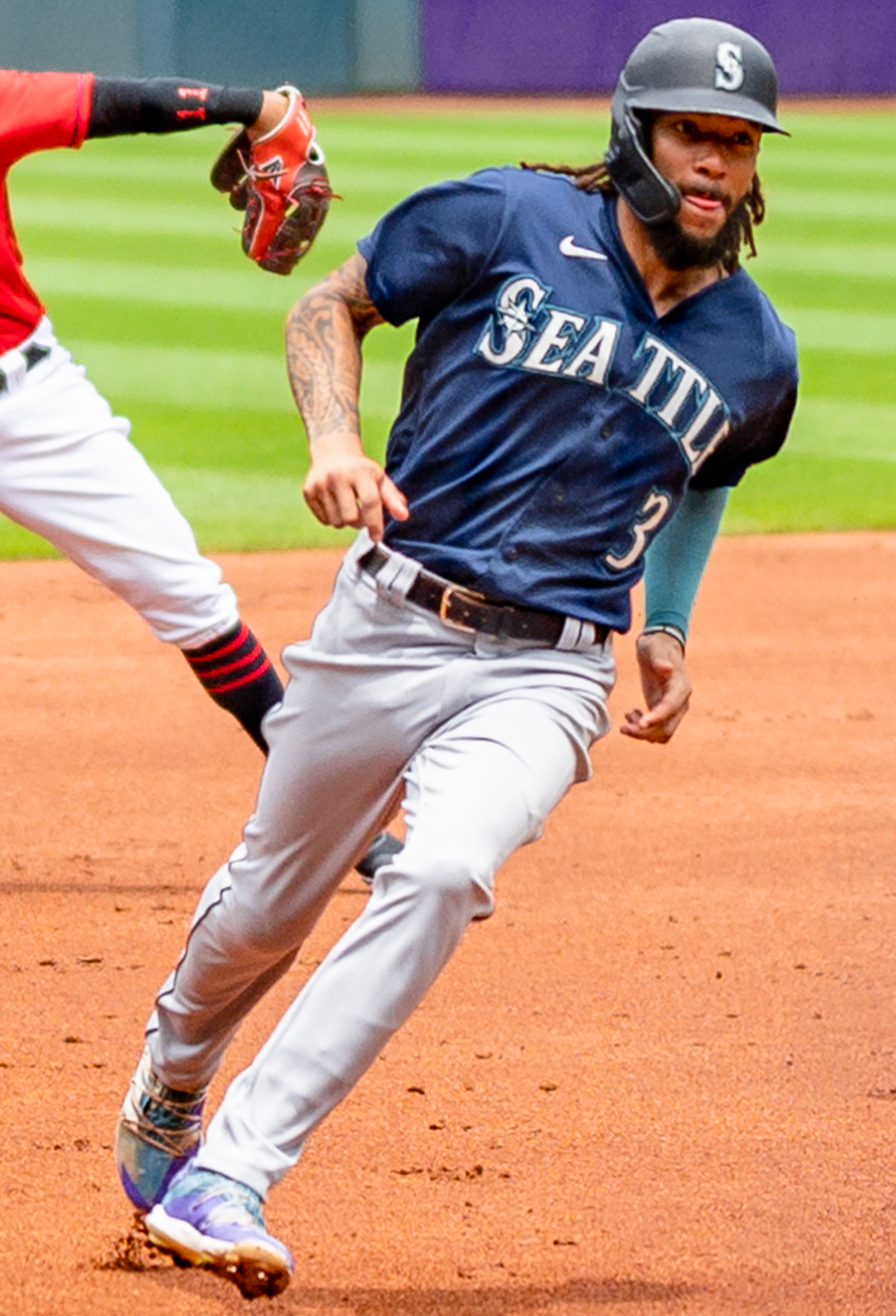
- Crawford with the Seattle Mariners in 2021

Free agent
- Shortstop
- Born: January 11, 1995 (age 31); Long Beach, California, U.S.
- Bats: Left Throws: Right

MLB debut
- September 5, 2017, for the Philadelphia Phillies

MLB statistics (through 2026 season)
- Batting average: .245
- Home runs: 81
- Runs batted in: 384
- Stats at Baseball Reference

Teams
- Philadelphia Phillies (2017–2018); Seattle Mariners (2019–2026)

Career highlights and awards
- Gold Glove Award (2020)

John Paul Crawford (born January 11, 1995) is an American professional baseball shortstop who is a free agent. He has played in Major League Baseball (MLB) for the Philadelphia Phillies and Seattle Mariners.

Growing up in Lakewood, California, Crawford attended Lakewood High School. He was considered one of the nation's best teenage baseball players. The Phillies drafted him in the first round of the 2013 MLB draft, and he began his career as the organization's top prospect for much of his rise through their minor league system. He was promoted to the major leagues in 2017, playing at shortstop and third base.

After an unproductive rookie season in 2018, the Phillies traded Crawford to the Mariners. He won a Gold Glove Award in 2020, signed a contract extension with Seattle in 2022, and led the American League in walks in 2023. In 2025, he became the franchise leader in games played at shortstop.

== Early life ==
Crawford was born on January 11, 1995, in Long Beach, California, to Beth and Larry Crawford; he has two sisters. His father, a former professional football defensive back, was a four-time All-Star in the Canadian Football League (CFL) and won the Grey Cup with the BC Lions in the 1985. Crawford's mother received a scholarship offer to play college volleyball. His older sister, a softball player for the Cal State Fullerton Titans, brought him to batting practices and encouraged him. Crawford was involved in baseball programs for youth in nearby Compton, including the Urban Youth Academy and Reviving Baseball in Inner Cities.

In 2009, Crawford began attending Lakewood High School. Baseball coach Spud O'Neil recalled Crawford "was 6'2" and skinny as a rail" but recognized his flair defensively and installed Crawford at shortstop as a freshman. Crawford set several team records. By the end of his senior year, he led in career hits (179), runs scored (162), stolen bases (73) and walks (72). His senior season, his mother was diagnosed with throat cancer, and he would regularly drive her to chemotherapy treatment.

Crawford accepted a scholarship offer to play college baseball with the University of Southern California Trojans but chose to play professionally instead.

== Professional career ==
=== Philadelphia Phillies ===
==== Draft and minor leagues ====
In 2011, Crawford's junior year, he was evaluated by Marti Wolever, the assistant general manager of the Philadelphia Phillies. Crawford's discovery by the Phillies was inadvertent; Wolever said he first watched Crawford while scouting another Lakewood prospect, pitcher Shane Watson, the Phillies' first-round draft pick in the 2012 Major League Baseball (MLB) draft. Wolever said in 2012, "I thought [Crawford] was one of the best players we saw last year," and anticipated that Crawford would be ready for the major leagues in three or four years. The Phillies selected Crawford in the first round, 16th overall, of the 2013 MLB draft, and he signed on June 18, receiving a $2.3 million signing bonus.

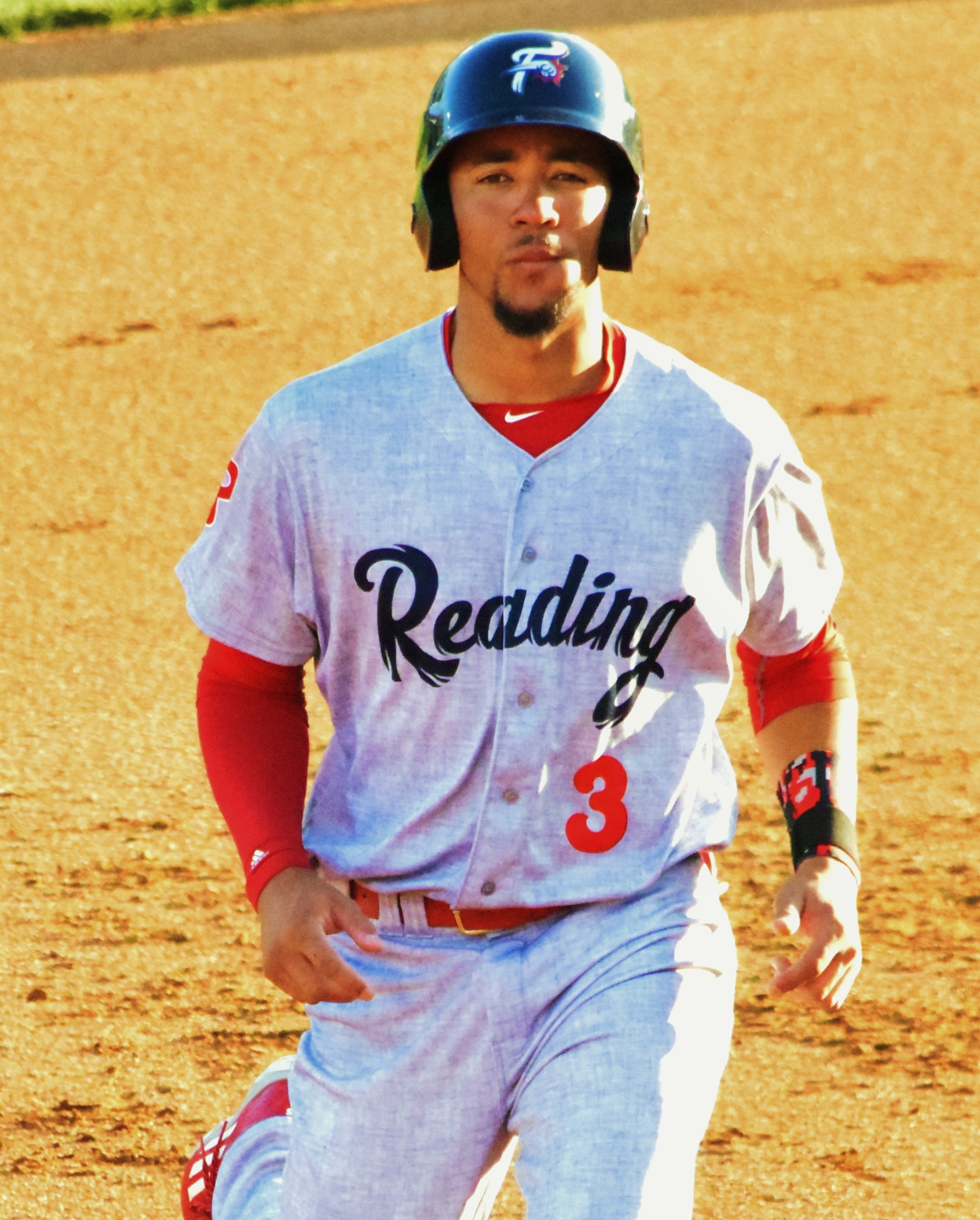
Crawford with Reading in 2016

The Phillies had high expectations for Crawford, including becoming the eventual long-term replacement for former MVP shortstop Jimmy Rollins. Crawford made his professional debut with the Gulf Coast Phillies of the Gulf Coast League (GCL) within weeks of signing. He adjusted well at the plate: in 39 games with the GCL Phillies, Crawford led the league in both batting average (.345) and on-base percentage (OBP) (.443), earning a promotion to the Single-A Lakewood BlueClaws in August. Returning to Lakewood in 2014, Crawford focused on his plate discipline. He finished the minor league season, which included a promotion to the Clearwater Threshers in June, with a strikeout-to-walk ratio close to 1-to-1. Crawford became the Phillies' top prospect, according to Baseball America, for the rest of his ascent through the team's farm system.

Crawford's 2015 season was cut short by his first significant injury, a torn ligament in his left thumb. Playing 104 games, between Clearwater and the Double-A Reading Fightin Phils, he finished his season hitting .288 with six home runs, 42 runs batted in (RBIs), and 12 stolen bases. Crawford worked to develop power in 2016, but by early 2017, with the Triple-A Lehigh Valley IronPigs, Crawford struggled to hit, batting just .175 with one home run on May 25. Crawford returned to form in his next 85 games, posting a .275 batting average and 14 home runs, more than he had in any minor league season. On July 26, Crawford hit an inside-the-park grand slam at Coca-Cola Park, finishing with a decoy slide under the tag of Gwinnett catcher David Freitas.

With Freddy Galvis set as the Phillies' shortstop, Crawford began playing third base for the IronPigs on August 20, in anticipation of a time share with the struggling Maikel Franco. In the latter half of 2017, the Phillies had supplemented their major league team with young players including Rhys Hoskins and Jorge Alfaro. Phillies manager Pete Mackanin expressed interest in Crawford, hoping the prospect could play regularly in the majors before the end of 2017.

==== Major leagues (2017–2018) ====
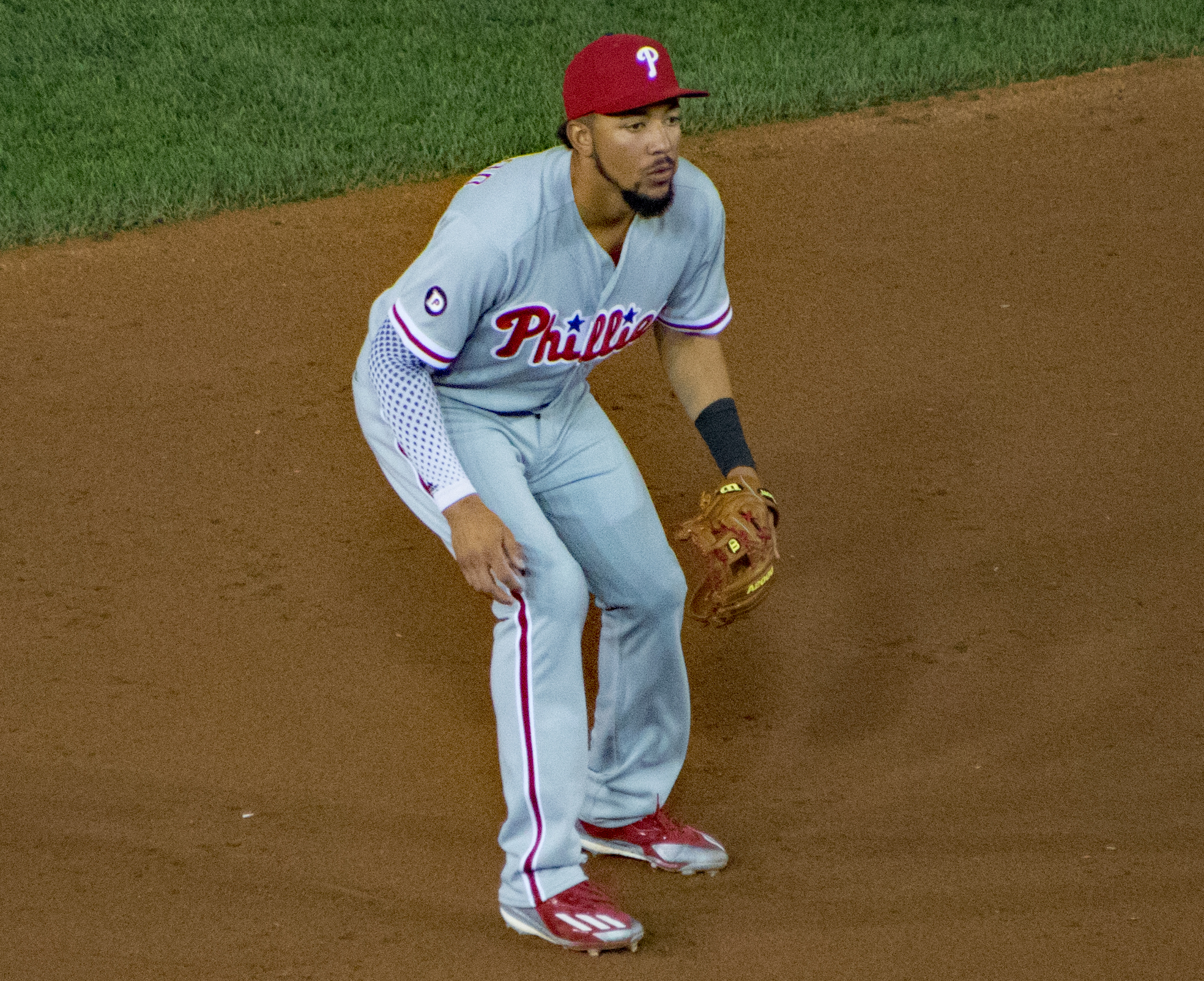
Crawford with the Phillies in 2017

Crawford was promoted to the Phillies on September 5, 2017. Playing at third base in his MLB debut, he went 1-for-5, hitting into a fielder's choice in his first at bat, before singling to center field in the fifth inning. The Phillies won, 9–1. Mackanin rotated Crawford between shortstop, third base, and second base during the final month of the season. He batted .214 with six RBIs in 23 games.

Crawford became the Phillies' 2018 Opening Day shortstop after the team traded Galvis to the San Diego Padres in December 2017. Philadelphia, under new manager Gabe Kapler, wanted its players to "control the strike zone" and have high OBPs. In his first 20 games, Crawford struggled, batting .190 while committing five errors. He was placed on the 10-day disabled list (DL) on April 29 with a strained right forearm. He returned on June 6, sharing starts at third base with Franco as Scott Kingery became the team's primary shortstop. Facing the St. Louis Cardinals on June 19, Crawford was hit by a pitch, breaking his left hand and returning him to the DL. After rehabbing, he struggled to find consistent playing time for the remainder of the season, limiting him to just six starts. He finished his rookie season batting .214 with three home runs and 12 RBIs.

=== Seattle Mariners ===
==== 2019–2021 ====
On December 3, 2018, the Phillies traded Crawford and Carlos Santana to the Seattle Mariners for Jean Segura, James Pazos, and Juan Nicasio. Crawford said the trade "saved his career" and that he had negative interactions with Philadelphia fans, whom he called "ruthless." Crawford began the 2019 season with the Triple-A Tacoma Rainiers. On May 10, the Mariners called up Crawford following an impressive stretch in Tacoma when he hit .319/.420/.457 with 7 doubles, 3 home runs, and 15 RBI, reaching base in all 31 games he played. He made his Mariners debut the same day against the Boston Red Sox at Fenway Park. Crawford's first home run as a Mariner came off Michael Pineda of the Minnesota Twins on May 16. He had a career-high 4 hits with a home run and sacrifice fly on June 23. Crawford spent the rest of the season as the starting shortstop for Seattle, hitting .226 with 7 home runs and 46 RBI in 93 games.

In 2020, Crawford batted .255/.336/.338 with two home runs, 24 RBIs, and 33 runs scored in 53 games during the pandemic-shortened season. He won the Gold Glove Award as the best defensive shortstop in the American League (AL). Crawford later credited infield coach Perry Hill with improving his defense.

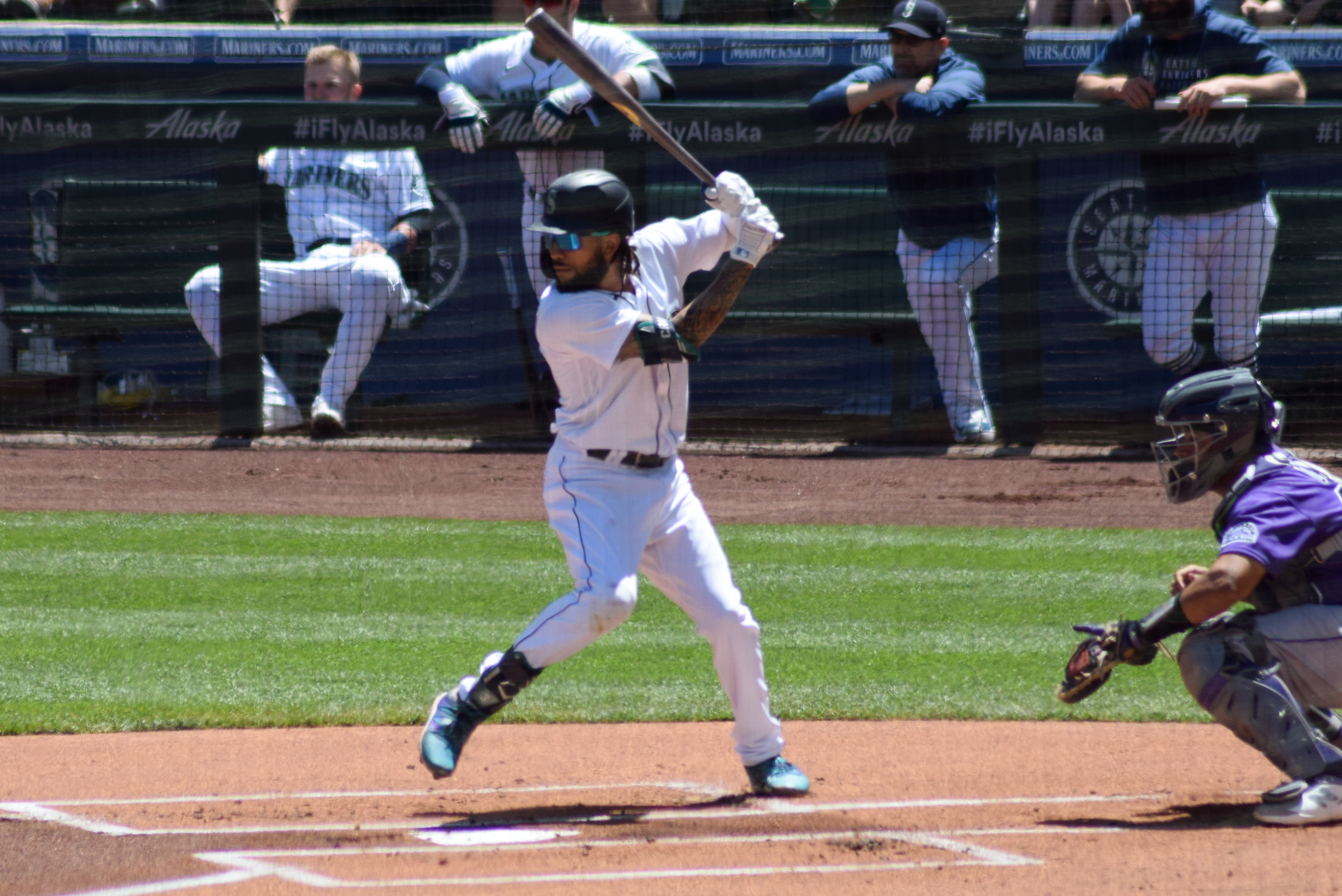
Crawford batting with the Mariners in 2021

On June 19, 2021, Crawford hit his first MLB grand slam off of Tampa Bay Rays pitcher Josh Fleming. He finished the season batting .273/.338/.376 with 9 home runs and 54 RBIs in a career-best 160 games. He led major league shortstops with 222 putouts.

==== 2022: contract extension and playoffs ====
On March 22, 2022, Crawford signed a $4.85 million contract with the Mariners, avoiding salary arbitration. Then, on April 8, Crawford signed a five-year, $51 million contract extension with Seattle, lasting through the 2026 season. On June 26, Crawford was ejected following a bench-clearing brawl in Anaheim that started after Los Angeles Angels pitcher Andrew Wantz hit Jesse Winker in the thigh by a pitch. Winker later got into an altercation with Ryan Tepera of the Angels, in which Crawford was seen punching Tepera. Umpires ejected Crawford and several players from both teams. It was Crawford's first career ejection.

Crawford finished the regular season with a .243 average and 6 home runs, both worse than 2021, but showed improved patience, walking in 11 percent of plate appearances. He had a below-average defensive season according to Statcast and FanGraphs metrics.

Crawford hit a game-tying, bases-clearing double in the Mariners' 10–9 win in Game 2 of the AL Wild Card Series against the Toronto Blue Jays, a bloop hit in which center fielder George Springer was injured after colliding with teammate Bo Bichette. It was Crawford's only hit in the two-game sweep. He hit a home run off Justin Verlander Game 1 of the AL Division Series (ALDS). He batted 4-for-21 in five postseason games.

==== 2023: AL walks leader ====
Crawford's dip in offensive production in 2022 saw him begin the 2023 season batting towards the bottom of Seattle's lineup. However, by the end of April, he had shown himself to be a dependable option at leadoff and flourished in this role during the rest of the season. During the previous offseason, Crawford worked on his hitting at Driveline Baseball. On September 28, Crawford hit a two-out, 2-RBI walk-off single off Jonathan Hernández of the Texas Rangers, which both kept Mariners' postseason chances alive and prevented the Rangers from clinching a playoff berth. The next night, Crawford hit his third career grand slam in an 8–0 victory over Texas. In 2023, he batted .266/.380/.438 with a career-high 19 home runs, more than doubling his previous high of 9 in 2021. Combined with his AL-leading 94 walks, he received four downballot MVP votes, finishing tied for 16th with Bichette.

==== 2024 ====
Crawford dealt with injuries and offensive regression in 2024. Three weeks into the season, he was placed on the injured list (IL) with an oblique strain, sidelining him for a month. He hit poorly before the injury, with a .598 on-base plus slugging in his first 23 games, down from .818 in 2023. He was hit by a pitch from former teammate Tyler Anderson on July 22, breaking his pinkie and missing another month. He returned to the IL, coming back on August 28. In the final month of the season, he was moved from the leadoff spot back to the bottom of the lineup. He finished the season batting .202 with 9 home runs and 52 walks in 105 games.

==== 2025–2026 ====
After the first month of the 2025 season, Crawford was moved back up to the leadoff spot and hit his franchise-record third first-pitch home run on May 4. On July 10, he set a franchise record for games played at shortstop, surpassing Alex Rodriguez. Crawford homered in that game. However, he returned to the bottom of the batting order at the end of July. On August 1, he hit a walk-off home run to beat the Rangers. In late August, Crawford became the longest tenured current Mariner, after the team released Dylan Moore. Crawford finished the regular season batting .265/.352/.370 with 12 home runs, 58 RBI, and a career-high 8 stolen bases. He ranked in the top 10 in the AL in walks, singles, and sacrifice bunts. Crawford again rated as a below average defensive shortstop, according to advanced metrics.

Crawford pulled a home run in Game 3 of the ALDS against the Detroit Tigers. In Game 5, Crawford singled and scored the winning run in the bottom of the 15th inning, sending the Mariners to the AL Championship Series for the first time since 2001.

Crawford began the 2026 season on the IL with a sore right shoulder, returning to the roster for the team's first road trip. Through the 2026 season, Crawford played 972 games for the Mariners at shortstop.

== Personal life ==
Crawford and his wife married on December 11, 2021. Their daughter was born on December 4, 2024. They live in Woodinville and have pet huskies named Loki and Alaina. Crawford said his dogs can recognize him when he is interviewed on TV. His dogs celebrated his walk-off sacrifice fly in May 2024. Another pet husky, Thor, died in August 2025.

Crawford's first cousin, once removed is former MLB All-Star Carl Crawford. His first cousin twice removed and Carl's son, Justin Crawford, was also a Phillies first-round draft pick, taken 17th overall in the 2022 MLB draft. Justin debuted in MLB in 2026.

Both of Crawford's sisters played collegiate sports at Cal State Fullerton. His older sister played softball, and his younger sister played volleyball.

Growing up, Crawford was a Los Angeles Dodgers fan, and Derek Jeter was his favorite player.

Crawford is a founder of Baseball Generations, an organization promoting baseball players in underserved communities that has organized showcase games. Crawford was the Mariners' nominee for the Roberto Clemente Award in 2024 and 2025 for his philanthropy.
