= Paul Sewald =

American baseball player (born 1990)

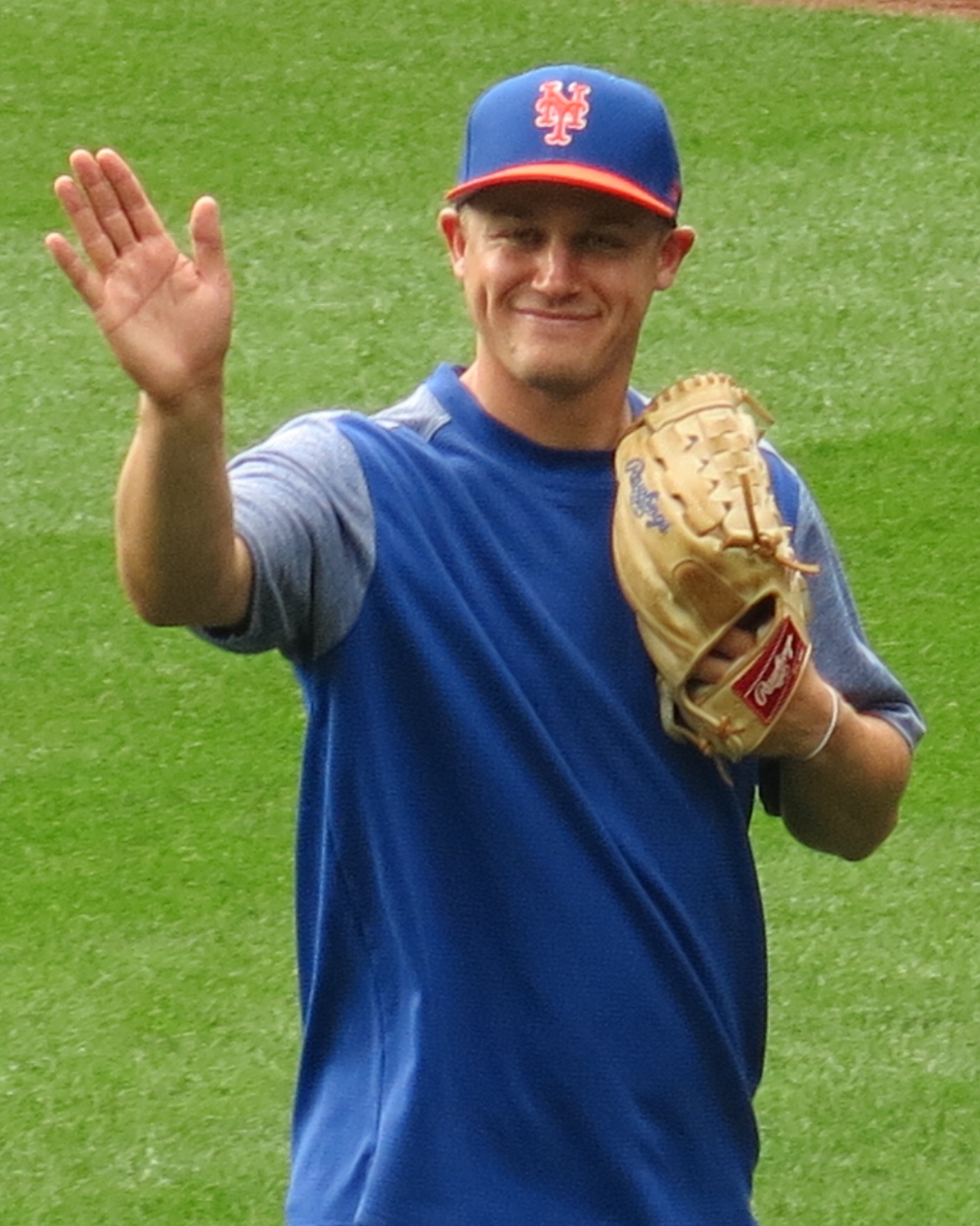
- Sewald with the Mets in 2017

Free agent
- Pitcher
- Born: May 26, 1990 (age 36); Las Vegas, Nevada, U.S.
- Bats: Right Throws: Right

MLB debut
- April 8, 2017, for the New York Mets

MLB statistics (through 2026 season)
- Win–loss record: 23–31
- Earned run average: 4.19
- Strikeouts: 523
- Saves: 110
- Stats at Baseball Reference

Teams
- New York Mets (2017–2020); Seattle Mariners (2021–2023); Arizona Diamondbacks (2023–2024); Cleveland Guardians (2025); Detroit Tigers (2025); Arizona Diamondbacks (2026); Toronto Blue Jays (2026)
Medals
Men's baseball
Representing United States
Pan American Games
Silver medal – second place	2015 Toronto	Team

Paul Stanton Sewald (born May 26, 1990) is an American professional baseball pitcher who is a free agent. He has played in Major League Baseball (MLB) for the New York Mets, Seattle Mariners, Arizona Diamondbacks, Cleveland Guardians, Detroit Tigers, and Toronto Blue Jays. Sewald played college baseball for the San Diego Toreros.

== Amateur career ==
Sewald attended Bishop Gorman High School in Las Vegas, Nevada. In 2008, his senior year, he had a 7–0 win–loss record with a 1.57 earned run average (ERA), earning All-State honors.

Undrafted out of high school in the 2008 MLB draft, Sewald enrolled at the University of San Diego and played college baseball for the San Diego Toreros. As a senior in 2012, he pitched to an 8–4 record with a 3.09 ERA in 15 games (14 starts).

== Professional career ==
=== New York Mets ===
The New York Mets selected Sewald in the tenth round, with the 320th overall selection, of the 2012 Major League Baseball draft. They gave him a $1,000 signing bonus. After signing, Sewald made his professional debut that same season with the Brooklyn Cyclones of the Low–A New York-Penn League where he was 0–2 with a 1.88 ERA in 28 2/3 relief innings pitched. He pitched in the 2013 season with the Savannah Sand Gnats of the Single–A South Atlantic League, compiling a 3–2 record and 1.77 ERA in 35 relief appearances.

Sewald began the 2014 season with the St. Lucie Mets of the High–A Florida State League and was promoted to the Binghamton Mets of the Double–A Eastern League during the year. In 43 appearances out of the bullpen between two teams, he was 5–1 with a 1.92 ERA. After the regular season, he played in the Arizona Fall League. In 2015, he played for Binghamton and pitched to a 3–0 record and 1.75 ERA in 44 games. During the season, he pitched for the United States national baseball team at the 2015 Pan American Games, earning a silver medal. In 2016, he played for the Las Vegas 51s of the Triple–A Pacific Coast League where he was 5–3 with a 3.29 ERA in a career high 65 2/3 innings pitched.

On April 8, 2017, the Mets promoted Sewald to the major leagues for the first time. He made his MLB debut the same day against the Miami Marlins at Citi Field and allowed two runs in a third of an inning. He was optioned back to Las Vegas on April 13 and recalled again on May 1. After his recall, he spent the remainder of 2017 with the Mets. In 57 relief appearances for New York, he was 0–6 with a 4.55 ERA and a 1.21 WHIP.

On May 26, 2019, Sewald was designated for assignment by the Mets following the promotion of Rajai Davis. He had his contract selected back to the active roster on August 16.

On September 24, 2019, Sewald earned his first MLB win in a walk-off win against the Miami Marlins, ending his streak of 118 major-league appearances without a win, the second-longest such streak in MLB history. With the win, he also ended his 14-game losing streak, the longest losing streak to start a career in NL history. In 2020, Sewald struggled to a 13.50 ERA over 6.0 innings of work. On December 2, 2020, Sewald was non-tendered by the Mets.

=== Seattle Mariners ===
On January 7, 2021, Sewald signed a minor league contract with the Seattle Mariners organization. Sewald started the 2021 season playing for the Triple-A Tacoma Rainiers, where he initially struggled but found his footing a week into the season, striking out 10 batters in 4 1/3 innings. On May 13, Sewald was selected to the active roster. In his Mariners debut, Sewald earned the win while striking out four batters.

Sewald enjoyed a breakout season with the Mariners in 2021 due in large part to his improved pitch usage. Writing for 710 ESPN Seattle, Brandon Gustafson described him as "a force" and "the biggest surprise star" of Seattle's bullpen. Sewald admitted in an interview with the station that he had exceeded even his own expectations. Sewald had a 10–3 record with an ERA of 3.06 in 62 games and 64 2/3 innings while striking out 104 batters in 2021.

In 2022, Sewald again flourished with the Mariners, posting a record of 5–4 with a 2.67 ERA and 20 saves in 64 innings. In May of that year, Sewald played against the Mets at Citi Field, getting out of a two-runner-on jam in the seventh and working a clean inning against the top of the Mets' lineup in the eighth in a 2–1 win. Sewald would go on to say during post-game interviews that he felt that the Mets "gave up" on him and that it felt nice to "get revenge" on the team.

On January 13, 2023, Sewald agreed to a one-year, $4.1 million contract with the Mariners, avoiding salary arbitration.

=== Arizona Diamondbacks ===
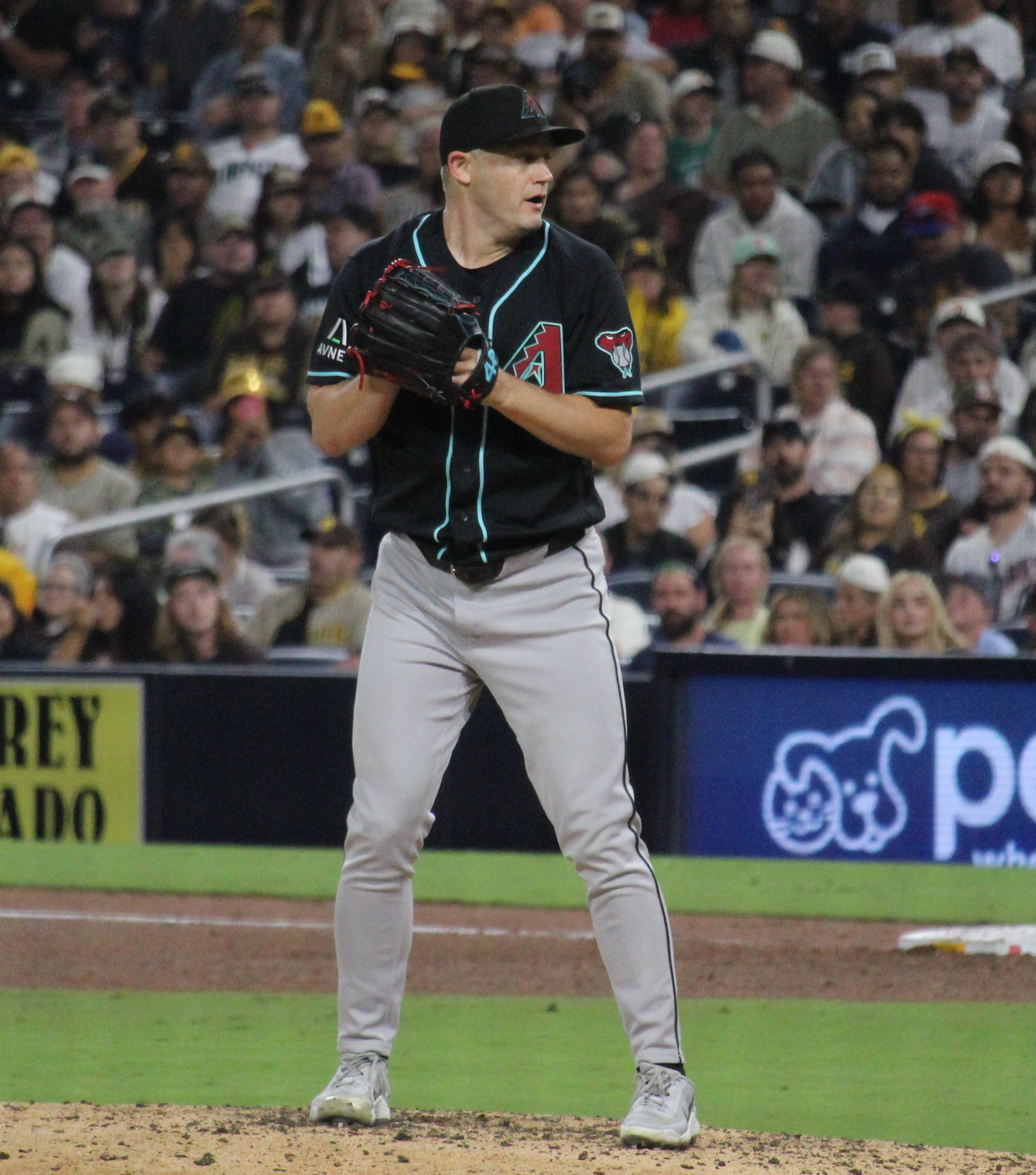
Sewald in 2026

On July 31, 2023, the Mariners traded Sewald to the Arizona Diamondbacks for Ryan Bliss, Dominic Canzone, and Josh Rojas. In 20 regular season appearances for the Diamondbacks, he logged a 3.57 ERA with 20 strikeouts and went 13-for-15 in save opportunities across 17 2/3 innings pitched. Sewald remained as Arizona's closer throughout their postseason run and pitched eight consecutive scoreless playoff appearances en route to the 2023 World Series. In Game 1 against the Texas Rangers, Sewald blew his first save opportunity of the postseason, as he gave up a two-run home run to Corey Seager in the ninth inning as the Diamondbacks went on to lose in extra innings. He did not appear again until Game 5 with the Diamondbacks trailing 1–0 in the top of the ninth inning, surrendering four runs in a non-save situation as they lost the game and the series. Nonetheless, he did tie the postseason record for save opportunities with eight, shared by Robb Nen & Jeurys Familia.

Sewald missed the beginning of the 2024 campaign with an oblique strain and pitched well after returning, going 11–for–11 in save opportunities and posting an 0.54 ERA. On August 2, after multiple blown saves and an inflation of his ERA to 4.23, manager Torey Lovullo announced that Sewald would be removed from the closer's role.

=== Cleveland Guardians ===
On January 22, 2025, Sewald signed a one-year, $7 million contract with the Cleveland Guardians including a mutual option for the 2026 season. In 18 appearances for Cleveland, he posted a 1-1 record and 4.70 ERA with 18 strikeouts and two saves across 15 1/3 innings pitched. On July 15, Sewald was placed on the injured list due to a right shoulder strain.

=== Detroit Tigers ===
On July 31, 2025, Sewald was traded to the Detroit Tigers in exchange for a player to be named later or cash considerations. He was activated from the injured list for his Tigers debut on September 18. In four appearances for Detroit, Sewald recorded a 4.15 ERA with two strikeouts across 4 1/3 innings pitched. The Tigers declined his 2026 option on November 6, making him a free agent.

=== Arizona Diamondbacks (second stint) ===
On February 14, 2026, Sewald signed a one-year, $1.5 million contract to return to the Arizona Diamondbacks. He had a 3.08 ERA through June 14, but then gave up 18 earned runs in his next 12 2/3 innings. Sewald was designated for assignment by Arizona on August 10.

=== Toronto Blue Jays ===
On August 12, 2026, Sewald was claimed off of waivers by the Toronto Blue Jays.

== Personal life ==
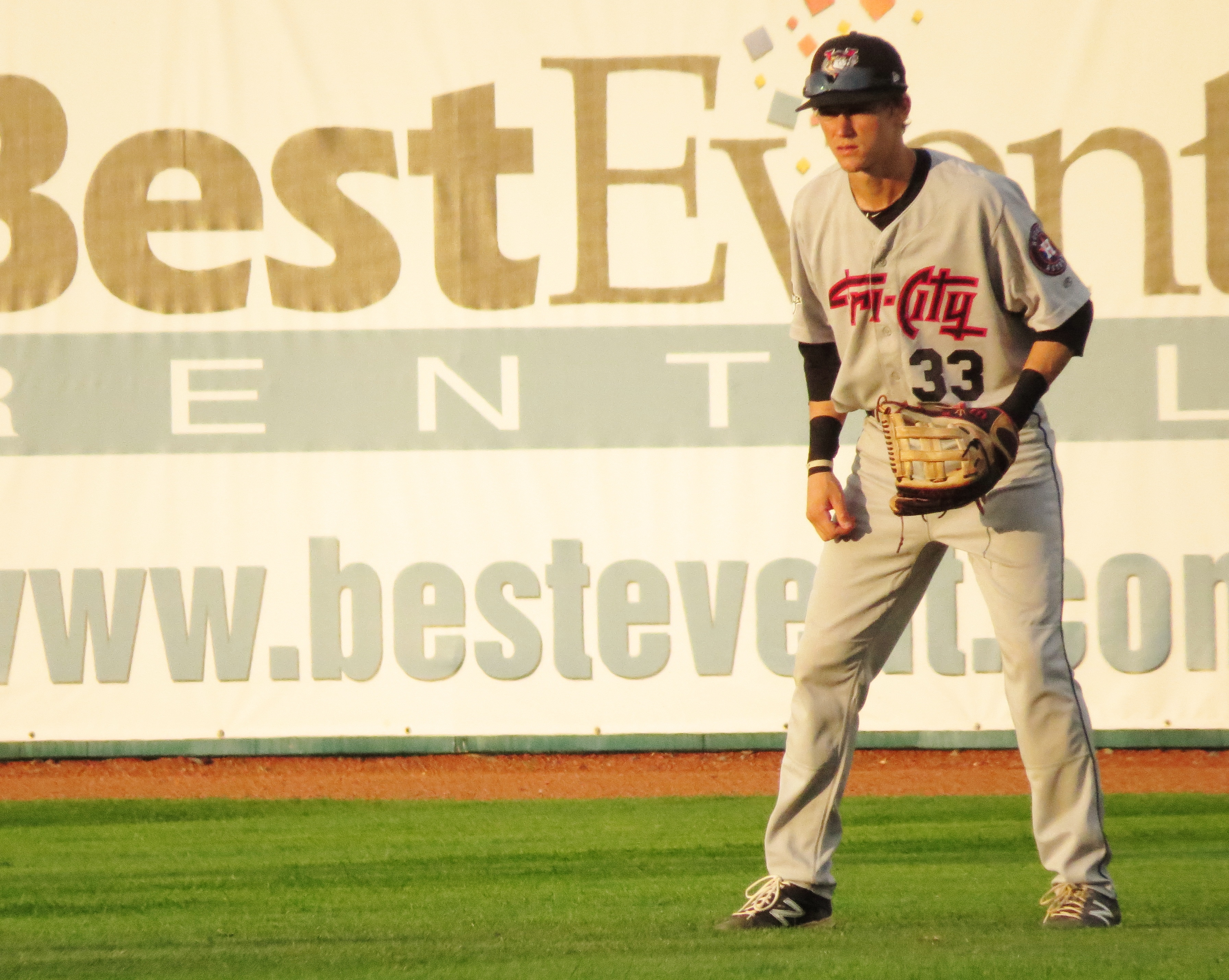
Johnny Sewald playing for the Tri-City ValleyCats in 2015

Sewald's father, Mark, is a former college baseball pitcher who was drafted out of high school by the Boston Red Sox in 1979. Sewald's parents are accountants. He received his bachelor's degree in accounting from the University of San Diego. Sewald's younger brother, Johnny, an outfielder, was selected in the 14th round of the 2015 MLB draft out of Arizona State University by the Houston Astros.

Sewald met his wife, Molly, while he was pitching in the Arizona Fall League and she was at Arizona State University. Their first child, a daughter, was born in August 2021.
