= Dylan Moore =

American baseball player (born 1992)

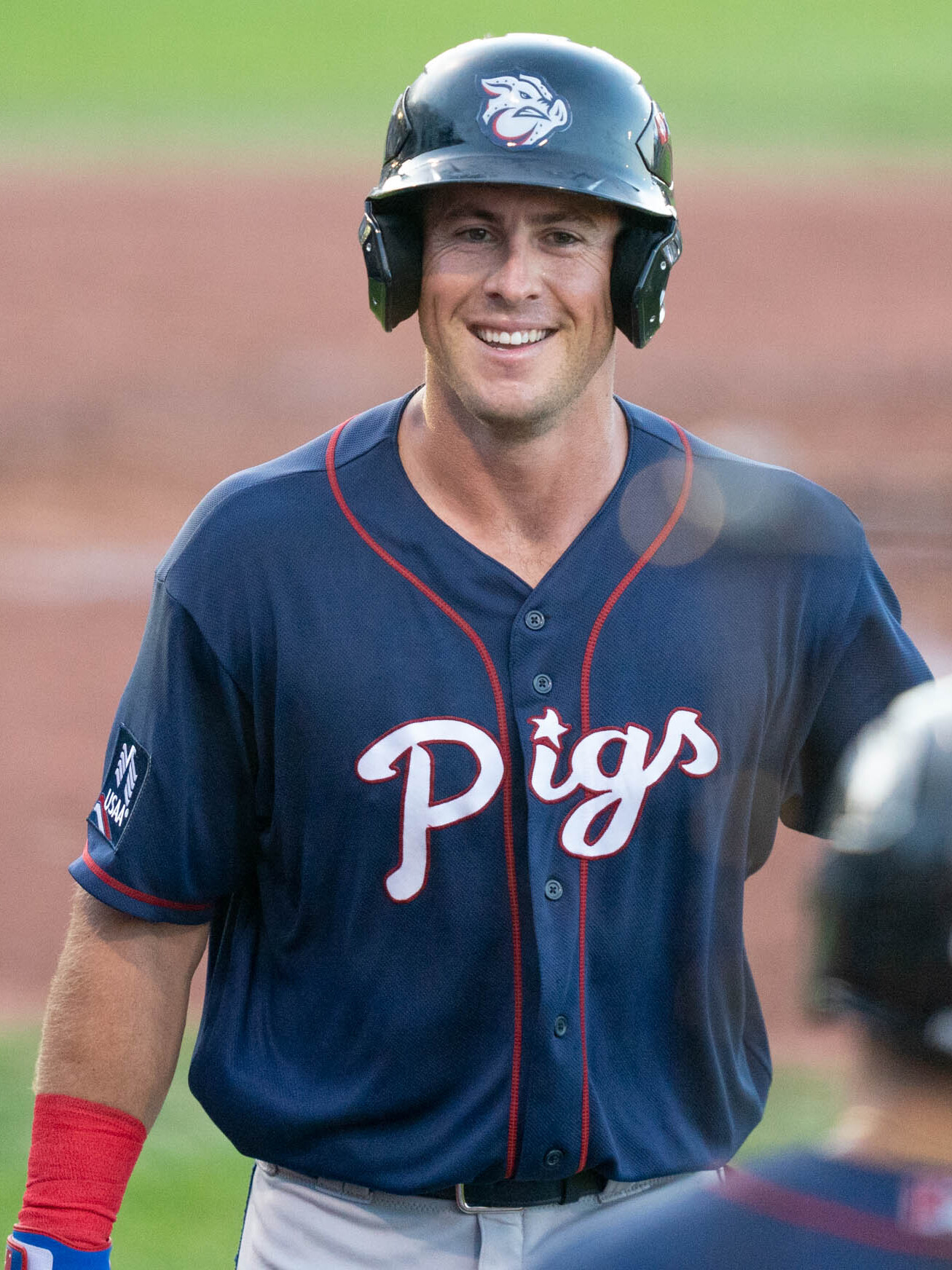
- Moore with the Lehigh Valley IronPigs in 2026

Free agent
- Utility player
- Born: August 2, 1992 (age 34); Yorba Linda, California, U.S.
- Bats: Right Throws: Right

MLB debut
- March 20, 2019, for the Seattle Mariners

MLB statistics (through 2026 season)
- Batting average: .204
- Home runs: 63
- Runs batted in: 198
- Stolen bases: 119
- Stats at Baseball Reference

Teams
- Seattle Mariners (2019–2025); Texas Rangers (2025); Philadelphia Phillies (2026)

Career highlights and awards
- Gold Glove Award (2024)

Dylan Scott Moore (born August 2, 1992), nicknamed "D Mo", is an American professional baseball utility player who is a free agent. He has played in Major League Baseball (MLB) for the Seattle Mariners, Texas Rangers, and Philadelphia Phillies.

== Amateur career ==
Moore attended El Dorado High School in Placentia, California. In his senior season of high school baseball, he hit .446 with nine stolen bases. He then attended Cypress College for two years, before transferring to the University of Central Florida (UCF) for his final two years of college. He led the UCF Knights in hits both years with the team, hitting over .300 in 2014 and 2015, and was named to The American all-conference first team as a shortstop in 2015.

== Professional career ==
=== Texas Rangers ===
The Texas Rangers selected Moore in the seventh round, with the 198th overall pick, of the 2015 MLB draft. Moore signed with the Rangers for a $10,000 bonus and debuted professionally in the summer of 2015 with the Low-A Spokane Indians, moving up to the Single-A Hickory Crawdads for four games in September. He posted a combined batting line of .271/.376/.454 with 7 home runs and 37 RBI in 69 games.

Moore began 2016 back in Hickory, where he hit .244 with 37 stolen bases in 101 games. He was promoted to the High-A High Desert Mavericks in early August.

=== Atlanta Braves ===
On August 24, 2016, Moore was traded to the Atlanta Braves as part of a three-team trade that sent outfielder Jeff Francoeur to the Miami Marlins, with the Rangers receiving international slot bonus money. Moore finished the 2016 season with the High-A Carolina Mudcats. With three minor league teams in 2016, Moore had a combined batting line of .269/.379/.441 with 14 home runs and 42 stolen bases in 128 games. After the regular season, Moore played for the Salt River Rafters of the Arizona Fall League. Moore spent 2017 with the Double-A Mississippi Braves, producing a batting line of .207/.291/.292 with 7 home runs and 42 RBI in 122 games. The Braves released Moore on March 30, 2018.

=== Milwaukee Brewers ===
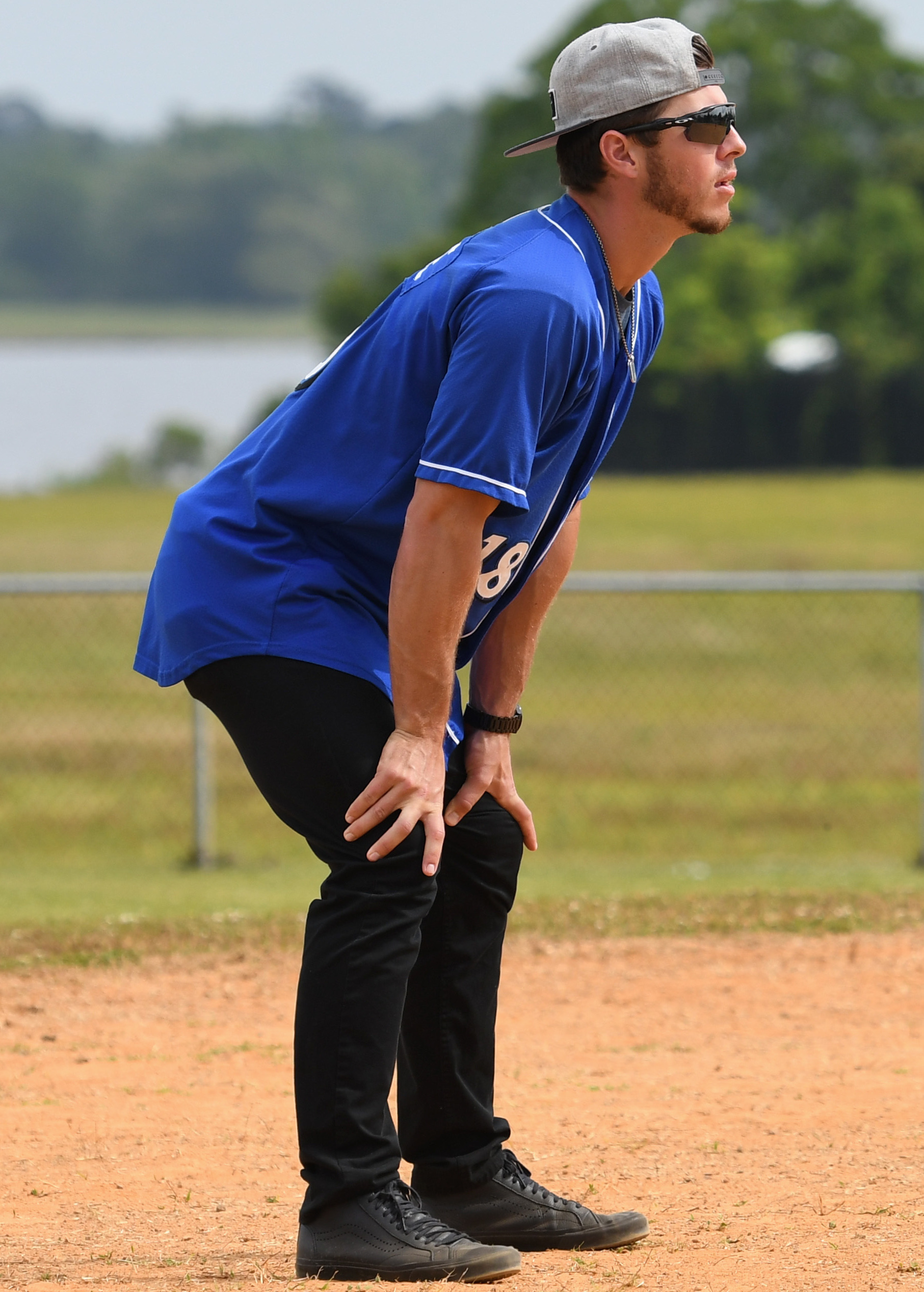
Moore with the Biloxi Shuckers in 2018

On April 6, 2018, Moore signed a minor league contract with the Milwaukee Brewers. Moore started 2018 returning to Double-A, this time with the Biloxi Shuckers, before being promoted to the Triple-A Colorado Springs Sky Sox in May. He hit a combined .299/.363/.522 with 14 home runs and 58 RBI in 121 games and was named a mid-season All-Star with Colorado Springs. Moore elected free agency following the season on November 2.

=== Seattle Mariners ===
On November 9, 2018, the Seattle Mariners signed Moore to a one-year, major league contract. Before the 2019 regular season, Moore played winter league baseball for the Tomateros de Culiacan of the Mexican Pacific League. He was on the Mariners 2019 Opening Day roster, making his MLB debut on March 20 in the Tokyo Dome as a defensive replacement at third base in the seventh inning. Moore drew a walk in his first MLB plate appearance that day, then stole second base. In 113 games in 2019, Moore hit .206 with 9 home runs, 28 RBIs, and 11 stolen bases. His nine caught stealing attempts were the most in his career.

In 2020, Moore became a regular starter for the Mariners. He played a full game at every defensive position except center field (where he played only seven innings), catcher, and pitcher. He also set career highs in batting average, on-base percentage, and slugging, with a slash line of .255/.358/.496. Moore's season ended early, as he was put on the concussion list on September 22 after being hit in the head by a pitch from Brandon Bielek of the Houston Astros.

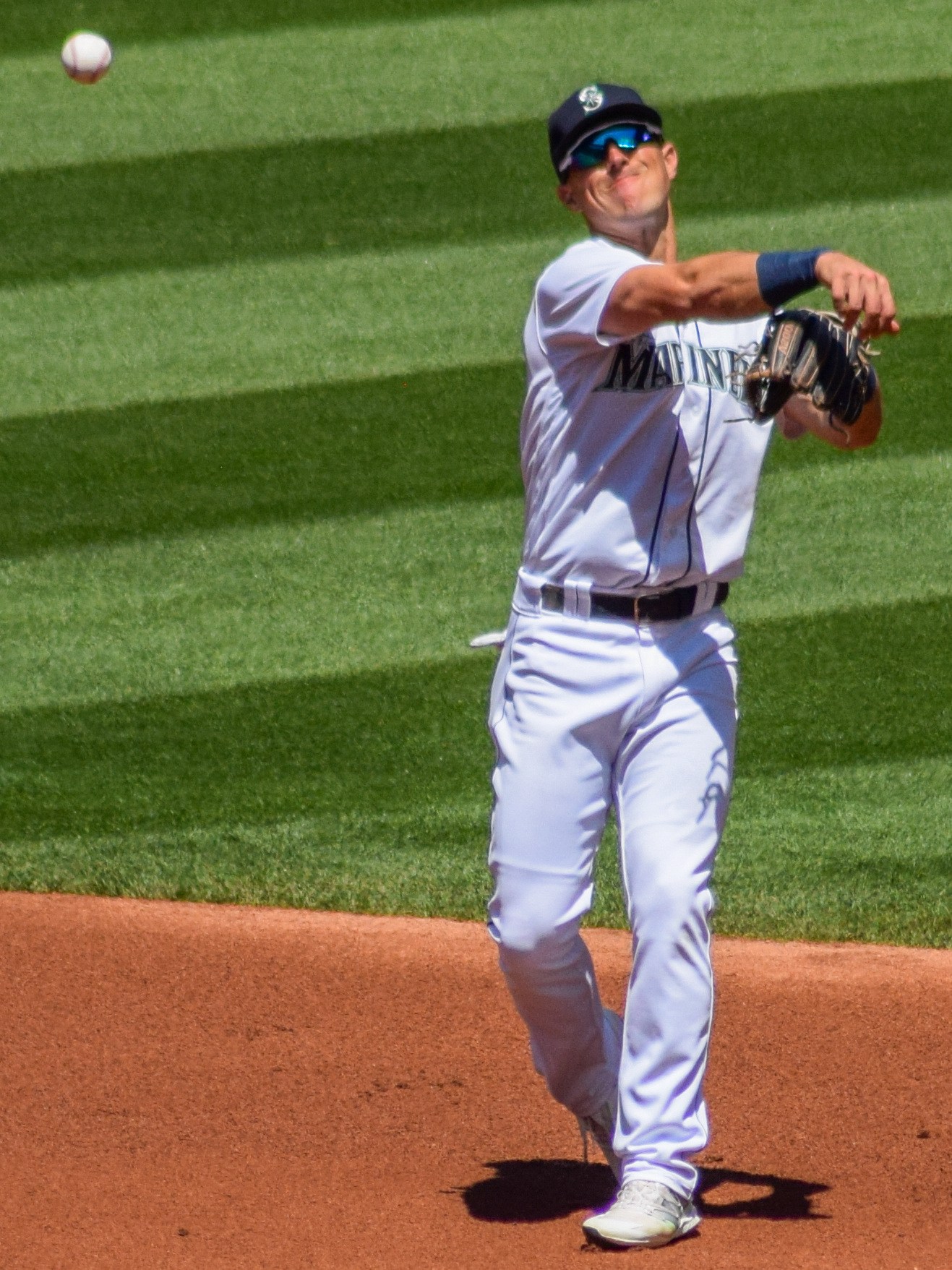
Moore with the Mariners in 2021

On July 26, 2021, Moore hit a 395-foot grand slam in the bottom of the eighth inning to give the Mariners an 11–8 lead over the Astros, which would be the game's final score. The Mariners had completed a comeback win after trailing 7–0 in the fourth inning. This was Seattle's fifth grand slam of 2021 for Seattle and the first of Moore's MLB career. Moore said in mid-2022 that the grand slam was his favorite moment as a player. Following a solid 2020, 2021 was one of the worst offensive seasons of Moore's career, with a slash line of .181/.276/.334 with 12 home runs, 43 RBIs, and 21 stolen bases in 126 games. His 12 home runs were a single-season best.

Moore improved offensively in 2022, with a slash line of .224/.368/.385, good for an OPS+ of 122, with 6 home runs, 24 RBIs, and 21 stolen bases in 104 games. The Mariners made the playoffs for the first time in over two decades. In the postseason, Moore had 1 hit, 2 walks, and 4 strikeouts in 9 plate appearances in three games, starting Game 2 of the American League Division Series.

On February 1, 2023, Moore signed a three-year, $8.875 million contract extension with the Mariners. Moore started the 2023 season on the injured list with an oblique strain, not joining the club until June. He started slowly, with a batting average of .037 after one month with the team. He turned things around, with a two-home run game against the Minnesota Twins on July 26, and showed more power in the second half of the season. A cool September lowered his season line to .207/.303/.428 in 67 games, his fewest since the shortened 2020 season.

Moore got the most playing time of his career in 2024 and continued to combine defensive versatility with league-average offense dragged down by a low batting average. He hit .201/.320/.367 with a career-high 32 stolen bases and 123 strikeouts in 135 games. He primarily played shortstop for the first season in his career, filling in for the injured J.P. Crawford. He also played more than 20 games at third base, second base, and left field. Moore won the Gold Glove Award as a utility player. Moore became the longest-tenured Mariner on the team in 2024, following the trade of pitcher Marco Gonzales in the offseason.

Moore was named the AL Player of the Week on April 21. He batted .385 with three home runs, five RBIs, a double, and three stolen bases in 6 games to win the award. He went on the injured list on April 26 with a hip inflammation. While Moore hit well before the injury, after his return in May, he batted .139 over the next four months with the Mariners. In 88 games for Seattle in 2025, Moore hit .193/.263/.359 with nine home runs, 19 RBI, and 12 stolen bases. On August 23, Moore, at that time the longest-tenured Mariner, was designated for assignment following Víctor Robles' activation from the injured list. Seattle released Moore after he cleared waivers the following day.

=== Texas Rangers (second stint) ===
On August 26, 2025, Moore signed a minor league contract with the Texas Rangers. Two days later, the Rangers added him to their active roster. In 18 games with Texas, he batted .259/.300/.481 with two home runs and two stolen bases.

=== Philadelphia Phillies ===
On January 30, 2026, Moore signed a minor league contract with the Philadelphia Phillies. After triggering the opt-out clause in his contract, the Phillies signed Moore to a major league contract on March 21. In 13 appearances for Philadelphia, he went 0-for-12 with one stolen base and three walks. On May 2, Moore was designated for assignment by the Phillies. He cleared waivers and was sent outright to the Triple-A Lehigh Valley IronPigs on May 8.

== Personal life ==
Moore and his wife have three children, born in 2016, 2020 (while Moore was on the injured list), and 2024 (while Moore was on the paternity list).

As a child, Moore was a fan of the Anaheim Angels, and his favorite baseball memory was the Angels winning the 2002 World Series. His favorite player on that team was David Eckstein.
