= 2022 Tampa Bay Rays season =

2022 Tampa Bay Rays
- American League Wild Card
- League: American League
- Division: East
- Ballpark: Tropicana Field
- City: St. Petersburg, Florida
- Record: 86–76 (.531)
- Divisional place: 3rd
- Owners: Stuart Sternberg
- President: Brian Auld & Matthew Silverman
- President of baseball operations: Erik Neander
- General manager: Peter Bendix
- Manager: Kevin Cash
- Television: Bally Sports Sun; Bally Sports Florida (Dewayne Staats, Brian Anderson)
- Radio: Tampa Bay Rays Radio Network (English) (Andy Freed, Dave Wills); WGES (Spanish) (Ricardo Taveras, Enrique Oliu)

The 2022 Tampa Bay Rays season was the 25th season of the Tampa Bay Rays franchise and their 15th as the Rays. The Rays played their home games at Tropicana Field as members of Major League Baseball's American League East.

On December 2, 2021, Commissioner of Baseball Rob Manfred announced a lockout of players, following expiration of the collective bargaining agreement (CBA) between the league and the Major League Baseball Players Association (MLBPA). On March 10, 2022, MLB and the MLBPA agreed to a new collective bargaining agreement, thus ending the lockout. Opening Day was played on April 7. Although MLB previously announced that several series would be canceled due to the lockout, the agreement provided for a 162-game season, with originally canceled games to be made up via doubleheaders.

The Rays finished in third place in their division, qualifying for the playoffs as the final wild card in the American League. They lost to the Cleveland Guardians in a two-game sweep in the American League Wild Card Series.

== Offseason ==
=== Lockout ===
The expiration of the league's collective bargaining agreement (CBA) with the Major League Baseball Players Association occurred on December 1, 2021, with no new agreement in place. As a result, the team owners voted unanimously to lockout the players stopping all free agency and trades.

The parties came to an agreement on a new CBA on March 10, 2022.

=== Rule changes ===
Pursuant to the new CBA, several new rules were instituted for the 2022 season. The National League will adopt the designated hitter full-time, a draft lottery will be implemented, the postseason will expand from ten teams to twelve, and advertising patches will appear on player uniforms and helmets for the first time.

== Season standings ==
=== American League East ===
AL East
Team	W	L	Pct.	GB	Home	Road
New York Yankees	99	63	.611	—	57‍–‍24	42‍–‍39
Toronto Blue Jays	92	70	.568	7	47‍–‍34	45‍–‍36
Tampa Bay Rays	86	76	.531	13	51‍–‍30	35‍–‍46
Baltimore Orioles	83	79	.512	16	45‍–‍36	38‍–‍43
Boston Red Sox	78	84	.481	21	43‍–‍38	35‍–‍46

=== American League Wild Card ===
Division leaders
Team	W	L	Pct.
Houston Astros	106	56	.654
New York Yankees	99	63	.611
Cleveland Guardians	92	70	.568

Wild Card teams (Top 3 teams qualify for postseason)
Team	W	L	Pct.	GB
Toronto Blue Jays	92	70	.568	+6
Seattle Mariners	90	72	.556	+4
Tampa Bay Rays	86	76	.531	—
Baltimore Orioles	83	79	.512	3
Chicago White Sox	81	81	.500	5
Minnesota Twins	78	84	.481	8
Boston Red Sox	78	84	.481	8
Los Angeles Angels	73	89	.451	13
Texas Rangers	68	94	.420	18
Detroit Tigers	66	96	.407	20
Kansas City Royals	65	97	.401	21
Oakland Athletics	60	102	.370	26

=== Record against opponents ===
2022 American League record Source: MLB Standings Grid – 2022
Team	BAL	BOS	CWS	CLE	DET	HOU	KC	LAA	MIN	NYY	OAK	SEA	TB	TEX	TOR	NL
Baltimore	—	9–10	5–2	3–3	1–5	4–3	4–3	6–1	3–4	7–12	3–4	2–4	9–10	6–0	9–10	12–8
Boston	10–9	—	2–4	5–2	5–1	4–2	3–4	4–3	3–4	6–13	5–1	6–1	7–12	6–1	3–16	9–11
Chicago	2–5	4–2	—	7–12	12–7	3–4	9–10	3–4	9–10	3–4	5–2	4–2	4–2	3–4	2–4	11–9
Cleveland	3–3	2–5	12–7	—	10–9	3–4	12–7	3–4	13–6	1–5	6–1	1–6	4–2	5–1	5–2	12–8
Detroit	5–1	1–5	7–12	9–10	—	0–7	10–9	3–3	8–11	1–5	2–5	1–6	2–5	4–3	2–5	11–9
Houston	3–4	2–4	4–3	4–3	7–0	—	5–2	13–6	6–0	5–2	12–7	12–7	5–1	14–5	2–4	12–8
Kansas City	3–4	4–3	10–9	7–12	9–10	2–5	—	3–3	7–12	1–6	3–3	2–4	3–4	2–4	2–5	7–13
Los Angeles	1–6	3–4	4–3	4–3	3–3	6–13	3–3	—	4–2	2–4	12–7	10–9	2–5	9–10	3–4	7–13
Minnesota	4–3	4–3	10–9	6–13	11–8	0–6	12–7	2–4	—	2–5	5–1	4–3	4–2	2–5	4–3	8–12
New York	12–7	13–6	4–3	5–1	5–1	2–5	6–1	4–2	5–2	—	5–2	2–4	11–8	4–3	11–8	10–10
Oakland	4–3	1–5	2–5	1–6	5–2	7–12	3–3	7–12	1–5	2–5	—	8–11	3–4	8–11	3–3	5–15
Seattle	4–2	1–6	2–4	6–1	6–1	7–12	4–2	9–10	3–4	4–2	11–8	—	2–5	14–5	5–2	12–8
Tampa Bay	10–9	12–7	2–4	2–4	5–2	1–5	4–3	5–2	2–4	8–11	4–3	5–2	—	4–3	10–9	12–8
Texas	0–6	1–6	4–3	1–5	3–4	5–14	4–2	10–9	5–2	3–4	11–8	5–14	3–4	—	2–4	11–9
Toronto	10–9	16–3	4–2	2–5	5–2	4–2	5–2	4–3	3–4	8–11	3–3	2–5	9–10	4–2	—	13–7

Updated with the results of all games through October 5, 2022.

== Game log ==
=== Regular season ===
Legend
	Rays win
	Rays loss
	Postponement
**Bold**	Rays team member

2022 Game Log: 86–76 (Home: 51–30; Away: 35–46)
April: 12–9 (Home: 9–6; Away: 3–3)

#	Date	Opponent	Score	Win	Loss	Save	Attendance	Record	Streak/Recap
1	April 8	Orioles	2–1	**Kittredge** (1–0)	López (0–1)	**Raley** (1)	25,025	1–0	W1
2	April 9	Orioles	5–3	**Fleming** (1–0)	Lyles (0–1)	**Kittredge** (1)	15,615	2–0	W2
3	April 10	Orioles	8–0	**Springs** (1–0)	Wells (0–1)	—	14,100	3–0	W3
4	April 11	Athletics	2–13	Blackburn (1–0)	**Patiño** (0–1)	—	9,139	3–1	L1
5	April 12	Athletics	9–8 (10)	**Thompson** (1–0)	Trivino (0–1)	—	7,588	4–1	W1
6	April 13	Athletics	2–4	Montas (1–1)	**McClanahan** (0–1)	Trivino (1)	8,954	4–2	L1
7	April 14	Athletics	3–6	Irvin (1–1)	**Fleming** (1–1)	Jiménez (1)	8,287	4–3	L2
8	April 15	@ White Sox	2–3	Cease (2–0)	**Rasmussen** (0–1)	Hendriks (3)	19,009	4–4	L3
9	April 16	@ White Sox	2–3	López (2–0)	**Thompson** (1–1)	Hendriks (4)	27,113	4–5	L4
10	April 17	@ White Sox	9–3	**Mazza** (1–0)	Velasquez (0–1)	—	17,798	5–5	W1
11	April 18	@ Cubs	2–4	Thompson (2–0)	**Adam** (0–1)	Robertson (4)	26,615	5–6	L1
12	April 19	@ Cubs	6–5	**Fleming** (2–1)	Steele (1–1)	**Kittredge** (2)	26,568	6–6	W1
13	April 20	@ Cubs	8–2 (6)	**Beeks** (1–0)	Stroman (0–2)	—	26,167	7–6	W2
14	April 22	Red Sox	3–4	Wacha (1–0)	**Kluber** (0–1)	Barnes (1)	16,902	7–7	L1
15	April 23	Red Sox	3–2 (10)	**Wisler** (1–0)	Robles (1–1)	—	19,137	8–7	W1
16	April 24	Red Sox	5–2	**McClanahan** (1–1)	Valdéz (0–1)	**Thompson** (1)	20,993	9–7	W2
17	April 26	Mariners	4–8	Gilbert (3–0)	**Fleming** (2–2)	—	9,257	9–8	L1
18	April 27	Mariners	3–2	**Rasmussen** (1–1)	Gonzales (1–2)	**Kittredge** (3)	7,290	10–8	W1
19	April 28	Mariners	2–1	**Feyereisen** (1–0)	Flexen (1–3)	**Thompson** (2)	6,749	11–8	W2
20	April 29	Twins	6–1	**Kluber** (1–1)	Bundy (3–1)	—	9,928	12–8	W3
21	April 30	Twins	1–9	Stashak (2–0)	**McClanahan** (1–2)	—	18,846	12–9	L1

May: 16–12 (Home: 8–5; Away: 8–7)

#	Date	Opponent	Score	Win	Loss	Save	Attendance	Record	Streak/Recap
22	May 1	Twins	3–9	Winder (1–0)	**Fleming** (2–3)	—	14,830	12–10	L2
23	May 2	@ Athletics	6–1	**Rasmussen** (2–1)	Jefferies (1–4)	—	2,488	13–10	W1
24	May 3	@ Athletics	10–7 (10)	**Kittredge** (2–0)	Trivino (0–2)	—	2,815	14–10	W2
25	May 4	@ Athletics	3–0	**Feyereisen** (2–0)	Jackson (0–1)	**Kittredge** (4)	4,838	15–10	W3
26	May 5	@ Mariners	4–3	**McClanahan** (2–2)	Ray (2–3)	**Raley** (2)	17,027	16–10	W4
27	May 6	@ Mariners	8–7	**Thompson** (2–1)	Sewald (0–1)	**Raley** (3)	26,154	17–10	W5
28	May 7	@ Mariners	8–2	**Rasmussen** (3–1)	Gonzales (1–4)	—	31,589	18–10	W6
29	May 8	@ Mariners	1–2 (10)	Sewald (1–1)	**Wisler** (1–1)	—	32,501	18–11	L1
30	May 9	@ Angels	3–11	Syndergaard (3–1)	**Springs** (1–1)	—	19,537	18–12	L2
31	May 10	@ Angels	0–12	Detmers (2–1)	**Kluber** (1–2)	—	39,313	18–13	L3
32	May 11	@ Angels	4–2 (10)	**Feyereisen** (3–0)	Loup (0–2)	**Raley** (4)	21,045	19–13	W1
33	May 13	Blue Jays	5–2	**Kittredge** (3–0)	Gausman (3–2)	**Adam** (1)	10,169	20–13	W2
34	May 14	Blue Jays	1–5	Mayza (2–0)	**Thompson** (1–2)	—	15,195	20–14	L1
35	May 15	Blue Jays	3–0	**Wisler** (2–1)	Manoah (4–1)	**Kittredge** (5)	20,832	21–14	W1
36	May 16	Tigers	2–3	Fulmer (2–2)	**Kittredge** (3–1)	Soto (6)	11,532	21–15	L1
37	May 17	Tigers	8–1	**McClanahan** (3–2)	Brieske (0–3)	—	8,475	22–15	W1
38	May 18	Tigers	6–1	**Rasmussen** (4–1)	Rodríguez (1–3)	—	9,706	23–15	W2
39	May 20	@ Orioles	6–8 (13)	Vespi (1–0)	**Garza Jr.** (0–1)	—	15,127	23–16	L1
40	May 21	@ Orioles	6–1	**Springs** (2–1)	Bradish (1–3)	—	17,573	24–16	W1
41	May 22	@ Orioles	6–7 (11)	Pérez (2–0)	**Knight** (0–1)	—	23,778	24–17	L1
42	May 24	Marlins	4–0	**McClanahan** (4–2)	López (4–2)	—	9,006	25–17	W1
43	May 25	Marlins	5–4	**Rasmussen** (5–1)	Poteet (0–1)	**Poche** (1)	7,520	26–17	W2
44	May 26	Yankees	2–7	Cortés Jr. (4–1)	**Yarbrough** (0–1)	—	14,610	26–18	L1
45	May 27	Yankees	0–2	Taillon (5–1)	**Springs** (2–2)	Holmes (6)	19,018	26–19	L2
46	May 28	Yankees	3–1	**Feyereisen** (4–0)	Luetge (1–2)	**Poche** (2)	25,025	27–19	W1
47	May 29	Yankees	4–2	**McClanahan** (5–2)	Severino (3–1)	**Feyereisen** (1)	25,025	28–19	W2
48	May 30	@ Rangers	5–9	Otto (3–2)	**Rasmussen** (5–2)	—	25,605	28–20	L1
49	May 31	@ Rangers	0–3	Pérez (4–2)	**Yarbrough** (0–2)	Barlow (9)	16,317	28–21	L2

June: 12–13 (Home: 8–6; Away: 4–7)

#	Date	Opponent	Score	Win	Loss	Save	Attendance	Record	Streak/Recap
50	June 1	@ Rangers	4–3 (11)	**Poche** (1–0)	Santana (2–2)	**Wisler** (1)	20,634	29–21	W1
51	June 2	@ Rangers	3–1	**Kluber** (2–2)	Hearn (3–4)	**Thompson** (3)	17,097	30–21	W2
52	June 3	White Sox	6–3	**McClanahan** (6–2)	Martin (0–2)	**Poche** (3)	8,930	31–21	W3
53	June 4	White Sox	2–3	Crick (2–0)	**Beeks** (1–1)	Hendriks (15)	19,452	31–22	L1
54	June 5	White Sox	5–6	Giolito (4–2)	**Yarbrough** (0–3)	Hendriks (16)	11,162	31–23	L2
55	June 7	Cardinals	4–2 (10)	**Poche** (2–0)	VerHagen (3–1)	—	10,905	32–23	W1
56	June 8	Cardinals	11–3	**Kluber** (3–2)	Naughton (0–2)	—	12,906	33–23	W2
57	June 9	Cardinals	2–1	**McClanahan** (7–2)	Mikolas (4–4)	**Adam** (2)	14,892	34–23	W3
58	June 10	@ Twins	4–9	Smeltzer (3–0)	**Rasmussen** (5–3)	—	23,761	34–24	L1
59	June 11	@ Twins	5–6	Megill (2–1)	**Baz** (0–1)	Pagán (8)	22,741	34–25	L2
60	June 12	@ Twins	6–0	**Springs** (3–2)	Sands (0–3)	—	25,350	35–25	W1
61	June 14	@ Yankees	0–2	Cole (6–1)	**Kluber** (3–3)	Holmes (10)	35,692	35–26	L1
62	June 15	@ Yankees	3–4	Cortés Jr. (6–2)	**McClanahan** (7–3)	Holmes (11)	35,104	35–27	L2
63	June 16	@ Yankees	1–2	King (4–1)	**Armstrong** (0–1)	—	39,469	35–28	L3
64	June 17	@ Orioles	0–1	Bautista (3–2)	**Faucher** (0–1)	López (10)	13,140	35–29	L4
65	June 18	@ Orioles	7–6	**Faucher** (1–1)	Tate (0–3)	**Poche** (4)	15,426	36–29	W1
66	June 19	@ Orioles	1–2	Vespi (2–0)	**Kluber** (3–4)	López (11)	23,004	36–30	L1
67	June 20	Yankees	2–4	Holmes (5–0)	**Adam** (0–2)	Peralta (2)	16,504	36–31	L2
68	June 21	Yankees	5–4	**Armstrong** (1–1)	Cortés Jr. (6–3)	**Poche** (5)	20,688	37–31	W1
69	June 22	Yankees	4–5	Schmidt (4–2)	**Garza Jr.** (0–2)	Holmes (12)	12,264	37–32	L1
70	June 24	Pirates	4–3 (10)	**Adam** (1–2)	De Los Santos (0–1)	—	10,542	38–32	W1
71	June 25	Pirates	6–5	**Garza Jr.** (1–2)	Bednar (3–2)	—	15,203	39–32	W2
72	June 26	Pirates	4–2	**McClanahan** (8–3)	Beede (0–1)	**Raley** (4)	13,364	40–32	W3
73	June 28	Brewers	3–5	Woodruff (6–3)	**Wisler** (2–2)	Hader (23)	13,742	40–33	L1
74	June 29	Brewers	3–5	Boxberger (2–1)	**Faucher** (1–2)	Hader (24)	15,481	40–34	L2
75	June 30	@ Blue Jays	1–4	Kikuchi (3–4)	**Yarbrough** (0–4)	Cimber (4)	22,987	40–35	L3

July: 14–13 (Home: 7–3; Away: 7–10)

#	Date	Opponent	Score	Win	Loss	Save	Attendance	Record	Streak/Recap
76	July 1	@ Blue Jays	2–9	Berríos (6–4)	**Kluber** (3–5)	—	44,445	40–36	L4
77	July 2 (1)	@ Blue Jays	6–2	**McClanahan** (9–3)	Lawrence (0–1)	—	39,426	41–36	W1
78	July 2 (2)	@ Blue Jays	11–5	**Garza Jr.** (2–2)	Hatch (0–1)	—	24,180	42–36	W2
79	July 3	@ Blue Jays	7–3	**Baz** (1–1)	Stripling (4–3)	**Adam** (3)	35,757	43–36	W3
80	July 4	@ Red Sox	0–4	Crawford (2–2)	**Fleming** (2–4)	Schreiber (3)	36,473	43–37	L1
81	July 5	@ Red Sox	8–4	**Thompson** (2–2)	Pivetta (8–6)	—	31,113	44–37	W1
82	July 6	@ Red Sox	7–1	**Kluber** (4–5)	Bello (0–1)	—	33,735	45–37	W2
83	July 8	@ Reds	1–2 (10)	Kuhnel (1–1)	**Wisler** (2–3)	—	26,529	45–38	L1
84	July 9	@ Reds	4–5 (10)	Hoffman (2–0)	**Faucher** (1–3)	—	33,927	45–39	L2
85	July 10	@ Reds	5–10	Lodolo (2–2)	**Baz** (1–2)	—	21,748	45–40	L3
86	July 11	Red Sox	10–5	**Bard** (1–0)	Diekman (4–1)	—	10,629	46–40	W1
87	July 12	Red Sox	3–2	**Kluber** (5–5)	Strahm (3–3)	**Raley** (5)	10,653	47–40	W2
88	July 13	Red Sox	4–1	**McClanahan** (10–3)	Winckowski (3–4)	**Poche** (6)	10,548	48–40	W3
89	July 14	Red Sox	5–4	**Romero** (1–0)	Schreiber (2–1)	**Beeks** (1)	11,998	49–40	W4
90	July 15	Orioles	5–4	**Wisler** (3–3)	Wells (7–5)	**Raley** (6)	13,917	50–40	W5
91	July 16	Orioles	4–6 (11)	López (4–5)	**Bard** (1–1)	Krehbiel (1)	19,886	50–41	L1
92	July 17	Orioles	7–5	**Kluber** (6–5)	Lyles (6–8)	**Adam** (4)	13,813	51–41	W1
**92nd All-Star Game in Los Angeles**
93	July 22	@ Royals	7–3	**Rasmussen** (6–3)	Keller (5–10)	—	22,102	52–41	W2
94	July 23	@ Royals	3–6	Barlow (4–2)	**Yarbrough** (0–5)	—	20,668	52–42	L1
95	July 24	@ Royals	2–4	Bubic (2–6)	**Raley** (1–1)	Clarke (2)	12,336	52–43	L2
96	July 25	@ Orioles	1–5	Vespi (3–0)	**Kluber** (6–6)	—	9,606	52–44	L3
97	July 26	@ Orioles	3–5	Akin (2–1)	**Poche** (2–1)	López (19)	11,307	52–45	L4
98	July 27	@ Orioles	6–4 (10)	**Poche** (3–1)	López (4–6)	**Fairbanks** (1)	13,592	53–45	W1
99	July 28	@ Orioles	0–3	Lyles (7–8)	**Yarbrough** (0–6)	Bautista (3)	16,784	53–46	L1
100	July 29	Guardians	1–4	Bieber (5–6)	**Springs** (3–3)	Clase (22)	14,671	53–47	L2
101	July 30	Guardians	6–4	**Kluber** (7–6)	Plesac (2–9)	**Fairbanks** (2)	22,756	54–47	W1
102	July 31	Guardians	3–5	McCarty (2–2)	**McClanahan** (10–4)	Clase (23)	18,023	54–48	L1

August: 18–9 (Home: 10–3; Away: 8–6)

#	Date	Opponent	Score	Win	Loss	Save	Attendance	Record	Streak/Recap
103	August 2	Blue Jays	1–3	Gausman (8–8)	**Rasmussen** (6–4)	Romano (25)	16,433	54–49	L2
104	August 3	Blue Jays	3–2	**Thompson** (3–2)	Cimber (8–4)	**Adam** (5)	14,253	55–49	W1
105	August 4	@ Tigers	6–2	**Springs** (4–3)	Hutchison (1–5)	—	16,595	56–49	W2
106	August 5	@ Tigers	5–3	**Beeks** (2–1)	Jiménez (3–1)	**Poche** (7)	21,547	57–49	W3
107	August 6	@ Tigers	1–9	Hill (2–3)	**McClanahan** (10–5)	—	40,101	57–50	L1
108	August 7	@ Tigers	7–0	**Poche** (4–1)	Soto (2–6)	—	18,395	58–50	W1
109	August 9	@ Brewers	3–5	Peralta (4–2)	**Yarbrough** (0–7)	Bush (2)	30,030	58–51	L1
110	August 10	@ Brewers	3–4 (10)	Williams (3–2)	**Thompson** (3–3)	—	30,644	58–52	L2
111	August 12	Orioles	3–10	Voth (3–1)	**Kluber** (7–7)	—	12,380	58–53	L3
112	August 13	Orioles	8–2	**McClanahan** (11–5)	Hall (0–1)	—	16,823	59–53	W1
113	August 14	Orioles	4–1	**Rasmussen** (7–4)	Lyles (9–9)	**Adam** (6)	18,093	60–53	W2
114	August 15	@ Yankees	4–0	**Yarbrough** (1–7)	Cole (9–5)	—	42,192	61–53	W3
115	August 16	@ Yankees	3–1	**Springs** (5–3)	Cortés Jr. (9–4)	**Adam** (7)	41,083	62–53	W4
116	August 17	@ Yankees	7–8 (10)	Chapman (2–3)	**Beeks** (2–2)	—	42,512	62–54	L1
117	August 18	Royals	7–1	**Patiño** (1–1)	Castillo (0–1)	—	8,169	63–54	W1
118	August 19	Royals	2–3 (10)	Barlow (5–4)	**Beeks** (2–3)	—	10,049	63–55	L1
119	August 20	Royals	5–2	**Rasmussen** (8–4)	Bubic (2–8)	**Fairbanks** (3)	19,800	64–55	W1
120	August 21	Royals	3–2	**Armstrong** (2–1)	Cuas (2–2)	**Fairbanks** (4)	12,940	65–55	W2
121	August 22	Angels	2–1	**Springs** (6–3)	Davidson (2–4)	**Armstrong** (1)	9,942	66–55	W3
122	August 23	Angels	11–1	**Kluber** (8–7)	Suárez (4–6)	—	8,810	67–55	W4
123	August 24	Angels	4–3 (11)	**Chargois** (1–0)	Barría (2–3)	—	9,763	68–55	W5
124	August 25	Angels	8–3	**Rasmussen** (9–4)	Sandoval (4–9)	—	10,733	69–55	W6
125	August 26	@ Red Sox	8–9	Wacha (9–1)	**Yarbrough** (1–8)	Whitlock (6)	30,095	69–56	L1
126	August 27	@ Red Sox	1–5	Hill (6–5)	**Springs** (6–4)	Schreiber (5)	34,036	69–57	L2
127	August 28	@ Red Sox	12–4	**Kluber** (9–7)	Pivetta (9–10)	—	29,116	70–57	W1
128	August 30	@ Marlins	7–2	**Chargois** (2–0)	Luzardo (3–6)	—	7,386	71–57	W2
129	August 31	@ Marlins	2–1 (10)	**Adam** (2–2)	Nance (0–2)	**Beeks** (2)	7,420	72–57	W3

September: 14–14 (Home: 9–7; Away: 5–7)

#	Date	Opponent	Score	Win	Loss	Save	Attendance	Record	Streak/Recap
130	September 2	Yankees	9–0	**Springs** (7–4)	Germán (2–3)	—	17,886	73–57	W4
131	September 3	Yankees	2–1	**Kluber** (10–7)	Schmidt (5–4)	**Adam** (8)	21,754	74–57	W5
132	September 4	Yankees	1–2	Montas (5–11)	**Armstrong** (2–2)	Holmes (18)	25,025	74–58	L1
133	September 5	Red Sox	4–3	**Faucher** (2–3)	Familia (2–2)	**Fairbanks** (5)	12,264	75–58	W1
134	September 6	Red Sox	8–4	**Cleavinger** (1–1)	Hill (6–6)	—	8,069	76–58	W2
135	September 7	Red Sox	1–0	**Chirinos** (1–0)	Pivetta (9–11)	**Fairbanks** (6)	8,696	77–58	W3
136	September 9	@ Yankees	4–2	**Rasmussen** (10–4)	Montas (5–12)	**Armstrong** (2)	46,160	78–58	W4
137	September 10	@ Yankees	3–10	Taillon (13–4)	**Kluber** (10–8)	—	43,088	78–59	L1
138	September 11	@ Yankees	4–10	Peralta (3–4)	**Patiño** (1–2)	—	36,402	78–60	L2
139	September 12	@ Blue Jays	2–3	Mayza (7–0)	**Adam** (2–3)	Romano (33)	23,002	78–61	L3
140	September 13 (1)	@ Blue Jays	4–2	**Springs** (8–4)	Merryweather (0–3)	**Fairbanks** (7)	23,497	79–61	W1
141	September 13 (2)	@ Blue Jays	2–7	Bass (4–3)	**Poche** (4–2)	—	25,103	79–62	L1
142	September 14	@ Blue Jays	1–5	Stripling (8–4)	**Rasmussen** (10–5)	—	24,282	79–63	L2
143	September 15	@ Blue Jays	11–0	**McClanahan** (12–5)	Gausman (12–10)	—	23,820	80–63	W1
144	September 16	Rangers	3–4	Pérez (12–6)	**Kluber** (10–9)	Leclerc (6)	14,127	80–64	L1
145	September 17	Rangers	5–1	**Yarbrough** (2–8)	Gray (7–7)	—	14,094	81–64	W1
146	September 18	Rangers	5–3	**Springs** (9–4)	Otto (6–9)	**Fairbanks** (8)	12,835	82–64	W2
147	September 19	Astros	0–4	García (13–8)	**Rasmussen** (10–6)	—	10,390	82–65	L1
148	September 20	Astros	0–5	Javier (10–9)	**McClanahan** (12–6)	Pressly (29)	8,992	82–66	L2
149	September 21	Astros	2–5	McCullers Jr. (4–1)	**Raley** (1–2)	Pressly (30)	9,293	82–67	L3
150	September 22	Blue Jays	10–5	**Yarbrough** (3–8)	Berríos (11–6)	—	8,799	83–67	W1
151	September 23	Blue Jays	10–6	**Guerra** (1–0)	García (4–5)	—	17,407	84–67	W2
152	September 24	Blue Jays	1–3	Manoah (15–7)	**Rasmussen** (10–7)	Romano (35)	22,169	84–68	L1
153	September 25	Blue Jays	1–7	Stripling (9–4)	**McClanahan** (12–7)	—	16,394	84–69	L2
154	September 27	@ Guardians	6–5 (11)	**Guerra** (2–0)	Stephan (6–5)	**Faucher** (1)	10,775	85–69	W1
155	September 28	@ Guardians	1–2 (10)	Karinchak (2–0)	**Guerra** (2–1)	—	10,674	85–70	L1
156	September 29	@ Guardians	1–2	De Los Santos (5–0)	**Armstrong** (2–3)	Stephan (3)	11,783	85–71	L2
157	September 30	@ Astros	7–3	**Rasmussen** (11–7)	Valdez (16–6)	—	37,349	86–71	W1

October: 0–5 (Home: 0–0; Away: 0–5)

#	Date	Opponent	Score	Win	Loss	Save	Attendance	Record	Streak/Recap
158	October 1	@ Astros	1–2	Javier (11–9)	**McClanahan** (12–8)	Pressly (32)	37,406	86–72	L1
159	October 2	@ Astros	1–3	García (15–8)	**Kluber** (10–10)	Montero (14)	35,809	86–73	L2
160	October 3	@ Red Sox	3–4	Schreiber (4–4)	**Herget** (0–1)	Barnes (7)	26,633	86–74	L3
161	October 4	@ Red Sox	0–6 (5)	Eovaldi (6–3)	**Springs** (9–5)	—	26,477	86–75	L4
162	October 5	@ Red Sox	3–6	Bazardo (1–0)	**Fleming** (2–5)	Barnes (8)	26,695	86–76	L5

== Postseason ==
=== Game log ===
2022 Postseason Game Log
American League Wild Card Series

#	Date	Opponent	Score	Win	Loss	Save	Location Attendance	Series
1	October 7	@ Guardians	1–2	Bieber (1–0)	McClanahan (0–1)	Clase (1)	Progressive Field; 30,741	0–1
2	October 8	@ Guardians	0–1 (15)	Hentges (1–0)	Kluber (0–1)	—	Progressive Field; 34,971	0–2

=== Postseason rosters ===
Playoff rosters
American League Wild Card Series

- Pitchers: 18 Shane McClanahan 20 Tyler Glasnow 28 Corey Kluber 29 Pete Fairbanks 30 Brooks Raley 47 Jason Adam 57 Drew Rasmussen 59 Jeffrey Springs 60 Garrett Cleavinger 64 Shawn Armstrong 65 Javy Guerra 68 Jalen Beeks
- Catchers: 14 Christian Bethancourt 21 Francisco Mejía
- Infielders: 0 Taylor Walls 2 Yandy Díaz 5 Wander Franco 7 Vidal Bruján 17 Isaac Paredes 26 Ji-man Choi 43 Harold Ramírez 62 Jonathan Aranda
- Outfielders: 6 David Peralta 13 Manuel Margot 22 José Siri 56 Randy Arozarena

== Player stats ==
Note: Team leader in each category are indicated in bold.

=== Batting ===
Note: G = Games played; AB = At bats; R = Runs scored; H = Hits; 2B = Doubles; 3B = Triples; HR = Home runs; RBI = Runs batted in; AVG = Batting average; SB = Stolen bases

Player	G	AB	R	H	2B	3B	HR	RBI	AVG	SB
Jonathan Aranda	32	78	10	15	4	0	2	6	.192	0
Randy Arozarena	**153**	**586**	**72**	**154**	**41**	**3**	**20**	**89**	.263	**32**
Christian Bethancourt	44	149	16	38	6	0	7	15	.255	1
Vidal Bruján	52	147	13	24	5	0	3	16	.163	5
Yu Chang	36	96	11	25	3	0	3	12	.260	0
Ji-Man Choi	113	356	36	83	22	0	11	52	.233	0
Yandy Díaz	137	473	71	140	33	0	9	57	**.296**	3
Wander Franco	83	314	46	87	20	**3**	6	33	.277	8
Kevin Kiermaier	63	206	28	47	8	0	7	22	.228	6
Brandon Lowe	65	235	31	52	10	2	8	25	.221	1
Josh Lowe	52	181	24	40	12	2	2	13	.221	3
Manuel Margot	89	336	36	92	18	2	4	47	.274	7
Miles Mastrobuoni	8	16	1	3	0	0	0	0	.188	1
Francisco Mejía	93	289	32	70	22	0	6	31	.242	0
Isaac Paredes	111	331	48	68	16	0	**20**	45	.205	0
David Peralta	47	161	10	41	11	1	0	18	.255	0
Brett Phillips	75	184	21	27	4	0	5	14	.147	7
René Pinto	25	80	5	17	3	0	2	10	.213	0
Roman Quinn	21	42	7	11	2	2	0	4	.262	0
Luke Raley	22	61	7	12	2	0	1	4	.197	0
Harold Ramírez	120	403	46	121	24	0	6	58	.300	3
José Siri	56	166	35	40	9	0	4	14	.241	8
Taylor Walls	142	407	53	70	18	2	8	33	.172	10
Mike Zunino	36	115	7	17	3	0	5	16	.148	0
**Team totals**	**162**	**5412**	**666**	**1294**	**296**	**17**	**139**	**634**	**.239**	**95**

=== Pitching ===
Note: W = Wins; L = Losses; ERA = Earned run average; G = Games pitched; GS = Games started; SV = Saves; IP = Innings pitched; H = Hits allowed; R = Runs allowed; ER = Earned runs allowed; BB = Walks allowed; K = Strikeouts

Player	W	L	ERA	G	GS	SV	IP	H	R	ER	BB	K
Jason Adam	2	3	1.56	**67**	0	**8**	63.1	31	12	11	17	75
Shawn Armstrong	2	3	3.60	43	3	2	55.0	56	22	22	14	61
Luke Bard	1	1	1.93	8	0	0	14.0	7	3	3	7	8
Shane Baz	1	2	5.00	6	6	0	27.0	27	15	15	9	30
Jalen Beeks	2	3	2.80	42	7	2	61.0	49	22	19	22	70
Christian Bethancourt	0	0	3.00	3	0	0	3.0	6	1	1	0	1
Yu Chang	0	0	13.50	2	0	0	2.0	6	3	3	0	0
JT Chargois	2	0	2.42	21	3	0	22.1	16	7	6	5	17
Yonny Chirinos	1	0	0.00	2	1	0	7.0	7	0	0	1	6
Garrett Cleavinger	1	0	2.41	13	0	0	18.2	8	5	5	4	25
Cooper Criswell	0	0	2.70	1	1	0	3.1	2	1	1	1	4
Robert Dugger	0	0	5.06	1	0	0	5.1	8	3	3	0	7
Pete Fairbanks	0	0	1.13	24	0	**8**	24.0	13	3	3	3	38
Calvin Faucher	2	3	5.48	22	0	1	21.1	26	16	13	10	21
J. P. Feyereisen	4	0	0.00	22	2	1	24.1	7	1	0	5	25
Josh Fleming	2	5	6.43	10	3	0	35.0	54	36	25	12	29
Ralph Garza Jr.	2	2	3.34	19	0	0	35.0	38	14	13	16	17
Tyler Glasnow	0	0	1.35	2	2	0	6.2	4	1	1	2	10
Javy Guerra	2	1	3.38	17	0	0	16.0	13	7	6	8	9
Kevin Herget	0	1	7.71	3	0	0	7.0	9	6	6	0	4
Andrew Kittredge	3	1	3.15	17	0	5	20.0	15	7	7	2	14
Corey Kluber	10	**10**	4.34	31	**31**	0	164.0	**178**	**82**	**79**	21	139
Dusten Knight	0	1	5.73	6	0	0	11.0	11	8	7	4	9
Chris Mazza	1	0	11.81	2	0	0	5.1	9	10	7	6	5
Shane McClanahan	**12**	8	**2.54**	28	28	0	**166.1**	116	52	47	**38**	**194**
Easton McGee	0	0	0.00	1	0	0	3.0	4	1	0	0	1
David McKay	0	0	18.00	1	0	0	2.0	3	4	4	2	0
Cristofer Ogando	0	0	4.15	3	0	0	4.1	4	2	2	1	2
Luis Patiño	1	2	8.10	6	6	0	20.0	26	18	18	13	11
Brett Phillips	0	0	18.00	3	0	0	4.0	9	8	8	2	0
Colin Poche	4	2	3.99	65	0	7	58.2	46	30	26	22	64
Brooks Raley	1	2	2.68	60	0	6	53.2	37	19	16	15	61
Drew Rasmussen	11	7	2.84	28	28	0	146.0	121	51	46	31	125
Tommy Romero	1	0	7.71	3	1	0	4.2	3	4	4	5	5
Phoenix Sanders	0	0	3.07	8	0	0	14.2	12	5	5	3	12
Jeffrey Springs	9	5	2.46	33	25	0	135.1	114	42	37	31	144
Ryan Thompson	3	3	3.80	47	0	3	42.2	39	24	18	11	39
Matt Wisler	3	3	2.25	39	5	1	44.0	30	18	11	14	35
Jimmy Yacabonis	0	0	11.57	5	1	0	4.2	8	7	6	5	6
Ryan Yarbrough	3	8	4.50	20	9	0	80.0	88	44	40	22	61
**Team totals**	**86**	**76**	**3.41**	**162**	**162**	**44**	**1435.2**	**1260**	**614**	**544**	**384**	**1384**

== Roster ==
2022 Tampa Bay Rays
Roster
Pitchers: 47 Jason Adam; 64 Shawn Armstrong; 46 Luke Bard; 11 Shane Baz; 68 Jalen Beeks; 84 J. T. Chargois; 72 Yonny Chirinos; 60 Garrett Cleavinger; 71 Cooper Criswell; 44 Robert Dugger; 29 Peter Fairbanks; 58 Calvin Faucher; 34 J. P. Feyereisen; 19 Josh Fleming; 61 Ralph Garza Jr.; 20 Tyler Glasnow; 25,65 Javy Guerra; 44 Kevin Herget; 36 Andrew Kittredge; 28 Corey Kluber; 76 Dusten Knight; 22 Chris Mazza; 18 Shane McClanahan; 73 Easton McGee; 74 David McKay; 75 Cristofer Ogando; 1 Luis Patiño; 38 Colin Poche; 30 Brooks Raley; 57 Drew Rasmussen; 52 Tommy Romero; 80 Phoenix Sanders; 59 Jeffrey Springs; 81 Ryan Thompson; 37 Matt Wisler; 46 Jimmy Yacabonis; 48 Ryan Yarbrough	Catchers: 14 Christian Bethancourt; 21 Francisco Mejía; 50 René Pinto; 10 Mike Zunino; Infielders: 62 Jonathan Aranda; 7 Vidal Bruján; 9 Yu Chang; 26 Ji-man Choi; 2 Yandy Díaz; 5 Wander Franco; 8 Brandon Lowe; 78 Miles Mastrobuoni; 17 Isaac Paredes; 43 Harold Ramírez; 0,6 Taylor Walls	Outfielders: 56 Randy Arozarena; 39 Kevin Kiermaier; 15 Josh Lowe; 13 Manuel Margot; 6 David Peralta; 35 Brett Phillips; 25 Roman Quinn; 55 Luke Raley; 22 José Siri	Manager: 16 Kevin Cash; Coaches: 41 Stan Boroski (bullpen); 40 Dan DeMent (assistant hitting); 99 Misha Dworken (bullpen catcher); 97 Jonathan Erlichman (analytics coach); 24 Paul Hoover (field coordinator); 92 Rick Knapp (assistant pitching); 27 Rodney Linares (third base); 51 Chad Mottola (hitting); 53 Brady North (assistant hitting); 31 Chris Prieto (first base); 33 Matt Quatraro (bench); 23 Kyle Snyder (pitching)

== Farm system ==
Level	Team	League	Manager
AAA	Durham Bulls	International League	
AA	Montgomery Biscuits	Carolina League	
High-A	Bowling Green Hot Rods	South Atlantic League	
A	Charleston RiverDogs	Carolina League	
Rookie	FCL Rays	Florida Complex League	
Foreign Rookie	DSL Rays 1	Dominican Summer League	
Foreign Rookie	DSL Rays 2	Dominican Summer League	
