= Dusten Knight =

American baseball player (born 1990)

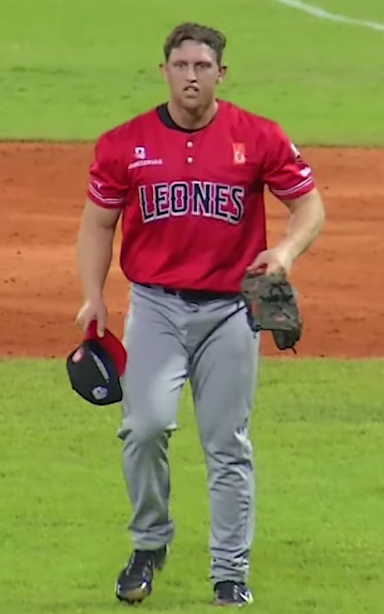
- Knight with Leones del Escogido in 2021
- Pitcher
- Born: September 2, 1990 (age 35); Tahlequah, Oklahoma, U.S.
- Batted: Right Threw: Right

MLB debut
- August 4, 2021, for the Baltimore Orioles

Last MLB appearance
- September 22, 2022, for the Tampa Bay Rays

MLB statistics
- Win–loss record: 0–1
- Earned run average: 7.32
- Strikeouts: 20
- Stats at Baseball Reference

Teams
- Baltimore Orioles (2021); Tampa Bay Rays (2022)

Dusten Devoil Knight (born September 2, 1990) is an American former professional baseball pitcher. He has previously played in Major League Baseball (MLB) for the Baltimore Orioles and Tampa Bay Rays. He was drafted by the San Francisco Giants in the 28th round of the 2013 MLB draft.

== Amateur career ==
Knight attended Tahlequah High School in Tahlequah, Oklahoma. Undrafted out of high school, he attended Connors State College for two years, before transferring to University of Texas–Pan American in Edinburg, Texas for two years.

== Professional career ==
=== San Francisco Giants ===
Knight was drafted by the San Francisco Giants in the 28th round of the 2013 MLB draft. Knight made his professional debut with the rookie-level Arizona League Giants, and capped his debut year with a 1.13 ERA in 18 appearances. In 2014, Knight played for the Low-A Salem-Keizer Volcanoes, pitching to a 3.65 ERA with 44 strikeouts in 24 games. He spent the following season with the Single-A Augusta GreenJackets, logging a 2.69 ERA in 38 games with the team. In 2016, Knight played for the High-A San Jose Giants, but wasn't as effective as his previous years, posting a 5.02 ERA in 43 games. For the 2017 season, Knight split the year between San Jose and the Triple-A Sacramento River Cats, accumulating a 2.93 ERA with 83 strikeouts in 76.2 innings pitched across 39 appearances. In 2018, Knight played for Sacramento, the Double-A Richmond Flying Squirrels, and the AZL Giants, recording a 1.71 ERA in 29 games between the three affiliates.

=== Minnesota Twins ===
On December 13, 2018, Knight was selected by the Minnesota Twins in the minor league phase of the 2018 Rule 5 draft. Knight opened the 2019 season with the Double-A Pensacola Blue Wahoos in the Twins organization, going 1.59 ERA over 7 games before being released on May 3, 2019.

=== Diablos Rojos del México ===
On May 7, 2019, Knight signed with the Diablos Rojos del México of the Mexican League, going 2–4 with a 5.55 ERA over 23 games with them. He was released on July 15.

=== Southern Maryland Blue Crabs ===
On July 24, 2019, Knight signed with the Southern Maryland Blue Crabs of the Atlantic League of Professional Baseball. He finished the season going 3–6 with a 3.78 ERA and 92 strikeouts over 78.2 innings pitched. Knight did not play in 2020 with the cancellation of the 2020 minor league season due to the COVID-19 pandemic. He became a free agent after the year.

=== Baltimore Orioles ===
On February 2, 2021, Knight signed a minor league contract with the Baltimore Orioles. He opened the season with the Triple-A Norfolk Tides, pitching to a 3.05 ERA in 35 appearances.

On August 4, 2021, Knight was selected to the 40-man roster and promoted to the major leagues for the first time. Knight struggled with Baltimore, making 7 appearances with a 9.35 ERA and 11 strikeouts. On September 19, the Orioles designated Knight for assignment. He was outrighted to Norfolk on September 21. On November 7, 2021, Knight elected free agency.

=== Tampa Bay Rays ===
On February 10, 2022, Knight signed a minor league contract with the Tampa Bay Rays. On April 13, the Rays selected Knight's contract to the active roster. He was designated for assignment the next day following the promotion of Phoenix Sanders. On April 17, Knight was sent outright to the Triple-A Durham Bulls. On May 22, Knight was selected back to the active roster.

He was designated for assignment again on July 17 after Pete Fairbanks was activated from the injured list. He was again sent outright to Triple-A on July 20. On September 22, Knight was yet again selected to the major league roster. The following day, Knight was designated for assignment by the Rays for the third time after Calvin Faucher and Cristofer Ogando were recalled from Durham. He cleared waivers and was sent outright to Triple–A on September 25. Knight elected free agency on October 9.

=== Cleveland Guardians ===
On February 8, 2023, Knight signed a minor league contract with the Cleveland Guardians. Knight was released by the organization on March 25.

== See also ==
- Rule 5 draft results
