= 2022 American League Wild Card Series =

Teams
| Team (Wins) | | Manager | Season |
| Cleveland Guardians (2) | | Terry Francona | 92–70 (.568), GA: 11 |
| Tampa Bay Rays (0) | | Kevin Cash | 86–76 (.531), GB: 13 |
- Dates: October 7–8
- Television: ESPN (Game 1); ESPN2 (Game 2)
- TV announcers: Jon Sciambi, Doug Glanville, and Jesse Rogers
- Radio: ESPN
- Radio announcers: Dave O'Brien and Marly Rivera
- Umpires: Ted Barrett (crew chief), Doug Eddings, Adam Hamari, Hunter Wendelstedt, Chad Whitson, Quinn Wolcott

Teams
| Team (Wins) | | Manager | Season |
| Seattle Mariners (2) | | Scott Servais | 90–72 (.556), GB: 16 |
| Toronto Blue Jays (0) | | John Schneider | 92–70 (.568), GB: 7 |
- Dates: October 7–8
- Television: Canada: Sportsnet; United States: ESPN
- TV announcers: Buck Martinez, Pat Tabler, and Hazel Mae (Sportsnet); Dave Flemming, Jessica Mendoza, Tim Kurkjian, and Coley Harvey (ESPN)
- Radio: ESPN
- Radio announcers: Dan Shulman and Gregg Olson
- Umpires: Lance Barrett, Andy Fletcher, Brian Knight, Jerry Meals (crew chief), Roberto Ortiz, Todd Tichenor

The 2022 American League Wild Card Series were two best-of-three playoff series in Major League Baseball’s (MLB) 2022 postseason that determined the participating teams of the 2022 American League Division Series (ALDS). Both Wild Card Series began on October 7, with Game 2s scheduled for October 8. ESPN broadcast both Wild Card Series in the United States together with ESPN Radio. For the first time, Canadian rightsholder Sportsnet – a sibling property to the Toronto Blue Jays under Rogers Communications – was allowed to produce its own broadcast of a Blue Jays postseason series; previously, it was required to simulcast a U.S. or MLB International broadcast. These matchups were:

- (3) Cleveland Guardians (AL Central champions) vs. (6) Tampa Bay Rays (third wild card): Guardians won the series, 2–0.
- (4) Toronto Blue Jays (first wild card) vs. (5) Seattle Mariners (second wild card): Mariners won the series, 2–0.

== Background ==
On March 10, Major League Baseball changed the postseason structure for the first time since 2012, adding a sixth team to the postseason in each league, awarding the two best division winners in each league (seeded by record) a bye into the Division Series, and added a best-of-three Wild Card round hosted by the higher seed. The lowest-seeded division winner, and three wild card teams (each seeded according to regular season record), will play in this round. The third seed will play the sixth seed, and the fourth seed will play the fifth seed. The postseason structure is similar to the temporary format MLB used in 2020 due to the COVID-19 pandemic without first-round byes for the top two seeds.

The Cleveland Guardians (92–70) clinched the American League Central, their first postseason appearance since 2020, and their first under the Guardians moniker. However, they were locked into the third seed as the American League division winner with the worst record and hosted the Tampa Bay Rays (86–76), who clinched a postseason berth, their fourth straight postseason appearance and eighth overall in franchise history, with all eight coming since 2008, on September 30. In six regular-season meetings in 2022, the Guardians bested the Rays 4–2, including two out of three less than a week ago in Cleveland.

The Toronto Blue Jays (92–70) clinched a postseason berth on September 29 for their first appearance since 2020 after missing out on the postseason by one game last year and secured home-field advantage in the wild card round as the best wild card team (non-division winner) in terms of record on October 3, accomplishing back-to-back 90-win seasons for the first time since 1992 and 1993, which were the two seasons they repeated as champions. They hosted their 1977-expansion cousins Seattle Mariners (90–72), who clinched their first postseason berth since 2001, ending the longest postseason drought in North American professional sports on September 30. The Mariners won the regular-season series 5–2 over the Blue Jays in 2022, including a four-game sweep in July in Seattle. Despite handling Toronto for those seven games, the Mariners only outscored the Blue Jays 26–21 on the season.

As the top two seeds, the Houston Astros (106–56) and New York Yankees (99–63) earned a bye and home-field advantage in the ALDS.

== Matchups ==
=== Cleveland Guardians vs. Tampa Bay Rays ===
Cleveland won the series, 2–0.

| Game | Date | Score | Location | Time | Attendance |
|---|---|---|---|---|---|
| 1 | October 7 | Tampa Bay Rays – 1, Cleveland Guardians – 2 | Progressive Field | 2:17 | 30,741 |
| 2 | October 8 | Tampa Bay Rays – 0, Cleveland Guardians – 1 (15) | Progressive Field | 4:57 | 34,971 |

=== Toronto Blue Jays vs. Seattle Mariners ===
Seattle won the series, 2–0.

| Game | Date | Score | Location | Time | Attendance |
|---|---|---|---|---|---|
| 1 | October 7 | Seattle Mariners – 4, Toronto Blue Jays – 0 | Rogers Centre | 3:01 | 47,402 |
| 2 | October 8 | Seattle Mariners – 10, Toronto Blue Jays – 9 | Rogers Centre | 4:15 | 47,156 |

== Cleveland vs. Tampa Bay ==
This was the second postseason match-up between Cleveland and Tampa Bay. The two teams previously met in the 2013 American League Wild Card Game when Tampa Bay defeated Cleveland 4–0.

=== Game 1 ===
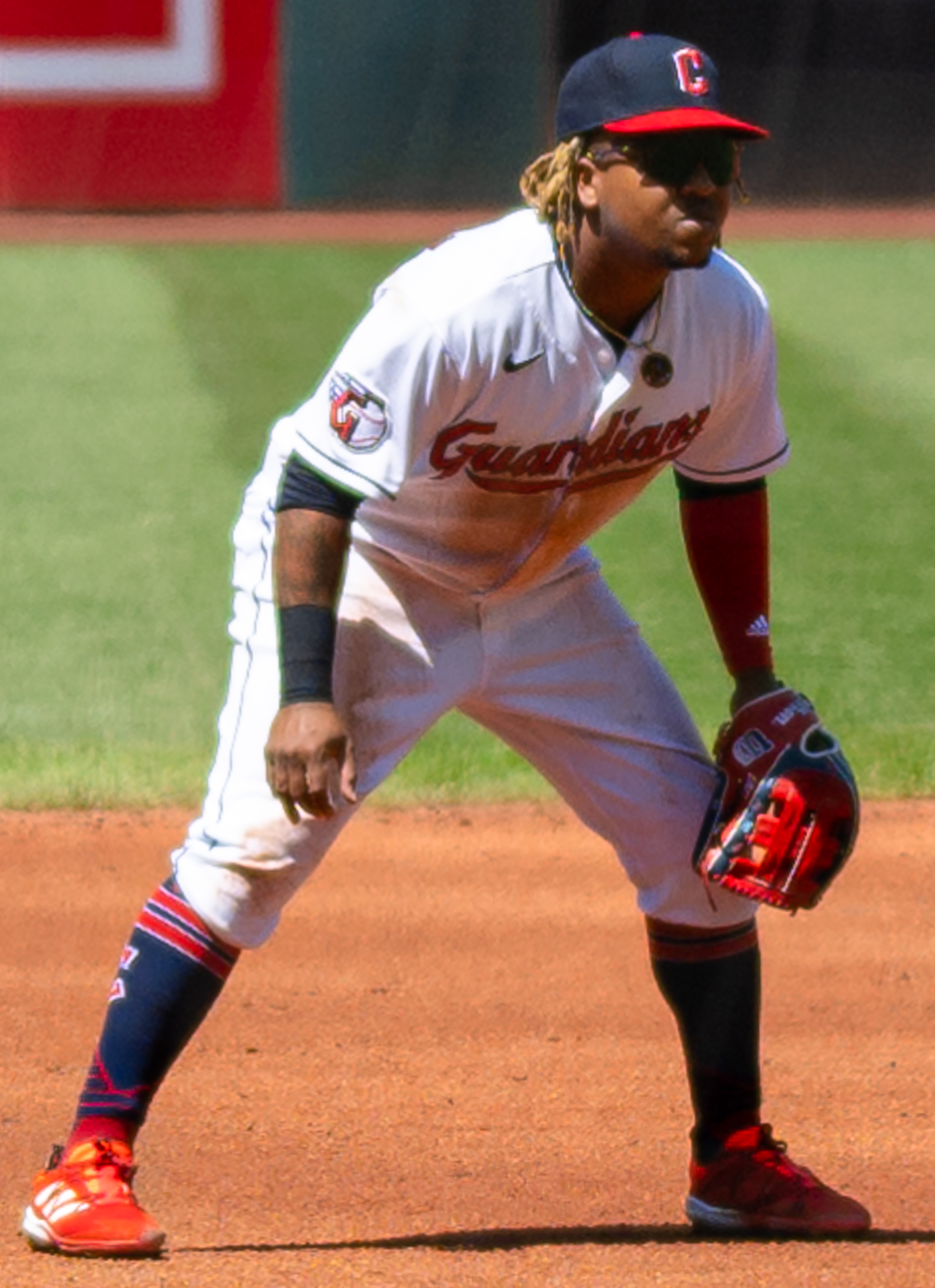
José Ramírez hit a go-ahead two-run home run in the sixth inning of Game 1.

October 7, 2022 12:07 pm (EDT) at Progressive Field in Cleveland, Ohio 52 °F (11 °C), Cloudy
| Team | 1 | 2 | 3 | 4 | 5 | 6 | 7 | 8 | 9 | R | H | E |
|---|---|---|---|---|---|---|---|---|---|---|---|---|
| Tampa Bay | 0 | 0 | 0 | 0 | 0 | 1 | 0 | 0 | 0 | 1 | 3 | 1 |
| Cleveland | 0 | 0 | 0 | 0 | 0 | 2 | 0 | 0 | X | 2 | 8 | 0 |
WP: Shane Bieber (1–0) LP: Shane McClanahan (0–1) Sv: Emmanuel Clase (1); Home runs: TB: José Siri (1); CLE: José Ramírez (1); Attendance: 30,741; Boxscore

Game 1 featured a pitching duel between Cy Young candidates Shane Bieber and Shane McClanahan. The game was scoreless until a José Siri solo home run in the top of the sixth inning, which would immediately be topped by a José Ramírez two-run home run in the bottom of the sixth. Bieber went 7 2/3, only throwing 99 pitches on the day while not allowing a hit until the fifth inning. Two runs would be all the Guardians needed as Emmanuel Clase closed the game with a perfect ninth, giving the All-Star closer his first career postseason save.

At a brisk two hours and 17 minutes, it was the shortest postseason game since Game 2 of the 1999 NLDS between the Braves and Astros.

=== Game 2 ===
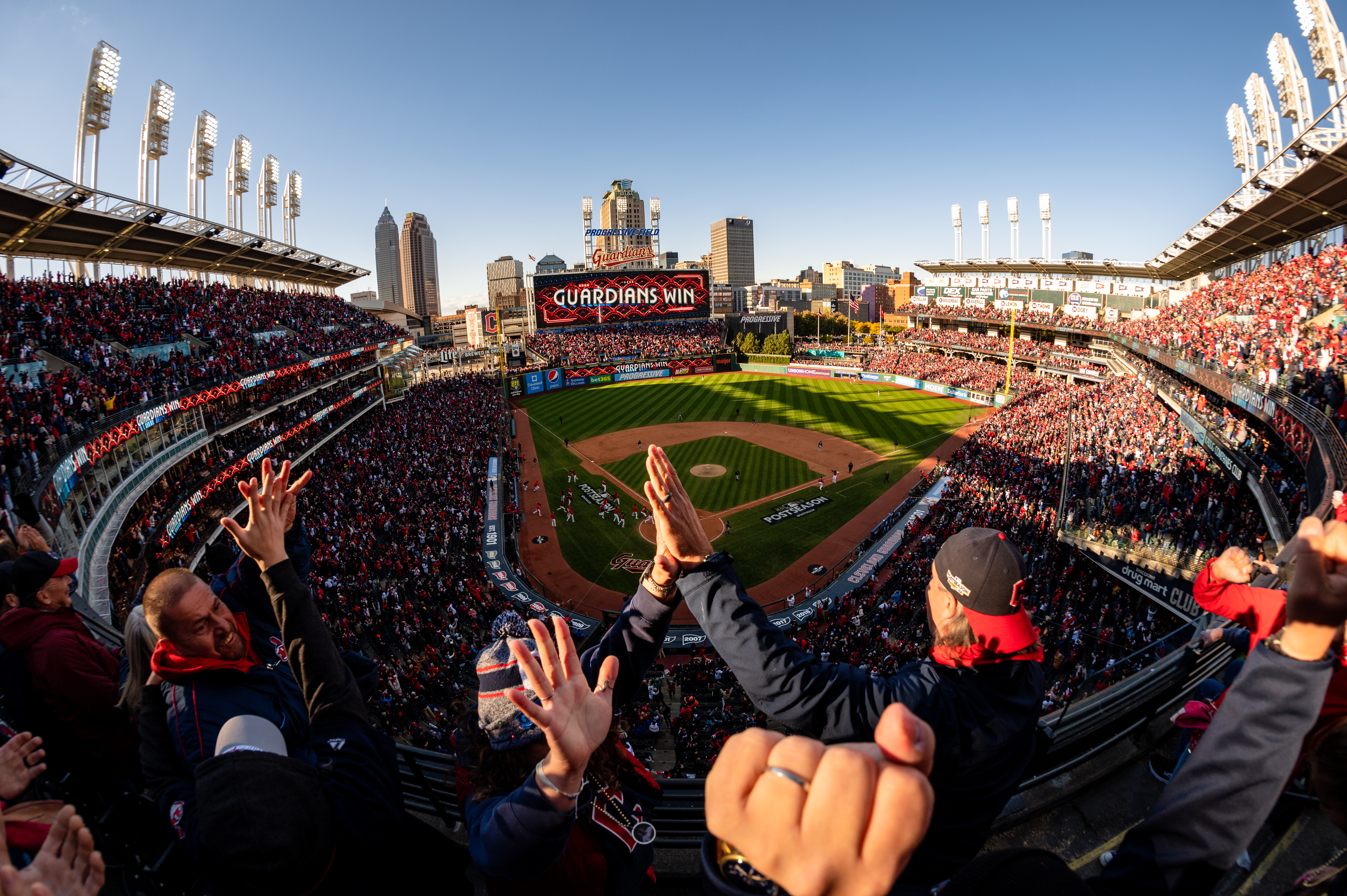
Fans celebrate at Progressive Field as Oscar González rounds the bases on his walk-off home run

October 8, 2022 12:07 pm (EDT) at Progressive Field in Cleveland, Ohio 49 °F (9 °C), Partly sunny
| Team | 1 | 2 | 3 | 4 | 5 | 6 | 7 | 8 | 9 | 10 | 11 | 12 | 13 | 14 | 15 | R | H | E |
|---|---|---|---|---|---|---|---|---|---|---|---|---|---|---|---|---|---|---|
| Tampa Bay | 0 | 0 | 0 | 0 | 0 | 0 | 0 | 0 | 0 | 0 | 0 | 0 | 0 | 0 | 0 | 0 | 6 | 0 |
| Cleveland | 0 | 0 | 0 | 0 | 0 | 0 | 0 | 0 | 0 | 0 | 0 | 0 | 0 | 0 | 1 | 1 | 5 | 0 |
WP: Sam Hentges (1–0) LP: Corey Kluber (0–1); Home runs: TB: None; CLE: Oscar González (1); Attendance: 34,971; Boxscore

In the contest, the Rays and Guardians used eight pitchers each and totaled 39 strikeouts. The Guardians came close to scoring in the bottom of the sixth, where they had the bases loaded with no outs, but José Ramírez struck out and Josh Naylor grounded into a double play to end the inning scoreless. The Rays had runners on the corners in the top of the 12th, but Ramírez turned a ground ball by Manuel Margot into a difficult out at first base to end the inning. In the bottom of the 13th, with both teams having increasingly depleted bullpens, ace Corey Kluber made his first relief appearance in more than nine years, that would eventually end up surrendering the walk-off home run to Oscar González. Sam Hentges, on the other hand, lasted the longest among all relievers, pitching the last three full innings for Cleveland while not allowing a single hit, striking out six batters, and earning the win. It was Cleveland's first postseason series win since the 2016 American League Championship Series.

With 14 innings scoreless for both teams, this was the longest scoreless postseason game in Major League history, until the Astros and Mariners surpassed it a week later in Game 3 of the 2022 American League Division Series. For Tampa Bay, the walk-off series-ending loss was their seventh straight loss (regular season and postseason).

=== Composite line score ===
2022 ALWC (2–0): Cleveland Guardians beat Tampa Bay Rays

| Team | 1 | 2 | 3 | 4 | 5 | 6 | 7 | 8 | 9 | 10 | 11 | 12 | 13 | 14 | 15 | R | H | E |
|---|---|---|---|---|---|---|---|---|---|---|---|---|---|---|---|---|---|---|
| Tampa Bay Rays | 0 | 0 | 0 | 0 | 0 | 1 | 0 | 0 | 0 | 0 | 0 | 0 | 0 | 0 | 0 | 1 | 9 | 1 |
| Cleveland Guardians | 0 | 0 | 0 | 0 | 0 | 2 | 0 | 0 | 0 | 0 | 0 | 0 | 0 | 0 | 1 | 3 | 13 | 0 |
Total attendance: 65,712 Average attendance: 32,856

== Toronto vs. Seattle ==
This was the first postseason match-up between Toronto and Seattle.

=== Game 1 ===
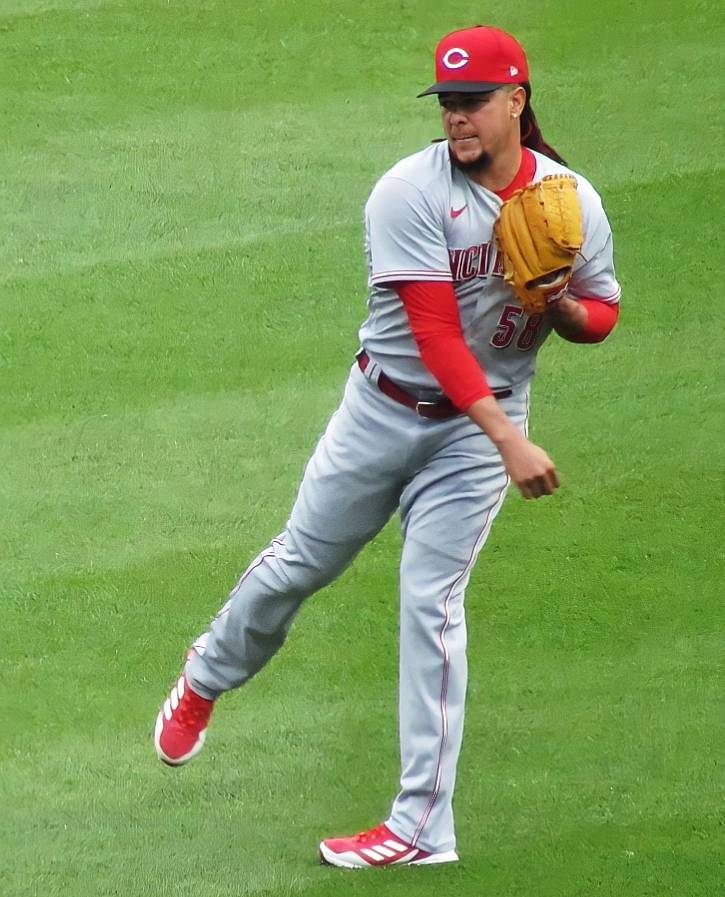
Luis Castillo (pictured here with the Reds) earned the win in Game 1.

October 7, 2022 4:07 pm (EDT) at Rogers Centre in Toronto, Ontario 70 °F (21 °C), Roof closed
| Team | 1 | 2 | 3 | 4 | 5 | 6 | 7 | 8 | 9 | R | H | E |
|---|---|---|---|---|---|---|---|---|---|---|---|---|
| Seattle | 3 | 0 | 0 | 0 | 1 | 0 | 0 | 0 | 0 | 4 | 7 | 0 |
| Toronto | 0 | 0 | 0 | 0 | 0 | 0 | 0 | 0 | 0 | 0 | 7 | 0 |
WP: Luis Castillo (1–0) LP: Alek Manoah (0–1); Home runs: SEA: Cal Raleigh (1); TOR: None; Attendance: 47,402; Boxscore

Blue Jays starter Alek Manoah began the game by hitting the Mariners' star rookie outfielder Julio Rodríguez. Two batters later, Eugenio Suárez flipped a line drive down the right field line for an RBI double, scoring Rodríguez. Cal Raleigh then worked Manoah a full count before hitting a home run over the right field fence to give the Mariners a 3–0 lead in the top of the first. In the Seattle fifth, Suarez drove in another run when his fielder's choice plated Rodriguez. Four runs would be all that Mariners ace Luis Castillo needed, as the big trade deadline acquisition twirled a shutout over 7 1/3 innings, striking out five and allowing just six hits. Castillo was the first ever Mariners pitcher to throw at least seven scoreless innings in a postseason game.

Andrés Muñoz relieved Castillo in the eighth and finished off the game for Seattle with a five-out performance, giving the team its first postseason victory since Game 3 of the 2001 American League Championship Series. For the Blue Jays, George Springer and Matt Chapman each had two hits, while Toronto relievers combined for 3 1/3 scoreless innings after Manoah exited the game.

=== Game 2 ===
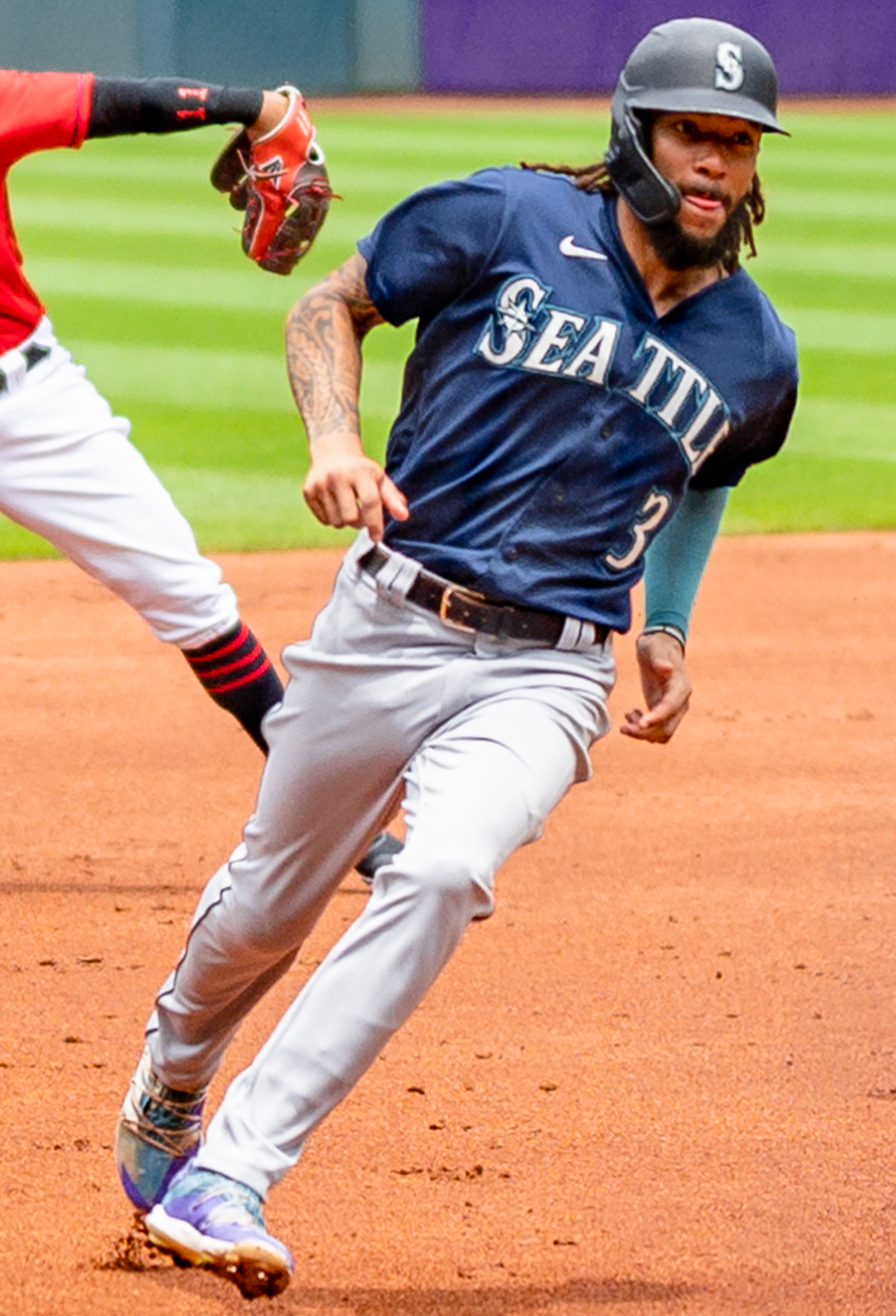
J. P. Crawford hit a bases-clearing bloop double in the top of the 8th to tie the game.

October 8, 2022 4:07 pm (EDT) at Rogers Centre in Toronto, Ontario 70 °F (21 °C), Roof closed
| Team | 1 | 2 | 3 | 4 | 5 | 6 | 7 | 8 | 9 | R | H | E |
|---|---|---|---|---|---|---|---|---|---|---|---|---|
| Seattle | 0 | 0 | 0 | 0 | 1 | 4 | 0 | 4 | 1 | 10 | 13 | 0 |
| Toronto | 0 | 2 | 1 | 1 | 4 | 0 | 1 | 0 | 0 | 9 | 12 | 1 |
WP: Andrés Muñoz (1–0) LP: Jordan Romano (0–1) Sv: George Kirby (1); Home runs: SEA: Carlos Santana (1); TOR: Teoscar Hernández 2 (2); Attendance: 47,156; Boxscore

In Game 2, Seattle came back from a seven-run deficit to clinch the series, in what would become tied for the second largest comeback in MLB postseason history, and the largest comeback in MLB postseason history on the road.

The Mariners' Robbie Ray, a Cy Young Award winner for the Blue Jays the preceding year, faced off against Toronto's Kevin Gausman, who was brought in during the off-season to essentially replace Ray. The Blue Jays got off to a fast start, scoring four runs on a two-run home run by Teoscar Hernández in the bottom of the second, a run batted in by Vladimir Guerrero Jr. in the third, and another home run by Hernández in the fourth which chased Ray. The Mariners got their first hit in the fifth inning when a sacrifice fly by Jarred Kelenic got them on the board. With the score now 4–1, the Blue Jays increased their lead by scoring four more runs off Seattle reliever Paul Sewald. However, in the top of the sixth, Gausman loaded the bases on three consecutive singles. After a strikeout and a pop-out, he was relieved by Tim Mayza, who allowed Seattle to cut the lead down to 8–5 on a wild pitch and a three-run home run from Carlos Santana. The Blue Jays extended their lead by a run in the seventh on a Danny Jansen single scoring Matt Chapman.

Seattle responded in the top of the eighth inning, cutting the score to 9–6 after four straight batters reached base. With the bases loaded again, Toronto's closer Jordan Romano (who was brought in to relieve Anthony Bass with runners on first and second with no outs) struck out Santana and Dylan Moore before George Springer and Bo Bichette collided on a bloop bases-clearing double by J. P. Crawford to improbably tie the game at nine. Springer got the worst of the collision and had to be carted off the field. After reliever Andrés Muñoz allowed no runs in the bottom of the eighth, the Mariners took the lead in the top of the ninth on a Adam Frazier double scoring Cal Raleigh, who also doubled earlier in the inning. In the bottom of the ninth, rookie starter George Kirby worked around a one-out walk to Chapman to earn the first save of his career and send the Mariners to the American League Division Series.

=== Composite line score ===
2022 ALWC (2–0): Seattle Mariners beat Toronto Blue Jays

| Team | 1 | 2 | 3 | 4 | 5 | 6 | 7 | 8 | 9 | R | H | E |
|---|---|---|---|---|---|---|---|---|---|---|---|---|
| Seattle Mariners | 3 | 0 | 0 | 0 | 2 | 4 | 0 | 4 | 1 | 14 | 20 | 0 |
| Toronto Blue Jays | 0 | 2 | 1 | 1 | 4 | 0 | 1 | 0 | 0 | 9 | 19 | 1 |
Total attendance: 94,558 Average attendance: 47,279

== See also ==
- 2022 National League Wild Card Series
- Blue Jays–Mariners rivalry
