= Javy Guerra =

Javy Guerra may refer to:

- Javy Guerra (baseball, born 1985), an American professional baseball pitcher in the Mexican League
- Javy Guerra (baseball, born 1995), a Panamanian professional baseball pitcher in Major League Baseball
