= Cristofer Ogando =

Dominican baseball player (born 1993)

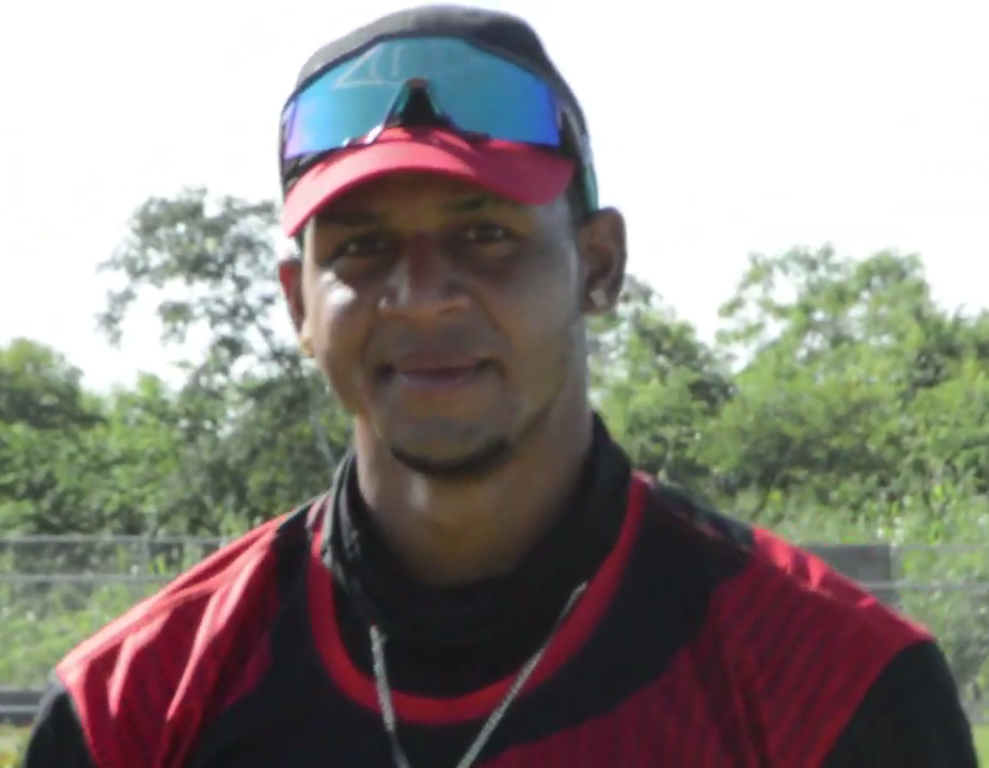
- Ogando with Leones del Escogido in 2020

Marineros de Carabobo – No. 67
- Relief pitcher
- Born: October 23, 1993 (age 32); Santo Domingo, Dominican Republic
- Bats: Right Throws: Right

MLB debut
- July 3, 2022, for the Tampa Bay Rays

MLB statistics (through 2022 season)
- Win–loss record: 0–0
- Earned run average: 4.15
- Strikeouts: 2
- Stats at Baseball Reference

Teams
- Tampa Bay Rays (2022)

Cristofer Jesus Ogando (born October 23, 1993) is a Dominican professional baseball relief pitcher for the Marineros de Carabobo of the Venezuelan Major League. He has previously played in Major League Baseball (MLB) for the Tampa Bay Rays.

== Professional career ==
=== Miami Marlins ===
Ogando signed with the Miami Marlins on January 17, 2013, as an international free agent. He made his professional debut for the Dominican Summer League Marlins in 2013, pitching in five games and ending the season with an 8.53 earned run average. After being released by the Marlins on December 17, 2013, he did not play professionally from 2014 to 2017, instead playing in amateur baseball leagues.

=== Arizona Diamondbacks ===
On June 5, 2018, Ogando signed a minor league contract with the Arizona Diamondbacks. He split the year between the Dominican Summer League Diamondbacks, rookie–level Missoula Osprey, and Low–A Hillsboro Hops. In 19 relief outings split between the three affiliates, Ogando pitched to a 1.34 ERA with 45 strikeouts across 33 2/3 innings pitched.

=== Tampa Bay Rays ===
On December 13, 2018, Ogando was selected by the Tampa Bay Rays in the minor league phase of the Rule 5 draft. He split the 2019 season between the Single–A Bowling Green Hot Rods and High–A Charlotte Stone Crabs, accumulating a 2.63 ERA with 70 strikeouts and 8 saves. Ogando did not play in a game in 2020 due to the cancellation of the minor league season because of the COVID-19 pandemic. In 2021, Ogando split the year between Bowling Green, the Double–A Montgomery Biscuits, and Triple-A Durham Bulls, combining to post a 5–3 record and 4.91 ERA with 74 strikeouts. He began 2022 back with Durham, pitching to a 3.03 ERA across 21 games.

On July 3, 2022, Ogando was selected to the 40-man roster and promoted to the major leagues for the first time. Ogando made his debut that day against the Toronto Blue Jays, allowing one run in 2.0 innings and striking out Vladimir Guerrero Jr.. He was sent back down to Durham the following day. On July 21, Ogando was designated for assignment following the signing of Roman Quinn. He had his contract selected again on September 23. On September 29, Ogando was designated for assignment following the promotion of Easton McGee. He cleared waivers and was sent outright to Triple–A Durham on October 1. Ogando elected free agency on October 11.

=== Pericos de Puebla ===
On April 19, 2023, Ogando signed with the Pericos de Puebla of the Mexican League. In 10 appearances for Puebla, he logged a 6.75 ERA with 8 strikeouts in 10 2/3 innings of work. Ogando was released by the team on May 11.

=== Charleston Dirty Birds ===
On June 20, 2023. Ogando signed with the Charleston Dirty Birds of the Atlantic League of Professional Baseball. In 10 games for the Dirty Birds, he recorded a 3.72 ERA with 13 strikeouts in 9 2/3 innings pitched.

=== Staten Island FerryHawks ===
On July 20, 2023, Ogando was traded to the Staten Island FerryHawks in exchange for a player to be named later. In 6 appearances for Staten Island, he registered a 2.57 ERA with 9 strikeouts and one save in 7.0 innings pitched. On January 8, 2024, Ogando was released by the FerryHawks.

=== Charleston Dirty Birds (second stint) ===
On February 17, 2024, Ogando signed with the Charleston Dirty Birds of the Atlantic League of Professional Baseball. In 24 appearances (9 starts), he posted a 8–0 record with a 4.02 ERA and 90 strikeouts over 69 1/3 innings. Ogando became a free agent following the season.

=== Saraperos de Saltillo ===
On December 5, 2024, Ogando signed with the Saraperos de Saltillo of the Mexican League. He made seven starts for Saltillo in 2025, posting a 4–3 record and 7.43 ERA with 24 strikeouts across 26 2/3 innings pitched. Ogando was released by the Saraperos on June 3, 2025.

=== Caliente de Durango ===
On June 6, 2025, Ogando signed with the Caliente de Durango of the Mexican League. In four starts for Durango, he struggled to a 12.75 ERA with seven strikeouts over 12 innings of work. Ogando was released by the Caliente on June 29.

=== Charleston Dirty Birds (second stint) ===
On April 18, 2026, Ogando signed with the Charleston Dirty Birds of the Atlantic League of Professional Baseball. Ogando was released on May 15, 2026. In 5 starts he threw 18.2 innings struggling mightily going 0–5 with a 12.54 ERA with 4 strikeouts.

=== Marineros de Carabobo ===
On May 20, 2026, Ogando signed with the Marineros de Carabobo of the Venezuelan Major League.

== See also ==
- List of Major League Baseball players from the Dominican Republic
