= Kevin Herget =

American baseball player (born 1991)

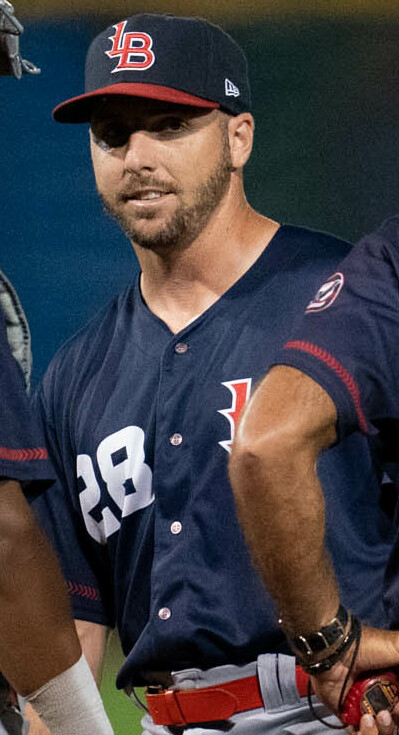
- Herget with the Louisville Bats in 2023

Free agent
- Pitcher
- Born: April 3, 1991 (age 35); Teaneck, New Jersey, U.S.
- Bats: Left Throws: Right

MLB debut
- September 13, 2022, for the Tampa Bay Rays

MLB statistics (through 2026 season)
- Win–loss record: 1–3
- Earned run average: 4.13
- Strikeouts: 32
- Stats at Baseball Reference

Teams
- Tampa Bay Rays (2022); Cincinnati Reds (2023); Milwaukee Brewers (2024); New York Mets (2025); Atlanta Braves (2025); New York Mets (2025–2026)

Kevin R. Herget (born April 3, 1991) is an American professional baseball pitcher who is a free agent. He has previously played in Major League Baseball (MLB) for the Tampa Bay Rays, Cincinnati Reds, Milwaukee Brewers, New York Mets, and Atlanta Braves. He made his MLB debut in 2022.

== Career ==
=== Amateur career ===
Born in Teaneck, New Jersey, Herget played prep baseball at Park Ridge High School in Park Ridge, New Jersey. As a senior in 2009, he helped lead his team to the Group 1 championship, its first state title since 1977. That year he posted a 1.62 ERA, a 9-2 record and led the team with 8 home runs, 40 runs and 33 RBI. He also wrestled and played soccer in high school.

Herget attended Kean University, where he played Division III college baseball. He set Kean records in innings (345), strikeouts (356) and wins (31). As a senior in 2015, his 106 strikeouts were the second-most in Division III. His teams reached the NCAA Division III World Series in three straight seasons. He was inducted into Kean's Hall of Fame in 2021. Herget was the first baseball player to have his number 16 retired by the university.

=== St. Louis Cardinals ===
The St. Louis Cardinals selected Herget in the 39th round of the 2013 Major League Baseball draft.

"I knew there was a chance I would get drafted, but never expected it. So that morning I was on a coaching job interview for the summer. Obviously, throughout the day I was peaking at the draft on my phone. Once they got to round 37, I thought my baseball career was over. So I was at home just watching TV with my girlfriend and my family. When I got the call, I was in shock and was just really happy someone gave me a chance. So it's safe to say it was a day filled with a wide range of emotions."

He made his professional debut with the Low-A State College Spikes. In 2014, he split the season between the Single-A Peoria Chiefs and High-A Palm Beach Cardinals, pitching to a cumulative 8–3 record and 2.71 ERA with 94 strikeouts and 4 saves in 76 1/3 innings of work. He spent 2015 with Palm Beach and the Double-A Springfield Cardinals, posting a 5–2 record and 2.64 ERA with 74 strikeouts and 7 saves in 42 appearances. In 2016, Herget reached Triple-A for the first time with the Memphis Redbirds. In 49 appearances between Palm Beach, Springfield, and Memphis, he recorded a 5–0 record and 2.02 ERA with 61 strikeouts and 16 saves in 62 1/3 innings pitched.

In 2017, Herget played for Springfield and Memphis, pitching to a 5–4 record and 3.97 ERA with 81 strikeouts and 5 saves in 81 2/3 innings of work. He spent the 2018 season with Memphis and recorded a 9–11 record and 4.61 ERA with 121 strikeouts in 138 2/3 innings pitched across 28 games (22 starts). After undergoing Tommy John surgery, Herget missed the majority of the 2019 season as a result, making only two rehab appearances with the Gulf Coast Cardinals. He did not play in a game in 2020 due to the cancellation of the minor league season because of the COVID-19 pandemic. Herget became a minor league free agent on November 2, 2020.

=== Fargo-Moorhead Redhawks ===
On January 25, 2021, Herget signed with the Fargo-Moorhead RedHawks of the American Association of Professional Baseball. He started one game for the team, allowing one run on three hits in seven innings pitched en route to the victory.

=== Cleveland Indians ===
On May 24, 2021, Herget's contract was purchased by the Cleveland Indians organization. Herget made 28 appearances (7 starts) for the Triple-A Columbus Clippers, posting a 7–5 record and 4.48 ERA with 85 strikeouts and 2 saves in 80 1/3 innings pitched. He was released by the organization on October 4.

=== Charleston Dirty Birds ===
On April 12, 2022, Herget signed with the Charleston Dirty Birds of the Atlantic League of Professional Baseball. On April 19, the team announced that Herget would be their opening day starter against the Staten Island FerryHawks. In three starts for the club, Herget pitched to a 4.24 ERA with 19 strikeouts in 17 innings of work.

=== Tampa Bay Rays ===
On May 11, 2022, the Tampa Bay Rays signed Herget to a minor league deal. With the Triple-A Durham Bulls, he posted a 2.45 earned run average (ERA) in 80 2/3 innings. On August 19, the Rays selected Herget to the 40-man roster and promoted him to the major leagues for the first time. However, he was designated for assignment on August 23 and cleared waivers without appearing in a game, briefly becoming a phantom ballplayer.

He was selected again to the major league roster on September 12, and made his major league debut the next day. On September 22, Herget was designated for assignment. He again cleared waivers and was sent outright to Durham on September 26. On October 3, Herget's contract was once again selected after Easton McGee was designated for assignment. He allowed four runs in 4.1 innings pitched against the Boston Red Sox, and was designated for assignment the next day. He cleared waivers for a third time on October 6. He rounded out his rookie campaign with three major-league appearances, going 0–1 with a 7.71 ERA and 4 strikeouts in seven innings pitched. On October 14, Herget elected to become a free agent.

=== Cincinnati Reds ===
On November 10, 2022, Herget signed a minor league contract with the Cincinnati Reds organization. Herget did not make the team out of spring training and was assigned to the Triple-A Louisville Bats to begin the 2023 season.

On April 5, 2023, Herget was selected to the 40-man roster, and promoted to the active roster to replace Joel Kuhnel, who was optioned to Triple-A. On May 11, against the New York Mets, Herget entered the game in the seventh inning and pitched three scoreless innings to record his first career save. In 11 appearances for Cincinnati, he registered a 5.73 ERA with 11 strikeouts across 22 innings of work. Herget was designated for assignment by Cincinnati on June 19, after Joey Votto was activated from the injured list. He cleared waivers and was sent outright to Triple–A Louisville on June 22. On September 5, Herget was selected back to the major league roster. He was designated for assignment again on September 8. Herget cleared waivers and was sent outright to Triple–A Louisville on September 10. On October 3, he elected free agency.

=== Milwaukee Brewers ===
On February 22, 2024, Herget signed a minor league contract with the Milwaukee Brewers. He began the year with the Triple–A Nashville Sounds, logging three scoreless outings. On April 9, Herget was selected to the major league roster. He was designated for assignment on April 14 without having appeared in a game for Milwaukee. On April 18, Herget cleared waivers and was sent outright to Triple–A Nashville. On May 6, the Brewers selected Herget's contract, adding him back to the major league roster. In seven total appearances for Milwaukee, he logged a 1.59 ERA with nine strikeouts across 11 1/3 innings pitched.

=== New York Mets ===
On November 4, 2024, Herget was claimed off waivers by the New York Mets. He was optioned to the Triple-A Syracuse Mets to begin the 2025 season. Herget was 1–0 with a 3.72 ERA in Syracuse when he was called up on April 29, 2025, after José Ureña was designated for assignment. Herget entered the game in the 8th inning allowing two runs, but got through the final two innings of the Mets 8–3 win over the Arizona Diamondbacks. On April 30, Herget was optioned back to Triple-A Syracuse. He was designated for assignment on May 15.

=== Atlanta Braves ===
On May 18, 2025, Herget was claimed off waivers by the Atlanta Braves and optioned to the Triple–A Gwinnett Stripers. He made one scoreless appearance for Atlanta before being designated for assignment on July 11. Herget elected free agency after clearing waivers on July 13.

=== New York Mets (second stint) ===
On July 18, 2025, the New York Mets signed Herget to a minor league contract. The next day he was promoted to their active roster. In six total appearances for New York, he recorded a 3.00 ERA with six strikeouts over 12 innings of work. Herget was designated for assignment by the Mets on September 27. He elected free agency on September 29.

On December 18, 2025, Herget re-signed with the Mets on a minor league contract. On August 1, 2026, the Mets selected Herget's contract, adding him to their active roster. He pitched one scoreless inning of relief in a 2–6 loss to the Miami Marlins the same day. Herget was designated for assignment following the promotion of Bryce Conley on August 2. He cleared waivers and was sent outright to the Triple–A Syracuse Mets on August 4. He elected free agency on September 29.
