= Vidal Bruján =

Dominican baseball player (born 1998)

- Bruján with the Leones del Escogido in 2026

Atlanta Braves
- Utility player
- Born: February 9, 1998 (age 28); San Pedro de Macorís, Dominican Republic
- Bats: Switch Throws: Right

MLB debut
- July 7, 2021, for the Tampa Bay Rays

MLB statistics (through 2026 season)
- Batting average: .197
- Home runs: 5
- Runs batted in: 49
- Stats at Baseball Reference

Teams
- Tampa Bay Rays (2021–2023); Miami Marlins (2024); Chicago Cubs (2025); Baltimore Orioles (2025); Atlanta Braves (2025); New York Mets (2026)

Vidal Bruján Esteva (born February 9, 1998) is a Dominican professional baseball utility player in the Atlanta Braves organization. He has previously played in Major League Baseball (MLB) for the Tampa Bay Rays, Miami Marlins, Chicago Cubs, Baltimore Orioles, Atlanta Braves, and New York Mets. Bruján signed with the Rays as an international free agent in 2014, and made his MLB debut with them in 2021.

== Career ==
=== Tampa Bay Rays ===
Bruján signed with the Tampa Bay Rays as an international free agent in October 2014. He made his professional debut in 2015 with the Dominican Summer League Rays, batting .301 with two home runs, 20 RBI, and 22 stolen bases in 60 games. He split 2016 with the Gulf Coast Rays and Hudson Valley Renegades, hitting a combined .271 with one home run and eight RBI in 51 games, and played 2017 with Hudson Valley where he batted .285 with three home runs, 20 RBI, and 16 stolen bases in 67 games.

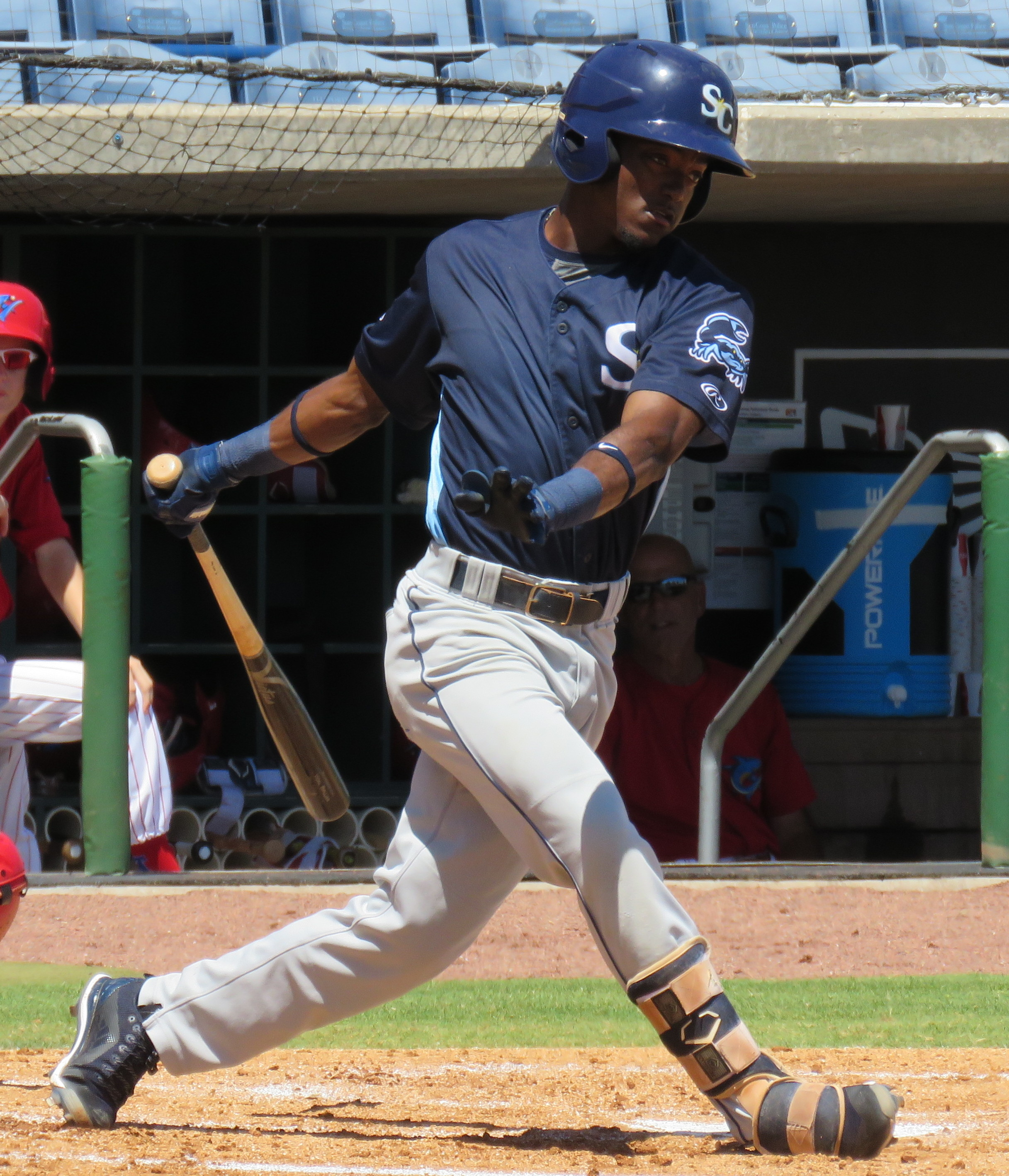
Brujan with the Charlotte Stone Crabs in 2018

Bruján played 2018 with both the Bowling Green Hot Rods (with whom he was named a Midwest League All-Star) and the Charlotte Stone Crabs where he slashed a combined .320/.403/.459 with nine home runs, 53 RBI, and 55 stolen bases in 122 games between the two clubs. He split the 2019 season between Charlotte and the Montgomery Biscuits, hitting a combined .277/.346/.389 with four home runs and 40 RBI. He played for the Salt River Rafters of the Arizona Fall League following the 2019 season.

Bruján was added to the Rays 40–man roster following the 2019 season. He did not play in a game in 2020 due to the cancellation of the minor league season caused by the COVID-19 pandemic. In June 2021, Bruján was selected to play in the All-Star Futures Game.

On July 7, 2021, Bruján was promoted to the major leagues for the first time. He made his MLB debut that day as the starting second baseman in the first game of a doubleheader against the Cleveland Indians. In the game, he recorded his first career hit, an RBI single off of Indians starter J. C. Mejía.

Bruján spent most of 2022 with the Triple-A Durham Bulls, batting .292. He did, however, play in 52 games with the Rays, and also hit his first MLB home run off Devin Smeltzer on June 10 against the Minnesota Twins.

Bruján was optioned to Triple-A Durham to begin the 2023 season. He played in 37 games for Tampa Bay, hitting just .171/.241/.197 with no home runs, six RBI, and three stolen bases.

=== Miami Marlins ===
On November 17, 2023, Bruján and Calvin Faucher were traded to the Miami Marlins in exchange for Erick Lara, Andrew Lindsey and a player to be named later. In an August 24, 2024, blowout loss against the Chicago Cubs, Bruján entered the game in the ninth inning and recorded his first career pitching strikeout against Isaac Paredes. In 102 appearances for Miami, he slashed .222/.303/.319 with two home runs, 16 RBI, and five stolen bases. Bruján was designated for assignment following the signing of Eric Wagaman on December 20.

=== Chicago Cubs ===
On December 29, 2024, the Marlins traded Bruján to the Chicago Cubs in exchange for Matt Mervis. He made 36 appearances for the Cubs, batting .222/.234/.289 with three RBI and two stolen bases. Bruján was designated for assignment by Chicago on July 30, 2025.

=== Baltimore Orioles ===
On August 3, 2025, Bruján was claimed off waivers by the Baltimore Orioles. Bruján's only appearance for the team came against the Philadelphia Phillies on August 6, where he recorded a single off of Joe Ross in his only at-bat.

=== Atlanta Braves ===
On August 8, 2025, Bruján was claimed off waivers by the Atlanta Braves. He made 23 appearances for Atlanta, batting .268/.362/.317 with five RBI. Bruján was designated for assignment by the Braves following the acquisition of Ken Waldichuk on January 8, 2026.

=== New York Mets ===
On January 14, 2026, Bruján was claimed off waivers by the Minnesota Twins. He was designated for assignment by the Twins on January 21. The Twins traded him to the New York Mets in exchange for cash considerations the following day. On March 25, Bruján was designated for assignment by the Mets. He cleared waivers and was sent outright to the Triple-A Syracuse Mets on March 27. On May 3, the Mets selected Bruján's contract, adding him to their active roster. He made nine appearances for New York, going 1-for-11 (.091) with one RBI and one walk. Bruján was designated for assignment for a second time on June 16. He cleared waivers and was sent outright to Triple-A Syracuse two days later. On October 15, Bruján elected free agency.

=== Atlanta Braves (second stint) ===
On October 30, 2026, Bruján signed a minor league contract with the Atlanta Braves.

== Personal life ==
Bruján's father, Vidal Sr., died from heart failure in 2018.
