= Calvin Faucher =

American baseball player (born 1995)

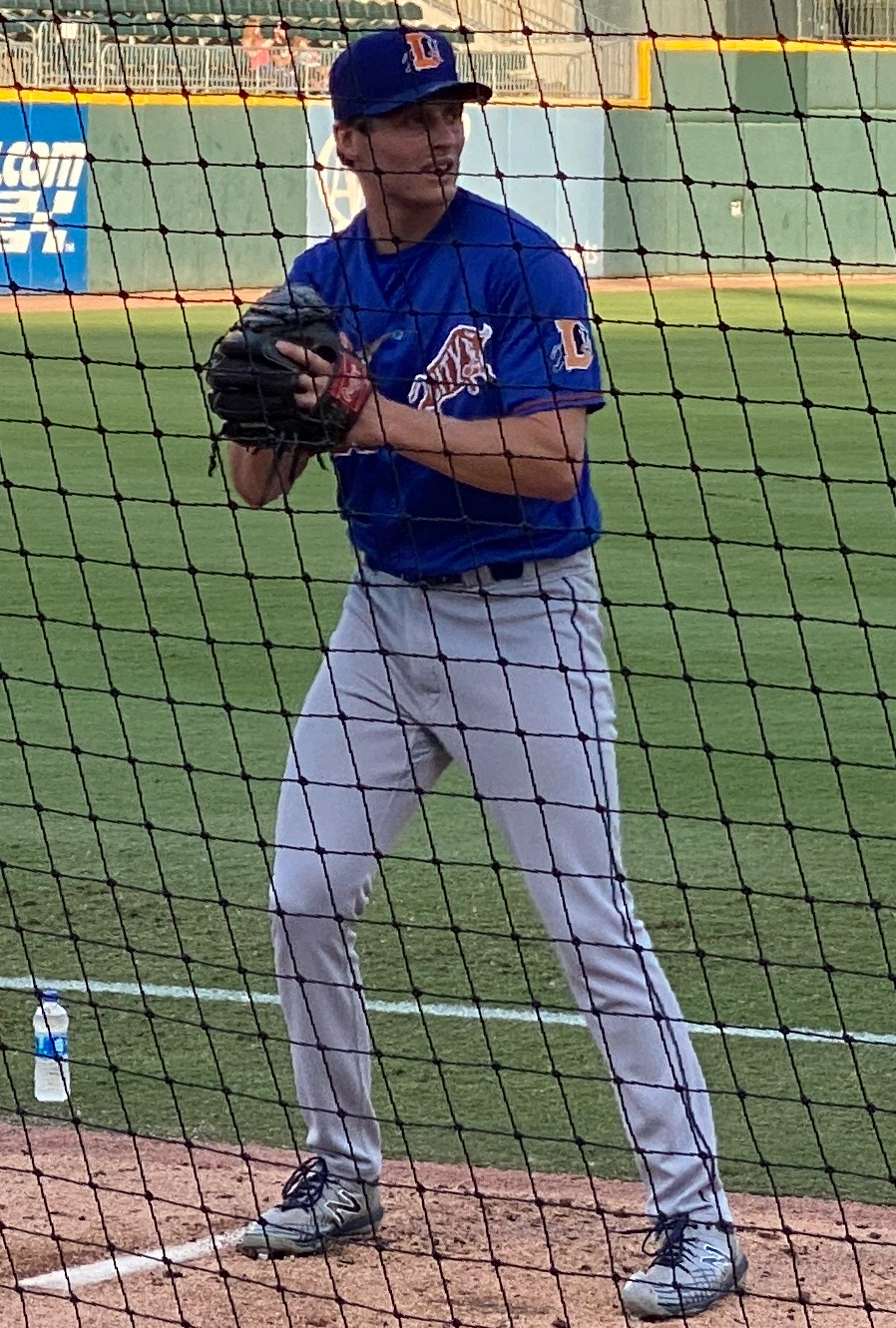
- Faucher with the Durham Bulls in 2021

Miami Marlins – No. 53
- Pitcher
- Born: September 22, 1995 (age 31); Chula Vista, California, U.S.
- Bats: Right Throws: Right

MLB debut
- May 9, 2022, for the Tampa Bay Rays

MLB statistics (through 2026 season)
- Win–loss record: 14–16
- Earned run average: 3.96
- Strikeouts: 241
- Stats at Baseball Reference

Teams
- Tampa Bay Rays (2022–2023); Miami Marlins (2024–present)

Calvin Louis Faucher (/foʊˈʃeɪ/ foh-SHAY; born September 22, 1995) is an American professional baseball pitcher for the Miami Marlins of Major League Baseball (MLB). He has previously played in MLB for the Tampa Bay Rays.

== Amateur career ==
Faucher attended Hilltop High School in Chula Vista, California. He played for the school's baseball team as a pitcher. In 2012, he had a 1.05 earned run average (ERA) as a junior. Faucher played college baseball at Southwestern College and the University of California, Irvine. In 2016, he played collegiate summer baseball with the Yarmouth–Dennis Red Sox of the Cape Cod Baseball League, where he was used as a closer and helped the club win its third consecutive league title.

== Professional career ==
=== Minnesota Twins ===
The Minnesota Twins selected Faucher in the 10th round of the 2017 MLB draft with the 286th pick. Faucher made his professional debut with the rookie-level Elizabethton Twins. In 2018, Faucher split the season between the High-A Fort Myers Miracle and the Single-A Cedar Rapids Kernels, pitching to a cumulative 4.09 ERA with 62 strikeouts in 36 games between the two teams. The following season, Faucher returned to Fort Myers, logging a 4.42 ERA with 61 strikeouts in 34 games. Faucher did not play in a game in 2020 due to the cancellation of the minor league season because of the COVID-19 pandemic. Faucher began the 2021 season with the Double-A Wichita Wind Surge, but struggled to a 7.04 ERA in 19 games.

=== Tampa Bay Rays ===
On July 22, 2021, Faucher was traded to the Rays, alongside Nelson Cruz, for Joe Ryan and Drew Strotman. Faucher improved his performance down the stretch, tossing 4.2 scoreless innings in 2 games for the Double-A Montgomery Biscuits and recording a 1.77 ERA in 20.1 innings across 11 contests for the Triple-A Durham Bulls.

He was selected to the 40-man roster following the season on November 19, 2021. On May 9, 2022, Faucher was promoted to the Rays' major league roster. He made his major league debut that day. On September 27, Faucher collected his first career save, pitching the eleventh inning against the Cleveland Guardians and holding them to an unearned run.

In 2023, Faucher made 17 appearances for the Rays, but struggled to a 7.01 ERA with 25 strikeouts in 25 2/3 innings pitched. On August 21, 2023, he was placed on the injured list with biceps tendinitis. On September 24, Faucher was transferred to the 60–day injured list, ending his season. On November 14, Faucher was designated for assignment after multiple prospects were added to the roster.

=== Miami Marlins ===
On November 17, 2023, Faucher and Vidal Bruján were traded to the Miami Marlins in exchange for Erick Lara, Andrew Lindsey and a player to be named later. He was optioned to the Triple–A Jacksonville Jumbo Shrimp to begin the 2024 season.
