= Javy Guerra (baseball, born 1995) =

Panamanian baseball player (born 1995)

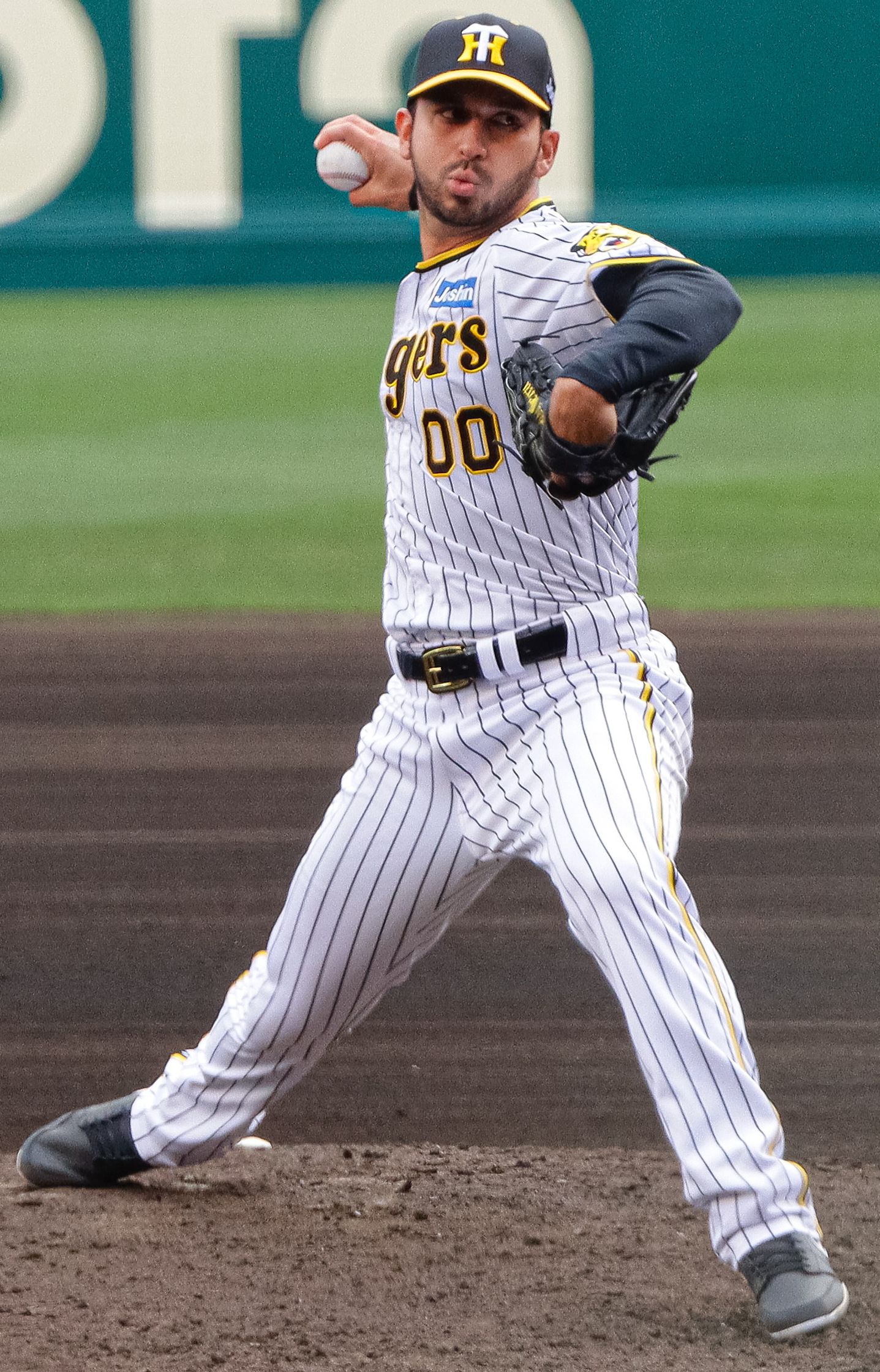
- Guerra with the Hanshin Tigers in 2024

Free agent
- Pitcher
- Born: September 25, 1995 (age 31); David, Panama
- Bats: Left Throws: Right

Professional debut
- MLB: May 4, 2018, for the San Diego Padres
- NPB: March 30, 2024, for the Hanshin Tigers

MLB statistics (through 2023 season)
- Win–loss record: 3–1
- Earned run average: 6.43
- Strikeouts: 45

NPB statistics (through 2025 season)
- Win–loss record: 1-5
- Earned run average: 2.44
- Strikeouts: 52
- Saves: 14
- Stats at Baseball Reference

Teams
- San Diego Padres (2018–2022); Tampa Bay Rays (2022); Milwaukee Brewers (2023); Tampa Bay Rays (2023); Hanshin Tigers (2024–2025)

Javier Alexis Guerra [gayr'rah] (born September 25, 1995) is a Panamanian professional baseball pitcher who is a free agent. Guerra began his career as an infielder, reaching MLB as such in 2018 with the San Diego Padres, before converting to pitching in 2019. He has also played in Major League Baseball (MLB) for the Tampa Bay Rays and Milwaukee Brewers, and in Nippon Professional Baseball (NPB) for the Hanshin Tigers.

== Professional career ==
=== Boston Red Sox ===
Guerra signed as a shortstop with the Boston Red Sox as an international free agent in 2012, coming to terms on a contract calling for a reported signing bonus of $250,000. At the time Guerra drew mixed reviews for his defense because he had fringy speed, but he showed a very quick first step and excellent range to both sides. He had very soft but quick hands and was assured in the field, which complemented his arm, perhaps the strongest in the Red Sox system.

Guerra made his professional debut with the Rookie league Dominican Summer League Red Sox in 2013, hitting .248/.356/.290 with nine doubles and 23 runs batted in in 60 games. He then played for the Rookie league Gulf Coast Red Sox in 2014, batting .269/.286/.408 with two home runs and 26 RBI in the Gulf Coast League.

Guerra had a breakout season with the Single-A Greenville Drive in 2015, where he displayed highlight-reel defensive plays at shortstop with the ability to drive the ball. Guerra put up a .279/.329/.449 slash line with 68 RBI, along with 23 doubles, three triples and 15 home runs in a career-high 116 games, while earning a selection to the South Atlantic League All-Star Game. In addition, Guerra ranked among the best hitters in the Red Sox system, ending second in home runs, third in RBI and total bases (195), fourth in slugging (.449) and fifth in runs scored (64). On defense, he made 27 errors at shortstop, and had a .954 fielding percentage.

=== San Diego Padres ===
On November 13, 2015, the Red Sox traded Guerra, Carlos Asuaje, Manuel Margot, and Logan Allen to the San Diego Padres for Craig Kimbrel. Guerra spent 2016 with the High-A Lake Elsinore Storm, where he batted .202/.264/.325 with nine home runs and 41 RBIs in 105 games, as on defense he made 30 errors at shortstop and had a .940 fielding percentage. The Padres added him to their 40-man roster after the 2016 season.

He spent 2017 with Lake Elsinore and the Double-A San Antonio Missions, batting .222/.266/.349 with nine home runs and 53 RBIs in 128 games between both teams. He began 2018 with the Triple-A El Paso Chihuahuas, for whom he batted .223/.269/.398 in 122 games. Through 2018, in 582 minor league games, he had batted .237/.290/.374, while playing nearly all the games at shortstop.

Guerra was called up to the majors for the first time on May 4, 2018 and made his MLB debut that night. In 16 at-bats in 2018 with the Padres, he batted .125 with one RBI.

==== Conversion to pitcher ====
During 2019 spring training, Guerra was converted from a shortstop to a relief pitcher. Guerra opened the season on the injured list due to an oblique injury. After being activated, he was assigned to Lake Elsinore. He was promoted to the Amarillo Sod Poodles on August 20. On September 1, Guerra was promoted to the major leagues as a pitcher for the first time.

In 2020, Guerra pitched to a 1-0 record with a 10.13 ERA and 12 strikeouts in 13.1 innings of work across 14 appearances. On April 5, 2021, Guerra was placed on the 60-day injured list with a grade 1 UCL sprain. On September 21, Guerra was activated off of the injured list.

On April 13, 2022, Guerra was designated for assignment by the Padres following the waiver claim of Kyle Tyler. He had allowed four runs in 2 innings pitched two days prior against the Arizona Diamondbacks, his only appearance for the Padres in 2022.

=== Tampa Bay Rays ===
On April 16, 2022, the Padres traded Guerra to the Tampa Bay Rays for cash. He pitched to an 8.44 ERA across six appearances for the Rays before he was designated for assignment on May 1. On May 6, Guerra cleared waivers and was outrighted to the Durham Bulls. He was promoted back to the active roster on June 30. Guerra was returned to Triple-A on July 4. He had his contract selected once more on September 12. On November 15, Guerra was designated for assignment.

=== Milwaukee Brewers ===
On November 18, 2022, the Rays traded Guerra to the Milwaukee Brewers for a player to be named later. He made 8 appearances for Milwaukee in 2023, struggling to an 8.64 ERA with 5 strikeouts in 8 1/3 innings pitched. On April 24, 2023, Guerra was designated for assignment by Milwaukee following the promotion of Alex Claudio.

=== Tampa Bay Rays (second stint) ===
On April 29, 2023, Guerra was traded back to the Tampa Bay Rays for cash. In 6 appearances for the Rays, Guerra surrendered 2 runs across 5 innings pitched (3.60 ERA), walking 9 and striking out 4. On May 14, Guerra was designated for assignment. He cleared waivers and was sent outright to the Triple-A Durham Bulls on May 17. On July 8, the Rays selected Guerra back to the major league roster. In 3 games for Tampa Bay, he allowed three earned runs on three hits and four walks. On July 19, Guerra was again designated for assignment. On October 9, Guerra elected free agency.

=== Hanshin Tigers ===
On November 18, 2023, Guerra signed with the Hanshin Tigers of Nippon Professional Baseball (NPB). He made 59 appearances for the Tigers in 2024, compiling a 1-4 record and 1.55 ERA with 48 strikeouts and 14 saves over 58 innings of work.

Guerra made six appearances for Hanshin during the 2025 campaign, but struggled to an 0-1 record and 13.50 ERA with four strikeouts across 4 2/3 innings pitched. He became a free agent following the season.

=== Atlanta Braves ===
On January 2, 2026, Guerra signed a minor league contract with the Atlanta Braves. In 16 games for the Triple-A Gwinnett Stripers, he logged a 5.68 ERA and 17 strikeouts across 25 1/3 innings pitched. Guerra was released by the Braves on June 11.

=== Chicago White Sox ===
On June 13, 2026, Guerra signed a minor league contract with the Chicago White Sox. He made 10 appearances for the Triple–A Charlotte Knights, posting an 0–2 record and 3.09 ERA with 16 strikeouts and two saves across 11 2/3 innings pitched. Guerra was released by the White Sox organization on August 8.

== International career ==
On August 13, 2022, Guerra was to the Panama national baseball team roster for the 2023 World Baseball Classic qualifiers, played at Estadio Nacional Rod Carew in Panama City. He pitched for Panama in the 2023 World Baseball Classic, earning a save and not allowing a run in 2 appearances.
