= Phoenix Sanders =

American baseball player (born 1995)

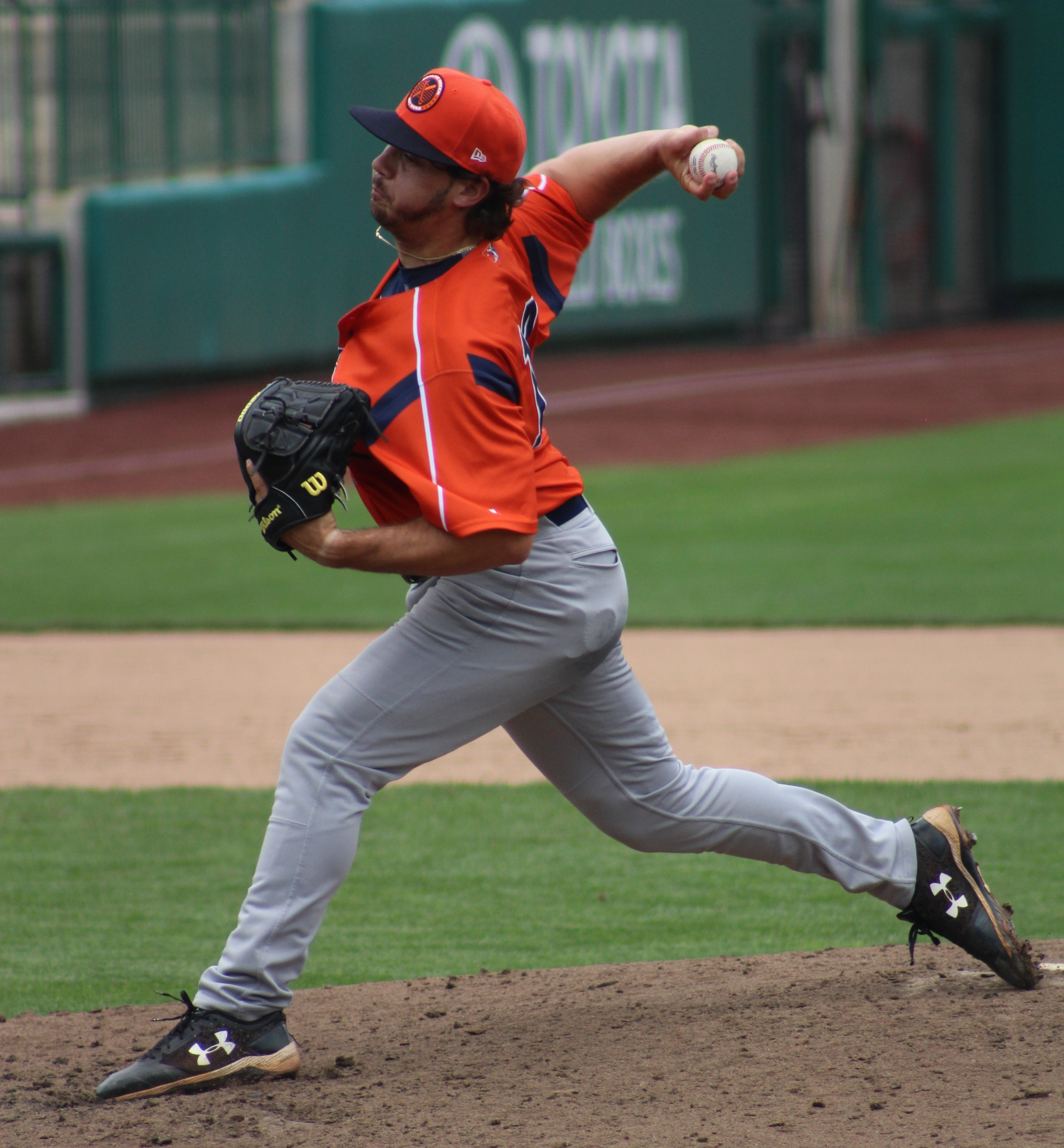
- Sanders with the Bowling Green Hot Rods in 2018
- Pitcher
- Born: June 5, 1995 (age 31); Augsburg, Germany
- Batted: Right Threw: Right

MLB debut
- April 14, 2022, for the Tampa Bay Rays

Last MLB appearance
- July 10, 2022, for the Tampa Bay Rays

MLB statistics
- Win–loss record: 0–0
- Earned run average: 3.07
- Strikeouts: 12
- Stats at Baseball Reference

Teams
- Tampa Bay Rays (2022)

Phoenix Clark Sanders (born June 5, 1995) is an American former professional baseball pitcher. He played college baseball for Daytona State College and the University of South Florida. He played in Major League Baseball (MLB) for the Tampa Bay Rays.

== Early life and amateur career ==
Sanders was born in Augsburg, Bavaria, Germany. His parents are Kevin and Lorea, his two brothers are Dallas and Hudson, and his sister is Brooklyn. He grew up in Orlando, Florida. He attended Buchholz High School when his family moved to Gainesville, Florida in 2009. He was a member of the varsity baseball team in his final two years and won seven games with a 0.55 ERA as a senior.

Sanders began his college baseball career at Daytona State College after not receiving any NCAA Division I scholarship offers out of high school. As a freshman, he made 12 starts in which he was 4–6 with a 3.17 ERA. He played collegiate summer baseball for the Willmar Stingers of the Northwoods League after his freshman season and had a 1–0 record over three starts with a 1.89 ERA and 14 strikeouts in 13 innings. He was named to the Northwood’s League 200 Top Prospect list by College Baseball Daily. As a sophomore, Sanders made 16 appearances with 14 starts and three complete games, and went 6–6 with a 2.50 ERA and 71 strikeouts.

After the season, Sanders transferred to the University of South Florida for his remaining collegiate eligibility. As a junior in 2016, he was 5–5 with a 4.15 ERA and 95 strikeouts (5th in the conference) in 95.1 innings. As a senior, Sanders was 6–2 with a 2.78 ERA and 109 strikeouts (2nd in the conference) in 97 innings over 16 starts, with 4.36 strikeouts per walk (2nd). He was named 2017 All-American Athletic Conference Second Team.

== Professional career ==
=== Tampa Bay Rays ===
Sanders was selected in the 10th round of the 2017 Major League Baseball draft by the Tampa Bay Rays. After signing with the team for a signing bonus of $7,500, he was assigned to the rookie-level Princeton Rays, with whom he was 2–3 with a 4.42 ERA in 38 2/3 innings in which he struck out 40 batters. Sanders began the 2018 season with the Single-A Bowling Green Hot Rods, where he was 5–3 with three saves and had a 3.02 ERA and struck out 71 batters in 50 2/3 innings (12.6 strikeouts per 9 innings) over 28 relief appearances, before being promoted to the Charlotte Stone Crabs of the High-A Florida State League with whom he was 1–1 with a 3.29 ERA in 13 2/3 innings.

Sanders was assigned to the Double-A Montgomery Biscuits at the start of the 2019 season, for whom he was a Southern League Mid-Season All Star, after pitching in 37 games and posting a 3–3 record with 15 saves (2nd in the league) and a 1.81 ERA, with 57 strikeouts in 49 2/3 innings (10.3 strikeouts per 9 innings). He was then promoted to the Triple-A Durham Bulls, with whom he was 1–0 with a 2.38 ERA in 11 1/3 innings. Sanders was invited to Rays' spring training as a non-roster invitee in 2020 but was eventually reassigned to the minor leagues. Sanders did not play in a game in 2020 due to the cancellation of the Minor League Baseball season because of the COVID-19 pandemic.

Sanders returned to Durham for the 2021 season. He had a 5–2 record with two saves and a 3.38 ERA and 80 strikeouts in 64 innings pitched (11.3 strikeouts per 9 innings) over 50 relief appearances (2nd in the league), 1.5 walks per 9 innings pitched (5th), an 0.906 WHIP (6th), and 7.27 strikeouts/walk (4th).

Sanders was promoted to the Rays major league roster on April 14, 2022. He made his MLB debut the same day, giving up one earned run and striking out two batters in three innings pitched in a 3–6 loss to the Oakland Athletics. He was designated for assignment on August 22. For the season, he was 0–0 with a 3.07 ERA in 14 2/3 innings.

=== Baltimore Orioles ===
On August 24, 2022, Sanders was claimed off waivers by the Baltimore Orioles. On September 3, Sanders was designated for assignment and was sent outright to the Triple-A Norfolk Tides.

Sanders began the 2023 season with Triple-A Norfolk, making 9 relief appearances and registering a 2.00 ERA with 11 strikeouts in 9 innings pitched. On May 19, 2023, Sanders was released by the Orioles organization.

=== San Francisco Giants ===
On May 24, 2023, Sanders signed a minor league contract with the San Francisco Giants organization. In 13 games for the Triple–A Sacramento River Cats, he struggled to an 8.16 ERA with 12 strikeouts in 14 1/3 innings pitched. On July 14, Sanders was released by the Giants.

=== Gastonia Baseball Club ===
On April 18, 2024, Sanders signed with the Gastonia Baseball Club of the Atlantic League of Professional Baseball. In 24 games for Gastonia, he compiled a 1.73 ERA with 33 strikeouts and 12 saves across 26 innings pitched. On July 16, Sanders was released by Gastonia.

On January 29, 2025, Sanders announced his retirement from professional baseball.
