= Easton McGee =

American baseball player (born 1997)

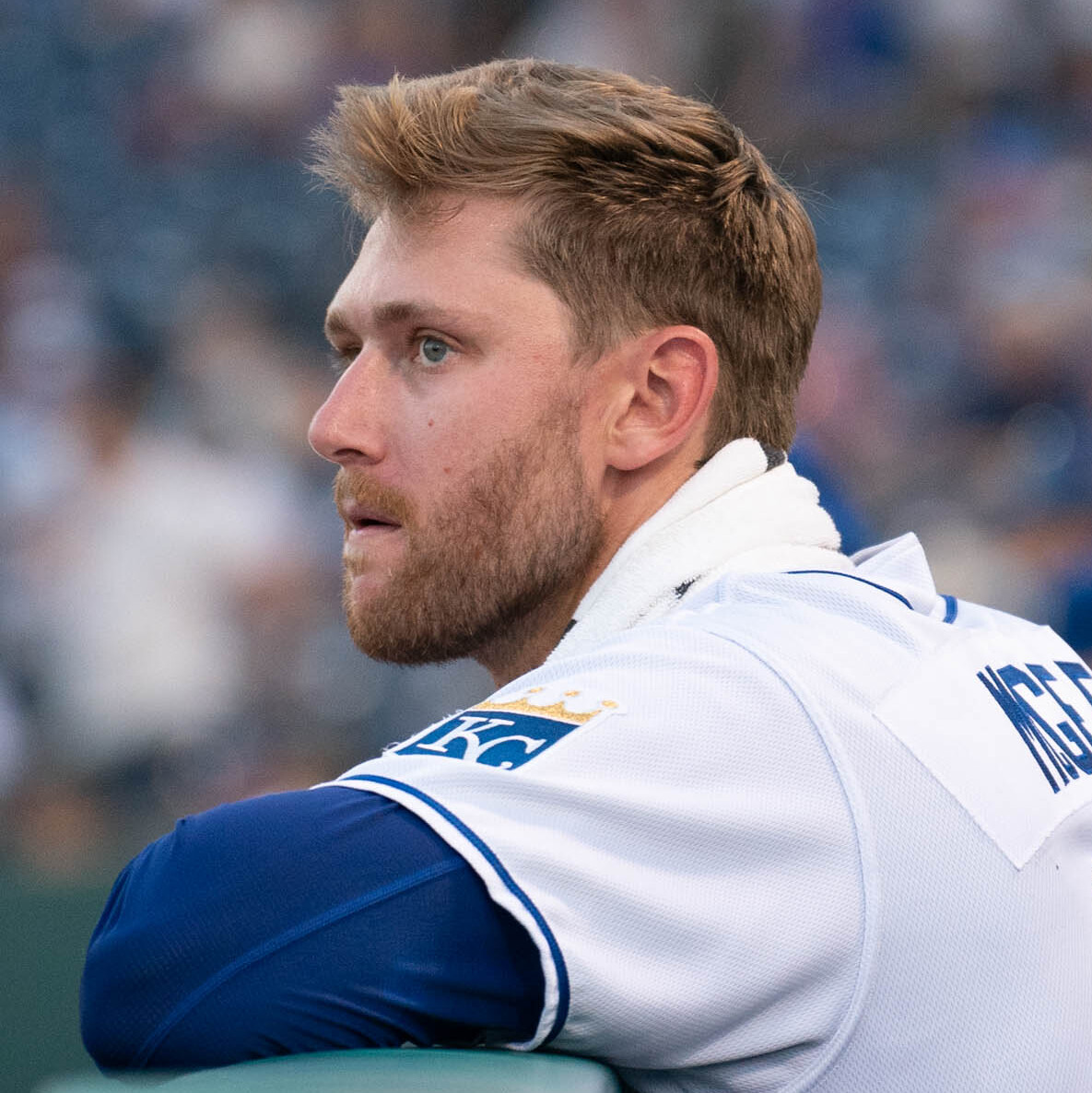
- McGee with the Omaha Storm Chasers in 2026

Hiroshima Toyo Carp
- Pitcher
- Born: December 26, 1997 (age 28); Hopkinsville, Kentucky, U.S.
- Bats: Right Throws: Right

MLB debut
- October 2, 2022, for the Tampa Bay Rays

MLB statistics (through 2026 season)
- Win–loss record: 0–0
- Earned run average: 4.54
- Strikeouts: 25
- Stats at Baseball Reference

Teams
- Tampa Bay Rays (2022); Seattle Mariners (2023); Milwaukee Brewers (2025–2026); Kansas City Royals (2026)

Easton Michael McGee (born December 26, 1997) is an American professional baseball pitcher for the Hiroshima Toyo Carp of Nippon Professional Baseball (NPB). He has previously played in Major League Baseball (MLB)for the Tampa Bay Rays, Seattle Mariners, Milwaukee Brewers, and Kansas City Royals.

== Career ==
=== Tampa Bay Rays ===
McGee played high school baseball for Hopkinsville High School in his hometown of Hopkinsville, Kentucky. He committed to play college baseball for the Kentucky Wildcats, but was selected by the Tampa Bay Rays in the fourth round of the 2016 MLB draft. He made his professional debut that season with the rookie-level Gulf Coast League Rays, then spent 2017 with the Princeton Rays of the Appalachian League. McGee advanced to Low-A in 2018 with the Hudson Valley Renegades, then Single-A in 2019 with the Bowling Green Hot Rods. He did not play in a game in 2020 due to the cancellation of the minor league season because of the COVID-19 pandemic. McGee split the 2021 season between Double-A with the Montgomery Biscuits and Triple-A with the Durham Bulls.

McGee returned to Durham for the 2022 season, pitching to a 6–9 record with a 5.43 earned run average (ERA) in 27 games (22 starts). On September 29, 2022, McGee was selected to the 40-man roster and promoted to the major leagues for the first time. He made his major-league debut with the Rays on October 2, pitching three innings while allowing one unearned run on four hits. The following day, McGee was designated for assignment following the promotion of Kevin Herget.

=== Seattle Mariners ===
On October 5, 2022, McGee was claimed off waivers by the Boston Red Sox. On November 9, McGee was acquired by the Seattle Mariners in exchange for cash considerations. McGee was optioned to the Triple-A Tacoma Rainiers to begin the 2023 season. On April 29, McGee made his Mariners debut, tossing 6 2/3 scoreless innings against the Toronto Blue Jays while allowing only one hit and one walk. On May 22, it was announced that McGee would likely undergo Tommy John surgery, ending his season. Following the season on October 31, McGee was removed from the 40–man roster and sent outright to Triple–A Tacoma. He elected free agency on November 6.

=== Milwaukee Brewers ===
On November 28, 2023, McGee signed a two-year, minor league contract with the Milwaukee Brewers organization. He made 16 appearances in 2024 for the rookie-level Arizona Complex League Brewers and Triple-A Nashville Sounds, accumulating a 2–2 record and 6.21 ERA with 32 strikeouts across 33 1/3 innings pitched.

McGee began the 2025 campaign with Nashville, recording a 3.44 ERA with 20 strikeouts over his first 13 appearances. On May 18, 2025, the Brewers selected McGee's contract, adding him to their active roster. He made nine appearances for the Brewers, recording a 5.52 ERA with 13 strikeouts across 14 2/3 innings pitched.

McGee was optioned to Triple-A Nashville to begin the 2026 season. He made two scoreless appearances for Milwaukee, recording one strikeout over two innings of work. On July 10, 2026, McGee was designated for assignment by the Brewers.

=== Kansas City Royals ===
On July 14, 2026, McGee was traded to the Kansas City Royals in exchange for cash considerations. He made seven appearances for the Royals, struggling to an 8.68 ERA with eight strikeouts across 9 1/3 innings pitched. On October 23, McGee was removed from the 40–man roster and sent outright to the minors, and subsequently elected free agency.

=== Hiroshima Toyo Carp ===
On November 9, 2026, McGee signed with the Hiroshima Toyo Carp of Nippon Professional Baseball.
