= Shane McClanahan =

American baseball player (born 1997)

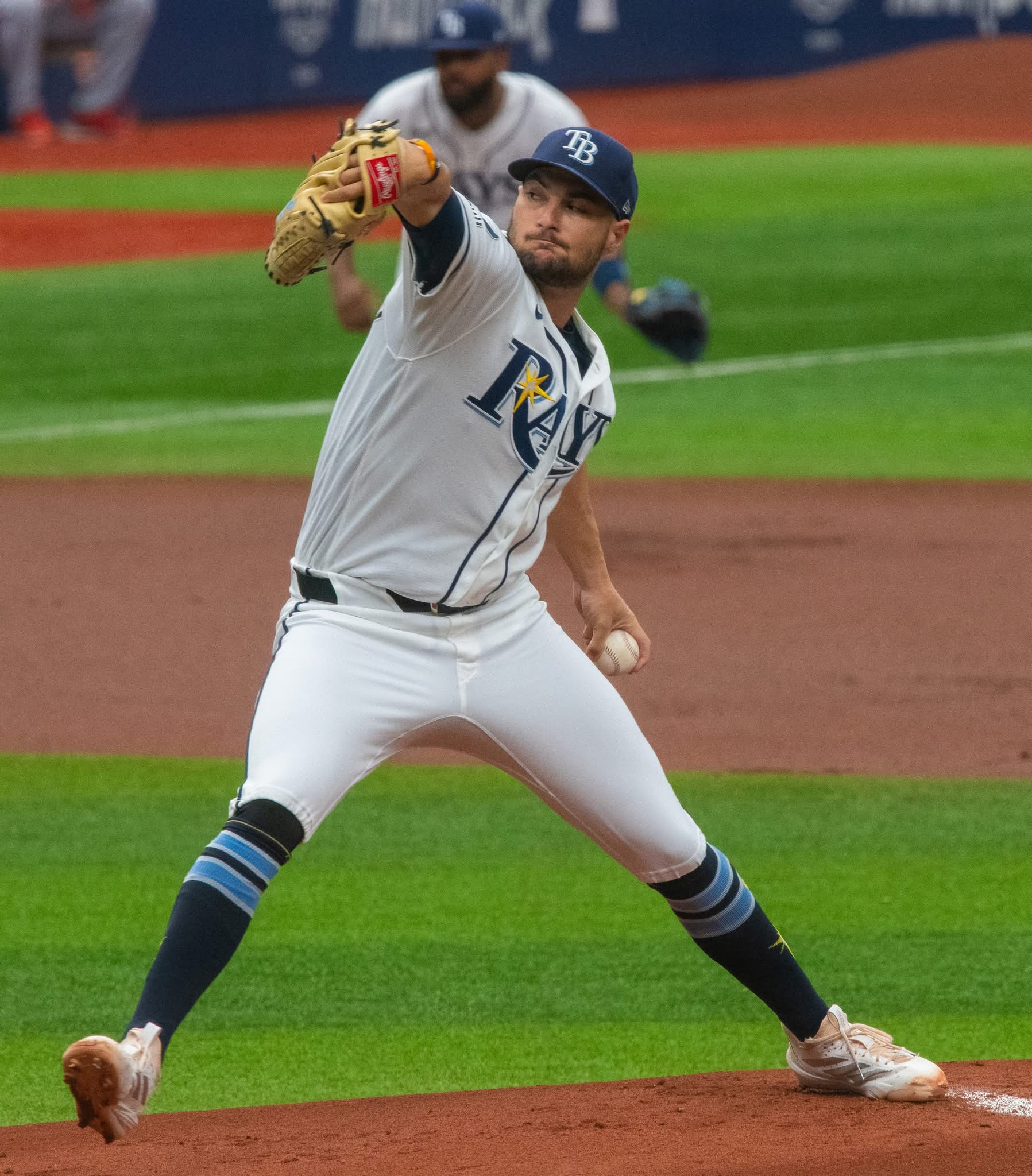
- McClanahan with the Tampa Bay Rays in 2026

Tampa Bay Rays – No. 18
- Pitcher
- Born: April 28, 1997 (age 29); Baltimore, Maryland, U.S.
- Bats: Left Throws: Left

MLB debut
- October 5, 2020, for the Tampa Bay Rays

MLB statistics (through 2026 season)
- Win–loss record: 43–23
- Earned run average: 3.10
- Strikeouts: 562
- Stats at Baseball Reference

Teams
- Tampa Bay Rays (2020–2023, 2026–present)

Career highlights and awards
- 2× All-Star (2022, 2023)

Shane Peter McClanahan (born April 28, 1997) is an American professional baseball pitcher for the Tampa Bay Rays of Major League Baseball (MLB). He made his MLB debut in 2020 and was an All-Star in 2022 and 2023.

== Early life ==
McClanahan was born in Baltimore, Maryland, and lived there until age five. He grew up a fan of the Baltimore Orioles and idolized Cal Ripken Jr.; his number 18 jersey with the Rays is in honor of Ripken's number 8.

He attended Cape Coral High School in Cape Coral, Florida. McClanahan went from throwing 82–84 miles per hour (132–135 km/h) in his junior year to throwing in the low 90s after hitting a growth spurt, which brought him from 5 feet 6 inches (1.68 m) to 6 feet (1.83 m) between his junior and senior year. During his high school career he had 29–7 win–loss record with a 1.02 earned run average (ERA) and 187 strikeouts in 123 innings pitched. He was drafted by the New York Mets in the 26th round of the 2015 Major League Baseball draft. He did not sign with the Mets and attended the University of South Florida (USF) for the South Florida Bulls.

== College career ==
McClanahan did not play his freshman year at USF in 2016, after undergoing Tommy John surgery. He returned from the injury in 2017, going 4–2 with a 3.20 ERA and 104 strikeouts in 15 starts as a redshirt freshman. In 2018, McClanahan made 14 starts for USF tallying a league best 120 strikeouts, while going 5–6 with a 3.42 ERA. McClanahan's 120 strikeouts rank fourth on USF's single-season list along with allowing just 6.01 hits per nine innings in 2018, ranking 18th in the country. McClanahan was part of USF's first combined no-hitter against Army on March 16, 2018, a game in which he struck out a career high 15 hitters becoming just the second USF pitcher to strike out 100 or more in back-to-back seasons.

Entering the 2018 MLB draft, McClanahan was considered one of the top prospects available in the draft.

== Professional career ==
=== Minor Leagues ===
The Tampa Bay Rays selected McClanahan with the 31st overall selection in the 2018 Major League Baseball draft. He signed with the Rays for a $2,230,100 signing bonus. He made his professional debut with the rookie-level Gulf Coast League Rays and was promoted to the Princeton Rays in mid-August. In seven innings pitched between the two teams, he did not give up a run. He began 2019 with the Bowling Green Hot Rods, was their Opening Day starter, and earned Midwest League All-Star honors. He was promoted to the Charlotte Stone Crabs in June after posting a 4–4 record in 11 appearances (10 starts) with a 3.40 ERA and 74 strikeouts in 53 innings pitched.

=== Tampa Bay Rays ===
==== 2020–2021 ====
McClanahan was selected to the 40-man roster and added to the Rays' Wild Card roster ahead of their series vs the Toronto Blue Jays on September 29, 2020. He made his debut on October 5, against the Yankees in the 2020 American League Division Series (ALDS), becoming the first pitcher to have their debut in the postseason and fifth player overall, following Alex Kirilloff, Adalberto Mondesi, Mark Kiger, and Bug Holliday.

On April 28, 2021, the Rays promoted McClanahan to the major leagues. He made his regular season debut against the Oakland Athletics pitching four innings, allowing two runs with five strikeouts. On September 11, 2021, McClanahan was placed on the 10-day IL with back tightness. He was activated on September 19. He finished the 2021 season going 10–6 record with a 3.43 ERA and 141 strikeouts in 123 1/3 innings.

==== 2022 season ====
The Rays named McClanahan as the Opening Day starter for the 2022 season. On April 24, McClanahan took a no-hitter into the seventh inning against the Boston Red Sox. On April 30, McClanahan had a career high 11 strikeouts in five innings against the Minnesota Twins. On May 11, McClanahan pitched seven shut out innings and striking out 11 against the Los Angeles Angels. He won the American League Player of the Week Award for the week of May 8–14.

McClanahan was selected to the 2022 MLB All-Star Game, after ending the first half of the season 10–3 with a 1.72 ERA and 147 strikeouts. McClanahan was named the starting pitcher for the American League in the All-Star game. He pitched 1 innings allowing 2 runs on 4 hits. On August 31, McClanahan was placed on the 15-day IL due to a left shoulder impingement. He was activated from the IL on September 15.

McClanahan finished the 2022 regular season pitching 166.1 innings, going 12–8 with 194 strikeouts and a 2.54 ERA. He finished second in WHIP and third in batting average against, finishing behind Justin Verlander in the first category and Verlander and Dylan Cease in the second.

==== 2023 season ====
McClanahan was the Rays' Opening Day starter for the second year in a row, where he pitched six innings of shutout ball against the Detroit Tigers. On May 19, he pitched six no-hit innings against the Milwaukee Brewers. McClanahan won the American League's Player of the Week Award for the week of May 15–21. On May 24, he became the third Rays pitcher to begin a season 8–0, tying Matt Moore in 2013, and Charlie Morton in 2019. In the month of May, McClanahan went 3–1 with a AL-leading 2.03 ERA and 40 strikeouts, earning him the American League Pitcher of the Month Award. On July 1, McClanahan was placed on the 15-day injured list due to back tightness.

On July 2, McClanahan was selected to appear in the 2023 MLB All-Star Game, the second of his career. However, McClanahan did not participate in the game due to previously being placed on the injured list for mid-back tightness. He was placed on the 60–day injured list with a left arm injury on August 12. The move ended his season, in which he made 21 starts and posted an 11–2 record, a 3.29 ERA and 121 strikeouts in 115 innings of work. McClanahan underwent Tommy John surgery later that month.

==== 2025 season ====
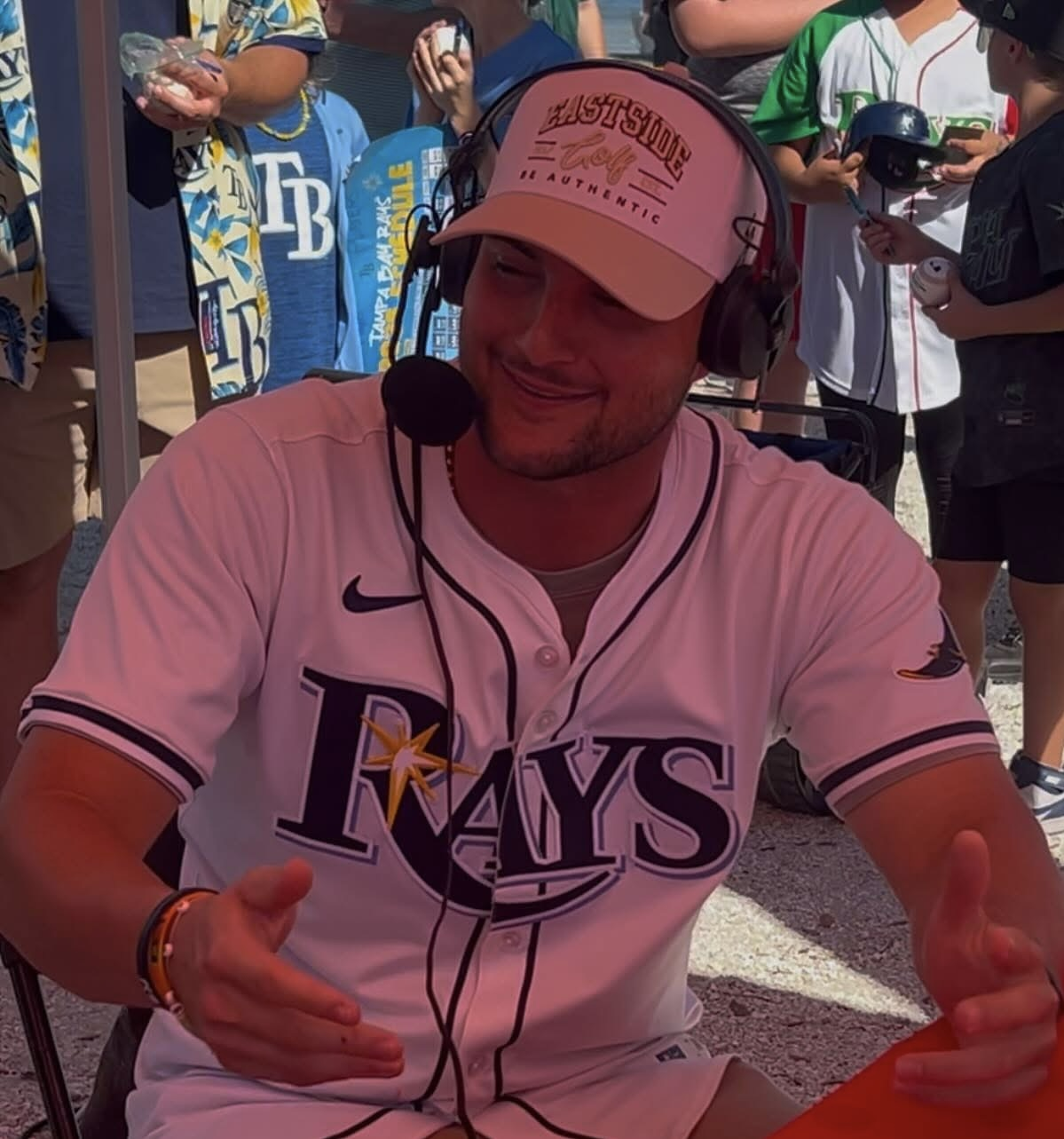
McClanahan with the Rays in 2025

After missing the entire 2024 season, McClanahan was set to return to the majors as the Rays' 2025 Opening Day starter, but he suffered a triceps injury while pitching against the Boston Red Sox in spring training and began the season on the IL. He was transferred to the 60-day injured list on April 26. On August 11, the team announced he would miss the rest of the season after undergoing a procedure around the nerves.

== Pitching style ==
McClanahan's standard pitching repertoire includes a four-seam fastball, a changeup, a curveball, and a slider. Though perhaps best known for his fastball, which regularly tops 97 mph, his arsenal is relatively varied; in 2023, he threw all four of his pitches no less than 14 percent of the time.

McClanahan has said he admires pitchers like Greg Maddux (who he called a "master of efficiency") and Cliff Lee for their ability to locate and sequence pitches.

== Personal life ==
McClanahan is in a relationship with soccer player Andrea Rán Snæfeld Hauksdóttir, who currently plays for the USL Super League side Tampa Bay Sun. The couple met while they attended college at the University of South Florida.
