= 2023 Seattle Mariners season =

2023 Seattle Mariners
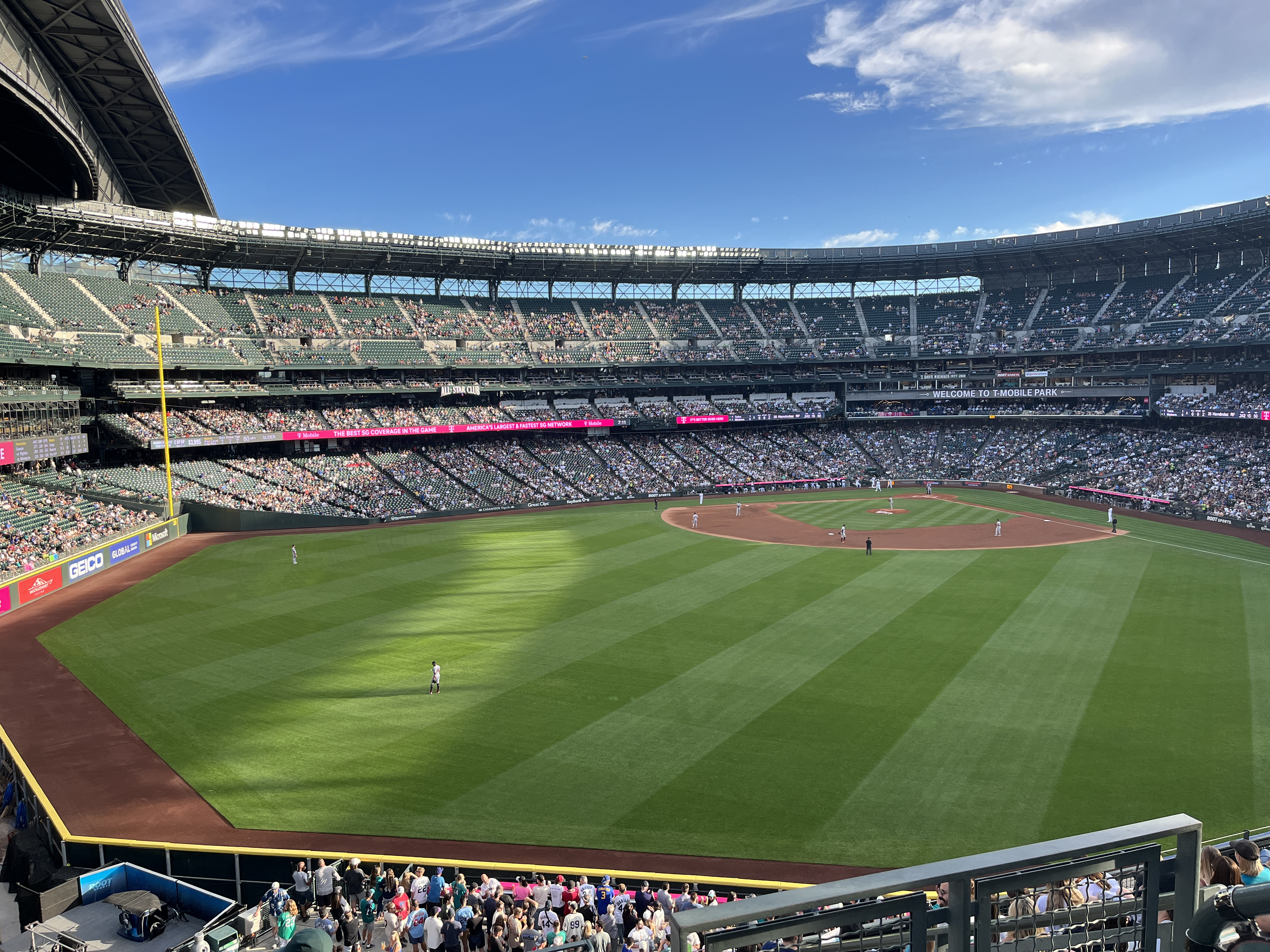
- T-Mobile Park in July 2023
- League: American League
- Division: West
- Ballpark: T-Mobile Park
- City: Seattle, Washington
- Record: 88–74 (.543)
- Divisional place: 3rd
- Owners: Baseball Club of Seattle, LP, represented by CEO John Stanton
- President of baseball operations: Jerry Dipoto
- Manager: Scott Servais
- Average attendance: 33,215
- Television: Root Sports Northwest (Dave Sims, Aaron Goldsmith, Mike Blowers)
- Radio: ESPN-710; Seattle Mariners Radio Network (Rick Rizzs, Aaron Goldsmith, Dave Sims)

The 2023 Seattle Mariners season was the 47th season in franchise history. The Mariners played their 24th full season (25th overall) at T-Mobile Park, their home ballpark in Seattle, Washington. After making the playoffs in 2022 and having a 90.2% chance to make the playoffs on September 2 while in first place in the American League (AL) West, the Mariners missed the postseason. The Mariners drew an average home attendance of 33,215 in 81 home games, the 10th highest in Major League Baseball.

The Mariners hosted the All-Star Game on July 11. Center fielder Julio Rodríguez and pitchers Luis Castillo and George Kirby were selected as All-Stars. Rodríguez also competed in the Home Run Derby.

== Offseason ==
=== Roster changes ===
In 2022, the Mariners reached the postseason and American League Division Series for the first time since 2001. President of baseball operations Jerry Dipoto made several trades to bolster the club. The team acquired right fielder Teoscar Hernández from the Toronto Blue Jays for relievers Erik Swanson and Adam Macko. Second baseman Kolton Wong was acquired from the Milwaukee Brewers for outfielder Jesse Winker and infielder Abraham Toro. Former Rookie of the Year Award winner Kyle Lewis was traded to the Arizona Diamondbacks for Cooper Hummel. The team made a few small free agent signings, with outfielder A. J. Pollock signing for $7 million, reliever Trevor Gott signing for $1.2 million, and infielder Tommy La Stella signing for the MLB minimum $720,000. Offseason waiver claims Gabe Speier, Tayler Saucedo, and J. B. Bukauskas all pitched in relief for Seattle in 2023.

=== MLB rule changes ===
Pursuant to the collective bargaining agreement, rule changes for the 2023 season included:

- institution of a pitch clock between pitches
- limits on pickoff attempts per plate appearance
- limits on defensive shifts, requiring two infielders to be on either side of second base and be within the boundary of the infield
- larger bases (18-inch (45.7 cm) squares; previously 15-inch (38.1 cm))

== Regular season ==
=== Season standings ===
==== American League West ====
AL West
Team	W	L	Pct.	GB	Home	Road
Houston Astros	90	72	.556	—	39‍–‍42	51‍–‍30
Texas Rangers	90	72	.556	—	50‍–‍31	40‍–‍41
Seattle Mariners	88	74	.543	2	45‍–‍36	43‍–‍38
Los Angeles Angels	73	89	.451	17	38‍–‍43	35‍–‍46
Oakland Athletics	50	112	.309	40	26‍–‍55	24‍–‍57

==== American League standings ====
Division leaders
Team	W	L	Pct.
Baltimore Orioles	101	61	.623
Houston Astros	90	72	.556
Minnesota Twins	87	75	.537

Wild Card teams (Top 3 teams qualify for postseason)
Team	W	L	Pct.	GB
Tampa Bay Rays	99	63	.611	+10
Texas Rangers	90	72	.556	+1
Toronto Blue Jays	89	73	.549	—
Seattle Mariners	88	74	.543	1
New York Yankees	82	80	.506	7
Boston Red Sox	78	84	.481	11
Detroit Tigers	78	84	.481	11
Cleveland Guardians	76	86	.469	13
Los Angeles Angels	73	89	.451	16
Chicago White Sox	61	101	.377	28
Kansas City Royals	56	106	.346	33
Oakland Athletics	50	112	.309	39

==== Record vs. opponents ====
===== Record vs. American League =====
2023 American League record Source: MLB Standings Grid – 2023
Team	BAL	BOS	CWS	CLE	DET	HOU	KC	LAA	MIN	NYY	OAK	SEA	TB	TEX	TOR	NL
Baltimore	—	7–6	4–2	3–4	6–1	3–3	5–1	5–2	4–2	7–6	6–1	4–2	8–5	3–3	10–3	26–20
Boston	6–7	—	2–4	3–3	5–1	2–5	5–2	3–4	4–3	9–4	4–2	3–3	2–11	3–3	7–6	20–26
Chicago	2–4	4–2	—	8–5	5–8	3–4	6–7	3–4	4–9	4–2	3–4	2–4	1–6	1–5	0–6	15–31
Cleveland	4–3	3–3	5–8	—	4–9	2–4	7–6	3–4	7–6	2–4	5–1	4–3	3–3	3–3	4–3	20–26
Detroit	1–6	1–5	8–5	9–4	—	3–3	10–3	3–3	8–5	2–5	3–4	3–3	1–5	3–4	2–4	21–25
Houston	3–3	5–2	4–3	4–2	3–3	—	1–5	9–4	2–4	2–5	10–3	4–9	3–3	9–4	3–4	28–18
Kansas City	1–5	2–5	7–6	6–7	3–10	5–1	—	2–4	4–9	2–4	2–4	1–6	3–4	1–5	1–6	16–30
Los Angeles	2–5	4–3	4–3	4–3	3–3	4–9	4–2	—	3–3	4–2	7–6	5–8	2–4	6–7	2–4	19–27
Minnesota	2–4	3–4	9–4	6–7	5–8	4–2	9–4	3–3	—	4–3	5–1	3–4	1–5	5–2	3–3	25–21
New York	6–7	4–9	2–4	4–2	5–2	5–2	4–2	2–4	3–4	—	5–1	4–2	5–8	3–4	7–6	23–23
Oakland	1–6	2–4	4–3	1–5	4–3	3–10	4–2	6–7	1–5	1–5	—	1–12	2–5	4–9	2–4	14–32
Seattle	2–4	3–3	4–2	3–4	3–3	9–4	6–1	8–5	4–3	2–4	12–1	—	3–4	4–9	3–3	22–24
Tampa Bay	5–8	11–2	6–1	3–3	5–1	3–3	4–3	4–2	5–1	8–5	5–2	4–3	—	2–4	7–6	27–19
Texas	3–3	3–3	5–1	3–3	4–3	4–9	5–1	7–6	2–5	4–3	9–4	9–4	4–2	—	6–1	22–24
Toronto	3–10	6–7	6–0	3–4	4–2	4–3	6–1	4–2	3–3	6–7	4–2	3–3	6–7	1–6	—	30–16

Updated with the results of all games through October 1, 2023.

===== Record vs. National League =====
2023 American League record vs. National League Source: MLB Standings
Team	ARI	ATL	CHC	CIN	COL	LAD	MIA	MIL	NYM	PHI	PIT	SD	SF	STL	WSH
Baltimore	2–1	1–2	1–2	1–2	2–1	1–2	3–0	1–2	3–0	1–2	2–1	1–2	2–1	1–2	4–0
Boston	2–1	3–1	2–1	1–2	1–2	1–2	0–3	2–1	2–1	2–1	0–3	2–1	1–2	0–3	1–2
Chicago	1–2	2–1	1–3	2–1	1–2	1–2	1–2	0–3	1–2	1–2	1–2	0–3	1–2	1–2	1–2
Cleveland	1–2	1–2	2–1	2–2	1–2	1–2	1–2	1–2	0–3	2–1	2–1	1–2	1–2	2–1	2–1
Detroit	0–3	1–2	1–2	1–2	2–1	1–2	1–2	2–1	3–0	0–3	2–2	1–2	3–0	2–1	1–2
Houston	3–0	3–0	3–0	0–3	3–1	1–2	2–1	1–2	2–1	1–2	2–1	2–1	1–2	2–1	2–1
Kansas City	1–2	0–3	1–2	0–3	1–2	2–1	0–3	0–3	3–0	1–2	0–3	2–1	2–1	2–2	1–2
Los Angeles	1–2	1–2	3–0	0–3	1–2	0–4	0–3	1–2	2–1	1–2	2–1	0–3	2–1	3–0	2–1
Minnesota	3–0	0–3	2–1	2–1	2–1	1–2	1–2	2–2	2–1	2–1	2–1	2–1	1–2	2–1	1–2
New York	2–1	0–3	1–2	3–0	1–2	2–1	1–2	1–2	2–2	2–1	2–1	2–1	2–1	1–2	1–2
Oakland	1–2	2–1	0–3	1–2	2–1	0–3	0–3	3–0	0–3	0–3	2–1	0–3	2–2	1–2	0–3
Seattle	2–1	1–2	1–2	1–2	3–0	0–3	2–1	0–3	1–2	1–2	2–1	3–1	2–1	2–1	1–2
Tampa Bay	2–1	1–2	1–2	2–1	3–0	2–1	3–1	2–1	1–2	0–3	3–0	1–2	2–1	1–2	3–0
Texas	1–3	1–2	1–2	0–3	3–0	1–2	3–0	0–3	2–1	3–0	2–1	0–3	2–1	2–1	1–2
Toronto	3–0	3–0	1–2	2–1	2–1	2–1	2–1	2–1	3–0	1–3	3–0	1–2	2–1	1–2	2–1

Updated with the results of all games through October 1, 2023.

=== Season summary ===
The Mariners played .500 baseball during their first 100 games of the season. The team spent most of June and July eight to ten games behind the AL West-leading Texas Rangers. Seattle traded closer Paul Sewald at the July trade deadline to the Arizona Diamondbacks for Dominic Canzone, Josh Rojas, and Ryan Bliss. Sewald would close games in the playoffs, but his replacement closer, Andrés Muñoz, was named the AL Reliever of the Month for August after getting eight saves. Center fielder Julio Rodríguez, the AL Player of the Month for August, led the team to a franchise-record 21 wins in August. The team held its first division lead of the season on August 27, but never led by more than one game, last sharing the division lead on September 4. Seattle faced division rivals Texas and the Houston Astros for the final 10 games of the season but lost four of the first five of those games and was eliminated from the playoffs. After being eliminated, catcher Cal Raleigh criticized the team's management for trading Sewald and not bringing in more players. President of baseball operations Jerry Dipoto told reporters after the season that his goal was for the Mariners to win 54 percent of their games. He later apologized for his remarks and said he is trying to win a championship.

The Mariners had strong starting pitching, despite losing starters Robbie Ray and Marco Gonzales to season-ending injuries in the first half of the season. Luis Castillo and George Kirby were named to the All-Star Game. Those two, along with Logan Gilbert, won at least 13 games with an earned run average under 4.00 in at least 190 innings pitched. Gilbert threw a five-hit shutout against the San Francisco Giants on July 4 and was named the AL Player of the Week. Prospects Bryce Miller, Bryan Woo, and Emerson Hancock made their MLB debuts to bolster the starting rotation. Matt Brash led the majors with 78 games pitched.

Rodríguez topped the team in most offensive categories and won a Silver Slugger Award. Shortstop J. P. Crawford led the AL with 94 walks, and third baseman Eugenio Suárez led the league with 214 strikeouts, with right fielder Teoscar Hernandez finishing second with 211 and Rodríguez a distant third. Suárez was the only Mariner to play in all 162 games.

==== Transactions ====
- May 4: Infielder Tommy La Stella released.
- July 3: Pitchers Chris Flexen and Trevor Gott traded to the New York Mets for pitcher Zach Muckenhirn.
- July 26: **I**nfielder Mason McCoy traded to the Toronto Blue Jays for pitcher Trent Thornton.
- July 31: Closer Paul Sewald traded to the Arizona Diamondbacks for outfielder Dominic Canzone and infielders Josh Rojas and Ryan Bliss. Outfielder A. J. Pollock, utility player Mark Mathias, and cash traded to the San Francisco Giants for a player to be named later.
- August 3: Kolten Wong released.
- August 8: Matt Festa released.
- August 22: Luke Weaver signed as a free agent.
- August 30: Luis Torrens signed as a free agent.
- August 31: Dominic Leone claimed off waivers from the Los Angeles Angels.
- September 2: The Oakland Athletics claimed Devin Sweet off waivers.
- September 12: The New York Yankees claimed Weaver off waivers.

==== MLB debuts ====
- José Caballero, April 15
- Bryce Miller, May 2
- Juan Then, May 6
- Bryan Woo, June 3
- Ty Adcock, June 12
- Isaiah Campbell, July 7
- Devin Sweet, July 19
- Cade Marlowe, July 20
- Prelander Berroa, July 21
- Emerson Hancock, August 9
- Ryder Ryan, August 11

=== Game log ===
Legend
	Mariners win
	Mariners loss
	Postponement
	Eliminated from playoff race
**Bold**	Mariners team member

2023 game log: 88–74 (Home: 45–36; Away: 43–38)
March/April: 12–16 (Home: 7–9; Away: 5–7)

#	Date	Opponent	Score	Win	Loss	Save	Attendance	Record	Streak
1	March 30	Guardians	3–0	**Sewald** (1–0)	Karinchak (0–1)	**Muñoz** (1)	45,268	1–0	W1
2	March 31	Guardians	4–9	Sandlin (1–0)	**Ray** (0–1)	—	31,516	1–1	L1
3	April 1	Guardians	0–2	Civale (1–0)	**Gilbert** (0–1)	Clase (1)	44,250	1–2	L2
4	April 2	Guardians	5–6 (10)	De Los Santos (1–0)	**Murfee** (0–1)	Stephan (1)	34,045	1–3	L3
5	April 3	Angels	3–7	Tepera (1–0)	**Kirby** (0–1)	—	18,877	1–4	L4
6	April 4	Angels	11–2	**L. Castillo** (1–0)	Suárez (0–1)	—	19,255	2–4	W1
7	April 5	Angels	3–4	Ohtani (1–0)	**Flexen** (0–1)	Quijada (1)	25,648	2–5	L1
8	April 7	@ Guardians	5–3	**Murfee** (1–1)	Civale (1–1)	**Sewald** (1)	34,821	3–5	W1
9	April 8	@ Guardians	3–2	**Gonzales** (1–0)	Quantrill (0–1)	**Sewald** (2)	17,489	4–5	W2
10	April 9	@ Guardians	6–7 (12)	Herrin (1–0)	**Murfee** (1–2)	—	12,716	4–6	L1
11	April 10	@ Cubs	2–3 (10)	Thompson (1–0)	**Brash** (0–1)	—	26,766	4–7	L2
12	April 11	@ Cubs	9–14	Rucker (1–0)	**Flexen** (0–2)	—	30,081	4–8	L3
13	April 12	@ Cubs	5–2	**Gilbert** (1–1)	Stroman (2–1)	—	26,944	5–8	W1
14	April 14	Rockies	5–3	**Brash** (1–1)	Gomber (0–3)	**Sewald** (3)	32,698	6–8	W2
15	April 15	Rockies	9–2	**Kirby** (1–1)	Feltner (0–2)	—	27,549	7–8	W3
16	April 16	Rockies	1–0	**L. Castillo** (2–0)	Lamet (1–1)	**Sewald** (4)	23,585	8–8	W4
17	April 17	Brewers	3–7	Burnes (2–1)	**Flexen** (0–3)	—	14,276	8–9	L1
18	April 18	Brewers	5–6 (11)	Wilson (1–0)	**Topa** (0–1)	—	18,206	8–10	L2
19	April 19	Brewers	3–5	Lauer (3–1)	**Brash** (1–2)	Bush (1)	17,461	8–11	L3
20	April 21	Cardinals	5–2	**Kirby** (2–1)	Matz (0–3)	**Sewald** (5)	29,633	9–11	W1
21	April 22	Cardinals	5–4	**Brash** (2–2)	Thompson (1–1)	**Sewald** (6)	38,732	10–11	W2
22	April 23	Cardinals	3–7	Flaherty (2–2)	**Flexen** (0–4)	—	36,249	10–12	L1
23	April 25	@ Phillies	5–3	**Gonzales** (2–0)	Falter (0–4)	**Sewald** (7)	42,323	11–12	W1
24	April 26	@ Phillies	5–6	Kimbrel (1–0)	**Topa** (0–2)	Alvarado (4)	32,641	11–13	L1
25	April 27	@ Phillies	0–1	Strahm (2–2)	**Kirby** (2–2)	Kimbrel (3)	31,543	11–14	L2
26	April 28	@ Blue Jays	2–3	Mayza (1–0)	**Gott** (0–1)	Romano (9)	41,414	11–15	L3
27	April 29	@ Blue Jays	0–1 (10)	Swanson (1–0)	**Gott** (0–2)	—	41,475	11–16	L4
28	April 30	@ Blue Jays	10–8 (10)	**Sewald** (2–0)	Pop (1–1)	**Brash** (1)	40,158	12–16	W1

May: 17–11 (Home: 10–6; Away: 7–5)

#	Date	Opponent	Score	Win	Loss	Save	Attendance	Record	Streak
29	May 2	@ Athletics	2–1	**Speier** (1–0)	Lovelady (0–1)	**Sewald** (8)	2,583	13–16	W2
30	May 3	@ Athletics	7–2 (10)	**Brash** (3–2)	Oller (1–1)	—	2,685	14–16	W3
31	May 4	@ Athletics	5–3	**Kirby** (3–2)	Rucinski (0–2)	**Sewald** (9)	13,025	15–16	W4
32	May 5	Astros	4–6	Abreu (1–0)	**Brash** (3–3)	Pressly (4)	32,944	15–17	L1
33	May 6	Astros	7–5	**Saucedo** (1–0)	Montero (0–1)	—	40,328	16–17	W1
34	May 7	Astros	3–1	**Miller** (1–0)	Bielak (0–1)	**Topa** (1)	42,277	17–17	W2
35	May 8	Rangers	1–2	Gray (2–1)	**Gilbert** (1–2)	Smith (5)	15,282	17–18	L1
36	May 9	Rangers	5–0	**Kirby** (4–2)	Heaney (2–3)	—	17,638	18–18	W1
37	May 10	Rangers	3–4	Dunning (3–0)	**L. Castillo** (2–1)	Smith (6)	22,480	18–19	L1
38	May 12	@ Tigers	9–2	**Gonzales** (3–0)	Boyd (2–3)	—	22,116	19–19	W1
39	May 13	@ Tigers	5–0	**Miller** (2–0)	Faedo (0–1)	—	23,511	20–19	W2
40	May 14	@ Tigers	3–5	Foley (1–1)	**Speier** (1–1)	Lange (7)	20,160	20–20	L1
41	May 15	@ Red Sox	10–1	**Kirby** (5–2)	Houck (3–3)	—	31,744	21–20	W1
42	May 16	@ Red Sox	4–9	Pivetta (3–3)	**L. Castillo** (2–2)	—	31,476	21–21	L1
43	May 17	@ Red Sox	3–12	Bello (3–1)	**Gonzales** (3–1)	—	32,209	21–22	L2
44	May 19	@ Braves	2–6	McHugh (2–0)	**Miller** (2–1)	—	40,412	21–23	L3
45	May 20	@ Braves	7–3	**Gilbert** (2–2)	Tonkin (3–2)	—	40,250	22–23	W1
46	May 21	@ Braves	2–3	Shuster (1–2)	**Kirby** (5–3)	Iglesias (3)	40,213	22–24	L1
47	May 22	Athletics	11–2	**L. Castillo** (3–2)	Muller (1–4)	—	15,418	23–24	W1
48	May 23	Athletics	3–2	**Gonzales** (4–1)	Medina (0–3)	**Sewald** (10)	15,646	24–24	W2
49	May 24	Athletics	6–1	**Miller** (3–1)	Waldichuk (1–4)	—	14,899	25–24	W3
50	May 25	Athletics	3–2	**Gilbert** (3–2)	Lovelady (0–3)	**Sewald** (11)	19,268	26–24	W4
51	May 26	Pirates	6–11	Keller (6–1)	**Kirby** (5–4)	—	32,209	26–25	L1
52	May 27	Pirates	5–0	**L. Castillo** (4–2)	Velasquez (4–4)	—	44,624	27–25	W1
53	May 28	Pirates	6–3 (10)	**Saucedo** (2–0)	Stephenson (0–3)	—	38,219	28–25	W2
54	May 29	Yankees	4–10	Germán (3–3)	**Miller** (3–2)	—	34,154	28–26	L1
55	May 30	Yankees	2–10	Cortés Jr. (5–2)	**Gilbert** (3–3)	—	26,846	28–27	L2
56	May 31	Yankees	1–0 (10)	**Topa** (1–2)	Marinaccio (2–2)	—	24,596	29–27	W1

June: 9–15 (Home: 5–5; Away: 4–10)

#	Date	Opponent	Score	Win	Loss	Save	Attendance	Record	Streak
57	June 2	@ Rangers	0–2	Gray (6–1)	**L. Castillo** (4–3)	Smith (10)	31,685	29–28	L1
58	June 3	@ Rangers	6–16	Sborz (2–2)	**Woo** (0–1)	—	34,435	29–29	L2
59	June 4	@ Rangers	3–12	Eovaldi (8–2)	**Miller** (3–3)	—	36,496	29–30	L3
60	June 6	@ Padres	4–1	**Gilbert** (4–3)	Honeywell Jr. (2–3)	**Sewald** (12)	40,395	30–30	W1
61	June 7	@ Padres	3–10	Wacha (6–2)	**Kirby** (5–5)	—	35,490	30–31	L1
62	June 9	@ Angels	4–5	Webb (1–0)	**L. Castillo** (4–4)	Estévez (17)	36,064	30–32	L2
63	June 10	@ Angels	6–2	**Speier** (2–1)	Sandoval (3–6)	—	38,454	31–32	W1
64	June 11	@ Angels	4–9	Canning (5–2)	**Gilbert** (4–4)	—	39,405	31–33	L1
65	June 12	Marlins	8–1	**Miller** (4–3)	Luzardo (5–5)	—	23,463	32–33	W1
66	June 13	Marlins	9–3	**Kirby** (6–5)	Cabrera (5–5)	—	19,510	33–33	W2
67	June 14	Marlins	1–4	Pérez (4–1)	**L. Castillo** (4–5)	—	20,498	33–34	L1
68	June 16	White Sox	3–2	**Brash** (4–3)	Banks (0–1)	**Sewald** (13)	36,061	34–34	W1
69	June 17	White Sox	3–4 (11)	Bummer (2–1)	**Saucedo** (2–1)	Scholtens (1)	45,188	34–35	L1
70	June 18	White Sox	5–1	**Miller** (5–3)	Lynn (4–8)	—	44,772	35–35	W1
71	June 20	@ Yankees	1–3	Cole (8–1)	**Kirby** (6–6)	Holmes (9)	43,130	35–36	L1
72	June 21	@ Yankees	2–4	Brito (4–3)	**L. Castillo** (4–6)	Kahnle (1)	41,090	35–37	L2
73	June 22	@ Yankees	10–2	**Woo** (1–1)	Germán (4–5)	—	42,440	36–37	W1
74	June 23	@ Orioles	13–1	**Gilbert** (5–4)	Gibson (8–5)	—	16,234	37–37	W2
75	June 24	@ Orioles	4–6 (10)	Baumann (5–0)	**Topa** (1–3)	—	32,884	37–38	L1
76	June 25	@ Orioles	2–3	Bradish (4–3)	**Kirby** (6–7)	Bautista (21)	19,143	37–39	L2
77	June 26	Nationals	8–4	**L. Castillo** (5–6)	Abbott (0–1)	**Sewald** (14)	23,329	38–39	W1
78	June 27	Nationals	4–7 (11)	Weems (1–0)	**Gott** (0–3)	—	22,671	38–40	L1
79	June 28	Nationals	1–4	Corbin (5–9)	**Gilbert** (5–5)	Harvey (6)	26,437	38–41	L2
80	June 30	Rays	4–15	Kelly (4–1)	**Muñoz** (0–1)	—	37,063	38–42	L3

July: 17–9 (Home: 8–5; Away: 9–4)

#	Date	Opponent	Score	Win	Loss	Save	Attendance	Record	Streak
81	July 1	Rays	8–3	**Kirby** (7–7)	Glasnow (2–2)	**Sewald** (15)	35,546	39–42	W1
82	July 2	Rays	7–6	**Muñoz** (1–1)	Adam (2–2)	**Sewald** (16)	36,541	40–42	W2
83	July 3	@ Giants	6–5	**Muñoz** (2–1)	Doval (2–3)	—	40,691	41–42	W3
84	July 4	@ Giants	6–0	**Gilbert** (6–5)	Winn (0–2)	—	37,395	42–42	W4
85	July 5	@ Giants	0–2	Cobb (6–2)	**Milone** (0–1)	Doval (25)	24,108	42–43	L1
86	July 6	@ Astros	5–1	**Kirby** (8–7)	Blanco (2–1)	—	40,562	43–43	W1
87	July 7	@ Astros	10–1	**L. Castillo** (6–6)	Brown (6–6)	—	34,737	44–43	W2
88	July 8	@ Astros	2–3	Neris (5–2)	**Muñoz** (2–2)	Pressly (20)	37,112	44–44	L1
89	July 9	@ Astros	3–1	**Gilbert** (7–5)	Bielak (4–5)	**Sewald** (17)	39,421	45–44	W1
–	July 11	**93rd All-Star Game in Seattle, WA**							
90	July 14	Tigers	4–5	Rodríguez (5–5)	**L. Castillo** (6–7)	Lange (14)	39,014	45–45	L1
91	July 15	Tigers	0–6	Lorenzen (4–6)	**Kirby** (8–8)	—	38,683	45–46	L2
92	July 16	Tigers	2–0	**Miller** (6–3)	Olson (1–3)	**Sewald** (18)	32,368	46–46	W1
93	July 17	Twins	7–6	**Gilbert** (8–5)	Gray (4–4)	**Sewald** (19)	25,770	47–46	W2
94	July 18	Twins	3–10	Ober (6–4)	**Woo** (1–2)	—	28,141	47–47	L1
95	July 19	Twins	3–6	Jax (6–6)	**Muñoz** (2–3)	Durán (16)	25,825	47–48	L2
96	July 20	Twins	5–0	**Kirby** (9–8)	López (5–6)	—	29,443	48–48	W1
97	July 21	Blue Jays	3–2	**Sewald** (3–0)	Romano (4–5)	—	42,352	49–48	W2
98	July 22	Blue Jays	9–8	**Campbell** (1–0)	Pearson (5–2)	**Topa** (2)	44,921	50–48	W3
99	July 23	Blue Jays	3–4	Mayza (2–1)	**Woo** (1–3)	Romano (27)	42,430	50–49	L1
100	July 24	@ Twins	3–4 (10)	López (4–2)	**Sewald** (3–1)	—	22,969	50–50	L2
101	July 25	@ Twins	9–7	**Brash** (5–3)	Ortega (0–1)	**Sewald** (20)	26,824	51–50	W1
102	July 26	@ Twins	8–7	**Miller** (7–3)	Ryan (9–7)	**Muñoz** (2)	25,728	52–50	W2
103	July 28	@ Diamondbacks	5–2	**Gilbert** (9–5)	Henry (5–4)	**Sewald** (21)	31,697	53–50	W3
104	July 29	@ Diamondbacks	3–4	Ginkel (4–0)	**Muñoz** (2–4)	McGough (8)	44,472	53–51	L1
105	July 30	@ Diamondbacks	4–0	**L. Castillo** (7–7)	Kelly (9–5)	—	35,295	54–51	W1
106	July 31	Red Sox	6–2	**Brash** (6–3)	Pivetta (7–6)	—	32,665	55–51	W2

August: 21–6 (Home: 9–4; Away: 12–2)

#	Date	Opponent	Score	Win	Loss	Save	Attendance	Record	Streak
107	August 1	Red Sox	4–6	Bello (8–6)	**Miller** (7–4)	Jansen (24)	28,677	55–52	L1
108	August 2	Red Sox	6–3	**Brash** (7–3)	Schreiber (1–1)	**Muñoz** (3)	37,942	56–52	W1
109	August 3	@ Angels	5–3	**Campbell** (2–0)	Estévez (5–2)	**Muñoz** (4)	37,701	57–52	W2
110	August 4	@ Angels	9–7	**Topa** (2–3)	López (2–6)	**Brash** (2)	34,479	58–52	W3
111	August 5	@ Angels	3–2	**Kirby** (10–8)	Anderson (5–3)	**Muñoz** (5)	35,318	59–52	W4
112	August 6	@ Angels	3–2 (10)	**Saucedo** (3–1)	Barría (2–6)	—	29,960	60–52	W5
113	August 8	Padres	2–0	**Gilbert** (10–5)	Barlow (2–5)	**Muñoz** (6)	40,231	61–52	W6
114	August 9	Padres	6–1	**Brash** (8–3)	Wilson (1–1)	—	39,546	62–52	W7
115	August 11	Orioles	9–2	**L. Castillo** (8–7)	Gibson (11–7)	—	36,203	63–52	W8
116	August 12	Orioles	0–1 (10)	Bautista (7–2)	**Muñoz** (2–5)	—	45,823	63–53	L1
117	August 13	Orioles	3–5 (10)	Vespi (1–0)	**Thornton** (0–1)	Fujinami (1)	44,818	63–54	L2
118	August 14	@ Royals	6–7	Wittgren (1–0)	**Brash** (8–4)	—	11,878	63–55	L3
119	August 15	@ Royals	10–8 (10)	**Muñoz** (3–5)	Davidson (1–2)	**Saucedo** (1)	12,759	64–55	W1
120	August 16	@ Royals	6–5	**L. Castillo** (9–7)	Coleman (0–1)	**Brash** (3)	11,091	65–55	W2
121	August 17	@ Royals	6–4	**Campbell** (3–0)	Hernández (1–8)	**Brash** (4)	10,875	66–55	W3
122	August 18	@ Astros	2–0	**Miller** (8–4)	France (9–4)	**Muñoz** (7)	38,060	67–55	W4
123	August 19	@ Astros	10–3	**Gilbert** (11–5)	Valdez (9–9)	—	38,280	68–55	W5
124	August 20	@ Astros	7–6	**Brash** (9–4)	Brown (9–9)	**Speier** (1)	36,642	69–55	W6
125	August 21	@ White Sox	14–2	**L. Castillo** (10–7)	Toussaint (1–6)	—	15,275	70–55	W7
126	August 22	@ White Sox	6–3	**Topa** (3–3)	Clevinger (5–6)	**Muñoz** (8)	16,070	71–55	W8
127	August 23	@ White Sox	4–5 (10)	Peralta (2–0)	**Topa** (3–4)	—	15,759	71–56	L1
128	August 25	Royals	7–5	**Campbell** (4–0)	Singer (8–10)	**Muñoz** (9)	45,175	72–56	W1
129	August 26	Royals	15–2	**Gilbert** (12–5)	Lyles (3–15)	—	41,744	73–56	W2
130	August 27	Royals	3–2	**L. Castillo** (11–7)	Marsh (0–7)	**Muñoz** (10)	38,829	74–56	W3
131	August 28	Athletics	7–0	**Woo** (2–3)	Muller (1–5)	—	37,434	75–56	W4
132	August 29	Athletics	1–3	Newcomb (1–0)	**Weaver** (2–5)	May (15)	44,280	75–57	L1
133	August 30	Athletics	5–4	**Topa** (4–4)	Snead (1–2)	**Muñoz** (11)	29,247	76–57	W1

September/October: 12–17 (Home: 6–7; Away: 6–10)

#	Date	Opponent	Score	Win	Loss	Save	Attendance	Record	Streak
134	September 1	@ Mets	1–2	Bickford (4–4)	**Muñoz** (3–6)	Smith (3)	33,340	76–58	L1
135	September 2	@ Mets	8–7	**Topa** (5–4)	Ottavino (1–5)	—	31,480	77–58	W1
136	September 3	@ Mets	3–6	Megill (8–7)	**Kirby** (10–9)	Ottavino (8)	27,764	77–59	L1
137	September 4	@ Reds	3–6	Sims (5–3)	**Woo** (2–4)	Gibaut (2)	20,994	77–60	L2
138	September 5	@ Reds	6–7	Díaz (8–4)	**Muñoz** (3–7)	—	17,863	77–61	L3
139	September 6	@ Reds	8–4	**Gilbert** (13–5)	Richardson (0–2)	—	13,423	78–61	W1
140	September 7	@ Rays	1–0	**L. Castillo** (12–7)	Littell (3–5)	**Muñoz** (12)	10,060	79–61	W2
141	September 8	@ Rays	4–7	Devenski (4–4)	**Campbell** (4–1)	Fairbanks (21)	21,243	79–62	L1
142	September 9	@ Rays	5–7	Poche (11–3)	**Saucedo** (3–2)	—	18,008	79–63	L2
143	September 10	@ Rays	3–6	Eflin (14–8)	**Miller** (8–5)	Fairbanks (22)	18,230	79–64	L3
144	September 11	Angels	5–8 (11)	Herget (2–3)	**Thornton** (0–2)	—	37,807	79–65	L4
145	September 12	Angels	8–0	**Woo** (3–4)	Sandoval (7–13)	—	33,771	80–65	W1
146	September 13	Angels	3–2	**L. Castillo** (13–7)	Suárez (1–3)	**Muñoz** (13)	31,250	81–65	W2
147	September 15	Dodgers	3–6	Miller (10–3)	**Kirby** (10–10)	Phillips (23)	43,823	81–66	L1
148	September 16	Dodgers	2–6 (10)	Phillips (2–4)	**Speier** (2–2)	—	45,818	81–67	L2
149	September 17	Dodgers	1–6	Yarbrough (8–6)	**Gilbert** (13–6)	Stone (1)	45,477	81–68	L3
150	September 18	@ Athletics	5–0	**Woo** (4–4)	Sears (5–12)	—	4,972	82–68	W1
151	September 19	@ Athletics	7–2	**L. Castillo** (14–7)	Blackburn (4–6)	—	6,294	83–68	W2
152	September 20	@ Athletics	6–3	**Kirby** (11–10)	Estes (0–1)	**Topa** (3)	5,602	84–68	W3
153	September 22	@ Rangers	5–8	Dunning (11–6)	**Miller** (8–6)	—	35,431	84–69	L1
154	September 23	@ Rangers	0–2	Montgomery (10–11)	**Gilbert** (13–7)	Chapman (6)	36,900	84–70	L2
155	September 24	@ Rangers	8–9	Eovaldi (12–4)	**Woo** (4–5)	Leclerc (4)	35,412	84–71	L3
156	September 25	Astros	1–5	Verlander (12–9)	**L. Castillo** (14–8)	—	39,920	84–72	L4
157	September 26	Astros	6–2	**Kirby** (12–10)	Javier (9–5)	—	40,035	85–72	W1
158	September 27	Astros	3–8	Graveman (5–6)	**Miller** (8–7)	—	38,019	85–73	L1
159	September 28	Rangers	3–2	**Muñoz** (4–7)	Chapman (6–5)	—	43,817	86–73	W1
160	September 29	Rangers	8–0	**Thornton** (2–3)	Eovaldi (12–5)	—	45,274	87–73	W2
161	September 30	Rangers	1–6	Sborz (6–7)	**L. Castillo** (14–9)	—	44,694	87–74	L1
162	October 1	Rangers	1–0	**Kirby** (13–10)	Dunning (12–7)	**Campbell** (1)	43,997	88–74	W1

== 2023 roster ==
2023 Seattle Mariners
Roster
Pitchers: 70 Ty Adcock; 41 Eduard Bazardo; 52 Prelander Berroa; 47 Matt Brash; 50 J. B. Bukauskas; 49 Isaiah Campbell; 63 Diego Castillo; 58 Luis Castillo; 67 Matt Festa; 77 Chris Flexen; 36 Logan Gilbert; 7 Marco Gonzales; 30 Trevor Gott; 62 Emerson Hancock; 68 George Kirby; 54 Dominic Leone; 26 Darren McCaughan; 59 Easton McGee; 50 Bryce Miller; 53 Tommy Milone; 75 Andrés Muñoz; 56 Penn Murfee; 38 Robbie Ray; 54 José Rodriguez; 77 Ryder Ryan; 60 Tayler Saucedo; 37 Paul Sewald; 55 Gabe Speier; 31 Devin Sweet; 43 Juan Then; 46 Trent Thornton; 48 Justin Topa; 30 Luke Weaver; 33 Bryan Woo	Catchers: 2 Tom Murphy; 64 Brian O'Keefe; 29 Cal Raleigh; 22 Luis Torrens; Infielders: 76 José Caballero; 3 J. P. Crawford; 20 Mike Ford; 23 Ty France; 25 Dylan Moore; 4 Josh Rojas; 28 Eugenio Suárez; 16 Kolten Wong	Outfielders: 8 Dominic Canzone; 0 Sam Haggerty; 35 Teoscar Hernández; 21 Cooper Hummel; 10 Jarred Kelenic; 18 Cade Marlowe; 8 A. J. Pollock; 44 Julio Rodríguez; 5 Taylor Trammell; Other batters: 4 Tommy La Stella	Manager: 9 Scott Servais; Coaches: 14 Manny Acta (third base); 57 Tony Arnerich (hitting); 66 Fleming Baez (bullpen catcher); 79 Trent Blank (director of pitching strategy); 89 Nasusel Cabrera (batting practice pitcher); 88 Jarret DeHart (assistant hitting); 6 Perry Hill (infield); 45 Kristopher Negrón (first base); 95 Justin Novak (bullpen catcher); 39 Carson Vitale (field coordinator); 13 Stephen Vogt (bullpen/quality control); 32 Pete Woodworth (pitching)

=== Player stats ===
= Indicates team leader

= Indicates league leader

==== Batting ====
Note: G = Games played; AB = At bats; R = Runs; H = Hits; 2B = Doubles; 3B = Triples; HR = Home runs; RBI = Runs batted in; SB = Stolen bases; BB = Walks; AVG = Batting average; SLG = Slugging average

Player	G	AB	R	H	2B	3B	HR	RBI	SB	BB	AVG	SLG
Julio Rodríguez	155	654	102	180	37	2	32	103	37	47	.275	.485
Teoscar Hernández	160	625	70	161	29	2	26	93	7	38	.258	.435
Eugenio Suárez	162	598	68	139	29	0	22	96	2	70	.232	.391
Ty France	158	587	79	147	32	0	12	58	1	43	.250	.366
J. P. Crawford	145	534	94	142	35	0	19	65	2	94	.266	.438
Cal Raleigh	145	513	78	119	23	1	30	75	0	54	.232	.456
Jarred Kelenic	105	372	44	94	25	2	11	49	13	41	.253	.419
José Caballero	104	231	37	51	9	1	4	26	26	28	.221	.320
Mike Ford	83	219	32	50	6	0	16	34	0	24	.228	.475
Kolten Wong	67	194	21	32	6	0	2	19	1	16	.165	.227
Dylan Moore	67	145	18	30	9	1	7	19	7	16	.207	.428
Tom Murphy	47	145	19	42	12	0	8	17	0	10	.290	.538
Dominic Canzone	44	135	19	29	11	0	5	13	1	6	.215	.407
A. J. Pollock	49	127	15	22	4	0	5	15	0	9	.173	.323
Josh Rojas	46	125	24	34	4	0	4	14	6	9	.272	.400
Sam Haggerty	52	91	13	23	3	1	1	5	10	15	.253	.341
Cade Marlowe	34	88	14	21	3	2	3	11	4	12	.239	.420
Taylor Trammell	22	46	7	6	0	0	3	11	0	9	.130	.326
Cooper Hummel	10	23	2	2	1	0	0	0	1	2	.087	.130
Tommy La Stella	12	21	2	4	1	0	0	2	0	3	.190	.238
Brian O'Keefe	8	19	0	2	2	0	0	2	0	2	.105	.211
Luis Torrens	5	8	0	2	2	0	0	1	0	0	.250	.500
Totals	162	5500	758	1332	283	12	210	728	118	548	.242	.413
Rank in AL	—	8	7	10	6	15	7	7	5	6	11	9

==== Pitching ====
Note: W = Wins; L = Losses; ERA = Earned run average; G = Games pitched; GS = Games started; SV = Saves; IP = Innings pitched; H = Hits allowed; R = Runs allowed; ER = Earned runs allowed; BB = Walks allowed; SO = Strikeouts

Player	W	L	ERA	G	GS	SV	IP	H	R	ER	BB	SO
Luis Castillo	14	9	3.34	33	33	0	197	160	81	73	56	219
George Kirby	13	10	3.35	31	31	0	190 2/3	179	74	71	19	172
Logan Gilbert	13	7	3.73	32	32	0	190 2/3	169	82	79	36	189
Bryce Miller	8	7	4.32	25	25	0	131 1/3	124	64	63	26	119
Bryan Woo	4	5	4.21	18	18	0	87 2/3	75	44	41	31	93
Matt Brash	9	4	3.06	78	0	4	70 2/3	65	26	24	29	107
Justin Topa	5	4	2.61	75	0	3	69	61	26	20	18	61
Gabe Speier	2	2	3.79	69	0	1	54 2/3	47	24	23	11	64
Marco Gonzales	4	1	5.22	10	10	0	50	55	32	29	18	34
Andrés Muñoz	4	7	2.94	52	0	13	49	40	20	16	22	67
Tayler Saucedo	3	2	3.59	52	0	1	47 2/3	41	20	19	23	43
Paul Sewald	3	1	2.93	45	0	21	43	30	15	14	14	60
Chris Flexen	0	4	7.71	17	4	0	42	59	36	36	19	29
Trevor Gott	0	3	4.03	30	0	0	29	33	19	13	8	32
Isaiah Campbell	4	1	2.83	27	0	1	28 2/3	22	9	9	13	33
Trent Thornton	1	2	2.08	23	1	0	26	23	11	6	5	21
Ty Adcock	0	0	3.45	12	0	0	15 2/3	11	7	6	0	11
Penn Murfee	1	2	1.29	16	0	0	14	5	5	2	10	16
Eduard Bazardo	0	0	2.63	9	0	0	13 2/3	9	4	4	4	14
Luke Weaver	0	1	6.08	5	1	0	13 1/3	16	9	9	3	8
Emerson Hancock	0	0	4.50	3	3	0	12	13	6	6	3	6
Juan Then	0	0	4.91	9	0	0	11	14	6	6	2	5
Dominic Leone	0	0	4.35	9	0	0	10 1/3	7	5	5	8	10
Matt Festa	0	0	4.00	8	0	0	9	4	4	4	12	13
Tommy Milone	0	1	2.00	2	2	0	9	7	3	2	6	3
Diego Castillo	0	0	6.23	8	0	0	8 2/3	7	6	6	7	7
Easton McGee	0	0	0.00	1	1	0	6 2/3	1	0	0	1	2
Darren McCaughan	0	0	5.40	3	0	0	5	7	5	3	3	10
Robbie Ray	0	1	8.10	1	1	0	3 1/3	4	5	3	5	3
José Rodríguez	0	0	9.00	1	0	0	3	3	3	3	1	1
Devin Sweet	0	0	9.00	2	0	0	2	2	2	2	1	1
Mike Ford	0	0	18.00	2	0	0	2	5	4	4	1	0
Prelander Berroa	0	0	0.00	2	0	0	1 2/3	0	0	0	3	3
Ryder Ryan	0	0	0.00	1	0	0	1	0	0	0	1	2
J.B. Bukauskas	0	0	9.00	1	0	0	1	2	2	1	2	1
Totals	88	74	3.74	162	162	44	1449	1300	659	602	421	1459
Rank in AL	6	10	1	—	—	5	4	4	1	1	1	6

== Farm system ==
Level	Team	League	Manager
AAA	Tacoma Rainiers	Pacific Coast League	John Russell
AA	Arkansas Travelers	Texas League	Mike Freeman
High-A	Everett AquaSox	Northwest League	Ryan Scott
A	Modesto Nuts	California League	Zach Vincej
Rookie	ACL Mariners	Arizona Complex League	Luis Caballero
Foreign Rookie	DSL Mariners	Dominican Summer League	Jose Amancio
