= Ty Adcock =

American baseball player (born 1997)

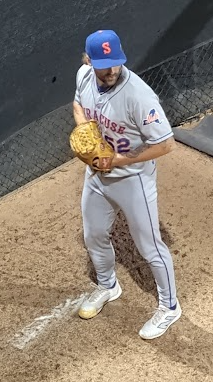
- Adcock with the Syracuse Mets in 2025

Free agent
- Pitcher
- Born: February 7, 1997 (age 29); Oxford, North Carolina, U.S.
- Bats: Right Throws: Right

MLB debut
- June 12, 2023, for the Seattle Mariners

MLB statistics (through 2025 season)
- Win–loss record: 0–0
- Earned run average: 5.48
- Strikeouts: 19
- Stats at Baseball Reference

Teams
- Seattle Mariners (2023); New York Mets (2024–2025)

Tyler Nathan McKenzie Adcock (born February 7, 1997) is an American professional baseball pitcher who is a free agent. He has previously played in Major League Baseball (MLB) for the Seattle Mariners and New York Mets.

== Career ==
=== Amateur career ===
Adcock graduated from South Granville High School in Creedmoor, North Carolina. He then attended Elon University and played college baseball for the Elon Phoenix.

=== Seattle Mariners ===
The Seattle Mariners selected Adcock in the eighth round, with the 246th overall selection, of the 2019 Major League Baseball draft. He did not play for the Mariners organization in 2019 due to shoulder impingement syndrome. Adcock also did not play in a game in 2020 due to the cancellation of the minor league season because of the COVID-19 pandemic.

On April 13, 2021, Adcock underwent Tommy John surgery and missed the entire season as a result. He returned to action in July 2022, and made his professional debut in rehabilitation with the rookie–level Arizona Complex League Mariners. He finished the year with the Single–A Modesto Nuts, logging a 9.00 earned run average with 6 strikeouts in 6 appearances.

Adcock was assigned to the High–A Everett AquaSox to begin the 2023 season, and was elevated to the Double–A Arkansas Travelers after 6 scoreless appearances. In 12 games for Arkansas, Adcock registered a 2.08 earned run average with 13 strikeouts and 2 saves in 13.0 innings pitched. On June 12, 2023, Adcock was selected to the 40-man roster and promoted to the major leagues for the first time following an injury to Penn Murfee. In his MLB debut, Adcock threw two scoreless innings without allowing a base runner. In 12 appearances for Seattle in his rookie campaign, he posted a 3.45 earned run average with 11 strikeouts across 15 2/3 innings of work.

Adcock was optioned to the Triple–A Tacoma Rainiers to begin the 2024 season. On April 8, 2024, he was designated for assignment by the Mariners.

=== Detroit Tigers ===
On April 15, 2024, Adcock was claimed off waivers by the Detroit Tigers. In 6 games for the Triple–A Toledo Mud Hens, he struggled to a 9.00 earned run average with 9 strikeouts across 6 innings of work. On May 18, Adcock was designated for assignment by Detroit.

=== New York Mets ===
On May 23, 2024, Adcock was claimed off waivers by the New York Mets. In 17 outings with the Triple-A Syracuse Mets, he had a 5.82 earned run average. He was called up to Queens on June 26, and got two outs in his debut in the sixth inning against the Houston Astros on June 29. After allowing six runs on July 5 in a game against the Pittsburgh Pirates, Adcock was optioned back to Syracuse on July 6. He was designated for assignment by the Mets on July 30. Adcock was released by the team the following day. On August 20, Adcock re–signed with the Mets organization on a minor league contract.

Adcock began the 2025 campaign with Triple-A Syracuse, posting a 1.29 earned run average with six strikeouts over his first six games. On May 1, 2025, the Mets selected Adcock's contract, adding him to their active roster. In three appearances for New York, he recorded a 3.00 ERA with five strikeouts over three innings of work. On August 26, Adcock was placed on outright waivers by the Mets; after going unclaimed, he was removed from the 40-man roster and sent outright to Syracuse two days later. He elected free agency following the season on November 6.

=== San Diego Padres ===
On December 4, 2025, Adcock signed a one-year contract with the San Diego Padres. Adcock was optioned to the Triple-A El Paso Chihuahuas to begin the 2026 season. In 11 appearances split between the rookie-level Arizona Complex League Padres, High-A Fort Wayne TinCaps, and El Paso, he posted a combined 1-0 record and 7.15 ERA with 15 strikeouts across 11 1/3 innings pitched. Adcock was designated for assignment by the Padres on June 14, 2026. He cleared waivers and was sent outright to El Paso on June 17. He elected free agency on November 2.
