= Cade Marlowe =

American baseball player (born 1997)

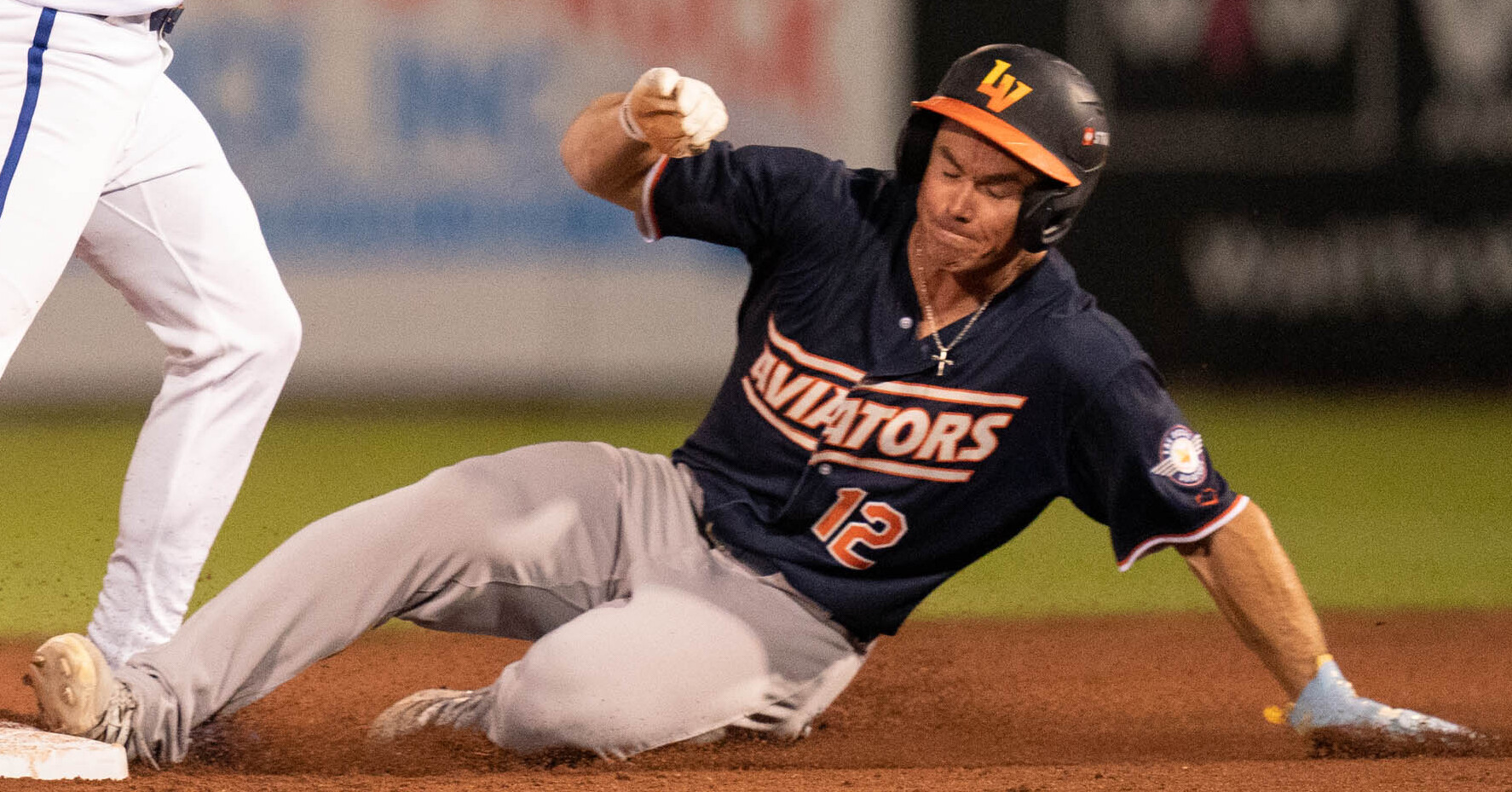
- Marlowe with the Las Vegas Aviators in 2026

Free agent
- Outfielder
- Born: June 24, 1997 (age 29); Tifton, Georgia, U.S.
- Bats: Left Throws: Right

MLB debut
- July 20, 2023, for the Seattle Mariners

MLB statistics (through 2024 season)
- Batting average: .240
- Home runs: 3
- Runs batted in: 11
- Stats at Baseball Reference

Teams
- Seattle Mariners (2023–2024)

Cade Matthew Marlowe (born June 24, 1997) is an American professional baseball outfielder who is a free agent. He has previously played in Major League Baseball (MLB) for the Seattle Mariners.

== Amateur career ==
Marlowe attended Tiftarea Academy in Chula, Georgia, where he played high school baseball. He batted .515 with 12 home runs, 35 RBIs, and 34 stolen bases as a senior in 2015. He was not drafted after high school and turned down his only Division I college baseball offer, from the College of William & Mary, to attend the University of West Georgia. During the summer of 2018, he played in the Coastal Plain League for the Savannah Bananas, which were then a collegiate summer baseball team. As a college senior in 2019, he batted .389 with five home runs and 39 RBIs and set a single season school record with 46 stolen bases.

== Professional career ==
=== Seattle Mariners ===
Marlowe was selected by the Seattle Mariners in the 20th round of the 2019 Major League Baseball draft. Marlowe signed with the Mariners, receiving a $5,000 signing bonus, and made his professional debut with the Everett AquaSox of the Low–A Northwest League, where he batted .301 with three home runs, 30 RBI, and 10 stolen bases in 62 games. He did not play in a game in 2020 due to the cancellation of the minor league season because of the COVID-19 pandemic.

Marlow began the 2021 season with the Low-A Modesto Nuts, where he was named the California League Player of the Month for May. The following month, Marlowe was promoted back to Everett, which was now at the High-A level. Marlowe was named the High-A West Player of the Month for July. After the Aquasox season ended, he played one game for the Triple-A Tacoma Rainiers. Over 106 games between the three teams, he slashed .275/.368/.566 with 26 home runs, 107 RBIs, 25 doubles, and 25 stolen bases. He was named the Most Valuable Player of High-A West. The Mariners also named him their Ken Griffey Jr. Minor League Hitter of the Year. He led all minor leaguers in RBIs in 2021. After the regular season, Marlowe played for the Peoria Javelinas in the Arizona Fall League, where he struggled to a .233 average in 24 games.

Marlowe began the 2022 season with the Arkansas Travelers of the Double-A Texas League. After the Travelers season ended, he was promoted to Tacoma, where he played 13 games. At a higher level of competition, he nearly matched his 2021 offensive performance, slashing .287/.377/.487 with 23 home runs, 102 RBIs, and 42 stolen bases in 133 games. On November 15, the Mariners added Marlowe to the 40-man roster to prevent him from being eligible for the Rule 5 draft.

Marlowe returned to Tacoma to begin the 2023 season. In 81 games for Tacoma, he batted .258/.338/.443 with 11 home runs, 52 RBI, and 29 stolen bases. On July 20, 2023, Marlowe was promoted to the major leagues for the first time, following an injury to Jarred Kelenic. He made his MLB debut that night as the starting left fielder for the Mariners against the Minnesota Twins. He went 0-for-3 with a walk. It took until his third game, on July 24, for Marlowe to earn his first base hit, a single off Twins starter Kenta Maeda.

On August 3, Marlowe hit a 405-foot go-ahead grand slam, his second MLB home run, in the top of the ninth inning against Los Angeles Angels closer Carlos Estévez, giving the Mariners a 5–3 lead. He was the first Mariner to hit a go-ahead grand slam while trailing in the ninth inning or extra innings since Richie Sexson on September 19, 2005. Marlowe's Mariners season ended early, as he was optioned to Tacoma on September 11 when Kelenic came off the injured list. He slumped before his demotion, getting only 4 hits in his last 30 at bats. In 34 games during his rookie campaign, he batted .239/.330/.421 with three home runs, 11 RBI, and four stolen bases in six attempts.

Marlowe began the 2024 season back in Tacoma. In 90 games with the Rainiers, he hit .236 with 13 home runs and 43 stolen bases, which paced the Pacific Coast League until he left the team in July and ultimately was fourth-most in the league in 2024. Marlowe was recalled by the Mariners on July 23 as Julio Rodríguez went on the injured list. In 8 games with the Mariners, Marlowe hit two singles and earned one walk in nine plate appearances. The Mariners optioned Marlowe to Tacoma on August 7, replacing him with Ryan Bliss. Marlowe did not play for the Rainiers again in 2024; he was placed on the team's injured list on August 29.

Marlowe was designated for assignment by the Mariners on February 3, 2025. He cleared waivers and was sent outright to Triple-A Tacoma on February 7. Marlowe made 52 appearances split between Tacoma, Everett, and the rookie-level Arizona Complex League Mariners, batting a cumulative .320/.411/.471 with four home runs, 26 RBI, and 14 stolen bases. He elected free agency following the season on November 6.

=== Athletics ===
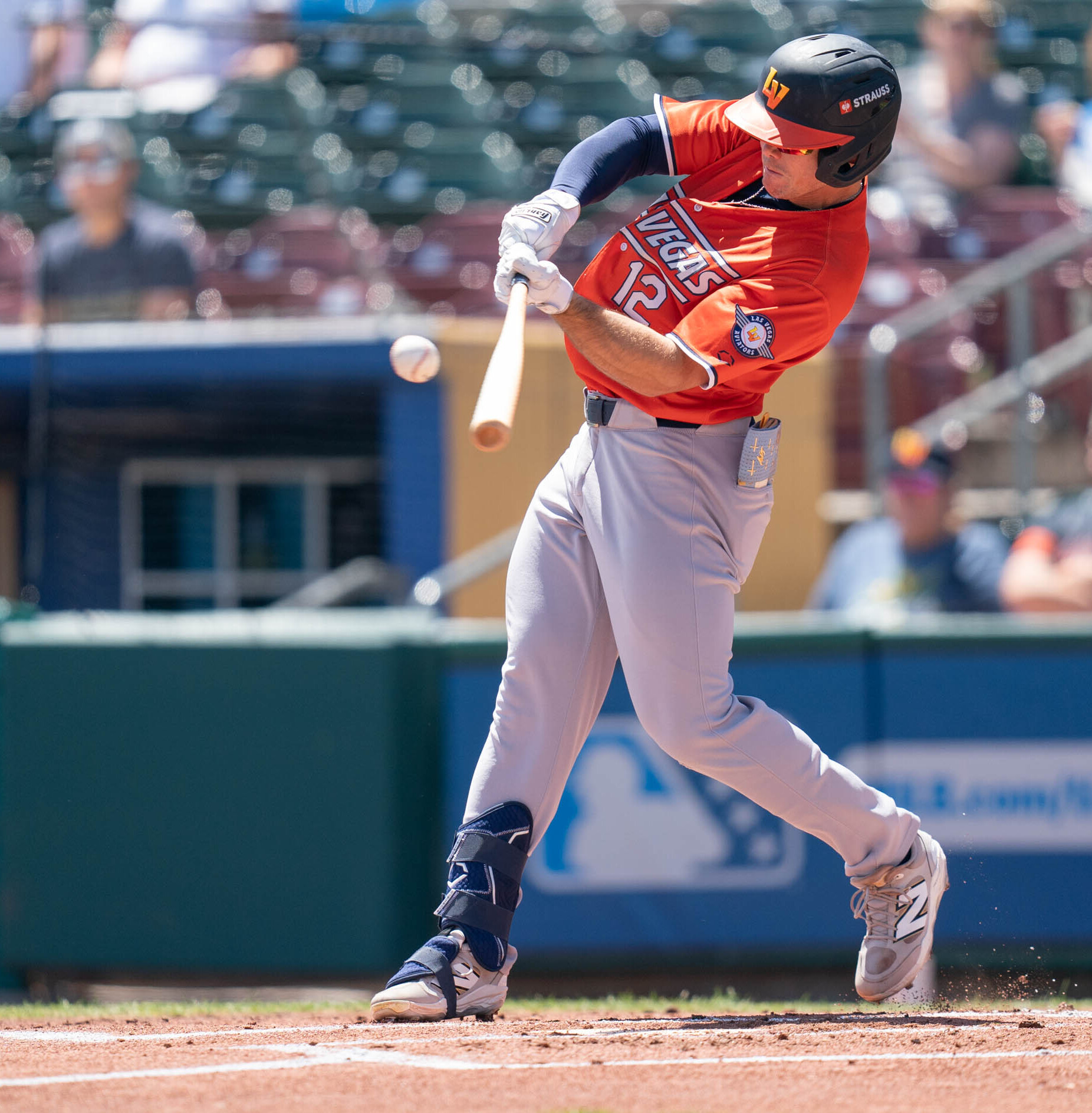
Marlowe with the Aviators in 2026

On December 19, 2025, Marlowe signed a minor league contract with the Athletics. He began the 2026 season with the Triple-A Las Vegas Aviators, where he slashed .317/.394/.521 with seven home runs, 50 RBI, and 24 stolen bases across 81 appearances. On July 17, 2026, Marlowe exercised an opt-out clause in his contract and became a free agent.

=== Los Angeles Angels ===
On July 21, 2026, Marlowe signed a minor league contract with the Los Angeles Angels. On August 27, 2026, Marlowe exercised an opt-out clause in his contract, allowing the Angels the option to add him to their 40-man roster or to grant him a release. On August 28, Marlowe was released by the Angels. The next day, he re-signed with the Angels on a new minor league contract. He played in 38 games with the Triple-A Salt Lake Bees and batted .310 with five home runs and 18 RBI. He elected free agency on November 2.

== Personal life ==
Marlowe graduated magna cume laude from college with a degree in biology. He planned to become a medical doctor before becoming a professional baseball player.
