= Juan Then =

Dominican baseball player (born 2000)

Free agent
- Pitcher
- Born: February 7, 2000 (age 26); San Francisco de Macoris, Dominican Republic
- Bats: Right Throws: Right

MLB debut
- May 6, 2023, for the Seattle Mariners

MLB statistics (through 2023 season)
- Win–loss record: 0–0
- Earned run average: 4.91
- Strikeouts: 5
- Stats at Baseball Reference

Teams
- Seattle Mariners (2023)

Juan Manuel Then (/ˈtɛn/; born February 7, 2000) is a Dominican professional baseball pitcher who is a free agent. He has previously played in Major League Baseball (MLB) for the Seattle Mariners.

== Career ==
=== Seattle Mariners ===
Then signed with the Seattle Mariners as an international free agent on July 2, 2016, receiving a $77,500 signing bonus. He made his professional debut in 2017, starting 13 games for the Dominican Summer League Mariners and logging a 2–2 record and 2.64 ERA in 61 1/3 innings, the biggest workload in his professional career.

=== New York Yankees ===
On November 18, 2017, the Mariners traded Then and JP Sears to the New York Yankees for Nick Rumbelow. Then spent the 2018 season with the rookie-level Gulf Coast Yankees, where he started 11 games and posted an 0–3 record and 2.70 ERA with 42 strikeouts across 50.0 innings pitched.

=== Seattle Mariners (second stint) ===
On June 15, 2019, the Yankees traded Then back to the Seattle Mariners organization in exchange for Edwin Encarnación. He spent the remainder of the season split between the rookie-level Arizona League Mariners, Low-A Everett AquaSox, and Single-A West Virginia Power. In 11 combined appearances (9 starts), Then recorded a 1–5 record and 2.98 ERA with 48 strikeouts in 48 1/3 innings of work. Then did not play in a game in 2020 due to the cancellation of the minor league season because of the COVID-19 pandemic.

On November 20, 2020, the Mariners added Then to their 40-man roster to protect him from the Rule 5 draft. He played the entire 2021 season in Everett, starting 14 games and struggling to a 2–5 record and 6.46 ERA with 59 strikeouts in 54 1/3 innings. Then missed the beginning of the 2022 season with an unspecified elbow injury. He was activated in August and made 10 appearances for the Double-A Arkansas Travelers, recording a 5.40 ERA with 14 strikeouts. Then returned to Arkansas to begin the 2023 season. He made 7 appearances for Arkansas, registering a 5.00 ERA with 11 strikeouts and 3 saves in 9 innings pitched.

On May 6, 2023, Then was promoted to the major leagues for the first time following an injury to Penn Murfee. Then made his major league debut that night, pitching a perfect seventh inning for the Mariners against the Houston Astros. In 9 appearances for Seattle, he had a 4.91 ERA with 5 strikeouts in 11 innings of work. On August 12, Then was removed from the 40–man roster and sent outright to the Triple-A Tacoma Rainiers. He elected free agency following the season on November 6.

=== Chicago White Sox ===
On January 24, 2024, Then signed a minor league contract with the Chicago White Sox. In 14 appearances split between the Double-A Birmingham Barons and Triple-A Charlotte Knights, he struggled to a 10.80 ERA with 8 strikeouts across 13 1/3 innings pitched. Then was released by the White Sox on July 8.

=== Bravos de León ===
On May 20, 2025, Then signed with the Bravos de León of the Mexican League. He made one appearance for León, failing to record and out and allowing one run on one hit, one walk, and one hit by pitch. Then was released by the Bravos on May 23.
