= Sam Haggerty =

American baseball player (born 1994)

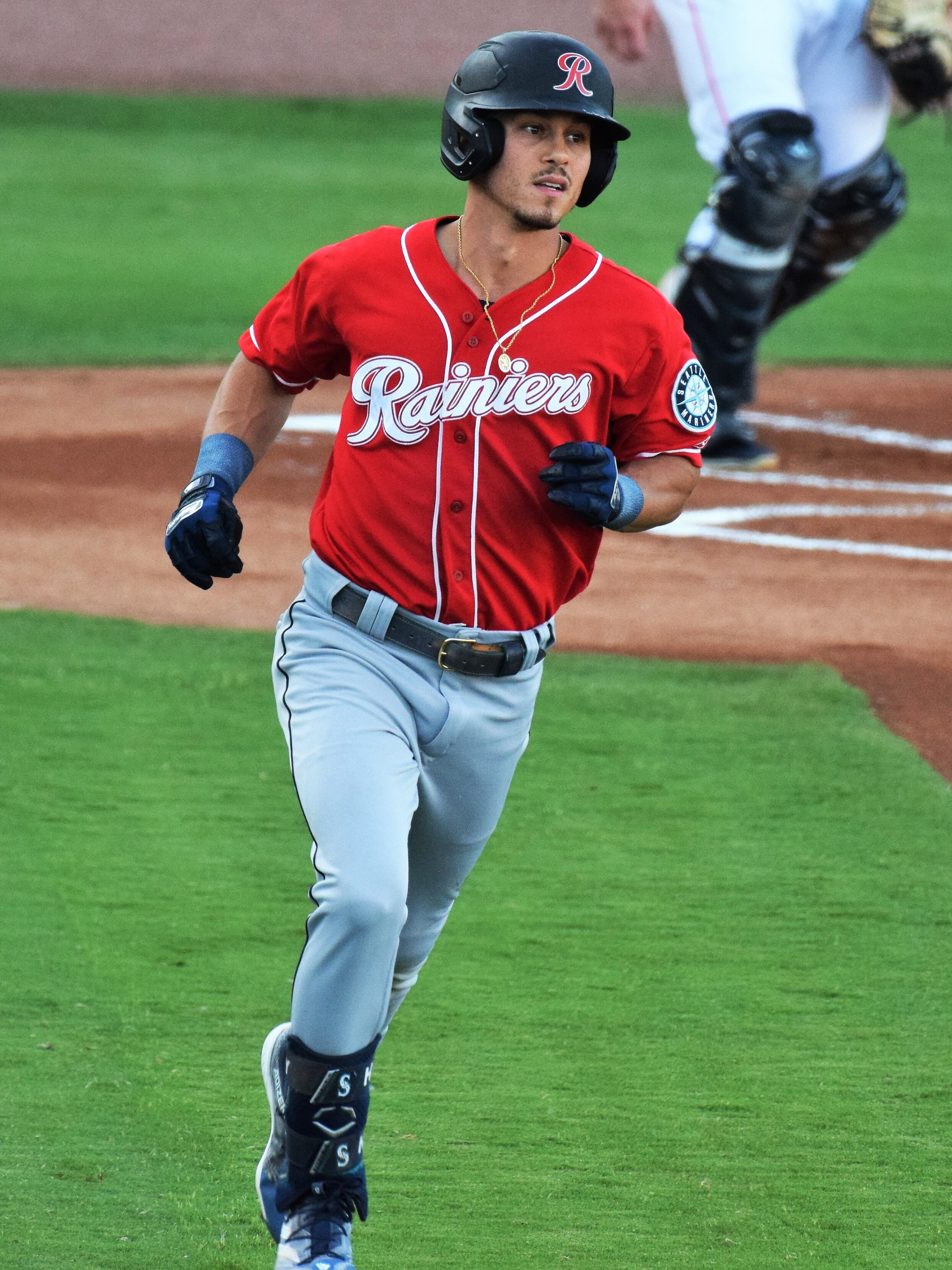
- Haggerty with the Tacoma Rainiers in 2023

Free agent
- Outfielder
- Born: May 26, 1994 (age 32); Phoenix, Arizona, U.S.
- Bats: Switch Throws: Right

MLB debut
- September 4, 2019, for the New York Mets

MLB statistics (through May 30, 2026)
- Batting average: .232
- Home runs: 11
- Runs batted in: 54
- Stolen bases: 47
- Stats at Baseball Reference

Teams
- New York Mets (2019); Seattle Mariners (2020–2024); Texas Rangers (2025–2026)

Samuel Onofrio Haggerty (born May 26, 1994) is an American professional baseball outfielder who is a free agent. He has previously played in Major League Baseball (MLB) for the New York Mets, Seattle Mariners, and Texas Rangers.

== Career ==
=== Amateur career ===
Haggerty attended Mullen High School in Denver, Colorado and the University of New Mexico, where he played college baseball for the New Mexico Lobos. In 2013, he was named a co-Freshman of the Year of the Mountain West Conference and named to the second-team all-conference team and the Louisville Slugger Freshmen All-American team. He led to Lobos with 47 walks and 16 sacrifice bunts, which was a single-season Lobos record. In 2014, he was named to the first-team all-conference team, hitting .340 and leading the team with 14 stolen bases and 35 walks. After his sophomore season, he played collegiate summer baseball with the Hyannis Harbor Hawks of the Cape Cod Baseball League. In his third and final year with the Lobos, he hit .311 but missed 30 games due to a strained oblique injury, snapping a streak of playing more than 100 consecutive games for the Lobos.

=== Cleveland Indians ===
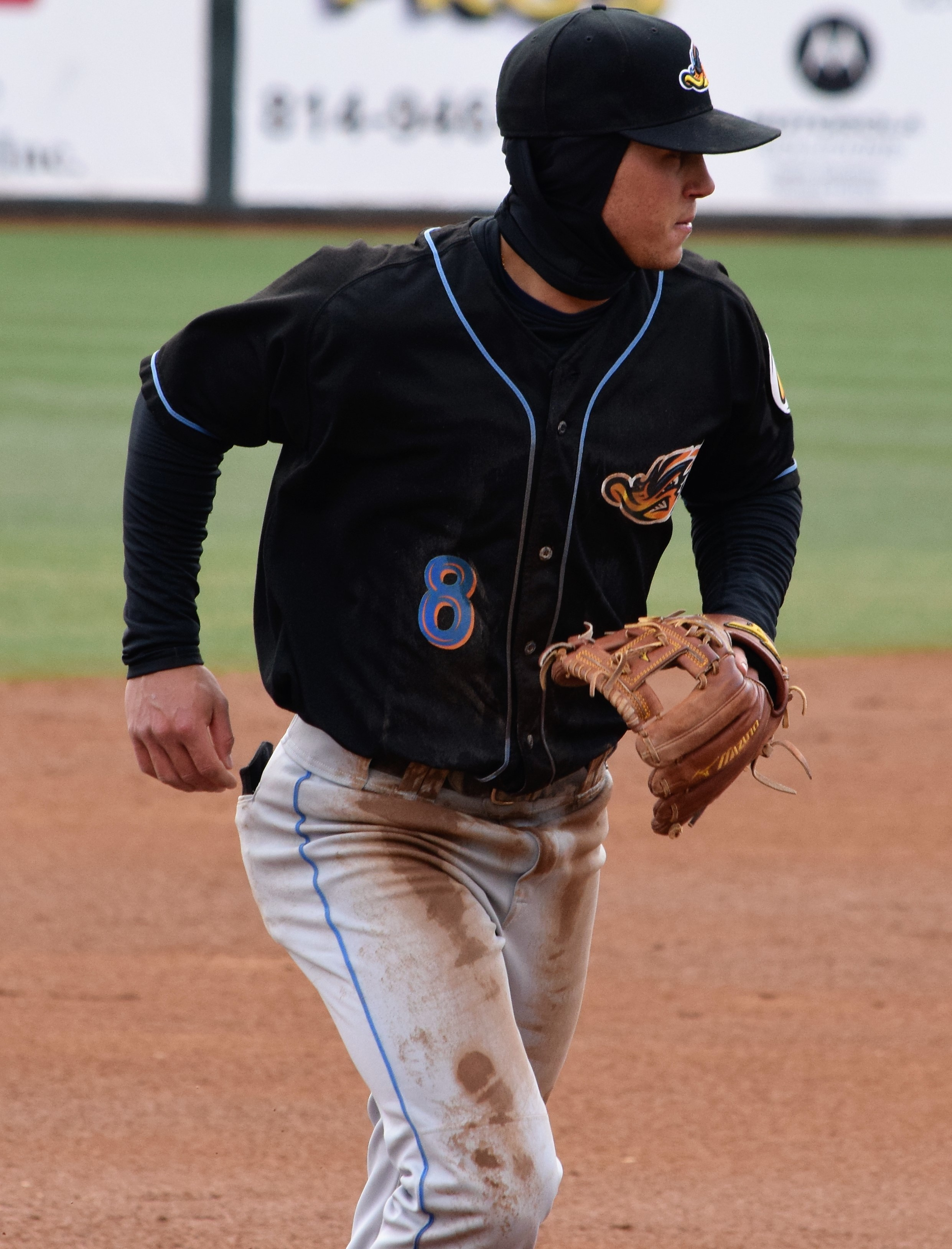
Haggerty with the RubberDucks in 2018

Haggerty was drafted by the Cleveland Indians in the 24th round of the 2015 MLB draft. He steadily moved up the team's minor league season, advancing at least one level for the next few years. Haggerty began his minor league career in 2015 with the Mahoning Valley Scrappers, hitting .283/.361/.453/ with 1 home run and 7 RBI. In 2016, he played for the Lake County Captains, hitting .230/.323/.320 with 4 home runs and 39 RBI. In 2017, with the Lynchburg Hillcats, he hit .253/.355/.398 with 3 home runs and 32 RBI. His 49 stolen bases were the most in a professional season. He split 2018 between the Akron RubberDucks and the Columbus Clippers, combining to hit .239/.369/.384 with 4 home runs and 39 RBI.

=== New York Mets ===
On January 6, 2019, Haggerty and pitcher Walker Lockett were traded to the New York Mets for catcher Kevin Plawecki. Haggerty spent most of the 2019 minor league season with the Binghamton Rumble Ponies, also playing 6 games with the Brooklyn Cyclones and 12 games with the Syracuse Mets in August. He hit .271/.369/.387 for the three Mets affiliates with 3 home runs and 26 RBI.

On September 1, 2019, the Mets selected Haggerty's contract and promoted him to the major leagues. He made his major league debut on September 4 as a pinch runner versus the Washington Nationals. He appeared in 11 games, all as a substitute, eight times as a pinch runner and three times as a pinch hitter. He batted 0-for-4 with the Mets with three strikeouts, but scored twice as a pinch runner. On December 24, he was designated for assignment by the Mets.

=== Seattle Mariners ===
Haggerty was claimed off waivers by the Seattle Mariners on January 10, 2020. In his first at bat with the Mariners on August 19, 25 games into the shortened 2020 season, he got his first MLB hit, a single off Julio Urias of the Los Angeles Dodgers. Haggerty stole his first base in the majors two batters later. Haggerty began his Mariners tenure with an 8-game hitting streak, which included his first home run. His season ended on September 7, when he was placed on the 10-day injured list with a left forearm strain. On the season, he hit .260/.315/.400 with the lone home run and 4 stolen bases in 13 games.

On April 13, 2021, Haggerty hit a home run onto Eutaw Street in Camden Yards in Baltimore, the first Mariner to do so since Ken Griffey Jr. in 1994. On May 5, Haggerty prevented the Mariners from being the victims of a perfect game by Baltimore Orioles pitcher John Means. Haggerty was the only baserunner in Mean's no-hitter, reaching base on a dropped third strike, then getting caught trying to steal second base. On June 7, Haggerty was placed on the 60-day injured list with right shoulder inflammation, ending his season. He posted a .186/.247/.291 slash line with 5 stolen bases in 6 attempts. He struck out in almost 30 percent of his plate appearances. On October 22, Haggerty was outrighted off the Mariners' 40-man roster.

In 2022, Haggerty began the season with the Triple-A Tacoma Rainiers. He had several stints with the Mariners, joining the team on May 22, then being optioned to Tacoma on June 17 before being recalled to Seattle on June 29. On July 14, Haggerty hit the Mariners' first inside-the-park home run in 15 years, hitting a line drive that Gold Glover Leody Taveras failed to catch on the fly. Haggerty was sent down to His season ended on October 3, when he sustained a groin injury while stealing second base. He finished the year with a .256 batting average, a .738 on base plus slugging, and 13 stolen bases in 83 games.

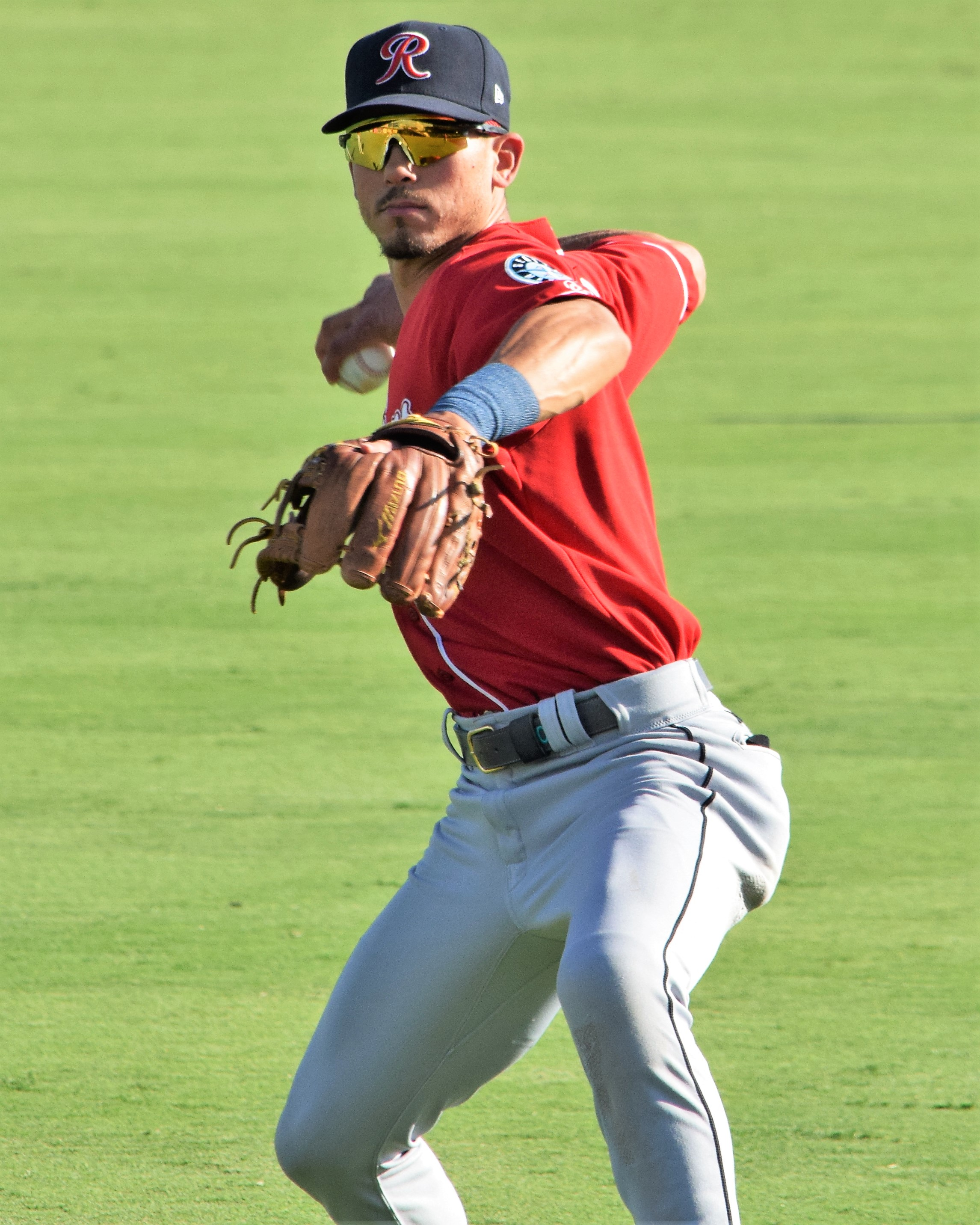
Haggerty with the Rainiers in 2023

Haggerty played in 52 games for Seattle in 2023, batting .253/.364/.341 with one home run, five RBI, and ten stolen bases. His playing time was due to going on the 7-day concussion list in April and being sent down to Tacoma from June 6 to August 11, then again from August 21 to September 1.

Haggerty began the 2024 season on the injured list as the result of a personal medical issue unrelated to baseball. On April 17, he was activated from the injured list and optioned to Triple-A Tacoma. He was recalled on April 29 and appeared in eight games for the Mariners, going 1-for-15 with one RBI and one stolen base. He was optioned back to Tacoma on May 15. For the fourth consecutive year, an injury ended Haggerty's season early. On May 18, he suffered a torn Achilles tendon while trying to catch a fly ball and colliding with the outfield fence. The Mariners called up Haggerty on May 27 and immediately placed him on the 60-day injured list. The move opened a roster spot for the Mariners, used to promote Ryan Bliss, and allowed Haggerty to accrue MLB service time. On November 22, the Mariners non–tendered Haggerty, making him a free agent.

=== Texas Rangers ===
On February 3, 2025, Haggerty signed a minor league contract with the Texas Rangers. He opened the season with the Triple-A Round Rock Express. On May 9, the Rangers selected Haggerty's contract, adding him to their active roster. In 64 appearances for Texas, he batted .253/.328/.370 with two home runs, 13 RBI, and 12 stolen bases. On July 18, Haggerty was placed on the injured list due to left ankle inflammation. He was transferred to the 60-day injured list on September 24, ending his season.

Haggerty made the Rangers' Opening Day roster entering the 2026 season. He made 35 appearances for Texas, batting .159/.213/.182 with one RBI and two stolen bases. On June 5, 2026, Haggerty was designated for assignment by the Rangers. He was released by the team two days later.

=== Cincinnati Reds ===
On June 13, 2026, Haggerty signed a minor league contract with the Cincinnati Reds. He made 28 appearances for the Triple–A Louisville Bats, slashing .205/.293/.273 with one home run, five RBI, and two stolen bases. Haggerty was released by the Reds organization on August 6.

== Personal life ==
Haggerty uses the theme music from The Godfather, his favorite movie, for his walk-up music to honor his mother Lisa and his Italian heritage. Lisa and his father Kevin were both college athletes at Grand Canyon University.

Haggerty started a clothing brand called Epic Soul in 2020.

His brash playing style and personal flair earned him the nickname "Ham Swaggerty" or "Swaggerty" with fans and broadcasters.

His favorite athlete as a child was Roberto Clemente.

Haggerty was inducted into the Mullen High School Athletic Hall of Fame in September 2024.
