= Dominic Canzone =

American baseball player (born 1997)

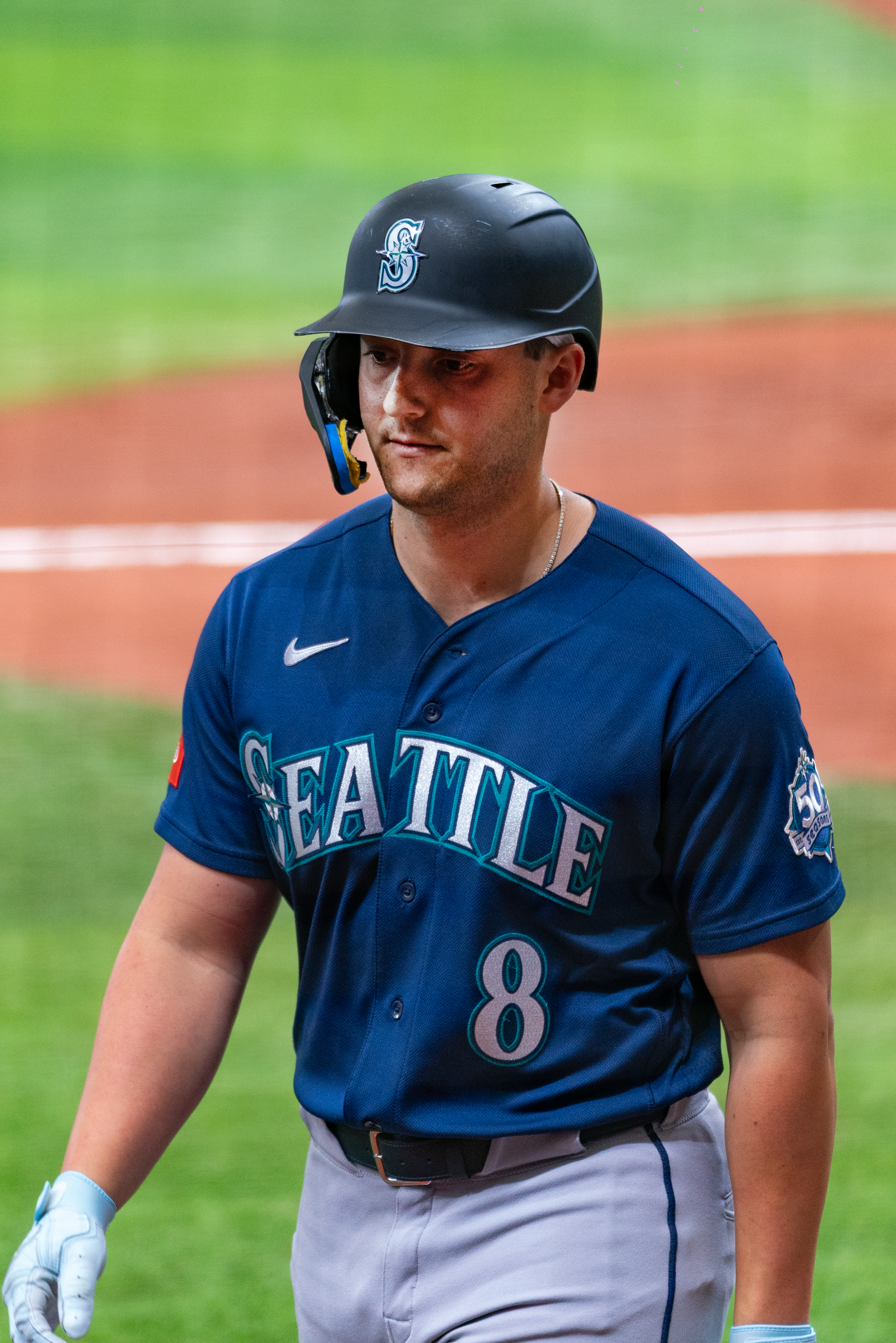
- Canzone with the Seattle Mariners in 2026

Seattle Mariners – No. 8
- Outfielder
- Born: August 16, 1997 (age 29); Cleveland, Ohio, U.S.
- Bats: Left Throws: Right

MLB debut
- July 8, 2023, for the Arizona Diamondbacks

MLB statistics (through 2026 season)
- Batting average: .254
- Home runs: 48
- Runs batted in: 147
- Stats at Baseball Reference

Teams
- Arizona Diamondbacks (2023); Seattle Mariners (2023–present)

Dominic Gene Canzone (born August 16, 1997) is an American professional baseball outfielder for the Seattle Mariners of Major League Baseball (MLB). He made his MLB debut for the Arizona Diamondbacks in July 2023 and was traded to the Mariners later that month.

== Amateur career ==
Canzone attended Walsh Jesuit High School in Cuyahoga Falls, Ohio. As a sophomore in 2014, he pitched 16 1/3 scoreless innings and batted .434 with three home runs and 27 RBIs. He earned All-Ohio honorable mention as a senior in 2016. Unselected in the 2016 Major League Baseball draft, he enrolled at Ohio State University where he played college baseball.

As a freshman at Ohio State in 2017, Canzone started 39 games and batted .343 with three home runs, 36 RBIs, and 13 stolen bases, earning a unanimous selection to the All-Big Ten freshman team. In 2018, Canzone started 60 games and hit .323 with four home runs, 35 RBIs, 18 doubles, and 15 stolen bases. After the season, he played collegiate summer baseball with the Brewster Whitecaps of the Cape Cod Baseball League, where he was named a league all-star. As a junior in 2019, Canzone started 63 games and batted .345 with 16 home runs and 43 RBIs. He was a team captain and set a Buckeyes baseball record, previously held by Nick Swisher, with a 59-game on-base streak and led the Big Ten in hits and slugging percentage. He was named a third-team All-American by Rawlings.

== Professional career ==
=== Arizona Diamondbacks ===
==== Draft and minor leagues (2019–2023) ====
Canzone was selected by the Arizona Diamondbacks in the eighth round with the 242nd overall pick of the 2019 Major League Baseball draft. He signed for $170,000 and made his professional debut with the Missoula Osprey of the Rookie Advanced Pioneer League. He was promoted in early August to the Hillsboro Hops of the Class A-Short Season Northwest League. Over 46 games between the two clubs, he batted .281 with eight home runs, 38 RBIs, and 19 doubles.

Canzone did not play in the minor leagues in 2020 because the season was cancelled due to the COVID-19 pandemic. He missed time in May and August 2021 due to injury but appeared in 44 games between Hillsboro, now in High-A West, before earning a promotion to the Double-A Amarillo Sod Poodles of the Texas League in late July, where he played 35 games. He slashed .302/.375/.522 with 14 home runs, 52 RBIs, and 19 stolen bases in 2021. After the season, he played in the Arizona Fall League for the Salt River Rafters, where he had a solid .905 on-base plus slugging in 78 plate appearances.

Canzone returned to Amarillo to begin the 2022 season. After 11 games, he was promoted to the Reno Aces of the Triple-A Pacific Coast League. He was placed on the injured list with an oblique injury on June 23, returning to Reno by early August following a short rehab assignment. Over 106 games in 2022, he slashed .299/.367/.541 with 22 home runs, 89 RBIs, 25 doubles, and 15 stolen bases. He was named a Diamondbacks organizational All-Star by MiLB.com.

To open the 2023 season, Canzone returned to Reno, where he had the best offensive stretch of his career: he batted .354/.431/.634 with 16 home runs and 71 RBIs in 71 games.

==== MLB debut (2023) ====
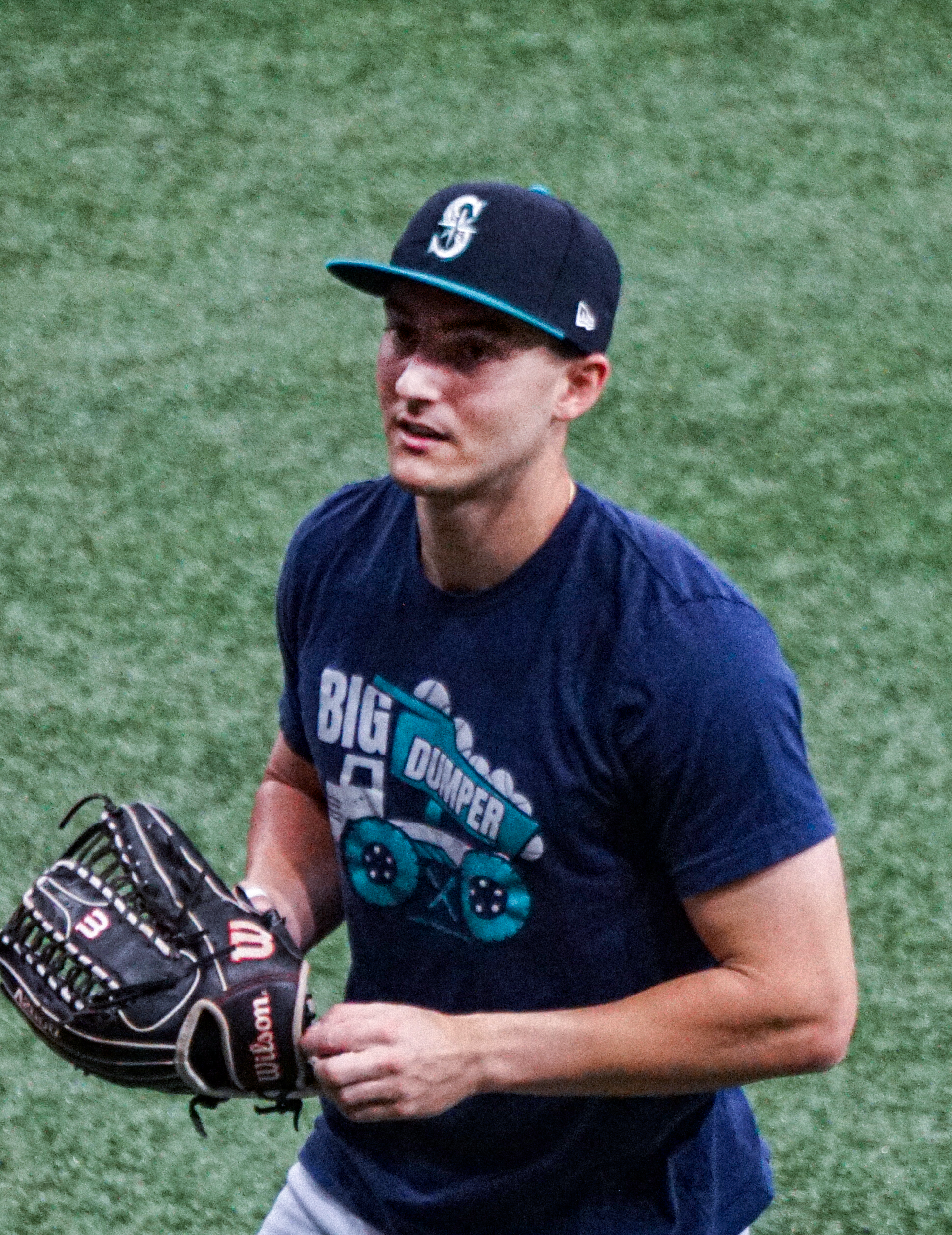
Canzone in 2023

On July 7, 2023, Canzone was selected to Arizona's 40-man roster and promoted to the major leagues for the first time. He debuted that night as a designated hitter, going hitless but drawing a walk and scoring the tying run in the tenth inning of a Diamondbacks win. Canzone hit his first career home run on July 20, off Atlanta Braves ace Spencer Strider. In the first 15 games to start his major league career, Canzone hit .237 with the solitary home run for Arizona.

=== Seattle Mariners ===
On July 31, 2023, the Diamondbacks traded Canzone and infielders Josh Rojas and Ryan Bliss to the Seattle Mariners for closer Paul Sewald. Canzone played in most of the Mariners' games the final two months of the season, primarily in left field but also as a left-handed pinch hitter. He hit .215/.248/.407 with five home runs in 44 games. Canzone would regularly celebrate big plays with a "finger pinch" hand gesture, a nod to his Italian-American heritage.

On April 1, 2024, Canzone hit a three-run home run for his first home run of the 2024 season. After showing improved power, with a .531 slugging percentage in his first 14 games of 2024, Canzone missed a month after crashing into the outfield wall catching a flyball. He returned to the Mariners on May 15 but hit only .209 with eight extra base hits in his next 40 games. He went back on the injured list on July 9, missing another month with a right adductor strain. He returned on August 9, but his hitting worsened. He went 3-for-26 with one home run and two doubles before being optioned down to the Triple-A Tacoma Rainiers on August 28. Over 67 games for Seattle in 2024, Canzone hit .196 with eight home runs and 17 RBIs.

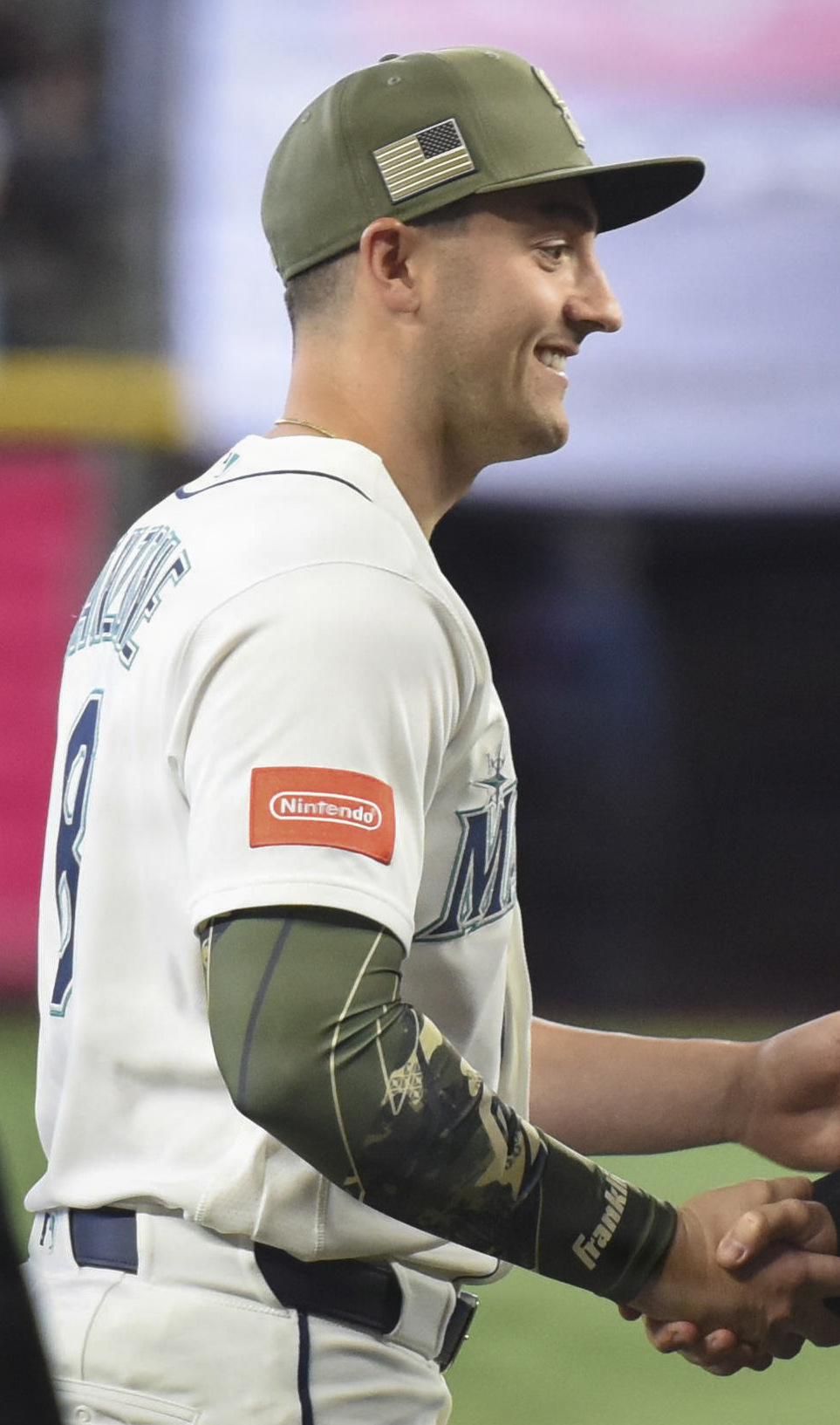
Canzone in 2026

Canzone was optioned to Triple-A Tacoma to begin the 2025 season. He was called up on April 7, to replace Victor Robles, who was injured in a game against the Giants. Canzone was optioned to Tacoma on April 13 and was placed on the injured list four days later with a left shoulder sprain. He was activated in May and recalled by Seattle again on June 9, and spent the rest of the season with the team. On September 16, Canzone went 5-for-5 with three home runs and four RBIs in a 12–5 win over the Kansas City Royals. It was his first three-homer game, and he became the 12th player in franchise history to hit three home runs in one game. Canzone appeared in 82 games for Seattle and hit .300 with 11 home runs and 32 RBIs. In the postseason, he batted 3-for-28 with one run scored.

Canzone hit two solo home runs against the Cleveland Guardians on Opening Day in 2026. He hit his first career grand slam on May 12 off Tatsuya Imai of the Houston Astros. Canzone played in 146 games for the Mariners and batted .264 with 23 home runs and 77 RBIs.

== International career ==
Canzone played for Italy in the 2026 World Baseball Classic. He hit a home run in Italy's first game, a win over Brazil. He hit .188 with four walks in four games in the tournament.

== Personal life ==
Canzone has three siblings. His mother was diagnosed with breast cancer while Canzone was in elementary school. She recovered after two years of treatment, including chemotherapy. His mother gifted him a baseball card that contained a uniform patch he wore during his MLB debut.

As a child, Canzone was a fan of the Cleveland Indians. His favorite players were Ken Griffey Jr., Kenny Lofton, and Adam Dunn.

Canzone returned to Ohio State and finished his bachelor's degree in 2020, following the cancellation of the Minor League Baseball season.
