= Tayler Saucedo =

American baseball player (born 1993)

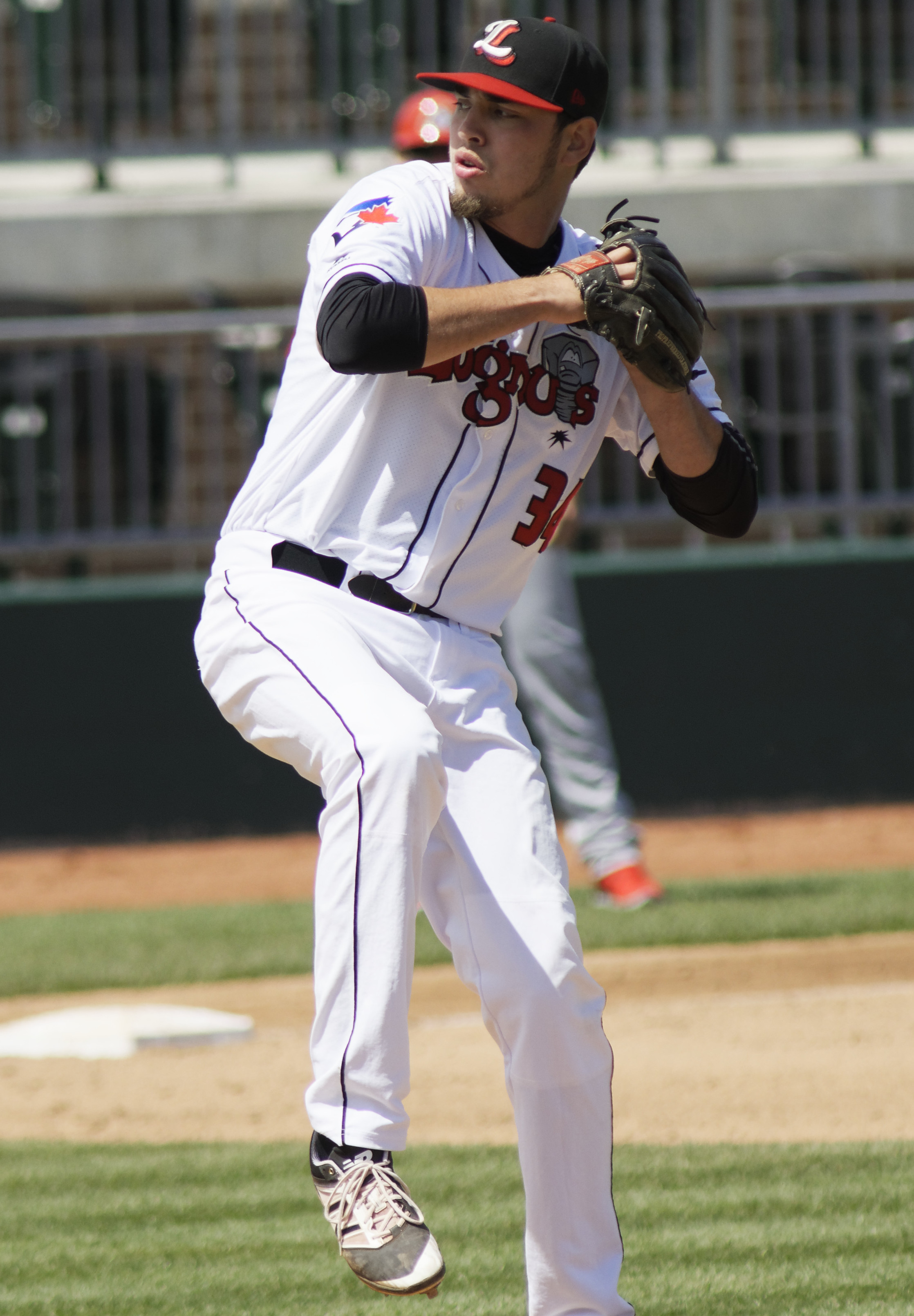
- Saucedo with the Lansing Lugnuts in 2017

Los Angeles Angels – No. 55
- Pitcher
- Born: June 18, 1993 (age 33); Honolulu, Hawaii, U.S.
- Bats: Left Throws: Left

MLB debut
- June 17, 2021, for the Toronto Blue Jays

MLB statistics (through 2026 season)
- Win–loss record: 6–3
- Earned run average: 4.10
- Strikeouts: 138
- Stats at Baseball Reference

Teams
- Toronto Blue Jays (2021–2022); Seattle Mariners (2023–2025); Los Angeles Angels (2026–present)

Tayler Andrew Saucedo (born June 18, 1993) is an American professional baseball pitcher for the Los Angeles Angels of Major League Baseball (MLB). He has previously played in MLB for the Toronto Blue Jays and Seattle Mariners. He was drafted by the Blue Jays in the 21st round of the 2015 MLB draft and made his MLB debut for them in 2021. He is listed at 6 feet 5 inches (1.96 m) and 185 pounds (84 kg).

== Early life ==
Saucedo's father was in the Marines, so his family moved regularly as a child, including stops in Hawaii, Japan, Seattle, and Texas. While living in Japan, Saucedo was introduced to baseball. As a child, Saucedo began to pursue being a pitcher when he would pitch against older children. His father was required to sign a waiver to allow him to play against 12 year olds.

In middle school, Saucedo was selected for the Little League All Stars. He later played varsity baseball at Tahoma High School in Maple Valley, Washington. He was originally cut from the team in 10th grade and then failed to record a single win in his junior season. Following his junior year, Saucedo cited his lack of confidence as a factor for his poor season. He improved to 7–1 in his senior campaign as he led the Bears to a South Puget Sound League North Division title. Saucedo was selected for the 2011 Washington State Baseball Coaches Association Class 4A All-State second team and the 2011 South Puget Sound League All-North Division first team.

== College career ==
Due to poor grades, Saucedo began his collegiate career at Tacoma Community College, pitching in six games for their baseball team in 2012. He dropped out of TCC during his sophomore year. He was named a Top 200 Junior College Prospect before 2013, but did not play college baseball that season. He played for the Martinsville Mustangs in the Coastal Plain League in the summer of 2013.

Saucedo then played for the Tennessee Wesleyan Bulldogs, an NAIA program, in 2014 and 2015. In April 2015, Saucedo earned the Appalachian Athletic Conference Baseball Pitcher of the Week award after a complete-game, one-hit shutout win. He rebounded from a poor year in 2014, with a 6.34 ERA in 20 games, to a 5–2 record and 1.96 ERA in 16 games, nine of them starts, in 2015.

== Professional career ==
=== Toronto Blue Jays ===
==== 2015–2020: Minor League Baseball ====
The Toronto Blue Jays selected Saucedo in the 21st round, 632nd overall, of the 2015 Major League Baseball draft. Saucedo made his professional debut that summer with the Bluefield Blue Jays of the Rookie Appalachian League, pitching 22 1/3 innings with 1 win, 1 save, a 2.42 ERA, and 18 strikeouts. After one month, he moved up to the Low-A Vancouver Canadians, In his second Canadians game on August 8, 2015, Saucedo pitched six scoreless innings to lead the team to a 5–1 over the Spokane Indians. By the end of August, Saucedo had struck out 17 batters in 20 innings with several pitches, including a fastball, curveball, slider, and change-up. He finished the season with a 4–2 record and 2.48 ERA in 13 games for Vancouver.

Saucedo spent the 2016 season with the Single-A Lansing Lugnuts. He threw his only professional shutout on June 25, allowing nine hits while blanking the West Michigan Whitecaps. He was moved to the bullpen at the start of August, making his final 8 appearances as a reliever. He had an 8–11 record and 5.91 ERA in 2016, with 71 strikeouts in 120 1/3 innings. Saucedo returned to Lansing to start 2017, moving up to the High-A Dunedin Blue Jays in mid-June. He recorded a 5-3 record and 4.48 ERA in 33 appearances for the year. After the American season, he played winter baseball for the Canberra Cavalry in the Australian Baseball League.

Saucedo began 2018 back in Dunedin and was promoted at the end of June to the Double-A New Hampshire Fisher Cats. Working full-time as a starter, he had a 10-9 record and 4.21 ERA in 26 games for the two teams and helped New Hampshire win the 2018 Eastern League title. Continuing his promotion pattern, he started 2019 in New Hampshire, then advanced mid-season to the Triple-A Buffalo Bisons. He threw five games for Buffalo one month into the season, then returned to the Fisher Cats from May 23 to June 12 before sticking in Buffalo the rest of 2019. He was primarily a reliever, starting in eight of his 36 appearances and topping out at five innings pitched in only one game. He had an 8-2 record and 3.61 ERA with 69 strikeouts in 82 1/3 innings.

Saucedo did not play in a game in 2020 due to the cancellation of the minor league season because of the COVID-19 pandemic. He continued to train but later said that the lack of regular baseball activity worsened his mental health.

==== 2021–2022: Promotion, injury, and waived ====
Saucedo reached the major leagues in 2021 but could not solidify a role with the Blue Jays, being taken off the active roster several times. He also converted full-time to a relief role. He began the season in Buffalo, pitching to a 2–1 record and 2.20 ERA in 10 appearances for the team. On June 12, Saucedo was selected to the 40-man roster and promoted to the majors. Saucedo made his MLB debut on June 17, his 28th birthday, pitching a scoreless inning of relief against the New York Yankees. He notched his first career strikeout in his debut, punching out Miguel Andújar. He was optioned to Buffalo on August 1 but recalled to Toronto three days later, without throwing a pitch in the minors. On September 11, he was optioned again to Buffalo, replaced by pitcher Anthony Castro. He came back to Toronto on September 19, pitched twice against the Tampa Bay Rays, and was optioned once more on September 23. He appeared in 29 games for Toronto in his rookie campaign, with no decisions, a 4.56 ERA, and 19 strikeouts in 25 2/3 innings. He was particularly effective against left-handed batters, allowing a .411 OPS in 41 plate appearances, compared to .820 against righties. He only pitched twice for Buffalo after first being called up to the Blue Jays.

Saucedo pitched in relief for the Blue Jays on Opening Day in 2022, entering in the first inning and allowing a home run and double in 1 2/3 innings. After one more appearance, he was optioned to Buffalo on April 11, returning to the Blue Jays 10 days later. In his fourth appearance with the Jays on April 29, he hurt his right hip while fielding a ground ball. The Blue Jays placed him on the 10-day injured list on April 30, moving him to the 60-day injured list on June 29. He pitched 18 times for Buffalo from June through September while on a rehab assignment, with a 2.76 ERA, but did not return to Toronto.

On November 9, 2022, Saucedo was claimed off waivers by the New York Mets. Saucedo was designated for assignment by the Mets on January 24, 2023, after the Mets signed Tommy Pham.

=== Seattle Mariners ===
On January 31, 2023, Saucedo was claimed off waivers by the Seattle Mariners. Saucedo was optioned to the Triple-A Tacoma Rainiers to begin the 2023 season, but on April 18, he was recalled to the Mariners, spending the rest of the season in the majors. He appeared in 52 games with a 3–2 record, one save, and 3.59 earned run average. Saucedo replicated his production in 2024, with a 2–0 record, three saves and a 3.49 ERA in 53 games. With the Mariners, Saucedo used his changeup as his second pitch, rather than his slider, and also began throwing more sweepers that moved more horizontally than his slider. In 2024, the Mariners deployed him almost equally against left-handed hitters, where he continued to show a platoon advantage.

Saucedo made 10 appearances for Seattle in 2025, but struggled to a 7.43 ERA with 12 strikeouts across 13 1/3 innings pitched. On November 18, 2025, Saucedo was designated for assignment by the Mariners following the acquisition of Alex Hoppe. On November 21, he was non-tendered by Seattle and became a free agent.

=== Los Angeles Angels ===
On December 30, 2025, Saucedo signed a minor league contract with the Los Angeles Angels. He was assigned to the Triple-A Salt Lake Bees to begin the regular season, where he recorded a 4.30 ERA with 15 strikeouts across 12 games. On May 3, 2026, the Angels selected Saucedo's contract, adding him to their active roster.

== Personal life ==
Saucedo was born in Honolulu, Hawaii to mother Tanya and father Andy. He has known his stepfather Steve Honn since he was seven years old. Saucedo is of Mexican descent.
