= Matt Brash (baseball) =

Canadian baseball player (born 1998)

Seattle Mariners – No. 47
- Pitcher
- Born: May 12, 1998 (age 28); Kingston, Ontario, Canada
- Bats: Right Throws: Right

MLB debut
- April 12, 2022, for the Seattle Mariners

MLB statistics (through 2026 season)
- Win–loss record: 17–11
- Earned run average: 3.06
- Strikeouts: 242
- Stats at Baseball Reference

Teams
- Seattle Mariners (2022–2023, 2025–present)

Matthew Aurel Brash (born May 12, 1998) is a Canadian professional baseball pitcher for the Seattle Mariners of Major League Baseball (MLB). The San Diego Padres selected Brash out of Niagara University in the fourth round of the 2019 MLB draft. He was traded to Seattle the next year. He made his MLB debut in 2022 as a starting pitcher, converting to a relief role that season. He led the American League in games pitched in 2023.

Brash pitched for Canada in the 2023 World Baseball Classic.

== Amateur career ==
Brash attended Bayridge Secondary School in Kingston, Ontario, where he led the baseball team to two championships. He also played for Ontario in the 2015 Canada Cup. He was not drafted out of high school and attended Niagara University in Lewiston, New York to play college baseball for the Purple Eagles. In three seasons at Niagara, he was 12–7 with a 2.97 ERA in 38 games, 27 of them starts. He was named the Metro Atlantic Athletic Conference Rookie of the Year in 2017, after his freshman season.

== Professional career ==
=== San Diego Padres ===
Brash was drafted by the San Diego Padres in the fourth round of the 2019 Major League Baseball draft. He had pitched for the Padres at Petco Park prior to the draft. He received a $512,400 signing bonus when he signed with the Padres.

Brash made his professional debut in 2019, pitching one game for the Arizona League Padres, then moving up to the Single-A Fort Wayne TinCaps for four more games before ending his season on July 7, traveling back to the Padres' Arizona facility and resting his pitching arm. He had a combined 1.69 ERA and eight strikeouts in 5 1/3 innings. Brash did not play in 2020 because the Minor League Baseball was canceled due to the COVID-19 pandemic.

=== Seattle Mariners ===
On September 17, 2020, the Padres traded Brash to the Seattle Mariners as the player to be named later for in a previous trade sending reliever Taylor Williams to the Padres. Brash began the 2021 season with the High-A Everett AquaSox and was promoted to the Double-A Arkansas Travelers in July. On September 2, Brash threw six perfect innings to start a combined no-hitter, finished by relievers Nate Fisher and Dayeison Arias. That capped a stretch of three consecutive starts with at least 10 strikeouts. For the season, Brash went a combined 6–4 with a 2.31 ERA and 142 strikeouts over 97 1/3 innings in 19 starts and one relief appearance. On September 28, Seattle selected Brash's contract to the 40-man roster and promoted him to the major leagues for the first time, although he did not make an appearance. He won the Wayne Norton Award, given to the best Canadian minor league pitcher, and was named the best Mariners minor league pitcher.

On April 2, 2022, the Mariners announced Brash would be the team's fifth starter in its starting rotation. He made his MLB debut on April 12, striking out six in 5 1/3 innings and allowing the only run in a 1–0 loss to the Chicago White Sox. After five starts with a 7.65 ERA and 17 walks in 20 innings, the Mariners optioned Brash down to the Triple-A Tacoma Rainiers. In the minors, Brash converted to a reliever and lowered his walk rate moderately, pitching in 26 games and earning three saves.

The Mariners recalled Brash on July 9, and he became a setup man for the team, earning 9 holds and a 3–1 record in the final three months of the season. Brash was the winning pitcher on September 30 when the Mariners clinched their first postseason appearance since 2001, throwing a scoreless inning against the Oakland Athletics before Cal Raleigh's pinch-hit game-winning home run. Brash pitched three times in the postseason, getting 4 strikeouts in 3 1/3 perfect innings.

Brash started 2023 slowly, blowing three saves and picking up two losses in his first 11 games. His performance improved, with only two blown saves and two losses the rest of the season. He earned his first MLB save on April 30, pitching a scoreless 10th inning against the Blue Jays. He led the American League (AL) with 78 games pitched. He had a 9—4 record with 4 saves and a 3.06 ERA, getting 107 strikeouts in 70 2/3 innings.

Brash did not pitch for the Mariners in 2024. He began the season on the injured list with right elbow inflammation and underwent Tommy John surgery on May 8, ending his season and delaying the start of his 2025 season. He returned to the majors on May 3, 2025. On August 13, he gave up a walk-off double to Jackson Holliday of the Baltimore Orioles. On September 17, he allowed four runs in 2/3 of an inning to help snap the Mariners' 10-game winning streak. He finished the regular season with a 1–3 record, four saves, and 2.47 ERA in 53 games.

In his return to the postseason, Brash blew a save in Game 2 of the AL Division Series, allowing two runs in the eighth inning, then earned the win when his offense scored in the bottom of the eighth. He had three other scoreless appearances in the Division Series, then three perfect outings to start the AL Championship Series. He allowed a run after throwing a wild pitch in a Game 6 Mariners loss.

Brash pitched in 20 games for Seattle in 2026, logging a 3–0 record and 0.54 ERA with 15 strikeouts across 16 2/3 innings pitched. He missed three weeks in May with inflammation in a right lat muscle. On June 10, Brash was placed on the injured list due to a right lat strain. He was transferred to the 60-day injured list on August 21. On September 4, Brash was shut down for the rest of the season due to inflammation in his injured muscle.

== International career ==
Brash is on the roster for the Canada national baseball team. He pitched once in the 2023 World Baseball Classic, striking out all three Great Britain batters he faced to finish an 18–8 win.
