= Josh Rojas =

American baseball player (born 1994)

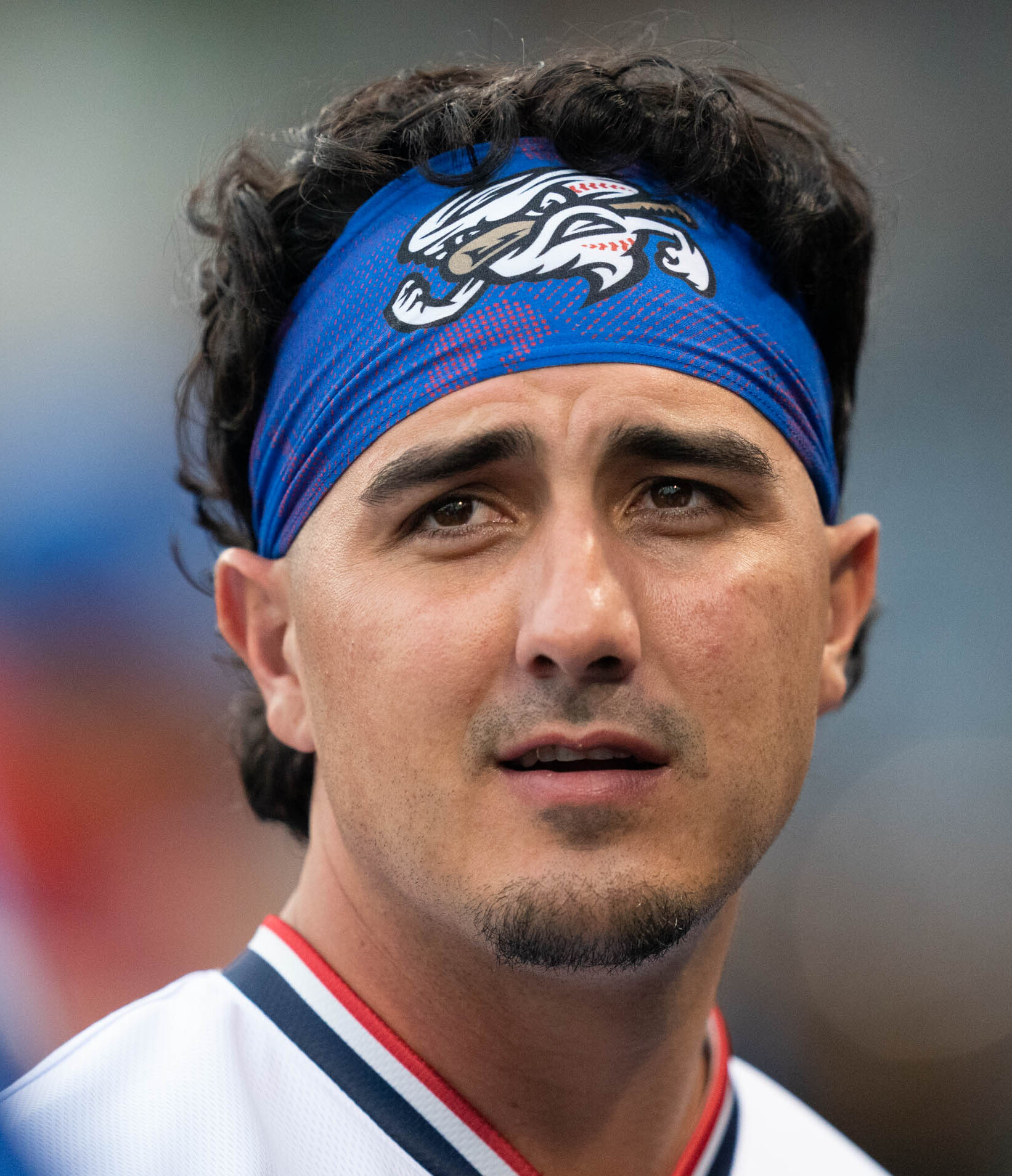
- Rojas with the Omaha Storm Chasers in 2026

Free agent
- Utility player
- Born: June 30, 1994 (age 32); Litchfield Park, Arizona, U.S.
- Bats: Left Throws: Right

MLB debut
- August 12, 2019, for the Arizona Diamondbacks

MLB statistics (through 2026 season)
- Batting average: .240
- Home runs: 38
- Runs batted in: 214
- Stats at Baseball Reference

Teams
- Arizona Diamondbacks (2019–2023); Seattle Mariners (2023–2024); Chicago White Sox (2025); Kansas City Royals (2026)

Joshua Luke Rojas (born June 30, 1994) is an American professional baseball utility player who is a free agent. He has played in Major League Baseball (MLB) for the Arizona Diamondbacks, Seattle Mariners, Chicago White Sox, and Kansas City Royals.

== Amateur career ==
Rojas attended Millennium High School in Goodyear, Arizona and played college baseball first at Paradise Valley Community College before transferring to the University of Hawaii for his final two years of college. In 2015, he played collegiate summer baseball with the Cotuit Kettleers of the Cape Cod Baseball League. In 2017, his senior year at Hawaii, he hit .294 with five home runs and 25 RBIs in 50 games.

== Professional career ==
=== Houston Astros ===
Rojas was drafted by the Houston Astros in the 26th round of the 2017 Major League Baseball draft. He received a $1,000 signing bonus.

Rojas made his professional debut in 2017 with the Quad Cities River Bandits and also played in four games for the Fresno Grizzlies. In 56 professional games in 2017, he hit .261 with 10 home runs and 40 RBIs. He began 2018 with the Buies Creek Astros and, after one month, was promoted to the Corpus Christi Hooks, where he earned Texas League All-Star honors. In 130 total games between both teams, he slashed .263/.351/.408 with eight home runs, 55 RBIs, and 38 stolen bases. He started 2019 back in Corpus Christi before being promoted to the Round Rock Express at the end of May.

=== Arizona Diamondbacks ===
On July 31, 2019, the Astros traded Rojas and fellow prospects Corbin Martin, Seth Beer, and J. B. Bukauskas to the Arizona Diamondbacks in exchange for starter Zack Greinke and cash considerations.

On August 12, 2019, the Diamondbacks selected Rojas' contract and promoted him to the major leagues. He made his major league debut that night against the Colorado Rockies, hitting two singles and tallying his first major league run and RBI. He played primarily in the outfield in his first season, putting up a .217 average with 2 home runs in 41 games. In 2020, Rojas slashed .180/.257/.180 in 17 games before ending the season on the injured list with a lower back injury. Rojas improved in 2021, slashing .264/.341/.411 across 139 games while serving in a utility role for the Diamondbacks. He was Arizona's leadoff hitter in 71 games, a career high. In 2022, he played primarily third base with some action at second base and repeated his offensive production, batting .269/.349/.391 in 125 games. In the first four months of 2023, his offense dipped with the Diamondbacks, with a .228 average and no home runs in 59 games.

=== Seattle Mariners ===
On July 31, 2023, the Diamondbacks traded Rojas, Dominic Canzone, and Ryan Bliss to the Seattle Mariners for closer Paul Sewald. Rojas played second base for the Mariners for the rest of the season, batting .272 with 4 home runs in 46 games to close out 2023.

Rojas went back across the diamond to third base in 2024, as former teammate Eugenio Suárez was dealt to his former club, the Diamondbacks. Rojas was hot the first month of the season, batting .318 with 5 home runs at the end of April. He fared worse thereafter, batting .205 with only 5 more home runs. For the season, he hit .225/.304/.337. The Mariners mostly shielded him from left-handed pitchers, as he hit .125 in just 60 at bats without the platoon advantage. On November 22, Rojas was non-tendered by the Mariners, making him a free agent for the first time in his career.

=== Chicago White Sox ===
On January 8, 2025, Rojas signed a one-year, $3.5 million contract with the Chicago White Sox. In 69 games for Chicago, he batted .180/.252/.259 with two home runs, 11 RBI, and four stolen bases. He was designated for assignment by the White Sox on August 22. He was released by Chicago after clearing waivers the following day.

=== Kansas City Royals ===
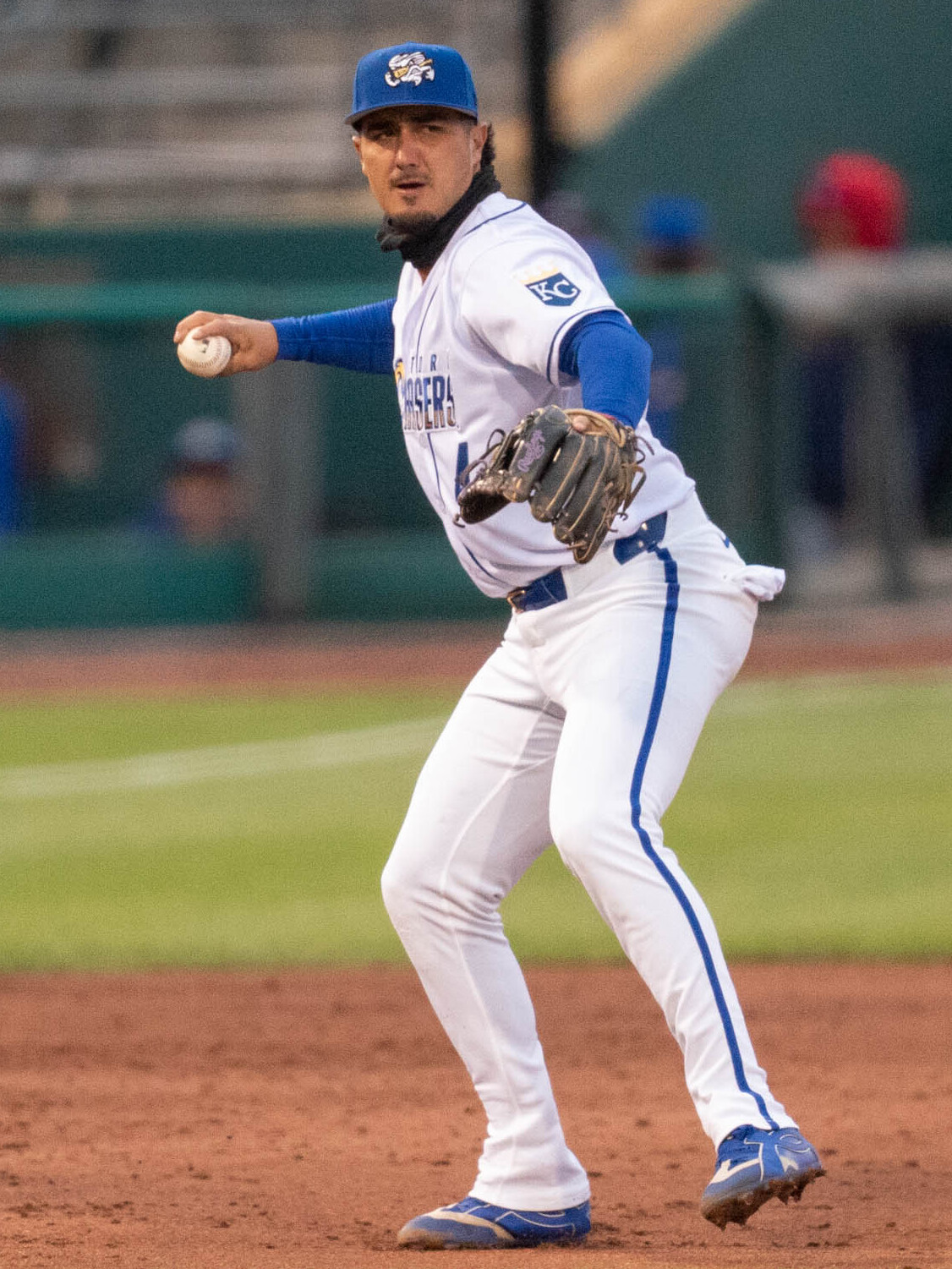
Rojas with the Omaha Storm Chasers in 2026

On January 7, 2026, Rojas signed a minor league contract with the Kansas City Royals. He began the season with the Triple-A Omaha Storm Chasers, where he batted .246/.309/.433 with six home runs, 26 RBI, and two stolen bases across his first 48 appearances. On June 4, the Royals selected Rojas' contract, adding him to their active roster. He had been notified of his promotion mid-game during the Storm Chasers' away matchup with the Toledo Mud Hens. Flying to Minneapolis for the game that was then in a rain delay, Rojas pinch-hit in the 9th inning of the restarted game, driving in the go-ahead runs.

== Personal life ==
Rojas and his wife were married on July 11, 2023. Their first child was born on January 5, 2024.
