= Penn Murfee =

American baseball player (born 1994)

Free agent
- Pitcher
- Born: May 2, 1994 (age 32); Nashville, Tennessee, U.S.
- Bats: Right Throws: Right

MLB debut
- April 29, 2022, for the Seattle Mariners

MLB statistics (through 2025 season)
- Win–loss record: 5–3
- Earned run average: 3.38
- Strikeouts: 105
- Stats at Baseball Reference

Teams
- Seattle Mariners (2022–2023); Chicago White Sox (2025)

William Penn Murfee (born May 2, 1994) is an American professional baseball pitcher who is a free agent. He has previously played in Major League Baseball (MLB) for the Seattle Mariners and Chicago White Sox.

== Career ==
=== Amateur career ===
Murfee attended Montgomery Bell Academy in Nashville, Tennessee. Undrafted out of high school in 2013, Murfree attended Vanderbilt University. Murfee redshirted his freshman season, and played college baseball for the Commodores for three seasons. Murfee was an infielder his first two seasons, before converting to pitching for his final year at Vanderbilt. Murfee transferred to Santa Clara University for his redshirt senior season.

=== Seattle Mariners ===
Murfee was drafted by the Seattle Mariners in the 33rd round, with the 988th overall selection, of the 2018 Major League baseball (MLB) draft.

He spent the 2018 season with the Everett AquaSox, going 3–2 with a 6.55 ERA over 33 innings. In 2019, he split between the Modesto Nuts, Arkansas Travelers, and Tacoma Rainiers, going a combined 6–5 with a 3.57 ERA and 136 strikeouts over 113 1/3 innings. Murfee received the Mariners 2019 minor league "60 ft., 6-in Club” Award.

After the season, he played for the Peoria Javelinas of the Arizona Fall League. And also, on October 10, 2019, he was selected for the United States national baseball team at the 2019 WBSC Premier 12. Murfee did not play in a game in 2020 due to the cancellation of the minor league season because of the COVID-19 pandemic. In 2021, he split the season between Double-A Arkansas and Triple-A Tacoma, posting a 7-3 record and 4.23 ERA with 97 strikeouts in 78.2 innings pitched across 26 appearances (14 starts). He was assigned to Tacoma to begin the 2022 season.

On April 20, 2022, Murfee was added to the Mariners active roster. Murfee was unused out of the Mariners bullpen in the six days he spent on the active roster, and was removed from the 40-man roster and returned to Triple-A on April 27. Due to his time spent on Seattle’s active roster, but no major league playing time, Murfee became a phantom ballplayer. The following day, Murfee was re-selected to the 40-man and active rosters. He made his MLB debut on April 29, 2022, pitching against the Miami Marlins and recording his first two strikeouts. He made 64 appearances for Seattle in his rookie campaign, pitching to a 4-0 record and 2.99 ERA with 76 strikeouts in 69.1 innings of work.

Murfee pitched in 16 contests for Seattle in 2023, registering a 1.29 ERA with 16 strikeouts across 14.0 innings of work. On June 27, 2023, it was announced that Murfee would undergo season–ending surgery on his ulnar collateral ligament.

=== Houston Astros ===
On October 31, 2023, Murfee was claimed off waivers by the New York Mets. On November 14, Murfee was once again claimed off waivers, this time by the Atlanta Braves. The Braves non-tendered him on November 17, and he re-signed with Atlanta on November 30. He was then placed on release waivers by the Braves on March 25, 2024 On March 27, Murfee was claimed off waivers by the Houston Astros. The next day, the team placed him on the 15–day injured list, moving him to the 60–day injured list on April 4. Murfee made one rehab appearance for the Single–A Fayetteville Woodpeckers but was shut down after experiencing elbow discomfort.

=== Chicago White Sox ===
On November 4, 2024, Murfee was claimed off waivers by the Chicago White Sox. In 15 appearances for the White Sox, he struggled to an 0-1 record and 7.82 ERA with 13 strikeouts across 12 2/3 innings pitched. On May 6, 2025, Murfee was removed from the 40-man roster and sent outright to the Triple-A Charlotte Knights. In 22 appearances for Charlotte, he logged a 2-1 record and 4.09 ERA with 16 strikeouts and one save over 22 innings of work. Murfee was released by the White Sox organization on August 1.
