= Ryan Bliss =

American baseball player (born 1999)

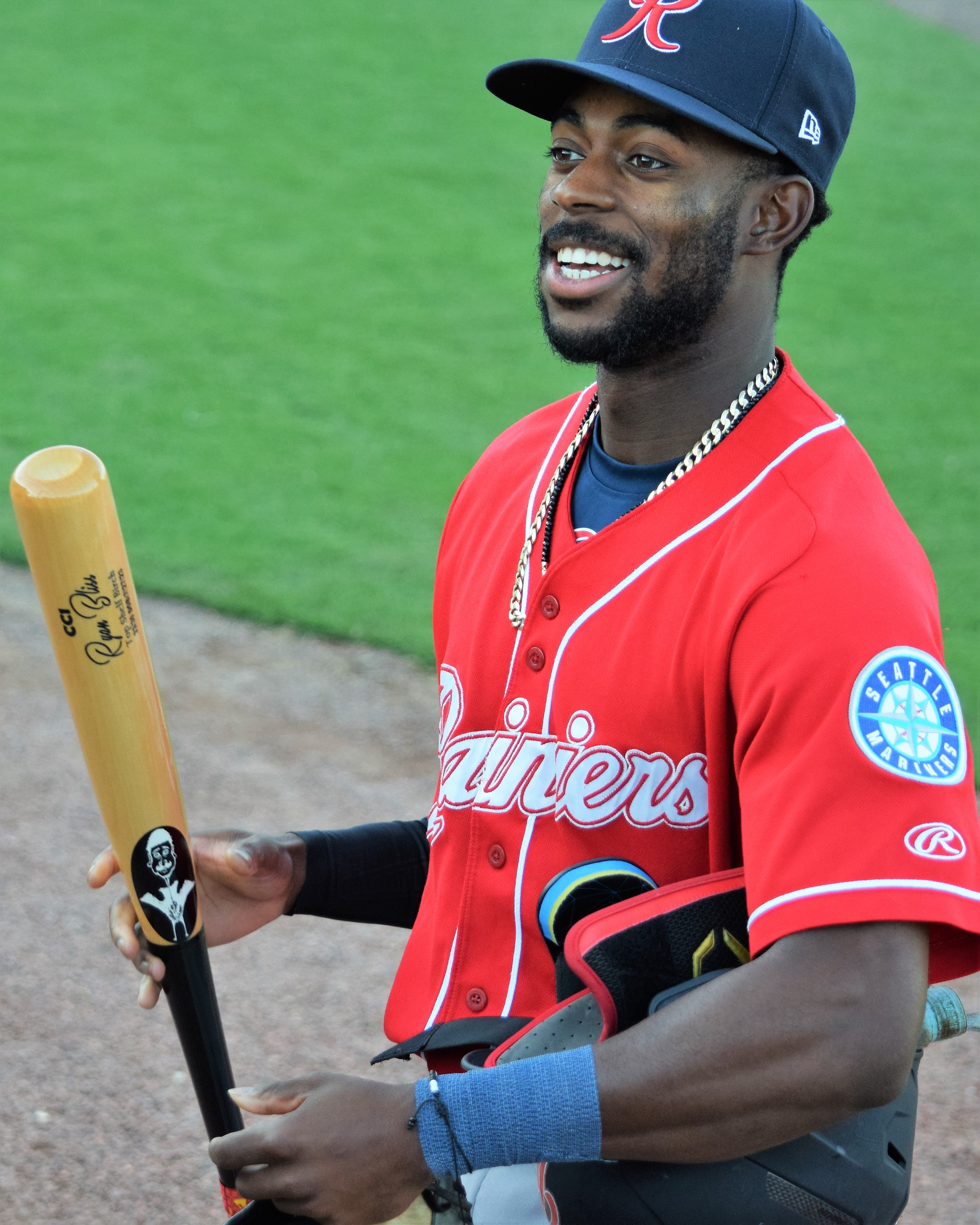
- Bliss with the Tacoma Rainiers in 2023

Seattle Mariners – No. 1
- Second baseman
- Born: December 13, 1999 (age 26); Burbank, California, U.S.
- Bats: Right Throws: Right

MLB debut
- May 27, 2024, for the Seattle Mariners

MLB statistics (through 2026 season)
- Batting average: .208
- Home runs: 3
- Runs batted in: 13
- Stats at Baseball Reference

Teams
- Seattle Mariners (2024–present)

Ryan Isiah Bliss (born December 13, 1999) is an American professional baseball second baseman for the Seattle Mariners of Major League Baseball (MLB). He played college baseball for the Auburn Tigers. He made his MLB debut in 2024.

== Amateur career ==
Bliss grew up in LaGrange, Georgia, and attended Troup County High School. He hit eight home runs and was named an All-American by Rawlings-Perfect Game as a senior. Bliss was selected in the 30th round of the 2018 Major League Baseball draft by the Boston Red Sox but did not sign with the team.

Bliss attended Auburn University and played college baseball for the Auburn Tigers for three seasons. He became the team's starting shortstop as a freshman and was named to the Southeastern Conference (SEC) All-Freshman team after batting .281 with 50 runs scored. In 2019, he played collegiate summer baseball with the Brewster Whitecaps of the Cape Cod Baseball League. As a sophomore, he batted for a .377 average with a team-high 21 runs scored in 18 games before the season was cut short due to the coronavirus pandemic. In his junior season, Bliss was named an All-American by the National Collegiate Baseball Writers Association after batting .365 with 15 home runs, 14 doubles, and 45 RBIs.

== Professional career ==
=== Arizona Diamondbacks ===
The Arizona Diamondbacks selected Bliss in the second round, with the 42nd overall pick, in the 2021 Major League Baseball draft. He signed on July 18, receiving a $1.25 million bonus. He made his professional debut with the Rookie-level Arizona Complex League Diamondbacks and was promoted to the Visalia Rawhide of the Low-A West after two games. He hit for the cycle with Visalia on September 17. Over 39 games in the minors in 2021, he batted .267 with six home runs, 24 RBI, and 13 stolen bases.

Bliss spent the 2022 campaign with the High-A Hillsboro Hops, playing in 110 games and batting .214/.298/.343 with 10 home runs, 37 RBI, and 31 stolen bases. He began the 2023 season with the Double-A Amarillo Sod Poodles, hitting .358/.414/.594 with 12 home runs, 47 RBI, and 30 stolen bases in 68 games. Bliss was promoted to the Triple-A Reno Aces in July, where he slashed .196/.274/.357 with one home run, four RBI, and five stolen bases in 13 games.

=== Seattle Mariners ===
On July 31, 2023, the Diamondbacks traded Bliss, Dominic Canzone, and Josh Rojas to the Seattle Mariners for reliever Paul Sewald. Bliss finished 2023 with the Triple-A Tacoma Rainiers, batting .251 with 10 home runs in 47 games. He stole 58 bases in the minors in 2023. He played for the Peoria Javelinas in the Arizona Fall League, batting .239 with 14 walks in 21 games.

Bliss began the 2024 season in Tacoma, hitting .247/.382/.445 with seven home runs, 35 RBI, and 28 stolen bases. On May 27, Bliss was selected to the Mariners' 40-man roster and promoted to the major leagues for the first time. Bliss made his MLB debut the same day. He earned his first hit on June 1, a single off Carson Fulmer of the Los Angeles Angels. He hit his first home run on June 7, off Daniel Lynch of the Kansas City Royals. Bliss was optioned back to Tacoma on July 22 and briefly returned to the Mariners from August 7 to August 11. He ended his first MLB season with a .222 batting average, 2 home runs, and five stolen bases in 33 games. He played 93 games for Tacoma, swiping 50 bases and hitting .269 with 12 home runs.

Bliss was the Mariners' 2025 Opening Day second baseman. On April 8, he injured his arm swinging at a Framber Valdez pitch. While Bliss stayed in the game, later hitting a double, the next day the Mariners placed him on the 10-day injured list with a left biceps tear. The team disclosed that he would miss four to five months due to the injury. He was moved to the 60-day injured list on April 13. On September 8, it was announced that Bliss had undergone season-ending surgery to repair a meniscus tear in his right knee. In 11 games with the Mariners, Bliss batted .200/.282/.314 with 1 home run. He stole two bases and was caught stealing twice.
