= 2023 Toronto Blue Jays season =

Major League Baseball season

2023 Toronto Blue Jays
- American League Wild Card
- League: American League
- Division: East
- Ballpark: Rogers Centre
- City: Toronto, Ontario
- Record: 89–73 (.549)
- Divisional place: 3rd
- Owners: Rogers, CEO Mark Shapiro
- General manager: Ross Atkins
- Manager: John Schneider
- Television: Sportsnet; Sportsnet One (Dan Shulman, Buck Martinez)
- Radio: Blue Jays Radio Network; Sportsnet 590 the FAN

The 2023 Toronto Blue Jays season was the franchise's 47th season in Major League Baseball, and 32nd full season (34th overall) at Rogers Centre. They started the season on the road against the St. Louis Cardinals on March 30, and finished the season at home against the Tampa Bay Rays on October 1. The Toronto Blue Jays drew an average home attendance of 37,307 in 81 home games in the 2023 MLB season.

The schedule was revised de-emphasizing divisional play by shifting over twenty games to interleague play. Toronto played each divisional opponent in four series, two home and two away, down from six. Those eight series were added to the interleague schedule where the Blue Jays played each National League team once except for the Philadelphia Phillies, which they played both home and away.

With their victory over the Colorado Rockies on September 1, the Blue Jays became the first team in MLB history to beat every opposing team at least once in a single season.

The Blue Jays clinched a playoff spot in the 2023 postseason on September 30, when the visiting Texas Rangers defeated the Seattle Mariners. The Blue Jays returned to the postseason for the second consecutive season and the third in four years, missing the 2021 postseason by one game. They lost in two games in the American League Wild Card Series to the Minnesota Twins at Target Field.

== Previous season ==
The 2022 Blue Jays finished 2nd in the AL East, to the New York Yankees, with a record of 92–70 (.556). They qualified for the postseason, but lost in two games in the American League Wild Card Series to the Seattle Mariners in a two-game sweep.

== Offseason ==
=== Departing free agents ===
- On November 6, 2022: RHP David Phelps & RHP Ross Stripling elected free agency
- On November 7, 2022: OF Jackie Bradley Jr. elected free agency
- On November 10, 2022: LHP Trey Cumbie, RHP José De León, RHP Jake Elliott, C Ryan Gold, RHP Casey Lawrence, RHP Brady Lail, RHP Elvis Luciano, INF Eric Stamets, OF Yoshi Tsutsugo & RHP Eric Yardley elected free agency
- On November 15, 2022: LHP Foster Griffin was released
- On November 18, 2022: INF Vinny Capra, OF Raimel Tapia & OF Bradley Zimmer elected free agency
- On February 6, 2023: LHP Matt Gage was released

=== Trades ===
- On November 16, 2022: Acquired RHP Erik Swanson and LHP prospect Adam Macko from the Seattle Mariners in exchange for OF Teoscar Hernández
- On December 23, 2022: Acquired OF Daulton Varsho from the Arizona Diamondbacks in exchange for OF Lourdes Gurriel Jr. and C Gabriel Moreno
- On January 10, 2023: Acquired RHP Zach Thompson from the Pittsburgh Pirates in exchange for OF Chavez Young

=== Waiver transactions ===
- On November 9, 2022: LHP Tayler Saucedo claimed off waivers by the New York Mets
- On December 23, 2022: RHP Anthony Kay claimed off waivers by the Chicago Cubs
- On January 5, 2023: RHP Junior Fernández claimed off waivers from the New York Yankees
- On January 17, 2023: RHP Julian Merryweather claimed off waivers by the Chicago Cubs
- On February 13, 2023: LHP Matt Gage claimed off release waivers by the Houston Astros

=== Free agent signings ===
- On November 19, 2022: Signed INF Vinny Capra to a minor league contract
- On December 15, 2022: Signed OF Kevin Kiermaier to a one-year, $9 million deal
- On December 16, 2022: Signed RHP Chris Bassitt to a three-year, $63 million deal
- On December 30, 2022: Signed RHP Casey Lawrence to a minor league contract
- On January 6, 2023: Signed C Rob Brantly, RHP Julian Fernández, LHP Paul Fry & RHP Drew Hutchison to minor league contracts.
- On January 10, 2023: Signed INF Brandon Belt to a one-year, $9.3 million deal Signed RHP Nathan Witt to a minor league contract.
- On January 15, 2023: Signed RHP Samuel Acuna, LHP Andersson Barvosa, OF Emmanuel Bonilla, RHP Samuel Colmenares, C Ivan Gomez, LHP Eduar Gonzalez, OF David Guzman, INF Adrian Meza, INF Jarold Montealto, RHP Sann Omasako, OF Daniel Perez & C Juan Rosas as international free agents, to minor league contracts.
- On January 20, 2023: Signed OF Wynton Bernard to a minor league contract.
- On January 23, 2023: Signed OF Cawrin Salcedo to a minor league contract.
- On January 30, 2023: Signed RHP Chad Green to a two-year, $8.5 million deal.
- On January 31, 2023: Signed C Jamie Ritchie to a minor league contract.
- On February 11, 2023: Signed RHP Luke Bard to a minor league contract.

=== Coaching changes ===
- On November 30, 2022: Don Mattingly joined the Toronto Blue Jays as Bench Coach.
- On January 15, 2023: Bullpen Coach Matt Buschmann resigns from the Toronto Blue Jays.
- On January 31, 2023: David Howell and Jeff Ware joined the Toronto Blue Jays as Pitching Strategist and Bullpen Coach respectively.

== Standings ==
=== American League East ===
AL East
Team	W	L	Pct.	GB	Home	Road
Baltimore Orioles	101	61	.623	—	49‍–‍32	52‍–‍29
Tampa Bay Rays	99	63	.611	2	53‍–‍28	46‍–‍35
Toronto Blue Jays	89	73	.549	12	43‍–‍38	46‍–‍35
New York Yankees	82	80	.506	19	42‍–‍39	40‍–‍41
Boston Red Sox	78	84	.481	23	39‍–‍42	39‍–‍42

=== American League Wild Card ===
Division leaders
Team	W	L	Pct.
Baltimore Orioles	101	61	.623
Houston Astros	90	72	.556
Minnesota Twins	87	75	.537

Wild Card teams (Top 3 teams qualify for postseason)
Team	W	L	Pct.	GB
Tampa Bay Rays	99	63	.611	+10
Texas Rangers	90	72	.556	+1
Toronto Blue Jays	89	73	.549	—
Seattle Mariners	88	74	.543	1
New York Yankees	82	80	.506	7
Boston Red Sox	78	84	.481	11
Detroit Tigers	78	84	.481	11
Cleveland Guardians	76	86	.469	13
Los Angeles Angels	73	89	.451	16
Chicago White Sox	61	101	.377	28
Kansas City Royals	56	106	.346	33
Oakland Athletics	50	112	.309	39

== Records vs opponents ==
	Record			Games Left		
Opponent	Home	Road	Total	Home	Road	Total
AL East
Baltimore Orioles	1–6	2–4	3–10	–	–	–
Boston Red Sox	3–3	3–4	6–7	–	–	–
New York Yankees	2–5	4–2	6–7	–	–	–
Tampa Bay Rays	3–3	3–4	6–7	–	–	–
Totals	9–17	12–14	21–31	–	–	–
AL Central
Chicago White Sox	3–0	3–0	6–0	–	–	–
Cleveland Guardians	1–2	2–2	3–4	–	–	–
Detroit Tigers	2–1	2–1	4–2	–	–	–
Kansas City Royals	3–0	3–1	6–1	–	–	–
Minnesota Twins	1–2	2–1	3–3	–	–	–
Totals	10–5	12–5	22–10	–	–	–
AL West
Houston Astros	3–1	1–2	4–3	–	–	–
Los Angeles Angels	2–1	2–1	4–2	–	–	–
Oakland Athletics	2–1	2–1	4–2	–	–	–
Seattle Mariners	2–1	1–2	3–3	–	–	–
Texas Rangers	0–4	1–2	1–6	–	–	–
Totals	9–8	7–8	16–16	–	–	–
National League
Arizona Diamondbacks	3–0	–	3–0	–	–	–
Atlanta Braves	3–0	–	3–0	–	–	–
Chicago Cubs	1–2	–	1–2	–	–	–
Cincinnati Reds	–	2–1	2–1	–	–	–
Colorado Rockies	–	2–1	2–1	–	–	–
Los Angeles Dodgers	–	2–1	2–1	–	–	–
Miami Marlins	–	2–1	2–1	–	–	–
Milwaukee Brewers	2–1	–	2–1	–	–	–
New York Mets	–	3–0	3–0	–	–	–
Philadelphia Phillies	1–1	0–2	1–3	–	–	–
Pittsburgh Pirates	–	3–0	3–0	–	–	–
San Diego Padres	1–2	–	1–2	–	–	–
San Francisco Giants	2–1	–	2–1	–	–	–
St. Louis Cardinals	–	1–2	1–2	–	–	–
Washington Nationals	2–1	–	2–1	–	–	–
Totals	15–8	15–8	30–16	–	–	–
Grand Totals	43–38	46–35	89–73	–	–	–

Month	Games	Won	Lost	Pct.
March	1	1	0	1.000
April	27	17	10	.630
May	28	11	17	.393
June	27	16	11	.593
July	24	14	10	.583
August	27	14	13	.519
September	27	16	11	.593
October	1	0	1	.000
Totals	162	89	73	.549

== 2023 draft ==
The 2023 Major League Baseball draft began on July 9 and concluded on July 11. The Blue Jays forfeited their second round selection by signing Chris Bassitt in the offseason.

Round	Pick	Player	Position	College/School	Nationality	Signed
1	20	Arjun Nimmala	SS	Strawberry Crest High School (FL)	(United States)	July 17
3	89	Juaron Watts-Brown	RHP	Oklahoma State	(United States)	July 21
4	121	Landen Maroudis	RHP	Calvary Christian Academy (FL)	(United States)	July 17
5	157	Connor O'Halloran	LHP	Michigan	(Canada)	July 18
6	184	Jace Bohrofen	OF	Arkansas	(United States)	July 18
7	214	Nick Goodwin	SS	Kansas State	(United States)	July 17
8	244	Braden Barry	OF	West Virginia	(United States)	July 18
9	274	Sam Shaw	OF	Lambrick Park Secondary School (BC)	(Canada)	July 16
10	304	Josh Mollerus	RHP	Oregon	(United States)	July 19

== Regular season ==
=== Opening Day ===
Opening Day starters
Position	Name
Catcher	Alejandro Kirk
First baseman	Vladimir Guerrero Jr.
Second baseman	Whit Merrifield
Shortstop	Bo Bichette
Third baseman	Matt Chapman
Left fielder	Daulton Varsho
Center fielder	Kevin Kiermaier
Right fielder	George Springer
Designated hitter	Brandon Belt
Pitcher	Alek Manoah

=== Game log ===
Legend
Blue Jays win	Blue Jays loss	Game postponed	Clinched playoff spot

2023 Game Log: 89–73 (Home: 43–38; Road: 46–35)
March: 1–0 (Home: 0–0; Road: 1–0)

#	Date	Opponent	Score	Win	Loss	Save	Attendance	Record	GB
1	March 30	@ Cardinals	10–9	García (1–0)	Helsley (0–1)	Romano (1)	47,649	1–0	—

April: 17–10 (Home: 9–3; Road: 8–7)

#	Date	Opponent	Score	Win	Loss	Save	Attendance	Record	GB
2	April 1	@ Cardinals	1–4	Flaherty (1–0)	Gausman (0–1)	Helsley (1)	44,461	1–1	1
3	April 2	@ Cardinals	4–9	Montgomery (1–0)	Bassitt (0–1)	—	45,525	1–2	2
4	April 3	@ Royals	5–9	Singer (1–0)	Berríos (0–1)	—	10,810	1–3	3
5	April 4	@ Royals	4–1	Kikuchi (1–0)	Bubic (0–1)	Romano (2)	12,123	2–3	3
6	April 5	@ Royals	3–0	Manoah (1–0)	Greinke (0–2)	Romano (3)	10,015	3–3	3
7	April 6	@ Royals	6–3	Gausman (1–1)	Lyles (0–2)	Cimber (1)	10,401	4–3	2½
8	April 7	@ Angels	4–3	Bassitt (1–1)	Herget (0–1)	Romano (4)	44,735	5–3	2½
9	April 8	@ Angels	5–9	Barría (1–0)	Berríos (0–2)	—	44,534	5–4	3½
10	April 9	@ Angels	12–11 (10)	Romano (1–0)	Estévez (0–1)	Mayza (1)	31,092	6–4	3½
11	April 11	Tigers	9–3	Pop (1–0)	Manning (1–1)	—	42,053	7–4	4
12	April 12	Tigers	4–3 (10)	Romano (2–0)	Shreve (0–1)	—	35,300	8–4	4
13	April 13	Tigers	1–3	Turnbull (1–2)	Bassitt (1–2)	Lange (1)	26,192	8–5	5
14	April 14	Rays	6–3	Berríos (1–2)	Rasmussen (2–1)	Romano (5)	34,822	9–5	4
15	April 15	Rays	5–2	Kikuchi (2–0)	Kelley (0–1)	Romano (6)	41,679	10–5	3
16	April 16	Rays	1–8	McClanahan (4–0)	Manoah (1–1)	—	39,179	10–6	4
17	April 17	@ Astros	2–9	Javier (2–0)	Gausman (1–2)	—	30,873	10–7	4
18	April 18	@ Astros	4–2	Bassitt (2–2)	Urquidy (1–1)	Romano (7)	32,602	11–7	4
19	April 19	@ Astros	1–8	García (1–2)	Berríos (1–3)	—	40,545	11–8	5
20	April 21	@ Yankees	6–1	Kikuchi (3–0)	Germán (1–2)	—	39,025	12–8	5
21	April 22	@ Yankees	2–3	Cordero (1–0)	Romano (2–1)	—	43,223	12–9	6
22	April 23	@ Yankees	5–1	Gausman (2–2)	Schmidt (0–2)	—	39,293	13–9	6
23	April 24	White Sox	5–2	Bassitt (3–2)	Lynn (0–3)	Romano (8)	26,293	14–9	6
24	April 25	White Sox	7–0	Berríos (2–3)	Clevinger (2–2)	—	28,917	15–9	5
25	April 26	White Sox	8–0	Kikuchi (4–0)	Kopech (0–3)	—	35,069	16–9	4
26	April 28	Mariners	3–2	Mayza (1–0)	Gott (0–1)	Romano (9)	41,414	17–9	4½
27	April 29	Mariners	1–0 (10)	Swanson (1–0)	Gott (0–2)	—	41,475	18–9	4½
28	April 30	Mariners	8–10 (10)	Sewald (2–0)	Pop (1–1)	Brash (1)	40,158	18–10	4½

May: 11–17 (Home: 5–7; Road: 6–10)

#	Date	Opponent	Score	Win	Loss	Save	Attendance	Record	GB
29	May 1	@ Red Sox	5–6	Winckowski (2–0)	Romano (2–2)	—	27,438	18–11	5
30	May 2	@ Red Sox	6–7	Bleier (1–0)	Swanson (1–1)	Winckowski (1)	27,721	18–12	6
31	May 3	@ Red Sox	3–8	Pivetta (2–2)	Manoah (1–2)	—	27,963	18–13	7
32	May 4	@ Red Sox	5–11	Bello (1–1)	Gausman (2–3)	—	30,173	18–14	8
33	May 5	@ Pirates	4–0	Bassitt (4–2)	Hill (3–3)	—	24,810	19–14	8
34	May 6	@ Pirates	8–2	Berríos (3–3)	Oviedo (2–3)	—	34,882	20–14	7
35	May 7	@ Pirates	10–1	Kikuchi (5–0)	Contreras (3–3)	—	21,655	21–14	7
36	May 9	@ Phillies	4–8	Nola (3–2)	Manoah (1–3)	—	44,544	21–15	7½
37	May 10	@ Phillies	1–2 (10)	Kimbrel (2–1)	Mayza (1–1)	—	31,758	21–16	7½
38	May 12	Braves	3–0	Bassitt (5–2)	Strider (4–1)	—	35,047	22–16	7
39	May 13	Braves	5–2	Swanson (2–1)	Minter (2–5)	Romano (10)	41,341	23–16	6
40	May 14	Braves	6–5	Pearson (1–0)	Iglesias (0–1)	—	40,895	24–16	6
41	May 15	Yankees	4–7	Brito (3–3)	Manoah (1–4)	King (3)	28,810	24–17	6½
42	May 16	Yankees	3–6	Weber (1–0)	Swanson (2–2)	Peralta (3)	35,112	24–18	7½
43	May 17	Yankees	3–0 (10)	Romano (3–2)	Peralta (2–1)	—	27,431	25–18	6½
44	May 18	Yankees	2–4	Cortés Jr. (4–2)	Berríos (3–4)	Marinaccio (1)	33,290	25–19	6½
45	May 19	Orioles	2–6	Gibson (5–3)	Kikuchi (5–1)	—	32,485	25–20	7½
46	May 20	Orioles	5–6 (10)	Bautista (3–1)	García (1–1)	—	41,611	25–21	8½
47	May 21	Orioles	3–8 (10)	Baumann (3–0)	García (1–2)	—	41,643	25–22	8½
48	May 22	@ Rays	4–6	Fleming (1–0)	Bassitt (5–3)	Fairbanks (5)	8,857	25–23	9½
49	May 23	@ Rays	20–1	Berríos (4–4)	Bradley (3–1)	—	11,906	26–23	8½
50	May 24	@ Rays	3–7	McClanahan (8–0)	Kikuchi (5–2)	—	8,699	26–24	9½
51	May 25	@ Rays	3–6	Eflin (7–1)	Manoah (1–5)	Poche (1)	10,736	26–25	10½
52	May 26	@ Twins	3–1	Gausman (3–3)	Varland (2–1)	Romano (11)	25,061	27–25	10½
53	May 27	@ Twins	7–9	López (3–3)	Bassitt (5–4)	Stewart (1)	29,111	27–26	10½
54	May 28	@ Twins	3–0	Berríos (5–4)	Ober (3–2)	Romano (12)	31,025	28–26	10½
55	May 30	Brewers	7–2	Kikuchi (6–2)	Houser (1–1)	—	32,930	29–26	9
56	May 31	Brewers	2–4	Teherán (1–1)	Manoah (1–6)	Williams (9)	42,205	29–27	10

June: 16–11 (Home: 9–6; Road: 7–5)

#	Date	Opponent	Score	Win	Loss	Save	Attendance	Record	GB
57	June 1	Brewers	3–1	Gausman (4–3)	Peralta (5–5)	Romano (13)	42,059	30–27	9½
58	June 2	@ Mets	3–0	Bassitt (6–4)	Verlander (2–3)	Romano (14)	42,637	31–27	9
59	June 3	@ Mets	2–1	Pearson (2–0)	Robertson (2–1)	Swanson (1)	37,704	32–27	8½
60	June 4	@ Mets	6–4	Pearson (3–0)	Leone (0–2)	Romano (15)	42,169	33–27	8½
61	June 5	Astros	4–11	Bielak (3–2)	Manoah (1–7)	—	23,982	33–28	9½
62	June 6	Astros	5–1	Gausman (5–3)	Brown (5–3)	Richards (1)	30,079	34–28	9½
63	June 7	Astros	3–2	Bassitt (7–4)	Neris (3–2)	Romano (16)	26,724	35–28	9½
64	June 8	Astros	3–2	Berríos (6–4)	Valdez (6–5)	Romano (17)	28,284	36–28	9½
65	June 9	Twins	2–3 (10)	Durán (2–2)	Cimber (0–1)	—	35,222	36–29	10½
66	June 10	Twins	4–9	López (2–2)	Cimber (0–2)	—	41,990	36–30	10½
67	June 11	Twins	7–6	Pearson (4–0)	Pagán (3–1)	Romano (18)	41,673	37–30	10½
68	June 13	@ Orioles	6–11	Kremer (7–3)	Bassitt (7–5)	—	16,018	37–31	10
69	June 14	@ Orioles	3–1	Berríos (7–4)	Bradish (2–3)	Romano (19)	16,083	38–31	10
70	June 15	@ Orioles	2–4	Wells (6–2)	García (1–3)	Bautista (18)	22,555	38–32	11
71	June 16	@ Rangers	2–1	Gausman (6–3)	Pérez (6–3)	Romano (20)	34,308	39–32	11
72	June 17	@ Rangers	2–4	Dunning (6–1)	Richards (0–1)	Smith (12)	39,383	39–33	11
73	June 18	@ Rangers	7–11	King (1–0)	Pearson (4–1)	—	38,515	39–34	11
74	June 19	@ Marlins	0–11	Brazobán (1–1)	Berríos (7–5)	—	12,226	39–35	11½
75	June 20	@ Marlins	2–0	García (2–3)	Scott (4–2)	Romano (21)	9,809	40–35	10½
76	June 21	@ Marlins	6–3	Gausman (7–3)	Alcántara (2–6)	Romano (22)	15,701	41–35	10½
77	June 23	Athletics	4–5	Erceg (2–0)	Romano (3–3)	May (4)	34,988	41–36	11
78	June 24	Athletics	7–3	Berríos (8–5)	Fujinami (3–7)	Romano (23)	41,720	42–36	10
79	June 25	Athletics	12–1	Kikuchi (7–2)	Medina (1–7)	—	41,069	43–36	10
80	June 27	Giants	0–3	Wood (3–2)	Gausman (7–4)	Doval (23)	36,004	43–37	10
81	June 28	Giants	6–1	Francis (1–0)	Webb (7–7)	—	36,685	44–37	10
82	June 29	Giants	2–1	Bassitt (8–5)	Winn (0–1)	Romano (24)	27,761	45–37	10
83	June 30	Red Sox	0–5	Paxton (4–1)	Berríos (8–6)	—	37,218	45–38	11

July: 14–10 (Home: 6–6; Road: 8–4)

#	Date	Opponent	Score	Win	Loss	Save	Attendance	Record	GB
84	July 1	Red Sox	6–7	Crawford (3–4)	Kikuchi (7–3)	Jansen (17)	41,813	45–39	11
85	July 2	Red Sox	4–5	Martin (2–1)	Romano (3–4)	Jacques (1)	41,455	45–40	11
86	July 4	@ White Sox	4–3	Pearson (5–1)	Kelly (1–4)	Romano (25)	32,607	46–40	10
—	July 5	@ White Sox	Postponed (rain); Makeup: July 6						
87	July 6 (1)	@ White Sox	6–2 (11)	Romano (4–4)	Bummer (3–2)	García (1)	see 2nd game	47–40	8½
88	July 6 (2)	@ White Sox	5–4	Jackson (1–0)	Padilla (0–1)	Pearson (1)	20,258	48–40	8
89	July 7	@ Tigers	12–2	Manoah (2–7)	Faedo (1–4)	—	30,029	49–40	7
90	July 8	@ Tigers	0–2	Manning (3–1)	Gausman (7–5)	Lange (13)	30,621	49–41	7
91	July 9	@ Tigers	4–3 (10)	García (3–3)	Cisnero (2–2)	Romano (26)	30,077	50–41	7
92	July 14	Diamondbacks	7–2	Richards (1–1)	Nelson (4–2)	—	38,617	51–41	6½
93	July 15	Diamondbacks	5–2	Bassitt (9–5)	Gallen (11–4)	García (2)	42,328	52–41	7
94	July 16	Diamondbacks	7–5	Jackson (2–0)	Henry (5–2)	Swanson (2)	41,794	53–41	6
95	July 18	Padres	1–9	Musgrove (9–2)	Manoah (2–8)	—	42,680	53–42	5½
96	July 19	Padres	0–2	Darvish (7–6)	Berríos (8–7)	Hader (23)	42,948	53–43	5½
97	July 20	Padres	4–0	Bassitt (10–5)	Snell (6–8)	—	43,196	54–43	5½
98	July 21	@ Mariners	2–3	Sewald (3–0)	Romano (4–5)	—	42,352	54–44	5½
99	July 22	@ Mariners	8–9	Campbell (1–0)	Pearson (5–2)	Topa (2)	44,921	54–45	6½
100	July 23	@ Mariners	4–3	Mayza (2–1)	Woo (1–3)	Romano (27)	42,430	55–45	6½
101	July 24	@ Dodgers	6–3 (11)	Jackson (3–0)	Bickford (2–3)	Romano (28)	47,731	56–45	6½
102	July 25	@ Dodgers	7–8 (10)	Graterol (4–2)	White (0–1)	—	47,069	56–46	6½
103	July 26	@ Dodgers	8–1	Kikuchi (8–3)	Gonsolin (5–4)	—	46,667	57–46	5½
104	July 28	Angels	4–1	Gausman (8–5)	Giolito (6–7)	García (3)	42,106	58–46	5½
105	July 29	Angels	6–1	Cabrera (2–1)	Detmers (2–8)	—	41,997	59–46	4½
106	July 30	Angels	2–3 (10)	Estévez (5–1)	García (3–4)	—	41,810	59–47	5½
107	July 31	Orioles	2–4	Gibson (10–6)	Bassitt (10–6)	Bautista (29)	31,122	59–48	6½

August: 14–13 (Home: 6–8; Road: 8–5)

#	Date	Opponent	Score	Win	Loss	Save	Attendance	Record	GB
108	August 1	Orioles	3–13	Bradish (7–6)	Ryu (0–1)	—	40,691	59–49	7½
109	August 2	Orioles	4–1	Kikuchi (9–3)	Rodriguez (2–3)	Swanson (3)	36,924	60–49	6½
110	August 3	Orioles	1–6	Flaherty (8–6)	Gausman (8–6)	—	42,672	60–50	7½
111	August 4	@ Red Sox	7–3	Manoah (3–8)	Paxton (6–3)	Hicks (9)	36,376	61–50	7½
112	August 5	@ Red Sox	5–4	Berríos (9–7)	Bernardino (1–1)	Swanson (4)	36,732	62–50	7½
113	August 6	@ Red Sox	13–1	Bassitt (11–6)	Murphy (1–1)	—	36,162	63–50	7½
114	August 7	@ Guardians	3–1	Swanson (3–2)	De Los Santos (4–2)	Hicks (10)	18,198	64–50	7
115	August 8	@ Guardians	0–1	Bibee (8–2)	Kikuchi (9–4)	Clase (30)	19,467	64–51	7
116	August 9	@ Guardians	1–0	Gausman (9–6)	Allen (5–5)	Hicks (11)	21,227	65–51	6
117	August 10	@ Guardians	3–4	Syndergaard (2–5)	Manoah (3–9)	Clase (31)	23,905	65–52	7
118	August 11	Cubs	2–6	Assad (2–2)	Berríos (9–8)	—	41,814	65–53	7
119	August 12	Cubs	4–5	Merryweather (4–0)	Hicks (1–7)	Alzolay (16)	42,585	65–54	8
120	August 13	Cubs	11–4	Ryu (1–1)	Taillon (7–7)	—	41,960	66–54	8
121	August 15	Phillies	2–1	Hicks (2–7)	Domínguez (2–3)	Romano (29)	42,615	67–54	7½
122	August 16	Phillies	4–9	Nola (10–8)	Gausman (9–7)	—	42,701	67–55	7½
123	August 18	@ Reds	0–1	Díaz (5–4)	Hicks (2–8)	—	28,502	67–56	8½
124	August 19	@ Reds	4–3	Bassitt (12–6)	Williamson (4–3)	Romano (30)	38,461	68–56	8½
125	August 20	@ Reds	10–3	Ryu (2–1)	Greene (2–5)	Francis (1)	31,529	69–56	8½
126	August 22	@ Orioles	6–3 (10)	Mayza (3–1)	Baumann (9–1)	Romano (31)	20,612	70–56	7½
127	August 23	@ Orioles	0–7	Kremer (12–5)	Gausman (9–8)	—	19,132	70–57	8½
128	August 24	@ Orioles	3–5	Gibson (13–7)	Berríos (9–9)	Bautista (33)	19,432	70–58	9½
129	August 25	Guardians	2–5	Bibee (10–3)	Bassitt (12–7)	Clase (34)	40,755	70–59	10½
130	August 26	Guardians	8–3	Ryu (3–1)	Allen (6–7)	—	41,924	71–59	10½
131	August 27	Guardians	7–10 (11)	Clase (2–7)	Jackson (3–1)	—	41,978	71–60	10½
132	August 28	Nationals	6–3	Gausman (10–8)	Gray (7–11)	Hicks (12)	27,940	72–60	10½
133	August 29	Nationals	4–5	Gore (7–10)	Berríos (9–10)	Finnegan (25)	39,722	72–61	11½
134	August 30	Nationals	7–0	Bassitt (13–7)	Corbin (9–12)	—	39,303	73–61	10½

September: 16–11 (Home: 8–7; Road: 8–4)

#	Date	Opponent	Score	Win	Loss	Save	Attendance	Record	GB
135	September 1	@ Rockies	13–9	Cabrera (3–1)	Bird (2–2)	—	27,397	74–61	9½
136	September 2	@ Rockies	7–8	Blach (2–1)	Kikuchi (9–5)	Kinley (1)	40,445	74–62	10½
137	September 3	@ Rockies	7–5	Green (1–0)	Lawrence (4–7)	Romano (32)	32,283	75–62	10½
138	September 4	@ Athletics	6–5 (10)	Romano (5–5)	Pérez (1–2)	—	9,062	76–62	10½
139	September 5	@ Athletics	7–1	Bassitt (14–7)	Neal (1–1)	—	4,751	77–62	10½
140	September 6	@ Athletics	2–5	Sears (4–11)	Ryu (3–2)	May (18)	3,871	77–63	11½
141	September 8	Royals	5–4	Green (2–0)	Hernández (1–10)	Romano (33)	26,493	78–63	11½
142	September 9	Royals	5–1	Gausman (11–8)	Greinke (1–15)	—	41,443	79–63	11½
143	September 10	Royals	5–2	Berríos (10–10)	Clarke (2–5)	Romano (34)	35,275	80–63	10½
144	September 11	Rangers	4–10	Dunning (10–6)	Bassitt (14–8)	—	23,451	80–64	11½
145	September 12	Rangers	3–6	Scherzer (13–6)	Ryu (3–3)	—	30,479	80–65	11½
146	September 13	Rangers	0–10	Montgomery (9–11)	Kikuchi (9–6)	—	25,495	80–66	11½
147	September 14	Rangers	2–9	Bradford (4–1)	Gausman (11–9)	—	37,594	80–67	11½
148	September 15	Red Sox	3–0	Berríos (11–10)	Bello (12–9)	Romano (35)	35,680	81–67	10½
149	September 16	Red Sox	4–3 (13)	Green (3–0)	Llovera (1–3)	—	42,276	82–67	10½
150	September 17	Red Sox	3–2	Swanson (4–2)	Whitlock (5–5)	—	41,876	83–67	10½
151	September 19	@ Yankees	7–1	Kikuchi (10–6)	Schmidt (9–9)	—	38,525	84–67	11
152	September 20	@ Yankees	6–1	Gausman (12–9)	King (4–7)	—	35,587	85–67	10
153	September 21	@ Yankees	3–5	Cole (14–4)	Berríos (11–11)	—	37,646	85–68	10
154	September 22	@ Rays	6–2	Bassitt (15–8)	Glasnow (9–7)	Romano (36)	18,538	86–68	9
155	September 23	@ Rays	6–7	Devenski (5–4)	Romano (5–6)	—	22,655	86–69	10
156	September 24	@ Rays	9–5	Richards (2–1)	Bradley (5–8)	—	22,472	87–69	10
157	September 26	Yankees	0–2	Brito (9–7)	Romano (5–7)	Holmes (23)	40,454	87–70	11
158	September 27	Yankees	0–6	Cole (15–4)	Berríos (11–12)	—	31,923	87–71	12
159	September 28	Yankees	6–0	Bassitt (16–8)	Weaver (3–6)	—	36,657	88–71	12
160	September 29	Rays	11–4	Kikuchi (11–6)	Civale (7–5)	—	42,394	89–71	11
161	September 30	Rays	5–7 (10)	Devenski (6–4)	Hicks (3–9)	—	42,097	89–72	12

October: 0–1 (Home: 0–1; Road: 0–0)

#	Date	Opponent	Score	Win	Loss	Save	Attendance	Record	GB
162	October 1	Rays	8–12	Lopez (1–0)	Parsons (0–1)	—	42,058	89–73	11
* Despite losing to Tampa Bay on September 30, the Blue Jays clinched a playoff berth on this day by virtue of a Seattle loss.

== Postseason ==
=== Postseason game log ===
Legend
Blue Jays win	Blue Jays loss	Game postponed

2023 Postseason Game Log
American League Wild Card Series: 0–2

#	Date	Opponent	Score	Win	Loss	Save	Attendance	Series
1	October 3	@ Twins	1–3	López (1–0)	Gausman (0–1)	Durán (1)	38,450	0–1
2	October 4	@ Twins	0–2	Gray (1–0)	Berríos (0–1)	Durán (2)	38,518	0–2

=== Postseason rosters ===
Playoff rosters
American League Wild Card Series

- Pitchers: 12 Jordan Hicks 16 Yusei Kikuchi 17 José Berríos 33 Trevor Richards 34 Kevin Gausman 37 Chad Green 40 Chris Bassitt 50 Erik Swanson 58 Tim Mayza 68 Jordan Romano 92 Génesis Cabrera 93 Yimi García
- Catchers: 30 Alejandro Kirk 55 Tyler Heineman
- Infielders: 5 Santiago Espinal 8 Cavan Biggio 11 Bo Bichette 15 Whit Merrifield 26 Matt Chapman 27 Vladimir Guerrero Jr. 36 Davis Schneider
- Outfielders: 4 George Springer 25 Daulton Varsho 31 Cam Eden 39 Kevin Kiermaier
- Designated hitters: 13 Brandon Belt

== Roster ==
2023 Toronto Blue Jays
Roster
Pitchers: 52 Anthony Bass; 40 Chris Bassitt; 17 José Berríos; 92 Génesis Cabrera; 90 Adam Cimber; 65 Hagen Danner; 44 Bowden Francis; 93 Yimi García; 34 Kevin Gausman; 37 Chad Green; 31 Thomas Hatch; 12 Jordan Hicks; 35 Jay Jackson; 16 Yusei Kikuchi; 6 Alek Manoah; 58 Tim Mayza; 46 Wes Parsons; 24 Nate Pearson; 56 Zach Pop; 33 Trevor Richards; 68 Jordan Romano; 99 Hyun-jin Ryu; 50 Erik Swanson; 57 Trent Thornton; 45 Mitch White	Catchers: 55 Tyler Heineman; 9 Danny Jansen; 30 Alejandro Kirk; Infielders: 13 Brandon Belt; 11 Bo Bichette; 8 Cavan Biggio; 26 Matt Chapman; 28 Ernie Clement; 10 Paul DeJong; 5 Santiago Espinal; 27 Vladimir Guerrero Jr.; 48 Spencer Horwitz; 10 Mason McCoy; 15 Whit Merrifield; 36 Davis Schneider	Outfielders: 31 Cam Eden; 39 Kevin Kiermaier; 38 Nathan Lukes; 7 Jordan Luplow; 4 George Springer; 25 Daulton Varsho	Manager: 14 John Schneider; Coaches: 60 Alex Andreopoulos (bullpen catcher); 53 Mark Budzinski (first base); 85 David Howell (pitching strategist); 19 Dave Hudgens (hitting strategist); 78 Luis Hurtado (bullpen catcher); 22 Gil Kim (field coordinator); 18 Guillermo Martínez (hitting); 23 Don Mattingly (bench coach); 59 Hunter Mense (assistant hitting); 20 Luis Rivera (third base); 41 Pete Walker (pitching); 21 Jeff Ware (bullpen); 86 Adam Yudelman (coach)

== Statistics ==
Note: Team leaders in each category are in bold.

=== Batting ===
Note: G = Games played; AB = At bats; R = Runs; H = Hits; 2B = Doubles; 3B = Triples; HR = Home runs; RBI = Runs batted in; SB = Stolen bases; BB = Walks; AVG = Batting average; Ref. = Reference

Player	G	AB	R	H	2B	3B	HR	RBI	SB	BB	AVG	Ref.
Brandon Belt	103	339	53	86	23	0	19	43	0	61	.254	
Bo Bichette	135	571	69	**175**	30	3	20	73	5	27	**.306**	
Cavan Biggio	111	289	54	68	12	0	9	40	5	40	.235	
Matt Chapman	140	509	66	122	**39**	2	17	54	4	62	.240	
Ernie Clement	30	50	7	19	1	1	1	10	1	1	.380	
Paul DeJong	13	44	1	3	0	0	0	1	0	0	.068	
Cam Eden	5	6	1	1	0	0	0	0	0	0	.167	
Santiago Espinal	93	230	30	57	14	0	2	25	2	18	.248	
Vladimir Guerrero Jr.	156	602	78	159	30	0	**26**	**94**	5	**67**	.264	
Tyler Heineman	19	29	4	8	1	1	0	3	0	7	.276	
Spencer Horwitz	15	39	5	10	2	0	1	7	0	4	.256	
Danny Jansen	86	268	38	61	15	0	17	53	0	23	.228	
Kevin Kiermaier	129	370	58	98	21	**6**	8	36	14	29	.265	
Alejandro Kirk	123	372	34	93	16	0	8	43	0	42	.250	
Nathan Lukes	29	26	4	5	1	1	0	2	0	4	.192	
Jordan Luplow	7	14	1	3	0	0	0	1	0	3	.214	
Mason McCoy	6	1	2	0	0	0	0	0	0	0	.000	
Whit Merrifield	145	547	66	149	27	0	11	67	**26**	36	.272	
Davis Schneider	35	116	23	32	12	1	8	20	1	21	.276	
George Springer	154	**613**	**87**	158	25	1	21	72	20	60	.258	
Daulton Varsho	**158**	527	65	116	23	3	20	61	16	45	.220	
**Totals**	**162**	**5562**	**746**	**1423**	**292**	**19**	**188**	**705**	**99**	**550**	**.256**	

=== Pitching ===
- Indicates league leader.

Note: G = Games pitched; GS = Games started; W = Wins; L = Losses; SV = Saves; ERA = Earned run average; WHIP = Walks + hits per inning pitched; IP = Innings pitched; H = Hits allowed; R = Runs allowed; ER = Earned runs allowed; BB = Walks allowed; K = Strikeouts; Ref. = Reference

Player	G	GS	W	L	SV	ERA	WHIP	IP	H	R	ER	BB	K	Ref.
Anthony Bass	22	0	0	0	0	4.95	1.40	20	19	12	11	9	19	
Chris Bassitt	33	**33***	**16***	8	0	3.60	**1.175**	**200**	**176**	**88**	**80**	**59**	186	
José Berríos	32	32	11	**12**	0	3.65	1.186	189 2/3	173	82	77	52	184	
Génesis Cabrera	29	0	1	0	0	2.66	0.97	23 2/3	17	10	7	6	20	
Adam Cimber	22	0	0	2	1	7.40	1.55	20 2/3	25	18	17	7	12	
Ernie Clement	1	0	0	0	0	9.00	3.00	1	3	1	1	0	0	
Hagen Danner	1	0	0	0	0	0.00	0.00	1/3	0	0	0	0	0	
Bowden Francis	20	0	1	0	1	1.73	0.83	36 1/3	22	7	7	8	35	
Yimi García	73	0	3	4	3	4.09	1.24	66	67	35	30	15	79	
Kevin Gausman	31	31	12	9	0	**3.16**	1.178	185	163	72	65	55	**237***	
Chad Green	12	0	3	0	0	5.25	1.33	12	12	10	7	4	16	
Thomas Hatch	6	0	0	0	0	4.26	2.37	6 1/3	10	5	3	5	10	
Jordan Hicks	25	0	2	3	4	2.63	1.08	24	18	9	7	8	22	
Jay Jackson	25	0	3	1	0	2.12	0.91	29 2/3	18	8	7	9	27	
Yusei Kikuchi	32	32	11	6	0	3.86	1.27	167 2/3	165	78	72	48	181	
Alek Manoah	19	19	3	9	0	5.87	1.74	87 1/3	93	61	57	**59**	79	
Tim Mayza	**69**	0	3	1	1	1.52	1.22	53 1/3	50	10	9	15	53	
Wes Parsons	1	1	0	1	0	20.25	3.25	4	10	9	9	3	3	
Nate Pearson	35	0	5	2	1	4.85	1.27	42 2/3	36	25	23	18	43	
Zach Pop	15	0	1	1	0	6.59	1.24	13 2/3	11	11	10	6	14	
Trevor Richards	56	3	2	1	0	4.95	1.35	72 2/3	63	41	40	35	105	
Jordan Romano	59	0	5	7	**36**	2.90	1.22	59	48	20	19	24	72	
Hyun-jin Ryu	11	11	3	3	0	3.46	1.29	52	53	25	20	14	38	
Erik Swanson	**69**	0	4	2	4	2.97	1.10	66 2/3	52	22	22	21	75	
Trent Thornton	4	0	0	0	0	1.69	1.50	5 1/3	7	1	1	1	5	
Mitch White	10	0	0	1	0	7.11	1.74	12 2/3	15	11	10	7	13	
**Totals**	**162**	**162**	**89**	**73**	**51**	**3.78**	**1.25**	**1451 2/3**	**1326**	**671**	**610**	**488**	**1528**	

Note: Bassitt, Berríos, and Gausman WHIP was calculated to 3 decimal points to determine the team leader in WHIP, Bassitt led the team in WHIP.

== Farm system ==
Level	Team	League	Manager	Win–loss record	Division	Postseason	Ref.
Triple-A	Buffalo Bisons	International League	Casey Candaele	34–41 (first half); 42–31 (second half)	East Division	Did not qualify	
Double-A	New Hampshire Fisher Cats	Eastern League	Cesar Martin	35–33 (first half); 27–39 (second half)	Northeast Division	Did not qualify	
High-A	Vancouver Canadians	Northwest League	Brent Lavallee	38–27 (first half); 39–27 (second half)	—N/a	Qualified won F 3–1	
Low-A	Dunedin Blue Jays	Florida State League	Donnie Murphy	32–34 (first half); 30–36 (second half)	West Division	Did not qualify	
Rookie	FCL Blue Jays	Florida Complex League	Jose Mayorga	17–37	North Division	Did not qualify	
Rookie	DSL Blue Jays	Dominican Summer League	Andy Fermin	28–25	Baseball City	Did not qualify	
