= 2023 Tampa Bay Rays season =

Major League Baseball season

2023 Tampa Bay Rays
- American League Wild Card
- League: American League
- Division: East
- Ballpark: Tropicana Field
- City: St. Petersburg, Florida
- Record: 99–63 (.611)
- Divisional place: 2nd
- Owners: Stuart Sternberg
- President of baseball operations: Erik Neander
- General manager: Peter Bendix
- Manager: Kevin Cash
- Television: Bally Sports Sun
- Radio: Tampa Bay Rays Radio Network (English); WGES (Spanish)

The 2023 Tampa Bay Rays season was the 26th season of the Tampa Bay Rays franchise and their 16th as the Rays. The Rays played their home games at Tropicana Field as members of Major League Baseball's American League East.

The Rays started the season with 13 consecutive wins, tying the 1982 Atlanta Braves and the 1987 Milwaukee Brewers for the modern era (post-1900) record, and the most since the 1884 St. Louis Maroons, before suffering their first loss to the Toronto Blue Jays on April 14.

The Rays drew a total attendance of 1,440,301 to home games at Tropicana Field — a 27.6% increase from the previous season but still only 27th of the 30 MLB teams.

On September 17, the Rays qualified for the postseason for the fifth straight year. However, they were defeated by the eventual World Series champion Texas Rangers in the American League Wild Card Series in a two-game sweep.

== Offseason ==
=== Rule changes ===
Pursuant to the CBA, new rule changes will be in place for the 2023 season:

- institution of a pitch clock between pitches;
- limits on pickoff attempts per plate appearance;
- limits on defensive shifts requiring two infielders to be on either side of second and be within the boundary of the infield; and
- larger bases (increased to 18-inch squares);

== Regular season ==
=== Game log ===
Legend
	Rays win
	Rays loss
	Postponement
	Clinched playoff spot
**Bold**	Rays team member

2023 Game Log: 99–63 (Home: 53–28; Away: 46–35)
March/April: 23–6 (Home: 14–2; Away: 9–4)

#	Date	Opponent	Score	Win	Loss	Save	Attendance	Record	Streak/Recap
1	March 30	Tigers	4–0	**McClanahan** (1–0)	Rodríguez (0–1)	—	25,025	1–0	W1
2	April 1	Tigers	12–2	**Eflin** (1–0)	Turnbull (0–1)	—	20,204	2–0	W2
3	April 2	Tigers	5–1	**Springs** (1–0)	Wentz (0–1)	—	19,425	3–0	W3
4	April 3	@ Nationals	6–2	**Rasmussen** (1–0)	Williams (0–1)	—	10,754	4–0	W4
5	April 4	@ Nationals	10–6	**Thompson** (1–0)	Finnegan (0–1)	—	15,272	5–0	W5
6	April 5	@ Nationals	7–2	**McClanahan** (2–0)	Corbin (0–2)	—	13,836	6–0	W6
7	April 7	Athletics	9–5	**Eflin** (2–0)	Waldichuk (0–2)	—	15,980	7–0	W7
8	April 8	Athletics	11–0	**Springs** (2–0)	Fujinami (0–2)	—	15,880	8–0	W8
9	April 9	Athletics	11–0	**Rasmussen** (2–0)	Kaprielian (0–1)	—	11,159	9–0	W9
10	April 10	Red Sox	1–0	**Poche** (1–0)	Martin (0–1)	**Fairbanks** (1)	13,470	10–0	W10
11	April 11	Red Sox	7–2	**McClanahan** (3–0)	Whitlock (0–1)	—	12,649	11–0	W11
12	April 12	Red Sox	9–7	**Bradley** (1–0)	Sale (1–1)	**Fairbanks** (2)	17,136	12–0	W12
13	April 13	Red Sox	9–3	**Kelly** (1–0)	Kluber (0–3)	**Bristo** (1)	21,175	13–0	W13
14	April 14	@ Blue Jays	3–6	Berríos (1–2)	**Rasmussen** (2–1)	Romano (5)	34,822	13–1	L1
15	April 15	@ Blue Jays	2–5	Kikuchi (2–0)	**Kelley** (0–1)	Romano (6)	41,679	13–2	L2
16	April 16	@ Blue Jays	8–1	**McClanahan** (4–0)	Manoah (1–1)	—	39,179	14–2	W1
17	April 17	@ Reds	1–8	Gibaut (1–0)	**Beeks** (0–1)	—	7,375	14–3	L1
18	April 18	@ Reds	10–0	**Bradley** (2–0)	Lodolo (2–1)	—	11,304	15–3	W1
19	April 19	@ Reds	8–0	**Rasmussen** (3–1)	Stoudt (0–1)	—	10,205	16–3	W2
20	April 21	White Sox	8–7	**Kelly** (2–0)	López (0–2)	—	17,973	17–3	W3
21	April 22	White Sox	4–3 (10)	**Cleavinger** (1–0)	Lambert (1–1)	—	22,333	18–3	W4
22	April 23	White Sox	4–1	**Eflin** (3–0)	Giolito (1–2)	**Fairbanks** (3)	22,702	19–3	W5
23	April 24	Astros	8–3	**Bradley** (3–0)	Urquidy (1–2)	—	10,611	20–3	W6
24	April 25	Astros	0–5	García (2–2)	**Rasmussen** (3–2)	—	9,916	20–4	L1
25	April 26	Astros	0–1	Brown (3–0)	**Faucher** (0–1)	Pressly (2)	14,168	20–5	L2
26	April 27	@ White Sox	14–5	**McClanahan** (5–0)	Cease (2–1)	—	11,060	21–5	W1
27	April 28	@ White Sox	3–2	**Poche** (2–0)	Graveman (1–2)	**Kelly** (1)	16,681	22–5	W2
28	April 29	@ White Sox	12–3	**Chirinos** (1–0)	Lynn (0–4)	—	28,462	23–5	W3
29	April 30	@ White Sox	9–12	Bummer (1–1)	**Beeks** (0–2)	—	17,049	23–6	L1

May: 17–12 (Home: 12–4; Away: 5–8)

#	Date	Opponent	Score	Win	Loss	Save	Attendance	Record	Streak/Recap
30	May 2	Pirates	4–1	**Poche** (3–0)	Contreras (3–2)	**Adam** (1)	10,325	24–6	W1
31	May 3	Pirates	8–1	**McClanahan** (6–0)	Keller (3–1)	**Anderson** (1)	15,247	25–6	W2
32	May 4	Pirates	3–2	**Eflin** (4–0)	Velasquez (4–3)	**Adam** (2)	12,418	26–6	W3
33	May 5	Yankees	5–4	**Kelly** (3–0)	Cordero (1–1)	**Adam** (3)	25,007	27–6	W4
34	May 6	Yankees	2–3	Marinaccio (1–1)	**Kelly** (3–1)	Hamilton (1)	27,078	27–7	L1
35	May 7	Yankees	8–7 (10)	**Beeks** (1–2)	Abreu (1–1)	—	32,142	28–7	W1
36	May 8	@ Orioles	3–0	**McClanahan** (7–0)	Gibson (4–2)	**Adam** (4)	12,669	29–7	W2
37	May 9	@ Orioles	2–4	Rodriguez (2–0)	**Eflin** (4–1)	Bautista (8)	10,017	29–8	L1
38	May 10	@ Orioles	1–2	Kremer (4–1)	**Chirinos** (1–1)	Canó (3)	14,395	29–9	L2
39	May 11	@ Yankees	8–2	**Rasmussen** (4–2)	Germán (2–3)	—	37,686	30–9	W1
40	May 12	@ Yankees	5–6	Holmes (1–2)	**Adam** (0–1)	Peralta (1)	46,130	30–10	L1
41	May 13	@ Yankees	8–9	Cordero (3–1)	**Thompson** (1–1)	Peralta (2)	44,714	30–11	L2
42	May 14	@ Yankees	8–7	**Eflin** (5–1)	Schmidt (1–4)	**Adam** (5)	42,116	31–11	W1
43	May 16	@ Mets	8–5	**Chirinos** (2–1)	Verlander (1–2)	—	28,296	32–11	W2
44	May 17	@ Mets	7–8 (10)	Robertson (1–0)	**Fairbanks** (0–1)	—	29,695	32–12	L1
45	May 18	@ Mets	2–3	Megill (5–2)	**Littell** (0–1)	Robertson (8)	29,946	32–13	L2
46	May 19	Brewers	1–0	**Adam** (2–0)	Strzelecki (2–3)	**Fairbanks** (4)	18,961	33–13	W1
47	May 20	Brewers	8–4	**Eflin** (6–1)	Lauer (4–5)	**Adam** (6)	19,954	34–13	W2
48	May 21	Brewers	4–6	Peralta (5–3)	**Criswell** (0–1)	Williams (7)	20,193	34–14	L1
49	May 22	Blue Jays	6–4	**Fleming** (1–0)	Bassitt (5–3)	**Fairbanks** (5)	8,857	35–14	W1
50	May 23	Blue Jays	1–20	Berríos (4–4)	**Bradley** (3–1)	—	11,906	35–15	L1
51	May 24	Blue Jays	7–3	**McClanahan** (8–0)	Kikuchi (5–2)	—	8,699	36–15	W1
52	May 25	Blue Jays	6–3	**Eflin** (7–1)	Manoah (1–5)	**Poche** (1)	10,736	37–15	W2
53	May 26	Dodgers	9–3	**Criswell** (1–1)	Syndergaard (1–4)	—	19,715	38–15	W3
54	May 27	Dodgers	5–6	Almonte (3–0)	**Poche** (3–1)	Ferguson (2)	23,443	38–16	L1
55	May 28	Dodgers	11–10	**Beeks** (2–2)	González (1–2)	**Adam** (7)	21,043	39–16	W1
56	May 29	@ Cubs	0–1	Stroman (5–4)	**Bradley** (3–2)	—	38,163	39–17	L1
57	May 30	@ Cubs	1–2	Merryweather (1–0)	**McClanahan** (8–1)	Alzolay (2)	31,762	39–18	L2
58	May 31	@ Cubs	4–3	**Poche** (4–1)	Leiter Jr. (1–1)	**Beeks** (1)	29,360	40–18	W1

June: 17–10 (Home: 8–4; Away: 9–6)

#	Date	Opponent	Score	Win	Loss	Save	Attendance	Record	Streak/Recap
—	June 2	@ Red Sox	Postponed (rain); Makeup: June 3						
59	June 3 (1)	@ Red Sox	5–8	Kluber (3–6)	**Beeks** (3–6)	Jansen (12)	31,303	40–19	L1
60	June 3 (2)	@ Red Sox	4–2	**Faucher** (1–1)	Jansen (1–3)	**Adam** (8)	30,784	41–19	W1
61	June 4	@ Red Sox	6–2	**Bradley** (4–2)	Houck (3–5)	—	34,192	42–19	W2
62	June 5	@ Red Sox	4–1	**McClanahan** (9–1)	Bello (3–4)	**Adam** (9)	30,860	43–19	W3
63	June 6	Twins	7–0	**Eflin** (8–1)	Varland (3–2)	—	14,689	44–19	W4
64	June 7	Twins	2–1	**Adam** (2–1)	Durán (1–2)	—	10,846	45–19	W5
65	June 8	Twins	4–2	**Chirinos** (3–1)	Ober (3–3)	**Adam** (10)	12,584	46–19	W6
66	June 9	Rangers	8–3	**Glasnow** (1–0)	Heaney (4–4)	—	17,447	47–19	W7
67	June 10	Rangers	4–8	Eovaldi (9–2)	**Bradley** (4–3)	—	18,932	47–20	L1
68	June 11	Rangers	7–3	**McClanahan** (10–1)	Pérez (6–2)	—	23,069	48–20	W1
69	June 12	@ Athletics	3–4	Kaprielian (2–6)	**Eflin** (8–2)	Waldichuk (1)	4,848	48–21	L1
70	June 13	@ Athletics	1–2	Harris (2–0)	**Poche** (4–2)	May (3)	27,759	48–22	L2
71	June 14	@ Athletics	6–3	**Glasnow** (2–0)	Medina (1–6)	**Adam** (11)	7,055	49–22	W1
72	June 15	@ Athletics	4–3	**Stephenson** (1–3)	Pruitt (1–4)	**Fairbanks** (6)	7,133	50–22	W2
73	June 16	@ Padres	6–2	**McClanahan** (11–1)	Darvish (5–5)	**Fairbanks** (7)	42,367	51–22	W3
74	June 17	@ Padres	0–2	Snell (3–6)	**Eflin** (8–3)	Hader (17)	43,180	51–23	L1
75	June 18	@ Padres	4–5	Musgrove (5–2)	**Chirinos** (3–2)	Hader (18)	44,404	51–24	L2
76	June 20	Orioles	6–8	Bradish (3–3)	**Glasnow** (2–1)	Bautista (20)	20,906	51–25	L3
77	June 21	Orioles	7–2	**Bradley** (5–3)	Wells (6–3)	—	19,493	52–25	W1
78	June 22	Royals	5–6	Chapman (3–2)	**Fairbanks** (0–2)	Barlow (9)	10,436	52–26	L1
79	June 23	Royals	11–3	**Eflin** (9–3)	Greinke (1–8)	—	16,189	53–26	W1
80	June 24	Royals	4–9	Lyles (1–11)	**Chirinos** (3–3)	—	20,884	53–27	L1
81	June 25	Royals	3–1	**Poche** (5–2)	Clarke (1–2)	**Fairbanks** (8)	18,442	54–27	W1
82	June 27	@ Diamondbacks	4–8	Gallen (10–2)	**Bradley** (5–4)	—	23,351	54–28	L1
83	June 28	@ Diamondbacks	3–2	**Poche** (6–2)	McGough (0–6)	**Fairbanks** (9)	20,858	55–28	W1
84	June 29	@ Diamondbacks	6–1	**Chirinos** (4–3)	Pfaadt (0–3)	—	22,127	56–28	W2
85	June 30	@ Mariners	15–4	**Kelly** (4–1)	Muñoz (0–1)	—	37,063	57–28	W3

July: 8–16 (Home: 3–9; Away: 5–7)

#	Date	Opponent	Score	Win	Loss	Save	Attendance	Record	Streak/Recap
86	July 1	@ Mariners	3–8	Kirby (7–7)	**Glasnow** (2–2)	Sewald (15)	35,546	57–29	L1
87	July 2	@ Mariners	6–7	Muñoz (1–1)	**Adam** (2–2)	Sewald (16)	36,541	57–30	L2
88	July 4	Phillies	1–3	Nola (8–5)	**Eflin** (9–4)	Kimbrel (13)	22,665	57–31	L3
89	July 5	Phillies	4–8	Walker (10–3)	**Chirinos** (4–4)	—	18,208	57–32	L4
90	July 6	Phillies	1–3 (11)	Strahm (5–3)	**Thompson** (1–2)	—	17,060	57–33	L5
91	July 7	Braves	1–2	Morton (9–6)	**Glasnow** (2–3)	Iglesias (16)	25,025	57–34	L6
92	July 8	Braves	1–6	Strider (11–2)	**Bradley** (5–5)	—	25,025	57–35	L7
93	July 9	Braves	10–4	**Eflin** (10–4)	Elder (7–2)	—	25,025	58–35	W1
**93rd All-Star Game in Seattle**
—	July 14	@ Royals	Postponed (rain); Makeup: July 15						
94	July 15 (1)	@ Royals	6–1	**Glasnow** (3–3)	Marsh (0–3)	—	15,428	59–35	W2
95	July 15 (2)	@ Royals	4–2	**Poche** (7–2)	Hernández (0–5)	**Fairbanks** (10)	18,052	60–35	W3
96	July 16	@ Royals	4–8	Singer (6–8)	**Eflin** (10–5)	—	15,632	60–36	L1
97	July 17	@ Rangers	2–3	Chapman (5–2)	**Fairbanks** (0–3)	—	29,901	60–37	L2
98	July 18	@ Rangers	3–5	Eovaldi (11–3)	**Bradley** (5–6)	Smith (17)	34,677	60–38	L3
99	July 19	@ Rangers	1–5	Burke (4–2)	**Littell** (0–2)	—	31,591	60–39	L4
100	July 20	Orioles	3–4 (10)	Bautista (5–1)	**Stephenson** (1–4)	—	20,203	60–40	L5
101	July 21	Orioles	3–0	**Eflin** (11–5)	Bradish (6–5)	**Fairbanks** (11)	19,703	61–40	W1
102	July 22	Orioles	5–6	Pérez (3–1)	**Fairbanks** (0–4)	Bautista (27)	25,025	61–41	L1
103	July 23	Orioles	3–5	Baumann (7–0)	**Poche** (7–3)	Bautista (28)	23,440	61–42	L2
104	July 25	Marlins	4–1	**Glasnow** (4–3)	Cabrera (5–6)	**Fairbanks** (12)	20,508	62–42	W1
105	July 26	Marlins	1–7	Alcántara (4–9)	**Eflin** (11–6)	—	20,971	62–43	L1
106	July 28	@ Astros	4–3	**Poche** (8–3)	Pressly (3–3)	**Fairbanks** (13)	38,592	63–43	W1
107	July 29	@ Astros	4–17	Brown (7–7)	**Bradley** (5–7)	—	40,004	63–44	L1
108	July 30	@ Astros	8–2	**Littell** (1–2)	Bielak (5–6)	—	40,357	64–44	W1
109	July 31	@ Yankees	5–1	**Glasnow** (5–3)	Brito (4–5)	—	43,613	65–44	W2

August: 17–8 (Home: 8–4; Away: 9–4)

#	Date	Opponent	Score	Win	Loss	Save	Attendance	Record	Streak/Recap
110	August 1	@ Yankees	5–2	**Eflin** (12–6)	Rodón (1–4)	**Fairbanks** (14)	38,047	66–44	W3
111	August 2	@ Yankees	2–7	Cole (10–2)	**McClanahan** (11–2)	—	38,740	66–45	L1
112	August 4	@ Tigers	8–0	**Littell** (2–2)	Olson (1–5)	—	26,050	67–45	W1
113	August 5	@ Tigers	2–4	Skubal (2–1)	**Civale** (5–3)	Brieske (1)	30,939	67–46	L1
114	August 6	@ Tigers	10–6	**Poche** (9–3)	Manning (3–4)	—	21,824	68–46	W1
115	August 8	Cardinals	4–2	**Adam** (3–2)	Mikolas (6–8)	**Fairbanks** (15)	15,522	69–46	W2
116	August 9	Cardinals	4–6	Hudson (3–0)	**Kelly** (4–2)	Gallegos (9)	11,203	69–47	L1
117	August 10	Cardinals	2–5	Liberatore (2–4)	**Littell** (2–3)	—	11,990	69–48	L2
118	August 11	Guardians	9–8	**Stephenson** (2–4)	Sandlin (5–5)	—	19,625	70–48	W1
119	August 12	Guardians	6–5	**Fleming** (2–0)	Clase (1–7)	—	25,025	71–48	W2
120	August 13	Guardians	2–9	Bibee (9–2)	**Eflin** (12–7)	—	22,163	71–49	L1
121	August 14	@ Giants	10–2	**Glasnow** (6–3)	Beck (3–2)	**Lopez** (1)	25,748	72–49	W1
122	August 15	@ Giants	0–7	Manaea (4–3)	**Littell** (2–4)	—	26,322	72–50	L1
123	August 16	@ Giants	6–1	**Civale** (6–3)	Walker (4–2)	—	27,510	73–50	W1
124	August 18	@ Angels	9–6 (10)	**Fairbanks** (1–4)	Estévez (5–4)	**Kittredge** (1)	38,297	74–50	W2
125	August 19 (1)	@ Angels	6–7	Canning (7–4)	**Glasnow** (6–4)	López (6)	27,309	74–51	L1
126	August 19 (2)	@ Angels	18–4	**Eflin** (13–7)	Sandoval (6–10)	—	33,803	75–51	W1
—	August 20	@ Angels	Rescheduled due to Hurricane Hilary;Moved to August 19						
127	August 22	Rockies	12–4	**Kittredge** (1–0)	Suter (4–1)	—	10,235	76–51	W2
128	August 23	Rockies	6–5 (10)	**Fairbanks** (2–4)	Suter (4–2)	—	12,001	77–51	W3
129	August 24	Rockies	5–3	**Adam** (4–2)	Koch (2–2)	**Fairbanks** (16)	9,972	78–51	W4
130	August 25	Yankees	2–6	Cole (11–4)	**Eflin** (13–8)	—	22,679	78–52	L1
131	August 26	Yankees	3–0	**Glasnow** (7–4)	Schmidt (8–8)	**Fairbanks** (17)	22,943	79–52	W1
132	August 27	Yankees	7–4	**Littell** (3–4)	Hamilton (2–2)	**Adam** (12)	22,624	80–52	W2
133	August 29	@ Marlins	11–2	**Civale** (7–4)	Alcántara (6–12)	—	10,338	81–52	W3
134	August 30	@ Marlins	3–0 (10)	**Armstrong** (1–0)	Robertson (4–6)	**Fairbanks** (18)	9,803	82–52	W4

September/October: 17–11 (Home: 8–5; Away: 9–6)

#	Date	Opponent	Score	Win	Loss	Save	Attendance	Record	Streak/Recap
135	September 1	@ Guardians	2–3	Morgan (5–2)	**Glasnow** (7–5)	Clase (37)	25,685	82–53	L1
136	September 2	@ Guardians	6–7 (11)	Hentges (3–2)	**Devenski** (3–3)	—	27,788	82–54	L2
137	September 3	@ Guardians	6–2	**Poche** (10–3)	Stephan (6–5)	**Fairbanks** (19)	25,556	83–54	W1
138	September 4	Red Sox	3–7	Bello (11–8)	**Devenski** (3–4)	—	18,302	83–55	L1
139	September 5	Red Sox	8–6 (11)	**Ramírez** (3–3)	Jansen (3–6)	—	9,119	84–55	W1
140	September 6	Red Sox	3–1	**Glasnow** (8–5)	Pivetta (9–8)	**Fairbanks** (20)	10,100	85–55	W2
141	September 7	Mariners	0–1	Castillo (12–7)	**Littell** (3–5)	Muñoz (12)	10,060	85–56	L1
142	September 8	Mariners	7–4	**Devenski** (4–4)	Campbell (4–1)	**Fairbanks** (21)	21,243	86–56	W1
143	September 9	Mariners	7–5	**Poche** (11–3)	Saucedo (3–2)	—	18,008	87–56	W2
144	September 10	Mariners	6–3	**Eflin** (14–8)	Miller (8–5)	**Fairbanks** (22)	18,230	88–56	W3
145	September 11	@ Twins	7–4	**Glasnow** (9–5)	Gray (7–7)	**Fairbanks** (23)	18,683	89–56	W4
146	September 12	@ Twins	2–3	Varland (4–3)	**Littell** (3–6)	Durán (26)	24,390	89–57	L1
147	September 13	@ Twins	5–4	**Kelly** (5–2)	Jax (6–10)	**Stephenson** (1)	18,342	90–57	W1
148	September 14	@ Orioles	4–3	**Poche** (12–3)	Bradish (11–7)	**Fairbanks** (24)	24,835	91–57	W2
149	September 15	@ Orioles	7–1	**Eflin** (15–8)	Flaherty (8–9)	—	43,359	92–57	W3
150	September 16	@ Orioles	0–8	Rodriguez (6–4)	**Glasnow** (9–6)	—	38,432	92–58	L1
151	September 17*	@ Orioles	4–5 (11)	Hall (2–0)	**Diekman** (0–2)	—	37,297	92–59	L2
152	September 19	Angels	6–2	**Stephenson** (3–4)	Loup (2–3)	—	15,176	93–59	W1
153	September 20	Angels	3–8	Wantz (2–0)	**Civale** (7–4)	—	15,145	93–60	L1
154	September 21	Angels	5–4	**Kittredge** (2–0)	Estévez (5–5)	—	12,966	94–60	W1
155	September 22	Blue Jays	2–6	Bassitt (15–8)	**Glasnow** (9–7)	Romano (36)	18,538	94–61	L1
156	September 23	Blue Jays	7–6	**Devenski** (5–4)	Romano (5–6)	—	22,655	95–61	W1
157	September 24	Blue Jays	5–9	Richards (2–1)	**Bradley** (5–8)	—	22,472	95–62	L1
158	September 26	@ Red Sox	9–7	**Eflin** (16–8)	Houck (5–10)	**Fairbanks** (25)	34,094	96–62	W1
159	September 27	@ Red Sox	5–0	**Glasnow** (10–7)	Bello (12–11)	—	34,559	97–62	W2
160	September 29	@ Blue Jays	4–11	Kikuchi (11–6)	**Civale** (7–5)	—	42,394	97–63	L1
161	September 30	@ Blue Jays	7–5 (10)	**Devenski** (6–4)	Hicks (3–9)	—	42,097	98–63	W1
162	October 1	@ Blue Jays	12–8	**Lopez** (1–0)	Parsons (0–1)	—	42,058	99–63	W2
* Despite losing to Baltimore on September 17, the Rays clinched a playoff berth on this day by virtue of a Texas loss.

== Season standings ==
=== American League East ===
AL East
Team	W	L	Pct.	GB	Home	Road
Baltimore Orioles	101	61	.623	—	49‍–‍32	52‍–‍29
Tampa Bay Rays	99	63	.611	2	53‍–‍28	46‍–‍35
Toronto Blue Jays	89	73	.549	12	43‍–‍38	46‍–‍35
New York Yankees	82	80	.506	19	42‍–‍39	40‍–‍41
Boston Red Sox	78	84	.481	23	39‍–‍42	39‍–‍42

=== American League Wild Card ===
Division leaders
Team	W	L	Pct.
Baltimore Orioles	101	61	.623
Houston Astros	90	72	.556
Minnesota Twins	87	75	.537

Wild Card teams (Top 3 teams qualify for postseason)
Team	W	L	Pct.	GB
Tampa Bay Rays	99	63	.611	+10
Texas Rangers	90	72	.556	+1
Toronto Blue Jays	89	73	.549	—
Seattle Mariners	88	74	.543	1
New York Yankees	82	80	.506	7
Boston Red Sox	78	84	.481	11
Detroit Tigers	78	84	.481	11
Cleveland Guardians	76	86	.469	13
Los Angeles Angels	73	89	.451	16
Chicago White Sox	61	101	.377	28
Kansas City Royals	56	106	.346	33
Oakland Athletics	50	112	.309	39

=== Record vs. opponents ===
==== Record vs. American League ====
2023 American League record Source: MLB Standings Grid – 2023
Team	BAL	BOS	CWS	CLE	DET	HOU	KC	LAA	MIN	NYY	OAK	SEA	TB	TEX	TOR	NL
Baltimore	—	7–6	4–2	3–4	6–1	3–3	5–1	5–2	4–2	7–6	6–1	4–2	8–5	3–3	10–3	26–20
Boston	6–7	—	2–4	3–3	5–1	2–5	5–2	3–4	4–3	9–4	4–2	3–3	2–11	3–3	7–6	20–26
Chicago	2–4	4–2	—	8–5	5–8	3–4	6–7	3–4	4–9	4–2	3–4	2–4	1–6	1–5	0–6	15–31
Cleveland	4–3	3–3	5–8	—	4–9	2–4	7–6	3–4	7–6	2–4	5–1	4–3	3–3	3–3	4–3	20–26
Detroit	1–6	1–5	8–5	9–4	—	3–3	10–3	3–3	8–5	2–5	3–4	3–3	1–5	3–4	2–4	21–25
Houston	3–3	5–2	4–3	4–2	3–3	—	1–5	9–4	2–4	2–5	10–3	4–9	3–3	9–4	3–4	28–18
Kansas City	1–5	2–5	7–6	6–7	3–10	5–1	—	2–4	4–9	2–4	2–4	1–6	3–4	1–5	1–6	16–30
Los Angeles	2–5	4–3	4–3	4–3	3–3	4–9	4–2	—	3–3	4–2	7–6	5–8	2–4	6–7	2–4	19–27
Minnesota	2–4	3–4	9–4	6–7	5–8	4–2	9–4	3–3	—	4–3	5–1	3–4	1–5	5–2	3–3	25–21
New York	6–7	4–9	2–4	4–2	5–2	5–2	4–2	2–4	3–4	—	5–1	4–2	5–8	3–4	7–6	23–23
Oakland	1–6	2–4	4–3	1–5	4–3	3–10	4–2	6–7	1–5	1–5	—	1–12	2–5	4–9	2–4	14–32
Seattle	2–4	3–3	4–2	3–4	3–3	9–4	6–1	8–5	4–3	2–4	12–1	—	3–4	4–9	3–3	22–24
Tampa Bay	5–8	11–2	6–1	3–3	5–1	3–3	4–3	4–2	5–1	8–5	5–2	4–3	—	2–4	7–6	27–19
Texas	3–3	3–3	5–1	3–3	4–3	4–9	5–1	7–6	2–5	4–3	9–4	9–4	4–2	—	6–1	22–24
Toronto	3–10	6–7	6–0	3–4	4–2	4–3	6–1	4–2	3–3	6–7	4–2	3–3	6–7	1–6	—	30–16

Updated with the results of all games through October 1, 2023.

==== Record vs. National League ====
2023 American League record vs. National League Source: MLB Standings
Team	ARI	ATL	CHC	CIN	COL	LAD	MIA	MIL	NYM	PHI	PIT	SD	SF	STL	WSH
Baltimore	2–1	1–2	1–2	1–2	2–1	1–2	3–0	1–2	3–0	1–2	2–1	1–2	2–1	1–2	4–0
Boston	2–1	3–1	2–1	1–2	1–2	1–2	0–3	2–1	2–1	2–1	0–3	2–1	1–2	0–3	1–2
Chicago	1–2	2–1	1–3	2–1	1–2	1–2	1–2	0–3	1–2	1–2	1–2	0–3	1–2	1–2	1–2
Cleveland	1–2	1–2	2–1	2–2	1–2	1–2	1–2	1–2	0–3	2–1	2–1	1–2	1–2	2–1	2–1
Detroit	0–3	1–2	1–2	1–2	2–1	1–2	1–2	2–1	3–0	0–3	2–2	1–2	3–0	2–1	1–2
Houston	3–0	3–0	3–0	0–3	3–1	1–2	2–1	1–2	2–1	1–2	2–1	2–1	1–2	2–1	2–1
Kansas City	1–2	0–3	1–2	0–3	1–2	2–1	0–3	0–3	3–0	1–2	0–3	2–1	2–1	2–2	1–2
Los Angeles	1–2	1–2	3–0	0–3	1–2	0–4	0–3	1–2	2–1	1–2	2–1	0–3	2–1	3–0	2–1
Minnesota	3–0	0–3	2–1	2–1	2–1	1–2	1–2	2–2	2–1	2–1	2–1	2–1	1–2	2–1	1–2
New York	2–1	0–3	1–2	3–0	1–2	2–1	1–2	1–2	2–2	2–1	2–1	2–1	2–1	1–2	1–2
Oakland	1–2	2–1	0–3	1–2	2–1	0–3	0–3	3–0	0–3	0–3	2–1	0–3	2–2	1–2	0–3
Seattle	2–1	1–2	1–2	1–2	3–0	0–3	2–1	0–3	1–2	1–2	2–1	3–1	2–1	2–1	1–2
Tampa Bay	2–1	1–2	1–2	2–1	3–0	2–1	3–1	2–1	1–2	0–3	3–0	1–2	2–1	1–2	3–0
Texas	1–3	1–2	1–2	0–3	3–0	1–2	3–0	0–3	2–1	3–0	2–1	0–3	2–1	2–1	1–2
Toronto	3–0	3–0	1–2	2–1	2–1	2–1	2–1	2–1	3–0	1–3	3–0	1–2	2–1	1–2	2–1

Updated with the results of all games through October 1, 2023.

== Postseason ==
=== Postseason game log ===
2023 Postseason Game Log
American League Wild Card Series

#	Date	Opponent	Score	Win	Loss	Save	Location Attendance	Series
1	October 3	Rangers	0–4	Montgomery (1–0)	Glasnow (0–1)	—	Tropicana Field; 19,704	0–1
2	October 4	Rangers	1–7	Eovaldi (1–0)	Eflin (0–1)	—	Tropicana Field; 20,198	0–2

=== Postseason rosters ===
Playoff rosters
American League Wild Card Series

- Pitchers: 20 Tyler Glasnow 24 Zach Eflin 26 Robert Stephenson 29 Pete Fairbanks 30 Jake Diekman 34 Aaron Civale 36 Andrew Kittredge 38 Colin Poche 48 Chris Devenski 52 Zack Littell 64 Shawn Armstrong
- Catchers: 14 Christian Bethancourt 50 René Pinto
- Infielders: 1 Junior Caminero 2 Yandy Díaz 6 Taylor Walls 17 Isaac Paredes 25 Curtis Mead 37 Osleivis Basabe 62 Jonathan Aranda
- Outfielders: 10 Raimel Tapia 13 Manuel Margot 15 Josh Lowe 22 José Siri 56 Randy Arozarena
- Designated hitters: 43 Harold Ramírez

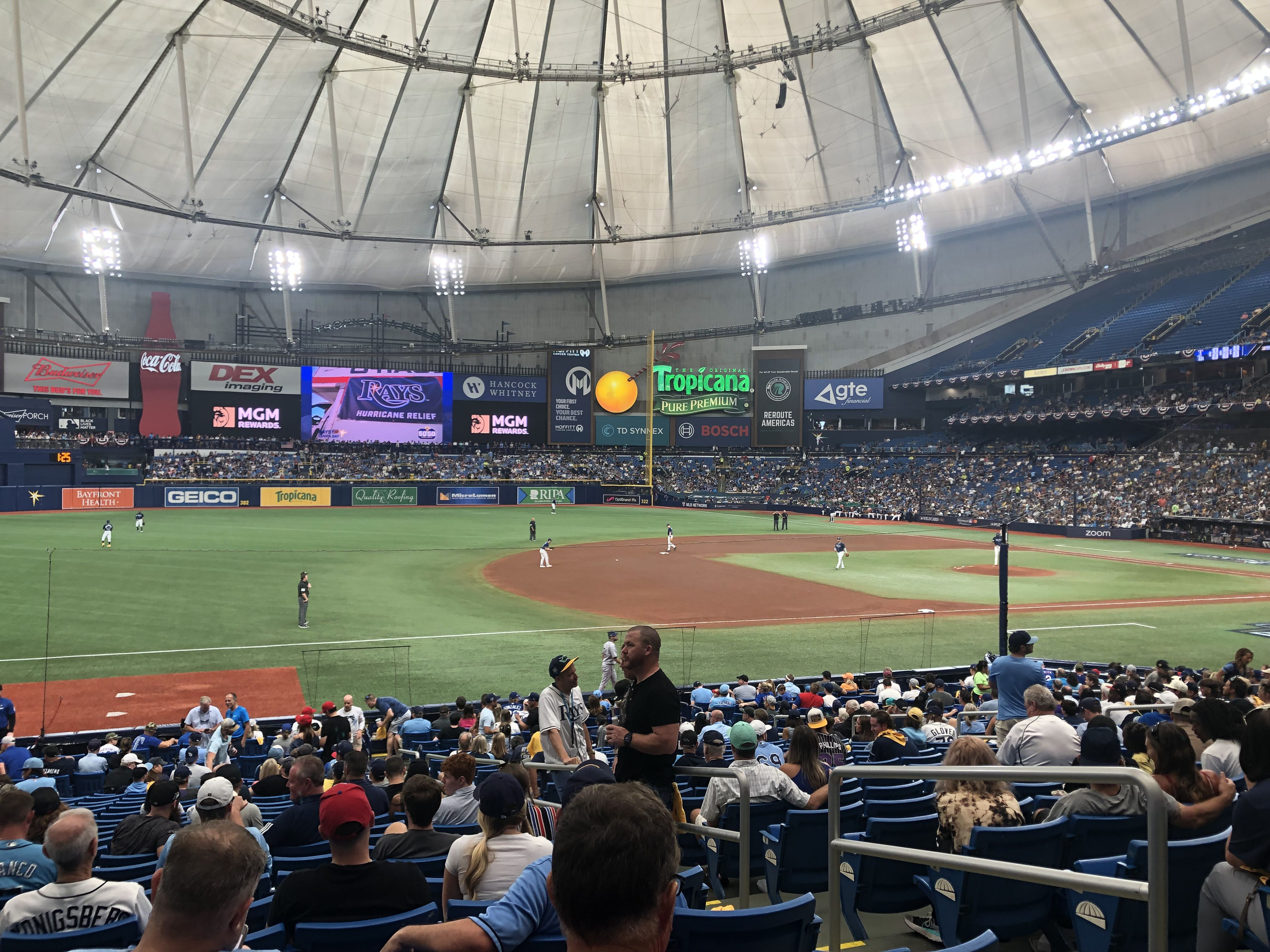
Photo of the second Wild Card game against the Rangers.

== Roster ==
2023 Tampa Bay Rays
Roster
Pitchers: 47 Jason Adam; 48 Chase Anderson; 64 Shawn Armstrong; 68 Jalen Beeks; 45 Taj Bradley; 54 Braden Bristo; 70 Zack Burdi; 72 Yonny Chirinos; 34 Aaron Civale; 60 Garrett Cleavinger; 71 Cooper Criswell; 48 Chris Devenski; 30 Jake Diekman; 24 Zach Eflin; 29 Peter Fairbanks; 58 Calvin Faucher; 19 Josh Fleming; 20 Tyler Glasnow; 99 Javy Guerra; 53 Heath Hembree; 44 Trevor Kelley; 49 Kevin Kelly; 36 Andrew Kittredge; 73 Joe La Sorsa; 52 Zack Littell; 74 Jacob Lopez; 75 José López; 18 Shane McClanahan; 1 Luis Patiño; 67 Héctor Pérez; 38 Colin Poche; 61 Erasmo Ramírez; 57 Drew Rasmussen; 88 Elvin Rodriguez; 59 Jeffrey Springs; 26 Robert Stephenson; 81 Ryan Thompson	Catchers: 14 Christian Bethancourt; 21 Francisco Mejía; 50 René Pinto; Infielders: 62 Jonathan Aranda; 37 Osleivis Basabe; 7 Vidal Bruján; 1 Junior Caminero; 2 Yandy Díaz; 5 Wander Franco; 9 Tristan Gray; 8 Brandon Lowe; 25 Curtis Mead; 17 Isaac Paredes; 6 Taylor Walls	Outfielders: 56 Randy Arozarena; 15 Josh Lowe; 13 Manuel Margot; 55 Luke Raley; 43 Harold Ramírez; 22 José Siri; 10 Raimel Tapia	Manager: 16 Kevin Cash; Coaches: 40 Dan DeMent (assistant hitting); 99 Misha Dworken (bullpen catcher); 97 Jonathan Erlichman (analytics coach); 46 Tomas Francisco (field coordinator); 92 Rick Knapp (assistant pitching); 27 Rodney Linares (bench); 33 Jorge Moncada (bullpen); 51 Chad Mottola (hitting); 53 Brady North (assistant hitting); 31 Chris Prieto (first base); 23 Kyle Snyder (pitching); 4 Brady Williams (third base)

== Player statistics ==
= Indicates team leader

= Indicates league leader

=== Batting ===
Note: G = Games played; AB = At bats; R = Runs; H = Hits; 2B = Doubles; 3B = Triples; HR = Home runs; RBI = Runs batted in; SB = Stolen bases; BB = Walks; AVG = Batting average; SLG = Slugging average

Player	G	AB	R	H	2B	3B	HR	RBI	SB	BB	AVG	SLG
Randy Arozarena	151	551	95	140	19	3	23	83	22	80	.254	.425
Yandy Díaz	137	525	95	173	35	0	22	78	0	65	.330	.522
Isaac Paredes	143	492	71	123	24	0	31	98	1	58	.250	.488
Josh Lowe	135	466	71	136	33	2	20	83	32	31	.292	.500
Wander Franco	112	442	65	124	23	6	17	58	30	42	.281	.475
Harold Ramírez	122	400	58	125	19	2	12	68	5	22	.313	.460
Brandon Lowe	109	377	58	87	15	1	21	68	7	50	.231	.443
Luke Raley	118	357	56	89	23	3	19	49	14	28	.249	.490
José Siri	101	338	58	75	13	2	25	56	12	20	.222	.494
Christian Bethancourt	104	315	49	71	16	0	11	33	1	13	.225	.381
Manuel Margot	99	311	39	82	21	1	4	38	9	18	.264	.376
Taylor Walls	99	303	50	61	12	2	8	36	22	44	.201	.333
Francisco Mejía	50	150	22	34	11	0	5	19	0	6	.227	.400
René Pinto	38	103	10	26	3	0	6	16	0	2	.252	.456
Jonathan Aranda	34	87	13	20	4	1	2	13	0	13	.230	.368
Osleivis Basabe	31	87	15	19	5	0	1	12	0	6	.218	.310
Curtis Mead	24	83	12	21	3	1	1	5	0	7	.253	.349
Vidal Bruján	37	76	14	13	2	0	0	6	3	5	.171	.197
Junior Caminero	7	34	4	8	1	0	1	7	0	2	.235	.353
Raimel Tapia	5	9	4	3	0	0	0	0	2	2	.333	.333
Tristan Gray	2	5	1	2	0	0	1	1	0	0	.400	1.000
Totals	162	5511	860	1432	282	24	230	827	160	514	.260	.445
Rank in AL	—	6	2	4	7	6	4	2	2	8	2	2

Source:Baseball Reference

=== Pitching ===
Note: W = Wins; L = Losses; ERA = Earned run average; G = Games pitched; GS = Games started; SV = Saves; IP = Innings pitched; H = Hits allowed; R = Runs allowed; ER = Earned runs allowed; BB = Walks allowed; SO = Strikeouts

Player	W	L	ERA	G	GS	SV	IP	H	R	ER	BB	SO
Zach Eflin	16	8	3.50	31	31	0	177.2	158	69	69	24	186
Tyler Glasnow	10	7	3.53	21	21	0	120.0	93	52	47	37	162
Shane McClanahan	11	2	3.29	21	21	0	115.0	95	42	42	41	121
Taj Bradley	5	8	5.59	23	21	0	104.2	106	69	65	39	129
Zack Littell	3	6	3.93	26	14	0	87.0	91	40	38	9	72
Kevin Kelly	5	2	3.09	57	0	1	67.0	53	27	23	15	56
Yonny Chirinos	4	4	4.02	15	4	0	62.2	58	30	28	20	31
Colin Poche	12	3	2.23	66	0	1	60.2	42	17	15	24	61
Jason Adam	4	2	2.98	56	0	12	54.1	35	21	18	20	69
Shawn Armstrong	1	0	1.38	39	6	0	52.0	36	12	8	11	54
Josh Fleming	2	0	4.70	12	3	0	51.2	56	29	27	19	25
Pete Fairbanks	2	4	2.58	49	0	25	45.1	26	14	13	20	68
Jake Diekman	0	1	2.18	50	0	0	45.1	26	15	11	25	53
Aaron Civale	2	3	5.36	10	10	0	45.1	51	27	27	11	58
Drew Rasmussen	4	2	2.62	8	8	0	44.2	36	13	13	11	47
Jalen Beeks	2	3	5.95	30	8	1	42.1	42	28	28	21	47
Robert Stephenson	3	1	2.35	42	0	1	38.1	18	11	10	8	60
Erasmo Ramírez	1	0	6.48	15	2	0	33.1	46	27	24	7	30
Cooper Criswell	1	1	5.73	10	0	0	33.0	40	23	21	11	27
Calvin Faucher	1	1	7.01	17	4	0	25.2	31	20	20	12	25
Ryan Thompson	1	2	6.11	18	0	0	17.2	14	13	12	7	12
Jeffrey Springs	2	0	0.56	3	3	0	16.0	4	1	1	4	24
Trevor Kelley	0	1	5.87	10	3	0	15.1	16	10	10	6	11
Jacob Lopez	1	0	4.38	4	1	1	12.1	14	7	6	2	8
Garrett Cleavinger	1	0	3.00	15	0	0	12.0	6	5	4	6	14
Andrew Kittredge	2	0	3.09	14	0	1	11.2	12	4	4	2	10
Javy Guerra	0	0	4.09	9	2	0	11.0	7	5	5	13	9
Chris Devenski	3	2	2.08	9	0	0	8.2	5	4	2	2	9
Chase Anderson	0	0	0.00	2	0	1	5.0	2	0	0	1	2
Joe La Sorsa	0	0	2.08	2	0	0	4.1	3	1	1	3	3
Zack Burdi	0	0	11.25	3	0	0	4.0	6	6	5	2	5
Luis Patiño	0	0	9.00	2	0	0	4.0	5	4	4	2	5
Elvin Rodríguez	0	0	0.00	1	0	0	3.1	0	0	0	0	5
Braden Bristo	0	0	0.00	1	0	1	3.0	0	0	0	1	4
Luke Raley	0	0	30.38	2	0	0	2.2	11	9	9	0	1
José López	0	0	4.50	1	0	0	2.0	3	1	1	1	2
Heath Hembree	0	0	0.00	1	0	0	1.1	0	0	0	1	2
René Pinto	0	0	45.00	1	0	0	1.0	5	5	5	0	0
Christian Bethancourt	0	0	81.00	1	0	0	0.1	3	3	3	0	0
Héctor Pérez	0	0	27.00	1	0	0	0.1	3	1	1	1	0
Totals	99	63	3.86	162	162	45	1442.0	1258	665	618	439	1507
Rank in AL	2	14	3	—	—	4	8	1	3	3	2	3

Source:Baseball Reference

== Farm system ==
Level	Team	League	Manager
AAA	Durham Bulls	International League	Brady Williams
AA	Montgomery Biscuits	Southern League	Morgan Ensberg
High-A	Bowling Green Hot Rods	South Atlantic League	
A	Charleston RiverDogs	Carolina League	
Rookie	FCL Rays	Florida Complex League	
Foreign Rookie	DSL Rays 1	Dominican Summer League	
Foreign Rookie	DSL Rays 2	Dominican Summer League	
