= Hagen Danner =

American baseball player (born 1998)

Washington Nationals
- Pitcher
- Born: September 30, 1998 (age 28); Huntington Beach, California, U.S.
- Bats: Right Throws: Right

MLB debut
- August 11, 2023, for the Toronto Blue Jays

MLB statistics (through 2023 season)
- Win–loss record: 0–0
- Earned run average: 0.00
- Strikeouts: 0
- Stats at Baseball Reference

Teams
- Toronto Blue Jays (2023)
Medals
Men's baseball
Representing United States
U-18 Baseball World Cup
| Gold medal – first place | 2015 Osaka | Team |

Hagen Jarrell Danner (born September 30, 1998) is an American professional baseball pitcher in the Washington Nationals organization. He has previously played in Major League Baseball (MLB) for the Toronto Blue Jays.

== Amateur career ==
In 2011, Danner played for Ocean View Little League, along with Nick Pratto, the team representing his hometown of Huntington Beach, California in the Little League World Series. Ocean View defeated the team from Hamamatsu, Japan 2–1 to win the Little League World Series Championship. Danner batted .500 in the tournament and hit 2 home runs, including a game-tying solo home run in the championship game. On the mound, he earned two wins and struck out 17 batters in 8 1/3 innings. In 2015, he played for Team USA in the U-18 Baseball World Cup.

Danner attended Huntington Beach High School, where he played both catcher and pitcher. In his senior season, he hit .350 with 12 home runs and 40 runs batted in (RBI), and went 11–1 with a 1.22 earned run average (ERA) and 92 strikeouts in 63 1/3 innings pitched. He was named California's high school player of the year by the Los Angeles Times and the Orange County Register. He committed to play college baseball for the UCLA Bruins.

== Professional career ==
=== Toronto Blue Jays ===
==== 2017–2020: Drafted as a catcher ====
Danner was considered a top prospect at both pitcher and catcher prior to the 2017 Major League Baseball draft. He was selected as a catcher in the second round with the 61st overall pick by the Toronto Blue Jays. On June 25, Danner signed for a $1.5 million bonus and was assigned to the Gulf Coast League Blue Jays on June 28. He appeared in 34 games, and hit .160 with two home runs and 20 RBI.

In 2018, Danner played with the Rookie Advanced Bluefield Blue Jays, where he hit .279 with two home runs and 19 RBI in 32 games. In 2019, he played for the Single-A Lansing Lugnuts, batting .170 with 12 home runs and 33 RBI in 80 games.

Danner did not play in a game in 2020 due to the cancellation of the minor league season because of the COVID-19 pandemic.

==== 2021–2022: Position change and injury ====
In 2021, Danner moved to the mound, appearing in 25 games for the High-A Vancouver Canadians. In 35 2/3 innings, he posted a 2–1 win–loss record, 2.02 ERA, and 42 strikeouts. On November 19, 2021, Toronto added Danner to the 40-man roster to protect him from the Rule 5 draft.

In 2022, Danner pitched for the Double-A New Hampshire Fisher Cats. His season ended after only April 4 relief appearances due to an elbow strain. He pitched in 8 games for the Salt River Rafters in the Arizona Fall League.

==== 2023–2024: MLB debut ended by injury ====
Danner returned for injury with two games for the Single-A Dunedin Blue Jays in late April before returning to New Hampshire for 8 games in May. He was promoted to the Triple-A Buffalo Bisons at the end of May. In 23 games for Buffalo, he had a 3.81 ERA with 35 strikeouts and 1 save in 28 1/3 innings pitched. On August 11, Danner was promoted to the major leagues for the first time. He made his MLB debut that night against the Chicago Cubs, but retired only one batter before leaving with an injury. Danner retired Seiya Suzuki on a line drive out and reached a full count on the next batter, Yan Gomes, before departing with an injury. Gomes hit a double off Danner's replacement, Jay Jackson, on the next pitch. The double was charged to Jackson, so Danner is credited with only facing one batter in his debut. The next day, Danner was diagnosed with a left oblique strain and placed on the injured list. He was transferred to the 60-day injured list on September 1, ending his season.

Danner did not pitch in the majors in 2024. He made 33 relief appearances for Buffalo, compiling a 3–0 record and 3.15 ERA with 34 strikeouts and 7 saves across 34 1/3 innings pitched. He missed two months of the season with an undisclosed injury, making on rehab appearance for Dunedin in August.

Danner was designated for assignment by the Blue Jays on December 20, 2024.

=== Seattle Mariners ===
On January 8, 2025, the Seattle Mariners claimed Danner off waivers. He was optioned to the Triple-A Tacoma Rainiers to begin the 2025 season. After two scoreless appearances for Tacoma, Danner was designated for assignment on April 4. He cleared waivers and was sent outright to Triple-A on April 7. Danner elected free agency following the season on November 6.

=== Cincinnati Reds ===
On January 7, 2026, Danner signed a minor league contract with the Cincinnati Reds. He made 30 relief appearances for the Triple–A Louisville Bats, compiling a 1–1 record and 6.89 ERA with 40 strikeouts across 32 2/3 innings pitched. Danner was released by the Reds organization on July 17.

=== Los Angeles Angels ===
On August 10, 2026, Danner signed a minor league contract with the Los Angeles Angels. He made seven appearances for the Triple–A Salt Lake Bees, recording a 5.14 ERA with four strikeouts over seven innings of relief. Danner was released by the Angels organization on September 22.

=== Washington Nationals ===
On November 18, 2026, Danner signed a minor league contract with the Washington Nationals.

== Personal life ==
Danner married his wife Lucie in November 2024.

Danner's childhood best friend and former Little League and high school teammate is MLB player Nick Pratto.
