= Mason McCoy =

American baseball player (born 1995)

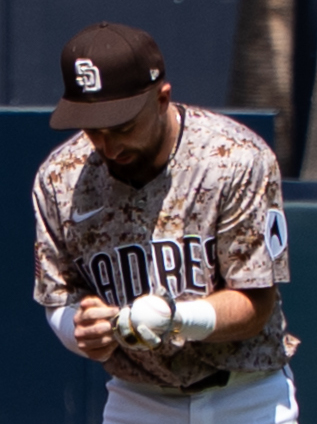
- McCoy with the San Diego Padres in 2025

San Diego Padres – No. 18
- Infielder
- Born: March 31, 1995 (age 31); Peoria, Illinois, U.S.
- Bats: Right Throws: Right

MLB debut
- August 30, 2023, for the Toronto Blue Jays

MLB statistics (through 2025 season)
- Batting average: .181
- Home runs: 0
- Runs batted in: 4
- Stats at Baseball Reference

Teams
- Toronto Blue Jays (2023); San Diego Padres (2024–2025)

Mason Steven McCoy (born March 31, 1995) is an American professional baseball infielder for the San Diego Padres of Major League Baseball (MLB). He debuted in MLB for the Toronto Blue Jays in 2023.

== Career ==
=== Amateur career ===
McCoy graduated from Washington Community High School in Washington, Illinois, in 2013. He attended Illinois Central College, where he played college baseball. He played summer baseball for the La Crosse Loggers of the Northwoods League in 2015 and was named the league's most valuable player. He transferred to the University of Iowa to play for the Iowa Hawkeyes. McCoy went undrafted in the 2016 MLB draft and returned to Iowa for his senior year, where he was a team captain and hit .328 with five home runs and 34 runs batted in (RBI).

=== Baltimore Orioles ===
The Baltimore Orioles selected McCoy in the sixth round, with the 188th overall selection, of the 2017 Major League Baseball draft. He made his professional debut with the Low-A Aberdeen IronBirds, playing in 53 games and batting .301/.383/.409 with one home run and 29 RBI.

McCoy spent the 2018 season with the Single-A Delmarva Shorebirds, playing in 124 games and hitting .266/.332/.369 with 4 home runs, 47 RBI, and 13 stolen bases. McCoy split the 2019 season between the High-A Frederick Keys and Double-A Bowie Baysox. In 132 games, he hit a combined .290/.345/.378 with 4 home runs, 48 RBI, and 13 stolen bases.

McCoy did not play in a game in 2020 due to the cancellation of the minor league season because of the COVID-19 pandemic. He returned to action in 2021 with the Triple-A Norfolk Tides. Playing in 112 games, he batted .221/.288/.368 with 9 home runs, 43 RBI, and 13 stolen bases.

=== Seattle Mariners ===
On April 7, 2022, the Orioles traded McCoy to the Seattle Mariners for cash considerations. He spent the season with the Triple-A Tacoma Rainiers, playing in 124 games and hitting .256/.332/.473 with career-highs in home runs (21), RBI (63), and stolen bases (22). In addition, McCoy set the record for highest fielding percentage ever for a Tacoma shortstop, making only 6 errors all season en route to a .986 fielding percentage.

McCoy returned to Tacoma to begin the 2023 season. In 87 games, he hit .234/.330/.407 with 11 home runs, 55 RBI, and 20 stolen bases.

=== Toronto Blue Jays ===
On July 26, 2023, the Mariners traded McCoy to the Toronto Blue Jays in exchange for Trent Thornton. He was subsequently assigned to the Triple-A Buffalo Bisons, where he put up a .572 OPS in 21 games. On August 29, McCoy was selected to the 40-man roster and promoted to the major leagues for the first time following an injury to Bo Bichette. McCoy made his debut a day later on August 30, pinch hitting for Ernie Clement. In 6 games for Toronto, he appeared mostly as a defensive replacement or pinch runner, and struck out in his only at-bat. On September 20, McCoy was designated for assignment following the promotion of Cam Eden. He cleared waivers and was sent outright to Buffalo on September 22.

=== San Diego Padres ===
On November 19, 2023, McCoy signed a minor league contract with the San Diego Padres that included an invitation to spring training. He began the season with the El Paso Chihuahuas, playing in 108 games and slashing .260/.329/.382 with five home runs, 50 RBI, and 25 stolen bases. On August 21, 2024, the Padres selected McCoy's contract, adding him to their active roster. He made his first start for the Padres the next day. In 19 games for San Diego, he slashed .204/.278/.245 with three RBI and one stolen base. On November 22, the Padres non-tendered McCoy, making him a free agent.

On December 6, 2024, McCoy re-signed with the Padres organization on a minor league contract. On March 22, 2025, the Padres selected McCoy's contract and subsequently optioned him to Triple-A El Paso. He was recalled on April 21, following Luis Arráez's concussion. He played in four games, starting once and striking out in four of five plate appearances, before going on the injured list with a dislocated finger on April 29. He returned to Triple-A on May 20.

McCoy was optioned to Triple-A El Paso to begin the 2026 season.

== Personal life ==
McCoy has two younger siblings. In high school, he also won all-conference honors playing basketball and soccer.
