= René Pinto (baseball) =

Venezuelan baseball player (born 1996)

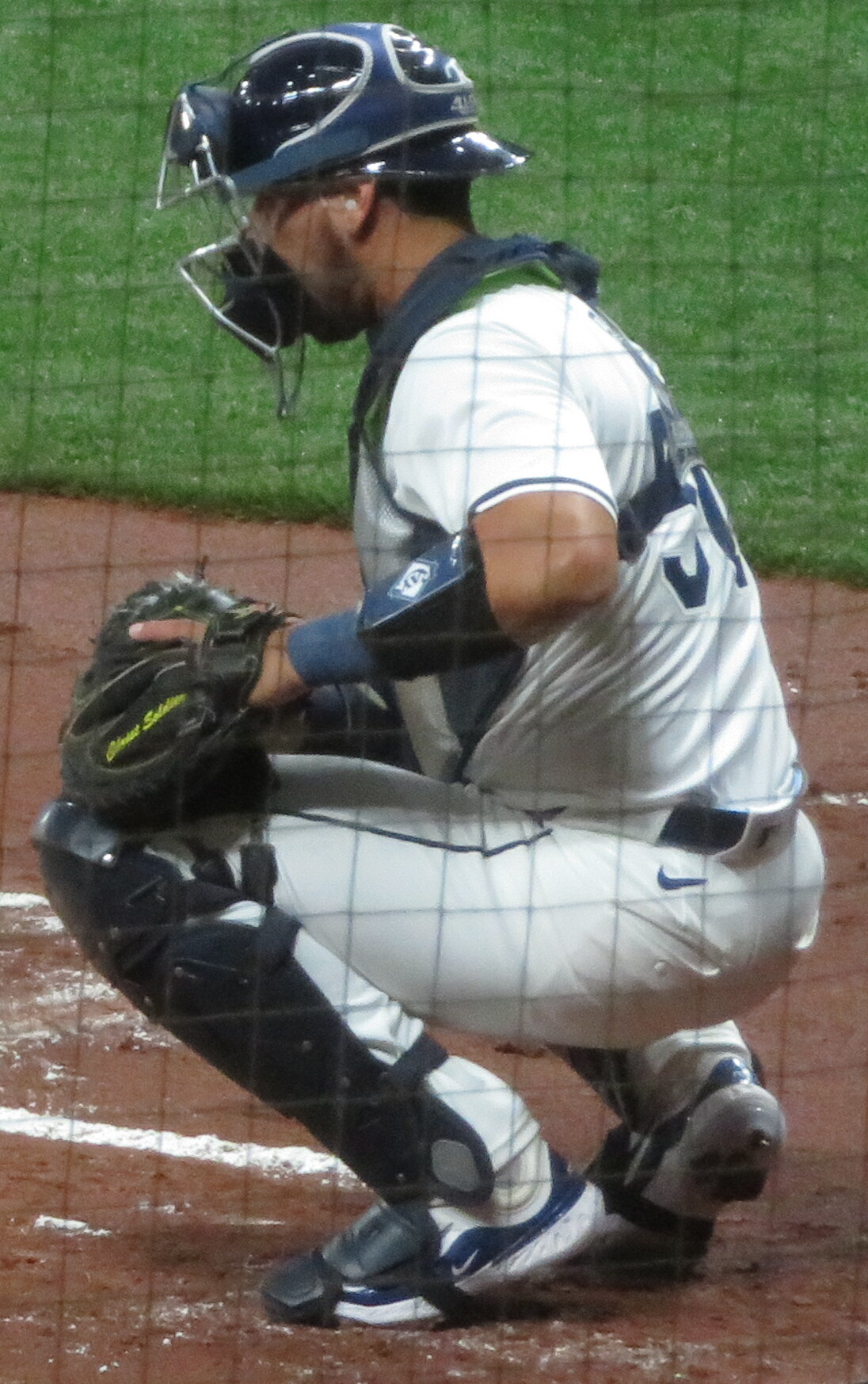
- Pinto with the Tampa Bay Rays

Long Island Ducks – No. 27
- Catcher
- Born: November 2, 1996 (age 29); Maracay, Venezuela
- Bats: Right Throws: Right

MLB debut
- April 26, 2022, for the Tampa Bay Rays

MLB statistics (through 2024 season)
- Batting average: .231
- Home runs: 10
- Runs batted in: 32
- Stats at Baseball Reference

Teams
- Tampa Bay Rays (2022–2024)

René Rafael Pinto Escobar (born November 2, 1996) is a Venezuelan professional baseball catcher for the Long Island Ducks of the Atlantic League of Professional Baseball. He has previously played in Major League Baseball (MLB) for the Tampa Bay Rays.

== Career ==
=== Tampa Bay Rays ===
Pinto signed with the Tampa Bay Rays as an international free agent on October 1, 2013. Pinto spent the 2014 and 2015 seasons with the Venezuelan Summer League Rays; hitting .264/.318/.347 with one home run and 11 RBI in 40 games and .323/.379/.552 with six home runs and 38 RBI in 2015. He split the 2016 season between the rookie–level Gulf Coast League Rays and the rookie–level Princeton Rays, hitting a combined .262/.304/.483 with eight home runs and 28 RBI. Pinto split the 2017 season between the GCL and the Single–A Bowling Green Hot Rods, hitting a combined .290/.339/.396 with three home runs and 39 RBI. He spent the 2018 season with the High–A Charlotte Stone Crabs, hitting .301/.353/.407 with one home run and 38 RBI.

Pinto spent the 2019 season with the Double–A Montgomery Biscuits, hitting .235/.303/.354 with five home runs and 30 RBI. He did not play in 2020 due to the cancellation of the Minor League Baseball season because of the COVID-19 pandemic. Pinto elected free agency on November 2, 2020, and re–signed with the organization on a minor league contract on November 16. Pinto split the 2021 season between Montgomery and the Durham Bulls, hitting a combined .274/.325/.500/.825 with 20 home runs and 60 RBI.

On November 7, 2021, Tampa Bay selected Pinto's contract to the 40-man roster. On April 22, 2022, Pinto was added to the Rays roster as a COVID-19 replacement for Francisco Mejía. He made his MLB debut on April 26 against the Seattle Mariners. After Mike Zunino left the game with a left biceps injury, Pinto replaced him. In the same game, Pinto collected his first major league hit, a two-run home run off of Mariners reliever Matt Koch. He became the 10th player in Rays history to get a home run as his first MLB hit. He appeared in 25 games for Tampa Bay in his rookie campaign, hitting .213/.241/.325 with 2 home runs and 10 RBI.

Pinto was optioned to Triple-A Durham to begin the 2023 season. In 39 appearances for the Rays in 2023, he batted .252/.267/.456 with six home runs and 16 RBI.

Pinto played in 19 games for Tampa Bay during the 2024 season, slashing .214/.292/.429 with two home runs and six RBI.

=== Arizona Diamondbacks ===
On November 4, 2024, Pinto was claimed off waivers by the Baltimore Orioles. He was designated for assignment following the signing of Charlie Morton on January 3, 2025. Pinto was claimed off waivers by the Arizona Diamondbacks on January 10. He was designated for assignment by the Diamondbacks on March 26. Pinto cleared waivers and was sent outright to the Triple-A Reno Aces on March 29. In 54 appearances for Reno, he batted .268/.324/.517 with 11 home runs, 42 RBI, and two stolen bases. Pinto was released by the Diamondbacks organization on August 27.

=== Toronto Blue Jays ===
On September 1, 2025, Pinto signed a minor league contract with the Toronto Blue Jays organization. He made eight appearances for the Triple-A Buffalo Bisons, going 6-for-28 (.214) with one home run and five RBI. Pinto elected free agency following the season on November 6.

=== Philadelphia Phillies ===
On January 6, 2026, Pinto signed a minor league contract with the Philadelphia Phillies. In 20 games split between the High-A Jersey Shore BlueClaws and Triple-A Lehigh Valley IronPigs, he batted .157/.189/.257 with one home run and five RBI. Pinto was released by the Phillies organization on July 5.

=== Long Island Ducks ===
On July 18, 2026, Pinto signed with the Long Island Ducks of the Atlantic League of Professional Baseball.
