= Jay Jackson (baseball) =

American baseball player (born 1987)

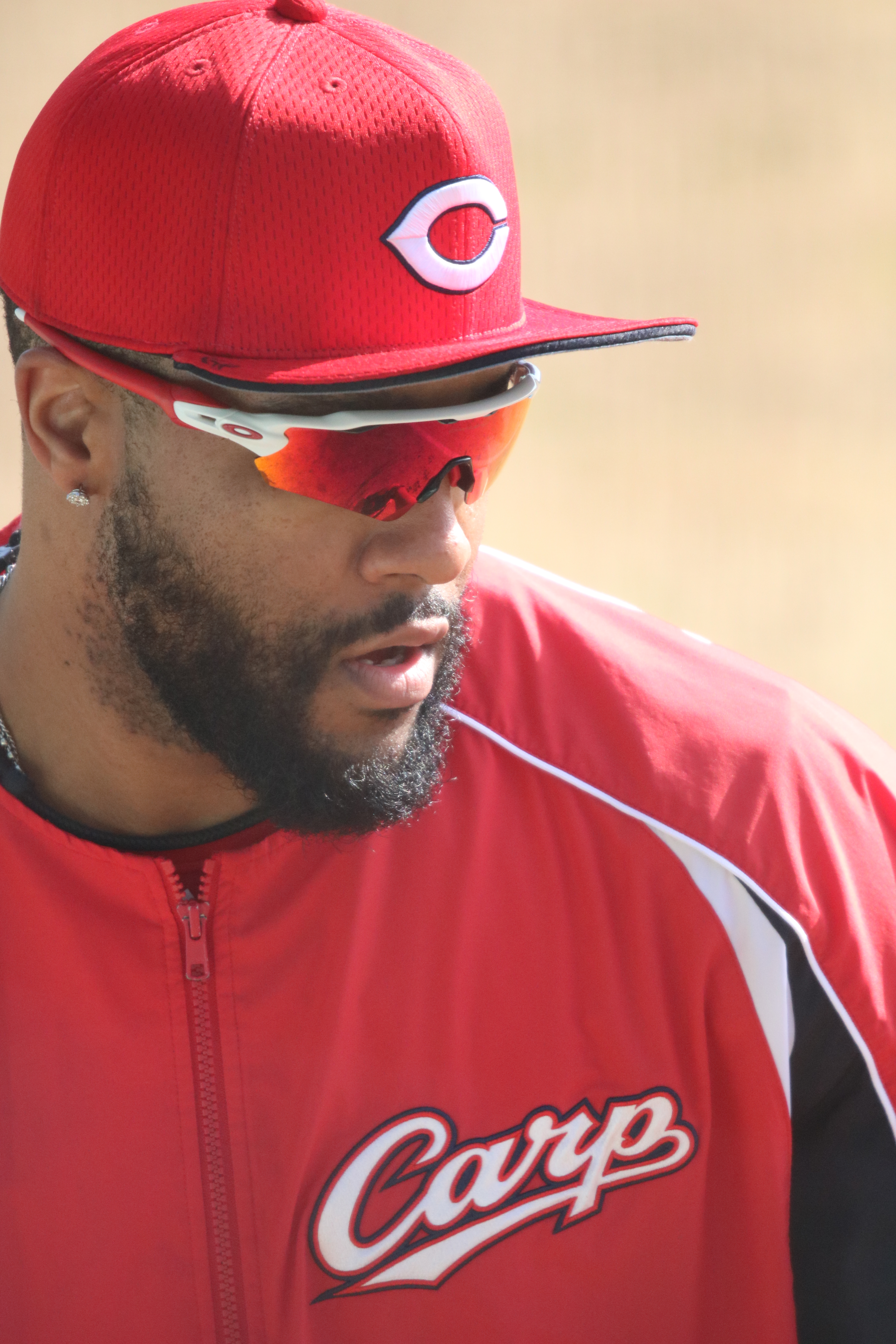
- Jackson with the Hiroshima Toyo Carp
- Pitcher
- Born: October 27, 1987 (age 38); Greenville, South Carolina, U.S.
- Batted: Right Threw: Right

Professional debut
- MLB: September 14, 2015, for the San Diego Padres
- NPB: March 26, 2016, for the Hiroshima Toyo Carp

Last appearance
- MLB: June 20, 2024, for the Minnesota Twins
- NPB: July 7, 2020, for the Chiba Lotte Marines

MLB statistics
- Win–loss record: 7–4
- Earned run average: 4.33
- Strikeouts: 136

NPB statistics
- Win–loss record: 10–8
- Earned run average: 2.16
- Strikeouts: 204
- Stats at Baseball Reference

Teams
- San Diego Padres (2015); Hiroshima Toyo Carp (2016–2018); Milwaukee Brewers (2019); Chiba Lotte Marines (2020); San Francisco Giants (2021); Atlanta Braves (2022); Toronto Blue Jays (2023); Minnesota Twins (2024)

Randy "Jay" Jackson (born October 27, 1987) is an American former professional baseball pitcher. He played in Major League Baseball (MLB) for the San Diego Padres, Milwaukee Brewers, San Francisco Giants, Atlanta Braves, Toronto Blue Jays, and Minnesota Twins. He also played in Nippon Professional Baseball (NPB) for the Hiroshima Toyo Carp and Chiba Lotte Marines. Jackson played college baseball at Furman University. He was drafted by the Chicago Cubs in the ninth round of the 2008 Major League Baseball draft.

== Playing career ==
Jackson attended Christ Church Episcopal School in Greenville, South Carolina, and Furman University.

=== Chicago Cubs ===
Jackson was drafted by the Chicago Cubs in the ninth round, 281st overall, of the 2008 Major League Baseball draft. He made his professional debut with the Low-A Boise Hawks and also played for the Single-A Peoria Chiefs and the High-A Daytona Cubs, posting a cumulative 2.88 ERA in 13 games. Jackson split 2009 between Daytona, the Double-A Tennessee Smokies, and the Triple-A Iowa Cubs, pitching to an 8–7 record and 2.98 ERA in 24 games between the three teams. The following season, Jackson returned to Iowa and posted an 11–8 record and 4.63 ERA with 119 strikeouts in 157.1 innings of work. In 2011, Jackson again played with Iowa, registering an 8–14 record and 5.34 ERA in 26 appearances. In 2012, Jackson returned to Iowa for a fourth straight year, but struggled to a 3–7 record and 6.57 ERA in 37 appearances with the team. On April 4, 2013, Jackson was released by the Cubs organization.

=== Miami Marlins ===
On April 9, 2013, Jackson signed a minor league contract with the Miami Marlins organization. He split the year between the Double-A Jacksonville Suns and the Triple-A New Orleans Zephyrs, pitching to a 4–7 record and 3.53 ERA with 93 strikeouts in 104 2/3 innings pitched between the two affiliates. Jackson elected free agency following the season on November 4.

=== Pittsburgh Pirates ===
On November 20, 2013, Jackson signed a minor league contract with the Pittsburgh Pirates that included an invitation to spring training. He began the 2014 season with the Triple-A Indianapolis Indians, logging a 5–4 record and 4.89 ERA in 25 appearances.

=== Milwaukee Brewers ===
On August 7, 2014, Jackson was traded to the Milwaukee Brewers for cash. He finished the year with the Triple-A Nashville Sounds, recording a 5.06 ERA in six starts. On November 4, he elected free agency.

=== San Diego Padres ===
On January 26, 2015, Jackson signed a minor league contract with the San Diego Padres that included an invitation to spring training. He began the year with the Double-A San Antonio Missions before being promoted to the Triple-A El Paso Chihuahuas. On September 14, Jackson was selected to the 40-man roster and promoted to the major leagues for the first time. He made his MLB debut that day, pitching two-thirds of an inning against the Arizona Diamondbacks and allowing two earned runs. He finished the year with a 6.23 ERA in six major league games. Jackson was released by the Padres on December 26 so he could pursue an opportunity in Japan.

=== Hiroshima Toyo Carp ===
On December 26, 2015, Jackson signed with the Hiroshima Toyo Carp of Nippon Professional Baseball (NPB) for the 2016 season. Jackson made 67 appearances for Hiroshima in 2016, posting a 5–4 record and 1.71 ERA with 89 strikeouts in 68 1/3 innings of work. The following year, Jackson pitched to a 2.76 ERA in 48 appearances for the team. In 2018 with the Carp, Jackson recorded a 2.76 ERA with 48 strikeouts in 45 2/3 innings pitched.

=== Milwaukee Brewers (second stint) ===
On February 15, 2019, Jackson signed a minor league deal with the Milwaukee Brewers organization that included an invitation to spring training. He was assigned to the Triple-A San Antonio Missions to begin the year. Jackson had his contract selected to the major leagues on April 29. Jackson allowed 5 runs in 2 1/3 innings before being designated for assignment on May 5 following the promotion of Burch Smith. He was outrighted to San Antonio on May 8. With San Antonio, he was selected in the Triple-A All-Star team. The Brewers selected Jackson's contract back to the active roster on July 13. Jackson finished the year with a stellar 1.33 ERA in 34 appearances with San Antonio and a 4.45 ERA in 28 games with Milwaukee. He became a free agent after the season.

=== Chiba Lotte Marines ===
On December 4, 2019, Jackson signed with the Chiba Lotte Marines of Nippon Professional Baseball (NPB). In seven games for Lotte in 2020, Jackson registered a 3.86 ERA with 12 strikeouts in 7 innings. On July 10, 2020, Jackson was arrested on suspicion of cannabis possession and was released by the Marines the same day.

=== Cincinnati Reds ===
On August 28, 2020, the Cincinnati Reds signed Jackson to a minor league contract and added him to their 60-man player pool. Jackson did not play in a game for the Reds organization due to the cancellation of the minor league season because of the COVID-19 pandemic. He became a free agent on November 2.

=== San Francisco Giants ===
On January 8, 2021, Jackson signed a minor league contract with the San Francisco Giants. He was assigned to the Triple-A Sacramento River Cats to begin the year and pitched 11 scoreless innings with the team. On July 16, Jackson was selected to the Giants' active roster. In the regular season for the Giants, Jackson was 2–1 with a 3.74 ERA. In 23 games (one start), he pitched 21 2/3 innings striking out 28 batters, and averaged 6.2 hits, 5.0 walks, and 11.2 strikeouts per 9 innings. On November 19, Jackson was designated for assignment by the Giants.

=== Atlanta Braves ===
On November 22, 2021, Jackson was traded to the Atlanta Braves for cash and a player to be named later or additional cash considerations. On March 18, 2022, Jackson was placed on the 60-day injured list with a lat strain. He was activated on July 2, and optioned to the Triple-A Gwinnett Stripers. He made only two appearances for Atlanta, tossing 1 1/3 scoreless innings. On September 16, Jackson was designated for assignment. He cleared waivers and was sent outright to Triple–A Gwinnett on September 20. He elected free agency on November 6.

=== Toronto Blue Jays ===
On January 11, 2023, Jackson signed a minor league contract with the Toronto Blue Jays. Jackson was released by the organization on March 25. On March 28, Jackson re-signed with the Blue Jays on a split major league contract. In 25 appearances for Toronto, he registered a 2.12 ERA with 27 strikeouts in 29 2/3 innings pitched. On October 1, Jackson was designated for assignment following the promotion of Wes Parsons. He cleared waivers and was sent outright to the Triple–A Buffalo Bisons on October 3. He elected free agency on November 2.

=== Minnesota Twins ===
On February 7, 2024, Jackson signed a one–year, $1.5 million contract with the Minnesota Twins. In 17 games for Minnesota, he struggled to a 6.85 ERA with 23 strikeouts across 22 1/3 innings pitched. On May 19, Jackson was designated for assignment by the Twins. He cleared waivers and was sent outright to the Triple–A St. Paul Saints on May 26. On June 12, the Twins selected Jackson's contract, adding him back to their active roster. He made two more appearances for Minnesota before he was designated for assignment once more on June 20. Jackson cleared waivers and was again outrighted to St. Paul on June 23. He was released by the Twins on July 25.

=== Bravos de León ===
On February 28, 2025, Jackson signed with the Bravos de León of the Mexican League. However, on March 29, Jackson retired from professional baseball.

== Coaching career ==
On April 8, 2025, Jackson was hired to serve as the pitching coach for the West Virginia Black Bears of the MLB Draft League.

== Personal life ==
Jackson has two sons. His youngest child was born prematurely in July 2023 and remained in the neonatal intensive care unit for 166 days before being discharged.
