= José López (pitcher) =

Dominican baseball player (born 1999)

Charleston Dirty Birds – No. 41
- Pitcher
- Born: February 15, 1999 (age 27); Santo Domingo, Dominican Republic
- Bats: Left Throws: Left

MLB debut
- June 10, 2023, for the Tampa Bay Rays

MLB statistics (through 2023 season)
- Win–loss record: 0–0
- Earned run average: 4.50
- Strikeouts: 2
- Stats at Baseball Reference

Teams
- Tampa Bay Rays (2023)

José Alexander López (born February 15, 1999) is a Dominican professional baseball pitcher for the Charleston Dirty Birds of the Atlantic League of Professional Baseball. He has previously played in Major League Baseball (MLB) for the Tampa Bay Rays.

== Career ==
=== Tampa Bay Rays ===
On October 28, 2016, López signed with the Tampa Bay Rays as an international free agent. He made his professional debut with the Dominican Summer League Rays in 2017, posting a 3.08 ERA in 15 games. López spent the 2018 season with the rookie–level Gulf Coast League Rays, recording a 2.27 ERA with 36 strikeouts across 43 1/3 innings pitched.

López spent the 2019 campaign with the rookie–level Princeton Rays, registering a 4–3 record and 2.54 ERA with 55 strikeouts over 12 starts. He did not play in a game in 2020 due to the cancellation of the minor league season because of the COVID-19 pandemic. López returned to action in 2021 with the Single–A Charleston RiverDogs and High–A Bowling Green Hot Rods. In 27 games (10 starts) between the two affiliates, he accumulated a 6–7 record and 5.06 ERA with 83 strikeouts across 74 2/3 innings.

López spent the majority of the 2022 campaign with the Double–A Montgomery Biscuits, compiling an 8–3 record and 2.60 ERA with 91 strikeouts and 9 saves. On December 7, 2022, the San Diego Padres selected López from the Rays in the Rule 5 draft at the Winter Meetings. On March 26, 2023, López was returned to the Rays after struggling to a 9.00 ERA across seven spring training appearances.

He was assigned to the Triple–A Durham Bulls to begin the 2023 season, where he posted a 5.19 ERA with 27 strikeouts and 2 saves in 23 appearances. On June 10, 2023. López was selected to the 40-man roster and promoted to the major leagues for the first time. He made his MLB debut the same day, allowing one run on three hits in two innings of work against the Texas Rangers. On July 7, López was designated for assignment following the promotion of Elvin Rodríguez. After clearing waivers, he was released by the Rays on July 10. On July 21, López re–signed with the Rays on a minor league contract. He elected free agency following the season on November 6.

=== Hagerstown Flying Boxcars ===
On July 1, 2024, López signed with the Hagerstown Flying Boxcars of the Atlantic League of Professional Baseball. In 18 games for Hagerstown, López compiled a 2.16 ERA with 21 strikeouts over 16 2/3 innings pitched.

=== Lake Country DockHounds ===
On August 23, 2024, López was traded to the Lake Country DockHounds of the American Association of Professional Baseball in exchange for a player to be named later. In six appearances for Lake Country, he compiled an 0–1 record and 5.06 ERA with seven strikeouts and one saves across 5 1/3 innings of relief. López became a free agent following the season.

=== York Revolution ===
On June 19, 2026, after a year of inactivity, López signed with the York Revolution of the Atlantic League of Professional Baseball. He was released on July 24.

=== Charleston Dirty Birds ===
On July 29, 2026, López signed with the Charleston Dirty Birds of the Atlantic League of Professional Baseball.

== See also ==
- Rule 5 draft results
