= Trent Thornton =

American baseball player (born 1993)

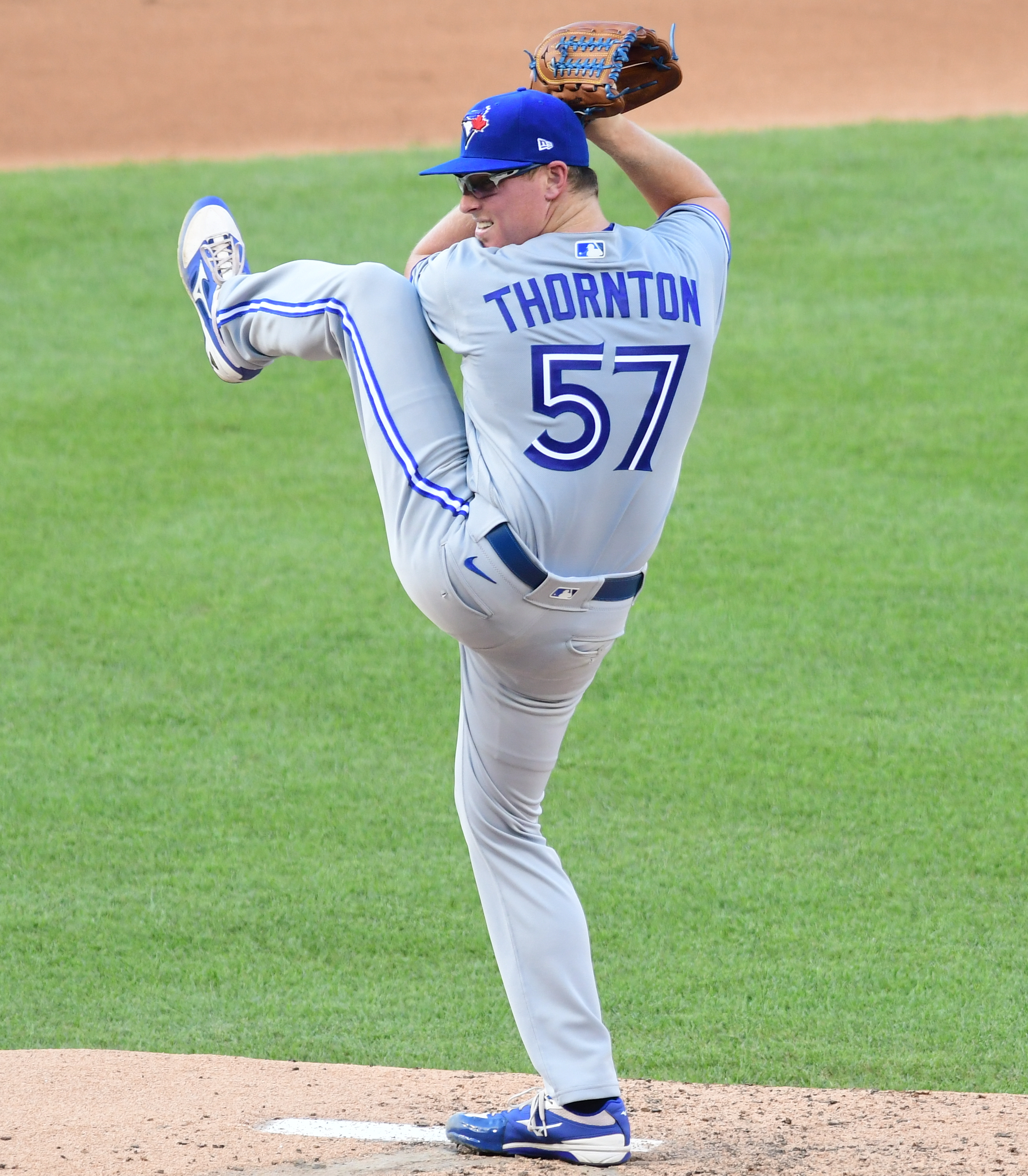
- Thornton with the Toronto Blue Jays in 2020

Free agent
- Pitcher
- Born: September 30, 1993 (age 33); Charlotte, North Carolina, U.S.
- Bats: Right Throws: Right

MLB debut
- March 31, 2019, for the Toronto Blue Jays

MLB statistics (through 2026 season)
- Win–loss record: 19–24
- Earned run average: 4.27
- Strikeouts: 410
- Stats at Baseball Reference

Teams
- Toronto Blue Jays (2019–2023); Seattle Mariners (2023–2025); Chicago Cubs (2026)

Trent Edward Thornton (born September 30, 1993) is an American professional baseball pitcherwho is a free agent. He has played in Major League Baseball (MLB) for the Toronto Blue Jays, Seattle Mariners, and Chicago Cubs. He debuted in MLB with Toronto in 2019 as a starting pitcher before moving to a relief role beginning in 2021.

== Amateur career ==
Thornton graduated from Ardrey Kell High School in Charlotte, North Carolina and enrolled at the University of North Carolina to play college baseball for the Tar Heels. As a freshman, he had a 12–1 win–loss record and 8 saves with a 1.37 earned run average (ERA) in 29 games, earning freshman All-American honors. As a sophomore in 2014, he went 7–4 with a 2.73 ERA in 16 games, including 14 starts. He was named to the All-Atlantic Coast Conference second-team. He then played collegiate summer baseball with the Orleans Firebirds of the Cape Cod Baseball League. As a junior in 2015, he went 3–7 with a 5.08 ERA in 28 games, including four starts.

== Professional career ==
=== Houston Astros ===
Thorton was selected by the Houston Astros in the fifth round of the 2015 Major League Baseball draft, and he received a $325,000 signing bonus. He made his professional debut that summer with the Low-A Tri-City Valley Cats, going 4–0 with a 3.27 ERA in 12 starts and 3 relief appearances. He began the 2016 season with the High-A Lancaster JetHawks and was promoted in July to the Double-A Corpus Christi Hooks. He had a combined 10–5 record with a 3.52 ERA in 24 appearances, 21 of them starts. In 2017, he returned to Corpus Christi for the first three weeks of the season, then moved up to Triple-A Fresno Grizzlies. He pitched to a 9–6 record and a 5.21 ERA in 25 games, 23 starts, for the two clubs. He spent 2018 with Fresno. He was named the Pacific Coast League Pitcher of the Week for June 11–17 after pitching 7 2/3 scoreless innings in which he allowed only one hit, given up with two outs in the eighth inning, and two walks. In 24 games (22 starts) for the Grizzlies, Thornton went 9–8 with a 4.42 ERA. After the regular season, he pitched for the Scottsdale Scorpions in the Arizona Fall League.

=== Toronto Blue Jays ===
On November 17, 2018, Houston traded Thornton to the Toronto Blue Jays for utility player Aledmys Díaz. The Blue Jays added Thornton to their 40-man roster a few days later to protect him from the Rule 5 draft. The Blue Jays announced that Thornton had made the Opening Day roster on March 26, 2019. He made his MLB debut on March 31, starting against the Detroit Tigers. He pitched five shutout innings, and his eight strikeouts was a franchise record for strikeouts in an MLB debut (surpassed by Trey Yesavage in 2025). Thornton earned his first career win on May 14 against the San Francisco Giants, allowing two runs and striking out seven in 5 2/3 innings. He also hit two singles, the only hits of his MLB career, and scored two runs in a 7–3 win. Thornton's rookie season ended with a 6–9 record and 4.84 ERA in 29 starts, the most in his big league career, and 3 bullpen outings. He led the Jays in starts, innings pitched, and strikeouts. He lowered his ERA below 5.00 in the final month of the season, crediting his development in part to rotation-mates Clay Buccholz and Clayton Richard. Buccholz taught Thornton new grips to his curveball and changeups.

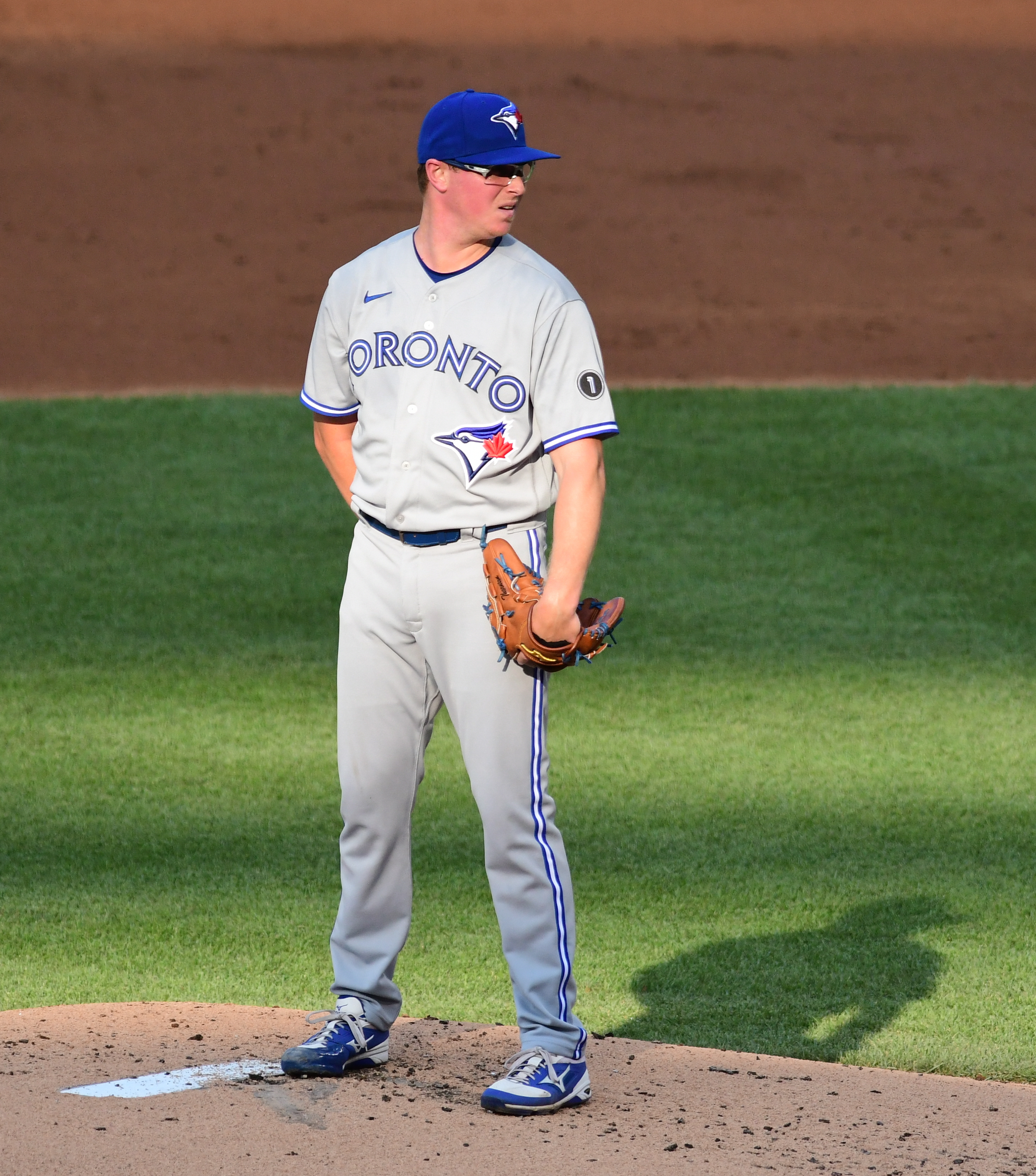
Thornton making his first start in 2020.

Thornton started three games for the 2020 Toronto Blue Jays, with no decisions, an 11.12 ERA, and six strikeouts in 5 2/3 innings. Elbow problems doomed his season, as he started the shortened season on the injured list with right elbow inflammation, made one start on July 27, then went back on the shelf for several weeks. He returned to the mound on August 20 and made two more starts, not recording an out beyond the first inning in either of them. Thornton went back on the 10-day injured list on August 24, moving to the 60-day injured list three days later, due to elbow inflammation caused by bone spurs.

Thornton shifted to a relief role in 2021, initially due to injury concerns. He had a 1–3 record and 4.78 ERA with 52 strikeouts over 49 innings. He started the season strong, with a 2.49 ERA at the end of May, but spent the second half of the season shuttling between the majors and the Triple-A Buffalo Bisons, being optioned to Buffalo six different times from July 7 to September 13.

Thornton had a similar role for Toronto and Buffalo in 2022, making 32 appearances for Toronto, pitching to an 0–2 record and 4.11 ERA with 37 strikeouts in 46 innings. He was optioned to Buffalo four times from May through August, before being recalled on October 5 and pitching the final two innings of the Jays regular season finale, a win over the Baltimore Orioles. He was left off Toronto's roster for the Wild Card Series loss to the Seattle Mariners.

On January 13, 2023, Thornton signed a one-year, $1 million contract with the Blue Jays, avoiding salary arbitration. Thornton was optioned to Buffalo to begin the 2023 season. He was recalled to Toronto in June 19, then sent back to Buffalo on July 1. In 4 relief appearances for Toronto, he had a 1.69 ERA with 5 strikeouts in 5 1/3 innings. Thornton was designated for assignment by Toronto on July 21, 2023, following the acquisition of reliever Génesis Cabrera.

=== Seattle Mariners ===
On July 26, 2023, the Blue Jays traded Thornton to the Seattle Mariners for infielder Mason McCoy. The Mariners added Thornton to their roster on August 1, and he became a bullpen regular, pitching in 23 of the team's final 56 games. He had a 1–2 record for Seattle in 2023, with a 2.08 ERA and 21 strikeouts in 23 innings. With the Mariners, he began throwing a sweeper as his most common pitch and also threw more sliders.

Thornton and the Mariners agreed to a one-year $1.2 million contract on January 11, 2024. Thornton picked up his first MLB save on June 26, 2024, relieving closer Andrés Muñoz with no outs and the bases loaded, allowing just one inherited runner to score. He led Mariners pitchers in 2024 with 71 appearances, going 4–3 with a 3.61 ERA and 77 strikeouts in 72 1/3 innings. Thornton added one mile per hour to his fastball velocity, compared to 2023, and he was in the top 12 percent of pitchers at getting batters to swing at pitches thrown outside the strike zone.

Injuries again derailed Thornton's season in 2025. He suffered an appendicitis in early May, causing him to miss a month of the season. Thornton was removed from a June game in Chicago due to a heat-related illness. On July 31, he tore his left Achilles tendon while trying to cover first base, sending him back to the injured list and likely sidelining him for the rest of the season. After his injury, his team hung his jersey in the bullpen. Thornton had a 2–0 record, 4.68 ERA, and 32 strikeouts in 33 relief appearances prior to his injury. On November 21, 2025, he was non-tendered by Seattle and became a free agent.

=== Chicago Cubs ===
On January 21, 2026, Thornton signed a minor league contract with the Chicago Cubs that included an invitation to major league spring training. He was assigned to the Triple-A Iowa Cubs to begin the regular season, where he recorded a 3.18 ERA with five strikeouts across four appearances. On May 6, Chicago selected Thornton's contract, adding him to their active roster.

== Personal life ==
Several of Thornton's relatives played college football. His father Jeff played quarterback for the Indiana Hoosiers in 1988. His uncle Wes played defense for the Davidson Wildcats in the 1990s. His late grandfather Jerry played football and baseball for the Kansas Jayhawks in the 1960s.
