= Cam Eden =

American baseball player (born 1998)

- Outfielder
- Born: March 31, 1998 (age 28); Yuba City, California, U.S.
- Batted: Right Threw: Right

MLB debut
- September 21, 2023, for the Toronto Blue Jays

Last MLB appearance
- October 1, 2023, for the Toronto Blue Jays

MLB statistics
- Batting average: .167
- Home runs: 0
- Runs batted in: 0
- Stats at Baseball Reference

Teams
- Toronto Blue Jays (2023)

Cameron Ray Eden (born March 31, 1998) is an American former professional baseball outfielder. He played in Major League Baseball (MLB) for the Toronto Blue Jays in 2023.

== Amateur career ==
A native of Yuba City, California, Eden attended high school at Yuba City High School and would then attend the University of California, Berkeley and played college baseball for the California Golden Bears. In 2018, he played collegiate summer baseball with the Brewster Whitecaps of the Cape Cod Baseball League, and was named a league all-star.

== Professional career ==
=== Toronto Blue Jays ===
The Toronto Blue Jays selected Eden in the sixth round, with the 177th overall selection, of the 2019 Major League Baseball draft. He made his professional debut with the Low–A Vancouver Canadians, playing in 56 games and slashing .220/.292/.284 with one home run, 11 RBI, and 8 stolen bases. Eden did not play in a game in 2020 due to the cancellation of the minor league season because of the COVID-19 pandemic.

In 2021, Eden played with High–A Vancouver, hitting .274/.383/.402 with four home runs, 31 RBI, and 30 stolen bases across 48 games. Eden split the 2022 season between the Single–A Dunedin Blue Jays, High–A Vancouver, and Double–A New Hampshire Fisher Cats. In 94 total games, he hit a cumulative .233/.310/.408 with career–highs in home runs (12), RBI (41), and stolen bases (36).

Eden played for the Triple–A Buffalo Bisons in 2023, appearing in 131 games and batting .257/.354/.333 with three home runs, and career–highs in RBI (48), and stolen bases (53). On September 20, 2023, Eden was selected to the 40-man roster and promoted to the major leagues for the first time. The next day, he made his MLB debut as a pinch runner for Brandon Belt. Eden logged his first MLB hit off Jacob Lopez, a single, on October 1, against the Tampa Bay Rays. In 6 at–bats over 2 games, Eden logged a .167/.167/.167 slash line. Following the season on November 7, Eden was removed from the 40–man roster and sent outright to Triple–A.

Eden began the 2024 campaign with Buffalo, playing in 91 games and slashing .198/.299/.322 with seven home runs, 35 RBI, and 26 stolen bases.

=== New York Yankees ===
On August 9, 2024, the Blue Jays traded Eden to the New York Yankees in exchange for cash considerations. He made 23 appearances down the stretch for the Triple-A Scranton/Wilkes-Barre RailRiders, hitting .231/.286/.385 with one home run, three RBI, and seven stolen bases.

Eden split the 2025 season between the rookie-level Florida Complex League Yankees, Single-A Tampa Tarpons, Double-A Somerset Patriots, batting a cumulative .220/.287/.325 with one home run, 13 RBI, and 10 stolen bases. Eden was released by the Yankees organization on August 5, 2025.

=== Kansas City Monarchs ===
On March 10, 2026, Eden signed with the Kansas City Monarchs of the American Association of Professional Baseball. He did not make an appearance for the team prior to his release on May 11. Eden announced his retirement from professional baseball via an Instagram post on May 23.
