= Wes Parsons =

American baseball player (born 1992)

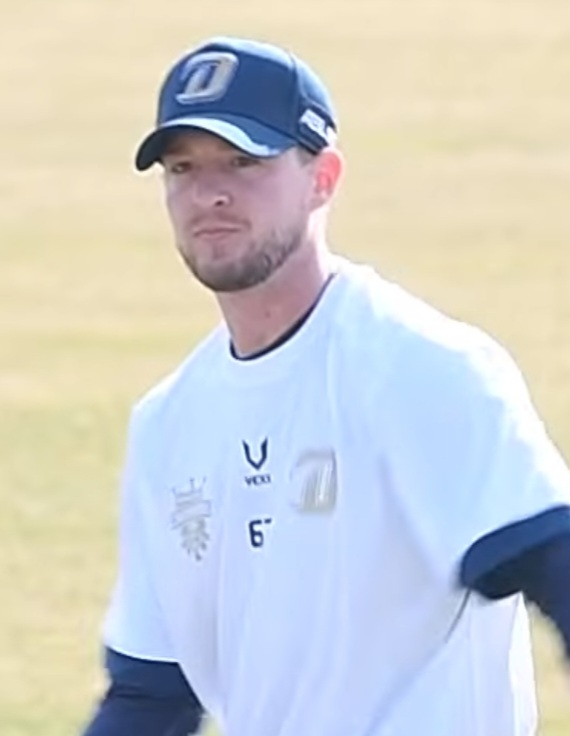
- Parsons with the NC Dinos in 2021
- Pitcher
- Born: September 6, 1992 (age 33); Clarksville, Tennessee, U.S.
- Batted: Right Threw: Right

Professional debut
- MLB: August 9, 2018, for the Atlanta Braves
- KBO: April 14, 2021, for the NC Dinos

Last appearance
- MLB: April 17, 2024, for the Cleveland Guardians
- KBO: May 14, 2022, for the NC Dinos

MLB statistics
- Win–loss record: 1–4
- Earned run average: 6.84
- Strikeouts: 39

KBO statistics
- Win–loss record: 5-10
- Earned run average: 3.68
- Strikeouts: 191
- Stats at Baseball Reference

Teams
- Atlanta Braves (2018–2019); Colorado Rockies (2019); NC Dinos (2021–2022); Toronto Blue Jays (2023–2024); Cleveland Guardians (2024)

Arthur Wesley Parsons (born September 6, 1992) is an American former professional baseball pitcher. He played in Major League Baseball (MLB) for the Atlanta Braves, Colorado Rockies, Toronto Blue Jays, and Cleveland Guardians, and in the KBO League for the NC Dinos.

== Career ==
=== Amateur career ===
After graduating from Clarksville High School in Clarksville, Tennessee, Parsons enrolled at Jackson State Community College. In 13 games started as a freshman, he had a 7–3 win–loss record with a 4.31 earned run average (ERA), striking out 60 in 79 1/3 innings pitched. After his freshman year, he played for the Thunder Bay Bordercats in the Northwoods League, a summer wooden bat league for top college prospects. After making the league's All-Star game, Parsons signed with the Atlanta Braves as an undrafted free agent in 2013.

=== Atlanta Braves ===
After signing, Parsons was assigned to the Rome Braves where he was 7–7 with a 2.63 ERA in 19 starts. In 2014 he pitched for the Lynchburg Hillcats, posting a 4–7 record and a 5.00 ERA in 23 starts. Parsons pitched in only five games in 2015 due to injury. He spent the majority of 2016 with the Carolina Mudcats where he was 0–2 with a 3.86 ERA in 16 games (seven starts), along with pitching one game for the Mississippi Braves. In 2017, Parsons pitched in 26 games (ten starts) for Mississippi where he compiled a 3–3 record and 2.71 ERA, and 8 1/3 innings for the Gwinnett Braves where he posted an 8.64 ERA. He began 2018 with Mississippi and was promoted to the Gwinnett Stripers in May after pitching to a 1–2 record and a 1.23 ERA over eight games (seven starts) for Mississippi.

Parsons was called up to the major leagues by Atlanta on June 27, 2018. In 14 appearances, with 13 being as a starter for Gwinnett prior to his callup, he had compiled a 3–1 record and a 2.83 ERA. Parsons returned to the International League without making a major league appearance. He was recalled back to the Braves on August 1 for his second call up in the 2018 season. He was then optioned back to Gwinnett the following day. Parsons received another promotion on August 7, and made his major league debut two days later against the Washington Nationals. Parsons made the Braves' Opening Day roster at the start of the 2019 season. He appeared in relief of Sean Newcomb on April 1, 2019, pitching one inning against the Chicago Cubs to earn his first major league victory. On August 16, 2019, Parsons was designated for assignment.

=== Colorado Rockies ===
On August 19, 2019, Parsons was claimed off waivers by the Colorado Rockies. In 15 appearances for the Rockies, he struggled to a 6.98 ERA with 14 strikeouts across 19 1/3 innings pitched. Parsons was designated for assignment following the signing of José Mujica on November 27. He was granted free agency on December 2, but later re–signed with the team on a minor league contract two days later.

Parsons did not play in a game in 2020 due to the cancellation of the minor league season because of the COVID-19 pandemic. He became a free agent on November 2, 2020.

=== NC Dinos ===
On January 11, 2021, Parsons signed a deal with the NC Dinos of the KBO League for $320K a year with a $80K signing bonus and a potential $200K coming from incentives. On April 14, 2021, Parsons made his KBO debut, striking out six and earning the win in a start against the SSG Landers. He finished the season with a 4–8 record, 3.72 ERA, and 148 strikeouts over 133.0 innings pitched.

On December 21, 2021, he re-signed with the Dinos on a one-year deal worth up to $650,000. Parsons started 8 games for the Dinos in 2022, registering a 1-2 record and 3.56 ERA with 43 strikeouts in 43.0 innings pitched. He was released on August 4, 2022.

=== Toronto Blue Jays ===
On May 8, 2023, Parsons signed a minor league contract with the Toronto Blue Jays organization. In 17 starts for the Triple–A Buffalo Bisons, he registered a 9–4 record and 4.55 ERA with 100 strikeouts in 85.0 innings of work. On October 1, the Blue Jays selected Parson's contract to the major league roster, enabling him to start the team's final regular season game. He proceeded to give up nine earned runs on 10 hits in four innings.

Parsons began the 2024 season with the Blue Jays, and was designated for assignment after allowing six runs in five innings pitched on April 5, 2024.

=== Cleveland Guardians ===
On April 10, 2024, Parsons was traded to the Cleveland Guardians in exchange for international bonus pool space. He made two scoreless appearances for Cleveland, striking out five batters in four innings of work. Parsons was designated for assignment by the Guardians on July 5. After clearing waivers, Parsons was released by the Guardians on July 11.
