= 2022 Boston Red Sox season =

Professional sports season in Major League Baseball

2022 Boston Red Sox
- League: American League
- Division: East
- Ballpark: Fenway Park
- City: Boston, Massachusetts
- Record: 78–84 (.481)
- Divisional place: 5th
- Owners: John W. Henry (Fenway Sports Group)
- President: Sam Kennedy
- Chief baseball officer: Chaim Bloom
- General manager: Brian O'Halloran
- Manager: Alex Cora
- Television: NESN: Dave O'Brien or Mike Monaco (play-by-play) with Dennis Eckersley, Tony Massarotti, Kevin Millar, and Kevin Youkilis (analyst rotation)
- Radio: WEEI-FM / Boston Red Sox Radio Network: Joe Castiglione, Will Flemming, and Sean McDonough (English); Nilson Pepen (Spanish)

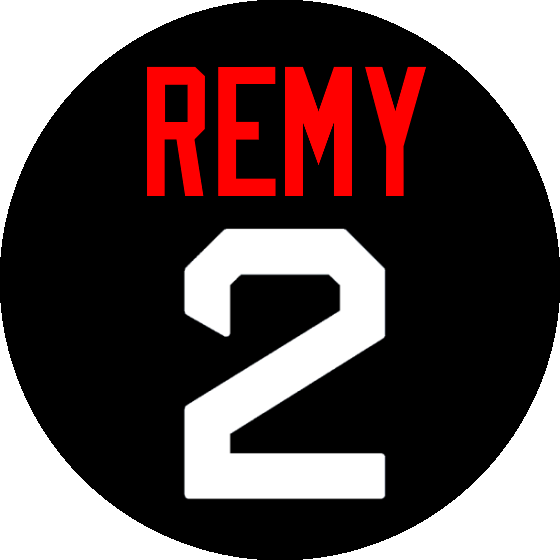
Patch worn in memory of Jerry Remy

The 2022 Boston Red Sox season was the 122nd season in Boston Red Sox franchise history, and their 111th season at Fenway Park. The team was led by Alex Cora, in the second season of his second stint as the team's manager. The team finished with a record of 78–84, in fifth and last place of the American League East division. Total attendance (at the team's 81 home games) was 2,625,089, an average of 32,409 per game.

== Season recap ==
The team's regular season was originally scheduled to open on March 31, with a home game against the Tampa Bay Rays, and conclude on October 2, with an away game against the Toronto Blue Jays. On December 2, 2021, Commissioner of Baseball Rob Manfred announced a lockout of players, following expiration of the collective bargaining agreement (CBA) between Major League Baseball (MLB) and the Major League Baseball Players Association (MLBPA). On March 10, 2022, MLB and the MLBPA agreed to a new collective bargaining agreement, thus ending the lockout. Opening Day was then scheduled for April 7 as an away game against the New York Yankees, but it was postponed to April 8 because of inclement weather. Boston's schedule was updated to conclude with a home game on October 5 against Tampa Bay. Although MLB previously announced that several series would be cancelled due to the lockout, the new CBA provided for a 162-game season, with originally canceled games to be made up via doubleheaders.

The Red Sox entered the 2022 season having reached the 2021 ALCS where they fell two wins short of appearing in the World Series. After compiling a 23–27 record through the end of May, the team went 20–6 during June, only to fall back under .500 in the second half of July. The Red Sox were decimated by key injuries and poor executive decisions, particularly failing to address a lack of offensive production at the first base position, which hampered the team. On July 22, the Red Sox suffered a historic 28–5 home loss to the Toronto Blue Jays. The 28 runs set a new Red Sox franchise record for the most runs ever allowed in a single game. Additionally, that loss along with two prior losses to the Yankees had a cumulative run differential of -47, the worst in a three-game stretch by any MLB team since 1900. The team went 8–19 during July, falling into last place in the AL East and ending the month with a 51–52 record approaching the MLB trade deadline of August 2.

The team made several trades prior to the trade deadline, resulting in Christian Vázquez, Jake Diekman, and prospect Jay Groome leaving the organization, while Tommy Pham, Eric Hosmer, and Reese McGuire joined the team. Shortly after, the Red Sox released Jackie Bradley Jr., who batted .210 with three home runs and 29 RBIs in 91 games. Five days later, on August 9, he signed with the Toronto Blue Jays. That same day, Chris Sale reportedly broke his right wrist while riding his bike to grab lunch and was ruled out for the rest of the season. On August 25, it was announced that James Paxton, who was already injured, suffered a type 2 latissimus dorsi tear the week before and was also ruled out for the rest of the season. On August 29, despite the team's playoff chances hanging in the balance, Red Sox president Sam Kennedy announced that both manager Alex Cora and general manager Chaim Bloom would return in 2023. The team had a losing record during August and ended the month at 63–68, still in last place in their division.

On September 3, the Red Sox announced that closer Tanner Houck would undergo a lumbar discectomy, ending his 2022 season. On September 19, they released Kevin Plawecki. He signed a major-league contract with the Texas Rangers two days later. On September 20, the Red Sox also announced that Garrett Whitlock would undergo arthroscopic hip surgery for a right hip impingement and would not return for the remainder of the season either.

On September 25, the Red Sox needed a win on Sunday Night Baseball to avoid a series sweep at Yankee Stadium and keep their playoff hopes alive. Only two runs were scored, both by the Yankees, and the game went into a rain delay after the sixth inning. After 90 minutes, the game was called, giving the Yankees a 2–0 win and the series sweep. With this loss, the Red Sox were officially eliminated from playoff contention. The following day, Boston sports radio producer Jimmy Stewart shared his thoughts on 98.5 The Sports Hub radio podcast The Baseball Hour with Tony Mazz, "Epic fail by this team. They should be competing for the American League Championship Series. The fact that they have such a high payroll, they mismanaged so many things, Garrett Whitlock amongst other things. Players underperforming, players asking for help, and then going on a long losing streak, this is an epic fail. This is one of the worst Red Sox seasons of the last twenty years."

With their 9–0 loss in Toronto on September 30, the Red Sox were assured of finishing a 162-game season with a losing record for the first time since 2015. The team went on to finish with a 78–84 record. Hall of Fame inductee and NESN color commentator Dennis Eckersley retired from broadcasting at the end of the season, having spent 50 years in professional baseball.

== Offseason ==
=== Lockout ===
The expiration of the league's collective bargaining agreement (CBA) with the Major League Baseball Players Association occurred on December 1, 2021, with no new agreement in place. As a result, the team owners voted unanimously to lockout the players, stopping all free agency and trades.

The parties came to an agreement on a new CBA on March 10, 2022.

=== Rule changes ===
Pursuant to the new CBA, several new rules were instituted for the 2022 season:

- Use of the designated hitter by the National League
- Expansion of the postseason from 10 to 12 teams
- Allowing teams to have their players wear advertising patches on uniforms and helmets

Additional changes were approved in late March:

- Expansion of teams' active rosters during April from 26 to 28 players (due to a shortened spring training)
- Starting any extra innings with a runner on second base
- Allowing pitchers who bat (e.g. Shohei Ohtani) to remain in the batting order after being removed as the pitcher
- Playing nine-inning doubleheader games (discontinuing the use of seven-inning doubleheader games)

October–December 2021

=== October ===
- On October 25, the team announced the dismissal of first base coach Tom Goodwin.
- On October 30, former Red Sox second baseman and longtime color commentator Jerry Remy died at age 68.

=== November ===
- On November 1, it was reported that hitting coach Tim Hyers declined the team's offer for 2022 and would not continue in his role.
- On November 3, five players elected to become free agents: Adam Ottavino, Hansel Robles, Eduardo Rodríguez, Danny Santana, and Travis Shaw.
- On November 4, Kyle Schwarber declined his side of a mutual option for 2022 and became a free agent.
- On November 5, the team claimed outfielder Tim Locastro off of waivers from the New York Yankees.
- On November 7, the team declined to exercise their 2022 options on Martín Pérez and Garrett Richards, making them free agents. The same day, the team did exercise its option on Christian Vázquez, and J. D. Martinez chose not to exercise his opt-out clause; both remain under contract with the team for the 2022 season. The team also issued a qualifying offer ($18.4 million for one year) to Eduardo Rodríguez, starting a 10-day window within which he could accept that offer, reach other contract terms with the team, or remain a free agent.
- On November 14, it was reported that Rodríguez declined the qualifying offer. He subsequently signed with the Detroit Tigers.
- On November 19, in advance of the Rule 5 draft, the Red Sox added four players their 40-man roster: infielder Jeter Downs and pitchers Brayan Bello, Kutter Crawford, and Josh Winckowski.
- On November 22, the ballot for the National Baseball Hall of Fame class of 2022 was announced. Multiple players who were with the Red Sox during their MLB careers were included: Curt Schilling (10th ballot, with Red Sox 2004–2007), Roger Clemens (10th, 1984–1996), Billy Wagner (7th, 2009), Manny Ramirez (6th, 2001–2008), Carl Crawford (1st, 2011–2012), David Ortiz (1st, 2003–2016), Jonathan Papelbon (1st, 2005–2011), Jake Peavy (1st, 2013–2014), and A. J. Pierzynski (1st, 2014).
- On November 27, the team signed pitcher Michael Wacha to a one-year contract, reportedly worth $7 million.
- On November 30, the team non-tendered Locastro, making him a free agent, and agreed to terms with pitcher Ryan Brasier on a one-year contract, reportedly worth $1.4 million.

=== December ===
- On December 1, the team:
  - Signed free agent pitchers Rich Hill and James Paxton.
  - Traded Hunter Renfroe to the Milwaukee Brewers in exchange for Jackie Bradley Jr. and minor-league infielders David Hamilton and Alex Binelas.
  - Agreed to terms with backup catcher Kevin Plawecki on a one-year contract for 2022, reportedly worth $2.25 million.
- On December 2, Commissioner of Baseball Rob Manfred announced a lockout of players, following expiration of the collective bargaining agreement (CBA) between the league and the Major League Baseball Players Association (MLBPA).
- On December 13, the team named Chad Tracy manager of the Worcester Red Sox.
- On December 20, the team named its coaching staff for the 2022 season. Existing coaches Ramón Vázquez and Peter Fatse were named the new first base coach and hitting coach, respectively. Luis Ortiz and Ben Rosenthal were added to the staff as assistant hitting coaches. Reed Gragnani was added to the staff as assistant hitting coordinator, and Andy Fox was added to the staff as major league field coordinator. Michael Brenly, who had been a bullpen catcher, was promoted to staff assistant.

January–April 2022

=== January ===
- On January 25, it was announced that David Ortiz, who played for the Red Sox from 2003 to 2016, was elected to the National Baseball Hall of Fame in his first year of eligibility, via 2022 Baseball Hall of Fame balloting.

=== February ===
- On February 18, MLB announced that the start of spring training would be delayed until at least March 5, due to the ongoing lockout.

=== March ===
- On March 1, with the lockout still unresolved, Commissioner Manfred announced that the regular season would not start on March 31 as originally planned; with the cancelation of the first two series of the season, teams were expected to play no more than 156 games.
- On March 10, MLB and the MLBPA reached tentative agreement on a new five-year collective bargaining agreement, which was officially ratified later that day. A full 162-game season was salvaged, with a delay of Opening Day to April 7, with originally cancelled games to be made up during the season.
- On March 6, the team signed pitchers Silvino Bracho and Darin Gillies to minor-league contracts with invitations to spring training.
- On March 11, the team signed pitcher Thomas Pannone to a minor-league contract.
- On March 15, the team signed pitcher Matt Strahm to a one-year contract. The team also placed Paxton on the 60-day injured list, as he continued his recovery from Tommy John surgery.
- On March 16, the team signed pitcher Jake Diekman to a two-year contract. The team also signed catcher Deivy Grullón to a minor-league contract.
- On March 19, the team re-signed relief pitcher Hansel Robles to a minor-league contract with an invitation to spring training.
- On March 22, the team came to agreement with five players on one-year contracts, thus avoiding arbitration: Christian Arroyo, Rafael Devers, Nick Pivetta, Josh Taylor, and Alex Verdugo. The team also claimed Kyle Tyler off waivers from the Los Angeles Angels; Hudson Potts was designated for assignment in a corresponding move.
- On March 23, the team announced the signing of infielder Trevor Story to a six-year contract. Jeisson Rosario was designated for assignment in a corresponding move; he was later claimed off of waivers by the New York Yankees.
- On March 24, the team claimed pitcher Ralph Garza Jr. off waivers from the Minnesota Twins. Kyle Tyler was designated for assignment in a corresponding move; he was later claimed off of waivers by the San Diego Padres.
- On March 30, the team signed pitcher Dan Altavilla, who underwent Tommy John surgery in June 2021.

=== April ===
- On April 4, the team placed pitcher Chris Sale on the 60-day injured list with a right rib stress fracture. In a corresponding move, the team added pitcher Tyler Danish to the 40-man roster.
- On April 7, the team designated Ralph Garza Jr. for assignment; he was claimed off of waivers by the Tampa Bay Rays. The team also selected the contracts of Hansel Robles and Travis Shaw from the Worcester Red Sox the bring the roster size to 28 players, as allowed by MLB to begin the 2022 season.

=== Spring training ===
The team's Grapefruit League schedule was originally scheduled to run from February 26 through March 29. The actual start of spring training was impacted by the lockout, as practices did not begin until March 13, with games spanning March 17 to April 5. The Red Sox compiled a spring training record of 11–8 (.579), scoring 91 runs while allowing 87.

== Regular season ==
The team's schedule was constructed by MLB as follows:

- 19 games × 4 AL East teams (76 games)
- 7 games × 6 AL teams (42 games)
- 6 games × 4 AL teams (24 games)
- 4 games × 2 NL teams (8 games)
- 3 games × 4 NL teams (12 games)

Total: 162 games

Red Sox' opponents detail
Opponent	Home	Away	Total
American League East
Baltimore Orioles	10	9	19
New York Yankees	9	10	19
Tampa Bay Rays	9	10	19
Toronto Blue Jays	9	10	19
American League Central
Chicago White Sox	3	3	6
Cleveland Guardians	4	3	7
Detroit Tigers	3	3	6
Kansas City Royals	3	4	7
Minnesota Twins	4	3	7
American League West
Houston Astros	3	3	6
Los Angeles Angels	3	4	7
Oakland Athletics	3	3	6
Seattle Mariners	4	3	7
Texas Rangers	4	3	7
National League Central
Chicago Cubs	–	3	3
Cincinnati Reds	2	2	4
Milwaukee Brewers	3	–	3
Pittsburgh Pirates	–	3	3
St. Louis Cardinals	3	–	3
National League East
Atlanta Braves	2	2	4
TOTAL	81	81	162

=== Opening Day lineup ===
The team opened the season with a 6–5 loss in 11 innings to the New York Yankees at Yankee Stadium on April 8.

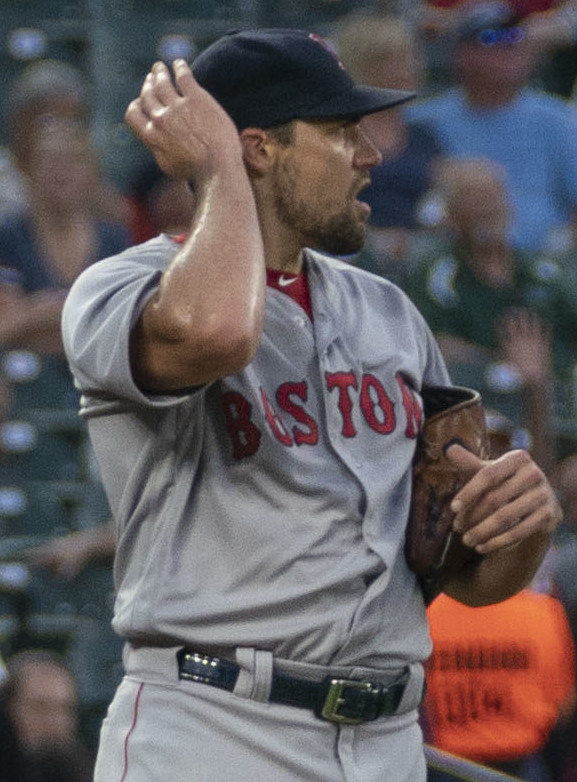
Opening Day starter Nathan Eovaldi

Order	No.	Player	Pos.
1	5	Kiké Hernández	CF
2	11	Rafael Devers	3B
3	2	Xander Bogaerts	SS
4	28	J. D. Martinez	DH
5	99	Alex Verdugo	LF
6	10	Trevor Story	2B
7	29	Bobby Dalbec	1B
8	19	Jackie Bradley Jr.	RF
9	7	Christian Vázquez	C
—	17	Nathan Eovaldi	P

April

=== April ===
April 8–April 10, at New York Yankees

Rain caused Boston's first game to be postponed from April 7 to April 8. Nathan Eovaldi started the opener, as he had done the prior two seasons, lasting five innings while allowing three runs on five hits and striking out seven batters. The Red Sox scored three runs in the top of the first inning, and the Yankees responded with two runs in the bottom of the inning, and later tied the game with a run in the bottom of the fourth. With the score tied at 4–4 after nine innings, the teams each scored a single run in the 10th inning, and New York won the game with a run in the bottom of the 11th inning. Kutter Crawford took the loss; Rafael Devers homered. New York won the second game of the series, 4–2. Boston starter Nick Pivetta took the loss after allowing four runs on four hits in 5 2/3 innings; Alex Verdugo homered. The Red Sox won the third and final game of the series, 4–3, although they were out-hit by the Yankees, 11–5. Starter Tanner Houck went 3 1/3 innings, allowing three runs on three hits. Crawford, the second of five relievers, got the win; Jake Diekman pitched the ninth inning and got the save. Bobby Dalbec homered.

Red Sox lost the series 1–2 (11–13 runs)

April 11–April 13, at Detroit Tigers

The Red Sox lost the opener of a three-game series in Detroit, 3–1. Tied 1–1 entering the bottom of the eighth inning, reliever Ryan Brasier allowed a two-run home run to Javier Báez. Austin Davis, who had allowed a single to the prior batter, took the loss. Starter Michael Wacha allowed one run on two hits in 4 1/3 innings in his Red Sox debut. Boston's lone run came on a J. D. Martinez homer in the fifth inning. Boston won the second game of the series, 5–3. Starter Rich Hill allowed all three Tiger runs in 4 1/3 innings on five hits. Rafael Devers went 3-for-5 with two RBIs and scored two runs. Reliever Garrett Whitlock pitched the sixth through ninth innings without allowing a hit and earned the win. Boston won the final game of the series, 9–7. After a six-run fourth inning, the Red Sox had a 6–1 lead, then led 9–2 after the top of the seventh before Detroit scored five late runs. Starter Nathan Eovaldi went five innings, allowing two runs on four hits, and earned the win. Hansel Robles recorded the final four outs to earn the save. Kiké Hernández homered.

Red Sox won the series 2–1 (15–13 runs)

April 15–April 18, vs. Minnesota Twins

Boston's home opener, the first contest of a four-game series against Minnesota, was held on Jackie Robinson Day. The Twins jumped out to an early 4–1 lead after two innings, extended to 6–1 after the fifth, en route to an 8–4 win over the Red Sox. Starter Nick Pivetta allowed four runs on five hits in two innings, taking the loss. Alex Verdugo and Rafael Devers homered. The Red Sox recorded their first shutout win of the season, 4–0, in the series' second game. Starter Tanner Houck went 5 2/3 innings while allowing just two hits and earned the win. Verdugo and Xander Bogaerts both hit two-run homers. Boston won the third game of the series, 8–1, with six runs coming in the eighth inning. Starter Michael Wacha held the Twins to a single hit in five innings, but left with the game scoreless and received a no decision. Reliever Matt Strahm got the win. Bogaerts went 3-for-4 with an RBI and two runs scored. The final game of the series was held the same day as the 2022 Boston Marathon. Minnesota split the series with an 8–3 win, giving Boston starter Rich Hill the loss. Bogaerts had three hits and Christian Vázquez homered.

Red Sox split the series 2–2 (19–17 runs)

April 19–April 21, vs. Toronto Blue Jays

In the opener of a three-game home series, the Red Sox defeated the Blue Jays, 2–1, despite being outhit, 8–3. Starter Nathan Eovaldi went 4 2/3 innings and had a no decision. Hansel Robles got the win in relief, and Garrett Whitlock earned a save. Prior to the second game of the series, the team honored former player and longtime broadcaster Jerry Remy, who died in October 2021. Boston took an early 1–0 lead in the game, but Toronto scored five runs in the second inning, en route to a 6–1 win. Starter Nick Pivetta took the loss, falling to 0–3 on the season. In the third game of the series, the Red Sox rallied for two runs in the ninth inning, but fell to the Blue Jays, 3–2. Starter Tanner Houck took the loss. Xander Bogaerts had three hits and an RBI.

Red Sox lost the series 1–2 (5–10 runs)

April 22–April 24, at Tampa Bay Rays

Boston won the opener of a three-game series in Tampa Bay, 4–3. Matt Barnes earned his first save of the season by recording the final out with the bases loaded in the bottom of the ninth inning. Starter Michael Wacha held the Rays to two runs on three hits in five innings and earned the win. Xander Bogaerts went 3-for-4 and scored twice; Rafael Devers hit his third home run of the season. Boston was unable to get a hit in the first nine innings of the series' second game, but neither team was able to score, sending it to extra innings. Boston scored twice in the top of the tenth inning, with Bobby Dalbec driving in one run with a triple. In the bottom of the tenth, Taylor Walls of the Rays reached base on a two-out error by Trevor Story, with Story's throw eluding first baseman Dalbec. Kevin Kiermaier then hit a walk-off home run off of Hansel Robles to give Tampa Bay a 3–2 win. In the final game of the series, the Red Sox took an early 2–0 lead, but the Rays scored five unanswered runs for a 5–2 win. Starter Rich Hill held the Rays scoreless through four innings. In the bottom of the fifth, reliever Phillips Valdéz loaded the bases via two hit batsmen and a walk; all three runners subsequently scored, and Valdéz took the loss.

Red Sox lost the series 1–2 (8–11 runs)

April 25–April 28, at Toronto Blue Jays

Prior to the series in Toronto, the team placed pitchers Kutter Crawford and Tanner Houck on the COVID restricted list, in consideration of Canadian vaccination requirements. Their roster spots were filled by Tyler Danish and John Schreiber. Boston lost the first game of the four-game series, 6–2. Trailing 2–0 entering the eighth inning, the Red Sox tied the game, 2–2. In the bottom of the inning, the Blue Jay put two runners on base off of Matt Strahm; fellow reliever Tyler Danish allowed another baserunner, then surrendered a grand slam to Bo Bichette. In the second game of the series, Boston trailed entering the eighth inning, 2–1, then scored four runs to take a 5–2 lead. With that same score in the bottom of the ninth, Toronto scored three runs off of Jake Diekman via two doubles and a home run, sending the game into extra innings. After the Red Sox were unable to score in the top of the tenth, the Blue Jays pushed across a run in the bottom of the inning for a 6–5 win. Starter Nick Pivetta went 4 2/3 innings and had a no decision; Matt Barnes took the loss. The Red Sox broke their four-game losing streak with a 7–1 win in the third game of the series. Manager Alex Cora returned to the team after missing the prior six games due to COVID. Starter Michael Wacha limited Toronto to one run on four hits in six innings and earned the win. Xander Bogaerts was 4-for-4 with an RBI and two runs scored. Toronto won the final game of the series, 1–0. The only run of the game came in the bottom of the second inning, following a fielding error by Christian Arroyo. Offensively, the Red Sox were limited to four hits. Starter Garrett Whitlock took the loss.

Red Sox lost the series 1–3 (14–14 runs)

April 29–April 30, at Baltimore Orioles

Boston opened a three-game series in Baltimore with a 3–1 win. Starter Rich Hill allowed no runs on one hit in four innings. He was relieved by Tanner Houck, who allowed no runs on two hits in three innings and earned the win. Matt Strahm recorded a save and Christian Arroyo homered. The Orioles won the second game of the series, 2–1, in 10 innings. Boston scored in the top of the first inning, and maintained a 1–0 lead until Baltimore tied the game in the bottom of the eighth. In extra innings, the Red Sox were unable to score in the top of the 10th, and the Orioles scored the winning run in the bottom of the inning aided by a throwing error by reliever Hirokazu Sawamura, who took the loss. Starter Nathan Eovaldi held the Orioles to no runs on three hits in seven innings while striking out eight batters. The Red Sox ended April with a record of 9–13, in fourth place in the American League East, 6 1/2 games behind the division-leading Yankees.

May

=== May ===
The Red Sox entered May in fourth place in the American League East with a record of 9–13, having just split the first two games of a three-game series in Baltimore.

May 1, at Baltimore Orioles (cont'd)

The Orioles won the final game of the series, 9–5, in a game that included a two-hour rain delay. After four scoreless innings, the Red Sox scored once in the top of the fifth, but then gave up nine total runs in the Orioles' next two half-innings. J. D. Martinez hit a grand slam in the ninth inning, but Boston was unable to rally further. Starter Nick Pivetta took the loss and fell to 0–4 on the season. Backup catcher Kevin Plawecki pitched the eighth inning for Boston.

Red Sox lost the series 1–2 (9–12 runs)

May 3–May 5, vs. Los Angeles Angels

Boston opened a three-game home series against the Angels with a 4–0 win. Rafael Devers and J. D. Martinez both homered, and starter Michael Wacha held Los Angeles to three hits in 5 2/3 innings. The second game of the series went into extra innings, with the Angels winning, 10–5. The Red Sox took a 4–3 lead in the bottom of the eighth inning, via a Xander Bogaerts home run. The Angels tied the game in the top of the ninth on two walks and a single. In the top of the tenth, Los Angeles scored six runs, all with two outs, while Boston was held to one run in the bottom of the inning. Starter Garrett Whitlock held the Angels to two runs on two hits in five innings, while Jake Diekman was charged with a blown save and Matt Barnes took the loss. The final game of the series was scoreless until the seventh inning, and ended as an 8–0 shutout for Los Angeles. Starter Rich Hill allowed only a single hit in five innings; reliever Tanner Houck was charged with seven runs in 2 1/3 innings and took the loss.

Red Sox lost the series 1–2 (9–18 runs)

May 6–May 8, vs. Chicago White Sox

The opener of a three-game home series saw the Red Sox fall to the White Sox, 4–2. Starter Nathan Eovaldi took the loss after allowing three runs on six hits in five innings. The White Sox won the second game of the series, 3–1 in 10 innings. Boston took a 1–0 lead in the fifth inning, which held until Chicago scored the tying run in the top of the ninth. In the bottom of the ninth, the Red Sox had runners on second and third with one out, but were unable to score. After the White Sox scored twice in the top of the tenth, the Red Sox had three consecutive ground outs in the bottom of the inning. Starter Nick Pivetta held Chicago to five hits and no runs in six innings; reliever Matt Barnes took the loss. The White Sox completed the sweep with a 3–2 win in the final game of the series, which was featured on MLB Sunday Leadoff. All of Chicago's runs came in the third inning off of starter Tanner Houck, who took the loss. Trailing by a run entering the bottom of the ninth, J. D. Martinez hit a leadoff double, but each of the next three batters made an out.

Red Sox lost the series 0–3 (5–10 runs)

May 10–May 11, at Atlanta Braves

Boston snapped their five-game losing streak with a 9–4 win over Atlanta in the opener of a two-game road series. The Red Sox scored six runs in the second inning, four via a Rafael Devers grand slam. Starter Garrett Whitlock allowed three runs on four hits in three innings; he was relieved by Tyler Danish who pitched two scoreless innings and got the win. John Schreiber pitched the final two innings, retiring all six batters he faced, and earned a save. The Braves won the second game of the series, 5–3. Boston went out to an early 3–0 lead through the middle of the third inning, with Atlanta tying the game in the bottom of that inning. The Red Sox nearly took a 4–3 lead in the bottom of the sixth, when Kevin Plawecki worked a full count with the bases loaded; on what appeared to be ball four, Plawecki was called out on strikes. Plawecki and manager Alex Cora were subsequently ejected for arguing the call. The Braves won the game on a two-run walk-off home run in the bottom of the ninth by Orlando Arcia off of Ryan Brasier.

Red Sox split the series 1–1 (12–9 runs)

May 13–May 15, at Texas Rangers

The Red Sox opened a three-game series at Globe Life Field with a 7–1 win; eight different Boston batters had hits. Starting pitcher Nick Pivetta went seven innings and earned his first win of the season. Boston collected 14 hits in the second game of the series and outscored Texas, 11–3. Starter Rich Hill went six innings at got the win. J. D. Martinez and Rafael Devers each homered. The Rangers avoided a sweep by winning the third game of the series, 7–1. Devers drove in Boston's only run. The Red Sox used Austin Davis as an opener; he did not allow a hit in two innings. Ryan Brasier, the third of four total pitchers for Boston, took the loss after allowing three runs on four hits in the sixth inning.

Red Sox won the series 2–1 (19–11 runs)

May 16–May 18, vs. Houston Astros

In the opener of a three-game home series, Boston defeated Houston, 6–3. Starter Garrett Whitlock allowed two runs on three hits in five innings and received a no decision. Matt Strahm, the fourth of five relievers, got the win, while Hansel Robles earned a save. The game included a 98-minute rain delay. Trevor Story and Xander Bogaerts each homered. The second game of the series was won by the Astros, 13–4, powered by a nine-run second inning. Starter Nathan Eovaldi gave up five home runs in the inning, tying a major-league record; he was charged with six earned runs in 1 2/3 innings of work and took the loss. The Red Sox collected 13 hits, with Rafael Devers and J. D. Martinez each homering. Boston won the final game of the series, 5–1, with starter Nick Pivetta pitching a complete game and allowing just two hits. It was the first complete game by a Red Sox pitcher since Chris Sale on June 5, 2019.

Red Sox won the series 2–1 (15–17 runs)

May 19–May 22, vs. Seattle Mariners

The Red Sox began a four-game home series against the Mariners with a 12–6 win. Starter Rich Hill left after allowing four runs in two innings; Tanner Houck then pitched four scoreless innings and earned the win. Trevor Story hit three home runs and had seven RBIs. Story joined Bobby Doerr and Dustin Pedroia as the only Red Sox second basemen to hit three home runs in a single game. Boston won the second game of the series, 7–3, powered by a grand slam by Story. Jackie Bradley Jr. also homered. Starter Michael Wacha, returning from the injured list, went 4 2/3 innings and had a no decision. Reliever Austin Davis got the win. The Red Sox also won the third game of the series, 6–5, overcoming a four-run first inning by the Mariners. John Schreiber, the fifth of six Boston pitchers, got the win, and Matt Barnes earned his second save of the season. Rafael Devers hit two home runs. Boston complete the series sweep an 8–4 win in extra innings, extending their winning streak to five games. With the Red Sox holding a 3–2 lead entering the top of the ninth, Hansel Robles surrendered a home run to Eugenio Suárez, tying the game. The Mariners pushed across a single run in the top of the 10th. Boston tied the game in the bottom of the inning, and had the bases loaded with two outs. Franchy Cordero then hit a walk-off grand slam. Christian Arroyo and Story also homered during the game, and Jake Diekman earned the win in relief.

Red Sox won the series 4–0 (33–18 runs)

May 24–May 26, at Chicago White Sox

The Red Sox opened a three-game road series against the White Sox with a 16–3 win. Rafael Devers, Kiké Hernández, Trevor Story, and Christian Vázquez each homered, as Boston registered 19 hits. Starter Nick Pivetta allowed three runs on five hits in six innings and earned the win. In the middle game of the series, Boston's winning streak ended at six games due to a 3–1 loss. Starter Rich Hill held Chicago to three runs (two earned) on two hits in five innings, but took the loss. Alex Verdugo had the sole RBI for the Red Sox. Boston took the final game of the series, 16–7, again registering 19 hits. Hernández, Story, and Kevin Plawecki each homered, while Verdugo had four hits and three RBIs. Starter Michael Wacha left after 4 1/3 innings; reliever John Schreiber earned the win.

Red Sox won the series 2–1 (33–13 runs)

May 27–May 30, vs. Baltimore Orioles

The Red Sox and Orioles played a five-game series in four days. Baltimore won the opening game, 12–8, despite Boston holding a 6–0 lead after two innings and an 8–2 lead entering the seventh. Starter Garrett Whitlock allowed two runs on five hits in six innings. Matt Strahm, the third of four Red Sox relievers, took the loss after allowing four runs (three earned) on five hits in 1/3 of an inning. Xander Bogaerts homered. In the first game of a Saturday afternoon doubleheader, Nathan Eovaldi pitched a complete game as Boston won, 5–3. Rafael Devers had four hits and Bobby Dalbec hit a pinch-hit home run. Baltimore won the second game of the doubleheader, 4–2. Red Sox starter Josh Winckowski, making his MLB debut, allowed four runs on six hits in three innings and took the loss. Christian Vázquez had three hits. The Red Sox evened the series by winning the fourth game, 12–2. Five Boston players hit home runs: Dalbec, Devers, Christian Arroyo, Franchy Cordero, and Kiké Hernández. Starter Nick Pivetta earned the win after allowing one run on five hits in six innings. The Orioles shutout the Red Sox in the final game of the series, 10–0. Boston starter Rich Hill allowed six runs on seven hits in four innings and took the loss. Red Sox batters were limited to four hits.

Red Sox lost the series 2–3 (27–31 runs)

May 31–June 1, vs. Cincinnati Reds

The Red Sox lost the opener of a two-game home series against the Reds, 2–1. Down by two runs in the bottom of the ninth, Boston had runners at second the third with no outs, but were only able to score once. Starter Michael Wacha allowed one run on three hits in 5 2/3 innings and took the loss. The Red Sox ended May with a record of 23–27, in fourth place in the American League East, 11 1/2 games behind the division-leading Yankees.

June

=== June ===
The Red Sox entered June in fourth place in the American League East with a record of 23–27, having just lost the first game of a two-game home series against the Reds.

June 1, vs. Cincinnati Reds (cont'd)

The Red Sox defeated the Reds, 7–1, to close out their two-game set. Starter Garrett Whitlock earned the win after allowing one run (unearned) on five hits in six innings. Jackie Bradley Jr. had two hits and drove in four runs.

Red Sox split the series 1–1 (8–3 runs)

June 3–June 5, at Oakland Athletics

Boston opened a three-game road series in Oakland with a 7–2 win. Starter Nathan Eovaldi earned the win after holding the A's scoreless on four hits in six innings. Xander Bogaerts homered, while playing his 1,094th game at shortstop, the most in Red Sox franchise history. The Red Sox shutout the A's in the middle game of the series, 8–0. Starter and winning pitcher Nick Pivetta held Oakland to two hits in seven innings. Alex Verdugo had three hits and two RBIs. Boston completed the series sweep with a 5–2 victory in the third game. Starter Rich Hill allowed one run on three hits in six innings and earned the win. Franchy Cordero and Rafael Devers both homered. The win brought Boston's record to 27–27, reaching .500 for the first time since they were 7–7 on April 22.

Red Sox won the series 3–0 (20–4 runs)

June 6–June 9, at Los Angeles Angels

Michael Wacha pitched a three-hit complete game shutout in the opener of a four-game series in Anaheim, as the Red Sox defeated the Angels, 1–0. Christian Vázquez drove in the lone run of the game in the second inning. Prior to the next game, the Angels fired manager Joe Maddon, as the team had fallen to 27–29, including an active 12-game losing streak, after starting the season 21–11. The Red Sox extended their winning streak to six games with a 6–5 win in extra innings in series' second game. Starter Garrett Whitlock allowed four runs on six hits in four innings. Tanner Houck, the fourth of five Boston relievers, pitched two innings and earned the win; Matt Strahm earned a save. Vázquez drove in the winning run with a single in the top of the 10th inning. The third game of the series was another 1–0 Boston win. Bobby Dalbec drove in the only run of the game, via a sixth-inning double. Starter Nathan Eovaldi earned the win after holding the Angels scoreless on six hits in five innings; Strahm earned another save. Los Angeles won the final game of the series, 5–2. Starter Nick Pivetta allowed four runs on six hits in five innings and took the loss. Dalbec and Alex Verdugo drove in Boston's runs.

Red Sox won the series 3–1 (10–10 runs)

June 10–June 12, at Seattle Mariners

The Red Sox defeated the Mariners, 4–3, in the opener of a three-game series. Starter Rich Hill had a no decision after allowing two runs on five hits in 4 1/3 innings. Jake Diekman, the second of five Boston relievers, earned the win; Tanner Houck earned a save. J. D. Martinez and Bobby Dalbec each homered. Seattle won the series' second game, 7–6. Boston held a 6–5 lead entering the bottom of the ninth, but Hansel Robles allowed two runs for a blown save and the loss. Starter Michael Wacha lasted 4 1/3 innings while allowing four runs (three earned) on eight hits. Martinez, Dalbec, and Rafael Devers each homered. The Red Sox won the final game of the series, 2–0. Starter Kutter Crawford, newly recalled from Triple-A, held the Mariners scoreless on a single hit through five innings, but had a no decision. Tyler Danish, the third of five Boston relievers, got the win, and Houck earned another save. Devers drove in both runs via an eighth-inning homer.

Red Sox won the series 2–1 (12–10 runs)

June 14–June 16, vs. Oakland Athletics

The opener of a three-game home series against the Athletics was a 6–1 Red Sox win. Starter Nick Pivetta earned the win after allowing one run on three hits in eight innings. J. D. Martinez and Rafael Devers both homered. Boston won the second game of the series, 10–1, with starter Josh Winckowski earning the win after pitching five shutout innings. Devers and Alex Verdugo homered. The final game of the series was won by Oakland, 4–3. Boston starter Rich Hill allowed four runs (three earned) on seven hits in 5 2/3 innings and took the loss. Martinez had three of the Red Sox' 11 hits.

Red Sox won the series 2–1 (19–6 runs)

June 17–June 19, vs. St. Louis Cardinals

Boston withstood a four-run ninth inning by St. Louis to win the opener of a three-game home series, 6–5. Starter Michael Wacha earned the win, having allowed just one run on six hits in 5 1/3 innings. Tanner Houck recorded the final out and earned a save. Xander Bogaerts had three hits. The Cardinals won the middle game of the series, 11–2. Red Sox starter Kutter Crawford took the loss after allowing four runs on six hits in four innings. Bogaerts had two of Boston's five hits. The final game of the series was a 6–4 Red Sox win. Starter Nick Pivetta pitched seven innings, allowing one run on four hits and earned the win. Houck again recorded the final out and earned a save after Tyler Danish allowed a three-run homer to Juan Yepez with two outs in the ninth. Trevor Story and Christian Vázquez homered for Boston.

Red Sox won the series 2–1 (14–20 runs)

June 20–June 22, vs. Detroit Tigers

The Red Sox defeated the Tigers, 5–2, in the first game of a three-game homestand. Starter Josh Winckowski allowed two runs on seven hits in 6 2/3 innings and earned the win. Tanner Houck earned his fifth save of the season. Franchy Cordero had three hits and two RBIs. The middle game of the series was also won by Boston, 5–4. Starter Rich Hill earned the win after allowing three runs on seven hits in five innings. John Schreiber recorded the final out and earned a save. Trevor Story and Christian Vázquez both homered. A 6–2 win in the final game of the series completed the sweep for Boston. Starter Michael Wacha pitched six innings, allowing two runs on five hits, and earned the win. Rob Refsnyder hit his first home run as a member of the Red Sox. Jeter Downs made his major-league debut, playing third base and going hitless in four at bats.

Red Sox won the series 3–0 (16–8 runs)

June 24–June 26, at Cleveland Guardians

Boston won the opener of a three-game series in Cleveland, 6–3. Starter Nick Pivetta went seven innings; he allowed two runs on nine hits and earned the win. Christian Arroyo went 3-for-4 at the plate, including a home run. Rafael Devers also homered. The Red Sox also won the second game of the series, 4–2. Starter Josh Winckowski earned the win after allowing two runs on six hits in 5 1/3 innings. Tanner Houck earned a save, Jarren Duran went 4-for-5 at the plate, and Alex Verdugo homered. Boston earned their second straight sweep by winning the finale, 8–3. Rich Hill tossed six strong innings with one earned run and the Sox offense exploded for 15 hits while also drawing 11 walks (two intentional). J. D. Martinez and Trevor Story each drove in two runs; Martinez and Devers both went 3-for-5 on the afternoon. The series sweep extended Boston's winning streak to seven games.

Red Sox won the series 3–0 (18–8 runs)

June 27–June 29, at Toronto Blue Jays

Tanner Houck and Jarren Duran did not accompany the Red Sox to Toronto due to being unvaccinated against COVID-19, and vaccination was required at the time of the series to enter Canada. Their roster spots were filled by Connor Seabold and Yolmer Sánchez, respectively.

Boston's seven-game winning streak came to an end with a 7–2 loss to Toronto in the opener of a three-game series. Connor Seabold started and took the loss after allowing seven runs on nine hits (three of the hits being home runs) in 4 2/3 innings. The Blue Jays also won the second game of the series, 6–5. Toronto scored twice in the bottom of the ninth off of Hansel Robles, after the first two batters of the inning reached base against Tyler Danish, who took the loss. Boston started Michael Wacha had a no decision after allowing four runs on seven hits in five innings. Trevor Story and Rob Refsnyder each homered. The Red Sox avoided being swept by winning the final game of the series, 6–5, in 10 innings. Boston held a 3–2 lead after six innings, but Toronto tied the game with a run in the bottom of the eighth off of Ryan Brasier. After the Red Sox scored three runs in the top of the tenth, Matt Strahm allowed two runs (one earned) in the bottom of the inning but held on to the lead and earned the win. Starter Nick Pivetta held the Blue Jays to two runs on five hits in six innings. Toronto catcher Alejandro Kirk was hit by a pitch from Pivetta in the third inning, which led to words between Vladimir Guerrero Jr. and Pivetta, as benches cleared without punches being thrown. Franchy Cordero was 4-for-5 at the plate and Alex Verdugo drove in four runs, including a two-run homer.

Red Sox lost the series 1–2 (13–18 runs)

With an off day on June 30, Boston held a 43–33 (.566) record, having gone 20–6 (.769) during the month.

July

=== July ===
The Red Sox entered July tied with the Blue Jays for second place in the American League East. Both teams had records of 43–33 and were 12 1/2 games behind the Yankees.

July 1–July 3, at Chicago Cubs

The Red Sox and Cubs met at Wrigley Field for the first time since 2012. The Cubs won the first game of the three-game series, 6–5, scoring three runs in the bottom of the sixth off of Hansel Robles, who took the loss. Starter Rich Hill allowed the Cubs' other three runs, in 4 2/3 innings of work. Jarren Duran homered on the first pitch of the game, and Jackie Bradley Jr. drove in three runs. Chicago also won the second game of the series, 3–1. Red Sox starter Josh Winckowski went six innings, allowing two runs (one earned) on six hits, and took the loss. Boston's only run came in the sixth inning, when Rafael Devers grounded into a double play with runners on first and third with no outs. Duran had two of Boston's five hits. The Red Sox avoided being swept with a 4–2 win in 11 innings in the final game of the series. Connor Seabold started and allowed one run on six hits in four innings. Boston held a 2–1 lead entering the bottom of the eighth, but Chicago scored a run off of Matt Strahm to tie the game. After scoreless ninth and 10th innings, the Red Sox scored two unearned runs in the top of the 11th. Jake Diekman, who had pitched the 10th inning for Boston, also held the Cubs scoreless in the bottom of the 11th and earned the win. Xander Bogaerts left the game in the bottom of the seventh inning after apparently having his left knee spiked while covering second base on a stolen base attempt.

Red Sox lost the series 1–2 (10–11 runs)

July 4–July 6, vs. Tampa Bay Rays

The Red Sox opened a three-game home series with a 4–0 win over the Rays. Austin Davis pitched two innings as an opener, followed by 5 1/3 innings by Kutter Crawford, who earned the win. John Schreiber recorded the final five outs for a save. Trevor Story homered. The Rays won the middle game of the series, 8–4. Starter Nick Pivetta took the loss after allowing seven runs on eight hits in 5 2/3 innings. Story and Xander Bogaerts each homered. Tampa Bay also won the final game of the series, 7–1. Boston starter Brayan Bello, making his MLB debut, took the loss after allowing four runs on six hits in four innings. J. D. Martinez drove in the only Red Sox run.

Red Sox lost the series 1–2 (9–15 runs)

July 7–July 10, vs. New York Yankees

The Yankees won the opener of a four-game series at Fenway Park with a 6–5 win. All of Boston's runs were driven in by Rafael Devers, who had a two-run homer and a three-run homer. Red Sox starter Josh Winckowski took the loss after allowing six runs on six hits in five innings. The Yankees also won the second game of the series, 12–5. Red Sox starter Connor Seabold allowed seven runs on nine hits in 2 2/3 innings and took the loss. Jackie Bradley Jr. made his major-league pitching debut, allowing one run on one hit in the ninth inning. Rob Refsnyder had four hits while Trevor Story and Bobby Dalbec each homered. The Red Sox ended their four-game losing streak with an extra innings 6–5 win over the Yankees in the third game of the series. After falling behind 3–1, Boston scored once in the bottom of the sixth and again in the bottom of the eighth to tie the game. The Yankees scored twice off of reliever Jake Diekman in the top of the 10th, but Diekman was credited the win after the Red Sox scored three times in the bottom of the inning. The rally included the first major-league career hit by Jeter Downs, who was driven in by a two-RBI walk-off single by Alex Verdugo. Starter Kutter Crawford had a no decision after allowing one run on four hits in five innings. Refsnyder also homered. The Red Sox split the series by winning the final game, 11–6. After trailing by four runs midway through the third inning, Boston went on to score nine unanswered runs. Starter Nick Pivetta left after allowing six runs on eight hits in 3 1/3 innings; four Red Sox relievers then held the Yankees to no additional runs on three hits in 5 2/3 innings. Hirokazu Sawamura, who did not allow a hit in two innings pitched, earned the win. Offensively, Story drove in three runs on a bases-clearing double, and was one of four Boston batters with two hits. Franchy Cordero, Christian Vázquez, and J. D. Martinez each homered.

Red Sox split the series 2–2 (27–29 runs)

July 11–July 14, at Tampa Bay Rays

A four-game series in Tampa Bay opened with a 10–5 loss for the Red Sox. After falling behind 5–1, Boston tied the game at 5–5, but were shutout after the fifth inning. Starter Brayan Bello allowed five runs on seven hits in four innings for a no decision. The loss went to Jake Diekman, the second of four Boston relievers, who allowed two runs on one hit in one-third of an inning. J. D. Martinez had two doubles and drove in two runs. The Rays also won the second game of the series, 3–2. Chris Sale made his first start of the season, receiving a no decision after holding Tampa Bay scoreless on three hits in five innings. With Boston holding a 2–0 lead entering the bottom of the sixth, the Rays scored three runs in the bottom of the inning, two of them coming on a play during which Boston made two errors. Matt Strahm, the second of five Red Sox relievers, took the loss. Both Strahm and Trevor Story were struck by baseballs during the game and left with possible hand or wrist injuries. Tampa Bay won the third game of the series, 4–1. Boston's lone run came in the fifth inning as Xander Bogaerts scored when Christian Vázquez grounded into a double play. Starter Josh Winckowski took the loss after allowing three runs on four hits in six innings. The Rays won the final game by a 5–4 score, becoming the first time Boston was ever swept in a four-game series at Tropicana Field. Red Sox starter Kutter Crawford had a no decision after allowing three runs on six hits in six innings. John Schreiber took the loss after allowing two runs on three hits in one inning of relief. Rafael Devers homered, his 20th of the season.

Red Sox lost the series 0–4 (12–22 runs)

July 15–July 17, at New York Yankees

In the final series before the All-Star break, the Red Sox opened a three-game set in The Bronx with a 5–4 win in extra innings. Starter Nathan Eovaldi, back from a month on the injured list, had a no decision after allowing three runs on six hits in 4 1/3 innings. Tanner Houck, the third of four Boston relievers, had a blown save but ultimately earned the win. Ryan Brasier recorded a save. Rafael Devers, Christian Vázquez, and Bobby Dalbec each homered. Xander Bogaerts scored what proved to be the winning run on a wild pitch in the top of the 11th inning. The Yankees won the middle game of the series, 14–1. Starter Nick Pivetta took the loss, allowing seven runs on seven hits in 4 1/3 innings. The Red Sox' only run came on a first-inning homer by Devers. In the final game of the series, starter Chris Sale left in the first inning after being struck by a line drive hit by Aaron Hicks, causing a left fifth-finger fracture. Sale took the loss in the 13–2 defeat, having allowed three runs (two earned) on two hits in 2/3 of an inning. Boston's only runs came on a two-run homer by Jeter Downs.

Red Sox lost the series 1–2 (8–31 runs)

July 18–July 21, All-Star Break

Boston reached the break with a record of 48–45, having gone 5–12 in the first three weeks of July. Red Sox players Rafael Devers, Xander Bogaerts, and J. D. Martinez were selected to the All-Star Game. In the game, played at Dodger Stadium, Devers started at third base and walked in one plate appearance. Bogaerts played at shortstop as a substitute and struck out in one plate appearance. Martinez entered the game as a substitute DH, striking out once and grounding out once. The AL won their ninth Midsummer Classic in a row, by a 3–2 score.

July 22–July 24, vs. Toronto Blue Jays

In the opener of a three-game series at Fenway, Toronto won by a score of 28–5. The 28 runs were the most in a single game in Blue Jays franchise history and also the most runs allowed in a single game in Red Sox franchise history. Toronto's Lourdes Gurriel Jr. became one of the few MLB players to amass six hits in a game. Starter Nathan Eovaldi took the loss after allowing nine runs on eight hits in 2 2/3 innings. Christian Vázquez had two home runs, while Jackie Bradley Jr. and Rob Refsnyder also homered. The Red Sox lost the middle game of the series, 4–1, for their fourth consecutive defeat. Starter Kutter Crawford allowed three runs on five hits in six innings and took the loss. Boston's only run came on a home run by Bobby Dalbec in the second inning. The Blue Jays completed the sweep with an 8–4 win on Sunday afternoon. Brayan Bello started for the Red Sox and took the loss after allowing five runs on nine hits in four innings. Bradley Jr. homered.

Red Sox lost the series 0–3 (10–40 runs)

July 25–July 28, vs. Cleveland Guardians

The Red Sox ended a five-game losing streak with a 3–1 win, opening a four-game home series with the Guardians. Starter Nick Pivetta had a no decision after allowing one runs on seven hits in 5 2/3 innings. Reliever John Schreiber got the win and Garrett Whitlock earned a save. Boston's six hits came from six different players. The Guardians won the second game of the series, 8–3. Starter Josh Winckowski, activated from the COVID-19 related list, allowed five runs on six hits in three innings and took the loss. Xander Bogaerts was 3-for-4 with an RBI and a run scored. The loss dropped the Red Sox to a .500 record on the season for the first time since June 5. A win by Baltimore over Tampa Bay left Boston in last place in the AL East. Cleveland won the third game of the series, 7–6, overcoming two home runs and five RBIs by Bobby Dalbec. The game included five errors; two by the Guardians and three by Franchy Cordero of the Red Sox at first base. Starter Nathan Eovaldi had a no decision after allowing five runs (three earned) on nine hits in six innings. John Schreiber was charged with a blown save while Tanner Houck took the loss. Boston won the final game, 4–2, to split the series. Starter Kutter Crawford held the Guardians to one run on three hits in 5 2/3 innings, but had a no decision. Reliever Jake Diekman got the win and Whitlock earned another save. Bogaerts drove in three runs on sixth-inning homer.

Red Sox split the series 2–2 (16–18 runs)

July 29–July 31, vs. Milwaukee Brewers

In a three-game interleague series at Fenway, Milwaukee won the first game, 4–1. The Red Sox used Austin Davis as an opener; he allowed no runs on one hit in 2 1/3 innings. He was followed by Brayan Bello, who took the loss after allowing two runs on four hits in 4 1/3 innings. Boston's only run was driven in by Alex Verdugo. The Brewers won the second game, 9–4, scoring four late runs after the Red Sox had closed within a run, 5–4, at the end of the seventh inning. Starter Nick Pivetta allowed four runs on nine hits in five innings and took the loss. Christian Arroyo, returning from the injured list, had three hits. Boston won the final game of the series, 7–2, powered by a five-run fifth inning that included four consecutive doubles. Starter Josh Winckowski earned the win after allowing two runs on seven hits in five innings.

Red Sox lost the series 1–2 (12–15 runs)

Boston went 8–19 during July, ending the month with a 51–52 record, in last place of the AL East and 18 games behind the Yankees. The team was also 3 1/2 games out of a wild card spot.

August

=== August ===
The Red Sox entered August with a 51–52 record, in last place of the AL East and 3 1/2 games out of a wild card spot. Notable dates in August:

- August 2 (6 p.m. ET) – MLB trade deadline; to be eligible for postseason play, players had to be acquired prior to the trade deadline
- August 31 – MLB postseason eligibility deadline; the same, for players acquired via waiver claim

August 1–August 3, at Houston Astros

Boston opened a three-game series in Houston with a 3–2 win. Catcher Christian Vázquez was traded from the Red Sox to the Astros prior to the game, for two minor-league prospects. Jarren Duran had two hits, including a home run, and drove in all three runs. Starter Nathan Eovaldi earned the win after allowing two runs (both unearned) on four hits in 6 1/3 innings. Tanner Houck earned his seventh save of the season. Boston won the second game of the series, 2–1. Tommy Pham, acquired the day prior, made his Red Sox debut, recording a hit and scoring a run. Starter Kutter Crawford earned the win after pitching six innings while allowing one run on seven hits. Houck again earned a save. Rafael Devers, back from an injury, had a home run and two RBIs. Houston won the final game of the series, 6–1, to avoid being swept. Boston's only run came on a ninth-inning home run by Xander Bogaerts. Starter Rich Hill took the loss after allowing four runs on six hits in three innings.

Red Sox won the series 2–1 (6–9 runs)

August 4–August 7, at Kansas City Royals

In the opener of a four-game series in Kansas City, the Red Sox lost to the Royals, 7–3. With the score tied, 3–3, the Royals scored four runs in the bottom of the seventh, including a three-run home run that may or may not have hit the left-field foul pole, leading to the ejection of Alex Cora. Starter Nick Pivetta had a no decision after allowing three runs on seven hits in five innings. Reliever Darwinzon Hernández, who allowed four runs on four hits in two innings, took the loss. Rafael Devers drove in two runs. Boston won the second game of the series, 7–4, with the win going to starter Josh Winckowski, who pitched five innings while allowing one run on five hits. Xander Bogaerts was 4-for-5 and Alex Verdugo was 3-for-4. The Royals won the third game of the series, 5–4, with Nick Pratto hitting a walk-off home run with two outs in the bottom of the ninth inning. Garrett Whitlock, who pitched 2 2/3 innings, allowed only that hit and took the loss. Starter Nathan Eovaldi allowed four runs on seven hits in six innings for a no decision. Verdugo and Bobby Dalbec both homered. The Royals won the final game of the series, 13–5, with the loss going to starter Kutter Crawford, who pitched five innings while allowing five runs on five hits. Hernández also allowed five runs in relief, facing five batters without recording an out. Tommy Pham, batting leadoff, had three RBIs via a single and home run. Devers also homered.

Red Sox lost the series 1–3 (19–29 runs)

August 9–August 10, vs. Atlanta Braves

The opener of a two-game home series went into extra innings. Boston held a 5–4 lead after five innings, and the score stood at 6–6 after eight innings. After a scoreless ninth, each team scored once in the tenth. Atlanta then scored twice in the top of the 11th and held Boston scoreless in the bottom of the inning for a 9–7 win. Boston starter Rich Hill allowed four runs on seven hits in four innings. Reliever Kaleb Ort, the sixth of seven Red Sox relievers, allowed three runs (one earned) on three hits in 1 2/3 innings and took the loss. Christian Arroyo, Tommy Pham, and Jarren Duran each homered. The Braves also won the second game, 8–4. Starter Nick Pivetta took the loss and fell to 8–9 on the season; he allowed three runs on five hits in six innings. Pham again homered. It was the fourth time this season that the Red Sox were swept in a series.

Red Sox lost the series 0–2 (11–17 runs)

August 11, vs. Baltimore Orioles

In a single-game home series against the Orioles, scheduled due to the delayed start of the season, the Red Sox won, 4–3. Starter Josh Winckowski had a no decision after allowing three runs on six hits in 5 2/3 innings. Reliever Austin Davis retired the only batter he faced and was credited with the win. John Schreiber pitched the final two innings and earned a save. Xander Bogaerts was 2-for-3 with an RBI and run scored.

Red Sox won the series 1–0 (4–3 runs)

August 12–August 14, vs. New York Yankees

The Red Sox won the first of three home games against the Yankees, 3–2, in 10 innings. J. D. Martinez had three hits and two RBIs, while Tommy Pham drove in the game-winning run. Starter Nathan Eovaldi held New York to two runs on eight hits in six innings. Garrett Whitlock pitched the final two innings without allowing a hit and earned the win. The middle game of the series was a 3–2 Yankees win. Down by a run, the Red Sox had two runners on base with one out in the ninth inning, but were unable to score the tying run. Starter Kutter Crawford pitched six innings, allowing two runs on two hits for a no decision. John Schreiber allowed one run on three hits in two innings and took the loss. The Red Sox won the final game of the series, 3–0. Rafael Devers hit a two-run home run and Xander Bogaerts had the other RBI. Starter Michael Wacha, activated from the injured list, got the win after holding the Yankees to two hits in seven innings. Whitlock earned the save. The game was completed in just two hours and 15 minutes, the shortest Red Sox–Yankees game since another 2:15 game in 2018 and a 2:13 game in 1994.

Red Sox won the series 2–1 (8–5 runs)

August 16–August 18, at Pittsburgh Pirates

Boston won the first of three games in Pittsburgh, 5–3, after jumping out to 4–0 first-inning lead. Starter Nick Pivetta allowed no runs on just one hit in seven innings, and earned the win. Matt Barnes retired the side in order in the bottom of the ninth for a save. Tommy Pham had two of Boston's five hits. The second game of the series was also won by the Red Sox, 8–3. Starter Rich Hill earned the win after holding the Pirates to two runs on three hits in five innings. Christian Arroyo had three hits and three RBIs, while Alex Verdugo had three hits and scored three runs. Pittsburgh avoided being swept with an 8–2 win in the final game of the series. The Red Sox were limited to five hits, all singles. Starter Josh Winckowski took the loss after allowing six runs on seven hits in five innings.

Red Sox won the series 2–1 (15–14 runs)

August 19–August 21, at Baltimore Orioles

The opener of a three-game series at Camden Yards featured 37 hits and 25 runs, ending in a 15–10 Orioles victory. Starter Kutter Crawford took the loss after allowing nine runs on 11 hits in 3 2/3 innings. Tommy Pham had two hits and three RBIs before leaving the game in the fifth inning due to injury. Alex Verdugo, Christian Arroyo, and Rob Refsnyder each had three hits and an RBI. Xander Bogaerts and Alex Cora were both ejected in the fourth inning following a called third strike on Bogaerts. Boston won the middle game of the series, 4–3. Arroyo batted leadoff and had three hits; Kiké Hernández drove in two runs. Starter Michael Wacha earned the win, pitching 5 2/3 innings and holding Baltimore scoreless on four hits. Garrett Whitlock pitched the final two innings for the save. The final game of the series was played in Williamsport, Pennsylvania, as the 2022 edition of the MLB Little League Classic. It was won by the Orioles, 5–3. After Baltimore took an early 2–1 lead, Boston tied the game at 2–2 in the top of the eighth on a home run by Franchy Cordero. The Orioles then scored three runs in the bottom of the inning, and held the Red Sox to a one run in the top of the ninth via a Bogaerts homer. Starter Nick Pivetta had a no decision after allowing two runs on six hits in 5 2/3 innings. Matt Barnes, the second of four Boston relievers, was charged with the loss.

Red Sox lost the series 1–2 (17–23 runs)

August 23–August 25, vs. Toronto Blue Jays

Toronto won the opener of a three-game series at Fenway, 9–3. Starter Josh Winckowski took the loss after allowing six runs on six hits in 2 2/3 innings. Backup catcher Reese McGuire pitched a scoreless ninth inning for the Red Sox. Rafael Devers had three hits and an RBI. Both Xander Bogaerts and Tommy Pham left the game due to back spasms. The middle game of the series went into extra innings and was won by the Blue Jays, 3–2. Starter Brayan Bello, back with Boston from the injured list, had a no decision after allowing two runs on six hits in five innings. Ryan Brasier allowed one run on one hit in the 10th inning and took the loss. Franchy Cordero had two hits and drove in both Red Sox runs. Toronto completed a sweep with a 6–5 win, again in 10 innings, in the final game of the series. Starter Kutter Crawford had a no decision after allowing four runs on 10 hits in 4 2/3 innings. The loss went to John Schreiber, the last of five Boston relievers, who allowed a run in the 10th inning. McGuire had three hits, including his first MLB triple.

Red Sox lost the series 0–3 (10–18 runs)

August 26–August 28, vs. Tampa Bay Rays

In the first game of a three-game home series, Boston went from a 4–1 deficit to a 9–4 lead and held on for a 9–8 win. Starter Michael Wacha earned the win after allowing four runs on five hits in six innings. Garrett Whitlock held the Rays scoreless in the ninth inning for a save. Franchy Cordero and Xander Bogaerts each homered. Kevin Plawecki had three hits and two RBIs. The Red Sox also won the middle game of the series, 5–1. Starter Rich Hill held Tampa Bay scoreless on three hits in seven innings and earned the win. John Schreiber recorded the final four outs and earned a save. Kiké Hernández homered. Tampa Bay avoided a sweep by winning the final game of the series, 12–4. Starter Nick Pivetta allowed five runs on eight hits in five innings and took the loss. Boston had home runs by Cordero, J. D. Martinez, and Tommy Pham. Bogaerts had three hits.

Red Sox won the series 2–1 (18–21 runs)

August 29–August 31, at Minnesota Twins

Boston lost the opener of a three-game series in Minnesota, 4–2. Starter Brayan Bello took the loss after allowing three runs on five hits in four innings. Trevor Story was 3-for-3 with a walk, stolen base, and a run scored. The Twins won the middle game of the series, 10–5, largely powered by six RBIs from Nick Gordon, including a fifth-inning grand slam off of reliever Ryan Brasier. Starter Kutter Crawford allowed five runs (four earned) on four hits in 4 1/3 innings and took the loss. The Red Sox won the final game of the series, 6–5. Xander Bogaerts had two hits and five RBIs, including a grand slam. J. D. Martinez also homered. Starter Michael Wacha improved to 10–1 on the season, getting the win after holding Minnesota to two runs on four hits in six innings. Matt Barnes recorded his fourth save of the season.

Red Sox lost the series 1–2 (13–19 runs)

Boston ended August with a record of 63–68, having gone 12–16 during the month. The team was in last place of the AL East and eight games behind Toronto for the third and final wild card postseason berth.

September

=== September ===
The Red Sox entered September with a 63–68 record, in last place of the AL East and eight games out of a wild card spot. MLB active rosters expanded from 26 to 28 players as of September 1, effective through the end of the regular season—the Red Sox called up catcher Connor Wong and pitcher Eduard Bazardo from Worcester.

September 1–September 4, vs. Texas Rangers

Boston scored four times in the bottom of the ninth inning to win the opener of a four-game home set against Texas, 9–8. Christian Arroyo and Rafael Devers each had three RBIs; Alex Verdugo homered. Starter Rich Hill had a no decision after allowing four runs on five hits in four innings. Jeurys Familia, the last of five Red Sox relievers, pitched a scoreless top of the ninth and earned the win. The Red Sox won the second game of the series, 9–1. Starter Nick Pivetta left after three innings, having been struck on the left leg by a ground ball. He was replaced by Tyler Danish, who pitched a scoreless fourth inning and earned the win. Connor Wong hit his first MLB home run. The third game was also won by Boston, 5–3. Starter Brayan Bello earned his first MLB win after holding the Rangers scoreless on three hits in six innings. John Schreiber recorded the final two outs for a save. Devers had two hits and two RBIs. Prior to the final game of the series, the Red Sox called up prospect Triston Casas from Worcester to make his MLB debut. Boston completed the sweep with a 5–2 win. Starter Josh Winckowski had a no decision after allowing two runs on three hits in four innings. Kaleb Ort, the first of four Red Sox relievers, pitched 1 2/3 scoreless innings and earned the win. Schreiber pitched the ninth inning and earned another save. Xander Bogaerts was 3-for-4 with two RBIs, Trevor Story had a homer plus two other hits and three RBIs, and Casas collected hit first MLB hit.

Red Sox won the series 4–0 (28–14 runs)

September 5–September 7, at Tampa Bay Rays

In a Labor Day matchup, Tampa Bay won the opener of a three-game series, 4–3. Starter Michael Wacha had a no decision after allowing two runs on seven hits in six innings. Jeurys Familia allowed two runs on one hit in one-third of an inning and took the loss. Alex Verdugo homered and Xander Bogaerts had two hits, his ninth consecutive multi-hit game, tying a Red Sox franchise record. The Rays won the middle game of the series, 8–4. Starter Rich Hill took the loss, having allowed five runs on nine hits in four innings. Triston Casas hit his first major-league home run; Tommy Pham also homered. Bogaerts' hitting streak came to an end, as he went 0-for-3. Tampa Bay's sweep was completed with a 1–0 win in the final game of the series. The only run of the game came in the bottom of the fifth, on a sequence of double, fly out, single. Starter Nick Pivetta took the loss, having allowed that one run on two hits in five innings.

Red Sox lost the series 0–3 (7–13 runs)

September 9–September 11, at Baltimore Orioles

Boston lost their fourth game in a row, 3–2, to open a three-game series in Baltimore. Starter Brayan Bello allowed three runs on three hits in 5 1/3 innings and took the loss. Xander Bogaerts went 3-for-5 with a home run and both Red Sox RBIs. Boston won the middle game of the series, 17–4. Rafael Devers hit a grand slam in the first inning; Christian Arroyo also homered, and Kiké Hernández had four hits. Starter Michael Wacha got the win after allowing three runs on six hits in six innings, improving his record to 11–1 for the season. The final game of the series was a 1–0 Red Sox win. Bogaerts drove in the only run of the game with a sacrifice fly in the first inning. Starter Rich Hill went five innings, allowing two hits while striking out seven batters, and earned the win. Matt Barnes pitched the ninth inning and earned a save.

Red Sox won the series 2–1 (20–7 runs)

September 13–September 14, vs. New York Yankees

In 10 innings, the Yankees won the opener of a two-game series at Fenway, 7–6. Three Boston batters hit home runs: Xander Bogaerts, Reese McGuire, and Triston Casas. Starter Nick Pivetta had a no decision after allowing three runs on six hits in 5 1/3 innings. Jeurys Familia allowed two earned runs in the 10th inning and took the loss. Aaron Judge homered twice for New York, bringing his total on the season to 57. New York also won the second game of the series, 5–3. Only one of their runs was earned, as the Red Sox were charged with three errors. Starter Brayan Bello fell to 1–6 on the season after allowing three runs (all unearned) on six hits in five innings.

Red Sox lost the series 0–2 (9–12 runs)

September 16–September 18, vs. Kansas City Royals

The Red Sox opened a three-game home series against the Royals with a 2–1 win, despite being outhit, 8–3. Both Boston runs came in the bottom of the eighth inning, on four walks and a single. Starter Michael Wacha had a no decision after allowing one run on seven hits in seven innings. Garrett Whitlock earned the win in relief and Matt Strahm earned a save. The Royals won the middle game of the series, 9–0. Starter Rich Hill allowed four runs on eight hits in 4 2/3 innings and took the loss. Boston won the final game of the series, 13–3. Starter Nick Pivetta recorded his 10th win of the season, allowing three runs on seven hits in five innings. Rafael Devers had four of the Red Sox' 20 hits.

Red Sox won the series 2–1 (15–13 runs)

September 20–September 21, at Cincinnati Reds

The Red Sox opened a two-game series in Cincinnati with a 5–3 win. Brayan Bello earned the win, allowing one run on eight hits in five innings. John Schreiber earned a save. Rafael Devers, Rob Refsnyder, and J. D. Martinez each homered. Boston lost the second game of the series, 5–1. Connor Seabold, recalled from Worcester, took the loss after allowing four runs on six hits in five innings. Alex Verdugo drove in the only Red Sox run.

Red Sox tied the series 1–1 (6–8 runs)

September 22–September 25, at New York Yankees

Boston opened a four-game series at Yankee Stadium with a 5–4 loss in 10 innings. Starter Michael Wacha had a no decision after allowing three runs on six hits in six innings. All four of Boston's runs came in the seventh inning, on a solo home run by Triston Casas and a three-run homer by Reese McGuire. Reliever Kaleb Ort allowed an unearned run in the 10th inning and took the loss. The second game of the series was another 5–4 win for New York. Starter Rich Hill went five innings and had a no decision after allowing four runs on five hits. Reliever Matt Strahm, who allowed a run in the bottom of the eighth, took the loss. Alex Verdugo had three hits and Tommy Pham homered. The Yankees won the third game of the series, 7–5. Red Sox reliever John Schreiber took the loss after allowing two runs in the seventh inning; starter Nick Pivetta had a no decision after allowing five runs on six hits in five innings. Casas and McGuire each homered. In the final game of the series, New York completed the sweep with a rain-shortened 2–0 win. Brayan Bello pitched all six innings for Boston and took the loss after allowing six hits; only one run was earned. Rob Refsnyder had Boston's only hit of the game. The loss, which gave the Red Sox a 72–80 record, eliminated the team from playoff contention.

Red Sox lost the series 0–4 (13–19 runs)

September 26–September 29, vs. Baltimore Orioles

The Red Sox opened a four-game home series against the Orioles with a 14–8 loss, their sixth defeat in a row. The game included a 1-hour, 40-minute rain delay. Starter Connor Seabold allowed five runs (four earned) on five hits in two innings and took the loss. J. D. Martinez and Rob Refsnyder each homered; Refsnyder and Rafael Devers each had three hits. Boston's losing streak ended at six games with a 13–9 win in the second game of the series. The teams combined for 26 total hits and used 13 total pitchers who threw 380 pitches during the game. Started Michael Wacha allowed six runs on eight hits in 3 1/3 innings and received a no decision; the win went to reliever Matt Strahm. Triston Casas had three hits, including a home run. Boston won the second game of the series, 3–1. Starter Rich Hill got the win after holding the Orioles scoreless on five hits in six innings. Matt Barnes earned a save. Abraham Almonte and Alex Verdugo each homered. The final game of the series was a 5–3 Red Sox win. Starter Nathan Eovaldi, back from the injured list, had a no decision after allowing two runs (one earned) on five hits in 4 2/3 innings. The win went to Zack Kelly, the third of four Boston relievers. Kaleb Ort earned a save. Martinez homered.

Red Sox won the series 3–1 (29–27 runs)

September 30 vs. Toronto Blue Jays

Boston opened their final road series of the season with a 9–0 loss in Toronto. Starter Nick Pivetta took the loss after allowing four runs (three earned) on six hits in five innings. The Red Sox were held to three hits and three walks. The team ended September with a record of 75–82, out of playoff contention and still in last place of the AL East.

October

=== October ===
Boston entered October with a 75–82 record, having just lost the opener of a three-game series in Toronto. With five games left in the season, the Red Sox were assured of finishing with a losing record.

October 1–October 2, vs. Toronto Blue Jays (cont'd)

The Blue Jays won the second game of the series, 10–0. Starter Brayan Bello took the loss, having allowed four runs on 10 hits in four innings, and fell to 2–8 on the season. The Red Sox were limited to five hits, two by Rafael Devers. Toronto completed the sweep with a 6–3 win in the Red Sox' final road game of the season. Starter Michael Wacha suffered only his second loss of the season (against 11 wins) after allowing five runs on six hits in four innings. Bobby Dalbec homered and had all three RBIs for Boston.

Red Sox lost the series 0–3 (3–25 runs)

October 3–September 5, vs. Tampa Bay Rays

The Red Sox opened their final series of the year with a 4–3 home win over the Rays. Starter Rich Hill had a no decision after allowing one run on three hits in six innings. John Schreiber earned the win in relief, Matt Barnes earned his seventh save of the season, and Rafael Devers had three hits. The middle game of the series was a rain-shortened five-inning win by Boston, 6–0. Starter Nathan Eovaldi pitched all five innings, allowing just two hits, and got the win. Xander Bogaerts had a grand slam. Boston completed their season with a 6–3 win, sweeping the Rays. Starter Nick Pivetta had a no decision after pitching four innings and allowing two runs on four hits. Eduard Bazardo, the first of five relievers, got the win, while Barnes earned a save. J. D. Martinez had four RBIs via two home runs. The sweep of the Rays left the Red Sox with a 78–84 record for the season.

Red Sox won the series 3–0 (16–6 runs)

== Season standings ==
=== American League East ===
AL East
Team	W	L	Pct.	GB	Home	Road
New York Yankees	99	63	.611	—	57‍–‍24	42‍–‍39
Toronto Blue Jays	92	70	.568	7	47‍–‍34	45‍–‍36
Tampa Bay Rays	86	76	.531	13	51‍–‍30	35‍–‍46
Baltimore Orioles	83	79	.512	16	45‍–‍36	38‍–‍43
Boston Red Sox	78	84	.481	21	43‍–‍38	35‍–‍46

=== American League Wild Card ===
Division leaders
Team	W	L	Pct.
Houston Astros	106	56	.654
New York Yankees	99	63	.611
Cleveland Guardians	92	70	.568

Wild Card teams (Top 3 teams qualify for postseason)
Team	W	L	Pct.	GB
Toronto Blue Jays	92	70	.568	+6
Seattle Mariners	90	72	.556	+4
Tampa Bay Rays	86	76	.531	—
Baltimore Orioles	83	79	.512	3
Chicago White Sox	81	81	.500	5
Minnesota Twins	78	84	.481	8
Boston Red Sox	78	84	.481	8
Los Angeles Angels	73	89	.451	13
Texas Rangers	68	94	.420	18
Detroit Tigers	66	96	.407	20
Kansas City Royals	65	97	.401	21
Oakland Athletics	60	102	.370	26

=== Red Sox team leaders ===
Batting
Batting average†	Xander Bogaerts	.307
Hits	Xander Bogaerts	171
RBIs	Rafael Devers	88
Home runs	Rafael Devers	27
Runs scored	Bogaerts; Devers	84
Stolen bases	Trevor Story	13
Games played	Alex Verdugo	152
Pitching
ERA‡	Nick Pivetta	4.56
WHIP‡	Nick Pivetta	1.38
Innings pitched	Nick Pivetta	179 2/3
Strikeouts	Nick Pivetta	175
Games started	Nick Pivetta	33
Losses	Nick Pivetta	12
Wins	Michael Wacha	11
Saves	Matt Barnes; Tanner Houck; John Schreiber	8
Games pitched	Ryan Brasier	68

Updated through end of the regular season.
† Minimum 3.1 plate appearances per team games played
AVG qualified batters: Bogaerts, Devers, Martinez, Verdugo
‡ Minimum 1 inning pitched per team games played
ERA & WHIP qualified pitchers: Pivetta

=== Record vs. opponents ===
2022 American League record Source: MLB Standings Grid – 2022
Team	BAL	BOS	CWS	CLE	DET	HOU	KC	LAA	MIN	NYY	OAK	SEA	TB	TEX	TOR	NL
Baltimore	—	9–10	5–2	3–3	1–5	4–3	4–3	6–1	3–4	7–12	3–4	2–4	9–10	6–0	9–10	12–8
Boston	10–9	—	2–4	5–2	5–1	4–2	3–4	4–3	3–4	6–13	5–1	6–1	7–12	6–1	3–16	9–11
Chicago	2–5	4–2	—	7–12	12–7	3–4	9–10	3–4	9–10	3–4	5–2	4–2	4–2	3–4	2–4	11–9
Cleveland	3–3	2–5	12–7	—	10–9	3–4	12–7	3–4	13–6	1–5	6–1	1–6	4–2	5–1	5–2	12–8
Detroit	5–1	1–5	7–12	9–10	—	0–7	10–9	3–3	8–11	1–5	2–5	1–6	2–5	4–3	2–5	11–9
Houston	3–4	2–4	4–3	4–3	7–0	—	5–2	13–6	6–0	5–2	12–7	12–7	5–1	14–5	2–4	12–8
Kansas City	3–4	4–3	10–9	7–12	9–10	2–5	—	3–3	7–12	1–6	3–3	2–4	3–4	2–4	2–5	7–13
Los Angeles	1–6	3–4	4–3	4–3	3–3	6–13	3–3	—	4–2	2–4	12–7	10–9	2–5	9–10	3–4	7–13
Minnesota	4–3	4–3	10–9	6–13	11–8	0–6	12–7	2–4	—	2–5	5–1	4–3	4–2	2–5	4–3	8–12
New York	12–7	13–6	4–3	5–1	5–1	2–5	6–1	4–2	5–2	—	5–2	2–4	11–8	4–3	11–8	10–10
Oakland	4–3	1–5	2–5	1–6	5–2	7–12	3–3	7–12	1–5	2–5	—	8–11	3–4	8–11	3–3	5–15
Seattle	4–2	1–6	2–4	6–1	6–1	7–12	4–2	9–10	3–4	4–2	11–8	—	2–5	14–5	5–2	12–8
Tampa Bay	10–9	12–7	2–4	2–4	5–2	1–5	4–3	5–2	2–4	8–11	4–3	5–2	—	4–3	10–9	12–8
Texas	0–6	1–6	4–3	1–5	3–4	5–14	4–2	10–9	5–2	3–4	11–8	5–14	3–4	—	2–4	11–9
Toronto	10–9	16–3	4–2	2–5	5–2	4–2	5–2	4–3	3–4	8–11	3–3	2–5	9–10	4–2	—	13–7

Updated with the results of all games through October 5, 2022.

== Game log ==
On March 10, 2022, it was announced that Opening Day would be April 7, with early-season games originally canceled by the lockout being made up during the season; the end of the regular season was moved from October 2 to October 5. On April 6, it was announced that Boston's first game, scheduled for Yankee Stadium, had been postponed to April 8 due to forecasted inclement weather in New York City.

Red Sox Win	Red Sox Loss	Game postponed	Eliminated from Playoff Race

2022 Boston Red Sox Season Game Log: 78–84 (Home: 43–38; Away: 35–46)
April: 9–13 (Home: 3–4; Away: 6–9)

#	Date	Opponent	Score	Win	Loss	Save	Stadium	Attendance	Record	Box/ Streak
—	April 7	@ Yankees	Postponed (rain). Makeup date April 8.							
1	April 8	@ Yankees	5–6 (11)	King (1–0)	Crawford (0–1)	—	Yankee Stadium	46,097	0–1	L1
2	April 9	@ Yankees	2–4	Luetge (1–0)	Pivetta (0–1)	Chapman (1)	Yankee Stadium	46,882	0–2	L2
3	April 10	@ Yankees	4–3	Crawford (1–1)	Schmidt (0–1)	Diekman (1)	Yankee Stadium	40,108	1–2	W1
4	April 11	@ Tigers	1–3	Fulmer (1–0)	Davis (0–1)	Soto (1)	Comerica Park	11,840	1–3	L1
5	April 12	@ Tigers	5–3	Whitlock (1–0)	Lange (0–1)	—	Comerica Park	15,781	2–3	W1
6	April 13	@ Tigers	9–7	Eovaldi (1–0)	Rodríguez (0–1)	Robles (1)	Comerica Park	10,522	3–3	W2
7	April 15	Twins	4–8	Ryan (1–1)	Pivetta (0–2)	—	Fenway Park	36,266	3–4	L1
8	April 16	Twins	4–0	Houck (1–0)	Gray (0–1)	—	Fenway Park	34,990	4–4	W1
9	April 17	Twins	8–1	Strahm (1–0)	Ober (1–1)	—	Fenway Park	28,858	5–4	W2
10	April 18	Twins	3–8	Bundy (2–0)	Hill (0–1)	—	Fenway Park	32,514	5–5	L1
11	April 19	Blue Jays	2–1	Robles (1–0)	García (0–1)	Whitlock (1)	Fenway Park	31,640	6–5	W1
12	April 20	Blue Jays	1–6	Berríos (1–0)	Pivetta (0–3)	—	Fenway Park	33,354	6–6	L1
13	April 21	Blue Jays	2–3	Gausman (1–1)	Houck (1–1)	Romano (7)	Fenway Park	35,792	6–7	L2
14	April 22	@ Rays	4–3	Wacha (1–0)	Kluber (0–1)	Barnes (1)	Tropicana Field	16,902	7–7	W1
15	April 23	@ Rays	2–3 (10)	Wisler (1–0)	Robles (1–1)	—	Tropicana Field	19,137	7–8	L1
16	April 24	@ Rays	2–5	McClanahan (1–1)	Valdéz (0–1)	Thompson (1)	Tropicana Field	20,993	7–9	L2
17	April 25	@ Blue Jays	2–6	Cimber (4–0)	Strahm (1–1)	—	Rogers Centre	20,981	7–10	L3
18	April 26	@ Blue Jays	5–6 (10)	Romano (1–1)	Barnes (0–1)	—	Rogers Centre	22,611	7–11	L4
19	April 27	@ Blue Jays	7–1	Wacha (2–0)	Thornton (0–1)	—	Rogers Centre	20,468	8–11	W1
20	April 28	@ Blue Jays	0–1	Manoah (4–0)	Whitlock (1–1)	Romano (9)	Rogers Centre	23,144	8–12	L1
21	April 29	@ Orioles	3–1	Houck (2–1)	Bradish (0–1)	Strahm (1)	Camden Yards	15,685	9–12	W1
22	April 30	@ Orioles	1–2 (10)	López (2–1)	Sawamura (0–1)	—	Camden Yards	19,927	9–13	L1

May: 14–14 (Home: 9–10; Away: 5–4)

#	Date	Opponent	Score	Win	Loss	Save	Stadium	Attendance	Record	Box/ Streak
23	May 1	@ Orioles	5–9	Lyles (2–2)	Pivetta (0–4)	—	Camden Yards	19,117	9–14	L2
24	May 3	Angels	4–0	Wacha (3–0)	Syndergaard (2–1)	—	Fenway Park	29,793	10–14	W1
25	May 4	Angels	5–10 (10)	Tepera (1–0)	Barnes (0–2)	—	Fenway Park	27,679	10–15	L1
26	May 5	Angels	0–8	Ohtani (3–2)	Houck (2–2)	—	Fenway Park	29,476	10–16	L2
27	May 6	White Sox	2–4	Velasquez (2–2)	Eovaldi (1–1)	Hendriks (8)	Fenway Park	30,944	10–17	L3
28	May 7	White Sox	1–3 (10)	López (4–0)	Barnes (0–3)	Hendriks (9)	Fenway Park	33,026	10–18	L4
29	May 8	White Sox	2–3	Keuchel (2–3)	Houck (2–3)	Sousa (1)	Fenway Park	28,602	10–19	L5
30	May 10	@ Braves	9–4	Danish (1–0)	Wright (3–2)	Schreiber (1)	Truist Park	38,378	11–19	W1
31	May 11	@ Braves	3–5	Jansen (1–0)	Brasier (0–1)	—	Truist Park	37,200	11–20	L1
32	May 13	@ Rangers	7–1	Pivetta (1–4)	Dunning (1–2)	—	Globe Life Field	28,324	12–20	W1
33	May 14	@ Rangers	11–3	Hill (1–1)	Otto (1–1)	—	Globe Life Field	34,462	13–20	W2
34	May 15	@ Rangers	1–7	Pérez (2–2)	Brasier (0–2)	—	Globe Life Field	27,607	13–21	L1
35	May 16	Astros	6–3	Strahm (2–1)	Neris (1–2)	Robles (2)	Fenway Park	29,706	14–21	W1
36	May 17	Astros	4–13	Urquidy (3–1)	Eovaldi (1–2)	—	Fenway Park	27,328	14–22	L1
37	May 18	Astros	5–1	Pivetta (2–4)	García (3–2)	—	Fenway Park	31,717	15–22	W1
38	May 19	Mariners	12–6	Houck (3–3)	Kirby (0–1)	—	Fenway Park	29,783	16–22	W2
39	May 20	Mariners	7–3	Davis (1–1)	Ray (4–4)	—	Fenway Park	30,842	17–22	W3
40	May 21	Mariners	6–5	Schreiber (1–0)	Steckenrider (0–2)	Barnes (2)	Fenway Park	34,832	18–22	W4
41	May 22	Mariners	8–4 (10)	Diekman (1–0)	Muñoz (1–2)	—	Fenway Park	33,896	19–22	W5
42	May 24	@ White Sox	16–3	Pivetta (3–4)	Cease (4–2)	—	Guaranteed Rate Field	21,835	20–22	W6
43	May 25	@ White Sox	1–3	Giolito (3–1)	Hill (1–2)	Hendriks (14)	Guaranteed Rate Field	21,075	20–23	L1
44	May 26	@ White Sox	16–7	Schreiber (2–0)	Keuchel (2–5)	—	Guaranteed Rate Field	24,896	21–23	W1
45	May 27	Orioles	8–12	Pérez (3–0)	Strahm (2–2)	—	Fenway Park	29,251	21–24	L1
46	May 28 (1)	Orioles	5–3	Eovaldi (2–2)	Akin (1–1)	—	Fenway Park	26,912	22–24	W1
47	May 28 (2)	Orioles	2–4	Krehbiel (2–3)	Winckowski (0–1)	López (6)	Fenway Park	28,491	22–25	L1
48	May 29	Orioles	12–2	Pivetta (4–4)	Zimmermann (2–3)	—	Fenway Park	35,715	23–25	W1
49	May 30	Orioles	0–10	Wells (2–4)	Hill (1–3)	—	Fenway Park	24,809	23–26	L1
50	May 31	Reds	1–2	Castillo (2–2)	Wacha (3–1)	Santillan (4)	Fenway Park	28,577	23–27	L2

June: 20–6 (Home: 8–2; Away: 12–4)

#	Date	Opponent	Score	Win	Loss	Save	Stadium	Attendance	Record	Box/ Streak
51	June 1	Reds	7–1	Whitlock (2–1)	Greene (2–7)	—	Fenway Park	30,219	24–27	W1
52	June 3	@ Athletics	7–2	Eovaldi (3–2)	Kaprielian (0–3)	—	Oakland Coliseum	17,852	25–27	W2
53	June 4	@ Athletics	8–0	Pivetta (5–4)	Blackburn (5–2)	—	Oakland Coliseum	14,796	26–27	W3
54	June 5	@ Athletics	5–2	Hill (2–3)	Montas (2–6)	—	Oakland Coliseum	12,084	27–27	W4
55	June 6	@ Angels	1–0	Wacha (4–1)	Syndergaard (4–4)	—	Angel Stadium	29,395	28–27	W5
56	June 7	@ Angels	6–5 (10)	Houck (4–3)	Barría (1–1)	Strahm (2)	Angel Stadium	27,627	29–27	W6
57	June 8	@ Angels	1–0	Eovaldi (4–2)	Herget (1–1)	Strahm (3)	Angel Stadium	26,587	30–27	W7
58	June 9	@ Angels	2–5	Ohtani (4–4)	Pivetta (5–5)	Iglesias (12)	Angel Stadium	28,595	30–28	L1
59	June 10	@ Mariners	4–3	Diekman (2–0)	Muñoz (1–3)	Houck (1)	T-Mobile Park	27,314	31–28	W1
60	June 11	@ Mariners	6–7	Sewald (3–1)	Robles (1–2)	—	T-Mobile Park	37,691	31–29	L1
61	June 12	@ Mariners	2–0	Danish (2–0)	Sewald (3–2)	Houck (2)	T-Mobile Park	42,900	32–29	W1
62	June 14	Athletics	6–1	Pivetta (6–5)	Koenig (0–2)	—	Fenway Park	32,617	33–29	W2
63	June 15	Athletics	10–1	Winckowski (1–1)	Kaprielian (0–4)	—	Fenway Park	31,877	34–29	W3
64	June 16	Athletics	3–4	Blackburn (6–2)	Hill (2–4)	Jiménez (11)	Fenway Park	30,779	34–30	L1
65	June 17	Cardinals	6–5	Wacha (5–1)	Wainwright (5–5)	Houck (3)	Fenway Park	35,251	35–30	W1
66	June 18	Cardinals	2–11	Hudson (5–3)	Crawford (1–2)	—	Fenway Park	36,141	35–31	L1
67	June 19	Cardinals	6–4	Pivetta (7–5)	Pallante (2–2)	Houck (4)	Fenway Park	35,989	36–31	W1
68	June 20	Tigers	5–2	Winckowski (2–1)	Faedo (1–4)	Houck (5)	Fenway Park	34,811	37–31	W2
69	June 21	Tigers	5–4	Hill (3–4)	Brieske (1–6)	Schreiber (2)	Fenway Park	29,168	38–31	W3
70	June 22	Tigers	6–2	Wacha (6–1)	Skubal (5–5)	—	Fenway Park	35,180	39–31	W4
71	June 24	@ Guardians	6–3	Pivetta (8–5)	Shaw (3–1)	—	Progressive Field	29,106	40–31	W5
72	June 25	@ Guardians	4–2	Winckowski (3–1)	Bieber (3–4)	Houck (6)	Progressive Field	27,239	41–31	W6
73	June 26	@ Guardians	8–3	Hill (4–4)	Civale (2–4)	—	Progressive Field	20,663	42–31	W7
74	June 27	@ Blue Jays	2–7	Gausman (6–6)	Seabold (0–1)	—	Rogers Centre	25,498	42–32	L1
75	June 28	@ Blue Jays	5–6	Romano (2–2)	Danish (2–1)	—	Rogers Centre	27,140	42–33	L2
76	June 29	@ Blue Jays	6–5 (10)	Strahm (3–2)	Phelps (0–2)	—	Rogers Centre	27,601	43–33	W1

July: 8–19 (Home: 6–11; Away: 2–8)

#	Date	Opponent	Score	Win	Loss	Save	Stadium	Attendance	Record	Box/ Streak
77	July 1	@ Cubs	5–6	Hughes (1–0)	Robles (1–3)	Robertson (10)	Wrigley Field	34,931	43–34	L1
78	July 2	@ Cubs	1–3	Leiter Jr. (2–2)	Winckowski (3–2)	Robertson (11)	Wrigley Field	40,298	43–35	L2
79	July 3	@ Cubs	4–2 (11)	Diekman (3–0)	Wick (1–3)	—	Wrigley Field	40,185	44–35	W1
80	July 4	Rays	4–0	Crawford (2–2)	Fleming (2–4)	Schreiber (3)	Fenway Park	36,473	45–35	W2
81	July 5	Rays	4–8	Thompson (2–2)	Pivetta (8–6)	—	Fenway Park	31,113	45–36	L1
82	July 6	Rays	1–7	Kluber (4–5)	Bello (0–1)	—	Fenway Park	33,735	45–37	L2
83	July 7	Yankees	5–6	Cole (8–2)	Winckowski (3–3)	Holmes (16)	Fenway Park	36,876	45–38	L3
84	July 8	Yankees	5–12	Castro (5–0)	Seabold (0–2)	Luetge (1)	Fenway Park	36,841	45–39	L4
85	July 9	Yankees	6–5 (10)	Diekman (4–0)	Peralta (2–2)	—	Fenway Park	36,945	46–39	W1
86	July 10	Yankees	11–6	Sawamura (1–1)	Chapman (0–3)	—	Fenway Park	37,291	47–39	W2
87	July 11	@ Rays	5–10	Bard (1–0)	Diekman (4–1)	—	Tropicana Field	10,629	47–40	L1
88	July 12	@ Rays	2–3	Kluber (5–5)	Strahm (3–3)	Raley (5)	Tropicana Field	10,653	47–41	L2
89	July 13	@ Rays	1–4	McClanahan (10–3)	Winckowski (3–4)	Poche (6)	Tropicana Field	10,458	47–42	L3
90	July 14	@ Rays	4–5	Romero (1–0)	Schreiber (2–1)	Beeks (1)	Tropicana Field	11,998	47–43	L4
91	July 15	@ Yankees	5–4 (11)	Houck (5–3)	King (6–2)	Brasier (1)	Yankee Stadium	47,572	48–43	W1
92	July 16	@ Yankees	1–14	Taillon (10–4)	Pivetta (8–7)	Weber (1)	Yankee Stadium	47,997	48–44	L1
93	July 17	@ Yankees	2–13	Cole (9–2)	Sale (0–1)	—	Yankee Stadium	47,958	48–45	L2
ASG	July 19	All-Star Game	AL 3–2 NL	Valdez (1–0)	Gonsolin (0–1)	Clase (1)	Dodger Stadium	52,518	N/A	N/A
94	July 22	Blue Jays	5–28	Gausman (7–7)	Eovaldi (4–3)	—	Fenway Park	36,796	48–46	L3
95	July 23	Blue Jays	1–4	Manoah (11–4)	Crawford (2–3)	Romano (21)	Fenway Park	35,821	48–47	L4
96	July 24	Blue Jays	4–8	Mayza (4–0)	Bello (0–2)	—	Fenway Park	34,404	48–48	L5
97	July 25	Guardians	3–1	Schreiber (3–1)	Plesac (2–8)	Whitlock (2)	Fenway Park	32,529	49–48	W1
98	July 26	Guardians	3–8	McCarty (1–2)	Winckowski (3–5)	—	Fenway Park	32,483	49–49	L1
99	July 27	Guardians	6–7	De Los Santos (2–0)	Houck (5–4)	Clase (21)	Fenway Park	32,919	49–50	L2
100	July 28	Guardians	4–2	Diekman (5–1)	McKenzie (7–7)	Whitlock (3)	Fenway Park	32,122	50–50	W1
101	July 29	Brewers	1–4	Woodruff (9–3)	Bello (0–3)	Hader (29)	Fenway Park	34,193	50–51	L1
102	July 30	Brewers	4–9	Lauer (7–3)	Pivetta (8–8)	—	Fenway Park	35,867	50–52	L2
103	July 31	Brewers	7–2	Winckowski (4–5)	Ashby (2–9)	—	Fenway Park	35,231	51–52	W1

August: 12–16 (Home: 5–7; Away: 7–9)

#	Date	Opponent	Score	Win	Loss	Save	Stadium	Attendance	Record	Box/ Streak
104	August 1	@ Astros	3–2	Eovaldi (5–3)	García (8–7)	Houck (7)	Minute Maid Park	35,185	52–52	W2
105	August 2	@ Astros	2–1	Crawford (3–3)	Javier (6–7)	Houck (8)	Minute Maid Park	31,229	53–52	W3
106	August 3	@ Astros	1–6	Urquidy (10–4)	Hill (4–5)	—	Minute Maid Park	32,295	53–53	L1
107	August 4	@ Royals	3–7	Clarke (3–1)	Hernández (0–1)	—	Kauffman Stadium	18,970	53–54	L2
108	August 5	@ Royals	7–4	Winckowski (5–5)	Greinke (3–7)	—	Kauffman Stadium	21,246	54–54	W1
109	August 6	@ Royals	4–5	Coleman (3–1)	Whitlock (2–2)	—	Kauffman Stadium	19,136	54–55	L1
110	August 7	@ Royals	5–13	Keller (6–12)	Crawford (3–4)	—	Kauffman Stadium	14,949	54–56	L2
111	August 9	Braves	7–9 (11)	Lee (3–0)	Ort (0–1)	Matzek (1)	Fenway Park	34,972	54–57	L3
112	August 10	Braves	4–8	Wright (14–5)	Pivetta (8–9)	—	Fenway Park	35,406	54–58	L4
113	August 11	Orioles	4–3	Davis (2–1)	Kremer (4–4)	Schreiber (4)	Fenway Park	33,927	55–58	W1
114	August 12	Yankees	3–2 (10)	Whitlock (3–2)	Trivino (1–7)	—	Fenway Park	36,434	56–58	W2
115	August 13	Yankees	2–3	Chapman (1–3)	Schreiber (3–2)	Effross (2)	Fenway Park	36,672	56–59	L1
116	August 14	Yankees	3–0	Wacha (7–1)	Taillon (11–3)	Whitlock (4)	Fenway Park	36,581	57–59	W1
117	August 16	@ Pirates	5–3	Pivetta (9–9)	Keller (4–9)	Barnes (3)	PNC Park	19,387	58–59	W2
118	August 17	@ Pirates	8–3	Hill (5–5)	Contreras (3–3)	—	PNC Park	15,231	59–59	W3
119	August 18	@ Pirates	2–8	Brubaker (3–10)	Winckowski (5–6)	—	PNC Park	20,991	59–60	L1
120	August 19	@ Orioles	10–15	Vespi (5–0)	Crawford (5–3)	—	Camden Yards	33,136	59–61	L2
121	August 20	@ Orioles	4–3	Wacha (8–1)	Bradish (1–5)	Whitlock (5)	Camden Yards	34,939	60–61	W1
122	August 21	@ Orioles†	3–5	Pérez (7–1)	Barnes (0–4)	Bautista (8)	Historic Bowman Field	2,467	60–62	L1
123	August 23	Blue Jays	3–9	Stripling (6–3)	Winckowski (5–7)	—	Fenway Park	30,963	60–63	L2
124	August 24	Blue Jays	2–3 (10)	Cimber (10–5)	Brasier (0–3)	Romano (27)	Fenway Park	31,840	60–64	L3
125	August 25	Blue Jays	5–6 (10)	Romano (5–3)	Schreiber (3–3)	—	Fenway Park	30,527	60–65	L4
126	August 26	Rays	9–8	Wacha (9–1)	Yarbrough (1–8)	Whitlock (6)	Fenway Park	30,095	61–65	W1
127	August 27	Rays	5–1	Hill (6–5)	Springs (6–4)	Schreiber (5)	Fenway Park	34,036	62–65	W2
128	August 28	Rays	4–12	Kluber (9–7)	Pivetta (9–10)	—	Fenway Park	29,116	62–66	L1
129	August 29	@ Twins	2–4	Thielbar (3–2)	Bello (0–4)	López (23)	Target Field	19,581	62–67	L2
130	August 30	@ Twins	5–10	Fulmer (5–5)	Crawford (3–6)	—	Target Field	19,909	62–68	L3
131	August 31	@ Twins	6–5	Wacha (10–1)	Ryan (10–7)	Barnes (4)	Target Field	19,337	63–68	W1
†The Red Sox were the away team against the Orioles at the MLB Little League Classic contested in Williamsport, Pennsylvania.

September: 12–14 (Home: 9–4; Away: 3–10)

#	Date	Opponent	Score	Win	Loss	Save	Stadium	Attendance	Record	Box/ Streak
132	September 1	Rangers	9–8	Familia (2–1)	Hernández (1–1)	—	Fenway Park	31,340	64–68	W2
133	September 2	Rangers	9–1	Danish (3–1)	Keuchel (2–9)	—	Fenway Park	31,628	65–68	W3
134	September 3	Rangers	5–3	Bello (1–4)	Santana (3–7)	Schreiber (6)	Fenway Park	31,474	66–68	W4
135	September 4	Rangers	5–2	Ort (1–1)	Dunning (3–8)	Schreiber (7)	Fenway Park	32,422	67–68	W5
136	September 5	@ Rays	3–4	Faucher (2–3)	Familia (2–2)	Fairbanks (5)	Tropicana Field	12,264	67–69	L1
137	September 6	@ Rays	4–8	Cleavinger (1–1)	Hill (6–6)	—	Tropicana Field	8,069	67–70	L2
138	September 7	@ Rays	0–1	Chirinos (1–0)	Pivetta (9–11)	Fairbanks (6)	Tropicana Field	8,696	67–71	L3
139	September 9	@ Orioles	2–3	Reed (2–0)	Bello (1–5)	Tate (4)	Camden Yards	16,451	67–72	L4
140	September 10	@ Orioles	17–4	Wacha (11–1)	Lyles (10–10)	—	Camden Yards	26,050	68–72	W1
141	September 11	@ Orioles	1–0	Hill (7–6)	Bradish (3–6)	Barnes (5)	Camden Yards	16,030	69–72	W2
142	September 13	Yankees	6–7 (10)	Holmes (6–3)	Familia (2–3)	Peralta (4)	Fenway Park	34,250	69–73	L1
143	September 14	Yankees	3–5	Cortés Jr. (10–4)	Bello (1–6)	Holmes (20)	Fenway Park	36,581	69–74	L2
144	September 16	Royals	2–1	Whitlock (4–2)	Coleman (4–2)	Strahm (4)	Fenway Park	33,181	70–74	W1
145	September 17	Royals	0–9	Singer (9–4)	Hill (7–7)	—	Fenway Park	34,925	70–75	L1
146	September 18	Royals	13–3	Pivetta (10–11)	Bubic (2–13)	—	Fenway Park	31,199	71–75	W1
147	September 20	@ Reds	5–3	Bello (2–6)	Lodolo (4–7)	Schreiber (8)	Great American Ball Park	16,698	72–75	W2
148	September 21	@ Reds	1–5	Anderson (2–3)	Seabold (0–3)	Díaz (8)	Great American Ball Park	13,074	72–76	L1
149	September 22	@ Yankees	4–5 (10)	Holmes (7–4)	Ort (1–2)	—	Yankee Stadium	43,123	72–77	L2
150	September 23	@ Yankees	4–5	Loáisiga (2–3)	Strahm (3–4)	—	Yankee Stadium	47,346	72–78	L3
151	September 24	@ Yankees	5–7	Luetge (4–4)	Schreiber (3–4)	Effross (3)	Yankee Stadium	47,611	72–79	L4
152	September 25	@ Yankees	0–2 (6)	Cortés Jr. (11–4)	Bello (2–7)	—	Yankee Stadium	46,707	72–80	L5
153	September 26	Orioles	8–14	Watkins (5–6)	Seabold (0–4)	—	Fenway Park	25,634	72–81	L6
154	September 27	Orioles	13–9	Strahm (4–4)	Krehbiel (5–5)	—	Fenway Park	30,765	73–81	W1
155	September 28	Orioles	3–1	Hill (8–7)	Kremer (8–6)	Barnes (6)	Fenway Park	33,073	74–81	W2
156	September 29	Orioles	5–3	Kelly (1–0)	Tate (4–4)	Ort (1)	Fenway Park	29,779	75–81	W3
157	September 30	@ Blue Jays	0–9	Manoah (16–7)	Pivetta (10–12)	Kikuchi (1)	Rogers Centre	37,283	75–82	L1

October: 3–2 (Home: 3–0; Away: 0–2)

#	Date	Opponent	Score	Win	Loss	Save	Stadium	Attendance	Record	Box/ Streak
158	October 1	@ Blue Jays	0–10	Stripling (10–4)	Bello (2–8)	—	Rogers Centre	44,612	75–83	L2
159	October 2	@ Blue Jays	3–6	Pop (4–0)	Wacha (11–2)	Romano (36)	Rogers Centre	43,877	75–84	L3
160	October 3	Rays	4–3	Schreiber (4–4)	Herget (0–1)	Barnes (7)	Fenway Park	26,633	76–84	W1
161	October 4	Rays	6–0 (5)	Eovaldi (6–3)	Springs (9–5)	—	Fenway Park	26,477	77–84	W2
162	October 5	Rays	6–3	Bazardo (1–0)	Fleming (2–5)	Barnes (8)	Fenway Park	26,695	78–84	W3

=== Grand slams ===
No.	Date	Red Sox batter	H/A	Pitcher	Opposing team	Ref.
1	May 1	J. D. Martinez	Away	Travis Lakins Sr.	Baltimore Orioles	
2	May 10	Rafael Devers	Away	Kyle Wright	Atlanta Braves	
3	May 20	Trevor Story	Home	Robbie Ray	Seattle Mariners	
4	May 22	Franchy Cordero	Home	Andrés Muñoz	Seattle Mariners	
5	August 31	Xander Bogaerts	Away	Joe Ryan	Minnesota Twins	
6	September 10	Rafael Devers	Away	Jordan Lyles	Baltimore Orioles	
7	October 4	Xander Bogaerts	Home	Colin Poche	Tampa Bay Rays	

=== Ejections ===
No.	Date	Red Sox personnel	H/A	Opposing team	Ref.
1	May 7	Alex Cora	Home	Chicago White Sox	
2	May 11	Kevin Plawecki	Away	Atlanta Braves	
3	May 11	Alex Cora	Away	Atlanta Braves	
4	August 4	Alex Cora	Away	Kansas City Royals	
5	August 19	Alex Cora	Away	Baltimore Orioles	
6	August 19	Xander Bogaerts	Away	Baltimore Orioles	

== Roster ==
2022 Boston Red Sox
Roster
Pitchers: 32 Matt Barnes; 83 Eduard Bazardo; 66 Brayan Bello; 70 Ryan Brasier; 50 Kutter Crawford; 60 Tyler Danish; 56 Austin Davis; 31 Jake Diekman; 17 Nathan Eovaldi; 31 Jeurys Familia; 48 Michael Feliz; 71 Frank German; 63 Darwinzon Hernández; 44 Rich Hill; 89 Tanner Houck; 76 Zack Kelly; 61 Kaleb Ort; 37 Nick Pivetta; 57 Hansel Robles; 41 Chris Sale; 18 Hirokazu Sawamura; 46 John Schreiber; 67 Connor Seabold; 55 Matt Strahm; 71 Phillips Valdez; 52 Michael Wacha; 72 Garrett Whitlock; 73 Josh Winckowski	Catchers: 3 Reese McGuire; 25 Kevin Plawecki; 7 Christian Vázquez; 74 Connor Wong; Infielders: 3 Jonathan Araúz; 39 Christian Arroyo; 2 Xander Bogaerts; 36 Triston Casas; 12 Yu Chang; 16 Franchy Cordero; 29 Bobby Dalbec; 11 Rafael Devers; 20 Jeter Downs; 35 Eric Hosmer; 47 Yolmer Sánchez; 23 Travis Shaw; 10 Trevor Story	Outfielders: 48 Abraham Almonte; 19 Jackie Bradley Jr.; 43 Jaylin Davis; 40 Jarren Duran; 5 Kiké Hernández; 28 J. D. Martinez; 22 Tommy Pham; 30 Rob Refsnyder; 99 Alex Verdugo	Manager: 13 Alex Cora; Coaches: 87 Michael Brenly (staff assistant); 58 Dave Bush (pitching); 62 Peter Fatse (hitting); 53 Carlos Febles (third base); 81 Andy Fox (field coordinator); 88 Mani Martinez (bullpen catcher); 54 Luis Ortiz (asst hitting); 85 Ben Rosenthal (asst hitting); 33 Jason Varitek (game planning/catching); 84 Ramón Vázquez (first base); 86 Will Venable (bench/outfield); 51 Kevin Walker (bullpen)

== Player stats ==
= Indicates team leader

= Indicates league leader

=== Batting ===
Note: G = Games played; AB = At bats; R = Runs; H = Hits; 2B = Doubles; 3B = Triples; HR = Home runs; RBI = Runs batted in; SB = Stolen bases; BB = Walks; AVG = Batting average; SLG = Slugging average

Player	G	AB	R	H	2B	3B	HR	RBI	SB	BB	AVG	SLG
Alex Verdugo	152	593	75	166	39	1	11	74	1	42	.280	.405
Xander Bogaerts	150	557	84	171	38	0	15	73	8	57	.307	.456
Rafael Devers	141	555	84	164	42	1	27	88	3	50	.295	.521
J. D. Martinez	139	533	76	146	43	1	16	62	0	52	.274	.448
Enrique Hernández	93	361	48	80	24	0	6	45	0	34	.222	.338
Trevor Story	94	357	53	85	22	0	16	66	13	32	.238	.434
Bobby Dalbec	117	317	40	68	9	2	12	39	3	29	.215	.369
Christian Vázquez	84	294	33	83	20	0	8	42	1	18	.282	.432
Christian Arroyo	87	280	32	80	16	1	6	36	5	13	.286	.414
Jackie Bradley Jr.	91	271	21	57	19	1	3	29	2	17	.210	.321
Franchy Cordero	84	242	36	53	17	1	8	29	4	28	.219	.397
Tommy Pham	53	214	32	50	12	0	6	24	1	14	.234	.374
Jarren Duran	58	204	23	45	14	3	3	17	7	14	.221	.363
Kevin Plawecki	60	157	15	34	8	0	1	12	0	14	.217	.287
Rob Refsnyder	57	153	25	47	11	0	6	21	1	15	.307	.497
Reese McGuire	36	98	13	33	5	1	3	12	1	6	.337	.500
Triston Casas	27	76	11	15	1	0	5	12	1	19	.197	.408
Connor Wong	27	48	8	9	3	0	1	7	0	5	.188	.313
Eric Hosmer	14	45	6	11	3	0	0	4	0	4	.244	.311
Jeter Downs	14	39	4	6	1	0	1	4	0	1	.154	.256
Yolmer Sánchez	14	37	1	4	0	0	0	2	0	5	.108	.108
Abraham Almonte	15	35	7	9	2	0	1	2	1	1	.257	.400
Jaylin Davis	12	24	4	8	1	0	0	2	0	3	.333	.375
Yu Chang	11	20	3	3	2	0	0	1	0	5	.150	.250
Travis Shaw	7	19	0	0	0	0	0	0	0	0	.000	.000
Jonathan Araúz	6	10	1	0	0	0	0	1	0	0	.000	.000
Team totals	162	5539	735	1427	352	12	155	704	52	478	.258	.409

=== Pitching ===
Note: W = Wins; L = Losses; ERA = Earned run average; G = Games pitched; GS = Games started; SV = Saves; IP = Innings pitched; H = Hits allowed; R = Runs allowed; ER = Earned runs allowed; BB = Walks allowed; SO = Strikeouts

Player	W	L	ERA	G	GS	SV	IP	H	R	ER	BB	SO
Nick Pivetta	10	12	4.56	33	33	0	179.2	175	91	91	73	175
Michael Wacha	11	2	3.32	23	23	0	127.1	111	49	47	31	104
Rich Hill	8	7	4.27	26	26	0	124.1	125	67	59	37	109
Nathan Eovaldi	6	3	3.87	20	20	0	109.1	115	55	47	20	103
Garrett Whitlock	4	2	3.45	31	9	6	78.1	65	32	30	15	82
Kutter Crawford	3	6	5.47	21	12	0	77.1	81	49	47	29	77
Josh Winckowski	5	7	5.89	15	14	0	70.1	85	47	46	27	44
John Schreiber	4	4	2.22	64	0	8	65.0	45	19	16	19	74
Ryan Brasier	0	3	5.78	68	0	1	62.1	68	43	40	13	64
Tanner Houck	5	4	3.15	32	4	8	60.0	49	22	21	22	56
Brayan Bello	2	8	4.71	13	11	0	57.1	75	34	30	27	55
Austin Davis	2	1	5.47	50	3	0	54.1	56	36	33	29	61
Hirokazu Sawamura	1	1	3.73	49	0	0	50.2	45	23	21	27	40
Matt Strahm	4	4	3.83	50	0	4	44.2	38	24	19	17	52
Tyler Danish	3	1	5.13	32	0	0	40.1	40	24	23	12	32
Matt Barnes	0	4	4.31	44	0	8	39.2	36	22	19	21	34
Jake Diekman	5	1	4.23	44	0	1	38.1	27	22	18	30	51
Kaleb Ort	1	2	6.35	25	0	1	28.1	35	23	20	15	27
Hansel Robles	1	3	5.84	26	0	2	24.2	25	19	16	14	21
Connor Seabold	0	4	11.29	5	5	0	18.1	35	24	23	8	19
Eduard Bazardo	1	0	2.76	12	0	0	16.1	12	5	5	4	11
Phillips Valdez	0	1	4.41	13	0	0	16.1	12	11	8	7	13
Zack Kelly	1	0	3.95	13	0	0	13.2	14	6	6	4	11
Jeurys Familia	1	2	6.10	10	0	0	10.1	10	8	7	7	8
Darwinzon Hernández	0	1	21.60	7	0	0	6.2	14	17	16	8	9
Chris Sale	0	1	3.18	2	2	0	5.2	5	3	2	1	5
Franklin German	0	0	18.00	5	0	0	4.0	7	8	8	4	4
Michael Feliz	0	0	2.70	1	0	0	3.1	1	2	1	2	4
Yolmer Sanchez	0	0	9.00	1	0	0	1.0	3	1	1	0	0
Jackie Bradley Jr.	0	0	9.00	1	0	0	1.0	1	1	1	3	1
Reese McGuire	0	0	0.00	1	0	0	1.0	0	0	0	0	0
Kevin Plawecki	0	0	0.00	1	0	0	1.0	1	0	0	0	0
Team totals	78	84	4.53	162	162	39	1431.0	1411	787	721	526	1346

=== MLB debuts ===
Red Sox players who made their MLB debuts during the 2022 regular season:

- May 28: Josh Winckowski
- June 22: Jeter Downs
- July 6: Brayan Bello
- August 29: Zack Kelly
- September 4: Triston Casas
- September 17: Frank German

=== Transactions ===
Notable transactions of/for players on the 40-man roster during the 2022 regular season:

- On April 28, the team claimed outfielder Jaylin Davis off waivers from the San Francisco Giants; he was added to Boston's active roster the following day, as Travis Shaw was designated for assignment by the team. Shaw subsequently declined a minor-league assignment and became a free agent.
- On May 14, Davis was designated for assignment to create room on the roster as Rich Hill returned from the COVID-related list. Davis was later sent outright to Triple-A Worcester.
- On June 10, the team added Rob Refsnyder to the roster; Jonathan Araúz was designated for assignment in a corresponding move. Araúz was later claimed off waivers by the Baltimore Orioles.
- On June 18, the team acquired pitcher James Norwood from the Philadelphia Phillies for cash considerations.
- On June 20—the effective date of MLB limiting teams to carrying 13 pitchers on their 26-player active rosters—the team designated Norwood for assignment, and added infielder Jeter Downs to the active roster. Norwood later cleared waivers and was sent outright to Worcester.
- On June 30, the team traded pitcher Silvino Bracho to the Atlanta Braves for cash considerations. Bracho had been added to Boston's active roster for a series in Toronto, but did not make an appearance. He was designated for assignment, then traded.
- On July 5, following a loss to the Tampa Bay Rays, the team designated relief pitcher Hansel Robles for assignment, and released him on July 9.
- On July 9, as part of a number of roster moves, the team added relief pitcher Kaleb Ort to the roster; Michael Feliz was designated for assignment in a corresponding move. Feliz then declined a minor-league assignment, electing to become a free agent.
- Only July 26, the team designated relief pitcher Phillips Valdéz for assignment. He was subsequently claimed off waivers by the Seattle Mariners.
- On August 1, the day before the MLB trade deadline, the team made three trades:
  - Acquired outfielder Tommy Pham from the Cincinnati Reds for a player to be named later; minor-league infielder Nicholas Northcut was later sent to the Reds to complete the trade.
  - Sent catcher Christian Vázquez to the Houston Astros for two minor-league players (Enmanuel Valdez and Wilyer Abreu).
  - Sent relief pitcher Jake Diekman to the Chicago White Sox for catcher Reese McGuire and a player to be named later or cash. On August 31, the White Sox sent minor-league pitcher Taylor Broadway to the Red Sox to complete the trade.
- On August 2, the team acquired first baseman Eric Hosmer, two minor-league players (Max Ferguson and Corey Rosier), and cash considerations from the San Diego Padres in exchange for minor-league pitcher Jay Groome.
- On August 4, the team released outfielder Jackie Bradley Jr. He later signed with the Toronto Blue Jays.
- On August 13, the team added reliever Jeurys Familia to the roster. Familia had signed a minor-league contract on August 9, after being released by the Phillies.
- On August 16, Yolmer Sánchez was designated for assignment, to make room for the return of Kiké Hernández from the 60-day injured list. Two days later, Sánchez was claimed off waivers by the New York Mets.
- On August 29, the team designated for assignment pitchers Austin Davis and Hirokazu Sawamura, and in their place added Zack Kelly to the roster and recalled Kaleb Ort from Worcester. Davis was later claimed off waivers by the Minnesota Twins; Sawamura was sent outright to Worcester.
- On September 7, the team selected the contract of Abraham Almonte from Worcester, to provide outfield depth as Franchy Cordero was placed on the 60-day injured list.
- On September 12, the team claimed infielder Yu Chang off waivers from Tampa Bay; in a corresponding move, Jaylin Davis was designated for assignment. Davis was subsequently sent outright to Worcester.
- On September 14, the team designated Jeurys Familia for assignment and added Yu Chang to the active roster. Familia later clear waivers and declined a minor-league assignment, electing to become a free agent.
- On September 17, the team designated catcher Kevin Plawecki for assignment and added pitcher Frank German to the roster. Plawecki was released two days later; he was subsequently signed by the Texas Rangers.
- On October 5, the team claimed pitcher Easton McGee off waivers from Tampa Bay.

=== Amateur draft ===
Boston had the 24th overall selection in the 2022 MLB draft, held July 17–19. The draft consisted of a total of 616 selections over 20 rounds. Boston's first 10 selections are listed below. The team selected a total of 13 pitchers in the draft. The team signed each of their top ten selections before the August 1 deadline.

Round	Pick	Player	Position	B/T	Class	School (sorts by state)	Signing date
1	24	Mikey Romero	SS	L/R	HS Sr.	Orange Lutheran High School (CA)	July 26
2	41	Cutter Coffey	SS	R/R	HS Sr.	Liberty High School (CA)	July 26
2†	79	Roman Anthony	OF	L/R	HS Sr.	Marjory Stoneman Douglas High School (FL)	July 29
3	99	Dalton Rogers	P	R/L	4YR Jr.	Southern Miss	July 29
4	129	Chase Meidroth	SS	R/R	4YR Sr.	San Diego	July 29
5	159	Noah Dean	P	L/L	4YR Jr.	Old Dominion	July 27
6	189	Alex Hoppe	P	R/R	4YR 5th-year Sr.	UNC Greensboro	July 26
7	219	Caleb Bolden	P	R/R	4YR 5th-year Sr.	TCU	July 26
8	249	Jonathan Brand	P	R/R	4YR Sr.	Miami of Ohio	July 26
9	279	Brooks Brannon	C	R/R	HS Sr.	Randleman High School (NC)	July 29

† Compensatory round selection

== Awards and honors ==
Recipient	Award	Date awarded	Ref.
Trevor Story	AL Player of the Week (May 16–22)	May 23, 2022	
Rafael Devers	All-Star Starting 3B	July 8, 2022	
Xander Bogaerts	All-Star Reserve SS	July 10, 2022	
J. D. Martinez	All-Star Reserve DH	July 12, 2022	
Xander Bogaerts	AL Player of the Week (Aug. 29 – Sept. 4)	September 6, 2022	
J. D. Martinez	AL Player of the Week (Sept. 26 – Oct. 2)	October 6, 2022	
Xander Bogaerts	AL Silver Slugger Award SS	November 10, 2022	

Rafael Devers was named a finalist for the Hank Aaron Award; the winner, Aaron Judge of the Yankees, was selected through a combination of fan balloting and voting by a panel of Hall of Fame inductees. Devers was also a Silver Slugger Award finalist.

Xander Bogaerts and Jackie Bradley Jr. (who finished the season with Toronto) were Gold Glove Award nominees.

Devers and Bogaerts were both nominated for the All-MLB Team.

== Farm system ==
Minor-league managerial staffs were announced in early February 2022. In March, Major League Baseball announced that Minor League Baseball would resume its use of historical league names, which were in use prior to the reorganization of the minor leagues for the 2021 season. Thus, regional league names used during 2021 (such as High-A East) were discontinued after only a single season. Additionally, the classification level known as Low-A during 2021 was reset to Single-A.

In May 2022, the Red Sox had five players included on the list of baseball's top 100 prospects by Baseball America: Marcelo Mayer (14th), Triston Casas (18th), Nick Yorke (33rd), Jarren Duran (84th), and Brayan Bello (97th).

Level	Team	League	Division	Manager	Record	Notes
Triple-A	Worcester Red Sox	International League	East	Chad Tracy	75–73 (.507)	
Double-A	Portland Sea Dogs	Eastern League	Northeast	Chad Epperson	75–63 (.543)	Second-half division winner; lost in semi-finals
High-A	Greenville Drive	South Atlantic League	South	Iggy Suarez	52–78 (.400)	
Single-A	Salem Red Sox	Carolina League	North	Luke Montz	64–66 (.492)	
Rookie	FCL Red Sox	Florida Complex League	South	Jimmy Gonzalez; Tom Kotchman	35–20 (.636)	
Rookie	DSL Red Sox Blue	Dominican; Summer League	North	Ozzie Chavez	44–16 (.733)	Division winner; lost in semi-finals
Rookie	DSL Red Sox Red	Dominican; Summer League	North	Sandy Madera	36–23 (.610)	
