= Ben Rosenthal =

Ben Rosenthal may refer to:

- Benjamin Stanley Rosenthal (1923–1983), Congressman from New York
- Ben Rosenthal (baseball) (born 1979), American baseball coach
- Ben Rosenthal (politician) (1898-1953), American politician in California
