= Tyler Danish =

American baseball player (born 1994)

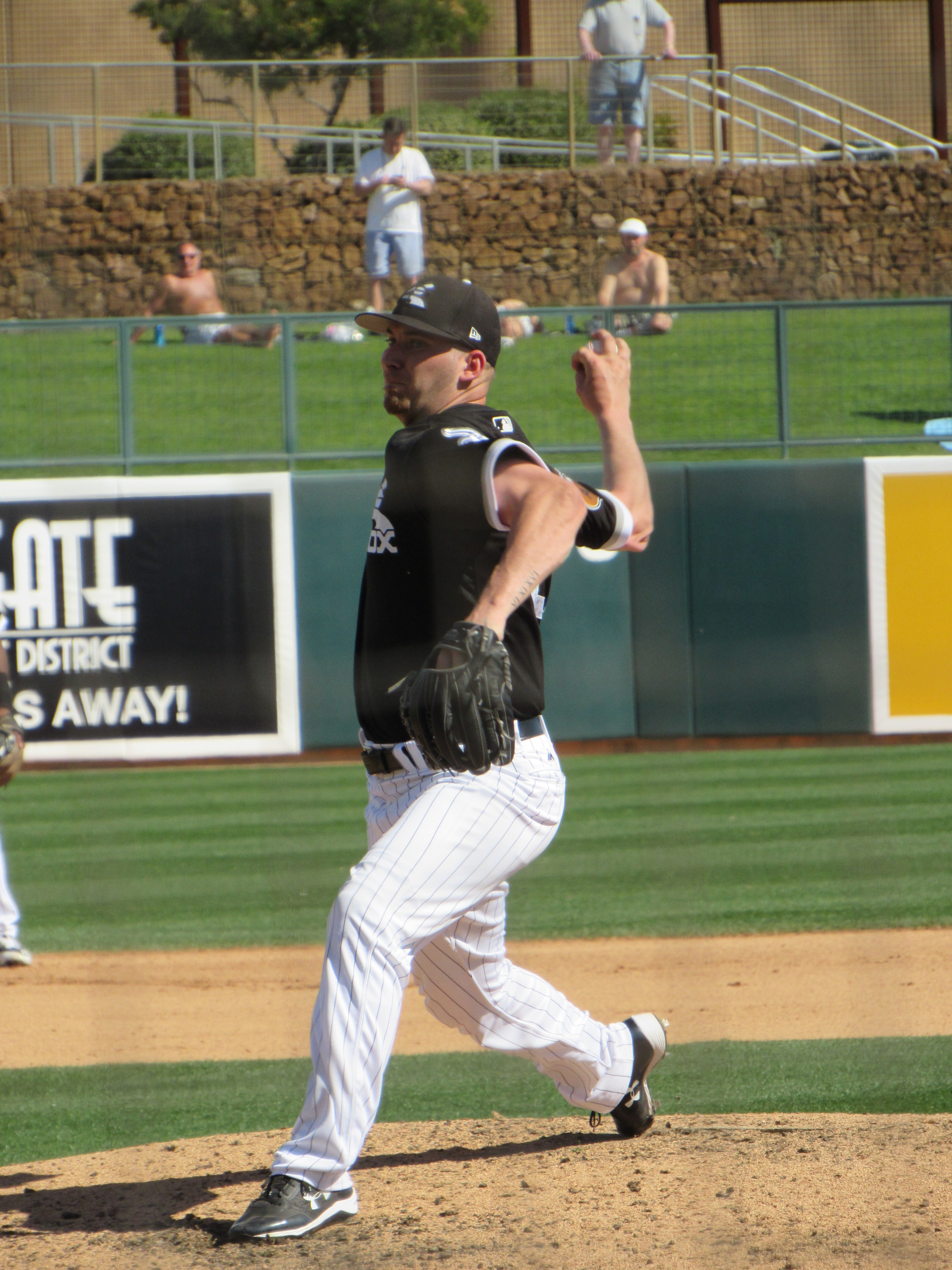
- Danish with the Chicago White Sox during spring training in 2017

Olmecas de Tabasco – No. 15
- Pitcher
- Born: September 12, 1994 (age 31); Valrico, Florida, U.S.
- Bats: Right Throws: Right

MLB debut
- June 11, 2016, for the Chicago White Sox

MLB statistics (through 2022 season)
- Win–loss record: 5–1
- Earned run average: 5.06
- Strikeouts: 43
- Stats at Baseball Reference

Teams
- Chicago White Sox (2016–2018); Boston Red Sox (2022)

Tyler Michael Danish (born September 12, 1994) is an American professional baseball pitcher for the Olmecas de Tabasco of the Mexican League. He has previously played in Major League Baseball (MLB) for the Chicago White Sox and Boston Red Sox.

== Career ==
Danish attended Durant High School in Plant City, Florida. As a senior in 2013, he did not allow an earned run in 94 innings pitched. In addition to his 0.00 earned run average (ERA), he registered 156 strikeouts, one of the five best high school hurlers in the nation that year. Danish was drafted by the Chicago White Sox in the second round of the 2013 MLB draft.

=== Chicago White Sox ===
Danish made his professional debut in 2013 with the Bristol White Sox. He finished the season with the Kannapolis Intimidators. That year, Baseball America named him "Closest to the Majors" along with pitcher Brad Goldberg. Danish started 2014 back with Kannapolis. After posting a 0.71 ERA in seven starts, he was promoted to the Winston-Salem Dash.

Danish began the 2016 season with the Double-A Birmingham Barons. On June 9, Danish was promoted to play for the major-league White Sox for the first time. In his MLB debut, Danish pitched two-thirds of an inning against the Kansas City Royals on June 11, where he gave up one earned run on three hits. Danish pitched in two more games, on consecutive days, compiling a 10.80 ERA in 1 2/3 innings pitched with the White Sox. On June 14, he was optioned to the White Sox' Triple-A affiliate, the Charlotte Knights of the International League. In five starts with the Knights, Danish posted a 1–3 record with a 5.83 ERA and 21 strikeouts in 29 1/3 innings pitched.

In 2017, Danish made a single appearance with the White Sox, serving as the 26th man on the roster and starting the first game of a doubleheader against the Detroit Tigers on May 27. In his first major league start, Danish also received his first decision, a win, by pitching five shutout innings en route to a 3–0 Chicago victory; he struck out six batters while allowing three hits. A day later, Danish was optioned back to Charlotte.

Danish began the 2018 season with Charlotte before he was promoted to the major leagues on July 27. In seven appearances with the White Sox, he recorded one win along with a 7.11 ERA while striking out five batters in 6 1/3 innings. He elected free agency on October 2, 2018. Overall in parts of three seasons with the White Sox, Danish made 11 MLB appearances, registering a 2–0 record with 4.85 ERA while striking out 11 batters in 13 innings pitched.

=== Seattle Mariners ===
On December 18, 2018, Danish signed a minor-league contract with the Seattle Mariners. In six appearances (four starts) with the Tacoma Rainiers of the Pacific Coast League, he had an 0–4 record with a 21.26 ERA. He was released on May 24, 2019.

=== New Britain Bees ===
On June 19, 2019, Danish signed with the New Britain Bees of the Atlantic League of Professional Baseball, an independent baseball league. In 19 relief appearances, he pitched to a 4–2 record with a 6.08 ERA. He became a free agent after the season.

=== Sioux Falls Canaries ===
On April 4, 2020, Danish signed with the Sussex County Miners of the independent Frontier League. On August 5, 2020, Danish signed with the Sioux Falls Canaries of the American Association. In seven appearances (six starts) with Sioux Falls, he had a 4–0 record with a 2.13 ERA. On October 27, 2020, Danish was returned to Sussex County.

=== Los Angeles Angels ===
On May 19, 2021, before the start of the Frontier League season, Danish signed a minor league contract with the Los Angeles Angels organization. In 32 total appearances split between the Triple–A Salt Lake Bees and Double–A Rocket City Trash Pandas, he pitched primarily in relief and had a 5–3 record with a 3.84 ERA while striking out 79 batters in 70 1/3 innings pitched.

=== Boston Red Sox ===
On February 20, 2022, Danish signed a minor-league deal with the Boston Red Sox, including an invitation to major-league spring training. On April 4, the team selected his contract from the Triple-A Worcester Red Sox, adding him to Boston's 40-man roster. He was returned to Worcester on April 29 and removed from the 40-man roster. He was recalled to Boston on May 8, when Michael Wacha was placed on the injured list. On July 7, Danish was placed on the injured list due to a right forearm strain. On August 28, he was activated and optioned back to Triple-A. Danish was recalled to Boston on September 2, when Zack Kelly was placed on the paternity list, and returned to Worcester on October 1. In 32 relief appearances with Boston during 2022, Danish compiled a 3–1 record with 5.13 ERA while striking out 32 batters in 40 1/3 innings. On October 31, Danish elected minor-league free agency, after being placed on waivers and removed from the 40-man roster by the Red Sox.

=== Washington Nationals ===
On December 29, 2022, Danish signed a minor league contract with the New York Yankees, with an invitation to spring training. Danish was released by the Yankees organization on March 31, 2023.

On May 1, 2023, Danish signed a minor league contract with the Washington Nationals organization. In 26 games for the Triple–A Rochester Red Wings, he recorded a 3.72 ERA with 20 strikeouts and 5 saves in 29.0 innings of work. On July 14, Danish opted out of his contract and elected free agency.

=== Olmecas de Tabasco ===
On March 14, 2024, Danish signed with the Olmecas de Tabasco of the Mexican League. He made one start for Tabasco, tossing six innings and allowing one unearned run with four strikeouts. On April 23, Danish was released by the Olmecas.

=== Colorado Rockies ===
On April 24, 2024, Danish signed a minor league contract with the Colorado Rockies organization. In 11 games (10 starts) for the Triple–A Albuquerque Isotopes, he struggled to a 1–6 record and 7.71 ERA with 26 strikeouts across 36 2/3 innings pitched. Danish was released by the Rockies on July 14.

=== Olmecas de Tabasco (second stint) ===
On July 22, 2024, Danish signed with the Olmecas de Tabasco of the Mexican League. He made 3 appearances (2 starts) for Tabasco, registering a 1–1 record and 1.32 ERA with 13 strikeouts across 13 2/3 innings pitched.

In 2025, he returned for a second season with Tabasco. In 18 starts 91.2 innings he went 4-3 with a 3.53 ERA with more walks (47) than strikeouts (39).

== Personal ==
Danish's father, who was serving time in prison for fraud, died of cancer in 2010.
