= Frank German =

American baseball player (born 1997)

- Pitcher
- Born: September 22, 1997 (age 29); Queens, New York, U.S.
- Batted: Right Threw: Right

MLB debut
- September 17, 2022, for the Boston Red Sox

Last MLB appearance
- October 2, 2022, for the Boston Red Sox

MLB statistics
- Win–loss record: 0–0
- Earned run average: 18.00
- Strikeouts: 4
- Stats at Baseball Reference

Teams
- Boston Red Sox (2022)

Franklin German (born September 22, 1997) is an American former professional baseball pitcher. He has previously played in Major League Baseball (MLB) for the Boston Red Sox.

== Career ==
=== Amateur career ===
German graduated from Bishop McLaughlin Catholic High School in Spring Hill, Florida. He enrolled at University of North Florida and played college baseball for the North Florida Ospreys. In 2017, he played collegiate summer baseball with the Wareham Gatemen of the Cape Cod Baseball League.

=== New York Yankees ===
The New York Yankees selected German in the fourth round of the 2018 MLB draft. He spent his first professional season with the Gulf Coast Yankees and Staten Island Yankees. In 2019, German played with the Gulf Coast Yankees and Tampa Tarpons. He did not play in a game in 2020 due to the cancellation of the minor league season because of the COVID-19 pandemic.

=== Boston Red Sox ===
On January 25, 2021, the Yankees traded German and Adam Ottavino to the Boston Red Sox for a player to be named later. German pitched during 2021 with the Portland Sea Dogs of Double-A and started 2022 with Portland before being promoted to the Worcester Red Sox of Triple-A during the season. On September 17, the Red Sox added German to their active roster. He made his major-league debut that day, allowing four runs without retiring a batter while facing four batters in relief. In 43 minor-league relief appearances, he posted a 5–2 record with seven saves and a 2.72 earned run average (ERA) while striking out 64 batters in 49 2/3 innings. German was named the minor-league Relief Pitcher of the Year by the Red Sox organization.

On January 30, 2023, German was designated for assignment in order for the Red Sox to add newly acquired relief pitcher Richard Bleier to the 40-man roster.

=== Chicago White Sox ===
On February 3, 2023, German was traded to the Chicago White Sox in exchange for Theo Denlinger. German was optioned to the Triple-A Charlotte Knights to begin the 2023 season. In 9 appearances for Charlotte, he struggled to a 7.15 ERA with 16 strikeouts in 11 1/3 innings pitched. On May 2, German was designated for assignment by Chicago.

=== Cincinnati Reds ===
On May 8, 2023, German was claimed off waivers by the Cincinnati Reds and optioned to the Triple-A Louisville Bats. In 10 games for Louisville, German struggled to an 8.64 ERA with 13 strikeouts in 8 1/3 innings pitched. On June 5, German was designated for assignment following the promotion of Andrew Abbott. He cleared waivers and was sent outright to Triple-A the following day. He was released by the Reds organization on July 13.

=== Boston Red Sox (second stint) ===
On July 26, 2023, German signed a minor league contract to return to the Red Sox organization. He made five relief appearances for Red Sox farm teams. He was later named a non-roster invitee to the team's 2024 spring training. German was released by the Red Sox organization on March 27.
