= Austin Davis (pitcher) =

American baseball player (born 1993)

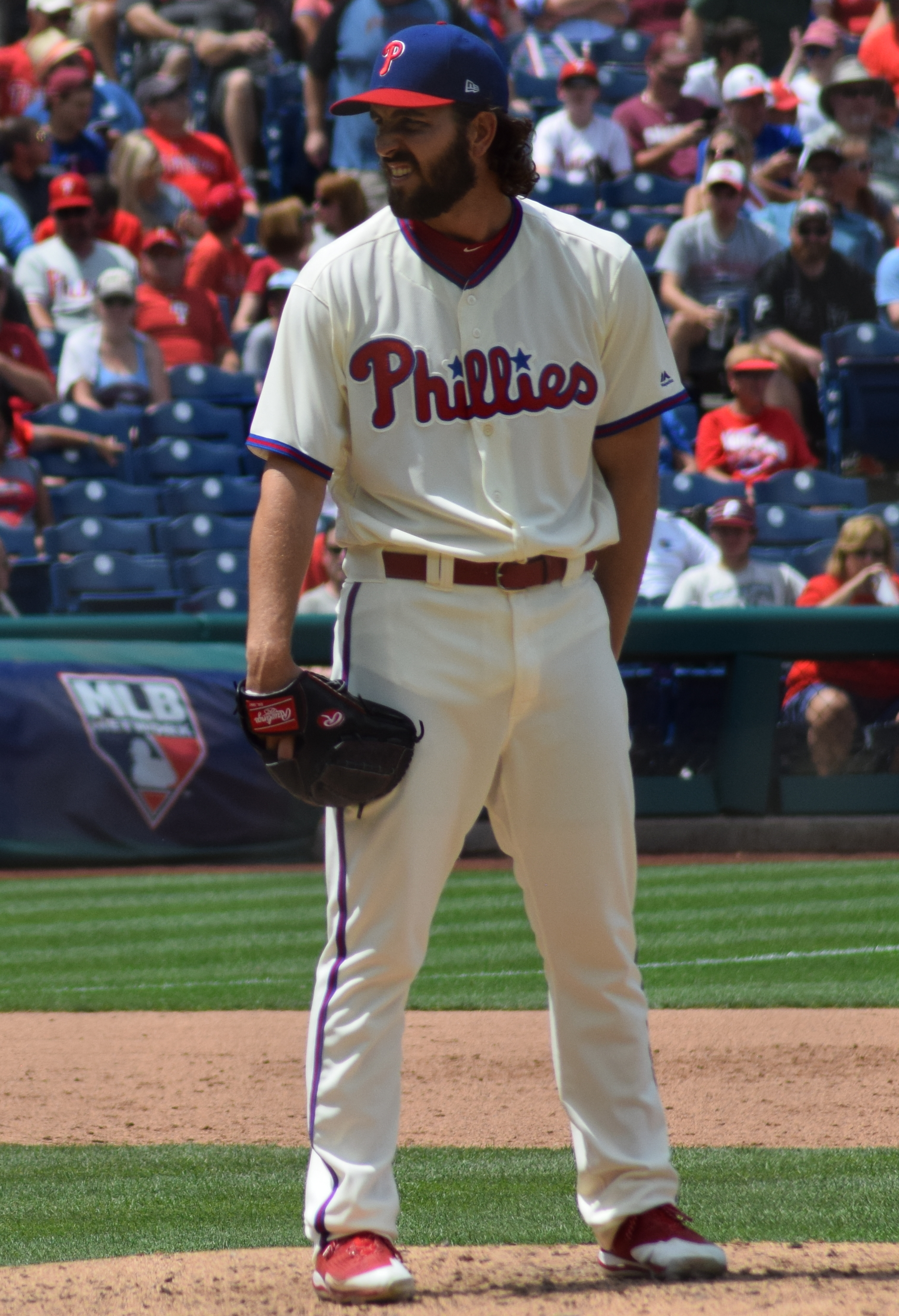
- Davis with the Philadelphia Phillies in 2018

Free agent
- Pitcher
- Born: February 3, 1993 (age 33); Scottsdale, Arizona, U.S.
- Bats: Left Throws: Left

MLB debut
- June 20, 2018, for the Philadelphia Phillies

MLB statistics (through 2024 season)
- Win–loss record: 4–5
- Earned run average: 5.77
- Strikeouts: 165
- Stats at Baseball Reference

Teams
- Philadelphia Phillies (2018–2020); Pittsburgh Pirates (2020–2021); Boston Red Sox (2021–2022); Minnesota Twins (2022); San Diego Padres (2024)

Austin Richard Davis (born February 3, 1993), nicknamed "Big Fudge", is an American professional baseball pitcher who is a free agent. He has previously played in Major League Baseball (MLB) for the Philadelphia Phillies, Pittsburgh Pirates, Boston Red Sox, Minnesota Twins, and San Diego Padres. He was selected by the Phillies in the 12th round of the 2014 MLB draft and made his major league debut for them in 2018.

== Early life ==
Davis was born to Rick and Jeri Davis and grew up in Scottsdale, Arizona, where he was born. He attended Desert Mountain High School in Scottsdale, where he played baseball and was a first team All-Region and All-City.

Davis attended California State University, Bakersfield, and he played college baseball for the Cal State Bakersfield Roadrunners and majored in business. In two seasons with the Roadrunners, Davis posted a 5–10 win–loss record with a 4.56 earned run average (ERA) and 95 strikeouts over 28 appearances (28 starts). The Philadelphia Phillies selected Davis in the 12th round of the 2014 MLB draft.

== Professional career ==
=== Philadelphia Phillies ===
==== Minor leagues ====
After signing, Davis made his professional debut in 2014 with the Rookie Gulf Coast League Phillies where he was 1–1 with three saves and a 2.59 ERA and 27 strikeouts in 31 1/3 innings pitched. In 2015, he played for the Single–A Lakewood BlueClaws with whom he pitched to a 5–6 record with a 3.76 ERA in 33 games (11 starts) with 81 strikeouts in 95 2/3 innings.

In 2016, he split time between Lakewood and the High–A Clearwater Threshers. In 13 relief innings pitched for Lakewood, Davis was 1–0 with one save and 17 strikeouts and did not give up an earned run, averaging 11.8 strikeouts per 9 innings, and in 15 1/3 innings pitched for Clearwater, he was 0–1 with one save and a 5.28 ERA with 18 strikeouts in 15 1/3 innings, averaging 10.6 strikeouts per 9 innings. He missed the first two months of the season due to injury.

Davis spent 2017 with both Clearwater and the Double-A Reading Fightin Phils, pitching to a 6–2 record with two saves and a 2.60 ERA and 75 strikeouts in 69 1/3 innings in 42 relief appearances between both clubs. He began 2018 with Reading and was promoted to the Triple-A Lehigh Valley IronPigs on June 1. Between the two teams, in 2018, he was 1–2 with a 2.82 ERA and 50 strikeouts in 38 1/3 innings, averaging 11.7 strikeouts per 9 innings.

In 2019 for Lehigh Valley, Davis was 4–1 with three saves and a 2.75 ERA, in 37 relief appearances in which he pitched 52 1/3 innings and struck out 64 batters, averaging 11.0 strikeouts per 9 innings. He was an International League mid-season All Star.

==== Major leagues ====
Philadelphia promoted Davis to the major leagues on June 18, 2018. He made his MLB debut on June 20 against the St. Louis Cardinals. He was the first Cal State Bakersfield baseball player to play in Major League Baseball. He finished the season with a 1–2 record with the Phillies, along with a 4.15 ERA and 38 strikeouts over the course of 32 appearances (34 2/3 innings pitched), averaging 9.9 strikeouts per 9 innings.

In 2019 for the Phillies, Davis was 0–0 with a 6.53 ERA; in 14 relief appearances he pitched 20 2/3 innings and struck out 24 batters, averaging 10.5 strikeouts per 9 innings. During 2020 with the Phillies, Davis made four relief appearances, pitching to a 21.00 ERA without registering a decision. On August 21, 2020, Davis was designated for assignment by the Phillies.

=== Pittsburgh Pirates ===
On August 26, 2020, Davis was traded to the Pittsburgh Pirates for minor-league pitcher Joel Cesar and cash considerations. Davis recorded a 2.45 ERA in five appearances for Pittsburgh through the end of the season. On February 24, 2021, Davis was placed on the 60-day injured list due to a left elbow sprain; he was activated on June 6. Through July, Davis made 10 relief appearances for the Pirates and recorded a 5.59 ERA with a 0–1 record.

=== Boston Red Sox ===
On July 30, 2021, Davis was traded to the Boston Red Sox in exchange for infielder Michael Chavis. Through the end of the regular season, Davis made 19 appearances with Boston, compiling a 1–1 record with 4.86 ERA while striking out 17 batters in 16 2/3 innings. He returned to the Red Sox in 2022, appearing in 50 games (three starts) while compiling a 2–1 record with 5.47 ERA while striking out 61 batters in 54 1/3 innings. On August 29, Davis was designated for assignment.

=== Minnesota Twins ===
On August 31, 2022, Davis was claimed off waivers by the Minnesota Twins. In two relief appearances, he allowed three earned runs in 1 2/3 innings. On September 8, Davis was designated for assignment. He elected free agency after clearing waivers two days later.

=== Houston Astros ===
On November 16, 2022, Davis signed a minor league contract with the Houston Astros. In 20 appearances for the Triple–A Sugar Land Space Cowboys, he struggled immensely to an 11.22 ERA with 34 strikeouts in 25 2/3 innings pitched. He was released by the Astros organization on June 26, 2023.

=== Lake Country DockHounds ===
On August 19, 2023, Davis signed with the Lake Country DockHounds of the American Association of Professional Baseball. In 4 starts for Lake Country, Davis posted a 1–3 record and 4.74 ERA with 28 strikeouts across 19.0 innings of work.

=== San Diego Padres ===
On January 31, 2024, Davis signed a minor league contract with the San Diego Padres. In 29 appearances for the Triple–A El Paso Chihuahuas, he compiled a 3.10 ERA with 37 strikeouts and 8 saves across 29 innings of work. On June 28, the Padres selected Davis' contract, adding him to their major league roster. In 7 appearances, he struggled to a 9.00 ERA with 6 strikeouts across 7 innings of work. Davis was designated for assignment by San Diego on July 31. He cleared waivers and elected free agency on August 4. The next day, Davis re–signed with the Padres organization on a minor league contract. He elected free agency following the season on November 4.

On January 20, 2025, Davis re-signed with the Padres organization on a new minor league contract. He made 11 appearances for El Paso, but struggled to an 11.91 ERA with 12 strikeouts and one save across 11 1/3 innings pitched. Davis was released by San Diego on May 4.
