= Zack Kelly =

American baseball player (born 1995)

Free agent
- Pitcher
- Born: March 3, 1995 (age 31); Roanoke, Virginia, U.S.
- Bats: Right Throws: Right

MLB debut
- August 29, 2022, for the Boston Red Sox

MLB statistics (through 2026 season)
- Win–loss record: 8–8
- Earned run average: 4.04
- Strikeouts: 127
- Stats at Baseball Reference

Teams
- Boston Red Sox (2022–2026)

Zachery Reed Kelly (born March 3, 1995) is an American professional baseball pitcher who is a free agent. He has played for the Boston Red Sox of Major League Baseball (MLB). He made his MLB debut in 2022 with the Red Sox.

== Career ==
=== Amateur career ===
Kelly graduated from Lord Botetourt High School in Daleville, Virginia. He enrolled at Concord University, where he played college baseball in NCAA Division II for the Concord Mountain Lions as a starting pitcher in 2014. After his sophomore year, Kelly transferred to Newberry College, to play for the Newberry Wolves, their Division II baseball team. As a senior in 2017, Kelly had a 3.72 earned run average (ERA) and recorded 94 strikeouts in 82 1/3 innings pitched.

=== Oakland Athletics ===
Unselected in the 2017 MLB draft, Kelly signed with the Oakland Athletics as an undrafted free agent for a $500 signing bonus. He pitched in the rookie-level Arizona League during 2017. The Athletics released Kelly in April 2018. Kelly later said, "My first year I probably paid to play to be honest with you. I definitely lost money."

=== Los Angeles Angels ===
Kelly signed with the Los Angeles Angels organization and played for three teams in the Angels' system, reaching the Class A-Advanced level with the Inland Empire 66ers of the California League; in 18 total relief appearances during the season, he posted a 2.93 ERA and struck out 41 batters in 43 innings pitched. Kelly began the 2019 season with the Mobile BayBears of the Double-A Southern League, and also played one game with Inland Empire, accruing an overall 3–7 record in 21 games (13 starts) with a 4.88 ERA. The Angels released Kelly during the COVID-19 shutdown in 2020. Shortly thereafter, Kelly underwent surgery on his elbow to have a ligament reattached.

=== Boston Red Sox ===
On January 4, 2021, Kelly signed a minor league contract with the Boston Red Sox organization. He spent the year playing for the Double-A Portland Sea Dogs and the Triple-A Worcester Red Sox. He had a 1.69 ERA in 21 relief appearances for Portland before he was promoted to Worcester, where he had a 2.89 ERA in 15 relief appearances. In 2022, the Red Sox invited Kelly to spring training as a non-roster player and he returned to Worcester for the beginning of the season. He accrued a 2.72 ERA for Worcester through August 29, when he was added to Boston's major-league roster. Kelly made his MLB debut that evening, against the Minnesota Twins. He was on the paternity list for three days in early September. In 13 relief appearances with Boston, Kelly pitched to a 1–0 record with 3.95 ERA while striking out 11 batters in 13 2/3 innings. Kelly was the 2022 recipient of the Lou Gorman Award issued by the Red Sox organization.

Kelly began the 2023 season in Boston's bullpen. He was placed on the injured list on April 13 due to right elbow inflammation. Three days later, he was transferred to the 60-day injured list. On May 3, it was announced that Kelly would miss roughly four months after undergoing a successful ulnar nerve transposition revision in his right elbow. He was activated from the injured list on September 24, and successfully pitched for the Red Sox after going 166 days between major league appearances.

Kelly was optioned to Triple–A Worcester to begin the 2024 season. On April 24, he was recalled from Worcester to replace injured pitcher Brayan Bello on the active roster. Kelly was optioned to Triple-A again on May 26 to make room for pitcher Brad Keller, who had just signed a one-year contract with Boston. Kelly was once again promoted to the major-league roster on June 5. He made his first MLB start on June 9 against the Chicago White Sox, pitching two scoreless innings as an opener. Kelly appeared in 49 total games for Boston during the regular season, pitching to a 6-3 record and 3.97 ERA with 61 strikeouts across 56 2/3 innings pitched.

Kelly made 28 appearances out of the bullpen for the Red Sox during the 2025 season, accumulating a 1-3 record and 4.58 ERA with 35 strikeouts across 35 1/3 innings pitched.

Kelly was optioned to Triple-A Worcester to begin the 2026 season. He made 17 total appearances for Boston, posting an 0–2 record and 3.31 ERA with 14 strikeouts across 16 1/3 innings pitched. On July 21, 2026, Kelly was placed on the 60-day injured list due to a stress reaction in his olecranon bone. On November 2, Kelly was designated for assignment by the Red Sox. He cleared waivers and elected free agency on November 6.

== Personal life ==
Kelly is married and resides in South Carolina in the offseason. He and his wife, Brittany, had their first child in September 2022.

Awards
Preceded by Kutter Crawford	Lou Gorman Award; 2022	Succeeded by Brandon Walter
