= Ben Rosenthal (baseball) =

American baseball coach (born 1979)

- Coach
- Born: July 25, 1979 (age 47); Phoenix, Arizona, U.S.
- Bats: Left Throws: Right

Teams
- As coach: Boston Red Sox (2022–2025)

Benjamin Lloyd Rosenthal (born July 25, 1979) is an American professional baseball coach and former player. He most recently served as an assistant hitting coach for the Boston Red Sox of Major League Baseball (MLB). He previously played in Minor League Baseball as a catcher and outfielder from 2003 to 2006.

== Playing career ==
Rosenthal was born in Phoenix, Arizona, and played college baseball for the San Diego State Aztecs baseball team. After being unselected in the Major League Baseball draft, he began his professional playing career in 2003 playing in independent baseball leagues. He played 27 games in the Canadian Baseball League and 19 games in the Northeast League, registering an overall .237 batting average.

Rosenthal played for farm teams of the St. Louis Cardinals during 2004 and 2005, at the Single-A and High-A levels. In 55 games in 2004 he batted .261, and in eight games in 2005 he batted .158. He also spent part of 2005 in the independent Central Baseball League and Canadian American Association. In 2006, Rosenthal completed his playing career by appearing in 77 games in the independent American Association of Professional Baseball, batting .233 with the El Paso Diablos.

Overall, Rosenthal played 63 games in Minor League Baseball, batting .246 with three home runs and 17 runs batted in (RBI), and 198 games in independent leagues, batting .257 with 17 home runs and 98 RBI. Defensively, he primarily played as a catcher, while also seeing time as a corner outfielder and first baseman.

== Coaching career ==
Rosenthal coached at the high school level from 2011 to 2013, then at Point Loma Nazarene University in San Diego from 2014 to 2016. From 2017 through 2021, he coached in the Houston Astros organization, including three seasons as a hitting coach at the Triple-A level. He spent the 2021 season as hitting coach for the Sugar Land Skeeters of Triple-A West.

Rosenthal was named an assistant hitting coach for the Boston Red Sox on December 20, 2021. On October 13, 2025, the Red Sox announced that Rosenthal would not return to the team in 2026.

In 2026, he was named the hitting coach for the El Paso Chihuahuas the Triple-A affiliate of the San Diego Padres.
