= 2023 Baltimore Orioles season =

Major League Baseball team season

2023 Baltimore Orioles
- American League East champions
- League: American League
- Division: East
- Ballpark: Oriole Park at Camden Yards
- City: Baltimore, Maryland
- Record: 101–61 (.623)
- Divisional place: 1st
- Owners: Peter Angelos
- General managers: Mike Elias
- Managers: Brandon Hyde
- Television: MASN (Kevin Brown, Jim Palmer, and Ben McDonald)
- Radio: WBAL-AM; Baltimore Orioles Radio Network (Geoff Arnold, Brett Hollander, and Melanie Newman)

The 2023 Baltimore Orioles season was the 123rd season in Baltimore Orioles franchise history, the 70th in Baltimore, and the 32nd at Oriole Park at Camden Yards. The Baltimore Orioles drew an average home attendance of 23,911 in 81 home games in the 2023 MLB season. The total attendance was 1,936,798.

The Orioles improved on their 83–79 season from 2022, with their 84th win coming on September 2. On September 4, after the Orioles defeated the Los Angeles Angels, they established a new American League record by surpassing the 1922–24 New York Yankees with 84 consecutive series of two-plus games of not being swept. The Orioles tied their win total from 2016 with their win over the Red Sox on September 8, and the win against the St. Louis Cardinals on September 11 ensured that the Orioles won at least one game against all MLB opponents in the regular season. The Orioles clinched a playoff spot with the Texas Rangers' loss on September 17, shortly before their own win over the Tampa Bay Rays. This was Baltimore's first postseason appearance since 2016. On September 28, the Orioles clinched the division title for the first time since the 2014 season, and just the second time since 1997. The win on September 28 also ensured the Orioles would win 100 or more games for the first time since 1980. In the playoffs, the Orioles were upset by the eventual World Series champion Texas Rangers in the American League Division Series, being swept in 3 games.

== Offseason ==
The Orioles finished the 2022 season 83–79, their first season finishing at .500 or above since 2016 but finished 16 games out of 1st and missed the postseason for the sixth consecutive season.

=== Rule changes ===
Pursuant to the CBA, new rule changes will be in place for the 2023 season:

- institution of a pitch clock between pitches;
- limits on pickoff attempts per plate appearance;
- limits on defensive shifts requiring two infielders to be on either side of second and be within the boundary of the infield; and
- larger bases (increased to 18-inch squares);

The most controversial of the rules changes was the addition of a pitch clock. Pitchers would have 15 seconds with the bases empty and 20 seconds with runners on base to pitch the ball, and require the hitter to be "alert" in the batter's box with 8 seconds remaining, or otherwise be charged a penalty ball/strike. Opinions of the clock, designed to hasten the game, were divided with proponents citing fewer lulls in gameplay and detractors citing the demise of the leisurely pace of the sport, elimination of suspenseful build ups in big game situations, and the potential for games to end on a pitch clock penalty.

Jeff Passan tweeted that, through the first four days of the season, average game duration was down 3:09 to 2:38 when compared to the first four days of 2022, a 31-minute reduction. Other observations included:

- There were 40 pitch clock violations through 50 total games
- Stolen base attempts were more frequent and successful (70 stolen on 84 attempts in 2023 compared to 29-of-43 in 2022)
- OPS was up from .682 to .715, observing that this production increase was due to an increase in singles.

=== Awards ===
Following his 2022 campaign, catcher Adley Rutschman was announced as runner-up for 2022 AL Rookie of the Year, finishing behind Seattle's Julio Rodriguez.

Ramón Urías was awarded a Gold Glove for his defensive work at third base in 2022. Toronto's Matt Chapman and Cleveland's José Ramírez were the other finalists for the AL third baseman honor. Cedric Mullins was also a finalist for the center field award, alongside Kansas City's Michael A. Taylor and Cleveland's Myles Straw, who won at that position.

Prospect Heston Kjerstad was named MVP of the Arizona Fall League, an off-season league that provides an environment for top prospects to advance their development. Kjerstad had previously missed significant playing time since being drafted second overall in the 2020 amateur draft due to the cancellation of the 2020 minor league season, a bout of myocarditis in 2021, and a strained hamstring early in 2022.

=== Roster moves ===
==== Arbitration ====
Prior to the filing deadline, the Orioles tendered contracts to all six arbitration-eligible players (i.e. players with between three and six years of major league service time): Outfielder Anthony Santander agreed to $7.4M, outfielder Cedric Mullins agreed to $4.1M, outfielder Austin Hays agreed to $3.2M, shortstop Jorge Mateo agreed to $2M, and reliever Dillon Tate agreed to $1.5M. Only pitcher Austin Voth differed with the Orioles on his $2M request; the Orioles filed at $1.7M. Voth and the Orioles avoided arbitration by agreeing to $1.85M and an option for 2024 worth $2.45M plus escalators.

==== Additions ====
In advance of the Rule 5 draft, the Orioles selected the contracts of five prospects adding them to the 40-man roster. The group was headlined by top pitching prospect Grayson Rodriguez, and included pitchers Noah Denoyer, Seth Johnson, and Drew Rom, and infield prospect Joey Ortiz. During the major league portion of the draft, the Orioles added reliever Andrew Politi, who had been with the Boston Red Sox. The Orioles did not lose any players in the major league portion of the draft, however infielder Jonathan Araúz, who had spent a brief period with the Orioles in 2022 was selected by the New York Mets in the Triple-A portion.

To re-inforce the major league team for 2023, the Orioles came to agreements with three free agents: starting pitcher Kyle Gibson received a one-year contract for $10M, infielder Adam Frazier received a one-year $8M contract, and Mychal Givens re-joined the Orioles on a one-year $4M contract to bolster the back end of the bullpen. Givens was a former Oriole draft pick who previously pitched in parts of six seasons for the Orioles before being traded to Colorado.

Following the loss of back up catcher Robinson Chirinos to free agency, the Orioles acquired replacement veteran backstop James McCann in a trade with the Mets for cash and a player to be named later.

The Orioles acquired starting pitcher Cole Irvin and minor league pitcher Kyle Virbitsky from the Oakland Athletics for shortstop prospect Darrell Hernaiz.

Following the completion of spring training, left-handed reliever Danny Coulombe exercised his right to opt out of his minor league contract with the Minnesota Twins. His contract stipulated that were he not selected to break camp with the Twins and were offered that opportunity with another club, he would be granted his release. The Orioles selected Coloumbe's contract, guaranteeing him a spot with the team on Opening Day. Politi was returned to the Red Sox at the conclusion of Spring Training to open a spot on the reserve roster.

==== Subtractions ====
The Orioles parted ways with four XX(B)-type free agents, defined as players with at least six years of major league service time: catcher Robinson Chirinos, infielder Rougned Odor, first baseman Jesús Aguilar, and starting pitcher Jordan Lyles. The Orioles declined Lyles' option that would pay him $10M in 2023, making him a free agent.

Other major league role-players departing in free agency included pitchers Chris Ellis, Rico Garcia, Louis Head, and Alex Wells, outfielder and former first round pick DJ Stewart, and outfielder Yusniel Diaz, who was the centerpiece of the trade that sent star third baseman Manny Machado to the Dodgers.

On New Year's Eve, the Orioles traded infielder Tyler Nevin to the Detroit Tigers in exchange for cash.

==== Minor Leagues ====
In various waiver claims, the Orioles added catcher Mark Kolozsvary, outfielder Daz Cameron, and first basemen Lewin Díaz and Ryan O'Hearn. All of these players were successfully outrighted to the minor leagues and began the year in AAA Norfolk.

The Orioles added major leaguers Reed Garrett, Josh Lester, Eduard Bazardo and Kyle Dowdy, along with minor league free agents Wandisson Charles and Ofreidy Gómez on minor league contracts, and all were reassigned to the minor leagues following spring camp.

The Orioles also claimed outfielder Jake Cave off of waivers from the Minnesota Twins. The Orioles later attempted to pass Cave through waivers themselves, but was claimed by the Phillies. Cave was elevated to Phillies' opening day left fielder in the aftermath of Rhys Hoskins' season-ending spring training injury.

The Orioles also added major leaguers Curtis Terry, Franchy Cordero, and Nomar Mazara, on minor league pacts, but released all three at the end of spring training. Cordero's strong spring earned him a major league split contract with the Yankees following his release.

On January 11, the Orioles acquired reliever Darwinzon Hernández from the Red Sox for cash considerations. The Orioles designated Hernández for assignment on January 26 after the Orioles acquired Irvin from the Athletics and outrighted him to AAA Norfolk.

Adding to their young international program, the Orioles signed 16-year-old shortstop Luis Almeyda, a native of Paterson, New Jersey, who moved to the Dominican Republic, for $2.3 million, a team record for an international prospect. In all, the Orioles signed 27 players, thirteen for more than $100,000.

On March 12, 20-year old minor leaguer Luis Ortiz died after a battle with cancer. Ortiz, who was originally from Santo Domingo, Dominican Republic, signed with the Orioles in 2019 and pitched in the Dominican Summer League in 2021.

=== Camden Yards ===
In January 2023, the Orioles announced hospitality company Levy would replace Delaware North as the food and beverage partner at Oriole Park at Camden Yards.

On February 1, the Orioles passed on a deadline to exercise a one-time, five-year extension with Maryland Stadium Authority (MSA) to stay at Oriole Park at Camden Yards. The Orioles were under a two-year lease that was to expire on December 31, 2023, and had previously had been on a 30-year lease which expired in 2021. The team and Maryland Governor Wes Moore released a joint statement regarding their commitment to a multi-decade partnership to revitalize Oriole Park at Camden Yards and the surrounding area with the expectation that a long-term deal could be put in place. At the heart of the agreement, a long-term lease would allow the MSA to borrow $600 million for stadium upgrades under a new Maryland law. Governor Moore also made a public appearance at the Orioles' spring training ballpark to promote his commitment to the partnership.

Sport betting was legalized in Maryland after the signing of Maryland General Assembly bill HB940 in 2021, allowing for sports wagering at Camden Yards for the first time. The Orioles partnered with Nevada-based SuperBook Sports to open SuperBook Bar & Restaurant in the place of Dempsey's Brew Pub beginning in 2023.

In March, it was reported that the Orioles were considering sale of the naming rights to Camden Yards. The team intended to secure a deal of ten years for approximately $6–8 million per year.

=== Angelos family controversy ===
Owner Peter Angelos collapsed in 2017 due to the failure of his aortic valve, and established a trust with his wife, Georgia, and two sons Louis and John as co-trustees to manage the family's assets. John was appointed chairman and CEO of the Orioles and Louis took over the Angelos lawfirm.

In June 2022, it was revealed that Louis filed a lawsuit against John, claiming that John was taking steps to seize control of the Orioles against his father's wishes that his mother, brother, and himself share control. Louis also alleged that John intended to sell or move the team to Tennessee where John has a home and his wife's career is headquartered. Further court filings revealed that Louis alleges John and Georgia transferred approximately $65M in assets out of Peter's name and also used these assets to purchase additional stock in the Orioles. In response, Georgia sued Louis claiming he “abused his non-existent power as a successor co-agent purportedly to sell to himself Peter’s law firm” in order to "abscond with Peter’s legacy", according to her attorneys.

John Angelos made a public appearance in January 2023 with Baltimore mayor Brandon Scott to announce a $5M commitment to the CollegeBound Foundation, which empowers students at Baltimore schools to pursue a college degree or other post-secondary option. During the question-and-answer session with reporters, John once again stated that the Orioles would not leave Baltimore as he had in previous rebukes to news of the lawsuit, and controversially invoked Martin Luther King Jr. Day to dodge questions about his future role with ownership of the team.

It was also during this appearance when, unprompted, Angelos offered media members the opportunity to review the Orioles' finances. "I'll show you the financials of the Orioles," he said. "I’ll show you the governance of the Orioles. I’ll show you everything you want to know." When pressed by The Baltimore Sun on Opening Day about his promise to be transparent about the Orioles' finances, he remarked "It’s an interesting concept and I saw that my good friends at The Baltimore Sun wanted to weigh in on that today. When the hedge fund that owns The Baltimore Sun, based in New York City, wants to open their books, I guess we’ll take a look at that. It’s difficult for me to understand what that fascination is."

On February 6, the family dropped all lawsuits against each other.

== Spring training ==
Spring training kicked off for the Orioles at Ed Smith Stadium on February 25, 2023, and concluded on March 27, 2023, with the Orioles playing 32 games (including four split squad matchups).

=== World Baseball Classic ===
Six Orioles participated in the 2023 World Baseball Classic, which provided international fans the opportunity to watch baseball stars across the globe play in high-stakes match-ups for their home countries.

- Cedric Mullins (USA) - 6G, 10AB, 2H, 3R, 1HR, 2RBI, 0BB, 4K
- Anthony Santander (Venezuela) - 5G, 17AB, 6H, 4R, 2HR, 5RBI, 3BB, 2K
- Dean Kremer (Israel) - 1G, 4.0IP, 3H, 4K, 1BB, 0ER
- Darwinzon Hernandez (Venezuela) - 1G, 1.0IP, 1H, 2K, 0BB, 0ER
- Daniel Federman (Israel) - 1G, 1.0IP, 0H, 0K, 0BB, 0ER
- Ryan Long (Great Britain) - 2G, 4.0IP, 5H, 2K, 0BB, 1ER

Anthony Santander played a pivotal role for Team Venezuela in eliminating Team Dominican Republic with a home run, RBI single, and diving catch to rob Jeimer Candelario of a scoring hit of his own.

=== Camp battles ===
The majority of the Orioles' roster was settled before the beginning of spring and played out as follows:

- Catcher: Rutschman would follow his Rookie of the Year runner-up campaign as the primary catcher, with McCann set as the veteran backup. A late oblique strain forced the Orioles to carry Anthony Bemboom as backup on Opening Day with McCann moving to the injured list to start the season.
- First Base: Ryan Mountcastle returned as the primary first baseman, though the Orioles tried out a couple experienced left-handed first basemen including O'Hearn and Diaz. Diaz had an offseason notable for having been designated-for-assignment five times before being outrighted from the Orioles' 40-man roster. Both O'Hearn and Diaz were sent to the minors to begin the season despite strong springs.
- Infield: Top prospect Gunnar Henderson and veteran Adam Frazier were assured positions to begin the season, however fan speculation on the long-term roles of glove-first infielders Urías and Jorge Mateo were fueled by their poor spring offensive numbers and the rise of top infield prospects Ortiz, Jordan Westburg, Coby Mayo and Connor Norby. Henderson's slow spring was also of some concern. Despite the strong competition all four veteran players were tapped for Opening Day, in addition to utility man Terrin Vavra based on his strong Spring play, major league experience, and roster status. Non-roster invitee Josh Lester also made a strong case for himself but was sent to Norfolk to begin the season. The most recent top overall draft pick Jackson Holliday also turned heads in spring camp but had an outside chance of cracking the roster due to his age and experience.
- Outfield: The outfield remained the same as the regular lineup from 2022: Mullins, Santander, Austin Hays, Kyle Stowers, and Ryan McKenna off the bench. Prospects Colton Cowser and Kjerstad also made strong cases for their inclusion.
- Rotation: Gibson was selected to be the Orioles Opening Day starter based on his experience and spring statistics, followed by holdovers Kremer and Kyle Bradish, and newly acquired Irvin. Orioles General Manager Mike Elias expressed early in camp that top pitching prospect Grayson Rodriguez would be the fifth starter, however, Rodriguez was reassigned to minor league camp in favor of Tyler Wells. Spenser Watkins, Bruce Zimmermann, and prospects DL Hall, Rom, and Denoyer were also reassigned. John Means, recovering from Tommy John surgery, was moved to the 60-day injured list.
- Bullpen: The bullpen was the most hotly contested area for the Orioles, with Givens, Félix Bautista, Dillon Tate, and Nick Vespi all suffering from various ailments throughout camp. The Orioles ultimately settled on returning pitchers Voth, Bautista, Bryan Baker, Keegan Akin, Cionel Pérez, late additions Mike Baumann and Logan Gillaspie, and newcomer Coulombe, who was acquired on the final day of camp. Givens and Tate were moved to the 15-day injured list to begin the season, while Vespi, Joey Krehbiel, Yennier Cano, and Seth Johnson were reassigned.

== Regular season ==
=== April ===
The Orioles began the 2023 season with a roadtrip to Fenway Park to battle the Red Sox. Notably, Adley Rutschman was 5-for-5 with a walk in Game 1, Austin Hays followed with another 5-for-5 day in Game 2 and the Orioles stole ten bases in the series, an MLB record through the first two games of a season. The series was also notable for Rafael Devers becoming the first player in MLB history to be call out on strikes due to a pitch violation under the new pace-of-play rules. With Game 2 seemingly won and leading 8–7, outfielder Ryan McKenna dropped the final out of the game, allowing Masataka Yoshida to reach base. Adam Duvall hit the go-ahead game-winning home run two pitches later. The Orioles opening series was highlighted by a dynamic offense, but were plagued by abysmal relief pitching and many defensive miscues, particularly in the outfield.

In Texas, starter Kyle Bradish was removed from the second inning of Game 1 after taking a Jonah Heim line-drive off the foot. Presumptive Game 2 starter Tyler Wells would go on in emergency relief and pitch five hitless innings, leading the O's to a one-hit 2–0 win. Gibson started Game 2 on normal rest, and Grayson Rodriguez was called to make his Major League debut with Bradish going to the 15-day injury list with a foot contusion.

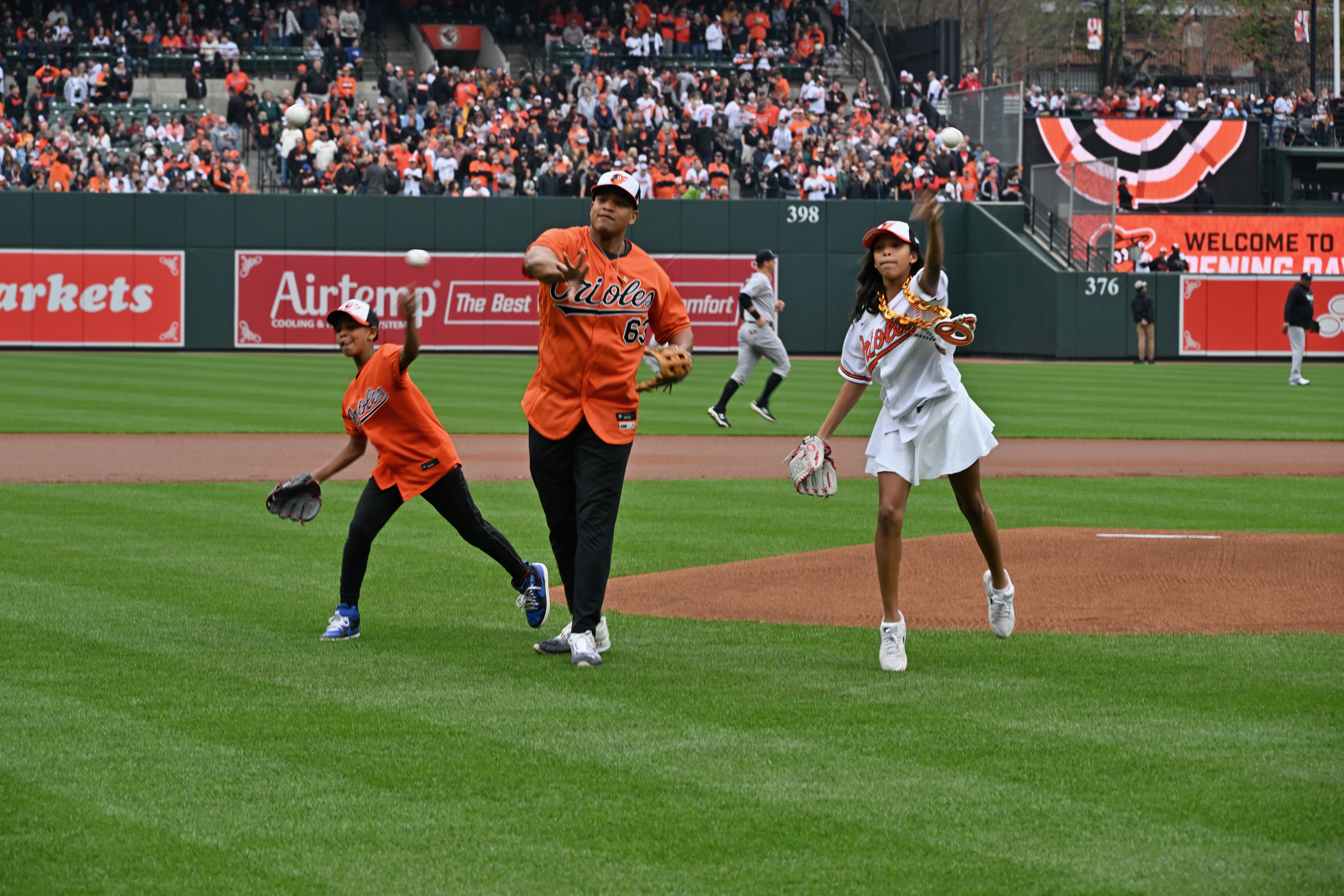
Maryland Governor Wes Moore and his children throw out the first pitch

The Orioles opened at home to a sellout crowd of 45,017, with Dean Kremer starting against the Yankees' Clarke Schmidt. Maryland Governor Wes Moore threw the ceremonial first pitch. The Orioles claimed Game 1, winning 7–6, but lost the remaining two games. They also activated James McCann and demoted Kyle Stowers to Norfolk, with manager Brandon Hyde specifying the desire to get Stowers everyday at-bats. Spring training standout Franchy Cordero, who failed to make the Orioles opening day roster, hit two home runs in the series. Reigning AL MVP Aaron Judge hit two home runs in Game 3. Attendance for the series was 104,799.

The Oakland Athletics visited Oriole Park at Camden Yards for a four-game series. This series saw the introduction of two new "water themed" on-field celebrations: the first, a "human fountain show" where players in the dugout squirt water from their mouths onto the field after an extra-base hit (XBH), and the second, a water funnel dubbed "the homer hose" from which a player must chug a bottle of water after hitting a home run. Gibson handily won Game 1 against the struggling Athletics, while the Orioles piled on 12 runs in Game 2 behind Mountcastle's 9-RBI game, which tied a franchise record. The Orioles lost Game 3 behind a struggling Dean Kremer, but Adley Rutschman secured a series win with a walk-off home run in the bottom of the ninth inning of Game 4. During the series, the Orioles outrighted catcher Anthony Bemboom to Norfolk and promoted left-handed first baseman Ryan O'Hearn. Cole Irvin, following his struggles with command during his no-decision in Game 4, was surprisingly optioned to Norfolk; in response the Orioles recalled Spenser Watkins to take over long relief duty for the club, which had among the most reliever-innings logged across the majors to that point.

The Orioles traveled to Chicago for a three-game series versus the White Sox. Despite holding the Orioles off the board until the seventh inning, Chicago issued nine walks to the Orioles en route to a 6–3 Oriole win in Game 1. The Sox and Orioles traded leads in Game 2, which ended with the Sox walking off after three straight hits against reliever Logan Gillaspie. It was during this game that White Sox reliever Kendall Graveman hit Ramon Urias in the head with a sinker, leaving him in concussion protocol for the remainder of the series. The Orioles took the series in Game 3 after Grayson Rodriguez rebounded from a rocky first inning, winning 8–4.

The 9–7 Orioles visited the Nationals, who were fresh off a 107-loss season the previous year, in Washington, D.C., for a two-game series in which the Orioles held them scoreless over 18 innings. The O's entered the series leading the majors with a .357 on-base percentage (OBP). Kyle Bradish was activated from the injured list to start Game 2 and the Orioles sent down struggling reliever Logan Gillaspie.

The Orioles returned home to Camden Yards on a 26 inning scoreless streak to begin a three-game series against the hapless Detroit Tigers, who were last in the Majors with 57 runs scored. The Tigers ultimately snapped the streak in this series at 34 innings, the longest by an American League team since the 1995 Orioles, but well before the Orioles could reach the club record of 54 scoreless innings set in 1974. Game 2 starter Kyle Gibson matched his career high 11 strikeouts. Yennier Cano, a temporary call up for Keegan Akin going onto the paternity list, retired 17 straight batters since his promotion, the most in club history by a reliever to begin a season since Fred Holdsworth set the club record with 24 in 1976. The Orioles swept the Tigers after a walk-off wild pitch from Mason Englert in the 10th inning of Game 3.

The Boston Red Sox visited Camden Yards for their second series against the Orioles. The Orioles picked up a 5–4 win in Game 1 over the struggling Chris Sale, but dropped Game 2 when Kyle Bradish lasted 2.2IP after serving up 7 earned runs. Starter Tyler Wells pitched in the swing game, taking the 6–2 win and a career-high 7 strikeouts. Cano tied the club record for consecutive retired batters before hitting Justin Turner with a pitch on the elbow.

In advance of traveling to Detroit for their second series against the Tigers, the Orioles promoted infield prospect Joey Ortiz to play matchups against Detroit's three left-handed starters: Joey Wentz, Eduardo Rodriguez and Matthew Boyd. The Orioles scored five times in the seventh inning, capped by Anthony Santander's two-run homer off Chasen Shreve, in a 7–4 comeback victory in Game 1. Ortiz joined Don Baylor as the only Orioles to record at least three RBIs in their debuts. Game 2 was postponed for a doubleheader the following day, which the Orioles split with the Tigers, and the Orioles captured Game 4 and their six consecutive series win. Yennier Cano continued his bullpen dominance and notched his second save; opposing batters were 0-for-32 with a hit by pitch against him in April.

The Orioles ended April 19–9 with the third best record in the Majors, good for second place in the AL East behind the 23–6 Rays, who began the season tied for the Major League record of 13 consecutive wins to start the season. Apart from the Rays, the Orioles only trailed the National League leading 20–9 Pittsburgh Pirates, who lost 100 games in 2022 season. The Orioles 18 wins in April was a franchise record for the month. The Orioles were also 9–0 in series openers. Closer Felix Bautista was awarded AL Reliever of the Month, the second time an Oriole had won the award (Jim Johnson, May 2012) since its inception in 2003. On the farm, the AAA Norfolk Tides also concluded April with the best record in the International League at 18–7, and the largest run differential at plus-87. Norfolk set a franchise record with 24 hits during their April 29 tilt against Charlotte, winning 20–1.

=== May ===
The Orioles entered May with five of their upcoming nine series against teams in the top ten in total wins: Atlanta (18–9), Tampa Bay (23–6), Pittsburgh (20–9), Toronto (18–10), and Texas (17–11).

The month would kick off, however, with a three-game series against the lowly Royals, who had lost 13 of their last 16 games. The Orioles took the opener in a high-scoring 11–7 affair, but were blanked in the second game behind a shaky Kyle Gibson facing Zack Greinke. The Orioles ultimately took the series in Game 3 against former Oriole Jordan Lyles, but not before imploding their 8–1 lead and handing the Royals eight runs. During the series, the Orioles acquired catcher Luis Torrens from the Cubs while taxi squad catcher Maverick Handley nursed a hand contusion. Reliever Joey Krehbiel was outrighted to Norfolk to make room on the roster. Torrens did not ultimately appear in a game for the Orioles before he was designated for assignment on May 9. He rejected his outright assignment and elected free agency.

For the next series, the Orioles traveled to Atlanta to face 2022 Cy Young Award runner-up Max Fried, 2022 Rookie of the Year runner-up Spencer Strider, and then-current NL ERA leader Bryce Elder (1.94). The Orioles took Game 1 against Fried, who had to that point turned in three-straight scoreless starts. Anthony Santander hit his first career grand slam in the seventh inning off reliever Joe Jiménez en route to a 9–4 statement win. Dean Kremer held the hot Atlanta offense to one run. However, in close games the Orioles dropped Games 2 and 3—Strider struck out 10 Orioles in five innings and the Braves rallied for a 5–4 win on Kevin Pillar's two-run homer off Coulombe in the eighth inning. Game 3's loss ended the Orioles' series win streak at seven; Michael Harris II doubled off Cionel Pérez in the 12th inning to score automatic runner Ozzie Albies and give the Braves a 3–2 victory.

Against division rival Tampa Bay Rays, owners of the best record in baseball, the Orioles dropped their first series opener of the season when they were blanked 3–0 by Baltimore native Shane McClanahan. Gibson provided a quality start in the losing effort. Ramon Urias was removed late from the game due to a hamstring strain running the bases; he was added to the 10-day injured list shortly thereafter. The Orioles called up prospect Drew Rom though he did not make his debut before being optioned again following the series. Grayson Rodriguez followed his May 4 implosion against the Royals with a solid 2ER win against the formidable Tampa Bay offense, and the Orioles would take the series behind an excellent Dean Kremer, who allowed no runs through six innings. The Orioles would hand Tampa Bay just their third series loss.

The Orioles would meet the Pirates at Camden Yards for a three-game weekend series, though the previously hot Pittsburgh team arrived having lost nine of their last ten games. Friday night's game included the introduction of the Bird Bath Splash Zone, a section of left field lower box seats designated for being drenched with water when the Orioles get an extra-base hit. The section sold out its inaugural weekend. The Orioles poured on the offense in the 8th inning of Game 1, with Cedric Mullins completing the club's seventh cycle in history, and securing a 6–3 win. The Orioles shutout the Bucs 2–0 in Game 2 behind Tyler Wells, who owned the lowest WHIP in the Majors entering the game (0.775). However, the Pirates would stave off the sweep by starting Mitch Keller, who returned the shutout in Game 3 by striking out a career high 13 Orioles on his way to a 4-0 Pirates win.

Baltimore then welcomed baseball phenom Shohei Ohtani and the Los Angeles Angels to Camden Yards for a four-game series. Ohtani faced off against Grayson Rodriguez in Game 1, and despite his poor pitching line, Ohtani delivered a three-run home run as part of an 11-batter, five-run inning that drove Rodriguez from the game in the 4th. The Orioles returned with wins behind Kremer in Game 2, and Bradish in Game 3. Tyler Wells would enter Game 4 with the lowest WHIP in baseball, a cool 0.723, and coming off a 7IP start where he one-hit the Pirates. However, the Orioles could not take the series with Ohtani and Mike Trout homering off Wells on the way to a 6-5 Orioles loss. The club explored Anthony Santander at first base in two games, a position he had not played at any level since being acquired by the Orioles in 2016.

The 28–16 Orioles then flew to Canada with possession of the second lowest bullpen ERA in the majors at this point (2.99)-- and they'd look to improve against a formidable Blue Jay lineup in Toronto. During Game 1, Gibson pitched a strong one-run game through 7IP, and Yennier Cano surrendered his first earned run after 17 scoreless appearances on the way to a 6–2 win. The Orioles would also get a productive start from Grayson Rodriguez in Game 2, going five innings and surrendering two runs. On a three-run home run, Ryan O'Hearn would tie the game in the 8th and go into extras, with the Orioles moving ahead in the top tenth on a fielders choice and Felix Bautista striking out the side for the win. The Oriole would then sweep the Blue Jays in Game 3 behind Dean Kremer; the Orioles piled 5 runs on Toronto reliever Yimi Garcia in the 11th inning, winning 8–3.

=== Game log ===
Past games legend
Orioles Win (#bfb)	Orioles Loss (#fbb)	Game postponed (#bbb)	Clinched Playoff Berth (#039)	Clinched Division (#090)
Bold denotes an Orioles pitcher

Future Games Legend
Home Game	Away Game

2023 Game Log: 101–61 (Home: 49–32; Road: 52–29)
March/April: 19–9 (Home: 9–4; Road: 10–5)

#	Date	Opponent	Score	Win	Loss	Save	Attendance	Record	Streak/ Box
1	March 30	@ Red Sox	10–9	**Gibson** (1–0)	Kluber (0–1)	**Bautista** (1)	36,049	1–0	W1
2	April 1	@ Red Sox	8–9	Jansen (1–0)	**Bautista** (0–1)	—	29,062	1–1	L1
3	April 2	@ Red Sox	5–9	Houck (1–0)	**Irvin** (0–1)	—	27,886	1–2	L2
4	April 3	@ Rangers	2–0	**Coulombe** (1–0)	Gray (0–1)	**Bautista** (2)	15,867	2–2	W1
5	April 4	@ Rangers	7–2	**Gibson** (2–0)	Heaney (0–1)	—	16,268	3–2	W2
6	April 5	@ Rangers	2–5	deGrom (1–0)	**Voth** (0–1)	Leclerc (1)	18,560	3–3	L1
—	April 6	Postponed (rain). Makeup date April 7.							
7	April 7	Yankees	7–6	**Pérez** (1–0)	Marinaccio (0–1)	**Bautista** (3)	45,017	4–3	W1
8	April 8	Yankees	1–4	Brito (2–0)	**Irvin** (0–2)	Holmes (2)	30,561	4–4	L1
9	April 9	Yankees	3–5	Cortés Jr. (2–0)	**Wells** (0–1)	Holmes (3)	29,221	4–5	L2
10	April 10	Athletics	5–1	**Gibson** (3–0)	Sears (0–1)	—	9,322	5–5	W1
11	April 11	Athletics	12–8	**Baker** (1–0)	Moll (0–1)	—	12,305	6–5	W2
12	April 12	Athletics	4–8	Smith (1–0)	**Akin** (0–1)	—	10,181	6–6	L1
13	April 13	Athletics	8–7	**Bautista** (1–1)	May (2–2)	—	11,665	7–6	W1
14	April 14	@ White Sox	6–3	**Baumann** (1–0)	López (0–1)	**Bautista** (4)	18,941	8–6	W2
15	April 15	@ White Sox	6–7 (10)	Lambert (1–0)	**Gillaspie** (0–1)	—	32,091	8–7	L1
16	April 16	@ White Sox	8–4	**Baumann** (2–0)	Bummer (0–1)	—	13,794	9–7	W1
17	April 18	@ Nationals	1–0	**Kremer** (1–0)	Gray (0–4)	**Bautista** (5)	18,747	10–7	W2
18	April 19	@ Nationals	4–0	**Bradish** (1–0)	Gore (2–1)	—	22,598	11–7	W3
19	April 21	Tigers	2–1	**Bautista** (2–1)	Foley (0–1)	—	18,772	12–7	W4
20	April 22	Tigers	5–1	**Gibson** (4–0)	Wentz (0–3)	—	12,194	13–7	W5
21	April 23	Tigers	2–1 (10)	**Akin** (1–1)	Englert (0–1)	—	36,975	14–7	W6
22	April 24	Red Sox	5–4	**Kremer** (2–0)	Sale (1–2)	**Canó** (1)	11,811	15–7	W7
23	April 25	Red Sox	6–8	Kluber (1–4)	**Bradish** (1–1)	Jansen (6)	14,343	15–8	L1
24	April 26	Red Sox	6–2	**Wells** (1–1)	Houck (3–1)	—	12,044	16–8	W1
25	April 27	@ Tigers	7–4	**Baker** (2–0)	Shreve (1–2)	**Bautista** (6)	11,599	17–8	W2
—	April 28	Postponed (rain). Makeup date April 29 as part of a doubleheader.							
26	April 29	@ Tigers	4–7	Rodríguez (2–2)	**Kremer** (2–1)	Lange (3)	17,974	17–9	L1
27	April 29	@ Tigers	6–4	**Rodriguez** (1–0)	Boyd (1–2)	**Bautista** (7)	11,048	18–9	W1
28	April 30	@ Tigers	5–3	**Voth** (1–1)	Turnbull (1–4)	**Canó** (2)	13,626	19–9	W2

May: 16–12 (Home: 8–8; Road: 8–4)

#	Date	Opponent	Score	Win	Loss	Save	Attendance	Record	Streak/ Box
29	May 2	@ Royals	11–7	**Wells** (2–1)	Yarbrough (0–4)	—	10,487	20–9	W3
30	May 3	@ Royals	0–6	Greinke (1–4)	**Gibson** (4–1)	—	10,362	20–10	L1
31	May 4	@ Royals	13–10	**Canó** (1–0)	Chapman (1–2)	—	11,514	21–10	W1
32	May 5	@ Braves	9–4	**Kremer** (3–1)	Fried (2–1)	—	40,176	22–10	W2
33	May 6	@ Braves	4–5	Minter (2–3)	**Coulombe** (1–1)	Iglesias (1)	41,454	22–11	L1
34	May 7	@ Braves	2–3 (12)	Tonkin (3–1)	**Pérez** (1–1)	—	40,800	22–12	L2
35	May 8	Rays	0–3	McClanahan (7–0)	**Gibson** (4–2)	—	12,669	22–13	L3
36	May 9	Rays	4–2	**Rodriguez** (2–0)	Eflin (4–1)	**Bautista** (8)	10,017	23–13	W1
37	May 10	Rays	2–1	**Kremer** (4–1)	Chirinos (1–1)	**Canó** (3)	14,395	24–13	W2
38	May 12	Pirates	6–3	**Baker** (3–0)	Hernández (0–1)	**Bautista** (9)	25,682	25–13	W3
39	May 13	Pirates	2–0	**Wells** (3–1)	Contreras (3–4)	**Bautista** (10)	21,926	26–13	W4
40	May 14	Pirates	0–4	Keller (5–1)	**Gibson** (4–3)	—	36,403	26–14	L1
41	May 15	Angels	5–9	Ohtani (5–1)	**Rodriguez** (2–1)	—	20,148	26–15	L2
42	May 16	Angels	7–3	**Kremer** (5–1)	Silseth (0–1)	—	13,244	27–15	W1
43	May 17	Angels	3–1	**Bradish** (2–1)	Canning (2–2)	**Bautista** (11)	15,702	28–15	W2
44	May 18	Angels	5–6	Devenski (1–0)	**Baker** (3–1)	Estévez (10)	27,778	28–16	L1
45	May 19	@ Blue Jays	6–2	**Gibson** (5–3)	Kikuchi (5–1)	—	32,485	29–16	W1
46	May 20	@ Blue Jays	6–5 (10)	**Bautista** (3–1)	García (1–1)	—	41,611	30–16	W2
47	May 21	@ Blue Jays	8–3 (11)	**Baumann** (3–0)	García (1–2)	—	41,643	31–16	W3
48	May 23	@ Yankees	5–6 (10)	King (1–1)	**Baker** (3–2)	—	40,652	31–17	L1
49	May 24	@ Yankees	9–6	**Baumann** (4–0)	Cordero (3–2)	**Bautista** (12)	39,455	32–17	W1
50	May 25	@ Yankees	3–1	**Gibson** (6–3)	Schmidt (2–5)	**Canó** (4)	41,520	33–17	W2
51	May 26	Rangers	2–12	Gray (5–1)	**Rodriguez** (2–2)	—	20,293	33–18	L1
52	May 27	Rangers	3–5	Heaney (4–3)	**Kremer** (5–2)	—	37,939	33–19	L2
53	May 28	Rangers	3–2	**Coulombe** (2–1)	Ragans (2–2)	**Bautista** (13)	25,124	34–19	W1
54	May 29	Guardians	0–5	Allen (2–2)	**Wells** (3–2)	—	25,249	34–20	L1
55	May 30	Guardians	8–5	**Gibson** (7–3)	Quantrill (2–4)	**Bautista** (14)	11,709	35–20	W1
56	May 31	Guardians	8–12	Curry (2–0)	**Givens** (0–1)	—	11,304	35–21	L1

June: 13–11 (Home: 8–5; Road: 5–6)

#	Date	Opponent	Score	Win	Loss	Save	Attendance	Record	Streak/ Box
57	June 2	@ Giants	3–2	**Kremer** (6–2)	Webb (4–6)	**Bautista** (15)	27,873	36–21	W1
58	June 3	@ Giants	0–4	Cobb (5–2)	**Bradish** (2–2)	—	32,416	36–22	L1
59	June 4	@ Giants	8–3	**Wells** (4–2)	DeSclafani (4–5)	—	35,571	37–22	W1
60	June 6	@ Brewers	3–4 (10)	Strzelecki (3–4)	**Voth** (1–2)	—	22,535	37–23	L1
61	June 7	@ Brewers	2–10	Burnes (5–4)	**Kremer** (6–3)	—	22,320	37–24	L2
62	June 8	@ Brewers	6–3	**Akin** (2–1)	Strzelecki (3–5)	**Bautista** (16)	27,318	38–24	W1
63	June 9	Royals	3–2	**Wells** (5–2)	Lynch (0–2)	**Bautista** (17)	18,076	39–24	W2
64	June 10	Royals	6–1	**Irvin** (1–2)	Singer (4–5)	—	34,136	40–24	W3
65	June 11	Royals	11–3	**Gibson** (8–3)	Mayers (1–2)	—	23,255	41–24	W4
66	June 13	Blue Jays	11–6	**Kremer** (7–3)	Bassitt (7–5)	—	16,018	42–24	W5
67	June 14	Blue Jays	1–3	Berríos (7–4)	**Bradish** (2–3)	Romano (19)	16,083	42–25	L1
68	June 15	Blue Jays	4–2	**Wells** (6–2)	García (1–3)	**Bautista** (18)	22,555	43–25	W1
69	June 16	@ Cubs	3–10	Hendricks (2–2)	**Irvin** (1–3)	—	37,515	43–26	L1
70	June 17	@ Cubs	2–3	Steele (7–2)	**Gibson** (8–4)	Alzolay (4)	40,605	43–27	L2
71	June 18	@ Cubs	6–3	**Kremer** (8–3)	Taillon (2–5)	**Bautista** (19)	40,121	44–27	W1
72	June 20	@ Rays	8–6	**Bradish** (3–3)	Glasnow (2–1)	**Bautista** (20)	20,906	45–27	W2
73	June 21	@ Rays	2–7	Bradley (5–3)	**Wells** (6–3)	—	19,493	45–28	L1
74	June 23	Mariners	1–13	Gilbert (5–4)	**Gibson** (8–5)	—	16,234	45–29	L2
75	June 24	Mariners	6–4 (10)	**Baumann** (5–0)	Topa (1–3)	—	32,884	46–29	W1
76	June 25	Mariners	3–2	**Bradish** (4–3)	Kirby (6–7)	**Bautista** (21)	19,143	47–29	W2
77	June 26	Reds	10–3	**Zimmermann** (1–0)	Williamson (1–1)	—	13,077	48–29	W3
78	June 27	Reds	1–3	Abbott (4–0)	**Wells** (6–4)	Díaz (22)	14,057	48–30	L1
79	June 28	Reds	7–11 (10)	Díaz (3–1)	**Akin** (2–2)	—	21,152	48–31	L2
80	June 30	Twins	1–8	López (4–5)	**Kremer** (8–4)	—	34,792	48–32	L3

July: 17–9 (Home: 7–4; Road: 10–5)

#	Date	Opponent	Score	Win	Loss	Save	Attendance	Record	Streak/ Box
81	July 1	Twins	0–1	Ober (5–4)	**Bradish** (4–4)	Durán (12)	40,012	48–33	L4
82	July 2	Twins	2–1	**Pérez** (2–1)	Durán (2–3)	**Bautista** (22)	16,299	49–33	W1
83	July 3	@ Yankees	3–6	Kahnle (1–0)	**Canó** (1–1)	Holmes (10)	46,015	49–34	L1
84	July 4	@ Yankees	4–8	Schmidt (4–6)	**Gibson** (8–6)	—	43,876	49–35	L2
85	July 5	@ Yankees	6–3	**Kremer** (9–4)	Ramirez (0–1)	**Bautista** (23)	36,022	50–35	W1
86	July 6	@ Yankees	14–1	**Bradish** (5–4)	Severino (1–4)	—	39,766	51–35	W2
87	July 7	@ Twins	3–1 (10)	**Bautista** (4–1)	Durán (2–4)	—	32,724	52–35	W3
88	July 8	@ Twins	6–2	**Wells** (7–4)	Gray (4–3)	—	27,617	53–35	W4
89	July 9	@ Twins	15–2	**Gibson** (9–6)	Ryan (8–6)	—	27,100	54–35	W5
ASG	July 11	@ T-Mobile Park	NL @ AL	Doval (1–0)	Bautista (0–1)	Kimbrel (1)	47,159	—	N/A
90	July 14	Marlins	5–2	**Kremer** (10–4)	Alcántara (3–8)	**Bautista** (24)	23,377	55–35	W6
91	July 15	Marlins	6–5	**Baumann** (6–0)	Brazobán (3–2)	**Bautista** (25)	28,593	56–35	W7
92	July 16	Marlins	5–4	**Bradish** (6–4)	Okert (3–1)	**Coulombe** (1)	30,761	57–35	W8
93	July 17	Dodgers	4–6	Sheehan (3–0)	**Baker** (3–3)	Brasier (2)	21,956	57–36	L1
94	July 18	Dodgers	3–10	Grove (2–2)	**Wells** (7–5)	—	22,775	57–37	L2
95	July 19	Dodgers	8–5	**Coulombe** (3–1)	Urías (7–6)	**Bautista** (26)	22,248	58–37	W1
96	July 20	@ Rays	4–3 (10)	**Bautista** (5–1)	Stephenson (1–4)	—	20,203	59–37	W2
97	July 21	@ Rays	0–3	Eflin (11–5)	**Bradish** (6–5)	Fairbanks (11)	19,703	59–38	L1
98	July 22	@ Rays	6–5	**Pérez** (3–1)	Fairbanks (0–4)	**Bautista** (27)	25,025	60–38	W1
99	July 23	@ Rays	5–3	**Baumann** (7–0)	Poche (7–3)	**Bautista** (28)	23,440	61–38	W2
100	July 24	@ Phillies	3–2	**Baker** (4–3)	Kimbrel (6–2)	**Pérez** (1)	44,043	62–38	W3
101	July 25	@ Phillies	3–4	Marte (1–1)	**Canó** (1–2)	—	37,200	62–39	L1
102	July 26	@ Phillies	4–6	Domínguez (2–2)	**Bradish** (6–6)	Soto (2)	40,235	62–40	L2
103	July 28	Yankees	1–0	**Bautista** (6–1)	Kahnle (1–1)	—	34,558	63–40	W1
104	July 29	Yankees	3–8	Schmidt (7–6)	**Wells** (7–6)	—	42,829	63–41	L1
105	July 30	Yankees	9–3	**Baumann** (8–0)	Severino (2–5)	—	37,429	64–41	W1
106	July 31	@ Blue Jays	4–2	**Gibson** (10–6)	Bassitt (10–6)	**Bautista** (29)	31,122	65–41	W2

August: 18–9 (Home: 10–5; Road: 8–4)

#	Date	Opponent	Score	Win	Loss	Save	Attendance	Record	Streak/ Box
107	August 1	@ Blue Jays	13–3	**Bradish** (7–6)	Ryu (0–1)	—	40,691	66–41	W3
108	August 2	@ Blue Jays	1–4	Kikuchi (9–3)	**Rodriguez** (2–3)	Swanson (3)	36,924	66–42	L1
109	August 3	@ Blue Jays	6–1	**Flaherty** (8–6)	Gausman (8–6)	—	42,672	67–42	W1
110	August 4	Mets	10–3	**Baumann** (9–0)	Bickford (2–4)	—	29,550	68–42	W2
111	August 5	Mets	7–3	**Gibson** (11–6)	Megill (6–5)	—	44,326	69–42	W3
112	August 6	Mets	2–0	**Pérez** (4–1)	Quintana (0–3)	**Bautista** (30)	27,100	70–42	W4
113	August 8	Astros	6–7	Stanek (3–1)	**Bautista** (6–2)	Pressly (27)	24,761	70–43	L1
114	August 9	Astros	2–8	Javier (8–2)	**Flaherty** (8–7)	—	25,479	70–44	L2
115	August 10	Astros	5–4	**Kremer** (11–4)	Brown (8–8)	**Bautista** (31)	22,981	71–44	W1
116	August 11	@ Mariners	2–9	Castillo (8–7)	**Gibson** (11–7)	—	36,203	71–45	L1
117	August 12	@ Mariners	1–0 (10)	**Bautista** (7–2)	Muñoz (2–5)	—	45,823	72–45	W1
118	August 13	@ Mariners	5–3 (10)	**Vespi** (1–0)	Thornton (0–1)	**Fujinami** (1)	44,818	73–45	W2
119	August 14	@ Padres	4–1	**Rodriguez** (3–3)	Darvish (8–8)	**Bautista** (32)	38,176	74–45	W3
120	August 15	@ Padres	3–10	Wacha (9–2)	**Flaherty** (8–8)	—	35,604	74–46	L1
121	August 16	@ Padres	2–5	Snell (10–8)	**Kremer** (11–5)	Hader (27)	42,318	74–47	L2
122	August 18	@ Athletics	9–4	**Gibson** (12–7)	Pérez (0–1)	—	8,492	75–47	W1
123	August 19	@ Athletics	7–2 (10)	**Bautista** (8–2)	Martínez (0–1)	—	18,213	76–47	W2
124	August 20	@ Athletics	12–1	**Bradish** (8–6)	Sears (2–10)	—	16,198	77–47	W3
125	August 22	Blue Jays	3–6 (10)	Mayza (3–1)	**Baumann** (9–1)	Romano (31)	20,612	77–48	L1
126	August 23	Blue Jays	7–0	**Kremer** (12–5)	Gausman (9–8)	—	19,132	78–48	W1
127	August 24	Blue Jays	5–3	**Gibson** (13–7)	Berríos (9–9)	**Bautista** (33)	19,432	79–48	W2
128	August 25	Rockies	5–4	**Fujinami** (6–8)	Suter (4–3)	**Coulombe** (2)	28,872	80–48	W3
129	August 26	Rockies	5–4	**Bradish** (9–6)	Flexen (1–6)	**Canó** (5)	42,535	81–48	W4
130	August 27	Rockies	3–4	Lawrence (4–6)	**Canó** (1–3)	—	30,773	81–49	L1
131	August 28	White Sox	9–0	**Rodriguez** (4–3)	Kopech (5–12)	—	12,325	82–49	W1
132	August 29	White Sox	9–3	**Coulombe** (4–1)	Bummer (4–3)	—	14,903	83–49	W2
133	August 30	White Sox	5–10	Cease (6–7)	**Gibson** (13–8)	—	17,723	83–50	L1

September/October: 18–11 (Home: 7–6; Road: 11–5)

#	Date	Opponent	Score	Win	Loss	Save	Attendance	Record	Streak/ Box
134	September 1	@ Diamondbacks	2–4	Davies (2–5)	**Irvin** (1–4)	Sewald (29)	18,248	83–51	L2
135	September 2	@ Diamondbacks	7–3	**Bradish** (10–6)	Cecconi (0–1)	—	34,118	84–51	W1
136	September 3	@ Diamondbacks	8–5	**Coulombe** (5–1)	Gallen (14–7)	—	24,284	85–51	W2
137	September 4	@ Angels	6–3	**Rodriguez** (5–3)	Rosenberg (0–1)	**Canó** (6)	29,214	86–51	W3
138	September 5	@ Angels	5–4 (10)	**Krehbiel** (1–0)	Soriano (0–2)	**Fujinami** (2)	22,496	87–51	W4
139	September 6	@ Angels	10–3	**Gibson** (14–8)	Sandoval (7–12)	—	29,021	88–51	W5
140	September 8	@ Red Sox	11–2	**Bradish** (11–6)	Houck (4–9)	—	33,852	89–51	W6
141	September 9	@ Red Sox	13–12	**Fujinami** (7–8)	Sale (6–4)	—	34,615	90–51	W7
142	September 10	@ Red Sox	3–7	Bello (12–8)	**Rodriguez** (5–4)	—	31,295	90–52	L1
143	September 11	Cardinals	11–5	**Hall** (1–0)	Hudson (6–2)	—	15,485	91–52	W1
144	September 12	Cardinals	2–5	Wainwright (4–11)	**Means** (0–1)	Helsley (9)	15,526	91–53	L1
145	September 13	Cardinals	0–1	Rom (1–2)	**Gibson** (14–9)	Helsley (10)	14,442	91–54	L2
146	September 14	Rays	3–4	Poche (12–3)	**Bradish** (11–7)	Fairbanks (24)	24,835	91–55	L3
147	September 15	Rays	1–7	Eflin (15–8)	**Flaherty** (8–9)	—	43,359	91–56	L4
148	September 16	Rays	8–0	**Rodriguez** (6–4)	Glasnow (9–6)	—	38,432	92–56	W1
149	September 17	Rays	5–4 (11)	**Hall** (2–0)	Diekman (0–2)	—	37,297	93–56	W2
150	September 18	@ Astros	8–7	**Baumann** (10–1)	Pressly (3–5)	**Canó** (7)	34,456	94–56	W3
151	September 19	@ Astros	9–5	**Hall** (3–0)	Brown (11–12)	**Pérez** (2)	35,050	95–56	W4
152	September 20	@ Astros	1–2	Pressly (4–5)	**Coulombe** (5–2)	—	36,427	95–57	L1
153	September 21	@ Guardians	2–5	Stephan (7–7)	**Pérez** (4–2)	Clase (42)	25,226	95–58	L2
154	September 22	@ Guardians	8–9	Clase (3–9)	**Canó** (1–4)	—	22,567	95–59	L3
155	September 23	@ Guardians	2–1	**Means** (1–1)	Quantrill (3–7)	**Pérez** (3)	28,271	96–59	W1
156	September 24	@ Guardians	5–1	**Gibson** (15–9)	McKenzie (0–2)	—	20,287	97–59	W2
157	September 26	Nationals	1–0	**Bradish** (12–7)	Gray (8–13)	**Canó** (8)	20,823	98–59	W3
158	September 27	Nationals	5–1	**Rodriguez** (7–4)	Corbin (10–15)	—	24,278	99–59	W4
159	September 28	Red Sox	2–0	**Kremer** (13–5)	Sale (6–5)	**Wells** (1)	27,543	100–59	W5
160	September 29	Red Sox	0–3	Pivetta (10–9)	**Means** (1–2)	Whitlock (1)	28,192	100–60	L1
161	September 30	Red Sox	5–2	**Zimmermann** (2–0)	Winckowski (4–4)	—	43,150	101–60	W1
162	October 1	Red Sox	1–6	Houck (6–10)	**Coulombe** (5–3)	—	36,640	101–61	L1

== Post-season ==
The Orioles made the post-season for the first time since 2016 and won the AL East for the first time since 2014. They received a bye in the Wild Card Series by virtue of finishing in the top-2 of the American League.

=== Division Series ===
The Orioles faced the Texas Rangers in the American League Division Series. This was the second postseason meeting between the Orioles and Rangers, following their 2012 American League Wild Card Game match-up, which the Orioles won 5–1. The Orioles had an extremely disappointing ALDS against the Texas Rangers, as they were upset in a sweep with losses of 3–2, 11–8, and 7–1. The Rangers would go on to defeat the Houston Astros in the ALCS 4–3 in seven games, and would win the World Series 4–1 over the Arizona Diamondbacks in five games.

=== Post-season game log ===
Baltimore Orioles 2023 Post-season Game Log
American League Division Series vs. Rangers (0–3)

#	Date	Opponent	Score	Win	Loss	Save	Attendance	Series	Box
1	October 7	Rangers	2–3	Dunning (1–0)	Bradish (0–1)	Leclerc (1)	46,450	0–1	L1
2	October 8	Rangers	8–11	Bradford (1–0)	Rodriguez (0–1)	—	46,475	0–2	L2
3	October 10	@ Rangers	1–7	Eovaldi (2–0)	Kremer (0–1)	—	40,861	0–3	L3

=== Postseason rosters ===
Playoff rosters
American League Division Series

- Pitchers: 15 Jack Flaherty 24 DL Hall 30 Grayson Rodriguez 39 Kyle Bradish 43 Bryan Baker 48 Kyle Gibson 54 Danny Coulombe 58 Cionel Pérez 64 Dean Kremer 66 Jacob Webb 68 Tyler Wells 78 Yennier Canó
- Catchers: 27 James McCann 35 Adley Rutschman
- Infielders: 2 Gunnar Henderson 3 Jorge Mateo 6 Ryan Mountcastle 11 Jordan Westburg 12 Adam Frazier 29 Ramón Urías 32 Ryan O'Hearn
- Outfielders: 13 Heston Kjerstad 21 Austin Hays 25 Anthony Santander 31 Cedric Mullins 34 Aaron Hicks

== Regular season standings ==
=== American League East ===
AL East
Team	W	L	Pct.	GB	Home	Road
Baltimore Orioles	101	61	.623	—	49‍–‍32	52‍–‍29
Tampa Bay Rays	99	63	.611	2	53‍–‍28	46‍–‍35
Toronto Blue Jays	89	73	.549	12	43‍–‍38	46‍–‍35
New York Yankees	82	80	.506	19	42‍–‍39	40‍–‍41
Boston Red Sox	78	84	.481	23	39‍–‍42	39‍–‍42

=== American League Division Winners ===
Division leaders
Team	W	L	Pct.
Baltimore Orioles	101	61	.623
Houston Astros	90	72	.556
Minnesota Twins	87	75	.537

Wild Card teams (Top 3 teams qualify for postseason)
Team	W	L	Pct.	GB
Tampa Bay Rays	99	63	.611	+10
Texas Rangers	90	72	.556	+1
Toronto Blue Jays	89	73	.549	—
Seattle Mariners	88	74	.543	1
New York Yankees	82	80	.506	7
Boston Red Sox	78	84	.481	11
Detroit Tigers	78	84	.481	11
Cleveland Guardians	76	86	.469	13
Los Angeles Angels	73	89	.451	16
Chicago White Sox	61	101	.377	28
Kansas City Royals	56	106	.346	33
Oakland Athletics	50	112	.309	39

=== Record vs. opponents ===
==== Record vs. American League ====
2023 American League record Source: MLB Standings Grid – 2023
Team	BAL	BOS	CWS	CLE	DET	HOU	KC	LAA	MIN	NYY	OAK	SEA	TB	TEX	TOR	NL
Baltimore	—	7–6	4–2	3–4	6–1	3–3	5–1	5–2	4–2	7–6	6–1	4–2	8–5	3–3	10–3	26–20
Boston	6–7	—	2–4	3–3	5–1	2–5	5–2	3–4	4–3	9–4	4–2	3–3	2–11	3–3	7–6	20–26
Chicago	2–4	4–2	—	8–5	5–8	3–4	6–7	3–4	4–9	4–2	3–4	2–4	1–6	1–5	0–6	15–31
Cleveland	4–3	3–3	5–8	—	4–9	2–4	7–6	3–4	7–6	2–4	5–1	4–3	3–3	3–3	4–3	20–26
Detroit	1–6	1–5	8–5	9–4	—	3–3	10–3	3–3	8–5	2–5	3–4	3–3	1–5	3–4	2–4	21–25
Houston	3–3	5–2	4–3	4–2	3–3	—	1–5	9–4	2–4	2–5	10–3	4–9	3–3	9–4	3–4	28–18
Kansas City	1–5	2–5	7–6	6–7	3–10	5–1	—	2–4	4–9	2–4	2–4	1–6	3–4	1–5	1–6	16–30
Los Angeles	2–5	4–3	4–3	4–3	3–3	4–9	4–2	—	3–3	4–2	7–6	5–8	2–4	6–7	2–4	19–27
Minnesota	2–4	3–4	9–4	6–7	5–8	4–2	9–4	3–3	—	4–3	5–1	3–4	1–5	5–2	3–3	25–21
New York	6–7	4–9	2–4	4–2	5–2	5–2	4–2	2–4	3–4	—	5–1	4–2	5–8	3–4	7–6	23–23
Oakland	1–6	2–4	4–3	1–5	4–3	3–10	4–2	6–7	1–5	1–5	—	1–12	2–5	4–9	2–4	14–32
Seattle	2–4	3–3	4–2	3–4	3–3	9–4	6–1	8–5	4–3	2–4	12–1	—	3–4	4–9	3–3	22–24
Tampa Bay	5–8	11–2	6–1	3–3	5–1	3–3	4–3	4–2	5–1	8–5	5–2	4–3	—	2–4	7–6	27–19
Texas	3–3	3–3	5–1	3–3	4–3	4–9	5–1	7–6	2–5	4–3	9–4	9–4	4–2	—	6–1	22–24
Toronto	3–10	6–7	6–0	3–4	4–2	4–3	6–1	4–2	3–3	6–7	4–2	3–3	6–7	1–6	—	30–16

Updated with the results of all games through October 1, 2023.

==== Record vs. National League ====
2023 American League record vs. National League Source: MLB Standings
Team	ARI	ATL	CHC	CIN	COL	LAD	MIA	MIL	NYM	PHI	PIT	SD	SF	STL	WSH
Baltimore	2–1	1–2	1–2	1–2	2–1	1–2	3–0	1–2	3–0	1–2	2–1	1–2	2–1	1–2	4–0
Boston	2–1	3–1	2–1	1–2	1–2	1–2	0–3	2–1	2–1	2–1	0–3	2–1	1–2	0–3	1–2
Chicago	1–2	2–1	1–3	2–1	1–2	1–2	1–2	0–3	1–2	1–2	1–2	0–3	1–2	1–2	1–2
Cleveland	1–2	1–2	2–1	2–2	1–2	1–2	1–2	1–2	0–3	2–1	2–1	1–2	1–2	2–1	2–1
Detroit	0–3	1–2	1–2	1–2	2–1	1–2	1–2	2–1	3–0	0–3	2–2	1–2	3–0	2–1	1–2
Houston	3–0	3–0	3–0	0–3	3–1	1–2	2–1	1–2	2–1	1–2	2–1	2–1	1–2	2–1	2–1
Kansas City	1–2	0–3	1–2	0–3	1–2	2–1	0–3	0–3	3–0	1–2	0–3	2–1	2–1	2–2	1–2
Los Angeles	1–2	1–2	3–0	0–3	1–2	0–4	0–3	1–2	2–1	1–2	2–1	0–3	2–1	3–0	2–1
Minnesota	3–0	0–3	2–1	2–1	2–1	1–2	1–2	2–2	2–1	2–1	2–1	2–1	1–2	2–1	1–2
New York	2–1	0–3	1–2	3–0	1–2	2–1	1–2	1–2	2–2	2–1	2–1	2–1	2–1	1–2	1–2
Oakland	1–2	2–1	0–3	1–2	2–1	0–3	0–3	3–0	0–3	0–3	2–1	0–3	2–2	1–2	0–3
Seattle	2–1	1–2	1–2	1–2	3–0	0–3	2–1	0–3	1–2	1–2	2–1	3–1	2–1	2–1	1–2
Tampa Bay	2–1	1–2	1–2	2–1	3–0	2–1	3–1	2–1	1–2	0–3	3–0	1–2	2–1	1–2	3–0
Texas	1–3	1–2	1–2	0–3	3–0	1–2	3–0	0–3	2–1	3–0	2–1	0–3	2–1	2–1	1–2
Toronto	3–0	3–0	1–2	2–1	2–1	2–1	2–1	2–1	3–0	1–3	3–0	1–2	2–1	1–2	2–1

Updated with the results of all games through October 1, 2023.

== Roster ==
2023 Baltimore Orioles
Roster
Pitchers: 45 Keegan Akin; 43 Bryan Baker; 53 Mike Baumann; 74 Félix Bautista; 67 Eduard Bazardo; 39 Kyle Bradish; 78 Yennier Canó; 54 Danny Coulombe; 15 Jack Flaherty; 14 Shintaro Fujinami; 66 Reed Garrett; 48 Kyle Gibson; 71 Logan Gillaspie; 60 Mychal Givens; 24 DL Hall; 19 Cole Irvin; 52 Joey Krehbiel; 64 Dean Kremer; 73 Jorge López; 47 John Means; 58 Cionel Pérez; 30 Grayson Rodriguez; 75 Chris Vallimont; 79 Nick Vespi; 51 Austin Voth; 66 Jacob Webb; 68 Tyler Wells; 50 Bruce Zimmermann	Catchers: 37 Anthony Bemboom; 56 Mark Kolozsvary; 27 James McCann; 35 Adley Rutschman; Infielders: 12 Adam Frazier; 2 Gunnar Henderson; 49 Josh Lester; 3 Jorge Mateo; 6 Ryan Mountcastle; 32 Ryan O'Hearn; 65 Joey Ortiz; 29 Ramón Urías; 11 Jordan Westburg	Outfielders: 17 Colton Cowser; 21 Austin Hays; 34 Aaron Hicks; 13 Heston Kjerstad; 26 Ryan McKenna; 31 Cedric Mullins; 25 Anthony Santander; 28 Kyle Stowers; 23 Terrin Vavra	Manager: 18 Brandon Hyde; Coaches: 61 Cody Asche (offensive strategy); 62 Matt Borgschulte (co-hitting); 88 Ben Carhart (bullpen catcher); 70 Tim Cossins (field coordinator); 72 Ryan Fuller (co-hitting); 57 Fredi González (bench); 59 José Hernández (coach); 40 Darren Holmes (assistant pitching); 38 Chris Holt (pitching); 89 Ryan Klimek (pitching strategy); 36 Tony Mansolino (third base); 93 Joel Polanco (bullpen catcher); 9 Anthony Sanders (first base)

== Player statistics ==
= Indicates team leader

= Indicates league leader

=== Batting ===
Note: G = Games played; AB = At bats; R = Runs; H = Hits; 2B = Doubles; 3B = Triples; HR = Home runs; RBI = Runs batted in; SB = Stolen bases; BB = Walks; AVG = Batting average; SLG = Slugging average

Player	G	AB	R	H	2B	3B	HR	RBI	SB	BB	AVG	SLG
Anthony Santander	153	591	81	152	41	1	28	95	5	55	.257	.472
Adley Rutschman	154	588	84	163	31	1	20	80	1	92	.277	.435
Gunnar Henderson	150	560	100	143	29	9	28	82	10	56	.255	.489
Austin Hays	144	520	76	143	36	2	16	67	5	38	.275	444
Ryan Mountcastle	115	423	64	114	21	1	18	68	3	37	.270	.452
Adam Frazier	141	412	59	99	21	2	13	60	11	32	.240	.396
Cedric Mullins	116	404	51	94	23	3	15	74	19	43	.233	.416
Ramón Urías	116	360	45	95	22	3	4	42	3	27	.264	.375
Ryan O'Hearn	112	346	48	100	22	1	14	60	5	15	.289	.480
Jorge Mateo	116	318	58	69	14	2	7	34	32	22	.217	.340
Jordan Westburg	68	208	26	54	17	2	3	23	4	16	.260	.404
James McCann	69	207	25	46	14	0	6	26	3	9	.222	.377
Aaron Hicks	65	200	35	55	7	1	7	31	6	35	.275	.425
Ryan McKenna	88	122	23	31	7	0	2	18	5	9	.254	.361
Colton Cowser	26	61	15	7	2	0	0	4	1	13	.115	.148
Terrin Vavra	27	49	9	12	0	0	0	5	1	5	.245	.245
Joey Ortiz	15	33	4	7	1	0	0	4	0	0	.212	.242
Kyle Stowers	14	30	1	2	0	0	0	0	0	3	.067	.067
Heston Kjerstad	13	30	3	7	1	0	2	3	0	2	.233	.467
Josh Lester	11	22	0	4	0	0	0	4	0	1	.182	.182
Anthony Bemboom	6	11	0	2	0	0	0	0	0	2	.182	.182
Mark Kolozsvary	1	0	0	0	0	0	0	0	0	0	.---	.---
Totals	162	5495	807	1399	309	28	183	780	114	512	.255	.421
Rank in AL	—	9	4	6	3	4	9	4	6	9	6	7

Source:Baseball Reference

=== Pitching ===
Note: W = Wins; L = Losses; ERA = Earned run average; G = Games pitched; GS = Games started; SV = Saves; IP = Innings pitched; H = Hits allowed; R = Runs allowed; ER = Earned runs allowed; BB = Walks allowed; SO = Strikeouts

Player	W	L	ERA	G	GS	SV	IP	H	R	ER	BB	SO
Kyle Gibson	15	9	4.73	33	33	0	192.0	198	101	101	55	157
Dean Kremer	13	5	4.12	32	32	0	172.2	171	85	79	55	157
Kyle Bradish	12	7	2.83	30	30	0	168.2	132	54	53	44	168
Grayson Rodriguez	7	4	4.35	23	23	0	122.0	121	62	59	42	129
Tyler Wells	7	6	3.64	25	20	1	118.2	83	50	48	34	117
Cole Irvin	1	4	4.42	24	12	0	77.1	78	42	38	21	68
Yennier Canó	1	4	2.11	72	0	8	72.2	60	19	17	13	65
Mike Baumann	10	1	3.76	60	0	0	64.2	52	29	27	33	61
Félix Bautista	8	2	1.48	56	0	33	61.0	30	14	10	26	110
Cionel Pérez	4	2	3.54	65	0	3	53.1	56	30	21	27	44
Danny Coulombe	5	3	2.81	61	0	2	51.1	45	17	16	12	58
Bryan Baker	4	3	3.60	46	0	0	45.0	33	19	18	24	51
Jack Flaherty	1	3	6.75	9	7	0	34.2	46	27	26	12	42
Austin Voth	1	2	5.19	25	0	0	34.2	39	22	20	15	34
Shintaro Fujinami	2	0	4.85	30	0	2	29.2	21	17	16	15	32
John Means	1	2	2.66	4	4	0	23.2	13	7	7	4	10
Keegan Akin	2	2	6.85	24	1	0	23.2	35	22	18	7	27
Jacob Webb	0	0	3.27	25	0	0	22.0	16	8	8	10	23
DL Hall	3	0	3.26	18	0	0	19.1	18	8	7	5	23
Nick Vespi	1	0	4.30	9	0	0	14.2	16	7	7	2	9
Bruce Zimmermann	2	0	4.73	7	0	0	13.1	17	8	7	0	14
Jorge López	0	0	5.25	12	0	0	12.0	13	7	7	2	14
Logan Gillaspie	0	1	6.00	11	0	0	9.0	14	7	6	5	8
Joey Krehbiel	1	0	1.80	6	0	0	5.0	2	1	1	2	5
Mychal Givens	0	1	11.25	6	0	0	4.0	4	6	5	6	2
Reed Garrett	0	0	10.13	2	0	0	2.2	7	3	3	1	0
Eduard Bazardo	0	0	15.43	3	0	0	2.1	6	4	4	0	1
Ryan McKenna	0	0	18.00	1	0	0	1.0	4	2	2	0	0
Josh Lester	0	0	0.00	1	0	0	1.0	1	0	0	1	1
James McCann	0	0	0.00	1	0	0	1.0	2	0	0	0	0
Chris Vallimont	0	0	0.00	1	0	0	0.2	1	0	0	0	1
Totals	101	61	3.89	162	162	49	1453.2	1334	678	629	473	1431
Rank in AL	1	15	5	—	—	2	1	9	5	5	4	9

Source:Baseball Reference

== Farm system ==
Level	Team	League	Manager
Triple-A	Norfolk Tides	International League	Buck Britton
Double-A	Bowie Baysox	Eastern League	Kyle Moore
High-A	Aberdeen IronBirds	South Atlantic League	Robert Mercado
Low-A	Delmarva Shorebirds	Carolina League	Felipe Rojas Alou Jr.
Rookie	FCL Orioles	Florida Complex League	Alan Mills
Foreign Rookie	DSL Orioles 1	Dominican Summer League	Elvis Morel
Foreign Rookie	DSL Orioles 2	Dominican Summer League	Chris Madera
