= Chris Vallimont =

American baseball player (born 1997)

Minnesota Twins
- Pitcher
- Born: March 18, 1997 (age 29); Erie, Pennsylvania, U.S.
- Bats: Right Throws: Right

MLB debut
- July 3, 2023, for the Baltimore Orioles

MLB statistics (through 2023 season)
- Win–loss record: 0–0
- Earned run average: 0.00
- Strikeouts: 1
- Stats at Baseball Reference

Teams
- Baltimore Orioles (2023)

Chris Ryan Vallimont (born March 18, 1997) is an American professional baseball pitcher in the Minnesota Twins organization. He has previously played in Major League Baseball (MLB) for the Baltimore Orioles.

== Career ==
=== Amateur ===
Vallimont attended Mercyhurst Preparatory School in Erie, Pennsylvania. He attended Mercyhurst University, where he played college baseball for the Lakers. In 2017, he briefly played collegiate summer baseball with the Harwich Mariners of the Cape Cod Baseball League.

=== Miami Marlins ===
Vallimont was drafted by the Miami Marlins in the 5th round, with the 147th overall selection, of the 2018 Major League Baseball draft, and signed with the Marlins.

Vallimont made his professional debut in 2018 with the Batavia Muckdogs, going 0–2 with a 6.21 ERA in 29 innings. He opened the 2019 season with the Clinton LumberKings, going 4–4 with a 2.99 ERA in 69 innings. Vallimont was named to the Midwest League All-Star team. He was promoted to the Jupiter Hammerheads on June 22.

=== Minnesota Twins ===
On July 27, 2019, Vallimont was traded, along with Sergio Romo and a PTBNL, to the Minnesota Twins in exchange for Lewin Díaz. He was assigned to the Fort Myers Miracle following the trade, and ended the season there. Over 23 starts between Clinton, Jupiter, and Fort Myers, Vallimont pitched to an 8–9 record with a 3.24 ERA, striking out 150 over 127 2/3 innings. Vallimont did not play in a game in 2020 due to the cancellation of the minor league season because of the COVID-19 pandemic. In 2021, Vallimont split the year between Fort Myers and the Double-A Wichita Wind Surge, posting a 5–7 record and 5.84 ERA with 136 strikeouts in 94.0 innings of work across 22 starts. He was selected to the 40-man roster following the season on November 19, 2021. He was designated for assignment on May 22, 2022.

=== Baltimore Orioles ===
On May 28, 2022, Vallimont was claimed off waivers by the Baltimore Orioles. Vallimont allowed one run in 13.0 innings pitched across 3 starts for the Double-A Bowie Baysox before he was promoted to the Triple-A Norfolk Tides. In 16 games at Norfolk (12 starts), he recorded a 6–7 record and 5.38 ERA with 67 strikeouts in 72 innings of work.

Vallimont was designated for assignment on January 3, 2023, following the Orioles' acquisition of Ryan O'Hearn. On January 10, Vallimont cleared waivers and was sent outright to Triple-A Norfolk. In 14 games (8 starts), he logged a 5.02 ERA with 64 strikeouts and 2 saves in 57 1/3 innings pitched. On July 1, Vallimont was selected to the 40-man roster and promoted to the major leagues for the first time. He made his MLB debut two days later against the New York Yankees, and tossed a scoreless 0 2/3 of an inning with a strikeout. On July 5, Vallimont was designated for assignment following the promotion of Eduard Bazardo.

=== Cleveland Guardians ===
On July 6, 2023, Vallimont was traded to the Cleveland Guardians in exchange for cash considerations. In 7 games for the Triple–A Columbus Clippers, he struggled to a 7.84 ERA with 4 strikeouts in 10 1/3 innings of work. On August 7, Vallimont was designated for assignment following the waiver claim of Ramón Laureano. He cleared waivers and was sent outright to Columbus on August 9. Vallimont elected free agency on October 11.

=== York Revolution ===
On April 16, 2024, Vallimont signed with the York Revolution of the Atlantic League of Professional Baseball. He made five starts for York, posting a 3–1 record and 3.29 ERA with 33 strikeouts over 27 1/3 innings pitched.

=== Los Angeles Dodgers ===
On May 28, 2024, Vallimont signed a minor league contract with the Los Angeles Dodgers. He pitched in 10 games (nine of them starts) for the Triple-A Oklahoma City Baseball Club with a 1–5 record, 8.57 ERA, and 33 strikeouts. Vallimont was released by the Dodgers organization on July 26.

=== York Revolution (second stint) ===
On August 11, 2024, Vallimont signed with the York Revolution of the Atlantic League of Professional Baseball. With York, Vallimont won the Atlantic League championship. In total between his two stints with York on the year, Vallimont pitched in 13 games (7 starts) and compiled a 6-2 record with a 2.13 ERA and 68 strikeouts over 55 innings of work. Vallimont became a free agent following the season.

=== Bravos de León ===
On March 19, 2025, Vallimont signed with the Bravos de León of the Mexican League. In five starts for León, he struggled to an 0-2 record and 10.43 ERA with 10 strikeouts across 14 2/3 innings pitched. Vallimont was released by the Bravos on May 13.

=== York Revolution (third stint) ===
On June 12, 2025, Vallimont signed with the York Revolution of the Atlantic League of Professional Baseball. On July 15, Vallimont tied York's single-game strikeout record, punching out 13 battings over seven innings pitched against the High Point Rockers. In 18 appearances (16 starts) for the Revolution, he logged a 9-4 record and 4.96 ERA with 119 strikeouts over 98 innings of work. With York, Vallimont won the Atlantic League championship.

On March 24, 2026, Vallimont re-signed with the Revolution. In seven starts for York, he registered a 3–0 record and 3.99 ERA with 51 strikeouts across 38 1/3 innings pitched.

=== Minnesota Twins (second stint) ===
On June 13, 2026, Vallimont's contract was purchased by the Minnesota Twins organization. In 18 games (15 starts) with Double-A Wichita Wind Surge he threw 70.2 innings going 2-4 with a 4.33 ERA and 68 strikeouts.

On October 13, 2026, Vallimont re-signed with the Twins on a new minor league contract for the 2027 season.
