= Ryan McKenna (baseball) =

American baseball player (born 1997)

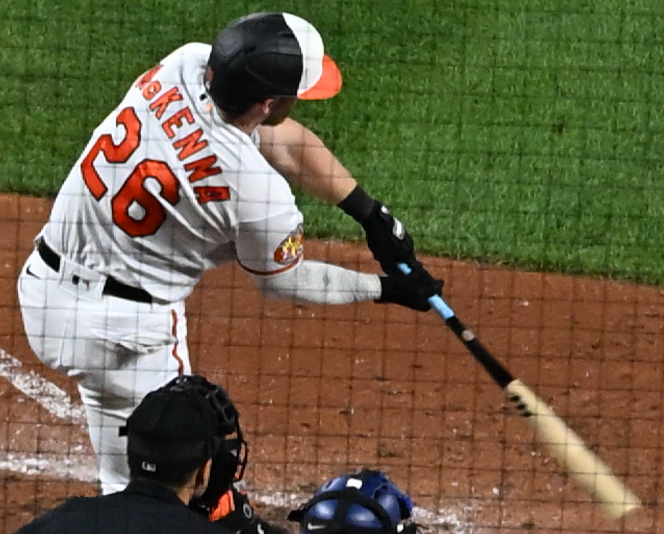
- McKenna with the Baltimore Orioles in 2023
- Outfielder
- Born: February 14, 1997 (age 29); Grants Pass, Oregon, U.S.
- Batted: Right Threw: Right

MLB debut
- April 5, 2021, for the Baltimore Orioles

Last MLB appearance
- May 26, 2024, for the San Francisco Giants

MLB statistics
- Batting average: .221
- Home runs: 8
- Runs batted in: 45
- Stats at Baseball Reference

Teams
- Baltimore Orioles (2021–2024); San Francisco Giants (2024)

Ryan Shea McKenna (born February 14, 1997) is an American former professional baseball outfielder. He played in Major League Baseball (MLB) for the Baltimore Orioles and San Francisco Giants from 2021 to 2024. Listed at 5 feet 11 inches (1.80 m) and 195 pounds (88 kg), he bats and throws right-handed.

== Early life ==
McKenna was born on February 14, 1997, in Grants Pass, Oregon, to parents Marty and Marlene. His family moved to Berwick, Maine when he was young. His father coached him from tee-ball through his freshman year. While in the seventh grade, McKenna joined his older brother on their high school's varsity baseball team.

== Amateur career ==
McKenna attended Portsmouth Christian Academy (PCA) in Dover, New Hampshire, as a freshman before transferring to St. Thomas Aquinas High School. Within his second week at St. Thomas, his coach received phone calls from colleges inquiring about his post-secondary aspirations. In his sophomore season, McKenna committed to attend Liberty University on a 40 percent college baseball scholarship after attending one of their summer training camps. He later stated that the majority of that decision rested on their Judeo-Christian values. He then gained national attention after batting .308 with five stolen bases in the Area Code Games and performing well during the East Coast Pro Showcase. During his junior year with the St. Thomas Saints, McKenna, batted .551 and drove in 31 runs. In his senior year, McKenna hit .452 with five extra-base hits despite missing five of his team's 16-regular-season games due to a strained hamstring. He returned to help the St. Thomas Saints in the Division II tournament before they were upset by 11th-seeded John Stark of Weare in the tournament's preliminary round.

== Professional career ==
=== Baltimore Orioles ===
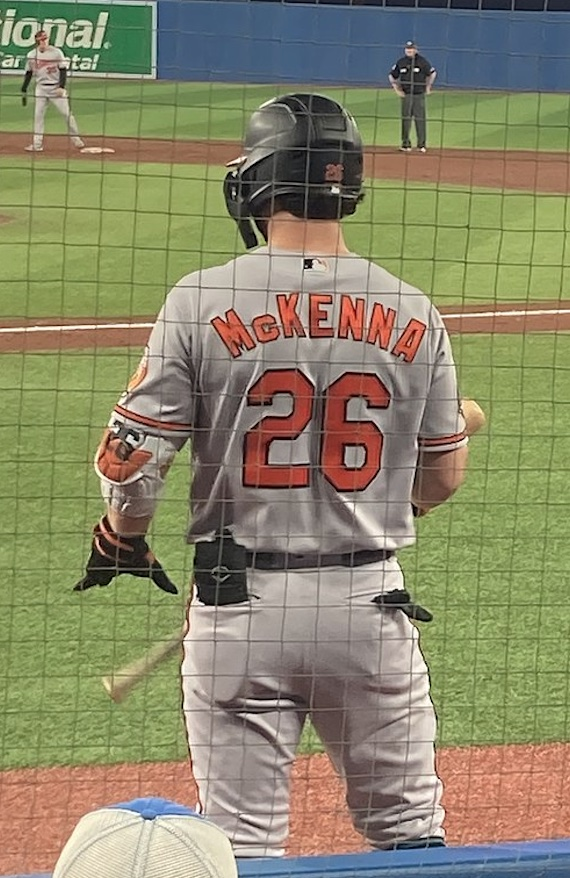
McKenna in 2022

The Baltimore Orioles selected McKenna in the fourth round of the 2015 MLB draft, making him the first New England high school player chosen in the draft. He subsequently signed with the Orioles and made his professional debut with the Gulf Coast Orioles of the Rookie-level Gulf Coast League, playing in only ten games due to an ankle injury. In 2016, he played for the Aberdeen IronBirds of the Low-A New York-Penn League, and batted .241 in 62 games. He played for the Delmarva Shorebirds of the Single-A South Atlantic League in 2017 where he batted .256 with seven home runs and 42 RBIs in 126 games.

McKenna began the 2018 season with the Frederick Keys of the High-A Carolina League, and earned a midseason promotion to the Bowie Baysox of the Double-A Eastern League. After the 2018 season, he played for the Glendale Desert Dogs of the Arizona Fall League. He returned to Bowie to start the 2019 season. McKenna was added to the Orioles 40–man roster following the 2019 season. McKenna did not play in a game in 2020 due to the cancellation of the minor league season because of the COVID-19 pandemic.

On April 5, 2021, McKenna was promoted to the major leagues for the first time to fill in for Austin Hays, who was dealing with a hamstring strain. He made his MLB debut that day as the starting right fielder against the New York Yankees. He collected his first major league hit on April 11, a triple off of Nick Pivetta of the Boston Red Sox. On July 25, McKenna collected his first career home run with a solo shot off of Washington Nationals starter Paolo Espino. He finished his rookie campaign playing in 90 games and batting .183/.292/.266 with 2 home runs and 14 RBI. In 2022, McKenna played in a career–high 104 games for the Orioles, used often as a defensive replacement late in games. In 156 at–bats, he hit .237/.294/.340 with 2 home runs and 11 RBI.

On April 1, 2023, in a game against the Boston Red Sox, McKenna dropped a Masataka Yoshida fly ball with 2 outs in the bottom of the 9th inning and the Orioles ahead by 1 run. Catching the ball would have ended the game and given the Orioles the win. Baltimore, leading 7–1 at one point, would lose the game after the next batter, Adam Duvall, hit a walk-off 2-run homerun two pitches later off of Félix Bautista. On June 24, McKenna entered a game against the Seattle Mariners in the ninth inning as a defensive replacement for Anthony Santander. In the bottom of the tenth, McKenna came up to bat in Santander's spot, and hit a two–run, walk–off home run off of Justin Topa to seal the comeback for Baltimore. In 88 games for the Orioles in 2023, he hit .254/.316/.361 with two home runs and 18 RBI.

McKenna was optioned to Triple–A Norfolk to begin the 2024 season. However, on March 28, 2024, McKenna was designated for assignment following multiple roster moves. He cleared waivers and was sent outright to Norfolk on March 31. On April 26, McKenna had his contract selected to the major league roster, replacing the struggling Jackson Holliday, who was sent down to Triple–A Norfolk. In nine games for Baltimore, he went 3–for–8 (.375) with two home runs and two RBI. On May 13, McKenna was designated for assignment after Austin Hays returned from the injured list.

=== San Francisco Giants ===
On May 18, 2024, McKenna was claimed off waivers by the San Francisco Giants. In four games for the Giants, he went 0–for–6 with one stolen base. On May 28, McKenna was designated for assignment by San Francisco. He cleared waivers and was sent outright to the Triple–A Sacramento River Cats on May 31. In 18 games for Sacramento, he hit .227/.308/.349 with two home runs, eight RBI, and six stolen bases. He also played in eight additional games split between the rookie–level Arizona Complex League Giants and Double–A Richmond Flying Squirrels. McKenna was released by the Giants organization on August 3.

=== Philadelphia Phillies ===
On August 5, 2024, McKenna signed a minor league contract with the Philadelphia Phillies organization. He made 25 appearances for the Triple-A Lehigh Valley IronPigs, slashing .190/.296/.345 with two home runs, 13 RBI, and six stolen bases. McKenna elected free agency following the season on November 6.

On June 9, 2026, after a year of inactivity, McKenna announced his retirement from professional baseball.
