= Jordan Westburg =

American baseball player (born 1999)

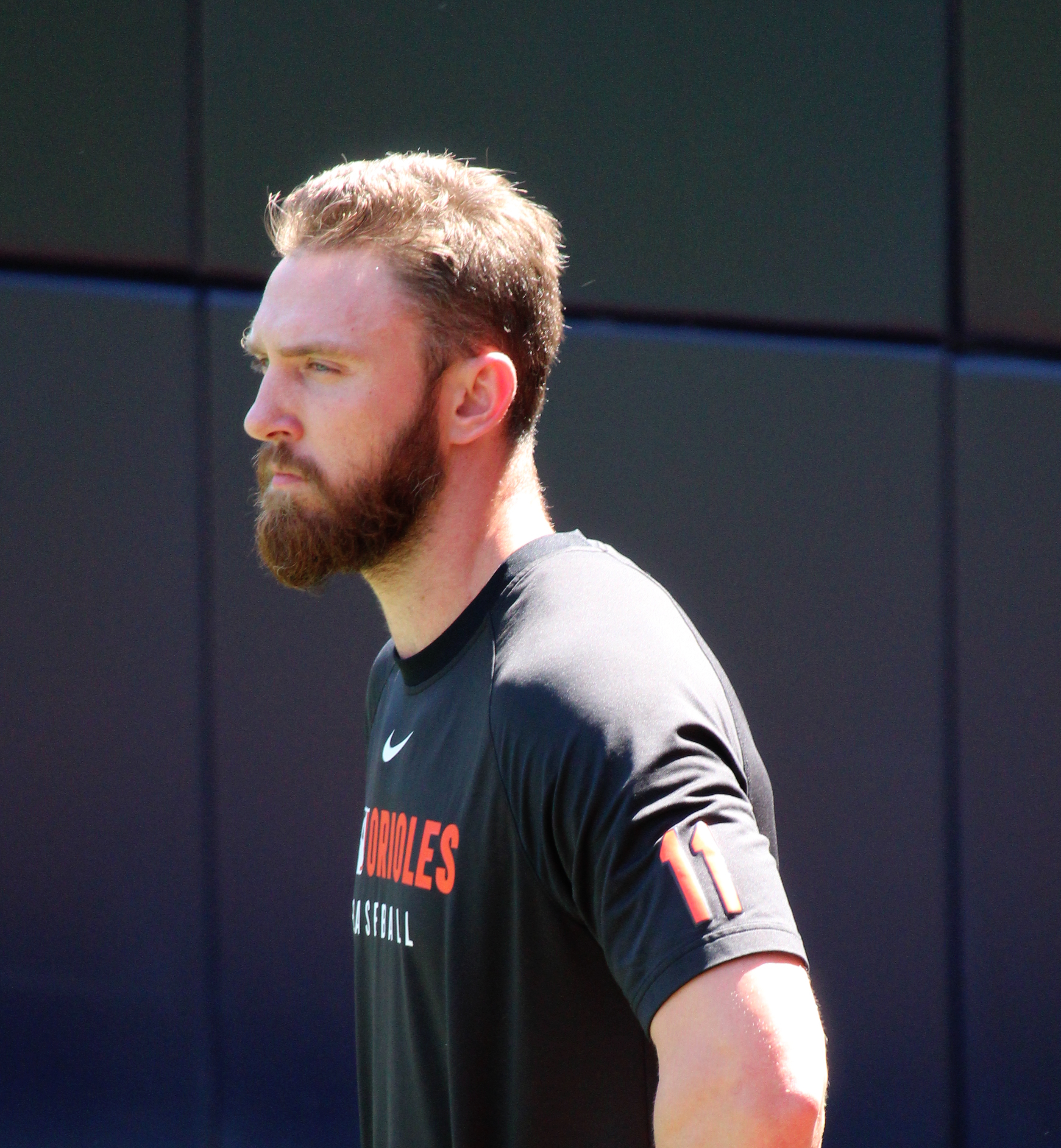
- Westburg with the Orioles in 2025

Baltimore Orioles – No. 11
- Infielder
- Born: February 18, 1999 (age 27); New Braunfels, Texas, U.S.
- Bats: Right Throws: Right

MLB debut
- June 26, 2023, for the Baltimore Orioles

MLB statistics (through 2025 season)
- Batting average: .264
- Home runs: 38
- Runs batted in: 127
- Stats at Baseball Reference

Teams
- Baltimore Orioles (2023–2025)

Career highlights and awards
- All-Star (2024)

Jordan Cole Westburg (born February 18, 1999) is an American professional baseball infielder for the Baltimore Orioles of Major League Baseball (MLB). While he was primarily a shortstop throughout college and the minor leagues, he has mainly played second and third base since his MLB debut in 2023.

== Amateur career ==
Westburg attended New Braunfels High School in New Braunfels, Texas, where he played baseball, basketball, and football. He was a fellow baseball teammate and 2017 graduate with Bryce Miller. They grew up in the same neighborhood and were childhood friends.

Westburg committed to play college baseball at Mississippi State University after his junior year. As a senior in 2017, he batted .457 with four home runs and 22 RBIs, earning All-State honors. Undrafted in the 2017 Major League Baseball draft, he enrolled at Mississippi State.

In 2018, Westburg's freshman year with the Mississippi State Bulldogs, he appeared in 42 games (making 31 starts) in which he batted .248 with two home runs and thirty RBIs. He missed over two weeks due to a hamstring injury. As a sophomore in 2019, Westburg started 66 games, hitting .300 with six home runs and 61 RBIs. He earned Southeastern Conference Player of the Week in March, batting .476 with two home runs and 11 RBIs over five games. That summer, he played in the Cape Cod Baseball League for the Hyannis Harbor Hawks alongside being named to the USA Baseball Collegiate National Team. In 2020, his junior season, he batted .317 with two home runs and 11 RBIs over 16 games before the college baseball season was cut short due to the COVID-19 pandemic.

== Professional career ==
=== Minor leagues ===
The Baltimore Orioles selected Westburg with the 30th overall pick in the 2020 Major League Baseball draft. Westburg signed with the Orioles on June 28, 2020, for a $2.3 million bonus. He did not play in a game in 2020 due to the cancellation of the minor league season because of the COVID-19 pandemic.

Westburg made his professional debut in 2021 with the Delmarva Shorebirds of the Low-A East. On June 1, he was promoted to the Aberdeen IronBirds of the High-A East. In mid-August, he was promoted to the Bowie Baysox of the Double-A Northeast. Over 112 games between the three affiliates, Westburg slashed .285/.389/.479 with 15 home runs, 79 RBI, 17 stolen bases, and 27 doubles. He returned to Bowie to begin the 2022 season. After batting .247 with nine home runs and 32 RBI over 47 games, Westburg was promoted to the Norfolk Tides of the Triple-A International League in early June. Over 91 games with Norfolk to end the season, he batted .273 with 18 home runs and 74 RBI. To open the 2023 season, he returned to Norfolk. In 67 games for Norfolk, Westburg hit .295/.372/.567 with 18 home runs and 54 RBI.

=== Major leagues ===
Westburg was selected to the 40-man roster and promoted to the major leagues for the first time on June 26, 2023. He drew a walk in the rain and scored a run in the second inning, drove in a run with a fielder's choice in the third and hit a one-out single in the fifth in his first three plate appearances as the starting second baseman in his MLB debut that night in as the Orioles defeated the Cincinnati Reds at Camden Yards by a score of 10–3. Westburg hit his first major league home run on July 24 off Philadelphia Phillies starter Cristopher Sanchez at Citizens Bank Park. He played the remainder of the season with the Orioles following his promotion, and hit .260 with three home runs and 23 RBI across 68 games.

Westburg began the 2024 season in the Orioles' opening day lineup as the designated hitter against the Los Angeles Angels, and recorded an RBI single. On April 1, 2024, he hit a two-run walk off home run against the Kansas City Royals, sealing a 6-4 Orioles win. It was his first walk-off of any kind in MLB, and Westburg additionally stated he had never walked off a game at any level of baseball before. The following month, he would record his second walk-off hit in a May 11 game against the Arizona Diamondbacks. In the bottom of the 11th inning, Westburg hit a single on the first pitch of his at bat to score the runner from second base and end an extra-innings game with a 5-4 win. He also recorded a career high four hits in the same game, going 4-for-5 at the plate. Westburg enjoyed a successful first half of 2024 and was named to the 2024 Major League Baseball All-Star Game. He entered the All-Star break hitting .271/.318/.496, with 15 home runs and 50 RBI. He went on the injured list after sustaining a fracture in his right hand when he was hit by a Yerry Rodríguez pitch in the fifth inning of a 10–4 home win over the Toronto Blue Jays on July 31. He missed nearly two months before he was activated on September 22. Westburg played in a total of 107 games for Baltimore and batted .264 with 18 home runs and 63 RBI.

Westburg returned as Baltimore's starting third baseman in 2025, while also spending time at second base and as a designated hitter. He set an MLB career-best five RBI in an Orioles' 12–0 away win over the Houston Astros on August 17, 2025. He missed time during the season due to a hamstring strain and an ankle sprain. Westburg made 85 appearances for Baltimore during the regular season and slashed .265/.313/.457 with 17 home runs and 41 RBI.

On February 20, 2026, Westburg was diagnosed with a partial tear of the ulnar collateral ligament in his right elbow; he later received a platelet-rich plasma injection to help address the malady. He was transferred to the 60-day injured list on April 1. On May 15, it was announced that Westburg would undergo elbow surgery to repair his partially torn UCL, ending his season without appearing in a game.
