= Anthony Santander =

Venezuelan baseball player (born 1994)

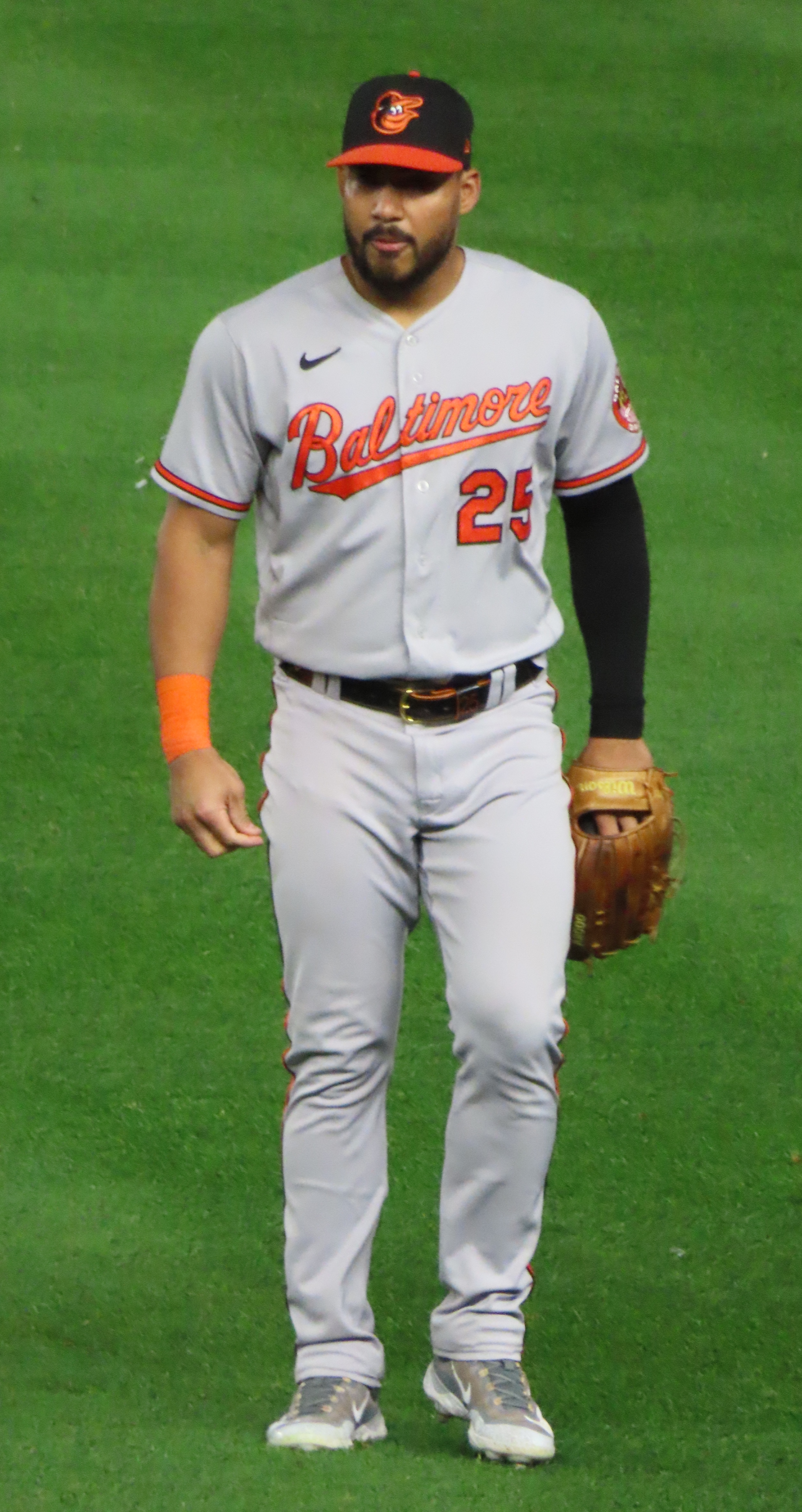
- Santander with the Orioles in 2023

Toronto Blue Jays – No. 25
- Outfielder
- Born: October 19, 1994 (age 32); Margarita Island, Venezuela
- Bats: Switch Throws: Right

MLB debut
- August 18, 2017, for the Baltimore Orioles

MLB statistics (through 2025 season)
- Batting average: .241
- Home runs: 161
- Runs batted in: 453
- Stats at Baseball Reference

Teams
- Baltimore Orioles (2017–2024); Toronto Blue Jays (2025)

Career highlights and awards
- All-Star (2024); Silver Slugger Award (2024)

Anthony Roger Santander (born October 19, 1994) is a Venezuelan professional baseball outfielder for the Toronto Blue Jays of Major League Baseball (MLB). He has previously played in MLB for the Baltimore Orioles. He made his MLB debut in 2017 and was an All-Star in 2024.

== Early life ==
Santander was born on Margarita Island, off the Venezuelan coast, but says he 'feels more connected' to Agua Blanca, where he grew up.

== Career ==
=== Cleveland Indians ===
Santander signed with the Cleveland Indians as an international free agent on July 2, 2011. He made his professional debut in 2012 for the Arizona League Indians. From 2013 to 2015 he played for the Lake County Captains. He injured his right elbow in 2013, and missed part of the 2014 season—when he batted .184/.260/.270 for the Captains—with a right elbow strain. He also played in eight games for the Mahoning Valley Scrappers in 2015. Santander spent 2016 with the Lynchburg Hillcats where he posted a .290 batting average with 20 home runs and 95 RBIs.

=== Baltimore Orioles ===
On December 8, 2016, the Baltimore Orioles selected Santander from the Indians in the Rule 5 draft. He made his major league debut on August 18, 2017, at Camden Yards, Baltimore against the Los Angeles Angels. In 30 at bats he batted .267/.258/.367.

Santander matched teammate Renato Núñez's achievement from eleven days prior with his own first-ever five-hit game in an 8–3 home win over the Tampa Bay Rays three weeks later on August 25, 2019. In 93 games, he hit 20 home runs with 59 runs batted in.

In 37 games for the Orioles in 2020, Santander batted .261/.315/.575 with 11 home runs and 32 RBI. He was awarded the 2020 Louis M. Hatter Most Valuable Oriole Award by members of the local media. On February 5, 2021, Santander lost his arbitration hearing against the Orioles and had his 2021 salary set at $2.1 million instead of $2.4 million.

In mid-June 2022, Santander was placed on the restricted list ahead of a series in Toronto against the Blue Jays due to being unvaccinated against COVID-19. He tied an MLB record set by Ken Caminiti in 1996 by hitting home runs from both sides of the plate in a game for the fourth time in a single season in a 13–9 loss to the Boston Red Sox at Fenway Park on September 27, 2022. He also became the first Orioles player with three multi-homer games in a four-game span. In 2022, Santander led major league batters in pop up percentage (15.8%), and batted .240/.318/.455 in 574 at–bats.

On January 13, 2023, Santander agreed to a one-year, $7.4 million contract with the Orioles, avoiding salary arbitration. He achieved his first MLB grand slam and five-RBI game in a 9–4 away win over the Atlanta Braves on May 5. His seventh-inning slam off Joe Jiménez while batting left-handed was his second home run of the match, both from opposite sides of the plate. He hit a right-handed solo homer off Max Fried in the fourth. On May 15, Santander started his first career game at first base, batting third against the Los Angeles Angels. His two-run homer off Steven Okert in the first inning of a 5–4 home win over the Miami Marlins on July 16 was the 100th of his MLB career. In 2023, he batted .257/.325/.472, and had the highest fly ball percentage (49.7%) and the lowest line drive percentage of all AL batters (15.3%).

Santander was selected to the All-Star Game for the first time in 2024. He equaled his career-high five RBI in a pair of Orioles away victories that season over the Cincinnati Reds and Texas Rangers on May 5 and July 19 respectively. The first of those two featured his third career grand slam in the ninth off Emilio Pagán. He hit a pair of homers to establish a new career-high in a season with 34 in a 7–3 away triumph over the Blue Jays on August 7. He surpassed Ken Singleton's 1979 franchise record for most homers by a switch-hitter in a season with his 36th off Jake Irvin in a 9–3 home loss to the Washington Nationals six days later on August 13. In 2024, Santander batted .235/.308/.506 with 44 home runs and 102 RBIs, and led MLB with the highest fly ball percentage, at 54.8%.

=== Toronto Blue Jays ===
On January 20, 2025, Santander signed a five-year, $92.5 million contract with the Toronto Blue Jays. He batted 179/.273/.304 with six home runs and 18 RBI over 50 games before he was placed on the injured list with left shoulder inflammation on May 30. Santander was transferred to the 60-day injured list on July 4. He was activated on September 23, and recorded one hit and one walk across four additional games. Santander made the Blue Jays' MLB postseason roster, but was replaced with Joey Loperfido during the 2025 American League Championship Series due to back tightness.

On February 10, 2026, it was announced that Santander would miss five-to-six months due to left labral surgery. Six months later, on September 9, Santander began a rehab assignment with the Buffalo Bisons, recording his first hit of the year two days later. He ended up not appearing in a major league game in 2026.

== International career ==
Santander was selected to the Venezuela national team at the 2023 World Baseball Classic.

== Personal life ==
Santander has stated that he has a supportive family, and that he is a religious person.

In November 2026, following midterm elections in the United States, Santander reposted Islamophobic videos to his Instagram account, which claimed that Muslim elected officials aimed to impose Sharia law in the U.S. and described Islam as "not peaceful" and "driven by war." The posts were deleted following backlash from fans online.

== See also ==
- Rule 5 draft results
