= Josh Lester =

American baseball player (born 1994)

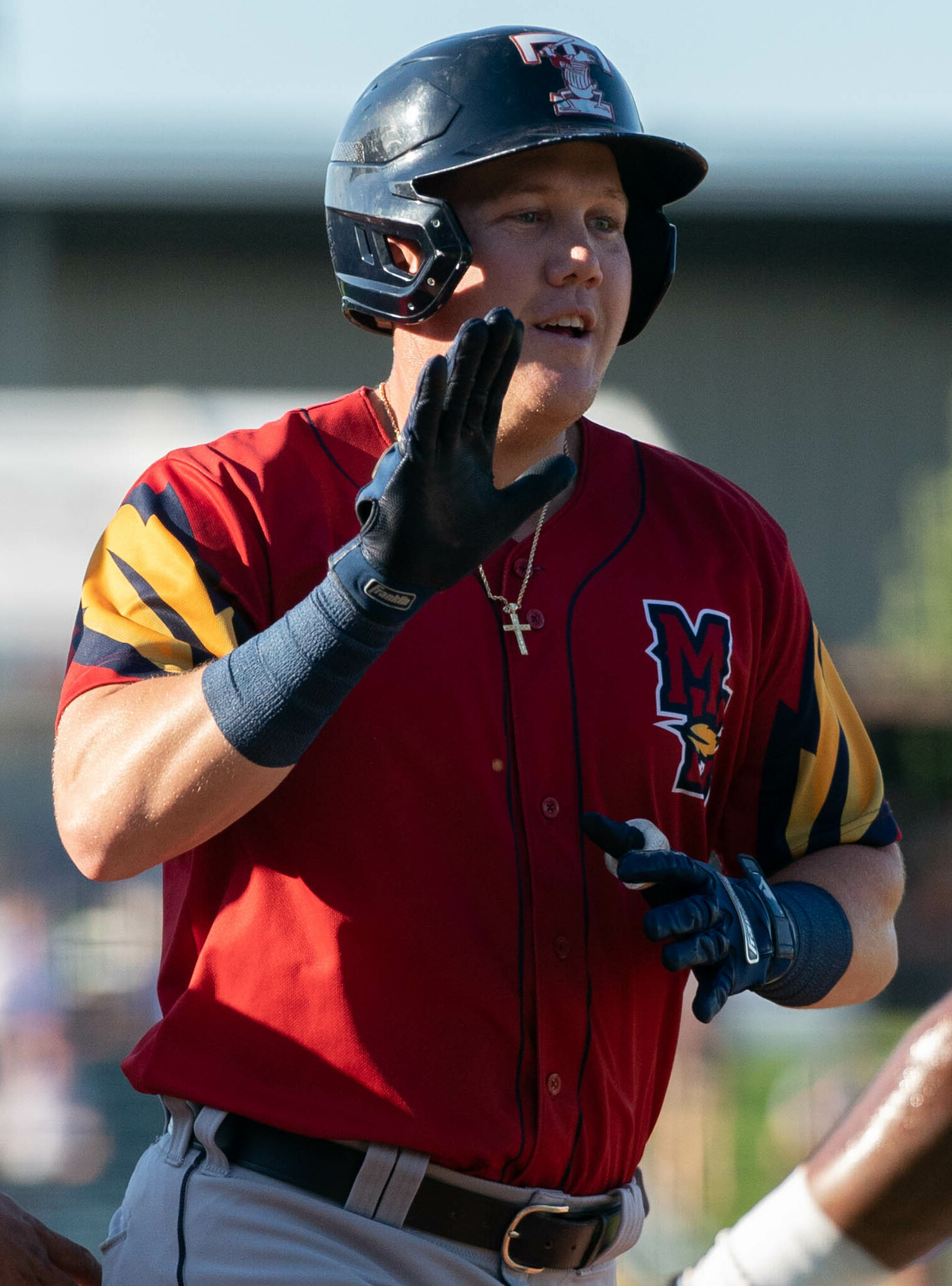
- Lester with the Toledo Mud Hens in 2022

Sultanes de Monterrey – No. 58
- Utility infielder
- Born: July 17, 1994 (age 32); Columbus, Georgia, U.S.
- Bats: Left Throws: Right

MLB debut
- September 5, 2022, for the Detroit Tigers

MLB statistics (through 2023 season)
- Batting average: .148
- Home runs: 0
- Runs batted in: 4
- Stats at Baseball Reference

Teams
- Detroit Tigers (2022); Baltimore Orioles (2023)

Joshua Benjamin Lester (born July 17, 1994) is an American professional baseball utility infielder for the Sultanes de Monterrey of the Mexican League. He has previously played in Major League Baseball (MLB) for the Detroit Tigers and Baltimore Orioles.

== Amateur career ==
A native of Columbus, Georgia, Lester was part of the Columbus team that won the 2006 Little League World Series. After the win he was interviewed by ESPN's Erin Andrews and was in tears. Lester attended Columbus High School and the University of Missouri, where he played college baseball for the Missouri Tigers. In 2014, he played collegiate summer baseball with the Yarmouth–Dennis Red Sox of the Cape Cod Baseball League.

== Professional career ==
=== Detroit Tigers ===
The Detroit Tigers selected Lester in the 13th round, with the 400th overall selection, of the 2015 Major League Baseball draft, and he signed. After signing, he played for the rookie-level Gulf Coast League Tigers, Low-A Connecticut Tigers and the Single-A West Michigan Whitecaps, hitting .224 across 49 total games. In 2016, Lester split the year between Connecticut and West Michigan, playing in 79 games and slashing .262/.328/.369 with two home runs and 28 RBI.

In 2017, Lester played for West Michigan and the High–A Lakeland Flying Tigers. He played in a total of 110 games, batting .272/.306/.439 with 13 home runs and 66 RBI. Lester spent the 2018 season with the Double-A Erie SeaWolves, playing in 127 contests and hitting .259/.346/.455 with career highs in home runs (21) and RBI (75). In 2019, Lester played in 106 games for Double-A Erie, hitting .223/.290/.414 with 17 home runs and 54 RBI. He was promoted to the Triple-A Toledo Mud Hens late in the year, and hit .216 with seven home runs and 13 RBI in 18 games.

Lester did not play in 2020 due to the cancellation of the minor-league season because of the COVID-19 pandemic. He returned to action in 2021, and split the year between Double-A Erie and Triple-A Toledo. In 109 games, he accumulated a .263/.324/.587 batting line with 32 home runs and 78 RBI. Lester returned to Toledo for the 2022 season, playing in 145 games and hitting .246/.311/.469 with 29 home runs and a career-high 99 RBI.

On September 4, 2022, Lester was selected to the 40-man roster and promoted to the major leagues for the first time following an injury to Miguel Cabrera. He made his Major League debut the next day. In two games for Detroit, Lester went 0–for–5 with three strikeouts. He was removed from the 40-man roster and sent outright to Triple-A on November 9, 2022. He elected minor-league free agency following the next day.

=== Baltimore Orioles ===
On December 6, 2022, Lester signed a minor-league contract with the Baltimore Orioles organization. He was assigned to the Triple-A Norfolk Tides to begin the 2023 season, where he played in 52 games and hit .282/.339/.549 with 14 home runs and 50 RBI. On June 3, 2023, Lester had his contract selected to the major league roster after Danny Coulombe was placed on the bereavement list. On June 4, Lester recorded his first career hit, a two-run single off of San Francisco Giants starter Anthony DeSclafani. In 11 games for Baltimore, he batted .182/.217/.182 with no home runs and four RBI. On July 19, Lester was designated for assignment by the Orioles following the acquisition of Shintaro Fujinami. He cleared waivers and was sent outright to Triple-A Norfolk on July 26. On October 4, Lester elected free agency.

=== Kansas City Royals ===
On February 18, 2024, Lester signed a minor league contract with Kansas City Royals. In 116 appearances split between the Double-A Northwest Arkansas Naturals and Triple-A Omaha Storm Chasers, he batted a combined .259/.327/.450 with 18 home runs and 71 RBI. Lester elected free agency following the season on November 4.

=== Sultanes de Monterrey ===
On April 15, 2025, Lester signed with the Sultanes de Monterrey of the Mexican League. In 81 games, he hit .318/.416/.587 with 17 home runs and 56 RBIs. On June 15, 2026, Lester was announced he would play in the LMB All-Star Game and be in the Home Run Derby. On June 27, 2026, Lester hit 11 home runs in the first round in the Home Run Derby. He hit one home run in the second round, finishing in third place.
