= Ryan O'Hearn =

American baseball player (born 1993)

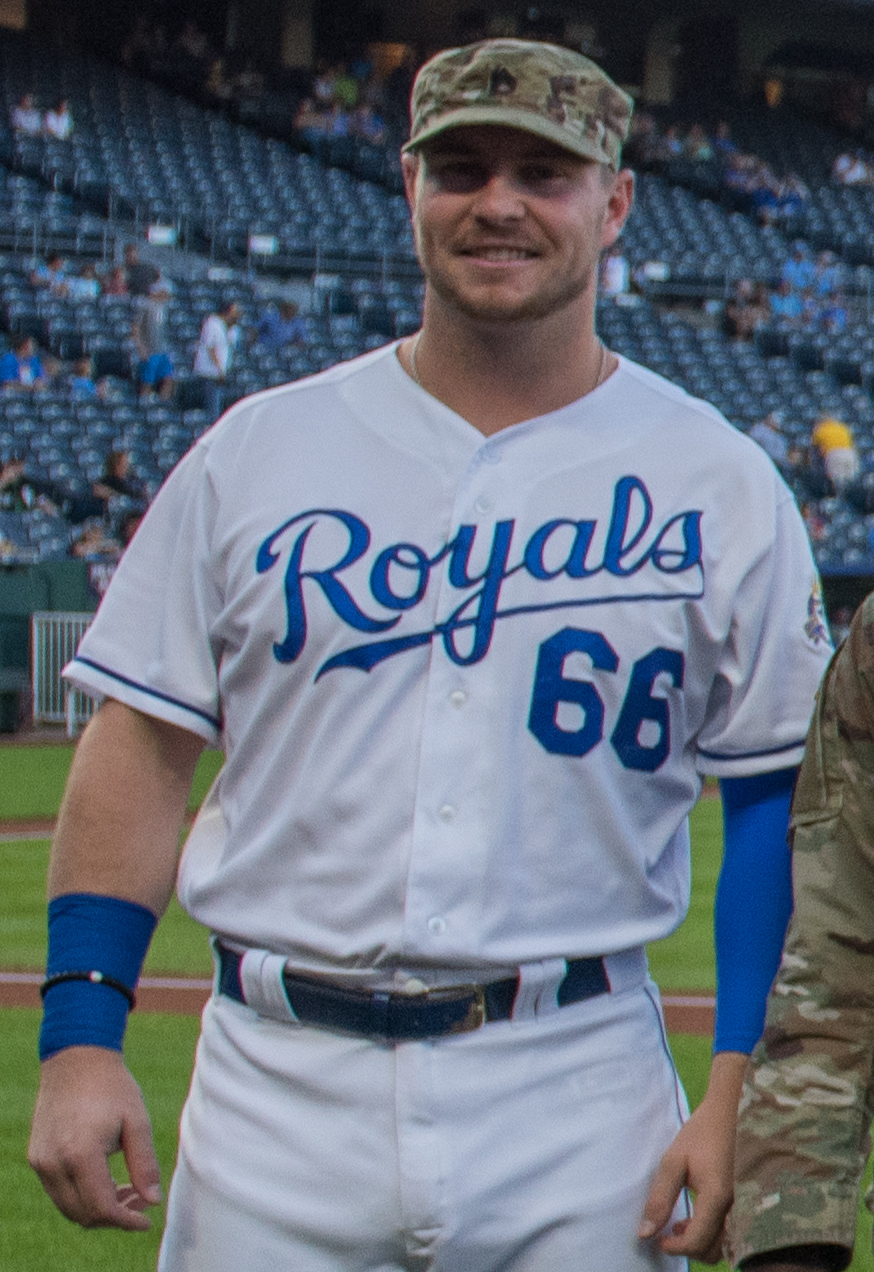
- O'Hearn with the Kansas City Royals in 2018

Pittsburgh Pirates – No. 29
- First baseman / Right fielder
- Born: July 26, 1993 (age 33); Dunedin, Florida, U.S.
- Bats: Left Throws: Left

MLB debut
- July 31, 2018, for the Kansas City Royals

MLB statistics (through 2026 season)
- Batting average: .254
- Home runs: 102
- Runs batted in: 389
- Stats at Baseball Reference

Teams
- Kansas City Royals (2018–2022); Baltimore Orioles (2023–2025); San Diego Padres (2025); Pittsburgh Pirates (2026–present)

Career highlights and awards
- All-Star (2025)

Ryan Patrick O'Hearn (born July 26, 1993) is an American professional baseball first baseman and right fielder for the Pittsburgh Pirates of Major League Baseball (MLB). He has previously played in MLB for the Kansas City Royals, Baltimore Orioles, and San Diego Padres. O'Hearn was an All-Star in 2025.

== Amateur career ==
O'Hearn graduated from Wakeland High School in Frisco, Texas. As a senior, he hit .505 with 15 home runs and 55 runs batted in (RBI), earning a spot on Baseball America's second team High School All-American team. He was not drafted out of high school in the 2011 MLB draft and he enrolled and played college baseball at Sam Houston State University. In 2014, his junior season, he batted .292 with eight home runs and 44 RBIs in 62 games.

== Professional career ==
=== Kansas City Royals ===
The Kansas City Royals selected O'Hearn in the eighth round of the 2014 Major League Baseball draft. He signed and spent 2014 with the Idaho Falls Chukars, batting .361(5th in the Pioneer League)/.444(5th)/.590(5th) in 249 at bats with 61 runs (leading the Pioneer League), 16 doubles (6th), 13 home runs (3rd), and 54 RBIs (4th), 39 walks (3rd), in 64 games. He was named Pioneer League MVP and a postseason all-star.

O'Hearn started 2015 with the Lexington Legends, and after batting .277 with 19 home runs and 56 RBIs in 314 at bats, and being named a mid-season all star, was promoted to the Wilmington Blue Rocks where he finished the season, posting a .236 batting average with eight home runs and 21 RBIs. He spent 2016 with both Wilmington and the Northwest Arkansas Naturals, slashing a combined .275/.351/.478 with 22 home runs and 78 RBIs in 134 total games between both teams, and 2017 with the Omaha Storm Chasers and Northwest Arkansas, batting a combined .253 with 22 home runs and 64 RBIs in 133 total games.

O'Hearn was called up to the major leagues on July 31, 2018, and hit a home run in his first game. He ended the 2018 MLB season batting .262/.353/.597 in 149 at-bats with 12 home runs and 30 RBI in 44 games. O'Hearn struggled offensively in 2019 at the MLB level, hitting only .195 with 14 home runs and 38 RBI, while at Triple-A Omaha he batted .295/.383/.597 in 129 at-bats with 9 home runs and 28 RBI.

On July 7, 2020, it was announced that O'Hearn had tested positive for COVID-19. Overall with the 2020 Kansas City Royals, O'Hearn batted .195 in 113 at bats with two home runs and 18 RBIs in 42 games.

In 2021, with the Omaha Storm Chasers, O'Hearn batted .375/.451/.931 with 15 home runs and 25 RBI in 72 at-bats. With the Royals, he batted .225/.268/.369 with 9 home runs and 29 RBI in 84 games.

O'Hearn was designated for assignment on December 28, 2022, creating a roster spot filled when the Royals signed Jordan Lyles.

=== Baltimore Orioles ===
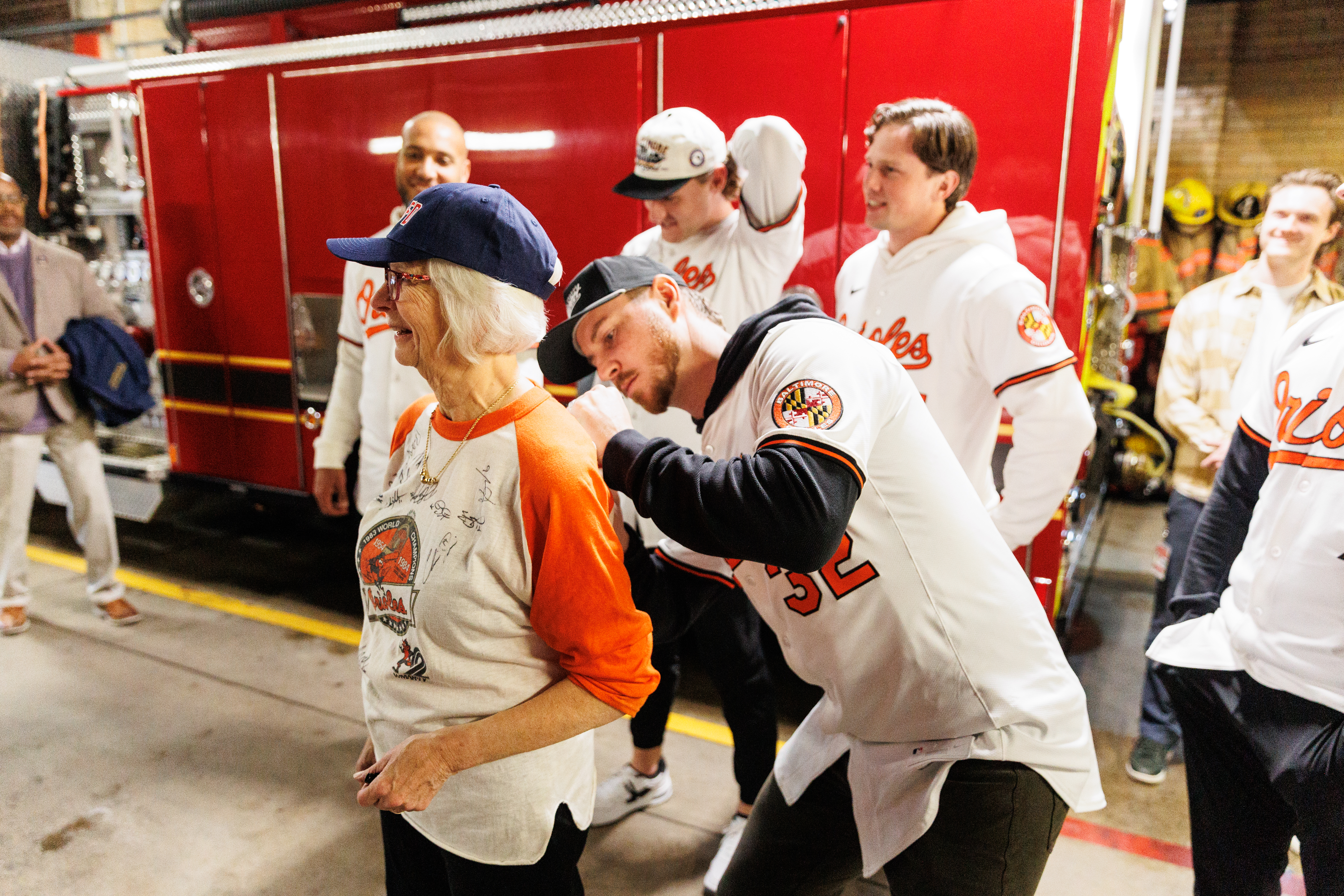
O'Hearn signs the shirt of Baltimore County Executive Kathy Klausmeier, 2025

On January 3, 2023, O'Hearn was traded to the Baltimore Orioles in exchange for cash considerations. On January 5, O’Hearn was designated for assignment by Baltimore following the waiver claim of Lewin Díaz. On January 12, O'Hearn was sent outright to the Triple-A Norfolk Tides. O'Hearn hit .375 with 3 home runs in 40 at-bats in spring training, but was ultimately reassigned to Triple-A Norfolk to begin the season. At Norfolk, he batted .354/.404/.729 in 48 at-bats with four home runs and 13 RBI.

On April 13, 2023, the Orioles selected O'Hearn's contract, adding him to the major league roster. He made his Orioles debut in an 8–7 win over the Oakland Athletics that afternoon was his first three-RBI game in two years. He has had four RBI in at least two away games during the season. The first was in a 10-inning 6–5 victory over the Toronto Blue Jays on May 20, highlighted by his three-run homer off Jordan Romano that tied the contest at 5–5 in the eighth. The other was in a 14–1 triumph over the New York Yankees on July 6.

O'Hearn was cheaply acquired from the Royals, and as such was not expected to play regularly, other than as a left-handed pinch-hitter to face right-handed pitchers. At the end of May, O'Hearn had only recorded 48 plate appearances, appearing in 17 out of 43 possible Orioles games. His strong showing in these opportunities, with a .615 slugging percentage in May, as well as Ryan Mountcastle missing a month due to symptoms of vertigo, led to more playing time as the season continued. In addition to benefiting from new MLB rules designed to reduce the effectiveness of the shift, O'Hearn was noted for his ability to consistently hit the ball with power, with a high rate of hard-hit balls as measured by the exit velocity of the ball off of the bat. In 2023, he recorded an average exit velocity of 91.9 mph, with over half of his batted balls hit at 95 mph or more. These numbers placed him in the 89th and 94th percentile of hitters respectively.

O'Hearn set a career-high for hits in a game when he had five hits, going 5-for-5 at the plate, in an 8–7 away win over the Houston Astros on September 18. In 2023 with the Orioles he batted .289/.322/.480 with 14 home runs and 60 RBI in 346 at-bats, while stealing five bases in six attempts. O'Hearn was recognised by fans as a key contributor and an affordable yet dependable platoon hitter.

O'Hearn made 142 appearances for the Orioles during the 2024 campaign, batting .264/.334/.427 with 15 home runs, 59 RBI, and three stolen bases. He made 94 appearances for Baltimore in 2025, slashing .283/.374/.463 with 13 home runs, 43 RBI, and three stolen bases; he also received his first-career All-Star selection.

=== San Diego Padres ===
On July 31, 2025, the Orioles traded O'Hearn and Ramón Laureano to the San Diego Padres in exchange for Boston Bateman, Tyson Neighbors, Tanner Smith, Brandon Butterworth, Cobb Hightower, and Victor Figueroa. In 50 appearances for the Padres, O'Hearn slashed .276/.350/.387 with four home runs and 20 RBI.

=== Pittsburgh Pirates ===
On January 8, 2026, the Pittsburgh Pirates signed O'Hearn to a two-year, $29 million contract. On July 7, in a game against the Atlanta Braves, O'Hearn broke the Pirates' single-game RBI record with a 10 RBI, three-home run performance. On August 1, he was ruled out for 6–to–8 weeks after suffering a left quad strain.

== See also ==
- List of Major League Baseball single-game runs batted in leaders
