= Eduard Bazardo =

Venezuelan baseball player (born 1995)

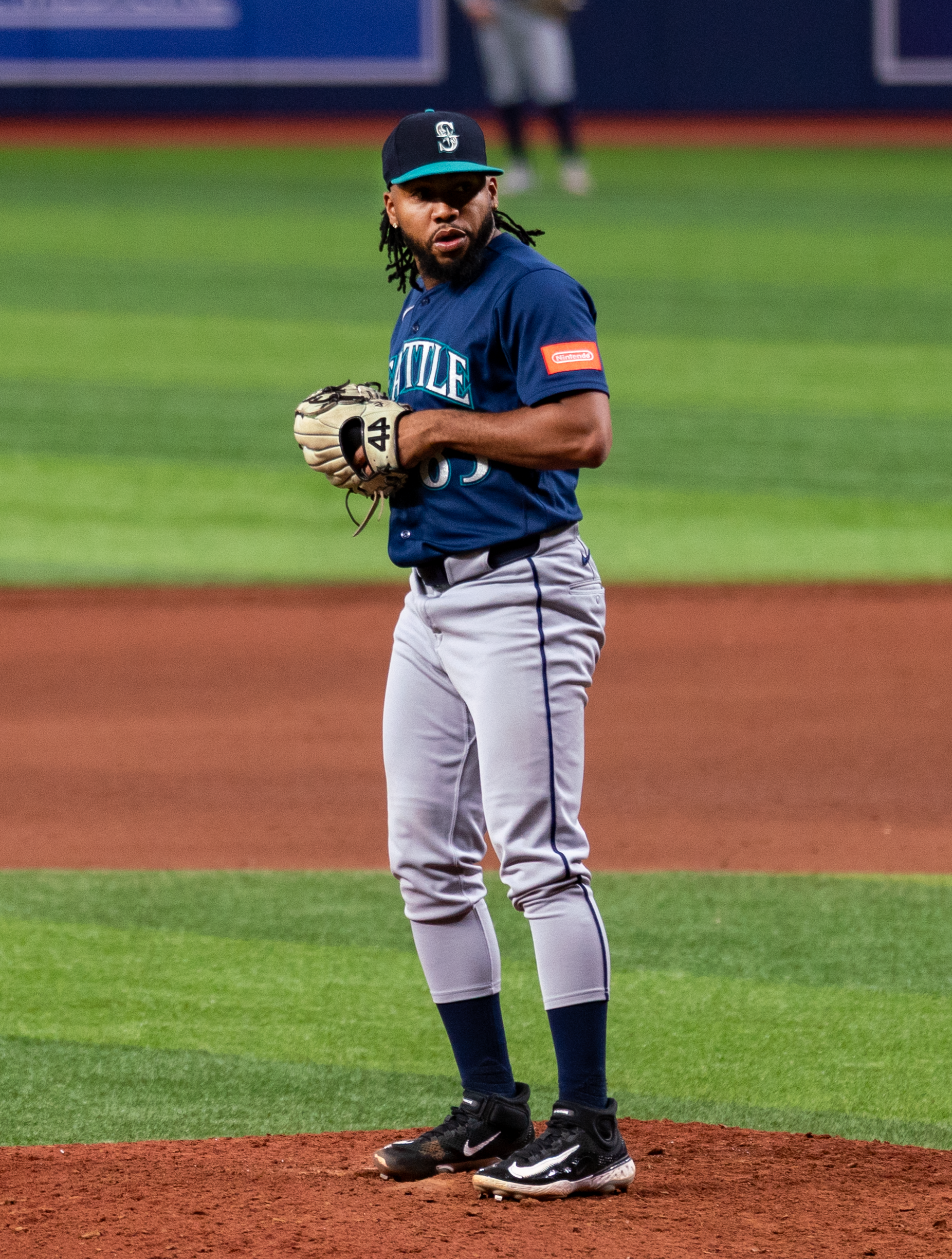
- Eduard Bazardo with the Seattle Mariners in 2026

Seattle Mariners – No. 83
- Pitcher
- Born: September 1, 1995 (age 31); Maracay, Venezuela
- Bats: Right Throws: Right

MLB debut
- April 14, 2021, for the Boston Red Sox

MLB statistics (through 2026 season)
- Win–loss record: 12-4
- Earned run average: 3.44
- Strikeouts: 214
- Stats at Baseball Reference

Teams
- Boston Red Sox (2021–2022); Baltimore Orioles (2023); Seattle Mariners (2023–present)
Medals
Men's baseball
Representing Venezuela
World Baseball Classic
Gold medal – first place	2026 Miami	Team

Eduard Felix Bazardo (born September 1, 1995) is a Venezuelan professional baseball pitcher for the Seattle Mariners of Major League Baseball (MLB). He has previously played in MLB for the Boston Red Sox and Baltimore Orioles.

== Career ==
=== Boston Red Sox ===
The Boston Red Sox signed Bazardo as an international free agent in July 2014 for $8,000. He played for the Dominican Summer League (DSL) Red Sox in 2015 and 2016. In 2017, he played for DSL Red Sox before joining the Gulf Coast League (GCL) Red Sox in late June. He pitched solely as a starter in 2018, starting with the Low-A Lowell Spinners and being promoted to the Single-A Greenville Drive in early August. In 2019, he returned to the bullpen and again played at two levels, beginning the year with the High-A Salem Red Sox and advancing to the Double-A Portland Sea Dogs in mid-June. Through 2019, Bazardo compiled a record of 23–19 in 100 games, including 31 starts, with 10 saves in five minor-league seasons. He had a 2.55 ERA and 342 strikeouts in 310 innings pitched.

After the 2020 minor league season was cancelled due to the COVID-19 pandemic, Bazardo pitched well in the Fall Instructional League. On November 20, 2020, he was added to Boston's 40-man roster. Bazardo was assigned to the team's alternate training site prior to the start of the 2021 season. On April 14, 2021, he was promoted to the major leagues for the first time for a scheduled doubleheader against the Minnesota Twins. He made his MLB debut that day, pitching a scoreless inning of relief. He returned to alternate site the next day. On May 12, Bazardo again joined the Red Sox for one day, pitching two scoreless innings before being sent down to the Triple-A Worcester Red Sox. On July 5, he recalled to the Red Sox and placed on the 60-day injured list with a right lat strain. He started a rehabilitation assignment with the Florida Complex League Red Sox on August 13, was optioned to Worcester Red Sox on September 13 and recalled to Boston on September 26. He did not pitch for the Red Sox in his final stint with the team in 2021 and was optioned back to Worcester on October 3, after the end of the regular season. In the 2021 regular season, Bazardo pitched twice for Boston, allowing no runs in three innings pitched, striking out three batters. With Worcester, he appeared in 11 games and registered three saves while pitching to an 8.74 ERA and striking out 12 batters in 11 1/3 innings.

Bazardo was designated for assignment on April 7, 2022. He cleared waivers and was sent outright to Worcester. In 37 games (including 4 starts) for Worcester, he had a 2–4 record and a 3.45 ERA. On September 1, when MLB active rosters by 2 players, Bazardo's contract was selected from Triple-A. On October 5, Bazardo earned his first career win after tossing a scoreless fifth inning in a 6–3 victory over the Tampa Bay Rays. In 12 games for Boston, all in relief, Bazardo registered one win and a 2.76 ERA and 11 strikeouts in 16 1/3 innings. On October 13, he was again designated for assignment. Four days later, he elected free agency.

=== Baltimore Orioles ===
On December 19, 2022, Bazardo signed a minor league contract with the Baltimore Orioles. He began the 2023 season with the Triple-A Norfolk Tides, pitching in 24 games and posting a 3.51 ERA with 39 strikeouts and 2 saves in 33 1/3 innings pitched. On July 5, the Orioles added Bazardo to their major league roster. He struggled in his three games with the Orioles, allowing 4 runs in 2 1/3 innings, before being sent down to Norfolk on July 17. On July 30, Bazardo was designated for assignment as the Orioles promoted Joey Krehbiel.

=== Seattle Mariners ===
On August 1, 2023, Bazardo was traded to the Seattle Mariners in exchange for Logan Rinehart. He joined the Tacoma Rainiers after the trade but was on the Mariners roster two times, from August 17 to 22 then again from September 10 until the end of the season. He pitched in 9 games for the Mariners, with a 2.63 ERA and 14 strikeouts in 13 2/3 innings.

Bazardo again split time between the majors and Triple-A in 2024, getting the most major league action of his career so far. He was 2–0 with a 4.88 ERA and 33 strikeouts in 27 2/3 innings. He was mostly a mop-up pitcher, having the third lowest average leverage index of any MLB pitcher. His performance in Tacoma was similar, with a 4.29 ERA in 21 innings.

In 2025, Bazardo found a spot in Seattle's bullpen for the entirety of the season, pitching a career-high 78 2/3 innings, the most of any Mariners reliever in 2025. Bazardo posted a 2.52 ERA and struck out 82 batters while pitching as a high-leverage arm in Seattle's bullpen. In Game 5 of the 2025 American League Division Series against the Detroit Tigers, Bazardo pitched a career-high 2 2/3 scoreless innings deep into extras, striking out four as the Mariners would go on to win the game and the series in the 15th inning. In the decisive Game 7 of the American League Championship Series against the Toronto Blue Jays, Bazardo surrendered a go-ahead 3-run home run in the 7th inning to George Springer, which would ultimately be the game's winning runs as the Blue Jays eliminated the Mariners, 4–3.

== Personal life ==
Bazardo's older brother Yorman Bazardo pitched in MLB in 2005 and from 2007–2009.
