= Lewin Díaz =

Dominican baseball player (born 1996)

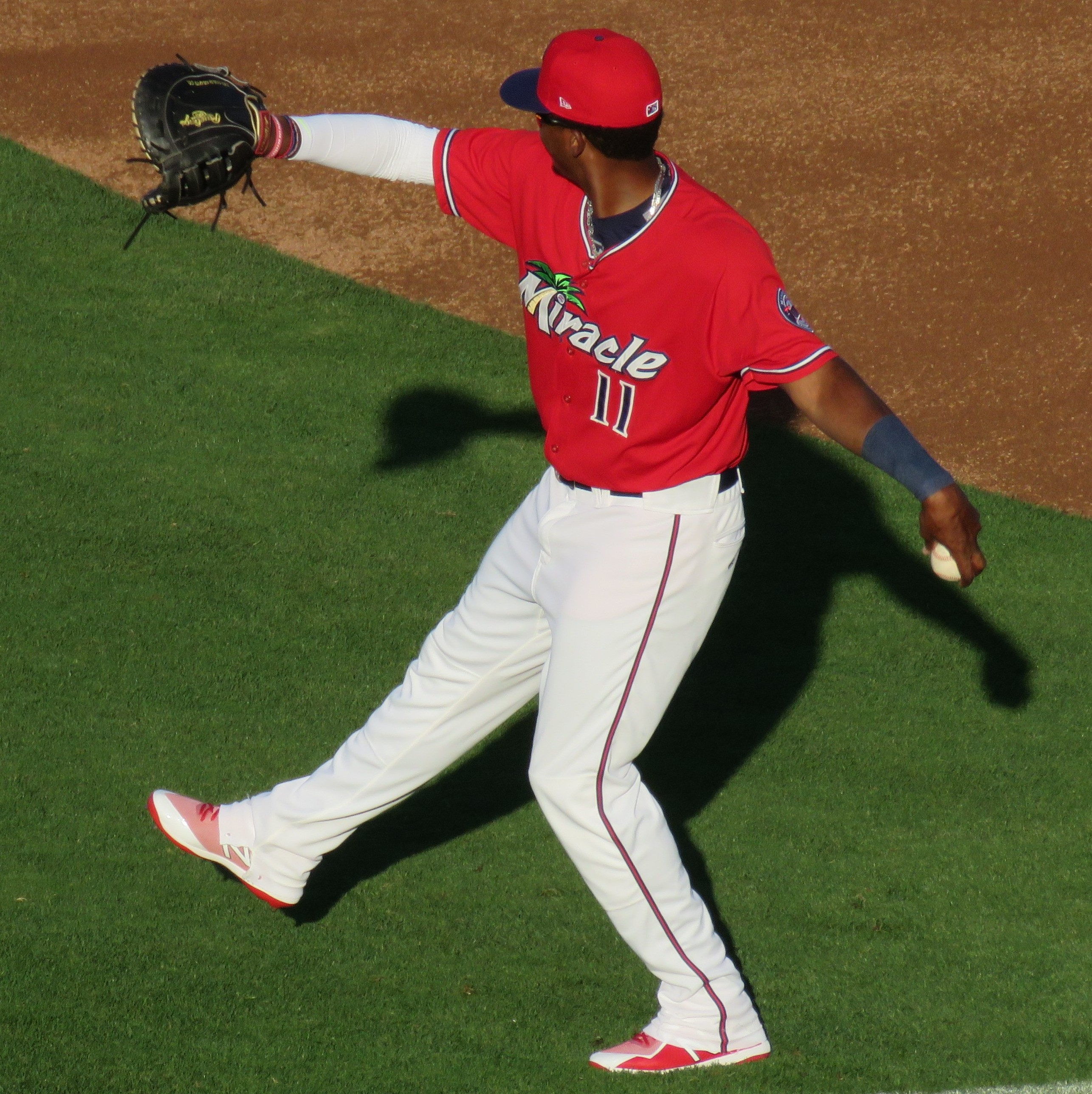
- Diaz with the Fort Myers Miracle

Samsung Lions – No. 0
- First baseman
- Born: November 19, 1996 (age 30); Santiago, Dominican Republic
- Bats: Left Throws: Left

Professional debut
- MLB: August 15, 2020, for the Miami Marlins
- KBO: August 17, 2024, for the Samsung Lions

MLB statistics (through 2022 season)
- Batting average: .181
- Home runs: 13
- Runs batted in: 27

KBO statistics (through August 21, 2026)
- Batting average: .306
- Home runs: 76
- Runs batted in: 272
- Stats at Baseball Reference

Teams
- Miami Marlins (2020–2022); Samsung Lions (2024–present)

Career highlights and awards
- KBO: KBO Triple Crown (2025); KBO Golden Glove Award (2025); KBO Defensive Award (2025); 2× KBO All-Star (2025-2026); KBO Home Run Derby Champion (2025); 50 Homerun-150 RBI Club (2025); Korean Series champion (2026)

Lewin José Díaz (born November 19, 1996) is a Dominican professional baseball first baseman for the Samsung Lions of the KBO League. He has previously played in Major League Baseball (MLB) for the Miami Marlins.

== Career ==
=== Minnesota Twins ===
Díaz signed with the Minnesota Twins as an international free agent on November 21, 2013. He played for the DSL Twins in 2014, hitting .257/.385/.451 with 5 home runs and 27 RBI. He split the 2015 season between the GCL Twins and the Elizabethton Twins, hitting a combined .233/.322/.371 with 4 home runs and 20 RBI. He returned to Elizabethton in 2016, and hit .310/.353/.575 with 9 home runs and 37 RBI. He played for the Cedar Rapids Kernels in 2017, hitting .292/.329/.444 with 12 home runs and 68 RBI. He spent the 2018 season with the Fort Myers Miracle, hitting .224/.255/.344 with 6 home runs and 38 RBI. He opened the 2019 season back with Fort Myers, before being promoted to the Pensacola Blue Wahoos on June 19. Between the two teams, he hit a combined .294/.336/.553 with 19 home runs and 62 RBI.

=== Miami Marlins ===
On July 27, 2019, the Twins traded Díaz to the Miami Marlins in exchange for Sergio Romo, Chris Vallimont, and a player to be named later. He was assigned to the Jacksonville Jumbo Shrimp following the trade. Over 31 games with Jacksonville, he batted .200 with eight home runs. On November 20, 2019, the Marlins added Díaz to their 40-man roster to protect him from the Rule 5 draft.

On August 15, 2020, Díaz was promoted to the major leagues. He made his debut that day against the Atlanta Braves and got his first major league hit in his only at-bat against Mark Melancon. He finished his rookie campaign after playing in 14 games and hitting .154/.195/.205 with three RBI. In 2021, Díaz played in 40 games and batted .205/.242/.451 with 8 home runs and 13 RBI.

In 2022, Díaz played in a career–high 58 games for Miami, hitting .169/.224/.288 with 5 home runs and 11 RBI. On November 15, 2022, Díaz was designated for assignment by the Marlins.

=== Baltimore Orioles ===
On November 22, 2022, Díaz was claimed off waivers by the Pittsburgh Pirates. On November 30, he was designated for assignment after the signing of Carlos Santana was made official. On December 2, Díaz was claimed off waivers by the Baltimore Orioles. Following the signing of Mychal Givens, he was designated for assignment on December 21. On December 22, Díaz was traded to the Atlanta Braves in exchange for cash considerations. On December 28, the Braves designated Díaz for assignment.

On January 5, 2023, Díaz was again claimed off waivers by the Baltimore Orioles. He was again designated for assignment by the Orioles on January 11 after the team traded for Darwinzon Hernández. On January 17, Díaz cleared waivers and was assigned outright to the Triple-A Norfolk Tides. In 118 games for Norfolk, he batted .268/.362/.442 with 17 home runs and 64 RBI. Díaz elected free agency following the season on November 6.

=== Washington Nationals ===
On December 22, 2023, Díaz signed a minor league contract with the Washington Nationals that included an invitation to spring training. On March 26, 2024, Díaz was released by the Nationals organization.

=== Piratas de Campeche ===
On April 25, 2024, Díaz signed with the Piratas de Campeche of the Mexican League. In 51 games, he batted .361/.440/.606 with 12 home runs and 47 RBI.

=== Diablos Rojos del México ===
On July 1, 2024, Díaz was traded to the Diablos Rojos del México of the Mexican League in exchange for P Oscar Rojas. In 24 games, Díaz batted .405/.476/.730 with seven home runs and 30 RBI. On October 1, Diaz's Mexican League rights were traded back to the Piratas de Campeche.

=== Samsung Lions ===
On August 12, 2024, Díaz signed with the Samsung Lions of the KBO League. In 29 games for Samsung, he slashed .282/.331/.518 with seven home runs and 19 RBI.

On November 25, 2024, Díaz re–signed with Samsung on an $800,000 contract. He made 144 appearances for the Lions in 2025, batting .314/.381/.644 with 50 home runs and 158 RBI. At the culmination of the season, he was awarded with the KBO Batting Triple Crown (HR, RBI, and Slugging Percentage) and a Gold Glove. Díaz set the foreigner home run record, as well as becoming the single-season RBI record holder.

On November 25, 2025, Díaz re-signed with Samsung on a one-year, $1.5 million contract. He made 144 appearances for the Lions in 2026, batting .305/.384/.510 with 26 home runs and 129 RBI.

== Personal life ==
Díaz is married to Silenia Calicchio.

It was reported in late 2025 Díaz and his wife were targets of online harassment in Korea.
