= Félix Bautista (baseball) =

Dominican baseball player (born 1995)

Baltimore Orioles – No. 74
- Pitcher
- Born: June 20, 1995 (age 31); Santo Domingo, Dominican Republic
- Bats: Right Throws: Right

MLB debut
- April 10, 2022, for the Baltimore Orioles

MLB statistics (through 2026 season)
- Win–loss record: 13–7
- Earned run average: 2.15
- Strikeouts: 251
- Saves: 67
- Stats at Baseball Reference

Teams
- Baltimore Orioles (2022–2023, 2025–present)

Career highlights and awards
- All-Star (2023); All-MLB First Team (2023); AL Reliever of the Year (2023)

Félix Alexander Bautista (born June 20, 1995) is a Dominican professional baseball pitcher for the Baltimore Orioles of Major League Baseball (MLB). He signed with the Miami Marlins as an international free agent in 2012, and made his MLB debut in 2022 with the Orioles. Bautista was an All-Star and the American League Reliever of the Year in 2023. Nicknamed "The Mountain", he is one of the tallest and heaviest players in MLB, listed at 6 feet 8 inches (2.03 m) and 285 pounds (129 kg).

== Career ==
=== Miami Marlins ===
Bautista signed with the Miami Marlins as an international free agent on November 19, 2012. Bautista made his professional debut for the Dominican Summer League Marlins in 2013, logging a 2.73 earned run average (ERA) with 17 strikeouts in 11 appearances. In the summer of 2014 he contracted Chikungunya, a mosquito-borne virus, which kept him out of play for three weeks and left him weakened. On his return from the illness, Bautista pitched to a 12.41 ERA with seven strikeouts in 12 1/3 innings pitched across eight games. He was released by the Marlins organization on January 15, 2015.

=== Baltimore Orioles ===
After not playing professionally in 2015, on August 4, 2016, Bautista signed a minor league contract with the Baltimore Orioles organization. He was assigned to the Dominican Summer League Orioles, where he made five appearances to finish the year. Bautista returned to the DSL Orioles in 2017, posting a 4–3 record and 2.01 ERA with 75 strikeouts in 15 appearances (14 of them starts). He spent the 2018 season with the Gulf Coast League Orioles, pitching to a 4.33 ERA with 30 strikeouts in 27 innings of work across 12 appearances.

Bautista split the 2019 season between the Low-A Aberdeen IronBirds and the Single-A Delmarva Shorebirds, accumulating a 3.44 ERA with 48 strikeouts in 26 total appearances between the two affiliates. Bautista did not play in a game in 2020 due to the cancellation of the minor league season because of the COVID-19 pandemic. He spent the 2021 season with three different Orioles affiliates: High-A Aberdeen, the Double-A Bowie Baysox, and the Triple-A Norfolk Tides. In 40 appearances between the three levels, Bautista posted a stellar 1.54 ERA with 77 strikeouts in 46 2/3 innings pitched.

The Orioles added him to their 40-man roster following the 2021 season on November 19, 2021. Bautista made the Opening Day roster for the Orioles out of Spring Training in 2022. He made his major league debut on April 10, 2022, pitching in relief of Tyler Wells. In the game, he recorded his first major league strikeout against Tampa Bay Rays shortstop Wander Franco. On May 10, Bautista earned his first career save, closing out a 5–3 victory over the St. Louis Cardinals. When the Orioles traded Jorge López, Bautista succeeded him as the Orioles' closer.

Bautista was named the AL Reliever of the Month for April 2023 after going 7-for-7 in save chances, striking out 25 batters in 13.2 innings pitched, and posting a 46.4% whiff rate. On May 20, Bautista pitched the ninth and tenth innings of an extra-inning victory against the Toronto Blue Jays, recording a career-high five strikeouts in the appearance. On August 26, Bautista was placed on the injured list following a UCL injury that he suffered while pitching against the Colorado Rockies the previous day. On September 30, it was announced Bautista would undergo Tommy John surgery, which would force him to miss the entire 2024 season. In addition, on February 9, 2024, Bautista underwent a debridement and an ulnar nerve transposition in the same elbow that had Tommy John months before.

On March 29, 2025, Bautista made his return to the mound for the first time since August 25, 2023, striking out three while allowing one walk and one hit in the Orioles' 9–5 win over the Toronto Blue Jays. On April 12, Bautista recorded his first save of the season and his first save since August 24, 2023, to give the Orioles a 5–4 win over the Blue Jays. In 35 appearances for Baltimore, he logged a 1–1 record and 2.60 ERA with 50 strikeouts and 19 saves across 34 2/3 innings pitched. On July 24, Bautista was placed on the injured list due to right shoulder discomfort. On August 12, manager Tony Mansolino announced that Bautista had suffered a "significant shoulder injury" and would miss the remainder of the season. On August 20, it was announced that Bautista would be sidelined for the next 12 months after undergoing surgery to repair a torn rotator cuff and torn labrum in his right shoulder.

Bautista was activated off the injured list on September 19, 2026. He made his 2026 season debut the following day, throwing 19 pitches and allowing a run in the seventh inning against the Milwaukee Brewers.

== See also ==
- List of Major League Baseball players from the Dominican Republic
