= Connor Wong =

American baseball player (born 1996)

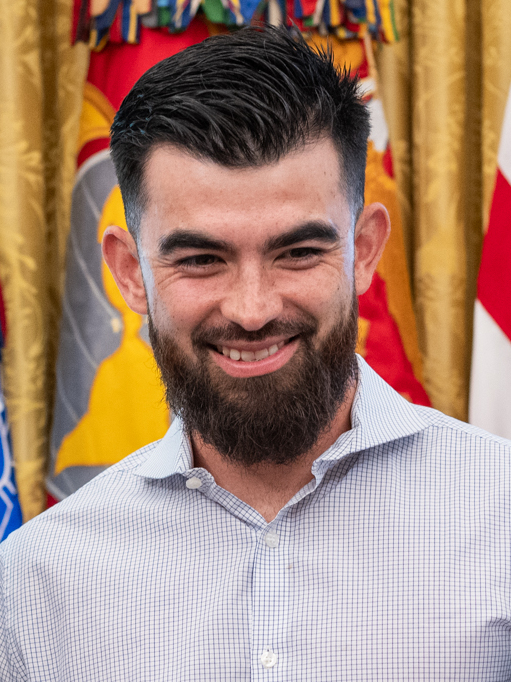
- Wong in 2025

Free agent
- Catcher / Infielder
- Born: May 19, 1996 (age 30); Houston, Texas, U.S.
- Bats: Right Throws: Right

MLB debut
- June 22, 2021, for the Boston Red Sox

MLB statistics (through 2026 season)
- Batting average: .243
- Home runs: 27
- Runs batted in: 128
- Stats at Baseball Reference

Teams
- Boston Red Sox (2021–2026)

Connor Sun-Han Wong (born May 19, 1996) is an American professional baseball catcher and infielder who is a free agent. He has previously played in Major League Baseball (MLB) for the Boston Red Sox. He is 5 feet 10 inches (1.78 m) and 181 pounds (82 kg), he bats and throws right-handed. He made his MLB debut in June 2021, prior to which he played every position except pitcher in the minor leagues.

== Amateur career ==
Wong attended Pearland High School in Pearland, Texas, where he played baseball. In his senior year of 2014, he earned all-state honors as a shortstop. After not being selected in the 2014 MLB draft, he enrolled at the University of Houston where he played college baseball for the Cougars.

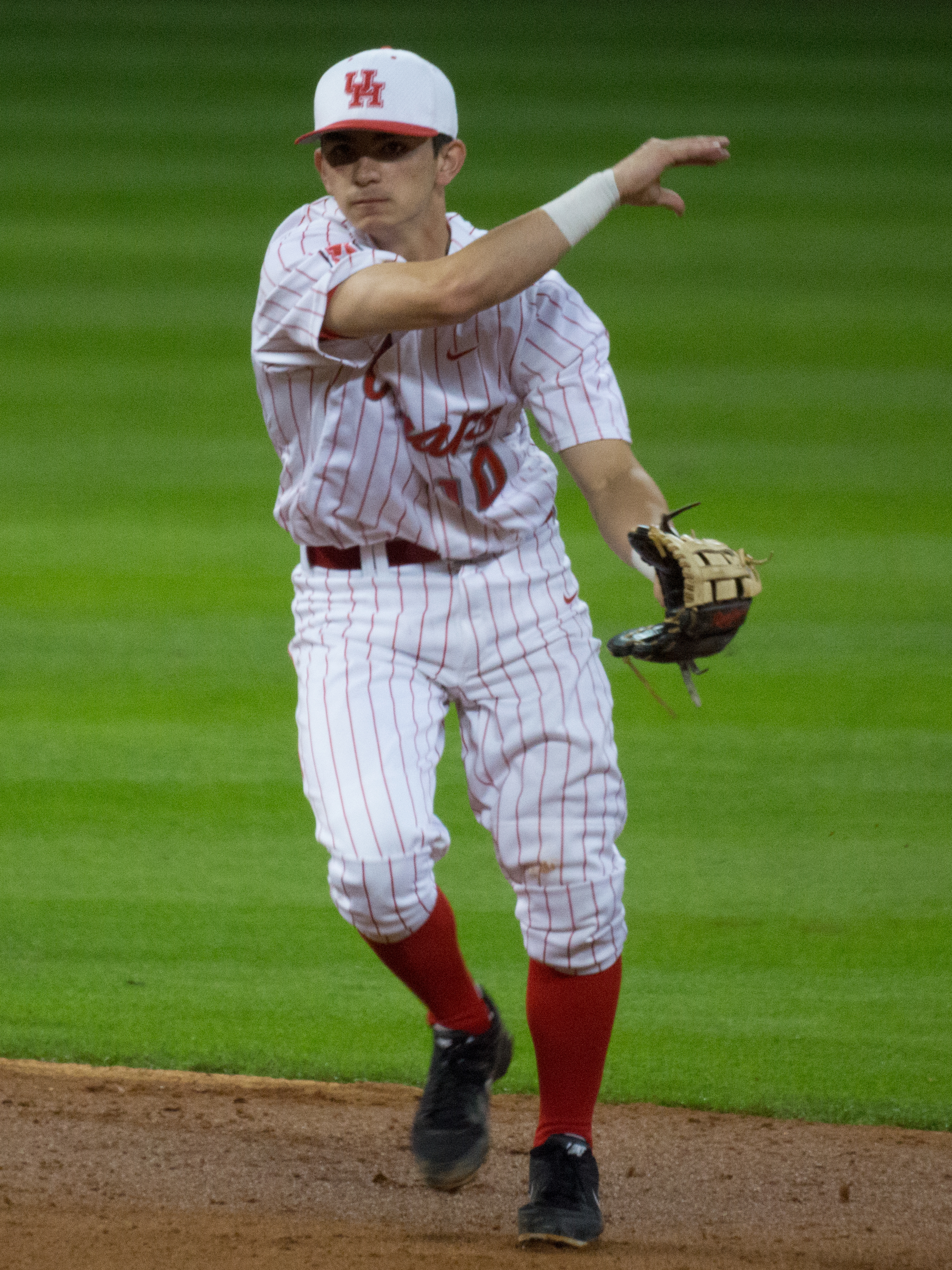
Wong playing for Houston in 2015

In 2015, Wong's freshman season at Houston, he started 62 of Houston's 63 games at shortstop, hitting .248 with six home runs and 37 runs batted in (RBIs). That summer, he played in the Cape Cod Baseball League with the Yarmouth–Dennis Red Sox. As a sophomore in 2016, he started all 59 games and saw time at catcher, third base, and the outfield; for the season, Wong had a slash line of .304/.415/.435 with five home runs and 30 RBIs, earning all-conference first-team honors in the American Athletic Conference. He returned to the Cape Cod League that summer, playing 41 games with the Bourne Braves, batting .313 with three home runs and earning all-star honors. In 2017, Wong's junior year at Houston, he began catching full-time. For the season, he started all 63 of Houston's games, slashing .287/.379/.494 with 12 home runs, 36 RBIs, and 26 stolen bases. After the season, he was selected by the Los Angeles Dodgers in the third round of the 2017 MLB draft.

== Professional career ==
=== Los Angeles Dodgers ===
Wong signed with the Dodgers and made his professional debut with the rookie-level Arizona League Dodgers before being promoted to the Great Lakes Loons of the Single–A Midwest League after one game; over 28 games for the season, Wong hit .276 with five home runs and 18 RBI. In 2018, Wong played for the Rancho Cucamonga Quakes of the High–A California League (with whom he earned all-star honors), slashing .269/.350/.480 with 19 home runs and 60 RBI over 102 games. Wong returned to the Quakes to begin 2019, earning all-star honors for the second straight year, before being promoted to the Tulsa Drillers of the Double-A Texas League in July. Over 111 games between the two affiliates, he slashed .281/.336/.541 with 24 home runs, 82 RBI, and 11 stolen bases.

=== Boston Red Sox ===
On February 10, 2020, Wong was traded to the Boston Red Sox along with Jeter Downs and Alex Verdugo in exchange for Mookie Betts, David Price and cash considerations. After the 2020 minor league season was cancelled due to the COVID-19 pandemic, Wong was invited to participate in the Red Sox' fall instructional league. On November 20, 2020, he was added to the 40-man roster.

To begin the 2021 season, Wong was assigned to the Triple-A Worcester Red Sox. On June 22, he was promoted to the major leagues for the first time and made his major-league debut against the Tampa Bay Rays as a pinch runner in extra innings. He recorded his first MLB hit on June 26, a single against Jordan Montgomery of the New York Yankees. Wong was optioned back to Worcester and recalled to Boston several times from July to September. Wong played in a total of six games for Boston, batting 4-for-13 (.308) with one RBI. He also made 50 appearances for Worcester, batting .256 with eight home runs and 26 RBIs. After the regular season, Wong was selected to play in the Arizona Fall League.

Wong began the 2022 season in Triple-A; he was called up to Boston on April 18 when Kevin Plawecki was placed on the COVID-related list. The next evening, Wong hit a sacrifice fly to drive in the winning run in a 2–1 victory over the Toronto Blue Jays. Wong was optioned back to Worcester on April 25, when Plawecki returned to the team. Wong later spent parts of July with Boston. He sustained a hand injury on July 29 when he was hit by a pitch in a Triple-A contest, causing him to miss multiple games. On September 1, when MLB active rosters expanded from 26 to 28 players, Wong was recalled to Boston. On September 2, he hit his first major-league home run, coming against Texas Rangers pitcher A. J. Alexy at Fenway Park. Wong made 27 appearances for Boston during the season, batting .188 with one home run and seven RBIs. He also played 81 games for Triple-A Worcester, batting .288 with 15 home runs and 44 RBIs.

In 2023 Wong served as the primary catcher for the Red Sox. In 126 games he hit .235 with nine home runs and eight stolen bases.

Wong made 63 appearances for Boston during the 2025 campaign, slashing .190/.262/.238 with seven RBI and two stolen bases. On October 9, 2025, it was announced that Wong had undergone surgery for a right hand carpal boss excision.

On November 18, 2026, Wong was designated for assignment by Boston following the acquisition of Nick Fortes. Two days later, he was non-tendered and became a free agent.

== Personal life ==
Wong is Chinese-American. His father is a construction engineer and his mother is a teacher. He is the stepson of former Montreal Expos and Milwaukee Brewers pitcher Matt Maysey.

Wong is married to Danielle Adair Wong, with whom he has a son.
