= Mookie Betts =

American baseball player (born 1992)

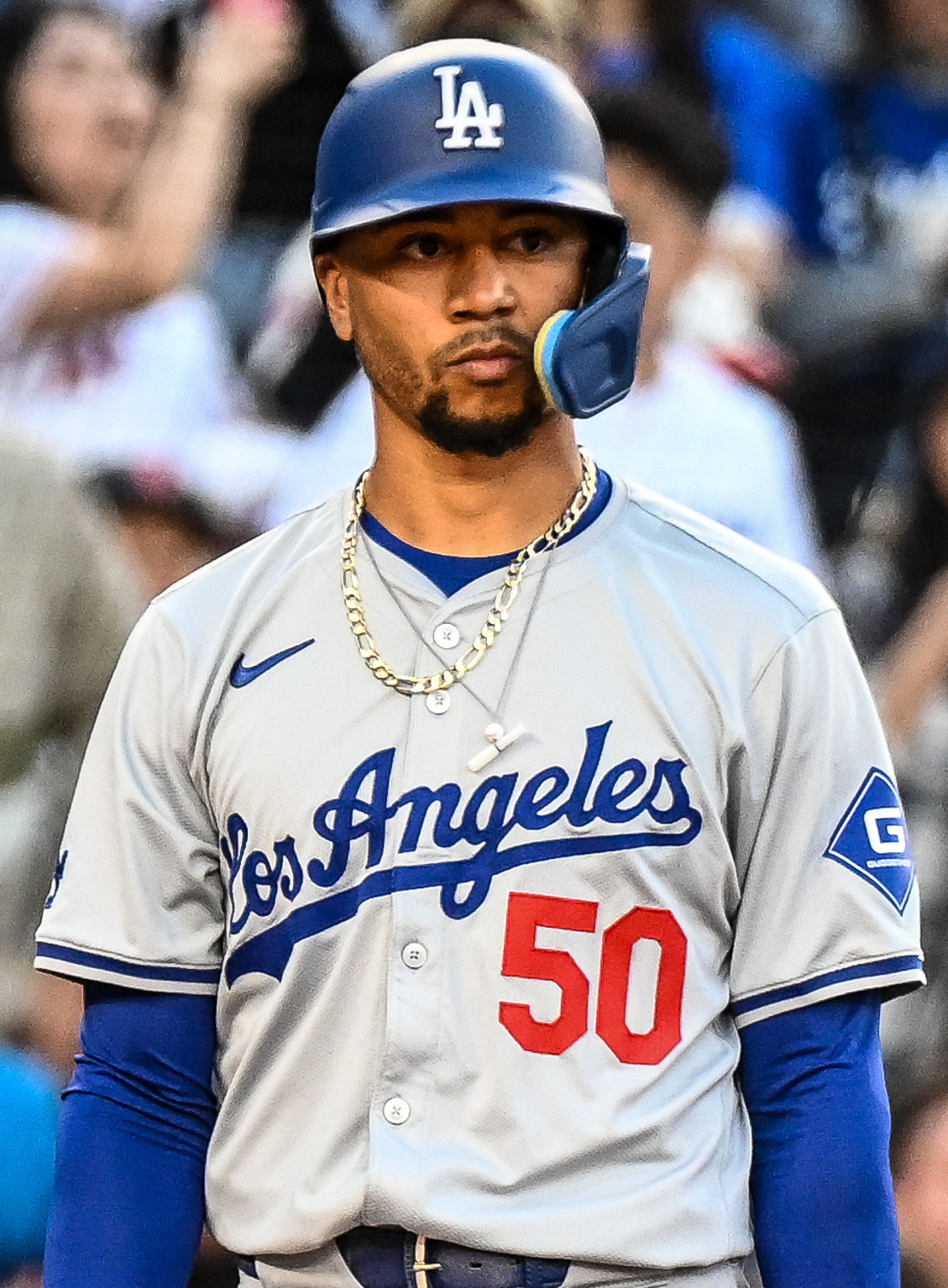
- Betts with the Los Angeles Dodgers in 2024

Los Angeles Dodgers – No. 50
- Outfielder / Shortstop / Second baseman
- Born: October 7, 1992 (age 34); Nashville, Tennessee, U.S.
- Bats: Right Throws: Right

MLB debut
- June 29, 2014, for the Boston Red Sox

MLB statistics (through 2026 season)
- Batting average: .288
- Hits: 1,890
- Home runs: 314
- Runs batted in: 982
- Stolen bases: 198
- Stats at Baseball Reference

Teams
- Boston Red Sox (2014–2019); Los Angeles Dodgers (2020–present)

Career highlights and awards
- 8× All-Star (2016–2019, 2021–2024); 4× World Series champion (2018, 2020, 2024, 2025); AL MVP (2018); 4× All-MLB First Team (2020, 2022–2024); 6× Gold Glove Award (2016–2020, 2022); 7× Silver Slugger Award (2016, 2018–2020, 2022–2024); Roberto Clemente Award (2025); AL batting champion (2018)
Medals
Men's baseball
Representing United States
World Baseball Classic
Silver medal – second place	2023 Miami	Team

Markus Lynn "Mookie" Betts (born October 7, 1992) is an American professional baseball outfielder, shortstop, and second baseman for the Los Angeles Dodgers of Major League Baseball (MLB). He debuted in MLB for the Boston Red Sox. Betts is an eight-time All-Star, seven-time Silver Slugger Award winner, six-time Gold Glove Award recipient, four-time World Series champion, and was named the Most Valuable Player in the American League in 2018. He is among the top three active players in Wins Above Replacement (WAR). Internationally, Betts represents the United States.

Betts was drafted by the Red Sox in 2011 and made his MLB debut in the 2014 season, splitting time between second base and the outfield. He became the Red Sox center fielder in 2014, before moving to right field in 2016. In 2020, after six seasons with Boston, he was traded to the Dodgers and signed a 12-year, $365 million extension with the team through the 2032 season.

As a relatively short second baseman with a high contact rate and a high level of production when pulling the ball, Betts has been compared to former Red Sox teammate Dustin Pedroia. In 2018, (Note: The Silver Slugger was first awarded in 1980.) Betts became the first player to win the Most Valuable Player, Silver Slugger, Gold Glove, batting title, and World Series in the same season. He has won the 2020, 2024, and 2025 World Series with Los Angeles. Betts is widely regarded as one of the greatest players of his generation.

Outside of baseball, Betts is also a professional ten-pin bowler for the Professional Bowlers Association (PBA). He bowled a perfect game in the World Series of Bowling in 2017.

== Early life ==
Markus Lynn "Mookie" Betts was born on October 7, 1992, in Nashville. His parents chose his name in part forming the initials MLB, matching those of Major League Baseball. He has attributed his nickname Mookie to his parents watching former NBA guard Mookie Blaylock play basketball shortly after Betts was born. Betts has said that he has never met Blaylock. When Little League Baseball coaches refused to accept Betts because of his small size, his mother started her own team so that her son could play.

In 2010, his junior year at John Overton High School, Betts batted .548 with 24 steals. In November of that year, Betts committed to the University of Tennessee on a baseball scholarship after also getting recruited by Vanderbilt University, Mississippi State University, and the University of Alabama at Birmingham.

At Overton, Betts was also a standout basketball player, named MVP of the District 12-AAA league his senior season while averaging 14.1 points, nine assists, four rebounds, and three steals per game; he was named Class AAA All-City Player of the Year for the Nashville metropolitan area. His junior year, Betts was named MVP of the District 12-AAA tournament. Betts also excelled in bowling, named the Tennessee Boys Bowler of the Year in 2010 with a high score of 290. He grew up bowling at the Donelson Strike and Spare in Donelson, Tennessee.

== Professional career ==
=== Boston Red Sox ===
==== 2011–2013: Draft and minor leagues ====
The Boston Red Sox selected Betts in the fifth round of the 2011 Major League Baseball draft with the 172nd overall pick as a second baseman. After protracted negotiations, he signed with the Red Sox, forgoing his commitment to the University of Tennessee, for a $750,000 signing bonus that exceed the slot value of his draft pick. Betts played one game in 2011 for the GCL Red Sox of the rookie Gulf Coast League, getting two hits in four at bats. In 2012, he batted .267 and stole 20 bases in 71 games for the short season Lowell Spinners of the New York–Penn League. He played shortstop regularly, but looked more comfortable at second base.

Betts started the 2013 season with the Greenville Drive of the Low A South Atlantic League. In 76 games, Betts batted .296, with a 19-game hitting streak, and was selected to the South Atlantic League All-Star Game.

On July 9, Betts was promoted to the Salem Red Sox of the High A Carolina League, batting .341 in 51 games to complete the 2013 season, with a combined .314 average in 127 games between Greenville and Salem, with 15 home runs and 38 steals. He was named Offensive Player of the Year and Breakout Player of the Year in the Boston minor league system, leading all Sox minors players with a .506 slugging percentage, while his .314 batting average ranked him third behind Alex Hassan (.338) and Garin Cecchini (.322). Betts was a second-team inclusion on the Baseball America Minor League All-Star Team for 2013, with the first-team selection for second base going to Marcus Semien, an infielder for the Chicago White Sox. Betts subsequently played 16 games for the Surprise Saguaros of the Arizona Fall League, batting .271.

==== 2014 season: MLB rookie season ====
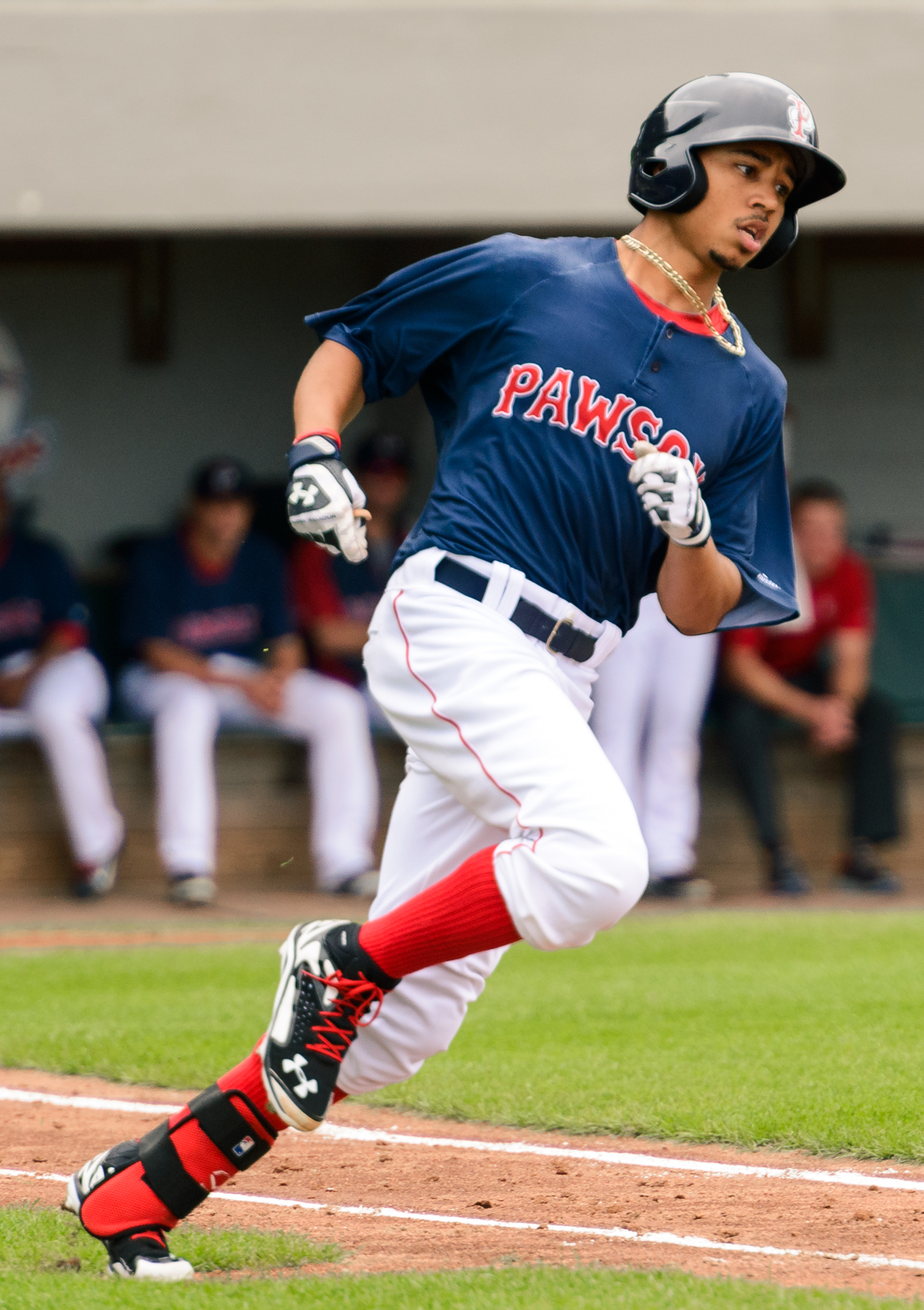
Betts playing for the Pawtucket Red Sox in 2014

Betts opened the 2014 season with the Portland Sea Dogs of the Double-A Eastern League, batting .355 in 54 games to lead the Eastern League through June 2. On June 3, Betts was promoted to the Pawtucket Red Sox of the Triple-A International League, batting .322 and reaching base in all 23 games with the PawSox.

In 2013 and 2014, Betts reached base in 66 straight regular-season games plus five playoff games for a combined streak of 71 games. Because official baseball streak records do not include playoff games, Betts' streak has been listed at 66 games; Kevin Millar and Kevin Youkilis hold the official minor league record for consecutive games reaching base, at 71 games, with Minor League Baseball lacking data on the statistic before 1997.

In mid-May, Betts began playing the outfield in addition to second base. In 2013, four-time All-Star second baseman Dustin Pedroia signed an eight-year, $110 million contract extension with the Red Sox, leading to speculation that the Red Sox would move Betts to a new position.

Betts was promoted to the Red Sox on June 28. He had previously been selected for the All-Star Futures Game, but was replaced following his promotion to the major leagues. Betts made his debut on June 29, recording his first major league career hit against Yankees starter Chase Whitley in the fourth inning. He hit his first home run on July 2 off the Chicago Cubs' Carlos Villanueva. He then was optioned to Triple-A Pawtucket on July 19, when Shane Victorino was activated from the disabled list, and was recalled to Boston on August 1. Betts was optioned back to Pawtucket in August and recalled again on August 18.

On August 29, Betts hit his first career grand slam against Rays pitcher Chris Archer at Tropicana Field. At age 21, Betts became the youngest Sox player to hit a grand slam in 49 years. Betts spent most of the 2014 season playing in the outfield, but on September 11, manager John Farrell announced that Betts would play second base "fairly regularly" following injuries to regular second basemen Dustin Pedroia and Brock Holt.

Betts split the 2014 season fairly evenly among Double-A, Triple-A, and MLB, playing 52 major league games. He performed well for the Red Sox, hitting .291 with five home runs. He played over half his innings in center field.

==== 2015 season: Shift to right field ====
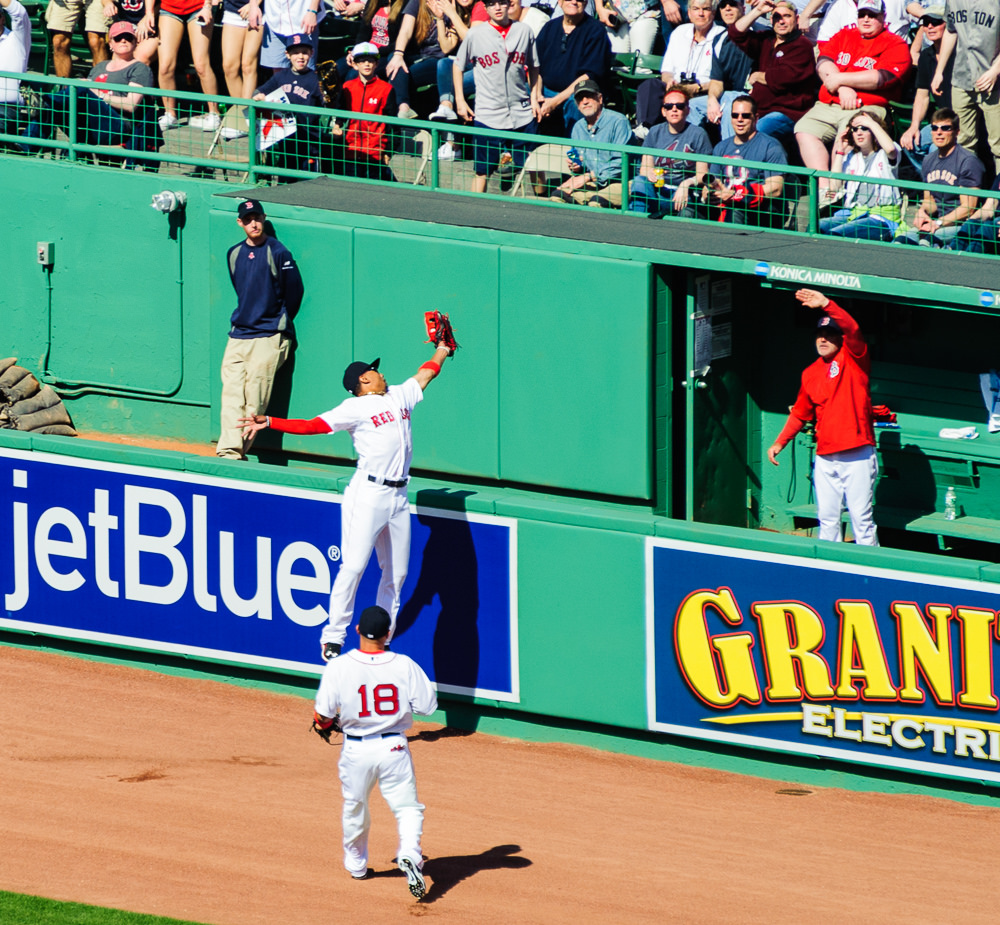
Betts makes a leaping catch to deprive Bryce Harper (off-field) of a home run on April 13, 2015.

On April 6, 2015, Opening Day for the Red Sox against the Philadelphia Phillies, Betts hit a home run in his second at-bat, becoming the third youngest player to hit a home run on Opening Day for the Red Sox. On April 13, in the home opener at Fenway Park against the Washington Nationals, Betts arguably had the most exciting performance of his career. He robbed Bryce Harper of a home run, stole two bases on one play, and hit a home run into the Green Monster seats, all in the first three innings.

Betts was named the American League (AL) Player of the Week for the week ending on June 21. Within that week, Betts batted .581 (18-for-31) with two home runs, two triples, three doubles, seven RBI and eight runs. He led the AL in batting average, hits, on-base percentage (.594), total bases (31), and slugging percentage (1.000) that week. In the latter part of the season, he spent some time in right field, leading to speculation that he would move there permanently to allow teammate Jackie Bradley Jr. to take over in center field. Betts ended the 2015 season with a .291 batting average, with 92 runs scored, 77 RBIs, 18 home runs and 21 stolen bases.

==== 2016 season: First All-Star appearance ====
Betts prior to a ALDS Game 3 at Fenway Park in October 2016

Betts was selected to the 2016 MLB All-Star Game, the first of his career. He started in right field and was 1-for-2 with a single, and a RBI. Betts was named the AL Player of the Month for July, when he batted .368 with five home runs, 15 RBIs, five stolen bases and a 1.068 OPS in 23 games. On September 20, Betts became the first player to reach 200 hits during the 2016 MLB season. In 158 games played, Betts finished the season with a .318 batting average, 214 hits, 122 runs scored, 42 doubles, 31 home runs, 113 RBI, and an MLB-leading 359 total bases. His 67 multi-hit games also led MLB. He also was second in the league in power–speed number (28.3).

With the Red Sox finishing the season 93–69, the team clinched the AL East Division but succumbed to a three-game sweep by the Cleveland Indians in the American League Division Series (ALDS). Wilson Sporting Goods named Betts its Defensive Player of the Year at right field and best overall among all major league fielders. After the season, Betts was named a finalist for the AL MVP Award, alongside Mike Trout and Jose Altuve. He finished second in voting behind Trout.

In November, Betts underwent right knee surgery.

==== 2017 season: Second All-Star appearance ====
Prior to the 2017 season, Betts and the Red Sox were unable to come to terms on a contract. The Red Sox renewed Betts' contract with a salary of $950,000, up from $566,000 in 2016 and the second-highest pre-arbitration salary in MLB history.

From September 12, 2016, through to April 19, 2017, Betts went 129 consecutive plate appearances without striking out. His streak ended against Francisco Liriano of the Toronto Blue Jays. On July 2, he tied an MLB record with eight RBIs from the leadoff slot in a 15–1 rout of the Blue Jays on July 2. He was selected to his second All-Star Game the same day. Originally chosen as a reserve, it was announced on July 3 that Betts would start in place of Mike Trout, who was out due to surgery on his thumb.

Betts ended the season with a .264 batting average, 101 runs scored, 26 stolen bases, 24 home runs, and 102 RBIs. Betts led the Red Sox in each of those categories except batting average, as he batted just .236 from the All-Star break through September 4. Despite his solid stats on the season, Betts struggled to turn balls in play into hits. His batting average on balls in play fell 54 points from its 2016 level to .268. He also was third in the league in power–speed number (25). He won his second consecutive Gold Glove Award.

==== 2018 season: AL MVP and first World Series championship ====
Eligible for salary arbitration for the first time in 2018, Betts filed for a $10.5 million salary while the Red Sox countered with $7.5 million. A three-person arbitration panel sided with Betts, giving him the $10.5 million salary for 2018. Betts reportedly turned down an eight-year, $200 million contract extension offer.

On April 17, 2018, Nick Cafardo of The Boston Globe published a column titled, "Mookie Betts or Mike Trout: Who gets the nod?" comparing Betts to Trout, a then-two-time MVP widely considered the best player in baseball. Of the 10 professional evaluators Cafardo asked, seven chose Trout and three chose Betts. "To be in the same conversation as a great player like that is an honor," Betts said. That same night, Betts hit three home runs to lead the Red Sox to a 10–1 win over Trout's Los Angeles Angels. It was the third three-homer game of his career, tying him with Ted Williams for the most in Red Sox history. Betts broke the tie with Williams and set the franchise record on May 2, hitting three home runs in a 5–4 win over the Kansas City Royals. He became the first player in MLB history to produce four three-homer games before the age of 26.

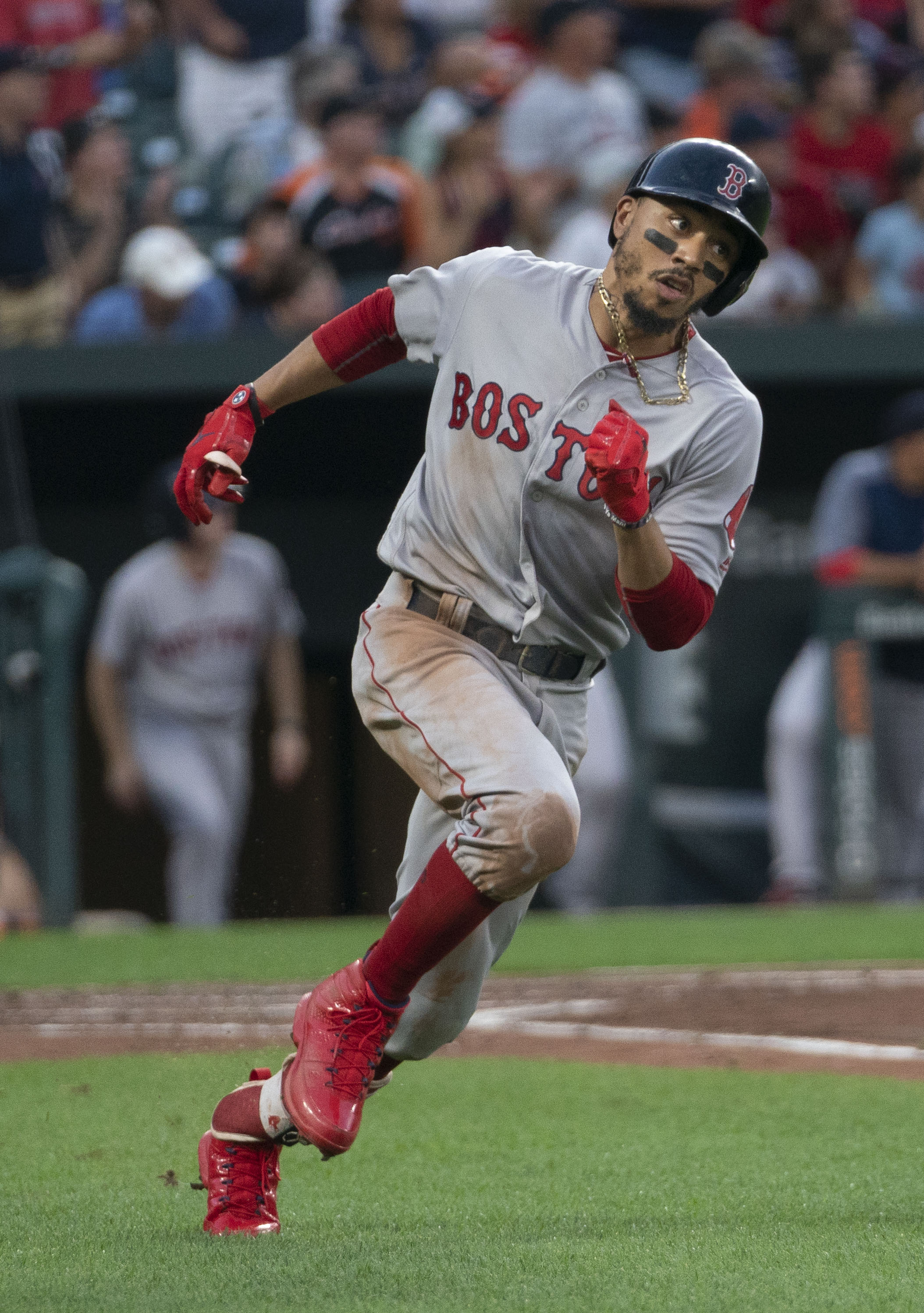
Betts with the Red Sox in August 2018

By May 20, Betts had amassed a major league-leading 15 home runs. He led MLB in batting average, slugging percentage, OPS, total bases, extra-base hits, doubles, runs scored, runs created, and OPS+. He credited hitting coaches Tim Hyers and Andy Barkett as well as teammate J. D. Martinez for his improvement. He 4.3 WAR at the end of May, as calculated by FanGraphs, led the majors. On June 1, Betts was placed on the 10-day disabled list, retroactive to May 29, with a left abdominal strain. He returned to the active roster on June 11. On July 6, Betts hit his 100th career MLB home run. He became the fourth Red Sox player to hit 100 home runs before turning 26, the others being Tony Conigliaro, Jim Rice, and Ted Williams. On July 8, while batting .343 with 22 home runs and 44 RBIs, Betts was named to the All-Star Game as an AL starting outfielder. On August 9, he hit for the cycle, becoming the 21st player in Red Sox franchise history to accomplish the feat. On September 26, Betts stole his 30th base of the season, becoming just the second player in Red Sox history to join the 30–30 club (the first was Jacoby Ellsbury in 2011).

Betts finished the season leading the major leagues with a .346 batting average, a .640 slugging percentage, and 129 runs scored. For the season, he had the highest batting average on balls in play (.373) of all major league players. He also was second in the league in power–speed number (31). He had the highest fielding percentage among major league right fielders, at .996. The Red Sox finished the year at 108–54 and went on to win the World Series over the Los Angeles Dodgers. In the postseason, Betts hit 13-for-62 (.210) with one home run and four RBIs. During the Game 4 of the ALCS, Betts made a leaping attempt to catch a would-be home run by Jose Altuve of the Houston Astros, and Altuve was ruled out due to fan interference.

Betts won his third consecutive Gold Glove, the Heart & Hustle Award, and the AL MVP Award, receiving 28 of 30 first place votes, making him the only player in MLB history to win the World Series, a Gold Glove, a Silver Slugger Award, batting title, and MVP in the same season.

==== 2019 season: Final season in Boston ====
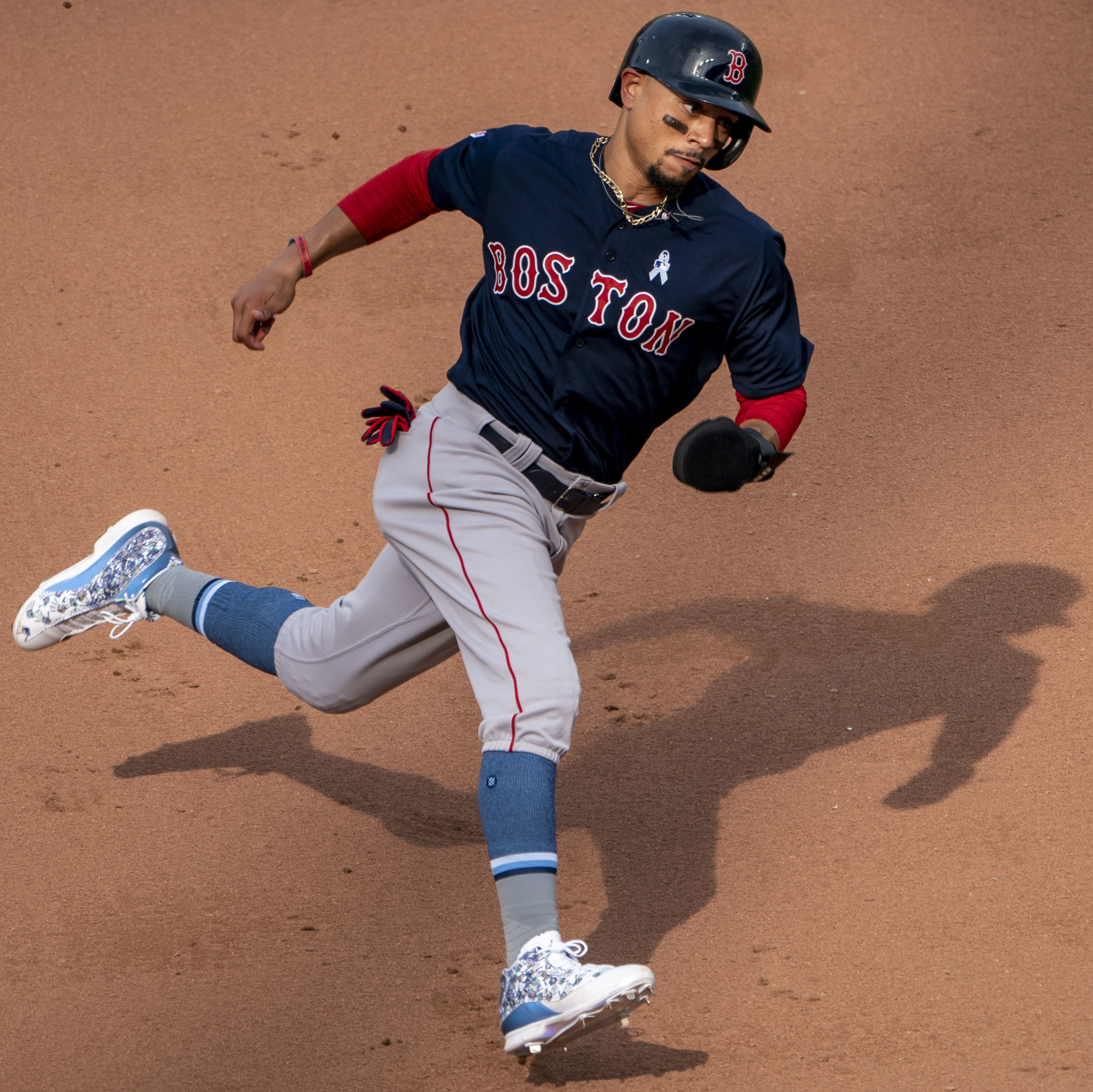
Betts in 2019

Betts and the Red Sox agreed on a $20 million salary for the 2019 season, avoiding arbitration. Before the season, manager Alex Cora stated he would use Andrew Benintendi as the team's leadoff hitter, with Betts batting second, swapping their positions from the team's usual 2018 batting order. At the beginning of June, Cora announced that Betts would again be the team's leadoff hitter since Benintendi went just 3-for-37 in the leadoff spot. At the end of June, Betts had a .261 average with 13 home runs and 37 RBIs. He was selected as a reserve outfielder to the All-Star Game. On July 26, Betts had the fifth three-homer game of his career, hitting a home run in each of his first three at bats against James Paxton of the Yankees.

For the season, Betts appeared in 150 games, batting .295 with a .915 OPS, 135 runs scored (leading the major leagues), 29 home runs, 80 RBIs, 40 doubles, and 16 stolen bases in 597 at-bats. Defensively, he led major league right fielders with 15 Defensive Runs Saved (DRS) and a .996 fielding percentage. Betts won his fourth consecutive Gold Glove and his third Silver Slugger. He finished eighth in AL MVP voting. Betts and the Red Sox agreed to a $27 million salary in January 2020.

=== Los Angeles Dodgers (2020–present) ===
==== 2020 season: Trade, extension, and second World Series win ====
On February 10, 2020, the Red Sox traded Betts, David Price, and $48 million to the Los Angeles Dodgers in exchange for Alex Verdugo, Connor Wong and Jeter Downs. On July 22, the Dodgers signed Betts to a 12-year contract extension, through the 2032 season. The deal was worth $365 million and also included a $65 million signing bonus, making it the richest contract in Dodgers history, and the third-richest contract in the history of North American sports.

The 2020 season was delayed and shortened from 162 games to 60 due to the COVID-19 pandemic. On July 23, Betts was the starting right fielder, making his Dodgers debut on Opening Day against the San Francisco Giants, getting his first hit, a single, as a Dodger against reliever Tyler Rogers. On July 31, Betts hit his first home run as a Dodger against Arizona Diamondback starter Zac Gallen. On August 13, Betts hit three home runs against the San Diego Padres, his sixth career three-homer game, tying Sammy Sosa and Johnny Mize as the only players in MLB history to accomplish this feat. Later that month, Betts hit two home runs and stole two bases against the Colorado Rockies, becoming only the 19th player (and first Dodger) to have a multi-homer, multi-steal game. On August 27, he reached 1,000 MLB career hits.

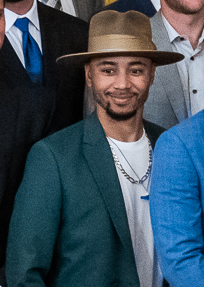
Betts at the White House in 2021 with the 2020 World Series championship Dodgers team

Betts finished the season hitting .292/.366/.562 with 47 runs (fourth in the NL), 16 home runs (third), 39 RBIs, a .928 OPS, and 10 stolen bases. On his way to his second World Series title in three years, Betts made three straight series-saving defensive gems in elimination games for the Dodgers in the National League Championship Series (NLCS) against the Atlanta Braves. In the World Series clincher, Betts scored twice and hit a home run. Betts also homered in Game 5 of the 2018 World Series, when the Red Sox went on to clinch. He became the ninth player to homer in multiple World Series-clinching games, and just the second to do it with different teams, following Reggie Jackson. His eight doubles in the postseason tied a major league record for most doubles in one postseason.

Betts won his fifth consecutive Gold Glove and his fourth Silver Slugger, both his first such National League (NL) awards. He finished second in NL MVP voting behind Atlanta's Freddie Freeman.

==== 2021 season: Fifth All-Star appearance ====
Betts was selected to the NL All-Star Team, his first appearance with the Dodgers. He did not play in the game due to injury, dealing with back and left shoulder. He played in 122 games for the Dodgers, with a .264 batting average, 23 home runs, and 58 RBI. In the postseason, he had two hits in four at-bats in the Wild Card Game, nine hits in 20 at-bats (.450) with one home run in the NL Division Series (NLCS), but slumped in the NLCS, batting 4-for-23 with one double and four stolen bases as Los Angeles lost to Atlanta.

==== 2022 season: Sixth All-Star appearance ====
In mid-June, Betts cracked his rib and went on the ten-day injured list. He was selected as a starting outfielder for the NL All-Star Team, his sixth appearance at the All-Star Game, which was played at Dodger Stadium. On July 23, Betts hit his 200th career home run off of Alex Wood of the San Francisco Giants.

Betts played in 142 games for the Dodgers in 2022, batting .269 with 35 home runs and 82 RBIs. He was tied for the league lead with 117 runs scored. He finished fifth in NL MVP voting and won his fifth Silver Slugger Award. In his third consecutive postseason with the Dodgers, his poor hitting continued, batting 2-for-14 in a four-game NLDS loss to the San Diego Padres.

==== 2023 season: Return to infield, seventh All-Star appearance ====
Betts with the Dodgers in 2023

In 2023, as a result of injuries and under performance among the Dodgers infielders, Betts showed his versatility by playing significant time at second base and also made his first career appearance at shortstop, on April 21 against the Chicago Cubs.

Betts was again elected by the fans as a starter in the outfield at the All-Star Game. Betts played in 107 games in the outfield, 70 games at second base, and 16 games at shortstop. He had a .307 batting average with a career high 39 home runs and 107 RBI. He won his sixth Silver Slugger. For the third consecutive series, Betts struggled in the postseason, batting 0-for-11 with one walk as the Arizona Diamondbacks swept the Dodgers in the NLDS.

==== 2024 season: Position switches, third World Series championship ====
Betts at shortstop with the Dodgers in 2024

Heading into spring training in 2024, the Dodgers planned for Betts to be a full-time second baseman, as the team had more outfielders that they wanted to get playing time. However, due to Gavin Lux's poor defense at shortstop in Cactus League games, on March 8, manager Dave Roberts announced that Betts would instead be the Dodgers starting shortstop. On June 16, Betts was hit in the left hand by a 97.9 mph fastball thrown by Kansas City Royals pitcher Dan Altavilla, fracturing it and necessitating a lengthy stay on the injured list. He returned from the injured list on August 12, with the Dodgers announcing that Betts would return to right field for the rest of the season. He played in 116 games, batting .289 with 19 homers and 75 RBI. He hit the lowest percentage of ground balls in MLB, at 27.0%.

Betts batted .222 in the NLDS, but hit home runs in consecutive games on the road against the San Diego Padres after Jurickson Profar robbed a Betts homer in Game 2. In the NLCS against the New York Mets, Betts had two home runs, nine RBI, and batted. 346. He then batted .278 in the World Series win over the New York Yankees. In Game 4 at Yankee Stadium, two fans interfered with Betts catching a fly ball in foul territory near the outfield wall, ripping the ball out of Betts' glove. Batter Gleyber Torres was ruled out, and both fans were ejected from the game. The following night, Betts was involved in several key plays in the deciding Game 5, beating out an infield hit to drive in a run and set up the Dodgers big comeback in the fifth inning and then in the eighth inning driving in the eventual winning run on a sacrifice fly. It was Betts' third World Series championship. He won his seventh Silver Slugger award, though this was the first time that it was as a utility player rather than outfielder.

==== 2025: Full-time shortstop, offensive slump, and fourth championship ====
The Dodgers and Betts decided that he would exclusively play shortstop for the 2025 season. While he performed well defensively at the position, his offense remained in a slump for the majority of the season, something that frustrated him and he blamed on his hand injury from the previous season. He also missed the start of the season after losing almost 15 pounds in March due to an illness. His performance improved in the last couple of months of the season and he started to resemble his normal self. Betts played in 150 games in 2025 (remaining at short stop all season), and slashed .258/.326/.406 while hitting 20 home runs and driving in 82 RBI.

For his defensive work at shortstop in 2025, Betts won a Fielding Bible and was a finalist for the Gold Glove at the position, losing to Masyn Winn of the St. Louis Cardinals. Off the field for his charity work, he won the Roberto Clemente Award.

In the postseason, Betts had six hits, with three doubles in nine at-bats during the Wild Card Series, four hits, including a triple, in 17 at-bats, in the NLDS, and two hits, one a double, in 15 at-bats in the NLCS. In the World Series, he had four hits in 29 at-bats. After being moved down in the lineup by Roberts, Betts had a key, two-RBI single in Game 6, which was the winning margin. In Game 7, Betts started the game- and series-ending double play. The Dodgers defeated the Blue Jays in seven games to repeat as champions, Betts' fourth World Series championship. He joined Gene Tenace, Mike Timlin, and Javier López as the only four-time champions who never played for the Yankees.

==== 2026 ====
Betts was placed on the injured list on April 5 due to a right oblique strain and was not activated until May 11. A first half slump led to him being dropped down in the batting order and questions about if he was beginning to decline However, his performance improved as the season went on and his final season numbers saw him hit .257/.326/.454 with 23 home runs and 69 RBI in 123 games. Additionally, on June 24, he hit his 300th career home run in a game against the Minnesota Twins.

== International career ==
Betts played for the U.S. national team in the 2023 World Baseball Classic (WBC). He hit .313 in the tournament with 1 RBI. He was the penultimate batter in the tournament, grounding into a double play against future teammate Shohei Ohtani in the 9th inning of the championship game loss to Japan. Months later, he called the WBC "the best baseball experience".

== Personal life ==
Betts with his family at the 2019 MLB All-Star Red Carpet Parade

Betts' first cousin, once removed is Terry Shumpert, who played parts of 14 seasons with several MLB teams. Shumpert is a cousin of Betts' mother. (Note: The relationship has been incorrectly reported as Shumpert being Betts' uncle.) In 2004, Shumpert spent his final season of professional baseball with the Triple-A Nashville Sounds and worked extensively with Betts.

Betts and his wife began dating in middle school. The couple welcomed their first child in November 2018. They announced their engagement in January 2021 and married on December 1, 2021, in Rancho Palos Verdes, California. Their second child was born in 2023. Betts' wife is the president of his charitable organization, the 5050 Foundation. They have a home in Franklin, Tennessee. Betts purchased a mansion for $7.6 million in Encino, Los Angeles in November 2020, after joining the Dodgers. Football coach Chip Kelly previously owned the mansion. He bought a different Encino mansion in 2023.

While with the Red Sox, Betts became known for his necklaces. One was a gift from a 13-year-old fan, given to Betts during spring training in 2018. He continued wearing the necklace after being traded to the Los Angeles Dodgers.

In 2021, Betts said that he had "made the switch over to vegan" but by 2023 confirmed that he is no longer vegan.

=== Media production ===
Betts hosts a baseball podcast called On Base, published by Bleacher Report.

In January 2022, Betts signed a movie production agreement with Propagate Content.

Betts participated in the production of a film focused on the life of Jackie Robinson. The film, Jackie Robinson: Get to the Bag, was shown in a preview event at a New York museum in August 2022.

== See also ==
- List of Boston Red Sox award winners
- List of Boston Red Sox team records
- Los Angeles Dodgers award winners and league leaders
- List of largest sports contracts
- List of Major League Baseball annual runs scored leaders
- List of Major League Baseball batting champions
- List of Major League Baseball career games played as a right fielder leaders
- List of Major League Baseball career home run leaders
- List of Major League Baseball career putouts leaders
- List of Major League Baseball career runs scored leaders
- List of Major League Baseball career slugging percentage leaders
- List of Major League Baseball career WAR leaders
- List of Major League Baseball players to hit for the cycle
- List of Major League Baseball postseason records

== Notes ==
Achievements
Preceded by José Abreu	Hitting for the cycle August 9, 2018	Succeeded by Christian Yelich
Awards
Preceded by Jose Altuve	American League Player of the Month Award; July 2016	Succeeded by Gary Sánchez
Preceded by Cody Bellinger; Ronald Acuña Jr.	National League Player of the Month Award; August 2023; April 2024	Succeeded by Ronald Acuña Jr. Bryce Harper
