= David Price (baseball) =

American baseball player (born 1985)

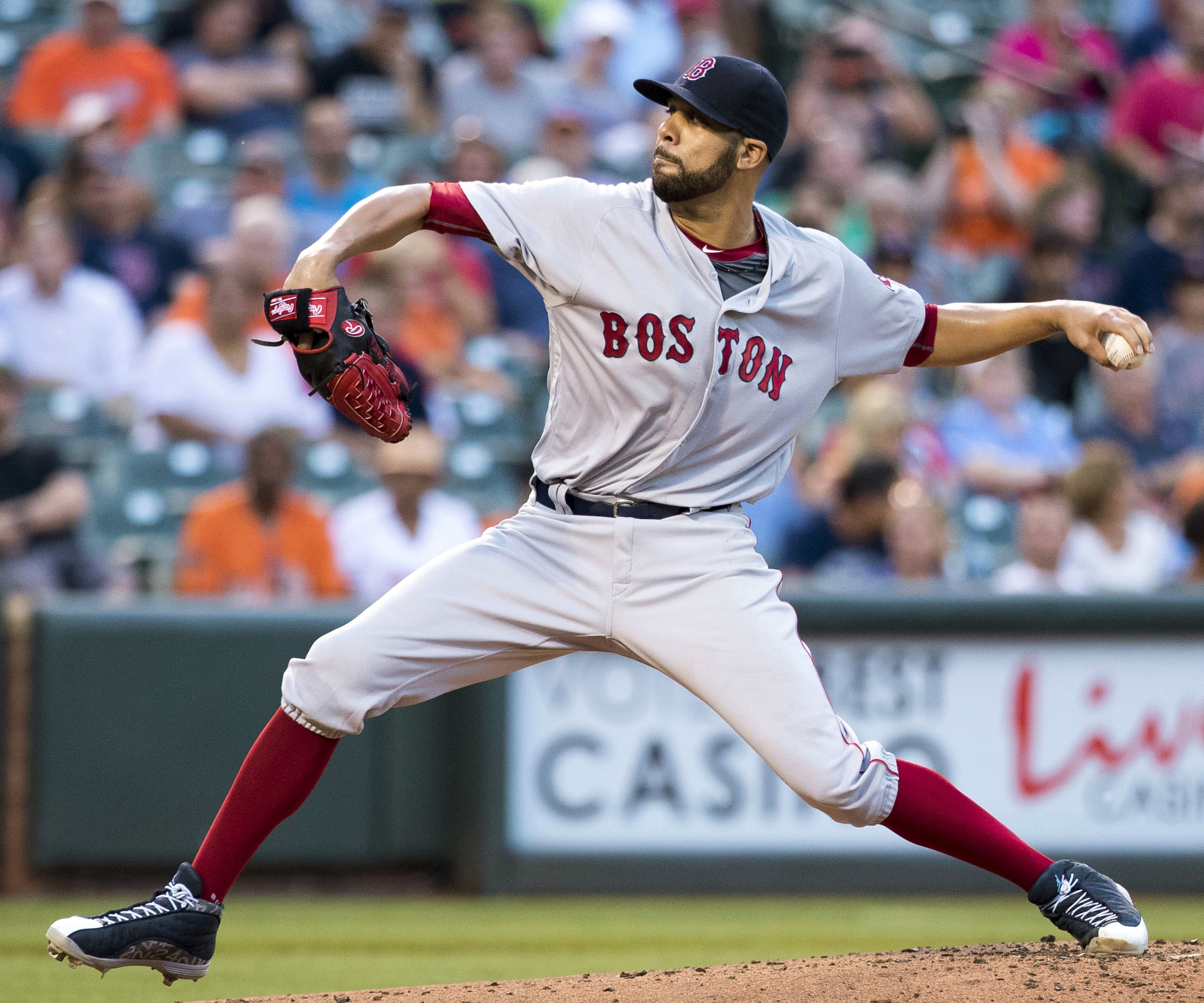
- Price with the Boston Red Sox in 2016
- Pitcher
- Born: August 26, 1985 (age 41); Murfreesboro, Tennessee, U.S.
- Batted: Left Threw: Left

MLB debut
- September 14, 2008, for the Tampa Bay Rays

Last MLB appearance
- September 30, 2022, for the Los Angeles Dodgers

MLB statistics
- Win–loss record: 157–82
- Earned run average: 3.32
- Strikeouts: 2,076
- Stats at Baseball Reference

Teams
- Tampa Bay Rays (2008–2014); Detroit Tigers (2014–2015); Toronto Blue Jays (2015); Boston Red Sox (2016–2019); Los Angeles Dodgers (2021–2022)

Career highlights and awards
- 5× All-Star (2010–2012, 2014, 2015); World Series champion (2018); AL Cy Young Award (2012); AL Comeback Player of the Year (2018); AL wins leader (2012); 2× AL ERA leader (2012, 2015); MLB strikeout leader (2014); Golden Spikes Award (2007); Dick Howser Trophy (2007)
Medals
Men's baseball
Representing United States
World University Championship
Gold medal – first place	2006 Havana	National team

David Taylor Price (born August 26, 1985) is an American former professional baseball pitcher. Price was selected first overall in the 2007 Major League Baseball draft by the Tampa Bay Devil Rays and made his Major League Baseball (MLB) debut in September 2008. He also played for the Detroit Tigers, Toronto Blue Jays, Boston Red Sox, and Los Angeles Dodgers.

Price pitched as a relief pitcher during the Rays' run through the 2008 playoffs. Weeks after his first appearance in the big leagues, he earned a save in Game 7 of the 2008 American League Championship Series (ALCS), helping the Rays reach their first World Series. Price became a full-time starting pitcher in 2009. In his second full season, he was named the American League starter for the 2010 All-Star Game and finished second in the voting for the 2010 Cy Young Award. He won the award in 2012.

The Rays traded Price to the Tigers during the 2014 season. When the Tigers fell out of the postseason race in 2015, they traded him to the Blue Jays, who won their division and advanced to the ALCS. That following off-season, the Red Sox signed Price to a franchise-record seven-year, $217 million contract. At the time, it was the largest contract total for a pitcher in Major League history. He won the series-clinching Game 5 as the Red Sox won the 2018 World Series over the Dodgers. The Red Sox traded him to the Dodgers after the 2019 season. He was part of the Los Angeles Dodgers team that won the 2020 World Series, although he did not play a single game after deciding to sit out the COVID-19 pandemic shortened season.

== Early life ==
David Taylor Price was born in Murfreesboro, Tennessee. He has two brothers. He began playing baseball in his early childhood. He grew up as an Atlanta Braves fan and idolized outfielder David Justice. He attended Cooperstown Dreams Park as a teenager, and was a standout on the Blackman High School baseball and basketball teams. In his high school career, he compiled a 0.43 earned run average (ERA) and 151 strikeouts. He received the Rutherford County MVP Pitcher (2003 and 2004), the Co-District 7AAA Pitcher of the Year with Michael Alcorn his senior season, and the Rutherford County Male Athlete of the Year in 2002, 2003 and 2004. He played in the 2004 High School All-America Game in Albuquerque, New Mexico.

== College career ==
Though Price was drafted in the 19th round of the 2004 Major League Baseball draft by the Los Angeles Dodgers out of high school, he did not sign, and instead chose to attend Vanderbilt University on an academic scholarship. He pitched for the baseball team for three seasons.

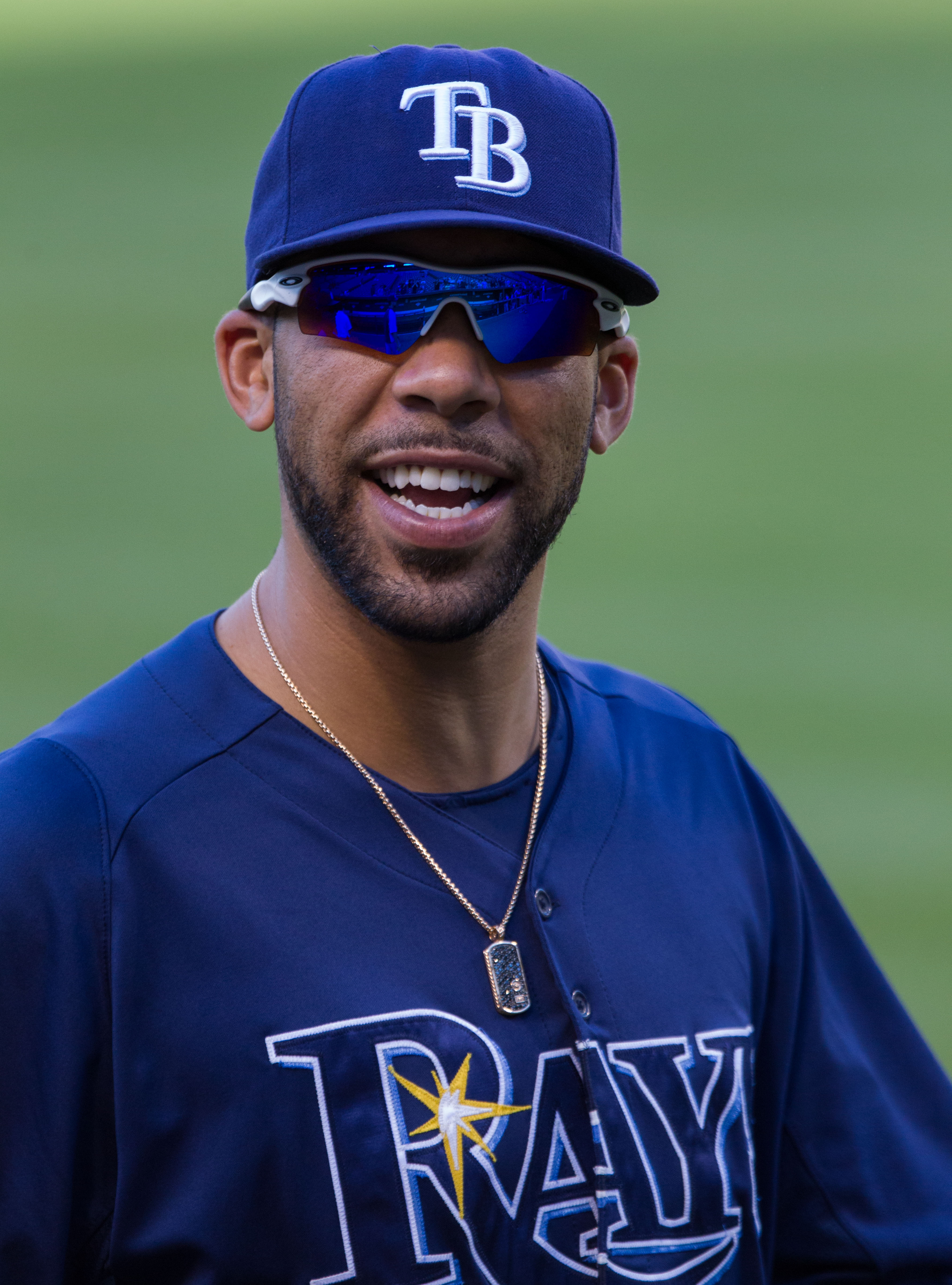
David Price in 2012

In his freshman season in 2005, Price was honored as a Freshman All-American by both Baseball America and Collegiate Baseball. That year he went 2–4 with a 2.86 ERA in 19 games, compiling 92 strikeouts in 69 1/3 innings pitched. Still, frustrated with his college workload, Price almost quit baseball to work at a McDonald's in his hometown but was talked out of it by his coach, Tim Corbin.

In 2006, Price posted a 9–5 record with a 4.16 ERA in 110 1/3 innings pitched. He set a school single-season record in strikeouts with 155 while walking only 43 batters. In six starts early in the season, he recorded 10 or more strikeouts each game, including a 17-strikeout performance in a game against Arkansas. That year, he was one of five finalists for the Golden Spikes Award and a semifinalist for the Roger Clemens Award. He was also named to the third-team All-American by the National Collegiate Baseball Writers Association, first-team All-South Region by the American Baseball Coaches Association and second-team All-SEC by the coaches in that conference.

As a junior, he tallied an 11–1 record with a 2.63 ERA. He was the nation's top strikeout pitcher, striking out 194 batters over 133 1/3 innings, breaking his own school record. His last start against SEC competition came against Mississippi State in the SEC Baseball Tournament. Price pitched a complete game, going nine innings while giving up five hits, two runs, and striking out 11 batters with no walks. His last start at the college level came against Austin Peay in Vanderbilt's first game in the 2007 Nashville Regional. Against Austin Peay, Price retired 17 batters via the strikeout in nine innings of work while yielding just five hits, one run, and two walks. Price won several major national awards, including college baseball's top honor, the 2007 Dick Howser Trophy, and the 2007 Brooks Wallace Award. David Price was the first player to have a clean sweep of all the college baseball awards.

=== United States National Team ===
In the summer of 2005, Price pitched for the United States National Team. He went 2–0 with a 1.26 ERA in five games, tallying 39 strikeouts and 13 walks over 28 2/3 innings. On August 2, 2005, he pitched a complete game shutout over Nicaragua, only allowing five hits. In the summer of 2006, Price helped the United States take home the gold medal in the World University Baseball Championship held in Cuba. In eight starts for the United States, Price was 5–1 with a 0.20 ERA.

== Professional career ==
=== Draft and minor leagues ===
Price was drafted with the first-overall pick of the 2007 Major League Baseball Draft. He signed his first professional contract on August 15, 2007. The six-year contract was worth $11.25 million ($8.5 million guaranteed), including a $5.6 million signing bonus. After the contract was approved by MLB, he was added to the Devil Rays 40-man roster before being optioned to the minor leagues to begin his career.

The total value of Price's bonus was the largest in draft history. The signing bonus was second-largest in draft history, behind only the $6.1 million Justin Upton received from the Arizona Diamondbacks as the top overall pick in the 2005 MLB draft. The guaranteed value was the third-highest in draft history, trailing only Mark Prior ($10.5 million) and Mark Teixeira ($9.5 million) from the 2001 draft. Price made his spring training debut against the Yankees, hitting the first batter he faced, Francisco Cervelli, and striking out the next three in one inning of work.

Price was first assigned to pitch for the Vero Beach Devil Rays of the Class A-Advanced Florida State League. He started six games for Vero Beach, compiling a record of 4–0. He had an ERA of 1.82 with 37 strikeouts in 34 2/3 innings pitched.

In his second start in Vero Beach, Price pitched against Pedro Martínez. After the game, Martínez said of Price:

He's amazing, that kid. He's amazing... that kid is very mature for his time in [the pros], and very talented. That kid did a hell of a job of throwing first-pitch strikes and pounding the strike zone and jamming hitters. I was watching that. He did it like a big leaguer. He had such a command. Right there, I'm challenging you. I'm going to do what I gotta do without any fear. That's the kind of talent you love to see.

After moving up through the Rays minor league system to the Montgomery Biscuits of the Class AA Southern League in July, Price was promoted to the Durham Bulls of the Class AAA International League on August 9, 2008. After compiling an 11–0 combined record at Single-A and Double-A, Price received his first professional loss in his first start at Triple-A Durham.

=== Tampa Bay Rays (2008–2014) ===
==== 2008 ====
Price made his major league debut with the Tampa Bay Rays on September 14, 2008, against the Yankees. The first MLB hit he allowed was a home run by New York Yankees shortstop Derek Jeter; Jeter later recorded his 3,000th hit by again homering off Price in 2011. Price pitched 5 1/3 innings of relief; he made his first major league start with the Rays on September 22, 2008, against the Baltimore Orioles. He was the winning pitcher in Game 2 of the 2008 ALCS against the Boston Red Sox, earning a postseason victory before winning a regular-season game. Price recorded the final four outs in Game 7 of the 2008 ALCS, earning his first career save (regular season or postseason; postseason statistics are recorded separately) and eliminating the defending champion Red Sox. Price then pitched 2 1/3 innings in Game 2 of the 2008 World Series against the Philadelphia Phillies; he gave up two earned runs but nevertheless earned his second postseason save. The next day, Price introduced Barack Obama at a campaign rally in Tampa.

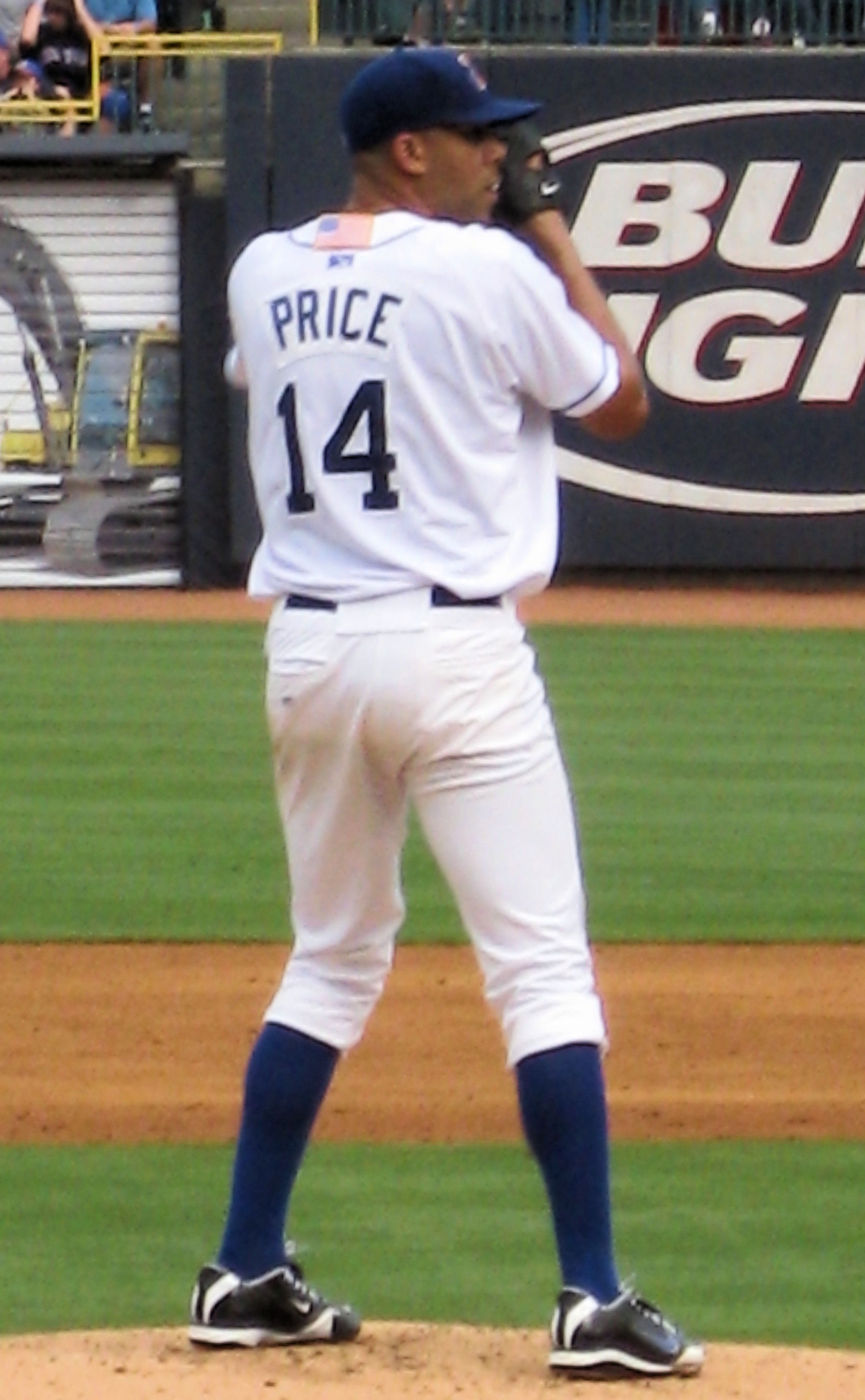
Price with the Durham Bulls in 2009

==== 2009 ====
On May 30, 2009, Price collected his first major league regular-season win with a 5–2 victory over the Minnesota Twins in which he struck out 11 batters in under 6 innings. He completed the season with a 10–7 record, a 4.42 ERA, 102 strikeouts, and 54 walks in 23 starts.

==== 2010: Breakout season ====
In the 2010 season, Price was the first American League pitcher to reach 10 wins, on June 15. On that date, he was 10–2 and led the league with a 2.31 ERA. Price was selected as the American League starting pitcher for the 2010 All-Star Game.

He finished the 2010 season tied for second in the American League (with Jon Lester) in wins (19) and in third place in ERA (2.72). He was eighth in the league in strikeouts with 188. He finished second in voting for the AL Cy Young Award behind Félix Hernández.

He lost Games 1 and 5 of the 2010 American League Division Series against Cliff Lee and the Texas Rangers.

==== 2011 ====
During a game against the Yankees on July 9, 2011, Price allowed a home run to Derek Jeter, which was Jeter's 3,000th career hit. Price finished 2011 with a 12–13 record, 218 strikeouts, and a 3.49 ERA in 34 games started.

==== 2012: Cy Young Award ====
In 2012, Price went 20–5 on the season (tying for the league lead in wins) with a league-leading 2.54 ERA. Price pitched a complete-game shutout against the Los Angeles Angels on April 24, 2012, with the final score 5–0. Price pitched in the 2012 MLB All-Star Game. Price got his 20th win against the Chicago White Sox on September 30, making him the first 20-win pitcher in Rays franchise history. In recording the win, he became the youngest American League pitcher (aged 27) to earn 20 wins in a season since 2004. Price won the AL Cy Young Award after a tight race.

==== 2013 ====
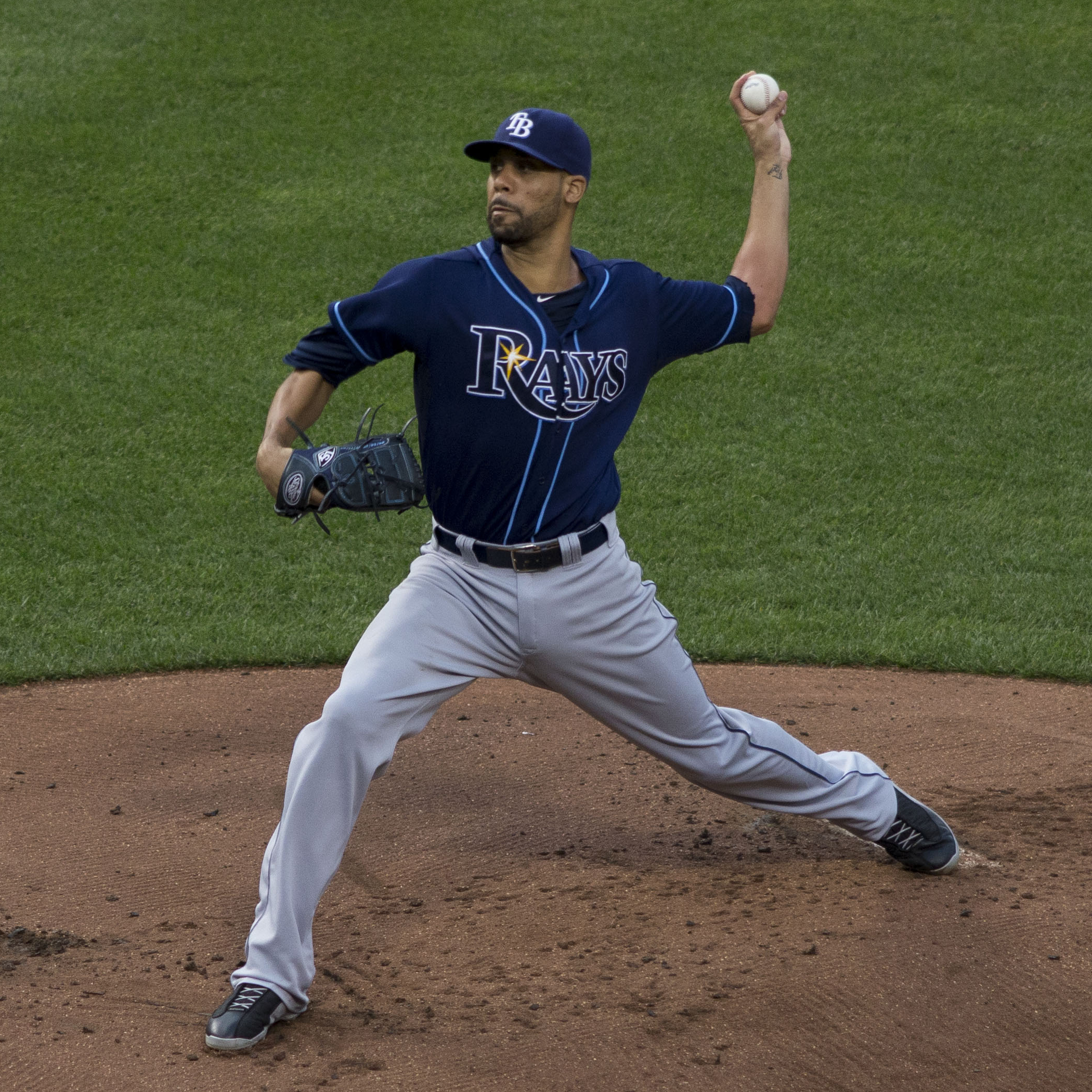
Price pitching for the Tampa Bay Rays in 2013

In 2013, Price went 10–8 on the season with a 3.33 ERA, and had an American League-leading and career-best four complete games. In the 2013 American League Wild Card tie-breaker against the Texas Rangers, Price pitched a complete game to lead the Rays into the postseason.

==== 2014 ====
From June 4 to 25, Price had five consecutive starts with at least ten strikeouts, becoming only the eighth pitcher in major league history to do so.

On July 6, Price was named to his fourth All-Star team; he did not participate in this All-Star game due to pitching in a game two days prior, avoiding pitching on only one day of rest. He was replaced by Fernando Rodney.

Before a July 31 trade to the Detroit Tigers, Price had a record of 11–8, with a 3.11 ERA, 189 strikeouts, and 23 walks in 23 starts with the Rays.

=== Detroit Tigers (2014–2015) ===
==== 2014: MLB Strikeouts leader ====
On July 31, Price was traded to the Detroit Tigers in a three-team deal that sent Drew Smyly, Nick Franklin and Willy Adames to the Tampa Bay Rays, and Austin Jackson to the Seattle Mariners. In his Tigers debut against the New York Yankees on August 5, Price pitched 8 2/3 innings, allowing three runs, striking out ten, and walking none.

On August 21, in his first game against his former team, the Tampa Bay Rays, Price allowed one hit and an unearned run with one out in the first inning, then retired the final 23 batters he faced, but suffered a complete game loss. Price is the first pitcher in the major leagues to lose a complete game, one-hitter or better, with no earned runs since Andy Hawkins lost a no-hitter for the New York Yankees on July 1, 1990. It was the first time since 1914 that a pitcher has lost a complete game, one-hit, no walk start without allowing an earned run.

On August 27, in a game against the Yankees, Price allowed eight runs and twelve hits, including nine straight in the third inning of an 8–4 loss. He is the first pitcher since Bob Forsch in 1989 to allow nine straight hits. Only three previous times in major league history had a pitcher allowed 12 hits in two innings or fewer, the others being Shawn Estes in 2003, Johnny Podres in 1963 and George Uhle in 1929.

With the Tigers, Price went 4–4 over the final two months of the season, with a 3.59 ERA and 82 strikeouts in 77 2/3 innings. On September 28, the last day of the regular season, Price pitched 7 1/3 shutout innings against the Minnesota Twins, giving up four hits, striking out eight, and earning the 3–0 win, to help the Tigers clinch their fourth consecutive AL Central Division title.

Price finished the 2014 regular season with a 15–12 record, 3.26 ERA and 1.08 WHIP. He led all of major league baseball in innings pitched (248 1/3), batters faced (1,009) and strikeouts (271).

==== 2015 season: AL ERA leader ====
On January 16, 2015, Price and the Tigers avoided arbitration agreeing on a $19.75 million salary for the 2015 season, setting a record for the largest one-year deal for an arbitration-eligible player prior to free agency. Price was named the Tigers opening day starter for 2015 by manager Brad Ausmus, ending teammate Justin Verlander's streak of seven consecutive opening day starts. He responded by pitching 8 2/3 shutout innings in the Tigers 4–0 win over the Minnesota Twins.

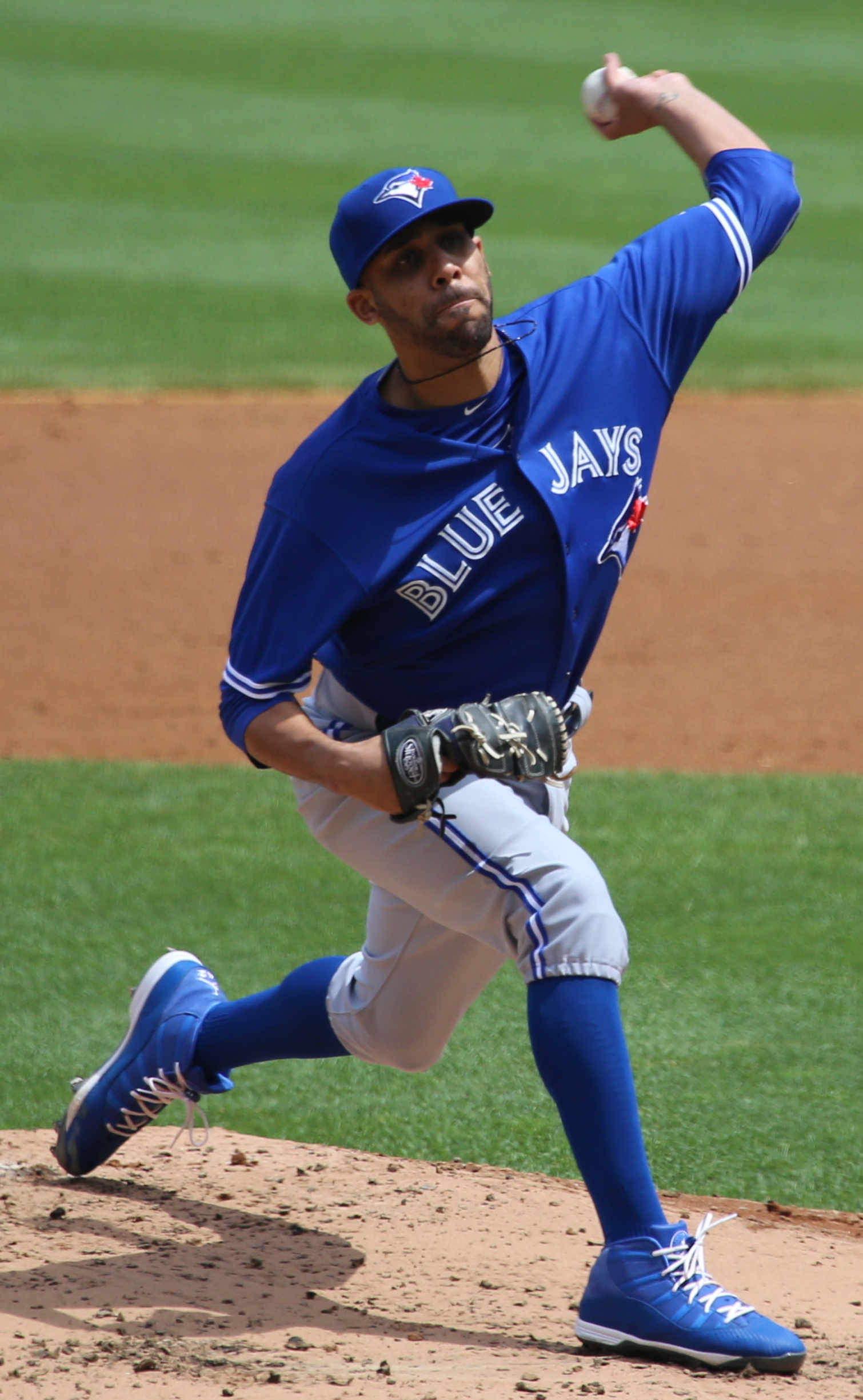
Price pitching for the Toronto Blue Jays in 2015

On July 6, 2015, Price was named to the 2015 All-Star Game, his fifth such honor. Price pitched a scoreless fourth inning in the game, striking out two, and earning the win for the AL. He entered the All-Star Break with a 9–2 record, 2.38 ERA and 115 strikeouts.

=== Toronto Blue Jays (2015) ===
==== 2015 ====
On July 30, 2015, Price was traded to the Toronto Blue Jays for Daniel Norris, Matt Boyd and Jairo Labourt. Price made his debut for the Blue Jays on August 3. He threw 119 pitches in 8 innings, recording 11 strikeouts and a winning decision, while yielding only 3 hits, 2 walks, and 1 earned run in a 5–1 victory over the Minnesota Twins at Rogers Centre. His 11 strikeouts tied José Núñez's team record for most strikeouts in a Blue Jays' pitching debut. On September 5, Price earned his 100th career win, by beating the Baltimore Orioles 5–1. He was scratched from his final start of the season on October 1, as the Blue Jays had clinched the AL East the previous day. Price made 11 starts for the Blue Jays in 2015, and went 9–1 with a 2.30 ERA and 87 strikeouts in 74 1/3 innings. Price started Game 1 of the ALDS for the Blue Jays, taking the loss and bringing his career postseason record to 1–6. He earned his second career postseason win on October 12, pitching 3 innings in relief of R. A. Dickey's game 4 start.

Price finished the 2015 season with an 18–5 record and a 2.45 ERA. Price finished second in Cy Young Award balloting to Dallas Keuchel.

=== Boston Red Sox (2016–2019) ===
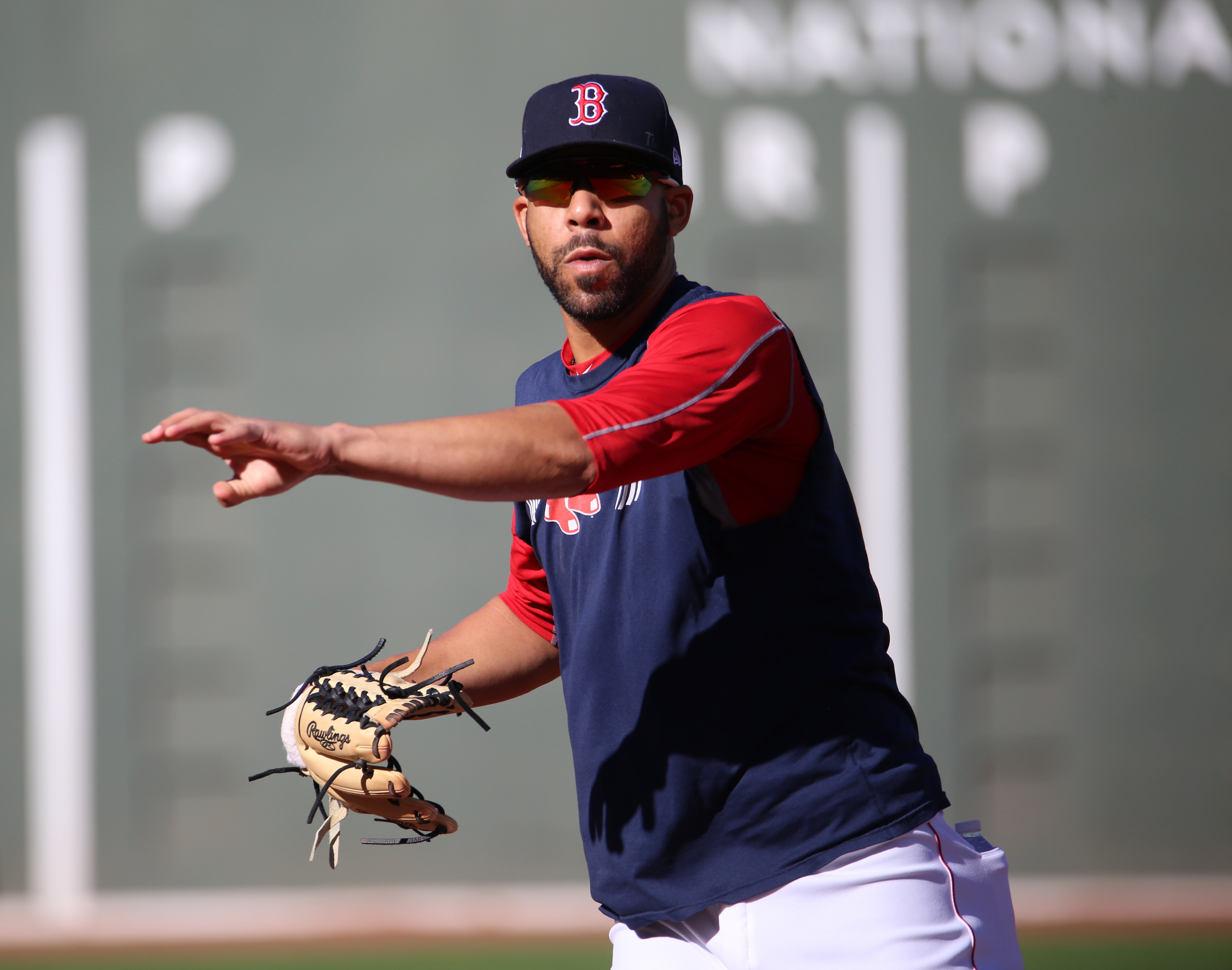
Price with the Boston Red Sox in 2016

==== 2016 ====
On December 4, 2015, Price signed a seven-year, $217 million contract with the Boston Red Sox, a franchise record. Price recorded a win in his debut with the Red Sox on April 5, 2016. Price's first season was markedly different from the first to second half. In his first 18 starts, Price compiled an 8–6 record with a 4.64 ERA. He finished the season at 3.99 ERA with a 17–9 record. He led the AL with 230 innings pitched and 227 hits allowed. His 228 strikeouts also marked the second-highest in his career, after his 2014 season split between Tampa and Detroit. Additionally, he was the first pitcher to start 35 games since Chris Carpenter in 2010.

==== 2017 ====
Price started the season on the 10-day disabled list with an elbow injury suffered in spring training. Price was activated on Monday, May 29, 2017, and made his debut against the Chicago White Sox that afternoon.

On June 29, Price was involved in a verbal altercation with NESN broadcaster and Hall of Fame pitcher Dennis Eckersley on the team's plane; Eckersley had criticized a poor performance by teammate Eduardo Rodríguez, prompting Price to yell, "Here he is — the greatest pitcher who ever lived! This game is easy for him!’’ at Eckersley, before doubling down with numerous repetitions of "Get the fuck out of here!" to the applause of several Red Sox players. Price was criticized for his berating of Eckersley, as well as his refusal to apologize, by both the media and fans.

On July 28, Price was again placed on the 10-day disabled list due to left elbow inflammation. He returned to the Red Sox on September 14 and was used from a reliever role for the rest of the season. In the 2017 American League Division Series against the Houston Astros, Price pitched 6 2/3 scoreless innings, including four innings in Game 3. The Red Sox eventually lost the series, 3–1.

==== 2018: World Series champion ====
During spring training prior to the 2018 season, Price said he wished he had handled the situation with Eckersley differently and said he knew he could win the fans back by pitching well. "If I go out pitch the way I'm capable of pitching, they won't care," he said. Price returned to the rotation to start the 2018 season and threw 14 scoreless innings in his first two starts, exiting the second one to a standing ovation from the crowd at Fenway Park. "When he's healthy, he's one of the best pitchers in the league," said Red Sox manager Alex Cora of Price after the game. On May 9, Price was scratched from a scheduled start against the Yankees due to a mild case of carpal tunnel syndrome. During the 2018 regular season, Price made 30 appearances (all starts) with a 16–7 record, 3.58 ERA, and 177 strikeouts in 176 innings.

In the postseason, Price started Game 2 of the Division Series against the New York Yankees. He allowed three runs on three hits and was removed after 1 1/3 innings, taking the loss. This was the tenth postseason game that Price had started during his career, all ten of which had resulted in losses for his teams. Price's next postseason start was Game 2 of the Championship Series against the Houston Astros, which the Red Sox won, 7–5, with Price allowing four runs, five hits, and four walks in 4 2/3 innings; he received a no decision as he did not complete the fifth inning. When Chris Sale became unavailable to start Game 5 of that series for health reasons, Price was called on to start again on only three days' rest, and earned the win, holding Houston scoreless through six innings while allowing just three hits and striking out nine. Winning 4–1, the Red Sox clinched their first trip to the World Series since 2013. It was Price's first win in 12 career postseason starts, and his third postseason win overall; the two earlier wins had been earned in relief during the 2008 ALCS and 2015 ALDS.

Price next started Game 2 of the World Series, holding the Dodgers to two runs on three hits and three walks in six innings while striking out five, and earning the win in a 4–2 Boston victory. Price also pitched scoreless relief in Game 3 and warmed up in the bullpen for Game 4. Although ace Chris Sale was available on full rest (albeit with a shoulder injury), Price started Game 5, with Alex Cora reasoning that a National League park could require a pinch hitter that would cause him to remove his starter early. Price surrendered a home run to David Freese on his first pitch, but then retired 14 batters in a row. He was relieved in the eighth inning with Boston leading, 5–1; Joe Kelly and Sale got the final six outs to clinch the World Series victory.

On October 31, prior to the Red Sox victory parade, Price announced that he would not exercise an opt-out clause in his contract, saying that he wants to win in Boston; "We did that this year, and I want to do it again." In early November, the New York City chapter of the Baseball Writers' Association of America (BBWAA) announced Price as the Babe Ruth Award recipient, honoring MLB player with the best performance in the postseason. Later in November, Price was announced as the AL Comeback Player of the Year.

==== 2019 ====
Prior to the season, Price announced that he was changing his uniform number from 24 to 10, a tribute to his son Xavier, since "X" represents the Roman numeral ten. Price began the season as a member of the starting rotation, pitching to a 1–2 record with 3.75 ERA in six starts, until being placed on the injured list on May 6, retroactive to May 3, due to left elbow tendinitis. He was activated on May 20, starting and getting the win in a game against Toronto. From May 20 to July 7, Price won 6 straight decisions. Price was briefly on the paternity list in early August, as his wife gave birth to their second child; at the time, he had a 7–4 record with 3.86 ERA in 20 starts, with 123 strikeouts in 102 2/3 innings. Price was placed on the injured list on August 8, retroactive to August 5, due to a left wrist triangular fibrocartilage (TFCC) cyst. He was activated from the injured list on September 1. He pitched that day, then was held out of the rotation due to additional concern about his wrist. He did not pitch again during the season, finishing with 22 appearances (all starts), recording 128 strikeouts in 107 1/3 innings and a 7–5 record with a 4.28 ERA.

=== Los Angeles Dodgers (2021–2022) ===
On February 10, 2020, the Red Sox traded Price, Mookie Betts, and cash consideration to the Los Angeles Dodgers in exchange for Alex Verdugo, Connor Wong and Jeter Downs. In May 2020, Price announced he would donate $1,000 to each of the Dodgers minor league players in an effort to help offset their costs during the COVID-19 pandemic. On July 4, 2020, Price announced that he would not play during the shortened 2020 season amidst the COVID-19 pandemic. The Dodgers went on to win the 2020 World Series and the team gave Price a World Series ring, despite not playing a single game for the team that season. Price auctioned his ring off in order to help raise money for The Players Alliance.

==== 2021 ====
On April 15, 2021, Price picked up his first regular season save of his career against the Colorado Rockies. On May 27, Price struck out his former teammate and fellow Vanderbilt alum Curt Casali of the San Francisco Giants for his 2,000th career strikeout. Price pitched in 39 games for the Dodgers in the 2021 season, which included 11 starts, and finished 5–2 with a 4.03 ERA. Price was active for the NLDS but did not appear in a game, then was left off the roster for the NLCS but was added for Game 6 after an injury to Joe Kelly, but he did not appear in that series either.

==== 2022 ====
In early September, Price was placed on the injured list following 38 appearances in the 2022 season, all of them out of the bullpen. During an interview with USA Today's Bob Nightengale, Price said he was considering retirement following the 2022 season. "It's just time," he said. "Everything on my body hurts." As news of his potential retirement spread, Price clarified to news outlets that he had not made a final decision on the timing of his retirement and that he planned to return to pitching in time for the postseason. He pitched out of the bullpen in two more games that season, in late September. It was the first season in his career where he had not started any games. He allowed 11 runs in 40 1/3 innings for a 2.45 ERA, and did not pitch in the postseason.

On December 5, 2022, Price announced that he would not pitch in MLB during the 2023 season.

== Scouting report ==
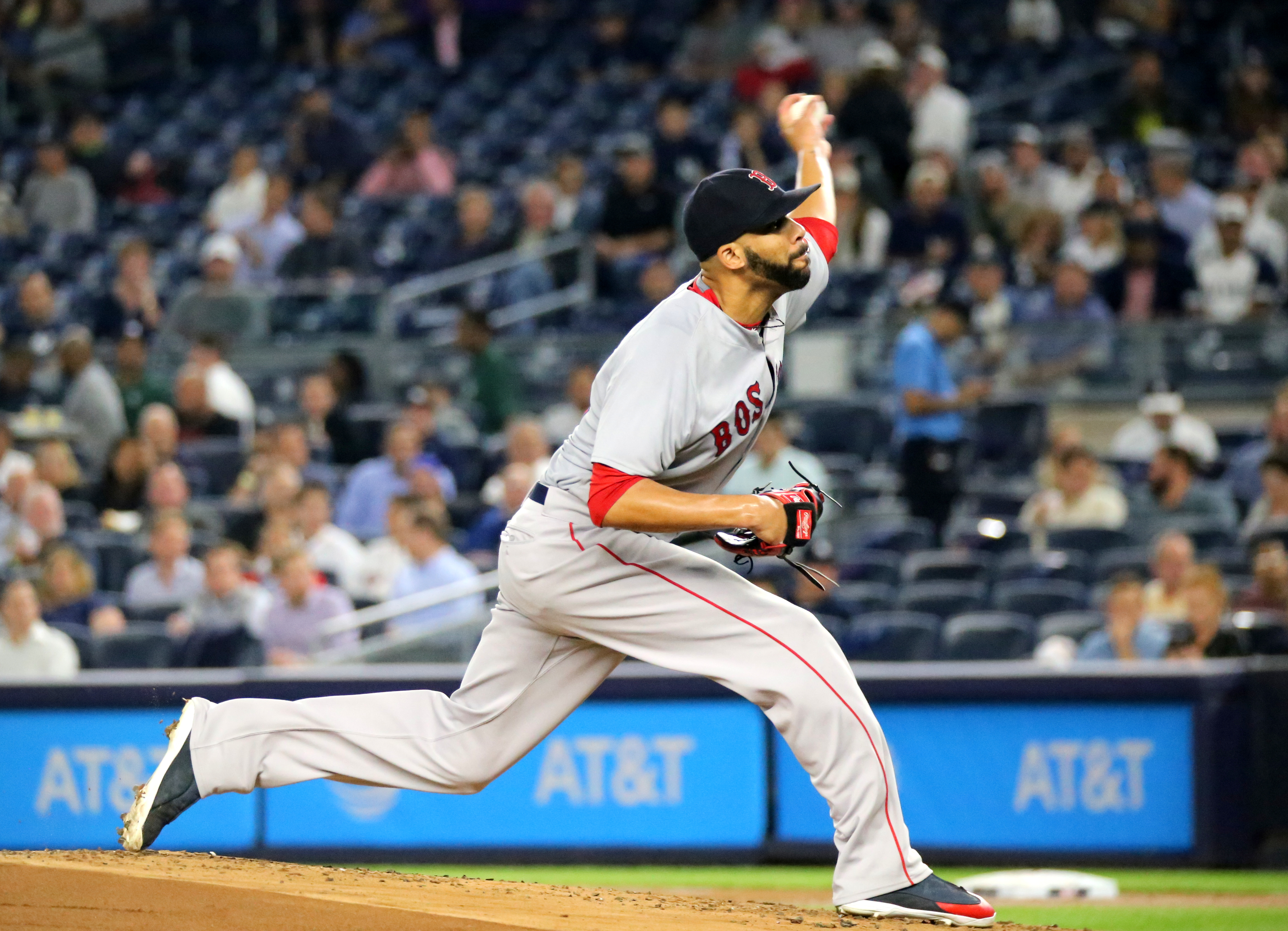
Price delivers a pitch for the Red Sox in 2016

Price used a wide variety of pitches and complemented them with excellent velocity. He threw two fastballs in the 93–96 mph (150–154 km/h) range, topping out at 98 mph (158 km/h); a four-seamer and a two-seamer. His two-seamer was his lead pitch against right-handed and left-handed hitters, although he used it more often against lefties. Price also threw a cutter at 90–92 mph (145–148 km/h), used mainly against right-handed hitters (especially in two-strike counts). He rounded out his repertoire with a changeup he used mainly against right-handed hitters, but also featured to left-handed hitters, at 83–86 mph (134–138 km/h), and a spike curveball at 78–81 mph (126–130 km/h).

Price tended to set the pace early in games, taking 5–7 seconds to pitch the ball after it was returned by the catcher.

Price's style of pitching resulted in what some call the "Price rule", which makes a pitcher specify whether he is working from a set position (often called the stretch) or a full windup position when a runner is on third.

== Select awards and honors ==
- 2012 Cy Young Award
- 2010 Warren Spahn Award
- 2010 American League All Star starter
- 2007 Roger Clemens Award
- 2007 Golden Spikes Award
- 2007 Dick Howser Trophy
- 2007 Baseball America College Player of the Year
- 2007 American Baseball Coaches Association National Player of the Year
- 2007 American Baseball Coaches Association First Team All American
- 2007 Brooks Wallace Award
- 2007 Baseball America College All-America First Team
- 2007 Collegiate Baseball National Player of the Year
- 2007 National Collegiate Baseball Writers Association First Team All-American
- 2007 National Collegiate Baseball Writers Association District Player of the Year
- 2007 SEC Male Athlete of the Year
- 2007 SEC Pitcher of the Year
- 2007 First Team All-SEC
- 2006 Golden Spikes Award Finalist
- 2006 Baseball America Summer Player of the Year

== Personal life ==
Price married longtime girlfriend Tiffany Smith in November 2016. The couple's first child was born in May 2017. Their second child was born in August 2019. They own property in Naples, Florida, Nashville, Tennessee, and Paradise Valley, Arizona.

== See also ==
- Black Aces, African-American pitchers with a 20-win MLB season
- List of World Series starting pitchers
- List of Major League Baseball career strikeout leaders

Awards and achievements
Preceded by Roy Halladay	American League All-Star Game Starting Pitcher; 2010	Succeeded by Jered Weaver
