= Alex Verdugo =

American baseball player (born 1996)

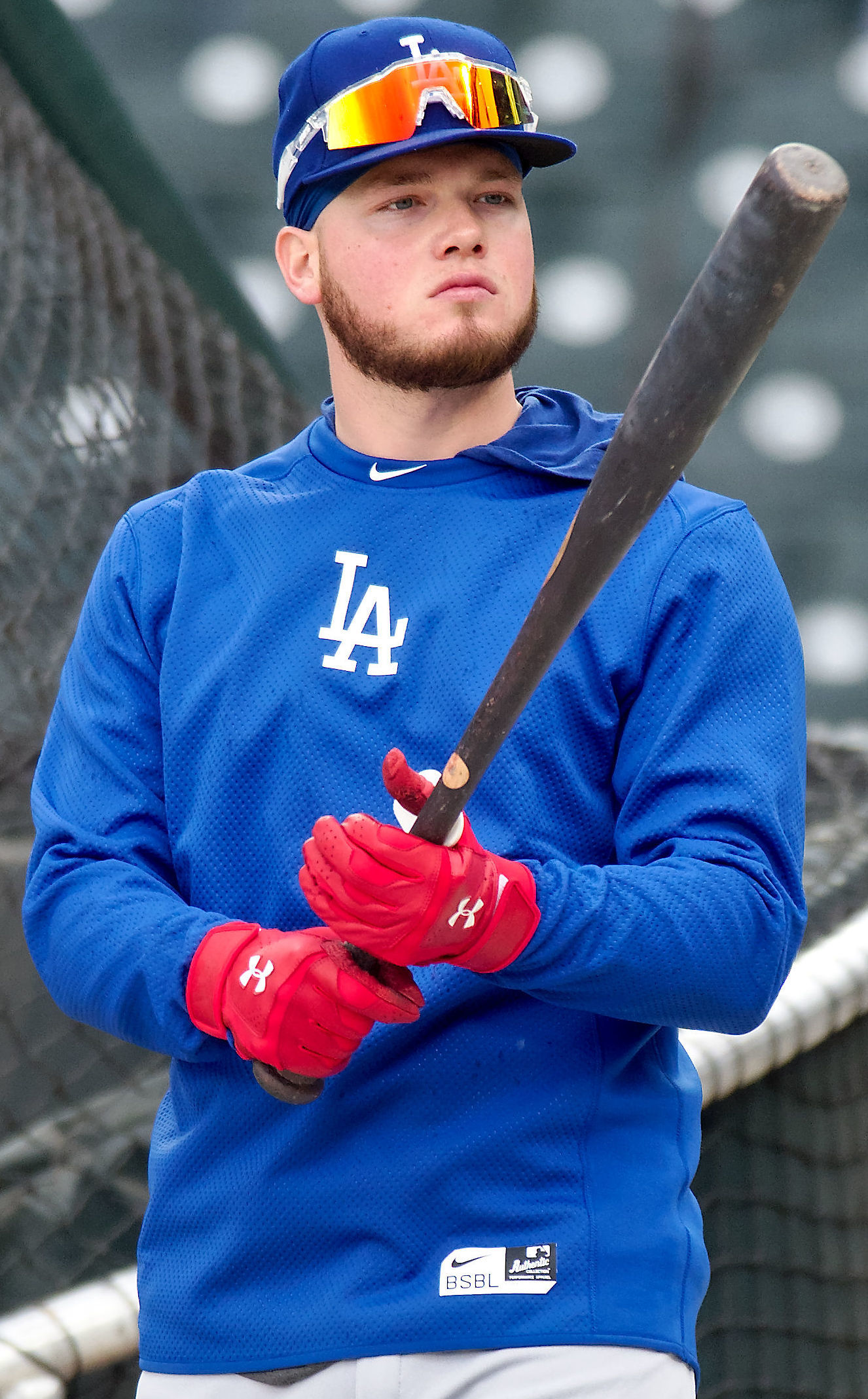
- Verdugo with the Los Angeles Dodgers in 2019

Free agent
- Outfielder
- Born: May 15, 1996 (age 30); Tucson, Arizona, U.S.
- Bats: Left Throws: Left

MLB debut
- September 1, 2017, for the Los Angeles Dodgers

MLB statistics (through 2025 season)
- Batting average: .270
- Home runs: 70
- Runs batted in: 328
- Stats at Baseball Reference

Teams
- Los Angeles Dodgers (2017–2019); Boston Red Sox (2020–2023); New York Yankees (2024); Atlanta Braves (2025)
Medals
Men's baseball
Representing Mexico
World Baseball Classic
Bronze medal – third place	2023 Miami	Team

Alexander Brady Verdugo (born May 15, 1996) is an American professional baseball outfielder who is a free agent. He has previously played in Major League Baseball (MLB) for the Los Angeles Dodgers, Boston Red Sox, New York Yankees, and Atlanta Braves.

The Dodgers selected Verdugo in the second round of the 2014 MLB draft. He made his MLB debut with the Dodgers in 2017, was traded to the Red Sox after the 2019 season, and was traded to the Yankees prior to the 2024 season. In 2017, Verdugo committed to represent the Mexican national team and was later called up for the 2017 and 2023 World Baseball Classics.

== Early life ==
Verdugo's father, Joe, is from Hermosillo, Sonora, Mexico. His mother, Shelly, is from Minnesota. Verdugo attended Sahuaro High School in Tucson, Arizona.

== Professional career ==
=== Los Angeles Dodgers ===
==== Minor leagues ====
The Los Angeles Dodgers selected Verdugo in the second round of the 2014 Major League Baseball draft. He signed with the Dodgers, forgoing his commitment to play college baseball at Arizona State University. In 49 games for the Arizona League Dodgers, he hit .347 and was awarded with post-season Arizona League All-Star honors and Baseball America Rookie league All-Star honors. He was assigned to the Single-A Great Lakes Loons of the Midwest League to start 2015. He was selected to the post-season all-star team after he hit .295 in 101 games. Verdugo also received a late season promotion to the High-A Rancho Cucamonga Quakes of the California League where he played in 23 games and hit .385. He also hit for the cycle in a game against the Lancaster JetHawks on August 27. He was named the organization's minor league player of the year.

To start the 2016 season, Verdugo was promoted to the Double-A Tulsa Drillers of the Texas League, where he was selected as a starter for the mid-season all-star game and named to the post-season all-star team. He had a .273 batting average in 126 games for the Drillers and hit 13 home runs with 63 RBIs. He was assigned to the Glendale Desert Dogs of the Arizona Fall League at the conclusion of the season, and batted .140/.213/.233. Verdugo also played for the Mexico national baseball team in an exhibition series in Japan in November and in the 2017 World Baseball Classic. He began 2017 with the Oklahoma City Dodgers and was named as a starter for the mid-season Pacific Coast League all-star team and chosen to represent the world team at the All-Star Futures Game. In 117 games for Oklahoma City, he hit .314.

==== Major leagues ====
Verdugo was promoted to the majors for the first time on September 1, 2017. He made his MLB debut as the starting center fielder that night against the San Diego Padres and was hitless in three at-bats with one walk. His first MLB hit was a single off of Clayton Richard of the Padres on September 2. He hit his first major league home run on September 10 off of Adam Ottavino of the Colorado Rockies. Verdugo was kept off the playoff roster that lost to the Houston Astros in the 2017 World Series. He played in 16 games for the Dodgers in 2017 and had four hits in 23 at-bats, batting .174/.240/.304.

In 2018, he was selected to represent the Pacific Coast League at the Triple-A All-Star Game and was also selected to the post-season all-star team. He appeared in 37 games for the Dodgers, hitting .260 while spending most of the season with Oklahoma City, where he hit .329.

On March 23, 2019, Verdugo was announced as a member of the 2019 Dodgers opening day roster. He appeared in 106 games for the Dodgers, with a .294 batting average, 12 home runs and 44 RBIs. He played center field while A. J. Pollock was out with an injury but lost playing time when Pollock returned. Verdugo went on the injured list on August 6 with an oblique strain and later came down with a back injury during a rehab assignment. The injury kept him out the rest of the season and the playoffs.

=== Boston Red Sox ===
On February 10, 2020, the Dodgers traded Verdugo, Jeter Downs, and Connor Wong to the Boston Red Sox in exchange for Mookie Betts, David Price, and cash considerations. During the start-delayed 2020 season, he was a regular corner outfielder for Boston, appearing in 22 games in left field and 31 games in right field. Overall with the 2020 Red Sox, Verdugo batted .308 with six home runs and 15 RBIs in 53 games. Of all qualified major league outfielders, Verdugo had the best fielding percentage, at .959.

Verdugo began the 2021 season as a regular member of Boston's outfield, playing all three positions. He was placed on the paternity list on August 8, and returned to the team on August 13. He played in 146 regular-season games for Boston, batting .289 with 13 home runs and 63 RBIs. He also played in 11 postseason games, batting 13-for-42 (.310) as the Red Sox advanced to the American League Championship Series. Late in the season, Verdugo expressed his desire to become a two-way player, saying that he wanted to not be "Shohei Ohtani where he is starting and all that" but that he wanted to be a two-way player by the 2023 season. Beginning in 2021, Verdugo started experiencing blistering, bleeding, scabbing and pain in his hands.

Verdugo returned as a corner outfielder for Boston during 2022, appearing in 150 games in the outfield and two at designated hitter. He batted .280 with 11 home runs and 74 RBIs. At the end of the regular season, Red Sox manager Alex Cora highlighted Verdugo as a player who could improve for 2023, stating, “Yeah, he hit for average, but he can be a lot better baserunning, defensively."

On January 13, 2023, the Red Sox and Verdugo reached agreement on a one-year contract, avoiding salary arbitration. He batted .303 with five home runs and 31 RBIs through June 22, when he was placed on the bereavement list. He returned to the team on June 27.

=== New York Yankees ===
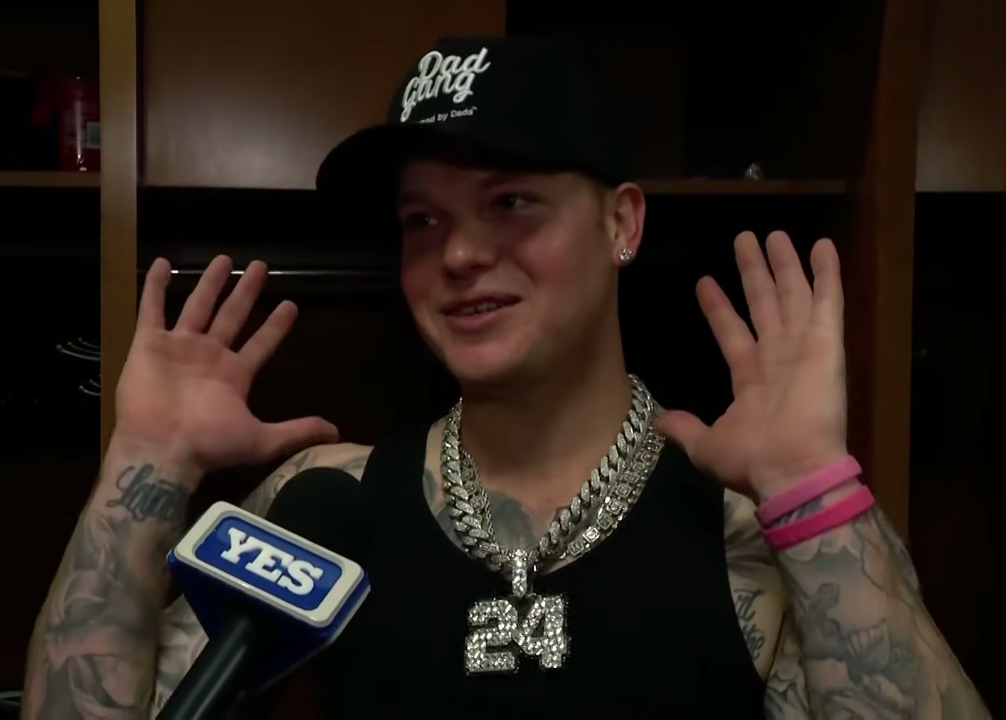
Verdugo with the Yankees in 2024

On December 5, 2023, the Red Sox traded Verdugo to the New York Yankees for Richard Fitts, Greg Weissert, and Nicholas Judice.

After struggling to start the 2024 season and continuing to experience the skin issues and pain which had been present in his hands since 2021, Verdugo submitted to an allergy test during the All-Star break. It was determined that he was allergic to the cobalt and chromate in his batting gloves. Verdugo played in 149 games for the Yankees in 2024, batting .233/.291/.356 with 13 home runs and 61 RBI. Verdugo was the final out of the 2024 World Series, striking out against Walker Buehler. After the season, he became a free agent.

=== Atlanta Braves ===
On March 20, 2025, Verdugo signed a one-year, $1.5 million contract with the Atlanta Braves. He subsequently consented to being optioned to the Triple-A Gwinnett Stripers to begin the season, in order to get in shape after missing spring training. Verdugo joined the active roster on April 17. He appeared in 56 games for the Braves, slashing .239/.296/.289 with no home runs and 12 RBI. On July 2, Verdugo was designated for assignment by Atlanta. He was released by the Braves after clearing waivers on July 5.

=== San Diego Padres ===
On March 1, 2026, Verdugo signed a minor league contract with the San Diego Padres. He did not make an appearance during his time with the organization, and was released on May 11. Concurrently, it was announced that Verdugo would require season-ending surgery to repair a recent shoulder injury.

== Personal life ==
Verdugo and his partner, Yamille Alcala, have two sons and a daughter.
