= Jeter Downs =

Nicaraguan baseball player (born 1998)

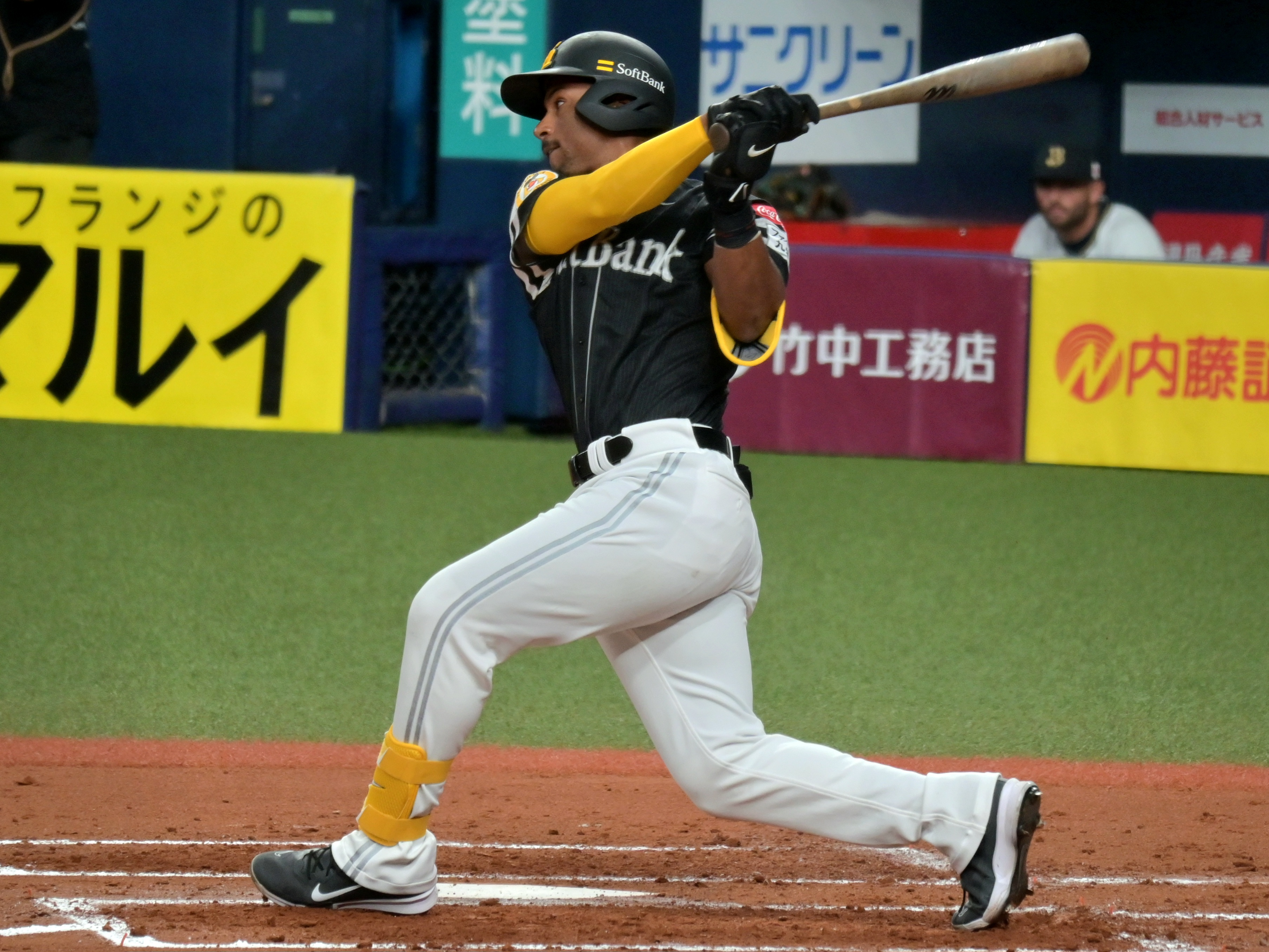
- Downs with the Fukuoka SoftBank Hawks in 2024

Free agent
- Infielder
- Born: July 27, 1998 (age 28); San Andrés, Colombia
- Bats: Right Throws: Right

Professional debut
- MLB: June 22, 2022, for the Boston Red Sox
- NPB: September 25, 2024, for the Fukuoka SoftBank Hawks

MLB statistics (through 2023 season)
- Batting average: .182
- Home runs: 1
- Runs batted in: 5

NPB statistics (through 2026 season)
- Batting average: .222
- Home runs: 5
- Runs batted in: 20
- Stats at Baseball Reference

Teams
- Boston Red Sox (2022); Washington Nationals (2023); Fukuoka SoftBank Hawks (2024–2026)

Career highlights and awards
- 2x Japan Series champion (2025, 2026)

Jeter Deion Downs Mitchell (born July 27, 1998) is a Colombian professional baseball infielder who is a free agent. He has previously played in Major League Baseball (MLB) for the Boston Red Sox and Washington Nationals and in Nippon Professional Baseball (NPB) for the Fukuoka SoftBank Hawks. Listed at 5 feet 11 inches (1.80 m) and 195 pounds (88 kg), he bats and throws right-handed.

== Early life and education ==
Downs was born on July 27, 1998, in San Andrés, Colombia. His father, Jerry Sr., had played professional baseball in Colombia. He was named after Baseball Hall of Fame shortstop Derek Jeter. To facilitate better baseball opportunities for him and his brother, Jerry Jr., the family moved to Miami, Florida.

Downs attended Monsignor Edward Pace High School in Miami Gardens, Florida, and played for the school's baseball team as a shortstop. He committed to attend the University of Miami on a college baseball scholarship.

== Professional career ==
=== Cincinnati Reds ===
The Cincinnati Reds selected Downs with the 32nd overall selection of the 2017 Major League Baseball draft. He signed with the Reds for a $1.825 million signing bonus. After signing, he was assigned to the Billings Mustangs of the Rookie-level Pioneer League, where he spent all of his first professional season, posting a .267 batting average with six home runs and 29 runs batted in (RBI) in 50 games. Downs spent the 2018 season with the Dayton Dragons of the Single-A Midwest League where he hit .257 with 13 home runs, 47 RBI, and 37 stolen bases in 120 games.

=== Los Angeles Dodgers ===
On December 21, 2018, the Reds traded Downs to the Los Angeles Dodgers with Homer Bailey and Josiah Gray for Matt Kemp, Yasiel Puig, Alex Wood, Kyle Farmer, and cash considerations. He began 2019 with the Rancho Cucamonga Quakes and was selected to the mid-season California League all-star game and post-season league all-star team. He played in 107 games for Rancho Cucamonga, hitting .269 with 19 homers and 75 RBIs. The Dodgers promoted him to the Double-A Tulsa Drillers of the Texas League on August 20, 2019, where he hit .333 in 12 games with five home runs and 11 RBIs.

=== Boston Red Sox ===
The Dodgers traded Downs, Alex Verdugo, and Connor Wong to the Boston Red Sox for Mookie Betts, David Price, and cash considerations on February 10, 2020. Downs did not play during 2020, due to the cancellation of the minor league season. Following the 2020 season, Downs was ranked by Baseball America as the Red Sox' number two prospect.

Downs began the 2021 season in Triple-A with the Worcester Red Sox. In May, he was named to the roster of the Colombia national baseball team for the Americas Qualifying Event for the Olympics. He was selected to play in the mid-season All-Star Futures Game, where he went 1-for-2, driving in two runs with a double. In 99 games with Worcester, Downs batted .190 with 14 home runs and 39 RBIs. After the regular season, Downs was selected to play in the Arizona Fall League. On November 19, in advance of the Rule 5 draft, the Red Sox added Downs to their 40-man roster.

Downs began the 2022 season with Worcester. He was added to Boston's major-league active roster on June 20, despite only batting .180 in 53 games for Worcester. Downs made his MLB debut two nights later, playing third base and going 0-for-4 at the plate against the Detroit Tigers at Fenway Park. He was optioned back to Triple-A the next day. Downs was recalled to Boston on July 9, when Christian Arroyo was placed on the injured list. That evening, Downs collected his first MLB hit and RBI, and then scored the winning run in the bottom of the 10th inning against the New York Yankees. He hit his first major league home run on July 17 at Yankee Stadium. Downs was optioned back to Worcester on July 30, when Arroyo rejoined the team. In 14 games for the 2022 Red Sox, Downs batted .154 with one home run and four RBIs. In 81 Triple-A games with Worcester, he batted .197 with 16 home runs and 33 RBIs.

Downs was designated for assignment by the Red Sox on December 15, 2022.

=== Washington Nationals ===
The Washington Nationals claimed Downs off of waivers on December 22, 2022. Downs was optioned to the Triple-A Rochester Red Wings to begin the 2023 season. He appeared in six games for Washington, going 2–for–5 (.400) with one RBI, two stolen bases, and four walks. His lone RBI came on a walk-off single against the Oakland A's on August 13 to cap a ninth-inning comeback from a 7–2 deficit. On December 12, Downs was designated for assignment by the Nationals.

=== New York Yankees ===
On December 19, 2023, the New York Yankees claimed Downs off waivers. One month later, he was designated for assignment to make room for Diego Castillo on the 40-man roster. He cleared waivers on January 24 and was sent outright to the Triple–A Scranton/Wilkes-Barre RailRiders. He was released by Yankees organization on July 30.

=== Fukuoka SoftBank Hawks ===
On July 30, 2024, Downs signed with the Fukuoka SoftBank Hawks of Nippon Professional Baseball. He played in seven games down the stretch for the team, going 6-for-22 (.273) with one home run, two RBI, and one stolen base.

Downs made 50 appearances for Fukuoka in 2025, slashing .226/.315/.418 with four home runs, 18 RBI, and four stolen bases. With the Hawks, Downs won the 2025 Japan Series.

In 2026, Downs returned for a third season with Fukuoka where he won his second straight Japan Series, he became a free agent following the season.

== International eligibility ==
Downs represented Colombia at the qualifiers for the 2020 Summer Olympics, which were delayed to 2021 due to the COVID-19 pandemic. He went 1-for-10 with a home run, and Colombia ultimately did not qualify for the tournament.

Along with Colombia, Downs is eligible to represent Nicaragua in international competition through his father, who was born in Nicaragua but emigrated to San Andres during the Nicaraguan Revolution. Downs was included on several hypothetical rosters for Nicaragua at the 2026 World Baseball Classic, but eventually committed to representing Colombia. However, due to insurance complications, he did not join Colombia's roster and instead represented Nicaragua.

== Personal life ==
Downs' brother, Jerry Jr., played several years in Minor League Baseball.
