= Carpometacarpal bossing =

Immovable mass of bone on the wrist

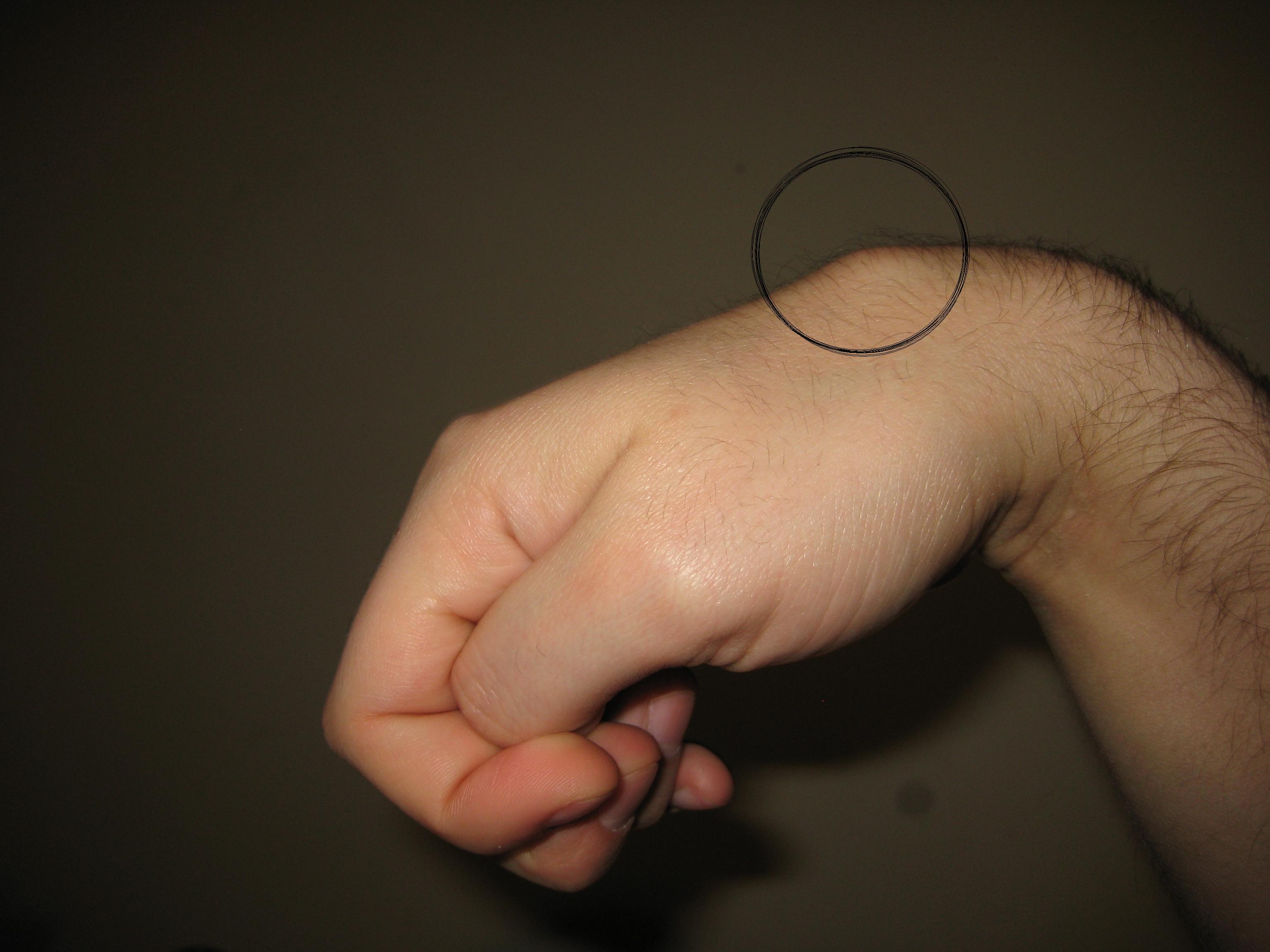
Visible growth caused by carpometacarpal bossing.

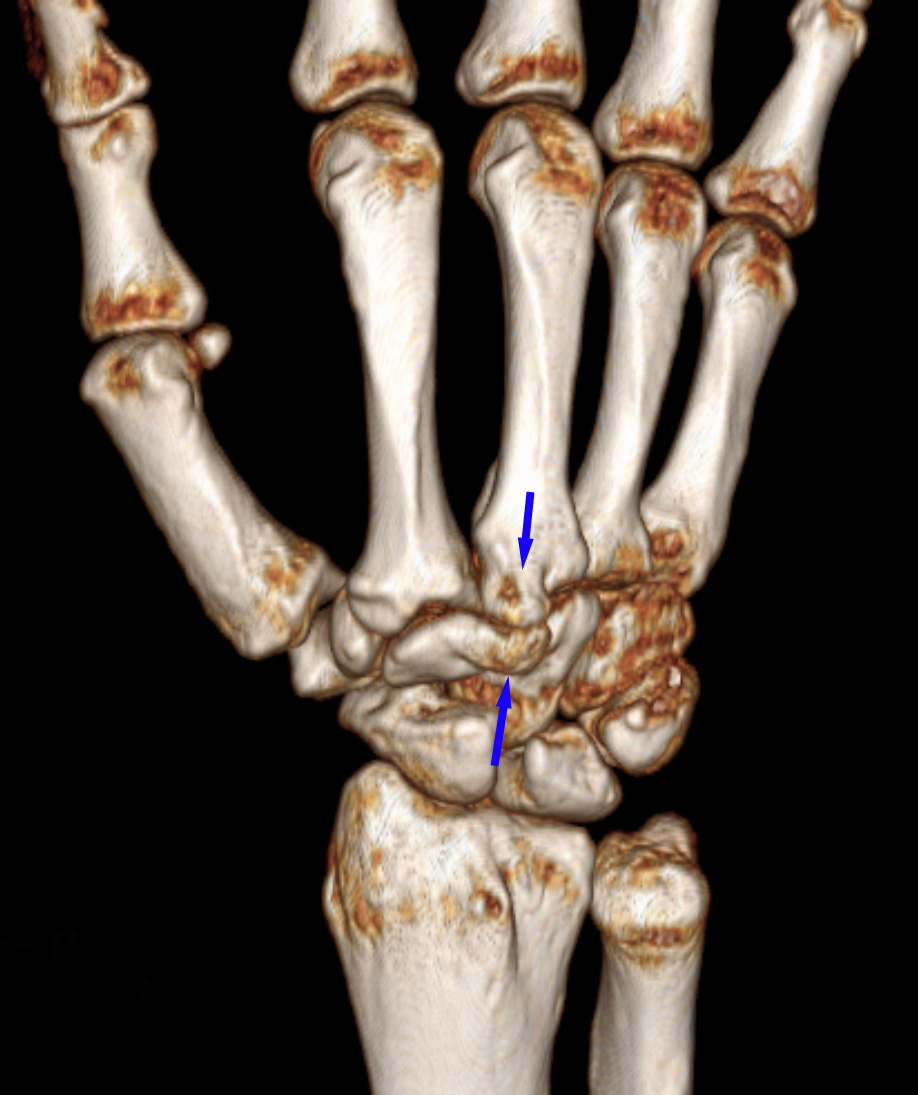
Carpal boss VR-3D-Reconstruction

Carpometacarpal bossing (or metacarpal/carpal bossing) is a small, immovable mass of bone on the back of the wrist. The mass occurs in one of the joints between the carpus and metacarpus of the hand, called the carpometacarpal joints, where a small immovable protuberance occurs when this joint becomes swollen or bossed.

The joint between the index metacarpal and the capitate is a fibrous non-mobile joint. Some people have a gene that leads to this growth. It looks like arthritis (bone spurs on each side of the joint) on X-ray. It looks like a ganglion on the hand, but more towards the fingertips.

== Clinical significance ==
The carpometacarpal joint is usually found at the base of the second and third metacarpal bones at the point where they meet the small bones of the wrist.

Bosses are usually painless and will never cause more than a slight ache. They tend to be of manageable size, but on occasion the extensor tendons can slide over the bump, which can be annoying. Sometimes there is a ganglion cyst along with the boss.

Often, this condition will be mistaken for a ganglion cyst because of its location and external appearance.

Carpometacarpal boss is uncommon and there is not much scientific data. Its etiology has yet to be fully defined, but can be congenital in the form of an accessory ossicle (os styloideum) or may be acquired from trauma, repetitive use, or degenerative osteophytosis. The condition usually begins to show in the 3rd or 4th decade.

== Additional images ==
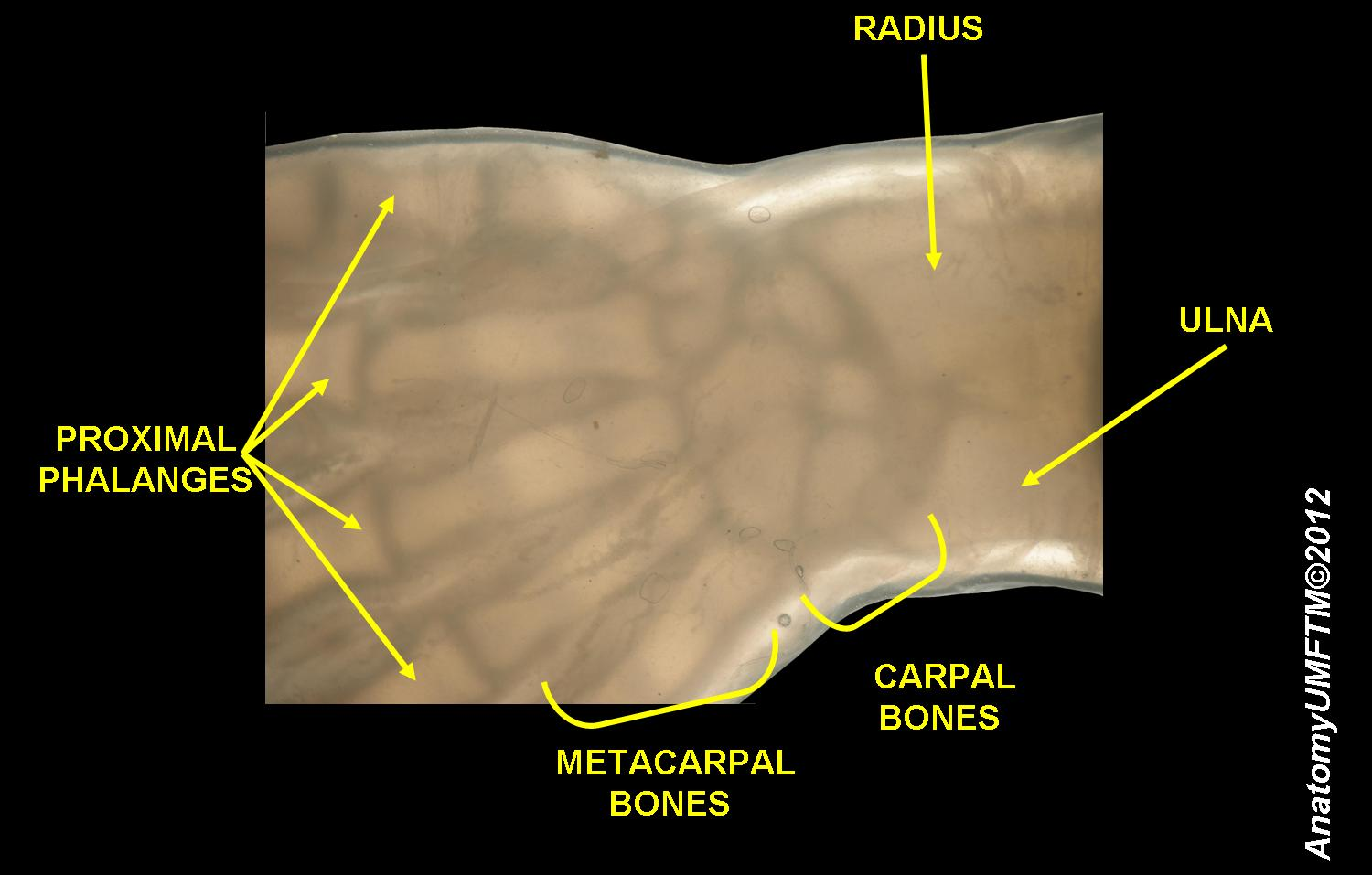
Micro-radiography of 8 weeks human embryo hand

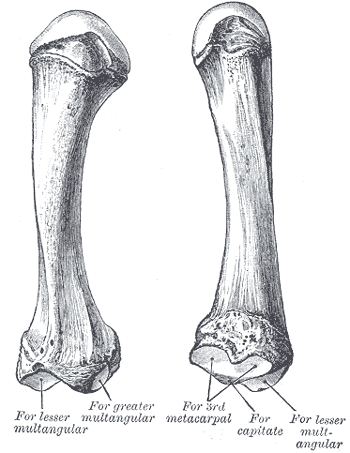
Second metacarpal bone

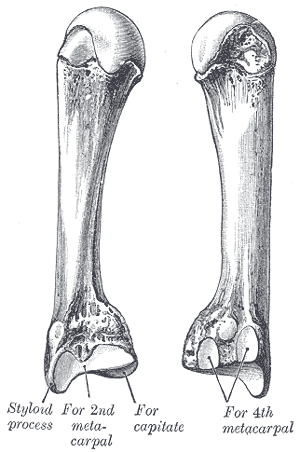
Third metacarpal bone

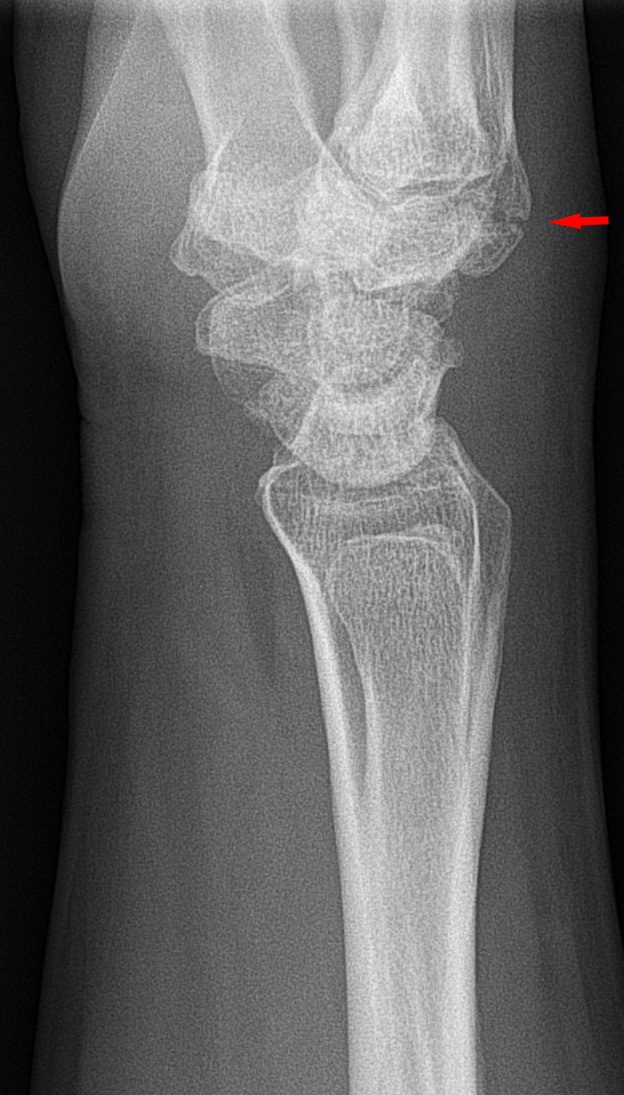
Carpal boss in plain X-Ray.

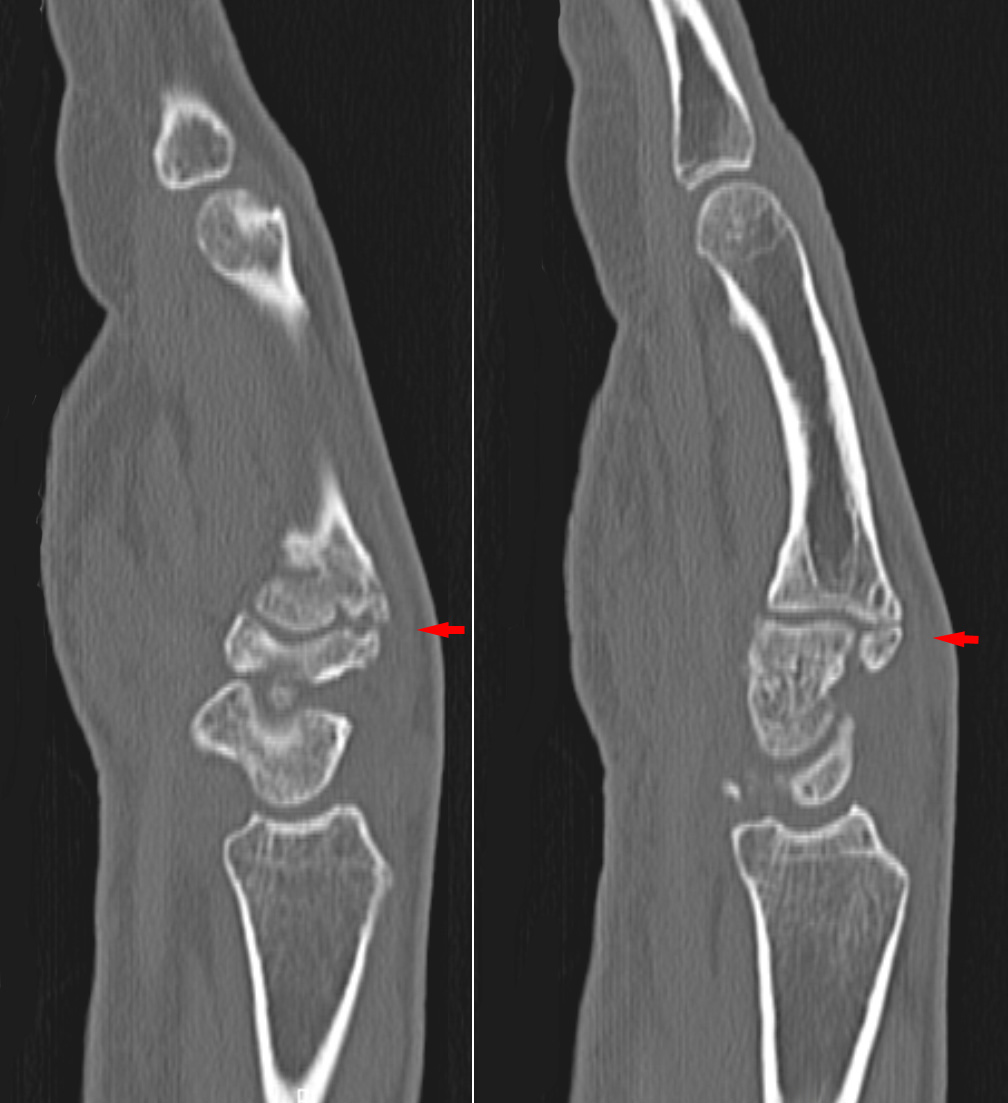
Carpal boss in CT.
