= 2022 Baltimore Orioles season =

Major League Baseball season

2022 Baltimore Orioles
- League: American League
- Division: East
- Ballpark: Oriole Park at Camden Yards
- City: Baltimore, Maryland
- Record: 83–79 (.512)
- Divisional place: 4th
- Owners: Peter Angelos
- General managers: Mike Elias
- Managers: Brandon Hyde
- Television: MASN (Kevin Brown, Scott Garceau, Geoff Arnold, Melanie Newman, Jim Palmer, Ben McDonald, Dave Johnson)
- Radio: WBAL-AM; Baltimore Orioles Radio Network (Geoff Arnold, Scott Garceau, Brett Hollander, Melanie Newman)

The 2022 Baltimore Orioles season was the 122nd season in Baltimore Orioles franchise history, the 69th in Baltimore, and the 31st at Oriole Park at Camden Yards. They finished fourth in the AL East with an 83–79 record, but missed the playoffs for the sixth straight year.

This season represented a tremendous breakthrough for the franchise. After losing 100 games in three of the last four seasons (Including two 110 loss seasons in 2018 and in the previous season), the Orioles pieced together their best single season turnaround in decades, winning 31 more games than in their previous season and represented the team's first winning campaign since 2016.

Their 31-game improvement is their largest in a single season since 1989, where the Orioles themselves improved by 33 games from their 54–107 record in 1988. Coincidentally, both improvements came the year after seasons that involved losing streaks of 19 or more losses.

== Offseason ==
=== Lockout ===
The expiration of the league's collective bargaining agreement (CBA) with the Major League Baseball Players Association occurred on December 1, 2021, with no new agreement in place. As a result, the team owners voted unanimously to lockout the players stopping all free agency and trades.

The parties came to an agreement on a new CBA on March 10, 2022. The season was delayed to begin on April 7, 2022, a week later than the original start time.

=== Rule changes ===
Pursuant to the new CBA, several new rules were instituted for the 2022 season. The National League will adopt the designated hitter full-time, a draft lottery will be implemented, the postseason will expand from ten teams to twelve, and advertising patches will appear on player uniforms and helmets for the first time.

== Regular season standings ==
=== American League East ===
AL East
Team	W	L	Pct.	GB	Home	Road
New York Yankees	99	63	.611	—	57‍–‍24	42‍–‍39
Toronto Blue Jays	92	70	.568	7	47‍–‍34	45‍–‍36
Tampa Bay Rays	86	76	.531	13	51‍–‍30	35‍–‍46
Baltimore Orioles	83	79	.512	16	45‍–‍36	38‍–‍43
Boston Red Sox	78	84	.481	21	43‍–‍38	35‍–‍46

=== American League Wild Card ===
Division leaders
Team	W	L	Pct.
Houston Astros	106	56	.654
New York Yankees	99	63	.611
Cleveland Guardians	92	70	.568

Wild Card teams (Top 3 teams qualify for postseason)
Team	W	L	Pct.	GB
Toronto Blue Jays	92	70	.568	+6
Seattle Mariners	90	72	.556	+4
Tampa Bay Rays	86	76	.531	—
Baltimore Orioles	83	79	.512	3
Chicago White Sox	81	81	.500	5
Minnesota Twins	78	84	.481	8
Boston Red Sox	78	84	.481	8
Los Angeles Angels	73	89	.451	13
Texas Rangers	68	94	.420	18
Detroit Tigers	66	96	.407	20
Kansas City Royals	65	97	.401	21
Oakland Athletics	60	102	.370	26

=== Record vs. opponents ===
2022 American League record Source: MLB Standings Grid – 2022
Team	BAL	BOS	CWS	CLE	DET	HOU	KC	LAA	MIN	NYY	OAK	SEA	TB	TEX	TOR	NL
Baltimore	—	9–10	5–2	3–3	1–5	4–3	4–3	6–1	3–4	7–12	3–4	2–4	9–10	6–0	9–10	12–8
Boston	10–9	—	2–4	5–2	5–1	4–2	3–4	4–3	3–4	6–13	5–1	6–1	7–12	6–1	3–16	9–11
Chicago	2–5	4–2	—	7–12	12–7	3–4	9–10	3–4	9–10	3–4	5–2	4–2	4–2	3–4	2–4	11–9
Cleveland	3–3	2–5	12–7	—	10–9	3–4	12–7	3–4	13–6	1–5	6–1	1–6	4–2	5–1	5–2	12–8
Detroit	5–1	1–5	7–12	9–10	—	0–7	10–9	3–3	8–11	1–5	2–5	1–6	2–5	4–3	2–5	11–9
Houston	3–4	2–4	4–3	4–3	7–0	—	5–2	13–6	6–0	5–2	12–7	12–7	5–1	14–5	2–4	12–8
Kansas City	3–4	4–3	10–9	7–12	9–10	2–5	—	3–3	7–12	1–6	3–3	2–4	3–4	2–4	2–5	7–13
Los Angeles	1–6	3–4	4–3	4–3	3–3	6–13	3–3	—	4–2	2–4	12–7	10–9	2–5	9–10	3–4	7–13
Minnesota	4–3	4–3	10–9	6–13	11–8	0–6	12–7	2–4	—	2–5	5–1	4–3	4–2	2–5	4–3	8–12
New York	12–7	13–6	4–3	5–1	5–1	2–5	6–1	4–2	5–2	—	5–2	2–4	11–8	4–3	11–8	10–10
Oakland	4–3	1–5	2–5	1–6	5–2	7–12	3–3	7–12	1–5	2–5	—	8–11	3–4	8–11	3–3	5–15
Seattle	4–2	1–6	2–4	6–1	6–1	7–12	4–2	9–10	3–4	4–2	11–8	—	2–5	14–5	5–2	12–8
Tampa Bay	10–9	12–7	2–4	2–4	5–2	1–5	4–3	5–2	2–4	8–11	4–3	5–2	—	4–3	10–9	12–8
Texas	0–6	1–6	4–3	1–5	3–4	5–14	4–2	10–9	5–2	3–4	11–8	5–14	3–4	—	2–4	11–9
Toronto	10–9	16–3	4–2	2–5	5–2	4–2	5–2	4–3	3–4	8–11	3–3	2–5	9–10	4–2	—	13–7

Updated with the results of all games through October 5, 2022.

== Game log ==
Past games legend
Orioles Win (#bfb)	Orioles Loss (#fbb)	Game postponed (#bbb)	Clinched Playoff Berth (#039)	Eliminated from playoff contention (#933) -->
Bold denotes an Orioles pitcher

Future Games Legend
Home Game	Away Game

2022 Game Log: 83–79 (Home: 45–36; Away: 38–43)
April: 7–14 (Home: 4–4; Away: 3–10)

#	Date	Opponent	Score	Win	Loss	Save	Attendance	Record	Streak/ Box
1	April 8	@ Rays	1–2	Kittredge (1–0)	**López** (0–1)	Raley (1)	25,025	0–1	L1
2	April 9	@ Rays	3–5	Fleming (1–0)	**Lyles** (0–1)	Kittredge (1)	15,615	0–2	L2
3	April 10	@ Rays	0–8	Springs (1–0)	**Wells** (0–1)	—	14,100	0–3	L3
4	April 11	Brewers	2–0	**Baumann** (1–0)	Houser (0–1)	**López** (1)	44,461	1–3	W1
5	April 12	Brewers	4–5	Milner (1–0)	**Bautista** (0–1)	Hader (2)	11,814	1–4	L1
6	April 13	Brewers	2–4	Boxberger (2–0)	**López** (0–2)	Hader (3)	12,704	1–5	L2
7	April 15	Yankees	2–1 (11)	**Krehbiel** (1–0)	Schmidt (0–2)	—	32,197	2–5	W1
8	April 16	Yankees	2–5	Sears (1–0)	**Lakins Sr.** (0–1)	Holmes (1)	28,179	2–6	L1
9	April 17	Yankees	5–0	**López** (1–1)	Loáisiga (0–1)	—	25,938	3–6	W1
10	April 18	@ Athletics	1–5	Montas (2–1)	**Krehbiel** (0–2)	—	17,503	3–7	L1
11	April 19	@ Athletics	1–2	Logue (1–0)	**Baumann** (1–1)	Jackson (1)	3,478	3–8	L2
12	April 20	@ Athletics	1–0	**Lyles** (1–1)	Jefferies (1–2)	**López** (2)	2,703	4–8	W1
13	April 21	@ Athletics	4–6	Blackburn (2–0)	**Wells** (0–2)	Jiménez (2)	4,429	4–9	L1
14	April 22	@ Angels	5–3	**Zimmermann** (1–0)	Detmers (0–1)	**López** (3)	31,679	5–9	W1
15	April 23	@ Angels	5–4	**Baker** (1–0)	Loup (0–1)	**López** (4)	43,883	6–9	W2
16	April 24	@ Angels	6–7	Herget (1–0)	**Baumann** (1–2)	Bradley (1)	41,984	6–10	L1
17	April 26	@ Yankees	8–12	Severino (2–0)	**Lyles** (1–2)	—	28,596	6–11	L2
18	April 27	@ Yankees	2–5	King (2–0)	**Krehbiel** (1–2)	Holmes (2)	31,122	6–12	L3
19	April 28	@ Yankees	5–10	Castro (2–0)	**Zimmermann** (1–1)	—	29,268	6–13	L4
20	April 29	Red Sox	1–3	Houck (2–1)	**Bradish** (0–1)	Strahm (1)	15,685	6–14	L5
21	April 30	Red Sox	2–1 (10)	**López** (2–1)	Sawamura (0–1)	—	19,927	7–14	W1

May: 14–16 (Home: 8–8; Away: 6–8)

#	Date	Opponent	Score	Win	Loss	Save	Attendance	Record	Streak/ Box
22	May 1	Red Sox	9–5	**Lyles** (2–2)	Pivetta (0–4)	—	19,117	8–14	W2
23	May 2	Twins	1–2	Paddack (1–2)	**Baker** (1–1)	Durán (1)	7,427	8–15	L1
24	May 3	Twins	2–7	Thielbar (1–0)	**Krehbiel** (1–3)	—	6,678	8–16	L2
25	May 4	Twins	9–4	**Pérez** (1–0)	Bundy (3–2)	—	7,466	9–16	W1
26	May 5	Twins	5–3	**López** (3–1)	Durán (0–1)	—	8,652	10–16	W2
—	May 6	Royals	PPD, RAIN; rescheduled for MAY 8						
—	May 7	Royals	PPD, RAIN; rescheduled for MAY 9						
27	May 8 (1)	Royals	4–6	Clarke (1–0)	**López** (3–2)	Barlow (2)	see 2nd game	10–17	L1
28	May 8 (2)	Royals	4–2	**Zimmermann** (2–1)	Lynch (2–2)	**Tate** (1)	19,893	11–17	W1
29	May 9	Royals	6–1	**Wells** (1–2)	Hernández (0–2)	—	9,438	12–17	W2
30	May 10	@ Cardinals	5–3	**Bradish** (1–1)	Naughton (0–1)	**Bautista** (1)	33,649	13–17	W3
31	May 11	@ Cardinals	1–10	Mikolas (3–1)	**Watkins** (0–1)	—	34,533	13–18	L1
32	May 12	@ Cardinals	3–2	**Akin** (1–0)	Matz (3–3)	**Bautista** (2)	35,198	14–18	W1
33	May 13	@ Tigers	2–4	Rodríguez (1–2)	**Lyles** (2–3)	Vest (1)	23,941	14–19	L1
34	May 14	@ Tigers	0–3	Peralta (1–0)	**Zimmermann** (2–2)	Soto (5)	28,016	14–20	L2
35	May 15	@ Tigers	1–5	Skubal (3–2)	**Wells** (1–3)	—	20,080	14–21	L3
36	May 16	Yankees	2–6	Severino (3–0)	**Bradish** (1–2)	—	12,228	14–22	L4
37	May 17	Yankees	4–5	Taillon (4–1)	**Tate** (0–2)	Chapman (9)	12,635	14–23	L5
38	May 18	Yankees	2–3	Cole (4–0)	**Lyles** (2–4)	Holmes (3)	13,850	14–24	L6
39	May 19	Yankees	9–6	**Bautista** (1–1)	Luetge (1–1)	—	23,819	15–24	W1
40	May 20	Rays	8–6 (13)	**Vespi** (1–0)	Garza Jr. (0–1)	—	15,127	16–24	W2
41	May 21	Rays	1–6	Springs (2–1)	**Bradish** (1–3)	—	17,573	16–25	L1
42	May 22	Rays	7–6 (11)	**Pérez** (2–0)	Knight (0–1)	—	23,778	17–25	W1
43	May 23	@ Yankees	6–4	**Lyles** (3–4)	Cole (4–1)	**López** (5)	32,187	18–25	W2
44	May 24	@ Yankees	6–7 (10)	Schmidt (3–2)	**Baker** (1–2)	—	32,289	18–26	L1
45	May 25	@ Yankees	0–2	Sears (2–0)	**Wells** (1–4)	Holmes (5)	39,154	18–27	L2
46	May 27	@ Red Sox	12–8	**Pérez** (3–0)	Strahm (2–2)	—	29,251	19–27	W1
47	May 28 (1)	@ Red Sox	3–5	Eovaldi (2–2)	**Akin** (1–1)	—	26,912	19–28	L1
48	May 28 (2)	@ Red Sox	4–2	**Krehbiel** (2–3)	Winckowski (0–1)	**López** (6)	28,491	20–28	W1
49	May 29	@ Red Sox	2–12	Pivetta (4–4)	**Zimmermann** (2–3)	—	35,715	20–29	L1
50	May 30	@ Red Sox	10–0	**Wells** (2–4)	Hill (1–3)	—	24,809	21–29	W1
51	May 31	Mariners	0–10	Kirby (1–1)	**Baker** (1–3)	—	8,074	21–30	L1

June: 14–12 (Home: 6–5; Away: 8–7)

#	Date	Opponent	Score	Win	Loss	Save	Attendance	Record	Streak/ Box
52	June 1	Mariners	9–2	**Pérez** (4–0)	Ray (4–6)	—	8,400	22–30	W1
53	June 2	Mariners	6–7 (10)	Castillo (2–0)	**López** (3–3)	—	8,817	22–31	L1
54	June 3	Guardians	3–6	Bieber (3–3)	**Zimmermann** (2–4)	Clase (8)	15,456	22–32	L2
55	June 4	Guardians	5–4	**Bautista** (2–1)	McKenzie (3–5)	**López** (7)	17,183	23–32	W1
56	June 5	Guardians	2–3	Plesac (2–4)	**Kremer** (0–1)	Clase (9)	14,815	23–33	L1
57	June 7	Cubs	9–3	**Baker** (2–3)	Thompson (6–1)	—	11,509	24–33	W1
—	June 8	Cubs	PPD, RAIN; rescheduled for AUG 18						
58	June 9	@ Royals	5–7	Payamps (2–1)	**Lyles** (3–5)	Barlow (6)	15,594	24–34	L1
59	June 10	@ Royals	1–8	Heasley (1–3)	**Zimmermann** (2–5)	—	17,650	24–35	L2
60	June 11	@ Royals	6–4	**Wells** (3–4)	Lynch (2–6)	**López** (8)	15,134	25–35	W1
61	June 12	@ Royals	10–7	**Kremer** (1–1)	Keller (1–8)	**Pérez** (1)	15,037	26–35	W2
62	June 13	@ Blue Jays	1–11	Manoah (8–1)	**Bradish** (1–4)	—	19,716	26–36	L1
63	June 14	@ Blue Jays	6–5	**Lyles** (4–5)	Kikuchi (2–3)	**López** (9)	23,106	27–36	W1
64	June 15	@ Blue Jays	6–7 (10)	Cimber (7–2)	**Bautista** (2–2)	—	19,961	27–37	L1
65	June 16	@ Blue Jays	10–2	**Wells** (4–4)	Gausman (5–6)	—	36,832	28–37	W1
66	June 17	Rays	1–0	**Bautista** (3–2)	Faucher (0–1)	**López** (10)	13,140	29–37	W2
67	June 18	Rays	6–7	Faucher (1–1)	**Tate** (0–3)	Poche (4)	15,426	29–38	L1
68	June 19	Rays	2–1	**Vespi** (2–0)	Kluber (3–4)	**López** (11)	23,004	30–38	W1
69	June 21	Nationals	0–3	Fedde (5–5)	**Lyles** (4–6)	Rainey (8)	19,197	30–39	L1
70	June 22	Nationals	7–0 (6)	**Wells** (5–4)	Corbin (3–10)	**Vespi** (1)	12,630	31–39	W1
71	June 23	@ White Sox	4–0	**Kremer** (2–1)	Cueto (1–4)	**López** (12)	22,431	32–39	W2
72	June 24	@ White Sox	4–1	**Krehbiel** (3–3)	Kopech (2–4)	**López** (13)	27,943	33–39	W3
73	June 25	@ White Sox	6–2	**Watkins** (1–1)	Lynn (1–1)	—	29,282	34–39	W4
74	June 26	@ White Sox	3–4	Cease (6–3)	**Lyles** (4–7)	Graveman (3)	29,191	34–40	L1
75	June 27	@ Mariners	9–2	**Wells** (6–4)	Kirby (2–3)	**Akin** (1)	21,615	35–40	W1
76	June 28	@ Mariners	0–2	Castillo (5–1)	**Pérez** (4–1)	Sewald (7)	16,024	35–41	L1
77	June 29	@ Mariners	3–9	Flexen (4–8)	**Voth** (0–1)	—	17,412	35–42	L2

July: 16–9 (Home: 11–3; Away: 5–6)

#	Date	Opponent	Score	Win	Loss	Save	Attendance	Record	Streak/ Box
78	July 1	@ Twins	2–3	Minaya (1–0)	**López** (3–4)	—	25,540	35–43	L3
79	July 2	@ Twins	3–4	Pagán (2–3)	**López** (3–5)	—	20,618	35–44	L4
80	July 3	@ Twins	3–1	**Wells** (7–4)	Smeltzer (4–2)	**Tate** (2)	24,424	36–44	W1
81	July 4	Rangers	7–6 (10)	**Baker** (3–3)	Moore (3–1)	—	18,670	37–44	W2
82	July 5	Rangers	10–9 (10)	**Krehbiel** (4–3)	Moore (3–2)	—	7,371	38–44	W3
83	July 6	Rangers	2–1	**Watkins** (2–1)	Otto (4–5)	**López** (14)	7,648	39–44	W4
84	July 7	Angels	4–1	**Lyles** (5–7)	Silseth (1–3)	**López** (15)	13,088	40–44	W5
85	July 8	Angels	5–4	**Tate** (1–3)	Iglesias (2–5)	—	27,814	41–44	W6
86	July 9	Angels	1–0	**Kremer** (3–1)	Sandoval (3–4)	**López** (16)	32,286	42–44	W7
87	July 10	Angels	9–5	**Voth** (1–1)	Suárez (1–3)	—	19,521	43–44	W8
88	July 12	@ Cubs	4–2	**Lyles** (6–7)	Sampson (0–1)	**López** (17)	31,079	44–44	W9
89	July 13	@ Cubs	7–1	**Watkins** (3–1)	Steele (3–6)	—	29,529	45–44	W10
90	July 15	@ Rays	4–5	Wisler (3–3)	**Wells** (7–5)	Raley (6)	13,917	45–45	L1
91	July 16	@ Rays	6–4 (11)	**López** (4–5)	Bard (1–1)	**Krehbiel** (1)	19,886	46–45	W1
92	July 17	@ Rays	5–7	Kluber (6–5)	**Lyles** (6–8)	Adam (4)	13,813	46–46	L1
ASG	July 19	@ Dodger Stadium	AL @ NL	Valdez (1–0)	Gonsolin (0–1)	Clase (1)	52,518	—	N/A
93	July 22	Yankees	6–7	Luetge (3–3)	**Wells** (7–6)	Holmes (17)	28,468	46–47	L2
94	July 23	Yankees	6–3	**Pérez** (5–1)	Cole (9–3)	**López** (18)	36,361	47–47	W1
95	July 24	Yankees	0–6	Cortés Jr. (8–3)	**Kremer** (3–2)	Schmidt (1)	25,623	47–48	L1
96	July 25	Rays	5–1	**Vespi** (3–0)	Kluber (6–6)	—	9,606	48–48	W1
97	July 26	Rays	5–3	**Akin** (2–1)	Poche (2–1)	**López** (19)	11,307	49–48	W2
98	July 27	Rays	4–6 (10)	Poche (3–1)	**López** (4–6)	Fairbanks (1)	13,592	49–49	L1
99	July 28	Rays	3–0	**Lyles** (7–8)	Yarbrough (0–6)	**Bautista** (3)	16,784	50–49	W1
100	July 29	@ Reds	6–2	**Tate** (2–3)	Farmer (0–1)	—	23,658	51–49	W2
101	July 30	@ Reds	2–8	Mahle (5–7)	**Kremer** (3–3)	—	29,104	51–50	L1
102	July 31	@ Reds	2–3	Díaz (3–1)	**Bautista** (3–3)	Farmer (1)	20,496	51–51	L2

August: 17–10 (Home: 8–4; Away: 9–6)

#	Date	Opponent	Score	Win	Loss	Save	Attendance	Record	Streak/ Box
103	August 1	@ Rangers	7–2	**Watkins** (4–1)	Gray (7–6)	**Akin** (2)	19,161	52–51	W1
104	August 2	@ Rangers	8–2	**Lyles** (8–8)	Howard (2–3)	—	21,622	53–51	W2
105	August 3	@ Rangers	6–3	**Pérez** (6–1)	Leclerc (0–1)	—	20,221	54–51	W3
106	August 5	Pirates	1–0	**Kremer** (4–3)	Keller (3–8)	**Bautista** (4)	25,613	55–51	W4
107	August 6	Pirates	6–3	**Voth** (2–1)	Brubaker (2–10)	—	41,086	56–51	W5
108	August 7	Pirates	1–8	Wilson (2–6)	**Watkins** (4–2)	—	16,714	56–52	L1
109	August 8	Blue Jays	7–4	**Lyles** (9–8)	Kikuchi (4–6)	**Bautista** (5)	12,671	57–52	W1
110	August 9	Blue Jays	6–5	**Vespi** (4–0)	García (1–4)	**Bautista** (6)	11,080	58–52	W2
—	August 10	Blue Jays	PPD, RAIN; rescheduled for SEPT 5						
111	August 11	@ Red Sox	3–4	Davis (2–1)	**Kremer** (4–4)	Schreiber (4)	33,927	58–53	L1
112	August 12	@ Rays	10–3	**Voth** (3–1)	Kluber (7–7)	—	12,380	59–53	W1
113	August 13	@ Rays	2–8	McClanahan (11–5)	**Hall** (0–1)	—	16,823	59–54	L1
114	August 14	@ Rays	1–4	Rasmussen (7–4)	**Lyles** (9–9)	Adam (6)	18,093	59–55	L2
115	August 15	@ Blue Jays	7–3	**Baker** (4–3)	Kikuchi (4–7)	—	26,769	60–55	W1
116	August 16	@ Blue Jays	4–2	**Kremer** (5–4)	Manoah (12–6)	**Bautista** (7)	37,940	61–55	W2
117	August 17	@ Blue Jays	1–6	García (2–4)	**Krehbiel** (4–4)	—	40,141	61–56	L1
118	August 18	Cubs	2–3	Sampson (1–3)	**Watkins** (4–3)	Hughes (1)	19,454	61–57	L2
119	August 19	Red Sox	15–10	**Vespi** (5–0)	Crawford (5–3)	—	33,136	62–57	W1
120	August 20	Red Sox	3–4	Wacha (8–1)	**Bradish** (1–5)	Whitlock (5)	34,939	62–58	L1
121	August 21	Red Sox (Note: @ Muncy Bank Ballpark at Historic Bowman Field in Williamsport, PA)	5–3	**Pérez** (7–1)	Barnes (0–4)	**Bautista** (8)	2,467	63–58	W1
122	August 23	White Sox	5–3	**Voth** (4–1)	Cease (12–6)	**Bautista** (9)	12,954	64–58	W2
123	August 24	White Sox	3–5	Giolito (10–7)	**Watkins** (4–4)	—	12,565	64–59	L1
124	August 25	White Sox	4–3 (11)	**Bautista** (4–3)	Diekman (5–3)	—	13,905	65–59	W1
125	August 26	@ Astros	2–0	**Bradish** (2–5)	Javier (7–9)	**Tate** (3)	31,035	66–59	W2
126	August 27	@ Astros	3–1	**Kremer** (6–4)	Urquidy (12–5)	**Bautista** (10)	34,526	67–59	W3
127	August 28	@ Astros	1–3	Stanek (2–1)	**Voth** (4–2)	Montero (9)	31,559	67–60	L1
128	August 30	@ Guardians	1–5	Quantrill (11–5)	**Watkins** (4–5)	—	12,492	67–61	L2
129	August 31	@ Guardians	4–0	**Lyles** (10–9)	McKenzie (9–11)	—	12,221	68–61	W1

September: 13–15 (Home: 7–10; Away: 6–5)

#	Date	Opponent	Score	Win	Loss	Save	Attendance	Record	Streak/ Box
130	September 1	@ Guardians	3–0	**Bradish** (3–5)	Bieber (8–8)	**Bautista** (11)	11,827	69–61	W2
131	September 2	Athletics	5–2	**Tate** (3–3)	Acevedo (3–3)	—	13,558	70–61	W3
132	September 3	Athletics	8–1	**Akin** (3–1)	Oller (2–7)	—	30,853	71–61	W4
133	September 4	Athletics	0–5	Martínez (4–3)	**Watkins** (4–6)	—	19,883	71–62	L1
134	September 5 (1)	Blue Jays	3–7	Gausman (11–9)	**Baumann** (1–3)	—	see 2nd game	71–63	L2
135	September 5 (2)	Blue Jays	4–8	Berríos (10–5)	**Akin** (3–2)	—	25,451	71–64	L3
136	September 6	Blue Jays	9–6	**Tate** (4–3)	White (1–6)	**Bautista** (12)	8,411	72–64	W1
137	September 7	Blue Jays	1–4	Manoah (14–7)	**Kremer** (6–5)	Romano (31)	11,488	72–65	L1
138	September 9	Red Sox	3–2	**Reed** (2–0)	Bello (1–5)	**Tate** (4)	16,451	73–65	W1
139	September 10	Red Sox	4–17	Wacha (11–1)	**Lyles** (10–10)	—	26,050	73–66	L1
140	September 11	Red Sox	0–1	Hill (7–6)	**Bradish** (3–6)	Barnes (5)	16,030	73–67	L2
141	September 13	@ Nationals	4–3	**Kremer** (7–5)	Harvey (1–1)	**Bautista** (13)	31,679	74–67	W1
142	September 14	@ Nationals	6–2	**Voth** (5–2)	Thompson (1–1)	—	32,497	75–67	W2
143	September 16	@ Blue Jays	3–6	Kikuchi (5–7)	**Lyles** (10–11)	—	36,573	75–68	L1
144	September 17	@ Blue Jays	3–6	Berríos (11–5)	**Bradish** (3–7)	Romano (34)	44,448	75–69	L2
145	September 18	@ Blue Jays	5–4	**Krehbiel** (5–4)	Romano (5–4)	**Bautista** (14)	41,301	76–69	W1
146	September 19	Tigers	0–11	Alexander (4–10)	**Wells** (7–7)	—	10,201	76–70	L1
147	September 20	Tigers	2–3	Wentz (2–2)	**Voth** (5–3)	Soto (26)	9,582	76–71	L2
148	September 21	Tigers	8–1	**Lyles** (11–11)	Manning (2–3)	—	9,314	77–71	W1
149	September 22	Astros	2–0	**Bradish** (4–7)	Verlander (17–4)	**Bautista** (15)	16,417	78–71	W2
150	September 23	Astros	6–0	**Kremer** (8–5)	Urquidy (13–8)	—	22,833	79–71	W3
151	September 24	Astros	10–11	Montero (5–2)	**Bautista** (4–4)	Pressly (31)	22,546	79–72	L1
152	September 25	Astros	3–6 (11)	Neris (6–4)	**Akin** (3–3)	—	24,449	79–73	L2
153	September 26	@ Red Sox	14–8	**Watkins** (5–6)	Seabold (0–4)	—	25,634	80–73	W1
154	September 27	@ Red Sox	9–13	Strahm (4–4)	**Krehbiel** (5–5)	—	30,765	80–74	L1
155	September 28	@ Red Sox	1–3	Hill (8–7)	**Kremer** (8–6)	Barnes (6)	33,073	80–75	L2
156	September 29	@ Red Sox	3–5	Kelly (1–0)	**Tate** (4–4)	Ort (1)	29,779	80–76	L3
157	September 30	@ Yankees	2–1	**Lyles** (12–11)	Germán (2–4)	**Hall** (1)	47,583	81–76	W1

October: 2–3 (Home: 1–2; Away: 1–1)

#	Date	Opponent	Score	Win	Loss	Save	Attendance	Record	Streak/ Box
158	October 1	@ Yankees	0–8	Cortés Jr. (12–4)	**Voth** (5–4)	—	45,248	81–77	L1
159	October 2	@ Yankees	3–1	**Gillaspie** (1–0)	Chapman (3–4)	**Tate** (5)	44,332	82–77	W1
160	October 3	Blue Jays	1–5 (8)	Berríos (12–7)	**Kremer** (8–7)	Mayza (2)	10,642	82–78	L1
—	October 4	Blue Jays	PPD, RAIN; rescheduled for OCT 5						
161	October 5 (1)	Blue Jays	5–4	**Hall** (1–1)	White (1–7)	**Baker** (1)	see 2nd game	83–78	W1
162	October 5 (2)	Blue Jays	1–5	Kikuchi (6–7)	**Canó** (1–1)	—	17,248	83–79	L1

== Roster ==
2022 Baltimore Orioles
Roster
Pitchers: 45 Keegan Akin; 61 Logan Allen; 43 Bryan Baker; 53 Mike Baumann; 74 Félix Bautista; 56 Kyle Bradish; 78 Yennier Canó; 78 Marcos Diplán; 39 Chris Ellis; 51 Paul Fry; 63 Rico Garcia; 71 Logan Gillaspie; 49 DL Hall; 60 Louis Head; 34,87 Joey Krehbiel; 64 Dean Kremer; 54 Travis Lakins Sr.; 48 Jorge López; 59 Zac Lowther; 28 Jordan Lyles; 47 John Means; 58 Cionel Pérez; 61 Jake Reed; 81 Denyi Reyes; 73 Cody Sedlock; 67 Beau Sulser; 55 Dillon Tate; 79 Nick Vespi; 51 Austin Voth; 80 Spenser Watkins; 52 Alexander Wells; 68 Tyler Wells; 50 Bruce Zimmermann	Catchers: 37 Anthony Bemboom; 23 Robinson Chirinos; 35 Adley Rutschman; Infielders: 99 Jesús Aguilar; 76 Jonathan Araúz; 65 Rylan Bannon; 82 Kelvin Gutiérrez; 2 Gunnar Henderson; 16 Trey Mancini; 1 Richie Martin; 3 Jorge Mateo; 41 Tyler Nevin; 6 Ryan Mountcastle; 12 Rougned Odor; 11 Chris Owings; 29 Ramón Urías; 77 Terrin Vavra	Outfielders: 84 Yusniel Díaz; 21 Austin Hays; 26 Ryan McKenna; 31 Cedric Mullins; 66 Brett Phillips; 25 Anthony Santander; 83 Kyle Stowers; Other batters: 24 D. J. Stewart	Manager: 18 Brandon Hyde; Coaches: 62 Matt Borgschulte (hitting); 88 Ben Carhart (bullpen catcher); 70 Tim Cossins (field coordinator); 72 Ryan Fuller (hitting); 57 Fredi González (bench); 27 José Hernández (coach); 40 Darren Holmes (assistant pitching); 38 Chris Holt (pitching); 36 Tony Mansolino (third base); 93 Joel Polanco (bullpen catcher); 9 Anthony Sanders (first base)

== Orioles team leaders ==
Batting
Batting average†	Cedric Mullins	.258
Runs scored	Cedric Mullins	89
RBIs	Anthony Santander	89
Home runs	Anthony Santander	33
Stolen bases	Jorge Mateo	35
Pitching
ERA‡	Jordan Lyles	4.42
WHIP‡	Jordan Lyles	1.39
Wins	Jordan Lyles	12
Strikeouts	Jordan Lyles	144
Saves	Jorge López	19

Updated through games of October 5.
† Minimum 3.1 plate appearances per team games played
AVG qualified batters: Hays, Mateo, Mountcastle, Mullins, Santander
‡ Minimum 1 inning pitched per team games played
ERA & WHIP qualified pitchers: Lyles

== Player stats ==
= Indicates team leader

= Indicates league leader

=== Batting ===
Note: G = Games played; AB = At bats; R = Runs; H = Hits; 2B = Doubles; 3B = Triples; HR = Home runs; RBI = Runs batted in; SB = Stolen bases; AVG = Batting average; SLG = Slugging average

Player	G	AB	R	H	2B	3B	HR	RBI	SB	BB	AVG	SLG
Cedric Mullins	156	608	89	157	32	4	16	64	34	47	.258	.403
Anthony Santander	152	574	78	138	24	0	33	89	0	55	.240	.455
Ryan Mountcastle	145	555	62	139	28	1	22	85	4	43	.250	.423
Austin Hays	145	535	66	134	35	2	16	60	2	34	.250	.413
Jorge Mateo	150	494	63	109	25	7	13	50	35	27	.221	.379
Rougned Odor	135	426	49	88	19	3	13	53	6	32	.207	.357
Ramón Urías	118	403	50	100	17	1	16	51	1	30	.248	.414
Adley Rutschman	113	398	70	101	35	1	13	42	4	65	.254	.445
Trey Mancini	92	354	39	95	16	1	10	41	0	35	.268	.404
Robinson Chirinos	67	195	10	35	9	0	4	22	1	19	.179	.287
Tyler Nevin	58	157	17	31	4	0	2	16	0	20	.197	.261
Ryan McKenna	104	156	23	37	10	0	2	11	2	11	.237	.340
Gunnar Henderson	34	116	12	30	7	1	4	18	1	16	.259	.440
Kyle Stowers	34	91	11	23	4	1	3	11	0	5	.253	.418
Terrin Vavra	40	89	14	23	2	1	1	12	0	12	.258	.337
Chris Owings	26	56	6	6	2	0	0	0	1	10	.107	.143
Anthony Bemboom	22	52	4	6	2	0	1	1	0	6	.115	.212
Jesús Aguilar	16	49	2	11	1	0	1	2	0	1	.224	.306
Richie Martin	13	30	4	5	0	2	0	3	3	3	.167	.300
Kelvin Gutiérrez	12	28	2	4	1	0	0	3	1	4	.143	.179
Jonathan Araúz	9	28	2	5	0	0	1	4	0	1	.179	.286
Brett Phillips	8	17	1	2	2	0	0	1	0	0	.118	.235
Rylan Bannon	4	14	0	2	0	0	0	0	0	0	.143	.143
DJ Stewart	3	3	0	0	0	0	0	0	0	0	.000	.000
Yusniel Díaz	1	1	0	0	0	0	0	0	0	0	.000	.000
Team totals	162	5429	674	1281	275	25	171	639	95	476	.236	.390

=== Pitching ===
Note: W = Wins; L = Losses; ERA = Earned run average; G = Games pitched; GS = Games started; SV = Saves; IP = Innings pitched; H = Hits allowed; R = Runs allowed; ER = Earned runs allowed; BB = Walks allowed; SO = Strikeouts

Player	W	L	ERA	G	GS	SV	IP	H	R	ER	BB	SO
Jordan Lyles	12	11	4.42	32	32	0	179.0	196	94	88	52	144
Dean Kremer	8	7	3.23	22	21	0	125.1	123	48	45	34	87
Kyle Bradish	4	7	4.90	23	23	0	117.2	119	68	64	46	111
Spenser Watkins	5	6	4.70	23	20	0	105.1	119	59	55	30	63
Tyler Wells	7	7	4.25	23	23	0	103.2	90	49	49	28	76
Austin Voth	5	4	3.04	22	17	0	83.0	77	30	28	25	72
Keegan Akin	3	3	3.20	45	1	2	81.2	69	35	29	20	77
Dillon Tate	4	4	3.05	67	0	5	73.2	57	29	25	16	60
Bruce Zimmermann	2	5	5.99	15	13	0	73.2	97	52	49	12	49
Bryan Baker	4	3	3.49	66	2	1	69.2	60	29	27	26	76
Félix Bautista	4	4	2.19	65	0	15	65.2	38	18	16	23	88
Cionel Pérez	7	1	1.40	66	0	1	57.2	46	11	9	21	55
Joey Krehbiel	5	5	3.90	56	0	1	57.2	53	28	25	18	45
Jorge López	4	6	1.68	44	0	19	48.1	30	15	9	17	54
Mike Baumann	1	3	4.72	13	4	0	34.1	43	19	18	9	23
Nick Vespi	5	0	4.10	25	0	1	26.1	29	12	12	8	28
Logan Gillaspie	1	0	3.12	17	0	0	17.1	20	8	6	3	10
DL Hall	1	1	5.93	11	1	1	13.2	17	9	9	6	19
Beau Sulser	0	0	3.55	6	0	0	12.2	16	5	5	3	9
Paul Fry	0	0	6.00	12	0	0	12.0	9	9	8	7	12
Travis Lakins Sr.	0	1	9.58	6	0	0	10.1	14	11	11	6	8
Rico Garcia	0	0	4.50	6	0	0	8.0	8	4	4	3	2
John Means	0	0	3.38	2	2	0	8.0	8	3	3	2	7
Denyi Reyes	0	0	2.35	3	1	0	7.2	8	2	2	1	3
Jake Reed	1	0	6.35	8	0	0	5.2	7	6	4	1	5
Marcos Diplán	0	0	1.59	5	0	0	5.2	4	2	1	5	8
Zac Lowther	0	0	8.44	1	0	0	5.1	8	6	5	2	1
Louis Head	0	0	1.80	5	0	0	5.0	6	1	1	4	3
Yennier Canó	0	1	18.69	3	0	0	4.1	9	9	9	5	7
Chris Ellis	0	0	10.38	2	2	0	4.1	5	5	5	6	2
Alexander Wells	0	0	4.91	2	0	0	3.2	5	2	2	0	6
Cody Sedlock	0	0	15.00	1	0	0	3.0	6	5	5	1	3
Logan Allen	0	0	10.80	3	0	0	1.2	3	2	2	2	1
Ryan McKenna	0	0	13.50	2	0	0	1.1	5	2	2	1	0
Chris Owings	0	0	9.00	1	0	0	1.0	2	1	1	0	0
Team totals	83	79	3.97	162	162	46	1433.1	1406	688	632	443	1214

== Farm system ==
Level	Team	League	Manager
Triple-A	Norfolk Tides	International League	Buck Britton
Double-A	Bowie Baysox	Eastern League	Kyle Moore
High-A	Aberdeen IronBirds	South Atlantic League	Roberto Mercado
Low-A	Delmarva Shorebirds	Carolina League	Dave Anderson
Rookie	FCL Orioles	Florida Complex League	Alan Mills
Foreign Rookie	DSL Orioles 1	Dominican Summer League	Elvis Morel
Foreign Rookie	DSL Orioles 2	Dominican Summer League	Chris Madera
