= Sauk Rapids-Rice High School =

- The SRRHS Storm Logo

Location
- 1835 Osauka Road; Sauk Rapids, Minnesota 56379; United States; 45.60963°N 94.1263°W

Information
- Type: Public
- Motto: "Committed to Excellence"
- Established: 1908; New building opened in 2003
- School district: I.S.D. #47
- Principal: Sandy Logrono (Interim)
- Staff: 75.09 (FTE)
- Grades: 9–12
- Student to teacher ratio: 17.54
- Colors: Green and Gold
- Mascot: Bolt
- Website: srrhs.isd47.org

Sauk Rapids-Rice High School, often abbreviated SRRHS, is a high school located in Sauk Rapids, Minnesota, United States. The school year at SRRHS is a semester system consisting of seven-period days.

== Sports programs ==
The sports offered are listed below:

- Baseball
- Basketball (boys)
- Basketball (girls)
- Cross country (boys)
- Cross country (girls)
- Dance team
- Football
- Golf (boys)
- Golf (girls)
- Gymnastics
- Hockey (boys)
- Hockey (girls)
- Soccer (boys)
- Soccer (girls)
- Softball
- Swimming/diving (boys)
- Swimming/diving (girls)
- Tennis (boys)
- Tennis (girls)
- Track and field (boys)
- Track and field (girls)
- Volleyball
- Wrestling

l

== College level courses ==
Advanced placement courses offered are as follows:

- AP Calculus
- AP Spanish Language and Culture
- AP United States Government and Politics
- AP Psychology
- AP Statistics
- AP English Literature and Composition
- AP United States History

College in the classroom courses offered through SCSU are as follows:

- Chemistry
- Physics
- Pre-calculus and discrete mathematics (PDM)
- Accelerated functions, statistics and trigonometry (FST)

== Notable alumni ==
- Anthony Bemboom, baseball player
- Ethan Prow, professional hockey player

== Resources ==
1. SRRHS Fast Facts
2. SRRHS Great Schools Profile
