= Tony Campana =

American baseball player (born 1986)

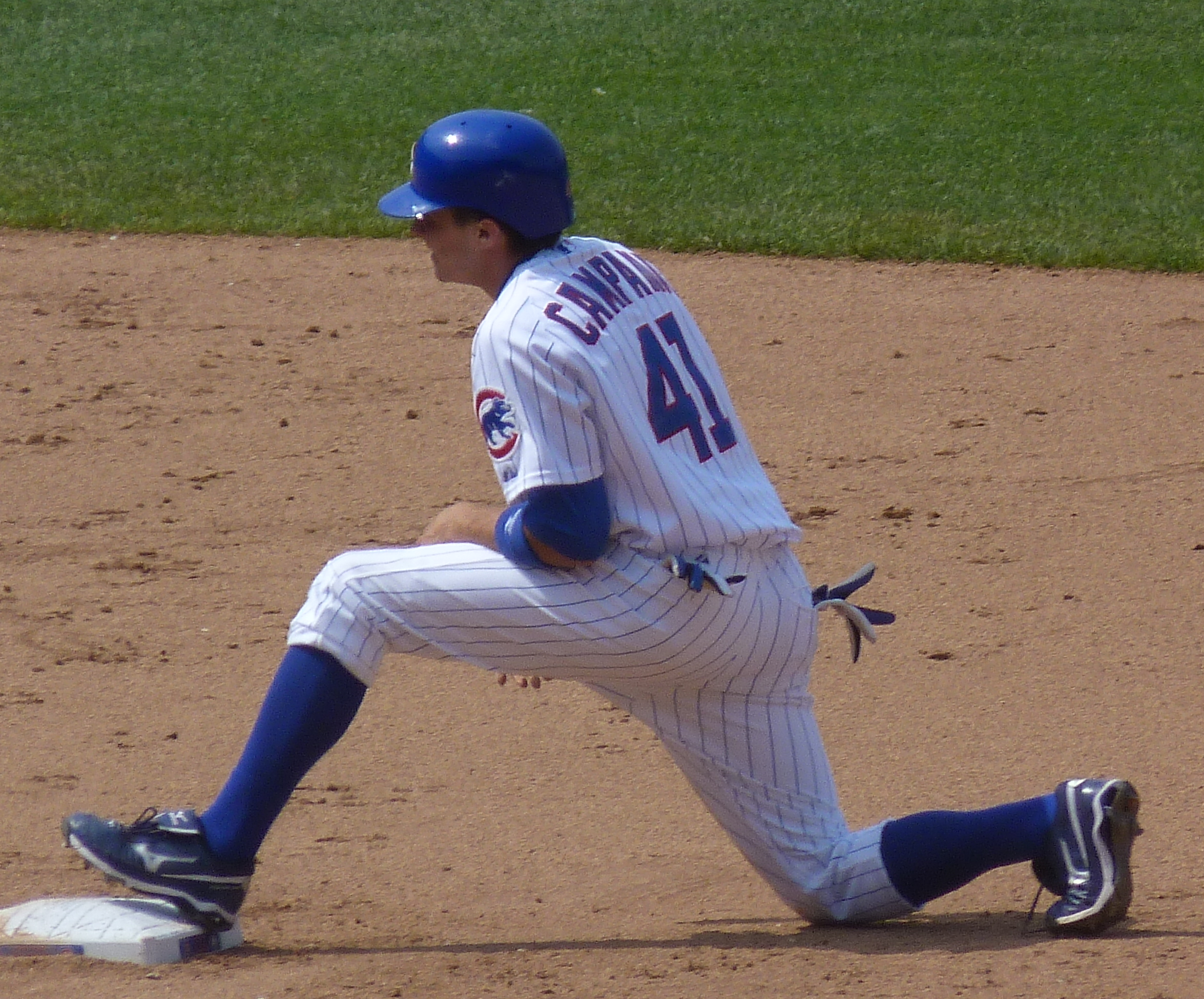
- Campana with the Chicago Cubs in 2011
- Center fielder
- Born: May 30, 1986 (age 40); Springboro, Ohio, U.S.
- Batted: Left Threw: Left

MLB debut
- May 17, 2011, for the Chicago Cubs

Last MLB appearance
- September 28, 2014, for the Los Angeles Angels of Anaheim

MLB statistics
- Batting average: .249
- Home runs: 1
- Runs batted in: 16
- Stolen bases: 66
- Stats at Baseball Reference

Teams
- Chicago Cubs (2011–2012); Arizona Diamondbacks (2013–2014); Los Angeles Angels of Anaheim (2014)

Anthony Edward Campana (born May 30, 1986) is an American former professional baseball center fielder. He played in Major League Baseball (MLB) for the Chicago Cubs, Arizona Diamondbacks and Los Angeles Angels of Anaheim.

== Career ==
=== Chicago Cubs ===
Campana attended the University of Cincinnati, where he played college baseball for the Cincinnati Bearcats. He was drafted by the Chicago Cubs in the 13th round of the 2008 MLB draft. Campana made his professional debut with the rookie-level AZL Cubs, and also played for the Low-A Boise Hawks, accumulating a .267/.340/.267 batting line. In 2009, Campana split the season between the Single-A Peoria Chiefs and the High-A Daytona Cubs, posting a cumulative .284/.336/.315 batting line with 30 RBI. The following year, Campana played for the Double-A Tennessee Smokies, slashing .319/.378/.384 with 39 RBI in 131 games. He began the 2011 season with the Triple-A Iowa Cubs.

Campana was added to the Cubs active roster on May 17, 2011, and made his MLB debut the same day. He made his debut in Cincinnati versus the Reds. On May 30, 2011, Campana stole second and third base, becoming the first Cub since Alfonso Soriano in 2008 to accomplish the feat. He ended up stealing four total bases in the contest. On August 5, 2011, Campana hit an inside-the-park home run, his only big league home run, off the Reds' Mike Leake in the first inning. He finished his rookie season hitting .259/.303/.301 with 1 home run and 6 RBI in 95 games.

On August 5, 2012, Campana was optioned to Triple-A Iowa. In November 2012, Campana started to play for the Leones del Caracas in the Venezuelan league LVBP. He was recalled on September 1 and finished the season batting .264/.308/.299 in 89 games. Campana was designated for assignment by the Cubs on February 10, 2013.

=== Arizona Diamondbacks ===
On February 18, 2013, Campana was traded to the Arizona Diamondbacks for right-handed pitchers Jesus Castillo and Erick Leal. He spent the 2013 season up and down between the Triple-A Reno Aces and Arizona, hitting .261/.370/.304 in 29 major league games. In an 18-inning game on August 24, 2013, against the Philadelphia Phillies, Campana walked five times, one walk shy of the Major League record. Teammate Cliff Pennington also walked five times. The teams drew a combined 28 bases on balls, a National League record. The Diamondbacks' 18 walks tied the National League mark. The game lasted seven hours and six minutes, the longest in franchise history for both clubs. Campana began the 2014 season with Arizona, again going up and down between Reno, and recorded a .150/.164/.200 slash line in 26 games.

=== Los Angeles Angels of Anaheim ===
On July 5, 2014, Campana was traded along with Joe Thatcher to the Los Angeles Angels in exchange for prospects Zach Borenstein and Joey Krehbiel. He was assigned to the Triple-A Salt Lake Bees before later being called up to the big league club, where he went 5-for-15 in 18 games. On October 27, Campana was outrighted off of the 40-man roster and elected free agency 5 days later.

=== Chicago White Sox ===
On November 28, 2014, Campana signed a minor league contract with the Chicago White Sox organization. However, on March 4, 2015, the White Sox released Campana after he suffered a torn ACL during training.

=== Washington Nationals ===
On August 11, 2015, Campana signed a minor league deal with the Washington Nationals organization which ran through the 2016 season. After hitting .225/.301/.342 in 43 games with the Triple-A Syracuse Chiefs, Campana was released by the Nationals organization on June 27, 2016.

=== Chicago White Sox (second stint) ===
On July 4, 2016, Campana signed a minor league contract to return to the Chicago White Sox organization. He finished the season with the Triple–A Charlotte Knights, where he hit .205/.241/.217 in 29 contests. Campana elected free agency following the season on November 7.

=== Sioux City Explorers ===
On April 20, 2017, Campana signed with the Sioux City Explorers of the American Association of Independent Professional Baseball. Campana played in 96 games for Sioux City in 2017, slashing .301/.357/.342 with 1 home run and 23 RBI.

=== Rieleros de Aguascalientes ===
On February 7, 2018, Campana signed with the Rieleros de Aguascalientes of the Mexican Baseball League. In 112 games for Aguascalientes in 2018, Campana notched 136 hits with 1 home run and 30 RBI. In 62 games for the team in 2019, Campana logged a .298/.346/.436 slash line with 2 home runs and 26 RBI.

=== Sultanes de Monterrey ===
On June 25, 2019, Campana was traded to the Sultanes de Monterrey of the Mexican League. He finished the year with Monterrey, batting .344/.383/.423 in 54 games. Campana did not play in a game in 2020 due to the cancellation of the Mexican League season because of the COVID-19 pandemic.

=== Bravos de León ===
On February 2, 2021, Campana was traded to the Bravos de León of the Mexican League. He hit .255 in 11 games before being released by León on June 7, 2021.

=== Leones de Yucatán ===
On June 17, 2021, Campana signed with the Leones de Yucatán of the Mexican League. He was released by Yucatán on June 25, 2021, after going 3-for-23 in 6 games. The following day, Campana released a statement via Twitter announcing his retirement from baseball and thanking his family, friends and coaches.

=== Ed Bailey League ===
In 2022, Campana joined the Rockers of the Ed Bailey League in Knoxville, Tennessee. The wood bat league features a variety of players, such as current and former high school and collegiate players as well as some players with some professional experience. The league is played at Ridley-Helton Field (formerly Bill Meyer Stadium and former home of the Tennessee Smokies until 2000). The Rockers won the 2022 and 2023 Ed Bailey League Championship.

== Personal life ==
Campana was diagnosed with Non-Hodgkin's Lymphoma as a child. He underwent 10 years of treatment, and today is in remission.
