= Austin Voth =

American baseball player (born 1992)

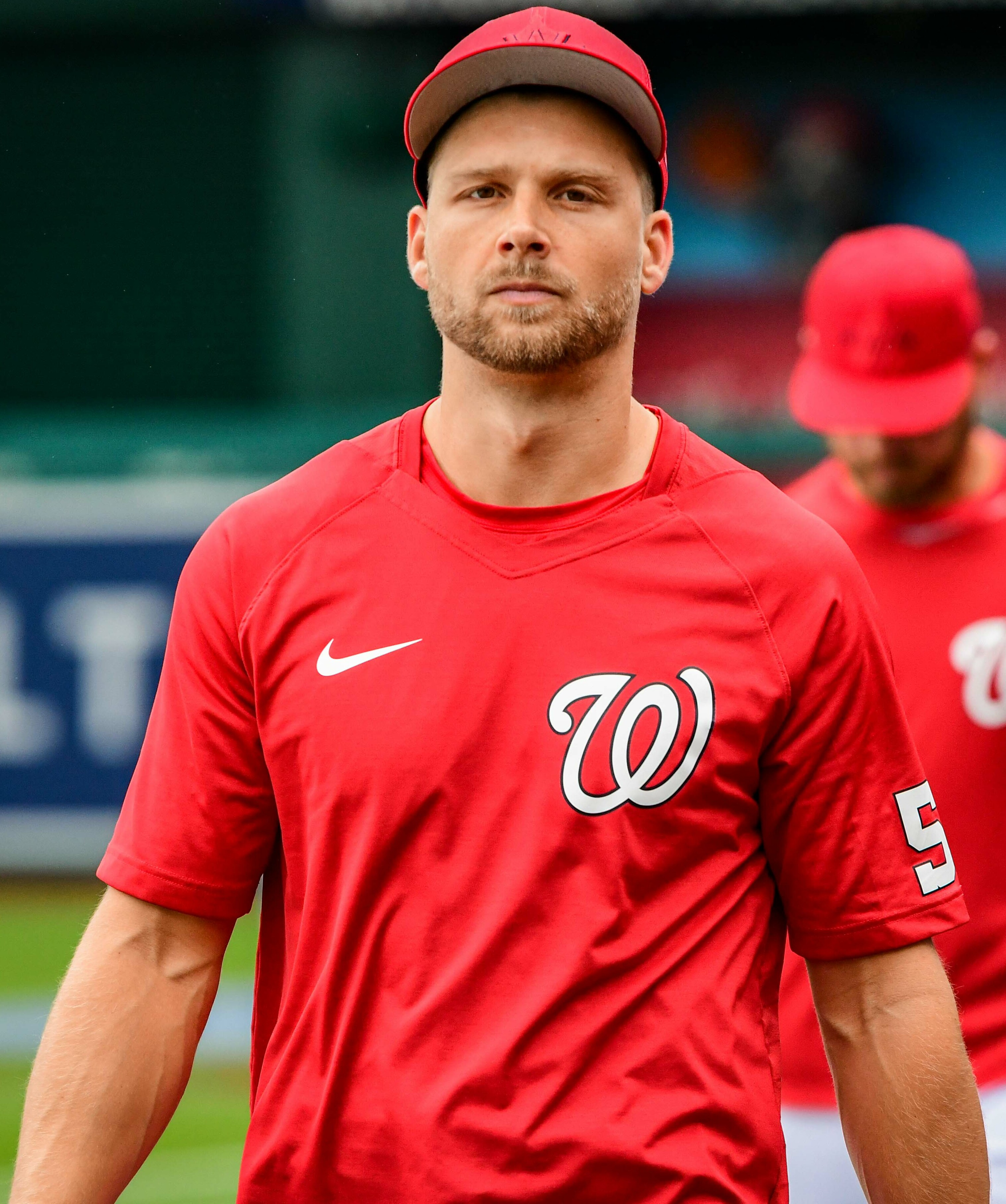
- Voth with the Washington Nationals in 2022

Samsung Lions – No. 43
- Pitcher
- Born: June 26, 1992 (age 34); Redmond, Washington, U.S.
- Bats: Right Throws: Right

Professional debut
- MLB: July 14, 2018, for the Washington Nationals
- NPB: March 29, 2025, for the Chiba Lotte Marines
- KBO: July 26, 2026, for the Samsung Lions

MLB statistics (through June 23, 2026)
- Win–loss record: 17–20
- Earned run average: 4.84
- Strikeouts: 346

NPB statistics (through 2025 season)
- Win–loss record: 3–9
- Earned run average: 3.96
- Strikeouts: 92

KBO statistics (through August 19, 2026)
- Win–loss record: 1-3
- Earned run average: 7.41
- Strikeouts: 23
- Stats at Baseball Reference

Teams
- Washington Nationals (2018–2022); Baltimore Orioles (2022–2023); Seattle Mariners (2024); Chiba Lotte Marines (2025); Toronto Blue Jays (2026); Minnesota Twins (2026); Samsung Lions (2026–present)

Austin Lee Voth (/ˈvoʊθ/ VOHTH; born June 26, 1992) is an American professional baseball pitcher for the Samsung Lions of the KBO League. He has previously played in Major League Baseball (MLB) for the Washington Nationals, Baltimore Orioles, Seattle Mariners, Toronto Blue Jays, and Minnesota Twins and in Nippon Professional Baseball (NPB) for the Chiba Lotte Marines. Voth was drafted by the Nationals in the fifth round of the 2013 MLB draft and made hs MLB debut in 2018.

== Amateur career ==
Born in Redmond, Washington, Voth attended Kentwood High School, where he helped the Conquerors win the 2010 state baseball championship. He was named to the Seattle Times' "All-Area team." Voth played college baseball at the University of Washington for the Huskies from 2011 to 2013. In 2011 and 2012, he played collegiate summer baseball with the Brewster Whitecaps of the Cape Cod Baseball League and was named a league all-star in 2011. He ended college with a 16–12 record and 3.94 ERA, striking out 213 batters in 242 innings.

== Professional career ==
=== Washington Nationals ===
==== 2013–2017: progressing through the minors ====
The Washington Nationals drafted Voth with the last pick of the fifth round of the 2013 Major League Baseball draft. He received a $272,800 bonus when he signed with the team. Voth made his professional debut that summer with the rookie-level Gulf Coast League Nationals. The GCL Nationals finished their regular season with an .845 winning percentage, the highest for a full regular season ever achieved by an American minor league baseball team based in the United States. Voth started two games for the team, giving up four hits but no runs or walks and striking out four in five innings. After those two games, Voth was promoted in early July to the Low-A Auburn Doubledays, then moved up again to the Single-A Hagerstown Suns in August. Voth finished 2013 with a 1.75 ERA in 11 professional starts with 55 strikeouts in 46 1/3 innings.

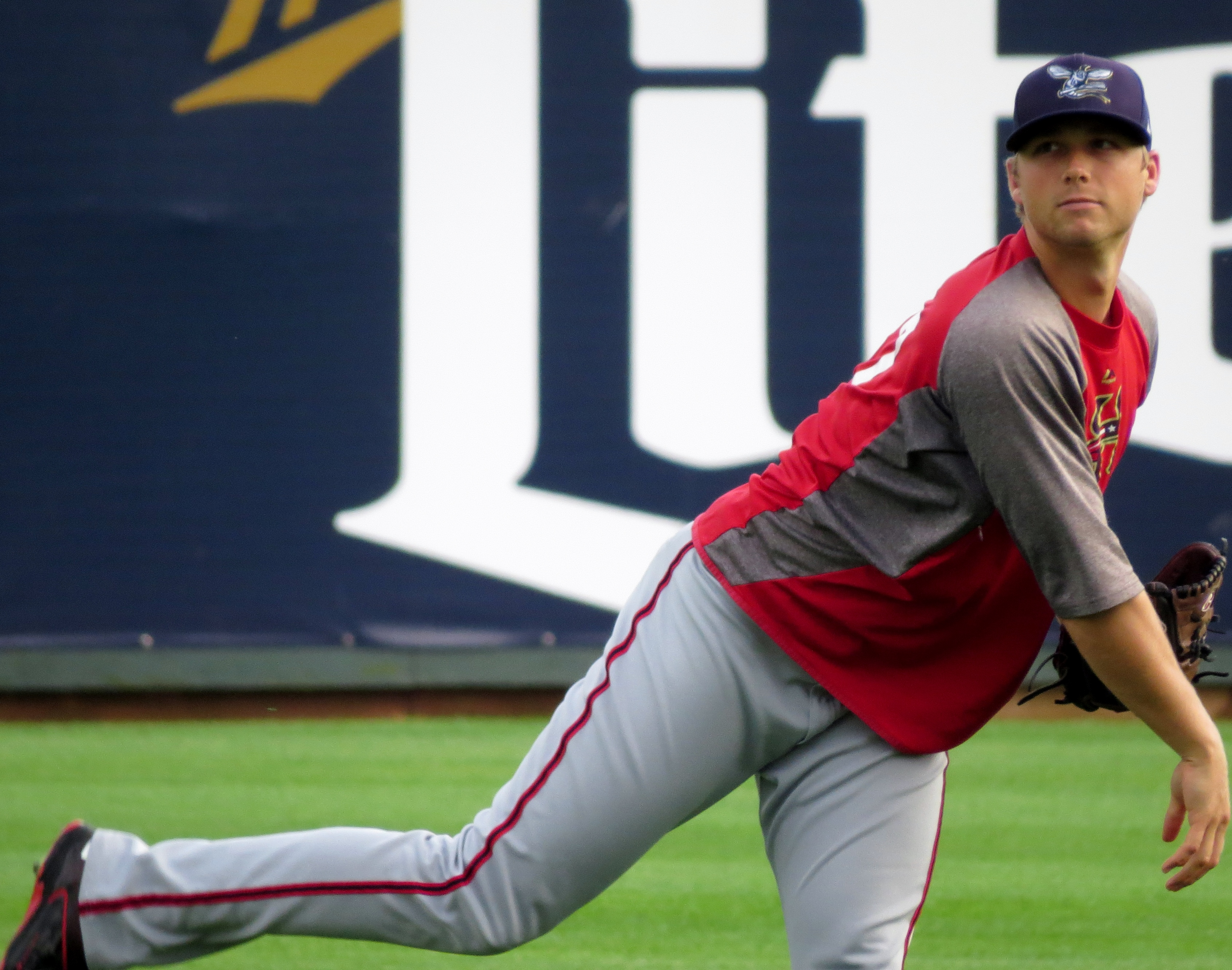
Voth with the Senators in 2015

Voth returned to Hagerstown to start the 2014 season. He was promoted to the High-A Potomac Nationals in June and then to the Double-A Harrisburg Senators in July. Voth spent 2015 with Harrisburg. In the 2016 season, he was promoted to the Triple-A Syracuse Chiefs and posted a 3.15 ERA in 157 innings. After the Triple-A season, Voth played for the Glendale Desert Dogs in the Arizona Fall League. The Nationals added Voth to their 40-man roster in November 2016. The Washington Post described him as "on the doorstep of the Nationals' rotation" during spring training in 2017.

However, Voth suffered a setback in 2017, as his velocity dropped sharply with his fastball falling to the mid-80s (mph). This resulted in a poor season, with an overall ERA of 5.94 in 13 games with Syracuse, 10 with Harrisburg, and one with Auburn in which he gave up four hits, a walk, and three runs in two innings. After peaking at eighth in the MLB Pipeline biannual ranking of prospects in the Nationals system before the 2017 season, Voth was not ranked in Pipeline's top 30 in advance of the 2018 season.

==== 2018: MLB debut ====
After undergoing strength training during the 2017–2018 offseason, Voth's fastball velocity rose to a peak of 93 miles per hour (150 km/h). The improvement helped him to a strong start in 2018 season with Syracuse: he started four games, posting a 0.96 ERA in 18 2/3 innings, striking out 22 and walking two. He combined with three relievers to throw a seven-inning no-hitter on April 18, and his strikeouts-per-nine-innings for Syracuse rose from 5.7 in 2017 to 10.06 in 2018.

On April 29, the Nationals called Voth up to the major leagues for the first time, as bullpen depth one day after manager Dave Martinez used his entire bullpen in a 10-inning loss to the Arizona Diamondbacks. However, Voth did not pitch for the Nationals on April 29, and a day later he was replaced by reliever Wander Suero and optioned back to Syracuse without a major-league appearance. Martinez said that the Nationals wanted Voth to gain experience as a starter in Triple-A . Voth had another phantom player callup, joining Washington on June 18 for a double-header against the New York Yankees to make up games that had been rained out, but sent back to Syracuse the next day, without pitching in the majors.

Voth eventually made his major league debut on July 14, 2018, at Citi Field against the New York Mets. He gave up three runs after allowing a succession of singles in the second inning, then to recover before running out of steam in the fifth inning, in which he allowed four more runs before exiting the game. He took the loss as the Nationals were unable to recover from the seven-run deficit. He was optioned back to Syracuse the next day. He returned to the Nationals in September, after the Triple-A season ended. He won his first MLB game in his second start, pitching 5 scoreless innings to beat the Mets on September 22. Voth was 1–1 with a 6.57 ERA in four games for the Nationals.

==== 2019 ====
In 2019, Voth was 2–1 with a 3.30 ERA in nine games (eight starts), striking out 44 batters in 43 2/3 innings. The Nationals finished the year 93–69, clinching a wild card spot. The team eventually went on to win the World Series over the Houston Astros, their first championship in franchise history. Voth was not part in any postseason action but still won his first world championship.

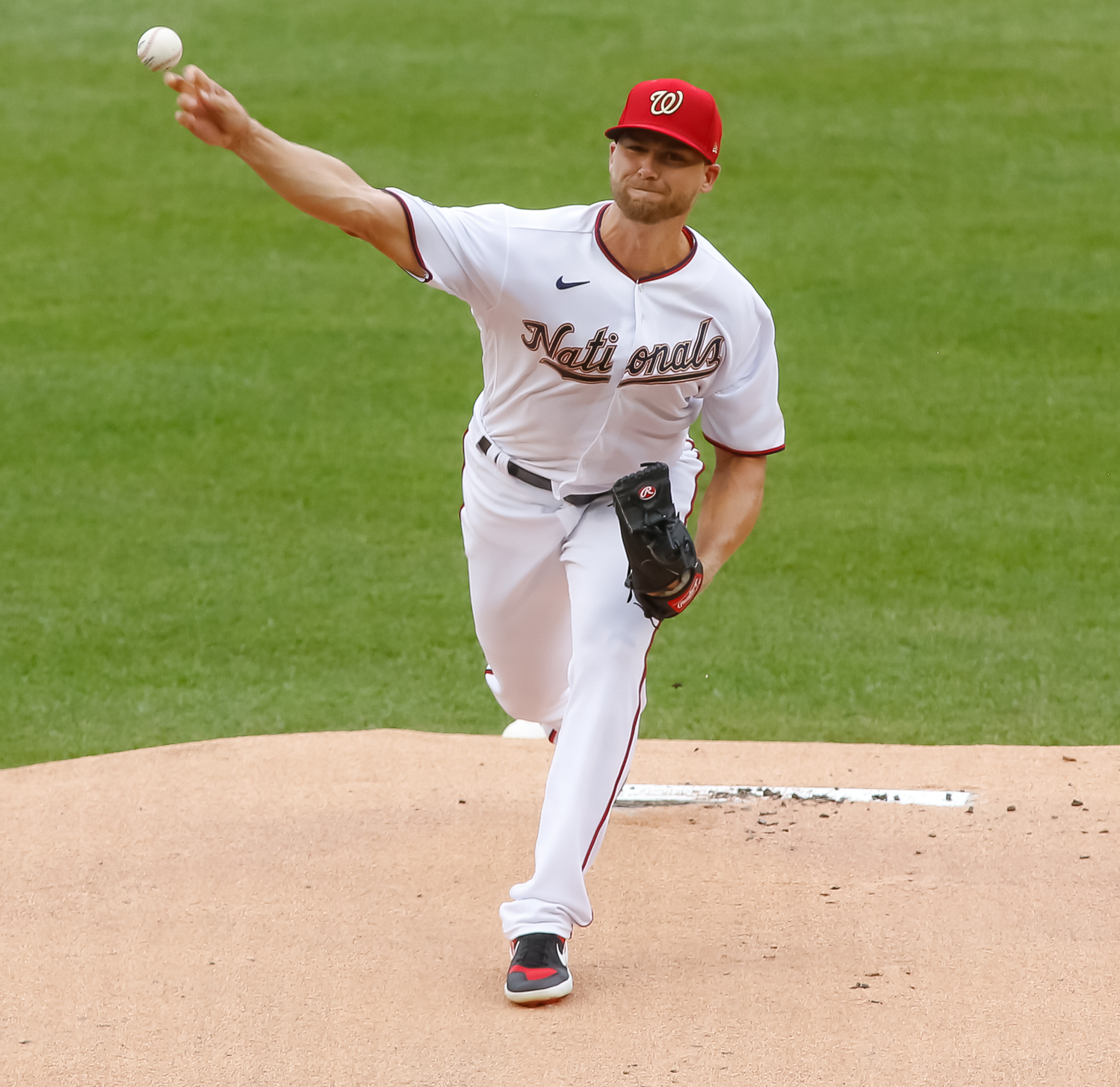
Voth pitching for the Nationals in 2020

==== 2020 ====
In the shortened 2020 season, Voth was part of the Nationals starting rotation, with a 2–5 record and 6.34 ERA in 11 starts, striking out 44 batters and walking 18 in 49 2/3 innings. He threw the only complete game of his MLB career on September 22, a 7-inning game in which he allowed a home run to Jean Segura but otherwise blanked the Philadelphia Phillies, striking out 7.

==== 2021–2022: move to the bullpen and DFA ====
Voth moved to the bullpen in 2021, making only one start, which ended in pain. On June 6, he started a bullpen game against the Phillies. He lasted into the third inning, when, while attempting to bunt, he was hit by a pitch from Vince Velasquez, breaking his nose. He went on the injured list on Jun 8. His ERA nearly doubled after he came off the injured list, rising from 2.73 before the injury to 5.34 by the end of 2021.

After allowing 21 earned runs in 18 2/3 innings for a 10.13 ERA in 19 relief appearances to start 2022, Voth was designated for assignment by the Nationals on May 31. He started 22 of 92 games and had a 9–8 record with a 5.70 ERA in parts of five seasons with the Nationals.

=== Baltimore Orioles ===
On June 7, 2022, Voth was claimed off waivers by the Baltimore Orioles. He returned his preferred role as a starter, making a career-high 17 starts to go along with 5 relief appearances. With the Orioles, he had a 5–4 record and 3.04 ERA in 83 innings.

In 2023, Voth resumed a relief role. He posted a 4.94 ERA across 23 appearances for Baltimore before he was placed on the injured list with right elbow discomfort on June 14. He was transferred to the 60–day injured list on August 7. On August 23, Voth came off the injured list. After two more appearances, he was designated for assignment by Baltimore on September 3. He cleared waivers and accepted an outright assignment to the Triple-A Norfolk Tides on September 5. In Game 2 of the International League championship series, Voth recorded eight consecutive strikeouts as part of his four inning scoreless innings in a Norfolk win. Voth elected free agency on October 11.

=== Seattle Mariners ===
On January 17, 2024, Voth signed a one-year, $1.25 million major league contract with the Seattle Mariners. He had a 2–5 record with a 3.69 ERA and 61 strikeouts in 68 games, the most in his career. In 2024, Voth was fifth among qualified pitchers at limiting hard contact. He began throwing his cut fastball, rather than a four-seam fastball, as his most frequent pitch, also throwing more sweepers. On November 22, Voth was non-tendered by the Mariners making him a free agent.

=== Chiba Lotte Marines ===
On February 9, 2025, Voth signed with the Chiba Lotte Marines of Nippon Professional Baseball. He made 22 starts for the Marines, compiling a 3–9 record and 3.96 ERA with 92 strikeouts over 125 innings of work. Voth became a free agent following the season.

=== Toronto Blue Jays ===
On February 13, 2026, Voth signed a minor league contract with the Chicago White Sox. He was released by the White Sox prior to the start of the regular season on March 20.

On March 25, 2026, Voth signed a minor league contract with the Toronto Blue Jays. He was assigned to the Triple-A Buffalo Bisons to begin the year. On April 5, the Blue Jays selected Voth's contract, adding him to their active roster. He tossed 2 2/3 innings against the Chicago White Sox that day, allowing one run on three hits with one strikeout. The following day, Toronto designated Voth for assignment. He cleared waivers and elected free agency on April 9. On April 11, Voth re-signed with the Blue Jays organization on a minor league contract. On May 27, Toronto added him back to their active roster. He allowed five runs across 3 1/3 innings of relief against the Baltimore Orioles on May 29, and was designated for assignment the following day. Voth elected free agency after clearing waivers on June 1.

=== Minnesota Twins ===
On June 4, 2026, Voth signed a minor league contract with the Minnesota Twins organization and was assigned to the Triple-A St. Paul Saints. On June 23, the twins selected Voth's contract, adding him to their active roster. Pitching for Minnesota that day, he took the loss after allowing six runs (five earned) on 11 hits over four innings pitched against the Los Angeles Dodgers. Voth was designated for assignment by the Twins the following day. He cleared waivers and elected free agency on June 26.

=== Texas Rangers ===
On July 2, 2026, Voth signed a minor league contract with the Texas Rangers. He made one start for the Triple-A Round Rock Express, taking the loss after allowing four earned runs on six hits with five strikeouts over five innings of work. Voth was released by the Rangers organization on July 15.

=== Samsung Lions ===
On July 20, 2026, Voth signed a six-week, $150,000 contract with the Samsung Lions of the KBO League as an injury replacement for Ariel Jurado.

== Personal life ==
Voth is married to Liz (née Mills) Voth. She played basketball for Kentwood and later the Sacramento State Hornets. They have a dog, Koda, who was born in 2019. The Voths had their first child, Charlotte Ann, in November 2022. Austin Voth's parents are Heidi and Ken Voth, and he has a younger brother, Collin.

Voth is a cousin of former MLB pitcher Sam Gaviglio. They competed against one another in 2011, when Gaviglio pitched for the Oregon State Beavers.

Voth and Taylor Jones were high school baseball teammates in 2010. Voth has faced fellow Kentwood alumnus Reese McGuire in the majors.
