= Spenser Watkins =

American baseball player (born 1992)

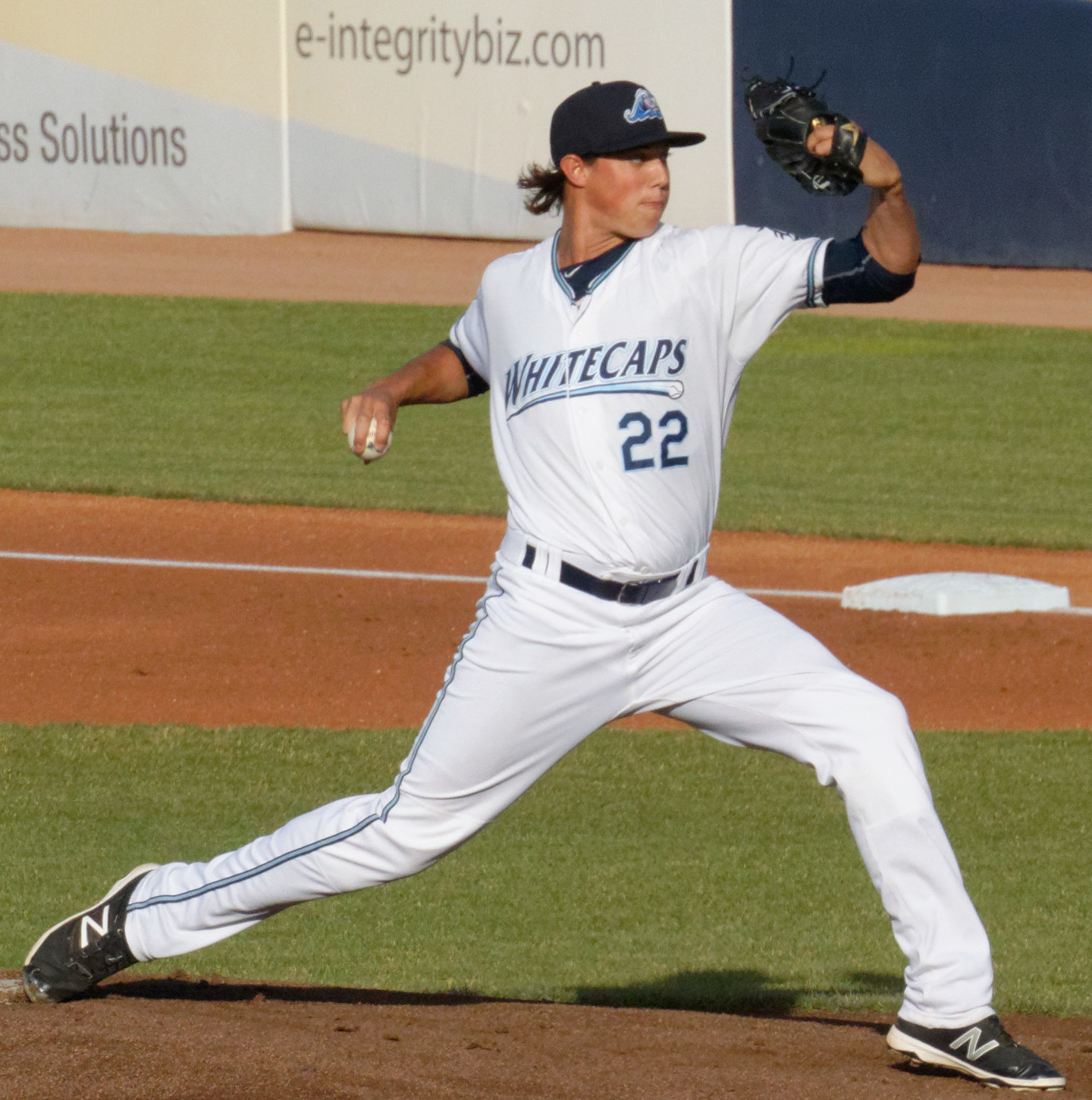
- Watkins with the West Michigan Whitecaps in 2016
- Pitcher
- Born: August 27, 1992 (age 33); Phoenix, Arizona, U.S.
- Batted: Right Threw: Right

Professional debut
- MLB: July 2, 2021, for the Baltimore Orioles
- CPBL: April 3, 2025, for the TSG Hawks

Last appearance
- MLB: August 15, 2023, for the Oakland Athletics
- CPBL: July 30, 2025, for the TSG Hawks

MLB statistics
- Win–loss record: 7–14
- Earned run average: 5.97
- Strikeouts: 102

CPBL statistics
- Win–loss record: 4–7
- Earned run average: 5.11
- Strikeouts: 55
- Stats at Baseball Reference

Teams
- Baltimore Orioles (2021–2022); Oakland Athletics (2023); TSG Hawks (2025)

Spenser David Watkins (born August 27, 1992) is an American former professional baseball pitcher. He played in Major League Baseball (MLB) for the Baltimore Orioles and Oakland Athletics, and in Taiwan's China Professional Baseball League (CPBL) for the TSG Hawks. Watkins was drafted by the Detroit Tigers in the 30th round of the 2014 MLB draft.

== Career ==
=== Detroit Tigers ===
Watkins attended Horizon High School in Scottsdale, Arizona. He was drafted by the Detroit Tigers out of Western Oregon University in the 30th round, 910th overall, of the 2014 Major League Baseball draft. Watkins made his professional debut with the rookie-level Gulf Coast League Tigers, posting a 3–2 record and 3.83 ERA with 43 strikeouts in 10 games. He split the 2015 season between the Low-A Connecticut Tigers and the Single-A West Michigan Whitecaps, accumulating a 5–4 record and 2.48 ERA with 69 strikeouts in 16 games between the two affiliates. On April 18, 2016, Watkins was suspended 50 games after a second positive test of a drug of abuse. Once activated he spent time with the Double-A Erie SeaWolves and West Michigan, pitching to a 5–3 record and 3.97 ERA between the two teams.

In 2017, Watkins split the season between the High-A Lakeland Flying Tigers and West Michigan, pitching to a cumulative 9–4 record and 3.53 ERA with 83 strikeouts in 109 2/3 innings of work. For the 2018 season, Watkins played with the Triple-A Toledo Mud Hens, Erie, and Lakeland, logging a 10–7 record and 2.76 ERA in 27 appearances between the three clubs. In 2019, Watkins split time between Toledo, Erie, and Lakeland, struggling to a 6.07 ERA and 9–7 record with 121 strikeouts in 138 innings pitched.

Watkins did not play in a game in 2020 due to the cancellation of the minor league season because of the COVID-19 pandemic. On July 3, 2020, Watkins was released by the Tigers organization.

=== Baltimore Orioles ===
On February 2, 2021, Watkins signed a minor league contract with the Baltimore Orioles organization. Prior to signing with the Orioles, Watkins had been in line to take over as the head coach of the Paradise Valley High School freshman baseball team in Phoenix, Arizona. He was assigned to the Triple-A Norfolk Tides to begin the season, where he worked as a starter and logged a 1–2 record and 3.58 ERA in 7 games (6 of them starts).

On June 30, 2021, Watkins was selected to the 40-man roster and promoted to the major leagues for the first time. He made his MLB debut on July 2, pitching a scoreless inning in relief against the Los Angeles Angels. He also became the first player in franchise history to don the uniform number 80. On July 6, Watkins made his first career start against the Toronto Blue Jays, earning his first ever win after pitching 5.0 innings of 1-run ball. In the game, Watkins also notched his first career strikeout, punching out Blue Jays outfielder Randal Grichuk. Watkins was outrighted off of the 40-man roster on November 5 and elected free agency on November 7.

On November 11, Watkins re-signed with the Orioles on a minor league contract that included an invitation to spring training. On April 11, 2022, Watkins's contract was selected by the Orioles. Watkins made 23 appearances (20 starts) for the Orioles in 2022, recording a 5–6 record and 4.70 ERA with 63 strikeouts in 105.1 innings pitched.

Watkins was optioned to Triple-A Norfolk to begin the 2023 season. After struggling to a 7.27 ERA across 8 games (6 starts), Watkins was designated for assignment on June 20, after Anthony Bemboom was added to the roster.

=== Houston Astros ===
On June 23, 2023, Watkins was traded to the Houston Astros in exchange for cash considerations. In 6 games (5 starts) for the Triple–A Sugar Land Space Cowboys, he struggled to a 9.74 ERA with 16 strikeouts in 20 1/3 innings pitched. On August 6, Watkins was designated for assignment by Houston.

=== Oakland Athletics ===
On August 8, 2023, Watkins was claimed off waivers by the Oakland Athletics. He made one start for Oakland, allowing 5 runs on 7 hits and 2 walks with 4 strikeouts in 4 1/3 innings pitched. On August 30, Watkins was removed from the 40–man roster and sent outright to the Triple–A Las Vegas Aviators. On October 4, Watkins elected free agency.

=== Washington Nationals ===
On December 17, 2023, Watkins signed a minor league contract with the Washington Nationals. He had been close to a deal with a team in the KBO League but decided to stay stateside due to the impending birth of his daughter. Watkins made 25 appearances (23 starts) for the Triple–A Rochester Red Wings, compiling a 7–7 record and 4.56 ERA with 92 strikeouts across 118 1/3 innings pitched. He elected free agency following the season on November 4.

=== TSG Hawks ===
On November 6, 2024, Watkins signed with the TSG Hawks of the Chinese Professional Baseball League. On July 31, Watkins was involved in a benches-clearing incident against the CTBC Brothers after he hit Kun-yu Chiang with a pitch after allowing 4 home runs that game. Watkins was not suspended by the league, but was demoted to the minor leagues by the Hawks. In 15 starts for the Hawks, he compiled a 4-7 record and 5.11 ERA with 55 strikeouts across 75 2/3 innings pitched. Watkins was released by the team on August 9.

On December 16, 2025, Watkins announced his retirement via his Instagram page.
