= Joey Krehbiel =

American baseball player (born 1992)

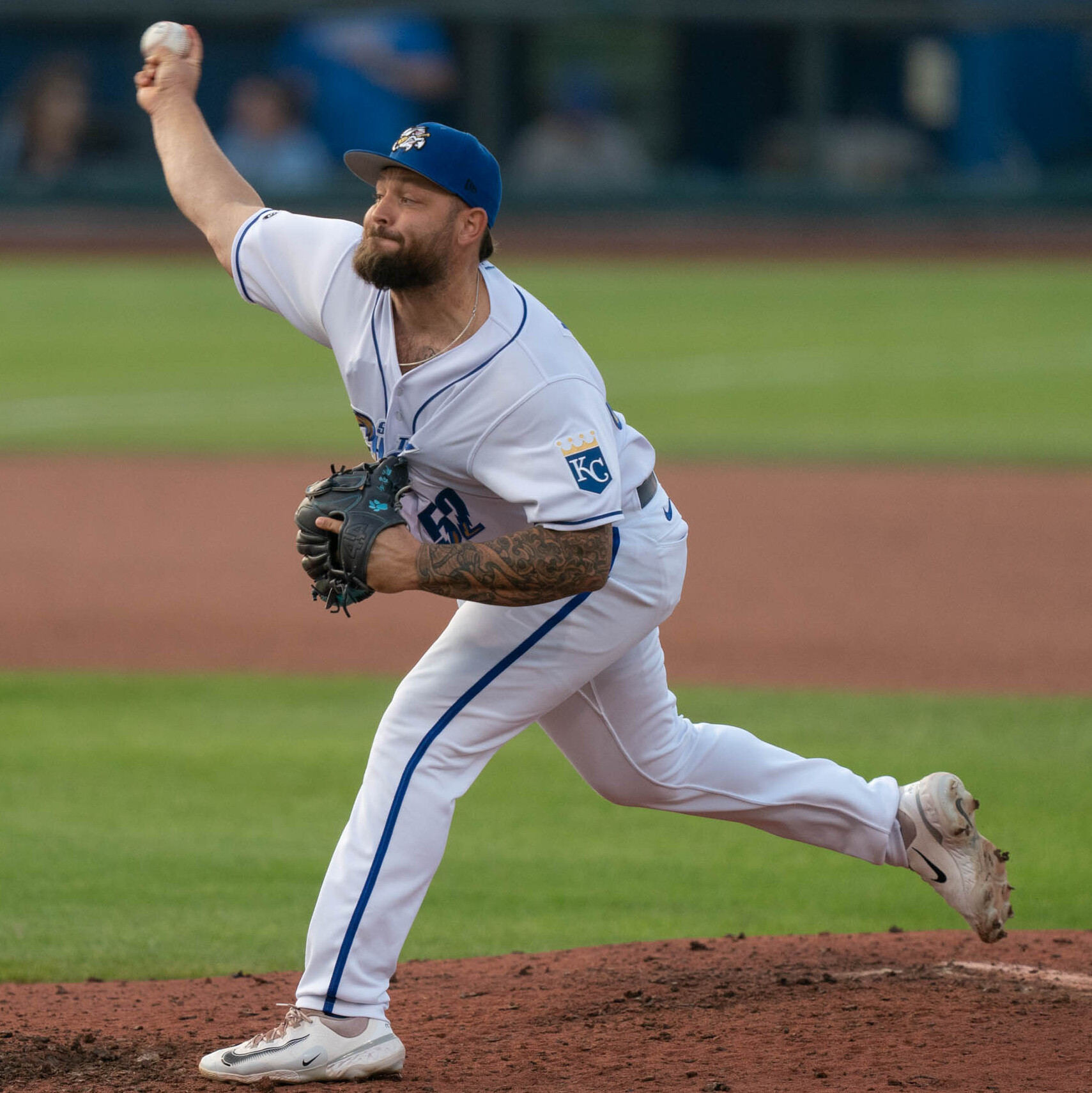
- Krehbiel with the Omaha Storm Chasers in 2025

Free agent
- Pitcher
- Born: December 20, 1992 (age 33); Seminole, Florida, U.S.
- Bats: Right Throws: Right

MLB debut
- July 2, 2018, for the Arizona Diamondbacks

MLB statistics (through 2023 season)
- Win–loss record: 6–5
- Earned run average: 3.65
- Strikeouts: 57
- Stats at Baseball Reference

Teams
- Arizona Diamondbacks (2018); Tampa Bay Rays (2021); Baltimore Orioles (2021–2023)

Joseph Roland Krehbiel (/ˈkreɪbʌl/ KRAY-bul; born December 20, 1992) is an American professional baseball pitcher who is a free agent. He has previously played in Major League Baseball (MLB) for the Arizona Diamondbacks, Tampa Bay Rays, and Baltimore Orioles.

== Career ==
=== Los Angeles Angels ===
Krehbiel attended Seminole High School in Seminole, Florida. He was drafted by the Los Angeles Angels of Anaheim in the 12th round of the 2011 MLB draft. He signed with the Angels, and played in their organization from 2011 through part of 2014. During his time with them, he played for the Arizona League Angels, Orem Owlz, Burlington Bees, and the Inland Empire 66ers.

=== Arizona Diamondbacks ===
On July 5, 2014, the Angels traded Krehbiel along with Zach Borenstein to the Arizona Diamondbacks in exchange for Joe Thatcher and Tony Campana. He played for the Visalia Rawhide after the trade in 2014. He spent the 2015 season with Visalia. His 2016 season was spent with the Mobile BayBears. He spent the 2017 season with the Jackson Generals and the Reno Aces. He spent the 2017 season back with Reno.

In 2018, he spent the minor league season with Reno, going 3–3 with a 4.24 ERA in 57 innings. On July 2, 2018, his contract was selected and he was called up to the major leagues for the first time. He appeared in two major leagues games in 2018.

Krehbiel opened the 2019 season back with Reno. He was designated for assignment on July 31, 2019. In 51 appearances out of the bullpen for Reno, Krehbiel struggled to a 7.69 ERA with 67 strikeouts across 64 1/3 innings pitched. He elected free agency following the season on November 4.

=== Minnesota Twins ===
On January 28, 2020, Krehbiel signed a minor league contract with the Minnesota Twins organization. Krehbiel did not play in a game in 2020 due to the cancellation of the minor league season because of the COVID-19 pandemic. He became a free agent on November 2.

=== Tampa Bay Rays ===
On February 10, 2021, Krehbiel signed a minor league contract with the Tampa Bay Rays organization that included an invitation to Spring Training. On September 18, the Rays selected his contract to the active roster. Krehbiel made 1 appearance for the Rays, tossing 1 scoreless inning while striking out 2. On September 19, the Rays designated him for assignment.

=== Baltimore Orioles ===
On September 21, 2021, Krehbiel was claimed off waivers by the Baltimore Orioles. Krehbiel appeared in 5 games for the Orioles in 2021, pitching to a 4.91 ERA. He made the Opening Day roster for the first time in his career in 2022. On July 16, Krehbiel pitched in relief of Cionel Pérez against the Tampa Bay Rays. He faced the final batter of the game, Luke Raley, in the 11th inning, and struck him out on 5 pitches to earn his first career save. Krehbiel made 56 appearances out of the bullpen for Baltimore, registering a 5–5 record and 3.90 ERA with 45 strikeouts and 1 save in 57 2/3 innings pitched.

Krehbiel was optioned to the Triple-A Norfolk Tides to begin the 2023 season. In 9 games for Norfolk, he recorded a 2.00 ERA with 6 strikeouts and 2 saves in 9.0 innings of work. On May 3, 2023, Krehbiel was designated for assignment following the acquisition of Luis Torrens. He cleared waivers and was sent outright to Norfolk on May 8. After posting a 3.00 ERA in 25 games for Norfolk, Krehbiel had his selected to the major league roster on July 30. In 6 appearances for Baltimore, he recorded a 1.80 ERA with 5 strikeouts in 5.0 innings of work. On November 1, Krehbiel was designated for assignment following the waiver claim of Sam Hilliard. He elected free agency on November 6.

=== Seattle Mariners ===
On January 16, 2024, Krehbiel signed a minor league contract with the Seattle Mariners. In 54 appearances for the Triple-A Tacoma Rainiers, he compiled a 5–3 record and 3.26 ERA with 55 strikeouts and 10 saves across 58 innings pitched. Krehbiel elected free agency following the season on November 4.

=== Tampa Bay Rays (second stint) ===
On January 8, 2025, Krehbiel signed a minor league contract with the Tampa Bay Rays. In 25 appearances for the Triple-A Durham Bulls, Krehbiel logged a 4–1 record and 6.11 ERA with 34 strikeouts and one save across 35 1/3 innings pitched.

=== Kansas City Royals ===
On July 23, 2025, Krehbiel was traded to the Kansas City Royals in exchange for cash considerations. He made 20 appearances for the Triple-A Omaha Storm Chasers, posting a 1–1 record and 4.09 ERA with 17 strikeouts and three saves over 22 innings of work. Krehbiel elected free agency following the season on November 6.

=== Guerreros de Oaxaca ===
On March 7, 2026, Krehbiel signed with the Guerreros de Oaxaca of the Mexican League. In 26 appearances for the Guerreros, he posted a 2–2 record with a 6.39 ERA, 17 strikeouts, and three saves in 25 1/3 innings pitched. On June 9, Krehbiel was released by Oaxaca.
