= Nick Vespi =

American baseball player (born 1995)

Diablos Rojos del México – No. 53
- Pitcher
- Born: October 10, 1995 (age 30); Miami, Florida, U.S.
- Bats: Left Throws: Left

MLB debut
- May 20, 2022, for the Baltimore Orioles

MLB statistics (through 2024 season)
- Win–loss record: 6–0
- Earned run average: 3.88
- Strikeouts: 46
- Stats at Baseball Reference

Teams
- Baltimore Orioles (2022–2024)

Nicholas Anthony Vespi (born October 10, 1995) is an American professional baseball pitcher for the Diablos Rojos del México of the Mexican League. He has previously played in Major League Baseball (MLB) for the Baltimore Orioles.

== Career ==
=== Baltimore Orioles ===
Vespi played college baseball at Palm Beach State College. He was drafted by the Baltimore Orioles in the 18th round of the 2015 MLB draft. Vespi made his professional debut with the Gulf Coast Orioles. He split the 2016 season with the GCL Orioles and Low-A Aberdeen IronBirds, registering a 5-1 record and 1.88 ERA with 41 strikeouts in 52 2/3 innings pitched across 13 games (10 starts). In 2017, Vespi split time between Aberdeen and the Single-A Delmarva Shorebirds, posting a 4-3 record and 4.41 ERA with 69 strikeouts in 49 innings of work.

Vespi spent the following two seasons with Single–A Delmarva. In 2018, he logged a 6–6 record and 2.09 ERA with 68 strikeouts and 9 saves across 64 2/3 innings. In 2019, Vespi logged an 8–6 record and 3.16 ERA with a career–high 100 strikeouts in 91 innings pitched. He did not play in a game in 2020 due to the cancellation of the minor league season because of the COVID-19 pandemic. Vespi returned to action in 2021, recording a 4.19 ERA with 51 strikeouts in 30 relief outings for Norfolk and the Double–A Bowie Baysox.

Vespi was called up to the majors for the first time on May 17, 2022. Vespi made his Major League debut on May 20, pitching two innings for the Orioles in an extra innings game against the Tampa Bay Rays, striking out three, giving up no runs, and being credited with his first career MLB win. He made 25 total appearances for the Orioles in 2022, logging a 5-0 record 4.10 ERA with 28 strikeouts across 26.1 innings pitched. On January 5, 2023, Vespi underwent hernia surgery.

Vespi was optioned to the Triple-A Norfolk Tides to begin the 2023 season. In 9 appearances for the Orioles, he recorded a 4.30 ERA with 9 strikeouts across 14 2/3 innings pitched.

Vespi started the 2024 season in Norfolk before being called up and sent down multiple times. In 11 games for Baltimore, he recorded a 2.92 ERA with 9 strikeouts across 12 1/3 innings of work. Vespi was designated for assignment following the acquisition of Brooks Kriske on August 25, 2024. He cleared waivers and was sent outright to Norfolk on September 1. Vespi elected free agency following the season on November 4.

=== Philadelphia Phillies ===
On December 19, 2024, Vespi signed a minor league contract with the Philadelphia Phillies. In 20 appearances for the Triple-A Lehigh Valley IronPigs, he struggled to a 7.85 ERA with 13 strikeouts and one save across 18 1/3 innings pitched. Vespi was released by the Phillies organization on June 22, 2025.

=== Diablos Rojos del México ===
On July 1, 2025, Vespi signed with the Diablos Rojos del México of the Mexican League. He made 16 appearances for the Diablos, posting a 3-0 record and 1.17 ERA with 17 strikeouts across 15 1/3 innings pitched. With the team, Vespi won the Serie del Rey.

== International career ==
On December 16, 2022, Vespi announced that he had been selected to represent Italy in the 2023 World Baseball Classic.
