= Tyler Wells =

American baseball player (born 1994)

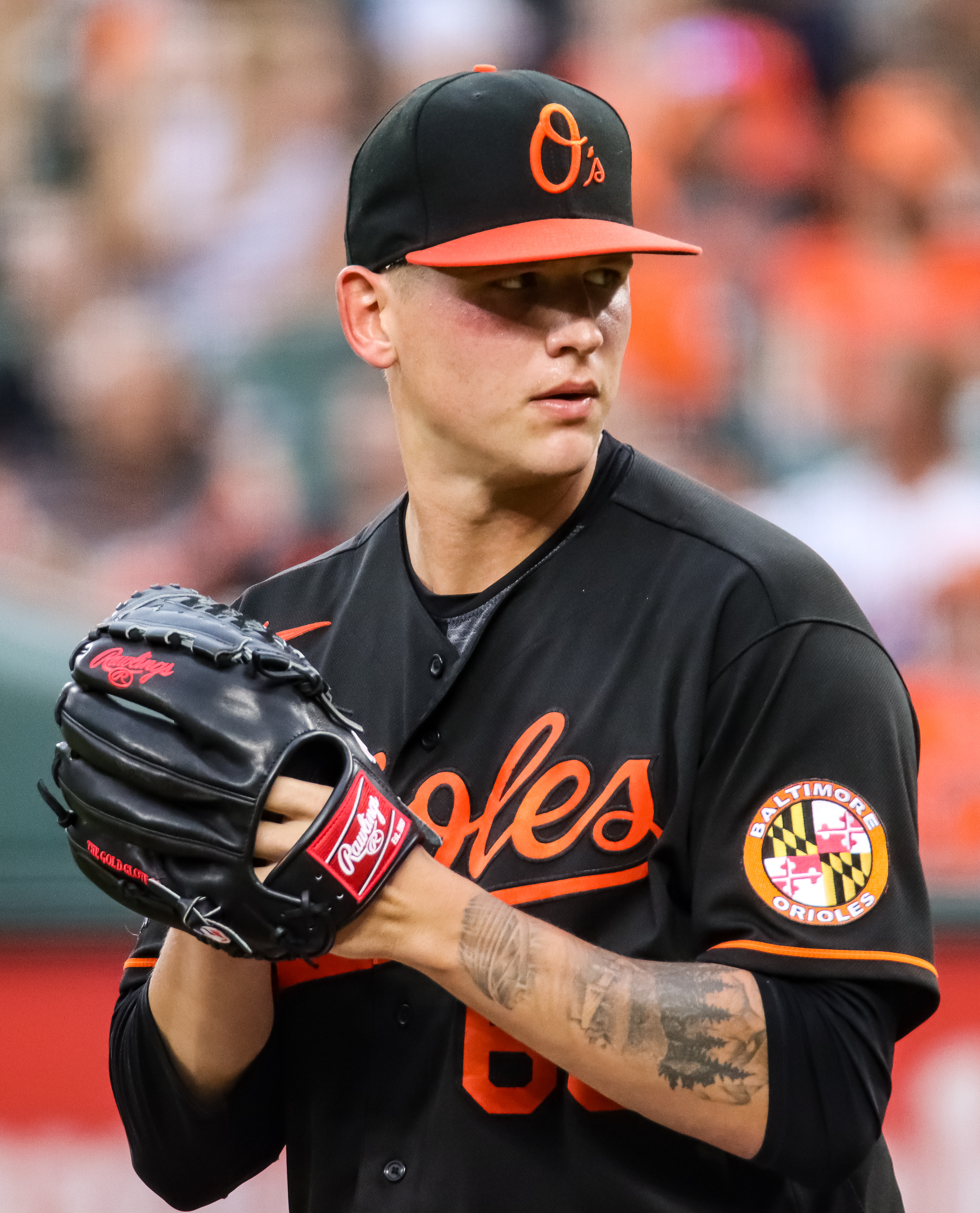
- Wells with the Baltimore Orioles in 2022

Tampa Bay Rays – No. 68
- Pitcher
- Born: August 26, 1994 (age 32); Tulsa, Oklahoma, U.S.
- Bats: Right Throws: Right

MLB debut
- April 4, 2021, for the Baltimore Orioles

MLB statistics (through 2026 season)
- Win–loss record: 23–21
- Earned run average: 3.68
- Strikeouts: 361
- Stats at Baseball Reference

Teams
- Baltimore Orioles (2021–2026); Tampa Bay Rays (2026–present)

Tyler Austin Wells (born August 26, 1994) is an American professional baseball pitcher for the Tampa Bay Rays of Major League Baseball (MLB). He made his MLB debut in 2021 with the Baltimore Orioles.

== Amateur career ==
Wells attended University High School in Morgantown, West Virginia as a freshman and sophomore before transferring to Yucaipa High School in Yucaipa, California. As a junior in 2012, he went 8–0 with a 0.84 ERA. In 2013, as a senior, he had a 0.28 ERA. Undrafted out of high school in the 2013 Major League Baseball draft, Wells enrolled at California State University, San Bernardino where he played college baseball for the Coyotes.

In 2014, as a freshman at CSUSB, Wells appeared in 11 games (eight starts), going 1–5 with a 4.30 ERA, and as a sophomore in 2015, he went 2–4 with a 4.93 ERA in 12 starts. Wells broke out as a junior in 2016, pitching to a 4–7 record with a 2.84 ERA in 15 starts.

== Professional career ==
=== Minnesota Twins ===
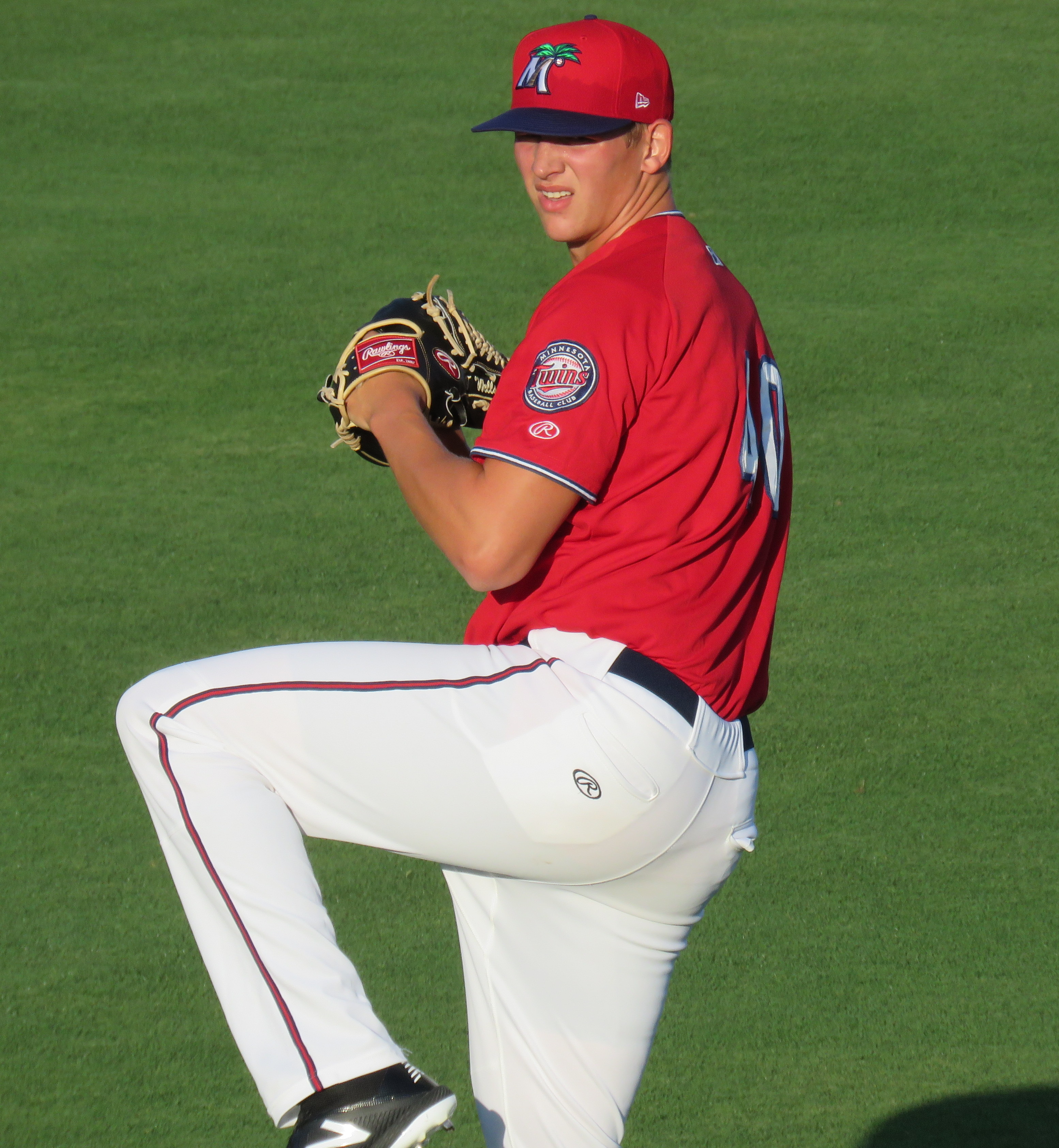
Wells with the Fort Myers Miracle in 2018.

After the season, Wells was selected by the Minnesota Twins in the 15th round of the 2016 Major League Baseball draft.

Wells made his professional debut with the Elizabethton Twins, going 5–2 with a 3.23 ERA in ten starts. He spent 2017 with the Cedar Rapids Kernels, going 5–3 with a 3.11 ERA in 14 starts, and began 2018 with the Fort Myers Miracle where he was named a Florida State League All-Star before being promoted to the Chattanooga Lookouts in July, where he finished the season. In 22 games (21 starts) between the two clubs, Wells went 10–6 with a 2.49 ERA and a 0.96 walks plus hits per inning pitched (WHIP).

Wells began 2019 with the Pensacola Blue Wahoos, but underwent Tommy John surgery in May, forcing him to miss the remainder of the season. Wells did not play a minor league game in 2020 due to the cancellation of the minor league season caused by the COVID-19 pandemic.

=== Baltimore Orioles ===
On December 10, 2020, Wells was selected by the Baltimore Orioles in the Rule 5 draft. In 2021, he made the Opening Day roster. On April 4, 2021, Wells made his MLB debut in relief against the Boston Red Sox, pitching a scoreless ninth inning. On June 2, he earned his first career major league victory, pitching three scoreless innings giving up only one hit against the Minnesota Twins. On September 5, Wells earned his first career save after pitching a perfect ninth inning in an 8-7 win over the New York Yankees. Wells missed time during the season due to wrist and shoulder injuries, but still pitched 57 innings in relief in which he went 2–3 with a 4.11 ERA and 65 strikeouts.

Wells spent the 2022 season in Baltimore's starting rotation, and made 23 starts. He ended the season with a 7–7 record, a 4.25 ERA and 76 strikeouts across 103 2/3 innings. He missed time in September due to shoulder inflammation.

Wells began the 2023 season in the Orioles bullpen, where he pitched five shutout innings in a winning effort against the Texas Rangers after an injury to starter Kyle Bradish. He would then be moved to the starting rotation, where he made an immediate impact as the Orioles best starting pitcher in the first half of the season. He pitched to a 3.18 ERA, striking out 103 batters in 104 2/3 innings. After surpassing his career-high in innings pitched before the All-Star break, Wells struggled in his three starts in the second half, allowing 11 earned runs in just nine innings. He was sent down to Double-A Bowie Baysox, where he made three starts before being moved to Triple-A Norfolk Tides. There, he appeared in seven games before being recalled to the Orioles. Wells made three scoreless relief appearances, including earning his fifth career save in a 2-0 win over the Red Sox on September 28 that clinched the Orioles' first AL East title since 2014 and secured the franchise's first 100-win season since 1980. He ended the season having appeared in 25 games (20 starts) with a 7–6 record, 3.64 ERA, and 117 strikeouts over 118 2/3 innings.

In 2024, Wells made three starts for Baltimore, recording a 5.87 ERA with 13 strikeouts across 15 1/3 innings pitched. On May 31, 2024, it was announced that Wells would undergo season–ending surgery to repair damage to his ulnar collateral ligament.

On September 2, 2025, Wells was activated from the injured list to make his season debut and return from surgery. He allowed two runs on five hits without issuing a walk and was the winning pitcher in a 6–2 away win over the San Diego Padres that night, which was his first MLB appearance in 508 days. Wells made a total of four starts for the Orioles and had a 2–1 record, 2.91 ERA, and 18 strikeouts over 21 2/3 innings.

Prior to the 2026 season, Wells and the Orioles agreed to a $2.075 million contract, avoiding salary arbitration. On May 2, he was optioned to Triple-A Norfolk. He was recalled by Baltimore on May 12. Wells became a full-time relief pitcher for the Orioles in 2026. He made 43 relief appearances and went 2–2 with a 2.67 ERA, 53 strikeouts, and four saves across 54 innings.

=== Tampa Bay Rays ===
On August 3, 2026, the Orioles traded Wells to the Tampa Bay Rays in exchange for Michael Forret. He appeared in 14 games for Tampa Bay had a 3–0 record, a 1.50 ERA, and 19 strikeouts across 18 innings pitched. Wells was placed on the injured list on September 15 with right forearm tightness, missing the end of the regular season. He returned to play in the 2026 American League Division Series.

== Personal life ==
Wells is married to his wife, Melissa. They have one daughter.

== See also ==
- Rule 5 draft results
