= Jordan Lyles =

American baseball player (born 1990)

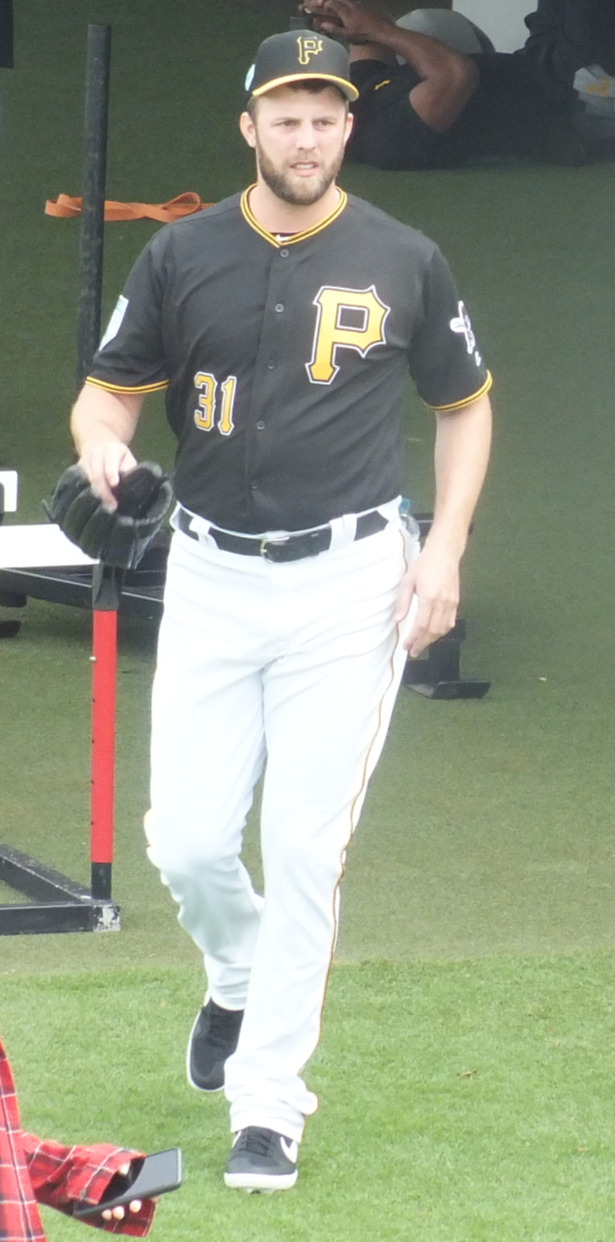
- Lyles with the Pittsburgh Pirates in 2019
- Pitcher
- Born: October 19, 1990 (age 35); Hartsville, South Carolina, U.S.
- Batted: Right Threw: Right

MLB debut
- May 31, 2011, for the Houston Astros

Last MLB appearance
- April 12, 2024, for the Kansas City Royals

MLB statistics
- Win–loss record: 72–107
- Earned run average: 5.22
- Strikeouts: 1,145
- Stats at Baseball Reference

Teams
- Houston Astros (2011–2013); Colorado Rockies (2014–2017); San Diego Padres (2017–2018); Milwaukee Brewers (2018); Pittsburgh Pirates (2019); Milwaukee Brewers (2019); Texas Rangers (2020–2021); Baltimore Orioles (2022); Kansas City Royals (2023–2024)

Jordan Horton Lyles (born October 19, 1990) is an American former professional baseball pitcher. He played in Major League Baseball (MLB) for the Houston Astros, Colorado Rockies, San Diego Padres, Pittsburgh Pirates, Milwaukee Brewers, Texas Rangers, Baltimore Orioles, and Kansas City Royals.

== High school ==
Lyles attended Hartsville High School in Hartsville, South Carolina. In his junior baseball season, he led the Red Foxes to a 4A championship, compiling a 6–1 win–loss record and a 0.85 earned run average (ERA). He went 7–2 in 2008, recording a 1.86 ERA and 89 strikeouts in 60 2/3 innings pitched. As a hitter, Lyles hit .447 with six home runs and 20 runs batted in. In football, Lyles set single-season school records with 81 receptions for 1,568 yards and 23 touchdowns.

== Professional career ==
=== Houston Astros ===
The Houston Astros selected Lyles with the 38th pick in the 2008 Major League Baseball draft. After signing, Lyles pitched in the Rookie-level Appalachian League, where he recorded 64 strikeouts in 49 2/3 innings. In 2010, Baseball America named Lyles the Astros' top pitching prospect. That season, he appeared in the All-Star Futures Game.

Lyles had his contract purchased by Houston on May 28, 2011. His first start with the Houston Astros came at Wrigley Field on May 31. He pitched 7+ innings and allowed two earned runs in a 7–3 win. He also got his first career hit. Lyles recorded his first major league win August 3, 2011, against the Cincinnati Reds. In the 2011 season with Houston, he was 2–8 with a 5.36 ERA.

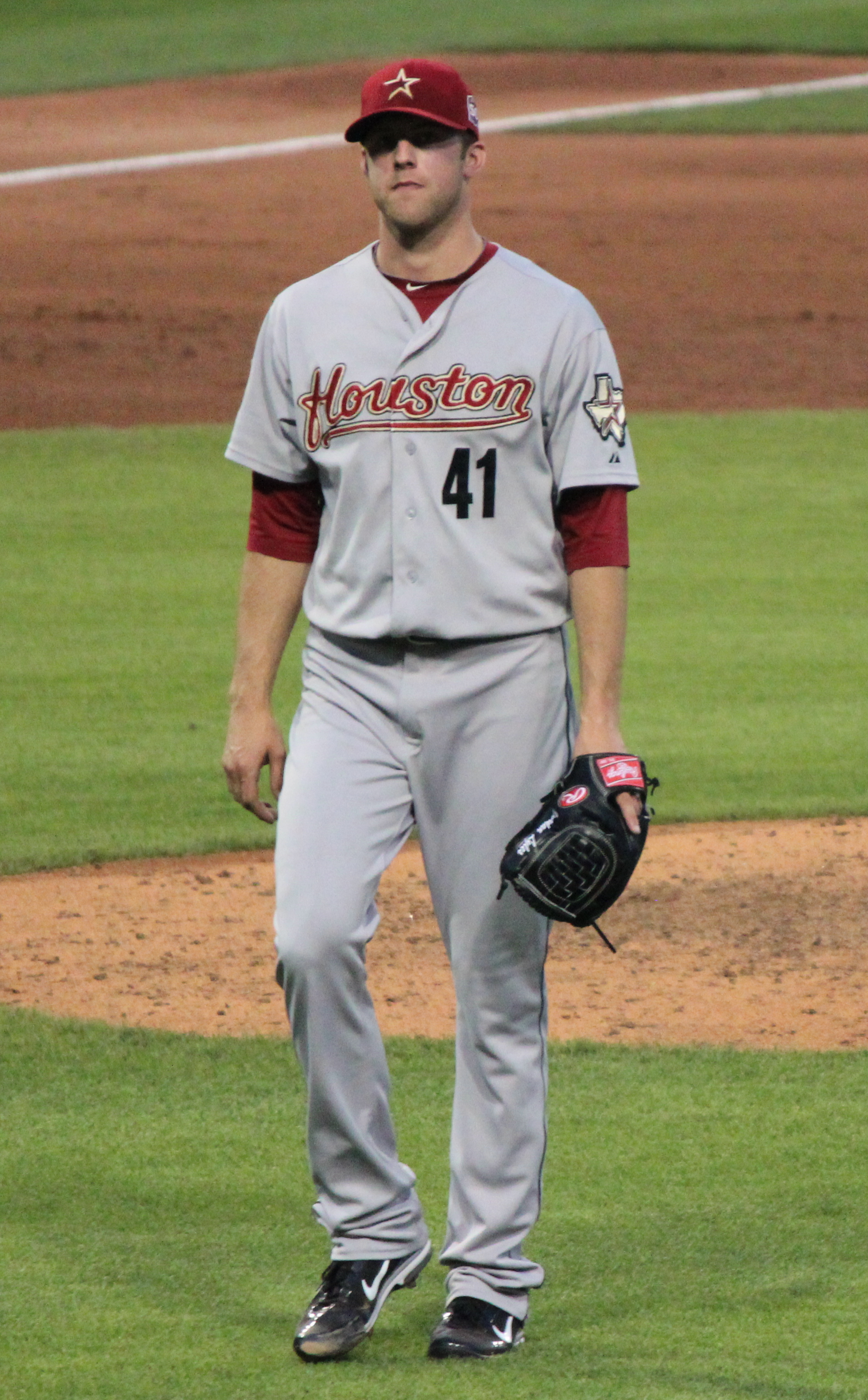
Lyles with the Astros in 2012

The Astros optioned Lyles to Oklahoma City at the start of the 2012 season. On April 29, Lyles was recalled to Houston to make a start for Kyle Weiland, who was placed on the 15-day DL. Lyles was 4–0 with a 3.46 ERA with 24 strikeouts in 26 innings at Oklahoma City. Lyles gave up three runs over six innings of work. Though he left with the lead, the bullpen lost control, and the Astros lost, 6–5. After the game, Lyles was optioned back to Triple-A to make room for Marwin González, who was activated from paternity leave. In the 2012 season with Houston, he was 5–12 with a 5.09 ERA.

In the 2013 season with the Astros, he was 7–9 with a 5.59 ERA. In AAA with Oklahoma City, he was 2–2 with a 5.32 ERA.

=== Colorado Rockies ===
On December 3, 2013, Lyles, along with outfielder Brandon Barnes, was traded to the Colorado Rockies for outfielder Dexter Fowler and a player to be named later. In 22 starts, Lyles tied a career high with seven wins and posted his lowest ERA of his career with a 4.33 in 126 2/3 innings.

On January 14, 2015, Lyles and the Rockies avoided arbitration, agreeing to a one-year contract worth $2.475 million. On June 1, Jordan was placed on the 15-day disabled list with a medial collateral ligament injury in his left big toe. On June 3, it was declared Lyles would need left big toe surgery, ending his season after just 10 starts. In 2015 with the Rockies, he was 2–5 with a 5.14 ERA.

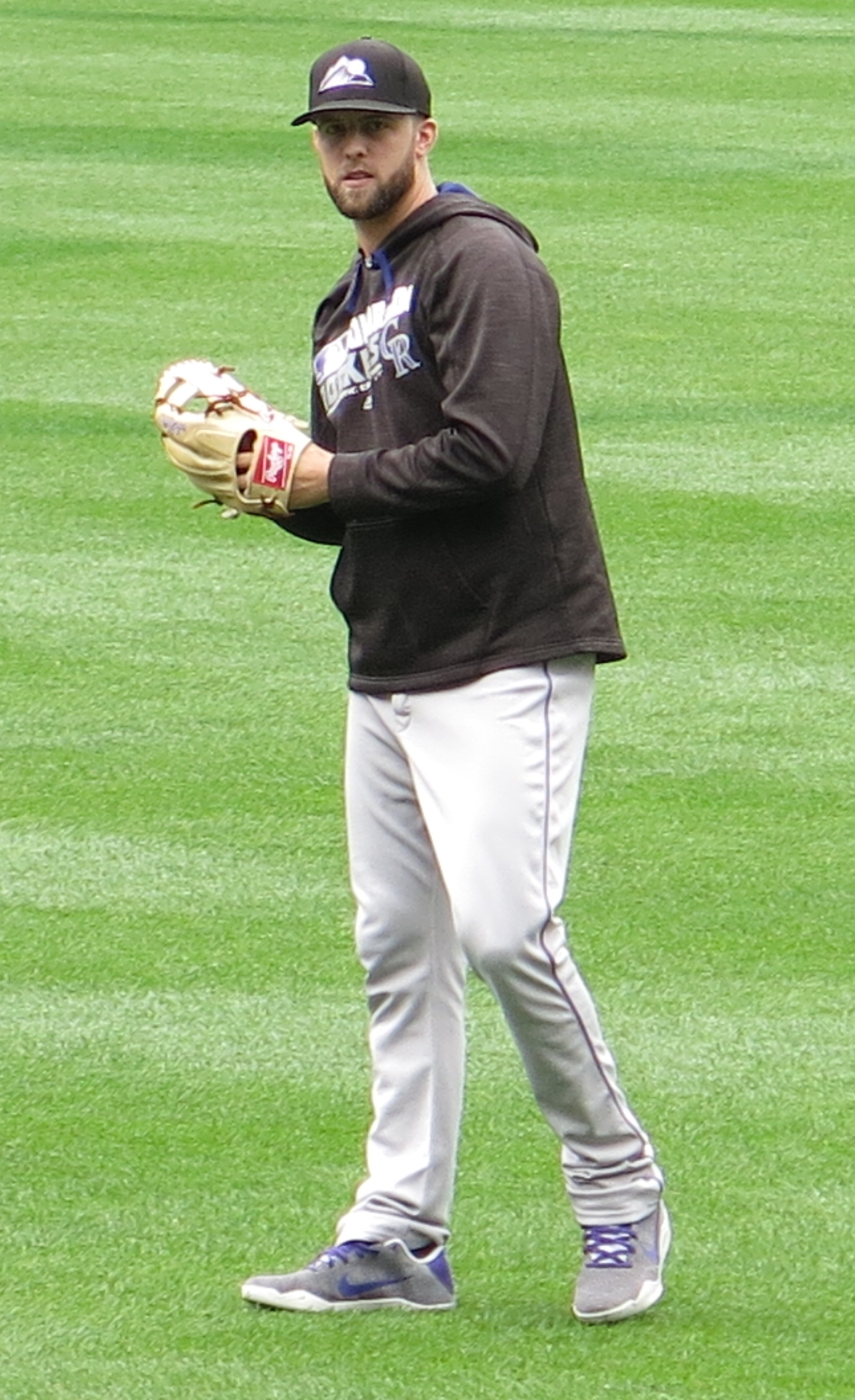
Lyles with the Rockies in 2016

In 2016, Lyles began as a starter but after five starts, he was shifted to the bullpen for the remainder of the season. He posted a record of 4–5 with a 5.83 ERA in 40 games in the majors. and in AAA with Albuquerque he was 4–2 with a 5.44 ERA.

The following season in 2017, Lyles was used mainly out of the bullpen to disastrous results, as he posted an 0–2 record with an ERA of 6.94 in 33 games. He was designated for assignment and released by the Rockies on August 1.

=== San Diego Padres ===
Lyles signed a minor league deal with the San Diego Padres on August 8, 2017. The Padres used Lyles as a starter for the final month of the season, in which he posted a 1–3 record with an ERA of 9.39.

On November 2, 2017, he was granted free agency. On December 17, 2017, the Padres signed Lyles to a one-year, $1 million contract to remain with the team. On May 15, 2018, Lyles threw seven perfect innings against the Colorado Rockies at home before allowing a hit in the eighth. Lyles split time between the bullpen and the rotation, appearing in 24 games while making eight starts. He pitched to a 4.29 ERA in 71 1/3 innings.

=== Milwaukee Brewers ===
On August 5, 2018, the Milwaukee Brewers claimed Lyles from the Padres off of trade waivers. In 11 games, Lyles posted a 3.31 ERA in 16 1/3 innings.

=== Pittsburgh Pirates ===
On December 17, 2018, Lyles signed a one-year, $2.05 million contract with the Pittsburgh Pirates for the 2019 season. He made 17 starts for the Pirates, with a 5–7 record and 5.36 ERA.

=== Milwaukee Brewers (second stint) ===
Lyles was traded back to the Brewers for Cody Ponce on July 29. He finished the season going 7–1 with a 2.45 ERA over 58 2/3 innings for the Brewers.

=== Texas Rangers ===
On December 13, 2019, Lyles signed a two-year contract with the Texas Rangers worth $16 million. In 2020 he went 1–6 with a 7.02 ERA. He tied for the AL lead in earned runs allowed, with 45. Lyles posted a 10–13 record with a 5.15 ERA and 146 strikeouts over 180 innings in 2021. He led the majors with 38 home runs allowed.

=== Baltimore Orioles ===
Lyles signed a one-year, $5.5 million contract with the Baltimore Orioles on March 12, 2022. On September 21, Lyles tossed his second career complete game, allowing only three hits in a start against the Detroit Tigers. The only blemish on his line was a Kerry Carpenter home run as the Orioles won the game 8–1. On the year, he was 12-11 with a 4.42 ERA over a career high 32 starts covering 179 innings. He led a resurgent Orioles pitching staff in innings pitched, strikeouts, and wins. He became a free agent on November 9, 2022 when the Orioles declined to pick up his contract option for 2023.

=== Kansas City Royals ===
On December 28, 2022, Lyles signed a two-year contract with the Kansas City Royals worth $17 million. He began 2023 at 0–11, losing in each of his first fifteen starts to set a Live-ball era MLB record. His first win was a 9–4 victory over the Tampa Bay Rays at Tropicana Field on June 24. In 31 starts, Lyles had a 6–17 record, a 6.28 ERA, three complete games, 39 home runs allowed, and was charged with a league leading 130 runs (124 earned). He was the worst qualified pitcher in 2023, leading the MLB in losses and had the highest ERA amongst qualified pitchers.

On March 21, 2024, manager Matt Quatraro announced that Alec Marsh had beat out Lyles for the final rotation spot, pushing Lyles to the bullpen to begin the year. He did not allow a run in any of the five innings he pitched for the Royals. He was placed on the restricted list on April 22 due to personal issues. On July 20, Lyles was released by the Royals after having reported to the team one month prior, with the team opting to not place him on their 26-man roster.

=== Los Angeles Dodgers ===
On July 25, 2024, Lyles signed a minor league contract with the Los Angeles Dodgers. With the Oklahoma City Baseball Club, he made five appearances (four starts) and allowed 11 earned runs in 15 1/3 innings for a 6.46 ERA. He became a free agent after the season.

== Pitching style ==
Lyles has had an unusually long career considering his below-average production. Lyles' 5.22 career earned run average (ERA) is the fourth highest of any pitcher in MLB history with at least 1,000 innings pitched (IP), behind only Jimmy Haynes (5.37), Scott Elarton (5.29), and José Lima (5.26); his adjusted ERA+ of 81 is also the fourth lowest among pitchers with 1,000 IP, behind Jim Hughey, Elmer Myers, and Bill Bailey, all of whom have an adjusted ERA+ of 80. Lyles’ lengthy career, despite his underwhelming performance, can be attributed to his ability to ‘eat innings’—pitching a high volume of innings regardless of quality—typically for teams outside World Series contention.
