= Anthony Bemboom =

American baseball player (born 1990)

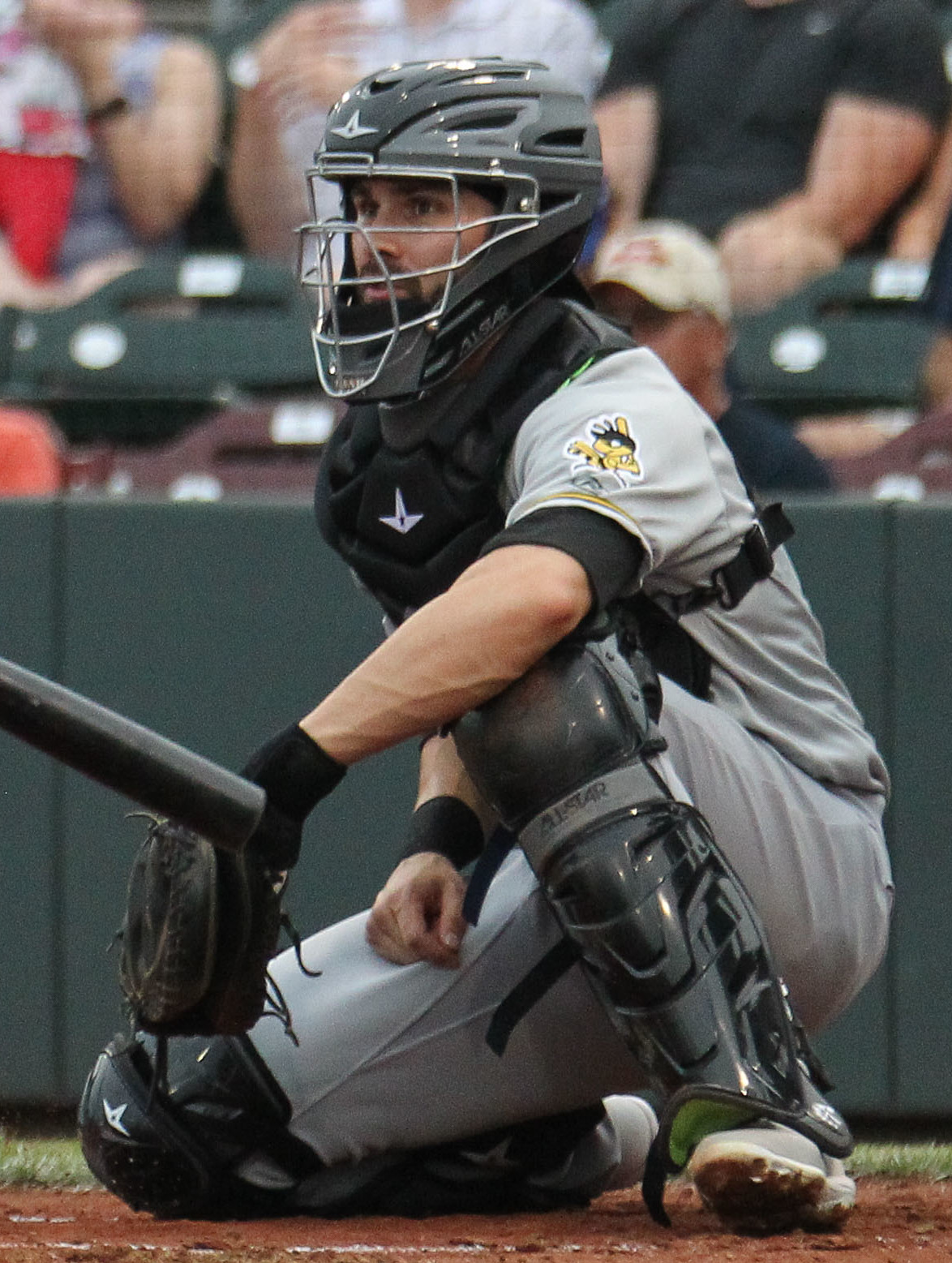
- Bemboom with the Salt Lake Bees in 2019
- Catcher
- Born: January 18, 1990 (age 36); St. Cloud, Minnesota, U.S.
- Batted: Left Threw: Right

MLB debut
- May 12, 2019, for the Tampa Bay Rays

Last MLB appearance
- July 2, 2023, for the Baltimore Orioles

MLB statistics
- Batting average: .161
- Home runs: 5
- Runs batted in: 12
- Stats at Baseball Reference

Teams
- Tampa Bay Rays (2019); Los Angeles Angels (2019–2021); Baltimore Orioles (2022–2023)

Anthony John Bemboom (born January 18, 1990) is an American former professional baseball catcher. He played in Major League Baseball (MLB) for the Tampa Bay Rays, Los Angeles Angels, and Baltimore Orioles.

== Career ==
=== Amateur ===
Bemboom graduated from Sauk Rapids-Rice High School in Sauk Rapids, Minnesota. He attended Iowa Western Community College in Council Bluffs, Iowa, from 2009 through 2010. He attended Creighton University in Omaha, Nebraska, from 2011 through 2012.

=== Los Angeles Angels ===
The Los Angeles Angels selected Bemboom in the 22nd round, with the 687th overall selection, of the 2012 MLB draft. He signed with the Angels and played in Minor League Baseball for their organization from 2012 through 2016. During his time with them, he played for the rookie-level Arizona League Angels, rookie-level Orem Owlz, Single-A Burlington Bees, High-A Inland Empire 66ers, Double-A Arkansas Travelers, and Triple-A Salt Lake Bees.

=== Colorado Rockies ===
On December 8, 2016, Bemboom was selected by the Colorado Rockies in the minor league portion of the Rule 5 draft. He played for the Triple–A Albuquerque Isotopes in 2017, slashing .278/.390/.459 with four home runs and 20 RBI.

Bemboom returned to Triple–A Albuquerque in 2018, playing in 70 games and hitting .232/.339/.351 with five home runs and 29 RBI. He elected free agency following the season on November 2, 2018.

=== Tampa Bay Rays ===
On November 26, 2018, Bemboom signed a minor league contract with the Tampa Bay Rays. He began the 2019 season playing for the High–A Charlotte Stone Crabs and the Triple–A Durham Bulls. On May 10, 2019, Bemboom was selected to the 40-man roster and promoted to the major leagues for the first time. He made his major league debut on May 12 versus the New York Yankees. Bemboom recorded his first career hit on May 14, an RBI double against the Miami Marlins. He later exited the game with a knee injury. He was placed on the injured list on May 16. On July 15, he was reinstated from the injured list and subsequently designated for assignment.

=== Los Angeles Angels (second stint) ===
On July 15, 2019, Bemboom was traded to the Los Angeles Angels in exchange for cash considerations. On August 24, 2020, Bemboom made his first career pitching appearance against the Houston Astros, pitching a scoreless inning after getting Carlos Correa, Taylor Jones and Michael Brantley to fly out following the walk of Kyle Tucker. In 2020, Bemboom batted .208/.328/.417 with 3 home runs and led all Angels catchers with a 41% caught stealing rate. On August 7, 2021, Bemboom was designated for assignment by the Angels.

=== Los Angeles Dodgers ===
On August 9, 2021, the Los Angeles Dodgers claimed Bemboom off waivers from the Angels. On August 14, Bemboom was outrighted off of the 40-man roster without having appeared in a game for the Dodgers. He played in 25 games for the Triple-A Oklahoma City Dodgers, with a .189 batting average. Bemboom became a free agent following the season.

=== Baltimore Orioles ===
On December 16, 2021, Bemboom signed a minor league contract with the Baltimore Orioles organization. He made the Orioles' Opening Day roster for the 2022 season. Playing in 22 games for Baltimore, Bemboom hit just .115/.207/.212 with one home run and one RBI. He was designated for assignment on May 21, 2022. He cleared waivers and was sent outright to Triple-A Norfolk Tides on May 27. Spending the rest of the season in Norfolk, Bemboom appeared in 34 contests, batting .228/.292/.350 with 3 home runs and 15 RBI.

Following the 2022 season on October 6, the Orioles added Bemboom to the 40-man roster to prevent him from reaching minor–league free agency. However, on November 4, Bemboom was removed from the roster and sent outright to Triple–A Norfolk.

On March 30, 2023, Bemboom had his contract selected after making the Opening Day roster. James McCann had suffered an injury and a backup catcher was needed, necessitating his promotion. After going 0–for–2 in just 2 games, he was designated for assignment on April 13. He cleared waivers and was sent outright to Triple–A Norfolk the same day. On June 20, Bemboom was selected back to the major league roster to replace José Godoy as the backup to Adley Rutschman. He went 2–for–9 in 4 more games, and was again designated for assignment on July 5, following the promotion of Colton Cowser. He again cleared waivers and was sent outright to Norfolk on July 12. On October 13, Bemboom elected free agency.

=== Detroit Tigers ===
On December 8, 2023, Bemboom signed a minor league contract with the Detroit Tigers. He made 58 appearances for the Triple-A Toledo Mud Hens in 2024, hitting .227/.345/.341 with two home runs and 26 RBI. Bemboom elected free agency following the season on November 4, 2024.

== See also ==
- Rule 5 draft results
