= 2023 Atlanta Braves season =

2023 Atlanta Braves
- National League East champions
- League: National League
- Division: East
- Ballpark: Truist Park
- City: Atlanta
- Record: 104–58 (.642)
- Divisional place: 1st
- General manager: Alex Anthopoulos
- Manager: Brian Snitker
- Television: Bally Sports Southeast; Bally Sports South (Brandon Gaudin, Jeff Francoeur, Tom Glavine, Nick Green, Kris Medlen, Peter Moylan, Gordon Beckham, Kelly Crull)
- Radio: 680 The Fan; Rock 100.5; Atlanta Braves Radio Network (Ben Ingram, Jim Powell, Joe Simpson); 1600 La Mejor (Daniel Cantú, Emanuel Zamarrón)

The 2023 Atlanta Braves season was the 153rd season of the Atlanta Braves franchise, the 58th in Atlanta, and the Braves' seventh season at Truist Park. The Braves were managed by Brian Snitker, in his eighth season as the team's manager. The Braves drew an average home attendance of 39,401 in 81 home games in the 2023 MLB season, the 5th highest in the league.

On September 10, 2023, the Braves were the first team in Major League Baseball during this season to clinch a playoff spot. On September 12, the Braves broke the National League record for most home runs in a season with their 281st home run, breaking the old mark set by the 2019 Los Angeles Dodgers. On September 13, the Braves clinched the National League East title for the sixth consecutive season. On September 26, the Braves reached their 300th home run of the season, becoming just the third team in MLB history to do so, joining the 2019 Minnesota Twins and the 2019 New York Yankees. On October 1, the last game of the regular season, the Braves hit their 307th home run, tying the 2019 Minnesota Twins for the most home runs hit by a team in a single season; additionally, first baseman Matt Olson broke the single-season home run record for the Braves, with 54.

The team also set the record for highest team slugging percentage in a season at .501, breaking the old record of .495 set by the 2019 Houston Astros. The Braves ended the season with a league-leading 104 wins, the highest number of wins for the franchise since 1998. Because of these strong offensive numbers, the 2023 Braves are often regarded as one of the greatest baseball offenses of all time.

However, the Braves were defeated in four games in the National League Division Series by their division rival Philadelphia Phillies for the second consecutive year.

Outfielder Ronald Acuña Jr. was awarded the NL MVP award at the end of the season, after posting the first-ever 40-70 season in MLB history.

== Offseason ==
=== Rule changes ===
Pursuant to the CBA, new rule changes will be in place for the 2023 season:

- institution of a pitch clock between pitches;
- limits on pickoff attempts per plate appearance;
- limits on defensive shifts requiring two infielders to be on either side of second and be within the boundary of the infield; and
- larger bases (increased to 18-inch squares);

== Regular season ==
=== Season standings ===
==== National League East ====
NL East
Team	W	L	Pct.	GB	Home	Road
Atlanta Braves	104	58	.642	—	52‍–‍29	52‍–‍29
Philadelphia Phillies	90	72	.556	14	49‍–‍32	41‍–‍40
Miami Marlins	84	78	.519	20	46‍–‍35	38‍–‍43
New York Mets	75	87	.463	29	43‍–‍38	32‍–‍49
Washington Nationals	71	91	.438	33	34‍–‍47	37‍–‍44

==== National League Wild Card ====
Division leaders
Team	W	L	Pct.
Atlanta Braves	104	58	.642
Los Angeles Dodgers	100	62	.617
Milwaukee Brewers	92	70	.568

Wild Card teams (Top 3 teams qualify for postseason)
Team	W	L	Pct.	GB
Philadelphia Phillies	90	72	.556	+6
Miami Marlins	84	78	.519	—
Arizona Diamondbacks	84	78	.519	—
Chicago Cubs	83	79	.512	1
San Diego Padres	82	80	.506	2
Cincinnati Reds	82	80	.506	2
San Francisco Giants	79	83	.488	5
Pittsburgh Pirates	76	86	.469	8
New York Mets	75	87	.463	9
St. Louis Cardinals	71	91	.438	13
Washington Nationals	71	91	.438	13
Colorado Rockies	59	103	.364	25

=== Record vs. opponents ===
==== Record vs. National League ====
2023 National League record Source: MLB Standings Grid – 2023
Team	AZ	ATL	CHC	CIN	COL	LAD	MIA	MIL	NYM	PHI	PIT	SD	SF	STL	WSH	AL
Arizona	—	3–3	6–1	3–4	10–3	5–8	2–4	4–2	1–6	3–4	4–2	7–6	7–6	3–3	5–1	21–25
Atlanta	3–3	—	4–2	5–1	7–0	4–3	9–4	5–1	10–3	8–5	4–3	3–4	4–2	4–2	8–5	26–20
Chicago	1–6	2–4	—	6–7	4–2	3–4	2–4	6–7	3–3	1–5	10–3	4–3	5–1	8–5	3–4	25–21
Cincinnati	4–3	1–5	7–6	—	4–2	4–2	3–3	3–10	4–2	3–4	5–8	3–3	3–4	6–7	4–3	28–18
Colorado	3–10	0–7	2–4	2–4	—	3–10	5–2	4–2	4–2	2–5	2–4	4–9	4–9	3–3	3–4	18–28
Los Angeles	8–5	3–4	4–3	2–4	10–3	—	3–3	5–1	3–3	4–2	4–3	9–4	7–6	4–3	4–2	30–16
Miami	4–2	4–9	4–2	3–3	2–5	3–3	—	3–4	4–8	7–6	5–2	2–4	3–3	3–4	11–2	26–20
Milwaukee	2–4	1–5	7–6	10–3	2–4	1–5	4–3	—	6–1	4–2	8–5	6–1	2–5	8–5	3–3	28–18
New York	6–1	3–10	3–3	2–4	2–4	3–3	8–4	1–6	—	6–7	3–3	3–3	4–3	4–3	7–6	19–27
Philadelphia	4–3	5–8	5–1	4–3	5–2	2–4	6–7	2–4	7–6	—	3–3	5–2	2–4	5–1	7–6	28–18
Pittsburgh	2–4	3–4	3–10	8–5	4–2	3–4	2–5	5–8	3–3	3–3	—	5–1	2–4	9–4	5–2	19–27
San Diego	6–7	4–3	3–4	3–3	9–4	4–9	4–2	1–6	3–3	2–5	1–5	—	8–5	3–3	3–3	28–18
San Francisco	6–7	2–4	1–5	4–3	9–4	6–7	3–3	5–2	3–4	4–2	4–2	5–8	—	6–1	1–5	20–26
St. Louis	3–3	2–4	5–8	7–6	3–3	3–4	4–3	5–8	3–4	1–5	4–9	3–3	1–6	—	4–2	23–23
Washington	1–5	5–8	4–3	3–4	4–3	2–4	2–11	3–3	6–7	6–7	2–5	3–3	5–1	2–4	—	23–23

Updated with the results of all games through October 1, 2023.

==== Record vs. American League ====
2023 National League record vs. American League Source: MLB Standings
Team	BAL	BOS	CWS	CLE	DET	HOU	KC	LAA	MIN	NYY	OAK	SEA	TB	TEX	TOR
Arizona	1–2	1–2	2–1	2–1	3–0	0–3	2–1	2–1	0–3	1–2	2–1	1–2	1–2	3–1	0–3
Atlanta	2–1	1–3	1–2	2–1	2–1	0–3	3–0	2–1	3–0	3–0	1–2	2–1	2–1	2–1	0–3
Chicago	2–1	1–2	3–1	1–2	2–1	0–3	2–1	0–3	1–2	2–1	3–0	2–1	2–1	2–1	2–1
Cincinnati	2–1	2–1	1–2	2–2	2–1	3–0	3–0	3–0	1–2	0–3	2–1	2–1	1–2	3–0	1–2
Colorado	1–2	2–1	2–1	2–1	1–2	1–3	2–1	2–1	1–2	2–1	1–2	0–3	0–3	0–3	1–2
Los Angeles	2–1	2–1	2–1	2–1	2–1	2–1	1–2	4–0	2–1	1–2	3–0	3–0	1–2	2–1	1–2
Miami	0–3	3–0	2–1	2–1	2–1	1–2	3–0	3–0	2–1	2–1	3–0	1–2	1–3	0–3	1–2
Milwaukee	2–1	1–2	3–0	2–1	1–2	2–1	3–0	2–1	2–2	2–1	0–3	3–0	1–2	3–0	1–2
New York	0–3	1–2	2–1	3–0	0–3	1–2	0–3	1–2	1–2	2–2	3–0	2–1	2–1	1–2	0–3
Philadelphia	2–1	1–2	2–1	1–2	3–0	2–1	2–1	2–1	1–2	1–2	3–0	2–1	3–0	0–3	3–1
Pittsburgh	1–2	3–0	2–1	1–2	2–2	1–2	3–0	1–2	1–2	1–2	1–2	1–2	0–3	1–2	0–3
San Diego	2–1	1–2	3–0	2–1	2–1	1–2	1–2	3–0	1–2	1–2	3–0	1–3	2–1	3–0	2–1
San Francisco	1–2	2–1	2–1	2–1	0–3	2–1	1–2	1–2	2–1	1–2	2–2	1–2	1–2	1–2	1–2
St. Louis	2–1	3–0	2–1	1–2	1–2	1–2	2–2	0–3	1–2	2–1	2–1	1–2	2–1	1–2	2–1
Washington	0–4	2–1	2–1	1–2	2–1	1–2	2–1	1–2	2–1	2–1	3–0	2–1	0–3	2–1	1–2

Updated with the results of all games through October 1, 2023.

=== Game log ===
Legend
	Braves win
	Braves loss
	Postponement
	Clinched playoff spot
	Clinched division
**Bold**	Braves team member

2023 Game Log: 104–58 (Home: 52–29; Away: 52–29)
March/April: 18–9 (Home: 7–7; Away: 11–2)

#	Date	Opponent	Score	Win	Loss	Save	Attendance	Record	Streak
1	March 30	@ Nationals	7–2	**Luetge** (1–0)	Corbin (0–1)	—	35,756	1–0	W1
2	April 1	@ Nationals	7–1	**Strider** (1–0)	Gray (0–1)	—	27,529	2–0	W2
3	April 2	@ Nationals	1–4	Gore (1–0)	**Shuster** (0–1)	Finnegan (1)	21,440	2–1	L1
4	April 3	@ Cardinals	8–4	**Morton** (1–0)	Woodford (0–1)	—	37,689	3–1	W1
5	April 4	@ Cardinals	4–1	**Dodd** (1–0)	Matz (0–1)	**Minter** (1)	36,501	4–1	W2
6	April 5	@ Cardinals	5–2	**Elder** (1–0)	Mikolas (0–1)	**Chavez** (1)	36,300	5–1	W3
7	April 6	Padres	7–6	**Minter** (1–0)	Crismatt (0–1)	—	42,803	6–1	W4
8	April 7	Padres	4–5	Honeywell Jr. (1–0)	**Tonkin** (0–1)	Hader (2)	41,963	6–2	L1
9	April 8	Padres	1–4	Wacha (2–0)	**Morton** (1–1)	Hader (3)	40,154	6–3	L2
10	April 9	Padres	2–10	Lugo (2–0)	**Dodd** (1–1)	—	40,138	6–4	L3
11	April 10	Reds	5–4 (10)	**Lee** (1–0)	Law (0–2)	—	30,237	7–4	W1
12	April 11	Reds	7–6	**Tonkin** (1–1)	Cessa (0–1)	**N. Anderson** (1)	33,559	8–4	W2
13	April 12	Reds	5–4	**Yates** (1–0)	Farmer (0–3)	**Minter** (2)	30,648	9–4	W3
14	April 14	@ Royals	10–3	**Morton** (2–1)	Singer (1–1)	—	20,186	10–4	W4
15	April 15	@ Royals	9–3	**Elder** (2–0)	Bubic (0–2)	—	17,644	11–4	W5
16	April 16	@ Royals	5–4	**N. Anderson** (1–0)	Barlow (0–2)	**Minter** (3)	22,040	12–4	W6
17	April 17	@ Padres	2–0	**Fried** (1–0)	Weathers (1–1)	**Minter** (4)	31,846	13–4	W7
18	April 18	@ Padres	8–1	**Strider** (2–0)	Snell (0–3)	—	42,693	14–4	W8
19	April 19	@ Padres	0–1	Martinez (1–1)	**Morton** (2–2)	Hader (5)	29,581	14–5	L1
20	April 21	Astros	4–6	Neris (1–1)	**Minter** (1–1)	Pressly (1)	41,397	14–6	L2
21	April 22	Astros	3–6	Valdez (2–2)	**Wright** (0–1)	Abreu (1)	42,399	14–7	L3
22	April 23	Astros	2–5	Neris (2–1)	**Minter** (1–2)	Abreu (2)	41,530	14–8	L4
23	April 24	Marlins	11–0	**Strider** (3–0)	Cabrera (1–2)	—	28,241	15–8	W1
24	April 25	Marlins	7–4	**Morton** (3–2)	Hoeing (0–1)	—	34,059	16–8	W2
25	April 26	Marlins	6–4	**Tonkin** (2–1)	Floro (1–1)	**Minter** (5)	30,282	17–8	W3
26	April 27	Marlins	4–5	Puk (2–0)	**Minter** (1–3)	Floro (1)	32,196	17–9	L1
27	April 28	@ Mets	4–0 (5)	**Fried** (2–0)	Peterson (1–4)	—	29,240	18–9	W1
—	April 29	@ Mets	Postponed (inclement weather); Makeup: August 12						
—	April 30	@ Mets	Postponed (inclement weather); Makeup: May 1						

May: 15–14 (Home: 8–7; Away: 7–7)

#	Date	Opponent	Score	Win	Loss	Save	Attendance	Record	Streak
28	May 1 (1)	@ Mets	9–8	**Strider** (4–0)	Reyes (0–1)	**Minter** (6)	see 2nd game	19–9	W2
29	May 1 (2)	@ Mets	3–5	Smith (2–1)	**Morton** (3–3)	Robertson (6)	27,603	19–10	L1
30	May 2	@ Marlins	6–0	**Elder** (3–0)	Alcántara (1–3)	—	8,626	20–10	W1
31	May 3	@ Marlins	14–6	**McHugh** (1–0)	Garrett (1–1)	—	10,428	21–10	W2
32	May 4	@ Marlins	6–3	**Dodd** (2–1)	Luzardo (2–2)	**Minter** (7)	8,295	22–10	W3
33	May 5	Orioles	4–9	Kremer (3–1)	**Fried** (2–1)	—	40,176	22–11	L1
34	May 6	Orioles	5–4	**Minter** (2–3)	Coulombe (1–1)	**Iglesias** (1)	41,454	23–11	W1
35	May 7	Orioles	3–2 (12)	**Tonkin** (3–1)	Pérez (1–1)	—	40,800	24–11	W2
36	May 9	Red Sox	9–3	**Morton** (4–3)	Pivetta (2–3)	—	36,805	25–11	W3
37	May 10	Red Sox	2–5	Bello (2–1)	**Minter** (2–4)	Jansen (9)	40,270	25–12	L1
38	May 12	@ Blue Jays	0–3	Bassitt (5–2)	**Strider** (4–1)	—	35,047	25–13	L2
39	May 13	@ Blue Jays	2–5	Swanson (2–1)	**Minter** (2–5)	Romano (10)	41,341	25–14	L3
40	May 14	@ Blue Jays	5–6	Pearson (1–0)	**Iglesias** (0–1)	—	40,895	25–15	L4
41	May 15	@ Rangers	12–0	**Morton** (5–3)	Bradford (0–1)	—	26,791	26–15	W1
42	May 16	@ Rangers	4–7	Dunning (4–0)	**Shuster** (0–2)	Smith (8)	23,246	26–16	L1
43	May 17	@ Rangers	6–5	**N. Anderson** (2–0)	Burke (2–2)	**Iglesias** (2)	30,053	27–16	W1
44	May 19	Mariners	6–2	**McHugh** (2–0)	Miller (2–1)	—	40,412	28–16	W2
45	May 20	Mariners	3–7	Gilbert (2–2)	**Tonkin** (3–2)	—	40,250	28–17	L1
46	May 21	Mariners	3–2	**Shuster** (1–2)	Kirby (5–3)	**Iglesias** (3)	40,213	29–17	W1
47	May 22	Dodgers	6–8	Phillips (1–0)	**Morton** (5–4)	Graterol (3)	40,205	29–18	L1
48	May 23	Dodgers	1–8	Miller (1–0)	**Strider** (4–2)	—	36,731	29–19	L2
49	May 24	Dodgers	4–3	**Iglesias** (1–1)	Bickford (1–2)	—	37,838	30–19	W1
50	May 25	Phillies	8–5	**N. Anderson** (3–0)	Soto (1–4)	**Iglesias** (4)	43,216	31–19	W2
51	May 26	Phillies	4–6	Walker (4–2)	**Jiménez** (0–1)	Kimbrel (6)	40,533	31–20	L1
52	May 27	Phillies	1–2	Wheeler (4–4)	**Morton** (5–5)	Kimbrel (7)	42,665	31–21	L2
53	May 28	Phillies	11–4	**Strider** (5–2)	Covey (0–1)	—	43,109	32–21	W1
54	May 29	@ Athletics	2–7	Erceg (1–0)	**Soroka** (0–1)	—	8,556	32–22	L1
55	May 30	@ Athletics	1–2	Fujinami (2–5)	**Iglesias** (1–2)	—	5,116	32–23	L2
56	May 31	@ Athletics	4–2	**Shuster** (2–2)	Kaprielian (0–6)	**Iglesias** (5)	6,429	33–23	W1

June: 21–4 (Home: 13–1; Away: 8–3)

#	Date	Opponent	Score	Win	Loss	Save	Attendance	Record	Streak
57	June 2	@ Diamondbacks	2–3	Kelly (7–3)	**Morton** (5–6)	Castro (6)	27,469	33–24	L1
58	June 3	@ Diamondbacks	5–2	**Strider** (6–2)	Nelson (2–3)	**Iglesias** (6)	36,529	34–24	W1
59	June 4	@ Diamondbacks	8–5	**Minter** (3–5)	Castro (3–2)	**Iglesias** (7)	32,401	35–24	W2
60	June 6	Mets	6–4	**Elder** (4–0)	Smith (3–2)	**Iglesias** (8)	37,365	36–24	W3
61	June 7	Mets	7–5	**N. Anderson** (4–0)	Raley (1–1)	**Minter** (8)	40,178	37–24	W4
62	June 8	Mets	13–10 (10)	**Iglesias** (2–2)	Hunter (0–1)	—	39,347	38–24	W5
63	June 9	Nationals	3–2	**Yates** (2–0)	Finnegan (3–3)	**Iglesias** (9)	40,297	39–24	W6
64	June 10	Nationals	6–4	**Shuster** (3–2)	Gore (3–5)	**Minter** (9)	40,799	40–24	W7
65	June 11	Nationals	2–6	Williams (3–4)	**Elder** (4–1)	—	36,744	40–25	L1
66	June 12	@ Tigers	5–6 (10)	Lange (4–2)	**Jiménez** (0–2)	—	18,742	40–26	L2
—	June 13	@ Tigers	Postponed (inclement weather); Makeup: June 14						
67	June 14 (1)	@ Tigers	10–7	**Strider** (7–2)	Olson (0–2)	—	see 2nd game	41–26	W1
68	June 14 (2)	@ Tigers	6–5	**McHugh** (3–0)	Lorenzen (2–4)	**Minter** (10)	24,186	42–26	W2
69	June 15	Rockies	8–3	**Smith-Shawver** (1–0)	Freeland (4–8)	**Tonkin** (1)	38,555	43–26	W3
70	June 16	Rockies	8–1	**Shuster** (4–2)	Lamet (1–4)	—	41,214	44–26	W4
71	June 17	Rockies	10–2	**Elder** (5–1)	Seabold (0–1)	—	41,558	45–26	W5
72	June 18	Rockies	14–6	**Morton** (6–6)	Anderson (0–1)	—	41,161	46–26	W6
73	June 20	@ Phillies	4–2	**Strider** (8–2)	Hoffman (0–1)	**Iglesias** (10)	37,746	47–26	W7
—	June 21	@ Phillies	Postponed (inclement weather); Makeup: September 11						
74	June 22	@ Phillies	5–1 (10)	**Iglesias** (3–2)	Marte (0–1)	—	39,570	48–26	W8
75	June 23	@ Reds	10–11	Young (3–0)	**McHugh** (3–1)	Díaz (21)	43,086	48–27	L1
76	June 24	@ Reds	7–6	**Tonkin** (4–2)	Ashcraft (3–6)	**Iglesias** (11)	43,498	49–27	W1
77	June 25	@ Reds	7–6	**Morton** (7–6)	Wynne (0–1)	**Iglesias** (12)	40,140	50–27	W2
78	June 26	Twins	4–1	**Strider** (9–2)	Gray (4–2)	**Yates** (1)	40,884	51–27	W3
79	June 27	Twins	6–2	**Elder** (6–1)	Ryan (8–5)	—	42,635	52–27	W4
80	June 28	Twins	3–0	**Yates** (3–0)	Maeda (1–5)	**Iglesias** (13)	38,260	53–27	W5
81	June 30	Marlins	16–4	**Soroka** (1–1)	Hoeing (1–2)	—	42,320	54–27	W6

July: 13–10 (Home: 7–5; Away: 6–5)

#	Date	Opponent	Score	Win	Loss	Save	Attendance	Record	Streak
82	July 1	Marlins	7–0	**Morton** (8–6)	Pérez (5–2)	—	41,889	55–27	W7
83	July 2	Marlins	6–3	**Strider** (10–2)	Alcántara (3–7)	**Iglesias** (14)	40,932	56–27	W8
84	July 3	@ Guardians	4–2	**Elder** (7–1)	Williams (0–1)	**Iglesias** (15)	38,106	57–27	W9
85	July 4	@ Guardians	5–6 (10)	De Los Santos (4–1)	**Iglesias** (3–3)	—	24,808	57–28	L1
86	July 5	@ Guardians	8–1	**Tonkin** (5–2)	Quantrill (2–6)	—	23,862	58–28	W1
87	July 7	@ Rays	2–1	**Morton** (9–6)	Glasnow (2–3)	**Iglesias** (16)	25,025	59–28	W2
88	July 8	@ Rays	6–1	**Strider** (11–2)	Bradley (5–5)	—	25,025	60–28	W3
89	July 9	@ Rays	4–10	Eflin (10–4)	**Elder** (7–2)	—	25,025	60–29	L1
–	July 11	**93rd All-Star Game: Seattle, WA**							
90	July 14	White Sox	9–0	**Morton** (10–6)	Kopech (3–8)	—	42,782	61–29	W1
91	July 15	White Sox	5–6	Lynn (6–8)	**Strider** (11–3)	Graveman (8)	43,344	61–30	L1
92	July 16	White Sox	1–8	Cease (4–3)	**Allard** (0–1)	—	40,174	61–31	L2
93	July 18	Diamondbacks	13–16	Castro (5–3)	**Iglesias** (3–4)	Ginkel (1)	41,100	61–32	L3
94	July 19	Diamondbacks	3–5	Nelson (6–5)	**Morton** (10–7)	Ginkel (2)	41,992	61–33	L4
95	July 20	Diamondbacks	7–5	**Yates** (4–0)	Castro (5–4)	**Iglesias** (17)	38,791	62–33	W1
96	July 21	@ Brewers	6–4	**Soroka** (2–1)	Peralta (6–8)	**Yates** (2)	37,698	63–33	W2
97	July 22	@ Brewers	3–4	Payamps (4–1)	**Jiménez** (0–3)	Williams (25)	39,707	63–34	L1
98	July 23	@ Brewers	4–2	**Hernández** (1–0)	Peguero (1–3)	**Iglesias** (18)	38,605	64–34	W1
99	July 25	@ Red Sox	1–7	Pivetta (7–5)	**Morton** (10–8)	—	36,663	64–35	L1
100	July 26	@ Red Sox	3–5	Jacques (2–1)	**Johnson** (1–6)	Jansen (22)	37,457	64–36	W1
101	July 28	Brewers	10–7	**McHugh** (4–1)	Houser (3–3)	**Iglesias** (19)	42,502	65–36	W2
102	July 29	Brewers	11–5	**Elder** (8–2)	Teherán (2–5)	—	43,276	66–36	W3
103	July 30	Brewers	8–6	**Yates** (5–0)	Payamps (4–2)	**Iglesias** (20)	40,262	67–36	W4
104	July 31	Angels	1–4	Silseth (3–1)	**Morton** (10–9)	López (5)	41,173	67–37	L1

August: 21–8 (Home: 9–2; Away: 12–6)

#	Date	Opponent	Score	Win	Loss	Save	Attendance	Record	Streak
105	August 1	Angels	5–1	**Strider** (12–3)	Sandoval (6–8)	—	41,777	68–37	W1
106	August 2	Angels	12–5	**Chirinos** (5–4)	Giolito (6–8)	—	36,495	69–37	W2
107	August 4	@ Cubs	8–0	**Fried** (3–1)	Hendricks (4–6)	—	36,225	70–37	W3
108	August 5	@ Cubs	6–8	Fulmer (3–5)	**Elder** (8–3)	—	40,201	70–38	L1
109	August 6	@ Cubs	4–6	Steele (13–3)	**Morton** (10–10)	Alzolay (14)	39,015	70–39	L2
110	August 7	@ Pirates	6–7	Mlodzinski (2–2)	**Strider** (12–4)	Bednar (23)	14,627	70–40	L3
111	August 8	@ Pirates	8–6	**Yates** (6–0)	Bednar (3–2)	**Iglesias** (21)	15,583	71–40	W1
112	August 9	@ Pirates	6–5	**Johnson** (2–6)	Mlodzinski (2–3)	**Iglesias** (22)	17,639	72–40	W2
113	August 10	@ Pirates	5–7	Hatch (1–0)	**Elder** (8–4)	Holderman (2)	16,550	72–41	L1
114	August 11	@ Mets	7–0	**Morton** (11–10)	Megill (6–6)	—	37,339	73–41	W1
115	August 12 (1)	@ Mets	21–3	**Winans** (1–0)	Reyes (0–2)	—	39,859	74–41	W2
116	August 12 (2)	@ Mets	6–0	**Strider** (13–4)	Quintana (0–4)	—	30,254	75–41	W3
117	August 13	@ Mets	6–7	Senga (9–6)	**Chirinos** (5–5)	Ottavino (7)	30,338	75–42	L1
118	August 14	Yankees	11–3	**Fried** (4–1)	Schmidt (8–7)	—	42,717	76–42	W1
119	August 15	Yankees	5–0	**Elder** (9–4)	Severino (2–8)	—	40,454	77–42	W2
120	August 16	Yankees	2–0	**Morton** (12–10)	Vásquez (2–2)	**Iglesias** (23)	40,743	78–42	W3
121	August 18	Giants	4–0	**Strider** (14–4)	Cobb (6–5)	—	40,688	79–42	W4
122	August 19	Giants	6–5	**Yates** (7–0)	Rogers (4–5)	**Iglesias** (24)	42,744	80–42	W5
123	August 20	Giants	3–4	Doval (5–3)	**Yates** (7–1)	—	40,291	80–43	L1
124	August 21	Mets	4–10	Bickford (3–4)	**Winans** (1–1)	—	33,216	80–44	L2
125	August 22	Mets	3–2	**Elder** (10–4)	Megill (7–7)	**Iglesias** (25)	36,841	81–44	W1
126	August 23	Mets	7–0	**Morton** (13–10)	Quintana (1–5)	—	35,674	82–44	W2
127	August 25	@ Giants	5–1	**Strider** (15–4)	Webb (9–10)	—	36,511	83–44	W3
128	August 26	@ Giants	7–3	**Fried** (5–1)	Manaea (4–5)	—	36,798	84–44	W4
129	August 27	@ Giants	5–8	Alexander (7–2)	**Shuster** (4–3)	Doval (34)	31,047	84–45	L1
130	August 28	@ Rockies	14–4	**Elder** (11–4)	Kauffmann (1–4)	—	27,024	85–45	W1
131	August 29	@ Rockies	3–1	**Morton** (14–10)	Lambert (3–5)	**Iglesias** (26)	25,244	86–45	W2
132	August 30	@ Rockies	7–3	**Vines** (1–0)	Freeland (5–14)	—	27,425	87–45	W3
133	August 31	@ Dodgers	8–7	**Strider** (16–4)	Lynn (10–10)	**Iglesias** (27)	47,623	88–45	W4

September/October: 16–13 (Home: 8–7; Away: 8–6)

#	Date	Opponent	Score	Win	Loss	Save	Attendance	Record	Streak
134	September 1	@ Dodgers	6–3	**Fried** (6–1)	Urías (11–8)	**Yates** (3)	52,436	89–45	W5
135	September 2	@ Dodgers	4–2 (10)	**Tonkin** (6–2)	Vesia (0–5)	**Iglesias** (28)	51,470	90–45	W6
136	September 3	@ Dodgers	1–3	Miller (9–3)	**Morton** (14–11)	Graterol (7)	47,499	90–46	L1
137	September 5	Cardinals	6–10	Mikolas (7–10)	**Soroka** (2–2)	—	33,553	90–47	L2
138	September 6	Cardinals	6–11	Hudson (6–1)	**Strider** (16–5)	—	35,514	90–48	L3
139	September 7	Cardinals	8–5	**Fried** (7–1)	Wainwright (3–11)	—	34,349	91–48	W1
140	September 8	Pirates	8–2	**Elder** (12–4)	Keller (11–9)	—	40,452	92–48	W2
141	September 9	Pirates	4–8	Borucki (2–0)	**Dodd** (2–2)	—	42,866	92–49	L1
142	September 10	Pirates	5–2	**Hand** (4–1)	Selby (2–1)	**Iglesias** (29)	39,071	93–49	W1
143	September 11 (1)	@ Phillies	10–8 (10)	**Iglesias** (4–4)	Alvarado (0–2)	**Yates** (4)	30,572	94–49	W2
144	September 11 (2)	@ Phillies	5–7	Lorenzen (9–9)	**Wright** (0–2)	Kimbrel (23)	27,025	94–50	L1
145	September 12	@ Phillies	7–6 (10)	**Iglesias** (5–4)	Kimbrel (7–6)	**Hand** (1)	28,683	95–50	W1
146	September 13	@ Phillies	4–1	**Strider** (17–5)	Sánchez (2–4)	**Yates** (5)	31,333	96–50	W2
—	September 14	@ Phillies	Rescheduled (Eagles vs Vikings at Lincoln Financial Field); Moved to September 11						
147	September 15	@ Marlins	6–9	Puk (6–5)	**Hand** (4–2)	Scott (9)	17,692	96–51	L1
148	September 16	@ Marlins	5–11	Scott (8–4)	**Yates** (7–2)	—	24,329	96–52	L2
149	September 17	@ Marlins	2–16	Luzardo (10–9)	**Morton** (14–12)	—	22,051	96–53	L3
150	September 18	Phillies	1–7	Wheeler (12–6)	**Wright** (0–3)	—	39,216	96–54	L4
151	September 19	Phillies	9–3	**Strider** (18–5)	Sánchez (2–5)	—	40,695	97–54	W1
152	September 20	Phillies	5–6 (10)	Kimbrel (8–6)	**Minter** (3–6)	Strahm (2)	38,856	97–55	L1
153	September 21	@ Nationals	10–3	**Fried** (8–1)	Irvin (3–7)	—	28,100	98–55	W1
154	September 22	@ Nationals	9–6	**Tonkin** (7–2)	Corbin (10–14)	**Iglesias** (30)	36,297	99–55	W2
—	September 23	@ Nationals	Postponed (rain); Makeup: September 24						
155	September 24 (1)	@ Nationals	2–3	Rutledge (1–1)	**Winans** (1–2)	Finnegan (27)	31,989	99–56	L1
156	September 24 (2)	@ Nationals	8–5	**Strider** (19–5)	Adon (2–4)	—	34,501	100–56	W1
157	September 26	Cubs	7–6	**Hand** (5–2)	Smyly (11–10)	**Iglesias** (31)	40,151	101–56	W2
158	September 27	Cubs	6–5 (10)	**Chavez** (1–0)	Palencia (5–3)	—	37,246	102–56	W3
159	September 28	Cubs	5–3	**Wright** (1–3)	Stroman (10–9)	**Iglesias** (32)	40,249	103–56	W4
160	September 29	Nationals	6–10	Weems (5–0)	**Hand** (5–3)	—	41,481	103–57	L1
161	September 30	Nationals	5–3	**Strider** (20–5)	Weems (5–1)	**Iglesias** (33)	41,652	104–57	W1
162	October 1	Nationals	9–10	Harvey (4–4)	**Tonkin** (7–3)	Finnegan (28)	40,697	104–58	L1

== Postseason ==
=== Game log ===
2023 Postseason Game Log: 1–3 (Home: 1–1; Away: 0–2)
NLDS: 1–3 (Home: 1–1; Away: 0–2)

#	Date	Opponent	Score	Win	Loss	Save	Attendance	Series
1	October 7	Phillies	0–3	Hoffman (1–0)	Strider (0–1)	Kimbrel (2)	43,689	0–1
2	October 9	Phillies	5–4	Minter (1–0)	Hoffman (1–1)	Iglesias (1)	43,898	1–1
3	October 11	@ Phillies	2–10	Nola (2–0)	Elder (0–1)	—	45,798	1–2
4	October 12	@ Phillies	1–3	Suárez (1–0)	Strider (0–2)	Strahm (1)	45,831	1–3

=== Postseason rosters ===
Playoff rosters
National League Division Series

- Pitchers: 22 Kirby Yates 26 Raisel Iglesias 33 A. J. Minter 38 Pierce Johnson 45 Brad Hand 51 Michael Tonkin 54 Max Fried 55 Bryce Elder 62 AJ Smith-Shawver 75 Daysbel Hernández 77 Joe Jiménez 99 Spencer Strider
- Catchers: 12 Sean Murphy 16 Travis d'Arnaud
- Infielders: 1 Ozzie Albies 11 Orlando Arcia 15 Nicky Lopez 18 Vaughn Grissom 27 Austin Riley 28 Matt Olson
- Outfielders: 8 Eddie Rosario 13 Ronald Acuña Jr. 17 Kevin Pillar 23 Michael Harris II 73 Forrest Wall
- Designated hitters: 20 Marcell Ozuna

== Roster ==
2023 Atlanta Braves
Roster
Pitchers: 49 Kolby Allard; 61 Nick Anderson; 60 Jesse Chavez; 56 Yonny Chirinos; 46 Dylan Dodd; 55 Bryce Elder; 54 Max Fried; 45 Brad Hand; 78 Taylor Hearn; 71 Ben Heller; 75 Daysbel Hernández; 26 Raisel Iglesias; 21,77 Joe Jiménez; 38,76 Pierce Johnson; 52 Dylan Lee; 63 Lucas Luetge; 32 Collin McHugh; 33 A. J. Minter; 50 Charlie Morton; 59 Dereck Rodríguez; 45,53,65 Jared Shuster; 62 AJ Smith-Shawver; 40 Michael Soroka; 53 Jackson Stephens; 99 Spencer Strider; 51 Michael Tonkin; 64 Darius Vines; 72 Allan Winans; 30 Kyle Wright; 22 Kirby Yates; 65 Danny Young	Catchers: 16 Travis d'Arnaud; 12 Sean Murphy; 48 Chadwick Tromp; Infielders: 9 Ehire Adrianza; 1 Ozzie Albies; 11 Orlando Arcia; 18 Vaughn Grissom; 15,21 Nicky Lopez; 28 Matt Olson; 27 Austin Riley; 24 Braden Shewmake; 67 Luke Williams	Outfielders: 13 Ronald Acuña Jr.; 23 Michael Harris II; 14 Sam Hilliard; 20 Marcell Ozuna; 17 Kevin Pillar; 8 Eddie Rosario; 73 Forrest Wall; 38 Eli White; Other batters: 53 Charlie Culberson; Other runners: 15 Nick Solak	Manager: 43 Brian Snitker; Coaches: 57 Sal Fasano (catching coach); 58 Drew French (bullpen); 10 Chipper Jones (hitting consultant); 39 Rick Kranitz (pitching); 97 Jimmy Leo (bullpen catcher); 70 Bobby Magallanes (assistant hitting); 95 Eddie Pérez (assistant); 98 Tomás Pérez (batting practice pitcher); 34 Kevin Seitzer (hitting); 37 Ron Washington (third base); 4 Walt Weiss (bench); 96 José Yepez (bullpen catcher); 2 Eric Young Sr. (first base)

== Player statistics ==
= Indicates team leader

=== Batting ===
Note: G = Games played; AB = At bats; R = Runs; H = Hits; 2B = Doubles; 3B = Triples; HR = Home runs; RBI = Runs batted in; SB = Stolen bases; BB = Walks; AVG = Batting average; SLG = Slugging average

Player	G	AB	R	H	2B	3B	HR	RBI	SB	BB	AVG	SLG
Ronald Acuña, Jr.	159	643	149	217	35	4	41	106	73	80	.337	.596
Austin Riley	159	636	117	179	32	3	37	97	3	59	.281	.516
Matt Olson	162	608	127	172	27	3	54	139	1	104	.283	.604
Ozzie Albies	148	596	96	167	30	5	33	109	13	46	.280	.513
Marcell Ozuna	144	530	84	145	29	1	40	100	0	57	.274	.558
Michael Harris II	138	505	76	148	33	3	18	57	20	25	.293	.477
Orlando Arcia	139	488	66	129	25	0	17	65	1	39	.264	.420
Eddie Rosario	142	478	64	122	24	3	21	74	3	34	.255	.450
Sean Murphy	108	370	65	93	21	0	21	68	0	49	.251	.478
Travis d'Arnaud	74	267	31	60	13	0	11	39	0	21	.225	.397
Kevin Pillar	81	197	29	45	10	0	9	32	4	6	.228	.416
Vaughn Grissom	23	75	5	21	3	1	0	9	0	2	.280	.347
Sam Hilliard	40	72	15	17	5	0	3	6	4	6	.236	.431
Nicky Lopez	25	65	13	18	3	0	1	12	2	5	.277	.369
Chadwick Tromp	6	16	1	2	1	0	0	1	0	0	.125	.188
Eli White	6	14	1	1	0	0	0	0	0	2	.071	.071
Forrest Wall	15	13	6	6	2	0	1	2	5	2	.462	.846
Ehire Adrianza	5	10	0	0	0	0	0	0	0	1	.000	.000
Luke Williams	7	9	1	0	0	0	0	0	3	0	.000	.000
Braden Shewmake	2	4	0	0	0	0	0	0	0	0	.000	.000
Charlie Culberson	1	1	0	1	0	0	0	0	0	0	1.000	1.000
Nick Solak	1	0	1	0	0	0	0	0	0	0	.---	.---
Totals	162	5597	947	1543	293	23	307	916	132	538	.276	.501
Rank in NL	—	1	1	1	3	8	1	1	6	11	1	1

Source:Baseball Reference

=== Pitching ===
Note: W = Wins; L = Losses; ERA = Earned run average; G = Games pitched; GS = Games started; SV = Saves; IP = Innings pitched; H = Hits allowed; R = Runs allowed; ER = Earned runs allowed; BB = Walks allowed; SO = Strikeouts

Player	W	L	ERA	G	GS	SV	IP	H	R	ER	BB	SO
Spencer Strider	20	5	3.86	32	32	0	186.2	146	85	80	58	281
Bryce Elder	12	4	3.81	31	31	0	174.2	160	79	74	63	128
Charlie Morton	14	12	3.64	30	30	0	163.1	150	70	66	83	183
Michael Tonkin	7	3	4.28	45	0	1	80.0	64	41	38	23	75
Max Fried	8	1	2.55	14	14	0	77.2	70	24	22	18	80
A. J. Minter	3	6	3.76	70	0	10	64.2	56	28	27	21	82
Kirby Yates	7	2	3.28	61	0	5	60.1	35	22	22	37	80
Collin McHugh	4	1	4.30	41	1	0	58.2	70	34	28	22	47
Joe Jiménez	0	3	3.04	59	0	0	56.1	51	22	19	14	73
Raisel Iglesias	5	4	2.75	58	0	33	55.2	51	23	17	15	68
Jared Shuster	4	3	5.81	11	11	0	52.2	53	34	34	26	30
Nick Anderson	4	0	3.06	35	0	1	35.1	30	14	12	9	36
Jesse Chavez	1	0	1.56	36	1	1	34.2	26	10	6	12	39
Dylan Dodd	2	2	7.60	7	7	0	34.1	53	29	29	12	15
Michael Soroka	2	2	6.40	7	6	0	32.1	36	23	23	12	29
Allan Winans	1	2	5.29	6	6	0	32.1	37	19	19	8	34
Kyle Wright	1	3	6.97	9	7	0	31.0	40	26	24	17	34
AJ Smith-Shawver	1	0	4.26	6	5	0	25.1	17	14	12	11	20
Pierce Johnson	1	1	0.76	24	0	0	23.2	16	6	2	5	32
Dylan Lee	1	0	4.18	24	1	0	23.2	24	14	11	8	24
Yonny Chirinos	1	1	9.27	5	5	0	22.1	33	23	23	7	22
Darius Vines	1	0	3.98	5	2	0	20.1	15	10	9	7	14
Ben Heller	0	0	3.86	19	0	0	18.2	16	9	8	11	16
Brad Hand	2	2	7.50	20	0	1	18.0	19	15	15	6	18
Lucas Luetge	1	0	7.24	12	0	0	13.2	17	11	11	7	14
Kolby Allard	0	1	6.57	4	3	0	12.1	16	9	9	4	13
Jackson Stephens	0	0	3.00	5	0	0	12.0	13	4	4	5	11
Danny Young	0	0	1.08	8	0	0	8.1	7	1	1	2	11
Dereck Rodríguez	0	0	15.43	3	0	0	4.2	8	8	8	4	1
Daysbel Hernández	1	0	7.36	4	0	0	3.2	6	3	3	3	6
Nicky Lopez	0	0	7.71	2	0	0	2.1	4	2	2	2	0
Taylor Hearn	0	0	108.00	1	0	0	0.1	2	4	4	2	0
Totals	104	58	4.14	162	162	52	1440.0	1341	716	662	534	1516
Rank in NL	1	15	7	—	—	2	5	8	5	7	9	1

Source:Baseball Reference

== Farm system ==
Level	Team	League	Manager
AAA	Gwinnett Stripers	International League	Matt Tuiasosopo
AA	Mississippi Braves	Southern League	Kanekoa Teixeira
High-A	Rome Braves	South Atlantic League	Angel Flores
A	Augusta GreenJackets	Carolina League	Cody Gabella
Rookie	FCL Braves	Florida Complex League	
Rookie	DSL Braves	Dominican Summer League	
