= Bryce Elder =

American baseball player (born 1999)

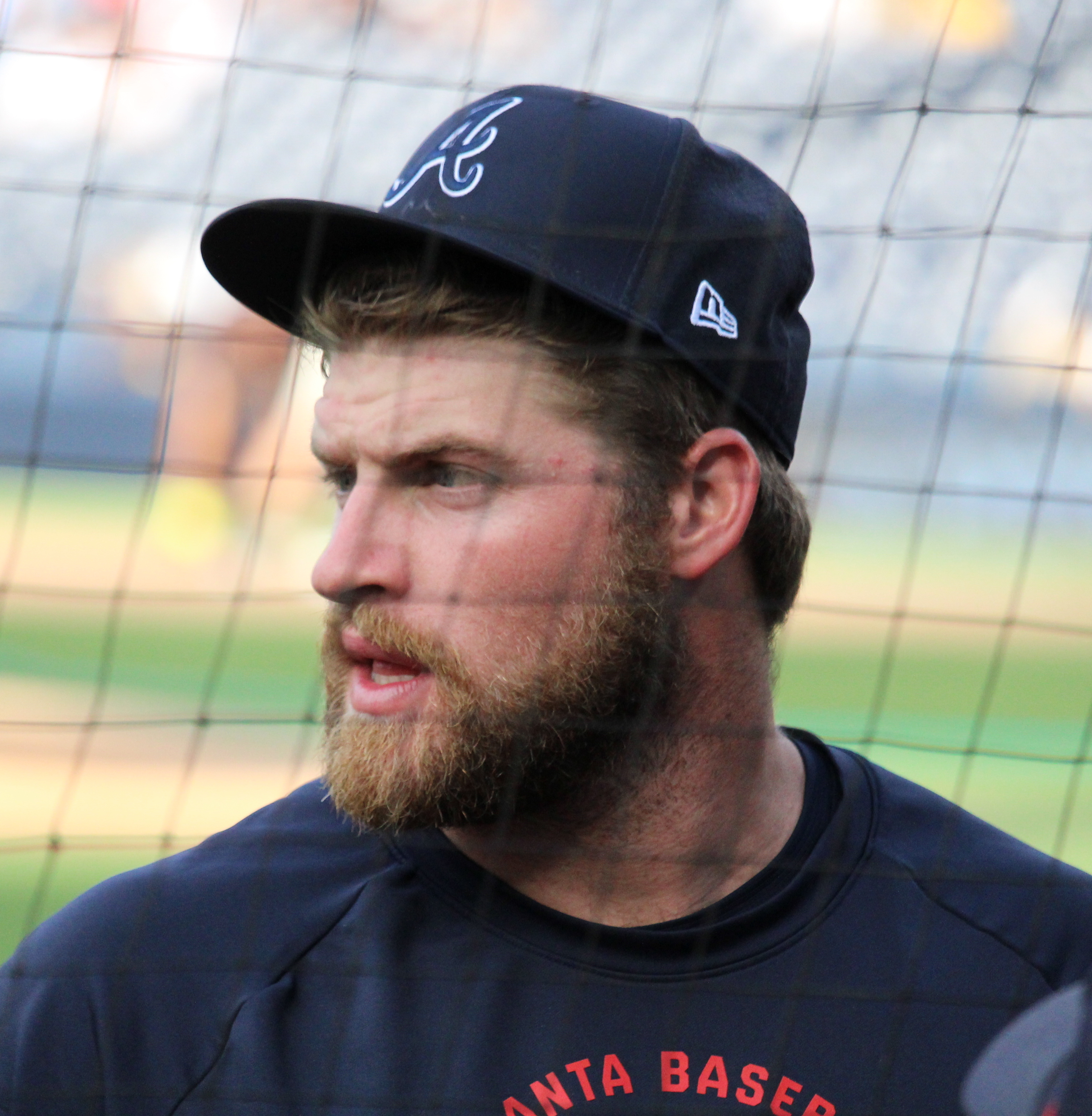
- Elder with the Braves in 2026

Atlanta Braves – No. 55
- Pitcher
- Born: May 19, 1999 (age 27); Decatur, Texas, U.S.
- Bats: Right Throws: Right

MLB debut
- April 12, 2022, for the Atlanta Braves

MLB statistics (through 2026 season)
- Win–loss record: 32–32
- Earned run average: 4.46
- Strikeouts: 473
- Stats at Baseball Reference

Teams
- Atlanta Braves (2022–present)

Career highlights and awards
- All-Star (2023)

Bryce Cason Elder (born May 19, 1999) is an American professional baseball pitcher for the Atlanta Braves of Major League Baseball (MLB). Elder played college baseball at the University of Texas at Austin and was drafted by the Braves in the fifth round of the 2020 MLB draft. He made his MLB debut in 2022. Elder was named to his first All-Star game in 2023.

== Amateur career ==
Elder began playing baseball as a child, but stopped to focus on golf by his fifth grade year, to free up his weekends from travel team baseball activities. As a freshman at Decatur High School in Decatur, Texas, Elder considered returning to baseball, but the coach at the time would not permit Elder to play two spring season sports. A new baseball coach, hired before Elder's sophomore season, agreed to Elder's request to play baseball and golf. Elder also played basketball.

After graduating from high school, Elder enrolled at the University of Texas at Austin to play college baseball for the Texas Longhorns, and had a 10–6 win–loss record with a 3.42 earned run average (ERA). In 2019, he played collegiate summer baseball with the Wareham Gatemen of the Cape Cod Baseball League.

== Professional career ==
The Atlanta Braves selected Elder in the fifth round of the 2020 Major League Baseball draft, and he signed with the team for $850,000. Elder made his professional debut in 2021 with the Rome Braves and was promoted to the Double-A Mississippi Braves and the Triple-A Gwinnett Stripers during the season. On July 10, 2021, Elder threw a combined no-hitter with Daysbel Hernandez. Over 25 starts between the three teams, Elder went 11–5 with a 2.75 ERA and 155 strikeouts over 137 2/3 innings.

On April 12, 2022, Elder was selected to the 40-man roster and promoted to the major leagues for the first time to make a spot start. He faced the Washington Nationals that night, pitching 5 2/3 innings, and earned a win. He was optioned to the Gwinnett Stripers on May 1. He was recalled on August 13 to face the Miami Marlins in another spot start the next day. On September 26, Elder threw a complete-game shutout against the Washington Nationals, becoming the first Braves' rookie pitcher to do so since Paul Marak during the 1990 season. For the 2022 regular season, he pitched 54 innings to a 2–4 record with a 3.17 ERA.

In 2023, after impressive spring training performances by Jared Shuster and Dylan Dodd, Elder was optioned to Triple-A Gwinnett to begin the regular season. After one start in Triple-A, he was called up to make his season debut on April 5, which he won. At midseason, Elder was selected for the first time as a reserve starting pitcher for the National League in the 2023 Major League Baseball All-Star Game.

In 2024, Elder began the season in Triple-A Gwinnett after not being able to secure the fifth spot in the Braves rotation. On April 22, Elder was called up to the Braves' roster to replace Darius Vines. In 10 starts for Atlanta, he struggled to a 2–5 record and 6.52 ERA with 46 strikeouts across 49 2/3 innings pitched.

Elder was optioned to Triple-A Gwinnett to begin the 2025 season. He was recalled on March 31 in place of Reynaldo López.

On September 8, 2026, Elder was ruled out for 3–to–4 weeks after undergoing surgery to remove bone fragments from his right knee.

== Pitching style ==
Elder throws five pitches: a sinker, four-seam fastball, slider, changeup and curveball.
