= Jared Shuster =

American baseball player (born 1998)

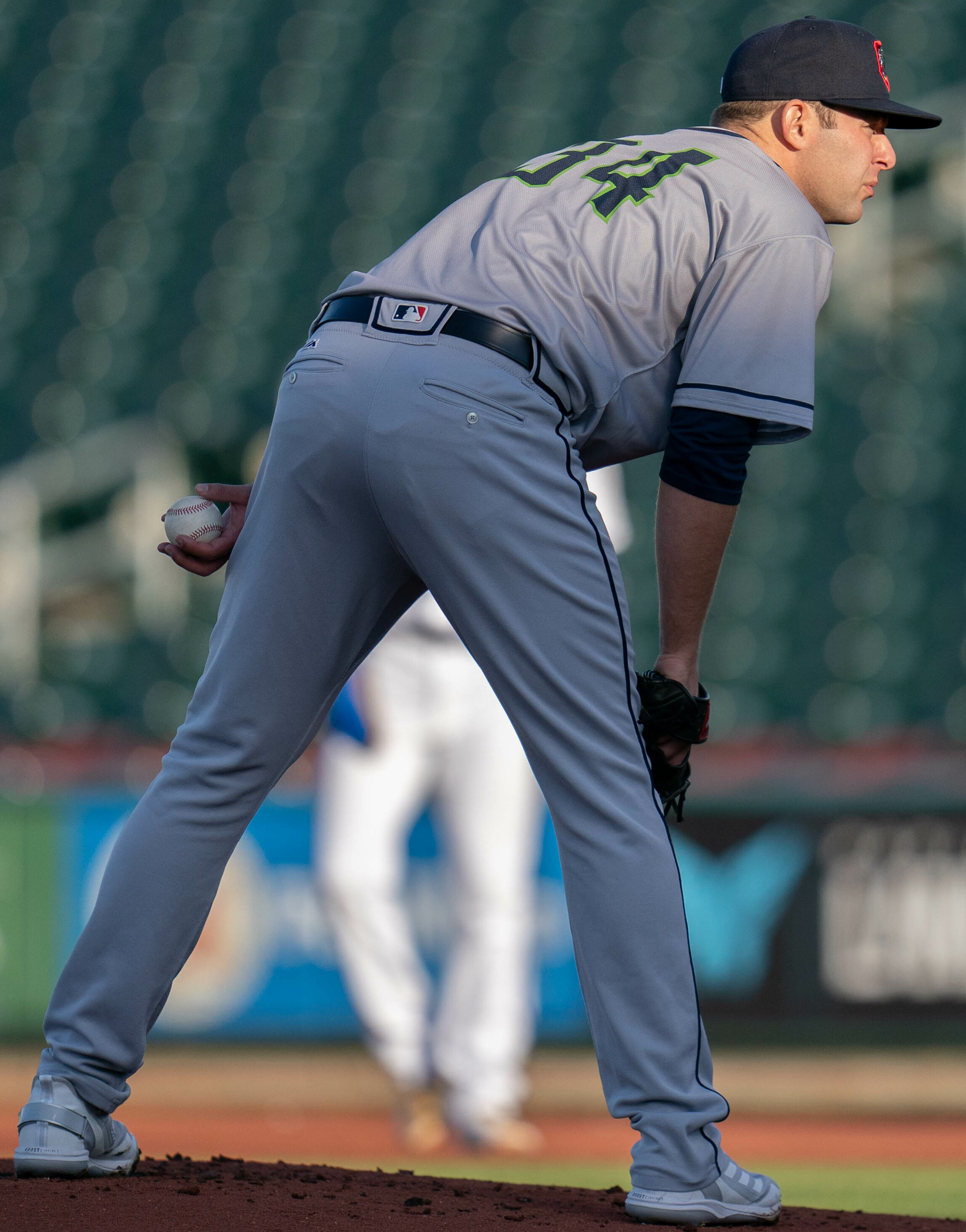
- Shuster with the Gwinnett Stripers in 2023

Free agent
- Pitcher
- Born: August 3, 1998 (age 28); New Bedford, Massachusetts, U.S.
- Bats: Left Throws: Left

MLB debut
- April 2, 2023, for the Atlanta Braves

MLB statistics (through 2026 season)
- Win–loss record: 6–8
- Earned run average: 5.50
- Strikeouts: 102
- Stats at Baseball Reference

Teams
- Atlanta Braves (2023); Chicago White Sox (2024–2025); St. Louis Cardinals (2026)

Jared Craig Shuster (born August 3, 1998) is an American professional baseball pitcher who is a free agent. He has previously played in Major League Baseball (MLB) for the Atlanta Braves, Chicago White Sox and St. Louis Cardinals. He played college baseball at Wake Forest University. The Braves selected him in the first round of the 2020 MLB draft, and he made his MLB debut with them in 2023.

== Amateur career ==
=== High school ===
Shuster attended New Bedford High School before transferring to Tabor Academy in Marion, Massachusetts, graduating in 2017. He had a 6–0 win–loss record with an 0.45 earned run average (ERA) as a freshman at New Bedford High School, throwing in the mid-80s and touching the high-80s. Then at Tabor Academy, he was 2–1 with a 1.88 ERA as a sophomore, 3–2 with a 2.40 ERA as a junior, and 4–3 with a 1.26 ERA and 64 strikeouts in 39 innings pitched as a senior while he was captain of the team. As a junior he batted .506 with nine doubles and six home runs in 25 games, and as a senior both pitching and playing outfield he batted .347 with four home runs. He also played basketball.

=== College ===
Shuster played college baseball at Wake Forest University for the Demon Deacons. As a freshman he was 0–3 with a 7.41 ERA, and as a sophomore he was 4–4 with a 6.49 ERA while striking out 94 batters in 68 innings (12.4 K/9IP, the third-highest ratio in school history) and was twice named Atlantic Coast Conference Pitcher of the Week. As a junior in 2020 in a season shortened by COVID he was 2–1 with a 3.76 ERA, as in four starts he struck out 43 batters (tied for third in the ACC) and walked 4 in 26 1/3 innings (14.7 K/9IP), and had 10.75 strikeouts per walk (second), holding batters to a .221 batting average.

After the 2018 season, he played collegiate summer baseball with the New Bedford Bay Sox of the New England Collegiate Baseball League, and was 2–4 with a 2.76 ERA and a league-leading 62 strikeouts in 49 innings. After the 2019 season, Shuster played collegiate summer baseball with the Orleans Firebirds of the Cape Cod Baseball League, and was 4–0 with a 1.36 ERA with 36 strikeouts (6th in the league) and 5 walks in 33 innings, and was named a league All-Star.

His sinking two-seam and riding four-seam fastball was 92–94 mph and hit 97 mph, and Shuster's best pitch was his 80 mph changeup (that he throws over 10 miles per hour slower than his fastball, and which he throws in any count), which produced a 60% whiff rate. He also had an improving slider.

== Professional career ==
=== Atlanta Braves ===
The Atlanta Braves selected Shuster in the first round, with the 25th pick, of the 2020 Major League Baseball draft. He was the seventh first-round draft pick in Wake Forest history. He signed for a signing bonus of $2,197,500; because the 2020 season was uncertain, 2020 draft picks received a maximum of $100,000 up front, and the rest of their bonus was to be deferred over the following two years. Shuster's signing bonus was regarded as under slot, and the Braves reallocated the savings to sign Bryce Elder. Shuster was included in the Braves' pool of 60 players eligible to participate in the 2020 regular season, which was shortened due to the COVID-19 pandemic, but did not play.

Shuster started the 2021 season at the Single-A level with the Rome Braves. In September 2021, Shuster was promoted to the Double-A Mississippi Braves. Between the two teams, in 2021 he was 2–0 with a 4.44 ERA, as in 73 innings he struck out 90 batters (11.1 strikeouts per 9 innings). He was named a 2021 MiLB.com Organization All-Star.

Shuster was placed on the Mississippi Braves 2022 Opening Day roster after spending some time at minor league spring training camp. On April 16, 2022, Shuster struck out eight consecutive Biloxi Shuckers' batters, which tied a Southern League record. Mid-season, he was a 2022 All-Star Futures Game selection. He was named a Southern League Post-Season All-Star. With Mississippi, he was 6–7 with one save and a 2.78 ERA (10th in the league) in 17 games (16 starts) covering 90 2/3 innings, in which he gave up 65 hits and 22 walks, and had 106 strikeouts and an 0.960 WHIP (6th), with 4.82 strikeouts/walk (7th). He then pitched for the Triple-A Gwinnett Stripers in the International League, and was 1–3 with a 4.25 ERA in 10 games (9 starts) in which he pitched 48 2/3 innings. He was named an MiLB Organization All-Star for the second straight season.

Shuster began 2023 rated as the No. 1 prospect in the Braves organization by mlb.com. In spring training prior to the 2023 regular season, Shuster competed with Dylan Dodd for the fifth spot in the Atlanta Braves’ starting rotation. On March 26, 2023, after Kyle Wright was placed on the injured list, it was announced that both Shuster and Dodd had made the Opening Day roster and would pitch out of the rotation for the time being. Shuster lost his major league debut against the Washington Nationals on April 2, pitching 4 2/3 innings, and yielding four earned runs, all during the first inning. On May 21, Shuster gained his first win, giving up only one hit and one walk along with seven strikeouts in six innings in a game against the Seattle Mariners. In 2023 with the Braves, Shuster was 4–3 with a 5.81 ERA and 30 strikeouts in 11 starts covering 52 2/3 innings.

=== Chicago White Sox ===
On November 16, 2023, the Braves traded Shuster to the Chicago White Sox, along with Michael Soroka, Nicky Lopez, Braden Shewmake and Riley Gowens in exchange for Aaron Bummer. He was optioned to the Triple-A Charlotte Knights to begin the 2024 season. On April 8, 2024, Shuster was called up to the White Sox's roster and made his White Sox debut the same day, pitching 3 innings as a reliever against the Cleveland Guardians. Shuster was optioned to Triple-A on April 16, was called back up to the White Sox's roster for a doubleheader against the Kansas City Royals, but saw no action and was optioned again to Triple-A on April 17. On May 1, Shuster was again called up to the White Sox's major league roster. Shuster made 39 appearances (4 starts) for the White Sox during the 2024 campaign, compiling a 2–5 record and 4.30 ERA with 56 strikeouts across 73 1/3 innings pitched.

Shuster was optioned to Triple-A Charlotte to begin the 2025 season. On April 19, after Martín Pérez was placed on the White Sox's injured list, Shuster was called up to the White Sox's roster. Shuster was optioned to Triple-A on May 16 to make room for newly acquired pitcher Miguel Castro, but was called back up a day later following Tyler Gilbert being placed on the White Sox's injured list. On June 8, Shuster was placed on the 15-day injured list due to a blister on his left hand. Shuster began his rehab assignment with Triple-A on July 2 and was removed from the injured list on July 11 but lost his spot on the White Sox's roster and remained in Triple-A. In 12 appearances for Chicago, he struggled to an 8.04 ERA with 12 strikeouts across 15 2/3 innings pitched. Shuster was designated for assignment by the White Sox on August 13.

=== Athletics ===
On August 15, 2025, Shuster was claimed off waivers by the Athletics; he was subsequently optioned to the Triple-A Las Vegas Aviators. In 10 appearances for the Aviators, he struggled to an 0–2 record and 8.53 ERA with seven strikeouts across 12 2/3 innings pitched. On November 5, Shuster was removed from the 40-man roster and sent outright to Las Vegas. He was released by the Athletics organization on December 10.

=== St. Louis Cardinals ===
On December 22, 2025, Shuster signed a minor league contract with the St. Louis Cardinals. He was assigned to the Triple-A Memphis Redbirds to begin the season. On April 5, 2026, the Cardinals selected Shuster's contract, adding him to their active roster. He made two appearances for the team, recording a 4.91 ERA with one strikeout across 3 2/3 innings pitched. On April 13, Shuster was designated for assignment by the Cardinals. He cleared waivers and was sent outright to Memphis on April 16. On May 1, the Cardinals added Shuster back to their active roster. He recorded four scoreless innings across two appearances for St. Louis prior to being designated for assignment again on May 16. Shuster cleared waivers and returned to Memphis via an outright assignment on May 18. On July 7, the Cardinals added Shuster back to their active roster. Pitching in relief against the Milwaukee Brewers, he allowed seven earned runs across 1 1/3 innings. Shuster was designated for assignment by the Cardinals the following day; he cleared waivers and was sent outright to Memphis on July 11. He elected free agency on September 29.

== Personal life ==
Shuster is the son of Bennett and Lori Shuster, and is Jewish. He has a sister, Alexa. His hometown is New Bedford, Massachusetts. He is 6 feet 3 inches (1.91 m), and 210 pounds (95 kg), and is considered athletic, as he runs a 6.5 second 60-yard dash. As a child, Shuster's favorite Major League Baseball team was the Boston Red Sox.

== See also ==
- List of Jewish Major League Baseball players
