= Nick Solak =

American baseball player (born 1995)

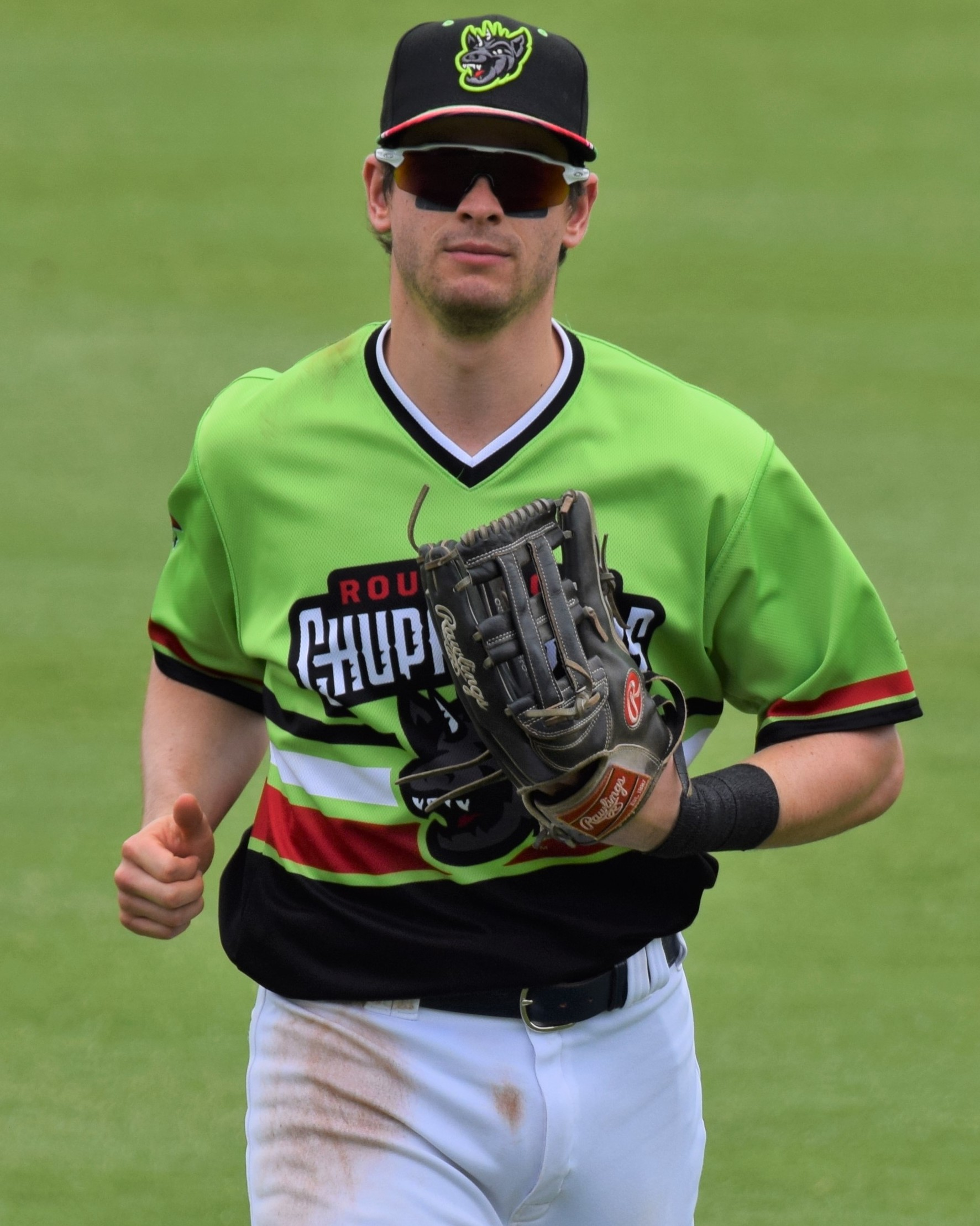
- Solak with the Round Rock Express in 2022

Free agent
- Second baseman / Outfielder
- Born: January 11, 1995 (age 31); Woodridge, Illinois, U.S.
- Bats: Right Throws: Right

MLB debut
- August 20, 2019, for the Texas Rangers

MLB statistics (through 2026 season)
- Batting average: .249
- Home runs: 21
- Runs batted in: 94
- Stats at Baseball Reference

Teams
- Texas Rangers (2019–2022); Atlanta Braves (2023); Detroit Tigers (2023); Pittsburgh Pirates (2025); San Diego Padres (2026)

Nicholas Blake Solak (born January 11, 1995) is an American professional baseball second baseman and outfielder who is a free agent. He previously played for the Texas Rangers, Atlanta Braves, Detroit Tigers, Pittsburgh Pirates, and San Diego Padres.

The New York Yankees selected Solak in the second round of the 2016 MLB draft. After playing in several minor-league teams in the Yankees' farm system, Solak was traded to the Tampa Bay Rays in 2018 in a three-team trade, during which he played for the Double-A Montgomery Biscuits and, in 2019, the Triple-A Durham Bulls. On July 13, 2019, the Texas Rangers acquired Solak, and he was assigned to the Triple-A Nashville Sounds.

Solak made his major-league debut for the Rangers on August 20, 2019, and was voted the team's Rookie of the Year that season. Solak remained with the team until July 23, 2021, when he was sent down to the Triple-A Round Rock Express. He returned to the Rangers on August 20, 2021, and stayed with the team until May 19, 2022, when he was once again optioned to Round Rock.

== Early and personal life ==
Solak was born on January 11, 1995, in Woodridge, Illinois. He has a sister named Alexis. His father Mark worked for Motorola for 30 years, while his mother Roseann (née Pawlak) has a background in community health and substance abuse prevention. He was named after Nick's Sports Page, a sports bar in Dolton, Illinois, where his parents had first met during an event featuring Carlton Fisk. Nick played the saxophone in elementary and junior high school band, and he resumed playing it after his father had the old saxophone refurbished.

Growing up outside of Chicago, Solak was a childhood fan of the Chicago White Sox, and his favorite childhood baseball players were Scott Podsednik, Paul Konerko, and Mark Buehrle. Solak played three seasons with the baseball team at Naperville North High School in Naperville, Illinois, where he played as a middle infielder. He batted .442 with 27 runs batted in (RBI) as a junior in 2012. As a senior in 2013, he had a .340 batting average. However, only the Pittsburgh Pirates sent him a questionnaire before the 2013 Major League Baseball draft.

Solak married his girlfriend, Roxanne McVey, on November 20, 2021. Solak and McVey met during their attendance at the University of Louisville, where McVey played volleyball, with Solak proposing to her in 2019 at the bar where they first met. Their daughter was born in December 2023.

Solak and Roxanne apeared in the Bar Rescue episode "Ace's Wild" where they did recon on Ace's Sports Hangar.

== College career ==
Solak made his college baseball debut on February 16, 2014, pinch hitting for the Louisville Cardinals in their 6–1 win against the Delaware Fightin' Blue Hens. The following week, Solak experienced a number of collegiate firsts. On February 19, during the Cardinals' season home opener against Eastern Kentucky, he recorded his first RBI on a groundout. Two days later, he recorded his first hit in the Cardinals' 21–8 rout of the Western Michigan Broncos, and he made his first start the day after that as a designated hitter when the Cardinals shut out the Broncos 8–0. In the summer of 2014, he played for the Vermont Mountaineers of the New England Collegiate Baseball League.

As a sophomore in 2015, Solak attained a .324 batting average, and had three homeruns, forty RBIs, fifteen doubles, and eighteen stolen bases. Along with Pete Alonso, he played for the Bourne Braves of the Cape Cod League, with Solak name a league all-star.

In 2016, he played as a second baseman, and despite suffering from an injury, he was named a Second Team Academic All-American by the College Sports Information Directors of America, and earned second-team All-America recognition from the National Collegiate Baseball Writers Association. He had a slash line of a .376 batting average, .470 on-base percentage, and a .564 slugging percentage. He also hit four home runs, and 26 RBIs in his 42 games played in 2016. Solak finished his collegiate career with a slash line of .346/.442/.484 with 10 home runs, 94 RBI, 36 stolen bases, and a .926 on-base plus slugging (OPS).

== Professional career ==
=== New York Yankees ===
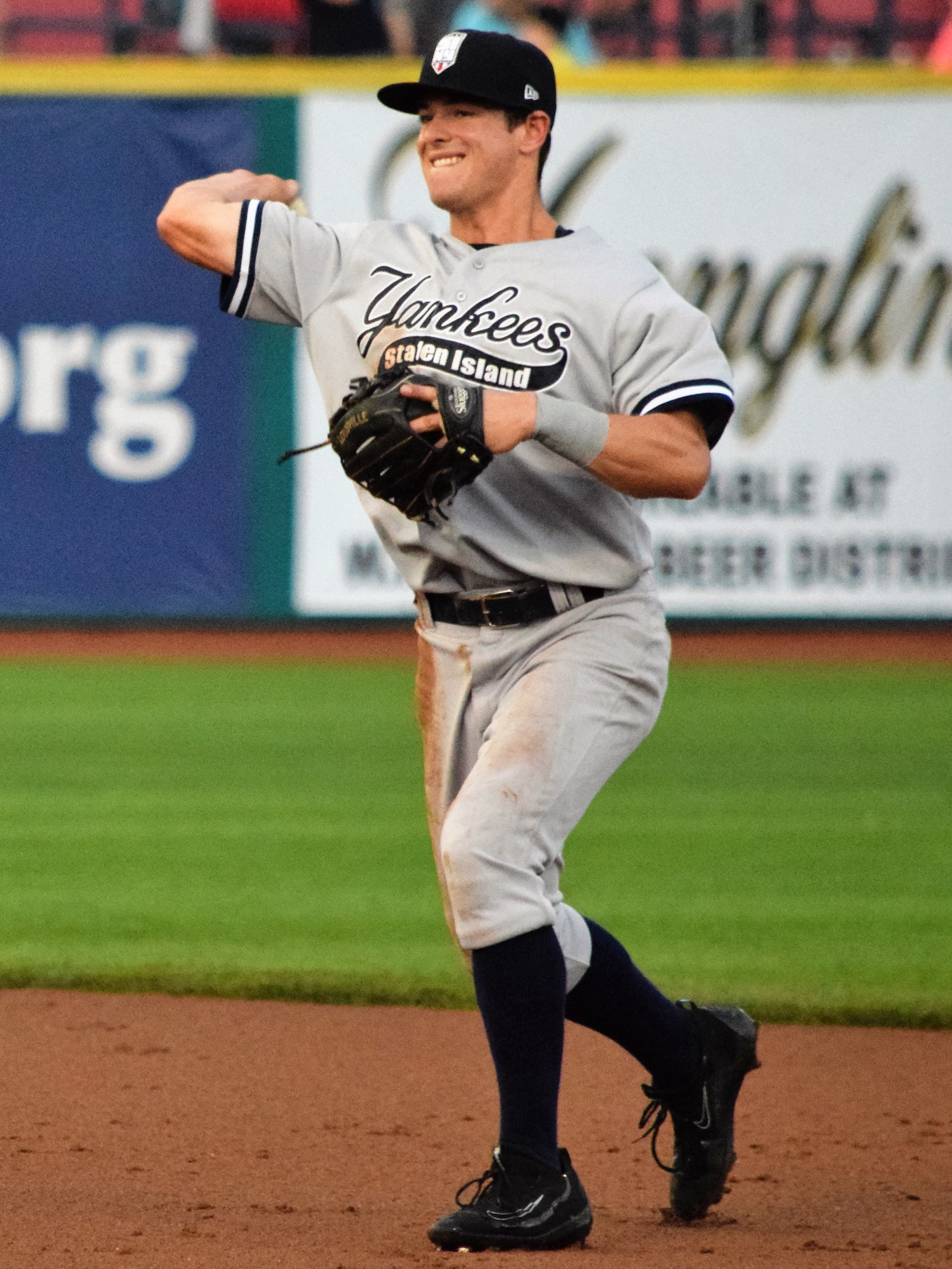
Solak with the Staten Island Yankees in 2016

The New York Yankees selected Solak in the second round of the 2016 MLB draft as the 62nd overall pick, and signed him for a $950,000 signing bonus. Before the draft, Baseball America had ranked him as the 86th-best draft prospect. He made his professional debut with the Low-A Staten Island Yankees and hit two three-run home runs during his first game there. He finished the 2016 season with a .321 batting average and three home runs, with his 77 hits a tie for the second-most hits in the New York–Penn League (NYPL), and 48 runs a tie for the third-most runs. He also hit .411 during a 14-game hitting streak stretching from July 28 to August 13. He was named to the NYPL's mid-season all-star team, and Baseball America's Short-Season All-Star team. Following the season Baseball America also ranked Solak the number 19 prospect in the Yankees organization.

In 2017, Solak finished with a .301 batting average for the High-A Tampa Yankees, hitting 10 home runs with 44 RBI and 13 stolen bases. After playing 100 games with Tampa, Solak was promoted to the then-Double-A Trenton Thunder on August 1, where he finished the season batting .286/.344/.429. He led the Florida State League (FSL) with a .397 OBP, and ranked second with a .301 average and a .460 slugging percentage. MLB.com named him to the League's postseason all-star team and the Yankees Organizational All-Star Team, and ranked him as the number five second-base prospect following the season. Moreover, Baseball America ranked Solak as the number 14 prospect in the FSL, and in their Best Tools survey, Solak was tabbed as the Best Hitter for Average in the Yankees organization.

=== Tampa Bay Rays ===
On February 18, 2018, the Yankees sent Solak to the Tampa Bay Rays in a three-team trade, in which the Yankees acquired Brandon Drury from the Arizona Diamondbacks, the Diamondbacks acquired Steven Souza from the Rays and Taylor Widener from the Yankees, and the Rays acquired Anthony Banda, Colin Poche, and Sam McWilliams from the Diamondbacks. He spent the 2018 season with the Double-A Montgomery Biscuits. After batting .282 with 19 home runs, 76 RBIs, and 21 stolen bases in 126 games, Solak was named Montgomery's MVP. Solak also participated in the Southern League All-Star Game in June.

Solak began 2019 with the Triple-A Durham Bulls of the International League, with Joe McCarthy stating that "[t]he guy is a hitter" in reference to Solak. He finished his Bulls season with a .266/.350/.485/.835 slash line, 17 home runs, and 47 RBI in 301 at-bats.

=== Texas Rangers ===
On July 13, 2019, Solak was traded to the Texas Rangers in exchange for pitcher Pete Fairbanks. He was assigned to the Nashville Sounds of the Triple-A Pacific Coast League. On August 20, the Rangers selected Solak's contract and promoted him to the major leagues. He made his major league debut that day in a double-header versus the Los Angeles Angels, recording his first career hit off Andrew Heaney and first career home run off Jaime Barría. Solak finished the 2019 season hitting .293/.393/.491 with 5 home runs and 17 RBI over 33 games for Texas. He had the fastest sprint speed of all major league designated hitters, at 28.7 feet/second, and was also voted the team's Rookie of the Year.

Entering the 2020 season, Baseball America ranked Solak as the Rangers' fourth-best prospect. Solak was the Rangers' Opening Day left fielder. In addition to left field, Solak also played at second base, center field, and as a designated hitter. His first home run of the season on August 9 was annulled after a referee changed it to an error committed by Jo Adell. Solak played 58 games (a tie for the club lead with Isiah Kiner-Falefa), finishing .268/.326/.344 and hitting two home runs.

Solak was part of the Rangers' Opening Day roster for 2021 as a second baseman. On July 23, 2021, Solak was optioned to the Triple-A Round Rock Express. Up until that point, he had a team-high 88 second-base starts, as well as a .225 batting average and 34 RBIs in 92 games. He was recalled to the Rangers on August 20. Upon his return, Solak stated he learned "not to put too much pressure on [himself] whether things are going really good or things are going really bad" while Chris Woodward, the Rangers manager, stated that "it's been nice to see him kind of make that adjustment". Solak finished the season hitting .242/.314/.362/.677 with 11 home runs and 49 RBI. From April 14 to July 9, Solak had a 71-game no-error streak, the longest single-game streak among Ranger second basemen.

Solak was part of the Rangers' 2022 Opening Day roster as an outfielder. On May 19, he was again optioned to Round Rock Express. He hit .209/.293/.313 and two home runs in his 75 plate appearances before his demotion.

=== Seattle Mariners ===
On November 10, 2022, Solak was traded to the Cincinnati Reds for cash considerations. Solak was optioned to the Triple-A Louisville Bats to begin the 2023 season. On March 30, 2023, the Reds designated him for assignment.

On March 31, 2023, the Reds traded Solak to the Seattle Mariners for cash considerations. He was optioned to the Triple-A Tacoma Rainiers. He went 1-for-13 in 4 games with Tacoma before being designated for assignment on April 10.

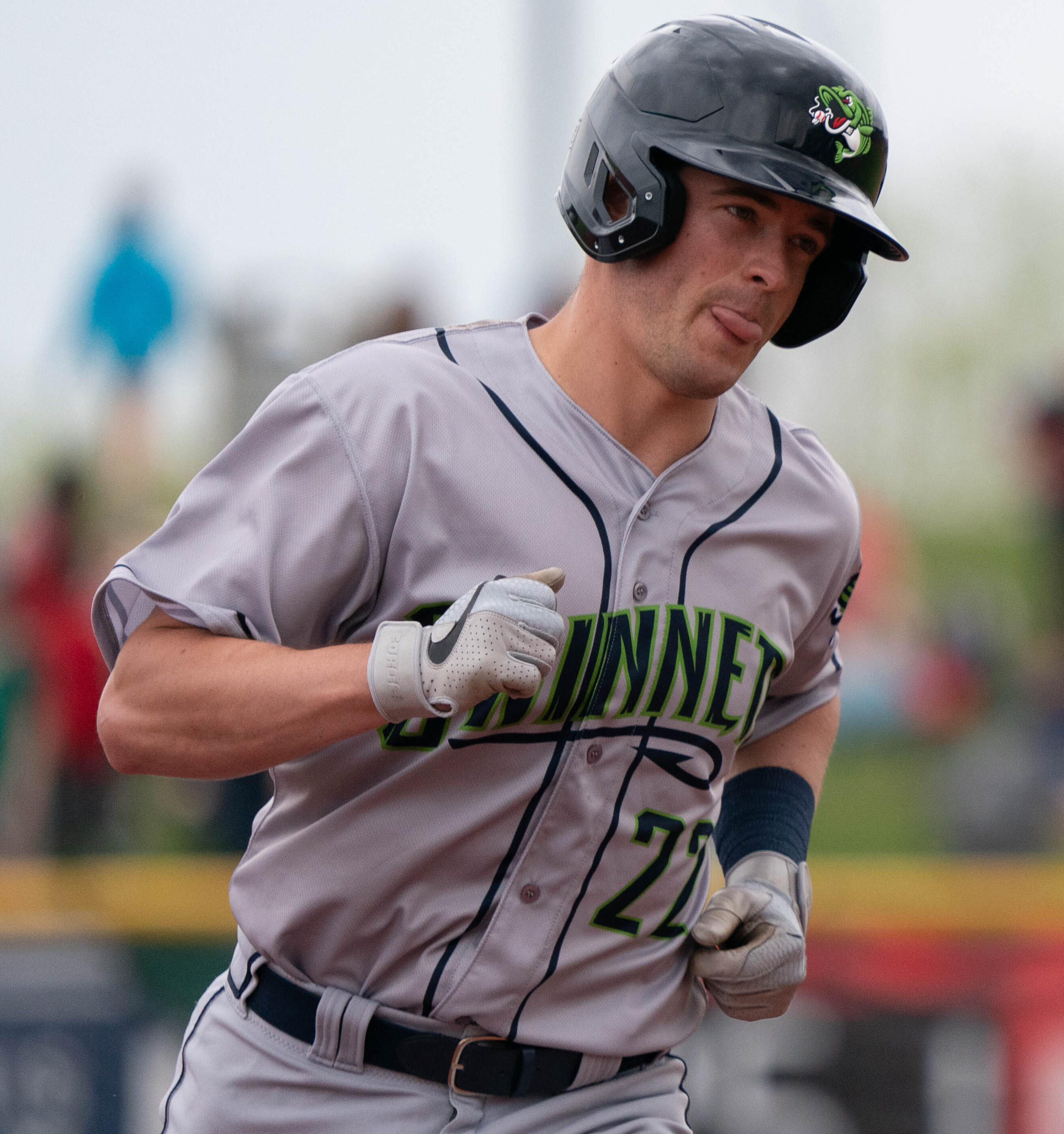
Solak rounding the bases with the Stripers

=== Atlanta Braves ===
On April 14, 2023, the Chicago White Sox claimed Solak off of waivers and optioned him to the Triple-A Charlotte Knights. He was designated for assignment on April 16.

On April 18, 2023, Solak was claimed off waivers by the Atlanta Braves and optioned to the Triple-A Gwinnett Stripers. He was recalled to the major league roster on April 25 after Eli White was placed on the paternity list. He appeared in one game against the Miami Marlins as a pinch runner for Sean Murphy before he was optioned to Gwinnett April 28. Solak was designated for assignment on June 6 following the acquisition of Ben Heller.

=== Detroit Tigers ===
On June 9, 2023, Solak was claimed off waivers by the Detroit Tigers and optioned to the Triple-A Toledo Mud Hens. The Tigers called up Solak the next day where he made his debut as a pinch runner. August 4, Solak was designated for assignment by the Tigers following the acquisition of Andrew Vasquez. On August 6, Solak cleared waivers and was sent outright to Triple–A. For the 2023 season, Solak had the distinction of having only two pinch runner appearances for two different teams without having an official at-bat. He elected free agency following the season on November 6.

=== Seattle Mariners (second stint) ===
On January 30, 2024, Solak signed a minor league contract with the Seattle Mariners. In 90 games for the Triple–A Tacoma Rainiers, he hit .311 with nine home runs, 53 RBI, and 10 stolen bases, his highest batting average in a full season since 2016. Solak elected free agency following the season on November 4.

=== Pittsburgh Pirates ===
On December 6, 2024, Solak signed a minor league contract with the Pittsburgh Pirates. He made 32 appearances for the Triple-A Indianapolis Indians, hitting .393/.452/.625 with six home runs, 19 RBI, and four stolen bases. On May 16, 2025, the Pirates selected Solak's contract, adding him to their active roster. In four appearances for Pittsburgh, he went 1-for-11 (.091). On June 3, Solak was removed from the 40-man roster and sent outright to Triple-A Indianapolis. He elected free agency the following day. Solak re-signed with Pittsburgh on a minor league contract on June 5. He elected free agency following the season on November 6.

=== San Diego Padres ===
On December 18, 2025, Solak signed a minor league contract with the San Diego Padres. He was assigned to the Triple-A El Paso Chihuahuas to begin the 2026 season, where he batted .333/.412/.512 with nine home runs, 40 RBI, and five stolen bases across his first 54 appearances. On June 13, 2026, the Padres selected Solak's contract, adding him to their active roster. He made four appearances for San Diego, going 1-for-7 (.143) with one RBI and one walk. Solak was designated for assignment by the Padres on June 21. He elected free agency after clearing waivers on June 25, then re-signed with the Padres on a minor league contract the following day. He elected free agency on November 2.
