= Michael Tonkin =

American baseball player (born 1989)

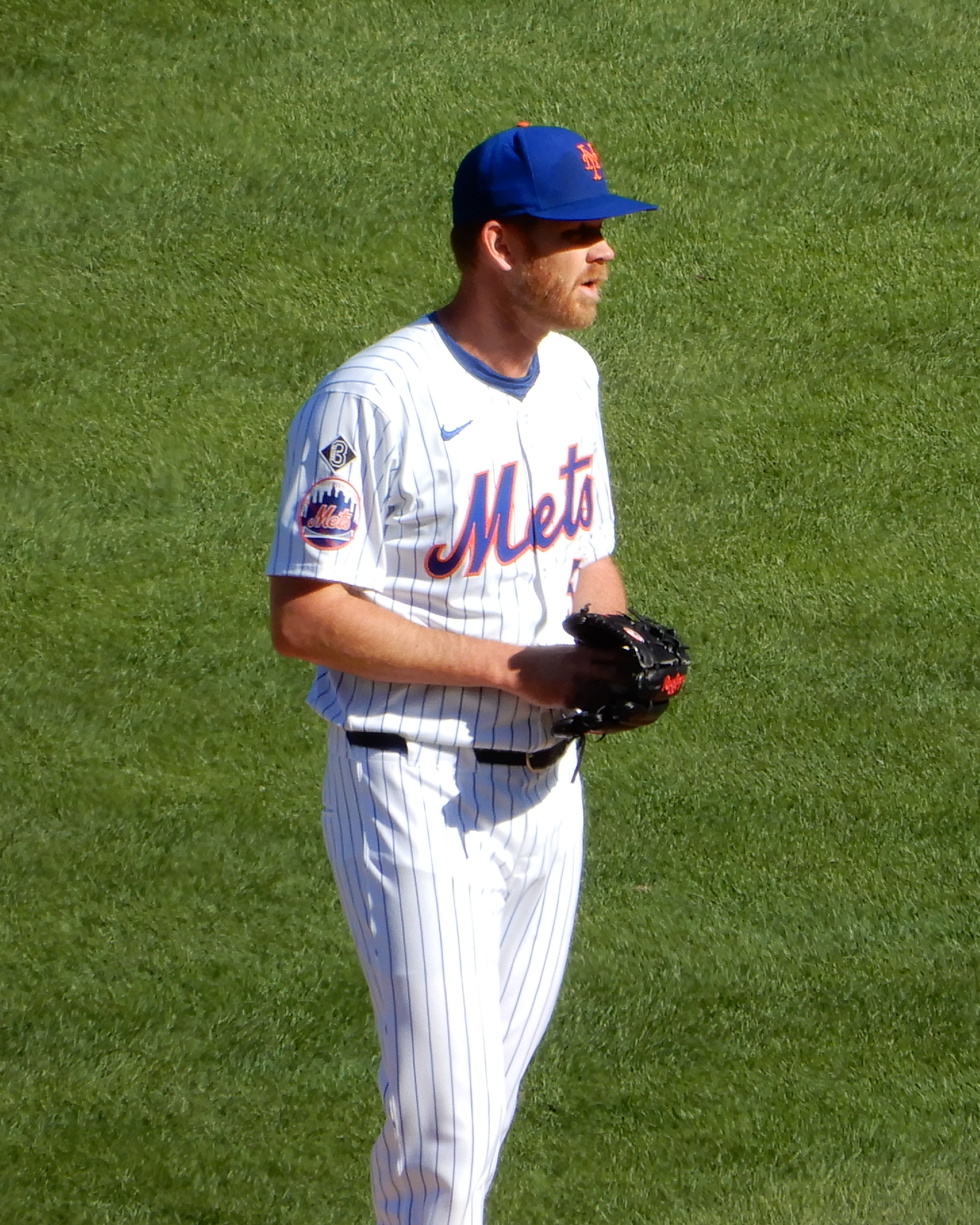
- Tonkin with the New York Mets in 2024
- Pitcher
- Born: November 19, 1989 (age 36); Glendale, California, U.S.
- Batted: Right Threw: Right

Professional debut
- MLB: July 11, 2013, for the Minnesota Twins
- NPB: April 1, 2018, for the Hokkaido Nippon-Ham Fighters

Last appearance
- MLB: September 26, 2025, for the Minnesota Twins
- NPB: October 11, 2018, for the Hokkaido Nippon-Ham Fighters

MLB statistics
- Win–loss record: 16–11
- Earned run average: 4.23
- Strikeouts: 328

NPB statistics
- Win–loss record: 4–4
- Earned run average: 3.71
- Strikeouts: 33
- Stats at Baseball Reference

Teams
- Minnesota Twins (2013–2017); Hokkaido Nippon-Ham Fighters (2018); Atlanta Braves (2023); New York Mets (2024); Minnesota Twins (2024); New York Mets (2024); New York Yankees (2024); Minnesota Twins (2024–2025)

Michael Harvey Tonkin (born November 19, 1989) is an American former professional baseball pitcher. He played in Major League Baseball (MLB) for the Minnesota Twins, Atlanta Braves, New York Mets, and New York Yankees, and in Nippon Professional Baseball (NPB) for the Hokkaido Nippon-Ham Fighters. He made his MLB debut in 2013 with the Twins.

== Career ==
=== Minnesota Twins ===
Tonkin was born in Glendale, California and attended Palmdale High School in Palmdale, California. The Minnesota Twins selected Tonkin in the 30th round, 906th overall, of the 2008 Major League Baseball draft. He made his professional debut with the rookie-level Gulf Coast League Twins, and recorded a 3.27 earned run average (ERA) in 6 games. He returned to the team the following year, posting a 3–4 record and 3.62 ERA in 11 appearances. In 2010, Tonkin split the year between the rookie-level Elizabethton Twins and the Class-A Beloit Snappers, pitching to a 4–6 record and 3.40 ERA in 23 appearances between the two teams. He returned to Beloit in 2011, and pitched to a 4–3 record and 3.87 ERA with 69 strikeouts in 76 2/3 innings of work. In 2012, Tonkin split the season between Beloit and the High-A Fort Myers Miracle, logging a cumulative 4–1 record and 2.08 ERA in 44 appearances. On November 20, 2012, the Twins added Tonkin to their 40-man roster. He was assigned to the Double-A New Britain Rock Cats to begin the 2013 season, and received a promotion to the Triple-A Rochester Red Wings later in the year.

On July 11, 2013, the Twins promoted Tonkin to the major leagues for the first time, and he made his major league debut that day, pitching 1 1/3 innings of scoreless ball against the Tampa Bay Rays. He finished his rookie season with a 0.79 ERA in 9 appearances with Minnesota. Tonkin was optioned to the Triple-A Rochester Red Wings on March 24, 2014, but recalled by the Twins on March 31 before the Rochester season began. He was optioned back to Rochester on April 3, and recalled on April 12. He was returned to Rochester again on May 9. Tonkin finished the 2014 season with a 4.74 ERA in 24 big league games with the Twins. In 2015 with Minnesota, Tonkin pitched to a 3.47 ERA with 19 strikeouts in 23 1/3 innings pitched. In 2016, for the Twins, he was 3–2 with a 5.02 ERA in 65 appearances out of the bullpen. On May 6, 2017, Tonkin was designated for assignment. He was outrighted to Rochester on May 13. On September 5, Tonkin was selected back to the 40-man roster. He ended the year having pitched in 16 games for the Twins, posting a 5.14 ERA with 24 strikeouts in 21 innings.

=== Hokkaido Nippon-Ham Fighters ===
On November 9, 2017, Tonkin's contract was sold to the Hokkaido Nippon-Ham Fighters of Nippon Professional Baseball (NPB). In 2018, Tonkin pitched in 53 games for the Fighters, recording a 4–4 record and 3.71 ERA with 33 strikeouts in 51 innings of work. He became a free agent after the season.

=== Texas Rangers ===
On January 8, 2019, Tonkin signed a minor league deal with the Texas Rangers organization. He was released by Texas on March 21.

=== Milwaukee Brewers ===
On March 22, 2019, Tonkin signed a minor league contract with the Milwaukee Brewers organization. Tonkin registered a 3–0 record and 4.26 ERA in 14 games with the Triple-A San Antonio Missions before he was released by the team on June 10.

=== Long Island Ducks ===
On June 18, 2019, Tonkin signed with the Long Island Ducks of the independent Atlantic League of Professional Baseball. In 21 games with Long Island, Tonkin pitched to a 3–2 record and 0.34 ERA with 31 strikeouts in 26 2/3 innings pitched.

=== Arizona Diamondbacks ===
On August 18, 2019, Tonkin's contract was purchased by the Arizona Diamondbacks organization and he was assigned to the Triple-A Reno Aces. Tonkin finished the year with Reno, logging a 7.71 ERA in 5 games. He did not play in a game in 2020 due to the cancellation of the minor league season because of the COVID-19 pandemic. On May 22, 2020, Tonkin was released by Arizona.

=== Long Island Ducks (second stint) ===
On March 31, 2021, Tonkin again signed with the Long Island Ducks of the Atlantic League of Professional Baseball. As a closer, Tonkin earned 9 saves and posted a league-leading 0.53 ERA over 17 innings pitched.

=== Toros de Tijuana ===
On July 13, 2021, Tonkin's contract was purchased by the Toros de Tijuana of the Mexican League.

=== Atlanta Braves ===
On January 11, 2022, Tonkin signed a minor league contract with the Atlanta Braves. He made 47 relief appearances for the Triple–A Gwinnett Stripers, logging a 3.17 ERA with 73 strikeouts and 16 saves in 48 1/3 innings pitched. On November 10, Tonkin's contract was selected to the 40-man roster.

Pitching in relief of Kyle Wright on April 11, 2023, Tonkin earned his first major league victory since 2016. On June 15, Tonkin threw 3 1/3 innings in relief of AJ Smith-Shawver, earning his first career save. He was non-tendered and became a free agent on November 17.

=== New York Mets ===
On December 6, 2023, Tonkin signed a one-year, $1 million contract with the New York Mets. In three games for the Mets, he posted an 0–2 record and 4.50 ERA with 3 strikeouts in 4 innings pitched. On April 5, 2024, Tonkin was designated for assignment.

=== Minnesota Twins (second stint) ===
On April 9, 2024, the Mets traded Tonkin to the Minnesota Twins in exchange for cash considerations. After one appearance for Minnesota, in which he gave up two runs in two innings, Tonkin was designated for assignment on April 13.

=== New York Mets (second stint) ===
On April 17, 2024, Tonkin returned to the New York Mets after being claimed off waivers from the Twins. He made two appearances for New York, allowing two runs in three innings pitched, before he was designated for assignment again on April 22.

=== New York Yankees ===
On April 25, 2024, the New York Yankees claimed Tonkin off of waivers. He earned his second career save on June 10. In 39 relief outings for the Yankees, he compiled a 3.38 ERA with 57 strikeouts and two saves over 56 innings pitched. Tonkin was designated for assignment by the Yankees on August 25.

=== Minnesota Twins (third stint) ===
On August 27, 2024, the Minnesota Twins claimed Tonkin off waivers from the Yankees. In 13 total appearances for Minnesota on the year, he recorded a 3.86 ERA with 22 strikeouts across 16 1/3 innings pitched.

Tonkin began the 2025 season on the 60-day injured list due to a mild rotator cuff strain. On June 13, 2025, Tonkin was activated from the injured list; however, he was subsequently removed from the 40-man roster and sent outright to the Triple-A St. Paul Saints. On July 28, the Twins added Tonkin to their active roster. In 21 appearances for Minnesota, he posted a 2-1 record and 4.88 ERA with 19 strikeouts over 24 innings of work. On November 6, Tonkin was removed from the 40-man roster and sent outright to St. Paul; he subsequently rejected the assignment and elected free agency.

== Personal life ==
Tonkin married Becky Feeney at the end of the 2015 season. The couple's first daughter was born in 2019. Tonkin's brother-in-law is Jason Kubel.
