= Darius Vines =

American baseball player (born 1998)

Free agent
- Pitcher
- Born: April 30, 1998 (age 28); Oxnard, California, U.S.
- Bats: Right Throws: Right

MLB debut
- August 30, 2023, for the Atlanta Braves

MLB statistics (through 2024 season)
- Win–loss record: 1–1
- Earned run average: 5.82
- Strikeouts: 23
- Stats at Baseball Reference

Teams
- Atlanta Braves (2023–2024)

Darius Marque Vines (born April 30, 1998) is an American professional baseball pitcher who is a free agent. He has previously played in Major League Baseball (MLB) for the Atlanta Braves.

== Amateur career ==
Vines attended St. Bonaventure High School in Ventura, California. He was the Ventura County Star Player of the Year his senior year in 2016. He was drafted by the Houston Astros in the 32nd round of the 2016 Major League Baseball draft, but did not sign and played college baseball at Oxnard College. He was then drafted by the Chicago Cubs in the 27th round of the 2017 MLB draft but again did not sign and transferred to Yavapai College. In 2019 Vines transferred to California State University, Bakersfield. After one year at Bakersfield, he was drafted by the Atlanta Braves in the seventh round of the 2019 MLB draft and signed.

== Professional career ==
=== Atlanta Braves ===
Vines spent his first professional season with the rookie–level Gulf Coast League Braves and rookie–level Danville Braves. In 12 games (11 starts), he struggled to an 0–5 record and 6.68 ERA with 35 strikeouts in 32 1/3 innings of work. Vines did not play in a game in 2020 due to the cancellation of the minor league season because of the COVID-19 pandemic. He returned to action in 2021, splitting the year between the Single–A Augusta GreenJackets and High–A Rome Braves. In 22 starts between the two affiliates, Vines pitched to a 6–4 record and 2.92 ERA with 129 strikeouts across 111 innings pitched.

Vines began the 2022 season with the Double–A Mississippi Braves before receiving a promotion to the Triple–A Gwinnett Stripers later in the year. In 27 combined games (25 starts), he registered an 8–4 record and 3.77 ERA with 156 strikeouts in 140 2/3 innings of work. On November 15, 2022, the Braves added Vines to their 40-man roster to protect him from the Rule 5 draft.

Vines was optioned to the Triple-A Gwinnett Stripers to begin the 2023 season. On August 28, 2023, Vines was promoted to the major leagues for the first time. He faced the Colorado Rockies two days later, pitching six innings, yielding two earned runs, and recording the win in his debut. At the end of the 2023 regular season, Vines pitched for the Salt River Rafters of the Arizona Fall League.

Vines was optioned to Triple–A Gwinnett to begin the 2024 season. On April 12, Vines was called up to the Braves' roster to replace Allan Winans. Following two starts for the Braves, Vines was optioned to Triple–A on April 22. On July 29, Vines was designated for assignment by the Braves. He cleared waivers and was sent outright to Double–A Mississippi on August 2.

Vines did not make a professional appearance for the Braves organization during the 2025 season. On November 8, 2025, Vines re-signed with the Braves on a minor league contract. He was released by Atlanta prior to the start of the regular season on March 26, 2026.

=== Tigres de Quintana Roo ===
On April 30, 2026, Vines signed with the Tigres de Quintana Roo of the Mexican League. Vines made 15 starts for Quintan Roo, compiling a 4–2 record and 3.32 ERA with 69 strikeouts over 76 innings pitched.

=== Cincinnati Reds ===
On August 4, 2026, Vines was traded to the Acereros de Monclova of the Mexican League. However, he did not appear in a game for Monclova. On August 19, Vines signed a minor league contract with the Cincinnati Reds. In 6 games (1 start) with Triple-A Louisville Bats he threw 15 innings going 1-0 with a 6.60 ERA and 10 strikeouts. He elected free agency on November 2.
