= Eli White =

American baseball player (born 1994)

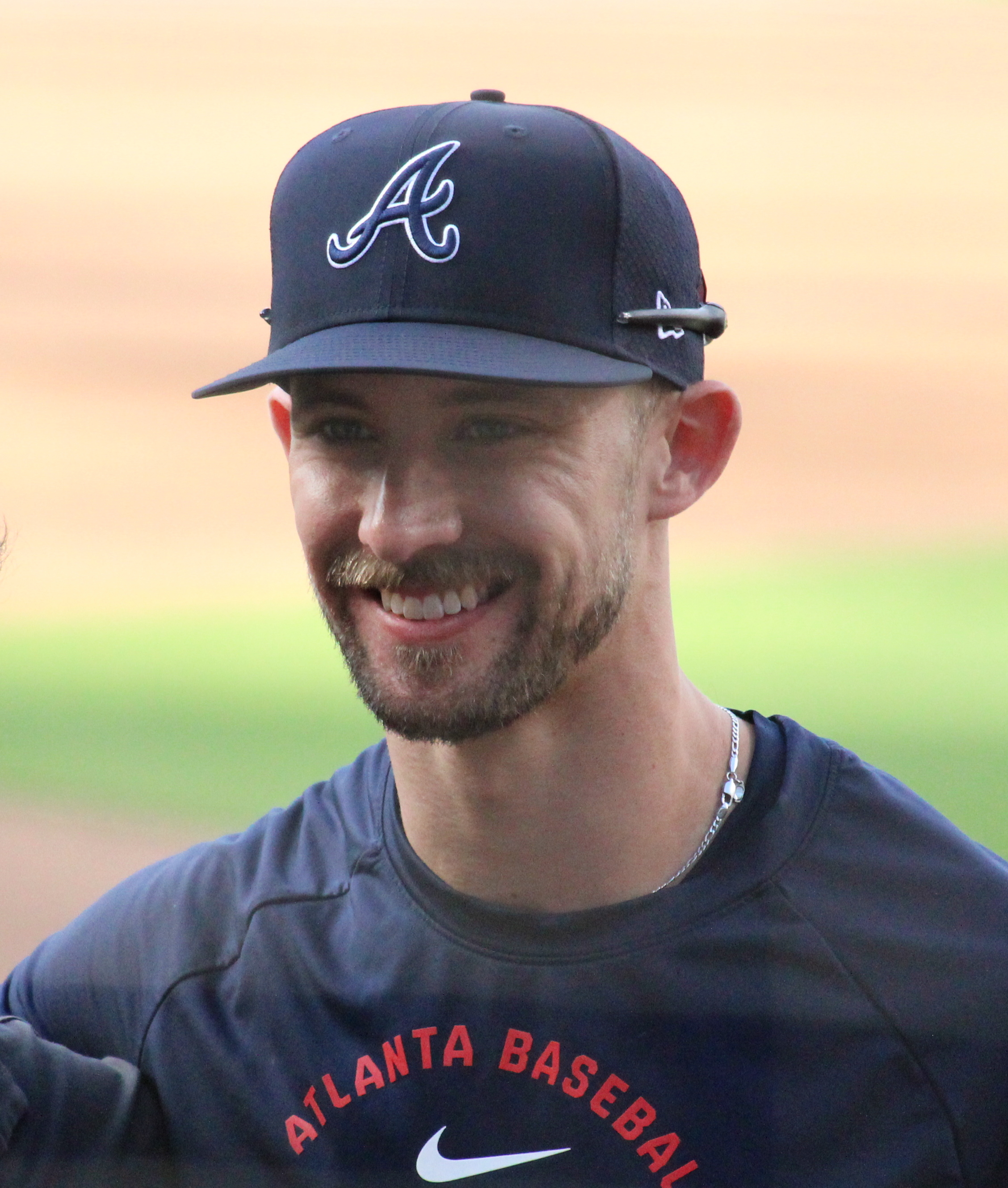
- White with the Atlanta Braves in 2026

Boston Red Sox – No. 38
- Outfielder
- Born: June 26, 1994 (age 32); Greenville, South Carolina, U.S.
- Bats: Right Throws: Right

MLB debut
- September 1, 2020, for the Texas Rangers

MLB statistics (through 2026 season)
- Batting average: .216
- Home runs: 26
- Runs batted in: 96
- Stats at Baseball Reference

Teams
- Texas Rangers (2020–2022); Atlanta Braves (2023–2026); Boston Red Sox (2026–present)

Elijah Thomas White (born June 26, 1994) is an American professional baseball outfielder for the Boston Red Sox of Major League Baseball (MLB). He has previously played in MLB for the Texas Rangers and Atlanta Braves. He made his MLB debut in 2020.

== Amateur career ==
White attended Wren High School in Piedmont, South Carolina. He was drafted by the Cincinnati Reds in the 26th round of the 2013 MLB draft but did not sign. He attended Clemson University and played college baseball for the Tigers. He was drafted by the Pittsburgh Pirates in the 37th round of the 2015 MLB draft, but again did not sign and returned to Clemson. White played for the Brewster Whitecaps of the Cape Cod League during the summer of 2015. After his junior season, he was drafted by the Oakland Athletics in the 11th round of the 2016 MLB draft and signed for a $100,000 signing bonus.

== Professional career ==
=== Oakland Athletics ===
White spent his first professional season with the Arizona League Athletics and Vermont Lake Monsters, hitting .275 with two home runs and 25 RBIs in 56 games. He played for the Stockton Ports in 2017, hitting .270 with four home runs and 36 RBIs in 115 games. In 2018, he played for the Midland RockHounds, slashing .306/.388/.450 with nine home runs, 55 RBIs, and 18 stolen bases in 130 games. After the 2018 season, he played in the Arizona Fall League for the Mesa Solar Sox.

=== Texas Rangers ===
On December 21, 2018, the Rangers acquired White from the Athletics as part of a three-team deal in which the Rangers also acquired Kyle Bird, Brock Burke, Yoel Espinal, and $750,000 of international signing bonus pool space, the Rays acquired Emilio Pagán, Rollie Lacy, and a competitive balance pick in the 2019 MLB draft, and the Athletics acquired Jurickson Profar.

In 2019, White played for the Nashville Sounds of the Triple-A Pacific Coast League. White's season ended early on August 20, when he suffered a shoulder injury after crashing into an outfield wall. White produced a .253/.320/.418/.738 slash line with 14 home runs and 43 RBI over 116 games in 2019.

On September 1, 2020, White made his MLB debut against the Houston Astros. Over 19 games with Texas in 2020, White hit .188 with 3 RBI.

On June 16, 2021, White hit his first and second career home runs, the first one off of Houston Astros starting pitcher Zack Greinke, and the second off of Astros starter-turn reliever Cristian Javier. He spent 20 games with the Round Rock Express of the Triple-A West in 2021, hitting .343/.450/.537/.987 with 3 home runs and 11 RBIs.

In 64 games with Texas in 2021, he hit .177/.259/.308/.567 with 6 home runs and 15 RBIs. In 2021, he had the fastest sprint speed of all major league left fielders, at 30.5 feet/second. He underwent Internal Brace surgery on his right elbow on September 8, 2021. Over 47 games for Texas in 2022, White hit just .200/.274/.305/.578 with 3 home runs, 10 RBI, and 12 stolen bases. He underwent surgery in June 2022 due to suffering a right wrist fracture and missed the remainder of the season.

On December 23, 2022, White was designated for assignment.

=== Atlanta Braves ===
On December 28, 2022, White was traded to the Atlanta Braves in exchange for cash considerations. White was optioned to the Triple-A Gwinnett Stripers to begin the 2023 season. White made only 6 appearances for the Braves, going 1–for–14 (.071) with 2 walks. On July 18, 2023, White was shut down for the remainder of the season after suffering a torn labrum in his left shoulder. On July 22, he was released by the Braves following the promotion of Allan Winans. On July 25, White re–signed with the Braves on a minor league contract.

White began the 2024 season with Triple–A Gwinnett, hitting .294/.402/.462 with seven home runs, 28 RBI, and 18 stolen bases across 53 games. On July 5, 2024, the Braves selected White's contract, adding him to the major league roster.

=== Boston Red Sox ===
On August 3, 2026, the Braves traded White to the Boston Red Sox in exchange for Tyler Uberstine. He made 27 appearances for the Red Sox, batting .276/.300/.379 with one home run, 12 RBI, and one stolen base. On September 22, it was announced that White had undergone season–ending surgery to repair a Lisfranc injury.
