= Forrest Wall =

American baseball player (born 1995)

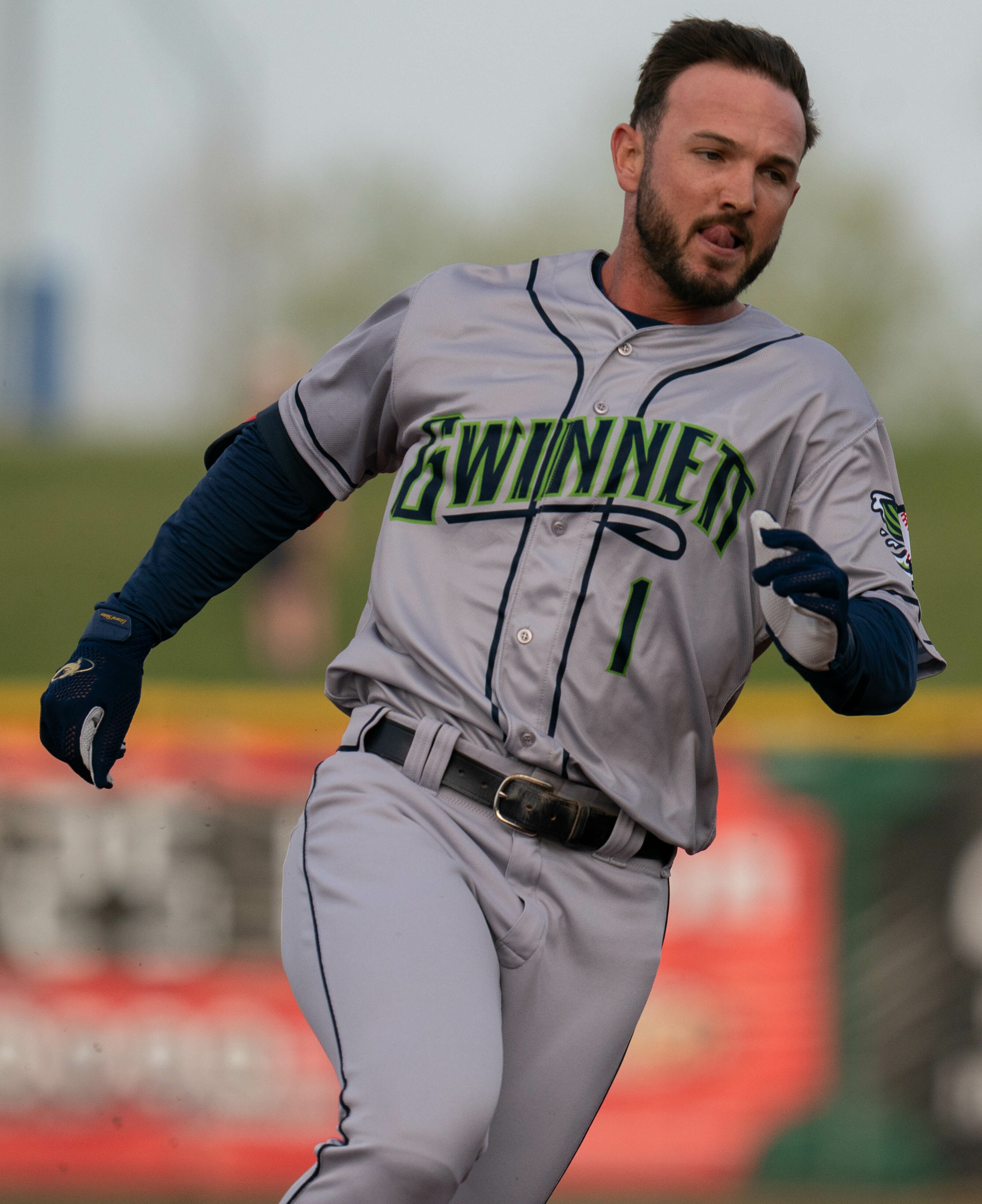
- Wall with the Gwinnett Stripers in 2023

Free agent
- Outfielder
- Born: November 20, 1995 (age 30); Winter Park, Florida, U.S.
- Bats: Left Throws: Right

MLB debut
- July 22, 2023, for the Atlanta Braves

MLB statistics (through 2024 season)
- Batting average: .311
- Home runs: 1
- Runs batted in: 3
- Stolen bases: 9
- Stats at Baseball Reference

Teams
- Atlanta Braves (2023–2024); Miami Marlins (2024)

Forrest Alexander Wall (born November 20, 1995) is an American professional baseball outfielder who is a free agent. He has previously played in Major League Baseball (MLB) for the Atlanta Braves and Miami Marlins. Wall was selected by the Colorado Rockies in the first round of the 2014 MLB draft and made his MLB debut with the Braves in 2023.

== Career ==
=== Amateur career ===
Wall attended Orangewood Christian High School in Maitland, Florida. A four-year starter on the baseball team, he batted .461 with nine home runs, 70 runs batted in (RBIs), and 70 stolen bases in 79 games played.

=== Colorado Rockies ===
The Colorado Rockies chose Wall with the 35th overall selection in the 2014 Major League Baseball draft. He signed with the Rockies and made his professional debut with the rookie–level Grand Junction Rockies, where he posted a .318 batting average with three home runs and 24 RBI, along with 18 stolen bases. In 2015, Wall played 99 games for the Single–A Asheville Tourists and four games for the Low–A Boise Hawks while on a rehab assignment. Wall ended 2015 with a .286 batting average along with seven home runs and 47 RBI.

Prior to the 2016 season, MLB.com named him the 4th best second base prospect in baseball. Wall spent 2016 with the High–A Modesto Nuts, where he posted a .264 batting average with six home runs and 56 RBI. He started 2017 with the Lancaster JetHawks where he batted .299 with three home runs, 16 RBI, and a .832 OPS in 22 games before a dislocated shoulder forced him to miss the remainder of the season. Wall began the 2018 season with Lancaster before receiving a promotion to the Double–A Hartford Yard Goats.

=== Toronto Blue Jays ===
On July 26, 2018, the Rockies traded Wall, Chad Spanberger, and either a player to be named later or cash considerations to the Toronto Blue Jays in exchange for Seung-hwan Oh. Wall finished out the season with the Double-A New Hampshire Fisher Cats, hitting .271/.354/.380 in 35 games. In 2019, Wall split the season between New Hampshire and the Triple–A Buffalo Bisons, slashing .268/.351/.422 with 11 home runs and 45 RBI in 123 games between the two teams.

Wall did not play in a game in 2020 due to the cancellation of the minor league season because of the COVID-19 pandemic. He elected free agency on November 2, 2020. On December 15, 2020, Wall re–signed with the Blue Jays on a minor league contract and was invited to spring training. In 2021, Wall spent the year with Triple–A Buffalo, posting a slash of .266/.343/.360 with one home run and 20 RBI in 78 games. He elected free agency following the season on November 7, 2021.

=== Seattle Mariners ===
On March 14, 2022, Wall signed a minor league contract with the Seattle Mariners that included an invitation to Spring Training. Wall played in 120 games for the Triple-A Tacoma Rainiers, batting .255/.333/.354 with 6 home runs, 41 RBI, and a league-leading 52 stolen bases. He elected free agency following the season on November 10.

=== Atlanta Braves ===
On January 30, 2023, Wall signed a minor league contract with the Atlanta Braves organization. In 78 games for the Triple–A Gwinnett Stripers, he hit .258/.360/.399 with 6 home runs, 38 RBI, and 45 stolen bases. On July 18, Wall was selected to the 40-man roster and promoted to the major leagues for the first time. On July 22, Wall made his major league debut against the Milwaukee Brewers as a pinch runner, stealing two bases. Against the New York Mets on August 12, Wall recorded his first career hit off Danny Mendick. In 15 games during his rookie campaign, he slashed .462/.533/.846 with one home run, two RBI, and five stolen bases.

Wall made the Braves' Opening Day roster in 2024 as a bench player. On April 19, 2024, Wall was optioned to Triple–A Gwinnett. The Braves recalled Wall on June 17. In 13 games, he batted .241/.313/.241 with one RBI and three stolen bases. Wall was designated for assignment following the promotion of Nacho Alvarez Jr. on July 22.

=== Miami Marlins ===
On July 25, 2024, Wall was claimed off waivers by the Miami Marlins. Wall went 1–for–3 with a stolen base in 3 games for Miami before he was designated for assignment on August 26.

=== Baltimore Orioles ===
On August 28, 2024, Wall was claimed off waivers by the Baltimore Orioles. He was designated for assignment by the Orioles on September 1. Wall cleared waivers and was sent outright to the Triple–A Norfolk Tides on September 3. In 14 games for Norfolk, he batted .261/.382/.370 with one home run, six RBI, and four stolen bases. Wall elected free agency following the season on November 4.

=== San Diego Padres ===
On January 16, 2025, Wall signed a minor league contract with the San Diego Padres. In 69 appearances for the Triple-A El Paso Chihuahuas, he batted .298/.384/.429 with four home runs, 39 RBI, and 21 stolen bases. On August 2, Wall opted out of his contract with San Diego and became a free agent.

=== Chicago Cubs ===
On August 7, 2025, Wall signed a minor league contract with the Chicago Cubs organization. He made 22 appearances for the Triple-A Iowa Cubs, batting .245/.367/.429 with two home runs, 13 RBI, and eight stolen bases. Wall elected free agency following the season on November 6.
