= Dylan Dodd =

American baseball player (born 1998)

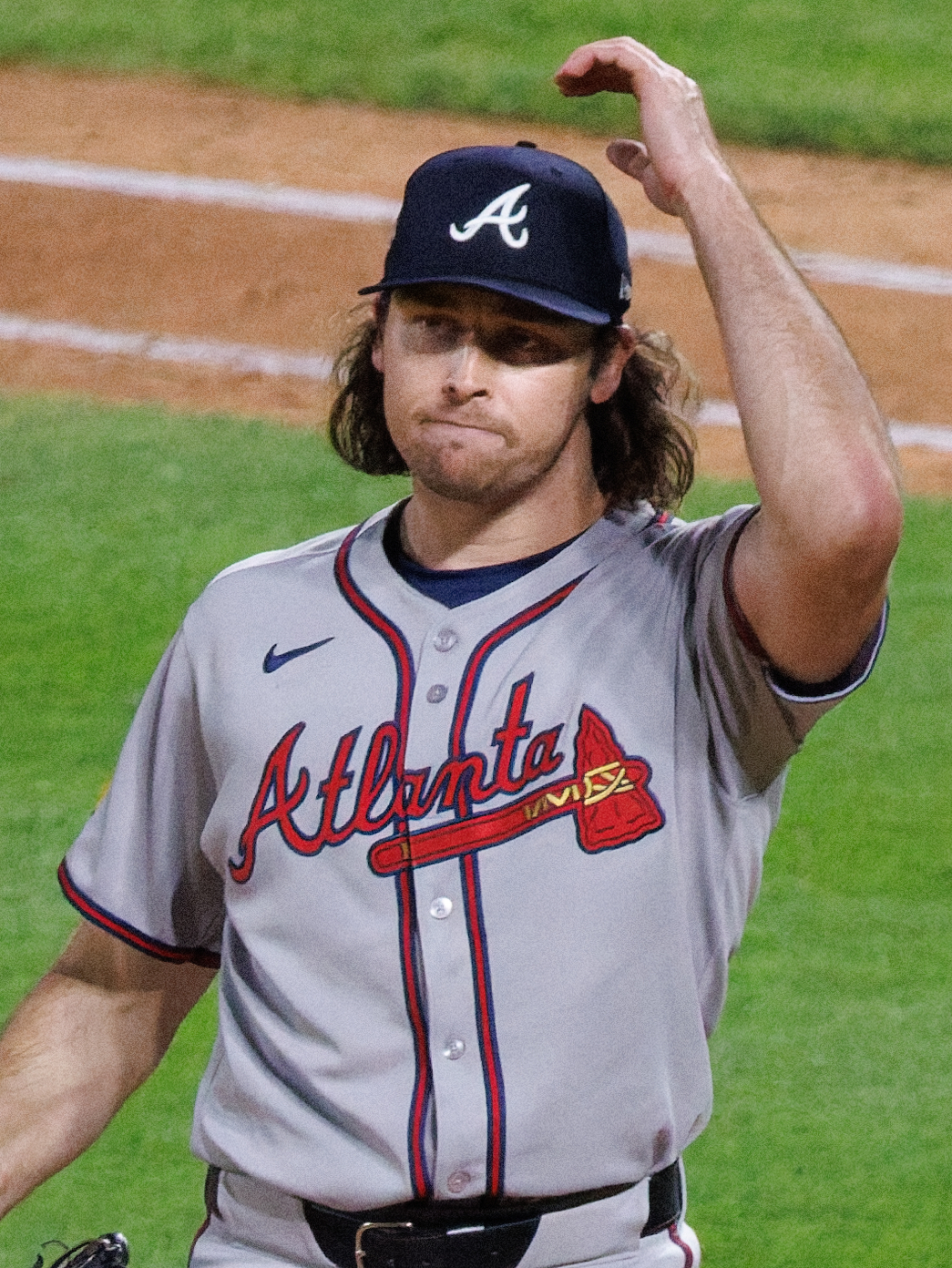
- Dodd with the Braves in 2025

Atlanta Braves – No. 46
- Pitcher
- Born: June 6, 1998 (age 28); Elk Grove, Illinois, U.S.
- Bats: Left Throws: Left

MLB debut
- April 4, 2023, for the Atlanta Braves

MLB statistics (through 2026 season)
- Win–loss record: 7–3
- Earned run average: 4.39
- Strikeouts: 100
- Stats at Baseball Reference

Teams
- Atlanta Braves (2023–present)

Dylan Martin Dodd (born June 6, 1998) is an American professional baseball pitcher for the Atlanta Braves of Major League Baseball (MLB). He made his MLB debut in 2023.

== Early life and amateur career ==
Dylan Dodd was born to parents Mark and Thea Dodd. Mark coached Dylan's high school baseball and football teams. Dodd attended Bismarck Henning High School in Bismarck, Illinois, and played college baseball at Kankakee Community College and Southeast Missouri State University. In 2021, he was named the Ohio Valley Conference Pitcher of the Year. Dodd was drafted by the Atlanta Braves in the third round of the 2021 Major League Baseball draft, and was the first athlete in his high school's history to be selected in the MLB draft. Dodd joined the Braves after agreeing to a $125,000 signing bonus.

== Professional career ==
Dodd spent his first professional season in 2021 with the Augusta GreenJackets and Rome Braves. He started 2022 with Rome before being promoted to the Mississippi Braves and ended the year with the Gwinnett Stripers.

Before the 2023 regular season began, Dodd participated in spring training and competed alongside Jared Shuster for the fifth spot in the Atlanta Braves' starting rotation. On March 26, 2023, after Kyle Wright was placed on the injured list, it was announced that both Dodd and Shuster had made the Opening Day roster and would pitch out of the rotation for the time being. On April 3, Dodd was officially selected to the 40-man roster. Dodd faced the St. Louis Cardinals in his major league debut the next day. He recorded a victory and three strikeouts while yielding one earned run on six hits in five innings. On April 9, 2023, Dodd allowed ten hits and seven earned runs, in just under five innings, in his first major league loss. Subsequently, on April 11, Dodd was optioned to the Gwinnett Stripers, as Wright was reinstated from the injured list. In 7 starts for Atlanta in his rookie campaign, he recorded a 7.60 ERA with 15 strikeouts across 34 1/3 innings of work.

Dodd was optioned to Triple–A Gwinnett to begin the 2024 season. He made only one appearance for Atlanta in 2024, allowing two runs on four hits with two strikeouts across two innings pitched. Dodd was optioned to Triple-A Gwinnett to begin the 2025 season. He would appear in 28 contests for Atlanta during the regular season, compiling a 1-0 record and 3.60 ERA with 30 strikeouts over 35 innings of work.

Dodd was again optioned to Triple-A Gwinnett to begin the 2026 season.
