= Daysbel Hernández =

Cuban baseball player (born 1996)

Free agent
- Pitcher
- Born: September 15, 1996 (age 29); Sandino, Cuba
- Bats: Right Throws: Right

MLB debut
- July 23, 2023, for the Atlanta Braves

MLB statistics (through 2025 season)
- Win–loss record: 8–3
- Earned run average: 3.38
- Strikeouts: 65
- Stats at Baseball Reference

Teams
- Atlanta Braves (2023–2025)

Daysbel Hernández (born September 15, 1996) is a Cuban professional baseball pitcher who is a free agent. He has previously played in Major League Baseball (MLB) for the Atlanta Braves.

== Career ==
Hernández signed with the Atlanta Braves as an international free agent on September 14, 2017. He made his professional debut in 2018, splitting the year between the Single–A Rome Braves and High–A Florida Fire Frogs, for whom he accumulated a 4.50 earned run average (ERA) with 36 strikeouts across 21 games.

Hernández returned to Florida in 2019, making 35 relief outings and logging a 1.71 ERA with 70 strikeouts and 7 saves. He did not play in a game in 2020 due to the cancellation of the minor league season because of the COVID-19 pandemic. Hernández returned to action in 2021 with the Double–A Mississippi Braves and Triple–A Gwinnett Stripers. He made 36 relief appearances for the two affiliates, recording a 3.83 ERA with 58 strikeouts and 3 saves across 42 1/3 innings pitched.

Hernández missed the entirety of the 2022 season, while recovering from Tommy John surgery. Hernández began the 2023 season with High–A Rome, where he made six appearances, logging a 2–0 record and 8.64 ERA before being promoted to Double–A Mississippi. Prior to his promotion, Hernández recorded a 0.00 ERA with 26 strikeouts and only four hits allowed between Mississippi and Triple–A Gwinnett.

On July 23, 2023, the Braves promoted Hernández to the major leagues for the first time, and he made his debut later that day against the Milwaukee Brewers. In his debut, Hernández pitched an inning in relief, recording three strikeouts and earning his first career win. On August 2, Hernández was placed on the 15-day injured list with right forearm inflammation. He was transferred to the 60–day injured list on September 11. He ended the regular season having pitched 3 2/3 innings across four appearances for the Braves, recording three earned runs on six hits and three walks. Hernández was activated from the injured list and added to the Braves' roster for the 2023 National League Division Series against the Philadelphia Phillies.

Hernández was optioned to Triple–A Gwinnett to begin the 2024 season. He made 16 appearances out of the bullpen for Atlanta over the course of the season, registering a 3–0 record and 2.50 ERA with 26 strikeouts over 18 innings of work.

Hernández made 39 relief appearances for the Braves during the 2025 campaign, in which he compiled a 4–3 record and 3.41 ERA with 33 strikeouts over 37 innings of work. On September 12, Hernández was placed on the injured list due to right shoulder inflammation. He was transferred to the 60-day injured list on September 21, officially ending his season.

Hernández began the 2026 season with Triple-A Gwinnett, logging a 5.06 ERA with 26 strikeouts and one save in 22 games. On July 7, 2026, Hernández was released by the Braves.
