= Allan Winans =

American baseball player (born 1995)

Free agent
- Pitcher
- Born: August 10, 1995 (age 31); Bakersfield, California, U.S.
- Bats: Right Throws: Right

Professional debut
- MLB: July 22, 2023, for the Atlanta Braves
- NPB: May 17, 2026, for the Saitama Seibu Lions

MLB statistics (through 2025 season)
- Win–loss record: 1–5
- Earned run average: 7.48
- Strikeouts: 44

NPB statistics (through 2026 season)
- Win–loss record: 2-4
- Earned run average: 5.19
- Strikeouts: 41
- Stats at Baseball Reference

Teams
- Atlanta Braves (2023–2024); New York Yankees (2025); Saitama Seibu Lions (2026)

Allan Lee Winans (born August 10, 1995) is an American professional baseball pitcher who is a free agent. He has previously played in Major League Baseball (MLB) for the Atlanta Braves and New York Yankees and in Nippon Professional Baseball (NPB) for the Saitama Seibu Lions. He made his MLB debut in 2023.

== Career ==
=== Amateur career ===
Winans graduated from Frontier High School in his hometown of Bakersfield, California in 2013, then played college baseball at Bakersfield College for the Renegades before transferring to Campbell University and playing for the Fighting Camels baseball team.

=== New York Mets ===
The New York Mets selected Winans in the 17th round, with the 500th overall selection of the 2018 Major League Baseball draft. He spent his first professional season with the rookie–level Kingsport Mets, appearing in 11 games and posting a 4.66 ERA with 15 strikeouts in 19 1/3 innings of work. He spent 2019 with the Single–A Columbia Fireflies, pitching in 30 contests and recording a 2.74 ERA with 40 strikeouts and 11 saves in 42 2/3 innings pitched.

Winans did not play in a game in 2020 due to the cancellation of the minor league season because of the COVID-19 pandemic. He returned to action in 2021 and split the season between the High–A Brooklyn Cyclones and Double–A Binghamton Rumble Ponies. In 26 total appearances out of the bullpen, Winans accumulated a 1.72 ERA with 45 strikeouts and 3 saves in 47.0 innings of work.

=== Atlanta Braves ===
On December 8, 2021, Winans was selected by the Atlanta Braves in the minor league phase of the Rule 5 draft. He dealt with injuries in 2022, and made 14 appearances for the rookie–level Florida Complex League Braves, Double–A Mississippi Braves, and Triple–A Gwinnett Stripers. In 64 1/3 innings, he went 1–5 with a 3.08 ERA and 65 strikeouts. Winans returned to Triple–A Gwinnett for the 2023 season, where he made 18 appearances (13 starts) and logged a 7–3 record and 2.81 ERA with 89 strikeouts in 102 2/3 innings pitched prior to his promotion.

On July 22, 2023, Winans was formally selected to the Braves' 40-man roster and promoted to the major leagues for the first time. He made his debut later that day against the Milwaukee Brewers. In his debut, Winans yielded two earned runs on five hits in 4^{1}/_{3} innings. After the game, he was optioned to Triple–A Gwinnett. Winans earned his first major league win on August 12, pitching seven scoreless innings in 21–3 victory against the New York Mets. He made 6 starts for Atlanta in his rookie campaign, registering a 1–2 record and 5.29 ERA with 34 strikeouts across 32 1/3 innings pitched.

Winans was optioned to Triple–A Gwinnett to begin the 2024 season. On April 7, 2024, Winans was called up to the Braves' roster to replace Spencer Strider, who had suffered a UCL injury. Following a poor performance against the Mets, Winans was optioned to Triple–A on April 11. In 2 starts for the Braves, he struggled to a 15.26 ERA with 4 strikeouts across 7 2/3 innings pitched. Winans was designated for assignment by Atlanta on January 17, 2025.

=== New York Yankees ===
On January 23, 2025, Winans was claimed off waivers by the New York Yankees. He was designated for assignment by the Yankees on February 5. Winans cleared waivers and was sent outright to the Triple-A Scranton/Wilkes-Barre RailRiders on February 7. On April 12, the Yankees selected Winans' contract, adding him to their active roster. In three appearances (one start) for the Yankees, he struggled to an 0-1 record and 8.68 ERA with six strikeouts across 9 1/3 innings pitched. On December 17, Winans was released by the Yankees in order to pursue an opportunity in Japan.

=== Saitama Seibu Lions ===
On December 18, 2025, Winans signed with the Saitama Seibu Lions of Nippon Professional Baseball. On October 13, 2026, the Lions announced that they would not bring Winans back for the 2027 season.

== Personal life ==
Before his promotion to the major leagues, Winans was a pitching instructor. To reduce physical strain, he later became a substitute teacher at Bakersfield High School, as his wife and her aunt were also educators.

== See also ==
- Rule 5 draft results
