= Kyle Wright (baseball) =

American baseball player (born 1995)

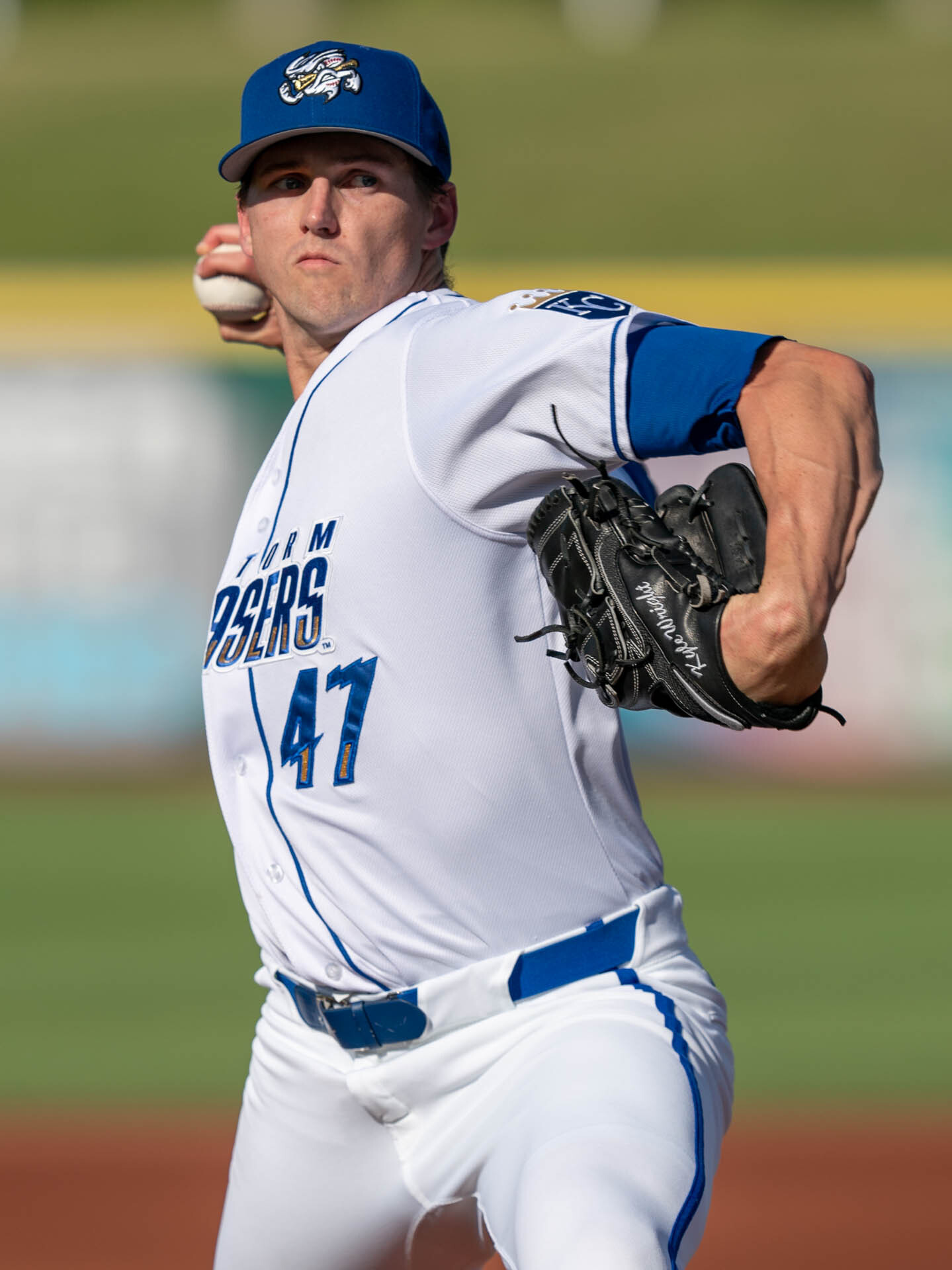
- Wright with the Omaha Storm Chasers in 2025

Free agent
- Pitcher
- Born: October 2, 1995 (age 31); Huntsville, Alabama, U.S.
- Bats: Right Throws: Right

MLB debut
- September 4, 2018, for the Atlanta Braves

MLB statistics (through 2023 season)
- Win–loss record: 24–16
- Earned run average: 4.45
- Strikeouts: 267
- Stats at Baseball Reference

Teams
- Atlanta Braves (2018–2023)

Career highlights and awards
- World Series champion (2021); MLB wins leader (2022)

Kyle Hardy Wright (born October 2, 1995) is an American professional baseball pitcher who is a free agent. He has previously played in Major League Baseball (MLB) for the Atlanta Braves. He played college baseball at Vanderbilt University. He was selected by the Braves with the fifth overall selection of the 2017 MLB draft, and made his MLB debut in 2018.

== Early life ==
Kyle was born in Huntsville, Alabama, to Roger and Belinda Wright. He has an elder brother, Mitchell, and younger brother, Trey. He grew up a fan of the Atlanta Braves.

== Amateur career ==
Wright attended Buckhorn High School in New Market, Alabama. As a junior, he went 6–2 with a 0.88 earned run average (ERA) and 75 strikeouts. He committed to Vanderbilt University to play college baseball.

As a freshman at Vanderbilt in 2015, Wright appeared in 29 games with three starts and went 6–1 with a 1.23 ERA, 62 strikeouts and four saves. Wright became a full-time starter in 2016. In 16 starts, he went 8–4 with a 3.09 ERA and 107 strikeouts. After the season, he played for the United States collegiate national team. As a junior in 2017, Wright went 5–6 with a 3.40 ERA and 121 strikeouts.

== Professional career ==
=== Atlanta Braves ===
The Atlanta Braves selected Wright with the fifth overall selection of the 2017 Major League Baseball draft. He signed for a $7 million signing bonus on June 16, and was assigned to the rookie-level Gulf Coast League Braves. Wright was promoted to the Florida Fire Frogs in August 2017, and finished the season there. In nine games started between the two teams, he was 0–1 with a 2.65 ERA.

Wright received an invitation to spring training at the start of the 2018 season. He began the season with the Mississippi Braves. Wright pitched 109 1/3 innings and recorded a 3.70 ERA alongside 105 strikeouts and 43 walks. On July 30, 2018, Wright was promoted to the Gwinnett Stripers.

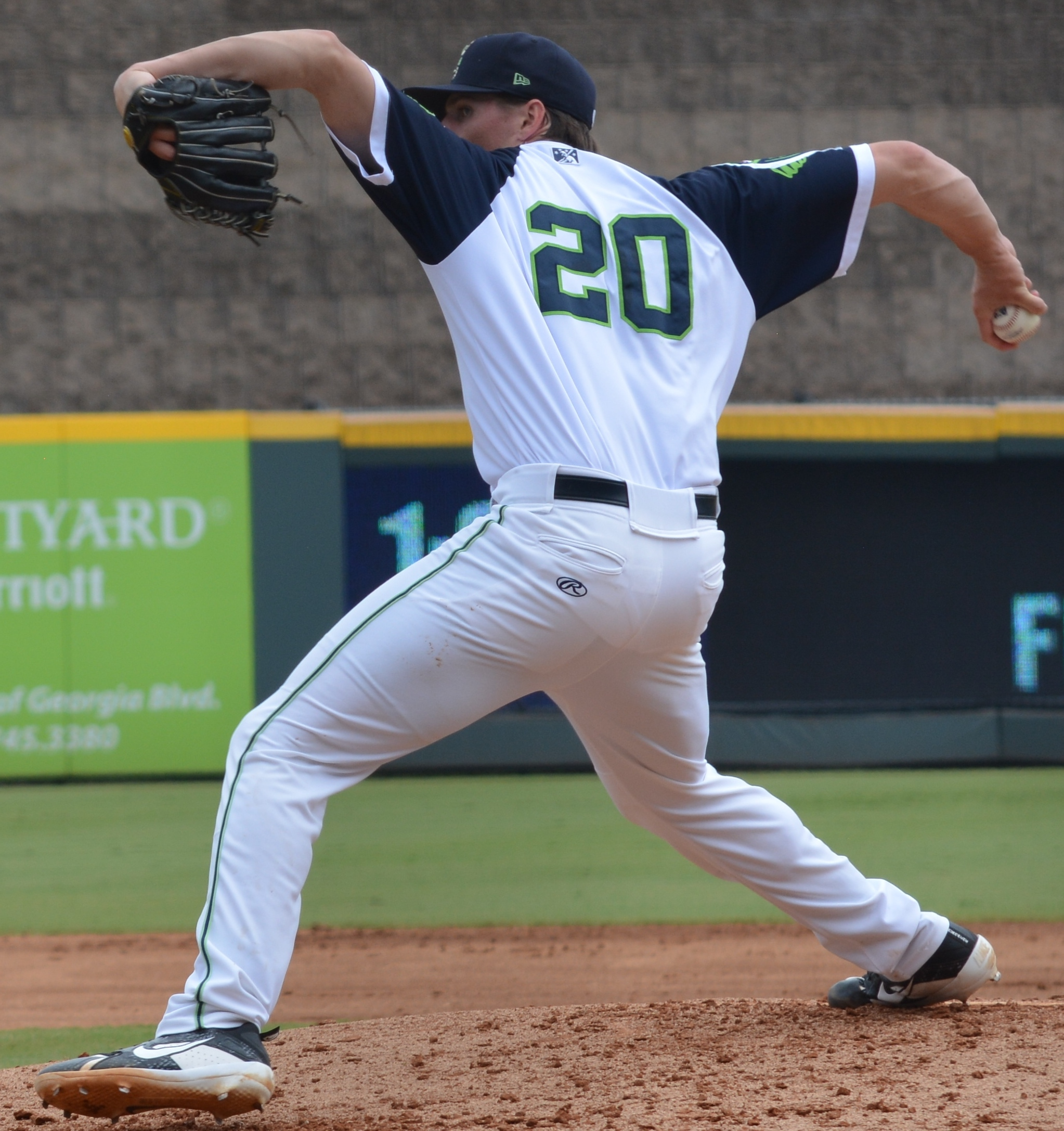
Wright with Gwinnett in 2018

Wright was called up to the major leagues for the first time on September 1, 2018. He was the first player from the 2017 draft class to make it to the majors. He made his major league debut on September 4 against the Boston Red Sox. He was 0–0 with a 4.50 ERA in six innings pitched.

Wright made the Braves' starting rotation at the start of the 2019 season. He struggled through three starts, and was optioned to Gwinnett on April 13. In the majors, he was 0–3 with an 8.69 ERA in 19 2/3 innings.

In 2020, he was 2–4 with a 5.21 ERA in 38 innings in eight starts. He was ninth in the NL, with 24 walks. He primarily threw a 94 mph sinker and an 88 mph slider, while also throwing a 95 mph four-seam fastball, 88 mph changeup, and 82 mph curveball. He made his postseason debut in October against the Miami Marlins during the National League Division Series, pitching six innings of shutout ball in the Braves' Game 3 and series-clinching victory. He lasted less than an inning in his sole National League Championship Series start, allowing seven earned runs in Game 3 to the Los Angeles Dodgers.

He spent most of the 2021 regular season with Gwinnett, with which he was 10–5 with a 3.02 ERA in 24 starts in which he pitched 137 innings. He also pitched two starts for the Braves, and was 0–1 with a 9.95 ERA in 6 1/3 innings. On October 26, 2021, it was announced that Wright was added to the Braves roster for the World Series against the Houston Astros. Wright pitched one inning in Game 2, striking out the side. Then, in Game 4, he entered the game with one out and the bases loaded in the first inning. Wright proceeded to work out of the jam with only one inherited runner scoring, then pitched four subsequent innings, allowing only one additional run. The Braves scored three runs, with successive home runs by Dansby Swanson and Jorge Soler, and won the game, 3–2. Despite only pitching 6 2/3 innings in the regular season, Wright's 5 2/3 innings pitched in the World Series was the second highest among Braves pitchers.

Wright began the 2022 season on the Braves Opening Day roster. On September 24, Wright won his 20th game of the season, and became the first Braves pitcher since Russ Ortiz in 2003 to reach that milestone. Before the season had begun, Wright had only recorded two career wins. Wright ended the regular season with 21 victories, which led all of Major League Baseball. A Braves pitcher had not led MLB in wins since Tom Glavine's 2000 season.

Wright's 2023 season was affected by injury. He made seven starts and nine total appearances for Atlanta, working to a 1–3 record 6.97 ERA with in 31 innings pitched. On May 3, 2023, he departed a start against the Miami Marlins with an apparent injury. After undergoing an MRI, it was revealed that Wright had suffered a shoulder strain. He was placed on the 60-day injured list on May 15, and estimated to miss about two months. On September 11, Wright was activated from the injured list. On October 7, 2023, Wright underwent shoulder surgery to repair right shoulder damage, which caused him to miss the entirety of the 2024 season.

=== Kansas City Royals ===
On November 17, 2023, the Braves traded Wright to the Kansas City Royals in exchange for pitcher Jackson Kowar. On December 17, 2024, Wright and the Royals agreed to a contract for the 2025 season worth $1.8 million, the same salary he made while recovering from surgery the previous season.

Wright began the 2025 season in rehabilitation with the Double-A Northwest Arkansas Naturals, and was briefly pulled off the assignment after experiencing shoulder fatigue, without starting a game. On June 23, 2025, Wright was activated off of the injured list and optioned to the Triple-A Omaha Storm Chasers. However, on June 28, Wright was scratched from his first scheduled start for Omaha due to tightness in his left oblique. On November 6, Wright was removed from the 40-man roster and sent outright to Omaha, but rejected the assignment and elected free agency.

=== Chicago Cubs ===
On February 10, 2026, Wright signed a minor league contract with the Chicago Cubs. He did not appear in a game for the organization and was released by the Cubs on July 12.
