= 2023 Miami Marlins season =

2023 Miami Marlins
- National League Wild Card
- League: National League
- Division: East
- Ballpark: LoanDepot Park
- City: Miami, Florida
- Record: 84–78 (.519)
- Divisional place: 3rd
- Owners: Bruce Sherman
- General managers: Kim Ng
- Managers: Skip Schumaker
- Television: Bally Sports Florida; Bally Sports Sun
- Radio: WINZ; Miami Marlins Radio Network (English)

The 2023 Miami Marlins season was the 31st season for the Major League Baseball (MLB) franchise in the National League and the 12th as the Miami Marlins. The Marlins played their home games at LoanDepot Park as members of the National League East. It also was the team's first season under the management of Skip Schumaker.

On May 10, the Marlins set an MLB record by winning their twelfth consecutive one-run game to start the season, jumping the 1972 New York Mets, who started 11–0 in one-run games.

With a win over the Washington Nationals on September 3, the Marlins improved on their 69–93 record from the 2022 season. Following another win against the Milwaukee Brewers on September 24, their 81st of the season, the Marlins secured their first non-losing full season since the 2009 season, when the team was still known as the Florida Marlins.

On September 30, the Marlins clinched their first playoff berth since the abbreviated 2020 season and their first in a full season since the 2003 season. They lost to their division rival Philadelphia Phillies in the National League Wild Card Series in a two-game sweep, ending their season.

The Miami Marlins drew an average home attendance of 14,355 in 81 home games in the 2023 MLB season. The total attendance was 1,162,819.

== Offseason ==
=== Rule changes ===
Pursuant to the CBA, new rule changes took place for the 2023 season:

- institution of a pitch clock between pitches; 15 seconds from when the pitcher gets the ball to when he begins his throwing motion and 18 seconds with runner(s) on base. If the pitcher waits too long an automatic ball will be added to the count. And batters must be in the batter's box engaged with the pitcher before the pitch clock reaches 8 seconds or an automatic strike will be called on him
- limits on pickoff attempts per plate appearance; a pitcher may only pickoff 3 times, if the pitcher does not succeed the 3rd time he will be called for a balk.
- limits on defensive shifts requiring two infielders to be on either side of second base and be within the boundary of the infield; and engaged with the infield dirt
- larger bases (increased to 18-inch squares);

== Season standings ==
=== National League East ===
NL East
Team	W	L	Pct.	GB	Home	Road
Atlanta Braves	104	58	.642	—	52‍–‍29	52‍–‍29
Philadelphia Phillies	90	72	.556	14	49‍–‍32	41‍–‍40
Miami Marlins	84	78	.519	20	46‍–‍35	38‍–‍43
New York Mets	75	87	.463	29	43‍–‍38	32‍–‍49
Washington Nationals	71	91	.438	33	34‍–‍47	37‍–‍44

=== National League Wild Card ===
Division leaders
Team	W	L	Pct.
Atlanta Braves	104	58	.642
Los Angeles Dodgers	100	62	.617
Milwaukee Brewers	92	70	.568

Wild Card teams (Top 3 teams qualify for postseason)
Team	W	L	Pct.	GB
Philadelphia Phillies	90	72	.556	+6
Miami Marlins	84	78	.519	—
Arizona Diamondbacks	84	78	.519	—
Chicago Cubs	83	79	.512	1
San Diego Padres	82	80	.506	2
Cincinnati Reds	82	80	.506	2
San Francisco Giants	79	83	.488	5
Pittsburgh Pirates	76	86	.469	8
New York Mets	75	87	.463	9
St. Louis Cardinals	71	91	.438	13
Washington Nationals	71	91	.438	13
Colorado Rockies	59	103	.364	25

=== Record vs. opponents ===
==== Record vs. National League ====
2023 National League record Source: MLB Standings Grid – 2023
Team	AZ	ATL	CHC	CIN	COL	LAD	MIA	MIL	NYM	PHI	PIT	SD	SF	STL	WSH	AL
Arizona	—	3–3	6–1	3–4	10–3	5–8	2–4	4–2	1–6	3–4	4–2	7–6	7–6	3–3	5–1	21–25
Atlanta	3–3	—	4–2	5–1	7–0	4–3	9–4	5–1	10–3	8–5	4–3	3–4	4–2	4–2	8–5	26–20
Chicago	1–6	2–4	—	6–7	4–2	3–4	2–4	6–7	3–3	1–5	10–3	4–3	5–1	8–5	3–4	25–21
Cincinnati	4–3	1–5	7–6	—	4–2	4–2	3–3	3–10	4–2	3–4	5–8	3–3	3–4	6–7	4–3	28–18
Colorado	3–10	0–7	2–4	2–4	—	3–10	5–2	4–2	4–2	2–5	2–4	4–9	4–9	3–3	3–4	18–28
Los Angeles	8–5	3–4	4–3	2–4	10–3	—	3–3	5–1	3–3	4–2	4–3	9–4	7–6	4–3	4–2	30–16
Miami	4–2	4–9	4–2	3–3	2–5	3–3	—	3–4	4–8	7–6	5–2	2–4	3–3	3–4	11–2	26–20
Milwaukee	2–4	1–5	7–6	10–3	2–4	1–5	4–3	—	6–1	4–2	8–5	6–1	2–5	8–5	3–3	28–18
New York	6–1	3–10	3–3	2–4	2–4	3–3	8–4	1–6	—	6–7	3–3	3–3	4–3	4–3	7–6	19–27
Philadelphia	4–3	5–8	5–1	4–3	5–2	2–4	6–7	2–4	7–6	—	3–3	5–2	2–4	5–1	7–6	28–18
Pittsburgh	2–4	3–4	3–10	8–5	4–2	3–4	2–5	5–8	3–3	3–3	—	5–1	2–4	9–4	5–2	19–27
San Diego	6–7	4–3	3–4	3–3	9–4	4–9	4–2	1–6	3–3	2–5	1–5	—	8–5	3–3	3–3	28–18
San Francisco	6–7	2–4	1–5	4–3	9–4	6–7	3–3	5–2	3–4	4–2	4–2	5–8	—	6–1	1–5	20–26
St. Louis	3–3	2–4	5–8	7–6	3–3	3–4	4–3	5–8	3–4	1–5	4–9	3–3	1–6	—	4–2	23–23
Washington	1–5	5–8	4–3	3–4	4–3	2–4	2–11	3–3	6–7	6–7	2–5	3–3	5–1	2–4	—	23–23

Updated with the results of all games through October 1, 2023.

==== Record vs. American League ====
2023 National League record vs. American League Source: MLB Standings
Team	BAL	BOS	CWS	CLE	DET	HOU	KC	LAA	MIN	NYY	OAK	SEA	TB	TEX	TOR
Arizona	1–2	1–2	2–1	2–1	3–0	0–3	2–1	2–1	0–3	1–2	2–1	1–2	1–2	3–1	0–3
Atlanta	2–1	1–3	1–2	2–1	2–1	0–3	3–0	2–1	3–0	3–0	1–2	2–1	2–1	2–1	0–3
Chicago	2–1	1–2	3–1	1–2	2–1	0–3	2–1	0–3	1–2	2–1	3–0	2–1	2–1	2–1	2–1
Cincinnati	2–1	2–1	1–2	2–2	2–1	3–0	3–0	3–0	1–2	0–3	2–1	2–1	1–2	3–0	1–2
Colorado	1–2	2–1	2–1	2–1	1–2	1–3	2–1	2–1	1–2	2–1	1–2	0–3	0–3	0–3	1–2
Los Angeles	2–1	2–1	2–1	2–1	2–1	2–1	1–2	4–0	2–1	1–2	3–0	3–0	1–2	2–1	1–2
Miami	0–3	3–0	2–1	2–1	2–1	1–2	3–0	3–0	2–1	2–1	3–0	1–2	1–3	0–3	1–2
Milwaukee	2–1	1–2	3–0	2–1	1–2	2–1	3–0	2–1	2–2	2–1	0–3	3–0	1–2	3–0	1–2
New York	0–3	1–2	2–1	3–0	0–3	1–2	0–3	1–2	1–2	2–2	3–0	2–1	2–1	1–2	0–3
Philadelphia	2–1	1–2	2–1	1–2	3–0	2–1	2–1	2–1	1–2	1–2	3–0	2–1	3–0	0–3	3–1
Pittsburgh	1–2	3–0	2–1	1–2	2–2	1–2	3–0	1–2	1–2	1–2	1–2	1–2	0–3	1–2	0–3
San Diego	2–1	1–2	3–0	2–1	2–1	1–2	1–2	3–0	1–2	1–2	3–0	1–3	2–1	3–0	2–1
San Francisco	1–2	2–1	2–1	2–1	0–3	2–1	1–2	1–2	2–1	1–2	2–2	1–2	1–2	1–2	1–2
St. Louis	2–1	3–0	2–1	1–2	1–2	1–2	2–2	0–3	1–2	2–1	2–1	1–2	2–1	1–2	2–1
Washington	0–4	2–1	2–1	1–2	2–1	1–2	2–1	1–2	2–1	2–1	3–0	2–1	0–3	2–1	1–2

Updated with the results of all games through October 1, 2023.

== Roster ==
2023 Miami Marlins
Roster
Pitchers: 22 Sandy Alcántara; 32 Matt Barnes; 25 Archie Bradley; 31 Huascar Brazobán; 27 Edward Cabrera; 20 Daniel Castano; 83 J. T. Chargois; 47 Johnny Cueto; 83 Enmanuel De Jesus; 36 Dylan Floro; 92 Robert Garcia; 29 Braxton Garrett; 17 Chi Chi Gonzalez; 41 Geoff Hartlieb; 78 Bryan Hoeing; 56 Jeff Lindgren; 52 Jorge López; 44 Jesus Luzardo; 45 Matt Moore; 43 Andrew Nardi; 59 Sean Nolin; 48 Steven Okert; 39 Eury Pérez; 35 A. J. Puk; 68 Johan Quezada; 19 David Robertson; 28 Trevor Rogers; 66 Tanner Scott; 38 Devin Smeltzer; 62 George Soriano; 60 Ryan Weathers	Catchers: 4 Nick Fortes; 58 Jacob Stallings; Infielders: 67 Jacob Amaya; 3 Luis Arráez; 9 Josh Bell; 5 Jon Berti; 36 Jake Burger; 26 Garrett Cooper; 63 Xavier Edwards; 10 Yuli Gurriel; 9 Jean Segura; 18 Joey Wendle	Outfielders: 6 Peyton Burdick; 2 Jazz Chisholm Jr.; 49 Jonathan Davis; 14 Bryan De La Cruz; 24 Avisaíl García; 1 Garrett Hampson; 54 Dane Myers; 7 Jesús Sánchez; 12 Jorge Soler	Manager: 55 Skip Schumaker; Coaches: 81 Griffin Benedict (quality assurance); 73 Brant Brown (hitting); 21 Wellington Cepeda (bullpen); 85 Rob Flippo (bullpen coordinator); 46 Jason Hart (assistant hitting); 11 Jon Jay (first base/outfield); 57 John Mabry (assistant hitting); 33 Jody Reed (third base/infield); 30 Mel Stottlemyre Jr. (pitching); 40 Luis Urueta (bench)

== Player statistics ==
= Indicates team leader

=== Batting ===
Note: G = Games played; AB = At bats; R = Runs; H = Hits; 2B = Doubles; 3B = Triples; HR = Home runs; RBI = Runs batted in; SB = Stolen bases; BB = Walks; AVG = Batting average; SLG = Slugging average

Player	G	AB	R	H	2B	3B	HR	RBI	SB	BB	AVG	SLG
Bryan De La Cruz	153	579	60	149	32	0	19	78	4	40	.257	.411
Luis Arráez	147	574	71	203	30	3	10	69	3	35	.354	.469
Jorge Soler	137	504	77	126	24	0	36	75	1	66	.250	.512
Jon Berti	133	388	53	114	16	3	7	33	16	29	.294	.405
Jesús Sánchez	125	360	43	91	23	3	14	52	3	38	.253	.450
Jazz Chisholm Jr.	97	352	50	88	12	2	19	51	22	26	.250	.457
Garrett Cooper	82	305	28	78	11	1	13	46	0	17	.256	.426
Jean Segura	85	301	25	66	5	2	3	21	6	22	.219	.279
Yuli Gurriel	108	298	32	73	16	3	4	27	4	26	.245	.359
Joey Wendle	112	297	33	63	16	3	2	20	7	13	.212	.306
Nick Fortes	108	294	33	60	10	0	6	26	4	17	.204	.299
Jacob Stallings	88	241	22	46	14	0	3	20	0	27	.191	.286
Garrett Hampson	98	221	30	61	12	1	3	23	5	23	.276	.380
Josh Bell	53	200	26	54	9	0	11	26	0	20	.270	.480
Jake Burger	53	198	27	60	13	0	9	28	0	10	.303	.505
Avisaíl García	37	108	8	20	3	1	3	12	2	6	.185	.315
Jonathan Davis	34	90	22	22	4	1	2	10	1	7	.244	.378
Xavier Edwards	30	78	12	23	3	0	0	3	5	3	.295	.333
Dane Myers	22	67	9	18	3	0	1	9	1	2	.269	.358
Peyton Burdick	14	33	4	6	2	0	1	2	1	3	.182	.333
Jacob Amaya	4	9	1	2	0	0	0	2	1	0	.222	.222
Totals	162	5497	666	1423	258	23	166	633	86	430	.259	.405
Rank in NL	—	8	15	2	12	8	10	15	13	14	2	10

Source:Baseball Reference

=== Pitching ===
Note: W = Wins; L = Losses; ERA = Earned run average; G = Games pitched; GS = Games started; SV = Saves; IP = Innings pitched; H = Hits allowed; R = Runs allowed; ER = Earned runs allowed; BB = Walks allowed; SO = Strikeouts

Player	W	L	ERA	G	GS	SV	IP	H	R	ER	BB	SO
Sandy Alcántara	7	12	4.14	28	28	0	184.2	176	91	85	48	151
Jesús Luzardo	10	10	3.58	32	32	0	178.2	162	79	71	55	208
Braxton Garrett	9	7	3.66	31	30	0	159.2	154	68	65	29	156
Edward Cabrera	7	7	4.24	22	20	0	99.2	78	48	47	66	118
Eury Pérez	5	6	3.15	19	19	0	91.1	72	35	32	31	108
Tanner Scott	9	5	2.31	74	0	12	78.0	53	22	20	24	104
Bryan Hoeing	2	3	5.48	33	7	0	70.2	71	45	43	25	53
Huascar Brazobán	5	2	4.14	50	0	0	58.2	53	28	27	31	65
Steven Okert	3	2	4.45	64	2	0	58.2	50	31	29	24	73
Andrew Nardi	8	1	2.67	63	0	3	57.1	45	18	17	21	73
A. J. Puk	7	5	3.97	58	0	15	56.2	54	29	25	13	78
Johnny Cueto	1	4	6.02	13	10	0	52.1	51	36	35	15	39
George Soriano	0	0	3.81	26	1	1	52.0	46	26	22	23	52
J. T. Chargois	1	0	3.61	46	5	1	42.1	35	17	17	18	35
Dylan Floro	3	5	4.54	43	0	7	39.2	48	24	20	11	41
Devin Smeltzer	0	1	6.45	9	1	0	22.1	29	18	16	4	16
Matt Barnes	1	0	5.48	24	1	0	21.1	25	13	13	10	20
David Robertson	2	4	5.06	22	0	4	21.1	22	15	12	12	30
Trevor Rogers	1	2	4.00	4	4	0	18.0	16	9	8	6	19
Ryan Weathers	0	2	7.62	3	2	0	13.0	13	11	11	12	14
Jorge López	2	0	9.26	12	0	0	11.2	20	13	12	9	8
Jacob Stallings	0	0	4.50	7	0	0	8.0	12	4	4	0	1
Archie Bradley	0	0	11.05	4	0	0	7.1	13	10	9	3	7
Jeff Lindgren	0	0	5.14	3	0	0	7.0	4	4	4	4	1
Enmanuel De Jesus	0	0	11.37	2	0	0	6.1	9	8	8	4	5
Geoff Hartlieb	0	0	2.25	2	0	0	4.0	2	1	1	3	3
Matt Moore	1	0	0.00	4	0	0	4.0	4	0	0	1	3
Chi Chi González	0	0	7.36	3	0	0	3.2	7	3	3	1	3
Daniel Castano	0	0	21.00	2	0	0	3.0	7	8	7	3	4
Sean Nolin	0	0	18.00	1	0	0	3.0	7	6	6	2	2
Johan Quezada	0	0	40.50	1	0	0	0.2	1	3	3	5	0
Robert Garcia	0	0	0.00	1	0	0	0.1	1	0	0	1	0
Totals	84	78	4.21	162	162	43	1435.1	1340	723	672	514	1490
Rank in NL	5	10	8	—	—	9	7	7	7	8	6	2

Source:Baseball Reference

== Regular season ==
=== Game log ===
Legend
	Marlins win
	Marlins loss
	Postponement
	Clinched playoff spot
**Bold**	Marlins team member

2023 game log: 84–78 (Home: 46–35; Away: 38–43)
March/April: 16–13 (Home: 10–6; Away: 6–7)

#	Date	Opponent	Score	Win	Loss	Save	Attendance	Record	Box/Streak
1	March 30	Mets	3–5	Scherzer (1–0)	**Scott** (0–1)	Robertson (1)	31,397	0–1	L1
2	March 31	Mets	2–1	**Luzardo** (1–0)	Peterson (0–1)	**Puk** (1)	14,797	1–1	W1
3	April 1	Mets	2–6	Megill (1–0)	**Nardi** (0–1)	—	14,695	1–2	L1
4	April 2	Mets	1–5	Senga (1–0)	**Rogers** (0–1)	—	18,322	1–3	L2
5	April 3	Twins	1–11	Mahle (1–0)	**Cueto** (0–1)	—	8,898	1–4	L3
6	April 4	Twins	1–0	**Alcántara** (1–0)	Maeda (0–1)	—	10,668	2–4	W1
7	April 5	Twins	5–2	**Floro** (1–0)	Jax (0–1)	—	8,981	3–4	W2
8	April 7	@ Mets	3–9	Megill (2–0)	**Cabrera** (0–1)	—	43,590	3–5	L1
9	April 8	@ Mets	2–5	Senga (2–0)	**Rogers** (0–2)	Robertson (2)	42,306	3–6	L2
10	April 9	@ Mets	7–2	**Scott** (1–1)	Carrasco (0–2)	—	33,697	4–6	W1
11	April 10	@ Phillies	3–15	Strahm (1–0)	**Alcántara** (1–1)	—	28,642	4–7	L1
12	April 11	@ Phillies	8–4	**Luzardo** (2–0)	Nola (0–2)	—	43,444	5–7	W1
13	April 12	@ Phillies	3–2 (10)	**Puk** (1–0)	Soto (1–2)	—	29,584	6–7	W2
14	April 14	Diamondbacks	5–1	**Rogers** (1–2)	Bumgarner (0–2)	—	10,961	7–7	W3
15	April 15	Diamondbacks	3–2	**Nardi** (1–1)	McGough (0–2)	**Scott** (1)	11,038	8–7	W4
16	April 16	Diamondbacks	0–5	Gallen (2–1)	**Alcántara** (1–2)	—	15,314	8–8	L1
17	April 17	Giants	4–3	**Barnes** (1–0)	Webb (0–4)	**Puk** (2)	8,744	9–8	W1
18	April 18	Giants	4–2	**Cabrera** (1–1)	Junis (2–1)	**Puk** (3)	8,783	10–8	W2
19	April 19	Giants	2–5 (11)	Doval (1–2)	**Smeltzer** (0–1)	Rogers (1)	8,272	10–9	L1
—	April 21	@ Guardians	Postponed (inclement weather); Makeup: April 22						
20	April 22 (1)	@ Guardians	6–1	**Nardi** (2–1)	Bieber (1–1)	—	see 2nd game	11–9	W1
21	April 22 (2)	@ Guardians	3–2	**Garrett** (1–0)	Plesac (1–1)	**Puk** (4)	14,478	12–9	W2
22	April 23	@ Guardians	4–7	Allen (1–0)	**Luzardo** (2–1)	Clase (7)	12,664	12–10	L1
23	April 24	@ Braves	0–11	Strider (3–0)	**Cabrera** (1–2)	—	28,241	12–11	L2
24	April 25	@ Braves	4–7	Morton (3–2)	**Hoeing** (0–1)	—	34,059	12–12	L3
25	April 26	@ Braves	4–6	Tonkin (2–1)	**Floro** (1–1)	Minter (5)	30,282	12–13	L4
26	April 27	@ Braves	5–4	**Puk** (2–0)	Minter (1–3)	**Floro** (1)	32,196	13–13	W1
27	April 28	Cubs	3–2	**Puk** (3–0)	Rucker (1–1)	—	12,340	14–13	W2
28	April 29	Cubs	7–6	**Cabrera** (2–2)	Kilian (0–1)	**Scott** (2)	14,994	15–13	W3
29	April 30	Cubs	4–3	**Scott** (2–1)	Thompson (1–1)	**Puk** (5)	20,345	16–13	W4

May: 13–14 (Home: 5–6; Away: 8–8)

#	Date	Opponent	Score	Win	Loss	Save	Attendance	Record	Box/Streak
30	May 2	Braves	0–6	Elder (3–0)	**Alcántara** (1–3)	—	8,626	16–14	L1
31	May 3	Braves	6–14	McHugh (1–0)	**Garrett** (1–1)	—	10,428	16–15	L2
32	May 4	Braves	3–6	Dodd (2–1)	**Luzardo** (2–2)	Minter (7)	8,295	16–16	L3
33	May 5	@ Cubs	1–4	Steele (5–0)	**Cabrera** (2–3)	Leiter Jr. (1)	31,181	16–17	L4
34	May 6	@ Cubs	2–4	Thompson (2–2)	**Puk** (3–1)	Alzolay (1)	36,418	16–18	L5
35	May 7	@ Cubs	5–4 (14)	**Okert** (1–0)	Alzolay (1–2)	**Nardi** (1)	38,196	17–18	W1
36	May 8	@ Diamondbacks	2–5	Gallen (5–1)	**Garrett** (1–2)	—	9,071	17–19	L1
37	May 9	@ Diamondbacks	6–2	**Luzardo** (3–2)	Pfaadt (0–1)	—	13,608	18–19	W1
38	May 10	@ Diamondbacks	5–4	**Floro** (2–1)	Chafin (2–1)	**Puk** (6)	10,482	19–19	W2
39	May 12	Reds	4–7	Gibaut (2–0)	**Floro** (2–2)	Díaz (8)	13,938	19–20	L1
40	May 13	Reds	5–6	Gibaut (3–0)	**Alcántara** (1–4)	Díaz (9)	11,170	19–21	L2
41	May 14	Reds	3–1	**Scott** (3–1)	Herget (1–1)	**Floro** (2)	11,216	20–21	W1
42	May 16	Nationals	5–4	**Nardi** (3–1)	Harvey (2–1)	—	8,811	21–21	W2
43	May 17	Nationals	4–3	**Cabrera** (3–3)	Gore (3–3)	**Floro** (3)	8,451	22–21	W3
44	May 18	Nationals	5–3	**Pérez** (1–0)	Williams (1–2)	**Floro** (4)	7,752	23–21	W4
45	May 19	@ Giants	3–4	Alexander (4–0)	**Alcántara** (1–5)	Rogers (2)	30,673	23–22	L1
46	May 20	@ Giants	1–0	**Chargois** (1–0)	Rogers (0–4)	**Floro** (5)	31,993	24–22	W1
47	May 21	@ Giants	5–7	Walker (1–0)	**Luzardo** (3–3)	Doval (12)	28,936	24–23	L1
48	May 22	@ Rockies	3–5	Bird (1–0)	**Cabrera** (3–4)	Johnson (9)	20,331	24–24	L2
49	May 23	@ Rockies	4–5	Gomber (4–4)	**Pérez** (1–1)	Johnson (10)	19,470	24–25	L3
50	May 24	@ Rockies	10–2	**Alcántara** (2–5)	Kauffmann (0–2)	—	19,546	25–25	W1
51	May 25	@ Rockies	6–7	Suter (3–0)	**Brazobán** (0–1)	—	20,738	25–26	L1
52	May 26	@ Angels	6–2	**Luzardo** (4–3)	Detmers (0–4)	—	32,130	26–26	W1
53	May 27	@ Angels	8–5 (10)	**Floro** (3–2)	Barría (1–2)	—	38,131	27–26	W2
54	May 28	@ Angels	2–0	**Pérez** (2–1)	Sandoval (3–4)	**Chargois** (1)	36,345	28–26	W3
55	May 30	Padres	4–9	Martinez (3–2)	**Floro** (3–3)	—	11,930	28–27	L1
56	May 31	Padres	2–1	**Okert** (2–0)	Hader (0–1)	—	11,773	29–27	W1

June: 19–8 (Home: 10–4; Away: 9–4)

#	Date	Opponent	Score	Win	Loss	Save	Attendance	Record	Box/Streak
57	June 1	Padres	1–10	Musgrove (3–2)	**Luzardo** (4–4)	—	8,405	29–28	L1
58	June 2	Athletics	4–0	**Cabrera** (4–4)	Fujinami (2–6)	—	8,582	30–28	W1
59	June 3	Athletics	12–1	**Pérez** (3–1)	Medina (0–5)	**Soriano** (1)	10,649	31–28	W2
60	June 4	Athletics	7–5	**Scott** (4–1)	Pruitt (1–3)	**Floro** (6)	12,507	32–28	W3
61	June 5	Royals	9–6	**Garrett** (2–2)	Mayers (1–1)	**Floro** (7)	7,232	33–28	W4
62	June 6	Royals	6–1	**Luzardo** (5–4)	Greinke (1–6)	—	7,342	34–28	W5
63	June 7	Royals	6–1	**Cabrera** (5–4)	Lyles (0–10)	—	7,673	35–28	W6
64	June 9	@ White Sox	1–2	Hendriks (2–0)	**Floro** (3–4)	—	21,033	35–29	L1
65	June 10	@ White Sox	5–1	**Okert** (3–0)	Kelly (1–3)	—	25,793	36–29	W1
66	June 11	@ White Sox	6–5	**Hoeing** (1–1)	Graveman (1–3)	**Puk** (7)	20,888	37–29	W2
67	June 12	@ Mariners	1–8	Miller (4–3)	**Luzardo** (5–5)	—	23,463	37–30	L1
68	June 13	@ Mariners	3–9	Kirby (6–5)	**Cabrera** (5–5)	—	19,510	37–31	L2
69	June 14	@ Mariners	4–1	**Pérez** (4–1)	Castillo (4–5)	—	20,498	38–31	W1
70	June 16	@ Nationals	6–5	**Nardi** (4–1)	Edwards Jr. (1–3)	**Puk** (8)	22,379	39–31	W2
71	June 17	@ Nationals	5–2	**Garrett** (3–2)	Kuhl (0–4)	**Puk** (9)	33,334	40–31	W3
72	June 18	@ Nationals	4–2	**Luzardo** (6–5)	Corbin (4–8)	**Nardi** (2)	25,339	41–31	W4
73	June 19	Blue Jays	11–0	**Brazobán** (1–1)	Berríos (7–5)	—	12,226	42–31	W5
74	June 20	Blue Jays	0–2	García (2–3)	**Scott** (4–2)	Romano (21)	9,809	42–32	L1
75	June 21	Blue Jays	3–6	Gausman (7–3)	**Alcántara** (2–6)	Romano (22)	15,701	42–33	L2
76	June 22	Pirates	6–4	**Brazobán** (2–1)	Mlodzinski (0–1)	**Puk** (10)	8,261	43–33	W1
77	June 23	Pirates	1–3	Ortiz (2–3)	**Puk** (3–2)	Bednar (15)	11,843	43–34	L1
78	June 24	Pirates	4–3 (11)	**Nardi** (5–1)	Perdomo (1–1)	—	24,668	44–34	W1
79	June 25	Pirates	2–0	**Pérez** (5–1)	Oviedo (3–8)	**Puk** (11)	21,552	45–34	W2
80	June 27	@ Red Sox	10–1	**Alcántara** (3–6)	Whitlock (4–3)	—	35,327	46–34	W3
81	June 28	@ Red Sox	6–2	**Garrett** (4–2)	Pivetta (4–5)	**Puk** (12)	34,261	47–34	W4
82	June 29	@ Red Sox	2–0	**Nardi** (6–1)	Bello (5–5)	**Puk** (13)	36,559	48–34	W5
83	June 30	@ Braves	4–16	Soroka (1–1)	**Hoeing** (1–2)	—	42,320	48–35	L1

July: 9–15 (Home: 8–6; Away: 1–9)

#	Date	Opponent	Score	Win	Loss	Save	Attendance	Record	Box/Streak
84	July 1	@ Braves	0–7	Morton (8–6)	**Pérez** (5–2)	—	41,889	48–36	L2
85	July 2	@ Braves	3–6	Strider (10–2)	**Alcántara** (3–7)	Iglesias (14)	40,932	48–37	L3
86	July 3	Cardinals	5–4	**Brazobán** (3–1)	Pallante (2–1)	**Puk** (14)	19,638	49–37	W1
87	July 4	Cardinals	15–2	**Luzardo** (7–5)	Wainwright (3–4)	—	16,437	50–37	W2
88	July 5	Cardinals	10–9	**Puk** (4–2)	Hicks (1–5)	—	9,911	51–37	W3
89	July 6	Cardinals	0–3	Flaherty (6–5)	**Pérez** (5–3)	Hicks (6)	8,763	51–38	L1
90	July 7	Phillies	3–4	Hoffman (2–1)	**Puk** (4–3)	Kimbrel (14)	13,850	51–39	L2
91	July 8	Phillies	5–3	**Garrett** (5–2)	Suárez (2–4)	**Puk** (15)	18,132	52–39	W1
92	July 9	Phillies	7–3	**Luzardo** (8–5)	Nola (8–6)	—	21,159	53–39	W2
**93rd All-Star Game in Seattle**
93	July 14	@ Orioles	2–5	Kremer (10–4)	**Alcántara** (3–8)	Bautista (24)	23,377	53–40	L1
94	July 15	@ Orioles	5–6	Baumann (6–0)	**Brazobán** (3–2)	Bautista (25)	28,593	53–41	L2
95	July 16	@ Orioles	4–5	Bradish (6–4)	**Okert** (3–1)	Coulombe (1)	30,761	53–42	L3
96	July 17	@ Cardinals	4–6	Mikolas (6–5)	**Floro** (3–5)	Hicks (8)	35,619	53–43	L4
97	July 18	@ Cardinals	2–5 (10)	Romero (2–0)	**Puk** (3–4)	—	38,490	53–44	L5
98	July 19	@ Cardinals	4–6	Thompson (2–2)	**Alcántara** (3–9)	Stratton (1)	35,906	53–45	L6
99	July 21	Rockies	1–6	Lambert (2–1)	**Garrett** (5–3)	—	14,092	53–46	L7
100	July 22	Rockies	3–4	Bard (4–1)	**Scott** (4–3)	Lawrence (7)	15,226	53–47	L8
101	July 23	Rockies	3–2 (10)	**Brazobán** (4–2)	Johnson (1–5)	—	14,613	54–47	W1
102	July 25	@ Rays	1–4	Glasnow (4–3)	**Cabrera** (5–6)	Fairbanks (12)	20,508	54–48	L1
103	July 26	@ Rays	7–1	**Alcántara** (4–9)	Eflin (11–6)	—	20,971	55–48	W1
104	July 28	Tigers	6–5	**Chargois** (2–0)	Foley (2–3)	**Puk** (16)	15,918	56–48	W2
105	July 29	Tigers	0–5	Wentz (2–9)	**Cueto** (0–2)	—	32,936	56–49	L1
106	July 30	Tigers	8–6	**López** (5–2)	Holton (0–2)	**Robertson** (15)	18,207	57–49	W1
107	July 31	Phillies	2–4	Walker (12–4)	**Scott** (4–4)	Kimbrel (18)	9,808	57–50	L1

August: 10–17 (Home: 5–9; Away: 5–8)

#	Date	Opponent	Score	Win	Loss	Save	Attendance	Record	Box/Streak
108	August 1	Phillies	1–3	Soto (3–4)	**Robertson** (4–3)	Domínguez (1)	9,600	57–51	L2
109	August 2	Phillies	9–8 (12)	**Scott** (5–4)	Covey (1–3)	—	12,669	58–51	W1
110	August 3	Phillies	2–4	Lorenzen (6–7)	**Cueto** (0–3)	Domínguez (2)	16,709	58–52	L1
111	August 4	@ Rangers	2–6	Montgomery (7–9)	**Luzardo** (8–6)	—	33,362	58–53	L2
112	August 5	@ Rangers	8–9	Gray (7–5)	**Weathers** (1–7)	Smith (20)	38,583	58–54	L3
113	August 6	@ Rangers	0–6	Heaney (9–6)	**Alcántara** (4–10)	—	34,569	58–55	L4
114	August 7	@ Reds	2–5	Williamson (4–2)	**Pérez** (5–4)	Díaz (33)	17,389	58–56	L5
115	August 8	@ Reds	3–2	**Garrett** (6–3)	Sims (3–3)	**Robertson** (16)	26,201	59–56	W1
116	August 9	@ Reds	5–4	**Scott** (6–4)	Díaz (3–4)	**Robertson** (17)	22,352	60–56	W2
117	August 11	Yankees	4–9	Vásquez (2–1)	**Luzardo** (8–7)	—	30,978	60–57	L1
118	August 12	Yankees	3–1	**Alcántara** (5–10)	King (3–5)	—	33,980	61–57	W1
119	August 13	Yankees	8–7	**López** (6–2)	Holmes (4–3)	—	35,043	62–57	W2
120	August 14	Astros	5–1	**Garrett** (7–3)	Valdez (9–8)	—	13,263	63–57	W3
121	August 15	Astros	5–6	Brown (9–8)	**Puk** (5–5)	Pressly (28)	12,981	63–58	L1
122	August 16	Astros	5–12	Verlander (8–6)	**Luzardo** (8–8)	—	14,795	63–59	L2
123	August 18	@ Dodgers	11–3	**Alcántara** (6–10)	Gonsolin (8–5)	—	46,053	64–59	W1
124	August 19 (1)	@ Dodgers	1–3	Yarbrough (6–5)	**Robertson** (4–4)	Phillips (19)	40,895	64–60	L1
125	August 19 (2)	@ Dodgers	1–3	Urías (11–6)	**Garrett** (7–4)	Graterol (6)	52,688	64–61	L2
—	August 20	@ Dodgers	Rescheduled due to Hurricane Hilary;Moved to August 19						
126	August 21	@ Padres	2–6	Wacha (10–2)	**Weathers** (1–8)	—	32,192	64–62	L3
127	August 22	@ Padres	3–0	**Luzardo** (9–8)	Snell (10–9)	**Robertson** (18)	43,430	65–62	W1
128	August 23	@ Padres	0–4	Lugo (5–6)	**Alcántara** (6–11)	—	33,640	65–63	L1
129	August 25	Nationals	4–7	Adon (2–0)	**Garrett** (7–5)	Harvey (10)	12,409	65–64	L2
130	August 26	Nationals	2–3	Weems (4–0)	**Robertson** (4–5)	Finnegan (24)	13,966	65–65	L3
131	August 27	Nationals	2–1	**Hoeing** (2–2)	Williams (6–8)	**Scott** (3)	17,216	66–65	W1
132	August 29	Rays	2–11	Civale (7–4)	**Alcántara** (6–12)	—	10,338	66–66	L1
133	August 30	Rays	0–3 (10)	Armstrong (1–0)	**Robertson** (4–6)	Fairbanks (18)	9,803	66–67	L2
134	August 31	@ Nationals	6–1	**Garrett** (8–5)	Adon (2–1)	—	17,428	67–67	W1

September/October: 17–11 (Home: 8–4; Away: 9–7)

#	Date	Opponent	Score	Win	Loss	Save	Attendance	Record	Box/Streak
135	September 1	@ Nationals	8–5 (11)	**Scott** (7–4)	Garcia (0–1)	—	27,930	68–67	W2
136	September 2	@ Nationals	11–5	**Cueto** (1–3)	Williams (6–9)	—	30,389	69–67	W3
137	September 3	@ Nationals	6–4	**Alcántara** (7–12)	Finnegan (6–4)	**Scott** (4)	26,196	70–67	W4
138	September 5	Dodgers	6–3	**Nardi** (7–1)	Yarbrough (7–6)	**Scott** (5)	11,472	71–67	W5
139	September 6	Dodgers	11–4	**Cabrera** (6–6)	Lynn (10–11)	—	10,591	72–67	W6
140	September 7	Dodgers	0–10	Pepiot (2–0)	**Garrett** (8–6)	—	12,047	72–68	L1
141	September 8	@ Phillies	3–2	**Robertson** (5–6)	Strahm (8–4)	**Scott** (6)	40,190	73–68	W1
142	September 9	@ Phillies	4–8	Hoffman (4–2)	**Cueto** (1–4)	—	40,899	73–69	L1
143	September 10	@ Phillies	5–4	**Robertson** (6–6)	Dominguez (4–4)	**Scott** (7)	40,894	74–69	W1
144	September 11	@ Brewers	0–12	Woodruff (5–1)	**Luzardo** (9–9)	—	21,792	74–70	L1
145	September 12	@ Brewers	1–3	Peralta (12–8)	**Cabrera** (6–7)	Williams (33)	26,466	74–71	L2
146	September 13	@ Brewers	2–0	**Garrett** (9–6)	Rea (5–6)	**Scott** (8)	24,251	75–71	W1
147	September 14	@ Brewers	2–4	Houser (6–4)	**Pérez** (5–5)	Williams (34)	26,529	75–72	L1
148	September 15	Braves	9–6	**Puk** (6–5)	Hand (4–2)	**Scott** (9)	17,692	76–72	W1
149	September 16	Braves	11–5	**Scott** (8–4)	Yates (7–2)	—	24,329	77–72	W2
150	September 17	Braves	16–2	**Luzardo** (10–9)	Morton (14–12)	—	22,051	78–72	W3
151	September 18	Mets	1–2	Bickford (5–5)	**Scott** (8–5)	Ottavino (11)	14,577	78–73	L1
152	September 19	Mets	4–3	**Scott** (9–5)	Gott (0–5)	—	10,897	79–73	W1
153	September 20	Mets	3–8	Senga (12–7)	**Pérez** (5–6)	—	12,045	79–74	L1
154	September 22	Brewers	1–16	Burnes (10–8)	**Okert** (3–2)	—	15,884	79–75	L2
155	September 23	Brewers	5–4	**Nardi** (8–1)	Payamps (6–5)	**Scott** (10)	23,867	80–75	W1
156	September 24	Brewers	6–1	**Cabrera** (7–7)	Peralta (12–10)	—	17,538	81–75	W2
—	September 26	@ Mets	Postponed (unplayable field conditions); Makeup: September 27th						
157	September 27 (1)	@ Mets	2–11	Lucchesi (4–0)	**Garrett** (9–7)	—	see 2nd game	81–76	L1
158	September 27 (2)	@ Mets	4–2	**Moore** (5–1)	Ottavino (1–7)	**Nardi** (3)	24,966	82–76	W1
159	September 28	@ Mets	0–1 (8) (Note: Marlins took the lead in the top of the ninth inning. Game suspended by rain and intended to be completed October 2 if needed for playoff seeding. As Miami had clinched the No. 5 seed, the game was unnecessary. Under Rule 7.02(b)(4)(A), since the Mets had not had their turn in the ninth inning the score reverted to the end of the eighth inning.)	Hartwig (5–2)	**Luzardo** (10–10)	—	31,097	82–77	L1
160	September 29	@ Pirates	4–3	**Brazobán** (5–2)	Selby (2–2)	**Scott** (11)	16,387	83–77	W1
161	September 30	@ Pirates	7–3	**Puk** (7–5)	Priester (3–3)	**Scott** (12)	25,030	84–77	W2
162	October 1	@ Pirates	0–3	Moreta (5–2)	**Hoeing** (2–3)	Bednar (39)	22,954	84–78	L1

== Postseason ==
=== Game log ===
2023 Postseason Game Log: 0–2 (Home: 0–0; Away: 0–2)
NL Wild Card Series: 0–2 (Home: 0–0; Away: 0–2)

#	Date	Opponent	Score	Win	Loss	Save	Attendance	Record	Box/Streak
1	October 3	@ Phillies	1–4	Wheeler (1–0)	Luzardo (0–1)	Kimbrel (1)	45,662	0–1	L1
2	October 4	@ Phillies	1–7	Nola (1–0)	Garrett (0–1)	—	45,738	0–2	L2

=== Postseason rosters ===
Playoff rosters
National League Wild Card Series

- Pitchers: 19 David Robertson 27 Edward Cabrera 29 Braxton Garrett 31 Huascar Brazobán 35 A. J. Puk 43 Andrew Nardi 44 Jesús Luzardo 48 Steven Okert 60 Ryan Weathers 62 George Soriano 66 Tanner Scott 84 J. T. Chargois
- Catchers: 4 Nick Fortes 58 Jacob Stallings
- Infielders: 1 Garrett Hampson 3 Luis Arráez 5 Jon Berti 9 Josh Bell 10 Yuli Gurriel 18 Joey Wendle 36 Jake Burger 63 Xavier Edwards
- Outfielders: 2 Jazz Chisholm Jr. 7 Jesús Sánchez 14 Bryan De La Cruz
- Designated hitters: 12 Jorge Soler

== Farm system ==
Level	Team	League	Manager
Triple-A	Jacksonville Jumbo Shrimp	International League	Al Pedrique
Double-A	Pensacola Blue Wahoos	Southern League	Kevin Randel
High-A	Beloit Sky Carp	Midwest League	Billy Gardner Jr.
Low-A	Jupiter Hammerheads	Florida State League	Nelson Prada
Rookie	FCL Marlins	Florida Complex League	Robert Rodriguez
Rookie	DSL Marlins	Dominican Summer League	Raymond Nunez

== Notes ==
-->
