= 2023 Los Angeles Angels season =

Major League Baseball season

2023 Los Angeles Angels
- League: American League
- Division: West
- Ballpark: Angel Stadium
- City: Anaheim, California
- Record: 73–89 (.451)
- Divisional place: 4th
- Owner: Arte Moreno
- General manager: Perry Minasian
- Manager: Phil Nevin
- Television: Bally Sports West (Wayne Randazzo/Matt Vasgersian/Patrick O'Neal, Mark Gubicza)
- Radio: KLAA (AM 830); KSPN (AM 710); Angels Radio Network; Spanish: KWKW (AM 1330)
- Stats: ESPN.com; Baseball Reference

The 2023 Los Angeles Angels season was the 63rd season of the Angels franchise in the American League, the 58th in Anaheim, and their 58th season playing their home games at Angel Stadium. Chasing history to try and reach their first playoff appearance since 2014, the Angels started 40–32, but subsequently collapsed and, on September 16, the Angels were eliminated from postseason contention, for the ninth straight year. They repeat their record from the previous year, which was 73–89. They set a mark with their eighth consecutive losing season, eclipsing the mark previously set by the 1971–1977 teams. The Angels drew an average home attendance of 32,599 in 81 home games in the 2023 MLB season, the 13th highest in the league. This was two-way superstar Shohei Ohtani's last season with the team after signing a record free agent contract with the crosstown rival Los Angeles Dodgers.

== Offseason ==
The Angels finished the 2022 season 73–89, 33 games out of first place. They missed the playoffs for the eighth consecutive season and now share the longest current playoff drought with the Tigers. Both teams have not made the playoffs since 2014.

=== Rule changes ===
Pursuant to the CBA, new rule changes will be in place for the 2023 season:

- institution of a pitch clock between pitches;
- limits on pickoff attempts per plate appearance;
- limits on defensive shifts requiring two infielders to be on either side of second and be within the boundary of the infield; and
- larger bases (increased to 18-inch squares);

== Opening Day lineup ==
The team opened the season with a 2–1 loss to the Oakland Athletics at Oakland Coliseum on March 30.

Order	No.	Player	Pos.
1	3	Taylor Ward	LF
2	27	Mike Trout	CF
3	17	Shohei Ohtani	P/DH
4	6	Anthony Rendon	3B
5	2	Luis Rengifo	2B
6	12	Hunter Renfroe	RF
7	23	Brandon Drury	1B
8	10	Gio Urshela	SS
9	14	Logan O'Hoppe	C
—	17	Shohei Ohtani	P

=== Angels team leaders ===
Batting
Batting average†	Shohei Ohtani	.304
RBIs	Shohei Ohtani	95
Stolen bases	Shohei Ohtani	20
Runs scored	Shohei Ohtani	102
Home runs	Shohei Ohtani	44
Games played	Shohei Ohtani	135
Pitching
ERA‡	No qualifiers	—
WHIP	No qualifiers	—
Holds	Matt Moore	20
Wins	Shohei Ohtani	10
Innings pitched	Reid Detmers	148.1
Strikeouts	Reid Detmers	168
Saves	Carlos Estévez	31
Games pitched	Carlos Estévez	63

† Minimum 3.1 plate appearances per team games played ‡ Minimum 1 inning pitched per team games played

== Regular season ==
=== June ===
On June 15, Gio Urshela sustained an injury, later revealed to be a fractured pelvis and will be out for a significant amount of time. With both 3rd basemen options (Gio Urshela, Anthony Rendon) out with injuries, on June 23, the Angels traded minor league players Coleman Crow, and Landon Marceaux to the New York Mets for Eduardo Escobar.

On Saturday, June 24, the Angels recorded new team records for both runs and hits in a 25-1 blowout over the Colorado Rockies. Despite outscoring the Rockies 32-12 in the series, the Angels lost the series, making the second worst run differential of a team who won a baseball series. Additionally, on June 25, the day after the 25-1 blowout, the Angels acquired Mike Moustakas for minor league player Connor Van Scoyoc.

=== July ===
On July 26, the Angels traded minor leaguers Ky Bush and Edgar Quero to the Chicago White Sox for Lucas Giolito and Reynaldo Lopez. When asked about the trade, General Manager Perry Minasian said: "For this team to be in this position with the injuries we’ve had, I felt like I owed it to the group to give them a better chance to win." A day after the trade, the Angels faced off against the Detroit Tigers in a doubleheader. The Angels won both games as Shohei Ohtani pitched a one hit complete game shut up in Game 1 and homered twice in Game 2.

During the second game of a three game series with the Toronto Blue Jays on July 29, Taylor Ward was struck in the head by a 91mph fastball by Alek Manoah. As the result, Taylor Ward suffered facial fractures and is put on the injury list. The following day, on July 30, the Angels traded minor leaguers Jake Madden, and Mason Albright to the Colorado Rockies for Randal Grichuk, and C.J. Cron.

== Injuries ==
2023 Notable Injuries
Player	Position	Date	Injury	Length	Return Date
Max Stassi	Catcher	3/5/23	Hip discomfort/Personal	No timetable for return	
Logan O'Hoppe	Catcher	4/25/23	Shoulder surgery	4–6 months	
Jose Suarez	Pitcher	5/7/23	Strained shoulder	2–3 months	
Jose Quijada	Pitcher	5/18/23	Tommy John Surgery	Out for 2023 season	
Austin Warren	Pitcher	5/18/23	Tommy John Surgery	Out for 2023 season	
Ben Joyce	Pitcher	6/9/23	Ulnar neuritis	No timetable for return	
Gio Urshela	Infielder	6/15/23	Fractured pelvis	Out for 2023 season	
Brandon Drury	Infielder	6/29/23	Shoulder contusion	No timetable for return	
Sam Bachman	Pitcher	7/3/23	Shoulder inflammation	No timetable for return	
Mike Trout	Outfielder	7/5/23	Hand surgery (fractured hamate)	4–8 weeks	
Jo Adell	Outfielder	7/8/23	Strained oblique	No timetable for return	
Chris Devenski	Pitcher	7/15/23	Strained hamstring	No timetable for return	
Anthony Rendon	Infielder	5/13/23	Groin strain	1–2 weeks	6/6/23
Anthony Rendon	Infielder	6/15/23	Wrist contusion	1–2 weeks	6/30/23
Anthony Rendon	Infielder	7/4/23	Shin bone bruise	No timetable for return	
Zach Neto	Infielder	6/14/23	Strained oblique	No timetable for return	7/14/23
Matt Moore	Pitcher	5/23/23	Strained oblique	No timetable for return	7/14/23
Aaron Loup	Pitcher	5/4/23	Strained hamstring	No timetable for return	5/21/23
Ryan Tepera	Pitcher	4/15/23	Shoulder inflammation	No timetable for return	5/2/23
Taylor Ward	Outfielder	7/29/23	Facial fracture	Questionable for 2023	

== Game log ==
The Angels opened up the 2023 season on the road at Oakland on March 30, losing 2-1 to the Athletics.

Legend
	Angels win
	Angels loss
	All-Star Game
	Postponement
	Eliminated from playoff race
**Bold**	Angels team member

2023 Game Log: 73–89 (Home: 38–43; Away: 35–46)
March/April: 15–14 (Home: 8–5; Away: 7–9)

#	Date	Opponent	Score	Win	Loss	Save	Attendance	Record	Box/Streak
1	March 30	@ Athletics	1–2	May (1–0)	**Loup** (0–1)	Jiménez (1)	26,805	0–1	L1
2	April 1	@ Athletics	13–1	**Sandoval** (1–0)	Fujinami (0–1)	**Davidson** (1)	15,757	1–1	W1
3	April 2	@ Athletics	6–0	**Anderson** (1–0)	Waldichuk (0–1)	—	14,638	2–1	W2
4	April 3	@ Mariners	7–3	**Tepera** (1–0)	Kirby (0–1)	—	18,877	3–1	W3
5	April 4	@ Mariners	2–11	Castillo (1–0)	**Suárez** (0–1)	—	19,255	3–2	L1
6	April 5	@ Mariners	4–3	**Ohtani** (1–0)	Flexen (0–1)	**Quijada** (1)	25,648	4–2	W1
7	April 7	Blue Jays	3–4	Bassitt (1–1)	**Herget** (0–1)	Romano (4)	44,735	4–3	L1
8	April 8	Blue Jays	9–5	**Barría** (1–0)	Berríos (0–2)	—	44,534	5–3	W1
9	April 9	Blue Jays	11–12 (10)	Romano (1–0)	**Estévez** (0–1)	Mayza (1)	31,092	5–4	L1
10	April 10	Nationals	4–6	Corbin (1–2)	**Davidson** (0–1)	Finnegan (2)	19,557	5–5	L2
11	April 11	Nationals	2–0	**Ohtani** (2–0)	Gray (0–3)	**Estévez** (1)	27,390	6–5	W1
12	April 12	Nationals	3–2	**Moore** (1–0)	Thompson (0–1)	**Quijada** (2)	17,780	7–5	W2
13	April 14	@ Red Sox	3–5	Winckowski (1–0)	**Herget** (0–2)	Jansen (3)	36,680	7–6	L1
14	April 15	@ Red Sox	7–9	Brasier (1–0)	**Tepera** (1–1)	Jansen (4)	36,594	7–7	L2
15	April 16	@ Red Sox	1–2	Whitlock (1–1)	**Detmers** (0–1)	Brasier (1)	34,790	7–8	L3
16	April 17	@ Red Sox	5–4	**Davidson** (1–1)	Bello (0–1)	**Estévez** (2)	34,942	8–8	W1
17	April 18	@ Yankees	5–2	**Wantz** (1–0)	Schmidt (0–1)	**Quijada** (3)	37,883	9–8	W2
18	April 19	@ Yankees	2–3 (10)	Hamilton (1–1)	**Moore** (1–1)	—	38,131	9–9	L1
19	April 20	@ Yankees	3–9	Cortés Jr. (3–0)	**Sandoval** (1–1)	—	39,315	9–10	L2
20	April 21	Royals	2–0	**Ohtani** (3–0)	Yarbrough (0–2)	**Quijada** (4)	44,741	10–10	W1
21	April 22	Royals	8–11	Cuas (1–0)	**Quijada** (0–1)	Barlow (2)	44,148	10–11	L1
22	April 23	Royals	4–3	**Warren** (1–0)	Lyles (0–4)	**Estévez** (3)	36,016	11–11	W1
23	April 24	Athletics	10–11 (10)	Oller (1–0)	**Barría** (1–1)	Familia (2)	23,814	11–12	L1
24	April 25	Athletics	5–3	**Canning** (1–0)	Miller (0–1)	**Estévez** (4)	26,971	12–12	W1
25	April 26	Athletics	11–3	**Sandoval** (2–1)	Medina (0–1)	—	24,524	13–12	W2
26	April 27	Athletics	8–7	**Ohtani** (4–0)	Sears (0–2)	**Estévez** (5)	21,741	14–12	W3
27	April 28	@ Brewers	1–2	Strzelecki (2–0)	**Loup** (0–2)	Williams (4)	24,787	14–13	L1
28	April 29	@ Brewers	5–7	Burnes (3–1)	**Detmers** (0–2)	Williams (5)	39,198	14–14	L2
29	April 30	@ Brewers	3–0	**Suárez** (1–1)	Rea (0–2)	**Estévez** (6)	33,557	15–14	W1

May: 15–13 (Home: 7–8; Away: 8–5)

#	Date	Opponent	Score	Win	Loss	Save	Attendance	Record	Box/Streak
30	May 2	@ Cardinals	5–1	**Sandoval** (3–1)	Matz (0–4)	—	37,048	16–14	W2
31	May 3	@ Cardinals	6–4	**Tepera** (2–1)	Gallegos (1–1)	**Estévez** (7)	42,148	17–14	W3
32	May 4	@ Cardinals	11–7	**Canning** (2–0)	Flaherty (2–4)	—	40,508	18–14	W4
33	May 5	Rangers	5–4 (10)	**Estévez** (1–1)	Smith (0–2)	—	39,073	19–14	W5
34	May 6	Rangers	1–10	Eovaldi (4–2)	**Detmers** (0–3)	—	37,409	19–15	L1
35	May 7	Rangers	8–16	Sborz (1–1)	**Suárez** (1–2)	—	41,641	19–16	L2
36	May 8	Astros	6–4	**Moore** (2–1)	Montero (0–2)	**Estévez** (8)	26,064	20–16	W1
37	May 9	Astros	1–3	Valdez (3–4)	**Ohtani** (4–1)	Pressly (5)	29,018	20–17	L1
38	May 10	Astros	4–5	Javier (3–1)	**Canning** (2–1)	Pressly (6)	20,420	20–18	L2
39	May 12	@ Guardians	5–4	**Moore** (3–1)	Clase (1–3)	**Estévez** (9)	22,550	21–18	W1
40	May 13	@ Guardians	6–8	Morgan (2–0)	**Tepera** (2–2)	Stephan (2)	27,644	21–19	L1
41	May 14	@ Guardians	3–4	Karinchak (1–4)	**Sandoval** (3–2)	Clase (14)	23,175	21–20	L2
42	May 15	@ Orioles	9–5	**Ohtani** (5–1)	Rodriguez (2–1)	—	20,148	22–20	W1
43	May 16	@ Orioles	3–7	Kremer (5–1)	**Silseth** (0–1)	—	13,244	22–21	L1
44	May 17	@ Orioles	1–3	Bradish (2–1)	**Canning** (2–2)	Bautista (11)	15,702	22–22	L2
45	May 18	@ Orioles	6–5	**Devenski** (1–0)	Baker (3–1)	**Estévez** (10)	27,778	23–22	W1
46	May 19	Twins	5–4	**Weiss** (1–0)	Jax (2–5)	**Estévez** (11)	31,079	24–22	W2
47	May 20	Twins	2–6	Varland (2–0)	**Sandoval** (3–3)	—	35,688	24–23	L1
48	May 21	Twins	4–2	**Devenski** (2–0)	López (2–3)	**Estévez** (12)	42,138	25–23	W1
49	May 22	Red Sox	2–1	**Silseth** (1–1)	Crawford (1–2)	—	25,314	26–23	W2
50	May 23	Red Sox	4–0	**Canning** (3–2)	Bello (3–2)	—	25,798	27–23	W3
51	May 24	Red Sox	7–3	**Anderson** (2–0)	Paxton (1–1)	—	26,596	28–23	W4
52	May 26	Marlins	2–6	Luzardo (4–3)	**Detmers** (0–4)	—	32,130	28–24	L1
53	May 27	Marlins	5–8 (10)	Floro (3–2)	**Barría** (1–2)	—	38,131	28–25	L2
54	May 28	Marlins	0–2	Pérez (2–1)	**Sandoval** (3–4)	Chargois (1)	36,345	28–26	L3
55	May 29	@ White Sox	6–4	**Canning** (4–2)	Kopech (3–5)	**Estévez** (13)	23,599	29–26	W1
56	May 30	@ White Sox	3–7	Giolito (4–4)	**Anderson** (2–1)	—	22,135	29–27	L1
57	May 31	@ White Sox	12–5	**Barría** (2–2)	Lynn (4–6)	**Davidson** (2)	17,015	30–27	W1

June: 14–13 (Home: 7–6; Away: 7–7)

#	Date	Opponent	Score	Win	Loss	Save	Attendance	Record	Box/Streak
58	June 1	@ Astros	2–5	Blanco (1–0)	**Detmers** (0–5)	Pressly (11)	34,037	30–28	L1
59	June 2	@ Astros	2–6	Valdez (6–4)	**Ohtani** (5–2)	—	38,692	30–29	L2
60	June 3	@ Astros	6–9	Javier (7–1)	**Sandoval** (3–5)	—	39,222	30–30	L3
61	June 4	@ Astros	2–1	**Devenski** (3–0)	Maton (0–1)	**Estévez** (14)	40,831	31–30	W1
62	June 6	Cubs	7–4	**Anderson** (3–1)	Hughes (0–3)	**Estévez** (15)	27,716	32–30	W2
63	June 7	Cubs	6–2	**Joyce** (1–0)	Taillon (1–4)	—	28,817	33–30	W3
64	June 8	Cubs	3–1	**Detmers** (1–5)	Smyly (5–4)	**Estévez** (16)	28,179	34–30	W4
65	June 9	Mariners	5–4	**Webb** (1–0)	Castillo (4–4)	**Estévez** (17)	36,064	35–30	W5
66	June 10	Mariners	2–6	Speier (2–1)	**Sandoval** (3–6)	—	38,454	35–31	L1
67	June 11	Mariners	9–4	**Canning** (5–2)	Gilbert (4–4)	—	39,405	36–31	W1
68	June 12	@ Rangers	9–6 (12)	**Bachman** (1–0)	Ragans (2–3)	—	26,667	37–31	W2
69	June 13	@ Rangers	7–3	**Herget** (1–2)	White (0–1)	**Estévez** (18)	25,832	38–31	W3
70	June 14	@ Rangers	3–6	Sborz (3–2)	**Herget** (1–3)	—	25,406	38–32	L1
71	June 15	@ Rangers	5–3	**Ohtani** (6–2)	Eovaldi (9–3)	**Webb** (1)	35,092	39–32	W1
72	June 16	@ Royals	3–0	**Sandoval** (4–6)	Singer (4–6)	**Bachman** (1)	19,384	40–32	W2
73	June 17	@ Royals	9–10	Chapman (2–2)	**Devenski** (3–1)	—	21,056	40–33	L1
74	June 18	@ Royals	5–2	**Anderson** (4–1)	Greinke (1–7)	**Estévez** (19)	24,385	41–33	W1
75	June 20	Dodgers	0–2	Kershaw (9–4)	**Devenski** (3–2)	Phillips (8)	44,703	41–34	L1
76	June 21	Dodgers	0–2	González (2–2)	**Ohtani** (6–3)	Phillips (9)	44,760	41–35	L2
77	June 23	@ Rockies	4–7	Johnson (1–3)	**Bachman** (1–1)	Lawrence (3)	47,085	41–36	L3
78	June 24	@ Rockies	25–1	**Canning** (6–2)	Anderson (0–2)	—	45,274	42–36	W1
79	June 25	@ Rockies	3–4	Gomber (5–7)	**Anderson** (4–2)	Lawrence (4)	40,213	42–37	L1
80	June 26	White Sox	2–1	**Estévez** (2–1)	López (2–5)	—	28,554	43–37	W1
81	June 27	White Sox	4–2	**Ohtani** (7–3)	Kopech (3–7)	**Estévez** (20)	33,637	44–37	W2
82	June 28	White Sox	5–11	Giolito (6–5)	**Barría** (2–3)	—	29,861	44–38	L1
83	June 29	White Sox	7–9	Lynn (5–8)	**Sandoval** (4–7)	—	27,630	44–39	L2
84	June 30	Diamondbacks	2–6	Henry (5–1)	**Canning** (6–3)	—	34,957	44–40	L3

July: 12–11 (Home: 7–4; Away: 5–7)

#	Date	Opponent	Score	Win	Loss	Save	Attendance	Record	Box/Streak
85	July 1	Diamondbacks	1–3	Nelson (5–4)	**Bachman** (1–2)	McGough (7)	44,472	44–41	L2
86	July 2	Diamondbacks	5–2	**Detmers** (2–5)	Gallen (10–3)	**Estévez** (21)	29,167	45–41	W1
87	July 3	@ Padres	3–10	Snell (5–7)	**Barría** (2–4)	—	45,101	45–42	L1
88	July 4	@ Padres	5–8	Musgrove (7–2)	**Ohtani** (7–4)	Hader (19)	44,725	45–43	L2
89	July 5	@ Padres	3–5	Martinez (4–3)	**Webb** (1–1)	Hader (20)	43,401	45–44	L3
90	July 7	@ Dodgers	4–11	Gonsolin (5–3)	**Canning** (6–4)	—	52,214	45–45	L4
91	July 8	@ Dodgers	5–10	Grove (1–2)	**Detmers** (2–6)	—	53,057	45–46	L5
ASG	July 11	NL @ AL	3–2	Doval (1–0)	Bautista (0–1)	Kimbrel (1)	47,159	—	N/A
92	July 14	Astros	5–7	Maton (2–2)	**Ohtani** (7–5)	Pressly (21)	38,850	45–47	L6
93	July 15	Astros	13–12 (10)	**Estévez** (3–1)	Maton (2–3)	—	37,523	46–47	W1
94	July 16	Astros	8–9	Montero (2–3)	**Barría** (2–5)	Maton (1)	34,679	46–48	L1
95	July 17	Yankees	4–3 (10)	**Loup** (1–2)	Ramirez (0–2)	—	41,180	47–48	W1
96	July 18	Yankees	5–1	**Sandoval** (5–7)	Germán (5–6)	—	41,556	48–48	W2
97	July 19	Yankees	7–3	**Silseth** (2–1)	Rodón (0–3)	—	39,141	49–48	W3
98	July 21	Pirates	8–5	**Ohtani** (8–5)	Oviedo (3–11)	**Estévez** (22)	40,309	50–48	W4
99	July 22	Pirates	0–3	Bido (2–1)	**Detmers** (2–7)	Bednar (19)	37,240	50–49	L1
100	July 23	Pirates	7–5	**Anderson** (5–2)	Keller (9–6)	**Estévez** (23)	28,385	51–49	W1
101	July 25	@ Tigers	7–6 (10)	**Estévez** (4–1)	Lange (5–3)	**Loup** (1)	24,856	52–49	W2
—	July 26	@ Tigers	Postponed (inclement weather); Makeup: July 27						
102	July 27 (1)	@ Tigers	6–0	**Ohtani** (9–5)	Lorenzen (5–7)	—	see 2nd game	53–49	W3
103	July 27 (2)	@ Tigers	11–4	**Sandoval** (6–7)	Manning (3–2)	—	30,238	54–49	W4
104	July 28	@ Blue Jays	1–4	Gausman (8–5)	**Giolito** (6–7)	García (3)	42,106	54–50	L1
105	July 29	@ Blue Jays	1–6	Cabrera (2–1)	**Detmers** (2–8)	—	41,997	54–51	L2
106	July 30	@ Blue Jays	3–2 (10)	**Estévez** (5–1)	García (3–4)	—	41,810	55–51	W1
107	July 31	@ Braves	4–1	**Silseth** (3–1)	Morton (10–9)	**López** (5)	41,173	56–51	W2

August: 8–19 (Home: 3–10; Away: 5–9)

#	Date	Opponent	Score	Win	Loss	Save	Attendance	Record	Box/Streak
108	August 1	@ Braves	1–5	Strider (12–3)	**Sandoval** (6–8)	—	41,777	56–52	L1
109	August 2	@ Braves	5–12	Chirinos (5–4)	**Giolito** (6–8)	—	36,495	56–53	L2
110	August 3	Mariners	3–5	Campbell (2–0)	**Estévez** (5–2)	Muñoz (4)	37,701	56–54	L3
111	August 4	Mariners	7–9	Topa (2–3)	**López** (2–6)	Brash (2)	34,479	56–55	L4
112	August 5	Mariners	2–3	Kirby (10–8)	**Anderson** (5–3)	Muñoz (5)	35,318	56–56	L5
113	August 6	Mariners	2–3 (10)	Saucedo (3–1)	**Barría** (2–6)	—	29,960	56–57	L6
114	August 7	Giants	3–8	Rogers (6–4)	**Estévez** (5–3)	—	32,582	56–58	L7
115	August 8	Giants	7–5	**Giolito** (7–8)	Alexander (6–2)	**Leone** (1)	31,974	57–58	W1
116	August 9	Giants	4–1	**Ohtani** (10–5)	Beck (3–1)	**Estévez** (24)	36,980	58–58	W2
117	August 11	@ Astros	3–11	Verlander (7–6)	**Detmers** (2–9)	—	41,152	58–59	L1
118	August 12	@ Astros	3–11	France (9–3)	**Anderson** (5–4)	—	40,311	58–60	L2
119	August 13	@ Astros	2–1	**Silseth** (4–1)	Urquidy (2–3)	**Estévez** (25)	40,333	59–60	W1
120	August 14	@ Rangers	0–12	Scherzer (12–4)	**Sandoval** (6–9)	—	27,743	59–61	L1
121	August 15	@ Rangers	3–7	Montgomery (8–10)	**Giolito** (7–9)	—	26,166	59–62	L2
122	August 16	@ Rangers	2–0	**Detmers** (3–9)	Gray (8–6)	**Estévez** (26)	31,004	60–62	W1
123	August 18	Rays	6–9 (10)	Fairbanks (1–4)	**Estévez** (5–4)	Kittredge (1)	38,297	60–63	L1
124	August 19 (1)	Rays	7–6	**Canning** (7–4)	Glasnow (6–4)	**López** (6)	27,309	61–63	W1
125	August 19 (2)	Rays	4–18	Eflin (13–7)	**Sandoval** (6–10)	—	33,803	61–64	L1
—	August 20	Rays	Rescheduled due to Hurricane Hilary;Moved to August 19						
—	August 21	Reds	Postponed (Effects from Hurricane Hilary); Makeup: August 23						
126	August 22	Reds	3–4	Ashcraft (7–8)	**Giolito** (7–10)	Díaz (34)	26,583	61–65	L2
127	August 23 (1)	Reds	4–9	Farmer (4–5)	**Anderson** (5–5)	—	28,776	61–66	L3
128	August 23 (2)	Reds	3–7	Sims (4–3)	**Detmers** (3–10)	—	24,596	61–67	L4
129	August 25	@ Mets	3–1	**Sandoval** (7–10)	Senga (10–7)	**Estévez** (27)	38,271	62–67	W1
130	August 26	@ Mets	5–3	**Loup** (2–2)	Carrasco (3–8)	**Estévez** (28)	35,890	63–67	W2
131	August 27	@ Mets	2–3	Ottavino (1–4)	**López** (2–7)	—	38,341	63–68	L1
132	August 28	@ Phillies	4–6	Walker (14–5)	**Giolito** (7–11)	Kimbrel (21)	38,142	63–69	L2
133	August 29	@ Phillies	7–12	Lorenzen (8–8)	**Anderson** (5–6)	—	36,096	63–70	L3
134	August 30	@ Phillies	10–8	**Moore** (4–1)	Kimbrel (7–5)	**Estévez** (29)	34,655	64–70	W1

September/October: 9–19 (Home: 6–10; Away: 3–9)

#	Date	Opponent	Score	Win	Loss	Save	Attendance	Record	Box/Streak
135	September 1	@ Athletics	2–9	Sears (3–11)	**Sandoval** (7–11)	—	12,073	64–71	L1
136	September 2	@ Athletics	1–2	Blackburn (4–4)	**Canning** (7–5)	May (16)	13,709	64–72	L2
137	September 3	@ Athletics	6–10	Pérez (1–1)	**Soriano** (0–1)	May (17)	12,425	64–73	L3
138	September 4	Orioles	3–6	Rodriguez (5–3)	**Rosenberg** (0–1)	Canó (6)	29,214	64–74	L4
139	September 5	Orioles	4–5 (10)	Krehbiel (1–0)	**Soriano** (0–2)	Fujinami (2)	22,496	64–75	L5
140	September 6	Orioles	3–10	Gibson (14–8)	**Sandoval** (7–12)	—	29,021	64–76	L6
141	September 7	Guardians	3–2	**Soriano** (1–2)	Clase (2–8)	—	24,288	65–76	W1
142	September 8	Guardians	3–6	Allen (7–7)	**Canning** (7–6)	Clase (39)	34,209	65–77	L1
143	September 9	Guardians	6–2	**Anderson** (6–6)	Giolito (7–13)	—	27,233	66–77	W1
144	September 10	Guardians	2–1	**Rosenberg** (1–1)	Bibee (10–4)	**Estévez** (30)	26,134	67–77	W2
145	September 11	@ Mariners	8–5 (11)	**Marte** (1–0)	Thornton (0–2)	**Herget** (1)	37,807	68–77	W3
146	September 12	@ Mariners	0–8	Woo (3–4)	**Sandoval** (7–13)	—	33,771	68–78	L1
147	September 13	@ Mariners	2–3	Castillo (13–7)	**Suárez** (1–3)	Muñoz (13)	31,250	68–79	L2
148	September 15	Tigers	2–11	Skubal (6–3)	**Canning** (7–7)	—	37,822	68–80	L3
149	September 16	Tigers	4–5 (10)	Lange (7–4)	**Soriano** (1–3)	Vest (1)	35,022	68–81	L4
150	September 17	Tigers	3–5	Wentz (3–11)	**Rosenberg** (1–2)	Lange (24)	34,943	68–82	L5
151	September 19	@ Rays	2–6	Stephenson (3–4)	**Loup** (2–3)	—	15,176	68–83	L6
152	September 20	@ Rays	8–3	**Wantz** (2–0)	Civale (7–4)	—	15,145	69–83	W1
153	September 21	@ Rays	4–5	Kittredge (2–0)	**Estévez** (5–5)	—	12,966	69–84	L1
154	September 22	@ Twins	6–8	López (11–8)	**Daniel** (0–1)	Durán (27)	32,006	69–85	L2
155	September 23	@ Twins	1–0	**Rosenberg** (2–2)	Gray (8–8)	**Estévez** (31)	31,403	70–85	W1
156	September 24	@ Twins	3–9	Ryan (11–10)	**Fulmer** (0–1)	—	24,232	70–86	L1
157	September 25	Rangers	1–5	Gray (9–8)	**Herget** (2–4)	—	25,208	70–87	L2
158	September 26	Rangers	9–3	**Detmers** (4–10)	Bradford (4–3)	—	26,976	71–87	W1
159	September 27	Rangers	0–5	Dunning (12–6)	**Canning** (7–8)	—	30,020	71–88	L1
160	September 29	Athletics	5–1	**Daniel** (1–1)	Waldichuk (4–9)	—	32,333	72–88	W1
161	September 30	Athletics	3–7	Boyle (2–0)	**Joyce** (1–1)	—	31,633	72–89	L1
162	October 1	Athletics	7–3	**Fulmer** (1–1)	Sears (5–14)	—	26,539	73–89	W1

== Season standings ==
=== American League West ===
AL West
Team	W	L	Pct.	GB	Home	Road
Houston Astros	90	72	.556	—	39‍–‍42	51‍–‍30
Texas Rangers	90	72	.556	—	50‍–‍31	40‍–‍41
Seattle Mariners	88	74	.543	2	45‍–‍36	43‍–‍38
Los Angeles Angels	73	89	.451	17	38‍–‍43	35‍–‍46
Oakland Athletics	50	112	.309	40	26‍–‍55	24‍–‍57

=== American League Wild Card ===
Division leaders
Team	W	L	Pct.
Baltimore Orioles	101	61	.623
Houston Astros	90	72	.556
Minnesota Twins	87	75	.537

Wild Card teams (Top 3 teams qualify for postseason)
Team	W	L	Pct.	GB
Tampa Bay Rays	99	63	.611	+10
Texas Rangers	90	72	.556	+1
Toronto Blue Jays	89	73	.549	—
Seattle Mariners	88	74	.543	1
New York Yankees	82	80	.506	7
Boston Red Sox	78	84	.481	11
Detroit Tigers	78	84	.481	11
Cleveland Guardians	76	86	.469	13
Los Angeles Angels	73	89	.451	16
Chicago White Sox	61	101	.377	28
Kansas City Royals	56	106	.346	33
Oakland Athletics	50	112	.309	39

=== Record vs. opponents ===
==== Record vs. American League ====
2023 American League record Source: MLB Standings Grid – 2023
Team	BAL	BOS	CWS	CLE	DET	HOU	KC	LAA	MIN	NYY	OAK	SEA	TB	TEX	TOR	NL
Baltimore	—	7–6	4–2	3–4	6–1	3–3	5–1	5–2	4–2	7–6	6–1	4–2	8–5	3–3	10–3	26–20
Boston	6–7	—	2–4	3–3	5–1	2–5	5–2	3–4	4–3	9–4	4–2	3–3	2–11	3–3	7–6	20–26
Chicago	2–4	4–2	—	8–5	5–8	3–4	6–7	3–4	4–9	4–2	3–4	2–4	1–6	1–5	0–6	15–31
Cleveland	4–3	3–3	5–8	—	4–9	2–4	7–6	3–4	7–6	2–4	5–1	4–3	3–3	3–3	4–3	20–26
Detroit	1–6	1–5	8–5	9–4	—	3–3	10–3	3–3	8–5	2–5	3–4	3–3	1–5	3–4	2–4	21–25
Houston	3–3	5–2	4–3	4–2	3–3	—	1–5	9–4	2–4	2–5	10–3	4–9	3–3	9–4	3–4	28–18
Kansas City	1–5	2–5	7–6	6–7	3–10	5–1	—	2–4	4–9	2–4	2–4	1–6	3–4	1–5	1–6	16–30
Los Angeles	2–5	4–3	4–3	4–3	3–3	4–9	4–2	—	3–3	4–2	7–6	5–8	2–4	6–7	2–4	19–27
Minnesota	2–4	3–4	9–4	6–7	5–8	4–2	9–4	3–3	—	4–3	5–1	3–4	1–5	5–2	3–3	25–21
New York	6–7	4–9	2–4	4–2	5–2	5–2	4–2	2–4	3–4	—	5–1	4–2	5–8	3–4	7–6	23–23
Oakland	1–6	2–4	4–3	1–5	4–3	3–10	4–2	6–7	1–5	1–5	—	1–12	2–5	4–9	2–4	14–32
Seattle	2–4	3–3	4–2	3–4	3–3	9–4	6–1	8–5	4–3	2–4	12–1	—	3–4	4–9	3–3	22–24
Tampa Bay	5–8	11–2	6–1	3–3	5–1	3–3	4–3	4–2	5–1	8–5	5–2	4–3	—	2–4	7–6	27–19
Texas	3–3	3–3	5–1	3–3	4–3	4–9	5–1	7–6	2–5	4–3	9–4	9–4	4–2	—	6–1	22–24
Toronto	3–10	6–7	6–0	3–4	4–2	4–3	6–1	4–2	3–3	6–7	4–2	3–3	6–7	1–6	—	30–16

Updated with the results of all games through October 1, 2023.

==== Record vs. National League ====
2023 American League record vs. National League Source: MLB Standings
Team	ARI	ATL	CHC	CIN	COL	LAD	MIA	MIL	NYM	PHI	PIT	SD	SF	STL	WSH
Baltimore	2–1	1–2	1–2	1–2	2–1	1–2	3–0	1–2	3–0	1–2	2–1	1–2	2–1	1–2	4–0
Boston	2–1	3–1	2–1	1–2	1–2	1–2	0–3	2–1	2–1	2–1	0–3	2–1	1–2	0–3	1–2
Chicago	1–2	2–1	1–3	2–1	1–2	1–2	1–2	0–3	1–2	1–2	1–2	0–3	1–2	1–2	1–2
Cleveland	1–2	1–2	2–1	2–2	1–2	1–2	1–2	1–2	0–3	2–1	2–1	1–2	1–2	2–1	2–1
Detroit	0–3	1–2	1–2	1–2	2–1	1–2	1–2	2–1	3–0	0–3	2–2	1–2	3–0	2–1	1–2
Houston	3–0	3–0	3–0	0–3	3–1	1–2	2–1	1–2	2–1	1–2	2–1	2–1	1–2	2–1	2–1
Kansas City	1–2	0–3	1–2	0–3	1–2	2–1	0–3	0–3	3–0	1–2	0–3	2–1	2–1	2–2	1–2
Los Angeles	1–2	1–2	3–0	0–3	1–2	0–4	0–3	1–2	2–1	1–2	2–1	0–3	2–1	3–0	2–1
Minnesota	3–0	0–3	2–1	2–1	2–1	1–2	1–2	2–2	2–1	2–1	2–1	2–1	1–2	2–1	1–2
New York	2–1	0–3	1–2	3–0	1–2	2–1	1–2	1–2	2–2	2–1	2–1	2–1	2–1	1–2	1–2
Oakland	1–2	2–1	0–3	1–2	2–1	0–3	0–3	3–0	0–3	0–3	2–1	0–3	2–2	1–2	0–3
Seattle	2–1	1–2	1–2	1–2	3–0	0–3	2–1	0–3	1–2	1–2	2–1	3–1	2–1	2–1	1–2
Tampa Bay	2–1	1–2	1–2	2–1	3–0	2–1	3–1	2–1	1–2	0–3	3–0	1–2	2–1	1–2	3–0
Texas	1–3	1–2	1–2	0–3	3–0	1–2	3–0	0–3	2–1	3–0	2–1	0–3	2–1	2–1	1–2
Toronto	3–0	3–0	1–2	2–1	2–1	2–1	2–1	2–1	3–0	1–3	3–0	1–2	2–1	1–2	2–1

Updated with the results of all games through October 1, 2023.

== Roster ==
2023 Los Angeles Angels
Roster
Pitchers: 31 Tyler Anderson; 40 Sam Bachman; 51 Jaime Barría; 71 Kelvin Cáceres; 47 Griffin Canning; 58 Davis Daniel; 32 Tucker Davidson; 48 Reid Detmers; 49 Chris Devenski; 74 Jhonathan Díaz; 53 Carlos Estévez; 41 Carson Fulmer; 24 Lucas Giolito; 46 Jimmy Herget; 66 Kolton Ingram; 44 Ben Joyce; 52 Dominic Leone; 41 Reynaldo López; 28 Aaron Loup; 68 José Marte; 58 Víctor Mederos; 55 Matt Moore; 52 Reyes Moronta; 17 Shohei Ohtani; 65 José Quijada; 99 Gerardo Reyes; 78 Kenny Rosenberg; 43 Patrick Sandoval; 63 Chase Silseth; 59 José Soriano; 54 José Suárez; 52 Ryan Tepera; 60 Andrew Wantz; 61 Austin Warren; 71 Jacob Webb; 57 Zack Weiss	Catchers: 14 Logan O'Hoppe; 39 Chris Okey; 21 Matt Thaiss; 35 Chad Wallach; Infielders: 25 C. J. Cron; 23 Brandon Drury; 5 Eduardo Escobar; 22 David Fletcher; 18 Jake Lamb; 8 Mike Moustakas; 9 Zach Neto; 37 Kevin Padlo; 19 Kyren Paris; 6 Anthony Rendon; 2 Luis Rengifo; 18 Nolan Schanuel; 13 Liván Soto; 38 Michael Stefanic; 10 Gio Urshela; 4 Andrew Velazquez; 20 Jared Walsh	Outfielders: 39 Jordyn Adams; 7 Jo Adell; 25,75 Trey Cabbage; 15 Randal Grichuk; 16 Mickey Moniak; 4,8 Brett Phillips; 12 Hunter Renfroe; 27 Mike Trout; 3 Taylor Ward	Manager: 88 Phil Nevin; Coaches: 91 Mike Ashman (batting practice pitcher); 93 Jason Brown (staff assistant); 90 Tim Buss (quality assurance); 95 Drew Butera (bullpen catcher); 89 Benji Gil (field coordinator); 82 Bill Haselman (third base/catching); 84 Bill Hezel (assistant pitching/bullpen); 80 Damon Mashore (first base); 94 Ali Modami (staff assistant); 81 Ray Montgomery (bench); 86 Phil Plantier (assistant hitting); 85 Marcus Thames (hitting); 83 Matt Wise (pitching)

== Player statistics ==
= Indicates team leader

= Indicates league leader

=== Batting ===
Note: G = Games played; AB = At bats; R = Runs; H = Hits; 2B = Doubles; 3B = Triples; HR = Home runs; RBI = Runs batted in; SB = Stolen bases; BB = Walks; AVG = Batting average; SLG = Slugging average

Player	G	AB	R	H	2B	3B	HR	RBI	SB	BB	AVG	SLG
Shohei Ohtani	135	497	102	151	26	8	44	95	20	91	.304	.654
Brandon Drury	125	485	61	127	30	3	26	83	0	25	.262	.497
Hunter Renfroe	126	459	56	111	31	0	19	56	0	39	.242	.434
Luis Rengifo	126	394	55	104	15	4	16	51	6	41	.264	.444
Taylor Ward	97	356	60	90	18	0	14	47	4	39	.253	.421
Mickey Moniak	85	311	35	87	21	2	14	45	6	9	.280	.495
Mike Trout	82	308	54	81	14	1	18	44	2	45	.263	.490
Zach Neto	84	289	38	65	17	0	9	34	5	20	.225	.377
Matt Thaiss	95	262	32	56	6	0	9	31	2	36	.214	.340
Mike Moustakas	65	237	22	56	8	0	8	31	0	6	.236	.371
Gio Urshela	62	214	22	64	8	1	2	24	3	10	.299	.374
Randal Grichuk	54	194	25	42	12	1	8	17	0	11	.216	.412
Logan O'Hoppe	51	182	23	43	6	0	14	29	0	14	.236	.500
Eduardo Escobar	59	178	17	39	3	3	2	15	0	10	.219	.303
Chad Wallach	65	157	18	31	5	1	7	15	0	13	.197	.376
Anthony Rendon	43	148	23	35	6	0	2	22	2	25	.236	.318
Nolan Schanuel	29	109	19	30	3	0	1	6	0	20	.275	.330
Jared Walsh	39	104	10	13	4	0	4	11	0	11	.125	.279
David Fletcher	33	89	7	22	1	0	2	12	0	7	.247	.326
Andrew Velazquez	54	81	12	14	3	0	2	3	13	10	.173	.284
Brett Phillips	39	63	9	11	1	0	3	6	3	8	.175	.333
Michael Stefanic	25	62	5	18	2	1	0	6	0	8	.290	.355
Jo Adell	17	58	7	12	3	1	3	6	1	4	.207	.448
Trey Cabbage	22	53	5	11	3	0	1	7	1	2	.208	.321
Jake Lamb	18	51	7	11	1	0	2	5	0	3	.216	.353
C. J. Cron	15	50	7	10	0	0	1	5	0	4	.200	.260
Kyren Paris	15	40	4	4	0	0	0	1	3	4	.100	.100
Jordyn Adams	17	39	1	5	0	0	0	1	1	0	.128	.128
Liván Soto	4	9	2	2	0	0	0	0	0	3	.222	.222
Kevin Padlo	3	8	1	1	1	0	0	0	0	0	.125	.250
Chris Okey	2	2	0	0	0	0	0	0	0	0	.000	.000
Total	162	5489	739	1346	248	26	231	708	72	518	.245	.426
Rank in AL	—	10	9	8	12	5	3	8	15	7	8	5

Source:Baseball Reference

=== Pitching ===
Note: W = Wins; L = Losses; ERA = Earned run average; G = Games pitched; GS = Games started; SV = Saves; IP = Innings pitched; H = Hits allowed; R = Runs allowed; ER = Earned runs allowed; BB = Walks allowed; SO = Strikeouts

Player	W	L	ERA	G	GS	SV	IP	H	R	ER	BB	SO
Reid Detmers	4	10	4.48	28	28	0	148.2	141	81	74	60	168
Patrick Sandoval	7	13	4.11	28	28	0	144.2	145	89	66	74	128
Tyler Anderson	6	6	5.43	27	25	0	141.0	146	90	85	64	119
Shohei Ohtani	10	5	3.14	23	23	0	132.0	85	50	46	55	167
Griffin Canning	7	8	4.32	24	22	0	127.0	121	62	61	36	139
Jaime Barría	2	6	5.68	34	6	0	82.1	91	63	52	30	62
Carlos Estévez	5	5	3.90	63	0	31	62.1	62	34	27	31	78
Chase Silseth	4	1	3.96	16	8	0	52.1	41	26	23	26	56
Aaron Loup	2	3	6.10	55	0	1	48.2	65	37	33	20	45
Matt Moore	4	1	2.66	41	0	0	44.0	33	14	13	12	49
José Soriano	1	3	3.64	38	0	0	42.0	33	22	17	23	56
Andrew Wantz	2	0	3.89	27	3	0	39.1	28	18	17	15	33
Chris Devenski	3	2	5.08	29	0	0	33.2	31	20	19	9	33
José Suárez	1	3	8.29	11	7	0	33.2	46	32	31	20	28
Kenny Rosenberg	2	2	3.82	7	3	0	33.0	35	14	14	14	29
Lucas Giolito	1	5	6.89	6	6	0	32.2	33	28	25	15	34
Tucker Davidson	1	1	6.54	18	0	2	31.2	44	25	23	11	31
Jacob Webb	1	1	3.98	29	0	1	31.2	23	14	14	20	34
Jimmy Herget	2	4	4.66	29	1	0	29.0	33	15	15	8	26
Sam Bachman	1	2	3.18	11	0	1	17.0	17	7	6	11	14
Dominic Leone	0	0	5.54	11	0	1	13.0	15	8	8	9	11
Reynaldo López	0	2	2.77	13	0	2	13.0	12	4	4	8	19
Davis Daniel	1	1	2.19	3	0	0	12.1	7	3	3	9	9
Carson Fulmer	1	1	2.70	3	1	0	10.0	6	3	3	4	6
Ben Joyce	1	1	5.40	12	0	0	10.0	9	6	6	9	10
Gerardo Reyes	0	0	7.45	8	0	0	9.2	11	9	8	6	10
José Marte	0	0	8.68	10	0	0	9.1	14	10	9	7	7
José Quijada	0	1	6.00	10	0	0	9.0	8	7	6	3	8
Ryan Tepera	2	2	7.27	10	0	0	8.2	15	9	7	3	10
Jhonathan Díaz	0	0	10.29	4	1	0	7.0	13	11	8	7	4
Kolton Ingram	0	0	8.44	5	0	0	5.1	8	7	5	5	7
Zack Weiss	1	0	5.06	6	0	0	5.1	6	3	3	2	7
Eduardo Escobar	0	0	2.45	3	0	0	3.2	2	2	1	1	0
Victor Mederos	0	0	9.00	3	0	0	3.0	5	3	3	3	3
Austin Warren	1	0	5.40	2	0	0	1.2	2	1	1	0	2
Reyes Moronta	0	0	6.75	2	0	0	1.1	4	1	1	3	2
Kelvin Cáceres	0	0	6.75	2	0	0	1.1	2	1	1	2	1
Jake Lamb	0	0	0.00	1	0	0	1.0	1	0	0	0	0
Brett Phillips	0	0	0.00	1	0	0	0.1	1	0	0	1	0
Totals	73	89	4.64	162	162	43	1431.2	1394	829	738	636	1445
Rank in AL	12	4	12	—	—	7	11	12	12	12	13	7

Note: No qualifiers for ERA leaders (minimum 162 IP).

Source:Baseball Reference

== Major League Baseball draft ==
Below are the Angels' picks from 2023 Major League Baseball draft. Players who reached MLB are in bold.

Los Angeles Angels 2023 Draft Picks

Round	Pick	Name	Age	Position	School	Signing bonus
1	11	**Nolan Schanuel**	21	1B	Florida Atlantic University	$5,253,000
2	Forfeited for signing Tyler Anderson					
3	79	Alberto Rios	21	3B/C	Stanford University	$847,500
4	111	Joe Redfield	21	OF	Sam Houston State University	$472,500
5	147	Chris Clark	21	P	Harvard University	$318,825
6	174	Camden Minacci	21	P	Wake Forest University	$328,500
7	204	Cole Fontenelle	21	3B	Texas Christian University	$256,400
8	234	Barrett Kent	18	P	Pottsboro High School (TX)	$997,500
9	264	Chase Gockel	23	P	Quincy University	$1,000
10	294	Chris Barraza	23	P	University of Arizona	$7,500
11	324	John Wimmer	18	SS	Rock Hill High School (SC)	$397,500
12	354	Sam Brown	21	1B	Washington State University	$150,000
13	384	Riley Bauman	20	P	Abilene Christian University	$135,000
14	414	Zach Joyce	22	P	University of Tennessee	$150,000
15	444	Caleb Ketchup	21	SS	Lipscomb University	$150,000
16	474	Rio Foster	20	OF	Florence–Darlington Technical College	$100,000
17	504	Logan Britt	22	P	New Mexico State University	$150,000
18	534	Dalton Kendrick	22	P	Abilene Christian University	$125,000
19	564	Raudi Rodriguez	20	OF	Georgia Premier Academy (GA)	$100,000
20	594	Mac McCroskey	23	SS	Oral Roberts University	$75,000

== Farm system ==
Level	Team	League	Manager
AAA	Salt Lake Bees	Pacific Coast League	Keith Johnson
AA	Rocket City Trash Pandas	Southern League	Andy Schatzley
A	Tri-City Dust Devils	Northwest League	Gustavo Campero'
A-Advanced	Inland Empire 66ers	California League	Dave Stapleton
Rookie	ACL Angels	Arizona Complex League	
Rookie	DSL Angels	Dominican Summer League	

All coaches and rosters can be found on each team's website.

== See also ==
- Los Angeles Angels
- Angel Stadium

Records
Preceded by 2022	Los Angeles Angels seasons 2023	Succeeded by 2024
