= Luella High School =

Public high school in Locust Grove, Georgia, United States

Location
- 603 Walker Drive; Locust Grove, Georgia 30248; United States
- 33°22′41″N 84°11′59″W

Information
- Type: Public, coeducational
- Established: 2003
- Superintendent: Mary Elizabeth Davis
- Principal: Brandi Hardnett
- Staff: 67.30 (FTE)
- Enrollment: 1,236 (2024–2025)
- Student to teacher ratio: 18.31
- Campus: Urban
- Colors: Blue, silver and maroon
- Nickname: Lions
- Website: Luella High School

Luella High School is a public institution within the Henry County School System in Locust Grove, Georgia, United States. It hosts students from ninth through twelfth grades. Current enrollment is around 1,400 students. Luella High School shares facilities with Luella Elementary School and Luella Middle School.

== Athletics ==
- Baseball
- Basketball
- Cheerleading
- Cross country
- Football
- Golf
- Rifle Team
- Soccer
- Softball
- Tennis
- Track
- Volleyball
- Wrestling

== Notable alumni ==
- Kolton Ingram, baseball player
