= Kelvin Cáceres =

Dominican baseball player (born 2000)

Sioux City Explorers – No. 5
- Pitcher
- Born: January 26, 2000 (age 26); Santiago, Dominican Republic
- Bats: Right Throws: Right

MLB debut
- September 27, 2023, for the Los Angeles Angels

MLB statistics (through 2023 season)
- Win–loss record: 0–0
- Earned run average: 6.75
- Strikeouts: 1
- Stats at Baseball Reference

Teams
- Los Angeles Angels (2023)

Kelvin José Cáceres (born January 26, 2000) is a Dominican professional baseball pitcher for the Sioux City Explorers of the American Association of Professional Baseball. He pitched two Major League Baseball (MLB) games for the Los Angeles Angels in 2023.

== Career ==
=== Los Angeles Angels ===
Cáceres signed with the Los Angeles Angels as an international free agent on May 15, 2018. He spent his first two professional seasons with rookie-level affiliates, the Dominican Summer League Angels and Arizona League Angels, logging a 4.98 ERA and 3.82 ERA, respectively. Cáceres did not play in a game in 2020 due to the cancellation of the minor league season because of the COVID-19 pandemic.

Cáceres returned to action in 2021, splitting the year between the Arizona Complex League Angels and Single-A Inland Empire 66ers. In 16 combined appearances, he struggled to an 0–6 record and 6.19 ERA with 65 strikeouts across 48 innings pitched. He spent the 2022 season back with Inland Empire, appearing in 36 contests and pitching to a 3.84 ERA with 117 strikeouts across 77 1/3 innings of work.

Cáceres split the 2023 season between the High-A Tri-City Dust Devils, Double-A Rocket City Trash Pandas, and Triple-A Salt Lake Bees. In 52 total games, he recorded a 4.12 ERA with 85 strikeouts and 8 saves across 54 2/3 innings pitched. On September 27, Cáceres was selected to the 40-man roster and promoted to the major leagues for the first time. He pitched in two game, allowing one run in 1 1/3 innings.

Cáceres was optioned to Triple-A to begin the 2024 season. However, he suffered a right lat injury before making an appearance and was later placed on the 60-day injured list on May 9.

Cáceres was designated for assignment by the Angels on February 11, 2025. He cleared waivers and was sent outright to Salt Lake on February 17. He made 30 appearances for Double-A Rocket City during the regular season, compiling an 0–4 record and 5.50 ERA with 42 strikeouts over 36 innings of work. He elected free agency following the season on November 6.

=== Sioux City Explorers ===
On May 1, 2026, Cáceres signed with the Sioux City Explorers of the American Association of Professional Baseball.
