= Kenny Rosenberg =

American baseball player (born 1995)

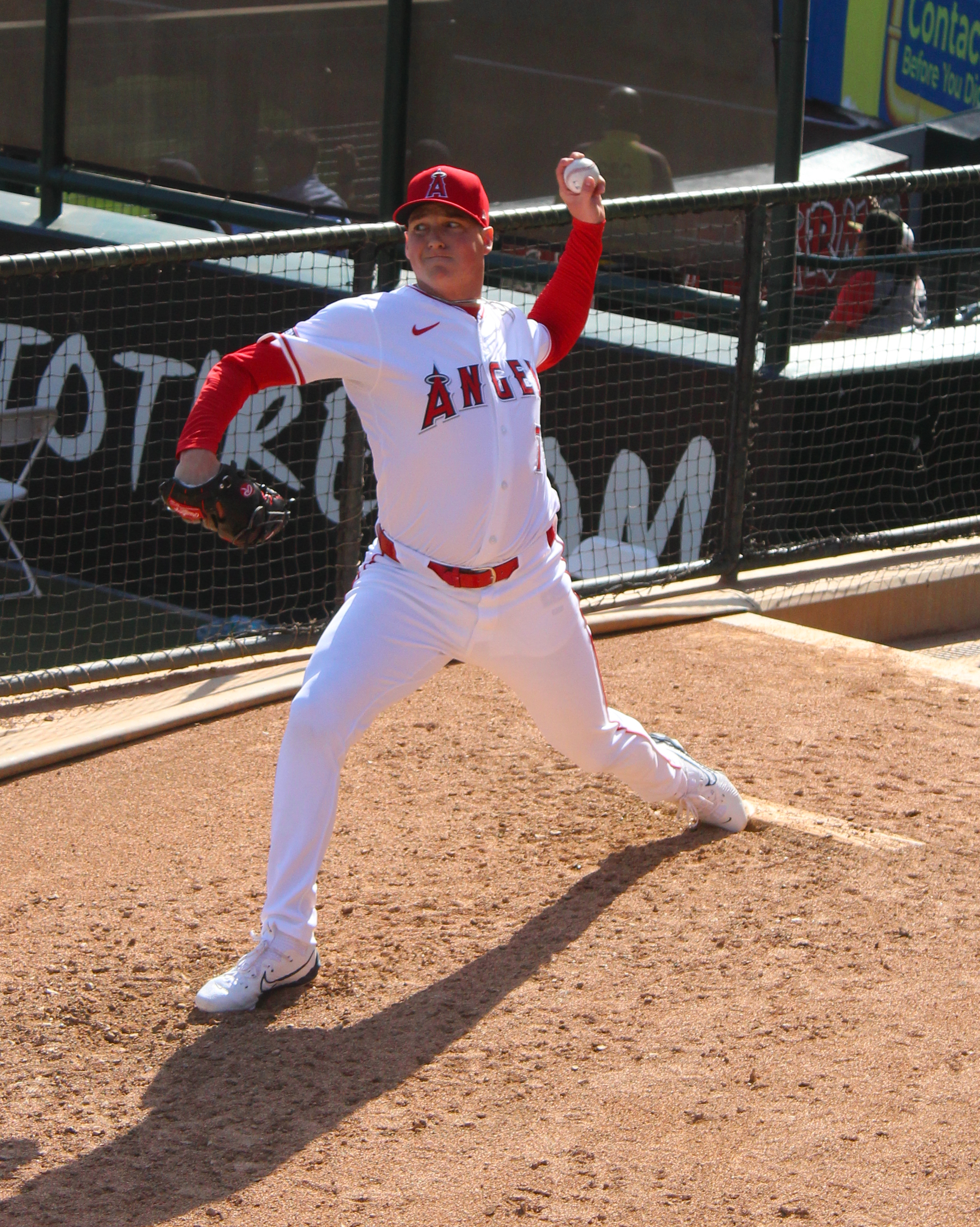
- Rosenberg with the Angels in 2024

Free agent
- Pitcher
- Born: July 9, 1995 (age 31); Mill Valley, California, U.S.
- Bats: Left Throws: Left

Professional debut
- MLB: April 18, 2022, for the Los Angeles Angels
- KBO: March 22, 2025, for the Kiwoom Heroes

MLB statistics (through 2024 season)
- Win–loss record: 2–3
- Earned run average: 4.66
- Strikeouts: 54

KBO statistics (through 2026 season)
- Win–loss record: 4–6
- Earned run average: 3.67
- Strikeouts: 112
- Stats at Baseball Reference

Teams
- Los Angeles Angels (2022–2024); Kiwoom Heroes (2025–2026)

Kenneth Walter Rosenberg (born July 9, 1995) is an American professional baseball pitcher who is a free agent. He has previously played in Major League Baseball (MLB) for the Los Angeles Angels and in the KBO League for the Kiwoom Heroes. He played college baseball at California State University, Northridge, and was drafted by the Tampa Bay Rays in the 8th round of the 2016 MLB draft. He made his MLB debut with the Angels in 2022.

== Amateur career ==
Rosenberg was born in Mill Valley, California, a small town north of San Francisco, later lived in Santa Clarita, California, and is Jewish. He attended Tamalpais High School, where he was an All-MCAL First Team pitcher and first baseman in baseball in 2013, as well as an All-League goalkeeper in soccer. As a senior, on the mound Rosenberg had 75 strikeouts in 49 innings, with two shutouts.

He then attended California State University, Northridge, majoring in journalism. In his sophomore season in 2016, he posted a 6–1 record with a 3.21 earned run average (ERA) and led the Big West Conference with 118 strikeouts (in 109 innings), ahead of eventual Cy Young Award winner Shane Bieber, as he held batters to a .198 batting average. He was named Big West Conference All-Academic Team.

== Professional career ==
=== Tampa Bay Rays ===
Rosenberg was drafted by the Tampa Bay Rays in the 8th round of the 2016 Major League Baseball draft. In 2016, between the rookie-level Gulf Coast League Rays and Princeton Rays, he went 1–2 with a 2.54 ERA, with 33 strikeouts in 28 1/3 innings.

In 2017, Rosenberg pitched for the Single–A Bowling Green Hot Rods. He went 7-7 with one save and a 4.28 ERA, and his 133 strikeouts ranked third in the Midwest League and fourth in the Rays organization, as he had 10.5 strikeouts per 9 innings.

In 2018, Rosenberg pitched for the Charlotte Stone Crabs of the Single–A Florida State League. He went 11-2 with a 4.86 ERA, as his 11 wins ranked third in the league, his 106 strikeouts were sixth, and his .846 winning percentage was eighth.

In 2019, Rosenberg pitched primarily for the Double-A Montgomery Biscuits, also pitching in one game for the Triple-A Durham Bulls. He went 11-4 with a 3.29 ERA in 25 games (16 starts) for Montgomery, and was named a midseason Southern League All Star. He tied for the league lead in wins, ranked fourth in ERA, and ninth in strikeouts with 108. His aggregate 114 strikeouts were third among Rays minor leaguers. Rosenberg did not play in a game in 2020 due to the cancellation of the minor league season because of the COVID-19 pandemic.

The Rays invited Rosenberg to spring training in 2021. He split the 2021 season between the FCL Rays, Montgomery, and Durham, going a combined 4-1 with a 2.81 ERA and 59 strikeouts over 41 2/3 innings (12.7 strikeouts per 9 innings).

=== Los Angeles Angels ===
==== 2022 ====
On December 8, 2021, Rosenberg was selected by the Los Angeles Angels with the 8th pick in the minor league phase of the 2021 Rule 5 draft.

Rosenberg opened the 2022 season with the Salt Lake Bees. On April 18, 2022, the Angels selected his contract and promoted him to the major leagues for the first time. He made his MLB debut that day, surrendering a run in relief against the Houston Astros while striking out two. The following day, the Angels optioned Rosenberg back to Salt Lake. Rosenberg was recalled by the Angels on May 31 and made his second career major league appearance that day, throwing 99 pitches in 5 innings of relief against the New York Yankees. On June 19, Rosenberg made his first career start, pitching 4 2/3 scoreless innings against the Seattle Mariners. In 2022 with the Salt Lake Bees, he was 2-5 with a 3.16 ERA (tied for 9th in the PCL) in 14 games (13 starts) covering 62 2/3 innings in which he struck out 60 batters.

On December 12, 2022, Rosenberg was designated for assignment following the signing of Justin Garza. He cleared waivers and was sent outright to Salt Lake on December 19.

==== 2023 ====
In 20 starts for Triple–A Salt Lake in 2023, he posted a 7–7 record and 4.95 ERA with 120 strikeouts (6th in the Pacific Coast League) in 100 innings of work (10.8 strikeouts per 9 innings; leading all pitchers who pitched 80 or more innings). On August 5, 2023, the Angels selected Rosenberg's contract, adding him to the major league roster.

With the Angels in 2023, Rosenberg was 2-2 with a 3.82 ERA, as in 33 innings he struck out 29 batters. He mostly threw a 91 mph four-seam fastball and an 82 mph change-up, along with an 83 mph slider and a 77 mph curveball.

==== 2024 ====
Rosenberg was optioned to Triple–A Salt Lake to begin the 2024 season. With Salt Lake, he was 9-7 with a 4.21 ERA in 21 starts (one complete game; tying for league lead) covering 115 1/3 innings. His nine wins tied for fourth in the league. With the Angels he was 0-1 with a 6.00 ERA in seven games (one start) in which he pitched 24 innings. He was released on November 4, 2024.

=== Kiwoom Heroes ===
On November 25, 2024, Rosenberg signed an $800,000 contract with the Kiwoom Heroes of the KBO League. He made 13 starts for Kiwoom, logging a 4-4 record and 3.23 ERA with 80 strikeouts across 75 1/3 innings pitched. Rosenberg was replaced by Lachlan Wells in June after suffering a hip injury. He was later ruled out for the season, and was subsequently released by the team after C. C. Mercedes was signed on July 30, 2025.

On April 21, 2026, Rosenberg re-signed with the Heroes on a six-week, $50,000 contract as an injury replacement for Nathan Wiles. He signed a new six-week, $50,000 contract with the team on May 28. He became a free agent following his last appearance on June 20.

== See also ==
- List of Jewish Major League Baseball players
- Rule 5 draft results
