= Braxton Garrett =

American baseball player (born 1997)

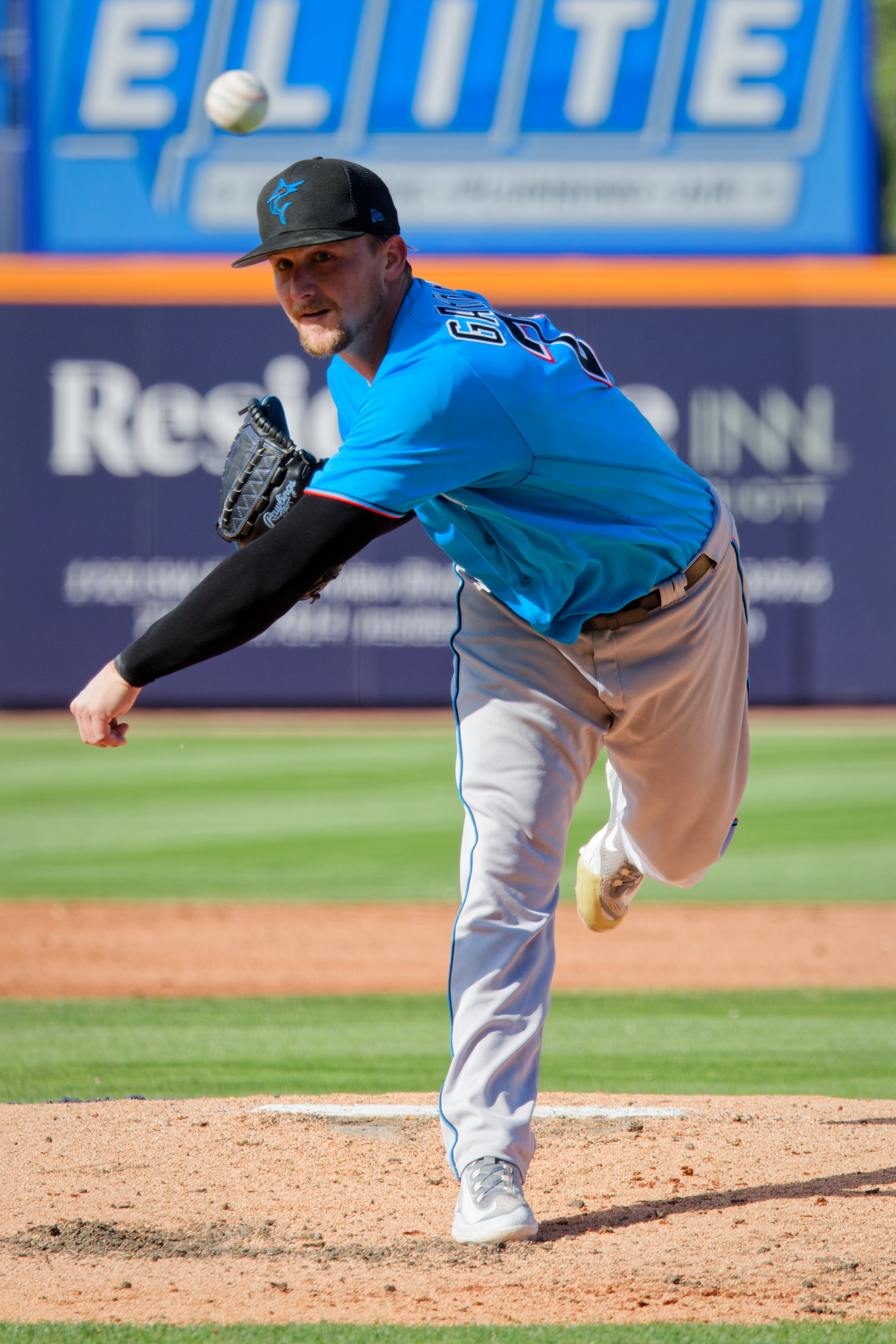
- Garrett with the Marlins in 2023

Chicago Cubs – No. 60
- Pitcher
- Born: August 5, 1997 (age 29); Troy, Alabama, U.S.
- Bats: Left Throws: Left

MLB debut
- September 13, 2020, for the Miami Marlins

MLB statistics (through 2026 season)
- Win–loss record: 17–20
- Earned run average: 4.13
- Strikeouts: 327
- Stats at Baseball Reference

Teams
- Miami Marlins (2020–2024, 2026); Chicago Cubs (2026–present)
Medals
Men's baseball
Representing United States
U-18 Baseball World Cup
Gold medal – first place	2015 Osaka	Team

Braxton Lee Garrett (born August 5, 1997) is an American professional baseball pitcher for the Chicago Cubs of Major League Baseball (MLB). The Miami Marlins selected him with the seventh overall selection of the 2016 MLB draft, and he made his MLB debut with them in 2020.

== Amateur career ==
Garrett attended Foley High School in Foley, Alabama his freshman and sophomore years. Prior to his junior year he transferred to Florence High School in Florence, Alabama. As a sophomore at Foley in 2014, he was 8–2 with a 1.23 earned run average (ERA) with 108 strikeouts in 57 innings. In July of that year he committed to Vanderbilt University to play college baseball. As a junior at Florence in 2015, Garrett was 7–1 with a 0.75 ERA with 141 strikeouts in 66 2/3 innings. In August after that season, he played in the Perfect Game All-American Classic at Petco Park. Later that year, he played for the 18U National Team that won the World Cup.

== Professional career ==
=== Miami Marlins ===
Garrett was considered one of the top prospects for the 2016 Major League Baseball draft. He was selected seventh overall in the draft by the Miami Marlins. He agreed to sign with the Marlins for a $4,145,900 signing bonus. He made his professional debut in 2017 with the Greensboro Grasshoppers of the Single-A South Atlantic League, where he posted a 1–0 record with a 2.93 ERA in four starts before he underwent Tommy John surgery in June, ending his season.

MLB.com ranked Garrett as Miami's fifth best prospect going into the 2018 season. However, he also missed all of that season, as he was recovering from the surgery he had undergone the previous year. Garrett returned in 2019, beginning the year with the Jupiter Hammerheads of the High-A Florida State League, and also pitched in one game for the Jacksonville Jumbo Shrimp of the Double-A Southern League. Over 21 starts between the two clubs, he went 6–7 with a 3.54 ERA.

On September 13, 2020, the Marlins selected Garrett's contract and he made his major league debut that day in the second game of a doubleheader. In two starts in his rookie campaign, he surrendered six runs (five earned) on eight hits and five walks with eight strikeouts in 7 2/3 innings.

For the 2021 season, Garrett spent the majority of the season with Triple-A Jacksonville, making 17 starts and logging a 5–4 record and 3.89 ERA with 86 strikeouts in 85 2/3 innings. In eight contests (seven starts) for the Marlins, he recorded a 5.03 ERA with 32 strikeouts in 34 innings pitched. In 2022, Garrett spent time up and down between Miami and Triple-A Jacksonville. In 17 turns out of Miami's rotation, Garrett registered a 3–7 record and 3.58 ERA with 90 strikeouts in 88 innings pitched.

Garrett began the 2023 season as a long reliever but joined the Marlins starting rotation in April after Johnny Cueto injured his right biceps. Garrett started 30 games for the Marlins, pitching to a 3.66 ERA in 159 2/3 innings while striking out 156. He started Game 2 of the 2023 National League Wild Card Series, which the Marlins lost.

On May 24, 2024, Garrett threw a complete–game shutout against the Arizona Diamondbacks. He completed the shutout in 95 pitches, a feat known as a Maddux. He was placed on the injured list with a left forearm flexor strain on June 23, and was transferred to the 60-day injured list on July 30. Garrett did not return in 2024, and finished the year with a 2–2 record and 5.35 ERA with 34 strikeouts over 7 starts.

On January 8, 2025, it was announced that Garrett would miss the entirety of the 2025 season after undergoing a revision surgery on his left ulnar collateral ligament.

Garrett was optioned to Triple-A Jacksonville to begin the 2026 season, after Janson Junk was named as the team's fifth starter. On April 21, Garrett pitched a complete game of eight innings at the Gwinnett Stripers without allowing a hit, but the Stripers scored two runs on two hit by pitches, a wild pitch, an error by Garrett, and a sacrifice fly, winning the game, 2–0. Because the Stripers did not play the bottom of the ninth inning due to having a lead at home after the top of the ninth, Garrett pitched only eight innings, and the game does not count as a no-hitter by MLB's definition. Garrett made two appearances for the Marlins, struggling to an 0–1 record and 14.54 ERA with five strikeouts across 4 1/3 innings pitched.

=== Chicago Cubs ===
On August 3, 2026, the Marlins traded Garrett to the Chicago Cubs in exchange for Jonathon Long and Jace Beck.
