= Kolton Ingram =

American baseball player (born 1996)

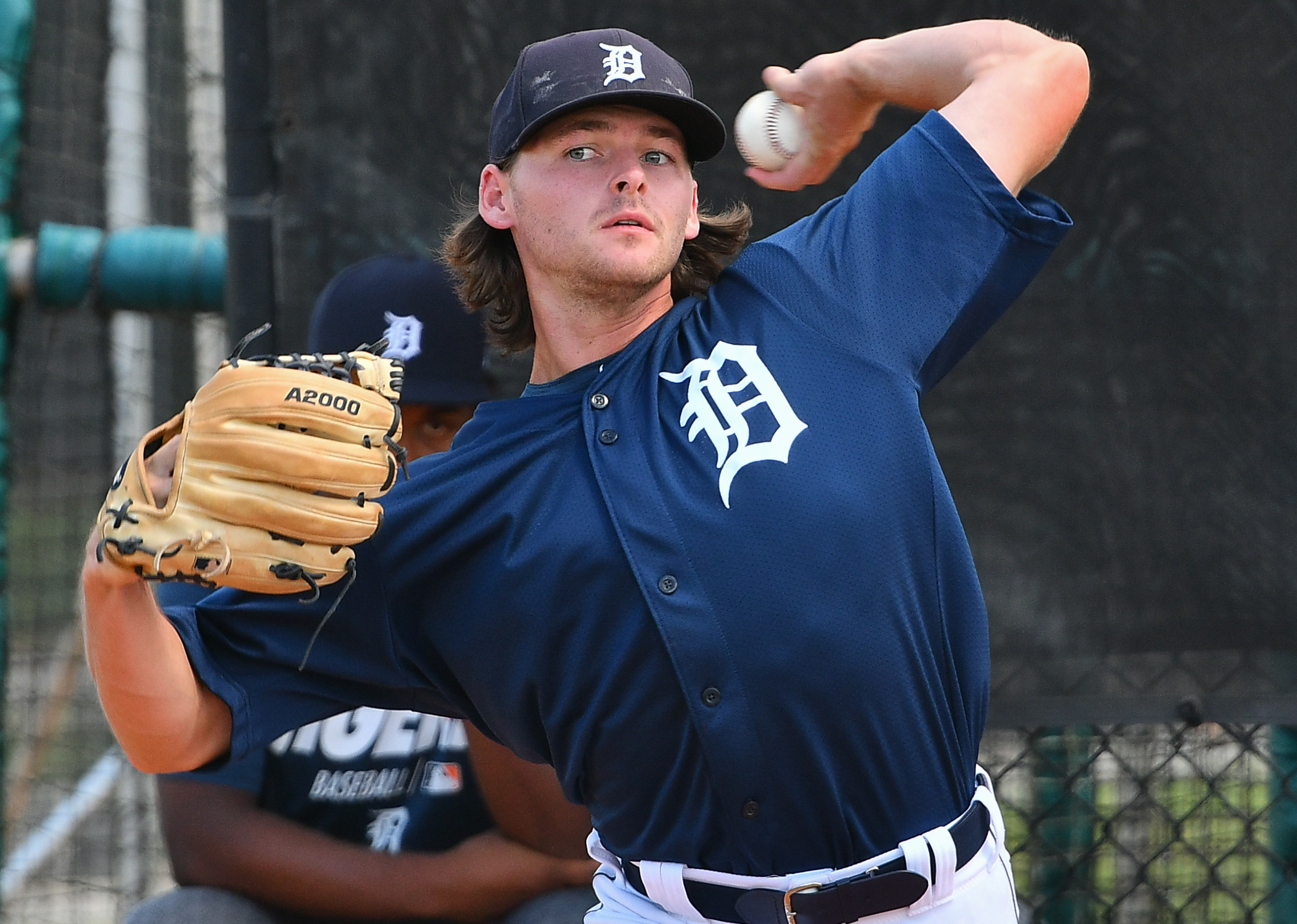
- Ingram with the Detroit Tigers in 2019

Free agent
- Pitcher
- Born: October 21, 1996 (age 29); Stockbridge, Georgia, U.S.
- Bats: Left Throws: Left

MLB debut
- June 17, 2023, for the Los Angeles Angels

MLB statistics (through 2023 season)
- Win–loss record: 0–0
- Earned run average: 8.44
- Strikeouts: 7
- Stats at Baseball Reference

Teams
- Los Angeles Angels (2023)

Kolton Reed Ingram (born October 21, 1996) is an American professional baseball pitcher who is a free agent. He has previously played in Major League Baseball (MLB) for the Los Angeles Angels.

== Career ==
=== Amateur career ===
Ingram attended Luella High School in Locust Grove, Georgia. He attended Columbus State University and played college baseball for the Columbus State Cougars.

=== Detroit Tigers ===
The Detroit Tigers selected Ingram in the 37th round, with the 1,102nd overall selection, of the 2019 Major League Baseball draft. He made his professional debut with the rookie–level Gulf Coast League Tigers. In 15 contests, he registered a 4.15 ERA with 28 strikeouts in 30 1/3 innings pitched. Ingram did not play in a game in 2020 due to the cancellation of the minor league season because of the COVID-19 pandemic. On July 3, 2020, Ingram was released by the Tigers.

=== Los Angeles Angels ===
On January 29, 2021, Ingram signed with the Sioux Falls Canaries of the American Association of Professional Baseball. Prior to the American Association season, on March 29, Ingram signed a minor league contract with the Los Angeles Angels organization. He split the 2021 season between the Single–A Inland Empire 66ers, High–A Tri-City Dust Devils, and Double–A Rocket City Trash Pandas. In 36 cumulative appearances, he posted a 3.47 ERA with 67 strikeouts and 10 saves in 46 2/3 innings of work. Ingram spent the 2022 season with Double–A Rocket City, appearing in 50 games and posting a 6–2 record and 2.67 ERA with 73 strikeouts and 10 saves in 60 2/3 innings pitched. On November 15, 2022, the Angels added Ingram to their 40-man roster to protect him from the Rule 5 draft.

Ingram was optioned to the Triple-A Salt Lake Bees to start the 2023 season. He was later reassigned to the Double–A Rocket City Trash Pandas, and posted a 2.63 ERA with 38 strikeouts and 2 saves in 27 1/3 innings of work across 23 appearances.

On June 15, 2023, Ingram was promoted to the major leagues for the first time, and made his debut two days later against the Kansas City Royals. Ingram entered the game in the seventh inning, with the Angels leading the Royals 8-2. Ingram got his first batter to fly out, but would then give up 2 hits and 2 walks before being replaced by Jacob Webb who gave up a double, allowing 2 more runners to score that were charged to Ingram. This began a comeback by the Royals, who would eventually win by a score of 10-9. In five games, Ingram pitched to an 8.44 ERA, though he did so with an above average 11.81 K/9. On January 29, 2024, Ingram was designated for assignment by the Angels.

=== New York Mets ===
On February 5, 2024, Ingram returned to the Detroit Tigers organization when they claimed him off waivers from the Angels. However, the Tigers also designated him for assignment, on February 20. The New York Mets claimed him off waivers on February 25. Ingram was optioned to the Triple–A Syracuse Mets to begin the 2024 season. After struggling to a 7.20 ERA across four games, he was designated for assignment on April 20.

=== Texas Rangers ===
On April 24, 2024, Ingram was claimed off waivers by the Texas Rangers. He made two scoreless appearances for the Triple–A Round Rock Express, striking out none and walking one in two innings. On May 8, he was designated for assignment following the acquisition of Robbie Grossman.

=== St. Louis Cardinals ===
On May 10, 2024, Ingram was claimed off waivers by the St. Louis Cardinals. In 14 games for the Triple–A Memphis Redbirds, he logged a 3.93 ERA with 23 strikeouts and 3 saves. Ingram was designated for assignment following the promotion of Jacob Bosiokovic on June 30.

=== San Francisco Giants ===
On July 2, 2024, Ingram was claimed off waivers by the San Francisco Giants. On July 17, Ingram was removed from the 40–man roster and sent outright to the Triple–A Sacramento River Cats. In 25 appearances for Sacramento, he posted a 4–2 record and 3.08 ERA with 26 strikeouts and 3 saves across 26 1/3 innings pitched. Ingram elected free agency following the season on November 4.

=== Atlanta Braves ===
On November 19, 2024, Ingram signed a minor league contract with the Atlanta Braves. He made 10 appearances split between the Double-A Columbus Clingstones and Triple-A Gwinnett Stripers, recording a cumulative 5.68 ERA with 13 strikeouts across 12 2/3 innings pitched. Ingram was released by the Braves organization on July 18, 2025.
