= Edward Cabrera =

Dominican baseball player (born 1998)

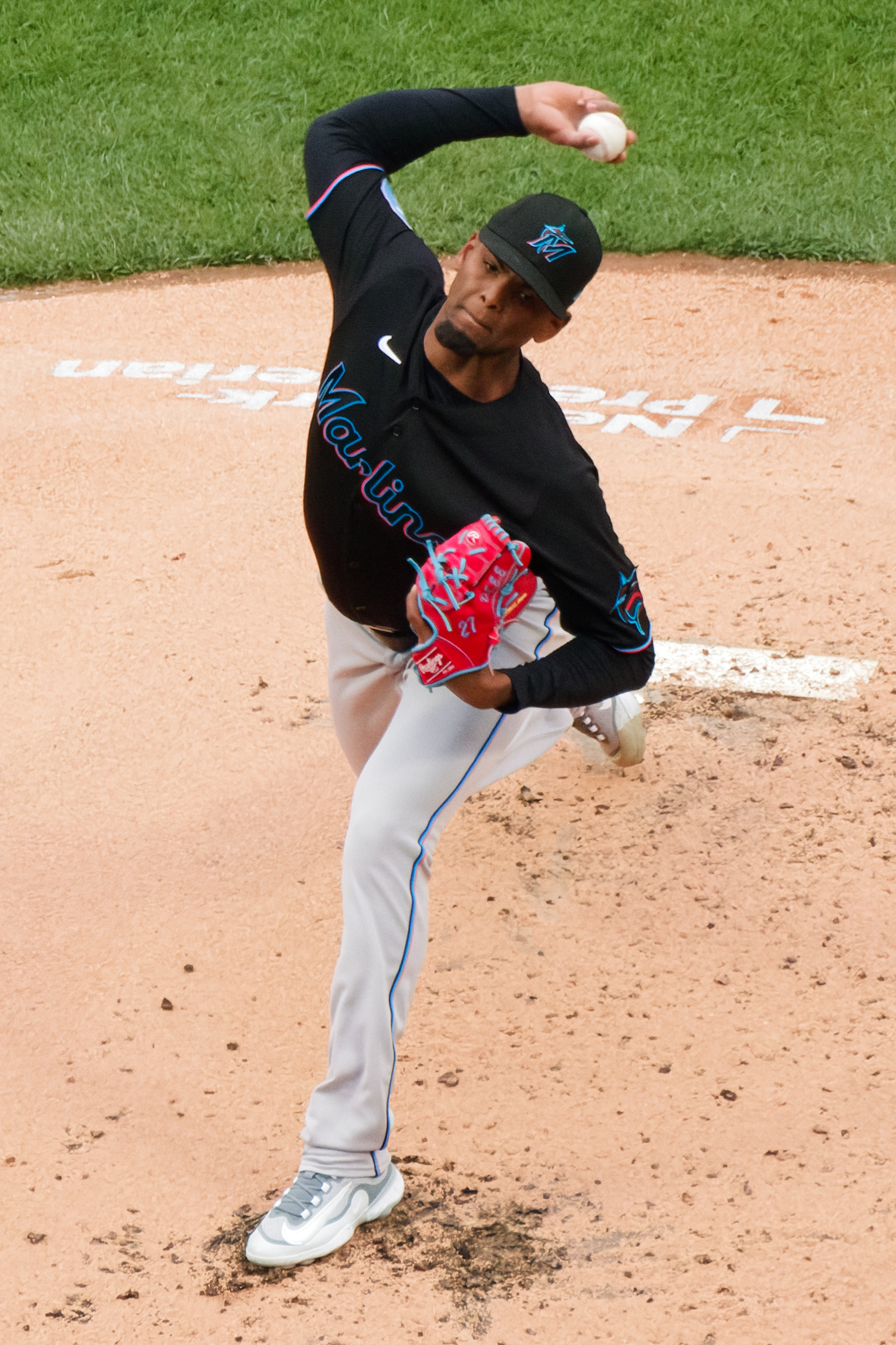
- Cabrera with the Marlins in 2023

Chicago Cubs – No. 30
- Pitcher
- Born: April 13, 1998 (age 28); Santiago, Dominican Republic
- Bats: Right Throws: Right

MLB debut
- August 25, 2021, for the Miami Marlins

MLB statistics (through 2026 season)
- Win–loss record: 30–34
- Earned run average: 4.36
- Strikeouts: 549
- Stats at Baseball Reference

Teams
- Miami Marlins (2021–2025); Chicago Cubs (2026–present)

Edward Brany Cabrera (born April 13, 1998) is a Dominican professional baseball pitcher for the Chicago Cubs of Major League Baseball (MLB). He has previously played in MLB for the Miami Marlins. He signed with the Marlins as an international free agent in 2015, and made his MLB debut in 2021.

== Career ==
=== Miami Marlins ===
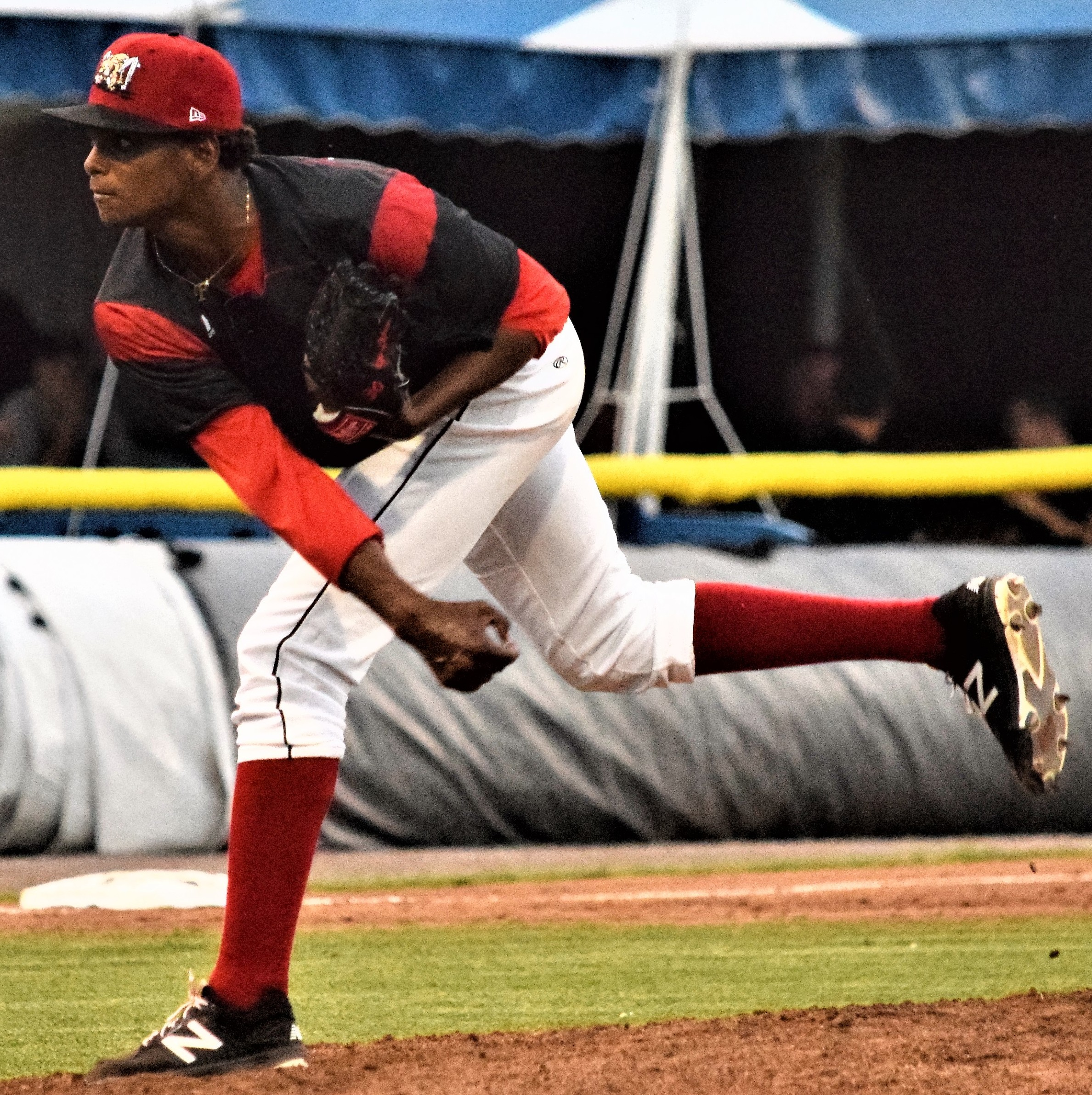
Cabrera with the Batavia Muckdogs in 2017

Cabrera signed with the Miami Marlins as an international free agent on July 2, 2015. He made his professional debut in 2016 with the Gulf Coast Marlins, going 2–6 with a 4.21 ERA over 47 innings. He played 2017 with the Batavia Muckdogs, pitching to a 1–3 record and a 5.30 ERA over 13 games (six starts), and 2018 with the Greensboro Grasshoppers, compiling a 4–8 record with a 4.22 ERA over 22 starts.

Cabrera started 2019 with the Jupiter Hammerheads, earning Florida State League All-Star honors, before being promoted to the Jacksonville Jumbo Shrimp. Over 19 starts between both clubs, Cabrera went 9–4 with a 2.23 ERA, striking out 116 over 96 2/3 innings. Cabrera was added to the Marlins 40-man roster following the 2019 season.

Cabrera did not play in a game in 2020 due to the cancellation of the minor league season because of the COVID-19 pandemic. On August 21, 2021, Cabrera was promoted to the active roster to make his MLB debut. Cabrera made his MLB debut and earned a no-decision on August 25, pitching 6 1/3 innings and allowing three runs in a 4–3 victory over the Washington Nationals.

On June 1, 2022, Cabrera earned his first career win over the Colorado Rockies. He made 14 starts for Miami during the regular season, posting a 6–4 record and 3.01 ERA with 75 strikeouts across 71 1/3 innings of work.

On August 1, 2023, Cabrera was optioned to the Triple-A Jacksonville Jumbo Shrimp. On September 6, Cabrera returned to pitch for the Marlins. He ended up tying the team record for a relief pitcher pitching strikeouts in a single game, recording eight strikeouts against the Los Angeles Dodgers. In 22 total appearances (including 20 starts) for the Marlins, Cabrera compiled a 7–7 record and 4.24 ERA with 118 strikeouts across 99 2/3 innings pitched.

Cabrera made five starts for Miami to begin the 2024 season, logging a 7.17 ERA and 31 strikeouts. He was placed on the injured list with a right shoulder impingement on May 8, and was transferred to the 60–day injured list on June 23. Cabrera was activated from the injured list on July 7. Across the entirety of the year, Cabrera would make 20 starts for the Marlins, posting a 4.95 ERA with a 4–8 record and 107 strikeouts.

Cabrera made 26 starts for Miami during the 2025 campaign, registering an 8–7 record and 3.53 ERA with 150 strikeouts across 137 2/3 innings pitched.

=== Chicago Cubs ===
On January 7, 2026, the Marlins traded Cabrera to the Chicago Cubs in exchange for Owen Caissie, Cristian Hernández, and Edgardo De Leon.
