= A. J. Puk =

American baseball player (born 1995)

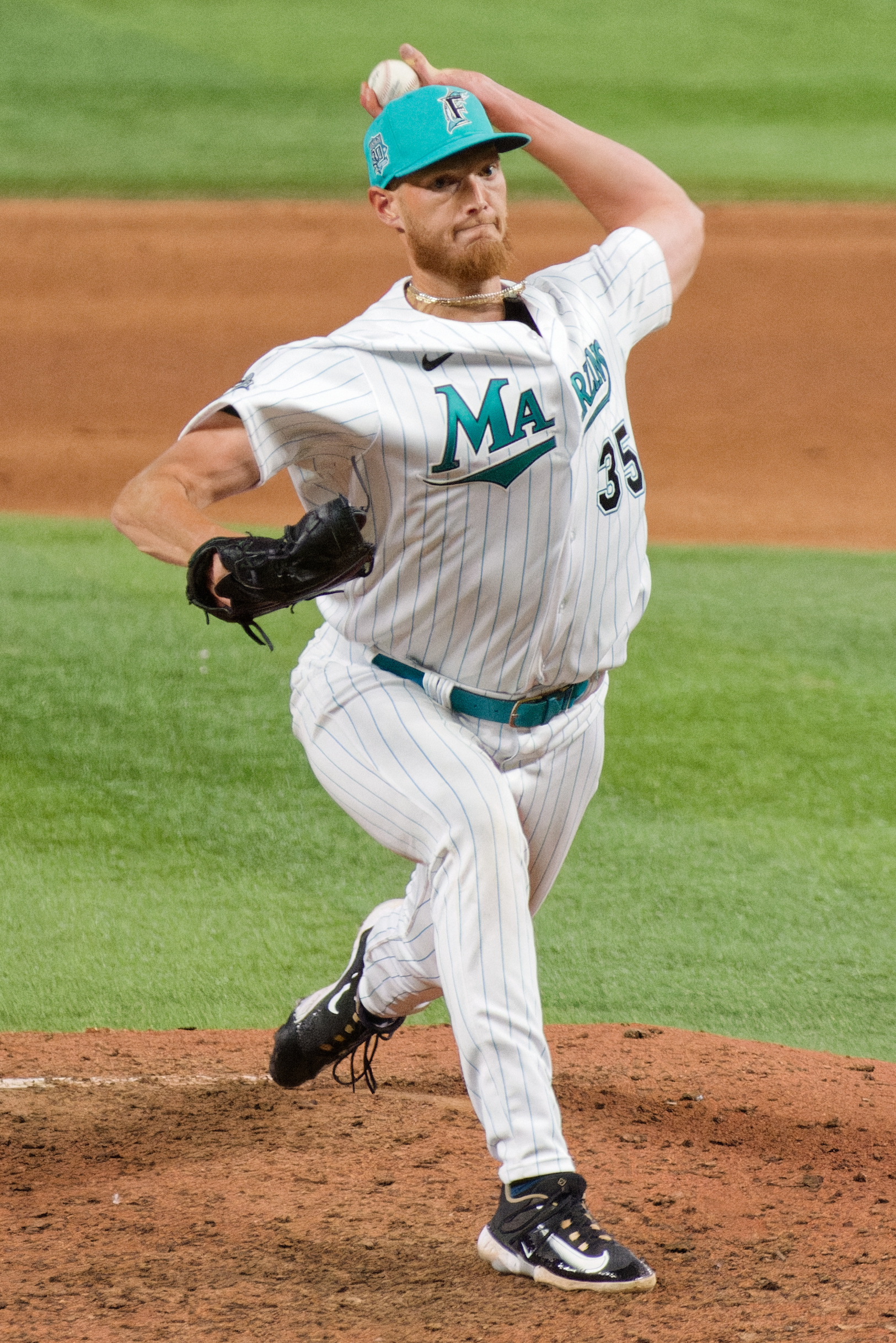
- Puk with the Marlins in 2023

Free agent
- Pitcher
- Born: April 25, 1995 (age 31); Minneapolis, Minnesota, U.S.
- Bats: Left Throws: Left

MLB debut
- August 21, 2019, for the Oakland Athletics

MLB statistics (through 2025 season)
- Win–loss record: 17–20
- Earned run average: 3.53
- Strikeouts: 283
- Saves: 26
- Stats at Baseball Reference

Teams
- Oakland Athletics (2019, 2021–2022); Miami Marlins (2023–2024); Arizona Diamondbacks (2024–2025)

Andrew Jacob Puk (/pək/ PUHK; born April 25, 1995) is an American professional baseball pitcher who is a free agent. He has played in Major League Baseball (MLB) for the Oakland Athletics, Miami Marlins, and Arizona Diamondbacks. Puk played college baseball for the Florida Gators. The Athletics selected him in the first round with the sixth overall pick of the 2016 MLB draft, and he made his MLB debut in 2019.

== Amateur career ==
Puk attended Washington High School in Cedar Rapids, Iowa. He was a first baseman and pitcher in baseball and also played football as a quarterback. He was drafted by the Detroit Tigers in the 35th round of the 2013 Major League Baseball draft, but did not sign and attended the University of Florida to play college baseball.

As a freshman at Florida, Puk appeared in 19 games and made seven starts. He had a 5–2 win–loss record with a 3.35 earned run average (ERA), 44 strikeouts, and one save. In the summer after his freshman year, he pitched for the Waterloo Bucks of the Northwoods League. In April 2015, Puk and a teammate were arrested and charged with third-degree criminal trespass after they climbed a crane inside a marked construction site on Florida's campus. The charge was later reduced to a misdemeanor and he was briefly suspended. After the suspension, Puk returned to help lead the Gators to the 2015 College World Series.

== Professional career ==
=== Oakland Athletics ===
Puk was ranked among the top prospects for the 2016 Major League Baseball draft in early rankings. The Oakland Athletics selected him in the first round with the sixth overall pick of the draft. He signed a contract with a $4,069,200 signing bonus and was assigned to the Vermont Lake Monsters of the Low–A New York-Penn League. He finished the 2016 season with a 0–4 record and a 3.03 ERA in 10 starts. Puk spent 2017 with the Stockton Ports of the High–A California League and the Midland RockHounds of the Double–A Texas League, pitching in 27 games (24 starts), posting a combined 6–10 record with a 4.03 ERA, along with 184 strikeouts in 124 innings pitched, between both teams. On April 11, 2018, Puk underwent Tommy John surgery, forcing him to miss the 2018 season. Puk began the 2019 season with Midland, and was promoted to the Las Vegas Aviators of the Triple–A Pacific Coast League during the season.

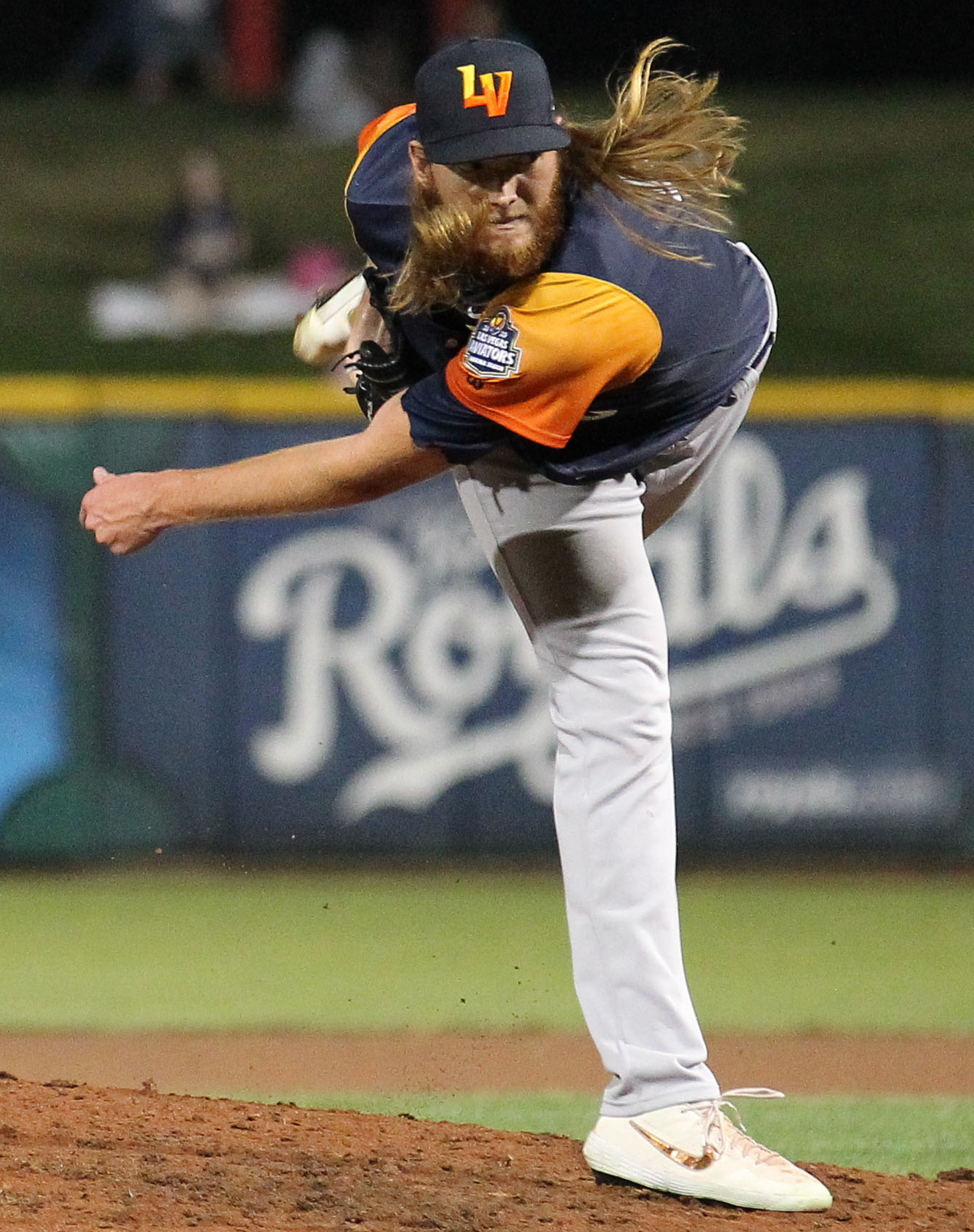
Puk with the Las Vegas Aviators in 2019

On August 20, 2019, the Athletics promoted Puk to the major leagues. Puk made his major league debut against the New York Yankees on August 21, retiring one of three batters faced. Puk earned his first career win on September 5, pitching two innings in relief with one earned run and two strikeouts. Puk finished the season with a 2–0 record with a 3.18 ERA and 13 strikeouts in 10 appearances (11 1/3 innings pitched). On September 6, 2020, Puk continued to have lingering issues in his throwing shoulder during training. On September 11, Athletic's manager Bob Melvin officially shut him down for the season. Puk was scheduled to have shoulder surgery on September 16.

In 2021, Puk appeared in 12 games for Oakland, registering an 0-3 record and 6.08 ERA with 16 strikeouts in 13 1/3 innings pitched. After being stretched out as a starter in spring training in 2022, Puk returned to the bullpen, appearing in 62 contests for the Athletics. Puk recorded his first career save on July 22 against the Texas Rangers. In 66.1 innings pitched, he worked to a 4-3 record and 3.12 ERA with 4 saves and 76 strikeouts.

=== Miami Marlins ===
On February 11, 2023, the Athletics traded Puk to the Miami Marlins in exchange for JJ Bleday. In 58 appearances out of the bullpen, he compiled a 7–5 record and 3.97 ERA with 78 strikeouts and 15 saves over 56 2/3 innings of work.

In 2024, the Marlins attempted to use Puk as a starting pitcher. He made four starts for the Marlins, pitching to a 9.22 ERA, before he went on the injured list. He returned as a relief pitcher.

=== Arizona Diamondbacks ===
On July 25, 2024, the Marlins traded Puk to the Arizona Diamondbacks in exchange for Deyvison De Los Santos and Andrew Pintar. He made 30 appearances for Arizona down the stretch, recording a 1.32 ERA with 43 strikeouts and two saves across 27 1/3 innings pitched.

On April 29, 2025, Puk was shut down after being diagnosed with a flexor strain; he was transferred to the 60-day injured list two days later. On June 20, it was announced that Puk had undergone an internal brace procedure, and would miss the remainder of the season. In eight appearances for Arizona, he had recorded a 3.38 ERA with 12 strikeouts and four saves across eight innings.

On June 13, 2026, while on a rehabilitation assignment with the Triple–A Reno Aces, Puk was shut down due to left shoulder discomfort which was later diagnosed as a capsule sprain. On August 7, Puk was ruled out for the remainder of the season due to the injury.

== International career ==
In the summer of 2015, Puk played for the United States collegiate national team. Against Cuba, Puk, Tanner Houck and Ryan Hendrix combined to throw a no-hitter.
