= 2023 New York Mets season =

2023 New York Mets
- League: National League
- Division: East
- Ballpark: Citi Field
- City: New York City, New York
- Record: 75–87 (.463)
- Divisional place: 4th
- Owners: Steve Cohen
- General manager: Billy Eppler
- Manager: Buck Showalter
- Television: SportsNet New York; PIX 11 (CW affiliate)
- Radio: WCBS 880 AM (English); New York Mets Radio Network

The 2023 New York Mets season was the franchise's 62nd season in Major League Baseball, their 15th at Citi Field, and their third under majority owner Steve Cohen.

The Mets entered the 2023 season with high expectations after finishing the 2022 season with a 101–61 record. However, the season was a major disappointment with injuries to key players, poor performances from players such as Starling Marte, Max Scherzer, and Jeff McNeil, and controversy within the organization and around players. The Mets fell below .500 in early June and became sellers on the August 1st trade deadline. On September 21, the Mets sealed their fifth losing season in seven years when they suffered their 82nd loss of the year, 5–4, to the Philadelphia Phillies. In doing so, New York became the fourth team in Major League history to suffer a losing season one year after winning 100+ games, joining the 1986 Cardinals, the 1971 Reds, and the 1932 Cardinals.

On the following day, September 22, the Mets were eliminated from playoff contention for the sixth time in seven seasons. The Mets finished the regular season 75–87, giving them a fourth-place finish. On October 1, the Mets announced one year after Buck Showalter won NL Manager of the Year, that they had fired Showalter as manager following the season. On October 5, Billy Eppler would resign as their general manager.

== Offseason ==
=== Rule changes ===
Pursuant to the CBA, new rule changes will be in place for the 2023 season:

- institution of a pitch clock between pitches;
- limits on pickoff attempts per plate appearance;
- limits on defensive shifts requiring two infielders to be on either side of second and be within the boundary of the infield; and
- larger bases (increased to 18-inch squares);

=== Transactions ===
==== 2022 ====
- November 9 – re-signed relief pitcher/closer Edwin Díaz to a 5-year, $102 million contract, which includes an opt-out after the 2025 season, a $20 million team option for 2028 and a full no-trade clause.
- November 18 – acquired right-handed pitchers Jeff Brigham and Elieser Hernández from the Miami Marlins in exchange for minor league pitcher Franklin Sanchez and outfielder Jake Mangum.
- December 5 – signed three-time Cy Young Award-winning pitcher Justin Verlander to a 2-year, $86.7 million contract, which includes a $35 million vesting option for 2025. The Mets also acquired left-handed pitcher Brooks Raley from the Tampa Bay Rays in exchange for minor league pitcher Keyshawn Askew.
- December 9 – signed right-handed relief pitcher David Robertson to a 1-year, $10 million contract. The Mets also signed left-handed starting pitcher José Quintana to a 2-year, $26 million contract.
- December 10 – re-signed outfielder Brandon Nimmo to an 8-year, $162 million contract. The Mets also signed right-handed pitcher Kodai Senga from the Fukuoka SoftBank Hawks to a 5-year, $75 million contract.
- December 15 – signed catcher Omar Narváez to a 1-year, $8 million contract with a player option for 2024 worth $7 million (a deal worth up to $15 million if he exercises that option).
- December 20 – re-signed right-handed relief pitcher Adam Ottavino to a 2-year, $14.5 million contract including an opt-out after the 2023 season.
- December 22 – signed infielder Danny Mendick to a one-year, $1 million contract.

==== 2023 ====
- January 14 – re-signed first baseman Pete Alonso to a 1-year, $14.5 million contract for the 2023 season avoiding arbitration.
- January 18 – re-signed catcher Tomás Nido to a 2-year, $3.7 million contract, which covers his remaining arbitration years. He will earn $1.6 million in 2023 and $2.1 million in 2024. The Mets also signed outfielder Tommy Pham to a 1-year, $6 million contract.
- January 27 – re-signed utility player Jeff McNeil to a 4-year, $50 million contract which includes a club option for 2027 that could increase the total value to $63.7 million.

== Regular season ==
=== Transactions ===
==== 2023 ====
- May 4 – signed right-handed relief pitcher Dominic Leone to a one-year contract. The deal is worth $1.5 million prorated for the time he missed (actual value is closer to $1.2 million).
- June 23 – traded infielder Eduardo Escobar and cash considerations to the Los Angeles Angels for pitching prospects Coleman Crow and Landon Marceaux. The Mets were reportedly paying Escobar's salary down to the $720,000 league minimum.
- July 3 – acquired right-handed relief pitchers Trevor Gott and Chris Flexen from the Seattle Mariners in exchange for left-handed pitcher Zach Muckenhirn.
- July 27 – traded closer David Robertson to the Miami Marlins for two Florida Complex League prospects, infielder Marco Vargas and catcher Ronald Hernandez.
- July 29 – traded right-handed pitcher Max Scherzer to the Texas Rangers in exchange for infield prospect Luisangel Acuña.
- July 31 – traded outfielder Mark Canha to the Milwaukee Brewers for right-handed pitching prospect Justin Jarvis.
- August 1 – traded right-handed pitcher Justin Verlander back to the Houston Astros for outfield prospects Drew Gilbert and Ryan Clifford. The Mets also traded outfielder Tommy Pham to the Arizona Diamondbacks in exchange for infield prospect Jeremy Rodriguez, along with trading relief pitcher Dominic Leone to the Los Angeles Angels for infield/outfield prospect Jeremiah Jackson. The Mets also acquired right-handed pitcher Phil Bickford and left-handed pitcher Adam Kolarek from the Los Angeles Dodgers for cash considerations.

== Game log ==
=== Regular season ===
Legend
Mets Win	Mets Loss	Game Postponed	Eliminated from playoff race
Bold = Mets team member

2023 Game Log
Overall: 75–87 (Home: 43–38; Away: 32–49)
March/April: 15–12 (Home: 5–5; Away: 10–7)

#	Date	Opponent	Box Score	Win	Loss	Save	Location (Attendance)	Record
1	March 30	@ Marlins	5–3	**Scherzer** (1–0)	Scott (0–1)	**Robertson** (1)	LoanDepot Park (31,397)	1–0
2	March 31	@ Marlins	1–2	Luzardo (1–0)	**Peterson** (0–1)	Puk (1)	LoanDepot Park (14,797)	1–1
3	April 1	@ Marlins	6–2	**Megill** (1–0)	Nardi (0–1)	—	LoanDepot Park (14,695)	2–1
4	April 2	@ Marlins	5–1	**Senga** (1–0)	Rogers (0–1)	—	LoanDepot Park (18,322)	3–1
5	April 3	@ Brewers	0–10	Peralta (1–0)	**Carrasco** (0–1)	Wilson (1)	American Family Field (42,017)	3–2
6	April 4	@ Brewers	0–9	Miley (1–0)	**Scherzer** (1–1)	—	American Family Field (19,412)	3–3
7	April 5	@ Brewers	6–7	Williams (1–0)	**Ottavino** (0–1)	—	American Family Field (18,387)	3–4
8	April 7	Marlins	9–3	**Megill** (2–0)	Cabrera (0–1)	—	**Citi Field** (43,590)	4–4
9	April 8	Marlins	5–2	**Senga** (2–0)	Rogers (0–2)	**Robertson** (2)	**Citi Field** (42,306)	5–4
10	April 9	Marlins	2–7	Scott (1–1)	**Carrasco** (0–2)	—	**Citi Field** (33,697)	5–5
11	April 10	Padres	5–0	**Scherzer** (2–1)	Darvish (0–1)	—	**Citi Field** (30,244)	6–5
12	April 11	Padres	2–4	Weathers (1–0)	**Peterson** (0–2)	Hader (4)	**Citi Field** (30,769)	6–6
13	April 12	Padres	5–2	**Megill** (3–0)	Snell (0–2)	**Ottavino** (1)	**Citi Field** (34,876)	7–6
14	April 14	@ Athletics	17–6	**Santana** (1–0)	Kaprielian (0–2)	—	Oakland Coliseum (11,102)	8–6
15	April 15	@ Athletics	3–2	**Smith** (1–0)	Fujinami (0–3)	**Robertson** (3)	Oakland Coliseum (12,967)	9–6
16	April 16	@ Athletics	4–3 (10)	**Yacabonis** (1–0)	Moll (0–2)	**Robertson** (4)	Oakland Coliseum (17,645)	10–6
17	April 17	@ Dodgers	8–6	**Peterson** (1–2)	Vesia (0–1)	**Ottavino** (2)	Dodger Stadium (50,313)	11–6
18	April 18	@ Dodgers	0–5	Kershaw (3–1)	**Megill** (3–1)	—	Dodger Stadium (46,884)	11–7
19	April 19	@ Dodgers	5–3	**Yacabonis** (2–0)	Syndergaard (0–3)	**Ottavino** (3)	Dodger Stadium (43,990)	12–7
20	April 20	@ Giants	9–4	**Senga** (3–0)	Manaea (0–1)	—	Oracle Park (24,452)	13–7
21	April 21	@ Giants	7–0	**Lucchesi** (1–0)	DeSclafani (1–1)	—	Oracle Park (27,551)	14–7
22	April 22	@ Giants	4–7	Webb (1–4)	**Peterson** (1–3)	—	Oracle Park (29,912)	14–8
23	April 23	@ Giants	4–5	Alexander (2–0)	**Smith** (1–1)	Doval (2)	Oracle Park (27,721)	14–9
24	April 25	Nationals	0–5	Gray (1–4)	**Butto** (0–1)	Thompson (1)	**Citi Field** (20,507)	14–10
25	April 26	Nationals	1–4	Gore (3–1)	**Senga** (3–1)	Finnegan (5)	**Citi Field** (20,191)	14–11
26	April 27	Nationals	9–8	**Robertson** (1–0)	Thompson (2–2)	—	**Citi Field** (20,726)	15–11
27	April 28	Braves	0–4 (5)	Fried (2–0)	**Peterson** (1–4)	—	**Citi Field** (29,240)	15–12
—	April 29	Braves	Postponed (inclement weather); rescheduled for August 12					
—	April 30	Braves	Postponed (inclement weather); rescheduled for May 1					

May: 14–15 (Home: 9–4; Away: 5–11)

#	Date	Opponent	Box Score	Win	Loss	Save	Location (Attendance)	Record
28	May 1 (1)	Braves	8–9	Strider (4–0)	**Reyes** (0–1)	Minter (6)	**Citi Field** (see 2nd game)	15–13
29	May 1 (2)	Braves	5–3	**Smith** (2–1)	Morton (3–3)	**Robertson** (5)	**Citi Field** (27,603)	16–13
—	May 2	@ Tigers	Postponed (inclement weather); rescheduled for May 3					
30	May 3 (1)	@ Tigers	5–6	Alexander (1–0)	**Ottavino** (0–2)	Lange (4)	Comerica Park (11,363)	16–14
31	May 3 (2)	@ Tigers	1–8	Lorenzen (1–1)	**Scherzer** (2–2)	—	Comerica Park (16,734)	16–15
32	May 4	@ Tigers	0–2	Rodríguez (3–2)	**Verlander** (0–1)	Lange (5)	Comerica Park (18,369)	16–16
33	May 5	Rockies	1–0	**Senga** (4–1)	Senzatela (0–1)	**Ottavino** (4)	**Citi Field** (25,854)	17–16
34	May 6	Rockies	2–5	Gomber (3–4)	**Megill** (3–2)	Johnson (5)	**Citi Field** (35,692)	17–17
35	May 7	Rockies	6–13	Suter (1–0)	**Yacabonis** (2–1)	—	**Citi Field** (36,501)	17–18
36	May 9	@ Reds	6–7	Weaver (1–2)	**Peterson** (1–5)	Díaz (7)	Great American Ball Park (14,065)	17–19
37	May 10	@ Reds	2–1	**Verlander** (1–1)	Greene (0–3)	**Robertson** (6)	Great American Ball Park (14,515)	18–19
38	May 11	@ Reds	0–5	Lively (1–0)	**Senga** (4–2)	Herget (1)	Great American Ball Park (14,855)	18–20
39	May 12	@ Nationals	3–2	**Megill** (4–2)	Edwards Jr. (1–2)	**Smith** (1)	Nationals Park (31,904)	19–20
—	May 13	@ Nationals	Suspended (inclement weather); resuming May 14					
40	May 14 (1)	@ Nationals	2–3	Harvey (2–0)	**Leone** (0–1)	Finnegan (8)	Nationals Park (24,336)	19–21
41	May 14 (2)	@ Nationals	8–2	**Scherzer** (3–2)	Irvin (1–1)	—	Nationals Park (21,507)	20–21
42	May 15	@ Nationals	3–10	Corbin (2–5)	**Peterson** (1–6)	—	Nationals Park (15,220)	20–22
43	May 16	Rays	5–8	Chirinos (2–1)	**Verlander** (1–2)	—	**Citi Field** (28,296)	20–23
44	May 17	Rays	8–7 (10)	**Robertson** (1–0)	Fairbanks (0–1)	—	**Citi Field** (29,695)	21–23
45	May 18	Rays	3–2	**Megill** (5–2)	Littell (0–1)	**Robertson** (7)	**Citi Field** (29,946)	22–23
46	May 19	Guardians	10–9 (10)	**Smith** (3–1)	Clase (1–4)	—	**Citi Field** (35,010)	23–23
—	May 20	Guardians	Postponed (inclement weather); rescheduled for May 21					
47	May 21 (1)	Guardians	5–4	**Robertson** (2–0)	Stephan (2–2)	—	**Citi Field** (39,995)	24–23
48	May 21 (2)	Guardians	2–1	**Verlander** (2–2)	Bieber (3–3)	**Raley** (1)	**Citi Field** (29,862)	25–23
49	May 23	@ Cubs	2–7	Smyly (5–1)	**Megill** (5–3)	—	Wrigley Field (35,958)	25–24
50	May 24	@ Cubs	2–4	Stroman (4–4)	**Senga** (4–3)	Leiter Jr. (2)	Wrigley Field (33,636)	25–25
51	May 25	@ Cubs	10–1	**Carrasco** (1–2)	Hendricks (0–1)	—	Wrigley Field (35,446)	26–25
52	May 26	@ Rockies	5–2	**Scherzer** (4–2)	Seabold (1–2)	**Ottavino** (5)	Coors Field (30,288)	27–25
53	May 27	@ Rockies	7–10	Lawrence (2–2)	**Brigham** (0–1)	Johnson (11)	Coors Field (36,874)	27–26
54	May 28	@ Rockies	10–11	Lambert (1–1)	**Nogosek** (0–1)	—	Coors Field (47,471)	27–27
55	May 30	Phillies	2–0	**Senga** (5–3)	Suárez (0–2)	**Robertson** (8)	**Citi Field** (36,236)	28–27
56	May 31	Phillies	4–1	**Carrasco** (2–2)	Nola (4–4)	**Robertson** (9)	**Citi Field** (39,641)	29–27

June: 7–19 (Home: 4–10; Away: 3–9)

#	Date	Opponent	Box Score	Win	Loss	Save	Location (Attendance)	Record
57	June 1	Phillies	4–2	**Scherzer** (5–2)	Walker (4–3)	**Smith** (2)	**Citi Field** (38,302)	30–27
58	June 2	Blue Jays	0–3	Bassitt (6–4)	**Verlander** (2–3)	Romano (14)	**Citi Field** (42,637)	30–28
59	June 3	Blue Jays	1–2	Pearson (2–0)	**Robertson** (2–1)	Swanson (1)	**Citi Field** (37,704)	30–29
60	June 4	Blue Jays	4–6	Pearson (3–0)	**Leone** (0–2)	Romano (15)	**Citi Field** (42,169)	30–30
61	June 6	@ Braves	4–6	Elder (4–0)	**Smith** (3–2)	Iglesias (8)	Truist Park (37,365)	30–31
62	June 7	@ Braves	5–7	Anderson (4–0)	**Raley** (1–1)	Minter (8)	Truist Park (40,178)	30–32
63	June 8	@ Braves	10–13 (10)	Iglesias (2–2)	**Hunter** (0–1)	—	Truist Park (39,347)	30–33
64	June 9	@ Pirates	7–14	Hill (6–5)	**Megill** (5–4)	—	PNC Park (29,429)	30–34
65	June 10	@ Pirates	5–1	**Senga** (6–3)	Oviedo (3–5)	—	PNC Park (35,290)	31–34
66	June 11	@ Pirates	1–2	Keller (8–2)	**Carrasco** (2–3)	Bednar (14)	PNC Park (26,770)	31–35
67	June 13	Yankees	6–7	Marinaccio (3–3)	**Walker** (0–1)	King (4)	**Citi Field** (43,707)	31–36
68	June 14	Yankees	4–3 (10)	**Leone** (1–2)	Abreu (2–2)	—	**Citi Field** (44,121)	32–36
69	June 16	Cardinals	6–1	**Megill** (6–4)	Mikolas (4–4)	—	**Citi Field** (33,948)	33–36
70	June 17	Cardinals	3–5	Wainwright (3–1)	**Senga** (6–4)	Hicks (1)	**Citi Field** (39,143)	33–37
71	June 18	Cardinals	7–8	VerHagen (4–0)	**Ottavino** (0–3)	Hicks (2)	**Citi Field** (43,110)	33–38
72	June 19	@ Astros	11–1	**Scherzer** (6–2)	Brown (6–4)	—	Minute Maid Park (33,185)	34–38
73	June 20	@ Astros	2–4	Valdez (7–5)	**Verlander** (2–4)	Pressly (13)	Minute Maid Park (34,606)	34–39
74	June 21	@ Astros	8–10	Maton (1–2)	**Leone** (1–3)	Pressly (14)	Minute Maid Park (38,279)	34–40
75	June 23	@ Phillies	1–5	Walker (8–3)	**Senga** (6–5)	—	Citizens Bank Park (35,093)	34–41
76	June 24	@ Phillies	4–2	**Scherzer** (7–2)	Sánchez (0–1)	**Robertson** (10)	Citizens Bank Park (43,586)	35–41
77	June 25	@ Phillies	6–7	Hoffman (1–1)	**Brigham** (0–2)	Kimbrel (11)	Citizens Bank Park (42,901)	35–42
78	June 26	Brewers	1–2	Rea (4–4)	**Smith** (3–3)	Williams (14)	**Citi Field** (34,384)	35–43
79	June 27	Brewers	7–2	**Peterson** (2–6)	Teherán (2–3)	—	**Citi Field** (35,295)	36–43
80	June 28	Brewers	2–5	Wilson (3–0)	**Hartwig** (0–1)	Williams (15)	**Citi Field** (28,440)	36–44
81	June 29	Brewers	2–3	Houser (3–2)	**McFarland** (0–1)	Williams (16)	**Citi Field** (30,282)	36–45
82	June 30	Giants	4–5	Manaea (3–3)	**Robertson** (2–2)	Doval (24)	**Citi Field** (30,116)	36–46

July: 14–9 (Home: 8–4; Away: 6–5)

#	Date	Opponent	Box Score	Win	Loss	Save	Location (Attendance)	Record
83	July 1	Giants	4–1	**Verlander** (3–4)	DeSclafani (4–8)	**Ottavino** (6)	**Citi Field** (34,887)	37–46
84	July 2	Giants	8–4	**Hartwig** (1–1)	Wood (3–3)	—	**Citi Field** (28,473)	38–46
85	July 4	@ Diamondbacks	8–5	**Scherzer** (8–2)	Castro (4–3)	**Robertson** (11)	Chase Field (41,670)	39–46
86	July 5	@ Diamondbacks	2–1	**Senga** (7–5)	Chafin (2–2)	**Robertson** (12)	Chase Field (18,152)	40–46
87	July 6	@ Diamondbacks	9–0	**Carrasco** (3–3)	Nelson (5–5)	—	Chase Field (18,514)	41–46
88	July 7	@ Padres	7–5 (10)	**Smith** (4–3)	Cosgrove (1–2)	—	Petco Park (42,712)	42–46
89	July 8	@ Padres	1–3	Snell (6–7)	**Peterson** (2–7)	Hader (21)	Petco Park (42,647)	42–47
90	July 9	@ Padres	2–6	Musgrove (8–2)	**Scherzer** (8–3)	—	Petco Park (42,745)	42–48
**93rd All-Star Game in Seattle, Washington**
91	July 14	Dodgers	0–6	Urías (7–5)	**Verlander** (3–5)	—	**Citi Field** (40,503)	42–49
92	July 15	Dodgers	1–5	Graterol (3–2)	**Ottavino** (0–4)	—	**Citi Field** (38,225)	42–50
93	July 16	Dodgers	2–1 (10)	**Robertson** (4–2)	Robertson (0–1)	—	**Citi Field** (34,805)	43–50
94	July 18	White Sox	11–10	**Hartwig** (2–1)	Giolito (6–6)	**Robertson** (13)	**Citi Field** (37,109)	44–50
95	July 19	White Sox	5–1	**Verlander** (4–5)	Toussaint (0–3)	—	**Citi Field** (34,873)	45–50
96	July 20	White Sox	2–6	Kopech (4–8)	**Quintana** (0–1)	—	**Citi Field** (34,751)	45–51
—	July 21	@ Red Sox	Suspended (rain); resuming July 22					
97	July 22 (1)	@ Red Sox	5–4	**Hartwig** (3–1)	Crawford (4–5)	**Robertson** (14)	Fenway Park (37,035)	46–51
98	July 22 (2)	@ Red Sox	6–8	Paxton (6–2)	**Scherzer** (8–4)	Jansen (21)	Fenway Park (36,505)	46–52
99	July 23	@ Red Sox	1–6	Murphy (1–0)	**Carrasco** (3–4)	—	Fenway Park (35,619)	46–53
100	July 25	@ Yankees	9–3	**Verlander** (5–5)	Germán (5–7)	—	Yankee Stadium (46,540)	47–53
101	July 26	@ Yankees	1–3	Rodón (1–3)	**Quintana** (0–2)	Holmes (14)	Yankee Stadium (46,761)	47–54
102	July 27	Nationals	2–1	**Peterson** (3–7)	Thompson (3–4)	**Raley** (2)	**Citi Field** (32,834)	48–54
103	July 28	Nationals	5–1	**Scherzer** (9–4)	Gore (6–8)	—	**Citi Field** (25,385)	49–54
104	July 29	Nationals	6–11	Corbin (7–11)	**Carrasco** (3–5)	—	**Citi Field** (30,858)	49–55
105	July 30	Nationals	5–2	**Verlander** (6–5)	Williams (5–6)	**Raley** (3)	**Citi Field** (33,861)	50–55

August: 11–18 (Home: 7–9; Away: 4–9)

#	Date	Opponent	Box Score	Win	Loss	Save	Location (Attendance)	Record
106	August 1	@ Royals	6–7 (10)	Hernández (1–6)	**Raley** (0–2)	—	Kauffman Stadium (16,140)	50–56
107	August 2	@ Royals	0–4	Ragans (3–3)	**Senga** (7–6)	—	Kauffman Stadium (13,630)	50–57
108	August 3	@ Royals	2–9	Singer (7–8)	**Carrasco** (3–6)	—	Kauffman Stadium (11,926)	50–58
109	August 4	@ Orioles	3–10	Baumann (9–0)	**Bickford** (2–4)	—	Camden Yards (29,550)	50–59
110	August 5	@ Orioles	3–7	Gibson (11–6)	**Megill** (6–5)	—	Camden Yards (44,326)	50–60
111	August 6	@ Orioles	0–2	Pérez (4–1)	**Quintana** (0–3)	Bautista (30)	Camden Yards (27,100)	50–61
112	August 7	Cubs	11–2	**Senga** (8–6)	Smyly (8–8)	—	**Citi Field** (29,070)	51–61
113	August 8	Cubs	2–3	Taillon (7–6)	**Smith** (4–4)	Alzolay (15)	**Citi Field** (29,640)	51–62
114	August 9	Cubs	4–3	**Hartwig** (4–1)	Wesneski (2–4)	**Bickford** (1)	**Citi Field** (37,527)	52–62
115	August 11	Braves	0–7	Morton (11–10)	**Megill** (6–6)	—	**Citi Field** (37,339)	52–63
116	August 12 (1)	Braves	3–21	Winans (1–0)	**Reyes** (0–2)	—	**Citi Field** (39,859)	52–64
117	August 12 (2)	Braves	0–6	Strider (13–4)	**Quintana** (0–4)	—	**Citi Field** (30,254)	52–65
118	August 13	Braves	7–6	**Senga** (9–6)	Chirinos (5–5)	**Ottavino** (7)	**Citi Field** (30,338)	53–65
119	August 14	Pirates	7–2	**Miller** (1–0)	Priester (2–2)	—	**Citi Field** (23,151)	54–65
120	August 15	Pirates	4–7	Selby (1–0)	**Butto** (0–2)	Bednar (25)	**Citi Field** (35,439)	54–66
121	August 16	Pirates	8–3	**Megill** (7–6)	Oviedo (6–13)	—	**Citi Field** (30,049)	55–66
122	August 17	@ Cardinals	4–2	**Quintana** (1–4)	Wainwright (3–8)	**Gott** (1)	Busch Stadium (36,155)	56–66
123	August 18	@ Cardinals	7–1	**Lucchesi** (2–0)	Thompson (2–5)	—	Busch Stadium (42,076)	57–66
124	August 19	@ Cardinals	13–2	**Senga** (10–6)	Mikolas (6–9)	—	Busch Stadium (40,303)	58–66
125	August 20	@ Cardinals	3–7	Hudson (5–0)	**Carrasco** (3–7)	—	Busch Stadium (37,470)	58–67
126	August 21	@ Braves	10–4	**Bickford** (3–4)	Winans (1–1)	—	Truist Park (33,216)	59–67
127	August 22	@ Braves	2–3	Elder (10–4)	**Megill** (7–7)	Iglesias (25)	Truist Park (36,841)	59–68
128	August 23	@ Braves	0–7	Morton (13–10)	**Quintana** (1–5)	—	Truist Park (35,674)	59–69
129	August 25	Angels	1–3	Sandoval (7–10)	**Senga** (10–7)	Estévez (27)	**Citi Field** (38,271)	59–70
130	August 26	Angels	3–5	Loup (2–2)	**Carrasco** (3–8)	Estévez (28)	**Citi Field** (35,890)	59–71
131	August 27	Angels	3–2	**Ottavino** (1–4)	López (2–7)	—	**Citi Field** (38,341)	60–71
132	August 28	Rangers	3–4	Pérez (9–4)	**Gott** (0–4)	Leclerc (2)	**Citi Field** (21,696)	60–72
133	August 29	Rangers	1–2	Stratton (2–1)	**Smith** (4–5)	Chapman (4)	**Citi Field** (29,353)	60–73
134	August 30	Rangers	6–5 (10)	**Brigham** (1–2)	Chapman (5–3)	—	**Citi Field** (23,849)	61–73

September/October: 14–14 (Home: 10–7; Away: 4–7)

#	Date	Opponent	Box Score	Win	Loss	Save	Location (Attendance)	Record
135	September 1	Mariners	2–1	**Bickford** (4–4)	Muñoz (3–6)	**Smith** (3)	**Citi Field** (33,340)	62–73
136	September 2	Mariners	7–8	Topa (5–4)	**Ottavino** (1–5)	—	**Citi Field** (31,480)	62–74
137	September 3	Mariners	6–3	**Megill** (8–7)	Kirby (10–9)	**Ottavino** (8)	**Citi Field** (27,764)	63–74
138	September 5	@ Nationals	11–5	**Quintana** (2–5)	Corbin (9–13)	—	Nationals Park (22,897)	64–74
139	September 6	@ Nationals	2–3	Finnegan (7–4)	**Bickford** (4–5)	—	Nationals Park (24,297)	64–75
140	September 8	@ Twins	2–5	Thielbar (3–1)	**Reid-Foley** (0–1)	Durán (25)	Target Field (26,154)	64–76
141	September 9	@ Twins	4–8	Maeda (4–7)	**Peterson** (3–8)	—	Target Field (30,673)	64–77
142	September 10	@ Twins	2–0	**Raley** (1–2)	Jax (6–9)	**Ottavino** (9)	Target Field (22,890)	65–77
143	September 11	Diamondbacks	3–4	Ginkel (9–0)	**Smith** (4–6)	Sewald (33)	**Citi Field** (25,230)	65–78
144	September 12	Diamondbacks	7–4	**Butto** (1–2)	Nelson (7–8)	**Ottavino** (10)	**Citi Field** (33,506)	66–78
145	September 13	Diamondbacks	7–1	**Lucchesi** (3–0)	Gallen (15–8)	—	**Citi Field** (22,026)	67–78
146	September 14	Diamondbacks	11–1	**Senga** (11–7)	Kelly (11–7)	—	**Citi Field** (22,879)	68–78
147	September 15	Reds	3–5	Sims (6–3)	**Hartwig** (4–2)	Díaz (37)	**Citi Field** (27,811)	68–79
148	September 16	Reds	2–3	Duarte (3–0)	**Megill** (8–8)	Law (2)	**Citi Field** (32,633)	68–80
149	September 17	Reds	8–4	**Quintana** (3–5)	Williamson (4–5)	—	**Citi Field** (38,044)	69–80
150	September 18	@ Marlins	2–1	**Bickford** (5–5)	Scott (8–5)	**Ottavino** (11)	LoanDepot Park (14,577)	70–80
151	September 19	@ Marlins	3–4	Scott (9–5)	**Gott** (0–5)	—	LoanDepot Park (10,897)	70–81
152	September 20	@ Marlins	8–3	**Senga** (12–7)	Pérez (5–6)	—	LoanDepot Park (12,045)	71–81
153	September 21	@ Phillies	4–5	Suárez (4–6)	**Brigham** (1–3)	Alvarado (9)	Citizens Bank Park (30,116)	71–82
154	September 22	@ Phillies	4–5 (10)	Domínguez (5–5)	**Ottavino** (1–6)	—	Citizens Bank Park (38,795)	71–83
155	September 23	@ Phillies	5–7	Wheeler (13–6)	**Quintana** (3–6)	Alvarado (10)	Citizens Bank Park (40,388)	71–84
156	September 24	@ Phillies	2–5	Sánchez (3–5)	**Butto** (1–3)	Lorenzen (1)	Citizens Bank Park (41,139)	71–85
—	September 26	Marlins	Postponed (unplayable field conditions); rescheduled for September 27					
157	September 27 (1)	Marlins	11–2	**Lucchesi** (4–0)	Garrett (9–7)	—	**Citi Field** (see 2nd game)	72–85
158	September 27 (2)	Marlins	2–4	Moore (5–1)	**Ottavino** (1–7)	Nardi (3)	**Citi Field** (24,966)	72–86
159	September 28	Marlins	1–0 (8)	**Hartwig** (5–2)	Luzardo (10–10)	—	**Citi Field** (31,097)	73–86
—	September 29	Phillies	Postponed (rain); rescheduled for September 30					
160	September 30 (1)	Phillies	4–3	**Megill** (9–8)	Walker (15–6)	**Ottavino** (12)	**Citi Field** (see 2nd game)	74–86
161	September 30 (2)	Phillies	11–4	**Garrett** (1–0)	Plassmeyer (0–1)	—	**Citi Field** (41,102)	75–86
162	October 1	Phillies	1–9	Nelson (1–0)	**Butto** (1–4)	—	**Citi Field** (41,212)	75–87

== Roster ==
2023 New York Mets
Roster
Pitchers: 50 Phil Bickford; 43 Jeff Brigham; 70 José Buttó; 59 Carlos Carrasco; 45 Sam Coonrod; 46 John Curtiss; 75 Reed Garrett; 33 Trevor Gott; 93 Grant Hartwig; 29 Tommy Hunter; 64 Anthony Kay; 66 Adam Kolarek; 50 Dominic Leone; 47 Joey Lucchesi; 44 T. J. McFarland; 38 Tylor Megill; 67 Tyson Miller; 71 Zach Muckenhirn; 68 Vinny Nittoli; 85 Stephen Nogosek; 0 Adam Ottavino; 23 David Peterson; 62 José Quintana; 25 Brooks Raley; 71 Sean Reid-Foley; 72 Denyi Reyes; 30 David Robertson; 65 Dennis Santana; 21 Max Scherzer; 34 Kodai Senga; 40 Drew Smith; 64 Edwin Uceta; 35 Justin Verlander; 91 Josh Walker; 73 Jimmy Yacabonis	Catchers: 4 Francisco Álvarez; 2 Omar Narváez; 3 Tomas Nido; 61 Michael Pérez; 33 Gary Sánchez; Infielders: 20 Pete Alonso; 19 Jonathan Araúz; 22 Brett Baty; 10 Eduardo Escobar; 13 Luis Guillorme; 12 Francisco Lindor; 10 Ronny Mauricio; 1 Jeff McNeil; 15 Danny Mendick; 27 Mark Vientos	Outfielders: 28 Abraham Almonte; 19 Mark Canha; 26 Tim Locastro; 6 Starling Marte; 9 Brandon Nimmo; 30 Rafael Ortega; 28 Tommy Pham; 29 DJ Stewart; Other batters: 32 Daniel Vogelbach	Manager: 11 Buck Showalter; Coaches: 79 Danny Barnes (assistant pitching); 49 Jeremy Barnes (hitting); 51 Eric Chavez (bench); 58 Dom Chiti (bullpen); 56 Joey Cora (third base/infield); 80 Rafael Fernandez (BP pitcher); 55 Jeremy Hefner (pitching); 52 Eric Hinske (assistant hitting); 54 Wayne Kirby (first base); 78 Eric Langill (bullpen catcher); 76 Aaron Myers (bullpen pitcher); 77 Dave Racaniello (bullpen catcher); 53 Glenn Sherlock (catching)

== Season standings ==
=== National League East ===
NL East
Team	W	L	Pct.	GB	Home	Road
Atlanta Braves	104	58	.642	—	52‍–‍29	52‍–‍29
Philadelphia Phillies	90	72	.556	14	49‍–‍32	41‍–‍40
Miami Marlins	84	78	.519	20	46‍–‍35	38‍–‍43
New York Mets	75	87	.463	29	43‍–‍38	32‍–‍49
Washington Nationals	71	91	.438	33	34‍–‍47	37‍–‍44

=== National League Wild Card ===
Division leaders
Team	W	L	Pct.
Atlanta Braves	104	58	.642
Los Angeles Dodgers	100	62	.617
Milwaukee Brewers	92	70	.568

Wild Card teams (Top 3 teams qualify for postseason)
Team	W	L	Pct.	GB
Philadelphia Phillies	90	72	.556	+6
Miami Marlins	84	78	.519	—
Arizona Diamondbacks	84	78	.519	—
Chicago Cubs	83	79	.512	1
San Diego Padres	82	80	.506	2
Cincinnati Reds	82	80	.506	2
San Francisco Giants	79	83	.488	5
Pittsburgh Pirates	76	86	.469	8
New York Mets	75	87	.463	9
St. Louis Cardinals	71	91	.438	13
Washington Nationals	71	91	.438	13
Colorado Rockies	59	103	.364	25

=== Record vs. opponents ===
==== Record vs. National League ====
2023 National League record Source: MLB Standings Grid – 2023
Team	AZ	ATL	CHC	CIN	COL	LAD	MIA	MIL	NYM	PHI	PIT	SD	SF	STL	WSH	AL
Arizona	—	3–3	6–1	3–4	10–3	5–8	2–4	4–2	1–6	3–4	4–2	7–6	7–6	3–3	5–1	21–25
Atlanta	3–3	—	4–2	5–1	7–0	4–3	9–4	5–1	10–3	8–5	4–3	3–4	4–2	4–2	8–5	26–20
Chicago	1–6	2–4	—	6–7	4–2	3–4	2–4	6–7	3–3	1–5	10–3	4–3	5–1	8–5	3–4	25–21
Cincinnati	4–3	1–5	7–6	—	4–2	4–2	3–3	3–10	4–2	3–4	5–8	3–3	3–4	6–7	4–3	28–18
Colorado	3–10	0–7	2–4	2–4	—	3–10	5–2	4–2	4–2	2–5	2–4	4–9	4–9	3–3	3–4	18–28
Los Angeles	8–5	3–4	4–3	2–4	10–3	—	3–3	5–1	3–3	4–2	4–3	9–4	7–6	4–3	4–2	30–16
Miami	4–2	4–9	4–2	3–3	2–5	3–3	—	3–4	4–8	7–6	5–2	2–4	3–3	3–4	11–2	26–20
Milwaukee	2–4	1–5	7–6	10–3	2–4	1–5	4–3	—	6–1	4–2	8–5	6–1	2–5	8–5	3–3	28–18
New York	6–1	3–10	3–3	2–4	2–4	3–3	8–4	1–6	—	6–7	3–3	3–3	4–3	4–3	7–6	19–27
Philadelphia	4–3	5–8	5–1	4–3	5–2	2–4	6–7	2–4	7–6	—	3–3	5–2	2–4	5–1	7–6	28–18
Pittsburgh	2–4	3–4	3–10	8–5	4–2	3–4	2–5	5–8	3–3	3–3	—	5–1	2–4	9–4	5–2	19–27
San Diego	6–7	4–3	3–4	3–3	9–4	4–9	4–2	1–6	3–3	2–5	1–5	—	8–5	3–3	3–3	28–18
San Francisco	6–7	2–4	1–5	4–3	9–4	6–7	3–3	5–2	3–4	4–2	4–2	5–8	—	6–1	1–5	20–26
St. Louis	3–3	2–4	5–8	7–6	3–3	3–4	4–3	5–8	3–4	1–5	4–9	3–3	1–6	—	4–2	23–23
Washington	1–5	5–8	4–3	3–4	4–3	2–4	2–11	3–3	6–7	6–7	2–5	3–3	5–1	2–4	—	23–23

Updated with the results of all games through October 1, 2023.

==== Record vs. American League ====
2023 National League record vs. American League Source: MLB Standings
Team	BAL	BOS	CWS	CLE	DET	HOU	KC	LAA	MIN	NYY	OAK	SEA	TB	TEX	TOR
Arizona	1–2	1–2	2–1	2–1	3–0	0–3	2–1	2–1	0–3	1–2	2–1	1–2	1–2	3–1	0–3
Atlanta	2–1	1–3	1–2	2–1	2–1	0–3	3–0	2–1	3–0	3–0	1–2	2–1	2–1	2–1	0–3
Chicago	2–1	1–2	3–1	1–2	2–1	0–3	2–1	0–3	1–2	2–1	3–0	2–1	2–1	2–1	2–1
Cincinnati	2–1	2–1	1–2	2–2	2–1	3–0	3–0	3–0	1–2	0–3	2–1	2–1	1–2	3–0	1–2
Colorado	1–2	2–1	2–1	2–1	1–2	1–3	2–1	2–1	1–2	2–1	1–2	0–3	0–3	0–3	1–2
Los Angeles	2–1	2–1	2–1	2–1	2–1	2–1	1–2	4–0	2–1	1–2	3–0	3–0	1–2	2–1	1–2
Miami	0–3	3–0	2–1	2–1	2–1	1–2	3–0	3–0	2–1	2–1	3–0	1–2	1–3	0–3	1–2
Milwaukee	2–1	1–2	3–0	2–1	1–2	2–1	3–0	2–1	2–2	2–1	0–3	3–0	1–2	3–0	1–2
New York	0–3	1–2	2–1	3–0	0–3	1–2	0–3	1–2	1–2	2–2	3–0	2–1	2–1	1–2	0–3
Philadelphia	2–1	1–2	2–1	1–2	3–0	2–1	2–1	2–1	1–2	1–2	3–0	2–1	3–0	0–3	3–1
Pittsburgh	1–2	3–0	2–1	1–2	2–2	1–2	3–0	1–2	1–2	1–2	1–2	1–2	0–3	1–2	0–3
San Diego	2–1	1–2	3–0	2–1	2–1	1–2	1–2	3–0	1–2	1–2	3–0	1–3	2–1	3–0	2–1
San Francisco	1–2	2–1	2–1	2–1	0–3	2–1	1–2	1–2	2–1	1–2	2–2	1–2	1–2	1–2	1–2
St. Louis	2–1	3–0	2–1	1–2	1–2	1–2	2–2	0–3	1–2	2–1	2–1	1–2	2–1	1–2	2–1
Washington	0–4	2–1	2–1	1–2	2–1	1–2	2–1	1–2	2–1	2–1	3–0	2–1	0–3	2–1	1–2

Updated with the results of all games through October 1, 2023.

== Player statistics ==
= Indicates team leader (Note: To qualify as a team leader in AVG, OBP, SLG, or OPS, a player must have 3.1 plate appearances per team game.)

=== Batting ===
Note: G = Games played; AB = At bats; R = Runs; H = Hits; 2B = Doubles; 3B = Triples; HR = Home runs; RBI = Runs batted in; BB = Walks; SO = Strikeouts; SB = Stolen bases; CS = Caught stealing; AVG = Batting average; OBP = On-base percentage; SLG = Slugging percentage; OPS = On-base plus slugging

Player	G	AB	R	H	2B	3B	HR	RBI	BB	SO	SB	CS	AVG	OBP	SLG	OPS
Francisco Lindor	160	602	108	153	33	2	31	98	66	137	31	4	.254	.336	.470	.806
Brandon Nimmo	152	592	89	162	30	6	24	68	74	146	3	3	.274	.363	.466	.829
Jeff McNeil	156	585	75	158	25	4	10	55	39	65	10	0	.270	.333	.378	.711
Pete Alonso	154	568	92	123	21	2	46	118	65	151	4	1	.217	.318	.504	.821
Francisco Alvarez	123	382	51	80	12	0	25	63	34	110	2	0	.209	.284	.437	.721
Brett Baty	108	353	41	75	12	0	9	34	29	109	2	0	.212	.275	.323	.598
Starling Marte	86	315	38	78	7	1	5	28	16	69	24	4	.248	.301	.324	.625
Daniel Vogelbach	104	275	33	64	8	0	13	48	42	81	0	0	.233	.339	.404	.742
Mark Canha	89	257	28	63	15	1	6	29	32	52	7	0	.245	.343	.381	.725
Tommy Pham	79	231	29	62	15	1	10	36	29	56	11	1	.268	.348	.472	.820
Mark Vientos	65	218	19	46	5	1	9	22	10	71	1	0	.211	.253	.367	.620
DJ Stewart	58	160	21	39	9	0	11	26	15	56	1	1	.244	.333	.506	.840
Omar Narváez	49	128	12	27	5	0	2	7	14	27	0	0	.211	.283	.297	.580
Rafael Ortega	47	114	16	25	3	0	1	8	20	33	6	1	.219	.341	.272	.613
Eduardo Escobar	40	110	15	26	3	2	4	16	8	24	2	0	.236	.286	.409	.695
Luis Guillorme	54	107	12	24	6	1	1	9	10	28	0	0	.224	.288	.327	.615
Ronny Mauricio	26	101	11	25	4	0	2	9	7	31	7	0	.248	.296	.347	.643
Danny Mendick	33	65	4	12	3	0	1	4	4	15	1	0	.185	.232	.277	.509
Jonathan Araúz	27	59	3	8	0	0	3	9	5	18	0	0	.136	.203	.288	.491
Tim Locastro	43	56	13	13	3	0	2	3	3	22	6	0	.232	.338	.393	.731
Tomás Nido	22	56	5	7	0	0	0	1	2	18	0	0	.125	.153	.125	.278
Abraham Almonte	8	15	1	1	1	0	0	0	1	8	0	0	.067	.125	.133	.258
Michael Perez	3	8	1	4	1	0	0	0	0	1	0	0	.500	.500	.625	1.125
Gary Sánchez	3	6	0	1	0	0	0	1	0	3	0	0	.167	.143	.167	.310
Team totals	162	5363	717	1276	221	21	215	692	525	1331	118	15	.238	.316	.407	.723
Rank in 15 NL teams	—	15	11	14	15	10	4	10	12	7	9	1	14	10	9	9

Source:Baseball Reference

=== Pitching ===
Yellow background = team leader in category (Note: To qualify as a team leader in ERA or WHIP, a player must have 1.0 IP per team game.)

Note: W = Wins; L = Losses; ERA = Earned run average; G = Games pitched; GS = Games started; SV = Saves; IP = Innings pitched; H = Hits allowed; R = Runs allowed; ER = Earned runs allowed; HR = Home runs allowed; HBP = Hit by pitch; BB = Walks allowed (bases on balls); SO = Strikeouts; WHIP = Walks + hits per inning pitched

Player	W	L	ERA	G	GS	SV	IP	H	R	ER	HR	HBP	BB	SO	WHIP
Kodai Senga	12	7	2.98	29	29	0	166.1	126	60	55	17	5	77	202	1.220
Tylor Megill	9	8	4.70	25	25	0	126.1	141	76	66	18	6	58	105	1.575
David Peterson	3	8	5.03	27	21	0	111.0	124	64	62	16	6	50	128	1.568
Max Scherzer	9	4	4.01	19	19	0	107.2	98	49	48	23	3	30	121	1.189
Justin Verlander	6	5	3.15	16	16	0	94.1	77	36	33	9	1	31	81	1.145
Carlos Carrasco	3	8	6.80	20	20	0	90.0	115	71	68	18	6	38	66	1.700
José Quintana	3	6	3.57	13	13	0	75.2	75	33	30	5	1	24	60	1.308
Adam Ottavino	1	7	3.21	66	0	12	61.2	46	24	22	7	8	29	62	1.216
Drew Smith	4	6	4.15	62	0	3	56.1	50	31	26	7	5	29	60	1.402
Brooks Raley	1	2	2.80	66	0	3	54.2	44	19	17	4	6	25	61	1.262
Joey Lucchesi	4	0	2.89	9	9	0	46.2	44	17	15	4	2	17	32	1.307
David Robertson	4	2	2.05	40	0	14	44.0	31	13	10	5	2	13	48	1.000
José Butto	1	4	3.64	9	7	0	42.0	33	17	17	3	0	23	38	1.333
Jeff Brigham	1	3	5.26	37	0	0	37.2	26	23	22	9	5	18	42	1.168
Grant Hartwig	5	2	4.84	28	0	0	35.1	34	23	19	3	6	15	30	1.387
Dominic Leone	1	3	4.40	31	0	0	30.2	27	15	15	7	1	11	33	1.239
Trevor Gott	0	2	4.34	34	0	1	29.0	30	15	14	2	2	11	30	1.414
Stephen Nogosek	0	1	5.61	13	0	0	25.2	28	16	16	6	2	14	25	1.636
Phil Bickford	3	2	4.62	25	0	1	25.1	21	14	13	3	4	13	28	1.342
Tommy Hunter	0	1	6.85	14	0	0	23.2	28	20	18	6	2	5	20	1.394
John Curtiss	0	0	4.58	15	0	0	19.2	17	10	10	3	0	8	16	1.271
Denyi Reyes	0	2	7.78	9	3	0	19.2	25	17	17	3	1	8	17	1.678
Reed Garrett	1	0	5.82	9	0	0	17.0	15	11	11	3	1	6	16	1.235
Jimmy Yacabonis	2	1	6.59	7	0	0	13.2	14	10	10	2	1	6	11	1.463
Dennis Santana	1	0	5.91	9	0	0	10.2	10	7	7	2	1	7	12	1.594
Josh Walker	0	1	8.10	14	0	0	10.0	12	11	9	2	0	6	12	1.800
Sean Reid-Foley	0	1	3.52	8	0	0	7.2	4	3	3	0	0	6	16	1.304
Sam Coonrod	0	0	9.45	10	0	0	6.2	5	7	7	0	2	8	6	1.950
Zach Muckenhirn	0	0	6.00	3	0	0	6.0	11	4	4	0	1	2	3	2.167
Adam Kolarek	0	0	0.00	4	0	0	4.2	1	0	0	0	1	1	5	0.429
Vinny Nittoli	0	0	2.45	3	0	0	3.2	4	1	1	0	1	0	3	1.091
Anthony Kay	0	0	5.40	3	0	0	3.1	1	2	2	1	1	1	3	0.600
Edwin Uceta	0	0	0.00	1	0	0	3.0	0	0	0	0	1	2	3	0.667
Danny Mendick	0	0	36.00	2	0	0	2.0	9	8	8	2	0	0	0	4.500
Tyson Miller	1	0	0.00	1	0	0	2.0	0	0	0	0	0	2	0	1.000
T.J. McFarland	0	1	5.40	3	0	0	1.2	4	2	1	0	1	1	2	3.000
Luis Guillorme	0	0	0.00	1	0	0	1.0	1	0	0	0	0	0	0	1.000
Team totals	75	87	4.30	162	162	34	1416.1	1331	729	676	190	85	595	1397	1.360
Rank in 15 NL teams	12	4	9	—	—	14	14	6	9	9	8	14	13	6	10

Source:Baseball Reference

== Farm system ==
Level	Team	League	Manager
AAA	Syracuse Mets	International League	Dick Scott
AA	Binghamton Rumble Ponies	Eastern League	Reid Brignac
High-A	Brooklyn Cyclones	South Atlantic League	Chris Newell
Low-A	St. Lucie Mets	Florida State League	Gilbert Gómez
Rookie	FCL Mets	Florida Complex League	Jay Pecci
Rookie	DSL Mets 1	Dominican Summer League	Danny Ortega
Rookie	DSL Mets 2	Dominican Summer League	Danny Ortega
