= Ronny Mauricio =

Dominican baseball player (born 2001)

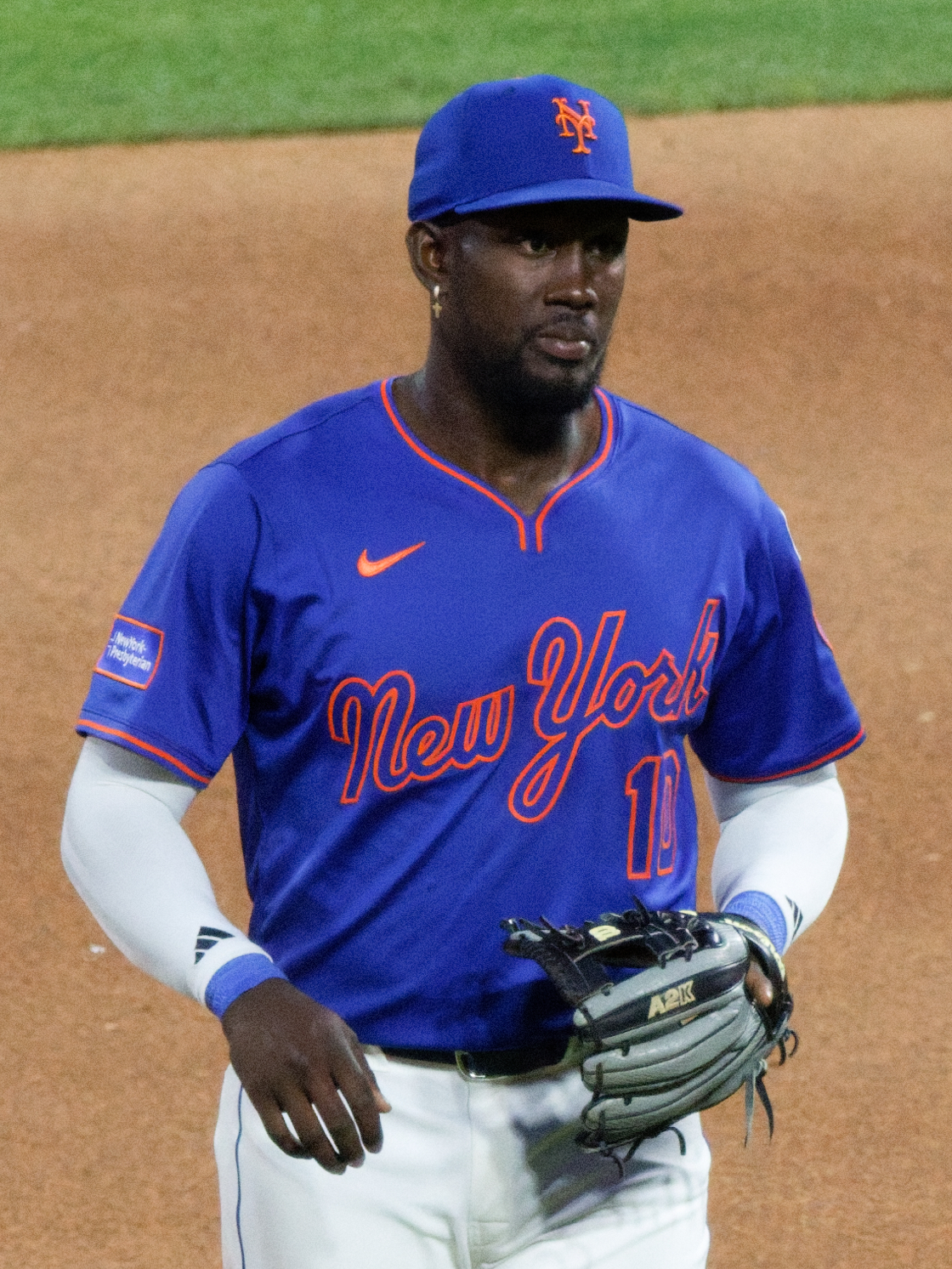
- Mauricio with the Mets in 2025

New York Mets – No. 0
- Infielder
- Born: April 4, 2001 (age 25); San Pedro de Macorís, Dominican Republic
- Bats: Switch Throws: Right

MLB debut
- September 1, 2023, for the New York Mets

MLB statistics (through 2026 season)
- Batting average: .232
- Home runs: 12
- Runs batted in: 27
- Stats at Baseball Reference

Teams
- New York Mets (2023, 2025–present)

Ronny Mauricio (born April 4, 2001) is a Dominican professional baseball infielder for the New York Mets of Major League Baseball (MLB). He made his MLB debut in 2023.

== Career ==
=== Minor leagues ===
Mauricio signed with the New York Mets as an international free agent in July 2017 and received a signing bonus of $2.1 million (equivalent to $2.8 million in 2025), a team record. He spent his first professional season in 2018 with the Gulf Coast League Mets and Kingsport Mets, slashing .273/.304/.410 with three home runs and 35 RBIs over 57 games.

Mauricio spent 2019 with the Columbia Fireflies with whom he was named a South Atlantic League All-Star. Over 116 games, he batted .268/.307/.357 with 4 home runs and 37 RBIs. He did not play a minor league game in 2020 due to the cancellation of the minor league season because of the COVID-19 pandemic.

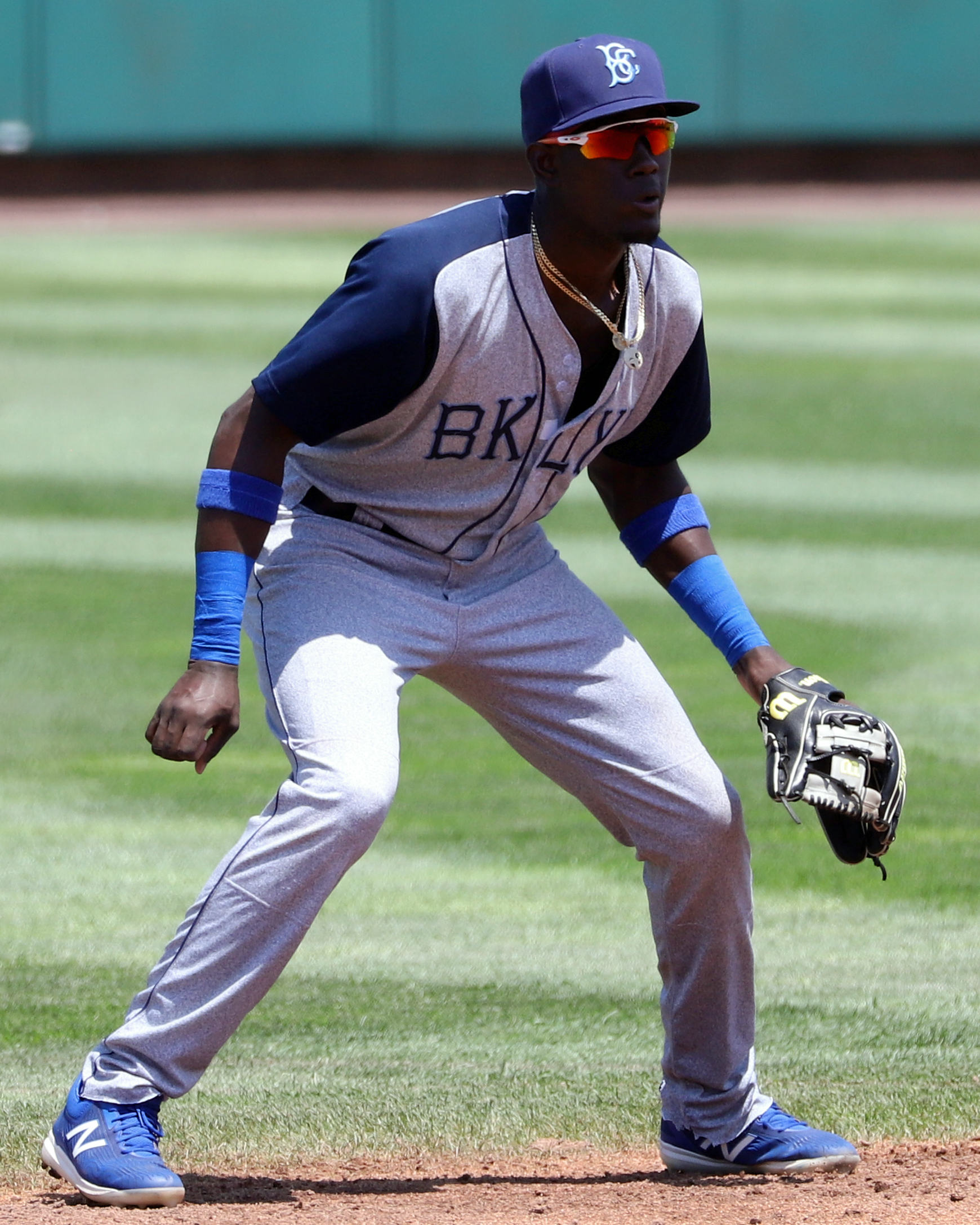
Mauricio with the Brooklyn Cyclones in 2021

In 2021, Mauricio split the season between the Brooklyn Cyclones and the Binghamton Rumble Ponies, slashing .248/.296/.449 with twenty home runs, 64 RBIs, and 11 stolen bases over 108 games. He was selected to the 40-man roster following the season on November 19, 2021.

Mauricio was optioned to the Triple-A Syracuse Mets to begin the 2023 season. In 116 games for Triple–A Syracuse, he batted .292/.346/.506 with 23 home runs, 71 RBI, and 24 stolen bases.

=== Major leagues ===
On September 1, 2023, Mauricio was promoted to the major leagues for the first time and made his Major League debut against the Seattle Mariners. His first Major League hit was a double to right field off pitcher Logan Gilbert. It was struck so solidly (117.3 MPH) off the bat that it was the hardest-hit ball by a Mets player in more than two years. It was also the hardest-hit first career hit by any player to debut since Statcast began tracking balls in 2015. The prior record was held by Luis Robert Jr. at 115.8 MPH. On September 12, Mauricio hit his first Major League home run, clocking in at 112.4 MPH off the bat, against the Arizona Diamondbacks. The two-run, 440-foot blast deep to right field was off of pitcher Ryne Nelson, leading the Mets to a 7–4 victory. In 26 games for the Mets in his debut campaign, he batted .248/.296/.347 with 2 home runs, 9 RBI, and 7 stolen bases.

Before the 2023 offseason, the Mets asked Mauricio not to play in the Dominican Winter League and to rest instead. It was later reported that he was in dire financial straits and could not afford not to play. On December 12, 2023, Mauricio had suffered a torn ACL while playing for the Tigres del Licey and would require surgery. On January 3, 2024, the Mets announced that he would be ruled out for the entire 2024 season.

On June 3, 2025, after months of recovering from his injury, the Mets promoted Mauricio back up to the major leagues. During his rehab assignment, he slashed .515/.564/.818, a 1.382 OPS, and three home runs in nine games for the Triple-A Syracuse Mets. Mauricio made his season debut the same day against the Los Angeles Dodgers at Dodger Stadium, going 0-for-4 with no walks and a strikeout as the Mets lost the game 6–5 in extra innings. On June 7, during a game against the Colorado Rockies, Mauricio hit his first home run since 2023, a 456-foot solo shot to right field off of pitcher Germán Márquez. The ball had an exit velocity of 110.3 MPH and was the furthest homer a Met hit up to that point in the 2025 season. His first career four-hit game was achieved on July 27 against the San Francisco Giants in a 5–3 victory. Mauricio made 61 total appearances for the Mets in 2025, batting .226/.293/.369 with six home runs, 10 RBI, and four stolen bases.

Mauricio was optioned to Triple-A Syracuse to begin the 2026 season. He was called up on April 6, 2026, after Juan Soto was placed on the injured list. The following day, in his first major league at-bat of the season, he logged his first career walk-off hit against the Arizona Diamondbacks. On April 13, the Mets optioned Mauricio to Syracuse to make active roster space for Tommy Pham. He was recalled on April 23 after Francisco Lindor was placed on the injured list. However, Mauricio himself landed on the injured list on May 3. He was recalled on June 24, and immediately optioned back to Triple-A. However, he was recalled the next day due to an injury to Marcus Semien.
