= Tylor Megill =

American baseball player (born 1995)

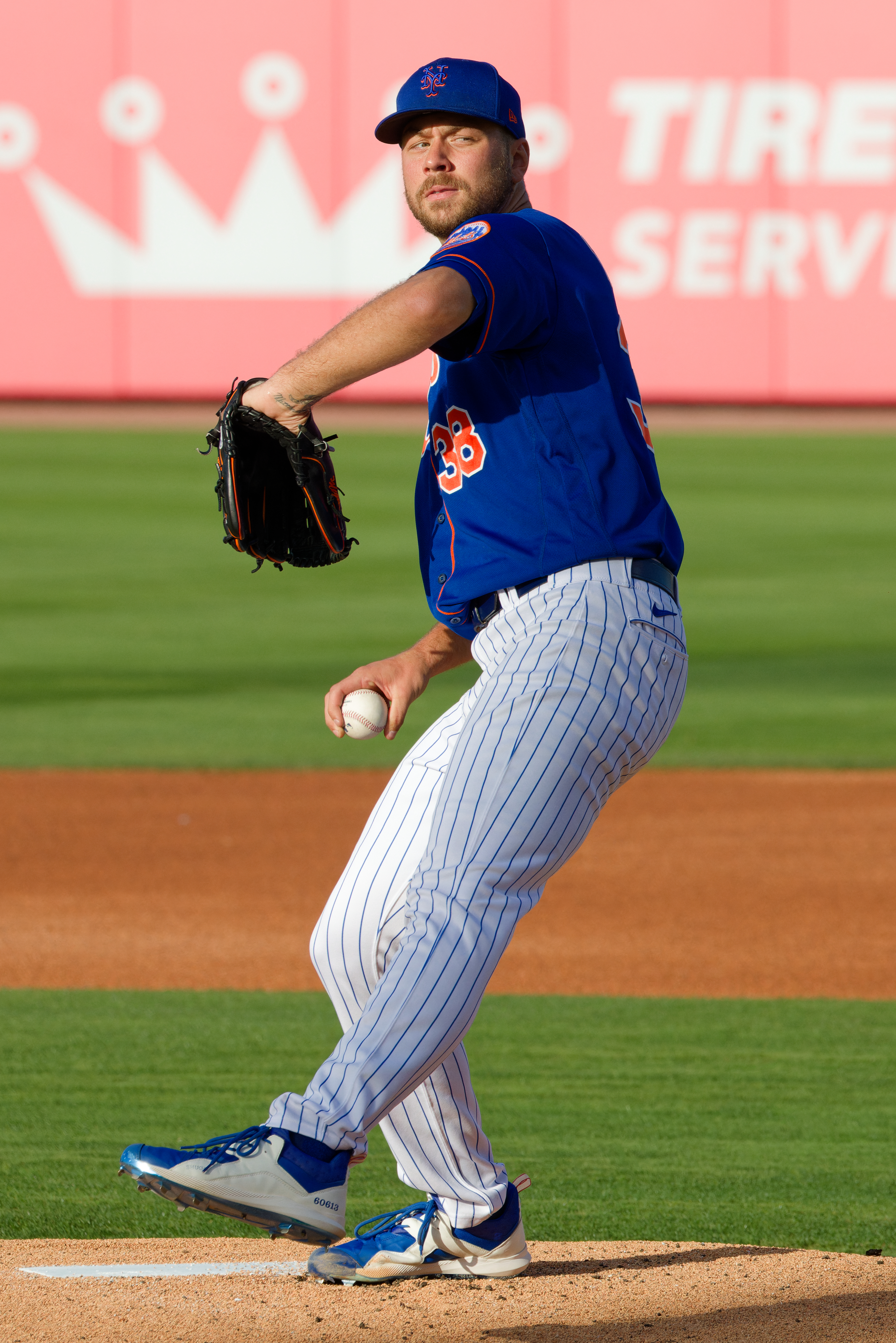
- Megill with the New York Mets in 2023

New York Mets – No. 58
- Pitcher
- Born: July 28, 1995 (age 31); Long Beach, California, U.S.
- Bats: Right Throws: Right

MLB debut
- June 23, 2021, for the New York Mets

MLB statistics (through 2025 season)
- Win–loss record: 26–26
- Earned run average: 4.46
- Strikeouts: 435
- Stats at Baseball Reference

Teams
- New York Mets (2021–2025)

Career highlights and awards
- Pitched a combined no-hitter on April 29, 2022

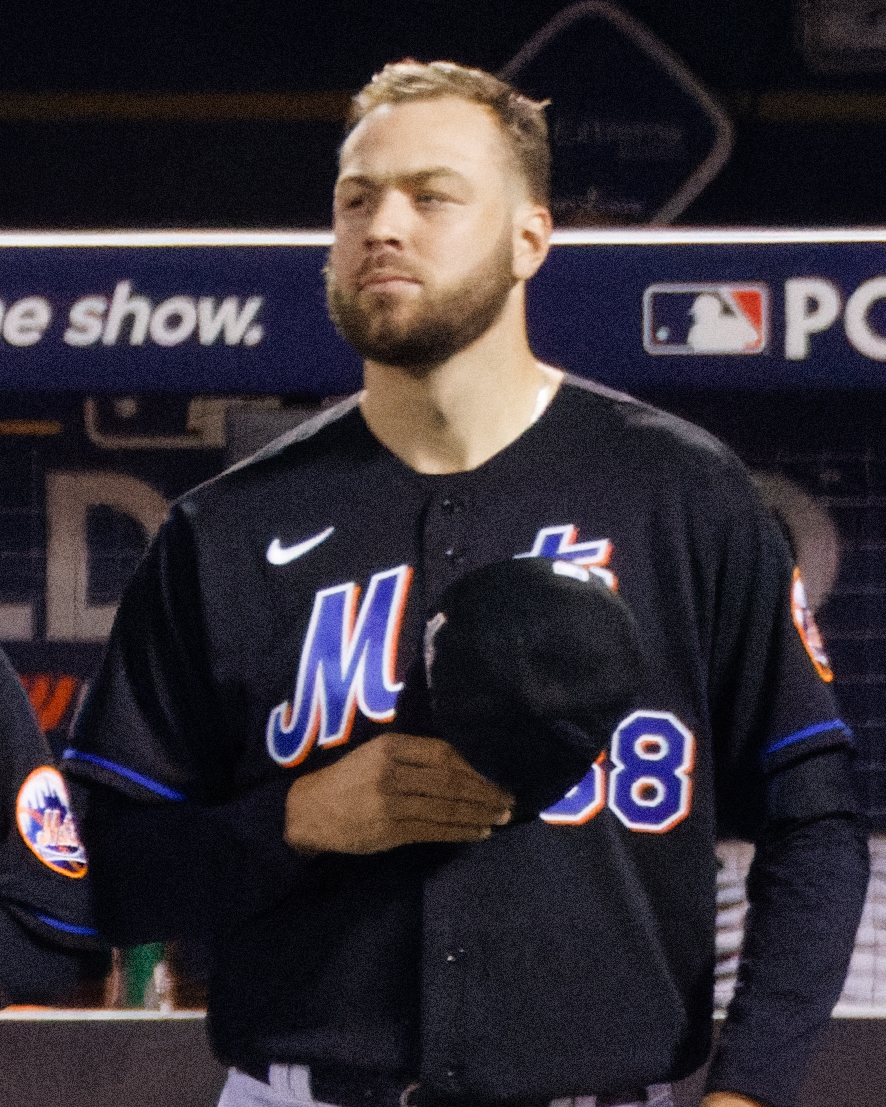
Megill with the Mets in 2022

Tylor J. Megill (born July 28, 1995) is an American professional baseball pitcher for the New York Mets of Major League Baseball (MLB). He made his MLB debut in 2021. Megill pitched five innings of a combined no-hitter on April 29, 2022.

== Early life ==
Megill was born on July 28, 1995, in Long Beach, California, to Julie and Kevin Megill. He attended Los Alamitos High School where he was a pitcher on their baseball team.

== College career ==
Undrafted in the 2014 Major League Baseball draft, he enrolled at Loyola Marymount University where he played college baseball. In 2015, his freshman year, he pitched 57 innings, going 6–3 with a 3.95 ERA. After that season, he transferred to Cypress College where he spent 2016, and went 11–3 with a 3.72 ERA over 17 games (16 starts). Following the season, he transferred once again, this time to the University of Arizona. In 2017, his junior year, he pitched to a 2–3 record and a 5.55 ERA over 35 2/3 innings, mainly in relief. As a senior in 2018, he went 1–3 with a 4.73 ERA over 32 1/3 innings, striking out 38 and collecting six saves.

== Professional career ==
=== Draft and minor leagues ===
The New York Mets selected Megill in the eighth round of the 2018 Major League Baseball draft. Megill signed with the Mets and made his professional debut with the Brooklyn Cyclones, going 1–2 with a 3.21 ERA over 28 relief innings. In 2019, he began the season with the Columbia Fireflies and earned promotions to the St. Lucie Mets and the Binghamton Rumble Ponies during the year. Over 22 games (11 starts) between the three clubs, Megill went 6–7 with a 3.52 ERA, striking out 92 batters over 71 1/3 innings.

Megill did not play in a game in 2020 due to the cancellation of the minor league season because of the COVID-19 pandemic. He returned to Binghamton, now members of the Double-A Northeast League to begin 2021. After pitching to a 3.12 ERA over 26 innings with Binghamton, he was promoted to the Syracuse Mets of the Triple-A East League on June 1.

=== Major leagues ===
On June 23, 2021, Megill was selected to the 40-man roster and promoted to the major leagues for the first time. He made his first major league start against the Atlanta Braves that day and pitched 4 innings, giving up three hits and two earned runs (one home run allowed) with two walks and four strikeouts on 92 pitches. He earned a no-decision as the Mets won the game by a score of 7–3. On July 23, Megill earned his first major league win after pitching six shutout innings against the Toronto Blue Jays. In the game, he also collected his first career hit, a single off of Blue Jays starter Steven Matz. Megill started a total of 18 games for the Mets, pitching to a 4–6 record, a 4.52 ERA, and 99 strikeouts over 89 2/3 innings.

At the start of the 2022 season, Megill was named the team's Opening Day starter due to injuries of Jacob deGrom and Max Scherzer. He was described in the New York Post as "maybe the most unlikely" Opening Day starter in Mets history. On April 29, 2022, Megill threw the first five innings of a combined no-hitter against the Philadelphia Phillies. On May 15, he was placed on the injured list with right biceps inflammation. Megill returned from the IL in September as a relief pitcher and struggled in his appearances out of the bullpen. He was placed on the COVID-19 injured list shortly before the final game of the regular season and two days before the start of the NL Wild Card Series against the San Diego Padres, in which the Mets lost in three games. In 15 games for the Mets in 2022, Megill posted a 4–2 record, a 5.13 ERA, and 51 strikeouts across 47^{1}/_{3} innings pitched.

Megill was optioned to Triple-A Syracuse to begin the 2023 season. On May 1, 2023, Megill hit Atlanta Braves outfielder Ronald Acuña Jr. in the 1st inning to start the second game of a doubleheader. Acuña was forced to leave the game with a left shoulder contusion. In 25 games for the Mets in 2023, Megill posted a 9–8 record, a 4.70 ERA, and 105 strikeouts across 126^{1}/_{3} innings pitched, setting a new career-high.

Megill was named the Mets' fifth starter entering the 2024 season after beating out José Buttó in spring training. On August 2, 2024, Megill was sent to Triple-A as Paul Blackburn made his first start for the Mets; in which he was previously used in the bullpen for the July 31 game against the Minnesota Twins. However, Megill was called back up ahead of the August 30 game against the Chicago White Sox. On that night, he struck out 6 batters allowing one run, five hits, and one walk in 5^{1}/_{3} innings, earning his first win since June 16.

On September 30, Megill started the first game of a doubleheader against the Atlanta Braves, striking out 8 batters and allowing 3 earned runs on 8 hits over 5^{2}/_{3} innings in an 8–7 victory that clinched the Mets a spot in the 2024 postseason. In 16 games for the Mets in 2024, he posted a 4–5 record, a 4.04 ERA, and 91 strikeouts across 78 innings pitched. In the National League Division Series against the Philadelphia Phillies, Megill pitched in relief in Game 2, giving up a walk-off single in the 9th inning to Nick Castellanos in a 7–6 loss. Megill also pitched the final three innings of Game 3 of the National League Championship Series against the Los Angeles Dodgers. He gave up a three-run home run to Shohei Ohtani and a solo shot to Max Muncy in the Mets' 8–0 loss. Across 2 games of the postseason, Megill struggled as he posted a 10.38 ERA and 5 strikeouts across 4^{1}/_{3} innings pitched.

On June 17, 2025, Megill was placed on the 15-day injured list with a right elbow strain. Megill had produced mixed results up to this point, posting a 3.95 ERA. He was transferred to the 60-day injured list on July 8. While on the 60-day injured list, Megill started his rehab with Double-A Binghamton. After a bad start on September 8, Megill was shut down after experiencing tightness in his right arm. After the injury, he consulted doctors in Los Angeles on September 21 to confirm whether he needed Tommy John surgery. He received Tommy John surgery on his right elbow two days later and was slated to miss the remainder of 2025 as well as the entirety of the 2026 season.

== Personal life ==
Megill's older brother, Trevor, is also a pitcher in Major League Baseball.

Awards and achievements
Preceded by Corbin Burnes; Josh Hader	No-hitter pitcher April 29, 2022 (with Drew Smith, Joely Rodríguez, Seth Lugo & Edwin Díaz)	Succeeded by Reid Detmers
