= Landon Marceaux =

American baseball player (born 1999)

- Pitcher
- Born: October 8, 1999 (age 25); Metairie, Louisiana, U.S.
- Bats: Right Throws: Right
Medals
Men's baseball
Representing United States
U-18 Baseball World Cup
Gold medal – first place	2017 Thunder Bay	Team

Landon Joel Marceaux (born October 8, 1999) is an American former professional baseball pitcher.

== Amateur career ==
Marceaux attended Destrehan High School in Destrehan, Louisiana, where he played baseball. As a junior in 2017, he pitched to a 1.56 ERA and 99 strikeouts over 62 2/3 innings. That summer, he played for USA Baseball on their U-18 team that won a gold medal at the U-18 Baseball World Cup. As a senior in 2018, he went 5–0 with a 1.26 ERA, five walks, and 76 strikeouts over 49 2/3 innings. He was ranked a top-40 draft prospect by Major League Baseball, and received an offer for $1.5 million from the Kansas City Royals as their third round selection in the 2018 Major League Baseball draft, but declined. He was then selected by the New York Yankees in the 37th round of the draft but did not sign and instead enrolled at Louisiana State University to play college baseball for the LSU Tigers.

Marceaux was inserted into LSU's starting rotation as a freshman in 2019 and made 14 starts on the year. He finished the season 5–2 with a 4.66 ERA and 43 strikeouts over 58 innings pitched. During his sophomore year in 2020, he went 2–0 with a 2.70 ERA over four starts before the remainder of the college baseball season was cancelled due to the COVID-19 pandemic. As a junior in 2021, he opened the season with 33 2/3 innings in which he did not give up an earned run. He finished the season having started 17 games and went 7–7 with a 2.54 ERA and 116 strikeouts over 102 2/3 innings.

== Professional career ==
=== Los Angeles Angels ===
Marceaux was drafted by the Los Angeles Angels in the third round with the 80th overall selection in the 2021 Major League Baseball draft. He signed with the team for $767,800.

Marceaux made his professional debut that season with the rookie-level Arizona Complex League Angels, giving up six earned runs over 3 2/3 innings. He opened the 2022 season with the Tri-City Dust Devils and was promoted to the Rocket City Trash Pandas in early August. Over 18 starts between the two teams, he went 4–6 with a 2.98 ERA and 73 strikeouts over 90 2/3 innings. He returned to Rocket City to open the 2023 season.

=== New York Mets ===
On June 23, 2023, the Angels traded Marceaux and Coleman Crow to the New York Mets in exchange for Eduardo Escobar. He played with the Florida Complex League Mets, St. Lucie Mets, and Binghamton Rumble Ponies before being placed on the injured list in August, ending his season. Over 18 starts for the 2023 season, Marceaux went 3-9 with a 5.50 ERA and 59 strikeouts over 75 1/3 innings. Marceaux did not appear in a game in 2024 after suffering an injury prior to the season.

=== Kansas City Royals ===
On December 11, 2024, Marceaux was selected by the Kansas City Royals in the minor league phase of the Rule 5 draft. He made two starts for the rookie-level Arizona Complex League Royals, struggling to a 14.73 ERA with five strikeouts across 3 2/3 innings pitched. On May 16, 2025, Marceaux retired from professional baseball.
