= Coleman Crow =

American baseball player (born 2000)

Milwaukee Brewers – No. 57
- Pitcher
- Born: December 30, 2000 (age 25); Concord, Georgia, U.S.
- Bats: Right Throws: Right

MLB debut
- April 17, 2026, for the Milwaukee Brewers

MLB statistics (through 2026 season)
- Win–loss record: 0–1
- Earned run average: 5.30
- Strikeouts: 10
- Stats at Baseball Reference

Teams
- Milwaukee Brewers (2026–present)

Coleman McCade Crow (born December 30, 2000) is an American professional baseball pitcher for the Milwaukee Brewers of Major League Baseball (MLB). He made his MLB debut in 2026.

== Career ==
=== Los Angeles Angels ===
Crow attended Pike County High School in Zebulon, Georgia. He was drafted by the Los Angeles Angels in the 28th round of the 2019 Major League Baseball draft. He made his professional debut in 2021 with the Inland Empire 66ers and played in the Arizona Fall League after the season.

Crow started 2022 with the Double-A Rocket City Trash Pandas and returned there to start 2023. In four games for Rocket City, he registered a 1.88 ERA with 31 strikeouts across 24innings of work. On April 26, 2023, he was placed on the injured list with right elbow inflammation.

On June 23, 2023, the Angels traded Crow and Landon Marceaux to the New York Mets in exchange for Eduardo Escobar. On August 11, Crow underwent Tommy John surgery, ruling him out for the rest of the year and putting his 2024 season in jeopardy.

=== Milwaukee Brewers ===
On December 20, 2023, the Mets traded Crow to the Milwaukee Brewers in exchange for Adrian Houser and Tyrone Taylor. He returned to action in 2025 with the Double-A Biloxi Shuckers and Triple-A Nashville Sounds, accumulating a 4–1 recorded and 3.24 ERA with 64 strikeouts over 50 innings of work. The Brewers added Crow to their 40-man roster on November 3, 2025, preventing him from reaching minor league free agency.

Crow was optioned to Triple-A Nashville to begin the 2026 season. On April 17, 2026, Crow was promoted to the major leagues for the first time.
