= Eduardo Escobar =

Venezuelan baseball player (born 1989)

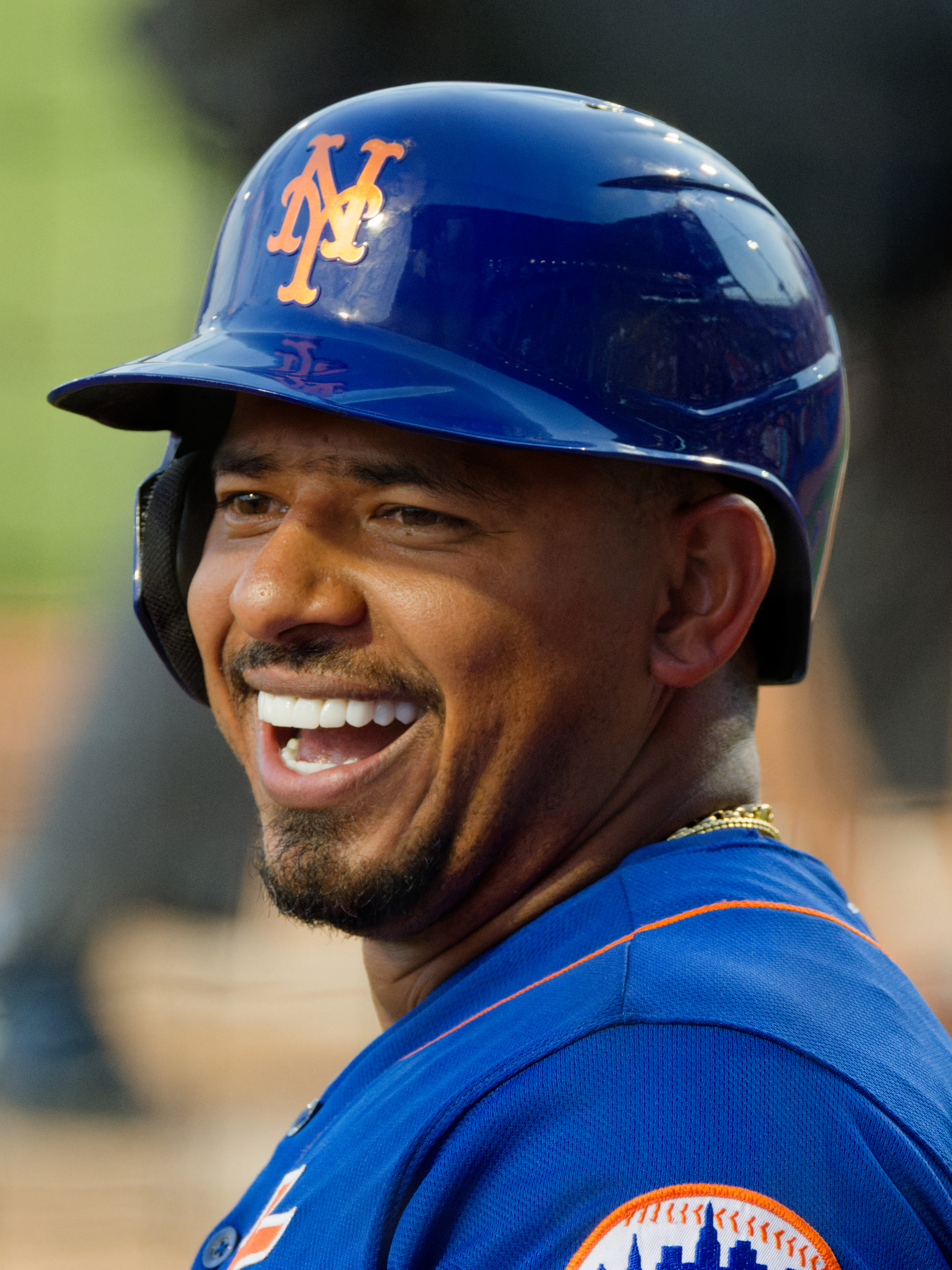
- Escobar with the New York Mets in 2023

Centauros de La Guaira – No. 5
- Infielder
- Born: January 5, 1989 (age 37); Villa de Cura, Venezuela
- Bats: Switch Throws: Right

MLB debut
- September 2, 2011, for the Chicago White Sox

MLB statistics (through 2023 season)
- Batting average: .253
- Hits: 1,185
- Home runs: 164
- Runs batted in: 636
- Stats at Baseball Reference

Teams
- Chicago White Sox (2011–2012); Minnesota Twins (2012–2018); Arizona Diamondbacks (2018–2021); Milwaukee Brewers (2021); New York Mets (2022–2023); Los Angeles Angels (2023)

Career highlights and awards
- All-Star (2021)

Eduardo José Escobar (born January 5, 1989) is a Venezuelan-American professional baseball third baseman for the Centauros de La Guaira of the Venezuelan Major League. He has previously played in Major League Baseball (MLB) for the Chicago White Sox, Minnesota Twins, Arizona Diamondbacks, Milwaukee Brewers, New York Mets, and Los Angeles Angels.

== Early life ==
Escobar grew up in the neighborhood of La Pica in Palo Negro in the Venezuelan state of Aragua with his four siblings. They were raised by a single mother. Escobar began working a job at seven years old and was only able to get an education through the eighth grade.

== Professional career ==
=== Chicago White Sox ===
Escobar was a September call-up in 2011, playing in nine games and had two hits in seven at bats. In 2012, Escobar made the 25-man roster out of spring training as a utility infielder. In his first 97 plate appearances of 2012, Escobar had a .207 batting average with three runs batted in (RBIs).

=== Minnesota Twins ===
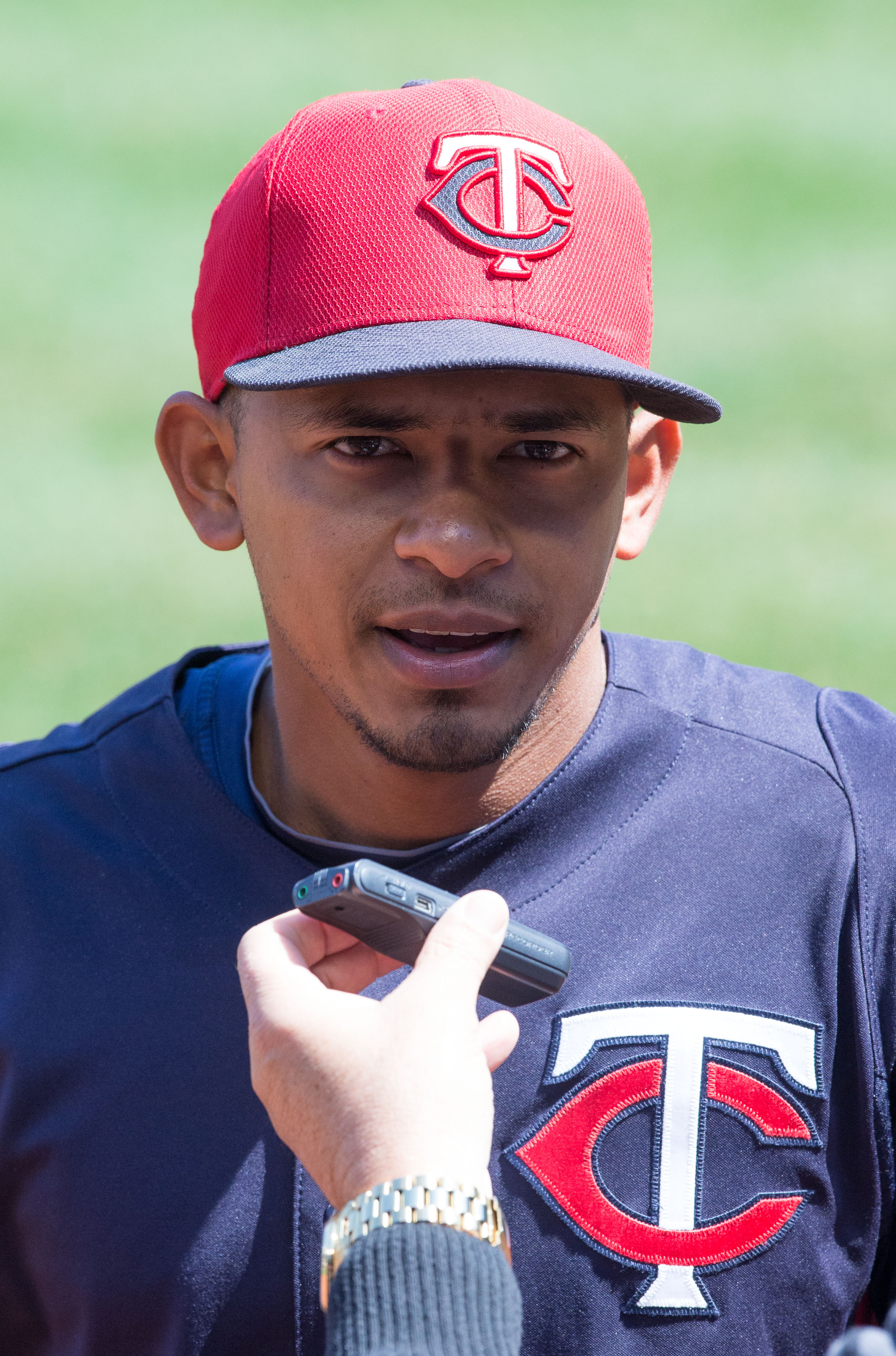
Escobar with the Twins in 2013

On July 28, 2012, Escobar was traded to the Minnesota Twins with Pedro Hernández for Francisco Liriano. In 49 more plate appearances, Escobar batted .227 with six RBIs. Overall in 2012, Escobar had 146 total plate appearances with a .214 average and nine RBIs.

On April 3, 2013, Escobar hit a walk-off 2-run double off of Phil Coke that lifted the Twins past the Detroit Tigers, 3–2, to its first win of the 2013 season. On April 9, Escobar hit his first career home run in the top of the 5th inning off of Jeremy Guthrie of the Kansas City Royals. Playing 66 games in 2013, Escobar batted .236 with three home runs, and 10 RBIs.

In 2014, Escobar batted .275 and hit six home runs with 37 RBIs in 133 games. In 2015, he played 127 games batting .262 with 12 home runs and 58 RBIs. In 2016, he played 105 games batting .236 with 6 home runs and 37 RBIs.

On May 7, 2016, Escobar was placed on the 15-day disabled list due to a left groin strain. He avoided salary arbitration with the Twins on December 3, 2016, by agreeing to a one-year, $2.6 million contract for the 2017 season. In 2017, Escobar batted .254 and set career highs with 21 home runs and 73 RBIs.

=== Arizona Diamondbacks ===
On July 27, 2018, Escobar was traded to the Arizona Diamondbacks for minor leaguers Gabriel Maciel, Jhoan Durán, and Ernie De La Trinidad. He had the highest fielding percentage among major league third basemen, at .983.

On October 23, 2018, the Diamondbacks signed Escobar to a three-year contract worth a reported $21 million. In the 2019 season, he hit 35 home runs and 118 RBIs, batting .269/.320/.511. He also led the majors with 10 triples. In 2020, Escobar struggled offensively throughout the shortened MLB season, hitting just .212 with four home runs and 20 RBIs. Escobar bounced back strongly in 2021, posting a .246 average with 22 home runs and 65 RBI's in 98 games with the Diamondbacks and earning a trip to the 2021 Major League Baseball All-Star Game.

=== Milwaukee Brewers ===
On July 28, 2021, Escobar was traded to the Milwaukee Brewers in exchange for Cooper Hummel and Alberto Ciprian. On October 2, Escobar collected his 1,000th hit.

=== New York Mets ===
On December 1, 2021, Escobar signed a two-year, $20 million contract with the New York Mets.

On June 6, 2022, Escobar hit for the cycle in an 11–5 win over the San Diego Padres, becoming the 11th player in Mets history to accomplish the feat, and the first since Scott Hairston in 2012. He also became the first player to hit for the cycle at Petco Park. Escobar was named National League Payer of the Month for September, after slashing .340/.393/.650 with 8 home runs, 4 doubles, and 24 RBI across 26 games that month. It was the first time he earned Player of the Month in his career. Escobar played in 136 games for the Mets in 2022, batting .240/.295/.430 with 20 home runs and 69 RBI.

On October 7, 2022, Escobar hit the first and only postseason home run of his career, a solo shot to center field off of Yu Darvish of the San Diego Padres in Game 1 of the NL Wild Card Series.

=== Los Angeles Angels ===
On June 23, 2023, the Mets traded Escobar to the Los Angeles Angels for pitching prospects Landon Marceaux and Coleman Crow. He was acquired by the team in the wake of several injuries to its infielders, including third basemen Anthony Rendon and Gio Urshela. Escobar made his team debut on June 24 against the Colorado Rockies at Coors Field, going 2-for-4 at the plate with a walk, RBI, and four runs scored before being substituted in the fifth inning of a 25–1 blowout win. On June 26, he was away from the team to take the American Civics Test for U.S. citizenship. Between the Mets and Angels, Escobar finished the 2023 season batting .226 with six home runs and 31 RBIs in 99 games. On November 3, the Angels declined the $9 million team option on Escobar's contract, making him a free agent.

=== Toronto Blue Jays ===
On February 16, 2024, Escobar signed a minor league contract with the Toronto Blue Jays. He was released by Toronto on March 22, after being informed that he would not make the Opening Day roster.

=== Centauros de La Guaira ===
In 2025, Escobar signed with the Centauros de La Guaira of the Venezuelan Major League. In 40 games he batted .273/.343/.442 with 5 home runs and 24 RBIs.

In 2026, Escobar returned for a second season with La Guaira. In 48 games he batted .296/.405/.533 with 9 home runs and 34 RBIs.

== Personal life ==
Escobar owns a home in Miami and resides there in the offseason with his wife and five children. As of June 2021, his family was living with him in Arizona. He had four boys and a daughter. As of 2021, the oldest, his daughter, was 17 years old and the youngest was six years old.

Escobar is afraid of cats. During his time with the Arizona Diamondbacks, teammates pranked him by startling him with a stuffed cat which gradually became the team's good luck charm.

Escobar frequents the Brazilian steakhouse chain Fogo de Chão. He has taken teammates and team employees to different locations throughout the country. While with the Minnesota Twins in 2018, he told reporters that his power at the plate came from "a lot of Fogo de Chão." The Milwaukee Journal Sentinel reported in 2021 that Escobar would shout "Fogo power" after hitting home runs. On the tenth anniversary of his major league debut, the business donated $10,000 to his charity in the form of an oversized check.

In June 2023, Escobar became a U.S. citizen.

== See also ==
- Arizona Diamondbacks award winners and league leaders
- List of Major League Baseball annual triples leaders
- List of Major League Baseball players from Venezuela
- List of Major League Baseball players to hit for the cycle

Achievements
Preceded by Christian Yelich	Hitting for the cycle June 6, 2022	Succeeded by Jared Walsh
