= Drew Smith (baseball) =

American baseball player (born 1993)

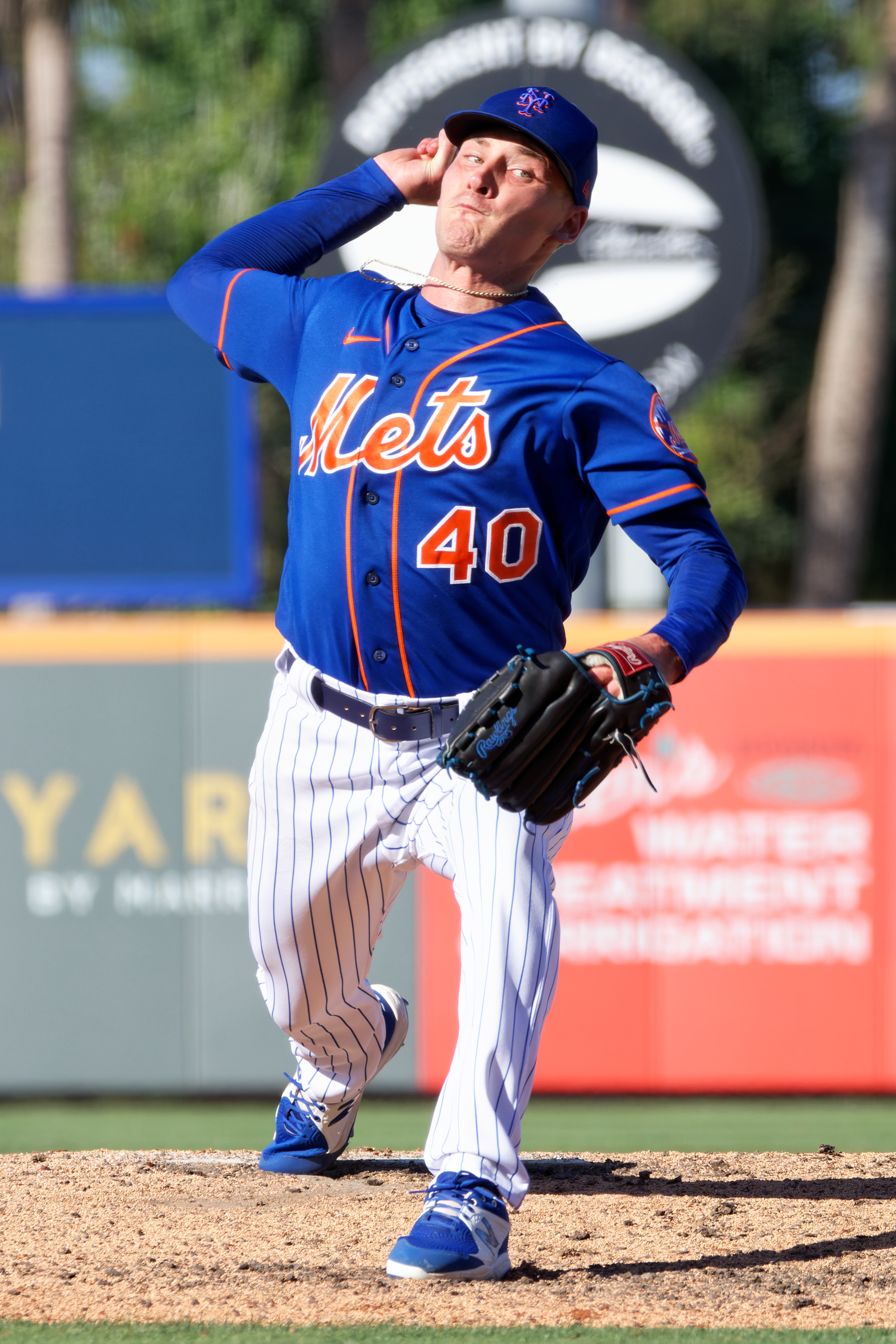
- Smith with the Mets in 2023

Free agent
- Pitcher
- Born: September 24, 1993 (age 32); Fort Worth, Texas, U.S.
- Bats: Right Throws: Right

MLB debut
- June 23, 2018, for the New York Mets

MLB statistics (through 2024 season)
- Win–loss record: 12–13
- Earned-run average: 3.48
- Strikeouts: 202
- Stats at Baseball Reference

Teams
- New York Mets (2018, 2020–2024)

Career highlights and awards
- Pitched a combined no-hitter on April 29, 2022

Andrew David Smith (born September 24, 1993) is an American professional baseball pitcher who is a free agent. He has previously played in Major League Baseball (MLB) for the New York Mets. He made his MLB debut in 2018.

== Amateur career ==
Smith graduated from Crowley High School in Crowley, Texas in 2012. In 2011, as a junior at Crowley, he was 10–1 with a 1.90 ERA in 85 innings. Undrafted out of high school in the 2012 Major League Baseball draft, he enrolled at Dallas Baptist University where he played college baseball for the Dallas Baptist Patriots. As a junior at Dallas Baptist in 2015, Smith compiled a 3–2 record and 3.97 ERA in 25 appearances for the Patriots.

== Professional career ==
=== Detroit Tigers ===
The Detroit Tigers selected Smith in the third round of the 2015 Major League Baseball draft. He signed with Detroit for $575,800 and was assigned to the Gulf Coast League Tigers. After one appearance in the GCL, Smith was promoted to the Connecticut Tigers. He was promoted to the West Michigan Whitecaps in August and he finished the season there. In 31 relief innings pitched between the three clubs, Smith was 3–0 with a 0.29 ERA. In 2016, he returned to West Michigan and spent the whole season there, going 1–2 with a 2.96 ERA in 35 relief appearances. He began 2017 with the Lakeland Flying Tigers.

=== Tampa Bay Rays ===
On April 28, 2017, the Tigers traded Smith to the Tampa Bay Rays as the player to be named later in the Mikie Mahtook trade. Tampa Bay assigned him to the Charlotte Stone Crabs. He was promoted to the Durham Bulls for one game in early July before returning to Charlotte. On July 18, he was promoted to the Montgomery Biscuits.

=== New York Mets ===
On July 27, 2017, the Rays traded Smith to the New York Mets in exchange for Lucas Duda. The Mets assigned him to the Binghamton Rumble Ponies and he finished the season there. In 42 relief appearances between Lakeland, Charlotte, Durham, Montgomery, and Binghamton, Smith pitched to a 4–4 record with a 1.65 ERA and 0.90 WHIP. He began 2018 with Binghamton and was promoted to the Las Vegas 51s after two games.

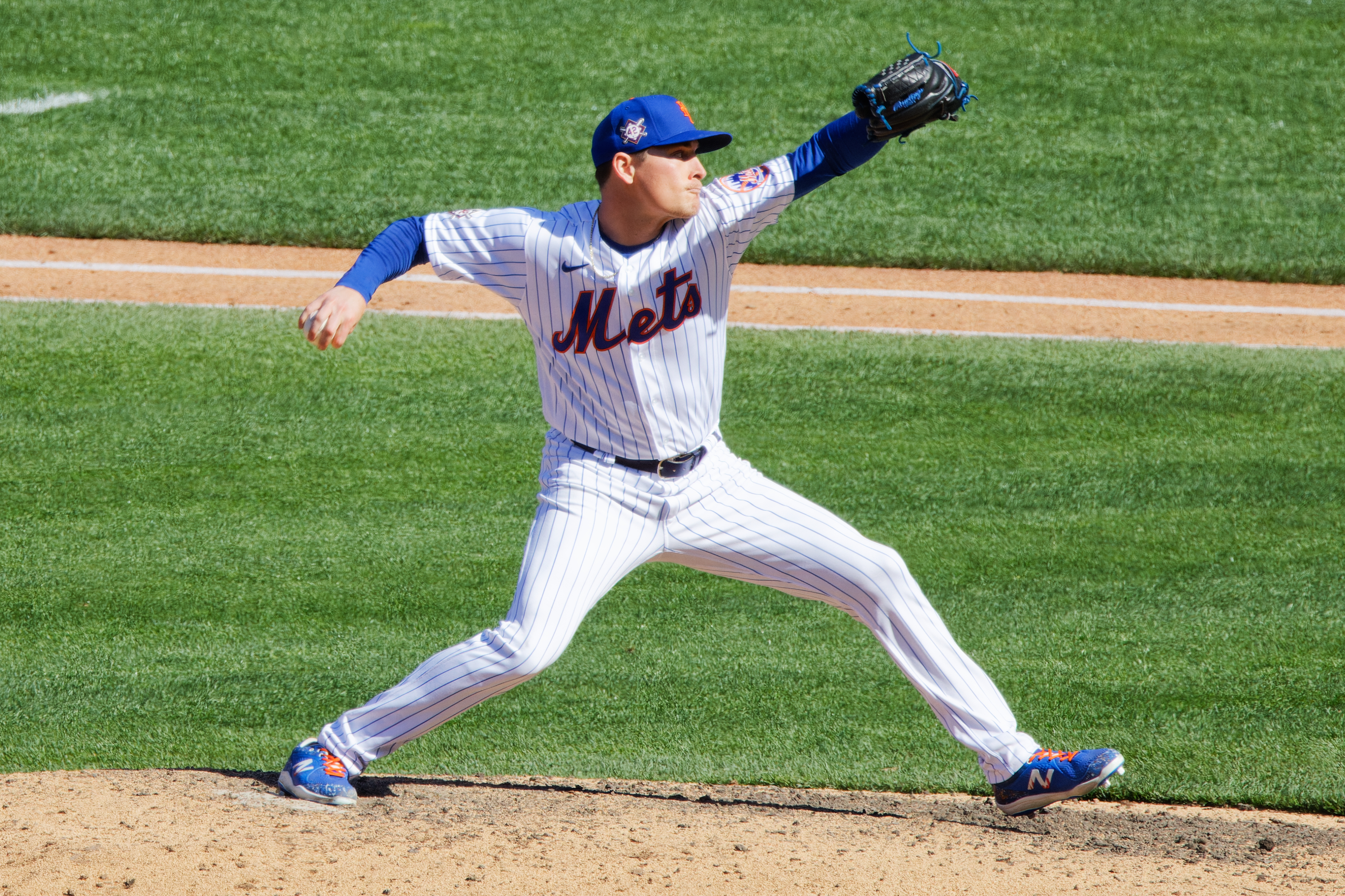
Smith pitching for the Mets in 2022

The Mets promoted Smith to the major leagues on June 22, 2018. He made his major league debut the next night at Citi Field against the Los Angeles Dodgers, pitching one scoreless inning in relief as the Dodgers defeated New York 8–3. He finished his 2018 season with the Mets, going 1–1 with a 3.54 ERA in 27 relief appearances. Smith underwent Tommy John surgery during 2019 spring training, forcing him to miss the year.

Smith returned to game action in 2020, appearing in 8 games for the Mets, registering a 6.43 ERA with seven strikeouts in as many innings pitched. In 2021, although he missed time due to injury, Smith still made 30 relief appearances for the Mets, going 3–1 with a 2.40 ERA and 41 strikeouts over 41 1/3 innings.

On April 29, 2022, Smith pitched in relief in a combined no-hitter against the Philadelphia Phillies, pitching 1 1/3 innings. He made 44 appearances for the Mets in 2022, compiling a 3.33 ERA with 53 strikeouts across 46 innings of work.

Smith earned his first major league save in a game against the Washington Nationals, pitching 1/3 inning, on May 12, 2023. On June 13, Smith was ejected upon entering a game against the New York Yankees after a sticky-substance check. He was suspended 10 games and fined by MLB the following day. Smith made 62 relief outings for New York in 2023, registering a 4–6 record and 4.15 ERA with 60 strikeouts and 3 saves across 56 1/3 innings pitched.

Smith began the 2024 campaign as part of the Mets' bullpen, recording a 3.06 ERA with 23 strikeouts and 2 saves in 19 games. On July 13, 2024, Smith underwent season-ending Tommy John surgery to repair his ulnar collateral ligament and would likely be out until 2026. He became a free agent after the season.

On February 12, 2025, Smith re-signed with the Mets on a one-year, $1 million contract including a club option for 2026. He spent the entire year on the injured list and his club option was declined on November 4, making him a free agent.

=== Minnesota Twins ===
On February 16, 2026, The Washington Nationals signed Smith to a split minor league contract. Smith's agreement with Washington did not guarantee him a roster spot, but he can earn a reported $1.75 million salary with bonus incentives if he were to make the team. He was released by the Nationals prior to the start of the regular season on March 21.

On March 29, 2026, Smith signed a minor league contract with the Minnesota Twins. In 27 games with Triple-A St. Paul Saints, he compiled a 1–1 record and 4.74 ERA with 19 strikeouts and four saves across 24 2/3 innings pitched. On June 19, Smith was released by the Twins after exercising the opt-out clause in his contract.

Awards and achievements
Preceded by Corbin Burnes; Josh Hader	No-hitter pitcher April 29, 2022 (with Tylor Megill, Joely Rodríguez, Seth Lugo & Edwin Díaz)	Succeeded by Reid Detmers
