= Grant Hartwig =

American baseball player (born 1997)

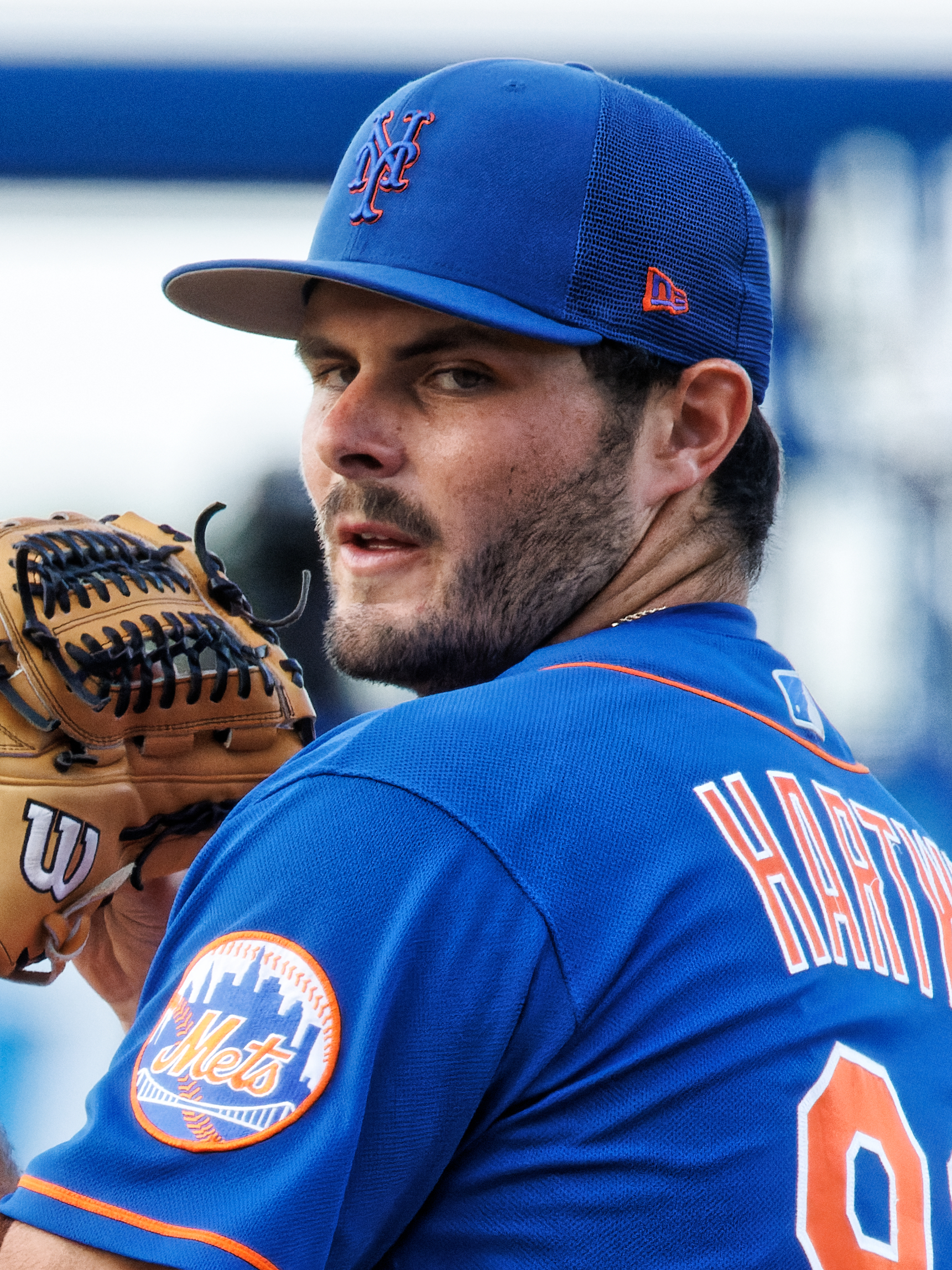
- Hartwig with the Mets in 2023

Free agent
- Pitcher
- Born: December 18, 1997 (age 28); Detroit, Michigan, U.S.
- Bats: Right Throws: Right

Professional debut
- MLB: June 19, 2023, for the New York Mets
- NPB: August 4, 2025, for the Hanshin Tigers

MLB statistics (through 2024 season)
- Win–loss record: 5–2
- Earned run average: 5.14
- Strikeouts: 34

NPB statistics (through 2025 season)
- Win–loss record: 2–0
- Earned run average: 3.65
- Strikeouts: 8
- Stats at Baseball Reference

Teams
- New York Mets (2023–2024); Hanshin Tigers (2025)

Grant Alexander Hartwig (born December 18, 1997) is an American professional baseball pitcher who is a free agent. He has previously played in Major League Baseball (MLB) for the New York Mets, and in Nippon Professional Baseball (NPB) for the Hanshin Tigers.

== Amateur career ==
Hartwig attended Detroit Catholic Central High School in Detroit, Michigan, and played for the school's baseball team. He enrolled at Miami University of Ohio, where he played college baseball for the Miami Redhawks. He underwent Tommy John surgery in April 2018 and missed the rest of the season and the entire 2019 season. The surgery and recovery made Hartwig interested in studying to become an orthopedic surgeon. The 2020 season was abbreviated due to the COVID-19 pandemic.

During the 2021 season, Hartwig's senior year, no scouts approached him prior to the 2021 Major League Baseball draft. He was not selected in the draft's 20 rounds. Hartwig graduated with a bachelor's degree in microbiology and returned to his parents' house and studied for the Medical College Admission Test (MCAT).

== Professional career ==
=== New York Mets ===
A few days after the draft, and two weeks before the MCAT, the New York Mets reached out to Hartwig and offered him a contract with a $20,000 signing bonus, the maximum allowed for an undrafted free agent. Hartwig chose to postpone taking the MCAT and signed with the Mets.

Hartwig started his professional career in 2021 with the Florida Complex League Mets and was promoted to the Low-A St. Lucie Mets. Hartwig was assigned to St. Lucie to begin the 2022 season, and was promoted to the High-A Brooklyn Cyclones in May. The Mets promoted him to the Double-A Binghamton Rumble Ponies in July and the Triple-A Syracuse Mets in September. Between the four teams, he recorded a 1.75 earned run average with 83 strikeouts and only one home run allowed in 56 2/3 innings pitched. After the season, he played for the Peoria Javelinas in the Arizona Fall League.

Hartwig started the 2023 season with Syracuse. In 21 appearances for the team, he registered a 4.21 ERA with 35 strikeouts and 3 saves in 25 2/3 innings of work. The Mets promoted Hartwig to the major leagues for the first time on June 19, 2023, and he made his major league debut the same day, relieving Max Scherzer in the ninth inning of a game against the Houston Astros. Hartwig pitched one inning, giving up no runs on one hit and one walk. He made 28 appearances for the Mets in his rookie campaign, posting a 5–2 record and a 4.84 ERA with 30 strikeouts across 35 1/3 innings pitched.

Hartwig was optioned to Triple–A Syracuse to begin the 2024 season. On June 21, 2024, Hartwig underwent surgery to repair a torn meniscus in his left knee and was ruled out for six–to–eight weeks. Once healthy, he made 4 appearances for the Mets, logging a 6.75 ERA with 4 strikeouts over 6 2/3 innings pitched. On November 22, Hartwig was non–tendered by the Mets and became a free agent.

On December 2, 2024, Hartwig re–signed with the Mets on a minor league contract. He made 21 appearances for Triple-A Syracuse, registering a 2-3 record and 3.42 ERA with 33 strikeouts and two saves across 23 2/3 innings pitched. On June 27, 2025, Hartwig was released by the Mets organization.

=== Hanshin Tigers ===
On July 14, 2025, Hartwig signed with the Hanshin Tigers of Nippon Professional Baseball. In 16 appearances for the Tigers, Hartwig logged a 2-0 record and 3.65 ERA with eight strikeouts across 12 1/3 innings pitched.

=== Minnesota Twins ===
On December 2, 2025, Hartwig signed a minor league contract with the Minnesota Twins. He made 34 appearances for the Triple–A St. Paul Saints, compiling a 5–3 record and 6.30 ERA with 38 strikeouts and four saves over 40 innings of relief. Hartwig was released by the Twins organization on August 6, 2026.
