= Phil Bickford =

American baseball player (born 1995)

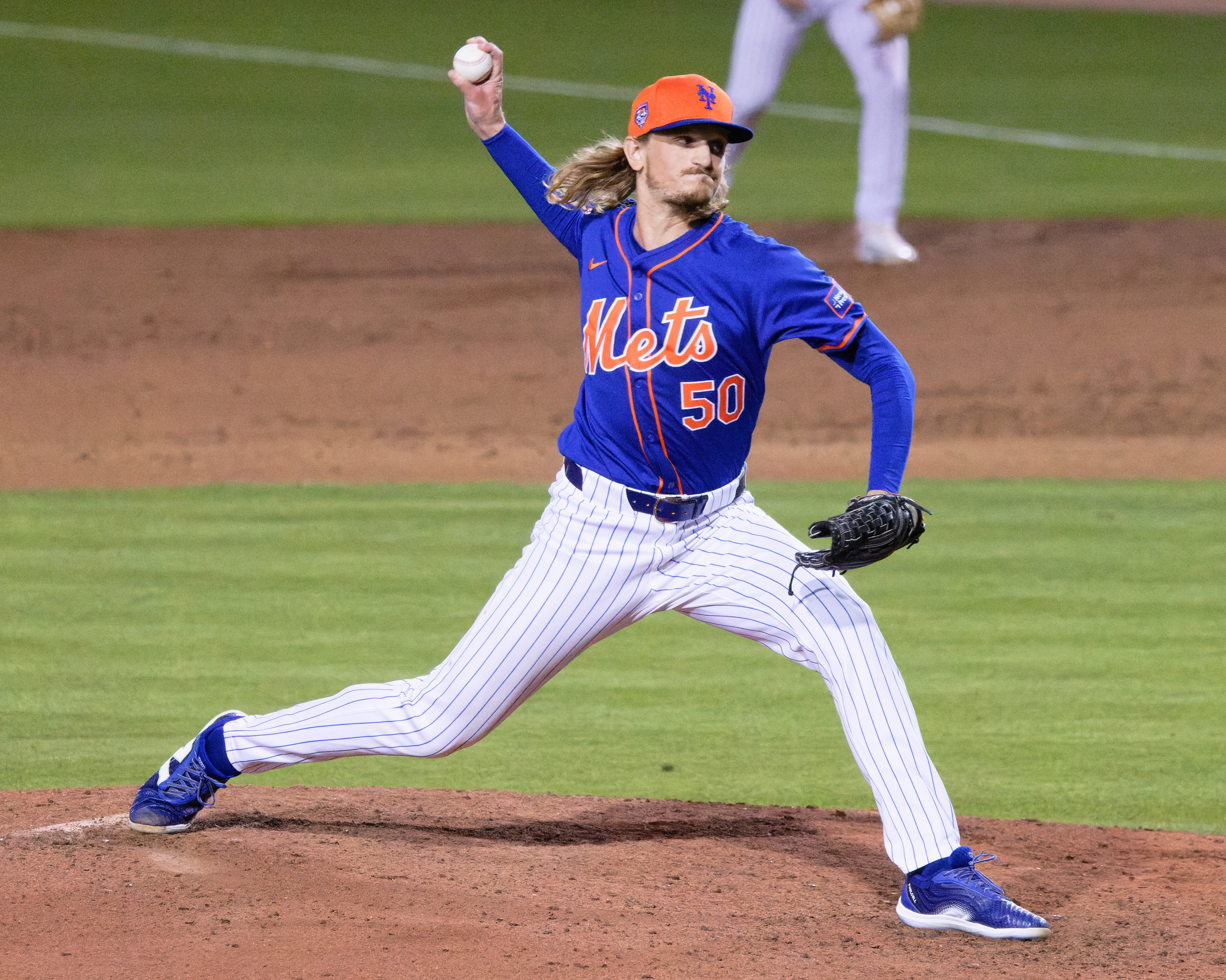
- Bickford with the New York Mets in 2024

Free agent
- Pitcher
- Born: July 10, 1995 (age 31); Ventura, California, U.S.
- Bats: Right Throws: Right

MLB debut
- September 1, 2020, for the Milwaukee Brewers

MLB statistics (through 2024 season)
- Win–loss record: 11–8
- Earned run average: 4.62
- Strikeouts: 210
- Stats at Baseball Reference

Teams
- Milwaukee Brewers (2020–2021); Los Angeles Dodgers (2021–2023); New York Mets (2023); New York Yankees (2024)

Phillip Roger Bickford (born July 10, 1995) is an American professional baseball pitcher who is a free agent. He has previously played in Major League Baseball (MLB) for the Milwaukee Brewers, Los Angeles Dodgers, New York Mets, and New York Yankees. He made his MLB debut in 2020.

== Amateur career ==
Bickford attended Oaks Christian School in Westlake Village, California. The Toronto Blue Jays selected Bickford in the first round, with the 10th overall selection, in the 2013 Major League Baseball draft, but he did not sign with the team.

Bickford enrolled at California State University, Fullerton and played college baseball for the Cal State Fullerton Titans for his freshman year. After his freshman season in 2014, he played collegiate summer baseball for the Yarmouth–Dennis Red Sox of the Cape Cod Baseball League, where he posted a 1.63 earned run average (ERA) with 44 strikeouts over 27 2/3 innings pitched, helped lead the Red Sox to the league championship, and was named the league's Outstanding Pro Prospect. Prior to his sophomore year, he transferred to the College of Southern Nevada in order to be eligible for the 2015 Major League Baseball draft.

== Professional career ==
=== San Francisco Giants ===
The San Francisco Giants selected Bickford with the 18th overall pick in the 2015 draft. Bickford signed with the Giants for $2,333,800 and was assigned to the rookie-level Arizona League Giants, where he spent the whole season, pitching to a 0–1 record and 2.01 ERA in ten games started. He began the 2016 season with the Augusta GreenJackets and was promoted to the San Jose Giants in June.

=== Milwaukee Brewers ===
On August 1, 2016, the Giants traded Bickford and Andrew Susac to the Milwaukee Brewers for Will Smith. Milwaukee assigned him to the Brevard County Manatees where he finished the season. In 23 total games (22 started) between Augusta, San Jose and Brevard County, Bickford posted a 7–7 record and 2.93 ERA as well as striking out 135 batters in 120 combined innings between the three clubs. He pitched only 17 innings in 2017 (with the rookie-level Arizona League Brewers) due to a 50-game suspension for testing positive for banned substances and a broken hand. Bickford spent 2018 and 2019 with the Advanced Single-A Carolina Mudcats. Over 21 games in 2018 he carried a 4.60 ERA and turned it into a 2.48 ERA over 20 games in 2019.

On September 1, 2020, Bickford was selected to the major leagues for the first time and made his MLB debut that night.

On April 28, 2021, Bickford was designated for assignment to clear roster space for the recently selected Zack Godley. He had allowed two earned runs in one inning of work up to that point in the year.

=== Los Angeles Dodgers ===
On May 3, 2021, Bickford was claimed off waivers by the Los Angeles Dodgers. On June 10, Bickford picked up his first career save against the Pittsburgh Pirates. On July 25, Bickford recorded his first career MLB win against the Colorado Rockies. He pitched in 56 games for the Dodgers in 2021, posting a 4–2 record with a 2.50 ERA and 59 strikeouts in 50 1/3 innings. Bickford pitched in three games in each of the 2021 NLDS and 2021 NLCS, in which he allowed just four hits in six total innings of shutout ball.

During the 2022 season, Bickford pitched in 60 games for the Dodgers, with a 2–1 record and 4.72 ERA. On September 23, Albert Pujols hit his 700th career home run off of him. Bickford pitched 42 innings over 36 games for the Dodgers in 2023, with a 2–3 record and 5.14 ERA. He was designated for assignment on July 29, 2023.

=== New York Mets ===
On August 1, 2023, Bickford and Adam Kolarek were traded to the New York Mets in exchange for cash considerations. In 25 appearances, he posted a 4.62 ERA with 28 strikeouts across 25 1/3 innings pitched.

Bickford received a $900,000 salary for the 2024 season through salary arbitration. Bickford was designated for assignment on March 23, following the signing of J. D. Martinez. He was then released by the Mets on March 26. The Mets remained responsible for $217,742 in termination pay for the 2024 season.

=== New York Yankees ===
On April 2, 2024, Bickford signed a minor league contract with the New York Yankees. In 22 games for the Triple–A Scranton/Wilkes-Barre RailRiders, he compiled a 2.93 ERA with 35 strikeouts and 4 saves across 27 2/3 innings pitched. On June 21, the Yankees selected Bickford's contract, adding him to their active roster. In four appearances, he struggled to a 6.23 ERA with four strikeouts in 4 1/3 innings. On June 30, Bickford was designated for assignment by the Yankees. On July 3, Bickford elected to become a free agent after clearing waivers. He re–signed with the Yankees on a new minor league contract the following day. On August 25, the Yankees selected Bickford's contract and added him back to their active roster. After four more appearances for the Yankees, he was designated for assignment on September 7. Bickford cleared waivers and was sent outright to Scranton on September 9. He elected free agency on October 1.

=== Chicago Cubs ===
On November 22, 2024, Bickford signed a minor league contract with the Chicago Cubs. In 20 appearances for the Triple-A Iowa Cubs, he logged a 1-1 record and 2.60 ERA with 36 strikeouts and two saves across 27 2/3 innings pitched. Bickford was released by the Cubs organization on July 2, 2025.

=== Philadelphia Phillies ===
On July 9, 2025, Bickford signed a minor league contract with the Philadelphia Phillies. He made 19 appearances for the Triple-A Lehigh Valley IronPigs, posting a 3-0 record and 4.91 ERA with 17 strikeouts across 18 1/3 innings pitched. Bickford elected free agency following the season on November 6.

=== Detroit Tigers ===
On January 13, 2026, Bickford signed a minor league contract with the Detroit Tigers. On April 2, Bickford was released by the Tigers organization.

== Personal life ==
Bickford was born in Newbury Park, California. He has one brother and four sisters.
