= Chris Flexen =

American baseball player (born 1994)

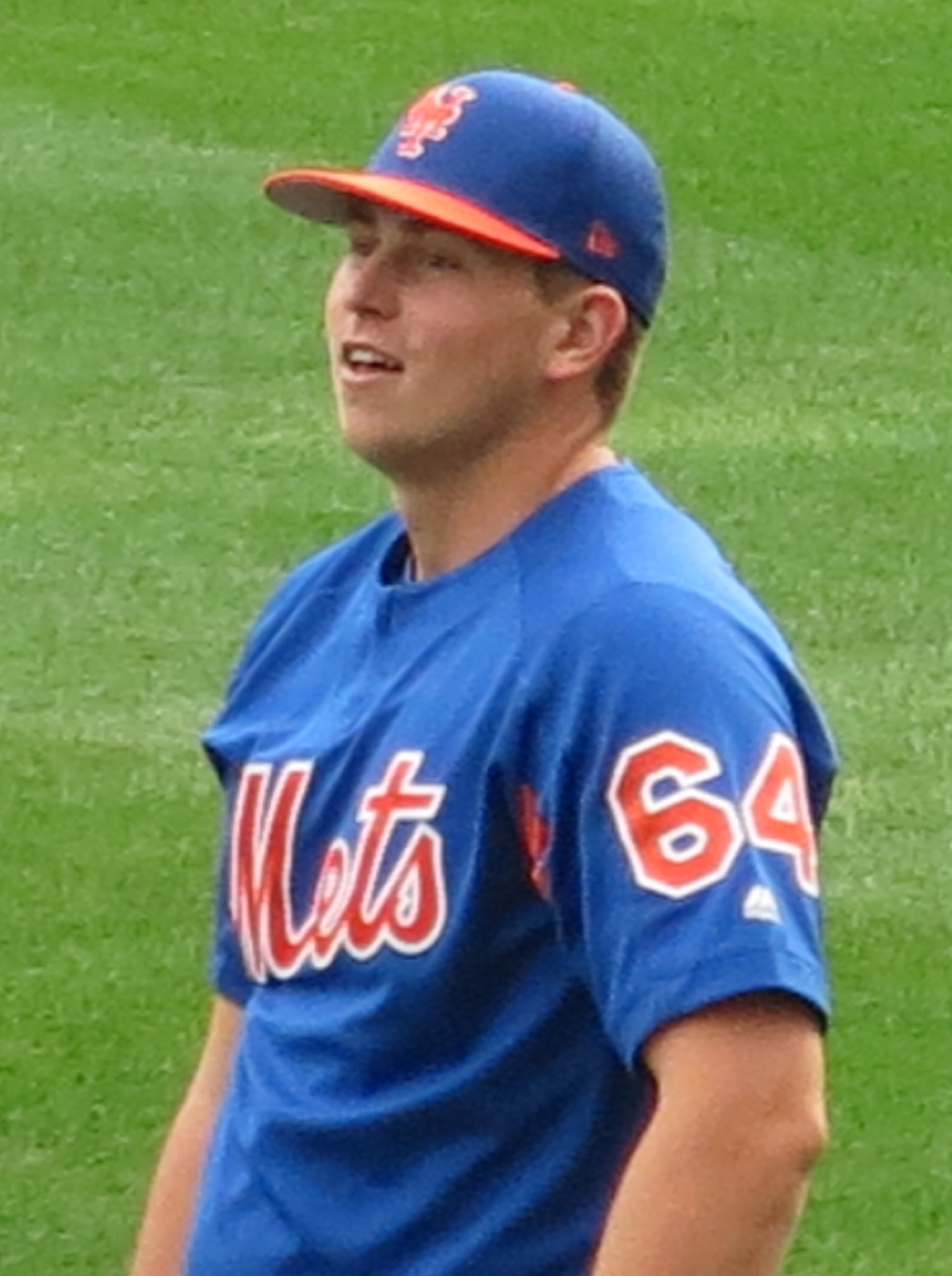
- Flexen with the New York Mets in 2017

Free agent
- Pitcher
- Born: July 1, 1994 (age 32); Newark, California, U.S.
- Bats: Right Throws: Right

Professional debut
- MLB: July 27, 2017, for the New York Mets
- KBO: May 7, 2020, for the Doosan Bears

MLB statistics (through 2025 season)
- Win–loss record: 35–50
- Earned run average: 4.83
- Strikeouts: 488

KBO statistics (through 2026 season)
- Win–loss record: 8–6
- Earned run average: 3.11
- Strikeouts: 135
- Stats at Baseball Reference

Teams
- New York Mets (2017–2019); Doosan Bears (2020); Seattle Mariners (2021–2023); Colorado Rockies (2023); Chicago White Sox (2024); Chicago Cubs (2025); Doosan Bears (2026)

Christopher John Flexen (born July 1, 1994) is an American professional baseball pitcher who is a free agent. He has previously played in Major League Baseball (MLB) for the New York Mets, Seattle Mariners, Colorado Rockies, Chicago White Sox, and Chicago Cubs. He has also played in the KBO League for the Doosan Bears.

== Amateur career ==
Flexen attended Newark Memorial High School in Newark, California where he was the quarterback of the school's football team and made the varsity baseball team as a freshman. His outstanding ability in two sports led to him earning his nickname "Flex.” Flexen initially committed to play college baseball for the Arizona State Sun Devils but was drafted in the 14th round of the 2012 Major League Baseball draft by the New York Mets and was lured away from his commitment by a $375,000 signing bonus.

== Professional career ==
=== New York Mets ===
Flexen spent 2012 with the Kingsport Mets, where he posted a 1–3 win–loss record with a 5.63 earned run average (ERA) in seven games. Flexen returned to Kingsport for the 2013 season, where he was 8–1 with a 2.09 ERA in 11 starts. In 2014, Flexen played for the Savannah Sand Gnats, where he was 3–5 with a 4.83 ERA in 13 starts. Flexen underwent Tommy John surgery in 2014. Flexen spent 2015 with Savannah, the Brooklyn Cyclones, and the GCL Mets, where he posted a combined 2.42 ERA in 12 games between the three clubs. In 2016, he pitched for the St. Lucie Mets where he was 10–9 with a 3.56 ERA in 25 starts. The Mets added him to their 40-man roster after the 2016 season. Flexen started 2017 with St. Lucie, and after posting a 2.13 ERA there while striking out over a batter per inning in three starts, he was called up to the Binghamton Rumble Ponies on May 31.

Flexen made his MLB debut on July 27, 2017, against the San Diego Padres at Petco Park. He gave up 4 runs on 5 hits in the start. He also became the fifth Mets player in franchise history to give up a home run to the first batter he faced in the Major Leagues after allowing one to Manuel Margot on only his third pitch. On August 8, 2017, Flexen recorded his first major league win against the Texas Rangers at Citi Field, pitching 5 1/3 innings, allowing three earned runs and striking out four batters.

MLB.com ranked Flexen as New York's ninth-best prospect going into the 2018 season. On May 19, Flexen, who started the season in the Pacific Coast League, was promoted to the Mets. He made only four appearances for the big league club, including one start, struggling to a 12.79 ERA and 3.16 WHIP over those outings. He underwent knee surgery in early August, ending his 2018 season.

=== Doosan Bears ===
Flexen was designated for assignment on December 6, 2019, and on the next day, it was announced that Flexen signed a one-year contract with KBO's Doosan Bears, the reigning Korean Series champion. Flexen pitched to a 3.01 ERA with 10.2 K/9 for the Bears in 2020.

=== Seattle Mariners ===
On December 9, 2020, Flexen signed a two-year, $4.75 million contract with the Seattle Mariners. Flexen made the starting rotation to start the 2021 season and made his first start of the year on April 3 against the San Francisco Giants. He pitched five scoreless innings, allowed four hits and two walks, struck out six batters, and was credited with the win. His 2021 season with Seattle represented a marked improvement from his past performances in MLB. Among qualified American League pitchers that year, he finished in the top 10 in ERA (3.61), wins (14), ERA+ (111), Fielding Independent Pitching (3.89), and games started (31). He also recorded the most starts of 7 innings pitched with 1 earned run or fewer allowed among all AL pitchers. Over the course of the 2021 season, he attempted pickoffs at first base 141 times, more than any other major league pitcher, and picked off three runners.

Flexen began the 2022 season as a starter, before transitioning to a relief pitcher later in the year. On August 30, 2022, Flexen recorded his first career save after allowing three runs on five hits in a 9–3 victory over the Detroit Tigers. He finished the season making 33 appearances and registering an 8–9 record and 3.73 ERA with 95 strikeouts and 2 saves in 137 2/3 innings pitched.

In 2023, Flexen made 17 appearances for Seattle (including 4 starts), and struggled to an 0–4 record and 7.71 ERA with 29 strikeouts in 42 innings pitched. On June 27, 2023, Flexen was designated for assignment by the Mariners.

On July 3, 2023, the Mariners traded Flexen and Trevor Gott to the New York Mets in exchange for Zach Muckenhirn. The Mets designated Flexen for assignment after the deal was made official without making an appearance with the team. He was released by the team on July 6.

=== Colorado Rockies ===
On July 13, 2023, Flexen signed a minor league contract with the Colorado Rockies organization. After two starts for the Triple–A Albuquerque Isotopes, Flexen had his contract selected to Colorado's major league roster on July 29. Over 12 starts, Flexen pitched to a 2–4 record with a 6.27 ERA and 45 strikeouts in 60 1/3 innings pitched. He declared free agency on November 2.

=== Chicago White Sox ===
On December 30, 2023, Flexen signed a one-year, $1.75 million contract with Chicago White Sox. In 33 appearances (30 starts) for the White Sox during the 2024 campaign, Flexen compiled a 3-15 record and 4.95 ERA with 123 strikeouts across 160 innings pitched.

=== Chicago Cubs ===
On February 17, 2025, Flexen signed a minor league contract with the Chicago Cubs. He began the year with the Triple-A Iowa Cubs, posting a 3-0 record and 1.16 ERA with 21 strikeouts over his first five starts. On April 30, the Cubs selected Flexen's contract, adding him to their active roster. On May 2, Flexen earned a save in his first game with the Cubs. In the 10–0 win against the Milwaukee Brewers, he pitched three innings and recorded four strikeouts. In 21 appearances for Chicago, Flexen compiled a 5-1 record and 3.09 ERA with 22 strikeouts across 43 2/3 innings pitched. On July 29, Flexen was designated for assignment by the Cubs. He was released by Chicago after clearing waivers on August 3.

=== Doosan Bears (second stint) ===
On December 18, 2025, Flexen signed a one-year, $1 million contract to return to the Doosan Bears of the KBO League. He made two starts, going 0–2 with a 5.40 ERA, before a shoulder injury landed him on the injured list. On June 29, 2026, Flexen was released by Doosan without making another appearance for the team.
