= Zach Muckenhirn =

American baseball player (born 1995)

- Pitcher
- Born: February 27, 1995 (age 31); Delano, Minnesota, U.S.
- Batted: Left Threw: Left

MLB debut
- May 3, 2023, for the New York Mets

Last MLB appearance
- June 9, 2023, for the New York Mets

MLB statistics
- Win–loss record: 0–0
- Earned run average: 6.00
- Strikeouts: 3
- Stats at Baseball Reference

Teams
- New York Mets (2023)

Zachary Edward Muckenhirn (born February 27, 1995) is an American former professional baseball pitcher. He has previously played in Major League Baseball (MLB) for the New York Mets.

== Career ==
=== Amateur career ===
Muckenhirn graduated from Delano High School in Delano, Minnesota, in 2013. He attended the University of North Dakota (UND) and played college baseball for the North Dakota Fighting Hawks.

=== Baltimore Orioles ===
The Baltimore Orioles selected Muckenhirn in the 11th round, with the 331st overall selection, of the 2016 MLB draft. With the selection, he become the highest drafted player in UND history. He made his professional debut with the Low-A Aberdeen IronBirds, appearing in 12 games and registering a 5–2 record and 2.43 ERA with 34 strikeouts.

In 2017, Muckenhirn made 27 appearances (21 starts) split between Aberdeen and the Single-A Delmarva Shorebirds. Pitching 124 2/3 innings, he posted a 5–10 record and 5.13 ERA with 103 strikeouts. The following year, Muckenhirn made 44 relief appearances split between Delmarva, the High-A Frederick Keys, and the Double-A Bowie Baysox, recording a cumulative 3.64 ERA with 79 strikeouts and eight saves in 64 1/3 innings pitched.

Muckenhirn began the 2019 season with Double-A Bowie, receiving a promotion to the Triple-A Norfolk Tides later in the year. In 41 appearances split between the two affiliates, he logged a 3–6 record and 4.11 ERA with 73 strikeouts and five saves in 57 innings pitched. Muckenhirn did not play in a game in 2020 due to the cancellation of the minor league season because of the COVID-19 pandemic. On April 30, 2021, Muckenhirn was released by the Orioles organization.

=== Chicago White Sox ===
On May 1, 2021, Muckenhirn signed a minor league contract with the Chicago White Sox organization. He spent the year with the Double-A Birmingham Barons, appearing in 30 games and posting a 3–1 record and 1.77 ERA with 42 strikeouts in 40 2/3 innings pitched.

In 2022, Muckenhirn made 47 appearances for the Triple-A Charlotte Knights, registering a 3–1 record and 3.11 ERA with 56 strikeouts and two saves in 55 innings. He elected free agency following the season on November 10, 2022.

=== New York Mets ===
On November 23, 2022, Muckenhirn signed a minor league contract with the New York Mets organization. He competed for a bullpen spot in Spring Training, but did not win the job and was assigned to the Triple-A Syracuse Mets to begin the 2023 season. In six appearances to start the year, he posted a 0.77 ERA with four strikeouts and one save in 11 2/3 innings. On May 1, 2023, the Mets selected Muckenhirn to the 40-man roster and promoted him to the major leagues for the first time in advance of the team's doubleheader against the Atlanta Braves. He debuted on May 3, tossing 1 2/3 innings of one-hit, no-run ball against the Detroit Tigers. He made 3 appearances for the Mets, surrendering four runs on 11 hits and two walks with three strikeouts in six innings pitched. On July 3, Muckenhirn was designated for assignment after Elieser Hernández was activated from the injured list.

=== Seattle Mariners ===
On July 3, 2023, the Mets traded Muckenhirn to the Seattle Mariners in exchange for Chris Flexen and Trevor Gott. In 7 appearances for the Triple–A Tacoma Rainiers, he struggled to a 9.35 ERA with 5 strikeouts in 8 2/3 innings pitched. On August 9, he was designated for assignment following the promotion of Emerson Hancock. He cleared waivers and was sent outright to Triple–A Tacoma on August 11. Muckenhirn elected free agency following the season on November 6.

=== High Point Rockers ===
On April 10, 2024, Muckenhirn signed with the High Point Rockers of the Atlantic League of Professional Baseball. In 25 appearances for High Point, Muckenhirn logged a 4.24 ERA with 38 strikeouts across 34 innings pitched.

=== Sultanes de Monterrey ===
On July 5, 2024, Muckenhirn signed with the Sultanes de Monterrey of the Mexican League. In 9 games for Monterrey, he recorded a 1.04 ERA with 6 strikeouts across 8 2/3 innings pitched.

In 2025, Muckenhirn returned to Monterrey for a second season however he was placed on the reserve list and did not appear in a game for Monterrey.

== Post Playing Career ==
In 2026, Muckenhirn joined the coaching staff of his former high school in Ohio.
