= 2024 Atlanta Braves season =

2024 Atlanta Braves
- National League Wild Card
- League: National League
- Division: East
- Ballpark: Truist Park
- City: Atlanta
- Record: 89–73 (.549)
- Divisional place: 2nd
- General manager: Alex Anthopoulos
- Manager: Brian Snitker
- Television: Bally Sports Southeast; Bally Sports South (Brandon Gaudin, C. J. Nitkowski, Jeff Francoeur, Tom Glavine, Nick Green, Kris Medlen, Peter Moylan, Gordon Beckham, Ashley ShahAhmadi, Hanna Yates, Wiley Ballard)
- Radio: 680 The Fan; Rock 100.5; Atlanta Braves Radio Network (Ben Ingram, Kevin McAlpin, Joe Simpson); 1600 La Mejor (Daniel Cantú, Emanuel Zamarrón)

The 2024 Atlanta Braves season was the 154th season of the Atlanta Braves franchise, the 59th in Atlanta, and the Braves' eighth season at Truist Park. The Braves were managed by Brian Snitker, in his ninth season as the team's manager. The Braves failed to improve on their 104–58 record from the previous season following a loss to the Philadelphia Phillies on August 21.

On September 20, the Braves were eliminated from the National League East division race with a loss to the Miami Marlins, bringing their run of six consecutive National League East division titles, from 2018 to 2023, to an end.

On September 30, the Braves were the last team to qualify for the postseason following their victory during the second game of their doubleheader against the New York Mets. They were swept by the San Diego Padres in the National League Wild Card Series in two games.

== Offseason ==
=== October 2023 ===
October 24	Braves signed right-handed pitcher Pierce Johnson to a 2 year, $14.25 million contract extension

=== November 2023 ===
November 2	RHP Jesse Chavez and OF Kevin Pillar elected free agency Braves signed right-handed pitcher Joe Jiménez to a 3 year, $26 million contract
November 5	LHP Brad Hand elected free agency after having his mutual option declined by the Braves.
November 6	OF Eddie Rosario along RHPs Collin McHugh and Kirby Yates elected free agency after having their club options declined by the Braves.
November 16	Chicago White Sox traded left-handed pitcher Aaron Bummer to Atlanta Braves for right-handed pitchers Michael Soroka, Riley Gowens, left-handed pitcher Jared Shuster and infielders Nicky Lopez and Braden Shewmake
November 20	Braves signed right-handed pitcher Reynaldo López to a 3 year, $30 million contract
November 30	Braves signed right-handed pitchers Jackson Stephens and Penn Murfee to 1 year split contracts

=== December 2023 ===
December 3	Seattle Mariners traded left-handed pitcher Marco Gonzales, outfielder Jarred Kelenic, 1st baseman Evan White and cash to Atlanta Braves for right-handed pitchers Jackson Kowar and Cole Phillips
December 5	Pittsburgh Pirates traded cash or a player to be named later to Atlanta Braves for left-handed pitcher Marco Gonzales
December 8	Los Angeles Angels traded infielder David Fletcher and catcher Max Stassi to Atlanta Braves for 1st baseman Evan White and left-handed pitcher Tyler Thomas
December 9	Chicago White Sox traded a player to be named later to Atlanta Braves for catcher Max Stassi
December 15	San Diego Padres traded designated hitter/infielder Matt Carpenter, left-handed pitcher Ray Kerr and cash to Atlanta Braves for outfielder Drew Campbell
December 30	Boston Red Sox traded left-handed pitcher Chris Sale to Atlanta Braves for infielder Vaughn Grissom

== Season standings ==
=== National League East ===
NL East
Team	W	L	Pct.	GB	Home	Road
Philadelphia Phillies	95	67	.586	—	54‍–‍27	41‍–‍40
Atlanta Braves	89	73	.549	6	46‍–‍35	43‍–‍38
New York Mets	89	73	.549	6	46‍–‍35	43‍–‍38
Washington Nationals	71	91	.438	24	38‍–‍43	33‍–‍48
Miami Marlins	62	100	.383	33	30‍–‍51	32‍–‍49

=== National League Wild Card ===
Division leaders
Team	W	L	Pct.
Los Angeles Dodgers	98	64	.605
Philadelphia Phillies	95	67	.586
Milwaukee Brewers	93	69	.574

Wild Card teams (Top 3 teams qualify for postseason)
Team	W	L	Pct.	GB
San Diego Padres	93	69	.574	+4
Atlanta Braves	89	73	.549	—
New York Mets	89	73	.549	—
Arizona Diamondbacks	89	73	.549	—
St. Louis Cardinals	83	79	.512	6
Chicago Cubs	83	79	.512	6
San Francisco Giants	80	82	.494	9
Cincinnati Reds	77	85	.475	12
Pittsburgh Pirates	76	86	.469	13
Washington Nationals	71	91	.438	18
Miami Marlins	62	100	.383	27
Colorado Rockies	61	101	.377	28

=== Record vs. opponents ===
==== Record vs. National League ====
2024 National League record Source: MLB Standings Grid – 2024
Team	AZ	ATL	CHC	CIN	COL	LAD	MIA	MIL	NYM	PHI	PIT	SD	SF	STL	WSH	AL
Arizona	—	2–5	3–3	5–1	9–4	6–7	4–2	4–3	3–4	4–3	4–2	6–7	7–6	3–3	5–1	24–22
Atlanta	5–2	—	4–2	2–4	3–3	2–5	9–4	2–4	7–6	7–6	3–3	3–4	4–3	2–4	5–8	31–15
Chicago	3–3	2–4	—	5–8	4–2	4–2	4–3	5–8	3–4	2–4	7–6	2–4	3–4	6–7	6–1	27–19
Cincinnati	1–5	4–2	8–5	—	6–1	4–3	5–2	4–9	2–4	4–3	5–8	2–4	2–4	7–6	2–4	21–25
Colorado	4–9	3–3	2–4	1–6	—	3–10	2–5	4–3	2–4	2–4	2–4	8–5	3–10	3–4	2–4	20–26
Los Angeles	7–6	5–2	2–4	3–4	10–3	—	5–1	4–3	4–2	1–5	4–2	5–8	9–4	5–2	4–2	30–16
Miami	2–4	4–9	3–4	2–5	5–2	1–5	—	4–2	6–7	6–7	0–7	2–4	3–3	3–3	2–11	19–27
Milwaukee	3–4	4–2	8–5	9–4	3–4	3–4	2–4	—	5–1	2–4	7–6	2–5	4–2	8–5	2–4	31–15
New York	4–3	6–7	4–3	4–2	4–2	2–4	7–6	1–5	—	6–7	5–2	5–2	2–4	4–2	11–2	24–22
Philadelphia	3–4	6–7	4–2	3–4	4–2	5–1	7–6	4–2	7–6	—	3–4	5–1	5–2	4–2	9–4	26–20
Pittsburgh	2–4	3–3	6–7	8–5	4–2	2–4	7–0	6–7	2–5	4–3	—	0–6	2–4	5–8	4–3	20–26
San Diego	7–6	4–3	4–2	4–2	5–8	8–5	4–2	5–2	2–5	1–5	6–0	—	7–6	3–4	6–0	27–19
San Francisco	6–7	3–4	4–3	4–2	10–3	4–9	3–3	2–4	4–2	2–5	4–2	6–7	—	1–5	4–3	23–23
St. Louis	3–3	4–2	7–6	6–7	4–3	2–5	3–3	5–8	2–4	2–4	8–5	4–3	5–1	—	4–3	24–22
Washington	1–5	8–5	1–6	4–2	4–2	2–4	11–2	4–2	2–11	4–9	3–4	0–6	3–4	3–4	—	21–25

Updated with the results of all games through September 30, 2024.

==== Record vs. American League ====
2024 National League record vs. American League Source: MLB Standings
Team	BAL	BOS	CWS	CLE	DET	HOU	KC	LAA	MIN	NYY	OAK	SEA	TB	TEX	TOR
Arizona	1–2	3–0	2–1	3–0	1–2	1–2	2–1	2–1	1–2	1–2	2–1	1–2	0–3	2–2	2–1
Atlanta	1–2	3–1	1–2	2–1	3–0	3–0	2–1	2–1	3–0	2–1	2–1	1–2	2–1	2–1	2–1
Chicago	3–0	1–2	4–0	0–3	2–1	3–0	2–1	2–1	2–1	1–2	1–2	2–1	1–2	1–2	2–1
Cincinnati	0–3	1–2	3–0	1–3	0–3	3–0	0–3	3–0	2–1	3–0	1–2	0–3	1–2	1–2	2–1
Colorado	1–2	2–1	1–2	2–1	1–2	0–4	2–1	2–1	1–2	1–2	1–2	1–2	1–2	3–0	1–2
Los Angeles	2–1	3–0	3–0	2–1	1–2	1–2	2–1	2–2	2–1	2–1	2–1	3–0	2–1	1–2	2–1
Miami	2–1	0–3	2–1	1–2	2–1	0–3	1–2	0–3	2–1	1–2	1–2	2–1	1–3	1–2	3–0
Milwaukee	2–1	2–1	3–0	3–0	2–1	1–2	1–2	2–1	3–1	1–2	2–1	2–1	2–1	3–0	2–1
New York	2–1	3–0	3–0	0–3	1–2	1–2	2–1	1–2	2–1	4–0	1–2	0–3	0–3	2–1	2–1
Philadelphia	1–2	1–2	3–0	1–2	2–1	2–1	2–1	2–1	1–2	0–3	1–2	1–2	3–0	3–0	3–1
Pittsburgh	2–1	0–3	3–0	1–2	2–2	2–1	1–2	1–2	2–1	2–1	0–3	2–1	1–2	1–2	1–2
San Diego	2–1	2–1	3–0	2–1	2–1	2–1	2–1	0–3	2–1	1–2	3–0	1–3	2–1	2–1	1–2
San Francisco	2–1	1–2	2–1	1–2	2–1	2–1	3–0	1–2	2–1	0–3	2–2	1–2	1–2	2–1	1–2
St. Louis	3–0	2–1	1–2	2–1	1–2	1–2	1–3	2–1	2–1	2–1	2–1	1–2	2–1	2–1	0–3
Washington	2–2	1–2	1–2	1–2	2–1	2–1	0–3	2–1	1–2	2–1	1–2	2–1	1–2	1–2	2–1

Updated with the results of all games through September 30, 2024.

== Game log ==
Legend
	Braves win
	Braves loss
	Postponement
	Clinched playoff spot
**Bold**	Braves team member

2024 Game Log: 89–73 (Home: 46–35; Away: 43–38)
March/April: 19–9 (Home: 11–4; Away: 8–5)

#	Date	Opponent	Score	Win	Loss	Save	Attendance	Record	Streak
—	March 28	@ Phillies	Postponed (rain); Makeup: March 29						
1	March 29	@ Phillies	9–3	**Johnson** (1–0)	Alvarado (0–1)	—	44,452	1–0	W1
2	March 30	@ Phillies	12–4	**Chavez** (1–0)	Nola (0–1)	—	44,468	2–0	W2
3	March 31	@ Phillies	4–5	Strahm (1–0)	**Bummer** (0–1)	Alvarado (1)	42,515	2–1	L1
4	April 1	@ White Sox	9–0 (8)	**Morton** (1–0)	Flexen (0–1)	—	13,781	3–1	W1
5	April 2	@ White Sox	2–3	Crochet (1–1)	**Minter** (0–1)	Kopech (1)	12,300	3–2	L1
—	April 3	@ White Sox	Postponed (rain); Makeup: June 27						
6	April 5	Diamondbacks	6–5 (10)	**Johnson** (2–0)	McGough (0–2)	—	41,426	4–2	W1
7	April 6	Diamondbacks	9–8	**Minter** (1–1)	Frías (0–1)	**Iglesias** (1)	41,278	5–2	W2
8	April 7	Diamondbacks	5–2	**Sale** (1–0)	Nelson (0–2)	**Johnson** (1)	40,693	6–2	W3
9	April 8	Mets	7–8	Diekman (1–0)	**Johnson** (2–1)	López (1)	37,538	6–3	L1
10	April 9	Mets	6–5	**López** (1–0)	Houser (0–1)	**Iglesias** (2)	32,065	7–3	W1
—	April 10	Mets	Postponed (rain); Makeup: September 26						
11	April 11	Mets	4–16	Quintana (1–1)	**Winans** (0–1)	—	34,352	7–4	L1
12	April 12	@ Marlins	8–1	**Fried** (1–0)	Rogers (0–2)	—	14,408	8–4	W1
13	April 13	@ Marlins	1–5	Meyer (2–0)	**Sale** (1–1)	—	22,327	8–5	L1
14	April 14	@ Marlins	9–7	**Minter** (2–1)	Scott (0–3)	**Iglesias** (3)	20,757	9–5	W1
15	April 15	@ Astros	6–1	**Bummer** (1–1)	Arrighetti (0–2)	—	32,407	10–5	W2
16	April 16	@ Astros	6–2	**López** (2–0)	Brown (0–3)	**Iglesias** (4)	34,144	11–5	W3
17	April 17	@ Astros	5–4 (10)	**Minter** (3–1)	Martinez (1–1)	**Iglesias** (5)	29,073	12–5	W4
18	April 19	Rangers	8–3	**Sale** (2–1)	Latz (0–1)	—	40,810	13–5	W5
19	April 20	Rangers	5–2	**Morton** (2–0)	Eovaldi (1–2)	**Iglesias** (6)	41,744	14–5	W6
20	April 21	Rangers	4–6	Lorenzen (2–0)	**Vines** (0–1)	Yates (3)	36,581	14–6	L1
21	April 22	Marlins	3–0	**Elder** (1–0)	Weathers (2–2)	**Iglesias** (7)	31,572	15–6	W1
22	April 23	Marlins	5–0	**Fried** (2–0)	Rogers (0–3)	—	33,533	16–6	W2
23	April 24	Marlins	4–3 (10)	**Minter** (4–1)	Scott (0–4)	—	38,950	17–6	W3
24	April 26	Guardians	6–2	**Sale** (3–1)	Allen (3–1)	—	40,210	18–6	W4
25	April 27	Guardians	2–4 (11)	Barlow (2–2)	**Lee** (0–1)	Sandlin (1)	41,696	18–7	L1
26	April 28	Guardians	4–3 (10)	**Minter** (5–1)	Clase (1–1)	—	40,758	19–7	W1
27	April 29	@ Mariners	1–2	Voth (1–0)	**Minter** (5–2)	—	26,452	19–8	L1
28	April 30	@ Mariners	2–3	Castillo (3–4)	**López** (2–1)	Muñoz (5)	23,534	19–9	L2

May: 13–14 (Home: 7–7; Away: 6–7)

#	Date	Opponent	Score	Win	Loss	Save	Attendance	Record	Streak
29	May 1	@ Mariners	5–2	**Sale** (4–1)	Hancock (3–3)	**Iglesias** (8)	21,689	20–9	W1
30	May 3	@ Dodgers	3–4 (11)	Grove (1–1)	**Chavez** (1–1)	—	50,859	20–10	L1
31	May 4	@ Dodgers	2–11	Glasnow (6–1)	**Elder** (1–1)	—	44,474	20–11	L2
32	May 5	@ Dodgers	1–5	Paxton (4–0)	**Fried** (2–1)	—	52,733	20–12	L3
33	May 7	Red Sox	4–2	**Jiménez** (1–0)	Slaten (2–1)	**Iglesias** (9)	38,142	21–12	W1
34	May 8	Red Sox	5–0	**Sale** (5–1)	Pivetta (1–2)	—	37,015	22–12	W2
35	May 10	@ Mets	4–1	**Morton** (3–0)	Quintana (1–4)	**Iglesias** (10)	23,355	23–12	W3
36	May 11	@ Mets	4–1	**Fried** (3–1)	Scott (0–1)	—	38,919	24–12	W4
37	May 12	@ Mets	3–4	Díaz (1–1)	**Minter** (5–3)	—	18,944	24–13	L1
38	May 13	Cubs	2–0	**Kerr** (1–0)	Wesneski (2–2)	**Minter** (1)	34,582	25–13	W1
39	May 14	Cubs	7–0	**Sale** (6–1)	Taillon (3–1)	—	37,357	26–13	W2
40	May 15	Cubs	1–7	Assad (4–0)	**Morton** (3–1)	—	36,623	26–14	L1
41	May 17	Padres	1–3	Waldron (2–5)	**Fried** (3–2)	Estrada (1)	40,186	26–15	L2
—	May 18	Padres	Postponed (rain); Makeup: May 20						
42	May 19	Padres	1–9	Darvish (4–1)	**Elder** (1–2)	—	39,203	26–16	L3
43	May 20 (1)	Padres	5–6	Brito (1–2)	**Jiménez** (1–1)	Suárez (13)	35,113	26–17	L4
44	May 20 (2)	Padres	3–0	**Sale** (7–1)	Vásquez (0–3)	**Iglesias** (11)	34,753	27–17	W1
45	May 21	@ Cubs	3–4 (10)	Little (1–0)	**Bummer** (1–2)	—	36,121	27–18	L1
46	May 22	@ Cubs	9–2	**Fried** (4–2)	Steele (0–2)	—	37,584	28–18	W1
47	May 23	@ Cubs	3–0	**Lee** (1–1)	Wesneski (2–3)	**Iglesias** (12)	35,646	29–18	W2
48	May 24	@ Pirates	5–11	Falter (3–2)	**Kerr** (1–1)	—	35,822	29–19	L1
49	May 25	@ Pirates	1–4	Keller (6–3)	**López** (2–2)	Bednar (11)	31,459	29–20	L2
50	May 26	@ Pirates	8–1	**Sale** (8–1)	Mlodzinski (0–2)	—	27,416	30–20	W1
51	May 27	Nationals	4–8	Parker (4–2)	**Morton** (3–2)	—	38,858	30–21	L1
52	May 28	Nationals	2–0	**Fried** (5–2)	Barnes (2–2)	**Iglesias** (13)	37,598	31–21	W1
53	May 29	Nationals	2–7	Gore (4–4)	**Schwellenbach** (0–1)	—	33,654	31–22	L1
54	May 30	Nationals	1–3	Williams (5–0)	**Kerr** (1–2)	Finnegan (15)	37,784	31–23	L2
55	May 31	Athletics	4–2	**López** (3–2)	Sears (4–4)	**Iglesias** (14)	40,204	32–23	W1

June: 14–13 (Home: 8–3; Away: 6–10)

#	Date	Opponent	Score	Win	Loss	Save	Attendance	Record	Streak
56	June 1	Athletics	9–11	Kelly (3–2)	**Herget** (0–1)	Jiménez (1)	41,181	32–24	L1
57	June 2	Athletics	3–1	**Lee** (2–1)	Adams (0–1)	**Iglesias** (15)	37,853	33–24	W1
58	June 4	@ Red Sox	8–3	**Fried** (6–2)	Crawford (2–5)	—	34,628	34–24	W2
59	June 5	@ Red Sox	0–9	Pivetta (3–4)	**Schwellenbach** (0–2)	—	33,760	34–25	L1
60	June 6	@ Nationals	5–2	**Bummer** (2–2)	Harvey (2–2)	**Iglesias** (16)	27,690	35–25	W1
61	June 7	@ Nationals	1–2	Irvin (4–5)	**Sale** (8–2)	Finnegan (17)	39,175	35–26	L1
62	June 8	@ Nationals	3–7	Gore (5–5)	**Morton** (3–3)	—	33,998	35–27	L2
63	June 9	@ Nationals	5–8	Barnes (3–2)	**Waldrep** (0–1)	Finnegan (18)	34,282	35–28	L3
64	June 11	@ Orioles	0–4	Suárez (3–0)	**Fried** (6–3)	—	24,048	35–29	L4
65	June 12	@ Orioles	2–4	Akin (2–0)	**Jiménez** (1–2)	Kimbrel (16)	24,122	35–30	L5
66	June 13	@ Orioles	6–3	**López** (4–2)	Irvin (6–3)	**Iglesias** (17)	33,700	36–30	W1
67	June 14	Rays	7–3	**Sale** (9–2)	Littell (2–5)	**Iglesias** (18)	41,046	37–30	W2
68	June 15	Rays	9–2	**Morton** (4–3)	Pepiot (4–4)	—	40,480	38–30	W3
69	June 16	Rays	6–8	Adam (3–2)	**Iglesias** (0–1)	Fairbanks (10)	40,211	38–31	L1
70	June 17	Tigers	2–1	**Hernández** (1–0)	Miller (4–5)	**Jiménez** (1)	38,273	39–31	W1
71	June 18	Tigers	2–1	**Schwellenbach** (1–2)	Mize (1–5)	**Iglesias** (19)	37,561	40–31	W2
72	June 19	Tigers	7–0	**López** (5–2)	Skubal (8–3)	—	36,055	41–31	W3
73	June 21	@ Yankees	8–1	**Sale** (10–2)	Rodón (9–4)	—	45,226	42–31	W4
74	June 22	@ Yankees	3–8	Stroman (7–3)	**Morton** (4–4)	—	45,056	42–32	L1
75	June 23	@ Yankees	3–1	**Fried** (7–3)	Cortés Jr. (4–6)	**Iglesias** (20)	46,683	43–32	W1
76	June 24	@ Cardinals	3–4	Lynn (3–3)	**Schwellenbach** (1–3)	Helsley (27)	36,005	43–33	L1
—	June 25	@ Cardinals	Postponed (rain); Makeup: June 26						
77	June 26 (1)	@ Cardinals	6–2	**López** (6–2)	Gibson (5–3)	—	33,997	44–33	W1
78	June 26 (2)	@ Cardinals	1–4	Liberatore (2–2)	**Elder** (1–3)	Helsley (28)	33,921	44–34	L1
79	June 27	@ White Sox	0–1	Shuster (1–0)	**Sale** (10–3)	Kopech (6)	12,656	44–35	L2
80	June 28	Pirates	6–1	**Morton** (5–4)	Pérez (1–4)	—	42,155	45–35	W1
81	June 29	Pirates	2–1 (10)	**Hernández** (2–0)	Nicolas (0–2)	—	40,864	46–35	W2
82	June 30	Pirates	2–4	Falter (4–6)	**Schwellenbach** (1–4)	Chapman (3)	36,679	46–36	L1

July: 12–13 (Home: 4–7; Away: 8–6)

#	Date	Opponent	Score	Win	Loss	Save	Attendance	Record	Streak
83	July 2	Giants	3–5	Birdsong (1–0)	**Lee** (2–2)	Doval (15)	34,047	46–37	L2
84	July 3	Giants	3–1	**Sale** (11–3)	Hicks (4–5)	**Iglesias** (21)	38,834	47–37	W1
85	July 4	Giants	2–4	Webb (7–6)	**Morton** (5–5)	Doval (16)	40,672	47–38	L1
86	July 5	Phillies	6–8	Nola (10–4)	**Fried** (7–4)	Hoffman (8)	40,942	47–39	L2
87	July 6	Phillies	5–1	**Schwellenbach** (2–4)	Suárez (10–3)	—	41,006	48–39	W1
88	July 7	Phillies	6–0	**López** (7–2)	Mercado (1–1)	—	36,808	49–39	W2
89	July 8	@ Diamondbacks	5–4 (11)	**Iglesias** (1–1)	Martínez (0–1)	**Jiménez** (2)	20,594	50–39	W3
90	July 9	@ Diamondbacks	6–2	**Sale** (12–3)	Gallen (6–5)	—	21,652	51–39	W4
91	July 10	@ Diamondbacks	5–7	Thompson (5–3)	**Jiménez** (1–3)	Sewald (12)	18,020	51–40	L1
92	July 11	@ Diamondbacks	0–1	Pfaadt (4–6)	**Fried** (7–5)	Sewald (13)	27,101	51–41	L2
93	July 12	@ Padres	6–1	**Schwellenbach** (3–4)	Waldron (5–8)	—	44,390	52–41	W1
94	July 13	@ Padres	0–4	Cease (8–8)	**López** (7–3)	—	43,097	52–42	L1
95	July 14	@ Padres	6–3	**Sale** (13–3)	Vásquez (2–5)	**Iglesias** (22)	42,132	53–42	W1
–	July 16	**94th All-Star Game: Arlington, TX**							
—	July 19	Cardinals	Postponed (rain); Makeup: July 20						
96	July 20 (1)	Cardinals	3–2 (10)	**Johnson** (3–1)	Roycroft (1–2)	—	37,042	54–42	W2
97	July 20 (2)	Cardinals	5–9	Gray (10–6)	**Elder** (1–4)	Leahy (1)	42,168	54–43	L1
98	July 21	Cardinals	2–6	Mikolas (8–8)	**Schwellenbach** (3–5)	—	36,348	54–44	L2
99	July 22	Reds	1–4	Greene (7–4)	**López** (7–4)	—	38,779	54–45	L3
—	July 23	Reds	Postponed (rain); Makeup: July 24						
100	July 24 (1)	Reds	4–9	Moll (2–1)	**Winans** (0–2)	—	34,407	54–46	L4
—	July 24 (2)	Reds	Postponed (rain); Makeup: September 9						
101	July 25	@ Mets	2–3 (10)	Maton (2–2)	**Johnson** (3–2)	—	34,087	54–47	L5
102	July 26	@ Mets	4–8	Senga (1–0)	**Morton** (5–6)	—	34,673	54–48	L6
103	July 27	@ Mets	4–0	**Schwellenbach** (4–5)	Megill (2–5)	—	35,149	55–48	W1
104	July 28	@ Mets	9–2	**Lee** (3–2)	Peterson (5–1)	—	26,916	56–48	W2
105	July 29	@ Brewers	3–8	Milner (4–2)	**Chavez** (1–2)	—	28,698	56–49	L1
106	July 30	@ Brewers	5–1	**Elder** (2–4)	Ross (2–5)	—	28,810	57–49	W1
107	July 31	@ Brewers	6–2	**Johnson** (4–2)	Koenig (8–3)	—	37,111	58–49	W2

August: 16–13 (Home: 6–7; Away: 10–6)

#	Date	Opponent	Score	Win	Loss	Save	Attendance	Record	Streak
108	August 1	Marlins	4–2	**Morton** (6–6)	Meyer (2–1)	**Iglesias** (23)	34,401	59–49	W3
109	August 2	Marlins	5–3	**Bummer** (3–2)	Faucher (2–3)	**Jiménez** (3)	37,726	60–49	W4
110	August 3	Marlins	3–4	Cronin (3–3)	**Johnson** (4–3)	Faucher (1)	40,479	60–50	L1
111	August 4	Marlins	0–7	Cabrera (2–3)	**Fried** (7–6)	—	33,146	60–51	L2
112	August 6	Brewers	0–10	Rea (10–3)	**Elder** (2–5)	—	38,701	60–52	L3
113	August 7	Brewers	5–8	Peralta (7–6)	**Johnson** (4–4)	—	33,281	60–53	L4
114	August 8	Brewers	7–16	Peguero (7–3)	**Morton** (6–7)	—	29,935	60–54	L5
115	August 9	@ Rockies	5–6	Kinley (5–1)	**Minter** (5–4)	Vodnik (7)	33,028	60–55	L6
116	August 10	@ Rockies	11–8	**Johnson** (5–4)	Chivilli (0–1)	**Iglesias** (24)	46,169	61–55	W1
117	August 11	@ Rockies	8–9	Rogers (2–0)	**Jiménez** (1–4)	Vodnik (8)	40,365	61–56	L1
118	August 12	@ Giants	1–0 (10)	**Iglesias** (2–1)	Rogers (1–4)	—	30,184	62–56	W1
119	August 13	@ Giants	4–3 (10)	**Lee** (4–2)	Rodríguez (3–2)	**Iglesias** (25)	30,468	63–56	W2
120	August 14	@ Giants	13–2	**Holmes** (1–0)	Ray (2–2)	—	27,460	64–56	W3
121	August 15	@ Giants	0–6	Webb (11–8)	**Fried** (7–7)	—	29,319	64–57	L1
122	August 16	@ Angels	2–3	Burke (1–0)	**Schwellenbach** (4–6)	Joyce (2)	37,736	64–58	L2
123	August 17	@ Angels	11–3	**Sale** (14–3)	Canning (4–11)	—	37,268	65–58	W1
124	August 18	@ Angels	3–1	**Morton** (7–7)	Kochanowicz (1–3)	**Iglesias** (26)	36,102	66–58	W2
125	August 20	Phillies	3–1	**Holmes** (2–0)	Wheeler (12–6)	**Iglesias** (27)	34,245	67–58	W3
126	August 21	Phillies	2–3	Strahm (5–2)	**Jiménez** (1–5)	Estévez (22)	33,231	67–59	L1
127	August 22	Phillies	3–2	**Schwellenbach** (5–6)	Sánchez (9–9)	**Iglesias** (28)	34,704	68–59	W1
128	August 23	Nationals	3–2 (10)	**Iglesias** (3–1)	Salazar (0–1)	—	37,203	69–59	W2
129	August 24	Nationals	4–2	**Bummer** (4–2)	Garcia (2–5)	**Johnson** (2)	40,230	70–59	W3
130	August 25	Nationals	1–5	Barnes (8–2)	**Jackson** (4–3)	Finnegan (32)	32,327	70–60	L1
131	August 26	@ Twins	10–6	**Fried** (8–7)	Ober (12–6)	—	18,974	71–60	W1
132	August 27	@ Twins	8–6 (10)	**Iglesias** (4–1)	Durán (6–8)	—	20,200	72–60	W2
133	August 28	@ Twins	5–1	**Sale** (15–3)	Festa (2–4)	—	19,142	73–60	W3
134	August 29	@ Phillies	4–5	Kerkering (3–2)	**Holmes** (2–1)	Hoffman (10)	40,451	73–61	L1
135	August 30	@ Phillies	7–2	**López** (8–4)	Suárez (11–6)	—	40,139	74–61	W1
136	August 31	@ Phillies	0–3	Wheeler (13–6)	**Fried** (8–8)	Estévez (23)	42,730	74–62	L1

September: 15–11 (Home: 10–7; Away: 5–4)

#	Date	Opponent	Score	Win	Loss	Save	Attendance	Record	Streak
137	September 1	@ Phillies	2–3 (11)	Estévez (3–4)	**Bummer** (4–3)	—	43,249	74–63	L2
138	September 3	Rockies	3–0	**Sale** (16–3)	Freeland (4–7)	**Iglesias** (29)	32,672	75–63	W1
139	September 4	Rockies	5–2	**Morton** (8–7)	Blalock (1–2)	**Iglesias** (30)	36,859	76–63	W2
140	September 5	Rockies	1–3	Gomber (5–10)	**López** (8–5)	Kinley (9)	32,811	76–64	L1
141	September 6	Blue Jays	3–1	**Fried** (9–8)	Gausman (12–11)	**Iglesias** (31)	37,230	77–64	W1
142	September 7	Blue Jays	5–9	Berríos (15–9)	**Schwellenbach** (5–7)	—	38,276	77–65	L1
143	September 8	Blue Jays	4–3 (11)	**Iglesias** (5–1)	Pop (1–4)	—	36,394	78–65	W1
144	September 9	Reds	0–1	Martinez (8–6)	**Morton** (8–8)	Díaz (27)	34,883	78–66	L1
145	September 10	@ Nationals	12–0	**Chavez** (2–2)	Gore (8–12)	—	17,668	79–66	W1
146	September 11	@ Nationals	1–5	Irvin (10–12)	**Fried** (9–9)	—	15,585	79–67	L1
147	September 13	Dodgers	6–2	**Schwellenbach** (6–7)	Knack (2–4)	—	40,339	80–67	W1
148	September 14	Dodgers	10–1	**Sale** (17–3)	Flaherty (12–7)	—	42,732	81–67	W2
149	September 15	Dodgers	2–9	Kopech (6–8)	**Iglesias** (5–2)	—	39,198	81–68	L1
150	September 16	Dodgers	0–9	Phillips (4–1)	**Fried** (9–10)	—	37,109	81–69	L2
151	September 17	@ Reds	5–6	Suter (1–0)	**Johnson** (5–5)	Díaz (28)	20,955	81–70	L3
152	September 18	@ Reds	7–1	**Schwellenbach** (7–7)	Santillan (2–3)	—	18,959	82–70	W1
153	September 19	@ Reds	15–3	**Sale** (18–3)	Aguiar (2–1)	—	20,071	83–70	W2
154	September 20	@ Marlins	3–4	Bellozo (3–4)	**Morton** (8–9)	Tinoco (2)	17,139	83–71	L1
155	September 21	@ Marlins	6–2	**Fried** (10–10)	Bachar (0–1)	—	25,225	84–71	W1
156	September 22	@ Marlins	5–4	**Johnson** (6–5)	Cronin (3–4)	**Iglesias** (32)	20,104	85–71	W2
157	September 24	Mets	5–1	**Schwellenbach** (8–7)	Severino (11–7)	—	40,103	86–71	W3
—	September 25	Mets	Postponed (Rain from Hurricane Helene); Makeup: September 30						
—	September 26	Mets	Postponed (Rain from Hurricane Helene); Makeup: September 30						
158	September 27	Royals	3–0	**Fried** (11–10)	Singer (9–13)	**Iglesias** (33)	36,212	87–71	W4
159	September 28	Royals	2–1	**Iglesias** (6–2)	Long (3–3)	—	38,775	88–71	W5
160	September 29	Royals	2–4	Marsh (9–9)	**Morton** (8–10)	Bubic (1)	39,043	88–72	L1
161	September 30 (1)	Mets	7–8	Díaz (6–4)	**Johnson** (6–6)	—	see 2nd game	88–73	L2
162	September 30 (2)	Mets	3–0	**Hernández** (3–0)	Lucchesi (0–2)	**Iglesias** (34)	41,561	89–73	W1

== Postseason ==
=== Game log ===
2024 Postseason Game Log: 0–2 (Home: 0–0; Away: 0–2)
NL Wild Card Series: 0–2 (Home: 0–0; Away: 0–2)

#	Date	Opponent	Score	Win	Loss	Save	Attendance	Series
1	October 1	@ Padres	0–4	King (1–0)	Smith-Shawver (0–1)	—	47,647	0–1
2	October 2	@ Padres	4–5	Hoeing (1–0)	Fried (0–1)	Suárez (1)	47,705	0–2

=== Postseason rosters ===
Playoff rosters
National League Wild Card Series

- Pitchers: 22 Luke Jackson 26 Raisel Iglesias 32 AJ Smith-Shawver 38 Pierce Johnson 40 Reynaldo López 49 Aaron Bummer 50 Charlie Morton 52 Dylan Lee 54 Max Fried 55 Bryce Elder 60 Jesse Chavez 62 Daysbel Hernández 77 Joe Jiménez
- Catchers: 12 Sean Murphy 16 Travis d'Arnaud
- Infielders: 1 Ozzie Albies 9 Gio Urshela 11 Orlando Arcia 15 Whit Merrifield 28 Matt Olson
- Outfielders: 2 Jorge Soler 18 Ramón Laureano 23 Michael Harris II 24 Jarred Kelenic 36 Eli White
- Designated hitters: 20 Marcell Ozuna

== Roster ==
2024 Atlanta Braves
Roster
Pitchers: 59 John Brebbia; 49 Aaron Bummer; 60 Jesse Chavez; 46 Dylan Dodd; 74 Parker Dunshee; 55 Bryce Elder; 54 Max Fried; 64 Jimmy Herget; 62 Daysbel Hernández; 66 Grant Holmes; 26 Raisel Iglesias; 22 Luke Jackson; 77 Joe Jiménez; 38 Pierce Johnson; 58 Ray Kerr; 52 Dylan Lee; 40 Reynaldo López; 68 Tyler Matzek; 33 A. J. Minter; 50 Charlie Morton; 51 Chris Sale; 56 Spencer Schwellenbach; 32 AJ Smith-Shawver; 53 Jackson Stephens; 99 Spencer Strider; 61 Darius Vines; 30 Hurston Waldrep; 72 Allan Winans	Catchers: 16 Travis d'Arnaud; 12 Sean Murphy; 45 Chadwick Tromp; Infielders: 1 Ozzie Albies; 17 Nacho Alvarez Jr.; 11 Orlando Arcia; 8 Cavan Biggio; 22 David Fletcher; 15 Luis Guillorme; 15 Whit Merrifield; 28 Matt Olson; 27 Austin Riley; 59 Zack Short; 9 Gio Urshela; 65 Luke Williams	Outfielders: 13 Ronald Acuña Jr.; 15 Brian Anderson; 14 Adam Duvall; 23 Michael Harris II; 24 Jarred Kelenic; 18 Ramón Laureano; 63 J. P. Martínez; 8 Eddie Rosario; 2,21 Jorge Soler; 37 Forrest Wall; 36 Eli White; Other batters: 20 Marcell Ozuna	Manager: 43 Brian Snitker; Coaches: 85 Erick Abreu (bullpen); 57 Sal Fasano (catching coach); 88 Tom Goodwin (first base); 10 Chipper Jones (hitting consultant); 39 Rick Kranitz (pitching); 97 Jimmy Leo (bullpen catcher); 70 Bobby Magallanes (assistant hitting); 95 Eddie Pérez (assistant); 98 Tomás Pérez (batting practice pitcher); 34 Kevin Seitzer (hitting); 89 Matt Tuiasosopo (third base); 4 Walt Weiss (bench); 96 José Yepez (bullpen catcher)

== Player stats ==
= Indicates team leader

= Indicates league leader

=== Batting ===
Note: G = Games played; AB = At bats; R = Runs scored; H = Hits; 2B = Doubles; 3B = Triples; HR = Home runs; RBI = Runs batted in; SB = Stolen bases; BB = Walks; AVG = Batting average; SLG = Slugging average

Player	G	AB	R	H	2B	3B	HR	RBI	SB	BB	AVG	SLG
Marcell Ozuna	162	606	96	183	31	0	39	104	1	74	.302	.546
Matt Olson	162	600	78	148	37	1	29	98	0	71	.247	.457
Orlando Arcia	157	551	50	120	24	0	17	46	2	41	.218	.354
Michael Harris II	110	440	58	116	14	3	16	48	10	23	.264	.418
Austin Riley	110	425	63	109	26	2	19	56	0	37	.256	.461
Jarred Kelenic	131	412	49	95	18	2	15	45	7	32	.231	.393
Ozzie Albies	99	399	52	100	29	1	10	53	8	27	.251	.404
Travis d'Arnaud	99	307	40	73	16	0	15	48	1	24	.238	.436
Adam Duvall	104	303	29	55	10	0	11	30	0	21	.182	.323
Sean Murphy	72	233	19	45	5	1	10	25	0	27	.193	.352
Ramón Laureano	67	216	28	64	13	1	10	29	5	8	.296	.505
Ronald Acuña Jr.	49	192	38	48	8	1	4	15	16	27	.250	.365
Jorge Soler	49	152	27	37	11	0	9	24	0	24	.243	.493
Whit Merrifield	42	137	23	34	5	2	1	4	6	20	.248	.336
Gio Urshela	36	132	9	35	9	0	4	15	0	4	.265	.424
Eddie Rosario	24	78	7	12	1	0	3	9	1	3	.154	.282
Zack Short	30	54	9	8	3	0	0	5	2	12	.148	.204
Chadwick Tromp	19	52	3	13	6	0	0	6	0	1	.250	.365
Luke Williams	34	46	8	9	3	0	0	4	3	4	.196	.261
Eli White	35	39	9	11	1	1	1	4	3	1	.282	.436
Nacho Alvarez Jr.	8	30	1	3	0	0	0	0	0	0	.100	.100
Forrest Wall	13	29	3	7	0	0	0	1	3	3	.241	.241
Luis Guillorme	9	20	2	3	2	0	0	3	0	1	.150	.250
J.P. Martínez	7	10	2	2	1	0	0	0	1	0	.200	.300
David Fletcher	5	8	0	2	0	0	0	2	0	0	.250	.250
Brian Anderson	3	5	0	0	0	0	0	0	0	0	.000	.000
Cavan Biggio	4	5	1	1	0	0	0	0	0	0	.200	.200
Team totals	162	5481	704	1333	273	15	213	674	69	'485	.243	.415

Source:Baseball Reference

=== Pitching ===
Note: W = Wins; L = Losses; ERA = Earned run average; G = Games pitched; GS = Games started; SV = Saves; IP = Innings pitched; H = Hits allowed; R = Runs allowed; ER = Earned runs allowed; BB = Walks allowed; SO = Strikeouts

Player	W	L	ERA	G	GS	SV	IP	H	R	ER	BB	SO
Chris Sale	18	3	2.38	29	29	0	177.2	141	48	47	39	225
Max Fried	11	10	3.25	29	29	0	174.1	146	71	63	57	166
Charlie Morton	8	10	4.19	30	30	0	165.1	154	85	77	65	167
Reynaldo López	8	5	1.99	26	25	0	135.2	108	32	30	42	148
Spencer Schwellenbach	8	7	3.35	21	21	0	123.2	106	49	46	23	127
Raisel Iglesias	6	2	1.95	66	0	34	69.1	38	19	15	13	68
Joe Jiménez	1	5	2.62	69	0	3	68.2	45	22	20	23	82
Grant Holmes	2	1	3.56	26	7	0	68.1	66	27	27	15	70
Jesse Chavez	2	2	3.13	46	0	0	63.1	60	27	22	19	55
Dylan Lee	4	2	2.11	52	0	0	59.2	49	19	14	17	76
Pierce Johnson	6	6	3.67	58	0	2	56.1	48	25	23	25	67
Aaron Bummer	4	3	3.58	56	0	0	55.1	61	24	22	18	69
Bryce Elder	2	5	6.52	10	10	0	49.2	64	37	36	17	46
A.J. Minter	5	4	2.62	39	0	1	34.1	24	10	10	11	35
Ray Kerr	1	2	5.64	10	2	0	22.1	29	14	14	7	27
Luke Jackson	0	1	4.50	16	0	0	18.0	17	11	9	11	26
Daysbel Hernández	3	0	2.50	16	0	0	18.0	10	6	5	10	26
Darius Vines	0	1	8.56	4	2	0	13.2	21	14	13	4	9
Jimmy Herget	0	1	4.38	8	0	0	12.1	13	6	6	3	15
Tyler Matzek	0	0	9.90	11	0	0	10.0	16	11	11	3	10
Spencer Strider	0	0	7.00	2	2	0	9.0	10	7	7	5	12
Allan Winans	0	2	15.26	2	2	0	7.2	14	14	13	4	4
Hurston Waldrep	0	1	16.71	2	2	0	7.0	9	13	13	8	3
John Brebbia	0	0	2.70	5	0	0	6.2	4	2	2	2	9
AJ Smith-Shawver	0	0	0.00	1	1	0	4.1	3	0	0	2	4
Luke Williams	0	0	4.50	3	0	0	4.0	5	2	2	1	0
Jackson Stephens	0	0	2.70	3	0	0	3.1	5	1	1	1	2
Parker Dunshee	0	0	19.29	1	0	0	2.1	4	5	5	2	3
Dylan Dodd	0	0	9.00	1	0	0	2.0	4	2	2	1	2
Luis Guillorme	0	0	36.00	1	0	0	1.0	3	4	4	1	0
Team totals	89	73	3.49	162	162	40	1443.1	1277	607	559	449	1553

Source:Baseball Reference

== Farm system ==
Level	Team	League	Manager
AAA	Gwinnett Stripers	International League	
AA	Mississippi Braves	Southern League	
High-A	Rome Emperors	South Atlantic League	
A	Augusta GreenJackets	Carolina League	
Rookie	FCL Braves	Florida Complex League	
Rookie	DSL Braves	Dominican Summer League	
