= Ray Kerr =

American baseball player (born 1994)

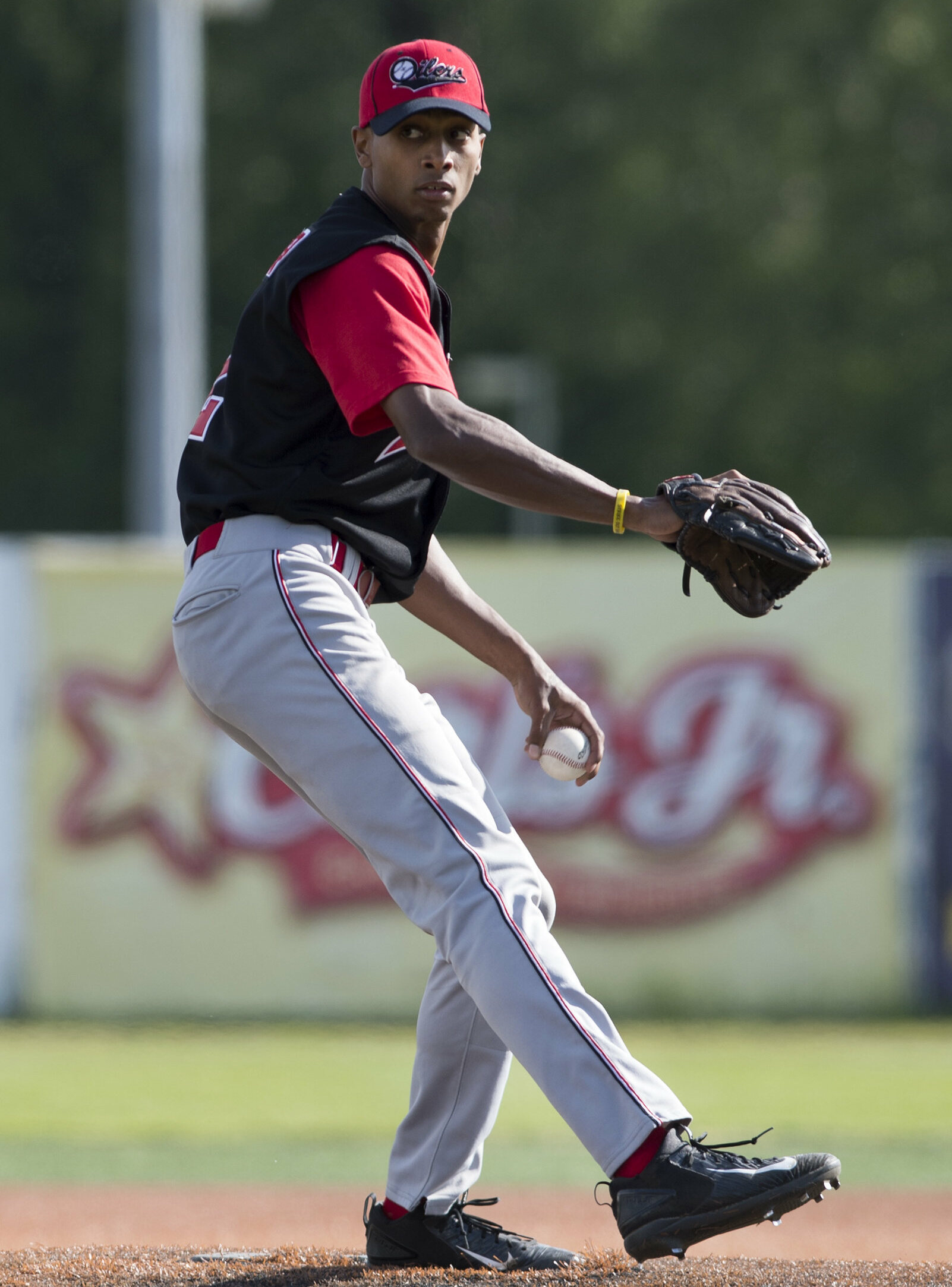
- Kerr with the Peninsula Oilers in 2017

Atlanta Braves – No. 62
- Pitcher
- Born: September 10, 1994 (age 32); Sacramento, California, U.S.
- Bats: Left Throws: Left

MLB debut
- April 24, 2022, for the San Diego Padres

MLB statistics (through 2026 season)
- Win–loss record: 2–3
- Earned run average: 4.33
- Strikeouts: 76
- Stats at Baseball Reference

Teams
- San Diego Padres (2022–2023); Atlanta Braves (2024, 2026–present)

Raymond Alexander Kerr (born September 10, 1994) is an American professional baseball pitcher for the Atlanta Braves of Major League Baseball (MLB). He has previously played in MLB for the San Diego Padres.

== Amateur career ==
Kerr graduated from Hug High School in Reno, Nevada, in 2013. He played college baseball for Mendocino College for two years and then quit baseball, returning home to work at a movie theater and a 7-Eleven. The new college baseball coach at Lassen Community College convinced him to join his team. He played collegiate summer baseball for the Peninsula Oilers in the Alaska Baseball League in 2017, where he reached 93 miles per hour (150 km/h) with his fastball.

== Professional career ==
=== Seattle Mariners ===
Kerr signed with the Seattle Mariners of Major League Baseball as an undrafted free agent on August 24, 2017. He made his professional debut with the Single-A Clinton LumberKings in 2018, logging a 5–11 record and 4.28 ERA with 101 strikeouts across 25 starts. In 2019, Kerr split the season between the High-A Modesto Nuts and the Triple-A Tacoma Rainiers, posting a 4–7 record and 3.82 ERA with 95 strikeouts in 92.0 innings of work across 36 total appearances. Kerr did not play in a game in 2020 due to the cancellation of the minor league season because of the COVID-19 pandemic. He split the 2021 campaign between the Double-A Arkansas Travelers and Tacoma, pitching to a 3.18 ERA with 60 strikeouts in 36 appearances. The Mariners added him to their 40-man roster to protect him from the Rule 5 draft following the season on November 19, 2021.

=== San Diego Padres ===
On November 27, 2021, the Mariners traded Kerr and outfielder Corey Rosier to the San Diego Padres in exchange for Adam Frazier. He was assigned to the Triple-A El Paso Chihuahuas to begin the 2022 season.

On April 22, 2022, Kerr was promoted to the majors for the first time to replace the injured Pierce Johnson. He made his major league debut on April 24. He appeared in seven games for San Diego in his rookie campaign, pitching to a 9.00 ERA with three strikeouts in five innings pitched.

Kerr was optioned to Triple-A El Paso to begin the 2023 season.

=== Atlanta Braves ===
On December 15, 2023, the Padres traded Kerr, Matt Carpenter, and cash considerations to the Atlanta Braves in exchange for Drew Campbell. He was optioned to the Triple–A Gwinnett Stripers to begin the 2024 season. On May 7, 2024, Kerr was selected to the active roster following an injury to Tyler Matzek. On May 24, Kerr made his first career start against the Pittsburgh Pirates. In 10 games, he recorded a 5.64 ERA with 27 strikeouts across 22 1/3 innings pitched. On June 24, it was announced that Kerr would require Tommy John surgery, ending his season. On November 22, the Braves non–tendered Kerr, making him a free agent.

On November 26, 2024, Kerr re–signed with the Braves on a minor league contract. He missed the entire 2025 season due to injury. After returning in 2026, Kerr posted a 3.09 ERA with 16 strikeouts in nine minor league outings before being selected to Atlanta's active roster on August 16, 2026.

Kerr served as the Braves' opener in Game 3 of the 2026 National League Wild Card Series against the Philadelphia Phillies, pitching 3 1/3 scoreless innings in his postseason debut as Atlanta won 6–2. He also opened for the Braves in Game 2 of the 2026 National League Division Series against the Los Angeles Dodgers.
