= Tyler Thomas (baseball) =

American baseball player (born 1995)

Piratas de Campeche – No. 7
- Pitcher
- Born: December 22, 1995 (age 30); San Diego, California, U.S.
- Bats: Right Throws: Left

Ricky Tyler Thomas (born December 22, 1995) is an American professional baseball pitcher for the Piratas de Campeche of the Mexican League.

== Amateur career ==
Thomas attended Mira Mesa Senior High School in San Diego. He enrolled at California State University, Fresno, and played college baseball for the Fresno State Bulldogs.

== Professional career ==
=== Chicago Cubs ===
The Chicago Cubs drafted Thomas in the seventh round, with the 225th overall selection, of the 2017 Major League Baseball draft and he signed, receiving a $175,000 bonus. Thomas made his professional debut with the Low–A Eugene Emeralds, where he was 1–0 with a 2.33 ERA with 24 strikeouts across 19 1/3relief innings pitched. He began 2018 with the Single–A South Bend Cubs, posting a 3-5 record and 2.88 ERA with 81 strikeouts over 15 appearances (14 starts).

=== Texas Rangers ===
On July 19, 2018, the Cubs traded Thomas to the Texas Rangers in exchange for Jesse Chavez. The Rangers assigned him to the Single–A Hickory Crawdads and promoted him to the High–A Down East Wood Ducks in August. In 22 games (twenty starts) between South Bend, Hickory, and the Wood Ducks, Thomas compiled a 3–9 record with a 3.00 ERA over 105 innings. Thomas was assigned back to Down East for the 2019 season, going 0–2 with a 5.19 ERA over just 8 2/3 innings due to a non-disclosed injury. Thomas did not play in a game in 2020 due to the cancellation of the minor league season because of the COVID-19 pandemic. In 2021, Thomas split the season pitching for the Hickory Crawdads, Double–A Frisco RoughRiders, and Triple–A Round Rock Express, going 3–3 with a 3.66 ERA. In 2022, Thomas posted a 2–1 record with a 6.14 ERA between Frisco and Round Rock, before he was released on August 16, 2022.

=== Gastonia Honey Hunters ===
On April 12, 2023, Thomas signed with the Gastonia Honey Hunters of the Atlantic League of Professional Baseball. He made 15 appearances for Gastonia, registering a pristine 0.90 ERA with 34 strikeouts and 1 save in 20.0 innings pitched.

=== New York Mets ===
On June 6, 2023, Thomas signed a minor league contract with the New York Mets organization. Thomas appeared in 24 games between Double-A Binghamton Rumble Ponies and Triple-A Syracuse Mets where he compiled a 2-0 record and 2.86 ERA with 41 strikeouts in 34 2/3 innings pitched.

=== Los Angeles Angels ===
On December 6, 2023, the Atlanta Braves selected Thomas in the minor league phase of the Rule 5 draft. Two days later, the Braves traded Thomas and Evan White to the Los Angeles Angels in exchange for David Fletcher and Max Stassi. He appeared in 31 games (2 starts) for the Triple–A Salt Lake Bees, compiling a 1-2 record and 5.44 ERA with 45 strikeouts in 44 2/3 innings pitched. On July 31, 2024, Thomas was released by the Angels organization.

=== Piratas de Campeche ===
On April 19, 2025, Thomas signed with the Piratas de Campeche of the Mexican League.

== See also ==
- Rule 5 draft results
