= Evan White =

American baseball player (born 1996)

Free agent
- First baseman
- Born: April 26, 1996 (age 30); Columbus, Ohio, U.S.
- Bats: Right Throws: Left

MLB debut
- July 24, 2020, for the Seattle Mariners

MLB statistics (through 2021 season)
- Batting average: .165
- Home runs: 10
- Runs batted in: 35
- Stats at Baseball Reference

Teams
- Seattle Mariners (2020–2021)

Career highlights and awards
- Gold Glove Award (2020)

Evan McKee White (born April 26, 1996) is an American professional baseball first baseman who is a free agent. He has previously played in Major League Baseball (MLB) for the Seattle Mariners and won the Gold Glove Award in 2020. He played college baseball for the Kentucky Wildcats.

== Amateur career ==
White attended Lincoln High School in Gahanna, Ohio, and the University of Kentucky, where he played college baseball for the Wildcats.

As a freshman, White started all 52 games and hit .318/.369/.410 with two home runs and 28 runs batted in (RBIs). As a sophomore in 2016, White started all 54 games, hitting .376/.419./.535 with five home runs and 40 RBIs. After the season, he played for the United States collegiate national team. He hit .250 in 16 games.

== Professional career ==
=== Seattle Mariners ===
Considered one of the top prospects for the 2017 Major League Baseball draft, the Seattle Mariners selected White with the 17th overall selection. He was assigned to the Everett AquaSox where he posted a .277 batting average with three home runs, 12 RBIs and a .877 OPS in 14 games. In 2018, White played with the Modesto Nuts and the Tacoma Rainiers, slashing a combined .300/.371/.453 with 11 home runs and 66 RBIs in 124 games. He spent 2019 with the Arkansas Travelers, batting .293/.350/.488 with 18 home runs and 55 RBIs over 92 games. White was named to the 2019 All-Star Futures Game.

On November 25, 2019, White signed a six-year major league contract (with three club options) with the Mariners. The contract guaranteed White $24 million and could have reached $55.5 million. On July 24, 2020, White was the starting first baseman, making his MLB debut on Opening Day. He finished the season with a .176 batting average, the lowest among all qualifying hitters in the shortened 60-game season, and a .252 on base percentage, also the lowest, along with eight home runs and 26 RBIs in 54 games. He won a Gold Glove Award in 2020 at first base.

On June 22, 2021, White was placed on the 60-day injured list with a left hip flexor strain and was sent for a second opinion on the injury. White elected to undergo season-ending hip surgery on July 16.

On March 26, 2022, it was announced that White would undergo surgery to repair a sports hernia. On April 28, White was transferred to the 60-day injured list as he continued to recover.

White was optioned to Triple-A Tacoma to begin the 2023 season. On April 6, it was announced that White had suffered a Grade 2 groin strain while playing with Tacoma and would miss two months of action. On May 9, it was announced that White would undergo another procedure on his left hip, causing him to miss three months.

=== Los Angeles Angels ===
On December 3, 2023, the Mariners traded White, Marco Gonzales, and Jarred Kelenic to the Atlanta Braves for Jackson Kowar and Cole Phillips. On December 7, White was removed from the 40-man roster and sent outright to Triple-A. The next day, the Braves traded White and Tyler Thomas to the Los Angeles Angels for David Fletcher and Max Stassi. He made only two appearances for the rookie-level Arizona Complex League Angels during the 2024 season, going 0-for-2 with one walk.

White did not make an appearance for the Angels organization in 2025. He elected free agency following the season on November 6.

== Personal life ==
White and his wife married in December 2019.
