= Max Stassi =

American baseball player and coach (born 1991)

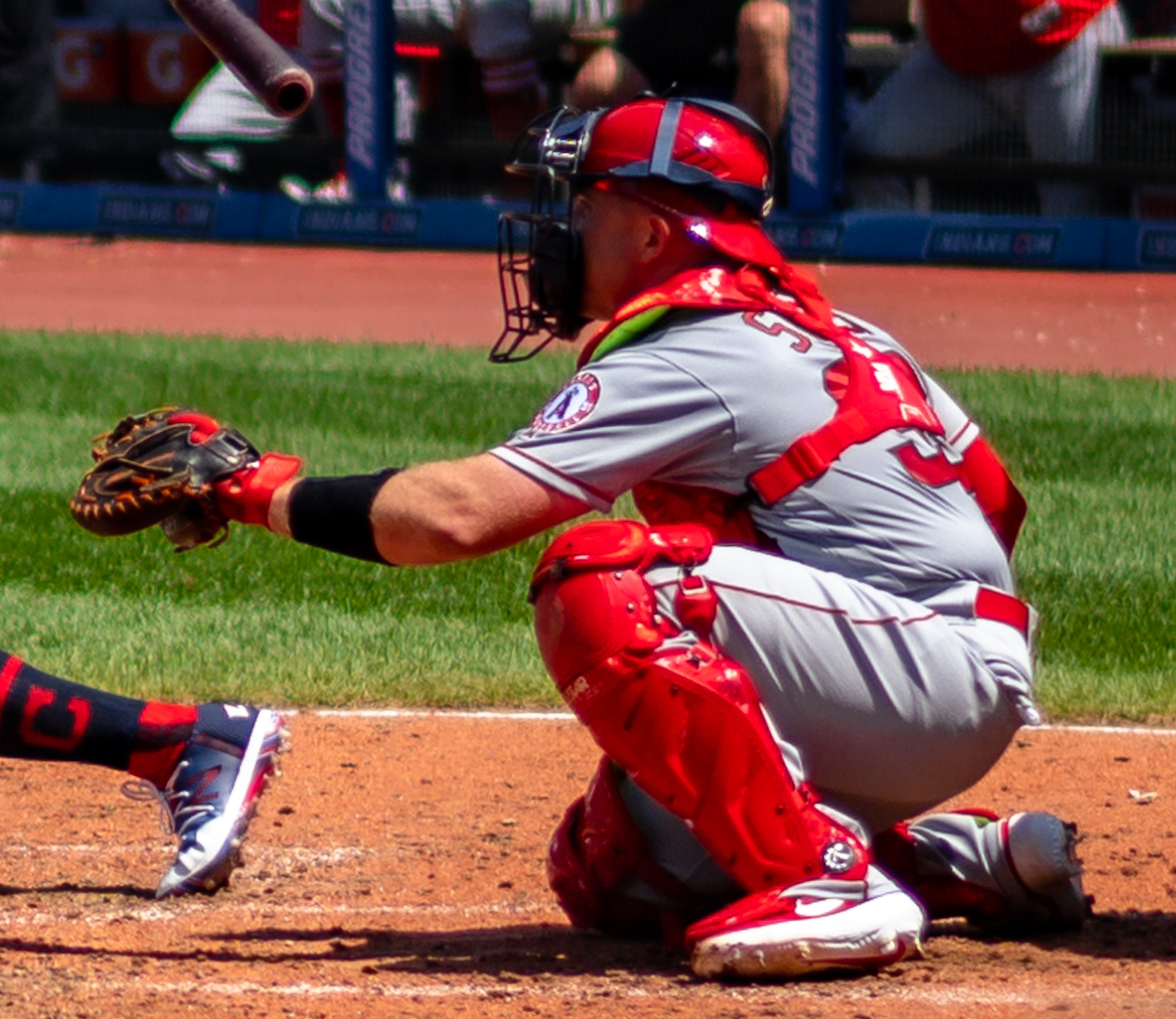
- Stassi with the Los Angeles Angels in 2019

Los Angeles Angels – No. 83
- Catcher / Coach
- Born: March 15, 1991 (age 35); Yuba City, California, U.S.
- Batted: Right Threw: Right

MLB debut
- August 20, 2013, for the Houston Astros

Last MLB appearance
- October 5, 2022, for the Los Angeles Angels

MLB statistics
- Batting average: .212
- Home runs: 41
- Runs batted in: 128
- Stats at Baseball Reference

Teams
- As player: Houston Astros (2013–2019); Los Angeles Angels (2019–2022); As coach: Los Angeles Angels (2026–present)
Medals
Men's baseball
Representing United States
World Junior Baseball Championship
Silver medal – second place	2008 Edmonton	Team

Max Robert Stassi (born March 15, 1991) is an American former professional baseball catcher and current catching coach for the Los Angeles Angels of Major League Baseball (MLB). The Oakland Athletics drafted him in the fourth round of the 2009 MLB draft. In 2013, Stassi made his MLB debut with the Houston Astros. The Astros traded Stassi to the Angels in 2019.

== Early life ==
Stassi attended Yuba City High School in Yuba City, California. He played for his school's baseball team, and was twice named The Sacramento Bee's player of the year. Stassi also competed for the United States national baseball team, winning gold in the 2006 Pan American Games in Barquisimeto, Venezuela, and the International Baseball Federation's 16 and Under Baseball World Championship in 2007. He finished his high school career with a .514 batting average, 40 home runs, and 162 runs batted in (RBIs). Stassi committed to attend the University of California, Los Angeles (UCLA), to play college baseball for the UCLA Bruins.

== Playing career ==
=== Oakland Athletics ===
==== Minor leagues ====
Heading into the 2009 Major League Baseball draft, Sporting News called Stassi the best available high school catcher. Stassi made it clear that he expected a large signing bonus to agree to a professional contract. A potential first round pick, Stassi was not selected in the first three rounds, which Baseball America called "one of the biggest surprises" of the draft. The Oakland Athletics selected Stassi in the fourth round, with the 123rd overall selection, of the draft. He received a $1.5 million bonus, a record for a fourth round pick, forgoing his commitment to UCLA. Stassi also negotiated in his contract that the Athletics would invite him to spring training with the major league team in 2010.

Stassi spent his first pro season with the Vancouver Canadians of the Low–A Northwest League and the rookie–level Arizona League Athletics, and batted .280/.346/.360 with no home runs and eight RBI. In 2010, he was assigned to the Kane County Cougars of the Single–A Midwest League, where he batted .229/.310/.380 with 13 home runs and 51 RBI over 110 appearances.

In 2011, Stassi played for the Stockton Ports of the High–A California League, batting .231/.331/.331 with two home runs and 19 RBI, but missed the end of the season with shoulder surgery. The Athletics invited him to spring training in 2012. He batted .268 with 15 home runs and 45 RBI in 84 games with Stockton during the 2012 season.

=== Houston Astros ===
On February 4, 2013, the Athletics traded Stassi to the Houston Astros with Brad Peacock and Chris Carter for Jed Lowrie and Fernando Rodriguez. Playing for the Corpus Christi Hooks of the Double–A Texas League in 2013, Stassi hit home runs in five consecutive games in July. He was named the Texas League's player of the week twice in July, and was named the Texas League's player of month for July.

==== Major leagues ====
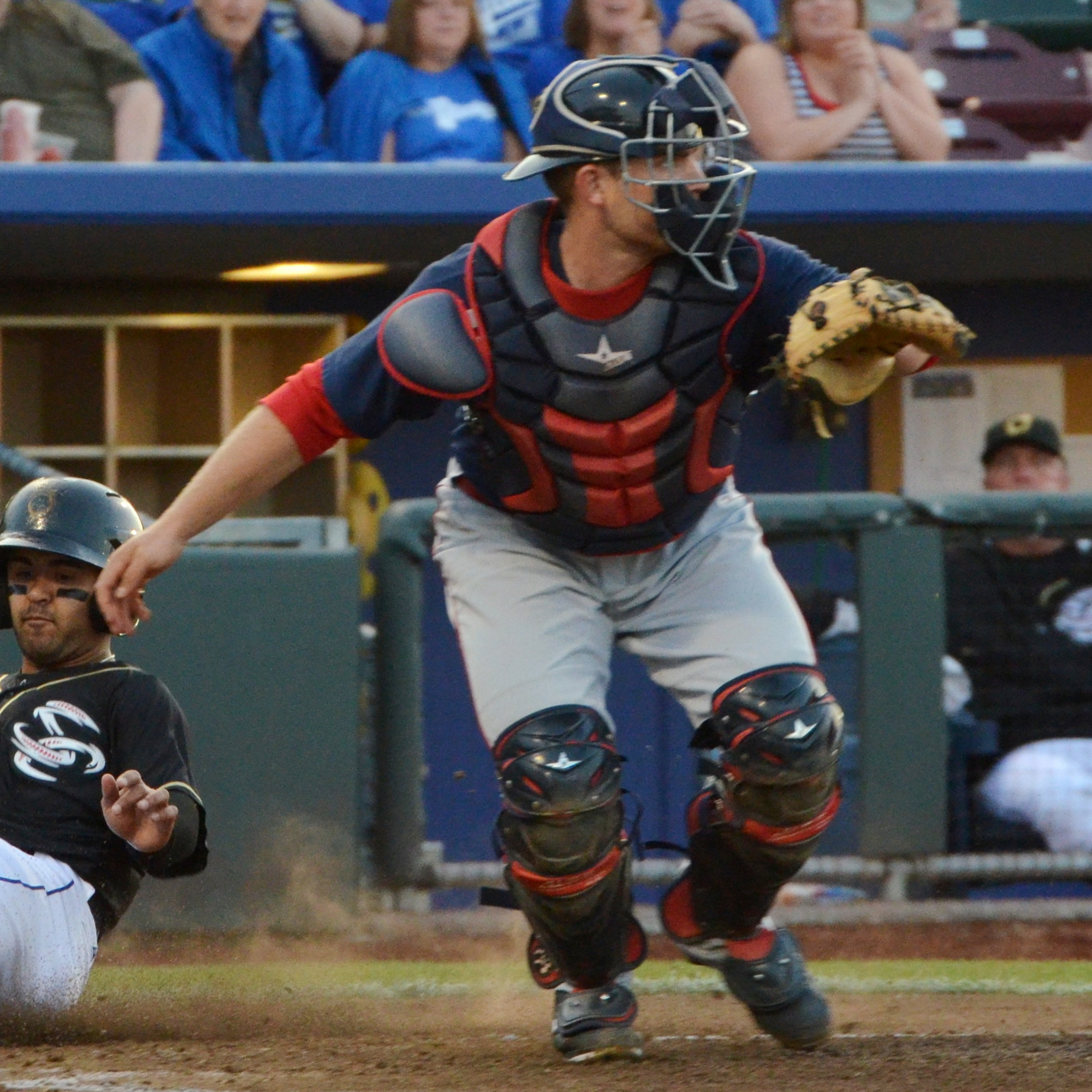
Stassi playing for the Oklahoma City RedHawks in 2014

The Astros promoted Stassi to the majors on August 20, 2013, to serve as a backup to Jason Castro when the Astros placed Carlos Corporán on the disabled list. Making his MLB debut that day, he recorded two hits. In his second MLB game, Stassi was hit in the face by a 96 miles per hour (154 km/h) fastball, which resulted in his being placed on the disabled list. Since the bases were loaded at the time he was plunked, he earned his first major-league RBI. Stassi began the 2014 season with the Oklahoma City RedHawks of the Triple–A Pacific Coast League (PCL). He finished the season with the Houston Astros, batting .350 (7-for-20) and driving in four runs in seven games played.

Stassi played for the Fresno Grizzlies of the PCL in 2015, batting .211/.279/.384, before being promoted to the major leagues in August due to an injury to Castro. He played in 11 games for the Astros. Following the offseason trade of Hank Conger, Stassi entered spring training in 2016 expected to become the backup to Castro. In March, he had surgery on a fractured hamate bone in his left wrist. The Astros activated Stassi from the disabled list in May and optioned him to Fresno, where he batted 230/.294/.374.

The Astros removed Stassi from their 40-man roster in March 2017. He played for Fresno before the Astros promoted him to the major leagues when Brian McCann was injured on August 14. Stassi went on the disabled list on August 25 with left hand inflammation caused by a blister. In 14 games in 2017, Stassi finished with 2 home runs and 4 RBIs and batted .167/.323/.458. Stassi was not on the team's postseason roster as the team went on to win the 2017 World Series.

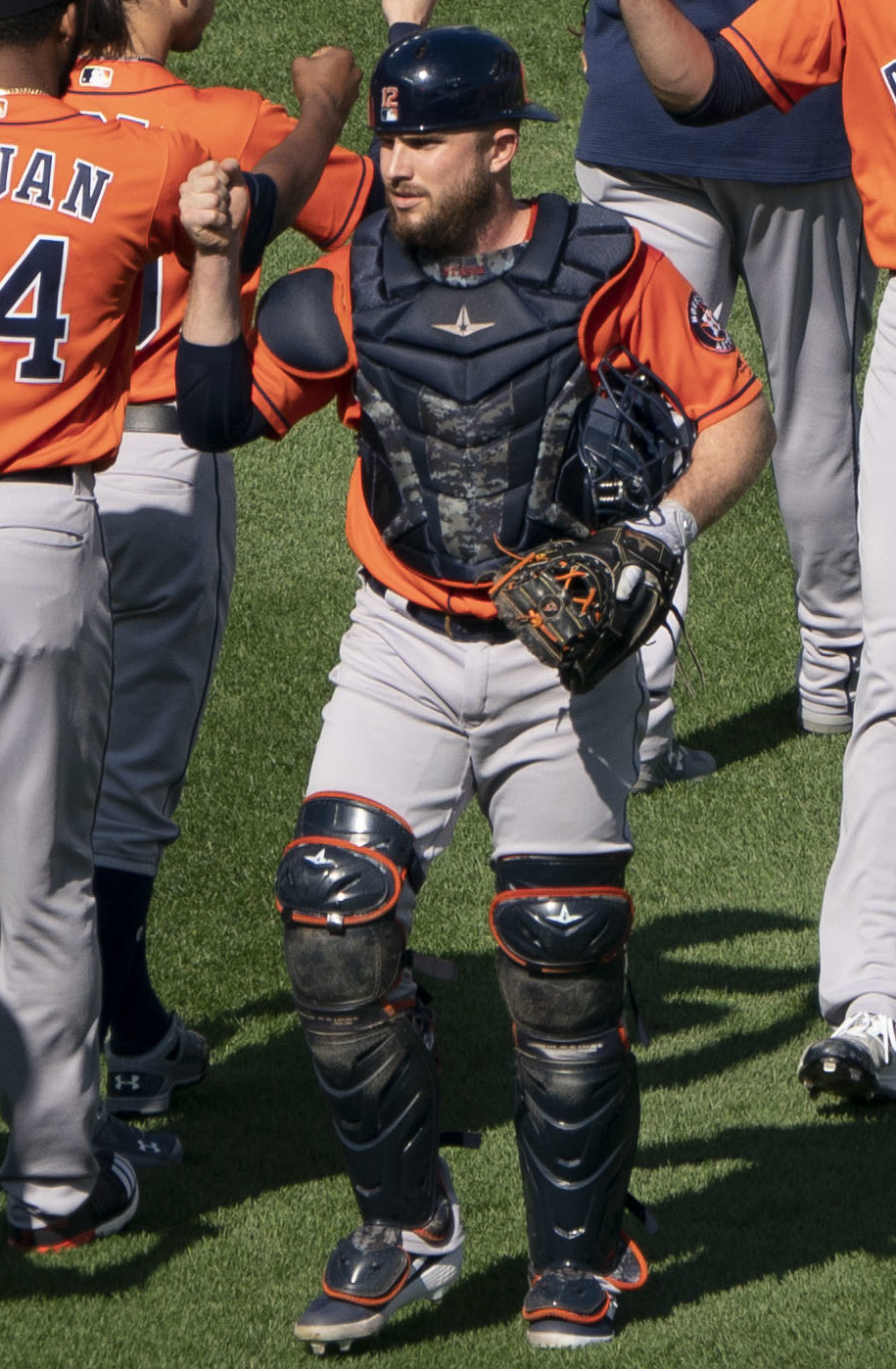
Stassi playing for the Houston Astros in 2018

Stassi was named to the Astros' Opening Day roster in 2018 as a backup to McCann. In 221 at bats in 2018 he batted .226/.316/.394. On June 26, Stassi came into the game as pitcher in the 9th inning in a blowout loss to the Pittsburgh Pirates.

In 2019, Stassi had a limited role with the Astros as a backup catcher to Robinson Chirinos and only appeared in 31 games where he had just 15 hits in 90 at-bats with one homerun and three RBIs.

=== Los Angeles Angels ===
On July 31, 2019, the Astros traded Stassi to the Los Angeles Angels in exchange for minor leaguers Rainier Rivas and Raider Uceta. In 2020, on defense he led major league catchers in stolen bases allowed, with 32. On the offensive side, he hit .278 with 7 home runs and 20 RBIs.

On June 14, 2021, Stassi earned the American League Player of the Week Award after hitting .455 (10-for-22) with three home runs, three doubles, eight RBIs and a 1.478 OPS in five games for the previous week. In 87 games, Stassi batted .241/.326/.426 and set career–highs in home runs (13) and RBIs (35).

Stassi and the Angels agreed to a three-year contract extension worth $17.5 million on March 24, 2022. Stassi played in a career–high 102 games for the Angels in 2022, hitting .180/.267/.303 with 9 home runs and 30 RBIs. On defensive side, Stassi led American League Fielding in Double Plays Turned as C (Double Plays as Defender).

In 2023, Stassi suffered a hip strain during a spring training game, and was placed on the injured list to begin the season. He was transferred to the 60–day injured list on June 10, 2023. Stassi announced in September that he would not return to the Angels that season due to a medical issue with his family, and the Angels placed him on the restricted list, forfeiting the remainder of Stassi's $7 million salary for the 2023 season.

=== Chicago White Sox ===
On December 8, 2023, the Angels traded Stassi and David Fletcher to the Atlanta Braves in exchange for Evan White and Tyler Thomas. The following day, the Braves traded him to the Chicago White Sox for a player to be named later. Stassi began the 2024 season on the injured list with hip inflammation. While rehabbing, he was hit on the hand by a backswing, and he was later transferred to the 60–day injured list on April 15, 2024. On June 10, it was announced that Stassi had undergone a season–ending left hip surfacing procedure. On November 1, the White Sox declined his 2025 option making him a free agent.

=== San Francisco Giants ===
On November 24, 2024, Stassi signed a minor league contract with the San Francisco Giants. He made 20 appearances for the Triple-A Sacramento River Cats, batting .265/.405/.382 with one home run, 18 RBI, and one stolen base. Stassi elected free agency following the season on November 6, 2025.

== Coaching career ==
On November 12, 2025, Stassi was hired to serve as the catching coach for the Los Angeles Angels.

== Personal life ==
Stassi's father, grandfather, and great-grandfather played as catchers in minor league baseball. His father, Jim, coached him at Yuba City. Max's grand-uncle, Myril Hoag, played in three World Series, batting .320 in them. His brother, Brock Stassi, has also played in MLB. Max and Brock Stassi have raised more than $100,000 with an annual charity event held in Yuba City, called "Homers for the Hungry." The money goes to local food banks.
