= David Fletcher (baseball) =

American baseball player (born 1994)

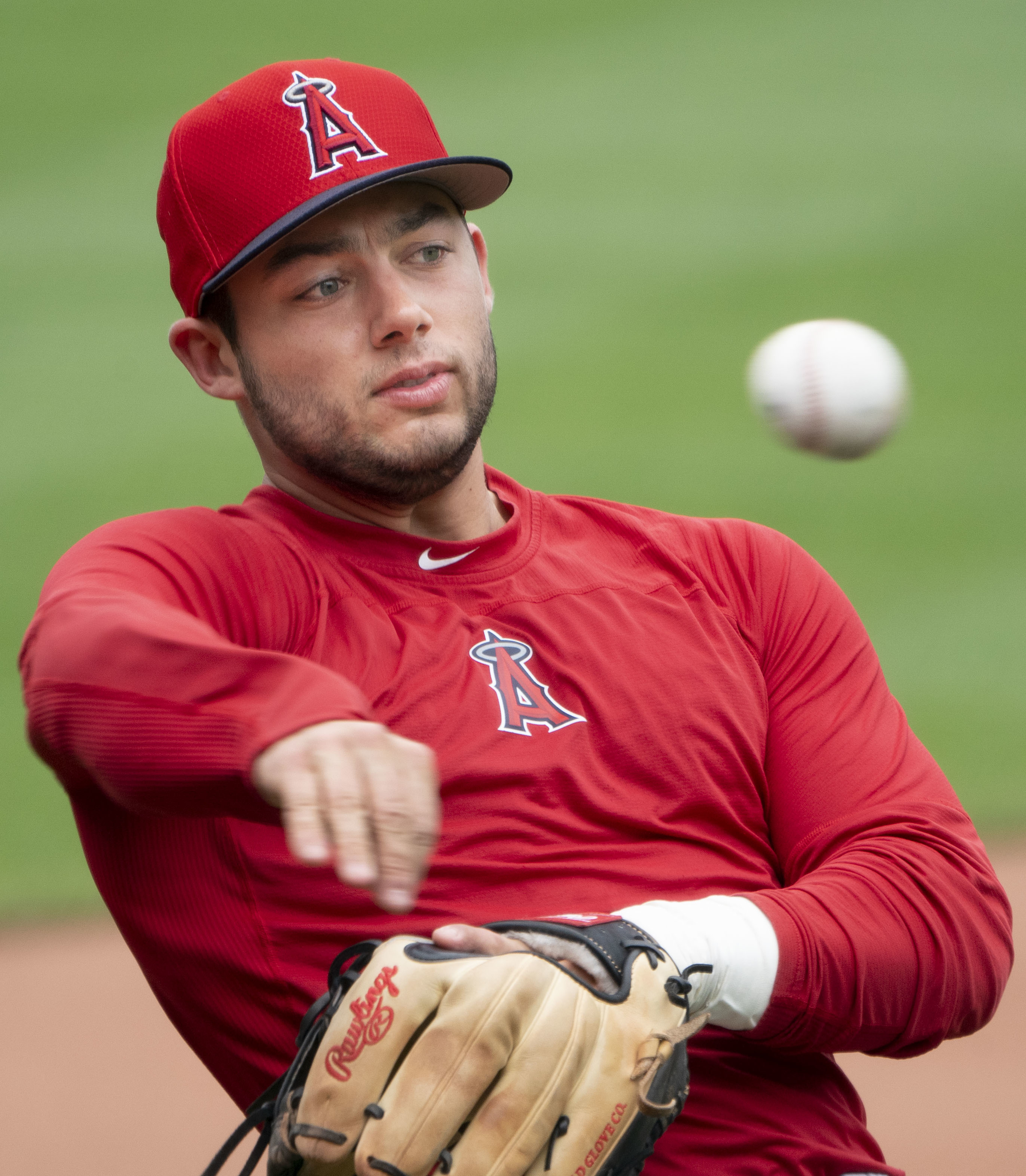
- Fletcher with the Los Angeles Angels in 2019
- Infielder
- Born: May 31, 1994 (age 32); Orange, California, U.S.
- Batted: Right Threw: Right

MLB debut
- June 13, 2018, for the Los Angeles Angels

Last MLB appearance
- April 24, 2024, for the Atlanta Braves

MLB statistics
- Batting average: .276
- Home runs: 16
- Runs batted in: 170
- Stats at Baseball Reference

Teams
- Los Angeles Angels (2018–2023); Atlanta Braves (2024)

David Owen Fletcher (born May 31, 1994) is an American former professional baseball infielder. He played in Major League Baseball (MLB) for the Los Angeles Angels and Atlanta Braves from 2018 to 2024.

Fletcher was born in Orange, California, and attended Cypress High School in Cypress, California. After four varsity seasons with Cypress, Fletcher played two seasons of college baseball for Loyola Marymount University. He was drafted by the Angels in the sixth round of the 2015 MLB draft. He made his MLB debut in 2018 and served as a utility player for his first three seasons before becoming a more permanent middle infielder in 2021.

Considered a contact hitter, Fletcher frequently served as the leadoff batter in front of Mike Trout and Shohei Ohtani with the Angels. He was known for his soft-contact bloop hits and frequent contact, resulting in a low amount of walks and strikeouts. His 26-game hitting streak in 2021 was the longest in MLB that year and the second-longest in Angels history, behind Garret Anderson's 28.

== Early life ==
David Owen Fletcher was born on May 31, 1994, in Orange, California. He is the son of Tim Fletcher, a former college football player for Saddleback College, construction worker, and Army veteran, and Fernanda Fletcher, a professional dancer. Fletcher showed interest in baseball from a young age, playing soft toss at age four with Angels infielder Gary DiSarcina at a fan appreciation event. At age 13, Fletcher first trained with Stan Grebeck, a baseball coach and brother of former major leaguer Craig Grebeck. Grebeck took note of Fletcher's quick release on defense and predicted that he would eventually play in the major leagues. Fletcher continued to work with Grebeck, evolving his swing and training to hit high fastballs.

Fletcher attended Cypress High School in Cypress, California. He finished his sophomore season batting .317 with 15 runs batted in (RBIs). In his junior season, Fletcher was named by The Orange County Register as a top high school athlete in the county to watch in 2012, alongside Tyler Mahle. Through early April, he was batting .429 as Cypress's leadoff hitter with 10 stolen bases in 13 attempts. Fletcher finished his junior season batting .422 with a team-best 46 hits and only one strikeout in 119 plate appearances. Fletcher was selected to the Register's all-county second team, sharing honors with James Kaprielian, Jacob Nix, Tyler Mahle, and Ryan McMahon. In 2013, his senior year, Fletcher batted .437, aiding Cypress in winning the CIF Southern Section (CIF-SS) Division 2 championship. Following the season, he was named to the Register's all-county first team, the Los Angeles Times High School All-Star baseball team, and was named the CIF-SS Division 2 MVP.

== College career ==
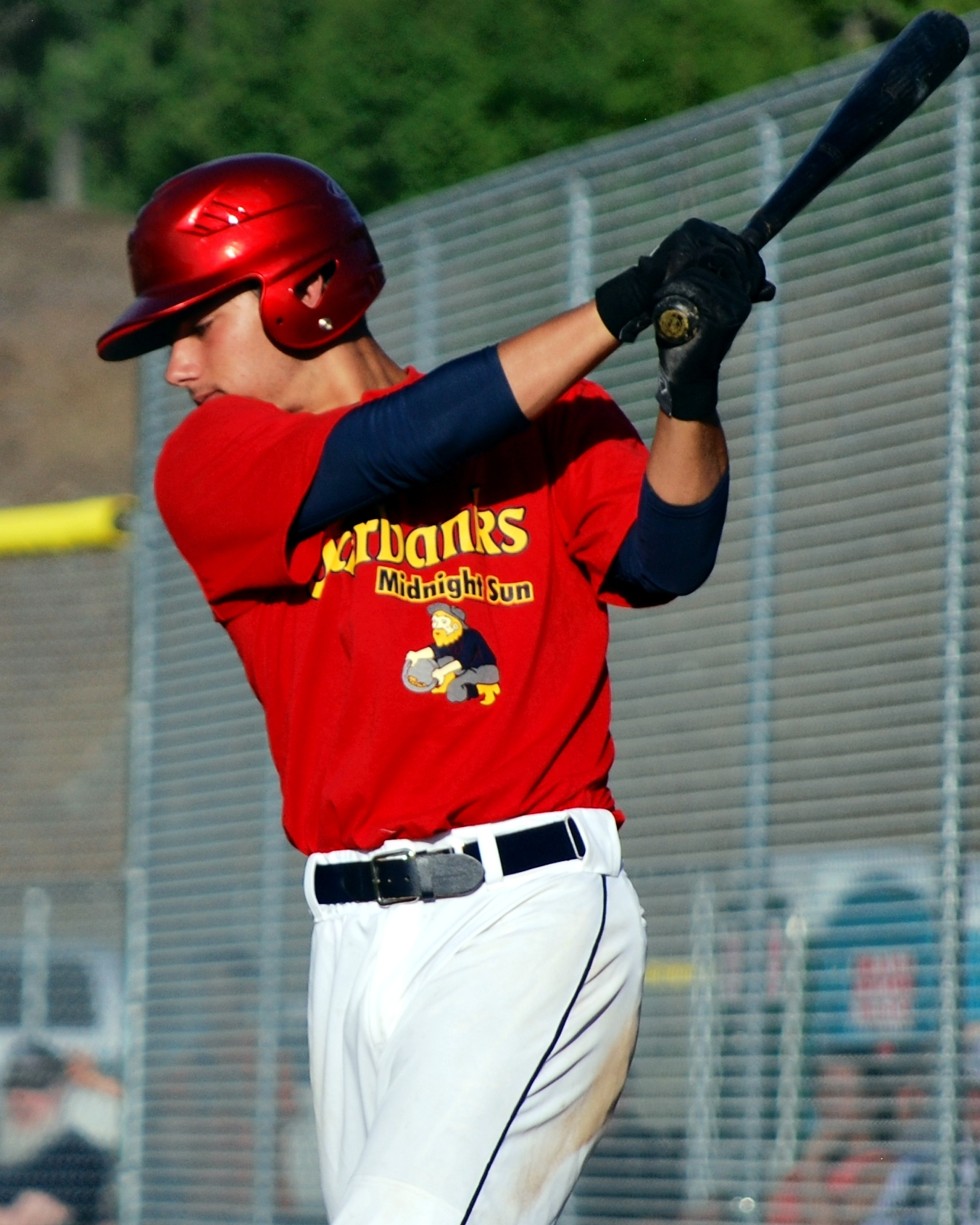
Fletcher with the Alaska Goldpanners in 2013

After graduating from high school in 2013, Fletcher enrolled at Loyola Marymount University (LMU) and became a member of the LMU Lions baseball team of the West Coast Conference (WCC), beginning in the 2014 season. Fletcher chose to attend LMU over UC Irvine and UCLA. Prior to his first season with the Lions, he made his collegiate summer baseball debut with the Alaska Goldpanners of the Alaska Baseball League. In 35 games with the Goldpanners, Fletcher batted .246 with 15 RBIs and 20 stolen bases in 25 attempts.

In 2014, Fletcher's freshman year, he batted .329 with 28 RBIs and 17 stolen bases (21 attempts) in 56 games. After the season, he was honored by Baseball America and the National Collegiate Baseball Writers Association (NCBWA) with freshman All-American team selections. Fletcher was also named to the All-WCC first team and was named the WCC Defensive Player of the Year. In the summer of 2014, Fletcher played with the Orleans Firebirds of the Cape Cod Baseball League (CCBL), joining Bobby Dalbec, Jake Cronenworth, and Taylor Ward on the roster. In 41 games with Orleans, Fletcher batted .299 with 17 RBIs and seven stolen bases (eight attempts). He was named a CCBL All-Star.

In 2015, as a sophomore, Fletcher batted .308 with two home runs, 27 RBIs, and 14 stolen bases (17 attempts) in 55 games. He was named to the All-WCC first team for the second consecutive season and was selected as LMU's Male Athlete of the Year. While at LMU, Fletcher was majoring in psychology.

== Professional career ==
=== Los Angeles Angels ===
==== Minor leagues ====
Fletcher was drafted by the Los Angeles Angels in the sixth round of the 2015 Major League Baseball draft, the 195th overall pick. Fletcher was one of six players from LMU taken in the 2015 draft and the earliest selection among the group. Fletcher had two years of collegiate eligibility remaining but ultimately signed with the Angels for a $406,900 bonus, a $178,800 over-slot signing.

On June 16, 2015, Fletcher was assigned to the Rookie Advanced-level Orem Owlz of the Pioneer League. He made his professional baseball debut on June 18, starting at shortstop and going 1-for-3 with an RBI and a walk against the Ogden Raptors. In his first 10 games, Fletcher went 16-for-46 (.348) with 11 RBIs and four stolen bases. In 34 games with Orem, Fletcher batted .336 with 27 RBIs and 11 stolen bases (14 attempts). On July 28, he was promoted to the Single-A Burlington Bees of the Midwest League. On August 26, Fletcher hit his first professional home run, a solo shot off Wisconsin Timber Rattlers starter David Burkhalter. In 32 games with Burlington, Fletcher batted .283 with a home run, 10 RBIs, and six stolen bases (seven attempts). Fletcher was sent back to Orem on September 5, spending his final three games of the season with the Owlz.

In 2016, Fletcher partook in his first spring training as a non-roster invitee and went 5-for-8 (.625) in 8 games. He began the minor league season with the Class A-Advanced Inland Empire 66ers of the California League. In his first 20 games with Inland Empire, he batted .169 with four RBIs and eight stolen bases on eight attempts. On May 2, Fletcher was sidelined with tendinitis in his left hand and was placed on the temporary inactive list. Although manager Chad Tracy stated his hope that Fletcher would return after a few days, he would not be activated until June 11. After his return, Fletcher spent most of the season with Inland Empire, batting .275 with three home runs, 31 RBI, and 15 stolen bases (16 attempts) in a total of 78 games. On August 16, he was promoted to the Double-A Arkansas Travelers of the Texas League. In 20 games with Arkansas, Fletcher batted .300 with six RBIs and a stolen base. Following the season, he played for the Scottsdale Scorpions of the Arizona Fall League, going 11-for-41 (.268) with four RBIs and a pair of stolen bases in 10 games.

Fletcher was again a non-roster invitee to spring training in 2017 and later began the season with the Mobile BayBears of the Southern League, the new Angels Double-A affiliate. On April 11, he was placed on the 7-day disabled list and was reactivated on May 8. In 64 games with Mobile, Fletcher batted .276 with a home run, 22 RBIs, and 12 stolen bases (17 attempts). On July 15, he was promoted to the Triple-A Salt Lake Bees of the Pacific Coast League. In 47 games with Salt Lake, Fletcher batted .254 with two home runs, 17 RBIs, and eight stolen bases (nine attempts).

In 2018, Fletcher was a non-roster invitee to spring training camp for the third consecutive season. He began the season with the Salt Lake Bees. In 58 games with Salt Lake, Fletcher batted .350 with six home runs, 37 RBIs, and seven stolen bases (eight attempts).

==== 2018–2020: Utility role ====
The Angels promoted Fletcher to the major leagues on June 12, 2018. He made his MLB debut on June 13, hitting a two-run triple off Seattle Mariners starter Marco Gonzales for his first major league hit and his first two RBI. He later singled off relievers Mike Morin and Roenis Elías, finishing his debut game 3-for-4 with two RBIs and five total bases. On July 12, Fletcher went 2-for-5 and hit his first major league home run, a leadoff home run against Mariners starter James Paxton on the second pitch he saw. In his first major league season, Fletcher played at second base, shortstop, third base, and right field. He batted .275 with a home run and 25 RBI in 80 games.

In 2019, Fletcher made the Angels' Opening Day roster as an infielder. Early in April, he began to see playing time in left field due to an injury to Kole Calhoun and the subsequent move of Brian Goodwin to right field. By May, Fletcher continued to play in left field due to Justin Upton's extended turf toe injury absence. Angels manager Brad Ausmus stated his confidence in Fletcher's outfield abilities, saying he no longer viewed him as an "infielder playing the outfield". From May 21 to June 3, Fletcher composed a 13-game hitting streak, a span in which he went 22-for-53 (.415) with a home run and six RBI. Fletcher finished the season batting .290 with six home runs, 49 RBIs, eight stolen bases (11 attempts), and a team-leading 173 hits in 154 games. He was driven in by Mike Trout 15 times, Shohei Ohtani 12 times, and Albert Pujols 12 times. Out of all major leaguers, he swung at the lowest percentage of pitches inside the strike zone (48.7%) and made contact with the highest percentage of pitches he swung at (91.1%), the highest percentage of pitches he swung at in the strike zone (96.1%), as well as the highest percentage of pitches he swung at outside the strike zone (82.6%).

In 2020, Fletcher began the season filling in for an injured Anthony Rendon at third base. Upon Rendon's return, Fletcher moved to shortstop to fill in for Andrelton Simmons, who was also recovering from an injury. Angels manager Joe Maddon stated that Fletcher would remain an everyday player once Simmons returned, either as a platoon at second base with Tommy La Stella or as a corner outfielder. When La Stella was traded on August 28, Fletcher became the team's primary second baseman. Fletcher finished the COVID-19-shortened season batting a team-leading .319 with three home runs and 18 RBI in 49 games. He led the Angels in hits for the second consecutive season with 66. He received a single voting point for the American League MVP award, placing him in a tie for 17th in the final voting results.

==== 2021–2023: Time in the middle infield ====
"I think there's Joe Namath and there's David Fletcher. Two tremendous lore-like heroes. He has that thing. There's nothing on that baseball field that he doesn't think he can do. The lore of David Fletcher is beginning and I can only compare to Joe Cool."

— Joe Maddon on Fletcher in 2021

On April 1, 2021, just hours before the Angels' Opening Day game against the Chicago White Sox, it was announced that Fletcher signed a five-year, $26 million extension with the team. The deal included two club options that could extend the contract to seven years and $41 million in value. Upon signing the extension, Fletcher stated that he would like to play his entire career with the Angels. From June 13 to July 17, Fletcher compiled a 26-game hitting streak, including four-hit performances on June 14, July 6, and July 11. The streak ended on July 18 when he went 0-for-5 in a 7–4 loss to the Seattle Mariners. The streak was the longest in the majors for the 2021 season and was the second-longest in Angels history, surpassing Rod Carew's 25-game streak from 1982 but falling short of Garret Anderson's 28-game streak from 1998. Fletcher struggled near the end of the season, batting .161 with a .400 on-base plus slugging (OPS) in the final 51 games of the year. He finished the season batting .262 with two home runs, 47 RBI, and 15 stolen bases (18 attempts) in 157 games. He had the highest percentage of softly hit balls of all major leaguers at 23.2%, the lowest percentage of hard-hit balls at 17.3%, and had the most infield hits in the major leagues with 28. He also took fewer pitches per plate appearance than any other MLB batter at 3.33.

In the first week of the 2022 season, Fletcher went 1-for-13 (.077) with an RBI. On April 12, he was placed on the 10-day injured list due to a left hip strain that originated during spring training and failed to fully heal before the start of the regular season. Fletcher met with a specialist in Philadelphia and received cortisone injections in an attempt to heal the injury without surgery. He returned on April 29 but continued to struggle at the plate, posting a season .158 batting average through May 7. On May 8, Fletcher was placed on the 15-day injured list as his hip injury had failed to heal. Fletcher returned to Philadelphia for evaluation and it was determined he would need surgery. He underwent the surgery on May 10 with a recovery timetable of approximately two months and an expectation that he would return before the end of the season. Fletcher returned to the Angels lineup on July 28, going 1-for-3 with a double in his first game back. In his first 15 games since returning from the surgery, he went 19-for-53 (.359) with two home runs and 10 RBI. On September 10, Fletcher exited a game against the Houston Astros after receiving a contusion on his right hand. X-rays showed no bone breakage and he was considered day-to-day. On September 17, Fletcher was placed on the 10-day injured list. He returned to the Angels lineup on September 29, going 1-for-4 against the Oakland Athletics. Fletcher finished the season batting .255 with two home runs and 17 RBI in 61 games.

Fletcher began the 2023 season with the Angels but went 2-for-16 (.125) in limited playing time. He was optioned to the Triple-A Salt Lake Bees on April 15, 2023, following the promotion of Zach Neto. On April 17, Fletcher was removed from the 40-man roster and sent outright to Salt Lake. After 43 games for Salt Lake, his contract was selected back to the major league roster on June 24. In 11 more games, Fletcher hit .258 with one home run and seven RBI. On July 14, he was again removed from the 40-man roster and outrighted to Triple–A Salt Lake. On September 14, Fletcher was again selected to the major league roster.

=== Atlanta Braves ===
On December 8, 2023, the Angels traded Fletcher and catcher Max Stassi to the Atlanta Braves in exchange for minor leaguers Evan White and Tyler Thomas. The Braves outrighted him to the Triple–A Gwinnett Stripers on December 13. Fletcher was added to the major league roster on April 16, 2024, following an injury to Ozzie Albies. In five games for the club, he went 2–for–8 (.250) with no home runs and two RBI. On April 25, Fletcher was removed from the 40–man roster and sent outright to Triple–A Gwinnett.

While playing for Gwinnett, Fletcher began pitching for the first time at a professional level, primarily throwing a knuckleball. After coming into his first four games as a relief pitcher, Fletcher logged his first career start on May 29, 2024. In five innings of work, he gave up 2 runs on 3 hits and logged 6 strikeouts. On June 2, Fletcher was assigned to the Double–A Mississippi Braves. On November 6, the Braves declined their club option on Fletcher, making him a free agent.

On November 11, 2025, Fletcher announced his retirement from professional baseball.

== International career ==
On August 31, 2022, Italy national baseball team manager Mike Piazza announced that Fletcher would join the roster for the 2023 World Baseball Classic. He joined Trey Mancini and Jordan Romano in a group of major leaguers committing to represent Italy for the competition. He was later joined by his brother, Dominic, marking the first time the two played on the same team since high school. Although an American citizen, Fletcher was eligible to play for the team because his mother was born in Italy. In 5 games, Fletcher went 4-for-20 (.200) as Italy was eliminated in the quarterfinals by the Japan national baseball team.

== Player profile ==
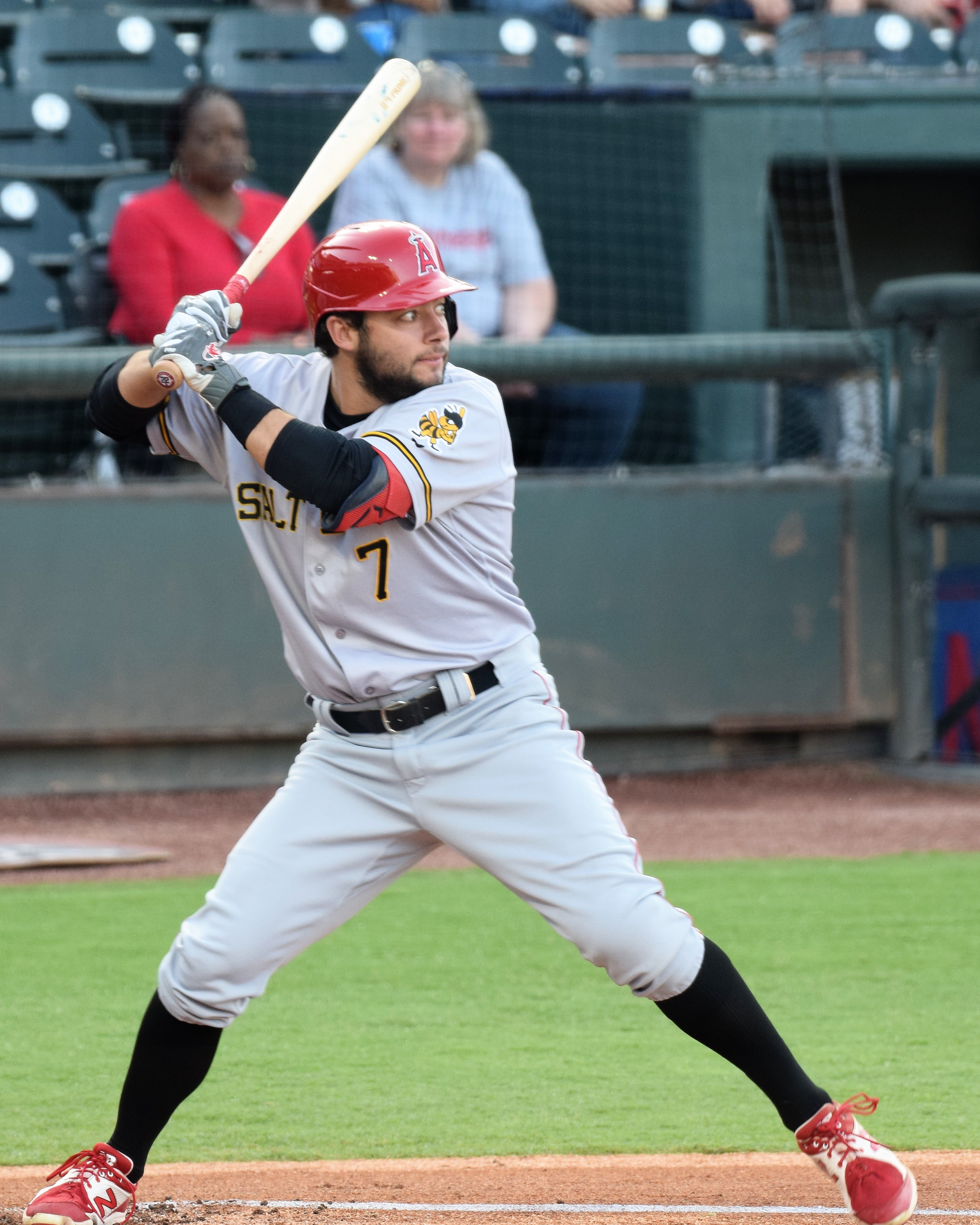
Fletcher during an injury rehab assignment with the Salt Lake Bees

At 5 ft 9 and 185 lbs (1.75 m, 85 kg), Fletcher was below average height for an MLB player. He was regarded as a contact hitter that accrued many of his hits from low-exit velocity bloop hits. Similar to Angels Hall of Famer Vladimir Guerrero, Fletcher was known for making contact with pitches outside of the strike zone, including an instance in 2020 where he hit a pitch above his head for a double. Fletcher posted the third-lowest average exit velocity in MLB in both 2019 and 2021 at 83.8 and 82.3 miles per hour (134.9 and 132.4 kilometers per hour) respectively.

Fletcher began his major league career as a utility player, having played at every defensive position except catcher, first base, and center fielder through his first three seasons with the Angels. When two of the Angels' catchers were placed on the injured list in 2019, Fletcher was named as the team's emergency catcher and worked with catching coach José Molina in preparation for the temporary role. With the trade of Tommy La Stella in the 2020 season, Fletcher was moved from the utility role and became the team's starting second baseman in 2021 and the starting shortstop in 2022.

Fletcher is widely praised for his defensive skills in the middle infield. Between his debut in June 2018 and April 2022, Fletcher posted a total of 41 Defensive Runs Saved, the 15th-most in MLB and the most on the Angels.

Fletcher was often considered an underrated player on a national scale, with Sports Illustrated once labeling him "baseball's most anonymous talent". Due to his short stature, contact-hitting approach, and defensive abilities, Fletcher has been compared to former Angels middle infielder David Eckstein, a player that he idolized while growing up not far from Angel Stadium.

During his career, Fletcher received endorsement deals from Budweiser, Bank of America, and New Balance.

== Personal life ==
Fletcher's younger brother, Dominic, is an outfielder in the major leagues. The two were teammates at Cypress High School in 2013 when David was a senior and Dominic was a freshman. The two played together for the first time professionally for the Italy national baseball team during the 2023 World Baseball Classic.

Fletcher and his wife, Kierra, married in December 2018 and reside in Orange County, California.

On May 17, 2024, ESPN sources reported that Fletcher had bet on non-baseball sports games, using the same bookmaker that former Shohei Ohtani interpreter Ippei Mizuhara used.
