= Jesse Chavez =

American baseball player (born 1983)

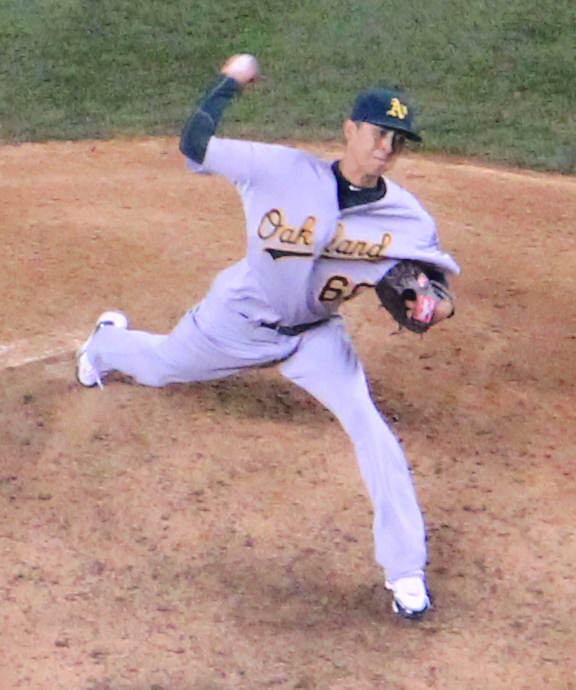
- Chavez with the Oakland Athletics in 2013

San Francisco Giants – No. 75
- Pitcher / Coach
- Born: August 21, 1983 (age 43); San Gabriel, California, U.S.
- Batted: Right Threw: Right

MLB debut
- August 27, 2008, for the Pittsburgh Pirates

Last MLB appearance
- July 13, 2025, for the Atlanta Braves

MLB statistics
- Win–loss record: 51–66
- Earned run average: 4.27
- Strikeouts: 1,044
- Stats at Baseball Reference

Teams
- As player: Pittsburgh Pirates (2008–2009); Atlanta Braves (2010); Kansas City Royals (2010–2011); Toronto Blue Jays (2012); Oakland Athletics (2012–2015); Toronto Blue Jays (2016); Los Angeles Dodgers (2016); Los Angeles Angels (2017); Texas Rangers (2018); Chicago Cubs (2018); Texas Rangers (2019–2020); Atlanta Braves (2021); Chicago Cubs (2022); Atlanta Braves (2022); Los Angeles Angels (2022); Atlanta Braves (2022–2025); As coach: San Francisco Giants (2026–present)

Career highlights and awards
- World Series champion (2021)

Jesse David Chavez (born August 21, 1983) is an American former professional baseball pitcher who currently serves as the bullpen coach for the San Francisco Giants of Major League Baseball (MLB). He played college baseball at Riverside Community College, and was drafted by the Texas Rangers in the 42nd round of the 2002 MLB draft. He played in MLB for the Pittsburgh Pirates, Atlanta Braves, Kansas City Royals, Toronto Blue Jays, Oakland Athletics, Los Angeles Dodgers, Los Angeles Angels, Texas Rangers, and Chicago Cubs. He won a World Series in 2021 with the Braves.

Chavez is the most traded player in MLB history, having been traded eleven times over the course of his career.

== Amateur career ==
Chavez was born in San Gabriel, California. A graduate of Fontana A.B. Miller High School in Fontana, California, Chavez later attended Riverside Community College, where he spent two seasons. During his freshman season at Riverside, Chavez went 13–2 with a 1.96 ERA and 11–5 with a 1.93 ERA for his sophomore season.

== Professional career ==
Chavez was originally drafted in the 39th round out of high school by the Chicago Cubs, but opted to attend college instead.

=== Texas Rangers ===
Chavez was later drafted by the Texas Rangers in the 2002 Major League Baseball draft out of Riverside Community College. In 2006, Chavez was promoted to the Triple-A Oklahoma RedHawks, where he pitched one game before being traded.

=== Pittsburgh Pirates ===
The Rangers traded Chavez to the Pittsburgh Pirates in exchange for Kip Wells on July 31, 2006. He was assigned to the Triple-A Indianapolis Indians where he pitched the rest of the season and all of 2007.

Chavez appeared in 51 games for the Indians in 2007, pitching to a 3.80 earned run average (ERA), and was promoted to the major leagues on August 27, 2007, making his debut the same day. He made 15 appearances for Pittsburgh during his rookie campaign, but struggled to an 0-1 record and 6.60 ERA with 16 strikeouts over 15 innings of work.

Chavez made 73 appearances out of the bullpen for the Pirates during the 2009 season, registering a 1-4 record and 4.01 ERA with 47 strikeouts across 67 1/3 innings pitched.

=== Atlanta Braves ===
The Pirates traded Chavez on November 3, 2009, to the Tampa Bay Rays in exchange for second baseman Akinori Iwamura. On December 10, Chavez was traded to the Atlanta Braves in exchange for Rafael Soriano. Chavez made 28 appearances for Atlanta during the 2010 season, posting a 3-2 record and 5.89 ERA with 29 strikeouts across 38 2/3 innings pitched.

=== Kansas City Royals ===
On July 31, 2010, Chavez was traded to the Kansas City Royals along with Gregor Blanco and Tim Collins in exchange for Rick Ankiel and Kyle Farnsworth. He made 23 relief outings for the team down the stretch, logging a 2-3 record and 5.88 ERA with 16 strikeouts over 26 innings of work.

Chavez made four appearances for the Royals in 2011, but struggled to a 10.57 ERA with eight strikeouts across 7 2/3 innings pitched. Chavez was designated for assignment by Kansas City on October 11, 2011, following the acquisition of Aaron Laffey.

=== Toronto Blue Jays ===
On October 21, 2011, Chavez was claimed off waivers by the Toronto Blue Jays. He was designated for assignment on December 12 but cleared waivers and was outrighted to Triple-A.

On May 27, 2012, Chavez was called up from the Triple-A Las Vegas 51s. He was 6–2 with a 3.72 ERA in 10 games with Las Vegas. He was recalled on August 4. On August 5, however, he was sent back down to make room for the promotion of Chad Jenkins from the New Hampshire Fisher Cats.

=== Oakland Athletics ===
Chavez was traded to the Oakland Athletics on August 24, 2012, in exchange for cash considerations.

Chavez began the 2013 season with the Triple-A Sacramento River Cats. He was recalled by Oakland on April 20, and sent back to Sacramento on April 29. He was recalled again on May 10. On June 13, Chavez pitched 5 2/3 shutout innings of relief in an 18-inning game against the New York Yankees, earning the win. On July 31, Chavez pitched against the Blue Jays for the first time since being traded to Oakland and took the loss, yielding 3 runs in the 10th inning.

Chavez was added to Oakland's starting rotation to open the 2014 season, due to the spring injuries of Jarrod Parker and A.J. Griffin. He set career highs in starts and innings pitched, and finished with an 8–8 record with a 3.45 ERA.

On January 12, 2015, Chavez and the Athletics agreed to a one-year deal worth $2.15 million, avoiding arbitration. Chavez was placed in the bullpen to start the season. On April 23, he was moved to the rotation and ended up making 26 starts for Oakland, a career high, pitching to a 7–15 record and a 4.18 ERA. His season ended in mid-September when he was diagnosed with a non-displaced fracture in his ribs.

=== Toronto Blue Jays (second stint) ===
On November 20, 2015, the Athletics traded Chavez to the Toronto Blue Jays for Liam Hendriks. He and the Blue Jays did not come to an agreement before the salary arbitration deadline on January 15, 2016. Chavez was seeking $4 million, while the Blue Jays countered at $3.6 million. On February 6, it was announced Chavez had won his arbitration case. Chavez entered spring training in competition for the fifth starter role with Aaron Sanchez, Drew Hutchison, and Gavin Floyd. On March 28, it was announced Sanchez would be the team's fifth starter, and Chavez would begin the season in the bullpen. On May 17, 2016, Chavez was suspended for 3 games after he intentionally hit Texas Rangers batter Prince Fielder on May 15 after the Blue Jays and Rangers had a bench clearing brawl in the top of the 8th that resulted in Rougned Odor punching José Bautista after Bautista slid hard into Odor to break up a double play. Chavez pitched to a 1–2 record, 4.57 ERA, and 42 strikeouts in 41 1/3 innings before being traded.

=== Los Angeles Dodgers ===
On August 1, 2016, the Blue Jays traded Chavez to the Los Angeles Dodgers for Mike Bolsinger. He appeared in 23 games for the Dodgers, posting a 4.21 ERA with 21 strikeouts across 25 2/3 innings of work.

=== Los Angeles Angels ===
On November 11, 2016, Chavez signed a one-year, $5.75 million contract with the Los Angeles Angels. Chavez was chosen to start in the Angels rotation at the beginning of the season due to the bevy of injuries. Chavez made 21 starts, going 5–9 with a 5.24 ERA before being put in the bullpen after the All-Star Break. Chavez finished the season 7–11 in 38 games, 21 starts.

=== Texas Rangers ===
On February 23, 2018, Chavez signed a one-year, $1 million contract with the Texas Rangers. In 30 relief outings for Texas, Chavez pitched to a 3-1 record and 3.51 ERA with 50 strikeouts and one save across 56 1/3 innings pitched.

=== Chicago Cubs ===
On July 19, 2018, Chavez was acquired by the Chicago Cubs for minor league pitcher Tyler Thomas. Chavez posted an impressive 1.15 ERA with 42 strikeouts in 32 appearances with the Cubs.

=== Texas Rangers (second stint) ===
On November 30, 2018, Chavez signed a two-year contract to return to the Texas Rangers. Chavez was placed on the injured list on August 13, 2019, with elbow inflammation, which stemmed from a bone spur. He finished the 2019 season going 3–5 with a 4.85 ERA in 78 innings. Chavez underwent surgery to remove loose bodies from his elbow on September 9.

In 2020 with Texas, Chavez made 18 appearances, compiling a 6.88 ERA with 13 strikeouts in 17 innings.

=== Atlanta Braves (second stint) ===
On February 26, 2021, Chavez signed a minor league contract with the Los Angeles Angels organization that included an invitation to spring training. He was released by the Angels prior to the start of the season on March 26.

On April 17, 2021, Chavez signed a minor league contract with the Atlanta Braves organization. On June 24, Chavez was selected to the active roster. In 2021, he was 3–2 with a 2.14 ERA and 36 strikeouts in 30 games (4 starts) in which he pitched 33 2/3 innings. In the 2021 postseason, Chavez made 7 appearances for the Braves, including starting Game 4 of the NLCS, and did not surrender any runs.

=== Chicago Cubs (second stint) ===
On March 13, 2022, Chavez signed a minor league split contract with the Chicago Cubs. On April 2, the Cubs selected the Chavez's contract, adding him to their active roster. In 3 games for the Cubs, he recorded a 6.35 ERA with 3 strikeouts in 5 2/3 innings of work.

=== Atlanta Braves (third stint) ===
On April 20, 2022, Chavez, along with cash considerations, was traded to the Atlanta Braves for Sean Newcomb. In 46 appearances for the Braves, he accumulated a 3-3 record and 2.72 ERA with 61 strikeouts across 53 innings pitched.

=== Los Angeles Angels (second stint) ===
On August 2, 2022, Chavez and Tucker Davidson were traded from the Braves to the Los Angeles Angels for Raisel Iglesias. During the 2022 season, Chavez set the record for most trades in a Major League Baseball career, with ten. In 11 games, Chavez struggled to a 7.59 ERA with 10 strikeouts across 10 2/3 innings of work. On August 29, Chavez was released by the Angels.

=== Atlanta Braves (fourth stint) ===
On August 30, 2022, Chavez was claimed off waivers by the Atlanta Braves. On November 12, Chavez re-signed with the Braves on a one-year minor league contract. He was invited to major league spring training before the 2023 regular season began. Chavez made the Braves' Opening Day roster and formally had his contract selected on March 30, 2023. He posted a strong 1.55 ERA in 31 games before he was hit in the left leg by a comebacker off the bat of Miguel Cabrera in a June 14 game against the Detroit Tigers. He was placed on the injured list the following day with a shin contusion. On July 23, Chavez was transferred to the 60-day injured list after manager Brian Snitker said he was still "weeks away" from returning. On September 19, Chavez was activated from the injured list.

On February 8, 2024, Chavez signed a minor league contract with the Chicago White Sox and received an invitation to major league spring training. Chavez was released by the White Sox organization on March 23 after posting an 11.57 ERA in seven innings during spring training.

Chavez considered retiring after being released by the White Sox but instead re-signed with the Braves organization on another minor league contract two days after the White Sox released him. On March 28, Chavez was selected to the Opening Day roster. In 46 appearances out of the bullpen for Atlanta, he logged a 2-2 record and 3.13 ERA with 55 strikeouts across 63 1/3 innings pitched.

On January 27, 2025, Chavez signed a minor league contract with the Texas Rangers. Rangers general manager Chris Young noted Chavez's skill set and longevity, saying “His record speaks for itself. He attacks the strike zone. He’s not afraid, he knows his stuff and how it plays. He’s very smart, is able to read swings.” He was released prior to the start of the season on March 21.

On March 23, 2025, Chavez signed a minor league contract to return the Braves organization. On March 31, the Braves selected Chavez's contract, adding him to their active roster. He tossed two innings against the Los Angeles Dodgers, allowing one run on two hits with one strikeout. The next day, Chavez was designated for assignment. Chavez cleared waivers and was sent outright to Gwinnett on April 3. He subsequently rejected the assignment in lieu of free agency. The next day, Chavez re-signed with Atlanta on a minor league contract. On April 23, the Braves selected Chavez's contract, adding him back to their active roster. After tossing an inning against the Arizona Diamondbacks in his only appearance, Chavez was designated for assignment again on April 27. He elected free agency after clearing waivers on April 29. On May 1, Atlanta re-signed Chavez to a minor league contract. On July 6, the Braves added Chavez back to their active roster. On July 17, Chavez was designated for assignment by the Braves for a third time on the year. He elected free agency after clearing waivers on July 21. On July 24, Chavez announced his retirement from baseball on the podcast Foul Territory.

== Coaching career ==
On December 5, 2025, the San Francisco Giants hired Chavez as the team's bullpen coach under new manager Tony Vitello.

== Personal life ==
Chavez is married to Crystal. The couple has three daughters: Criste, Stevee, and Dannie.
