= Pierce Johnson =

American baseball player (born 1991)

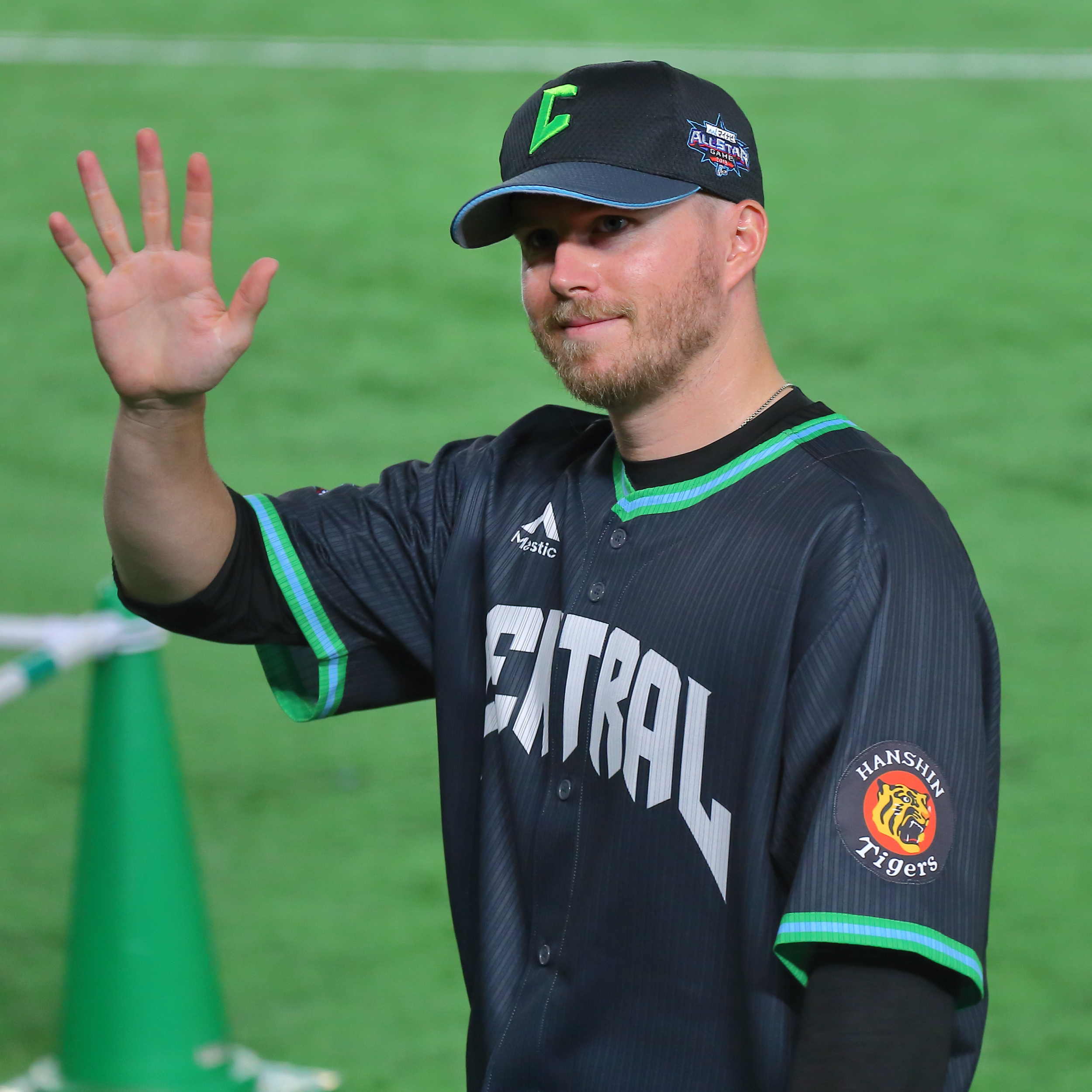
- Johnson with the Hanshin Tigers in 2019

Free agent
- Pitcher
- Born: May 10, 1991 (age 35); Denver, Colorado, U.S.
- Bats: Right Throws: Right

Professional debut
- MLB: May 19, 2017, for the Chicago Cubs
- NPB: March 29, 2019, for the Hanshin Tigers

MLB statistics (through 2026 season)
- Win–loss record: 23–25
- Earned run average: 3.90
- Strikeouts: 421

NPB statistics (through 2019 season)
- Win–loss record: 2–3
- Earned run average: 1.38
- Strikeouts: 91
- Stats at Baseball Reference

Teams
- Chicago Cubs (2017); San Francisco Giants (2018); Hanshin Tigers (2019); San Diego Padres (2020–2022); Colorado Rockies (2023); Atlanta Braves (2023–2025); Cincinnati Reds (2026)

Career highlights and awards
- NPB: NPB All-Star (2019)

Pierce William Johnson (born May 10, 1991) is an American professional baseball pitcher who is a free agent. He has played in Major League Baseball (MLB) for the Chicago Cubs, San Francisco Giants, San Diego Padres, Colorado Rockies, Atlanta Braves, and Cincinnati Reds, and in Nippon Professional Baseball (NPB) for the Hanshin Tigers. He was drafted by the Cubs in the first round of the 2012 MLB draft out of Missouri State University.

== Amateur career ==
Johnson attended Faith Christian Academy in Arvada, Colorado, where he played baseball for three seasons on the varsity team. The Tampa Bay Rays selected him in the 15th round of the 2009 Major League Baseball draft. He did not sign and attended Missouri State University, where he played college baseball for the Missouri State Bears. He finished his first year at Missouri State with a 6–5 win–loss record and a 4.76 earned run average (ERA) in 75 2/3 innings pitched. In 2010 and 2011, he played collegiate summer baseball with the Harwich Mariners of the Cape Cod Baseball League.

== Professional career ==
=== Chicago Cubs ===
The Chicago Cubs selected Johnson in the first round of the 2012 Major League Baseball draft. In 2013, he went 11–6 with a 2.74 ERA and 124 strikeouts in 118 innings pitched in a season split between the Kane County Cougars and the Daytona Cubs. Prior to the 2014 season, he was ranked by Baseball America as the 87th best prospect in baseball. The Cubs added him to their 40-man roster after the 2015 season.

Johnson spent 2014 with both the Kane County Cougars and the Tennessee Smokies where he posted a 5–5 record with a 2.54 ERA. Johnson stayed with the Smokies during the 2015 season, where he posted a 6–2 record with a 2.08 ERA, holding batters to a .223 batting average. After his success in Tennessee, Johnson was promoted to the Triple-A Iowa Cubs, where he posted a 4–6 record with a 6.14 ERA.

=== San Francisco Giants ===
On September 20, 2017, Johnson was claimed off waivers by the San Francisco Giants.

In 2018, Johnson made 37 appearances out of the bullpen for the Giants, recording a 5.56 ERA with 36 strikeouts across 43 2/3 innings pitched. On November 2, he was removed from the 40–man roster and sent outright to the Triple–A Sacramento River Cats. However, Johnson rejected the assignment and subsequently elected free agency.

=== Hanshin Tigers ===
On December 8, 2018, Johnson signed with the Hanshin Tigers of Nippon Professional Baseball (NPB). On December 2, 2019, he became a free agent.

=== San Diego Padres ===
On December 23, 2019, Johnson signed a two-year contract which includes a third-year club option with the San Diego Padres of Major League Baseball (MLB). In his first season with San Diego, Johnson recorded a 3-1 record and 2.70 ERA with 27 strikeouts in 20 innings. Johnson made 63 appearances for the Padres in 2021, logging a 3-4 record and 3.22 ERA with 77 strikeouts in 58 2/3 innings pitched.

On May 9, 2022, Johnson was placed on the 60-day injured list with right elbow tendinitis. He was activated from the injured list on September 10.

=== Colorado Rockies ===
On December 13, 2022, Johnson signed a one-year contract with the Colorado Rockies. Johnson began the 2023 season as Colorado's primary closer, but struggled to a 7.50 ERA across 26 games despite 13 saves. On June 9, 2023, the Rockies announced that Johnson would be removed from the closer role, with Justin Lawrence and Jake Bird named as candidates to fill the position.

=== Atlanta Braves ===
On July 23, 2023, Johnson was traded to the Atlanta Braves in exchange for minor league prospects Victor Vodnik and Tanner Gordon. In 24 appearances for Atlanta, he posted a stellar 0.76 ERA with 32 strikeouts in 23 2/3 innings of work. On October 25, Johnson signed a two–year, $14.25 million contract extension with the Braves.

Johnson made 58 relief outings for the Braves during the 2024 season, compiling a 6-6 record and 3.67 ERA with 67 strikeouts and two saves across 56 1/3 innings pitched. He made 65 appearances for Atlanta in the 2025 season, registering a 3-3 record and 3.05 ERA with 59 strikeouts and one save over 59 innings of work. Johnson became a free agent following the 2025 season, as the Braves declined a contract option of $7 million.

=== Cincinnati Reds ===
On January 15, 2026, Johnson signed a one-year, $6.5 million contract with the Cincinnati Reds. On October 31, the Reds declined their mutual option on Johnson making him a free agent.
