= 2024 Los Angeles Dodgers season =

Season for the Major League Baseball team the Los Angeles Dodgers

2024 Los Angeles Dodgers
- World Series champions National League champions National League West champions
- League: National League
- Division: West
- Ballpark: Dodger Stadium
- City: Los Angeles, California
- Record: 98–64 (.605)
- Divisional place: 1st
- Owners: Guggenheim Baseball Management
- President: Stan Kasten
- President of baseball operations: Andrew Friedman
- General manager: Brandon Gomes
- Manager: Dave Roberts
- Television: Spectrum SportsNet LA (Joe Davis, Stephen Nelson, Orel Hershiser, Eric Karros, Mookie Betts, Jessica Mendoza, Rick Monday and Kirsten Watson or David Vassegh)
- Radio: KLAC-AM; Los Angeles Dodgers Radio Network (Tim Neverett, Stephen Nelson, Rick Monday, José Mota); KTNQ (Pepe Yñiguez, Fernando Valenzuela, José Mota)
- Stats: ESPN.com; Baseball Reference

The 2024 Los Angeles Dodgers season was the 135th season for the Los Angeles Dodgers franchise in Major League Baseball (MLB), their 67th season in Los Angeles, California, and their 63rd season playing their home games at Dodger Stadium in Los Angeles California.

Shohei Ohtani made his Dodgers debut after signing a record 10-year, $700 million contract with the club in the off-season. In his first season, Ohtani became the first player in MLB history to break the 50 homerun, 50 stolen bases barrier in a single-season. In addition, he surpassed Shawn Green's Dodgers single-season home run record with 54 home runs. Ohtani's eventual Most Valuable Player (MVP) award win was the Dodgers first since Cody Bellinger in 2019. Ohtani would also join Frank Robinson as the only other player to win an AL and NL MVP.

The Dodgers broadcast teams suffered losses this season as both Charley Steiner and Fernando Valenzuela battled cancer. Steiner was unable to broadcast any games on the radio during 2024 but announced that his multiple myeloma blood cancer was in remission by the end of the season. Valenzuela, long time Dodgers player and a Spanish language broadcaster since 2003 worked most games but was forced to step down from broadcasting during the last week of the season due to a battle with liver cancer. Valenzuela would soon die of liver cancer a few days before the World Series began.

The Dodgers clinched their 12th consecutive postseason berth on September 19, which remains the longest active playoff streak in major North American professional sports. It also extended the longest playoff streak in franchise history. On September 26, the Dodgers won the National League West division for the third consecutive season and the 11th time in the past 12 seasons. The Dodgers remained in first place in the division for the entire season (making their postseason World Series victory a wire-to-wire win); The Dodgers finished the season with a 98–64 record, the best in the majors, and home field advantage throughout the playoffs. For the third time in five years, they faced their division rival San Diego Padres in the National League Division Series, which they won the series in five games to advance to the National League Championship Series. They beat the New York Mets in six games to win their first NL pennant since 2020 and 25th overall. They faced the New York Yankees in the World Series, the twelfth meeting between the two clubs in the World Series and the first since 1981. The Dodgers won the series in five games for their eighth World Series championship. The Series was highlighted by Freddie Freeman's walk-off grand slam in Game 1, which many compared to Kirk Gibson's Game 1 walk-off home run in the 1988 World Series.

== Offseason ==
=== Roster departures ===
On October 19, pitcher Wander Suero was outrighted to the minors and elected to become a free agent. On October 31, pitcher Tyler Cyr was also outrighted to the minors. On November 2, one day after the conclusion of the 2023 World Series, 12 Dodger players became free agents: Pitchers Clayton Kershaw, Jimmy Nelson, Ryan Brasier, Shelby Miller, and Julio Urías, outfielders Jason Heyward, Jake Marisnick and David Peralta, infielders Amed Rosario and Kolten Wong, designated hitter J. D. Martinez and utility player Kiké Hernández. The Dodgers declined the 2024 options on pitchers Lance Lynn, Alex Reyes, Joe Kelly and Daniel Hudson making them all free agents.

On December 11, the Dodgers traded pitcher Victor González and infielder Jorbit Vivas to the New York Yankees for minor league infielder Trey Sweeney. Pitcher Bryan Hudson was designated for assignment on December 27 and removed from the roster. On January 11, the Dodgers traded infielder Michael Busch and relief pitcher Yency Almonte to the Chicago Cubs in exchange for two minor league players, Jackson Ferris and Zyhir Hope. On February 5, the Dodgers traded pitcher Caleb Ferguson to the New York Yankees in exchange for pitcher Matt Gage and minor leaguer Christian Zazueta.

=== Roster additions ===
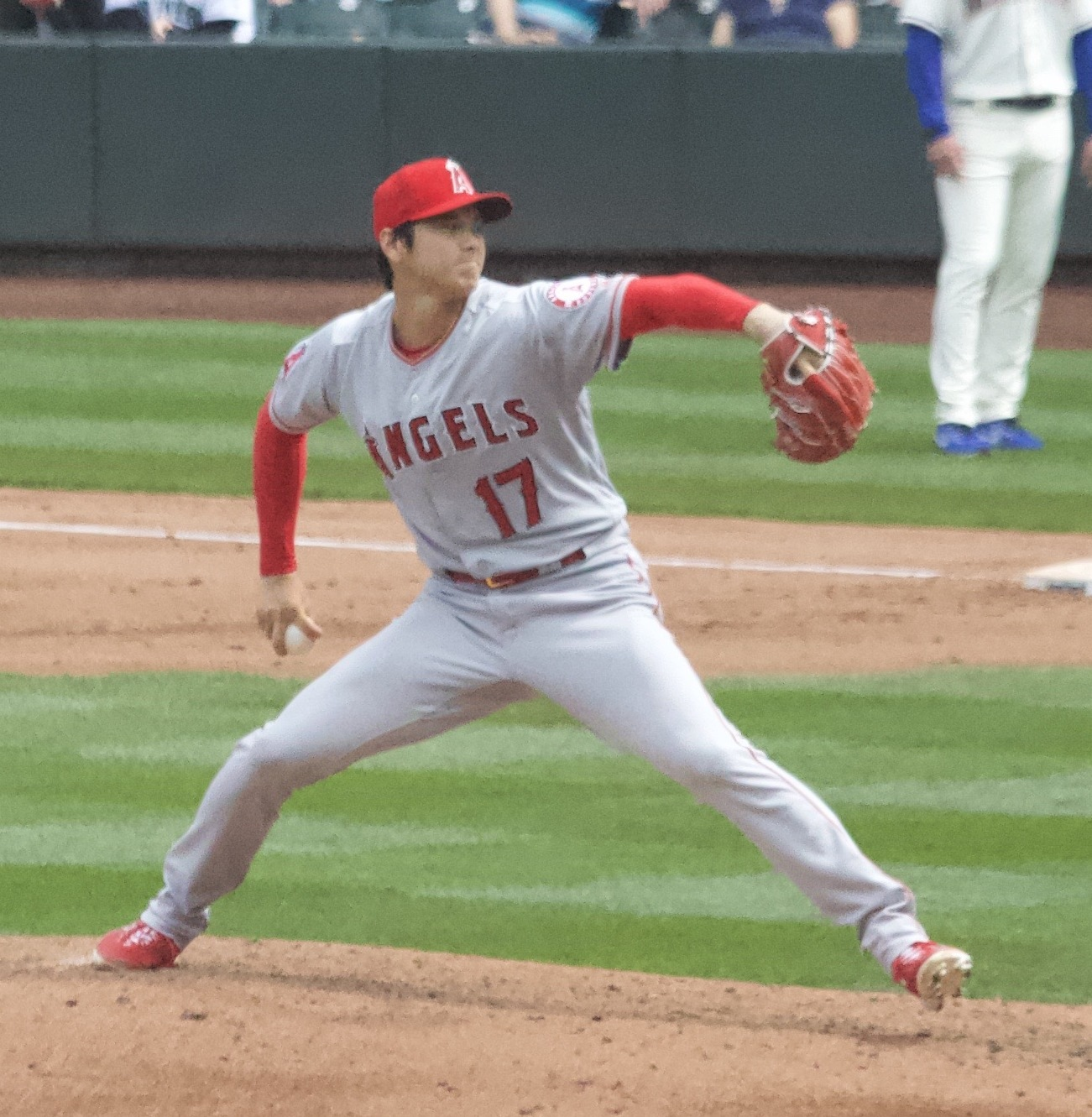
Shohei Ohtani was signed by the Dodgers in the offseason

On November 14, the Dodgers added minor league pitchers Nick Frasso and Landon Knack and catcher Hunter Feduccia to the 40-man roster to protect them from the Rule 5 draft. On November 16, they re-signed pitcher Ricky Vanasco, who had been with the team in the minors the previous season, to a one-year contract. On December 6, the Dodgers re-signed outfielder Jason Heyward to a one-year contract. On December 11, the Dodgers re-signed pitcher Joe Kelly to a one-year, $8 million, contract. Later that day, they signed pitcher/designated hitter Shohei Ohtani to a 10-year, $700 million contract. On December 16, the Dodgers traded pitcher Ryan Pepiot and outfielder Jonny DeLuca to the Tampa Bay Rays in exchange for pitcher Tyler Glasnow (who signed a five-year, $135 million extension) and outfielder Manuel Margot. On December 27, Pitcher Yoshinobu Yamamoto signed a twelve-year, $325 million contract with the team. The Dodgers also had to pay a $51 million posting fee to Yamamoto's Japanese team, the Orix Buffaloes. On January 12, the Dodgers signed outfielder Teoscar Hernández to a one-year, $23.5 million contract. On January 29, the Dodgers signed pitcher James Paxton to a one-year, $11 million contract. On February 8, the Dodgers re-signed relief pitcher Ryan Brasier to a two-year, $9 million contract. The following day, they re-signed Clayton Kershaw to a one-year contract that contained a player option for the 2025 season.

Off-season 40-man roster moves

Departing player	Date	Transaction	New team	Arriving player	Old team	Date	Transaction
Wander Suero	October 19	Outrighted	Houston Astros	Hunter Feduccia	Oklahoma City Dodgers	November 14	Added to 40-man roster
Tyler Cyr	October 31	Outrighted	N/A	Nick Frasso	Oklahoma City Dodgers	November 14	Added to 40-man roster
Ryan Brasier	November 2	Free agent	Los Angeles Dodgers	Landon Knack	Oklahoma City Dodgers	November 14	Added to 40-man roster
Kiké Hernández	November 2	Free agent	Los Angeles Dodgers	Ricky Vanasco	Oklahoma City Dodgers	November 16	Free agent signing
Jason Heyward	November 2	Free agent	Los Angeles Dodgers	Jason Heyward	Los Angeles Dodgers	December 6	Free agent signing
Clayton Kershaw	November 2	Free agent	Los Angeles Dodgers	Joe Kelly	Los Angeles Dodgers	December 11	Free agent signing
Jake Marisnick	November 2	Free agent	Los Angeles Angels	Shohei Ohtani	Los Angeles Angels	December 11	Free agent signing
J. D. Martinez	November 2	Free agent	New York Mets	Tyler Glasnow	Tampa Bay Rays	December 16	Trade
Shelby Miller	November 2	Free agent	Detroit Tigers	Manuel Margot	Tampa Bay Rays	December 16	Trade
Jimmy Nelson	November 2	Free agent	N/A	Yoshinobu Yamamoto	Orix Buffaloes	December 27	Free agent signing
David Peralta	November 2	Free agent	Chicago Cubs	Teoscar Hernández	Seattle Mariners	January 12	Free agent signing
Amed Rosario	November 2	Free agent	Tampa Bay Rays	James Paxton	Boston Red Sox	January 29	Free agent signing
Julio Urías	November 2	Free agent	N/A	Matt Gage	New York Yankees	February 5	Trade
Kolten Wong	November 2	Free agent	Baltimore Orioles	Ryan Brasier	Los Angeles Dodgers	February 8	Free agent signing
Lance Lynn	November 3	Option declined	St. Louis Cardinals	Clayton Kershaw	Los Angeles Dodgers	February 9	Free agent signing
Alex Reyes	November 4	Option declined	N/A				
Daniel Hudson	November 5	Option declined	Oklahoma City Baseball Club				
Joe Kelly	November 5	Option declined	Los Angeles Dodgers				
Victor González	December 11	Trade	New York Yankees				
Jorbit Vivas	December 11	Trade	New York Yankees				
Jonny DeLuca	December 16	Trade	Tampa Bay Rays				
Ryan Pepiot	December 16	Trade	Tampa Bay Rays				
Bryan Hudson	December 27	Designated for assignment	Milwaukee Brewers				
Yency Almonte	January 11	Trade	Chicago Cubs				
Michael Busch	January 11	Trade	Chicago Cubs				
Caleb Ferguson	February 5	Trade	New York Yankees				

== Spring training ==
Spring Training non-roster invitees

Player	Position	2023 team(s)
Nabil Crismatt	Pitcher	San Diego Padres / Arizona Diamondbacks
Stephen Gonsalves	Pitcher	Myrtle Beach Pelicans / South Bend Cubs / Iowa Cubs
Kevin Gowdy	Pitcher	Frisco RoughRiders / Tulsa Drillers
Jesse Hahn	Pitcher	N/A
Elieser Hernández	Pitcher	St. Lucie Mets / Brooklyn Cyclones / Syracuse Mets
Daniel Hudson	Pitcher	Los Angeles Dodgers
Dinelson Lamet	Pitcher	Colorado Rockies / Boston Red Sox
T. J. McFarland	Pitcher	New York Mets
Michael Petersen	Pitcher	Hartford Yard Goats / Albuquerque Isotopes
River Ryan	Pitcher	Tulsa Drillers / Oklahoma City Dodgers
Eduardo Salazar	Pitcher	Cincinnati Reds
Justin Wilson	Pitcher	Nashville Sounds
Chris Okey	Catcher	Los Angeles Angels
Dalton Rushing	Catcher	Great Lakes Loons
Jonathan Araúz	Infielder	New York Mets
Austin Gauthier	Infielder	Great Lakes Loons / Tulsa Drillers
Chris Owings	Infielder	Pittsburgh Pirates
Kevin Padlo	Infielder	Los Angeles Angels
Trey Sweeney	Infielder	Somerset Patriots
Drew Avans	Outfielder	Oklahoma City Dodgers
José Ramos	Outfielder	Tulsa Drillers
Travis Swaggerty	Outfielder	Bradenton Marauders / Greensboro Grasshoppers / Indianapolis Indians
Ryan Ward	Outfielder	Oklahoma City Dodgers

The Dodgers began spring training on February 8, 2024, when pitchers and catchers reported to Camelback Ranch in Glendale, Arizona with the first full squad workout on February 14 and the first Cactus League game on February 22. They finished 13–5–1 in the league schedule.

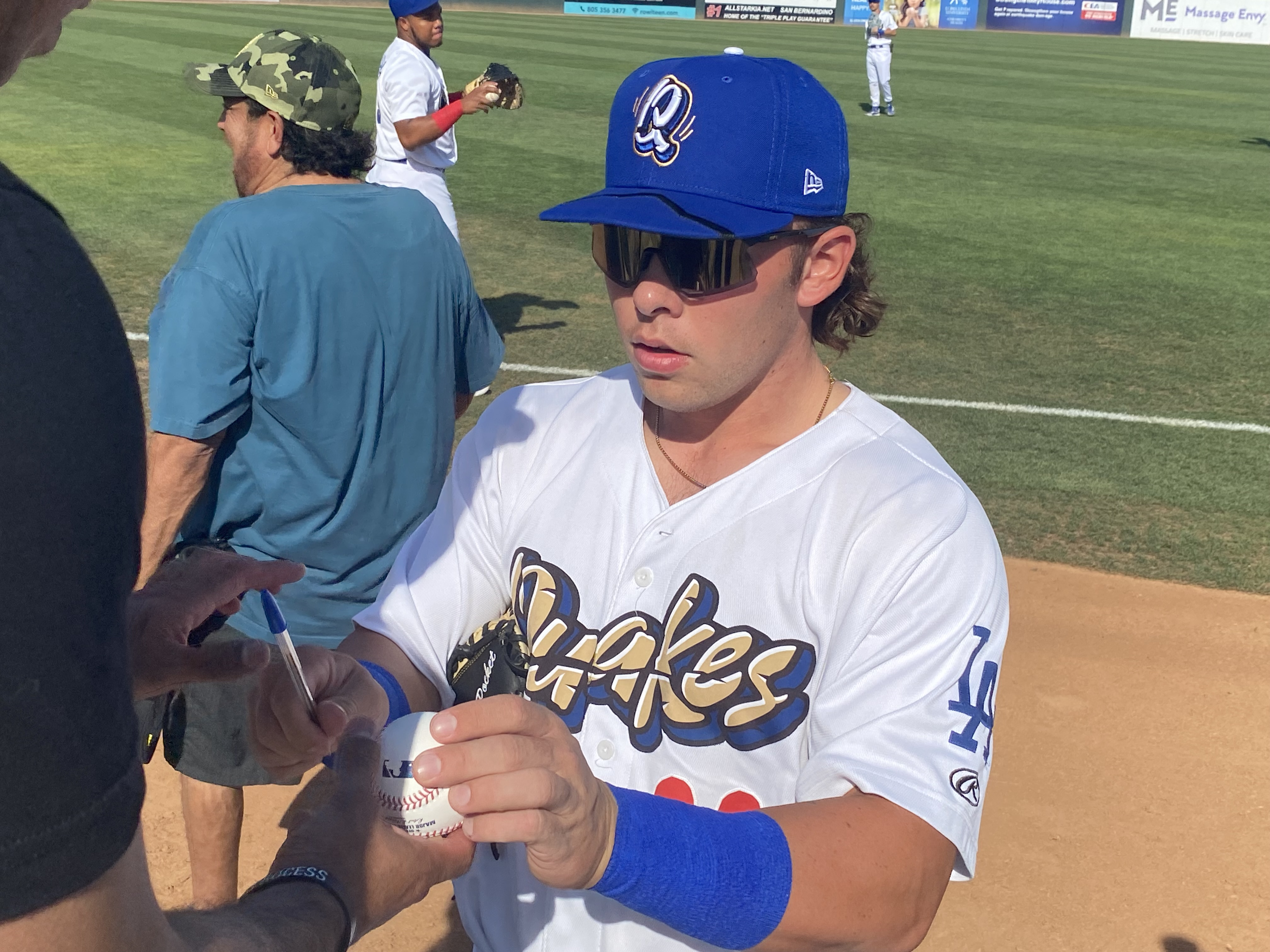
Top prospect Dalton Rushing participated in the Spring Breakout Game during Spring Training

Both Dustin May and Tony Gonsolin were placed on the 60-day injured list at the start of camp as they recovered from their arm surgeries. On February 26, the Dodgers traded outfielder Manuel Margot to the Minnesota Twins and re-signed utility player Kiké Hernández to a one-year contract. On March 4, they acquired infielder Andre Lipcius from the Detroit Tigers for cash considerations and moved Clayton Kershaw to the 60-day injured list to make room on the roster. On March 11, the Dodgers announced that Tyler Glasnow would be the opening day starting pitcher. Lipcius was designated for assignment on March 16, when pitcher Daniel Hudson was added to the roster.

On March 16, several Dodgers minor leaguers participated in the inaugural "Spring Breakout" showcase, playing against a team of minor leaguers from the Los Angeles Angels organization. The Dodgers roster included top prospect Dalton Rushing

This season the Dodgers played exhibition games in South Korea against the Kiwoom Heroes and the Korea national baseball team on March 17 and 18 before opening the regular season with two games against the San Diego Padres at Gocheok Sky Dome as part of MLB World Tour. They then played three exhibition games in the Freeway Series against the Angels before the rest of the regular season commenced.

== Regular season ==
=== Season standings ===
==== National League West ====
NL West
Team	W	L	Pct.	GB	Home	Road
Los Angeles Dodgers	98	64	.605	—	52‍–‍29	46‍–‍35
San Diego Padres	93	69	.574	5	45‍–‍36	48‍–‍33
Arizona Diamondbacks	89	73	.549	9	44‍–‍37	45‍–‍36
San Francisco Giants	80	82	.494	18	42‍–‍39	38‍–‍43
Colorado Rockies	61	101	.377	37	37‍–‍44	24‍–‍57

==== National League Wild Card ====
Wild Card standings

Division leaders
Team	W	L	Pct.
Los Angeles Dodgers	98	64	.605
Philadelphia Phillies	95	67	.586
Milwaukee Brewers	93	69	.574

Wild Card teams (Top 3 teams qualify for postseason)
Team	W	L	Pct.	GB
San Diego Padres	93	69	.574	+4
Atlanta Braves	89	73	.549	—
New York Mets	89	73	.549	—
Arizona Diamondbacks	89	73	.549	—
St. Louis Cardinals	83	79	.512	6
Chicago Cubs	83	79	.512	6
San Francisco Giants	80	82	.494	9
Cincinnati Reds	77	85	.475	12
Pittsburgh Pirates	76	86	.469	13
Washington Nationals	71	91	.438	18
Miami Marlins	62	100	.383	27
Colorado Rockies	61	101	.377	28

==== Record vs. opponents ====
NL Records

2024 National League record Source: MLB Standings Grid – 2024
Team	AZ	ATL	CHC	CIN	COL	LAD	MIA	MIL	NYM	PHI	PIT	SD	SF	STL	WSH	AL
Arizona	—	2–5	3–3	5–1	9–4	6–7	4–2	4–3	3–4	4–3	4–2	6–7	7–6	3–3	5–1	24–22
Atlanta	5–2	—	4–2	2–4	3–3	2–5	9–4	2–4	7–6	7–6	3–3	3–4	4–3	2–4	5–8	31–15
Chicago	3–3	2–4	—	5–8	4–2	4–2	4–3	5–8	3–4	2–4	7–6	2–4	3–4	6–7	6–1	27–19
Cincinnati	1–5	4–2	8–5	—	6–1	4–3	5–2	4–9	2–4	4–3	5–8	2–4	2–4	7–6	2–4	21–25
Colorado	4–9	3–3	2–4	1–6	—	3–10	2–5	4–3	2–4	2–4	2–4	8–5	3–10	3–4	2–4	20–26
Los Angeles	7–6	5–2	2–4	3–4	10–3	—	5–1	4–3	4–2	1–5	4–2	5–8	9–4	5–2	4–2	30–16
Miami	2–4	4–9	3–4	2–5	5–2	1–5	—	4–2	6–7	6–7	0–7	2–4	3–3	3–3	2–11	19–27
Milwaukee	3–4	4–2	8–5	9–4	3–4	3–4	2–4	—	5–1	2–4	7–6	2–5	4–2	8–5	2–4	31–15
New York	4–3	6–7	4–3	4–2	4–2	2–4	7–6	1–5	—	6–7	5–2	5–2	2–4	4–2	11–2	24–22
Philadelphia	3–4	6–7	4–2	3–4	4–2	5–1	7–6	4–2	7–6	—	3–4	5–1	5–2	4–2	9–4	26–20
Pittsburgh	2–4	3–3	6–7	8–5	4–2	2–4	7–0	6–7	2–5	4–3	—	0–6	2–4	5–8	4–3	20–26
San Diego	7–6	4–3	4–2	4–2	5–8	8–5	4–2	5–2	2–5	1–5	6–0	—	7–6	3–4	6–0	27–19
San Francisco	6–7	3–4	4–3	4–2	10–3	4–9	3–3	2–4	4–2	2–5	4–2	6–7	—	1–5	4–3	23–23
St. Louis	3–3	4–2	7–6	6–7	4–3	2–5	3–3	5–8	2–4	2–4	8–5	4–3	5–1	—	4–3	24–22
Washington	1–5	8–5	1–6	4–2	4–2	2–4	11–2	4–2	2–11	4–9	3–4	0–6	3–4	3–4	—	21–25

Updated with the results of all games through September 30, 2024.
NL vs. AL Records

2024 National League record vs. American League Source: MLB Standings
Team	BAL	BOS	CWS	CLE	DET	HOU	KC	LAA	MIN	NYY	OAK	SEA	TB	TEX	TOR
Arizona	1–2	3–0	2–1	3–0	1–2	1–2	2–1	2–1	1–2	1–2	2–1	1–2	0–3	2–2	2–1
Atlanta	1–2	3–1	1–2	2–1	3–0	3–0	2–1	2–1	3–0	2–1	2–1	1–2	2–1	2–1	2–1
Chicago	3–0	1–2	4–0	0–3	2–1	3–0	2–1	2–1	2–1	1–2	1–2	2–1	1–2	1–2	2–1
Cincinnati	0–3	1–2	3–0	1–3	0–3	3–0	0–3	3–0	2–1	3–0	1–2	0–3	1–2	1–2	2–1
Colorado	1–2	2–1	1–2	2–1	1–2	0–4	2–1	2–1	1–2	1–2	1–2	1–2	1–2	3–0	1–2
Los Angeles	2–1	3–0	3–0	2–1	1–2	1–2	2–1	2–2	2–1	2–1	2–1	3–0	2–1	1–2	2–1
Miami	2–1	0–3	2–1	1–2	2–1	0–3	1–2	0–3	2–1	1–2	1–2	2–1	1–3	1–2	3–0
Milwaukee	2–1	2–1	3–0	3–0	2–1	1–2	1–2	2–1	3–1	1–2	2–1	2–1	2–1	3–0	2–1
New York	2–1	3–0	3–0	0–3	1–2	1–2	2–1	1–2	2–1	4–0	1–2	0–3	0–3	2–1	2–1
Philadelphia	1–2	1–2	3–0	1–2	2–1	2–1	2–1	2–1	1–2	0–3	1–2	1–2	3–0	3–0	3–1
Pittsburgh	2–1	0–3	3–0	1–2	2–2	2–1	1–2	1–2	2–1	2–1	0–3	2–1	1–2	1–2	1–2
San Diego	2–1	2–1	3–0	2–1	2–1	2–1	2–1	0–3	2–1	1–2	3–0	1–3	2–1	2–1	1–2
San Francisco	2–1	1–2	2–1	1–2	2–1	2–1	3–0	1–2	2–1	0–3	2–2	1–2	1–2	2–1	1–2
St. Louis	3–0	2–1	1–2	2–1	1–2	1–2	1–3	2–1	2–1	2–1	2–1	1–2	2–1	2–1	0–3
Washington	2–2	1–2	1–2	1–2	2–1	2–1	0–3	2–1	1–2	2–1	1–2	2–1	1–2	1–2	2–1

Updated with the results of all games through September 30, 2024.

=== Game log ===
Legend
	Dodgers win
	Dodgers loss
	Postponement
	Clinched playoff spot
	Clinched division
**Bold**	Dodgers team member

2024 Game Log: 98–64 (Home: 52–29; Away: 46–35)
March/April: 19–13 (Home: 9–8; Away: 10–5)

#	Date	Opponent	Score	Win	Loss	Save	Attendance	Record
1	March 20	@ Padres*	**W** 5–2	**Hudson** (1–0)	Brito (0–1)	**Phillips** (1)	15,952	1–0
2	March 21	Padres*	L 11–15	King (1–0)	**Yamamoto** (0–1)	Suárez (1)	15,928	1–1
3	March 28	Cardinals	**W** 7–1	**Glasnow** (1–0)	Mikolas (0–1)	**Yarbrough** (1)	52,667	2–1
4	March 29	Cardinals	**W** 6–3	**Miller** (1–0)	Thompson (0–1)	**Phillips** (2)	47,524	3–1
5	March 30	Cardinals	L 5–6 (10)	Helsley (1–0)	**Hurt** (0–1)	Gallegos (1)	45,019	3–2
6	March 31	Cardinals	**W** 5–4	**Crismatt** (1–0)	King (0–1)	**Hudson** (1)	41,014	4–2
7	April 1	Giants	**W** 8–3	**Paxton** (1–0)	Winn (0–1)	—	49,044	5–2
8	April 2	Giants	**W** 5–4	**Yarbrough** (1–0)	Webb (0–1)	**Phillips** (3)	49,365	6–2
9	April 3	Giants	**W** 5–4	**Glasnow** (2–0)	Harrison (1–1)	**Lamet** (1)	52,746	7–2
10	April 5	@ Cubs	L 7–9	Smyly (1–1)	**Miller** (1–1)	Alzolay (1)	34,981	7–3
11	April 6	@ Cubs	**W** 4–1	**Yamamoto** (1–1)	Wicks (0–1)	—	41,040	8–3
12	April 7	@ Cubs	L 1–8	Almonte (1–0)	**Stone** (0–1)	Palencia (1)	38,322	8–4
13	April 8	@ Twins	**W** 4–2	**Paxton** (2–0)	Jackson (0–1)	**Phillips** (4)	15,177	9–4
14	April 9	@ Twins	**W** 6–3	**Glasnow** (3–0)	Varland (0–2)	—	17,024	10–4
15	April 10	@ Twins	L 2–3	Funderburk (1–0)	**Vesia** (0–1)	Okert (1)	18,640	10–5
16	April 12	Padres	L 7–8 (11)	Suárez (1–0)	**Vesia** (0–2)	—	49,606	10–6
17	April 13	Padres	**W** 5–2	**Stone** (1–1)	Cosgrove (0–1)	**Phillips** (5)	44,582	11–6
18	April 14	Padres	L 3–6	Matsui (2–0)	**Feyereisen** (0–1)	Suárez (5)	49,432	11–7
19	April 15	Nationals	L 4–6	Parker (1–0)	**Glasnow** (3–1)	Finnegan (6)	42,677	11–8
20	April 16	Nationals	**W** 6–2	**Yarbrough** (2–0)	Corbin (0–3)	—	52,718	12–8
21	April 17	Nationals	L 0–2	Irvin (1–1)	**Knack** (0–1)	Finnegan (7)	44,428	12–9
22	April 19	Mets	L 4–9	Garrett (3–0)	**Hudson** (1–1)	—	44,783	12–10
23	April 20	Mets	L 4–6	Tonkin (1–2)	**Yarbrough** (2–1)	Garrett (1)	45,373	12–11
24	April 21	Mets	**W** 10–0	**Glasnow** (4–1)	Houser (0–2)	—	49,287	13–11
25	April 23	@ Nationals	**W** 4–1	**Vesia** (1–2)	Harvey (1–1)	**Phillips** (6)	27,806	14–11
26	April 24	@ Nationals	**W** 11–2	**Knack** (1–1)	Irvin (1–2)	—	26,298	15–11
27	April 25	@ Nationals	**W** 2–1	**Yamamoto** (2–1)	Gore (2–2)	**Phillips** (7)	24,185	16–11
28	April 26	@ Blue Jays	**W** 12–2	**Stone** (2–1)	Bassitt (2–4)	—	39,688	17–11
29	April 27	@ Blue Jays	**W** 4–2	**Glasnow** (5–1)	Kikuchi (2–2)	**Phillips** (8)	39,405	18–11
30	April 28	@ Blue Jays	L 1–3	Gausman (1–3)	**Grove** (0–1)	Romano (4)	39,053	18–12
31	April 29	@ Diamondbacks	**W** 8–4	**Paxton** (3–0)	Henry (1–2)	—	36,985	19–12
32	April 30	@ Diamondbacks	L 3–4 (10)	McGough (1–3)	**Crismatt** (1–1)	—	28,667	19–13
*March 20 and 21 games played at Gocheok Sky Dome in Seoul, South Korea

May: 17–10 (Home: 10–4; Away: 7–6)

#	Date	Opponent	Score	Win	Loss	Save	Attendance	Record
33	May 1	@ Diamondbacks	**W** 8–0	**Yamamoto** (3–1)	Montgomery (1–2)	—	34,088	20–13
34	May 3	Braves	**W** 4–3 (11)	**Grove** (1–1)	Chavez (1–1)	—	50,859	21–13
35	May 4	Braves	**W** 11–2	**Glasnow** (6–1)	Elder (1–1)	—	44,474	22–13
36	May 5	Braves	**W** 5–1	**Paxton** (4–0)	Fried (2–1)	—	52,733	23–13
37	May 6	Marlins	**W** 6–3	**Yarbrough** (3–1)	Muñoz (1–1)	**Vesia** (1)	44,970	24–13
38	May 7	Marlins	**W** 8–2	**Yamamoto** (4–1)	Cabrera (1–2)	—	51,496	25–13
39	May 8	Marlins	**W** 3–1	**Stone** (3–1)	Weathers (2–4)	**Hudson** (2)	40,702	26–13
40	May 10	@ Padres	L 1–2	Suárez (2–0)	**Grove** (1–2)	—	43,388	26–14
41	May 11	@ Padres	**W** 5–0	**Paxton** (5–0)	Waldron (1–5)	—	46,701	27–14
42	May 12	@ Padres	L 0–4	Darvish (3–1)	**Buehler** (0–1)	—	43,881	27–15
43	May 13	@ Giants	**W** 6–4 (10)	**Treinen** (1–0)	Rogers (1–2)	**Feyereisen** (1)	35,033	28–15
44	May 14	@ Giants	**W** 10–2	**Stone** (4–1)	Winn (3–6)	—	35,575	29–15
45	May 15	@ Giants	L 1–4	Webb (4–4)	**Hernández** (0–1)	Doval (7)	36,027	29–16
46	May 16	Reds	L 2–7	Martinez (1–2)	**Glasnow** (6–2)	—	53,527	29–17
47	May 17	Reds	**W** 7–3	**Grove** (2–2)	Cruz (1–5)	—	46,832	30–17
48	May 18	Reds	**W** 4–0	**Buehler** (1–1)	Ashcraft (3–3)	—	49,239	31–17
49	May 19	Reds	**W** 3–2 (10)	**Banda** (1–0)	Díaz (1–3)	—	52,656	32–17
50	May 20	Diamondbacks	**W** 6–4	**Yamamoto** (5–1)	Cecconi (1–4)	**Hudson** (3)	37,634	33–17
51	May 21	Diamondbacks	L 3–7	Pfaadt (2–3)	**Stone** (4–2)	—	46,180	33–18
52	May 22	Diamondbacks	L 0–6	Nelson (3–3)	**Glasnow** (6–3)	—	46,593	33–19
53	May 24	@ Reds	L 6–9	Ashcraft (4–3)	**Y. Ramírez** (0–2)	—	40,074	33–20
54	May 25	@ Reds	L 1–3	Greene (3–2)	**Buehler** (1–2)	Díaz (9)	41,880	33–21
55	May 26	@ Reds	L 1–4	Martinez (2–3)	**Yamamoto** (5–2)	Díaz (10)	35,619	33–22
56	May 27	@ Mets	Postponed (rain); Makeup: May 28					
56	May 28 (1)	@ Mets	**W** 5–2 (10)	**Hudson** (2–1)	López (1–2)	**Treinen** (1)	see 2nd game	34–22
57	May 28 (2)	@ Mets	**W** 3–0	**Stone** (5–2)	Quintana (1–5)	**Vesia** (2)	36,021	35–22
58	May 29	@ Mets	**W** 10–3	**Treinen** (2–0)	Ottavino (1–2)	—	23,890	36–22
59	May 31	Rockies	L 1–4	Hudson (2–7)	**Buehler** (1–3)	Beeks (6)	47,542	36–23

June: 16–10 (Home: 6–4; Away: 10–6)

#	Date	Opponent	Score	Win	Loss	Save	Attendance	Record
60	June 1	Rockies	**W** 4–1	**Yamamoto** (6–2)	Quantrill (4–4)	**Phillips** (9)	50,182	37–23
61	June 2	Rockies	**W** 4–0	**Stone** (6–2)	Gomber (1–3)	—	48,251	38–23
62	June 4	@ Pirates	L 0–1	Jones (4–5)	**Glasnow** (6–4)	Bednar (12)	24,168	38–24
63	June 5	@ Pirates	L 6–10	Skenes (3–0)	**Paxton** (5–1)	—	29,716	38–25
64	June 6	@ Pirates	**W** 11–7	**Grove** (3–2)	Falter (3–3)	—	22,752	39–25
65	June 7	@ Yankees	**W** 2–1 (11)	**Grove** (4–2)	Hamilton (0–1)	**Ramírez** (1)	48,048	40–25
66	June 8	@ Yankees	**W** 11–3	**Stone** (7–2)	Cortés Jr. (3–5)	—	48,374	41–25
67	June 9	@ Yankees	L 4–6	Ferguson (1–3)	**Glasnow** (6–5)	Holmes (19)	48,023	41–26
68	June 11	Rangers	**W** 15–2	**Paxton** (6–1)	Dunning (4–5)	—	51,416	42–26
69	June 12	Rangers	L 2–3	Latz (2–1)	**Buehler** (1–4)	Yates (9)	48,930	42–27
70	June 13	Rangers	L 1–3	Lorenzen (4–3)	**Grove** (4–3)	Yates (10)	50,134	42–28
71	June 14	Royals	**W** 4–3	**Hudson** (3–1)	Smith (0–3)	**Vesia** (3)	49,580	43–28
72	June 15	Royals	L 2–7	Lugo (10–2)	**Treinen** (2–1)	—	50,423	43–29
73	June 16	Royals	**W** 3–0	**Glasnow** (7–5)	Singer (4–3)	**Phillips** (10)	52,789	44–29
74	June 17	@ Rockies	**W** 9–5	**Paxton** (7–1)	Quantrill (6–5)	—	32,021	45–29
75	June 18	@ Rockies	**W** 11–9	**Petersen** (1–0)	Vodnik (1–1)	**Phillips** (11)	33,791	46–29
76	June 19	@ Rockies	L 6–7	Beeks (3–3)	**Y. Ramírez** (0–3)	—	37,503	46–30
77	June 20	@ Rockies	**W** 5–3	**Stone** (8–2)	Blach (3–5)	**Phillips** (12)	40,236	47–30
78	June 21	Angels	L 2–3 (10)	García (2–0)	**Phillips** (0–1)	Estévez (14)	51,841	47–31
79	June 22	Angels	**W** 7–2	**Glasnow** (8–5)	Plesac (1–1)	—	53,273	48–31
80	June 24	@ White Sox	**W** 3–0	**Hudson** (4–1)	Wilson (1–5)	**Vesia** (4)	25,070	49–31
81	June 25	@ White Sox	**W** 4–3	**Petersen** (2–0)	Flexen (2–7)	**Phillips** (13)	23,662	50–31
82	June 26	@ White Sox	**W** 4–0	**Stone** (9–2)	Fedde (5–3)	—	36,225	51–31
83	June 28	@ Giants	L 3–5	Doval (3–1)	**Treinen** (2–2)	—	40,052	51–32
84	June 29	@ Giants	**W** 14–7 (11)	**Hudson** (5–1)	Hjelle (3–2)	—	39,663	52–32
85	June 30	@ Giants	L 4–10	Bivens (2–1)	**Paxton** (7–2)	—	40,428	52–33

July: 11–13 (Home: 9–4; Away: 2–9)

#	Date	Opponent	Score	Win	Loss	Save	Attendance	Record
86	July 2	Diamondbacks	**W** 6–5	**Phillips** (1–1)	Sewald (0–1)	—	52,931	53–33
87	July 3	Diamondbacks	L 4–12	Jarvis (1–2)	**Yarbrough** (3–2)	—	47,965	53–34
88	July 4	Diamondbacks	L 3–9	Martínez (3–0)	**Knack** (1–2)	—	52,320	53–35
89	July 5	Brewers	**W** 8–5	**Hudson** (6–1)	Peguero (5–3)	**Phillips** (14)	49,885	54–35
90	July 6	Brewers	**W** 5–3	**Phillips** (2–0)	Hudson (4–1)	**Vesia** (5)	50,086	55–35
91	July 7	Brewers	L 2–9	Junis (1–0)	**Wrobleski** (0–1)	—	43,528	55–36
92	July 9	@ Phillies	L 1–10	Wheeler (10–4)	**Miller** (1–2)	—	43,065	55–37
93	July 10	@ Phillies	L 3–4	Sánchez (7–4)	**Stone** (9–3)	Hoffman (9)	42,912	55–38
94	July 11	@ Phillies	L 1–5	Nola (11–4)	**Banda** (1–2)	—	44,020	55–39
95	July 12	@ Tigers	**W** 4–3	**Petersen** (3–0)	Foley (2–3)	**Hudson** (4)	42,060	56–39
96	July 13	@ Tigers	L 9–11 (10)	Vest (2–3)	**Y. Ramírez** (0–4)	—	40,196	56–40
97	July 14	@ Tigers	L 3–4	Faedo (4–1)	**Y. Ramírez** (0–5)	—	35,159	56–41
–	July 16	94th All-Star Game	National League vs. American League (Globe Life Field, Arlington, Texas)					
98	July 19	Red Sox	**W** 4–1	**Yarbrough** (4–2)	Bernardino (3–3)	**Hudson** (5)	51,562	57–41
99	July 20	Red Sox	**W** 7–6 (11)	**Treinen** (3–2)	Weissert (2–2)	—	48,129	58–41
100	July 21	Red Sox	**W** 9–6	**Paxton** (8–2)	Crawford (6–8)	**Hudson** (6)	50,824	59–41
101	July 22	Giants	**W** 3–2	**Treinen** (4–2)	Miller (3–3)	**Hudson** (7)	49,576	60–41
102	July 23	Giants	**W** 5–2	**Knack** (2–2)	Hicks (4–7)	**Phillips** (15)	52,627	61–41
103	July 24	Giants	L 3–8	Ray (1–0)	**Glasnow** (8–6)	—	54,070	61–42
104	July 25	Giants	**W** 6–4	**Treinen** (5–2)	Rogers (1–4)	**Honeywell Jr.** (1)	52,291	62–42
105	July 26	@ Astros	L 0–5	Valdez (9–5)	**Stone** (9–4)	—	41,452	62–43
106	July 27	@ Astros	L 6–7	Hader (4–5)	**Treinen** (5–3)	—	41,819	62–44
107	July 28	@ Astros	**W** 6–2	**Ryan** (1–0)	Arrighetti (4–9)	—	41,418	63–44
108	July 30	@ Padres	L 5–6 (10)	Suárez (6–1)	**Vesia** (1–3)	—	47,559	63–45
109	July 31	@ Padres	L 1–8	Cease (11–8)	**Kershaw** (0–1)	—	46,997	63–46

August: 19–8 (Home: 11–4; Away: 8–4)

#	Date	Opponent	Score	Win	Loss	Save	Attendance	Record
110	August 2	@ Athletics	L 5–6	Estes (5–4)	**Stone** (9–5)	—	21,060	63–47
111	August 3	@ Athletics	**W** 10–0	**Flaherty** (8–5)	Spence (7–7)	—	35,207	64–47
112	August 4	@ Athletics	**W** 3–2	**Vesia** (2–3)	Bido (2–3)	**Banda** (1)	25,544	65–47
113	August 5	Phillies	**W** 5–3	**Glasnow** (9–6)	Nola (11–5)	**Hudson** (8)	48,178	66–47
114	August 6	Phillies	L 2–6	Sánchez (8–7)	**Kershaw** (0–2)	—	47,150	66–48
115	August 7	Phillies	L 4–9	Phillips (4–1)	**Vesia** (2–4)	—	45,003	66–49
116	August 9	Pirates	**W** 9–5	**Flaherty** (9–5)	Keller (10–6)	—	48,664	67–49
117	August 10	Pirates	**W** 4–1	**Kopech** (3–8)	Skenes (6–2)	—	50,697	68–49
118	August 11	Pirates	**W** 6–5 (10)	**Phillips** (3–0)	Bednar (3–5)	—	50,389	69–49
119	August 12	@ Brewers	**W** 5–2	**Kershaw** (1–2)	Peralta (7–7)	**Hudson** (9)	33,618	70–49
120	August 13	@ Brewers	**W** 7–2	**Stone** (10–5)	Rea (10–4)	**Knack** (1)	29,174	71–49
121	August 14	@ Brewers	L 4–5	Payamps (3–5)	**Honeywell Jr.** (0–1)	Williams (2)	31,084	71–50
122	August 15	@ Brewers	L 4–6	Hudson (5–1)	**Hudson** (6–2)	Williams (3)	40,447	71–51
123	August 16	@ Cardinals	**W** 7–6	**Wrobleski** (1–1)	Mikolas (8–10)	**Kopech** (10)	38,485	72–51
124	August 17	@ Cardinals	L 2–5	Pallante (5–6)	**Miller** (1–3)	Helsley (38)	41,929	72–52
125	August 18	@ Cardinals	**W** 2–1	**Kershaw** (2–2)	Gray (11–8)	**Kopech** (11)	40,246	73–52
126	August 19	Mariners	**W** 3–0	**Stone** (11–5)	Woo (5–2)	**Phillips** (16)	51,348	74–52
127	August 20	Mariners	**W** 6–3	**Kelly** (1–0)	Muñoz (2–5)	**Hudson** (10)	48,395	75–52
128	August 21	Mariners	**W** 8–4	**Flaherty** (10–5)	Gilbert (7–10)	—	45,295	76–52
129	August 23	Rays	**W** 7–3	**Kopech** (4–8)	Rodríguez (2–3)	—	45,556	77–52
130	August 24	Rays	L 8–9 (10)	Rodríguez (3–3)	**Kelly** (1–1)	Cleavinger (4)	48,488	77–53
131	August 25	Rays	**W** 3–1	**Treinen** (6–3)	Lovelady (3–5)	**Banda** (2)	52,464	78–53
132	August 27	Orioles	L 2–3	Bowman (1–0)	**Flaherty** (10–6)	Domínguez (7)	52,382	78–54
133	August 28	Orioles	**W** 6–4	**Banda** (2–2)	Burnes (12–7)	**Kopech** (12)	53,290	79–54
134	August 29	Orioles	**W** 6–3	**Miller** (2–3)	Povich (1–7)	**Phillips** (17)	53,203	80–54
135	August 30	@ Diamondbacks	**W** 10–9	**Brasier** (1–0)	Floro (5–4)	—	46,606	81–54
136	August 31	@ Diamondbacks	**W** 8–6	**Casparius** (1–0)	Thompson (7–4)	**Phillips** (18)	50,041	82–54

September: 16–10 (Home: 7–5; Away: 9–5)

#	Date	Opponent	Score	Win	Loss	Save	Attendance	Record
137	September 1	@ Diamondbacks	L 3–14	Pfaadt (9–7)	**Wrobleski** (1–2)	—	46,278	82–55
138	September 2	@ Diamondbacks	**W** 11–6	**Flaherty** (11–6)	Rodríguez (2–1)	—	43,747	83–55
139	September 3	@ Angels	**W** 6–2 (10)	**Kopech** (5–8)	Contreras (2–4)	—	44,731	84–55
140	September 4	@ Angels	L 1–10	Canning (5–12)	**Miller** (2–4)	—	44,822	84–56
141	September 6	Guardians	L 1–3	Boyd (2–1)	**Knack** (2–3)	Clase (42)	45,318	84–57
142	September 7	Guardians	**W** 7–2	**Honeywell Jr.** (1–1)	Williams (3–8)	—	48,690	85–57
143	September 8	Guardians	**W** 4–0	**Flaherty** (12–6)	Bibee (11–7)	—	44,207	86–57
144	September 9	Cubs	L 4–10	Thompson (2–1)	**Buehler** (1–5)	—	50,495	86–58
145	September 10	Cubs	L 3–6	Imanaga (13–3)	**Phillips** (3–1)	Hodge (5)	51,923	86–59
146	September 11	Cubs	**W** 10–8	**Vesia** (3–4)	Armstrong (3–3)	**Kopech** (13)	48,691	87–59
147	September 13	@ Braves	L 2–6	Schwellenbach (6–7)	**Knack** (2–4)	—	40,339	87–60
148	September 14	@ Braves	L 1–10	Sale (17–3)	**Flaherty** (12–7)	—	42,732	87–61
149	September 15	@ Braves	**W** 9–2	**Kopech** (6–8)	Iglesias (5–2)	—	39,198	88–61
150	September 16	@ Braves	**W** 9–0	**Phillips** (4–1)	Fried (9–10)	—	37,109	89–61
151	September 17	@ Marlins	L 9–11	Veneziano (1–0)	**Grove** (4–4)	—	17,902	89–62
152	September 18	@ Marlins	**W** 8–4	**Knack** (3–4)	Weathers (3–6)	—	17,138	90–62
153	September 19	@ Marlins	**W** 20–4	**Flaherty** (13–7)	Cabrera (4–8)	—	15,548	91–62
154	September 20	Rockies	**W** 6–4	**Vesia** (4–4)	Freeland (5–8)	**Kopech** (14)	49,073	92–62
155	September 21	Rockies	L 3–6	Vodnik (5–3)	**Buehler** (1–6)	Halvorsen (1)	52,267	92–63
156	September 22	Rockies	**W** 6–5	**Treinen** (7–3)	Halvorsen (2–1)	—	50,730	93–63
157	September 24	Padres	L 2–4	King (13–9)	**Knack** (3–5)	Suárez (35)	50,369	93–64
158	September 25	Padres	**W** 4–3	**Vesia** (5–4)	Estrada (6–3)	**Kopech** (15)	52,310	94–64
159	September 26	Padres	**W** 7–2	**Banda** (3–2)	Scott (9–6)	—	52,433	95–64
160	September 27	@ Rockies	**W** 11–4	**Casparius** (2–0)	Quantrill (8–11)	—	48,750	96–64
161	September 28	@ Rockies	**W** 13–2	**Yamamoto** (7–2)	Senzatela (0–1)	**Wrobleski** (1)	48,395	97–64
162	September 29	@ Rockies	**W** 2–1	**Phillips** (5–1)	Vodnik (5–4)	**Henriquez** (1)	48,320	98–64

Legend: = Win = Loss = Postponement
Bold = Dodgers team member

=== Season summary ===
Opening Day starting lineup
No.	Player	Pos.
Batters
50	Mookie Betts	SS
17	Shohei Ohtani	DH
5	Freddie Freeman	1B
16	Will Smith	C
13	Max Muncy	3B
37	Teoscar Hernández	LF
33	James Outman	CF
23	Jason Heyward	RF
9	Gavin Lux	2B
Starting pitcher
31	Tyler Glasnow	

=== March ===
The Dodgers started their season on March 20 by playing the San Diego Padres at Gocheok Sky Dome in Seoul, South Korea as part of the MLB World Tour. Tyler Glasnow started and allowed two runs in five innings as the Dodgers came from behind to score four runs in the eighth inning to win 5–2. The following day, Yoshinobu Yamamoto made his MLB debut for the Dodgers but only lasted one inning while giving up five runs. Mookie Betts had four hits in five at-bats, including a double and a home run and Will Smith also had four hits as the Dodgers offense produced 11 runs, only to lose 15–11 in a slugfest.

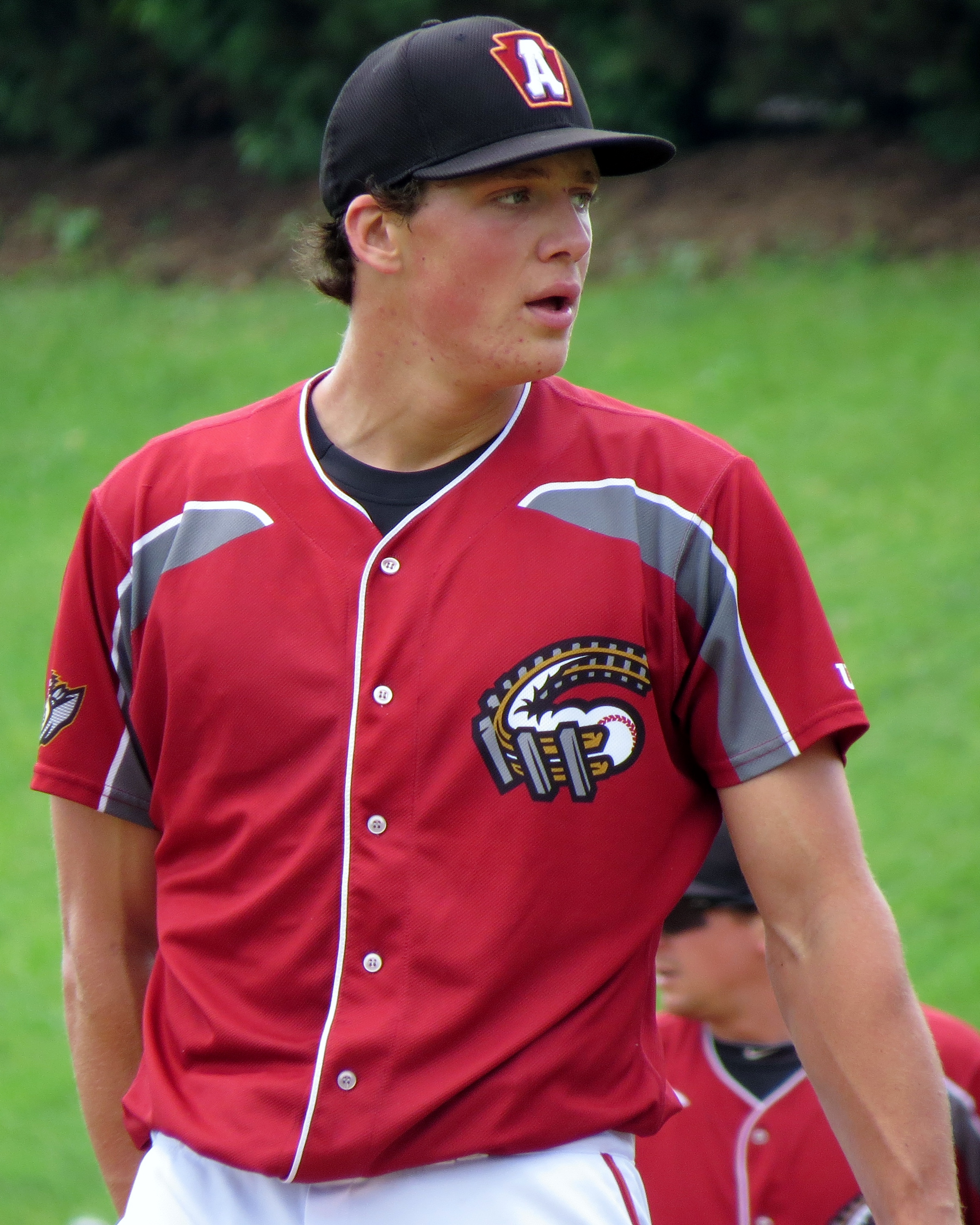
Tyler Glasnow started for the Dodgers on opening day in South Korea

The Dodgers returned to California following the Seoul Series for the three game exhibition Freeway Series before resuming the regular season with the home opener on March 28 against the St. Louis Cardinals at Dodger Stadium. Glasnow allowed one run on two hits in six innings and Betts and Freddie Freeman homered in a 7–1 victory. In the next game, Bobby Miller struck out 11 with only two hits and one walk in six shutout innings while the Dodgers hit four home runs (including two by Teoscar Hernández) in a 6–3 win. Yamamoto made his second start in game 3, allowing only two hits in five scoreless innings while Betts had three hits, including homering in his fourth straight game. However, the Cardinals won the game in 10 innings, 6–5. The Dodgers concluded the series with a come from behind, 5–4 win on March 31 as Max Muncy's two-run home run in the eighth gave them the lead after having trailed 4–0 in the sixth.

=== April ===
April began with a three-game series against the San Francisco Giants. James Paxton made his first start of the season, pitching five shutout innings. Teoscar Hernández homered, Shohei Ohtani doubled and Mookie Betts tripled in an 8–3 victory. Betts homered again in the next game as the Dodgers won, 5–4. They finished the homestand with another 5–4 win during which Ohtani and Miguel Rojas homered.

Bobby Miller gave up five runs in only 1 2/3 innings as the Dodgers began their first road trip of the season with a 9–7 loss to the Chicago Cubs at Wrigley Field on April 5. In the next game, Yoshinobu Yamamoto struck out eight in five scoreless innings for his first major league win, 4–1, over the Cubs. The Cubs took the series with an 8–1 blow out in the finale. The road trip continued at Target Field as the Dodgers played the Minnesota Twins for three games. Home runs by James Outman and Ohtani in the seventh inning helped the Dodgers to a 4–2 comeback victory. In the following game, Tyler Glasnow struck out 14 while allowing only three hits in seven scoreless innings while Outman and Will Smith each hit three-run home runs in a 6–3 win. Miller struggled again in the series finale, allowing two runs on five hits and three walks in just four innings as the Twins won 3–2.

The Dodgers returned home on April 12 to play the San Diego Padres. They hit four home runs in the game, but the Padres matched them and then won in 11 innings, 8–7. The Dodgers evened the series with a 5–2 win the next day. Gavin Stone allowed two runs in a career high 6 2/3 innings in the game. In the series finale, the Dodgers pitching staff issued 14 walks, the most the team had allowed in one game since the 1962 season and lost 6–3. The Washington Nationals came to town for the next series and opened it by beating the Dodgers, 6–4 with a three run fifth inning being the decider. In the next game, Betts had five hits in five at-bats, including two doubles, in a 6–2 win. The Nationals shut out the Dodgers, 2–0, to win the series. Next up was the New York Mets who beat the Dodgers 9–4. The Mets won the next game, 6–4, as the Dodgers left the bases loaded multiple times in the loss. The Dodgers ended the homestand by crushing the Mets, 10–0 on April 21, with eight of the runs scoring in the fifth inning. Ohtani hit his 176th career home run, passing Hideki Matsui for most by a Japanese-born Major Leaguer and Andy Pages hit his first MLB homer as well. Glasnow struck out 10 in eight shutout innings.

The Dodgers went back on the road on April 23 for a three-games series against the Nationals at Nationals Park. They took the opener, 4–1, as Ohtani homered and Kiké Hernández and James Outman had key RBI hits. Landon Knack allowed two runs in six innings to pick up his first major league win as the Dodgers routed the Nationals, 11–2. Betts and Will Smith each had four hits, Ohtani doubled three times and Pages hit his second homer in the game. The Dodgers finished off the sweep with a 2–1 victory in the finale. Yamamoto struck out seven in six scoreless innings and Kiké Hernández homered in the game. The next series was against the Toronto Blue Jays at Rogers Centre. Gavin Stone allowed only two hits and one run in seven innings while the Dodgers hit three home runs en route to a 12–2 victory. Glasnow struck out nine in six innings and Betts had three hits, including a triple, as the Dodgers took the next game, 4–2. Freddie Freeman homered in the finale but it was the only run allowed by Kevin Gausman in his seven innings as the Blue Jays ended the Dodgers winning streak with a 3–1 win. Pages had three RBIs as the Dodgers took the opener of a series against the Arizona Diamondbacks, 8–4, at Chase Field. The Dodgers batters didn't strike out at all in the game, for the first time since the 2006 season. The Diamondbacks won the next game, 4–3, on a walk-off two-run homer by Christian Walker in the 10th inning.

=== May ===
The Dodgers began the month of May by finishing off their series with the Diamondbacks with a 8–0 win. Yoshinobu Yamamoto pitched six shutout innings while Andy Pages and Will Smith homered in the game.

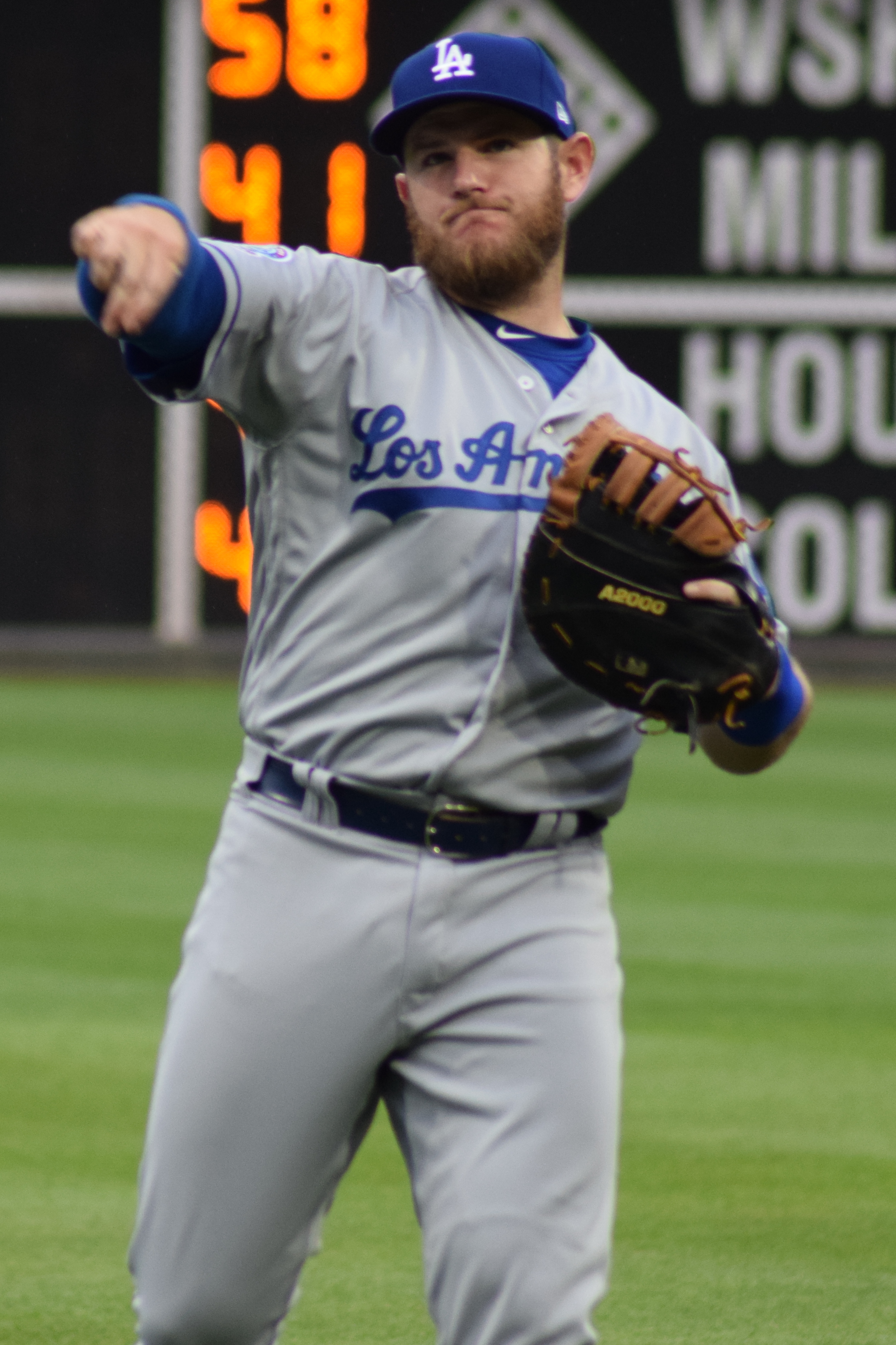
Max Muncy hit three home runs for the Dodgers on May 4 vs the Braves

The Dodgers returned home on May 3 for a three-game weekend series against the Atlanta Braves. Andy Pages had four hits, including a walk-off single in the 11th inning for a 4–3 win. In the following game, Tyler Glasnow struck out 10 in seven innings and the Dodgers hit five homeruns (three of them by Max Muncy) in a 11–2 victory. Ohtani also hit his eighth homerun of the season in that game, breaking Dave Roberts' mark of seven homeruns to become the Japanese-born player with most homers in franchise history. The Dodgers finished off a sweep of the Braves with a 5–1 win in the series finale. Shohei Ohtani had four hits, including two home runs. Walker Buehler rejoined the Dodgers rotation on May 6, having missed most of two seasons after undergoing Tommy John surgery. He allowed three runs in four innings but the Dodgers hit four homeruns and won the game, 6–3. In the next game, Yamamoto allowed two runs in eight innings and Muncy hit a grand slam homer in the first inning, en route to a 8–2 victory. The Dodgers completed an undefeated homestand by sweeping the Marlins with a 3–1 victory in the series finale. Gavin Stone allowed the one run in seven innings while Teoscar Hernández hit a two-run homer in the sixth inning for the go-ahead runs.

The Dodgers went to Petco Park for a series with the San Diego Padres beginning on May 10. Glasnow struck out 10 and allowed only one hit (a solo homer by Luis Campusano) in seven innings but Michael King shut out the Dodgers in his seven innings, allowing only two hits with 11 strikeouts of his own. The Dodgers tied the game on a Freddie Freeman RBI hit in the eighth but lost when Luis Arráez drove in pinch runner Tyler Wade for a walk-off in the ninth, 2–1. In the next game, James Paxton pitched six scoreless innings and Teoscar Hernández hit a grand slam home run in a 5–0 victory. The Padres won the series finale, 4–0, as Yu Darvish allowed only two hits and one walk in seven innings while striking out seven. The Dodgers next traveled to Oracle Park for a series with the San Francisco Giants. Mookie Betts led off the game with a homerun and Will Smith drove in the winning two runs with a double in the 10th inning for a 6–4 win. Ohtani had three hits, including a home run, as the Dodgers followed that up with a 10–2 win. The Giants took the next game, 4–1.

The Dodgers returned home on May 16 to begin a four-game series against the Cincinnati Reds. Elly De La Cruz reached base five times, with four hits and a walk, stole four bases and scored three runs as the Reds won the opener, 7–2. In the following game, the Dodgers got home runs from Betts, Ohtani and Jason Heyward as they won 7–3. Buehler struck out seven in six scoreless innings on May 18 to pick up his first win in almost two years in the Dodgers 4–0 triumph. The Dodgers finished off the series with a 3–2 victory in 10 innings as Ohtani drove in the winning run, his first walk-off with the Dodgers. The Dodgers next played three games against the Arizona Diamondbacks. On May 20, they hit three home runs (including a grand slam by Freddie Freeman) in a six-run third inning en route to a 6–4 win. The Diamondbacks won the next game, 7–3, and then shutout the Dodgers in the finale, 6–0, for their first series win at Dodger Stadium since April of the 2018 season.

The Dodgers went back on the road on May 24 for a three-game series with the Reds at Great American Ball Park. The series opened with the Reds scoring six runs (including a grand slam home run by Jonathan India) in the fifth inning to win 9–6. In the next outing, Hunter Greene held the Dodgers to one run in a 3–1 Reds win and they finished off a sweep of the series with a 4–1 victory in the finale. The Dodgers traveled next to Citi Field to play the New York Mets. After a rainout on Memorial Day, the teams played a doubleheader on May 28. Glasnow struck out eight in the first game in seven innings, while allowing only a two-run homer by Francisco Lindor. Despite that they trailed until tying the game on a suicide squeeze by Chris Taylor in the ninth and then they won the game with three runs in the 10th inning to snap the five game losing streak with a 5–2 win. In the second game, Gavin Stone allowed only three hits while striking out seven in seven scoreless innings, Will Smith hit an opening inning home run and the Dodgers won 3–0. Smith hit two more homeruns in the next game as the Dodgers scored six runs in the eighth inning en route to a 10–3 win.

They returned home on May 31 to play the Colorado Rockies and lost the opener, 4–1, getting only five hits in the game against Dakota Hudson and two relievers. It was the Rockies first win in Los Angeles since the 2022 season.

=== June ===
June began with the Dodgers beating the Rockies, 4–1. Yoshinobu Yamamoto struck out seven in six innings, Andy Pages had three hits and Freddie Freeman tripled in the win. The next day, the Dodgers got first inning home runs from Mookie Betts and Freeman and won the game, 4–0.

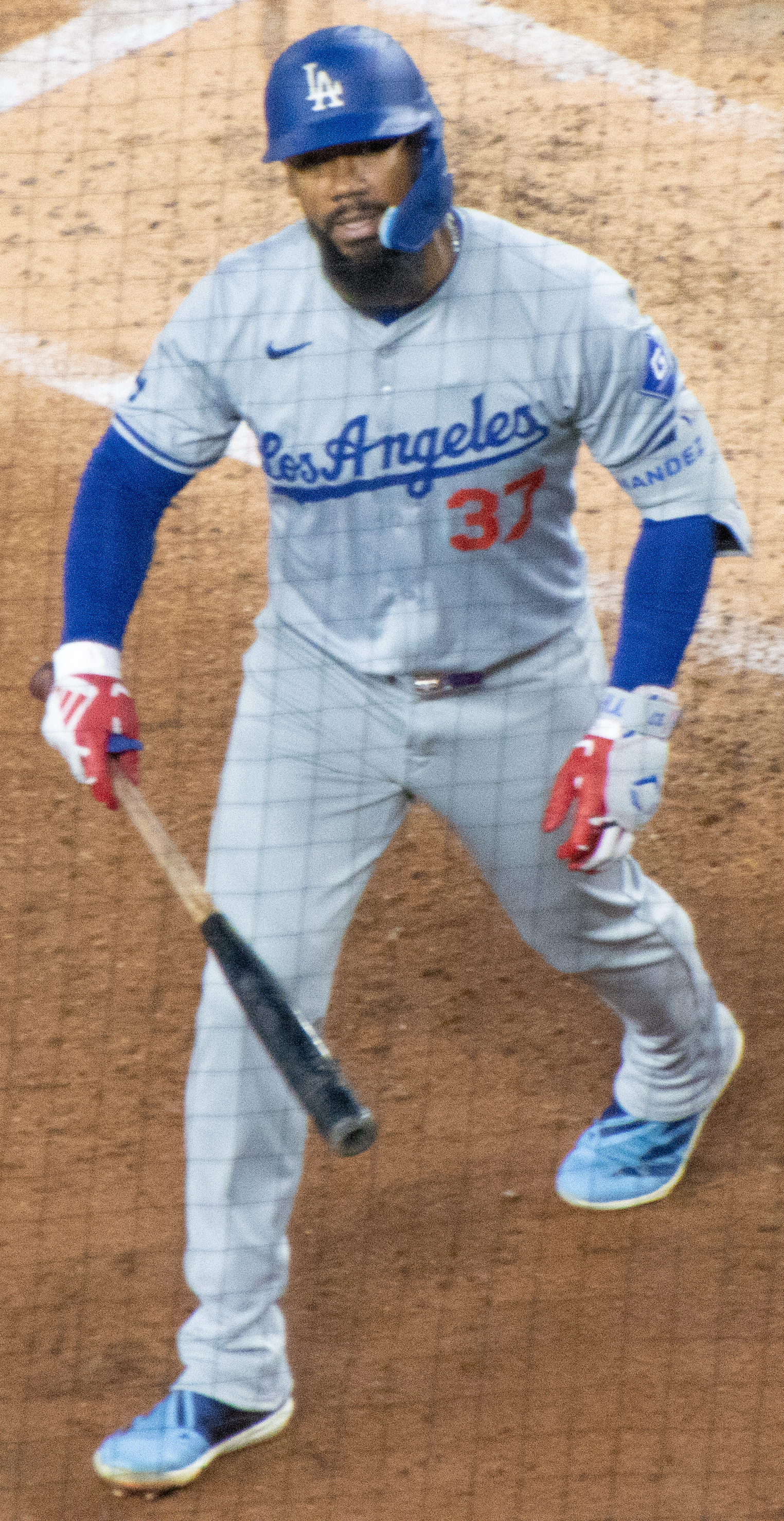
Teoscar Hernández hit two homers, including a grand slam at Yankee Stadium on June 8

After the brief homestand, they were back on the road for three games against the Pittsburgh Pirates at PNC Park. Tyler Glasnow struck out nine while only allowing one run (a solo homer by Jack Suwinski) in six innings but that was all the Pirates needed for a 1–0 win in the first game of the series. In the next game, James Paxton was shelled, allowing six earned runs in 1 2/3 innings of a 10–6 loss. The Dodgers jumped out in the third game with four runs in the first inning thanks to a 3-run homer by Freeman. Teoscar Hernández had three hits, including a home run and Betts also homered as the Dodgers prevented a sweep with a 11–7 win. Next up was an interleague series against the New York Yankees at Yankee Stadium. Yamamoto struck out seven and allowed only two hits in seven scoreless innings but the Dodgers also failed to score in regulation. Teoscar Hernández drove in two runs on a double in the 11th inning as they won the game 2–1. Hernández hit two home runs, including a grand slam, and drove in six as the Dodgers beat the Yankees, 11–3, in the second game of the series. In the finale, Glasnow struck out 12 in six innings but also allowed five runs, including a three-run homer by Trent Grisham in the fifth and the Yankees won 6–4.

The next homestand began on June 11 against the Texas Rangers. The Dodgers hit five home runs, four of them in the seventh inning, in a 15–2 rout in game 1. A three-run home run by Corey Seager in the fifth inning gave the Rangers a 3–2 win in the next game. The Rangers took the series with a 3–1 victory in the finale. Salvador Perez hit a three-run homerun in the fourth to give the Kansas City Royals a lead in the first game of the next series but the Dodgers tied it up in the fifth when Miguel Rojas and Chris Taylor each homered. The Dodgers won 4–3 thanks to a RBI hit by Freeman in the eighth. In the next game, MJ Melendez hit a grand slam off Blake Treinen in the sixth inning and the Royals won 7–2. In the series finale, Glasnow struck out nine while only allowing three hits and one walk in seven innings and the Dodgers hit three solo homeruns, two by Shohei Ohtani and one by Freeman in a 3–0 win.

Next up on the schedule was a four-game road series at Coors Field against the Colorado Rockies. James Paxton struck out eight while only allowing one run on two hits in seven innings, Will Smith tripled, and Ohtani had three hits as the Dodgers held on to win 7–5. In the following game, the Rockies led 9–4 heading into the ninth inning but a grand slam by Jason Heyward and a three-run homer by Hernández gave them an improbable 11–9 come-from-behind victory. Ohtani had two hits and three RBIs in the third game of the series, but the Rockies came from behind and won 7–6 on a walk-off sacrifice fly by Brenton Doyle. The Dodgers won the last game of the series, 5–3. Gavin Stone struck out seven in 5 1/3 innings, Ohtani hit a lead off home run and Smith and Freeman hit back-to-back homers in the fourth.

Next up was a two-game home series against the Los Angeles Angels. In the first game, they took the lead on a two-run homer in the fifth by Ohtani but the Angels came back to tie the game and won 3–2 in 10 innings. Glasnow struck out 10 in seven innings, Ohtani homered for the third consecutive game and Gavin Lux also homered as the Dodgers took the second game, 7–2.

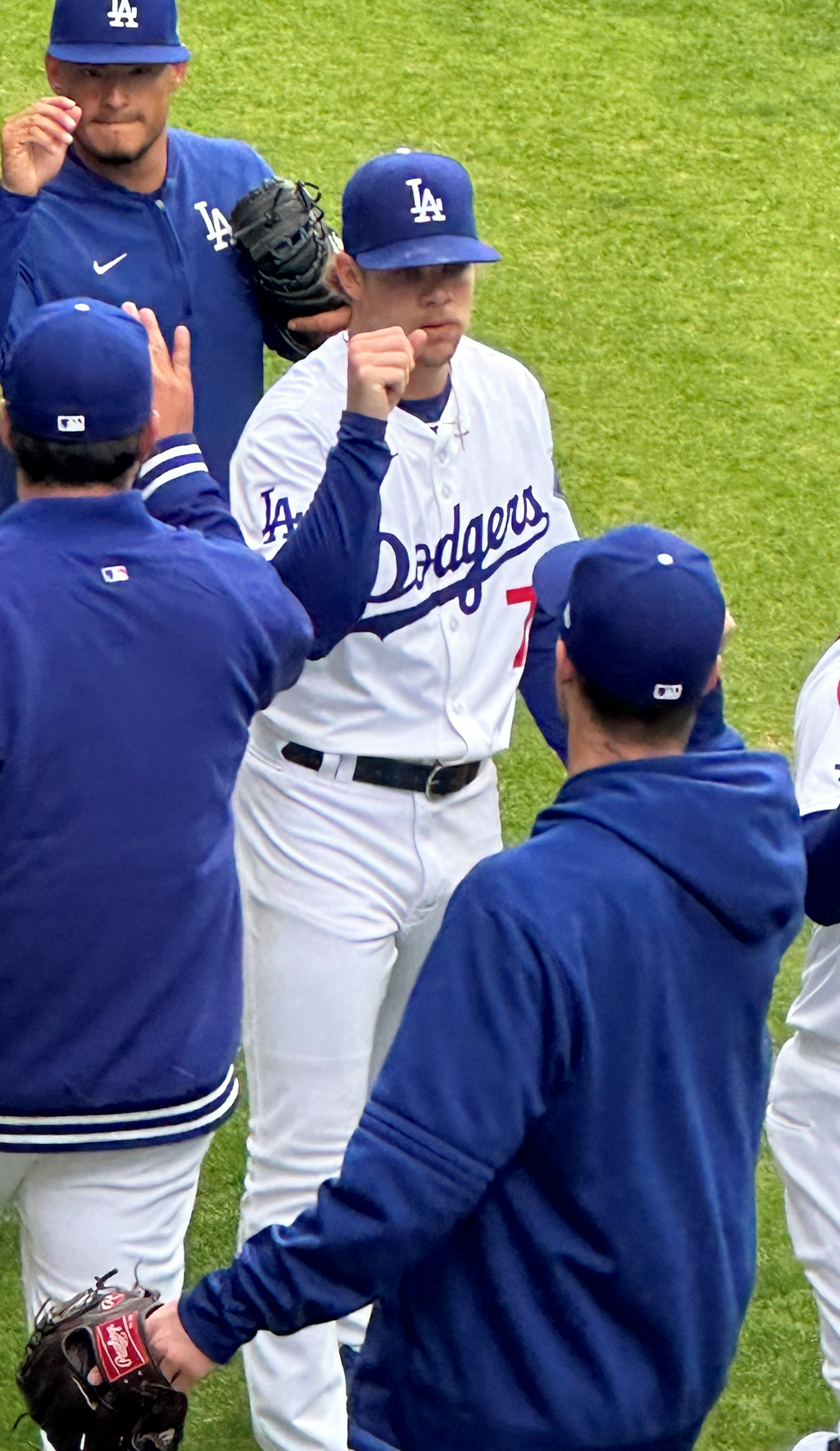
Gavin Stone pitched a complete game shutout on June 26 against the White Sox

On June 24, the Dodgers traveled to Guaranteed Rate Field for a three-game series against the Chicago White Sox. They won 3–0 in the opener. Ohtani again led off the second game with a homer and Freeman also homered in a 4–3 win. It was the ninth straight game with an RBI for Ohtani, tying a Dodger record also held by Roy Campanella (1955), Augie Galan (1944) and Eddie Brown (1924). He homered again to lead off the next game, breaking the record. Stone pitched a complete game, four hit shutout with seven strikeouts as the Dodgers finished off the sweep with a 4–0 win. It was the first shutout by a Dodger pitcher since Walker Buehler in 2022 and first by a rookie pitcher since Hyun-jin Ryu in 2013. They next traveled to Oracle Park and lost the opener to the San Francisco Giants, 5–3, on a walk-off homer by Brett Wisely. In the next game, the Dodgers scored seven runs in the 11th inning to beat the Giants 14–7. However, they were routed by the Giants, 10–4, in the finale of the road trip.

=== July ===
The Dodgers began another homestand on July 2, playing the Arizona Diamondbacks. Shohei Ohtani hit another homer and the Dodgers won 6–5 on a walk-off hit by Teoscar Hernández. Christian Walker had four hits, including a double and two home runs, as the Diamondbacks routed the Dodgers 12–4. Walker hit another two homers in the next game, a 9–3 Diamondbacks win. The next series was against the Milwaukee Brewers. Will Smith had three home runs in the first game and Freddie Freeman drove in the go-ahead run on a hit in the eighth as the Dodgers came from behind to win 8–5. Smith homered again, in his first at-bat of the next game, tying him for the major league record of four home runs in four consecutive at-bats. The Dodgers won 5–3 after home runs by Miguel Vargas and Ohtani in the eighth inning. The Brewers won the last game of the series, 9–2.

The Dodgers next took a trip to Citizens Bank Park to play the top team in the National League, the Philadelphia Phillies. In the opener, Trea Turner hit a grand slam homer in the fourth inning as part of a 10–1 rout. Kyle Schwarber led off the next game with a homer and Matt Strahm struck out Ohtani with two men on base in the seventh inning to preserve a 4–3 win the second game and the Phillies finished off a sweep with a 5–1 win in the finale. They followed that up with a three-game series against the Detroit Tigers at Comerica Park. After falling behind early, the Dodgers came back with a Freeman homer, scoring the eventual winning run on a ground rule double by Ohtani in the ninth for a 4–3 win. In the next game, the Tigers scored five runs in the bottom of the ninth to erase a deficit and then won 11–9 on a walk-off homer by Gio Urshela in the 10th inning. The Dodgers scored three in the first in the final game of the series, but again blew the game in the ninth and lost 4–3.

The Dodgers had six players selected to the 2024 Major League Baseball All-Star Game: Pitcher Tyler Glasnow, catcher Will Smith, first baseman Freddie Freeman, shortstop Mookie Betts, outfielder Teoscar Hernández and designated hitter Shohei Ohtani. Hernández also participated in, and won, the 2024 Major League Baseball Home Run Derby, the first Dodger ever to win it.

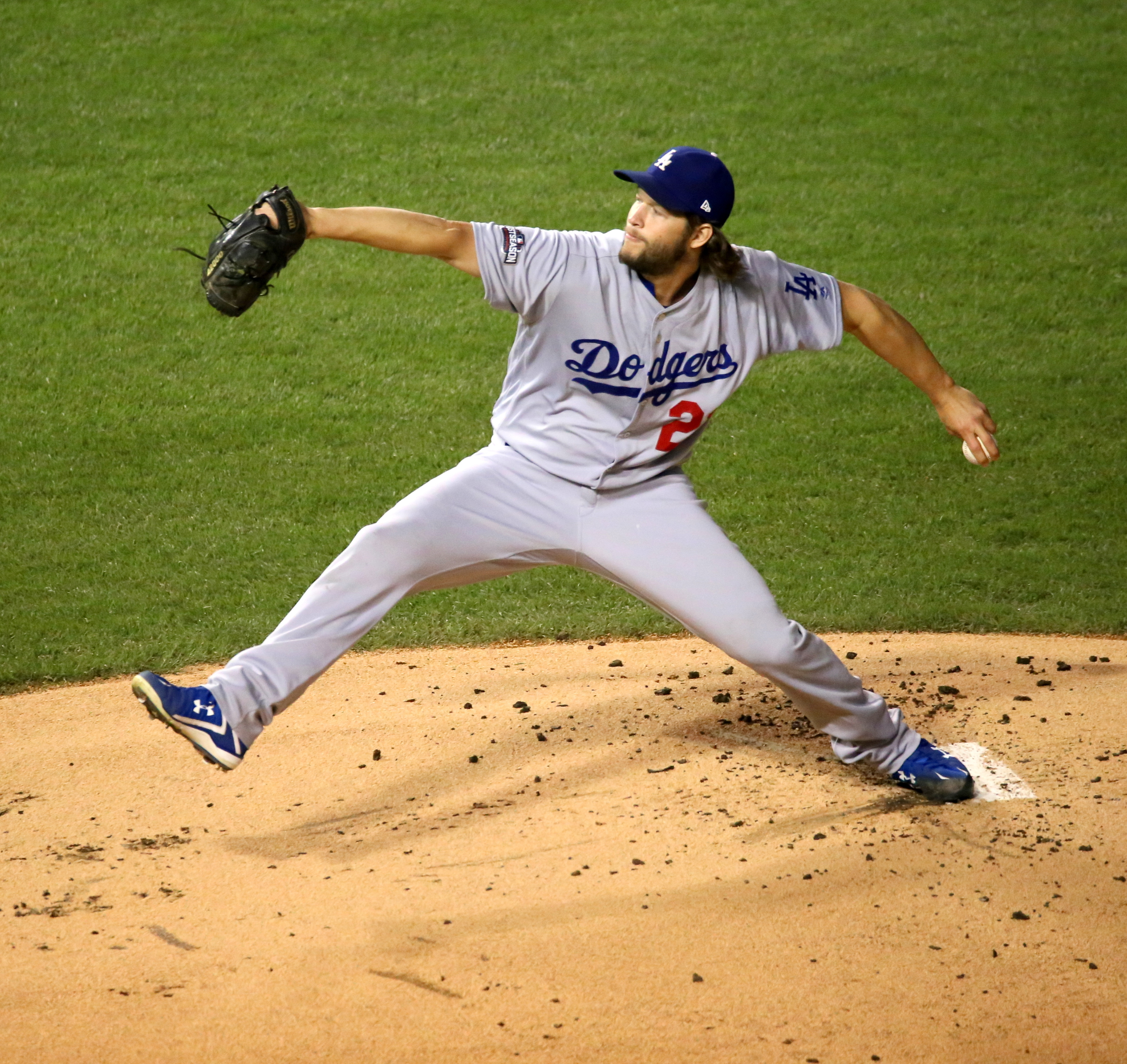
Clayton Kershaw made his first start of the season on July 25

After the all-star break, the Dodgers played a three-game series at home against the Boston Red Sox. They won the opener 4–1 thanks to a grand slam home run by Freeman in the eighth inning. In the next game, the Dodgers trailed going into the ninth inning only for Kiké Hernández to tie the game with a solo home run. Tyler O'Neill hit his second home run of the game in the 10th to put the Red Sox back up by two and Hernández again drove home the tying run, this time with a single. They won the game in the 11th, 7–6, on a Will Smith walk-off hit. The Dodgers hit six home runs in the next game, as part of a 9–6 victory that completed their sweep of the Red Sox. River Ryan made is major league debut in the next game, pitching 5 1/3 innings against the San Francisco Giants. Teoscar Hernández homered and drove in all three runs in a 3–2 win. The Dodgers won again, 5–2, the next day. Gavin Lux had two hits, including a double, and drove in two runs. The Giants scored six runs in the eighth inning in the third game of the series as they won, 8–3. Clayton Kershaw made his first start of the season on July 25, after coming off the injured list, and allowed two runs in four innings. Nick Ahmed and Ohtani hit back-to-back home runs in the eighth inning and the Dodgers finished off the series with a 6–4 win.

The Dodgers next played the Houston Astros at Minute Maid Park, losing the opener 5–0. The Dodgers took a 5–0 lead in the next game, only to lose 7–6 on a walk-off homer by Alex Bregman. River Ryan struck out eight while allowing only one run in 5 2/3 innings in the final game of the series as the Dodgers won 6–2. The Dodgers scored five runs in the first inning of the first game of a two-game series against the San Diego Padres at Petco Park only to see the bullpen again blow the lead and they lost in 10 innings, 6–5. It was the third time in 13 days the Dodgers had blown a lead of five or more runs. The Padres won the next game, 8–1.

=== August ===
The Dodgers began August by playing the Oakland Athletics at Oakland Coliseum. Shohei Ohtani and Teoscar Hernández both homered but the pitching continued to struggle as they lost 6–5. Jack Flaherty, acquired from the Detroit Tigers at the trade deadline, made his Dodgers debut in the following game. He struck out seven in six scoreless innings and the Dodgers broke out of their funk with a 10–0 win. Kiké Hernández doubled twice and drove in two runs in the Dodgers 3–2 win to close out the road trip.

Walter
O'Malley
Owner

Honored
August 11, 2024

The next homestand was against the Philadelphia Phillies. Tyler Glasnow struck out nine in six innings, Teoscar Hernández homered as part of a four-run third, and Ohtani added a late homer in a 5–3 win. The Phillies took the next game, 6–2. Kyle Schwarber homered three times in the Phillies 9–4 victory in the series finale. The next series up was against the Pittsburgh Pirates. Flaherty struck out 10 in 5 2/3 innings and the Dodgers hit three home runs in a 9–5 victory to start the series. Teoscar Hernández had three hits, including a homer and double, as the Dodgers took the next game, 4–1. Hernández drove in the winning run the following day on a walk-off hit in the 10th inning for a 6–5 victory and a series sweep.

The Dodgers traveled to American Family Field on August 12 to play the Milwaukee Brewers. Clayton Kershaw allowed only one run on three hits in 5 2/3 innings while Mookie Betts had two hits, including a homerun, and drove in three in his first game in two months as the Dodgers won 5–2. In the next game, Gavin Stone allowed only one run in five innings, while striking out six, while Will Smith had three hits, including a home run in the 7–2 win. The Brewers took the next game, 5–4. In the final game of the series, the Dodgers fell behind 3–0 in the first, came back to take the lead only to lose 6–4 when the Brewers scored three in the bottom of the eighth. Next up was a three-game series against the St. Louis Cardinals at Busch Stadium. The Dodgers scored five runs in the sixth inning, three of them on a home run by Kevin Kiermaier, as they opened the series with a 7–6 win. Ohtani homered in the next game, but the Dodgers lost 5–2. Kershaw pitched six shutout innings in the series finale, Ohtani homered again and the Dodgers won 2–1.

They returned home on August 19 to play the Seattle Mariners with Stone striking out a career high 10 batters while only allowing two hits in seven scoreless innings. Gavin Lux and Max Muncy both homered in a three-run seventh, which accounted for all the runs in a 3–0 win. The Mariners jumped out to a three run lead early in the next game, but the Dodgers came back with Lux and Muncy again homering and won the game, 6–3, thanks to a pinch hit three-run homer by Jason Heyward in the eighth inning. The Dodgers completed the sweep of the Mariners with a 8–4 win. Muncy doubled twice and drove in three runs. On August 23, Bobby Miller struck out nine batters in six innings and the Dodgers won 7–3 against the Tampa Bay Rays on a walk-off grand slam home run by Ohtani, who became the fastest player in MLB history to reach the 40–40 club. He accomplished the feat in his 126th game, passing the old mark (set by Alfonso Soriano in 2006) by 21 games. In the next game, the Dodgers quickly fell behind 4–0 in the first inning but came back to take the lead with home runs by Ohtani, Teoscar Hernández and Miguel Rojas. However, the Rays tied the game on a Junior Caminero home run in the ninth and scored the winning run on José Caballero homer in the 10th. The final score was 9–8. The Dodgers won the series finale, 3–1, after Betts hit a two-run home run in the eighth inning. Stone struck out seven while only allowing one run in seven innings. The Baltimore Orioles came to town for a three-game series next, with the Orioles taking game one, 3–2, on a two-run home run by Ramón Urías in the fifth. Ohtani and Teoscar Hernández homered in the next game, a 6–4 Dodgers win. The Dodgers recorded 14 hits in the next game, as they won 6–3.

At the end of August, the Dodgers began a road trip to Chase Field for a series against the Arizona Diamondbacks. The Dodgers hit three home runs to two from the Diamondbacks in a 10–9 win in the opener. In the following game, Ohtani, Betts and Freddie Freeman led off the game with back-to back-to back home runs, the first time that had been done in franchise history. Tommy Edman's two run single in the ninth brought in the winning margin in the 8–6 win.

=== September ===
The Dodgers started September by being blown out by the Diamondbacks, 14–3. Justin Wrobleski allowed eight runs in the second inning and 10 overall, tying an LA Dodger record for most earned runs allowed in a single game. In the series finale, Freddie Freeman homered twice, Teoscar Hernández had five hits and the Dodgers took the game, 11–6. Next up was a two-game series against the Los Angeles Angels at Angel Stadium. Mookie Betts hit a three-run home run in the 10th inning as the Dodgers won 6–2. In the next game, Bobby Miller struggled allowing five runs in the first inning as the Dodgers were blown out 10–1.

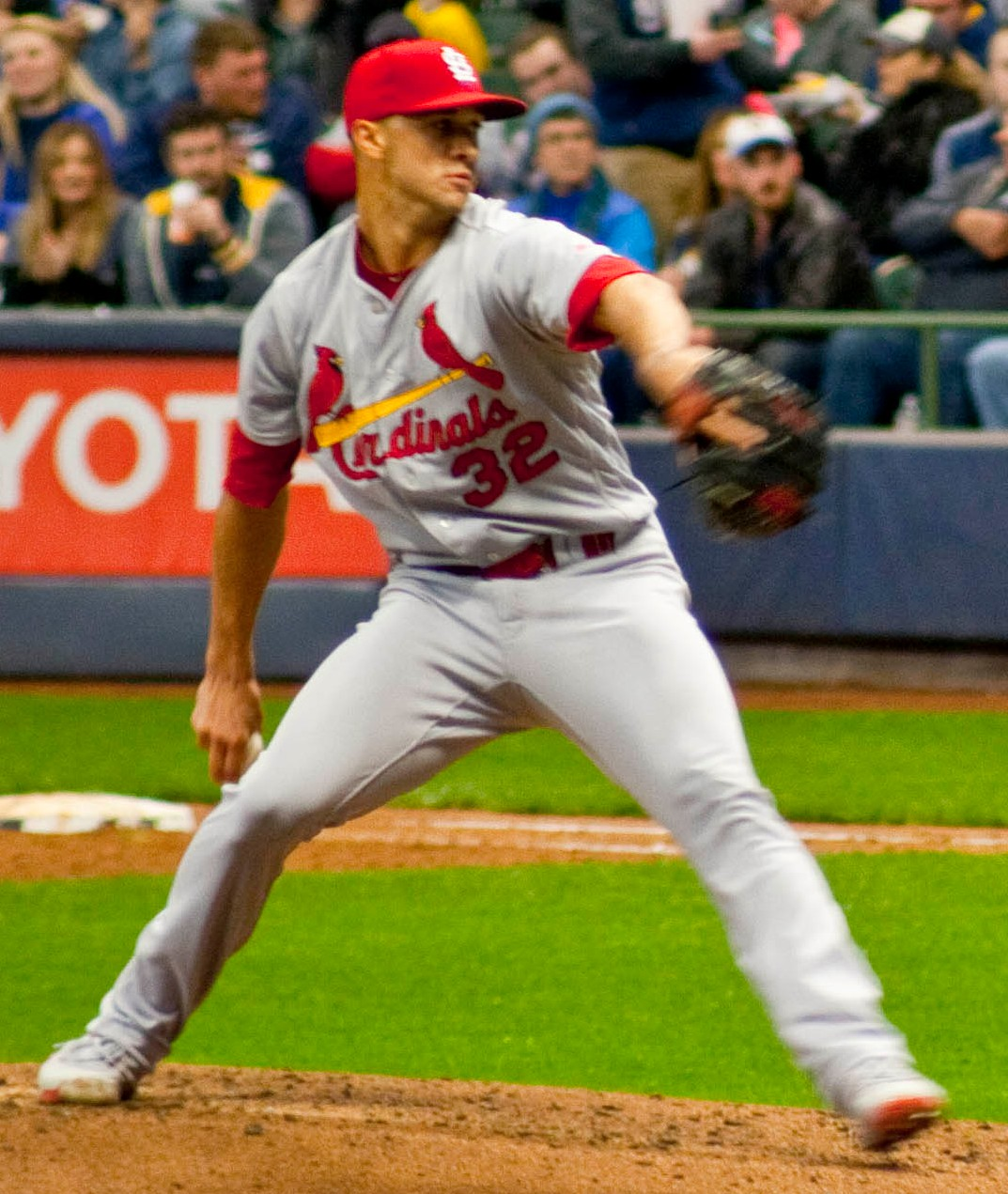
Jack Flaherty pitched 7 1/3 scoreless innings against the Guardians on September 8

Back home for the weekend series with the Cleveland Guardians on September 6, the Dodgers lost 3–1. The next day, the Dodgers scored six runs in the first inning, en route to a 7–2 win. Andy Pages and Betts homered. Jack Flaherty struck out six in 7 1/3 scoreless innings and Shohei Ohtani and Max Muncy homered as the Dodgers wrapped up the series with a 4–0 shutout win. The Chicago Cubs demolished the Dodgers, 10–4, the next day, with former Dodgers Cody Bellinger and Michael Busch homering. In the next game, Yoshinobu Yamamoto returned, after missing close to three months with a shoulder injury, and struck out eight in four innings. Tommy Edman hit two home runs in the game, and Muncy hit one of himself to give the Dodgers a 3–1 lead after five. However, three costly errors in the eighth inning led to five runs by the Cubs who won the game, 6–3. In the series finale, the Dodgers scored five runs in the first inning, hitting four homeruns, including three in a row from Will Smith, Edman and Muncy. However, Miller again struggled allowing six runs in 4 1/3 innings as the Cubs came back to tie the game at seven. Edman's second homer of the game, in the eighth inning, gave the Dodgers a 10–8 victory.

The next road trip took the Dodgers to Truist Park for a four-game series against the Atlanta Braves. Landon Knack allowed five runs on seven hits and two walks in only two innings as the Braves took the opener, 6–2. The Braves blew out the Dodgers, 10–1, in the second game. In the third game, the Dodgers scored seven runs in the ninth inning to break open a tie game. Teoscar Hernández, Edman and Muncy homered back-to-back-to-back in that inning. The series wrapped up with a 9–0 shutout by the Dodgers, who scored six runs in the seventh inning (with a three-run homer by Freeman the big blow) to pull away. Miller only lasted two innings in his next start, in the opener against the Miami Marlins at LoanDepot Park, allowing four runs. Ohtani hit his 48th home run but the Dodgers lost 11–9. Knack bounced back in his next start, striking out seven in five scoreless innings and the Dodgers hit three homers in a 8–4 win. On September 19, Ohtani had six hits in six at-bats, with two doubles, three home runs, 10 RBI and two stolen bases in the Dodgers 20–4 rout of the Marlins. In the process he became the first player in Major League Baseball history to hit 50 home runs and steal 50 bases in a single season. He also set new Dodgers franchise records for home runs in a season, passing Shawn Green (49 in 2001) and most RBI in a game, passing James Loney (2006) and Gil Hodges (1950) who both had nine. The Dodgers clinched their 12th consecutive playoff appearance with the win.

The Dodgers returned home for the last homestand of the regular season, beginning with the Colorado Rockies. Ohtani had three more hits, including another home run, in the Dodgers 6–4 win. However, they lost the next game, 6–4. The Rockies jumped out to an early lead in the series finale as well but the Dodgers fought back, with back-to-back home runs by Ohtani and Betts in the ninth giving them a 6–5 walk-off win. They finished off the home schedule with a key three-game series with the San Diego Padres, who were only three games back in the division race and they dropped the opener, 4–2, when Miguel Rojas hit into a game ending triple play. They won the following game, 4–3, with Ohtani twice delivery go ahead hits. On September 26, Walker Buehler allowed only one run in five innings, and the Dodgers scored five runs in the fifth inning, but they trailed 2–0 after six. Will Smith tied the game in the seventh with a two-run home run an then Ohtani drove in the go-ahead run four-batters later, putting them ahead for a 7–2 win, which clinched their 11th National League West championship in 12 seasons.

The Dodgers ended the regular season with a three-game roadtrip to Coors Field to play the Rockies. Ohtani had four more hits, including a homerun and double, in a 11–4 win. The following day, they secured the best record in MLB and home field advantage throughout the postseason when the Philadelphia Phillies lost and they blew out the Rockies again, 13–2. The Dodgers concluded the regular season with a 2–1 victory over the Rockies. A Chris Taylor homerun tied the game in the eighth and the Dodgers took the lead when Seth Halvorsen balked in Austin Barnes later that inning.

== Postseason ==
=== Game log ===
2024 Postseason Game Log: 11–5 (Home: 6–2; Away: 5–3)
National League Division Series: 3–2 (Home: 2–1; Away: 1–1)

#	Date	Opponent	Score	Win	Loss	Save	Attendance	Record
1	October 5	Padres	W 7–5	Brasier (1–0)	Morejón (0–1)	Treinen (1)	53,028	1–0
2	October 6	Padres	L 2–10	Darvish (1–0)	Flaherty (0–1)	—	54,119	1–1
3	October 8	@ Padres	L 5–6	King (1–0)	Buehler (0–1)	Suárez (1)	47,744	1–2
4	October 9	@ Padres	W 8–0	Phillips (1–0)	Cease (0–1)	—	47,773	2–2
5	October 11	Padres	W 2–0	Yamamoto (1–0)	Darvish (1–1)	Treinen (2)	53,183	3–2

National League Championship Series: 4–2 (Home: 2–1; Away: 2–1)

#	Date	Opponent	Score	Win	Loss	Save	Attendance	Record
1	October 13	Mets	W 9–0	Flaherty (1–1)	Senga (0–1)	—	53,503	1–0
2	October 14	Mets	L 3–7	Manaea (2–0)	Brasier (1–1)	Díaz (2)	52,926	1–1
3	October 16	@ Mets	W 8–0	Kopech (1–0)	Severino (1–1)	—	43,883	2–1
4	October 17	@ Mets	W 10–2	Phillips (2–0)	Quintana (0–1)	—	43,882	3–1
5	October 18	@ Mets	L 6–12	Stanek (1–0)	Flaherty (1–2)	—	43,841	3–2
6	October 20	Mets	W 10–5	Casparius (1–0)	Manaea (2–1)	Treinen (3)	52,674	4–2

World Series: 4–1 (Home: 2–0; Away: 2–1)

#	Date	Opponent	Score	Win	Loss	Save	Attendance	Record
1	October 25	Yankees	W 6–3 (10)	Treinen (1–0)	Cousins (0–1)	—	52,394	1–0
2	October 26	Yankees	W 4–2	Yamamoto (2–0)	Rodón (1–2)	Vesia (1)	52,725	2–0
3	October 28	@ Yankees	W 4–2	Buehler (1–1)	Schmidt (0–1)	—	49,368	3–0
4	October 29	@ Yankees	L 4–11	Holmes (3–1)	Hudson (0–1)	—	49,354	3–1
5	October 30	@ Yankees	W 7–6	Treinen (2–0)	Kahnle (1–1)	Buehler (1)	49,263	4–1

=== Postseason rosters ===
Playoff rosters
National League Division Series

- Pitchers: 0 Jack Flaherty 18 Yoshinobu Yamamoto 21 Walker Buehler 29 Michael Grove (Games 1–2) 41 Daniel Hudson 43 Anthony Banda 45 Michael Kopech 49 Blake Treinen 51 Alex Vesia 57 Ryan Brasier 59 Evan Phillips 60 Edgardo Henriquez 78 Ben Casparius (Games 3–5) 96 Landon Knack
- Catchers: 15 Austin Barnes 16 Will Smith
- Infielders: 5 Freddie Freeman 8 Kiké Hernández 9 Gavin Lux 11 Miguel Rojas 13 Max Muncy
- Outfielders: 3 Chris Taylor 25 Tommy Edman 37 Teoscar Hernández 44 Andy Pages 50 Mookie Betts
- Designated hitters: 17 Shohei Ohtani

National League Championship Series

- Pitchers: 0 Jack Flaherty 18 Yoshinobu Yamamoto 21 Walker Buehler 40 Brent Honeywell Jr. 41 Daniel Hudson 43 Anthony Banda 45 Michael Kopech 49 Blake Treinen 57 Ryan Brasier 59 Evan Phillips 60 Edgardo Henriquez 78 Ben Casparius 96 Landon Knack
- Catchers: 15 Austin Barnes 16 Will Smith
- Infielders: 5 Freddie Freeman 8 Kiké Hernández 9 Gavin Lux 13 Max Muncy
- Outfielders: 3 Chris Taylor 25 Tommy Edman 37 Teoscar Hernández 44 Andy Pages 50 Mookie Betts 93 Kevin Kiermaier
- Designated hitters: 17 Shohei Ohtani

World Series

- Pitchers: 0 Jack Flaherty 18 Yoshinobu Yamamoto 21 Walker Buehler 40 Brent Honeywell Jr. 41 Daniel Hudson 43 Anthony Banda 45 Michael Kopech 48 Brusdar Graterol 49 Blake Treinen 51 Alex Vesia 57 Ryan Brasier 78 Ben Casparius 96 Landon Knack
- Catchers: 15 Austin Barnes 16 Will Smith
- Infielders: 5 Freddie Freeman 8 Kiké Hernández 9 Gavin Lux 11 Miguel Rojas 13 Max Muncy
- Outfielders: 3 Chris Taylor 25 Tommy Edman 37 Teoscar Hernández 44 Andy Pages 50 Mookie Betts
- Designated hitters: 17 Shohei Ohtani

=== National League Division Series ===
The Dodgers started the postseason by facing the San Diego Padres in the Division Series. This was the fifth straight year they played a NL West team in the NLDS and the third time in that stretch that the opponent was the Padres.

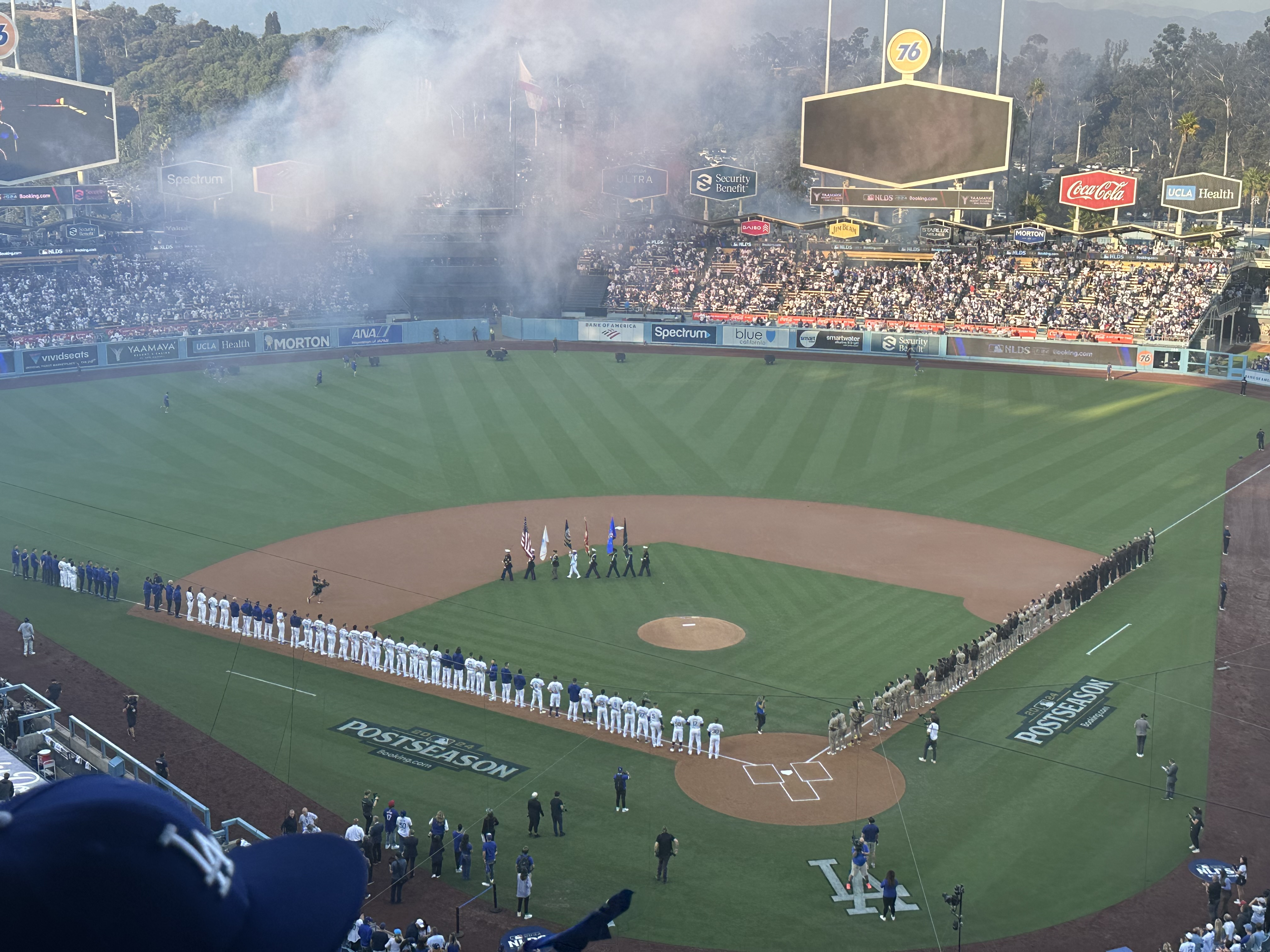
Player introductions prior to Game 1 of 2024 NLDS

In the first game, Yoshinobu Yamamoto started on the mound for the Dodgers, but only lasted three innings while allowing five runs, including a two-run home run by Manny Machado in the first inning. Shohei Ohtani had two hits in his first career post-season game, including a game-tying three run home run in the third inning. The Padres went back ahead the next inning on a two-run double by Xander Bogaerts but in the fourth, Tommy Edman scored on a wild pitch and then Teoscar Hernández drove in two runs on a single to put the Dodgers ahead for the first time. They added an insurance run when Will Smith scored on a force play in the fifth. The Dodgers bullpen pitched six shutout innings, including 1 2/3 innings by Blake Treinen to close out the game and the 7–5 win. Game 2 was a disaster for the Dodgers, as the Padres again jumped on them early with a solo homer by Fernando Tatís Jr. in the first and a two-run homer by David Peralta in the second off of Jack Flaherty. After Jurickson Profar robbed a Mookie Betts homer in the bottom of the first, the Dodgers offense could only manage three hits off Padres started Yu Darvish in seven innings. The Padres score one run in the sixth and six more in the eighths and ninth for a 10–2 rout. They hit six total home runs, including two by Tatís, setting a new franchise record and tying the MLB record.

The series switched to Petco Park for Game 3 and Betts homered in the top of the first to give the Dodgers their first lead of the game. It didn't last long as some sloppy defensive plays and another Tatís home run led the Padres to score six runs in the second inning off Walker Buehler. Teoscar Hernández hit a grand slam homer in the third inning of Michael King to cut the lead to one. Both bullpens pitched shutouts the rest of the game and the Padres took the lead in the series with a 6–5 win. Facing elimination in Game 4, the Dodgers jumped to an early lead with again Betts homering in the top of the first. They added two more runs on RBI singles from Ohtani and Betts in the second. Will Smith hit a two run homer in the third and Edman drove in another run on a sacrifice bunt in the seventh. Gavin Lux's two-run homer in the eighth finished the scoring. Without a starter, the Dodgers bullpen worked the entire game, with eight pitchers allowing seven hits and two walks while striking out eight in the largest post-season shutout in Dodgers' franchise history.

In Game 5, back at Dodger Stadium, Yoshinobu Yamamoto allowed only two hits and one walk in five scoreless innings and the Dodgers got two solo home runs, one each by Kiké Hernández and Teoscar Hernández. The Dodgers won the game 2–0 to win the series.

=== National League Championship Series ===
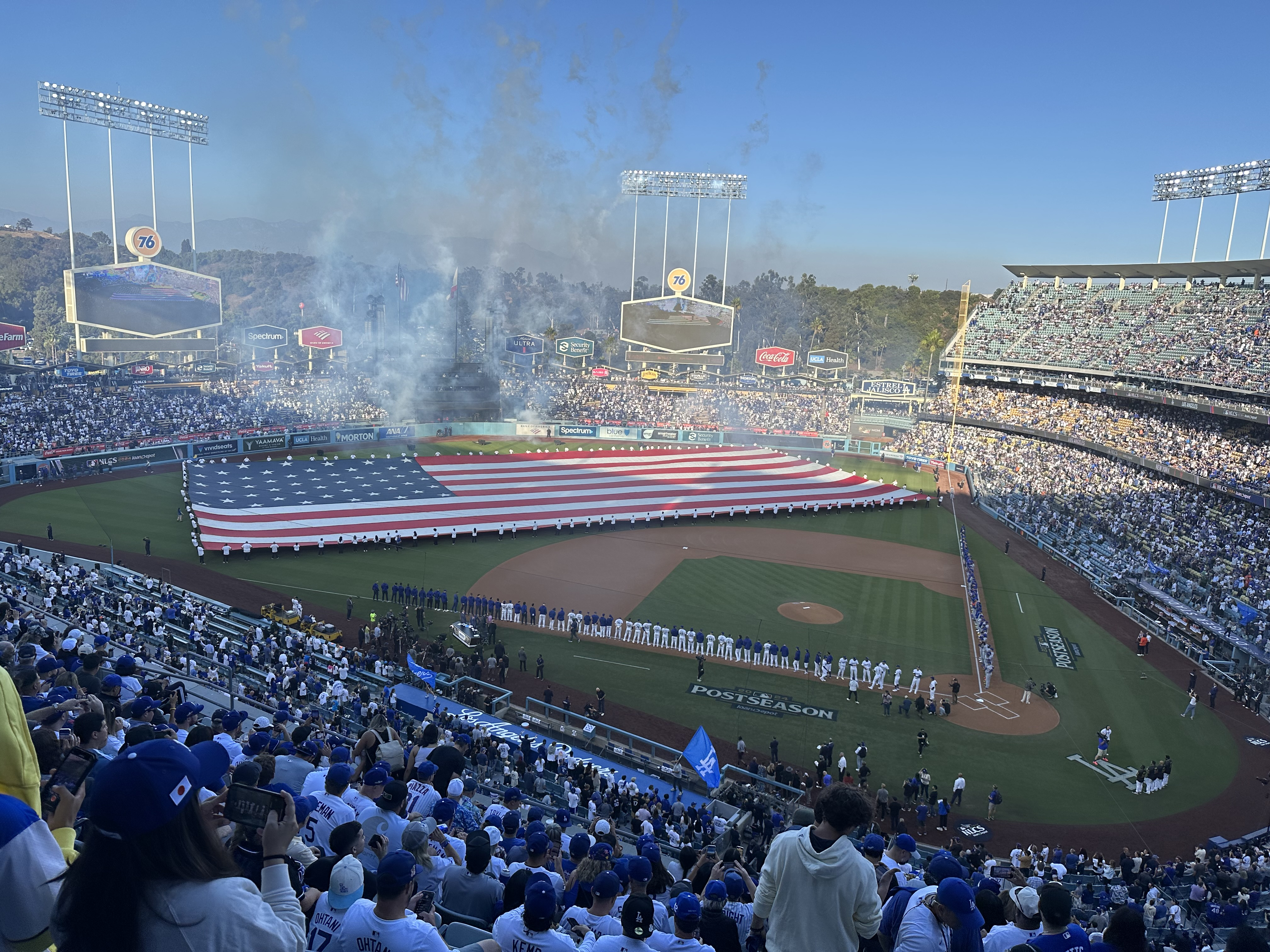
Pregame ceremonies for Game 1 of the 2024 NLCS at Dodger Stadium

The Dodgers faced the New York Mets in the Championship Series. In the first game, at Dodger Stadium, Jack Flaherty struck out six while allowing only two hits over seven scoreless innings while the Dodgers offense chased Mets starter Kodai Senga after just 1 1/3 innings and went on to rout the Mets, 9–0. This was the third consecutive shutout for the Dodgers, tying the all-time Major League record of 33 consecutive scoreless innings during the postseason. They became the third team ever to pitch three consecutive postseason shutouts, joining the 1966 Baltimore Orioles and the 1905 New York Giants. The streak ended when the first batter of the next game, Francisco Lindor, homered off opener Ryan Brasier. Mark Vientos hit a grand slam off of Landon Knack the next inning and the Mets took an early 6–0 lead. Sean Manaea kept the Dodgers offense in check, striking out seven and allowing only two earned runs in five innings. The Mets won 7–3 to even the series up.

The series moved to Citi Field for the next three games. In Game 3, Walker Buehler struck out six in four scoreless innings while the Dodgers offense scored eight runs on three home runs by Kiké Hernández, Shohei Ohtani and Max Muncy, who tied the Dodgers franchise playoff record with his 13th homerun (tying Justin Turner and Corey Seager). The Dodgers won 8–0 for their second shutout of the series and took a 2–1 series lead. Muncy reached base all five time he came to bat in the game, with three walks, a single and the homer. He was the fourth player in franchise history to accomplish that after Gil Hodges (Game 2 of the 1956 World Series), Manny Ramirez (Game 4 of the 2008 NLCS) and Will Smith (Game 3 of the 2020 NLDS). He reached base his first four at-bats in Game 4 as well, extending his on base streak to 12 straight appearances, a record for a single playoff series and tied with Reggie Jackson for overall playoff appearances. Yoshinobu Yamamoto allowed two runs, while striking out eight in 4 1/3 innings and the bullpen held the game the rest of the way, escaping bases loaded no out jam in the sixth inning. Mookie Betts had four hits, including a homer and a double, while Ohtani also homered in the Dodgers 10–2 win. In Game 5, Flaherty didn't have anything to start the game, surrendering a three-run home run by Pete Alonso in the first inning and then going on to give up five more runs in his three innings of work. Andy Pages hit two home runs for the Dodgers and Betts added one but the Mets teed off on Flaherty and Brent Honeywell Jr., who worked 4 2/3 innings out of the bullpen. The final score was 12–6 Mets.

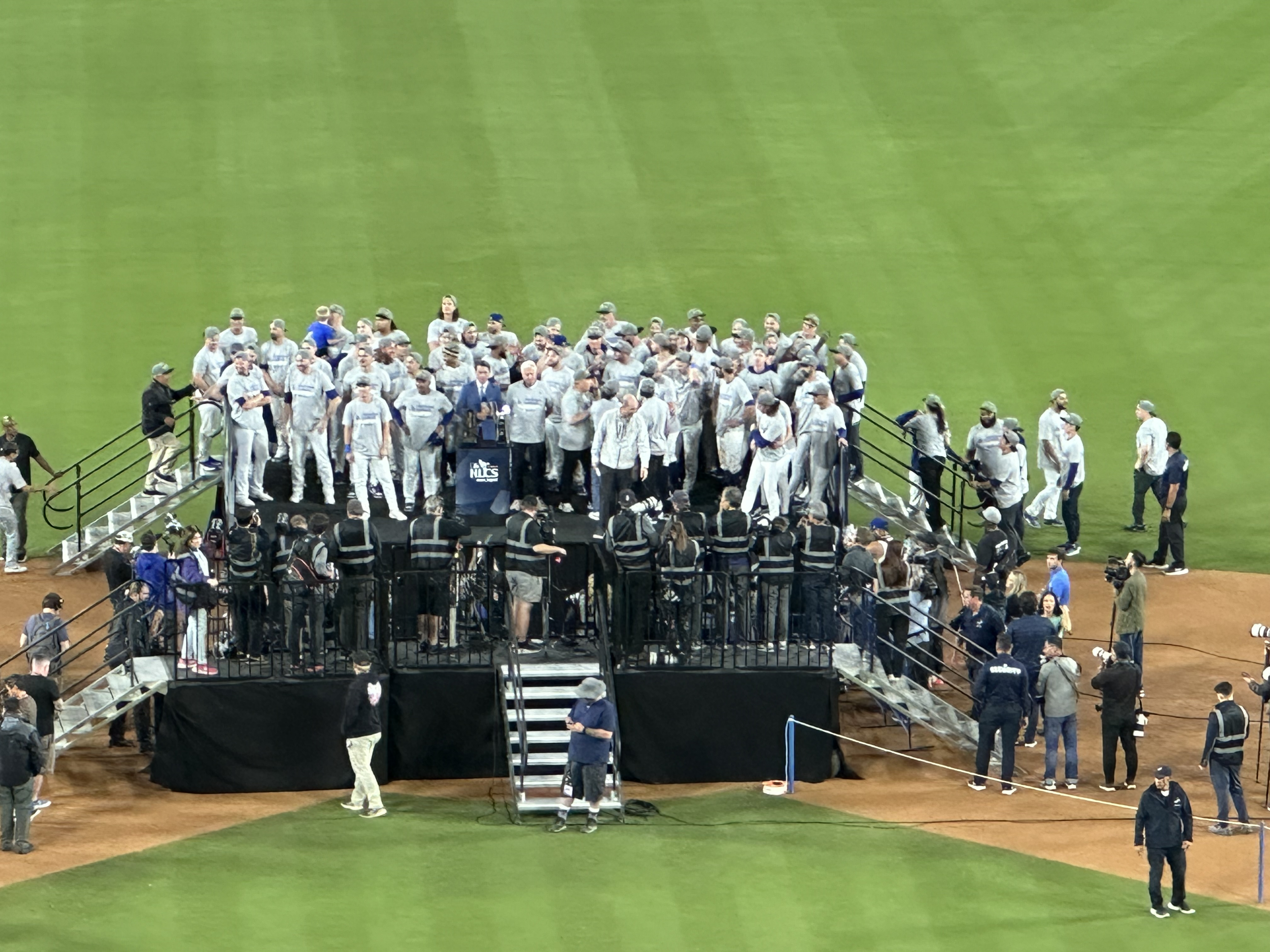
Trophy ceremony after Game 6 of the 2024 NLCS

Back home for Game 6, the Dodgers went with a bullpen game against the Mets, using seven different relievers to get through the game. A two-run home run by Tommy Edman off of Manaea and another two-run homer by Will Smith off Phil Maton, both in the third inning staked the Dodgers to a 6–1 lead. Vientos hit a two-run homer in the fourth to cut the lead to three. After each team added solo runs, the Dodgers pulled away in the eighth with three more runs to win the National League pennant with a 10–5 victory. Blake Treinen pitched the last two innings for the save.

The 2024 NLCS had an average margin of victory of 6.7, the highest in MLB postseason history. The Dodgers scored 46 runs in the series, which was also a record, two more than the Atlanta Braves in the 1996 NLCS and San Francisco Giants in the 2002 World Series. It was only the third time in history that one team had outscored another in the NLCS by 20 or more runs, joining the 1996 Braves and 2017 Dodgers. The nine runs scored by Ohtani in the series set a new Dodgers postseason record, surpassing Corey Seager's 2020 NLCS mark by one and the Dodgers walked 42 times in the series, a major league record, surpassing the previous mark of 40 set by the St. Louis Cardinals in the 2011 World Series and Cleveland Indians in the 1997 World Series. Ohtani and Muncy each reached base 17 times in the series, setting a new franchise record, surpassing the previous mark of 15 set by Jim Gilliam (1955 World Series), Manny Ramírez (2008 NLCS), and Seager (2020 World Series).

=== World Series ===
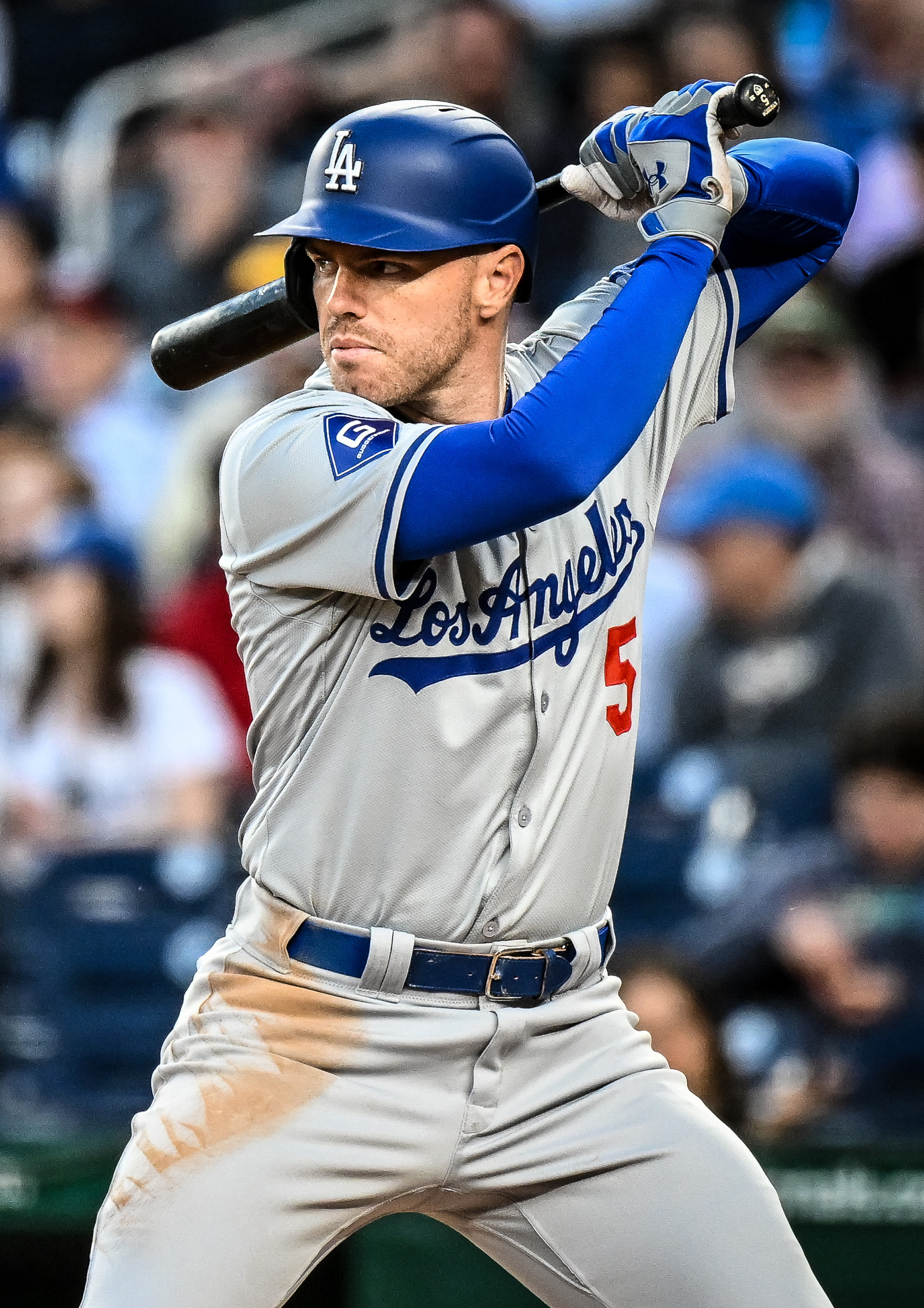
Freddie Freeman hit a walk-off grand slam in Game 1 and a home run in three subsequent games to break the record for the most consecutive World Series games with a home run

The Dodgers faced the New York Yankees in the World Series for the 12th time, and first since the 1981 World Series. In Game 1, at Dodger Stadium, Jack Flaherty allowed two runs (on a two-run homer by Giancarlo Stanton) in 5 1/3 innings while striking out six. Gerrit Cole was a bit better, allowing only one run (on a Will Smith sacrifice fly), in six innings. The Dodgers tied the game in the eighth on a sacrifice fly by Mookie Betts and then in the 10th, Jazz Chisholm Jr. singled, stole two bases, and scored on a force out by Anthony Volpe. Freddie Freeman hit a walk-off grand slam off Nestor Cortés Jr. in the bottom of the inning to give the Dodgers a 6–3 win. It was the first walk-off grand slam in World Series history and only the third walk-off homer in Game 1, joining Kirk Gibson (1988) and Adolis García (2023). Yoshinobu Yamamoto started Game 2 for the Dodgers and only one run on one hit (a Juan Soto home run) in 6 1/3 innings. Tommy Edman homered for the Dodgers in the second and then Teoscar Hernández and Freeman homered back-to-back in the third inning. The Yankees got a run back in the ninth and loaded the bases against Blake Treinen before Alex Vesia retired pinch-hitter Jose Trevino on a fly out to preserve the Dodgers 4–2 win.

The series moved to Yankee Stadium for Game 3 and Walker Buehler responded by pitching five scoreless innings for the Dodgers. Freeman homered in the second inning, the third straight game in the series and fifth straight overall in the World Series for him, continuing from the 2021 World Series, tying George Springer for the MLB record. The Dodgers added two more runs as the bullpen continued to pitch a shutout, which was broken when Alex Verdugo hit a two-run homerun in the ninth. The following batter, Gleyber Torres, ground out to end the game with a 4–2 win and a 3–0 series lead. Freeman hit another two-run home run in the first inning of Game 4, to break the record. The Dodgers went with a bullpen game and the Yankees got one run in the second and then four more in the third on a grand slam by Volpe. The Dodgers got two back in the fifth on a solo homer by Smith and a groundout by Freeman. Austin Wells homered for the Yankees in the sixth and they added another five in the eighth (three of them on a home run by Torres) to make the final score 11–4 Yankees, preventing the sweep and continuing the series. In Game 5, Flaherty struggled from the start, pitching only 1 1/3 innings, while allowing four runs on four hits and two first inning home runs (by Aaron Judge and Chisholm). The Yankees added another run on a solo homer by Stanton in the third to take a 5–0 lead. The Dodgers came back with five unearned runs in the fifth, thanks to sloppy Yankees defense and key hits by Betts and Freeman. The Yankees went back ahead on a sacrifice fly by Stanton in the sixth but the Dodgers scored two in the eighth on two sacrifice flys by Gavin Lux and Betts to take the lead. After 2 1/3 innings by Treinen in relief, Buehler came in on one day rest to pitch a scoreless ninth and the Dodgers won the game, 7–6, and took the series. Freeman won the World Series Most Valuable Player award with a record-tying (Bobby Richardson (1960)) 12 RBI in the series.

== Roster ==
2024 Los Angeles Dodgers
Roster
Pitchers: 43 Anthony Banda; 57 Ryan Brasier; 75 Connor Brogdon; 21 Walker Buehler; 78 Ben Casparius; 70,74 Nabil Crismatt; 45 J. P. Feyereisen; 0 Jack Flaherty; 31 Tyler Glasnow; 48 Brusdar Graterol; 29,78 Michael Grove; 60 Edgardo Henriquez; 52 Elieser Hernández; 40 Brent Honeywell Jr.; 40,41 Daniel Hudson; 63 Kyle Hurt; 99 Joe Kelly; 22 Clayton Kershaw; 96 Landon Knack; 45 Michael Kopech; 94 Dinelson Lamet; 62 Zach Logue; 28 Bobby Miller; 65 James Paxton; 90 Michael Petersen; 59 Evan Phillips; 64 Nick Ramirez; 46 Yohan Ramírez; 77 River Ryan; 60 Eduardo Salazar; 35,71 Gavin Stone; 49 Blake Treinen; 61 Ricky Vanasco; 58 Gus Varland; 51 Alex Vesia; 70 Justin Wrobleski; 18 Yoshinobu Yamamoto; 56 Ryan Yarbrough	Catchers: 15 Austin Barnes; 67 Hunter Feduccia; 16 Will Smith; Infielders: 12 Nick Ahmed; 50 Mookie Betts; 6 Cavan Biggio; 5 Freddie Freeman; 8 Kiké Hernández; 9 Gavin Lux; 13 Max Muncy; 11 Miguel Rojas; 27 Amed Rosario	Outfielders: 25 Tommy Edman; 23 Jason Heyward; 37 Teoscar Hernández; 93 Kevin Kiermaier; 33 James Outman; 44,84 Andy Pages; 3 Chris Taylor; 6 Taylor Trammell; 27 Miguel Vargas; Other batters: 17 Shohei Ohtani	Manager: 30 Dave Roberts; Coaches: 54 Josh Bard (bullpen); 65 Aaron Bates (hitting); 91 Dino Ebel (third base); 88 Bob Geren (Major league field coordinator); 0,71 Danny Lehmann (bench); 86 Clayton McCullough (first base); 87 Connor McGuiness (assistant pitching); 92 Mark Prior (pitching); 72 Robert Van Scoyoc (hitting)

== Statistics ==
=== Batting ===
Stats in bold are the team leaders.

- Indicates league leader.

Note: G = Games played; AB = At bats; R = Runs; H = Hits; 2B = Doubles; 3B = Triples; HR = Home runs; RBI = Runs batted in; BB = Walks; SO = Strikeouts; SB = Stolen bases; AVG = Batting average; OBP = On-base percentage; SLG = Slugging percentage; OPS = On base + slugging

Player	G	AB	R	H	2B	3B	HR	RBI	BB	SO	SB	AVG	OBP	SLG	OPS
Shohei Ohtani	**159**	**636**	**134***	**197**	**38**	**7**	**54**	**130***	**81**	162	**59**	**.310**	**.390***	**.646***	**1.036***
Teoscar Hernández	154	589	84	160	32	2	33	99	53	**188**	12	.272	.339	.501	.840
Freddie Freeman	147	542	81	153	35	2	22	89	78	100	9	.282	.378	.476	.854
Will Smith	128	476	77	118	24	2	20	75	51	105	1	.248	.327	.433	.760
Mookie Betts	116	450	75	130	24	5	19	75	61	57	16	.289	.372	.491	.863
Gavin Lux	139	439	59	110	24	2	10	50	44	110	5	.251	.320	.383	.703
Andy Pages	116	403	65	100	23	1	13	46	29	108	1	.248	.305	.407	.712
Kiké Hernández	126	362	44	83	16	0	12	42	27	77	0	.229	.281	.373	.654
Miguel Rojas	103	307	41	87	21	0	6	36	23	34	8	.283	.337	.410	.747
Max Muncy	73	237	47	55	17	0	15	48	45	77	1	.232	.358	.494	.852
Chris Taylor	87	213	28	43	7	1	4	23	28	76	5	.202	.298	.300	.598
Jason Heyward	63	173	25	36	10	2	6	28	17	36	4	.208	.289	.393	.682
Austin Barnes	54	140	12	37	3	0	1	11	14	36	3	.264	.331	.307	.638
Tommy Edman	37	139	20	33	5	1	6	20	11	30	6	.237	.294	.417	.711
James Outman	53	136	12	20	4	0	4	11	16	55	2	.147	.256	.265	.521
Cavan Biggio	30	73	11	14	1	0	3	10	10	28	0	.192	.306	.329	.635
Miguel Vargas	30	71	11	17	4	0	3	9	8	16	1	.239	.313	.423	.736
Kevin Kiermaier	34	59	7	12	2	1	1	8	2	20	1	.203	.242	.322	.564
Nick Ahmed	17	48	6	11	0	0	1	2	1	14	1	.229	.245	.292	.537
Hunter Feduccia	5	12	2	4	0	0	0	1	2	2	0	.333	.429	.333	.762
Amed Rosario	5	11	1	3	1	0	0	2	1	2	1	.273	.333	.364	.697
Taylor Trammell	5	6	0	0	0	0	0	0	0	3	0	.000	.000	.000	.000
**Totals**	**162**	**5522**	**842**	**1423**	**291**	**26**	**233**	**815**	**602**	**1336**	**136**	**.258**	**.335**	**.446**	**.781**
**Rank in NL**	—	**3**	**2**	**3**	**1**	**6**	**1**	**2**	**1**	**5**	**6**	**3**	**2**	**1**	**1**

Source:Baseball Reference

=== Pitching ===
List does not include position players. Stats in bold are the team leaders.

Note: W = Wins; L = Losses; ERA = Earned run average; G = Games pitched; GS = Games started; SV = Saves; IP = Innings pitched; H = Hits allowed; R = Runs allowed; ER = Earned runs allowed; BB = Walks allowed; K = Strikeouts

Player	W	L	ERA	G	GS	SV	IP	H	R	ER	BB	K
Gavin Stone	**11**	5	3.53	25	**25**	0	**140.1**	**133**	**55**	**55**	37	116
Tyler Glasnow	9	**6**	3.49	22	22	0	134.0	92	53	52	35	**168**
Yoshinobu Yamamoto	7	2	3.00	18	18	0	90.0	78	32	30	22	105
James Paxton	8	2	4.43	18	18	0	89.1	82	45	44	**48**	64
Walker Buehler	1	**6**	5.38	16	16	0	75.1	89	52	45	28	64
Landon Knack	3	5	3.65	15	12	1	69.0	58	28	28	18	69
Ryan Yarbrough	4	2	3.74	32	0	1	67.1	52	29	28	25	39
Alex Vesia	4	4	1.76	**67**	0	5	66.1	33	19	13	33	87
Daniel Hudson	6	2	3.00	65	0	10	63.0	46	25	21	19	63
Bobby Miller	2	4	8.52	13	13	0	56.0	69	53	53	30	52
Jack Flaherty	6	2	3.58	10	10	0	55.1	52	23	22	19	61
Evan Phillips	5	1	3.62	61	0	**18**	54.2	48	30	22	19	61
Michael Grove	4	4	5.12	39	2	0	51.0	46	31	29	16	54
Anthony Banda	3	2	3.08	48	2	2	49.2	44	19	17	18	50
Blake Treinen	7	3	1.93	50	0	1	46.2	33	11	10	11	56
Justin Wrobleski	1	2	5.70	8	6	1	36.1	34	24	23	16	26
Brent Honeywell Jr.	1	1	2.62	18	1	1	34.1	29	11	10	9	17
Joe Kelly	1	1	4.78	35	0	0	32.0	31	19	17	16	35
Clayton Kershaw	2	2	4.50	7	7	0	30.0	36	19	15	9	24
Yohan Ramírez	0	4	5.52	27	0	1	29.1	32	21	18	11	27
Ryan Brasier	1	0	3.54	29	4	0	28.0	22	12	11	5	25
Michael Kopech	4	0	1.13	24	0	6	24.0	9	3	3	10	29
River Ryan	1	0	1.33	4	4	0	20.1	15	4	3	9	18
Michael Petersen	3	0	6.43	11	0	0	14.0	14	10	10	8	11
Nick Ramirez	0	0	6.08	8	0	0	13.1	18	11	9	7	5
J. P. Feyereisen	0	1	8.18	10	0	1	11.0	11	10	10	5	9
Elieser Hernández	0	1	8.38	5	1	0	9.2	9	9	9	3	6
Ben Casparius	2	0	2.16	3	0	0	8.1	9	3	2	4	12
Brusdar Graterol	0	0	2.45	7	0	0	7.1	3	2	2	2	7
Nabil Crismatt	1	1	2.57	5	0	0	7.0	7	3	2	0	6
Kyle Hurt	0	1	1.35	3	1	0	6.2	8	2	1	1	3
Gus Varland	0	0	3.00	7	0	0	6.0	7	3	2	4	3
Dinelson Lamet	0	0	2.08	3	0	1	4.1	2	2	1	2	3
Edgardo Henriquez	0	0	2.70	3	0	1	3.1	2	1	1	2	5
Zach Logue	0	0	18.00	2	0	0	2.0	6	4	4	0	4
Eduardo Salazar	0	0	0.00	1	0	0	2.0	3	1	0	2	3
Ricky Vanasco	0	0	13.50	2	0	0	2.0	3	3	3	0	1
Connor Brogdon	0	0	18.00	1	0	0	1.0	2	2	2	0	0
**Totals**	**98**	**64**	**3.90**	**162**	**162**	**50**	**1445.2**	**1273**	**686**	**626**	**501**	**1390**
**Rank in NL**	**1**	**15**	**6**	—	—	**3**	**2**	**2**	**6**	**6**	**10**	**6**

Note: No ERA qualifiers on team (1 IP per scheduled game, 162 IP).

Source:Baseball Reference

== Awards and honors ==
Recipient	Award	Date awarded	Ref.
Mookie Betts	National League Player of the Month Award (April)	April 3, 2024	
Shohei Ohtani	National League Player of the Week Award (April 29–May 5)	May 6, 2024	
Teoscar Hernández	National League Player of the Week Award (June 3–June 9)	June 10, 2024	
Shohei Ohtani	National League Player of the Week Award (June 17–June 23)	June 24, 2024	
Shohei Ohtani	2024 Major League Baseball All-Star Game (Starter)	July 3, 2024	
Mookie Betts	2024 Major League Baseball All-Star Game	July 7, 2024	
Freddie Freeman	2024 Major League Baseball All-Star Game	July 7, 2024	
Tyler Glasnow	2024 Major League Baseball All-Star Game	July 7, 2024	
Teoscar Hernández	2024 Major League Baseball All-Star Game	July 7, 2024	
Will Smith	2024 Major League Baseball All-Star Game	July 7, 2024	
Teoscar Hernández	Home Run Derby Champion	July 15, 2024	
Gavin Lux	National League Player of the Week Award (July 15–July 21)	July 22, 2024	
Shohei Ohtani	National League Player of the Week Award (September 16-September 22)	September 23, 2024	
Miguel Rojas	Roy Campanella Award	September 25, 2024	
Shohei Ohtani	National League Player of the Week Award (September 23-September 29)	September 30, 2024	
Shohei Ohtani	National League Player of the Month Award (September)	October 1, 2024	
Tommy Edman	National League Championship Most Valuable Player	October 20, 2024	
Shohei Ohtani	Players Choice Award for National League Outstanding Player	October 26, 2024	
Freddie Freeman	World Series Most Valuable Player	October 30, 2024	
Mookie Betts	Silver Slugger Award (Utility)	November 12, 2024	
Teoscar Hernández	Silver Slugger Award (Outfield)	November 12, 2024	
Shohei Ohtani	Silver Slugger Award (Designated hitter)	November 12, 2024	
Los Angeles Dodgers	Silver Slugger Award (Team)	November 12, 2024	
Shohei Ohtani	Edgar Martínez Award	November 14, 2024	
Mookie Betts	All-MLB Team	November 14, 2024	
Shohei Ohtani	All-MLB Team	November 14, 2024	
Teoscar Hernández	All-MLB Team (second team)	November 14, 2024	
Shohei Ohtani	Hank Aaron Award	November 14, 2024	
Shohei Ohtani	National League Most Valuable Player Award	November 21, 2024	
Dave Roberts	Baseball America Manager of the Year	December 12, 2024	
Shohei Ohtani	Associated Press Male Athlete of the Year	December 24, 2024	

== Transactions ==
=== March ===
- On March 19, placed RHPs Walker Buehler (right elbow surgery), Brusdar Graterol (right shoulder inflammation), Emmet Sheehan (right forearm inflammation) and Blake Treinen (bruised lung) on the 15-day injured list. Recalled RHP Landon Knack from AAA Oklahoma City.
- On March 22, optioned RHPs J. P. Feyereisen, Landon Knack and Gus Varland to AAA Oklahoma City.
- On March 31, optioned RHP Kyle Hurt to AAA Oklahoma City, transferred RHP Emmet Sheehan from the 15-day injured list to the 60-day injured list, and purchased the contract of RHP Nabil Crismatt from AAA Oklahoma City.

=== April ===
- On April 1, purchased the contract of RHP Dinelson Lamet from AAA Oklahoma City and designated RHP Nabil Crismatt for assignment.
- On April 2, claimed OF Taylor Trammell off waivers from the Seattle Mariners and released LHP Matt Gage. Acquired LHP Nick Ramirez from the New York Yankees in exchange for cash considerations and transferred RHP Brusdar Graterol from the 15-day injured list to the 60-day injured list.
- On April 3, placed OF Jason Heyward on the 10-day injured list with lower back tightness, activated OF Taylor Trammell and optioned LHP Nick Ramirez to AAA Oklahoma City.
- On April 6, designated RHP Dinelson Lamet for assignment, recalled RHP Gus Varland from AAA Oklahoma City. Acquired RHP Connor Brogdon from the Philadelphia Phillies in exchange for minor leaguer Benony Robles.
- On April 8, activated RHP Connor Brogdon and optioned RHP Gus Varland to AAA Oklahoma City.
- On April 13, placed RHPs Bobby Miller (shoulder inflammation) and Connor Brogdon (plantar fasciitis) on the 15-day disabled list and recalled RHP J. P. Feyereisen and LHP Nick Ramirez from AAA Oklahoma City.
- On April 15, recalled RHP Ricky Vanasco from AAA Oklahoma City and optioned RHP J. P. Feyereisen to AAA Oklahoma City.
- On April 16, optioned RHP Ricky Vanasco and LHP Nick Ramirez to AAA Oklahoma City, recalled RHP Kyle Hurt and OF Andy Pages from AAA Oklahoma City, purchased the contract of RHP Eduardo Salazar from AAA Oklahoma City and designated OF Taylor Trammell for assignment.
- On April 17, optioned RHP Eduardo Salazar to AAA Oklahoma City and recalled RHP Landon Knack from AAA Oklahoma City.
- On April 20, placed RHP Kyle Hurt on the 15-day injured list with right shoulder inflammation and recalled LHP Nick Ramirez from AAA Oklahoma City.
- On April 27, optioned LHP Nick Ramirez to AAA Oklahoma City, purchased the contract of RHP Nabil Crismatt from AAA Oklahoma City and transferred RHP Kyle Hurt from the 15-day injured list to the 60-day injured list.
- On April 29, placed RHP Ryan Brasier on the 15-day injured list with a right calf strain and recalled RHP Gus Varland from AAA Oklahoma City.

=== May ===
- On May 2, optioned RHP Landon Knack to AAA Oklahoma City and recalled RHP J. P. Feyereisen from AAA Oklahoma City.
- On May 5, placed RHP Evan Phillips on the 15-day injured list with a right hamstring strain and activated RHP Blake Treinen from the 15-day injured list.
- On May 6, placed RHP Joe Kelly on the 15-day injured list with right posterior shoulder strain and activated RHP Walker Buehler from the 15-day injured list.
- On May 15, recalled RHP Eduardo Salazar from AAA Oklahoma City, purchased the contract of RHP Elieser Hernández from AAA Oklahoma City, optioned RHP Gus Varland to AAA Oklahoma City and designated RHP Nabil Crismatt for assignment.
- On May 16, optioned RHP Eduardo Salazar to AAA Oklahoma City and recalled LHP Nick Ramirez from AAA Oklahoma City.
- On May 17, optioned OF James Outman and LHP Nick Ramirez to AAA Oklahoma City, recalled OF Miguel Vargas and RHP Ricky Vanasco from AAA Oklahoma City, activated OF Jason Heyward from the 10-day injured list and placed 3B Max Muncy on the 10-day injured list with a right oblique strain.
- On May 19, optioned RHPs J. P. Feyereisen and Ricky Vanasco to AAA Oklahoma City, recalled RHP Landon Knack from AAA Oklahoma City, purchased LHP Anthony Banda from AAA Oklahoma City and transferred RHP Connor Brogdon from the 15-day injured list to the 60-day injured list.
- On May 20, acquired RHP Yohan Ramírez from the New York Mets for cash considerations, optioned RHP Landon Knack to AAA Oklahoma City and designated RHP Eduardo Salazar for assignment.
- On May 28, added LHP Nick Ramirez as the 27-man for a doubleheader.
- On May 31, activated RHP Evan Phillips from the 15-day injured list and designated RHP Elieser Hernández for assignment.

=== June ===
- On June 12, acquired IF/OF Cavan Biggio and cash considerations from the Toronto Blue Jays in exchange for minor league pitcher Braydon Fisher. Optioned OF Miguel Vargas to AAA Oklahoma City.
- On June 14, acquired LHP José Hernández from the Pittsburgh Pirates for cash considerations and transferred RHP Ryan Brasier from the 15-day injured list to the 60-day injured list.
- On June 16, placed RHP Yoshinobu Yamamoto on the 15-day injured list with a strained rotator cuff and RHP Michael Grove on the 15-day injured list with a right intercostal strain, recalled RHP J. P. Feyereisen from AAA Oklahoma City, purchased the contract of RHP Michael Petersen from AAA Oklahoma City and transferred RHP Joe Kelly from the 15-day injured list to the 60-day injured list.
- On June 17, placed IF Mookie Betts on the 10–day injured list with a fractured left wrist and recalled OF Miguel Vargas from AAA Oklahoma City.
- On June 19, placed RHP Walker Buehler on the 15-day injured list with right hip inflammation and activated RHP Bobby Miller from the 15-day injured list.
- On June 21, recalled RHP Landon Knack from AAA Oklahoma City, optioned RHP J. P. Feyereisen to AAA Oklahoma City, activated RHP Kyle Hurt from the 60-day injured list and optioned him to AAA Oklahoma City, transferred IF Max Muncy from the 10-day injured list to the 60-day injured list.

=== July ===
- On July 3, purchased the contract of RHP Matt Gage from AAA Oklahoma City and optioned him to AAA Oklahoma City, outrighted RHP J. P. Feyereisen to AAA Oklahoma City.
- On July 4, recalled LHP Nick Ramirez from AAA Oklahoma City and optioned RHP Michael Peterson to AAA Oklahoma City.
- On July 5, optioned LHP Nick Ramirez to AAA Oklahoma City, placed OF Jason Heyward on the 10-day injured list with a left knee bone bruise and recalled RHP Gus Varland and OF James Outman from AAA Oklahoma City.
- On July 7, purchased LHP Justin Wrobleski from AAA Oklahoma City, optioned RHP Gus Varland to AAA Oklahoma City and traded RHP Matt Gage to the New York Mets in exchange for cash considerations.
- On July 9, placed RHP Tyler Glasnow on the 15-day injured list with lower back tightness and recalled RHP Michael Peterson from AAA Oklahoma City.
- On July 10, optioned RHP Bobby Miller to AAA Oklahoma City and recalled RHP Ricky Vanasco from AAA Oklahoma City.
- On July 13, claimed RHP Brent Honeywell Jr. off waivers from the Pittsburgh Pirates and transferred RHP Yoshinobu Yamamoto from the 15-day injured list to the 60-day injured list.
- On July 18, outrighted LHP José Hernández to the Arizona Complex League Dodgers.
- On July 19, activated RHP Joe Kelly from the 60-day injured list and optioned RHP Michael Peterson to AAA Oklahoma City.
- On July 21, activated OF Jason Heyward from the 10-day injured list and optioned OF James Outman to AAA Oklahoma City.
- On July 22, purchased the contract of RHP River Ryan from the Arizona Complex League Dodgers and designated LHP James Paxton for assignment.
- On July 24, signed free agent SS Nick Ahmed and added him to the active roster, placed IF Miguel Rojas on the 10-day injured list with right forearm tightness, designated RHP Ricky Vanasco for assignment, activated RHP Tyler Glasnow from the 15-day injured list and optioned RHP Landon Knack to AAA Oklahoma City.
- On July 25, activated LHP Clayton Kershaw from the 60-day injured list and designated RHP Yohan Ramírez for assignment. Placed IF/OF Chris Taylor on the 10-day injured list with a groin strain and recalled OF James Outman from AAA Oklahoma City.
- On July 27, placed 1B Freddie Freeman on the family emergency leave list and recalled C Hunter Feduccia from AAA Oklahoma City.
- On July 28, acquired RHP Michael Kopech from the Chicago White Sox and IF/OF Tommy Edman and minor leaguer Oliver Gonzalez from the St. Louis Cardinals in a three-team transaction that sent IF/OF Miguel Vargas and minor leaguers Alexander Albertus and Jeral Pérez to the White Sox.
- On July 29, acquired IF/OF Amed Rosario from the Tampa Bay Rays for minor leaguer Michael Flynn.
- On July 30, acquired RHP Jack Flaherty from the Detroit Tigers in exchange for minor leaguers Thayron Liranzo and Trey Sweeney, acquired OF Kevin Kiermaier from the Toronto Blue Jays in exchange for LHP Ryan Yarbrough, designated RHP Gus Varland and LHP Nick Ramirez for assignment.
- On July 31, activated RHP Jack Flaherty and optioned LHP Justin Wrobleski to AAA Oklahoma City.

=== August ===
- On August 2, activated OF Kevin Kiermaier and IF/OF Amed Rosario and optioned C Hunter Feduccia to AAA Oklahoma City.
- On August 5, activated 1B Freddie Freeman from the restricted list and designated IF Cavan Biggio for assignment. Placed RHP Blake Treinen on the 15-day injured list with left hip discomfort and activated RHP Brusdar Graterol from the 60-day injured list.
- On August 7, placed RHP Brusdar Graterol on the 15-day injured list with a right hamstring strain, activated RHP Michael Grove from the 15-day injured list, activated IF Miguel Rojas from the 10-day injured list and optioned OF James Outman to AAA Oklahoma City.
- On August 11, placed RHP River Ryan on the 15-day injured list with right forearm discomfort and recalled RHP Landon Knack from AAA Oklahoma City.
- On August 12, activated OF Mookie Betts from the 60-day injured list and designated IF/OF Amed Rosario for assignment.
- On August 14, activated RHP Walker Buehler from the 15-day injured list and optioned RHP Landon Knack to AAA Oklahoma City.
- On August 16, placed RHP Tyler Glasnow on the 15-day injured list with right elbow tendinitis and recalled LHP Justin Wrobleski from AAA Oklahoma City.
- On August 17, optioned RHP Michael Grove and LHP Justin Wrobleski to AAA Oklahoma City, recalled RHP Bobby Miller from AAA Oklahoma City and activated RHP Ryan Brasier from the 60-day injured list.
- On August 18, purchased the contract of RHP Ben Casparius from AAA Oklahoma City and designated RHP Brent Honeywell Jr. for assignment.
- On August 19, activated IF/OF Tommy Edman and IF Max Muncy from the 60-day injured list, recalled C Hunter Feduccia from AAA Oklahoma City, optioned OF Andy Pages to AAA Oklahoma City, designated IF Nick Ahmed for assignment, placed C Austin Barnes on the 10-day injured list with a fractured left big toe and transferred RHP River Ryan from the 15-day injured list to the 60-day injured list.
- On August 21, activated RHP Blake Treinen from the 15-day injured list and optioned RHP Ben Casparius to AAA Oklahoma City.
- On August 22, activated IF/OF Chris Taylor from the 10-day injured list and designated OF Jason Heyward for assignment.
- On August 29, activated C Austin Barnes from the 10-day injured list and optioned C Hunter Feduccia to AAA Oklahoma City.
- On August 31, placed LHP Clayton Kershaw on the 15-day injured list with left big toe inflammation and RHP Joe Kelly on the 15-day injured list with right shoulder inflammation, recalled RHP Ben Casparius from AAA Oklahoma City and purchased the contract of RHP Brent Honeywell Jr. from AAA Oklahoma City.

=== September ===
- On September 1, recalled LHP Justin Wrobleski, RHP Michael Grove and OF Andy Pages from AAA Oklahoma City and optioned RHP Ben Casparius to AAA Oklahoma City.
- On September 2, recalled RHP Michael Petersen from AAA Oklahoma City and optioned LHP Justin Wrobleski to AAA Oklahoma City.
- On September 6, placed RHP Gavin Stone on the 15-day injured list with right shoulder inflammation, recalled RHP Landon Knack and LHP Justin Wrobleski from AAA Oklahoma City and optioned RHP Michael Petersen to AAA Oklahoma City.
- On September 8, optioned LHP Justin Wrobleski to AAA Oklahoma City, purchased the contract of LHP Nick Ramirez from AAA Oklahoma City and designated RHP Michael Petersen for assignment.
- On September 10, activated RHP Yoshinobu Yamamoto from the 60-day injured list, designated LHP Nick Ramirez for assignment, placed LHP Anthony Banda on the 15-day injured list with a broken left hand, and activated RHP Brusdar Graterol from the 15-day injured list.
- On September 16, placed C Austin Barnes on the 10-day injured list with a fractured left big toe and recalled C Hunter Feduccia from AAA Oklahoma City.
- On September 18, optioned RHPs Bobby Miller and Michael Grove to AAA Oklahoma City, activated RHP Joe Kelly from the 15-day injured list, purchased the contract of LHP Zach Logue from AAA Oklahoma City and transferred RHP Tyler Glasnow from the 15-day injured list to the 60-day injured list.
- On September 20, recalled RHP Ben Casparius from AAA Oklahoma City and optioned LHP Zach Logue to AAA Oklahoma City.
- On September 24, optioned RHP Ben Casparius to AAA Oklahoma City, purchased the contract of RHP Edgardo Henriquez from AAA Oklahoma City, and transferred RHP Gavin Stone from the 15-day injured list to the 60-day injured list.
- On September 26, activated C Austin Barnes from the 10-day injured list and LHP Anthony Banda from the 15-day injured list, placed RHP Brusdar Graterol on the 15-day injured list with right shoulder inflammation and RHP Brent Honeywell Jr. on the 15-day injured list with a cracked fingernail on his right middle finger, optioned C Hunter Feduccia to AAA Oklahoma City and recalled RHP Ben Casparius from AAA Oklahoma City.
- On September 28, optioned RHP Ben Casparius to AAA Oklahoma City and recalled LHP Justin Wrobleski from AAA Oklahoma City.
- On September 29, optioned LHP Justin Wrobleski to AAA Oklahoma City, recalled OF James Outman from AAA Oklahoma City.

== Farm system ==
After the 2023 season, the Dodgers Triple-A franchise removed the Dodgers branding and changed their name to the Oklahoma City Baseball Club for one year while the organization determined on new branding for future seasons.

Level	Team	League	Manager	W	L	Position
AAA	Oklahoma City Baseball Club	Pacific Coast League (East Division)	Travis Barbary	79	71	2nd place
AA	Tulsa Drillers	Texas League (North Division)	Scott Hennessey	63	74	4th place
High A	Great Lakes Loons	Midwest League (East Division)	Jair Fernandez	69	61	3rd place
Low A	Rancho Cucamonga Quakes	California League (South Division)	John Shoemaker	65	65	3rd place
Rookie	ACL Dodgers	Arizona Complex League (West Division)	Juan Apodaca	40	20	1st place League champions
Foreign Rookie	DSL Dodgers Bautista	Dominican Summer League (Northwest Division)	Dunior Zerpa	29	26	3rd place
Foreign Rookie	DSL Dodgers Mega	Dominican Summer League (Northwest Division)	Leury Bonilla	25	29	6th place

=== Minor league awards ===
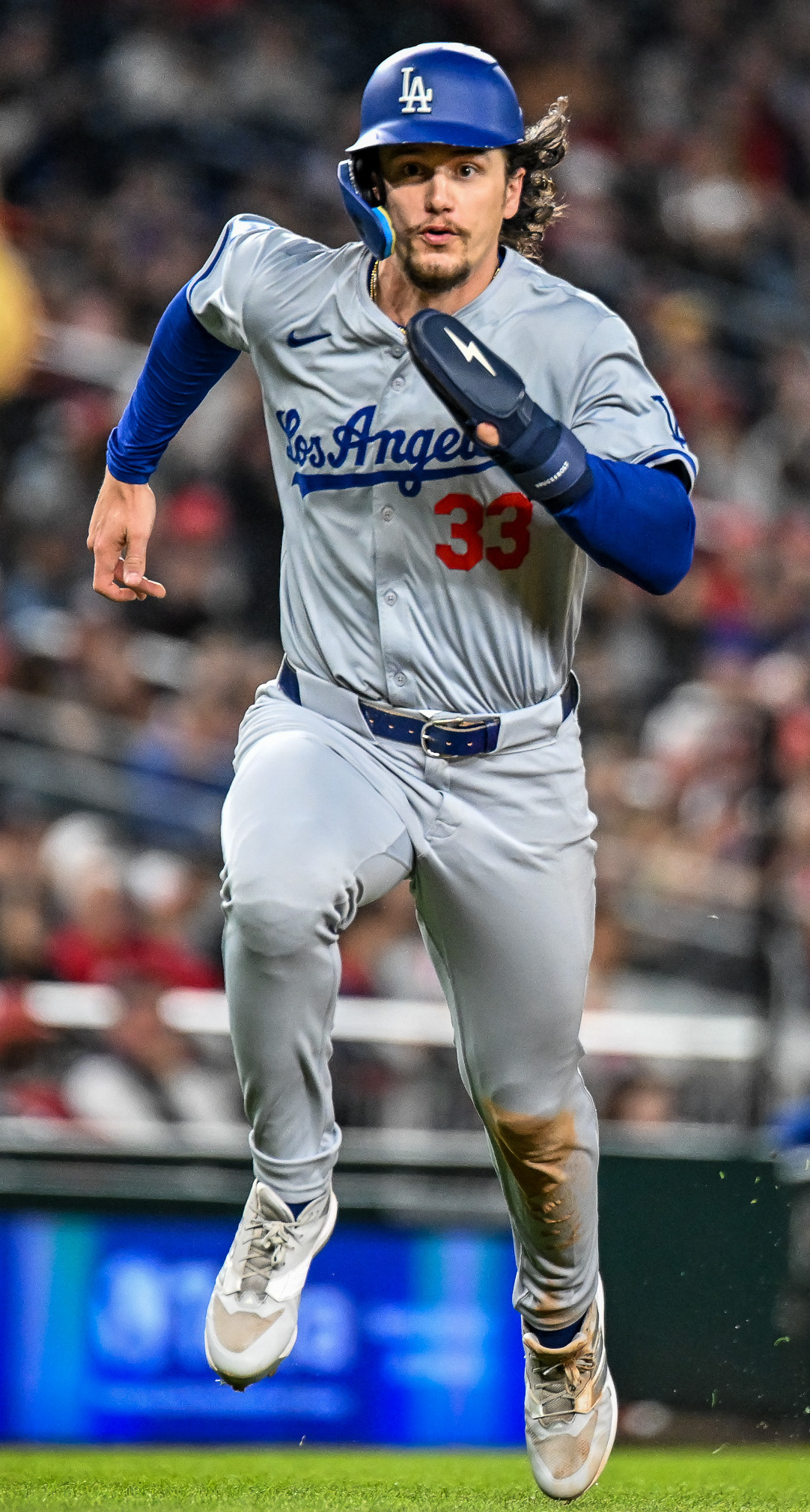
James Outman was selected to the Pacific Coast League All-Star Team

==== All-Star Futures Game ====
- Catcher Thayron Liranzo
- Second baseman Jeral Perez

==== Branch Rickey Awards ====
- Dodgers minor league player of the year: Dalton Rushing
- Dodgers minor league pitcher of the year: Jackson Ferris

==== Pacific Coast League ====
- All-Star: OF James Outman

==== Texas League ====
- All-Stars: SS Alex Freeland and DH Dalton Rushing

==== Midwest League ====
- All-Star: RHP Lucas Wepf

==== California League ====
- All-Star: C Carlos Rojas

==== Arizona Complex League ====
- Manager of the Year: Juan Apodaca

==== Dominican Summer League ====
- Player of the Year & Top Prospect: Emil Morales
- All-Stars: SS Emil Morales & OF Arnaldo Lantigua

== Major League Baseball draft ==
The 2024 Draft was held July 14–16, 2024. The Dodgers forfeited their second and fifth round picks by signing free agent Shohei Ohtani.

2024 draft picks

Round	Name	Position	School	Signed	Career span	Highest level
1	Kellon Lindsey	SS	Hardee High School	Yes	2025–present	A
3	Chase Harlan	3B	Central Bucks High School East	Yes	2025–present	A+
4	Jakob Wright	LHP	California Polytechnic State University	Yes	2025–present	A+
6	Brooks Auger	RHP	Mississippi State University	Yes	2025–present	A+
7	Elijah Hainline	SS	Oregon State University	Yes	2024–present	AAA
8	Brendan Tunink	OF	Newman Central Catholic High School	Yes	2025–present	A
9	Kole Myers	OF	Troy University	Yes	2025–present	AA
10	Seamus Barrett	RHP	Loyola Marymount University	Yes	2024–present	A+
11	Aidan Foeller	RHP	Southern Illinois University Carbondale	Yes	2024–present	AA
12	Cody Morse	SS	Weatherford College	Yes	2025–present	A+
13	Mike Villani	RHP	Long Beach State	Yes	2025–present	A
14	Will Gagnon	RHP	Reedley College	Yes	2026–present	A+
15	Erik Parker	SS	North Gwinnett High School	No		
16	Evan Shaw	LHP	University of Kansas	Yes	2024–present	AA
17	Jackson Nicklaus	SS	University of Oklahoma	Yes	2025–present	A+
18	Isaac Ayon	RHP	University of Oregon	Yes	2025–present	A+
19	Chase Williams	OF	Northwest Florida State College	No		
20	Hunter Elliott	LHP	University of Mississippi	No		
Ref.:

== See also ==
- 50–50 season
- List of Major League Baseball franchise postseason streaks
