= 2023 Los Angeles Dodgers season =

2023 Los Angeles Dodgers
- National League West champions
- League: National League
- Division: West
- Ballpark: Dodger Stadium
- City: Los Angeles, California
- Record: 100–62 (.617)
- Divisional place: 1st
- Owners: Guggenheim Baseball Management
- President: Stan Kasten
- President of baseball operations: Andrew Friedman
- General managers: Brandon Gomes
- Managers: Dave Roberts
- Television: Spectrum SportsNet LA (Joe Davis, Stephen Nelson or Tim Neverett, Orel Hershiser, Nomar Garciaparra, Eric Karros, Jessica Mendoza or Dontrelle Willis, and Kirsten Watson or David Vassegh)
- Radio: KLAC-AM; Los Angeles Dodgers Radio Network (Charley Steiner, Tim Neverett, Rick Monday); KTNQ (Pepe Yñiguez, Fernando Valenzuela, José Mota)

The 2023 Los Angeles Dodgers season was the 134th season for the Los Angeles Dodgers franchise in Major League Baseball, their 66th season in Los Angeles, California, and their 61st season playing their home games at Dodger Stadium. The Dodgers drew an average home attendance of 47,371 in 81 home games in the 2023 MLB season, the highest in the league.

On September 16, the Dodgers clinched a playoff berth for the 11th straight year, and captured their tenth National League West title during that span. This became the longest active playoff streak in major North American sports.

During the season, the Dodgers scored 900 runs in a season for the 6th time in franchise history, 4th since joining the National League in 1890, and 1st in Los Angeles (the Brooklyn Dodgers 1953 were the last to accomplish this feat). Additionally, with a record of 100-62, they were the first team in MLB history with four straight 100+ win seasons in non-shortened seasons. The Dodgers were swept by their division rival Arizona Diamondbacks in the National League Division Series in three games, the first time they had been swept in the postseason since the 2006 season.

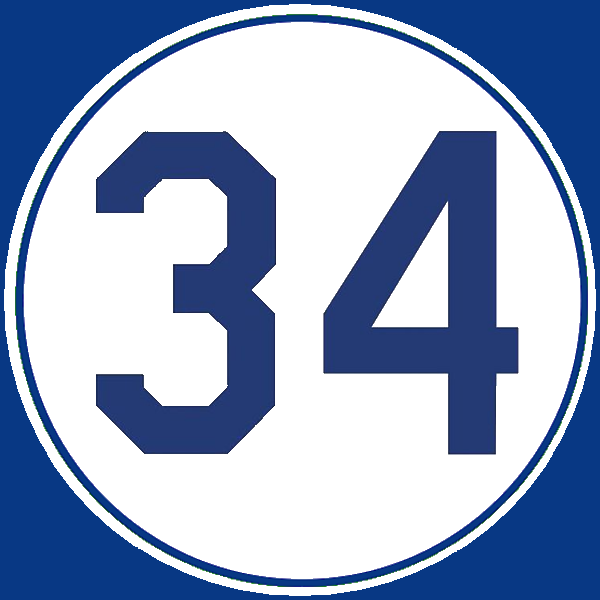
Fernando Valenzuela's number 34 was retired by the Los Angeles Dodgers in 2023.

== Offseason ==
=== Broadcasting team ===
Longtime Dodgers Spanish broadcaster Jaime Jarrín retired after the 2022 season. Jarrin had been their Spanish broadcaster for 64 years, the third-longest tenure an individual spent with a single team (only the late Vin Scully, at 67 years, and the late Tommy Lasorda, at 69 years, were with one team for longer than him - both also with the Dodgers). On January 20, the Dodgers announced that they had hired Stephen Nelson to join the English-language broadcast team on SportsNet LA.

=== Coaching staff ===
On November 28, hitting coach Brant Brown left the Dodgers for a new position as hitting coach for the Miami Marlins. On February 1, Danny Lehmann was promoted to the bench coach position, replacing Bob Geren who was named major league field coordinator.

=== Roster departures ===
The Dodgers started their offseason moves on October 22, 2022, by outrighting pitcher Beau Burrows to the minors, causing him to become a free agent. On November 6, the day after the 2022 World Series ended, ten Dodgers players officially became free agents: pitchers Tyler Anderson, Andrew Heaney, Tommy Kahnle, Clayton Kershaw, Craig Kimbrel, Chris Martin, David Price, shortstop Trea Turner and outfielders Joey Gallo and Kevin Pillar. On November 8, the Dodgers declined the 2023 club options on infielder Hanser Alberto and pitchers Jimmy Nelson and Danny Duffy, making them free agents. On November 10, they declined the 2023 option on longtime third baseman Justin Turner, making him a free agent. On November 18, the Dodgers non tendered outfielder Cody Bellinger and infielder Edwin Ríos. On January 6, the Dodgers designated pitcher Trevor Bauer, who had been suspended for the entire 2022 season, for assignment.

=== Roster additions ===
On November 8, the Dodgers acquired utility player Luke Williams via a waiver claim from the Miami Marlins, however he was non-tendered on November 18. On November 15, the Dodgers added four minor leaguers to the 40-man roster, catcher Diego Cartaya, infielder Michael Busch and outfielders Jonny DeLuca and Andy Pages. On November 18, they claimed pitcher Jake Reed off waivers from the Boston Red Sox, though he was later designated for assignment on December 29. On December 1, the Dodgers signed pitcher Shelby Miller to a one-year, $1.5 million, contract. Clayton Kershaw agreed to return to the Dodgers, signing a one-year $15 million contract on December 5. On December 14, the Dodgers traded minor league pitcher Jeff Belge to the Tampa Bay Rays in exchange for pitcher J. P. Feyereisen. On December 15, they acquired infielder Yonny Hernández from the Oakland Athletics for cash considerations. On December 16, they finalized a one-year, $13 million, contract with pitcher Noah Syndergaard. On December 29, they signed designated hitter J. D. Martinez to a one-year, $10 million, contract. On January 11, they acquired infielder Miguel Rojas from the Miami Marlins in exchange for Jacob Amaya. On February 16, the Dodgers added three more players to the roster on one-year deals, outfielder David Peralta and pitchers Alex Reyes and Jimmy Nelson.

Off-season 40-man roster moves

Departing Player	Date	Transaction	New Team	Arriving player	Old team	Date	Transaction
Beau Burrows	October 22	Outrighted	Atlanta Braves	Luke Williams	Miami Marlins	November 8	Waiver claim
Tyler Anderson	November 6	Free agent	Los Angeles Angels	Michael Busch	Oklahoma City Dodgers	November 15	Added to 40-man roster
Joey Gallo	November 6	Free agent	Minnesota Twins	Diego Cartaya	Great Lakes Loons	November 15	Added to 40-man roster
Andrew Heaney	November 6	Free agent	Texas Rangers	Jonny DeLuca	Tulsa Drillers	November 15	Added to 40-man roster
Tommy Kahnle	November 6	Free agent	New York Yankees	Andy Pages	Tulsa Drillers	November 15	Added to 40-man roster
Clayton Kershaw	November 6	Free agent	Los Angeles Dodgers	Jake Reed	Boston Red Sox	November 18	Waiver claim
Craig Kimbrel	November 6	Free agent	Philadelphia Phillies	Shelby Miller	San Francisco Giants	December 1	Free agent signing
Chris Martin	November 6	Free agent	Boston Red Sox	Clayton Kershaw	Los Angeles Dodgers	December 5	Free agent signing
Kevin Pillar	November 6	Free agent	Atlanta Braves	J. P. Feyereisen	Tampa Bay Rays	December 14	Trade
David Price	November 6	Free agent	N/A (Retired)	Yonny Hernández	Oakland Athletics	December 15	Trade
Trea Turner	November 6	Free agent	Philadelphia Phillies	Noah Syndergaard	Philadelphia Phillies	December 16	Free agent signing
Hanser Alberto	November 8	Option declined	Chicago White Sox	J. D. Martinez	Boston Red Sox	December 29	Free agent signing
Jimmy Nelson	November 8	Option declined	Los Angeles Dodgers	Miguel Rojas	Miami Marlins	January 11	Trade
Danny Duffy	November 8	Option declined	Texas Rangers	Jimmy Nelson	Los Angeles Dodgers	February 16	Free agent signing
Justin Turner	November 10	Option declined	Boston Red Sox	David Peralta	Tampa Bay Rays	February 16	Free agent signing
Cody Bellinger	November 18	Non-tendered	Chicago Cubs	Alex Reyes	St. Louis Cardinals	February 16	Free agent signing
Edwin Ríos	November 18	Non-tendered	Chicago Cubs				
Luke Williams	November 18	Non-tendered	Oklahoma City Dodgers				
Jake Reed	December 29	Designated for assignment	Oklahoma City Dodgers				
Trevor Bauer	January 6	Designated for assignment	Yokohama DeNA BayStars				
Jacob Amaya	January 11	Trade	Miami Marlins				

== Spring training ==
Spring Training non-roster invitees

Player	Position	2022 team(s)
Matt Andriese	Pitcher	Yomiuri Giants
Dylan Covey	Pitcher	Rakuten Monkeys
Tyler Cyr	Pitcher	Philadelphia Phillies / Oakland Athletics
Robbie Erlin	Pitcher	Los Angeles Dodgers
Bryan Hudson	Pitcher	Tennessee Smokies / Iowa Cubs
James Jones	Pitcher	Frisco RoughRiders / Round Rock Express
Landon Knack	Pitcher	Tulsa Drillers
Adam Kolarek	Pitcher	Oakland Athletics
Bobby Miller	Pitcher	Tulsa Drillers / Oklahoma City Dodgers
Nick Nastrini	Pitcher	Great Lakes Loons / Tulsa Drillers
Jake Reed	Pitcher	New York Mets / Los Angeles Dodgers / Baltimore Orioles
Nick Robertson	Pitcher	Tulsa Drillers / Oklahoma City Dodgers
Tayler Scott	Pitcher	San Diego Padres
Gavin Stone	Pitcher	Great Lakes Loons / Tulsa Drillers / Oklahoma City Dodgers
Wander Suero	Pitcher	Salt Lake Bees / Sultanes de Monterrey
Jordan Yamamoto	Pitcher	Binghamton Rumble Ponies / Syracuse Mets
Hunter Feduccia	Catcher	Tulsa Drillers / Oklahoma City Dodgers
David Freitas	Catcher	Scranton/Wilkes-Barre RailRiders
Patrick Mazeika	Catcher	New York Mets
Devin Mann	Infielder	Tulsa Drillers / Oklahoma City Dodgers
Luke Williams	Infielder	San Francisco Giants / Miami Marlins
Drew Avans	Outfielder	Oklahoma City Dodgers
Yusniel Díaz	Outfielder	Baltimore Orioles
Steven Duggar	Outfielder	San Francisco Giants / Texas Rangers / Los Angeles Angels
Jason Heyward	Outfielder	Chicago Cubs
Ryan Ward	Outfielder	Tulsa Drillers
Bradley Zimmer	Outfielder	Toronto Blue Jays / Philadelphia Phillies

Gavin Lux was expected to become the Dodgers starting shortstop for the 2023 season. However, on February 27 his knee buckled while running the bases in a Cactus League game and he was diagnosed with a torn anterior cruciate ligament in his knee, ending his season.

=== World Baseball Classic ===
13 members of the Dodgers organization were selected to national team rosters for the 2023 World Baseball Classic. Mookie Betts, Will Smith, Clayton Kershaw and third base coach Dino Ebel were part of the US Team; Freddie Freeman was chosen to play for the Canadian team; Julio Urías and Austin Barnes for Team Mexico; Miguel Rojas for Venezuela, Trayce Thompson for Great Britain, Adam Kolarek for Israel, and minor leaguers José Ramos (for Panama) and Liam Doolan (for Australia). Kershaw wound up not being able to participate.

== Regular season ==
=== National League West ===
NL West
Team	W	L	Pct.	GB	Home	Road
Los Angeles Dodgers	100	62	.617	—	53‍–‍28	47‍–‍34
Arizona Diamondbacks	84	78	.519	16	43‍–‍38	41‍–‍40
San Diego Padres	82	80	.506	18	44‍–‍37	38‍–‍43
San Francisco Giants	79	83	.488	21	45‍–‍36	34‍–‍47
Colorado Rockies	59	103	.364	41	37‍–‍44	22‍–‍59

=== National League Wild Card ===
Wild Card standings

Division leaders
Team	W	L	Pct.
Atlanta Braves	104	58	.642
Los Angeles Dodgers	100	62	.617
Milwaukee Brewers	92	70	.568

Wild Card teams (Top 3 teams qualify for postseason)
Team	W	L	Pct.	GB
Philadelphia Phillies	90	72	.556	+6
Miami Marlins	84	78	.519	—
Arizona Diamondbacks	84	78	.519	—
Chicago Cubs	83	79	.512	1
San Diego Padres	82	80	.506	2
Cincinnati Reds	82	80	.506	2
San Francisco Giants	79	83	.488	5
Pittsburgh Pirates	76	86	.469	8
New York Mets	75	87	.463	9
St. Louis Cardinals	71	91	.438	13
Washington Nationals	71	91	.438	13
Colorado Rockies	59	103	.364	25

=== Record vs. opponents ===
vs. NL Records

2023 National League record Source: MLB Standings Grid – 2023
Team	AZ	ATL	CHC	CIN	COL	LAD	MIA	MIL	NYM	PHI	PIT	SD	SF	STL	WSH	AL
Arizona	—	3–3	6–1	3–4	10–3	5–8	2–4	4–2	1–6	3–4	4–2	7–6	7–6	3–3	5–1	21–25
Atlanta	3–3	—	4–2	5–1	7–0	4–3	9–4	5–1	10–3	8–5	4–3	3–4	4–2	4–2	8–5	26–20
Chicago	1–6	2–4	—	6–7	4–2	3–4	2–4	6–7	3–3	1–5	10–3	4–3	5–1	8–5	3–4	25–21
Cincinnati	4–3	1–5	7–6	—	4–2	4–2	3–3	3–10	4–2	3–4	5–8	3–3	3–4	6–7	4–3	28–18
Colorado	3–10	0–7	2–4	2–4	—	3–10	5–2	4–2	4–2	2–5	2–4	4–9	4–9	3–3	3–4	18–28
Los Angeles	8–5	3–4	4–3	2–4	10–3	—	3–3	5–1	3–3	4–2	4–3	9–4	7–6	4–3	4–2	30–16
Miami	4–2	4–9	4–2	3–3	2–5	3–3	—	3–4	4–8	7–6	5–2	2–4	3–3	3–4	11–2	26–20
Milwaukee	2–4	1–5	7–6	10–3	2–4	1–5	4–3	—	6–1	4–2	8–5	6–1	2–5	8–5	3–3	28–18
New York	6–1	3–10	3–3	2–4	2–4	3–3	8–4	1–6	—	6–7	3–3	3–3	4–3	4–3	7–6	19–27
Philadelphia	4–3	5–8	5–1	4–3	5–2	2–4	6–7	2–4	7–6	—	3–3	5–2	2–4	5–1	7–6	28–18
Pittsburgh	2–4	3–4	3–10	8–5	4–2	3–4	2–5	5–8	3–3	3–3	—	5–1	2–4	9–4	5–2	19–27
San Diego	6–7	4–3	3–4	3–3	9–4	4–9	4–2	1–6	3–3	2–5	1–5	—	8–5	3–3	3–3	28–18
San Francisco	6–7	2–4	1–5	4–3	9–4	6–7	3–3	5–2	3–4	4–2	4–2	5–8	—	6–1	1–5	20–26
St. Louis	3–3	2–4	5–8	7–6	3–3	3–4	4–3	5–8	3–4	1–5	4–9	3–3	1–6	—	4–2	23–23
Washington	1–5	5–8	4–3	3–4	4–3	2–4	2–11	3–3	6–7	6–7	2–5	3–3	5–1	2–4	—	23–23

Updated with the results of all games through October 1, 2023.
vs. AL Records

2023 National League record vs. American League Source: MLB Standings
Team	BAL	BOS	CWS	CLE	DET	HOU	KC	LAA	MIN	NYY	OAK	SEA	TB	TEX	TOR
Arizona	1–2	1–2	2–1	2–1	3–0	0–3	2–1	2–1	0–3	1–2	2–1	1–2	1–2	3–1	0–3
Atlanta	2–1	1–3	1–2	2–1	2–1	0–3	3–0	2–1	3–0	3–0	1–2	2–1	2–1	2–1	0–3
Chicago	2–1	1–2	3–1	1–2	2–1	0–3	2–1	0–3	1–2	2–1	3–0	2–1	2–1	2–1	2–1
Cincinnati	2–1	2–1	1–2	2–2	2–1	3–0	3–0	3–0	1–2	0–3	2–1	2–1	1–2	3–0	1–2
Colorado	1–2	2–1	2–1	2–1	1–2	1–3	2–1	2–1	1–2	2–1	1–2	0–3	0–3	0–3	1–2
Los Angeles	2–1	2–1	2–1	2–1	2–1	2–1	1–2	4–0	2–1	1–2	3–0	3–0	1–2	2–1	1–2
Miami	0–3	3–0	2–1	2–1	2–1	1–2	3–0	3–0	2–1	2–1	3–0	1–2	1–3	0–3	1–2
Milwaukee	2–1	1–2	3–0	2–1	1–2	2–1	3–0	2–1	2–2	2–1	0–3	3–0	1–2	3–0	1–2
New York	0–3	1–2	2–1	3–0	0–3	1–2	0–3	1–2	1–2	2–2	3–0	2–1	2–1	1–2	0–3
Philadelphia	2–1	1–2	2–1	1–2	3–0	2–1	2–1	2–1	1–2	1–2	3–0	2–1	3–0	0–3	3–1
Pittsburgh	1–2	3–0	2–1	1–2	2–2	1–2	3–0	1–2	1–2	1–2	1–2	1–2	0–3	1–2	0–3
San Diego	2–1	1–2	3–0	2–1	2–1	1–2	1–2	3–0	1–2	1–2	3–0	1–3	2–1	3–0	2–1
San Francisco	1–2	2–1	2–1	2–1	0–3	2–1	1–2	1–2	2–1	1–2	2–2	1–2	1–2	1–2	1–2
St. Louis	2–1	3–0	2–1	1–2	1–2	1–2	2–2	0–3	1–2	2–1	2–1	1–2	2–1	1–2	2–1
Washington	0–4	2–1	2–1	1–2	2–1	1–2	2–1	1–2	2–1	2–1	3–0	2–1	0–3	2–1	1–2

Updated with the results of all games through October 1, 2023.

=== Game log ===
Legend
	Dodgers win
	Dodgers loss
	Postponement
	Clinched division
**Bold**	Dodgers team member

2023 Game Log: 100–62 (Home: 54–28; Away: 46–34)
March/April: 16–13 (Home: 9–6; Away: 7–7)

#	Date	Opponent	Score	Win	Loss	Save	Attendance	Record
1	March 30	Diamondbacks	**W** 8–2	**Urías** (1–0)	Gallen (0–1)	—	52,075	1–0
2	March 31	Diamondbacks	L 1–2	Jameson (1–0)	**Vesia** (0–1)	Chafin (1)	45,389	1–1
3	April 1	Diamondbacks	**W** 10–1	**Kershaw** (1–0)	Bumgarner (0–1)	**Jackson** (1)	48,886	2–1
4	April 2	Diamondbacks	L 1–2	Chafin (1–0)	**Graterol** (0–1)	McGough (1)	46,549	2–2
5	April 3	Rockies	**W** 13–4	**Almonte** (1–0)	Feltner (0–1)	—	49,792	3–2
6	April 4	Rockies	**W** 5–2	**Urías** (2–0)	Márquez (1–1)	**Phillips** (1)	52,290	4–2
7	April 6	@ Diamondbacks	**W** 5–2	**May** (1–0)	Kelly (0–1)	**Phillips** (2)	48,034	5–2
8	April 7	@ Diamondbacks	L 3–6	Jameson (2–0)	**Kershaw** (1–1)	—	30,249	5–3
9	April 8	@ Diamondbacks	L 8–12	Nelson (1–0)	**Syndergaard** (0–1)	—	26,881	5–4
10	April 9	@ Diamondbacks	L 6–11	Nelson (1–0)	**Grove** (0–1)	—	18,543	5–5
11	April 10	@ Giants	**W** 9–1	**Urías** (3–0)	Webb (0–3)	—	35,232	6–5
12	April 11	@ Giants	L 0–5	Alexander (1–0)	**May** (1–1)	—	30,768	6–6
13	April 12	@ Giants	**W** 10–5	**Kershaw** (2–1)	Rogers (0–1)	—	34,903	7–6
14	April 14	Cubs	L 2–8	Steele (2–0)	**Syndergaard** (0–2)	—	52,298	7–7
15	April 15	Cubs	**W** 2–1	**S. Miller** (1–0)	Fulmer (0–1)	—	52,375	8–7
16	April 16	Cubs	L 2–3	Smyly (1–1)	**Urías** (3–1)	Boxberger (1)	52,180	8–8
17	April 17	Mets	L 6–8	Peterson (1–2)	**Vesia** (0–2)	Ottavino (2)	50,313	8–9
18	April 18	Mets	**W** 5–0	**Kershaw** (3–1)	Megill (3–1)	—	46,884	9–9
19	April 19	Mets	L 3–5	Yacabonis (2–0)	**Syndergaard** (0–3)	Ottavino (3)	43,990	9–10
20	April 20	@ Cubs	**W** 6–2	**Ferguson** (1–0)	Fulmer (0–2)	—	32,817	10–10
21	April 21	@ Cubs	L 0–13	Smyly (2–1)	**Urías** (3–2)	—	30,381	10–11
22	April 22	@ Cubs	**W** 9–4	**May** (2–1)	Wesneski (1–1)	—	35,076	11–11
23	April 23	@ Cubs	**W** 7–3	**Kershaw** (4–1)	Stroman (2–2)	**Graterol** (1)	33,494	12–11
24	April 25	@ Pirates	**W** 8–7	**Almonte** (2–0)	Holderman (0–1)	**S. Miller** (1)	10,560	13–11
25	April 26	@ Pirates	L 1–8	Contreras (3–1)	**Bickford** (0–1)	—	12,152	13–12
26	April 27	@ Pirates	L 2–6	Keller (3–0)	**Urías** (3–3)	—	15,879	13–13
27	April 28	Cardinals	**W** 7–3	**May** (3–1)	Flaherty (2–3)	—	48,138	14–13
28	April 29	Cardinals	**W** 1–0	**Kershaw** (5–1)	Montgomery (2–4)	**Graterol** (2)	48,763	15–13
29	April 30	Cardinals	**W** 6–3	**Syndergaard** (1–3)	Thompson (1–2)	**Phillips** (3)	52,304	16–13

May: 18–10 (Home: 10–2; Away: 8–8)

#	Date	Opponent	Score	Win	Loss	Save	Attendance	Record
30	May 1	Phillies	**W** 13–4	**González** (1–0)	Walker (2–2)	—	42,137	17–13
31	May 2	Phillies	**W** 13–1	**Urías** (4–3)	Strahm (2–3)	—	42,780	18–13
32	May 3	Phillies	**W** 10–6	**Graterol** (1–1)	Kimbrel (1–1)	—	36,539	19–13
33	May 5	@ Padres	L 2–5	Darvish (2–2)	**Kershaw** (5–2)	Hader (11)	45,116	19–14
34	May 6	@ Padres	**W** 2–1	**May** (4–1)	Snell (1–5)	**Phillips** (4)	42,402	20–14
35	May 7	@ Padres	**W** 5–2 (10)	**Ferguson** (2–0)	Honeywell Jr. (2–1)	**Phillips** (5)	43,994	21–14
36	May 8	@ Brewers	L 3–9	Peralta (4–2)	**Gonsolin** (0–1)	—	22,847	21–15
37	May 9	@ Brewers	**W** 6–2	**Bruihl** (1–0)	Lauer (3–4)	**Phillips** (6)	23,874	22–15
38	May 10	@ Brewers	**W** 8–1	**Kershaw** (6–2)	Miley (3–2)	—	30,112	23–15
39	May 12	Padres	**W** 4–2	**Ferguson** (3–0)	Hill (1–1)	**Phillips** (7)	49,399	24–15
40	May 13	Padres	**W** 4–2	**Urías** (5–3)	Musgrove (1–1)	**Ferguson** (1)	51,334	25–15
41	May 14	Padres	**W** 4–0	**Gonsolin** (1–1)	Weathers (1–2)	—	46,201	26–15
42	May 15	Twins	**W** 9–8 (12)	**Bickford** (1–1)	López (1–1)	—	49,749	27–15
43	May 16	Twins	L 1–5	Ober (3–0)	**Kershaw** (6–3)	—	52,159	27–16
44	May 17	Twins	**W** 7–3	**Graterol** (2–1)	De León (0–1)	—	36,434	28–16
45	May 18	@ Cardinals	L 8–16	Wainwright (1–0)	**Urías** (5–4)	—	36,982	28–17
46	May 19	@ Cardinals	**W** 5–0	**Gonsolin** (2–1)	Matz (0–5)	—	44,774	29–17
47	May 20	@ Cardinals	L 5–6	Helsley (2–2)	**González** (1–1)	Gallegos (4)	45,177	29–18
48	May 21	@ Cardinals	L 5–10	VerHagen (3–0)	**Kershaw** (6–4)	—	44,721	29–19
49	May 22	@ Braves	**W** 8–6	**Phillips** (1–0)	Morton (5–4)	**Graterol** (3)	40,205	30–19
50	May 23	@ Braves	**W** 8–1	**B. Miller** (1–0)	Strider (4–2)	—	36,731	31–19
51	May 24	@ Braves	L 3–4	Iglesias (1–1)	**Bickford** (1–2)	—	37,838	31–20
52	May 26	@ Rays	L 3–9	Criswell (1–1)	**Syndergaard** (1–4)	—	19,715	31–21
53	May 27	@ Rays	**W** 6–5	**Almonte** (3–0)	Poche (3–1)	**Ferguson** (2)	23,443	32–21
54	May 28	@ Rays	L 10–11	Beeks (2–2)	**González** (1–2)	Adam (7)	21,043	32–22
55	May 29	Nationals	**W** 6–1	**B. Miller** (2–0)	Williams (2–3)	—	47,067	33–22
56	May 30	Nationals	**W** 9–3	**Gonsolin** (3–1)	Irvin (1–3)	—	46,571	34–22
57	May 31	Nationals	L 6–10	Finnegan (2–2)	**Graterol** (2–2)	Harvey (3)	36,552	34–23

June: 12–12 (Home: 5–7; Away: 7–5)

#	Date	Opponent	Score	Win	Loss	Save	Attendance	Record
58	June 2	Yankees	**W** 8–4	**Kershaw** (7–4)	Severino (0–1)	—	52,534	35–23
59	June 3	Yankees	L 3–6	Cole (7–0)	**Grove** (0–2)	Holmes (6)	52,975	35–24
60	June 4	Yankees	L 1–4	Holmes (4–2)	**Phillips** (1–1)	Peralta (4)	52,816	35–25
61	June 6	@ Reds	L 8–9	Salazar (1–0)	**Ferguson** (3–1)	—	22,602	35–26
62	June 7	@ Reds	L 6–8	Díaz (2–1)	**Phillips** (1–2)	—	19,003	35–27
63	June 8	@ Reds	**W** 6–0	**Kershaw** (8–4)	Ashcraft (3–5)	—	24,323	36–27
64	June 9	@ Phillies	L 4–5	Soto (2–4)	**Ferguson** (3–2)	—	42,364	36–28
65	June 10	@ Phillies	**W** 9–0	**B. Miller** (3–0)	Nola (5–5)	**Jackson** (2)	44,385	37–28
66	June 11	@ Phillies	L 3–7	Walker (6–3)	**Ferguson** (3–3)	—	44,287	37–29
67	June 13	White Sox	**W** 5–1	**Gonsolin** (4–1)	Lynn (4–7)	—	45,561	38–29
68	June 14	White Sox	L 4–8	López (2–4)	**Vesia** (0–3)	—	44,442	38–30
69	June 15	White Sox	**W** 5–4 (11)	**Ferguson** (4–3)	Crochet (0–1)	—	48,665	39–30
70	June 16	Giants	L 5–7 (11)	Rogers (3–2)	**Vesia** (0–4)	Junis (1)	49,074	39–31
71	June 17	Giants	L 0–15	Wood (2–1)	**B. Miller** (3–1)	Beck (2)	51,385	39–32
72	June 18	Giants	L 3–7	Webb (6–6)	**Gonsolin** (4–2)	Doval (19)	52,307	39–33
73	June 20	@ Angels	**W** 2–0	**Kershaw** (9–4)	Devenski (3–2)	**Phillips** (8)	44,703	40–33
74	June 21	@ Angels	**W** 2–0	**González** (2–2)	Ohtani (6–3)	**Phillips** (9)	44,760	41–33
75	June 23	Astros	**W** 3–2	**Sheehan** (1–0)	France (2–3)	**Graterol** (4)	49,795	42–33
76	June 24	Astros	**W** 8–7	**Bickford** (2–2)	Abreu (2–2)	**Phillips** (10)	49,218	43–33
77	June 25	Astros	L 5–6 (11)	Pressly (2–2)	**Almonte** (3–1)	Martinez (1)	47,273	43–34
78	June 27	@ Rockies	**W** 5–0	**Kershaw** (10–4)	Seabold (1–4)	**Phillips** (11)	38,738	44–34
79	June 28	@ Rockies	L 8–9	Bird (2–1)	**González** (2–3)	Lawrence (5)	37,267	44–35
80	June 29	@ Rockies	**W** 14–3	**Sheehan** (2–0)	Anderson (0–3)	—	36,667	45–35
81	June 30	@ Royals	**W** 9–3	**B. Miller** (4–1)	Marsh (0–1)	—	22,006	46–35

July: 13–10 (Home: 7–5; Away: 6–5)

#	Date	Opponent	Score	Win	Loss	Save	Attendance	Record
82	July 1	@ Royals	L 4–6	Lynch (2–3)	**Urías** (5–5)	Barlow (10)	21,004	46–36
83	July 2	@ Royals	L 1–9	Singer (5–7)	**Gonsolin** (4–3)	—	19,058	46–37
84	July 3	Pirates	**W** 5–2	**Ferguson** (5–3)	Keller (9–4)	**Phillips** (12)	49,652	47–37
85	July 4	Pirates	L 7–9	Bednar (3–0)	**Phillips** (1–3)	—	51,487	47–38
86	July 5	Pirates	**W** 6–4	**B. Miller** (5–1)	Contreras (3–7)	**D. Hudson** (1)	45,403	48–38
87	July 6	Pirates	**W** 5–2	**Urías** (6–5)	Oviedo (3–10)	**Vesia** (1)	42,036	49–38
88	July 7	Angels	**W** 11–4	**Gonsolin** (5–3)	Canning (6–4)	—	52,214	50–38
89	July 8	Angels	**W** 10–5	**Grove** (1–2)	Detmers (2–6)	—	53,057	51–38
–	July 11	93rd All-Star Game	National League vs. American League (T-Mobile Park, Seattle, Washington)					
90	July 14	@ Mets	**W** 6–0	**Urías** (7–5)	Verlander (3–5)	—	40,503	52–38
91	July 15	@ Mets	**W** 5–1	**Graterol** (3–2)	Ottavino (0–4)	—	38,225	53–38
92	July 16	@ Mets	L 1–2 (10)	Robertson (4–2)	**Robertson** (0–1)	—	34,805	53–39
93	July 17	@ Orioles	**W** 6–4	**Sheehan** (3–0)	Baker (3–3)	**Brasier** (2)	21,956	54–39
94	July 18	@ Orioles	**W** 10–3	**Grove** (2–2)	Wells (7–5)	—	22,775	55–39
95	July 19	@ Orioles	L 5–8	Coulombe (3–1)	**Urías** (7–6)	Bautista (26)	22,248	55–40
96	July 21	@ Rangers	**W** 11–5	**Brasier** (2–0)	Speas (0–1)	—	39,808	56–40
97	July 22	@ Rangers	**W** 16–3	**B. Miller** (6–1)	Dunning (8–3)	—	40,738	57–40
98	July 23	@ Rangers	L 4–8	Pérez (8–3)	**Sheehan** (3–1)	—	39,632	57–41
99	July 24	Blue Jays	L 3–6 (11)	Jackson (3–0)	**Bickford** (2–3)	Romano (28)	47,731	57–42
100	July 25	Blue Jays	**W** 8–7 (10)	**Graterol** (4–2)	White (0–1)	—	47,069	58–42
101	July 26	Blue Jays	L 1–8	Kikuchi (8–3)	**Gonsolin** (5–4)	—	46,667	58–43
102	July 28	Reds	L 5–6	Williamson (3–2)	**B. Miller** (6–2)	Díaz (31)	48,280	58–44
103	July 29	Reds	**W** 3–2	**Kelly** (2–5)	Weaver (2–3)	**Phillips** (13)	51,015	59–44
104	July 30	Reds	L 0–9	Ashcraft (6–7)	**Grove** (2–3)	—	45,936	59–45

August: 24–5 (Home: 15–2; Away: 9–3)

#	Date	Opponent	Score	Win	Loss	Save	Attendance	Record
105	August 1	Athletics	**W** 7–3	**Lynn** (7–9)	Waldichuk (2–7)	—	44,207	60–45
106	August 2	Athletics	**W** 10–1	**Gonsolin** (6–4)	Harris (2–6)	—	47,711	61–45
107	August 3	Athletics	**W** 8–2	**Urías** (8–6)	Sears (2–8)	**Sheehan** (1)	52,624	62–45
108	August 4	@ Padres	**W** 10–5	**Brasier** (3–0)	Suárez (1–1)	**Phillips** (14)	42,930	63–45
109	August 5	@ Padres	L 3–8	Martinez (5–4)	**Almonte** (3–2)	—	42,567	63–46
110	August 6	@ Padres	**W** 8–2	**Lynn** (8–9)	Hill (7–11)	—	43,306	64–46
111	August 7	@ Padres	**W** 13–7	**Gonsolin** (7–4)	Lugo (4–6)	—	44,455	65–46
112	August 8	@ Diamondbacks	**W** 5–4	**Urías** (9–6)	Pfaadt (0–6)	**Phillips** (15)	29,861	66–46
113	August 9	@ Diamondbacks	**W** 2–0	**Ferguson** (6–3)	Nelson (5–3)	**Phillips** (16)	27,485	67–46
114	August 10	Rockies	**W** 2–1	**Yarbrough** (5–5)	Doyle (0–1)	**Graterol** (5)	45,933	68–46
115	August 11	Rockies	**W** 6–1	**Lynn** (9–9)	Gomber (9–9)	—	49,315	69–46
116	August 12	Rockies	**W** 4–1	**Gonsolin** (8–4)	Lambert (2–4)	**Phillips** (17)	52,515	70–46
117	August 13	Rockies	**W** 8–3	**Urías** (10–6)	Freeland (4–13)	—	45,904	71–46
118	August 15	Brewers	**W** 6–2	**B. Miller** (7–2)	Houser (4–4)	**Yarbrough** (1)	46,050	72–46
119	August 16	Brewers	**W** 7–1	**Kershaw** (11–4)	Miley (6–3)	—	41,413	73–46
120	August 17	Brewers	**W** 1–0	**Ferguson** (7–3)	Payamps (4–3)	**Phillips** (18)	43,195	74–46
121	August 18	Marlins	L 3–11	Alcántara (6–10)	**Gonsolin** (8–5)	—	46,053	74–47
122	August 19 (1)	Marlins	**W** 3–1	**Yarbrough** (6–5)	Robertson (4–4)	**Phillips** (19)	40,895	75–47
123	August 19 (2) (Note: This game was originally scheduled for August 20, but was moved up a day because of Hurricane Hilary making landfall in Southern California.)	Marlins	**W** 3–1	**Urías** (11–6)	Garrett (7–4)	**Graterol** (6)	52,668	76–47
124	August 22	@ Guardians	L 3–8	Hentges (2–2)	**B. Miller** (7–3)	—	22,173	76–48
125	August 24 (1) (Note: This game was suspended due to inclement weather on August 23rd in the top of 3rd with the Dodgers leading 3–1. It will resume at 12:10pm EST)	@ Guardians	**W** 6–1	**Varland** (1–0)	Curry (3–2)	—		77–48
126	August 24 (2)	@ Guardians	**W** 9–3	**Yarbrough** (7–5)	Williams (1–5)	—	23,533	78–48
127	August 25	@ Red Sox	**W** 7–4	**Lynn** (10–9)	Pivetta (9–7)	**Phillips** (20)	35,653	79–48
128	August 26	@ Red Sox	L 5–8	Bernardino (2–1)	**Urías** (11–7)	Schreiber (1)	35,986	79–49
129	August 27	@ Red Sox	**W** 7–4	**Stone** (1–0)	Houck (3–8)	**Phillips** (21)	33,954	80–49
130	August 28	Diamondbacks	**W** 7–4	**B. Miller** (8–3)	Gallen (14–6)	**Ferguson** (3)	36,521	81–49
131	August 29	Diamondbacks	**W** 9–1	**Kershaw** (12–4)	Kelly (10–6)	—	42,323	82–49
132	August 30	Diamondbacks	**W** 7–0	**Pepiot** (1–0)	Pfaadt (1–7)	**Yarbrough** (2)	50,953	83–49
133	August 31	Braves	L 7–8	Strider (16–4)	**Lynn** (10–10)	Iglesias (27)	47,623	83–50

September/October: 17–12 (Home: 8–6; Away: 9–6)

#	Date	Opponent	Score	Win	Loss	Save	Attendance	Record
134	September 1	Braves	L 3–6	Fried (6–1)	**Urías** (11–8)	Yates (3)	52,436	83–51
135	September 2	Braves	L 2–4 (10)	Tonkin (6–2)	**Vesia** (0–5)	Iglesias (28)	51,470	83–52
136	September 3	Braves	**W** 3–1	**B. Miller** (9–3)	Morton (14–11)	**Graterol** (7)	47,499	84–52
137	September 5	@ Marlins	L 3–6	Nardi (7–1)	**Yarbrough** (7–6)	Scott (5)	11,472	84–53
138	September 6	@ Marlins	L 4–11	Cabrera (6–6)	**Lynn** (10–11)	—	10,591	84–54
139	September 7	@ Marlins	**W** 10–0	**Pepiot** (2–0)	Garrett (8–6)	—	12,047	85–54
140	September 8	@ Nationals	**W** 8–5	**Vesia** (1–5)	Garcia (0–2)	**Phillips** (22)	32,561	86–54
141	September 9	@ Nationals	L 6–7 (11)	Machado (4–1)	**Varland** (1–1)	—	34,562	86–55
142	September 10	@ Nationals	**W** 7–3	**Suero** (1–0)	Williams (6–10)	—	27,546	87–55
143	September 11	Padres	L 8–11	Suárez (3–2)	**Phillips** (1–4)	—	34,816	87–56
144	September 12	Padres	**W** 11–2	**Lynn** (11–11)	Wacha (11–4)	—	42,194	88–56
145	September 13	Padres	L 1–6	Snell (14–9)	**Pepiot** (2–1)	—	41,810	88–57
146	September 15	@ Mariners	**W** 6–3	**B. Miller** (10–3)	Kirby (10–10)	**Phillips** (23)	43,823	89–57
147	September 16	@ Mariners	**W** 6–2 (11)	**Phillips** (2–4)	Speier (2–2)	—	45,818	90–57
148	September 17	@ Mariners	**W** 6–1	**Yarbrough** (8–6)	Gilbert (13–6)	**Stone** (1)	45,477	91–57
149	September 18	Tigers	**W** 8–3	**Lynn** (12–11)	Rodríguez (11–9)	—	37,239	92–57
150	September 19	Tigers	**W** 3–2	**Vesia** (2–5)	Lange (7–5)	—	42,223	93–57
151	September 20	Tigers	L 2–4	Olson (5–7)	**B. Miller** (10–4)	Vest (2)	42,635	93–58
152	September 21	Giants	**W** 7–2	**S. Miller** (2–0)	Brebbia (3–1)	—	43,942	94–58
153	September 22	Giants	L 1–5	Manaea (7–6)	**Stone** (1–1)	Doval (38)	52,887	94–59
154	September 23	Giants	**W** 7–0	**Kershaw** (13–4)	Brebbia (3–2)	—	52,704	95–59
155	September 24	Giants	**W** 3–2 (10)	**S. Miller** (3–0)	Doval (6–6)	—	48,315	96–59
156	September 26 (1)	@ Rockies	L 1–4	Anderson (1–6)	**Ferguson** (7–4)	Kinley (5)	24,648	96–60
157	September 26 (2)	@ Rockies	**W** 11–2	**B. Miller** (11–4)	Feltner (2–4)	—	25,133	97–60
158	September 27	@ Rockies	**W** 8–2	**Sheehan** (4–1)	Davis (0–4)	—	26,054	98–60
159	September 28	@ Rockies	L 5–14	Flexen (2–8)	**Yarbrough** (8–7)	—	30,129	98–61
160	September 29	@ Giants	**W** 6–2	**Lynn** (13–11)	Winn (1–3)	—	38,159	99–61
161	September 30	@ Giants	L 1–2	Walker (5–3)	**Kershaw** (13–5)	Doval (39)	39,253	99–62
162	October 1	@ Giants	**W** 5–2	**González** (3–3)	Brebbia (3–5)	**Phillips** (24)	38,359	100–62

Legend: = Win = Loss = Postponement
Bold = Dodgers team member

=== Season summary ===
Opening Day starters
Name	Position
Mookie Betts	Right fielder
Freddie Freeman	First baseman
Will Smith	Catcher
Max Muncy	Third baseman
J. D. Martinez	Designated Hitter
David Peralta	Left fielder
Miguel Vargas	Second baseman
James Outman	Center fielder
Miguel Rojas	Shortstop
Julio Urías	Starting pitcher

==== March ====
The Dodgers began their season on March 30 with an 8–2 victory over the Arizona Diamondbacks at Dodger Stadium. Julio Urías allowed four hits and two runs in six innings while Will Smith had three hits and four RBI and James Outman had two hits including a home run. Dustin May pitched seven shutout innings in the next game, but the Diamondbacks won 2–1 thanks to a pinch-hit two-run home run by Kyle Lewis in the eighth.

==== April ====
The Dodgers won on April 1, 10–1. Clayton Kershaw struck out nine batters in six innings and Trayce Thompson hit three home runs, including a first inning grand slam, and drove in eight RBI. In the final game of the series, Noah Syndergaard was solid in his Dodger debut, allowing only one run while striking out six in six innings. Smith homered, but the Diamondbacks rallied late and won the game 2–1 when a run scored on an infield hit that was misfielded by Brusdar Graterol in the ninth. The Colorado Rockies came to town next and the Dodgers beat them 13–4 by scoring seven runs in the fifth inning. Urías struck out six in six scoreless innings in his next start and the Dodgers beat the Rockies 5–2.

The Dodgers began their first road trip of the season on April 6, with a four-game trip to Chase Field to play the Diamondbacks. May struck out five in six innings and the Dodgers took the opener 5–2. However, they lost the next game 6–3 as Kershaw allowed back-to-back home runs to lead off the sixth inning. The Diamondbacks won the third game of the series, 12–8. The Diamondbacks took the series with an 11–6 victory in the finale. Michael Grove gave up nine runs in only 3 1/3 innings. The Dodgers next traveled to Oracle Park for a series with the San Francisco Giants. Urías struck out eight in six innings while Max Muncy hit two home runs, including a grand slam, in the 9–1 win. However, they managed only three hits the next day in a 5–0 shutout loss. Muncy hit two more home runs in the series finale and Thompson hit another as the Dodgers won 10–5. Muncy's 11 RBI in a three-game series tied for second most in team history behind Frank Howard's 12 in 1962.

They returned home on April 14 to face the Chicago Cubs. The Cubs hit five homeruns, including four off of reliever Andre Jackson in his two innings of work and won 8–2. On Jackie Robinson Day, pinch hitter David Peralta hit a two-run walk off single to win the second game of the series. The Cubs took the last game of the series, winning 3–2. The New York Mets came to Los Angeles for the next series. Freddie Freeman homered twice in the opening game of the series, but the Dodgers pitching struggled and the Mets won 8–6. In the next game, Kershaw struck out nine in seven scoreless innings to pick up his 200th career win as J. D. Martinez homered twice and the Dodgers won 5–0. The Mets won the series with a 5–3 victory in the finale. Brandon Nimmo was 5 for 5 including a home run.

The Dodgers began a four-game series at Wrigley Field against the Cubs on April 20. James Outman had two home runs, including the go-ahead grand slam in the ninth as the Dodgers opened the series with a 6–2 win. In the next game, they managed just one hit off of Drew Smyly and the pitching was blasted to a 13–0 blowout lost. The Dodgers took the third game of the series, 9–4, as both Outman and Muncy hit two home runs in the game. Muncy homered again the next day, one of four to do so for the Dodgers as they took the series with a 7–3 win. The Dodgers next began a three-game series at PNC Park against the Pittsburgh Pirates. The Dodgers fell behind early but came back to win the game 8–7 on a three-run homerun by Chris Taylor in the eighth inning. The Pirates took the next game, 8–1 and won the series with a 6–2 victory in the finale.

The Dodgers returned home on August 28 to play the St. Louis Cardinals. Jason Heyward drove in two runs on two hits in the next game as the Dodgers won 7–3. The following day, Kershaw allowed only two hits while striking out nine in seven innings and the Dodgers won 1–0. The Dodgers finished April with 6–3 victory over the Cardinals to complete the sweep.

==== May ====
The Philadelphia Phillies came to town next and the Dodgers beat them 13–4 with the help of four home runs. Julio Urías struck out 10 in seven innings in the next game in a 13–1 win. The Dodgers came from behind to win the last game of the series and complete the sweep, 10–6, on a walk-off grand slam home run by Max Muncy, the first Dodger to hit one since Andre Ethier in 2010.

Next on the schedule was a weekend series against the San Diego Padres at Petco Park. Fernando Tatís Jr. homered twice in the opener and the Dodgers pitchers walked 11 in a 5–2 loss. In the next game, Dustin May allowed only three hits in six scoreless innings and a two-run home run by Chris Taylor in the fourth inning was all the Dodgers needed in a 2–1 win. In the final game of the series, the Padres took a 2–0 lead in the first inning which lasted until the Dodgers tied the game in the ninth on a Mookie Betts home run in the ninth and then won the game, 5–2, by scoring three runs in the 10th on a RBI hit by Michael Busch and a two-run home run by James Outman. The Dodgers lost the opening game of a three-game series against the Milwaukee Brewers at American Family Field, 9–3. Betts led off the next game with a home run and the Dodgers won 6–2. Clayton Kershaw struck out eight in seven innings as they finished off the series with an 8–1 win.

The Dodgers returned home to play the Padres. Back-to-back home runs by Mookie Betts and Freddie Freeman in the seventh inning gave them a 4–2 win in the opener. In the next game, J. D. Martinez hit a three-run home run in the first inning and Urías pitched seven strong innings as they again won 4–2. The Dodgers finished off a sweep of the Padres with a 4–0 win. Betts hit a two-run home run and Miguel Vargas drove in the other two runs with a hit. Tony Gonsolin struck out six in five scoreless innings. The Dodgers started their next series against the Minnesota Twins on May 15. Max Muncy hit two home runs in the game as the Dodgers took an early 5–2 lead. However the Twins tied things up on a three-run home run by Trevor Larnach in the eighth and the game went into extra innings. The Dodgers eventually won, 9–8, on a bases loaded walk by Trayce Thompson in the 12th inning. The Twins took the next game, 5–1. The Dodgers took the series from the Twins, 7–3, on a tie-breaking grand slam by Outman in the seventh.

The Dodgers traveled to Busch Stadium for a four-game series against the St. Louis Cardinals beginning May 18. In the opener, Freeman hit his 300th career home run, a grand slam, but the Dodgers pitching allowed seven home runs (including two each by Willson Contreras and Nolan Gorman) and lost 16–8. In the next game, Gonsolin and four relivers kept the Cardinals scoreless while Betts hit a three-run home run and the Dodgers won 5–0. A three-run home run by Gorman in the eighth inning broke open a tie game and the Cardinals won 6–5 in the third game. The Cardinals took the series with a 10–5 win. The next series was against the Atlanta Braves at Truist Park. Eddie Rosario hit a three-run home run off of Gavin Stone in the first inning as the Braves took a quick 4–0 lead but the Dodgers came back thanks to two home runs by J. D. Martinez and one by Freeman and won 8–6. In the following game, Bobby Miller made his major league debut, allowing one run on four hits in five innings while Jason Heyward and Martinez homered in a 8–1 win. The Braves took the series finale, 4–3, on a walk-off sacrifice fly by Ozzie Albies. The road trip concluded with a three-game trip to Tropicana Field to play the Tampa Bay Rays, who took game one 9–3. The next day, Muncy homered and doubled and Freeman drove in the go-ahead run with a double in the eighth as the Dodgers came from behind to win, 6–5. In the finale, the Dodgers hit five homeruns, including two by Chris Taylor but lost to the Rays in a shoot out, 11–10.

The Dodgers returned home on Memorial Day to play the Washington Nationals. Miller allowed one run in six innings and Martinez hit a three-run home run in a 6–1 win. The Dodgers hit three home runs in the next game in a 9–3 win. Freddie Freeman had four hits in five at-bats in the game. However the Nationals avoided the sweep as they hit five home runs (two by former Dodger prospect Keibert Ruiz) and won the series finale, 10–6.

==== June ====
The Dodgers began the month of June with a home series against the New York Yankees. Mookie Betts homered twice as the Dodgers won the opener, 8–4. In the next game it was Jake Bauers of the Yankees who hit two homers as they won 6–3. Bobby Miller struck out seven while allowing only one hit and two walks in six scoreless innings in the finale but the Dodgers offense only got a J. D. Martinez home run and the Yankees scored against the Dodgers bullpen to win the game, 4–1.

The Dodgers began their next road trip at Great American Ball Park against the Cincinnati Reds. Freddie Freeman hit a grand slam homer but the Dodgers bullpen imploded, with Caleb Ferguson walking three and hitting a batter in the ninth as the Reds came from behind to walk it off 9–8. The Dodgers hit three more homers in the next game, but again the bullpen faltered with Will Benson hitting a walk-off home run as the Reds won 8−6. Clayton Kershaw struck out nine in seven scoreless innings in the series finale, as the Dodgers won 6–0, to avoid getting swept. The next series, at Citizens Bank Park against the Philadelphia Phillies, began with another walk-off loss as Kyle Schwarber hit a homerun off Ferguson. Bobby Miller struck out seven while allowing only three hits in six scoreless innings the next day, while the Dodgers got home runs from David Peralta and Martinez in a 9–0 win. The Dodgers ended the road trip by rolling out a bullpen game on June 11 and it did not go well as they lost 7–3.

The Dodgers returned home to play the Chicago White Sox. They scored four runs in the first and went on to win 5–1 as Tony Gonsolin pitched six scoreless innings. The poor bullpen cost the Dodgers the game again the following day, when the White Sox scored six runs in the last two innings to win 8–4. The Dodgers won the next day 5–4, in 11 innings. Chris Taylor hit a grand slam homer in the sixth to tie the game and then Freeman drove home the winning run in extra innings. Emmet Sheehan made his major league debut for the Dodgers in the next game against the San Francisco Giants, pitching six scoreless, no-hit innings. However, after he left the game the bullpen imploded and the Dodgers lost 7–5 in extra innings. The Dodgers were shut out 15–0 by the Giants in the next game, the most lopsided shutout loss since 1965. They lost again the next day, 7–3, the first series sweep by the Giants at Dodger Stadium since the 2012 season. The games against the Giants were controversial since the organization had disinvited, then reinvited, a group named the Sisters of Perpetual Indulgence to participate on the Dodgers' LGBTQ "Pride night", triggering protests from some Christian groups,

The Dodgers next traveled to Angel Stadium to play the Los Angeles Angels in a quick two-game series. Kershaw and Reid Detmers each pitched seven shutout innings but the Dodgers scored in the eighth to win the game 2–0. The Dodgers went with a bullpen game the next day, and the bullpen came through only allowing two hits as they pitched a shutout. The Dodgers got two solo home runs, one each by Freeman and Miguel Vargas in a 2–0 win.

They returned home to play the Houston Astros and won the opener 3–2 behind solid pitching by Sheehan and a Betts home run. In the next game, Miller had a shaky start, allowing six runs on 10 hits in only four innings. But the Dodgers game from behind, getting a two-run homer from Peralta in the seventh and scoring three in the eighth on three walks, a sacrifice fly, a double by James Outman and a balk, and won the game 8–7. In the final game of the series, the Dodgers trailed 4–2, came back to tie the game on a Will Smith homer in the eighth only to lose, 6–5 in 11 innings.

The next road trip began at Coors Field against the Colorado Rockies. Kershaw only allowed one hit and one walk in six scoreless innings. J. D. Martinez hit two home runs and the Dodgers won 5–0. The Rockies scored five runs in the sixth to come from behind and beat the Dodgers 9–8 in the following game. Martinez had four hits including a home run in a 14–3 victory the following game. Next they traveled to Kauffman Stadium to face the Kansas City Royals. Betts had four hits in four at-bats, with two walks and two home runs in a 9–3 victory to end the month.

==== July ====
The Dodgers started July by losing the final two games of their series with the Royals, 6–4 and 9–1.

They returned home on July 3 to play the Pittsburgh Pirates. A Max Muncy home run helped the Dodgers to a 5–2 win in the opener. On Independence Day, James Outman hit two home runs and Jonny DeLuca hit his first career homer, however the bullpen faltered and the Pirates scored three times in the top of the ninth to win the game 9–8. The Dodgers got back-to-back home runs by J. D. Martinez and David Peralta as part of a four-run fifth inning that helped them overcome an early deficit and beat the Pirates 6–4. Julio Urías struck out eight in six innings and Freddie Freeman and Muncy homered as the Dodgers finished the series with a 5–2 win. The Dodgers hit five home runs (including two by Mookie Betts) as they took the opener of a two-game series with the Los Angeles Angels 11–4. And they hit another five homers in the next game, as they went into the all-star break with a 10–5 victory over the Angels.

The Dodgers had five players selected for the 2023 Major League Baseball All-Star Game, which was played at T-Mobile Park in Seattle on July 11. Betts, Freeman and Martinez were all selected as starters, while Will Smith was a reserve and Clayton Kershaw was selected but unable to participate due to injury.

They began the second half of the season by playing the New York Mets at Citi Field. Julio Urías struck out seven while allowing only one hit in six scoreless innings as the Dodgers won 6–0. Betts had four hits, including a home run, as the Dodgers also took the next game, 5–1. The Mets took the final game of the series, 2–1, in 10 innings. The Dodgers next traveled to Oriole Park at Camden Yards for a series with the Baltimore Orioles. A sixth inning grand slam by Chris Taylor helped them win 6–4. They followed that up with a 10–3 win in the following game but dropped the series finale, 8–5. They followed that with a three-game series against the Texas Rangers at Globe Life Field. Freeman homered and doubled in the 11–5 victory. He hit two more homeruns in the next game, part of five total by the Dodgers in a 16–3 rout of the Rangers. Max Muncy hit a grand slam in the first inning but the Rangers came back and won the series finale, 8–4.

The Dodgers returned home on July 24 for a three-game series against the Toronto Blue Jays. The Blue Jays took the opener, 6–3, in 11 innings with Daulton Varsho's two run double putting them ahead. The following day, the Dodgers won 8–7 on a 10th inning walk-off double by James Outman, who reached base five times in the game (three hits and two walks). However, the Blue Jays took the series with a 8–1 rout in the finale. The Dodgers lost the first game of a series against the Cincinnati Reds, 6–5. Max Muncy homered twice as they won 3–2 in the second game, but they were blown out in the finale, 9–0.

==== August ====
The Oakland Athletics came to town next and Lance Lynn, acquired a few days earlier in a trade with the Chicago White Sox, allowed three runs with seven strikeouts in seven innings in his Dodgers debut, a 7–3 win. The Dodgers hit four home runs in a 10–1 rout in game two. Freddie Freeman homered and doubled twice as the Dodgers swept the series with an 8–2 win in the finale.

Next up was a series against the San Diego Padres at Petco Park. The Dodgers scored five runs in the eight and three in the ninth in 10–5 win in the opener. The next day, the Padres scored seven in the eighth en rout to a 8–3 win to even up the series. Lynn allowed only one run in six innings in the next game, while the Dodgers hit three homers in a 8–2 win. They scored eight runs in the fourth inning the next day, culminating with a grand slam by Mookie Betts as the Dodgers took the series with a 13–7 win. The Dodgers followed that up by sweeping a two game series against the Arizona Diamondbacks at Chase Field. Julio Urías pitched six shutout innings in a 5–4 victory and Bobby Miller matched him the next day in a 2–0 win.

The Dodgers returned home on August 10 for a four-game series against the Colorado Rockies. Clayton Kershaw returned from a stint on the injured list to pitch five strong innings and Max Muncy homered in a 2–1 win to open the series. The next day, Lynn struck out nine batters in five scoreless innings and the Dodgers won 6–1 to extend their winning streak to six games. Will Smith and James Outman each homered in the following game, a 4–1 win. They completed a four-game sweep with an 8–3 win highlighted by Urías 12 strikeouts in seven innings. The Dodgers swept a three-game series with the Milwaukee Brewers from August 15–17, extending the winning streak to 11 games. Bobby Miller pitched six innings in a 6–2 victory in the first game. Betts had three hits and four runs scored in the following game, a 7–1 rout and in the final game, Lance Lynn pitched seven scoreless innings and Austin Barnes solo homer in the eighth accounted for the only score in a 1–0 win. The streak came to an end the next day, when the Miami Marlins blew out the Dodgers 11–3. The Dodgers and Marlins played a doubleheader on August 19, as the originally scheduled game for the following day was moved up because of the anticipated arrival of Hurricane Hilary. The Dodgers swept the doubleheader. Ryan Pepiot allowed one run in five innings in his first appearance of the season and the Dodgers scored three runs in the eighth to win 3–1 in the early game. Mookie Betts hit two home runs in the second game, as the Dodgers also won that one 3–1.

The Dodgers traveled to Progressive Field to play the Cleveland Guardians. They pulled out to a three-run lead early only for the Guardians to score five in the seventh inning enroute to a 8–3 win. The game the following day was suspended after two innings because of rain, forcing the teams to continue it as part of a doubleheader on August 23. Betts had five hits in five at-bats, including a homer as they took the continued game, 6–1. They finished off the series with a 9–3 win, which included the first career major league homer from Michael Busch. Next up was a series at Fenway Park against the Boston Red Sox. In the opener, the Dodgers hit three home runs and won 7–4. In the next game, Boston came back with four runs in the sixth inning (three on a homer by Adam Duvall) to pull off an 8–5 win. Outman and Betts homered in the last game as the Dodgers won 7–4. Freeman set a new LA Dodgers single season record with his 50th double.

The Dodgers returned home to begin their final home stand of August with a series against the Diamondbacks. They slugged four home runs for a 7–4 victory in the opener. Chris Taylor had three hits in three at-bats on his bobblehead night and Kershaw tied Don Drysdale for second most wins in club history as the Dodgers blew out the Diamondbacks 9–1 in the second game. The Dodgers completed the sweep of the Diamondbacks with a 7–0 win. Pepiot and Ryan Yarbrough combined for the shutout. Next up was a four-game series against Atlanta Braves, holder of the best record in the National League. Mookie Betts hit two home runs in the first game, but the Braves won the game 8–7.

==== September ====
The Dodgers began September by losing the next game to the Braves, 6–3, with Kolten Wong's three run homer in the eighth inning accounting for their only runs. Bryce Elder and Emmet Sheehan engaged in a pitching duel the following day as the game remained tied at one until the 10th inning when Orlando Arcia hit a three-run homer to make it 4–1. Bobby Miller allowed only one run in seven innings as the Dodgers prevented a sweep with a 3–1 win in the finale.

The Dodgers next traveled to play the Miami Marlins at LoanDepot Park. The Marlins took the opener 6–3 after back-to-back homers by Bryan De La Cruz and Jazz Chisholm Jr. off Ryan Yarbrough in the eighth inning. The Marlins scored nine runs in the fifth inning off Lance Lynn to rout the Dodgers 11–4 in the second game of the series. On September 7, Ryan Pepiot took a perfect game into the seventh inning before allowing a single to Josh Bell. The Dodgers won the game 10–0 to avoid being swept. Next on the road trip was a three-game series against the Washington Nationals at Nationals Park. The Dodgers took the opener 8–5 with three home runs and Freddie Freeman hit his 53rd double of the season, breaking the Dodgers franchise record set by Johnny Frederick of the 1929 Brooklyn Robins. The Nationals won the next game, 7–6, in 11 innings, scoring the winning run on a wild pitch by Gus Varland. The Dodgers won the series finale, 7–3.

The Dodgers returned home on September 11 for a three-game series with the San Diego Padres. Mookie Betts hit a leadoff homer in the opener, and drove in three more runs in the third, giving him 103 RBI on the season, tying the MLB record for most RBI from the leadoff spot, set by Charlie Blackmon in 2017. However, the Dodgers lost the game, 11–8. In the following game, Lance Lynn allowed two runs in seven innings, Freeman had four hits (including a homer and a double) and the Dodgers won 11–2. The Dodgers managed only three hits off Blake Snell and three relievers as the Padres beat them 6–1 in the finale.

The Dodgers next had a three-game road trip against the Seattle Mariners at T-Mobile Park. Bobby Miller struck out seven in 5 2/3 innings and Miguel Rojas and James Outman homered in the 6–3 win. In the next game, a pitching duel kept the game scoreless through regulation before the Dodgers erupted for five runs in the 11th enroute to a 6–1 victory which clinched their 10th National League West title in 11 years. The brief road trip was wrapped up with a 6–1 victory. Jason Heyward, Austin Barnes and Outman homered in the game.

They began the final home stand of the season on September 18 against the Detroit Tigers. J. D. Martinez hit two home runs in a 8–3 win. The Dodgers won the next game, 3–2, on a walkoff hit by Max Muncy. However, they only managed three hits in the series finale, dropping it 4–2. Next up was a four-game series against the San Francisco Giants. Emmet Sheehan struck out nine in 4 2/3 hitless innings as the Dodgers began the series with a 7–2 win. They lost the next game, 5–1, though Freeman picked up his 200th hit of the season in the game. On September 23, Clayton Kershaw struck out five and only allowed two hits in five scoreless innings as the Dodgers won 7–0, giving him his 210th career win, passing Don Drysdale for second all-time in franchise history. Betts also homered twice in the game, as the Dodgers clinched a first-round bye in the playoffs. The Dodgers finished off the home schedule with a 3–2 walk-off win in 10 innings.

The regular season wrapped up with a seven game road trip, starting with four against the Colorado Rockies at Coors Field. The first two were played as a day/night doubleheader on September 16. In the opener Ryan Pepiot struck out nine in six innings but the Rockies won 4–1 while in the second game Bobby Miller also struck out nine, in seven innings in a 11–2 win. Sheehan struck out 10 in six innings and Outman and Freeman homered as the Dodgers took the next game, 8–2. The Rockies won the final game of the series, 14–5. The Dodgers headed into the final series of the regular season against the Giants at Oracle Park. J. D. Martinez hit a three-run homer in the sixth inning for the 1,000th RBI of his career. The Dodgers won 6–2. The Giants won the next game, 2–1, but the Dodgers won the last game of the regular season, 5–2. That victory gave them the 100th win of the season, the first team in MLB history to do so in four straight non-shortened seasons.

== Postseason ==
=== Game log ===
2023 Postseason Game Log: 0–3 (Home: 0–2; Away: 0–1)
National League Division Series: 0–3 (Home: 0–2; Away: 0–1)

#	Date	Opponent	Score	Win	Loss	Save	Attendance	Record
1	October 7	Diamondbacks	L 2–11	Kelly (1–0)	Kershaw (0–1)	—	51,653	0–1
2	October 9	Diamondbacks	L 2–4	Gallen (2–0)	B. Miller (0–1)	Sewald (3)	51,449	0–2
3	October 11	@ Diamondbacks	L 2–4	Mantiply (2–0)	Lynn (0–1)	Sewald (4)	48,175	0–3

=== Postseason rosters ===
Playoff rosters
National League Division Series

- Pitchers: 17 Joe Kelly 18 Shelby Miller 22 Clayton Kershaw 35 Lance Lynn 47 Ryan Pepiot 48 Brusdar Graterol 51 Alex Vesia 57 Ryan Brasier 59 Evan Phillips 64 Caleb Ferguson 70 Bobby Miller 78 Michael Grove 80 Emmet Sheehan
- Catchers: 15 Austin Barnes 16 Will Smith
- Infielders: 3 Chris Taylor 5 Freddie Freeman 8 Kiké Hernández 11 Miguel Rojas 13 Max Muncy 25 Kolten Wong
- Outfielders: 6 David Peralta 23 Jason Heyward 33 James Outman 50 Mookie Betts
- Designated hitters: 28 J. D. Martinez

=== Division Series ===
The Dodgers opened the playoffs at home by facing the Arizona Diamondbacks. In game 1, Clayton Kershaw had the worst start of his career and the worst Dodger postseason pitching performance in history, allowing six runs in the first inning while only recording one out. The Diamondbacks proceeded to rout the Dodgers 11–2. In the second game, the Diamondbacks again started fast, scoring three runs in the first off Bobby Miller, who only lasted 1 2/3 innings. The bullpen only allowed one run the rest of the game, but the Dodgers offense remained silent, getting only a couple of runs, one on a solo homer by J. D. Martinez as they lost 4–2.

In game 3 at Chase Field, Lance Lynn allowed four home runs in the third inning, the first time any team had done that in a postseason inning and it held up as the Diamondbacks swept the Dodgers with a 4–2 win.

== Roster ==
2023 Los Angeles Dodgers
Roster
Pitchers: 38 Yency Almonte; 52 Phil Bickford; 57 Ryan Brasier; 63 Justin Bruihl; 29 Dylan Covey; 62 Tyler Cyr; 64 Caleb Ferguson; 26 Tony Gonsolin; 81 Victor González; 48 Brusdar Graterol; 78 Michael Grove; 93 Bryan Hudson; 41 Daniel Hudson; 63 Kyle Hurt; 44 Andre Jackson; 17 Joe Kelly; 22 Clayton Kershaw; 56 Adam Kolarek; 35 Lance Lynn; 85 Dustin May; 70 Bobby Miller; 18 Shelby Miller; 58,61 Tyson Miller; 47 Ryan Pepiot; 59 Evan Phillips; 46 Jake Reed; 72 Nick Robertson; 61 Tayler Scott; 80 Emmet Sheehan; 71 Gavin Stone; 46 Wander Suero; 43 Noah Syndergaard; 7 Julio Urías; 58 Gus Varland; 51 Alex Vesia; 56 Ryan Yarbrough	Catchers: 15 Austin Barnes; 16 Will Smith; 29 Austin Wynns; Infielders: 83 Michael Busch; 5 Freddie Freeman; 8 Kiké Hernández; 60 Yonny Hernández; 13 Max Muncy; 11 Miguel Rojas; 31 Amed Rosario; 17 Miguel Vargas; 37 Luke Williams; 25 Kolten Wong	Outfielders: 50 Mookie Betts; 89 Jonny DeLuca; 23 Jason Heyward; 12 Jake Marisnick; 28 J. D. Martinez; 33 James Outman; 6 David Peralta; 3 Chris Taylor; 25 Trayce Thompson	Manager: 30 Dave Roberts; Coaches: 54 Josh Bard (bullpen); 65 Aaron Bates (hitting); 82 Steve Cilladi (bullpen catcher); 91 Dino Ebel (third base); 88 Bob Geren (Major league field coordinator); 0 Danny Lehmann (bench); 86 Clayton McCullough (first base); 87 Connor McGuiness (assistant pitching); 99 Mark Prior (pitching); 72 Robert Van Scoyoc (hitting)

== Statistics ==
=== Batting ===
Stats in bold are the team leaders.

- Indicates league leader.

Note: G = Games played; AB = At bats; R = Runs; H = Hits; 2B = Doubles; 3B = Triples; HR = Home runs; RBI = Runs batted in; BB = Walks; SO = Strikeouts; SB = Stolen bases; AVG = Batting average; OBP = On-base percentage; SLG = Slugging percentage; OPS = On base + slugging

Player	G	AB	R	H	2B	3B	HR	RBI	BB	SO	SB	AVG	OBP	SLG	OPS
Freddie Freeman	**161**	**637**	**131**	**211**	**59***	2	29	102	72	121	**23**	**.331**	**.410**	.567	.977
Mookie Betts	152	584	126	179	40	1	**39**	**107**	**96**	107	14	.307	.408	**.579**	**.987**
James Outman	151	483	86	120	16	3	23	70	68	**181**	16	.248	.353	.437	.790
Max Muncy	135	482	95	102	17	1	36	105	85	153	1	.212	.333	.475	.808
Will Smith	126	464	80	121	21	2	19	76	63	89	3	.261	.359	.438	.797
J. D. Martinez	113	432	61	117	27	2	33	103	34	149	1	.271	.321	.572	.893
David Peralta	133	394	47	102	25	1	7	55	20	72	4	.259	.294	.381	.675
Miguel Rojas	125	385	49	91	16	1	5	31	26	48	8	.236	.290	.322	.612
Chris Taylor	117	338	51	80	15	1	15	56	41	125	16	.237	.326	.420	.746
Jason Heyward	124	334	56	90	23	0	15	40	34	64	2	.269	.340	.473	.813
Miguel Vargas	81	256	36	50	15	**4**	7	32	38	61	3	.195	.305	.367	.672
Austin Barnes	59	178	15	32	5	0	2	11	17	43	2	.180	.256	.242	.498
Kiké Hernández	54	168	19	44	12	0	5	30	12	29	1	.262	.308	.423	.731
Amed Rosario	48	125	19	32	6	2	3	18	7	22	6	.256	.301	.408	.709
Michael Busch	27	72	9	12	3	0	2	7	8	27	1	.167	.247	.292	.539
Trayce Thompson	36	71	12	11	0	0	5	14	15	37	0	.155	.310	.366	.676
Jonny DeLuca	24	42	5	11	1	0	2	6	3	8	1	.262	.311	.429	.740
Kolten Wong	20	30	4	9	0	0	2	8	2	7	2	.300	.353	.500	.853
Yonny Hernández	14	22	5	3	1	0	0	4	2	8	0	.136	.231	.182	.413
Austin Wynns	5	11	0	2	1	0	0	2	1	5	0	.182	.250	.273	.523
Luke Williams	4	10	0	1	0	0	0	0	0	3	1	.100	.100	.100	.200
Jake Marisnick	4	5	0	2	0	0	0	0	0	0	0	.400	.500	.400	.900
Shelby Miller	1	1	0	0	0	0	0	0	0	0	0	.000	.000	.000	.000
**Totals**	162	5524	906	1422	303	20	249	877	644	1359	105	.257	.340	.455	.795

=== Pitching ===
List does not include position players. Stats in bold are the team leaders.

Note: W = Wins; L = Losses; ERA = Earned run average; G = Games pitched; GS = Games started; SV = Saves; IP = Innings pitched; H = Hits allowed; R = Runs allowed; ER = Earned runs allowed; BB = Walks allowed; K = Strikeouts

Player	W	L	ERA	G	GS	SV	IP	H	R	ER	BB	K
Clayton Kershaw	**13**	5	2.46	24	**24**	0	**131.2**	100	39	36	**40**	**137**
Bobby Miller	11	4	3.76	22	22	0	124.1	105	53	52	32	119
Julio Urías	11	**8**	4.60	21	21	0	117.1	**112**	**61**	**60**	24	117
Tony Gonsolin	8	5	4.98	20	20	0	103.0	86	**61**	57	**40**	82
Michael Grove	2	3	6.13	18	12	0	69.0	83	47	47	19	73
Brusdar Graterol	4	2	1.20	**68**	1	7	67.1	53	14	9	12	48
Lance Lynn	7	2	4.36	11	11	0	64.0	59	33	31	22	47
Evan Phillips	2	4	2.05	62	0	**24**	61.1	38	19	14	13	66
Caleb Ferguson	7	4	3.43	**68**	7	3	60.1	64	30	23	23	70
Emmet Sheehan	4	1	4.92	13	11	1	60.1	46	33	33	26	64
Noah Syndergaard	1	4	7.16	12	12	0	55.1	71	44	44	9	38
Alex Vesia	2	5	4.35	56	1	1	49.2	52	27	24	17	64
Yency Almonte	3	2	5.06	49	0	0	48.0	43	30	27	24	49
Dustin May	4	1	2.63	9	9	0	48.0	29	14	14	16	34
Phil Bickford	2	3	5.14	36	0	0	42.0	38	27	24	26	48
Shelby Miller	3	0	1.71	36	1	1	42.0	19	8	8	19	42
Ryan Pepiot	2	1	2.14	8	3	0	42.0	27	10	10	5	38
Ryan Brasier	2	0	0.70	39	0	1	38.2	18	6	3	10	38
Ryan Yarbrough	4	2	4.89	11	2	2	38.2	44	21	21	5	38
Victor González	3	3	4.01	34	1	0	33.2	27	15	15	10	30
Gavin Stone	1	0	9.00	8	4	1	31.0	46	32	31	13	22
Justin Bruihl	1	0	4.07	20	0	0	24.1	24	11	11	8	19
Andre Jackson	0	0	6.62	7	0	2	17.2	22	13	13	3	16
Gus Varland	1	1	3.09	8	0	0	11.2	12	6	4	8	14
Joe Kelly	1	0	1.74	11	0	0	10.1	3	3	2	6	19
Nick Robertson	0	1	6.10	9	0	0	10.1	17	10	7	4	13
Bryan Hudson	0	0	7.27	6	0	0	8.2	12	7	7	4	7
Wander Suero	1	0	7.88	5	0	0	8.0	6	7	7	5	9
Tayler Scott	0	0	9.00	6	0	0	6.0	6	6	6	4	7
Dylan Covey	0	0	4.50	1	0	0	4.0	5	2	2	1	3
Tyson Miller	0	0	4.50	2	0	0	4.0	4	2	2	1	3
Daniel Hudson	0	0	0.00	3	0	1	3.0	2	0	0	3	5
Kyle Hurt	0	0	0.00	1	0	0	2.0	0	0	0	0	3
Tyler Cyr	0	0	0.00	2	0	0	1.2	1	0	0	0	2
Adam Kolarek	0	0	0.00	1	0	0	1.1	1	0	0	0	2
Jake Reed	0	0	81.00	1	0	0	0.2	5	6	6	1	1
**Totals**	100	62	4.06	162	162	44	1446.1	1284	699	652	454	1388

Note: No qualifiers for ERA title (162 IP).

== Awards and honors ==
Recipient	Award	Date awarded	Ref.
Max Muncy	National League Player of the Week Award (April 17–23)	April 24, 2023	
Clayton Kershaw	National League Pitcher of the Month Award (April)	May 3, 2023	
James Outman	National League Rookie of the Month Award (April)	May 3, 2023	
Freddie Freeman	National League Player of the Month Award (May)	June 2, 2023	
Mookie Betts	2023 Major League Baseball All-Star Game (Starter)	June 29, 2023	
Freddie Freeman	2023 Major League Baseball All-Star Game (Starter)	June 29, 2023	
J. D. Martinez	2023 Major League Baseball All-Star Game (Starter)	June 29, 2023	
Clayton Kershaw	2023 Major League Baseball All-Star Game	July 2, 2023	
Will Smith	2023 Major League Baseball All-Star Game	July 2, 2023	
Freddie Freeman	National League Player of the Week Award (July 31–August 6)	August 7, 2023	
Mookie Betts	National League Player of the Week Award (August 21–27)	August 28, 2023	
James Outman	National League Rookie of the Month Award (August)	September 3, 2023	
Mookie Betts	National League Player of the Month Award (August)	September 3, 2023	
Jason Heyward	Roy Campanella Award	September 23, 2023	
J. D. Martinez	National League Player of the Week Award (September 18–24)	September 25, 2023	
Mookie Betts	Multi-Positional Fielding Bible Award	October 26, 2023	
Mookie Betts	Silver Slugger Award (Outfield)	November 9, 2023	
Mookie Betts	All-MLB Team	December 16, 2023	
Freddie Freeman	All-MLB Team	December 16, 2023	

== Transactions ==
=== March ===
- On March 30, purchased the contract of OF Jason Heyward from AAA Oklahoma City, placed RHPs Tony Gonsolin, Daniel Hudson, Jimmy Nelson, Ryan Pepiot and Alex Reyes on the 15-day injured list and placed IF Gavin Lux on the 60-day injured list.

=== April ===
- On April 16, placed C Will Smith on the 7-day concussion injured list, transferred RHP Alex Reyes from the 15-day injured list to the 60-day injured list, and signed C Austin Wynns.
- On April 17, recalled LHP Justin Bruihl from AAA Oklahoma City and optioned RHP Andre Jackson to AAA Oklahoma City.
- On April 18, placed OF Mookie Betts on the paternity list, purchased the contract of IF/OF Luke Williams from AAA Oklahoma City and transferred RHP Daniel Hudson from the 15-day injured list to the 60-day injured list.
- On April 19, placed IF Miguel Rojas on the 10-day injured list with a strained left hamstring and recalled IF Yonny Hernández from AAA Oklahoma City.
- On April 20, activated OF Mookie Betts from the paternity list, optioned IF Yonny Hernández to AAA Oklahoma City, placed RHP Evan Phillips on the paternity list and recalled RHP Andre Jackson from AAA Oklahoma City.
- On April 21, placed RHP Michael Grove on the 15-day injured list with a strained right groin, purchased the contract of RHP Jake Reed from AAA Oklahoma City and transferred RHP Ryan Pepiot from the 15-day injured list to the 60-day injured list.
- On April 22, recalled LHP Victor González from AAA Oklahoma City and designated RHP Jake Reed for assignment.
- On April 25, activated RHP Evan Phillips from the paternity list, placed IF Max Muncy and RHP Brusdar Graterol on the paternity list and recalled IF Michael Busch from AAA Oklahoma City.
- On April 26, activated RHP Tony Gonsolin from the 15-day injured list and optioned RHP Andre Jackson to AAA Oklahoma City.
- On April 28, placed DH J. D. Martinez on the 10-day injured list with lower back tightness, activated C Will Smith from the 7-day concussion list, activated IF Max Muncy and RHP Brusdar Graterol from the paternity list, optioned LHP Justin Bruihl and IF Luke Williams to AAA Oklahoma City.

=== May ===
- On May 1, activated IF Miguel Rojas from the 10-day injured list and designed C Austin Wynns for assignment.
- On May 3, purchased the contract of RHP Gavin Stone from AAA Oklahoma City and optioned LHP Alex Vesia to AAA Oklahoma City.
- On May 5, purchased the contract of RHP Wander Suero from AAA Oklahoma City and optioned RHP Gavin Stone to AAA Oklahoma City.
- On May 9, placed LHP Caleb Ferguson on the paternity list and recalled LHP Justin Bruihl from AAA Oklahoma City.
- On May 12, activated DH J. D. Martinez from the 10-day injured list and LHP Caleb Ferguson from the paternity list, optioned IF Michael Busch and RHP Wander Suero to AAA Oklahoma City.
- On May 17, optioned LHP Justin Bruihl to AAA Oklahoma City, purchased the contract of RHP Dylan Covey from AAA Oklahoma City and transferred RHP Jimmy Nelson from the 15-day injured list to the 60-day injured list.
- On May 18, placed RHP Dustin May on the 15-day injured with a flexor pronator strain in his right elbow, recalled LHP Justin Bruihl and RHP Andre Jackson from AAA Oklahoma City and designated RHP Dylan Covey for assignment.
- On May 19, purchased the contract of RHP Tyler Cyr from AAA Oklahoma City and optioned RHP Andre Jackson to AAA Oklahoma City.
- On May 20, placed LHP Julio Urías on the 15-day injured list with a strained left hamstring and recalled RHP Wander Suero from AAA Oklahoma City.
- On May 22, placed LHP Clayton Kershaw on the bereavement list, recalled RHP Gavin Stone from AAA Oklahoma City, purchased the contract of RHP Tayler Scott from AAA Oklahoma City and designated RHP Wander Suero for assignment.
- On May 23, placed RHP Tyler Cyr on the 15-day injured list with right shoulder impingement, purchased the contract of RHP Bobby Miller from AAA Oklahoma City and transferred RHP Dustin May from the 15-day injured list to the 60-day injured list.
- On May 26, activated LHP Clayton Kershaw from the bereavement list and optioned RHP Tayler Scott to AAA Oklahoma City. Claimed RHP Zack Burdi off waivers from the Tampa Bay Rays and transferred RHP Tyler Cyr from the 15-day injured list to the 60-day injured list.
- On May 30, optioned RHP Gavin Stone to AAA Oklahoma City and recalled LHP Alex Vesia from AAA Oklahoma City.

=== June ===
- On June 1, acquired RHP Ricky Vanasco from the Texas Rangers in exchange for minor league pitcher Luis Valdez and designated RHP Zack Burdi for assignment.
- On June 3, activated RHP Michael Grove from the 15-day injured list and optioned LHP Justin Bruihl to AAA Oklahoma City. Placed RHP Phil Bickford on the 15-day injured list with lower back tightness and recalled RHP Tayler Scott from AAA Oklahoma City.
- On June 4, placed OF Trayce Thompson on the 10-day injured list with a left oblique strain and recalled OF Jonny DeLuca from AAA Oklahoma City.
- On June 5, IF Luke Williams was claimed on waivers by the Atlanta Braves.
- On June 6, optioned RHP Tayler Scott to AAA Oklahoma City and purchased the contract of RHP Nick Robertson from AAA Oklahoma City.
- On June 8, placed RHP Noah Syndergaard on the 15-day injured list with a blister on his right index finger and recalled RHP Tayler Scott from AAA Oklahoma City.
- On June 10, placed RHP Shelby Miller on the bereavement list and recalled RHP Andre Jackson from AAA Oklahoma City.
- On June 11, optioned RHP Andre Jackson to AAA Oklahoma City and purchased the contract of LHP Adam Kolarek from AAA Oklahoma City.
- On June 15, activated RHP Shelby Miller from the bereavement list and designated LHP Adam Kolarek for assignment.
- On June 16, placed IF Max Muncy on the 10-day injured list with a left hamstring strain, optioned RHP Michael Grove to AAA Oklahoma City, recalled IF Michael Busch from AAA Oklahoma City and purchased the contract of RHP Emmet Sheehan from AA Tulsa.
- On June 17, purchased the contract of LHP Bryan Hudson from AAA Oklahoma City and designated RHP Tayler Scott for assignment.
- On June 20, optioned LHP Bryan Hudson to AAA Oklahoma City, purchased the contract of RHP Ryan Brasier from AAA Oklahoma City and designated RHP Andre Jackson for assignment.
- On June 21, placed RHP Shelby Miller on the 15-day injured list with neck pain and recalled RHP Michael Grove from AAA Oklahoma City.
- On June 23, activated RHP Phil Bickford from the 15-day injured list and optioned LHP Alex Vesia to AAA Oklahoma City.
- On June 25, placed IF/OF Chris Taylor on the 10-day injured list with right knee soreness and recalled IF Yonny Hernández from AAA Oklahoma City.
- On June 27, activated IF Max Muncy from the 10-day injured list and optioned IF Michael Busch to AAA Oklahoma City.
- On June 29, optioned RHP Michael Grove to AAA Oklahoma City and recalled LHP Justin Bruihl from AAA Oklahoma City.
- On June 30, activated RHP Daniel Hudson from the 60-day injured list, optioned RHP Nick Robertson to AAA Oklahoma City and designated RHP Ricky Vanasco for assignment.

=== July ===
- On July 1, activated LHP Julio Urías from the 15-day injured list and optioned LHP Justin Bruihl to AAA Oklahoma City.
- On July 3, placed LHP Clayton Kershaw on the 15-day injured list with left shoulder inflammation, optioned LHP Victor González to AAA Oklahoma City and recalled RHP Gavin Stone and RHP Michael Grove to AAA Oklahoma City.
- On July 5, optioned RHP Gavin Stone to AAA Oklahoma City and recalled LHP Bryan Hudson from AAA Oklahoma City.
- On July 6, placed RHP Daniel Hudson on the 15-day injured list with a sprained MCL in his right knee, placed RHP Yency Almonte on the paternity list and recalled RHP Nick Robertson and LHP Alex Vesia from AAA Oklahoma City.
- On July 9, activated RHP Yency Almonte from the paternity list and optioned LHP Bryan Hudson and IF Miguel Vargas to AAA Oklahoma City.
- On July 12, acquired RHP Tyson Miller from the Milwaukee Brewers for cash considerations and transferred RHP Daniel Hudson from the 15-day injured list to the 60-day injured list.
- On July 14, activated IF/OF Chris Taylor from the 10-day injured list, optioned OF Jonny DeLuca to AAA Oklahoma City, signed OF Jake Marisnick as a free agent, transferred RHP Shelby Miller from the 15-day injured list to the 60-day injured list.
- On July 19, placed OF Jake Marisnick on the 10-day injured list with a left hamstring strain, optioned RHP Nick Robertson to AAA Oklahoma City and recalled LHP Justin Bruihl and OF Jonny DeLuca from AAA Oklahoma City.
- On July 25, acquired IF/OF Kiké Hernández from the Boston Red Sox in exchange for RHP Nick Robertson and minor league pitcher Justin Hagenman.
- On July 26, activated IF/OF Kiké Hernández, placed OF Jonny DeLuca on the 10-day injured list with a right hamstring strain, recalled RHP Tyson Miller from AAA Oklahoma City and optioned LHP Justin Bruihl to AAA Oklahoma City. Acquired SS Amed Rosario from the Cleveland Guardians in exchange for RHP Noah Syndergaard.
- On July 28, acquired RHPs Lance Lynn and Joe Kelly from the Chicago White Sox in exchange for OF Trayce Thompson and minor leaguers Nick Nastrini and Jordan Leasure. Designated IF Eddys Leonard and LHP Justin Bruihl for assignment. Activated SS Amed Rosario and opioned IF Yonny Hernández to AAA Oklahoma City.
- On July 29, activated RHP Joe Kelly and designated RHP Phil Bickford for assignment.
- On July 30, activated RHP Lance Lynn and optioned RHP Tyson Miller to AAA Oklahoma City.

=== August ===
- On August 1, acquired LHP Ryan Yarbrough from the Kansas City Royals for minor leaguers Devin Mann and Derlin Figueroa.
- On August 2, activated RHP Ryan Pepiot from the 60-day injured list and optioned him to AAA Oklahoma City, designated RHP Tyson Miller for assignment.
- On August 4, activated LHP Ryan Yarbrough and optioned RHP Emmet Sheehan to AAA Oklahoma City.
- On August 6, placed RHP Michael Grove on the 15-day injured list with tightness in his right lat and recalled LHP Bryan Hudson from AAA Oklahoma City.
- On August 8, optioned LHP Bryan Hudson to AAA Oklahoma City and recalled LHP Victor González from AAA Oklahoma City.
- On August 10, activated LHP Clayton Kershaw from the 15-day injured list and optioned LHP Victor González to AAA Oklahoma City.
- On August 12, placed RHP Yency Almonte on the 15-day injured list with a right knee sprain and recalled LHP Victor González from AAA Oklahoma City.
- On August 13, placed RHP Joe Kelly on the 15-day injured list with right forearm inflammation.
- On August 15, purchased the contract of RHP Gus Varland from AAA Oklahoma City and transferred OF Jake Marisnick from the 10-day injured list to the 60-day injured list.
- On August 19, placed RHP Tony Gonsolin on the 15-day injured list with right forearm inflammation and recalled LHP Bryan Hudson and RHP Ryan Pepiot from AAA Oklahoma City.
- On August 20, optioned RHP Ryan Pepiot to AAA Oklahoma City.
- On August 22, placed DH J. D. Martinez on the 10-day injured list with left groin tightness and recalled IF Michael Busch from AAA Oklahoma City.
- On August 27, recalled RHP Gavin Stone from AAA Oklahoma City and optioned LHP Bryan Hudson to AAA Oklahoma City. Claimed RHP Tyson Miller on waivers from the New York Mets and transferred RHP Tony Gonsolin from the 15-day injured list to the 60-day injured list.
- On August 28, activated RHP Tyson Miller and optioned RHP Gavin Stone to AAA Oklahoma City.
- On August 30, recalled RHP Ryan Pepiot from AAA Oklahoma City and designated RHP Tyson Miller for assignment.
- On August 31, activated RHP Shelby Miller from the 60-day injured list and optioned RHP Ryan Pepiot to AAA Oklahoma City. Activated OF Jonny DeLuca from the 10-day injured list and optioned him to AAA Oklahoma City.

=== September ===
- On September 1, recalled RHP Emmet Sheehan from AAA Oklahoma City, purchased the contract of IF Kolten Wong from AAA Oklahoma City and outrighted IF Yonny Hernández to AAA Oklahoma City.
- On September 6, placed LHP Julio Urías on administrative leave and recalled RHP Ryan Pepiot from AAA Oklahoma City.
- On September 8, activated DH J. D. Martinez from the 10-day injured list and optioned IF Michael Busch to AAA Oklahoma City.
- On September 10, placed RHP Gus Varland on the 15-day injured list with right knee inflammation and purchased the contract of RHP Wander Suero from AAA Oklahoma City.
- On September 11, placed RHP Wander Suero on the 15-day injured list with lower back tightness and recalled RHP Gavin Stone from AAA Oklahoma City.
- On September 12, optioned LHP Victor González to AAA Oklahoma City, transferred RHP Gus Varland from the 15-day injured list to the 60-day injured list and purchased the contract of RHP Kyle Hurt from AAA Oklahoma City.
- On September 13, activated RHP Joe Kelly from the 15-day injured list and optioned RHP Kyle Hurt to AAA Oklahoma City.
- On September 23, activated RHP Michael Grove from the 15-day injured list and optioned RHP Gavin Stone to AAA Oklahoma City.
- On September 26, activated RHP Wander Suero from the 15-day injured list and optioned him to AAA Oklahoma City.
- On September 30, placed RHP Lance Lynn on the bereavement list and recalled LHP Victor González from AAA Oklahoma City.

== Farm system ==
Level	Team	League	Manager	W	L	Position
AAA	Oklahoma City Dodgers	Pacific Coast League (East Division)	Travis Barbary	90	58	1st place Won League Championship
AA	Tulsa Drillers	Texas League (North Division)	Scott Hennessey	65	73	3rd place
High A	Great Lakes Loons	Midwest League (East Division)	Daniel Nava	76	55	1st place Lost in Championship Series
Low A	Rancho Cucamonga Quakes	California League (South Division)	John Shoemaker	71	61	1st place Lost Championship Series
Rookie	ACL Dodgers	Arizona Complex League (West Division)	Jair Fernandez	34	22	1st place Lost in playoffs
Foreign Rookie	DSL Dodgers Bautista	Dominican Summer League (Northwest Division)	Dunior Zerpa	42	11	1st place Won League Championship
Foreign Rookie	DSL Dodgers Mega	Dominican Summer League (Northwest Division)	Cordell Hipolito	36	17	2nd place Lost in playoffs

=== Minor League awards and honors ===
- All-Star Futures Game

Catcher Dalton Rushing

- Branch Ricky Minor League Players of the Year

Pitcher Kyle Hurt
Player Michael Busch

- MiLB All-Prospect Team

Designated hitter Michael Busch (first team)
Catcher Thayron Liranzo (second team)

- Pacific Coast League All-Stars

Pitcher Gavin Stone
Third baseman Michael Bush (also MVP and Top Prospect)

- Texas League All-Stars

Starting Pitcher Emmet Sheehan

- Midwest League All-Stars

Starting pitcher Justin Wrobleski
Utility player Taylor Young

- California League All-Stars

Relief Pitcher Lucas Wepf
Catcher Thayron Liranzo
Outfielder Chris Newell

- Baseball America Dodgers minor league player of the year

Michael Busch

== Major League Baseball draft ==
The 2023 Draft was held July 9–11, 2023. The Dodgers first round pick was dropped 10 spots as a result of their exceeding the competitive balance tax in 2022. They gained two compensation picks after the fourth round as a result of losing free agents Tyler Anderson and Trea Turner

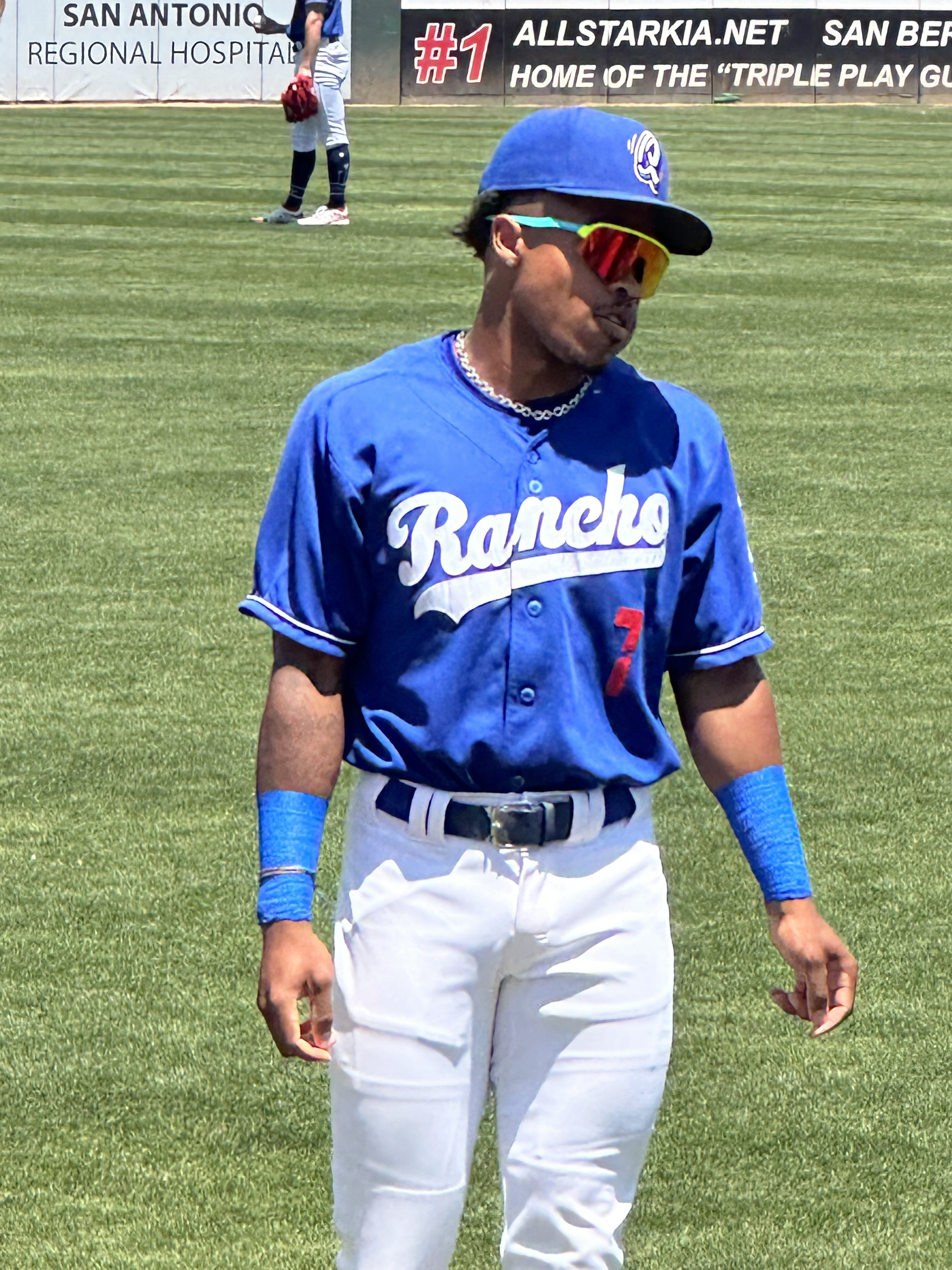
The Dodgers first pick was outfielder Kendall George from Atascocita High School in Humble, Texas

2023 draft picks

Round	Name	Position	School	Signed	Career span	Highest level
Comp A	Kendall George	OF	Atascocita High School	Yes	2023–present	AA
2	Jake Gelof	3B	University of Virginia	Yes	2023–present	AA
3	Brady Smith	RHP	Grainger High School	Yes	2025–present	A+
4	Wyatt Crowell	LHP	Florida State	Yes	2024–present	AA
FA Comp	Dylan Campbell	OF	University of Texas	Yes	2023–present	AA
FA Comp	Eriq Swan	RHP	Middle Tennessee State	Yes	2024–present	AA
5	Joe Vetrano	1B	Boston College	Yes	2023–present	AA
6	Bryan Gonzalez Garcia	SS	Carlos Beltran Baseball Academy	Yes	2023–present	A+
7	Patrick Copen	RHP	Marshall University	Yes	2023–present	AA
8	Jaron Elkins	OF	Goodpasture Christian School	Yes	2023–present	A+
9	Ryan Brown	RHP	Ball State	Yes	2025–present	A+
10	Sam Mongelli	SS	Sacred Heart University	Yes	2023–present	AA
11	Carson Hobbs	RHP	Samford University	Yes	2024–present	AA
12	Noah Ruen	RHP	Tyler Junior College	Yes	2023–present	A+
13	Alex Makarewich	RHP	Northwestern State	Yes	2024–present	A+
14	Jaxon Jelkin	RHP	South Mountain Community College	No		
15	Jordan Thompson	SS	Louisiana State	Yes	2023–present	A+
16	Javen Coleman	LHP	Louisiana State	No	2025–present	AAA
17	Luke Fox	LHP	Duke	Yes	2024–present	AA
18	Sterling Patick	LHP	South Hills High School	Yes	2024–present	A+
19	Spencer Green	RHP	Richland High School	Yes	2026–present	A
20	DJ Uiagalelei	TWP	Oregon State	No		
