= Yonny Hernández =

Yonny Hernández may refer to:

- Yonny Hernández (baseball) (born 1998), Venezuelan professional baseball infielder
- Yonny Hernández (motorcyclist) (born 1988), Colombian motorcycle racer
