= Emmet Sheehan =

American baseball player (born 1999)

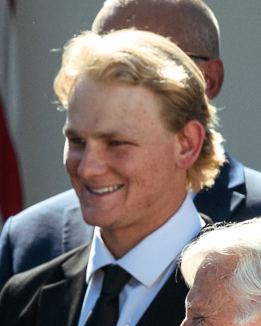
- Sheehan at the White House in 2026

Los Angeles Dodgers – No. 80
- Pitcher
- Born: November 15, 1999 (age 26); New York, New York, U.S.
- Bats: Right Throws: Right

MLB debut
- June 16, 2023, for the Los Angeles Dodgers

MLB statistics (through 2026 season)
- Win–loss record: 15–12
- Earned run average: 4.13
- Strikeouts: 285
- Stats at Baseball Reference

Teams
- Los Angeles Dodgers (2023, 2025–present)

Career highlights and awards
- World Series champion (2025)

George Emmet Sheehan (born November 15, 1999) is an American professional baseball pitcher for the Los Angeles Dodgers of Major League Baseball (MLB).

== Early life ==
Sheehan was born in New York City, but moved to Darien, Connecticut, when he was five years old.

== Career ==
=== Amateur career ===
Sheehan attended Fordham Preparatory School in the Bronx, New York, for three years before transferring to the Salisbury School in Salisbury, Connecticut. He attended Boston College and played college baseball for the Boston College Eagles for three seasons. As a junior, he went 5–5 with a 4.23 ERA and 106 strikeouts in 76 2/3 innings pitched. Sheehan pitched Collegiate summer baseball in the Futures Collegiate Baseball League for the Bristol Blues and New Britain Bees in 2018 and 2020 respectively. He was an FCBL All-Star in 2018. In 2019, Sheehan played in the New England Collegiate Baseball League for the Danbury Westerners where he was an All-Star.

=== Los Angeles Dodgers ===
The Los Angeles Dodgers selected Sheehan in the sixth round of the 2021 Major League Baseball draft. After signing with the team he was assigned to the Rookie-level Arizona Complex League Dodgers to start his professional career before being promoted to the Low-A Rancho Cucamonga Quakes and then a second time to the High-A Great Lakes Loons. Sheehan finished the season with a 3–0 record and a 5.17 ERA with 34 strikeouts in 15 2/3 innings pitched over seven appearances. He returned to Great Lakes to start the 2022 season. He appeared in 18 games (12 starts) for the Loons and then made two starts after a late season call-up to the Double-A Tulsa Drillers. He had a 7–2 record and 2.91 ERA between the two teams with 106 strikeouts.

Sheehan began 2023 with Tulsa, starting 10 games (12 total) with a 4–1 record and 1.86 ERA. He also struck out 88 batters in 53 1/3 innings. He was called up to the majors on June 16 to start against the San Francisco Giants. In his debut, he pitched six scoreless no-hit innings while allowing two walks and striking out three. His first major league strikeout was against Mike Yastrzemski. On June 23, Sheehan picked up his first major league win against the Houston Astros. He started 11 games (and two relief appearances) with a 4–1 record and a 4.92 ERA.

Sheehan was expected to compete for a spot in the Dodgers' rotation to start 2024, but was slowed in spring training by shoulder soreness and began the season on the injured list. On May 15, Sheehan underwent Tommy John surgery to repair the ulnar collateral ligament in his elbow, shutting him down for the rest of the season.

After a lengthy rehab, Sheehan rejoined the Dodgers rotation on June 18, 2025. He made 12 starts (and three relief appearances) during the 2025 season, with a 6–3 record and 2.82 ERA with 89 strikeouts. Sheehan was moved to the bullpen for the postseason. He struggled in his first appearance, in the Wild Card Series, allowing two runs on two hits and two walks while recording only one out. In the Division Series, he allowed two runs on four hits in three innings and in the 2025 World Series, he pitched four innings across three games, allowing three runs on seven hits and three walks.

Sheehan began the 2026 season as the fifth starter in the Dodgers rotation and he made 20 starts for them through the beginning of August. However, after the trade deadline acquisition of Tarik Skubal from the Detroit Tigers and a poor performance on August 2, where he allowed five runs in only 2 2/3 innings against the Boston Red Sox,. he was optioned to the minors the following day. Sheehan made four starts for the triple-A Oklahoma City Comets, allowing only three runs in 18 innings and was selected as the Pacific Coast League pitcher of the month for August. The Dodgers called him back up on September 7 for a start against the Cincinnati Reds, where he struck out 10 batters in 5 2/3 innings. After one more start, he was optioned back to Oklahoma City where he started for the Comets in the Triple-A National Championship Game against the Rochester Red Wings, allowing two runs in 5 1/3 innings. On the season, he made 22 starts for the Dodgers (and one relief appearance), with a 5–8 record and 4.57 ERA.
