= James Outman =

American baseball player (born 1997)

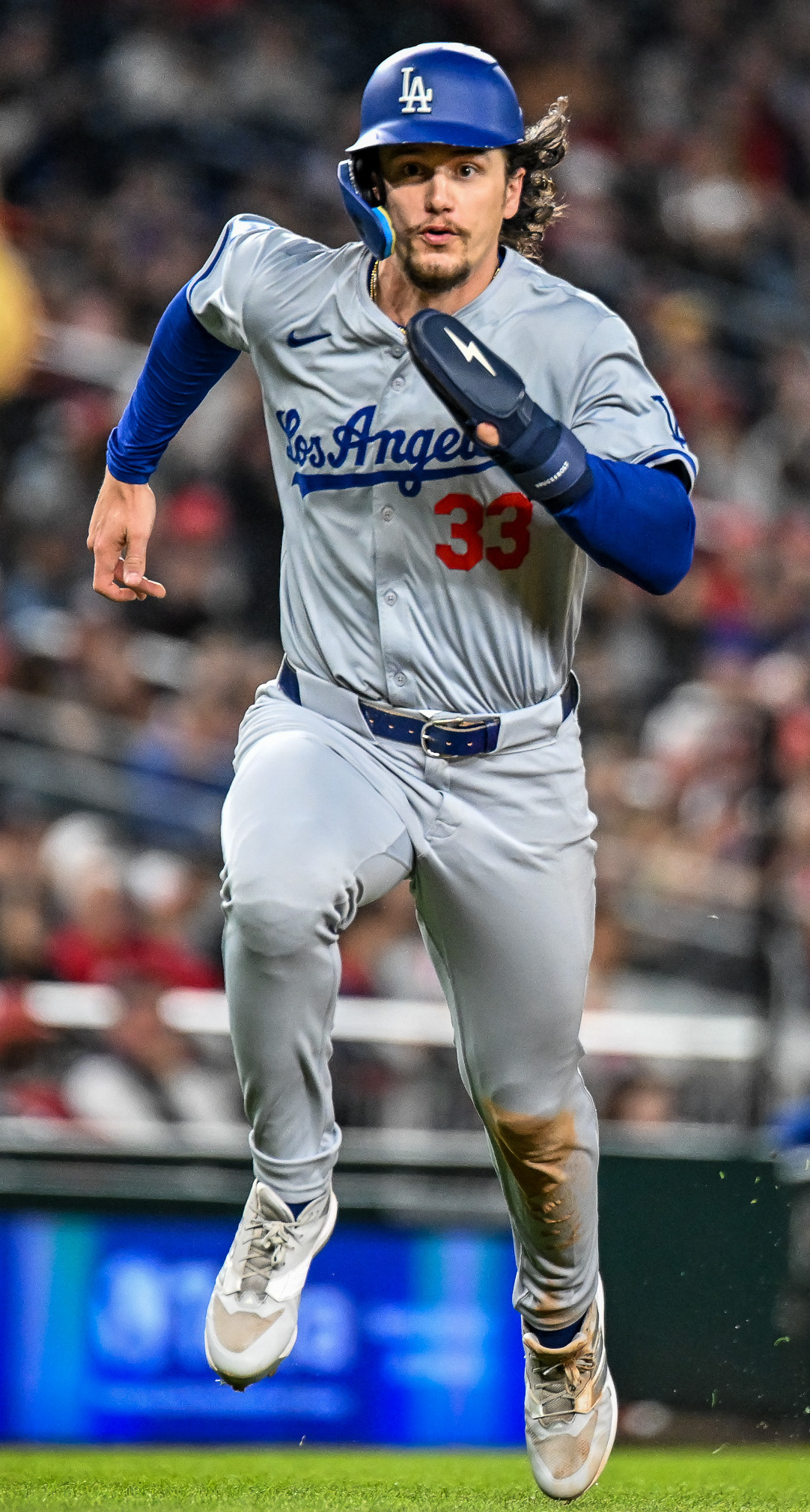
- Outman with the Los Angeles Dodgers in 2024

Free agent
- Outfielder
- Born: May 14, 1997 (age 29); Redwood City, California, U.S.
- Bats: Left Throws: Right

MLB debut
- July 31, 2022, for the Los Angeles Dodgers

MLB statistics (through 2026 season)
- Batting average: .207
- Home runs: 39
- Runs batted in: 112
- Stats at Baseball Reference

Teams
- Los Angeles Dodgers (2022–2025); Minnesota Twins (2025–2026); Detroit Tigers (2026)

James Matthew Outman (born May 14, 1997) is an American professional baseball outfielder who is a free agent. He has previously played in Major League Baseball (MLB) for the Los Angeles Dodgers, Minnesota Twins, and Detroit Tigers. He made his MLB debut in 2022.

== Early life ==
James Matthew Outman was born on May 14, 1997, in Redwood City, California. He attended Junípero Serra High School in San Mateo, California. In high school, he hit .305 with a .508 slugging percentage and .962 fielding percentage and also played linebacker and tight end for the football team. Outman was a fan of the San Francisco Giants growing up.

== College career ==
Outman attended California State University, Sacramento and played college baseball for the Sacramento State Hornets. He hit .249 in 147 games over three seasons with 23 homers and 99 RBI. He also played for the Humboldt Crabs in 2016 and the Bethesda Big Train of the Cal Ripken Collegiate Baseball League in 2017, where he was the Team MVP and League Offensive Player of the Year.

== Professional career ==
=== Los Angeles Dodgers ===
==== 2018–2021 ====
The Los Angeles Dodgers selected Outman in the seventh round of the 2018 MLB draft. He played with the Ogden Raptors in 2018 and the Great Lakes Loons in 2019. After missing the 2020 season as a result of the COVID-19 pandemic, Outman began 2021 with the Loons, where he hit .250 with nine home runs and 30 RBI. He was promoted to the Double-A Tulsa Drillers in July and was named Double-A Central hitter of the week two weeks later when he had seven extra base hits, including three home runs in six games against the Springfield Cardinals. He wound up hitting .289 with nine homers and 24 RBI in 39 games for Tulsa.

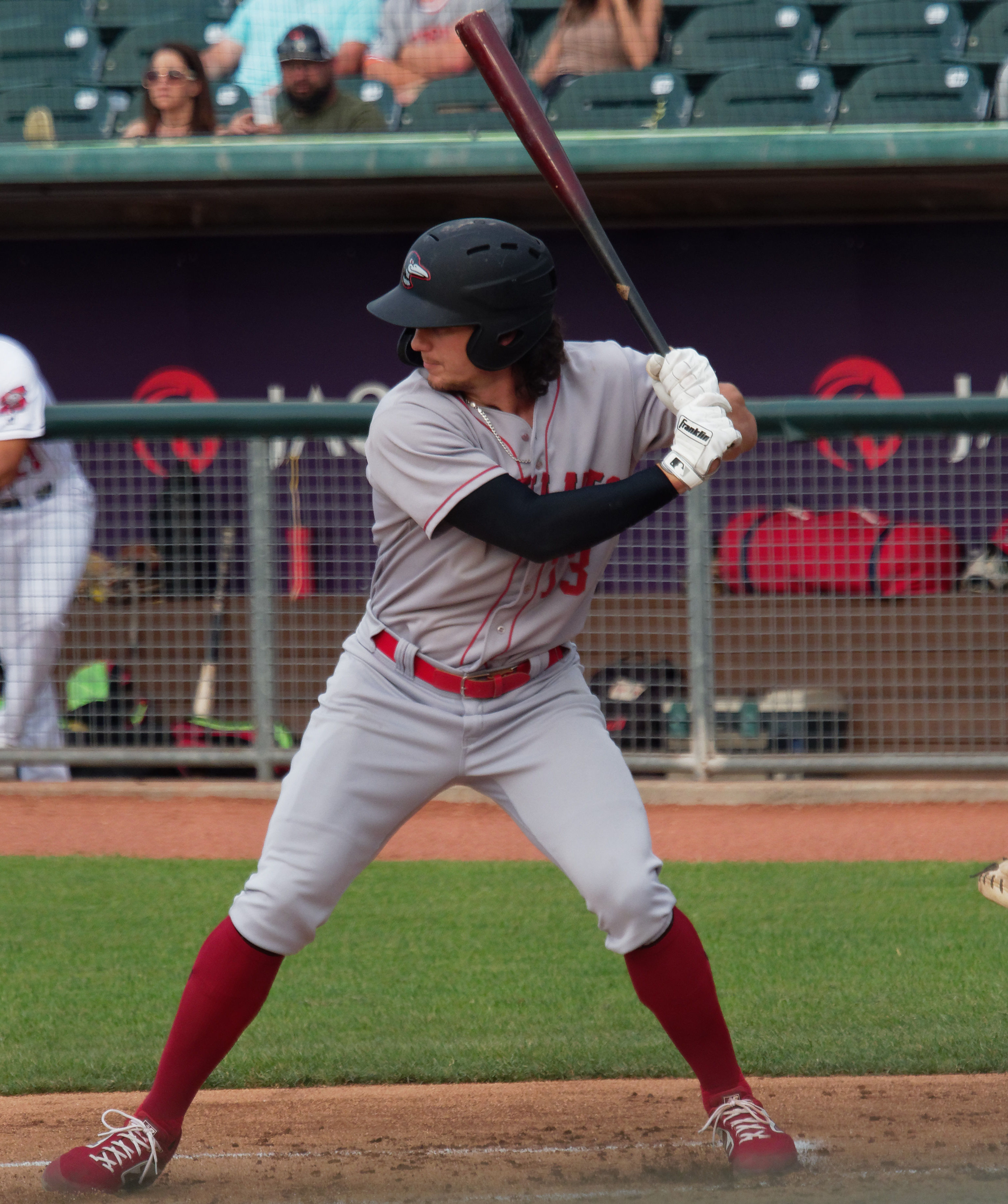
Outman with the Great Lakes Loons in 2021

The Dodgers assigned him to the Glendale Desert Dogs of the Arizona Fall League after the season, where he was selected to the Fall Stars Game for the best prospects in the league. Outman was added to the Dodgers' 40-man roster in November 2021. He began the 2022 season with Tulsa before being promoted to the Triple-A Oklahoma City Dodgers at the end of June. Between the two levels in 2022, he appeared in 125 games, hitting .294 with 31 homers and 106 RBIs.

==== 2022 ====
Outman was called up to the Major Leagues for the first time on July 30. He made his debut as the starting right fielder the following day against the Colorado Rockies and hit a home run in his first MLB at-bat off of Germán Márquez. He had three hits in his debut with the homer, a double and three RBI. After his second career game the following night, he became the first Dodgers player to reach base seven or more times in his first two career games since Casey Stengel in 1912. Outman appeared in four games in the majors in 2022, with six hits in 13 at-bats, including two doubles, the one home run and 13 RBI.

==== 2023 ====
Outman made the Dodgers opening day roster for the first time in 2023, as the team's starting center fielder against the Arizona Diamondbacks. He hit a two-run homer off Cole Sulser to give the Dodgers their first homer of the season. On April 20 against the Chicago Cubs, Outman hit two home runs including the go-ahead grand slam in the ninth. That was Outman's first multi-homer game, a feat that he repeated two days later when he hit another pair of home runs against the Cubs. Outman was selected as the National League Rookie of the Month for April. He played in 151 games, batting .248 with 23 home runs and 70 RBI.

==== 2024 ====
Outman again began the season as the Dodgers' center fielder. However, he struggled at the plate in the first couple of months, hitting just .147 with three home runs, and was optioned back to the minors on May 17. He spent most of the rest of the season in the minors, except for July, when he was recalled. He hit .147 with four home runs and 11 RBI in 53 games in the majors and .279 with 17 home runs and 46 RBI in 69 games in the minors.

==== 2025 ====
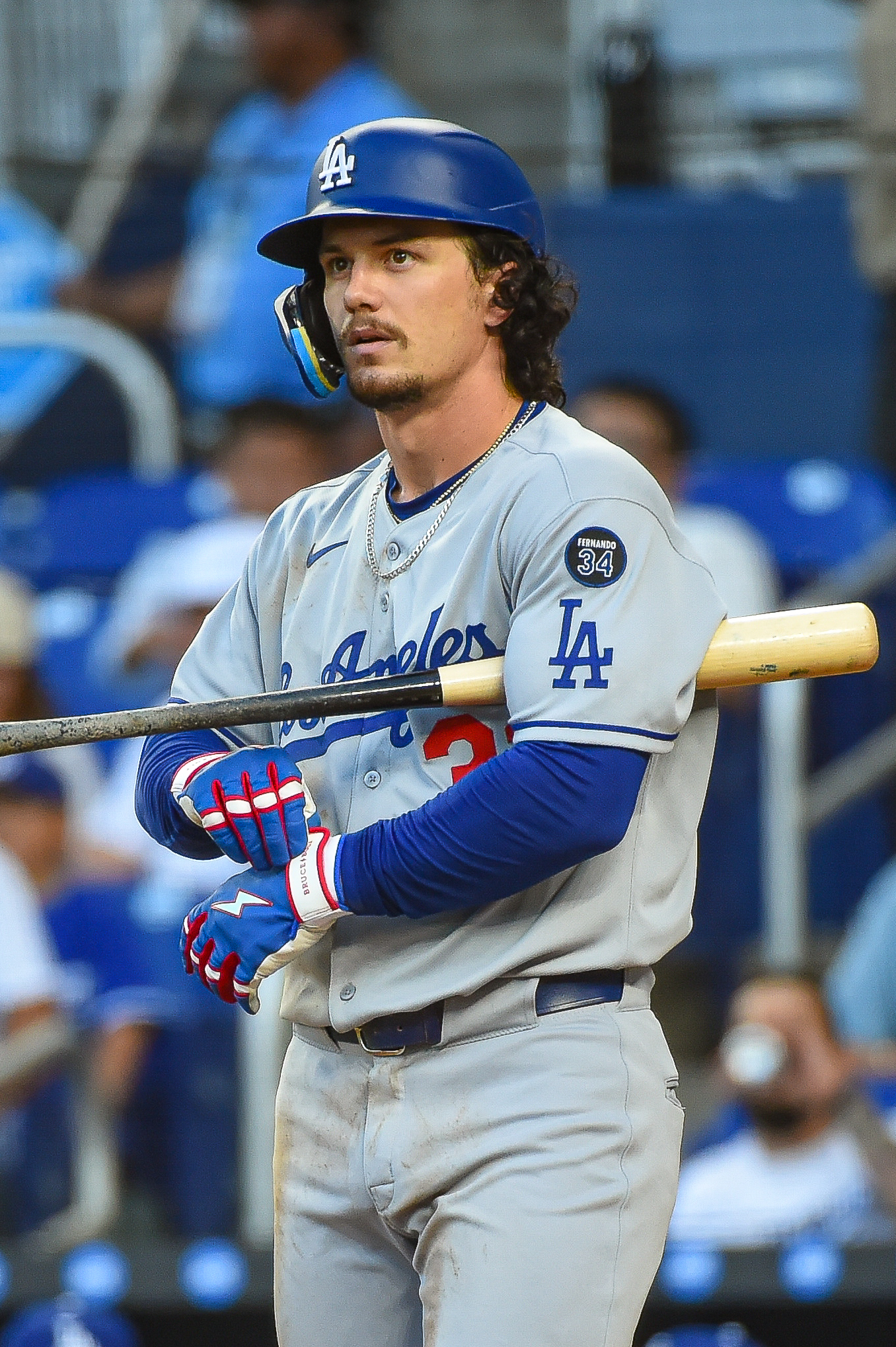
Outman with the Los Angeles Dodgers in 2025

Outman was on the roster for the Tokyo Series to open the season but did not appear in either of the two games and was optioned back to the Oklahoma City Comets to start the minor league season. In 70 games for Oklahoma City, Outman batted .289 with 20 homers and 74 RBI. He also played in 22 games for the Dodgers, but hit only .103 with two home runs and four RBI.

=== Minnesota Twins ===
On July 31, 2025, the Dodgers traded Outman to the Minnesota Twins in exchange for pitcher Brock Stewart. He made 37 appearances down the stretch for Minnesota, batting .147/.221/.337 with four home runs, seven RBI, and one stolen base.

Outman played in 49 contests for Minnesota in 2026, slashing .156/.229/.250 with three RBI and four stolen bases. On June 6, 2026, Outman was designated for assignment by the Twins.

=== Detroit Tigers ===
On June 11, 2026, Outman was claimed off of waivers by the Detroit Tigers. He made 45 appearances for Detroit, slashing .183/.240/.366 with five home runs, 14 RBI, and two stolen bases. On August 13, Outman was placed on the seven–day concussion list after being hit by a pitch. Outman completed a rehab assignment with the Triple–A Toledo Mud Hens, leading to his activation off of the concussion list on August 23; he was subsequently designated for assignment by Detroit. After clearing waivers, Outman was sent outright to Triple-A Toledo on August 25. He elected free agency on November 2.

== See also ==
- List of Major League Baseball players with a home run in their first major league at bat
