= Tyler Cyr =

American baseball player (born 1993)

- Pitcher
- Born: May 5, 1993 (age 33); Fremont, California, U.S.
- Batted: Right Threw: Right

MLB debut
- August 21, 2022, for the Philadelphia Phillies

Last MLB appearance
- May 20, 2023, for the Los Angeles Dodgers

MLB statistics
- Win–loss record: 1–0
- Earned run average: 2.40
- Strikeouts: 18
- Stats at Baseball Reference

Teams
- Philadelphia Phillies (2022); Oakland Athletics (2022); Los Angeles Dodgers (2023)

Tyler O'Neil Cyr (born May 5, 1993) is an American former professional baseball pitcher. He played in Major League Baseball (MLB) for the Philadelphia Phillies, Oakland Athletics, and Los Angeles Dodgers. He made his MLB debut in 2022 for the Phillies.

== Career ==
=== San Francisco Giants ===
Cyr attended John F. Kennedy High School in Fremont, California. He enrolled at Skyline College, where he played college baseball as a pitcher for one year before he transferred to Embry-Riddle Aeronautical University.

The San Francisco Giants selected Cyr in the 10th round of the 2015 Major League Baseball draft. He made his professional debut with the Arizona League Giants and was promoted to the Single-A Augusta GreenJackets during the season. In 2016, Cyr split the year between Augusta and the High-A San Jose Giants, registering a combined 5-4 record and 2.32 ERA with 89 strikeouts in 73.2 innings pitched across 39 appearances. In 2017, Cyr played for the Double-A Richmond Flying Squirrels, posting a 5-2 record and 2.19 ERA with 57 strikeouts in 49.1 innings of work. He worked primarily as the team’s closer, collecting 18 saves in 47 games. After the season, he played in the Arizona Fall League and was selected to play in the Fall Stars Game.

Cyr only pitched in 8 games in 2018, all for Double-A Richmond, due to injury. In 2019, he spent the year with Richmond, also appearing in one game for the Triple-A Sacramento River Cats at the end of the season. In 37 games for the Flying Squirrels, Cyr posted a 2.05 ERA with 57 strikeouts and 5 saves in 48.1 innings pitched. Cyr did not play in a game in 2020 due to the cancellation of the minor league season because of the COVID-19 pandemic.

Cyr spent the 2021 campaign with Triple-A Sacramento. In 32 appearances (including two starts), he pitched to a 3-0 record and 4.91 ERA with 49 strikeouts in 36.2 innings of work. He elected free agency following the season on November 7, 2021.

=== Philadelphia Phillies ===
On December 10, 2021, Cyr signed a minor league contract with the Philadelphia Phillies organization. He was assigned to the Triple-A Lehigh Valley IronPigs to begin the 2022 season. He appeared in 35 games for Lehigh, pitching to a 2-3 record and 2.50 ERA with 37 strikeouts and 6 saves in 36.0 innings of work.

The Phillies promoted Cyr to the major leagues for the first time on August 21, 2022. He made his major league debut that day, allowing a home run to New York Mets outfielder Brandon Nimmo. He was designated for assignment the next day.

=== Oakland Athletics ===
On August 24, 2022, Cyr was claimed off waivers by the Oakland Athletics and was assigned to the Triple-A Las Vegas Aviators. Cyr made 11 appearances for Oakland down the stretch, collecting his first major league win as he posted a 2.08 ERA with 16 strikeouts in 13.0 innings pitched.

On January 13, 2023, Cyr was designated for assignment by Las Vegas. He was released on January 17.

=== Los Angeles Dodgers ===
On January 21, 2023, Cyr signed a minor league contract with the Los Angeles Dodgers organization. He was assigned to the Triple-A Oklahoma City Dodgers to start the season and made 15 appearances, posting a 4.86 ERA with 24 strikeouts in 16 2/3 innings. On May 19, he was called up to the majors. Cyr made two scoreless appearances for the Dodgers before he was placed on the injured list with a right shoulder impingement. He was transferred to the 60-day injured list on May 26. Following the season on October 31, the Dodgers removed Cyr from the 40–man roster and sent him outright to Triple–A. He elected free agency on November 6.

On January 24, 2025, Cyr announced his retirement from professional baseball.
