= Nick Robertson (baseball) =

American baseball player (born 1998)

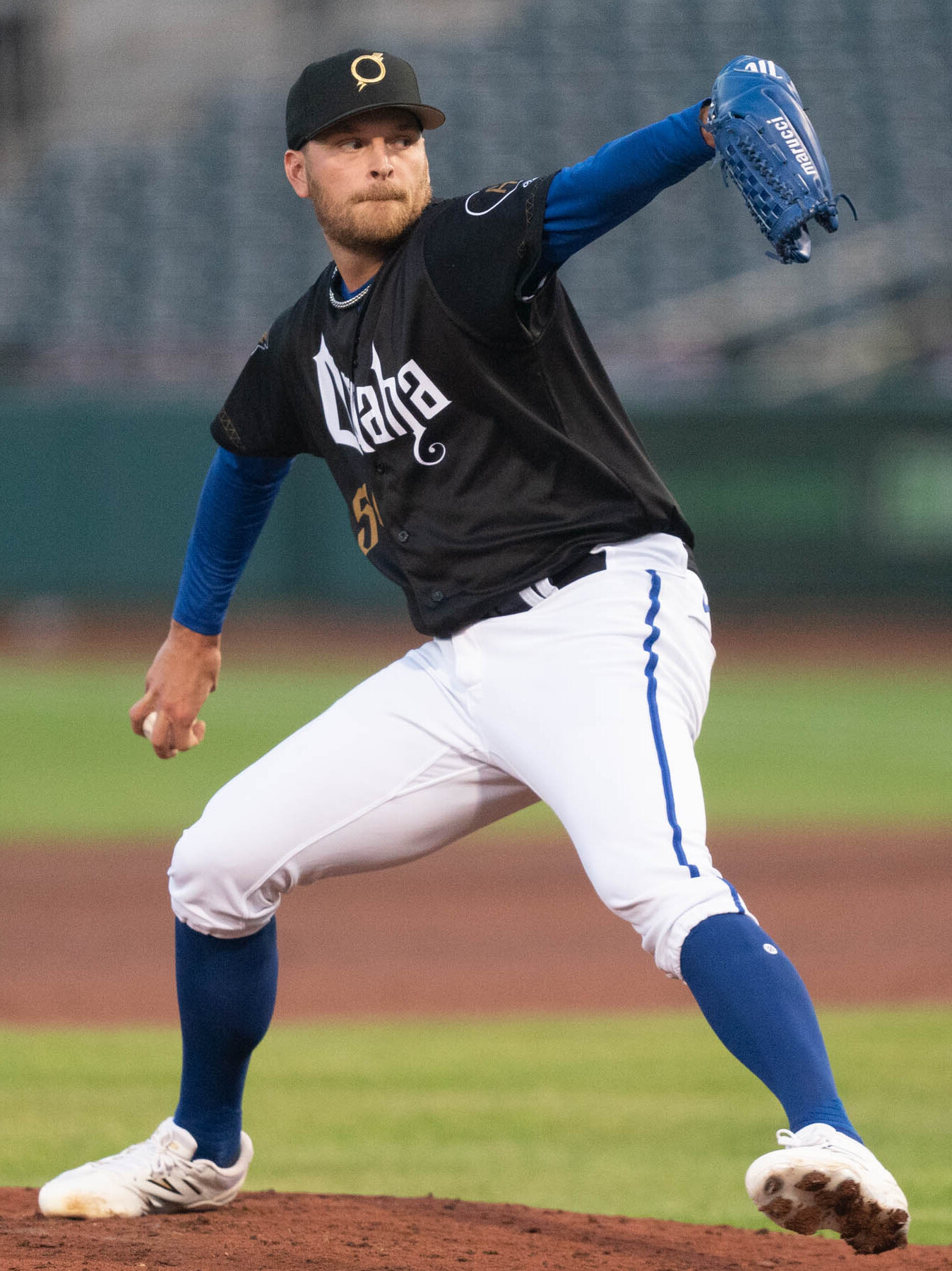
- Robertson with the Omaha Storm Chasers in 2025

Free agent
- Pitcher
- Born: July 16, 1998 (age 28); Roanoke, Virginia, U.S.
- Bats: Right Throws: Right

MLB debut
- June 7, 2023, for the Los Angeles Dodgers

MLB statistics (through 2024 season)
- Win–loss record: 0–1
- Earned run average: 5.30
- Strikeouts: 40
- Stats at Baseball Reference

Teams
- Los Angeles Dodgers (2023); Boston Red Sox (2023); St. Louis Cardinals (2024); Toronto Blue Jays (2024)

Nicholas Parker Robertson (born July 16, 1998) is an American professional baseball pitcher who is a free agent. He has previously played in Major League Baseball (MLB) for the Dodgers, Boston Red Sox, St. Louis Cardinals, and Toronto Blue Jays.

== Career ==
=== Amateur ===
Robertson attended Franklin County High School in Rocky Mount, Virginia, and James Madison University, where he played college baseball for the James Madison Dukes.

=== Los Angeles Dodgers ===
The Los Angeles Dodgers selected Robertson in the 7th round, with the 221st overall selection, of the 2019 Major League Baseball draft. Robertson spent his first professional season with the rookie-level Arizona League Dodgers and Ogden Raptors. He did not play in a game in 2020 due to the cancellation of the minor league season because of the COVID-19 pandemic.

In 2021, Robertson was invited to spring training by the Dodgers. He played the 2021 season with the Double-A Tulsa Drillers, where he was 2–4 with a 4.30 earned run average (ERA) in 39 games while striking out 63 in 58 2/3 innings. In 2022, he pitched in 44 games for Tulsa and nine for the Triple-A Oklahoma City Dodgers, with a combined 4.43 ERA.

He began the 2023 season with Oklahoma City, making 24 appearances and logging a 2.13 ERA with 37 strikeouts and seven saves in 25 1/3 innings pitched. On June 6, 2023, Robertson was selected to the 40-man roster and promoted to the major leagues for the first time. He made his major league debut against the Cincinnati Reds on June 7, pitching two scoreless innings with three strikeouts. His first MLB strikeout was of Elly De La Cruz. He pitched 10 1/3 innings over nine games, allowing seven earned runs for a 6.10 ERA.

=== Boston Red Sox ===
On July 25, 2023, the Dodgers traded Robertson and Justin Hagenman to the Boston Red Sox for Kiké Hernández. He was activated by Boston on August 6, and optioned to the Triple-A Worcester Red Sox on August 9. He was later recalled to Boston twice during September.

=== St. Louis Cardinals ===
On December 8, 2023, Robertson was traded to the St. Louis Cardinals, along with Victor Santos, in exchange for Tyler O'Neill. He was optioned to the Triple-A Memphis Redbirds to begin the 2024 season. In eight games for St. Louis, Robertson posted a 4.38 ERA with 14 strikeouts over 12 1/3 innings pitched. He was designated for assignment by the Cardinals on August 11, 2024.

=== Los Angeles Angels ===
On August 13, 2024, Robertson was claimed off waivers by the Los Angeles Angels. In 10 games for the Triple–A Salt Lake Bees, he struggled to a 6.92 ERA with 17 strikeouts over 13 innings. Robertson was designated for assignment by the Angels on September 15.

=== Toronto Blue Jays ===
On September 17, 2024, Robertson was claimed off waivers by the Toronto Blue Jays. He made one appearance for Toronto, tossing a scoreless frame against the Miami Marlins.

Robertson was optioned to the Triple-A Buffalo Bisons to begin the 2025 season. He was designated for assignment by Toronto on March 27, 2025.

=== Houston Astros ===
On April 1, 2025, Robertson was traded to the Houston Astros in exchange for Edinson Batista. In 31 appearances for the Triple-A Sugar Land Space Cowboys, he logged a 1–2 record and 4.68 ERA with 36 strikeouts and three saves across 32 2/3 innings pitched. Robertson was designated for assignment by Houston on July 25. He cleared waivers and was sent outright to Triple-A Sugar Land on August 1. Robertson was released by the Astros organization on August 12.

=== Kansas City Royals ===
On August 12, 2025, Robertson signed a minor league contract with the Kansas City Royals organization. He made nine appearances for the Triple-A Omaha Storm Chasers, logging a 1-0 record and 4.41 ERA with 14 strikeouts and one save across 16 1/3 innings pitched. Robertson elected free agency following the season on November 6.

=== Los Angeles Dodgers (second stint) ===
On January 16, 2026, Robertson signed a minor league contract to return to the Dodgers. He was assigned to Tulsa to begin the season. He split the season between Tulsa and Oklahoma City, appearing in a total of 46 games, pitching 55 2/3 innings with a 1.78 ERA. He elected free agency on November 2.
