= Michael Grove =

American baseball player (born 1996)

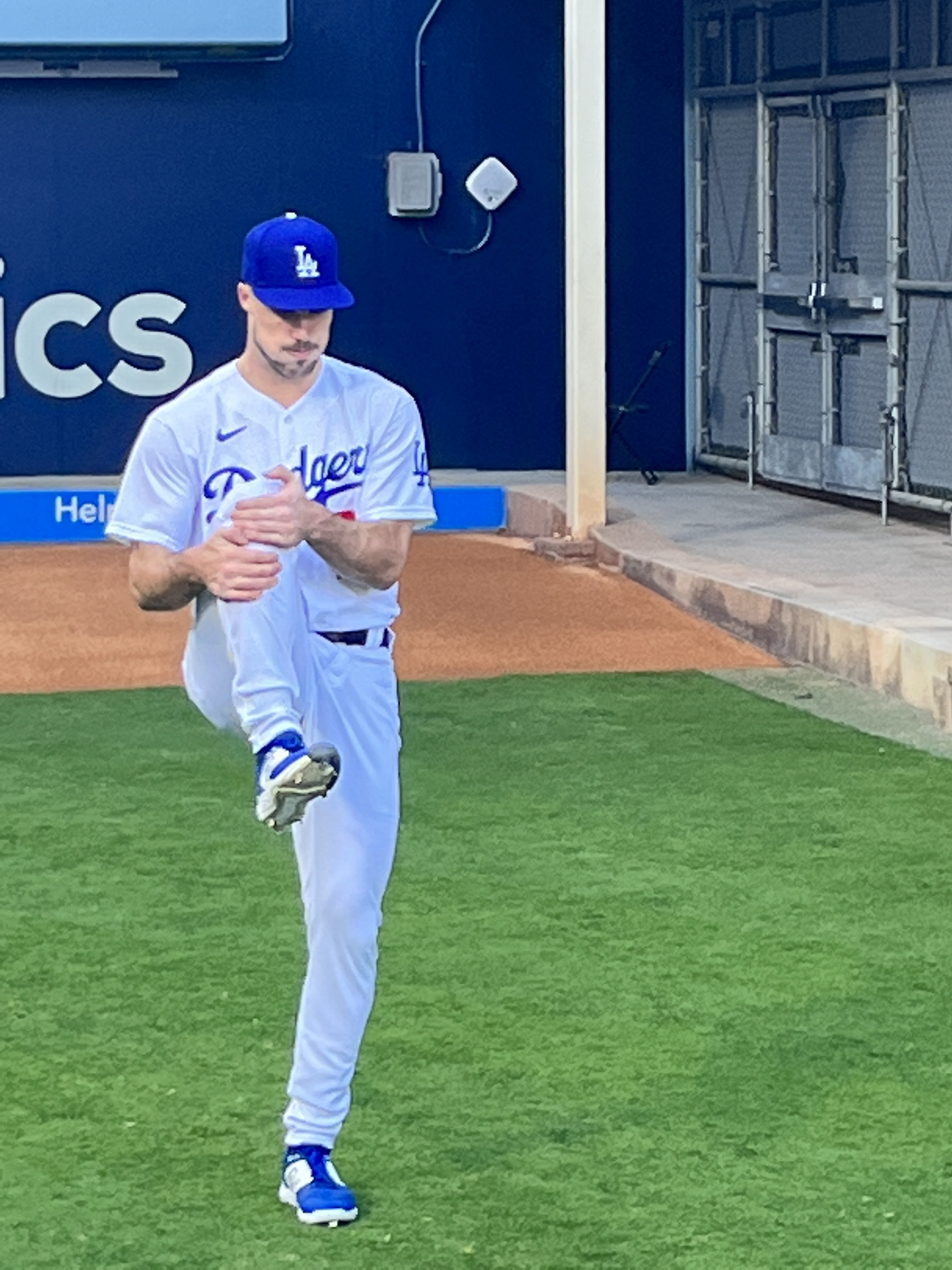
- Grove with the Los Angeles Dodgers

Free agent
- Pitcher
- Born: December 18, 1996 (age 29); Wheeling, West Virginia, U.S.
- Bats: Right Throws: Right

MLB debut
- May 15, 2022, for the Los Angeles Dodgers

MLB statistics (through 2026 season)
- Win–loss record: 8–7
- Earned run average: 5.47
- Strikeouts: 157
- Stats at Baseball Reference

Teams
- Los Angeles Dodgers (2022–2024); Tampa Bay Rays (2026)

Michael Alexander Grove (born December 18, 1996) is an American professional baseball pitcher who is a free agent. He has previously played in Major League Baseball (MLB) for the Los Angeles Dodgers and Tampa Bay Rays. He was drafted by the Dodgers in the second round of the 2018 MLB draft out of West Virginia University and he made his MLB debut in 2022.

== Amateur career ==
Grove played hockey, baseball and football at Wheeling Park High School in West Virginia. He then played college baseball at West Virginia University. As a sophomore in 2017, he had a 2.87 ERA with 61 strikeouts in 47 innings before his season ended because of an arm injury. He underwent Tommy John surgery in May 2017.

== Professional career ==
=== Los Angeles Dodgers ===
Despite the injury, Grove was selected in the second round of the 2018 MLB draft by the Los Angeles Dodgers, though he did not play in a professional game until 2019 when he made 21 starts for the Rancho Cucamonga Quakes. The 2020 season minor league season was cancelled because of the COVID-19 pandemic, but Grove was added to the player pool and trained at the alternate site at the University of Southern California. He played in 21 games for the Tulsa Drillers in 2021, where he was 1–4 with a 7.86 ERA in 21 games (19 starts).

On November 19, 2021, the Dodgers added Grove to their 40-man roster to protect him from the Rule 5 draft. After beginning the 2022 season with Tulsa, Grove was promoted to the major leagues to make his debut as the starting pitcher against the Philadelphia Phillies on May 15, 2022. He pitched 3 2/3 innings in his debut, allowing four hits while walking three and striking out three. Four unearned runs scored off him and his first MLB strikeout was of Alec Bohm. On September 25, Grove picked up his first major league win against the St. Louis Cardinals. He made seven appearances in the majors, making six starts with one relief appearance. He allowed 15 earned runs in 29 1/3 innings for a 4.60 ERA. He also pitched in 19 games (17 starts) in the minors between Tulsa and the Triple-A Oklahoma City Dodgers, with a 1–5 record and 3.79 ERA.

In 2023, he pitched in 18 games in the majors, with 12 starts, and a 2–3 record with 6.13 ERA and 73 strikeouts. In 2024, Grove became a full-time relief pitcher, making 39 appearances in the majors with a 4–4 record, 55 strikeouts, and a 5.12 ERA He also pitched 10 games for the Triple-A Oklahoma City Baseball Club, posting a 2–0 record and 1.59 ERA with 11 strikeouts across 11 1/3 innings pitched. Grove pitched in one game in the NLDS, recording one strikeout and allowing a home run. He suffered a shoulder injury in that game and was removed from the postseason roster.

Grove underwent right shoulder labrum surgery during spring training before the 2025 season, and it was announced that he would miss the entire season while recovering. He was removed from the 40-man roster and sent outright to Triple-A Oklahoma City on November 6, 2025. Grove elected free agency the same day.

=== Tampa Bay Rays ===
On April 14, 2026, Grove signed a major league contract with the Tampa Bay Rays; he was subsequently placed on the 15-day in injured list due to his continued recovery from surgery. He was transferred to the 60-day injured list on April 20. On June 21, Grove was activated and optioned to the Triple-A Durham Bulls. He made three appearances for Tampa Bay, logging a 1–0 record and 5.14 ERA with six strikeouts over seven innings of work. Grove was designated for assignment by the Rays on September 12.

=== Atlanta Braves ===
On September 15, 2026, Grove was claimed off of waivers by the Atlanta Braves. On November 20, he was non-tendered by the Braves and became a free agent.
