= Justin Bruihl =

American baseball player (born 1997)

St. Louis Cardinals – No. 47
- Pitcher
- Born: June 26, 1997 (age 29); Petaluma, California, U.S.
- Bats: Left Throws: Left

MLB debut
- August 8, 2021, for the Los Angeles Dodgers

MLB statistics (through 2026 season)
- Win–loss record: 3–3
- Earned run average: 4.25
- Strikeouts: 122
- Stats at Baseball Reference

Teams
- Los Angeles Dodgers (2021–2023); Colorado Rockies (2023); Pittsburgh Pirates (2024); Toronto Blue Jays (2025); St. Louis Cardinals (2026–present)

Justin Bruihl (/ˈbruːl/ BROOL; born June 26, 1997) is an American professional baseball pitcher for the St. Louis Cardinals of Major League Baseball (MLB). He has previously played in MLB for the Los Angeles Dodgers, Colorado Rockies, Pittsburgh Pirates, and Toronto Blue Jays.

== Early life and amateur career ==
Bruihl was born and grew up in Petaluma, California and attended Casa Grande High School. He tore the ulnar collateral ligament in his pitching elbow early in his junior season and had Tommy John surgery. Bruihl returned to pitching in the second half of his senior year but was limited to 17 1/3 innings pitched, striking out 27 batters and allowing no earned runs.

Bruihl enrolled at California Polytechnic State University, San Luis Obispo, where he played college baseball for the Cal Poly Mustangs. He led the team with 25 appearances as a freshman and had a 1–3 win–loss record with a 4.88 earned run average (ERA) and 27 strikeouts over 31 1/3 innings pitched. After the season, he transferred to Santa Rosa Junior College and posted a 7–0 record and 2.12 ERA with 59 strikeouts over 51 innings pitched in his sophomore season. Bruihl had committed to transfer to the University of California after the end of his sophomore season.

== Professional career ==
=== Los Angeles Dodgers ===
Bruihl was signed by the Los Angeles Dodgers as an undrafted free agent on July 15, 2017. He was assigned to the Ogden Raptors of the Pioneer League the following season to begin his professional career. Bruihl began the 2019 season with the High–A Rancho Cucamonga Quakes before being reassigned to the Single–A Great Lakes Loons. He did not play in a game in 2020 due to the cancellation of the minor league season because of the COVID-19 pandemic.

After beginning the 2021 season with the Double-A Tulsa Drillers, Bruihl was promoted to the Triple-A Oklahoma City Dodgers on June 1, 2021. The Dodgers selected Bruihl's contract and promoted him the Major League roster on August 8, 2021. He made his major league debut the same day against the Los Angeles Angels, striking out the first batter he faced (Brandon Marsh) and pitching 1 2/3 innings. He pitched in 18 2/3 innings for the Dodgers in 2021 over 21 games and allowed six earned runs (2.89 ERA) on 13 hits. He also made 26 appearances in the minors (eight for Tulsa and 18 for Oklahoma City) where he had a 2.63 ERA. Bruihl was left off the postseason roster for the first two rounds but added for the 2021 National League Championship Series, where he pitched two scoreless innings allowing only one hit while striking out five batters.

In 2022, Bruihl split the season between the majors and the minors. He pitched in 25 games for Oklahoma City with a 3–1 record and 3.56 ERA and in 24 games for Los Angeles, with a 1–1 record and 3.80 ERA. On September 18, he picked up his first career save against the San Francisco Giants. Bruihl was optioned to Triple-A Oklahoma City to begin the 2023 season. In 20 games for Los Angeles, he worked to a 4.07 ERA with 19 strikeouts in 24 1/3 innings pitched. On July 28, 2023, Bruihl was designated for assignment.

=== Colorado Rockies ===
On August 1, 2023, Bruihl was traded to the Colorado Rockies in exchange for cash considerations. In 7 appearances for Colorado, he struggled to a 14.73 ERA with 3 strikeouts across 3 2/3 innings of work. On August 25, Bruihl was designated for assignment following the promotion of Evan Justice. He cleared waivers and was sent outright to the Triple–A Albuquerque Isotopes on August 28. Bruihl elected free agency following the season on November 6.

=== Cincinnati Reds ===
On January 3, 2024, Bruihl signed a minor league contract with the Cincinnati Reds. In 19 games for the Triple–A Louisville Bats, he recorded a 2.31 ERA with 24 strikeouts across 23 1/3 innings pitched. On June 3, Bruihl was released by the Reds organization.

=== Pittsburgh Pirates ===
On June 6, 2024, Bruihl signed a major league contract with the Pittsburgh Pirates. In 7 games for the Pirates, he struggled to a 9.53 ERA with 5 strikeouts across 5 2/3 innings pitched. On July 7, Bruihl was designated for assignment by Pittsburgh. He cleared waivers and was sent outright to the Triple–A Indianapolis Indians on July 9. Bruihl elected free agency on October 2.

=== Toronto Blue Jays ===
On March 16, 2025, Bruihl signed a minor league contract with the Toronto Blue Jays. In 25 appearances for the Triple-A Buffalo Bisons, he posted a 3–3 record and 3.81 ERA with 36 strikeouts and two saves across 28 1/3 innings pitched. On June 17, the Blue Jays selected Bruihl's contract, adding him to their active roster. He was optioned to Buffalo on August 30. In 15 appearances for Toronto, Bruihl recorded a 5.27 ERA with 18 strikeouts across 13 2/3 innings pitched. On December 15, Bruihl was designated for assignment by Toronto following the signing of Tyler Rogers.

=== St. Louis Cardinals ===
On December 17, 2025, Bruihl was traded to the Cleveland Guardians in exchange for cash considerations. He was designated for assignment following the signing of Shawn Armstrong on December 20.

On January 6, 2026, Bruihl was traded to the St. Louis Cardinals in exchange for cash considerations.
