= Kyle Hurt =

American baseball player (born 1998)

Los Angeles Dodgers – No. 63
- Pitcher
- Born: May 30, 1998 (age 28); Rancho Santa Fe, California, U.S.
- Bats: Right Throws: Right

MLB debut
- September 12, 2023, for the Los Angeles Dodgers

MLB statistics (through 2026 season)
- Win–loss record: 4–2
- Earned run average: 3.64
- Strikeouts: 64
- Stats at Baseball Reference

Teams
- Los Angeles Dodgers (2023–2024, 2026–present)

Kyle Dillon Hurt (born May 30, 1998) is an American professional baseball pitcher for the Los Angeles Dodgers of Major League Baseball (MLB). He made his MLB debut in 2023.

== Amateur career ==
Hurt attended Torrey Pines High School in San Diego, California, where he played baseball. For his high school career, he had a 1.51 ERA and 187 strikeouts. He missed time during his senior season in 2017 due to a knee injury, and went unselected in the 2017 Major League Baseball draft.

Hurt enrolled at the University of Southern California (USC), where he played three seasons of college baseball for the USC Trojans. In 2018, he played collegiate summer baseball in the Cape Cod Baseball League with the Chatham Anglers. He ended his collegiate career with a 9–13 record, a 5.06 ERA and 170 strikeouts over 172 2/3 innings pitched.

== Professional career ==
=== Miami Marlins ===
The Miami Marlins selected Hurt in the fifth round, with the 134th overall selection, of the shortened 2020 Major League Baseball draft. He signed for $300,000. Hurt did not play in a game in 2020 due to the cancellation of the minor league season because of the COVID-19 pandemic.

=== Los Angeles Dodgers ===
On February 12, 2021, the Marlins traded Hurt and Alex Vesia to the Los Angeles Dodgers in exchange for Dylan Floro. He split his first professional season between the Arizona League Dodgers and the Rancho Cucamonga Quakes, going 2–2 with a 5.57 ERA over 21 innings pitched. After the season, he played in the Arizona Fall League with the Glendale Desert Dogs. He opened the 2022 season with the Great Lakes Loons and was promoted to the Tulsa Drillers in early July. Between the two levels, he pitched in 25 games (19 starts) and finished with a 5–7 record, a 5.27 ERA, and 109 strikeouts over 71 2/3 innings. He returned to Tulsa to open the 2023 season. In early August, he was promoted to the Oklahoma City Dodgers. Between Tulsa and Oklahoma City in 2023, he appeared in 26 games (16 starts) with a 4–4 record, 3.91 ERA and 152 strikeouts in 92 innings. He was selected as the Dodgers 2023 Minor League Pitcher of the Year.

On September 12, 2023, Hurt's contract was purchased to the 40-man roster and he was promoted to the major leagues for the first time. In his debut later that day, he pitched two innings of relief against the San Diego Padres, retiring three players on nine pitches in the eighth inning and striking out the side in the ninth. His first MLB strikeout was of Garrett Cooper.

Hurt began the 2024 season out of the Dodgers' bullpen, where he made three appearances and logged a 1.35 ERA. On April 20, 2024, he was placed on the injured list with right shoulder inflammation. He was activated from the injured list on June 21 and optioned to Triple-A, where he pitched 14 2/3 innings over 13 games, with two starts, and allowed five earned runs on nine hits for a 3.07 ERA. On July 24, it was announced that Hurt would undergo Tommy John surgery, and miss the remainder of the season. He returned late in the 2025 season to pitch in seven rehab appearances for Oklahoma City (allowing two runs in 9 1/3 innings) but did not appear in the majors.

Hurt returned to Oklahoma City to begin the 2026 season but was recalled to the Dodgers on April 13. On May 25, Hurt recorded his first career win after allowing one run in one inning of relief against the Colorado Rockies. He pitched in 44 games for the Dodgers, working 45 2/3 innings with a 4–1 record, 4.14 ERA and 58 strikeouts, while also recording his first MLB save against the Rockies on May 27. Hurt also pitched 11 innings over 13 games for the Oklahoma City Comets, allowing nine runs on 13 hits.
