= Yonny Hernández (baseball) =

Venezuelan baseball player (born 1998)

Sultanes de Monterrey – No. 29
- Infielder
- Born: May 4, 1998 (age 28); Maturín, Venezuela
- Bats: Switch Throws: Right

MLB debut
- August 5, 2021, for the Texas Rangers

MLB statistics (through 2023 season)
- Batting average: .190
- Home runs: 0
- Runs batted in: 10
- Stats at Baseball Reference

Teams
- Texas Rangers (2021); Arizona Diamondbacks (2022); Los Angeles Dodgers (2023)

Yonny José Hernández (born May 4, 1998) is a Venezuelan professional baseball infielder for the Sultanes de Monterrey of the Mexican League. He has previously played in Major League Baseball (MLB) for the Texas Rangers, Arizona Diamondbacks, and Los Angeles Dodgers.

== Professional career ==
=== Texas Rangers ===
Hernández signed with the Texas Rangers as an international free agent in 2014 for a $200,000 signing bonus. He played for the DSL Rangers of the Rookie-level Dominican Summer League in 2015 and 2016, hitting .233/.366/.273 with 13 runs batted in (RBI) in 2015 and .293/.402/.367 with 31 RBI in 2016. He split the 2017 season between the AZL Rangers of the Rookie-level Arizona League, the Spokane Indians of the Low–A Northwest League, and the Frisco RoughRiders of the Double–A Texas League, hitting a combined .233/.370/.301 with one home run and 21 RBI. He played for the Tiburones de La Guaira of the Venezuelan Winter League in the 2017 offseason.

Hernández split the 2018 season between Frisco and the Hickory Crawdads of the Single–A South Atlantic League, hitting a combined .261/.374/.325 with two home runs and 41 RBI. He split the 2019 season between Frisco and the Down East Wood Ducks of the High–A Carolina League, hitting a combined .289/.413/.330 with 50 RBI. Hernández played for the Auckland Tuatara of the Australian Baseball League following the 2019 season, hitting .229 with nine RBI over 27 games. Hernández spent time at the Rangers' alternate training site in 2020, as a result the cancelation of the minor league season because of the COVID-19 pandemic. Hernández opened the 2021 season with the Round Rock Express of the Triple-A West, hitting .250/.424/.323 with one home run, 13 RBI, and 21 stolen bases. On August 5, Texas selected his contract and promoted him to the active roster to make his major league debut. He recorded his first career hit on August 6, a single off Chris Bassitt. Over 43 games for Texas in 2021, he hit .217/.315/.252 with six RBI and 11 stolen bases.

=== Arizona Diamondbacks ===
On April 7, 2022, Hernández was traded to the Arizona Diamondbacks in exchange for Jeferson Espinal. He spent most of the season on optional assignment with the Triple–A Reno Aces. In 12 games for Arizona, Hernández went 2–for–24 (.083) with 2 walks.

=== Los Angeles Dodgers ===
On November 3, 2022, Hernández was claimed off waivers by the Oakland Athletics. On December 13, Hernández was designated for assignment by Oakland.

On December 15, 2022, Hernández was traded to the Los Angeles Dodgers in exchange for cash considerations. Hernández was optioned to the Triple-A Oklahoma City Dodgers to begin the 2023 season. He appeared in 14 games in the major leagues for Los Angeles, with three hits in 22 at-bats. On September 1, 2023, he was outrighted to the minors and removed from the 40-man roster. In 93 games for Oklahoma City, he hit .252/.395/.342 with four home runs, 34 RBI, and 17 stolen bases. Hernández elected free agency following the season on November 6.

=== Milwaukee Brewers ===
On November 16, 2023, Hernández signed a minor league contract with the Milwaukee Brewers. In 81 games for the Triple–A Nashville Sounds, he batted .241/.333/.309 with two home runs, 32 RBI, and 13 stolen bases. Hernández was released by the Brewers organization on July 30, 2024.

=== Long Island Ducks ===
On August 13, 2024, Hernández signed with the Long Island Ducks of the Atlantic League of Professional Baseball. In 31 games, he hit .325/.431/.392 with no home runs, 14 RBI, and 20 stolen bases. He became a free agent following the season.

=== New York Mets ===
On December 10, 2024, Hernández signed with the Pericos de Puebla of the Mexican League. However, on December 22, Hernández signed a minor league contract with the New York Mets. In 2025, he made 114 appearances split between the Double–A Binghamton Rumble Ponies and Triple–A Syracuse Mets, batting a cumulative .303/.380/.372 with one home run, 38 RBI, and 10 assists.

Hernández made 74 appearances for Syracuse in 2026, slashing .305/.394/.385 with two home runs, 29 RBI, and 11 stolen bases. He was released by the Mets organization on July 22, 2026.

=== Sultanes de Monterrey ===
On August 4, 2026, Hernández signed with the Sultanes de Monterrey of the Mexican League.

== International career ==
Hernández played for Venezuela in the 2011 Little League World Series. Hernández played for Venezuela in the 2021 Olympic Qualifying Tournament.

== See also ==
- List of Major League Baseball players from Venezuela
