= 2022 Los Angeles Dodgers season =

2022 Los Angeles Dodgers
- National League West champions
- League: National League
- Division: West
- Ballpark: Dodger Stadium
- City: Los Angeles, California
- Record: 111–51 (.685)
- Divisional place: 1st
- Owners: Guggenheim Baseball Management
- President: Stan Kasten
- President of baseball operations: Andrew Friedman
- General managers: Brandon Gomes
- Managers: Dave Roberts
- Television: Spectrum SportsNet LA (Joe Davis, Tim Neverett or Daron Sutton, Orel Hershiser, Nomar Garciaparra, Eric Karros, Jessica Mendoza or Dontrelle Willis, and Kirsten Watson or David Vassegh) (Spanish audio feed) (Jaime Jarrín, Pepe Yñiguez, Fernando Valenzuela)
- Radio: KLAC-AM; Los Angeles Dodgers Radio Network (Charley Steiner, Tim Neverett, Rick Monday, José Mota); KTNQ (Jaime Jarrín, Pepe Yñiguez, Fernando Valenzuela, José Mota)

The 2022 Los Angeles Dodgers season was the 133rd season for the Los Angeles Dodgers franchise in Major League Baseball, their 65th season in Los Angeles, California, and their 60th season playing their home games at Dodger Stadium. The Dodgers hosted the 2022 Major League Baseball All-Star Game on July 19, 2022. This was the last season for Hall of Fame Spanish-language play-by-play announcer Jaime Jarrín, who had been calling games for the team since 1959.

On December 2, 2021, Commissioner of Baseball Rob Manfred announced a lockout of players, following expiration of the collective bargaining agreement (CBA) between the league and the Major League Baseball Players Association (MLBPA). On March 10, 2022, MLB and the MLBPA agreed to a new collective bargaining agreement, thus ending the lockout. Opening Day was rescheduled for April 7. Although MLB previously announced that several series would be cancelled due to the lockout, the agreement provided for a full 162-game season, with originally canceled games made up throughout the season via doubleheaders, loss of off-days and extending the season by three days.

On August 2, Vin Scully, a Hall of Fame broadcaster for the team from 1950 to 2016, died at the age of 94.

Bolstered by the signing of Freddie Freeman, the Dodgers became the first team to clinch a playoff spot on September 12, the 10th straight year they had made the postseason. The following day, they also clinched their 20th National League West title, and their ninth in the last 10 seasons. On September 28, they broke the franchise record for total regular season wins by clocking their 107th victory of the year, surpassing the previous franchise high of 106 wins. The team also clinched the top seed in MLB for the first time since the 2017 squad. The Dodgers' 111 wins overall were the most by a team since the 116-win Seattle Mariners in 2001. Despite the record, they were upset by the 89-win and division rival San Diego Padres in the National League Division Series, losing in four games, which meant that the Dodgers did not make it to the World Series despite 100 wins for the third time in four seasons. Their 111 regular season wins is the most for any team to fail to win a postseason series in the divisional era.

== Offseason ==
=== Broadcasting team ===
On September 28, 2021, the Dodgers Spanish language broadcaster since 1959, Jaime Jarrín, announced he would retire after the 2022 season. The Dodgers announced on March 14 several new additions to the broadcast team on SportsNet LA. Former Dodger Eric Karros, Dontrelle Willis, José Mota and Jessica Mendoza would be calling select road and home games as well as participating in the studio show. Another former Dodger Adrián González was hired as an analyst exclusively for the studio team.

=== Front office ===
On January 18, 2022, the Dodgers promoted Brandon Gomes to become the team's General Manager, the first time the Dodgers had someone in that position since Farhan Zaidi departed after the 2018 season.

=== Roster departures ===
On November 3, one day after the conclusion of the 2021 World Series, several Dodgers players became free agents: pitchers Danny Duffy, Cole Hamels, Kenley Jansen, Clayton Kershaw, Corey Knebel, Jimmy Nelson and Max Scherzer, first baseman Albert Pujols, shortstop Corey Seager, outfielder Steven Souza Jr. and infielder/outfielder Chris Taylor. On November 5, they outrighted pitchers Scott Alexander and Jimmie Sherfy and infielder Andy Burns, removing them from the 40-man roster. On November 6, they declined the 2022 option on relief pitcher Joe Kelly, making him a free agent. Outfielders Billy McKinney and Zach Reks were designated for assignment on November 19. On November 30, pitcher Andrew Vasquez was non-tendered and became a free agent. Infielder Sheldon Neuse was designated for assignment on December 1, and removed from the 40-man roster. On March 18, outfielder Luke Raley was traded to the Tampa Bay Rays in exchange for minor league pitcher Tanner Dodson. First baseman Matt Beaty was designated for assignment on March 23.

=== Roster additions ===
On November 10, the Dodgers signed pitcher Andrew Heaney to a one-year, $8.5 million, contract. On November 19, the Dodgers added five minor leaguers to the 40-man roster: Pitcher Michael Grove, infielders Jacob Amaya, Eddys Leonard, and Jorbit Vivas and outfielder James Outman. On November 30, the Dodgers signed relief pitcher Daniel Hudson to a one-year contract. On December 1, the Dodgers re-signed Chris Taylor to a four-year contract plus a team option for a fifth year. On March 13, 2022, the Dodgers re-signed Clayton Kershaw on a one-year, $17 million, contract. Pitcher Jimmy Nelson re-signed with the Dodgers for one-year, with a club option, on March 17. Pitcher Danny Duffy re-signed with the Dodgers for a similar one-year with club option deal the following day.

On March 18, as spring training was beginning, the Dodgers signed All-Star first baseman Freddie Freeman to a six-year, $162 million, contract. The same day, they signed pitcher Tyler Anderson to an $8 million one-year contract. On March 23, they signed infielder Hanser Alberto to a one-year, $1.6 million, contract that included a 2023 option.

Off-season 40-man roster moves

Departing Player	Date	Transaction	New Team	Arriving player	Old team	Date	Transaction
Danny Duffy	November 3	Free agent	Los Angeles Dodgers	Andrew Heaney	New York Yankees	November 10	Free agent signing
Cole Hamels	November 3	Free agent	N/A	Jacob Amaya	Tulsa Drillers	November 19	Added to 40-man roster
Kenley Jansen	November 3	Free agent	Atlanta Braves	Michael Grove	Tulsa Drillers	November 19	Added to 40-man roster
Clayton Kershaw	November 3	Free agent	Los Angeles Dodgers	Eddys Leonard	Great Lakes Loons	November 19	Added to 40-man roster
Corey Knebel	November 3	Free agent	Philadelphia Phillies	James Outman	Tulsa Drillers	November 19	Added to 40-man roster
Jimmy Nelson	November 3	Free agent	Los Angeles Dodgers	Jorbit Vivas	Great Lakes Loons	November 19	Added to 40-man roster
Albert Pujols	November 3	Free agent	St. Louis Cardinals	Daniel Hudson	San Diego Padres	November 30	Free agent signing
Max Scherzer	November 3	Free agent	New York Mets	Chris Taylor	Los Angeles Dodgers	December 1	Free agent signing
Corey Seager	November 3	Free agent	Texas Rangers	Clayton Kershaw	Los Angeles Dodgers	March 13	Free agent signing
Steven Souza Jr.	November 3	Free agent	Seattle Mariners	Jimmy Nelson	Los Angeles Dodgers	March 17	Free agent signing
Chris Taylor	November 3	Free agent	Los Angeles Dodgers	Danny Duffy	Los Angeles Dodgers	March 18	Free agent signing
Scott Alexander	November 5	Outrighted	San Francisco Giants	Freddie Freeman	Atlanta Braves	March 18	Free agent signing
Andy Burns	November 5	Outrighted	Oklahoma City Dodgers	Tyler Anderson	Seattle Mariners	March 18	Free agent signing
Jimmie Sherfy	November 5	Outrighted	Gastonia Honey Hunters	Hanser Alberto	Kansas City Royals	March 23	Free agent signing
Joe Kelly	November 6	Option declined	Chicago White Sox				
Billy McKinney	November 19	Designed for assignment	Texas Rangers				
Zach Reks	November 19	Designed for assignment	Texas Rangers				
Andrew Vasquez	November 30	Non-Tendered	Toronto Blue Jays				
Sheldon Neuse	December 1	Designated for assignment	Oakland Athletics				
Luke Raley	March 18	Trade	Tampa Bay Rays				
Matt Beaty	March 23	Designated for assignment	San Diego Padres				

=== Lockout ===
The expiration of the league's collective bargaining agreement (CBA) with the Major League Baseball Players Association occurred on December 1, 2021, with no new agreement in place. As a result, the team owners voted unanimously to lockout the players stopping all free agency and trades.

The parties came to an agreement on a new CBA on March 10, 2022.

=== Rule changes ===
Pursuant to the new CBA, several new rules were instituted for the 2022 season. The National League adopted the designated hitter full-time, a draft lottery was implemented, the postseason expanded from ten teams to twelve, and advertising patches appeared on player uniforms and helmets for the first time.

== Spring training ==
Spring Training non-roster invitees

Player	Position	2021 team(s)
Yency Almonte	Pitcher	Colorado Rockies
Beau Burrows	Pitcher	Detroit Tigers / Minnesota Twins
Jon Duplantier	Pitcher	Arizona Diamondbacks
Robbie Erlin	Pitcher	Hokkaido Nippon-Ham Fighters
Carson Fulmer	Pitcher	Cincinnati Reds
Sam Gaviglio	Pitcher	SSG Landers
Reyes Moronta	Pitcher	San Francisco Giants
Ryan Pepiot	Pitcher	Oklahoma City Dodgers / Tulsa Drillers
Yefry Ramírez	Pitcher	Los Angeles Dodgers
Bobby Wahl	Pitcher	Nashville Sounds / Oklahoma City Dodgers
Mike Wright	Pitcher	Chicago White Sox
Hunter Feduccia	Catcher	Tulsa Drillers
Carson Taylor	Catcher	Great Lakes Loons
Tomás Telis	Catcher	St. Paul Saints
Eddy Alvarez	Infielder	Miami Marlins
Andy Burns	Infielder	Los Angeles Dodgers
Michael Busch	Infielder	Tulsa Drillers
Kody Hoese	Infielder	Tulsa Drillers
Jake Lamb	Infielder	Chicago White Sox / Toronto Blue Jays
Miguel Vargas	Infielder	Great Lakes Loons / Tulsa Drillers
Ryan Noda	Outfielder	Tulsa Drillers
Jason Martin	Outfielder	Texas Rangers
Andy Pages	Outfielder	Great Lakes Loons
Stefen Romero	Outfielder	Orix Buffaloes

After the conclusion of the lockout, spring training was scheduled to begin on March 14 at Camelback Ranch in Glendale, Arizona. The Dodgers played a total of 18 games, 15 in the Arizona Cactus League and three Freeway Series games against the Los Angeles Angels.

During spring training, the Dodgers announced a three-year contract extension with Manager Dave Roberts, carrying him through the 2025 season. On April 1, they made a trade with the Chicago White Sox, acquiring reliever Craig Kimbrel in exchange for outfielder A. J. Pollock.

== Regular season ==
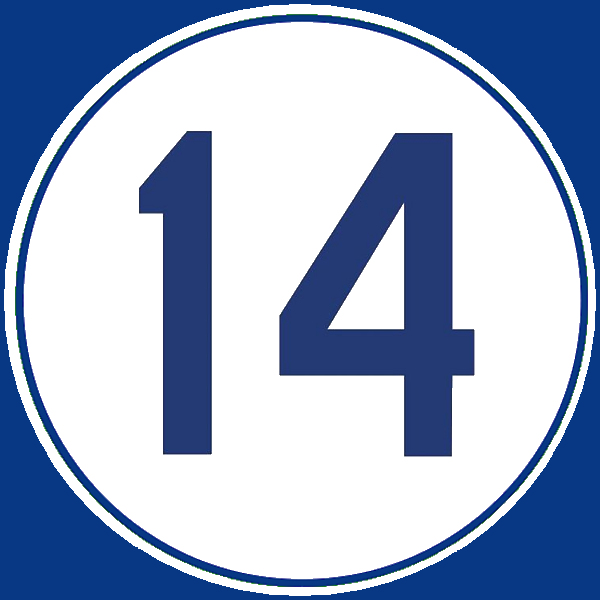
Gil Hodges's number 14 was retired by the Los Angeles Dodgers in 2022.

=== National League West ===
NL West
Team	W	L	Pct.	GB	Home	Road
Los Angeles Dodgers	111	51	.685	—	57‍–‍24	54‍–‍27
San Diego Padres	89	73	.549	22	44‍–‍37	45‍–‍36
San Francisco Giants	81	81	.500	30	44‍–‍37	37‍–‍44
Arizona Diamondbacks	74	88	.457	37	40‍–‍41	34‍–‍47
Colorado Rockies	68	94	.420	43	41‍–‍40	27‍–‍54

=== National League Wild Card ===
Wild Card standings

Division leaders
Team	W	L	Pct.
Los Angeles Dodgers	111	51	.685
Atlanta Braves	101	61	.623
St. Louis Cardinals	93	69	.574

Wild Card teams (Top 3 teams qualify for postseason)
Team	W	L	Pct.	GB
New York Mets	101	61	.623	+14
San Diego Padres	89	73	.549	+2
Philadelphia Phillies	87	75	.537	—
Milwaukee Brewers	86	76	.531	1
San Francisco Giants	81	81	.500	6
Arizona Diamondbacks	74	88	.457	13
Chicago Cubs	74	88	.457	13
Miami Marlins	69	93	.426	18
Colorado Rockies	68	94	.420	19
Pittsburgh Pirates	62	100	.383	25
Cincinnati Reds	62	100	.383	25
Washington Nationals	55	107	.340	32

=== Record vs. opponents ===
NL Records

2022 National League record Source: MLB Standings Grid – 2022
Team	AZ	ATL	CHC	CIN	COL	LAD	MIA	MIL	NYM	PHI	PIT	SD	SF	STL	WSH	AL
Arizona	—	2–4	4–3	3–4	9–10	5–14	5–1	4–3	2–4	3–3	4–3	5–14	10–9	2–5	4–3	12–8
Atlanta	4–2	—	3–3	4–3	6–1	2–4	13–6	3–3	10–9	11–8	7–0	3–4	4–3	4–3	14–5	13–7
Chicago	3–4	3–3	—	11–8	3–4	0–7	4–2	10–9	4–3	6–0	10–9	2–5	2–5	6–13	4–2	6–14
Cincinnati	4–3	3–4	8–11	—	2–4	0–7	4–3	6–13	1–5	1–6	7–12	0–6	4–2	7–12	3–4	12–8
Colorado	10–9	1–6	4–3	4–2	—	8–11	2–4	3–4	2–5	2–5	3–3	10–9	5–14	2–4	3–4	9–11
Los Angeles	14–5	4–2	7–0	7–0	11–8	—	6–1	4–3	3–4	3–4	1–5	14–5	15–4	4–2	3–3	15–5
Miami	1–5	6–13	2–4	3–4	4–2	1–6	—	4–3	6–13	7–12	4–3	3–4	3–4	2–4	15–4	8–12
Milwaukee	3–4	3–3	9–10	13–6	4–3	3–4	3–4	—	2–4	2–4	11–8	3–4	3–4	9–10	3–3	15–5
New York	4–2	9–10	3–4	5–1	5–2	4–3	13–6	4–2	—	14–5	6–1	2–4	4–3	5–2	14–5	9–11
Philadelphia	3–3	8–11	0–6	6–1	5–2	4–3	12–7	4–2	5–14	—	6–1	4–3	1–5	4–3	16–3	9–11
Pittsburgh	3–4	0–7	9–10	12–7	3–3	5–1	3–4	8–11	1–6	1–6	—	2–4	1–5	6–13	4–3	4–16
San Diego	14–5	4–3	5–2	6–0	9–10	5–14	4–3	4–3	4–2	3–4	4–2	—	13–6	2–4	4–3	8–12
San Francisco	9–10	3–4	5–2	2–4	14–5	4–15	4–3	4–3	3–4	5–1	5–1	6–13	—	3–4	4–2	10–10
St. Louis	5–2	3–4	13–6	12–7	4–2	2–4	4–2	10–9	2–5	3–4	13–6	4–2	4–3	—	4–3	10–10
Washington	3–4	5–14	2–4	4–3	4–3	3–3	4–15	3–3	5–14	3–16	3–4	3–4	2–4	3–4	—	8–12

Updated with the results of all games through October 5, 2022.

=== Game log ===
2022 Game Log: 111–51 (Home: 57–24; Away: 54–27)
April: 13–7 (Home: 7–2; Away: 6–5)

#	Date	Opponent	Score	Win	Loss	Save	Attendance	Record
1	April 8	@ Rockies	**W** 5–3	**Buehler** (1–0)	Freeland (0–1)	**Kimbrel** (1)	48,627	1–0
2	April 9	@ Rockies	L 2–3	Estévez (1–0)	**Treinen** (0–1)	Bard (1)	48,087	1–1
3	April 10	@ Rockies	L 4–9	Chacín (1–0)	**Urías** (0–1)	Blach (1)	40,825	1–2
4	April 12	@ Twins	**W** 7–2	**Hudson** (1–0)	Pagán (0–1)	—	16,732	2–2
5	April 13	@ Twins	**W** 7–0	**Kershaw** (1–0)	Paddack (0–1)	—	17,101	3–2
6	April 14	Reds	**W** 9–3	**Treinen** (1–1)	Wilson (0–1)	—	52,955	4–2
7	April 15	Reds	**W** 3–1	**Anderson** (1–0)	Gutiérrez (0–2)	**Kimbrel** (2)	51,891	5–2
8	April 16	Reds	**W** 5–2	**Phillips** (1–0)	Greene (1–1)	**Hudson** (1)	51,059	6–2
9	April 17	Reds	**W** 9–1	**Heaney** (1–0)	Mahle (1–1)	—	41,167	7–2
10	April 18	Braves	**W** 7–4	**Kershaw** (2–0)	Ynoa (0–2)	**Kimbrel** (3)	52,052	8–2
11	April 19	Braves	L 1–3	Fried (1–2)	**Buehler** (1–1)	Jansen (3)	51,889	8–3
12	April 20	Braves	**W** 5–1	**Gonsolin** (1–0)	Morton (1–2)	—	38,888	9–3
13	April 22	@ Padres	**W** 6–1	**Urías** (1–1)	Martinez (0–2)	—	44,482	10–3
14	April 23	@ Padres	L 2–3 (10)	Suárez (1–1)	**Bruihl** (0–1)	—	44,444	10–4
15	April 24	@ Padres	**W** 10–2	**Kershaw** (3–0)	Manaea (2–2)	—	44,930	11–4
16	April 25	@ Diamondbacks	**W** 4–0	**Buehler** (2–1)	Kelly (1–1)	—	17,750	12–4
17	April 26	@ Diamondbacks	L 3–5	Kennedy (1–1)	**Graterol** (0–1)	Melancon (3)	18,063	12–5
18	April 27	@ Diamondbacks	L 1–3	Kennedy (2–1)	**Hudson** (1–1)	Melancon (4)	15,138	12–6
19	April 29	Tigers	**W** 5–1	**Anderson** (2–0)	Alexander (0–3)	—	49,394	13–6
20	April 30	Tigers	L 1–5	Barnes (2–0)	**Phillips** (1–1)	—	52,613	13–7

May: 20–9 (Home: 8–5; Away: 12–4)

#	Date	Opponent	Score	Win	Loss	Save	Attendance	Record
21	May 1	Tigers	**W** 6–3	**Buehler** (3–1)	Rodríguez (0–2)	**Kimbrel** (4)	51,172	14–7
22	May 3	Giants	**W** 3–1	**Urías** (2–1)	Rodón (3–1)	**Kimbrel** (5)	43,370	15–7
23	May 4	Giants	**W** 9–1	**Gonsolin** (2–0)	Wood (2–2)	—	52,203	16–7
—	May 6	@ Cubs	Postponed (Rain; Makeup: May 7)					
24	May 7 (1)	@ Cubs	**W** 7–0	**Kershaw** (4–0)	Smyly (1–3)	—	37,594	17–7
25	May 7 (2)	@ Cubs	**W** 6–2	**Anderson** (3–0)	Norris (0–2)	—	31,520	18–7
26	May 8	@ Cubs	**W** 7–1	**Buehler** (4–1)	Steele (1–4)	—	31,424	19–7
27	May 9	@ Pirates	L 1–5	Quintana (1–1)	**Urías** (2–2)	—	8,527	19–8
28	May 10	@ Pirates	**W** 11–1	**Gonsolin** (3–0)	Wilson (0–2)	—	11,583	20–8
29	May 11	@ Pirates	L 3–5	Crowe (2–2)	**Hudson** (1–2)	Bednar (5)	11,105	20–9
30	May 12	Phillies	L 7–9	Bellatti (1–0)	**Hudson** (1–3)	Knebel (7)	46,539	20–10
31	May 13	Phillies	L 10–12 (10)	Familia (1–0)	**Graterol** (0–2)	Morales (1)	50,712	20–11
32	May 14	Phillies	L 3–8	Suárez (4–1)	**Urías** (2–3)	—	50,279	20–12
33	May 15	Phillies	**W** 5–4	**Greene** (1–0)	Knebel (0–3)	—	51,869	21–12
34	May 16	Diamondbacks	**W** 5–4	**Gonsolin** (4–0)	Bumgarner (2–2)	**Kimbrel** (6)	42,650	22–12
35	May 17 (1)	Diamondbacks	**W** 7–6	**White** (1–0)	Gilbert (0–2)	**Kimbrel** (7)	42,089	23–12
36	May 17 (2)	Diamondbacks	**W** 12–3	**Anderson** (4–0)	Kelly (3–2)	—	46,850	24–12
37	May 18	Diamondbacks	**W** 5–3	**Buehler** (5–1)	Davies (2–2)	**Hudson** (2)	35,643	25–12
38	May 20	@ Phillies	**W** 4–1	**Urías** (3–3)	Suárez (4–2)	**Kimbrel** (8)	30,025	26–12
39	May 21	@ Phillies	**W** 7–4	**Hudson** (2–3)	Alvarado (0–1)	**Kimbrel** (9)	32,068	27–12
40	May 22	@ Phillies	L 3–4 (10)	Knebel (1–3)	**Phillips** (1–2)	—	34,021	27–13
41	May 23	@ Nationals	**W** 10–1	**Anderson** (5–0)	Adon (1–8)	—	22,423	28–13
42	May 24	@ Nationals	**W** 9–4	**Buehler** (6–1)	Gray (4–4)	—	22,418	29–13
43	May 25	@ Nationals	L 0–1	Fedde (3–3)	**Urías** (3–4)	Rainey (4)	23,341	29–14
44	May 26	@ Diamondbacks	**W** 14–1	**Bruihl** (1–1)	Castellanos (3–2)	—	17,057	30–14
45	May 27	@ Diamondbacks	**W** 6–4	**Graterol** (1–2)	Bumgarner (2–3)	—	24,865	31–14
46	May 28	@ Diamondbacks	**W** 3–2	**Gonsolin** (5–0)	Kelly (3–3)	**Hudson** (3)	30,819	32–14
47	May 29	@ Diamondbacks	**W** 3–1	**Anderson** (6–0)	Davies (2–3)	**Kimbrel** (10)	30,482	33–14
48	May 30	Pirates	L 5–6	Bednar (2–1)	**Kimbrel** (0–1)	—	46,724	33–15
49	May 31	Pirates	L 3–5	Keller (2–5)	**Urías** (3–5)	Crowe (2)	52,686	33–16

June: 14–12 (Home: 6–5; Away: 8–7)

#	Date	Opponent	Score	Win	Loss	Save	Attendance	Record
50	June 1	Pirates	L 4–8	De Jong (2–0)	**White** (1–1)	—	39,324	33–17
51	June 2	Mets	**W** 2–0	**Gonsolin** (6–0)	Walker (3–1)	**Kimbrel** (11)	48,018	34–17
52	June 3	Mets	**W** 6–1	**Anderson** (7–0)	Bassitt (4–3)	**Hudson** (4)	52,505	35–17
53	June 4	Mets	L 4–9	Holderman (3–0)	**Buehler** (6–2)	—	50,165	35–18
54	June 5	Mets	L 4–5 (10)	Lugo (1–1)	**Kimbrel** (0–2)	Medina (1)	48,672	35–19
55	June 7	@ White Sox	L 0–4	Kopech (2–2)	**Bickford** (0–1)	—	25,625	35–20
56	June 8	@ White Sox	**W** 4–1	**Gonsolin** (7–0)	Cueto (0–3)	**Hudson** (5)	25,078	36–20
57	June 9	@ White Sox	**W** 11–9	**Graterol** (2–2)	Cease (4–3)	—	25,482	37–20
58	June 10	@ Giants	L 2–7	Junis (4–1)	**Buehler** (6–3)	—	39,701	37–21
59	June 11	@ Giants	L 2–3	Doval (2–2)	**Kershaw** (4–1)	Álvarez (1)	41,236	37–22
60	June 12	@ Giants	L 0–2	Rodón (5–4)	**Urías** (3–6)	McGee (3)	41,197	37–23
61	June 14	Angels	**W** 2–0	**Gonsolin** (8–0)	Syndergaard (4–5)	**Kimbrel** (12)	51,013	38–23
62	June 15	Angels	**W** 4–1	**Anderson** (8–0)	Detmers (2–3)	—	50,812	39–23
63	June 17	Guardians	L 1–2 (10)	Gose (3–0)	**Phillips** (1–3)	De Los Santos (1)	48,361	39–24
64	June 18	Guardians	**W** 7–1	**Urías** (4–6)	Quantrill (4–4)	—	50,078	40–24
65	June 19	Guardians	L 3–5	Morgan (3–2)	**Kimbrel** (0–3)	Clase (15)	53,033	40–25
66	June 21	@ Reds	**W** 8–2	**Gonsolin** (9–0)	Mahle (2–6)	—	18,476	41–25
67	June 22	@ Reds	**W** 8–4	**Vesia** (1–0)	Detwiler (0–2)	—	17,344	42–25
68	June 23	@ Reds	**W** 10–5	**Kershaw** (5–1)	Greene (3–8)	—	21,989	43–25
69	June 24	@ Braves	**W** 4–1	**Urías** (5–6)	Anderson (6–4)	**Kimbrel** (13)	42,105	44–25
70	June 25	@ Braves	L 3–5	Minter (4–1)	**Graterol** (2–3)	Jansen (20)	42,161	44–26
71	June 26	@ Braves	**W** 5–3 (11)	**Kimbrel** (1–3)	O'Day (1–2)	**Graterol** (1)	42,217	45–26
72	June 27	@ Rockies	L 0–4	Kuhl (5–5)	**Anderson** (8–1)	—	38,706	45–27
73	June 28	@ Rockies	L 4–7	Freeland (4–5)	**Kershaw** (5–2)	—	36,097	45–28
74	June 29	@ Rockies	**W** 8–4	**Urías** (6–6)	Márquez (4–6)	—	37,092	46–28
75	June 30	Padres	**W** 3–1	**Phillips** (2–3)	Musgrove (8–2)	**Kimbrel** (14)	53,094	47–28

July: 21–5 (Home: 14–3; Away: 7–2)

#	Date	Opponent	Score	Win	Loss	Save	Attendance	Record
76	July 1	Padres	**W** 5–1	**Gonsolin** (10–0)	Stammen (1–1)	—	48,076	48–28
77	July 2	Padres	**W** 7–2	**Anderson** (9–1)	Darvish (7–4)	—	47,061	49–28
78	July 3	Padres	L 2–4	Martinez (3–3)	**Kimbrel** (1–4)	Rogers (23)	42,633	49–29
79	July 4	Rockies	**W** 5–3	**Urías** (7–6)	Freeland (4–6)	**Almonte** (1)	47,163	50–29
80	July 5	Rockies	**W** 5–2	**Pepiot** (1–0)	Márquez (4–7)	**Graterol** (2)	45,885	51–29
81	July 6	Rockies	**W** 2–1	**Kimbrel** (2–4)	Bard (3–3)	—	45,098	52–29
82	July 7	Cubs	**W** 5–3	**Gonsolin** (11–0)	Leiter Jr. (2–3)	**Vesia** (1)	52,072	53–29
83	July 8	Cubs	**W** 4–3 (10)	**Phillips** (3–3)	Wick (1–4)	—	44,158	54–29
84	July 9	Cubs	**W** 4–2	**Kershaw** (6–2)	Wick (1–5)	**Kimbrel** (15)	45,198	55–29
85	July 10	Cubs	**W** 11–9	**Bickford** (1–1)	Leiter Jr (2–4)	**Graterol** (3)	41,824	56–29
86	July 12	@ Cardinals	L 6–7	Oviedo (2–1)	**White** (1–2)	Gallegos (10)	37,150	56–30
87	July 13	@ Cardinals	**W** 7–6	**Kimbrel** (3–4)	Gallegos (2–4)	**Phillips** (1)	39,292	57–30
88	July 14	@ Cardinals	**W** 4–0	**Anderson** (10–1)	Hudson (6–6)	—	40,062	58–30
89	July 15	@ Angels	**W** 9–1	**Kershaw** (7–2)	Sandoval (3–5)	—	44,648	59–30
90	July 16	@ Angels	**W** 7–1	**Urías** (8–6)	Suárez (1–4)	—	44,728	60–30
–	July 19	92nd All-Star Game	American League vs. National League (Dodger Stadium, Los Angeles, California)					
91	July 21	Giants	**W** 9–6	**Phillips** (4–3)	Leone (3–2)	**Kimbrel** (16)	53,165	61–30
92	July 22	Giants	**W** 5–1	**Vesia** (2–0)	Long (1–3)	—	51,316	62–30
93	July 23	Giants	**W** 4–2	**Urías** (9–6)	Wood (6–8)	**Price** (1)	47,749	63–30
94	July 24	Giants	**W** 7–4	**Phillips** (5–3)	Leone (3–3)	**Kimbrel** (17)	47,505	64–30
95	July 25	Nationals	L 1–4	Machado (1–0)	**Gonsolin** (11–1)	Finnegan (3)	48,647	64–31
96	July 26	Nationals	L 3–8	Ramírez (2–1)	**Cleavinger** (0–1)	—	53,302	64–32
97	July 27	Nationals	**W** 7–1	**Vesia** (3–0)	Corbin (4–14)	—	44,229	65–32
98	July 28	@ Rockies	**W** 13–0	**Anderson** (11–1)	Ureña (1–3)	—	32,182	66–32
99	July 29	@ Rockies	**W** 5–4	**Urías** (10–6)	Kuhl (6–6)	**Kimbrel** (18)	41,656	67–32
100	July 30	@ Rockies	L 3–5	Freeland (6–7)	**Kershaw** (7–3)	Bard (22)	47,415	67–33
101	July 31	@ Rockies	**W** 7–3	**Gonsolin** (12–1)	Márquez (6–9)	—	36,212	68–33

August: 22–6 (Home: 10–1; Away: 12–5)

#	Date	Opponent	Score	Win	Loss	Save	Attendance	Record
102	August 1	@ Giants	**W** 8–2	**Ferguson** (1–0)	Webb (9–5)	—	34,865	69–33
103	August 2	@ Giants	**W** 9–5	**Anderson** (12–1)	Wood (7–9)	—	32,798	70–33
104	August 3	@ Giants	**W** 3–0	**Urías** (11–6)	Cobb (3–6)	**Kimbrel** (19)	35,400	71–33
105	August 4	@ Giants	**W** 5–3	**Martin** (2–0)	Junis (4–3)	**Kimbrel** (20)	34,640	72–33
106	August 5	Padres	**W** 8–1	**Gonsolin** (13–1)	Manaea (6–6)	—	52,714	73–33
107	August 6	Padres	**W** 8–3	**Martin** (3–0)	Clevinger (3–4)	—	52,124	74–33
108	August 7	Padres	**W** 4–0	**Anderson** (13–1)	Darvish (10–5)	—	48,093	75–33
109	August 9	Twins	**W** 10–3	**Urías** (12–6)	Ryan (8–5)	—	47,874	76–33
110	August 10	Twins	**W** 8–5	**Price** (1–0)	Fulmer (4–5)	—	53,432	77–33
111	August 12	@ Royals	**W** 8–3	**Gonsolin** (14–1)	Staumont (3–2)	—	24,333	78–33
112	August 13	@ Royals	**W** 13–3	**Bickford** (2–1)	Keller (6–13)	—	29,689	79–33
113	August 14	@ Royals	L 0–4	Singer (6–4)	**Anderson** (13–2)	Barlow (19)	18,481	79–34
114	August 15	@ Brewers	**W** 4–0	**Urías** (13–6)	Peralta (4–3)	—	27,084	80–34
115	August 16	@ Brewers	L 4–5 (11)	Suter (4–3)	**Kimbrel** (3–5)	—	32,948	80–35
116	August 17	@ Brewers	**W** 2–1	**Gonsolin** (15–1)	Lauer (8–5)	**Kimbrel** (21)	30,259	81–35
117	August 18	@ Brewers	L 3–5	Burnes (9–5)	**Heaney** (1–1)	Williams (8)	27,403	81–36
118	August 19	Marlins	**W** 2–1	**Martin** (4–0)	Floro (0–2)	**Phillips** (2)	50,431	82–36
119	August 20	Marlins	**W** 7–0	**May** (1–0)	Hoeing (0–1)	—	51,813	83–36
120	August 21	Marlins	**W** 10–3	**Pepiot** (2–0)	Alcántara (11–6)	—	42,125	84–36
121	August 22	Brewers	L 0–4	Lauer (9–5)	**Urías** (13–7)	—	37,091	84–37
122	August 23	Brewers	**W** 10–1	**Gonsolin** (16–1)	Burnes (9–6)	—	53,222	85–37
123	August 24	Brewers	**W** 12–6	**Heaney** (2–1)	Houser (4–9)	—	47,216	86–37
124	August 26	@ Marlins	**W** 10–6 (10)	**Price** (2–0)	Nardi (0–1)	—	9,365	87–37
125	August 27	@ Marlins	L 1–2	Alcántara (12–6)	**May** (1–1)	—	23,543	87–38
126	August 28	@ Marlins	**W** 8–1	**Urías** (14–7)	Cabrera (4–2)	—	13,617	88–38
127	August 29	@ Marlins	**W** 3–2 (10)	**Kimbrel** (4–5)	Brazobán (0–1)	**Martin** (1)	10,288	89–38
128	August 30	@ Mets	**W** 4–3	**Hembree** (3–0)	Rodríguez (0–4)	**Reed** (1)	40,607	90–38
129	August 31	@ Mets	L 1–2	deGrom (4–1)	**Anderson** (13–3)	Díaz (29)	41,799	90–39

September: 19–9 (Home: 10–5; Away: 9–4)

#	Date	Opponent	Score	Win	Loss	Save	Attendance	Record
130	September 1	@ Mets	L 3–5	Bassitt (12–7)	**Martin** (4–1)	Ottavino (3)	36,908	90–40
131	September 2	Padres	L 1–7	Darvish (12–7)	**May** (1–2)	—	45,164	90–41
132	September 3	Padres	**W** 12–1	**Urías** (15–7)	Manaea (7–8)	—	46,144	91–41
133	September 4	Padres	**W** 9–4	**Vesia** (4–0)	Clevinger (5–6)	—	48,522	92–41
134	September 5	Giants	L 4–7	Webb (12–8)	**Heaney** (2–2)	Doval (20)	51,887	92–42
135	September 6	Giants	**W** 6–3	**Anderson** (14–3)	García (1–4)	**Kimbrel** (22)	39,752	93–42
136	September 7	Giants	**W** 7–3	**Phillips** (6–3)	Littell (2–3)	—	39,237	94–42
137	September 9	@ Padres	L 4–5 (10)	Morejón (4–0)	**Hembree** (3–1)	—	43.286	94–43
138	September 10	@ Padres	**W** 8–4	**Urías** (16–7)	Snell (6–9)	—	43,639	95–43
139	September 11	@ Padres	**W** 11–2	**Heaney** (3–2)	Musgrove (9–7)	—	41,652	96–43
140	September 12	@ Diamondbacks	**W** 6–0	**Anderson** (15–3)	Nelson (2–1)	—	19,393	97–43
141	September 13	@ Diamondbacks	**W** 4–0	**Kershaw** (8–3)	Kelly (12–6)	—	21,143	98–43
142	September 14	@ Diamondbacks	L 3–5 (10)	Moronta (1–0)	**Kimbrel** (4–6)	—	22,971	98–44
143	September 16	@ Giants	**W** 5–0	**May** (2–2)	Webb (13–9)	—	37,487	99–44
144	September 17	@ Giants	**W** 7–2	**Urías** (17–7)	Hjelle (0–2)	—	40,171	100–44
145	September 18	@ Giants	**W** 4–3 (10)	**Kimbrel** (5–6)	Brebbia (6–2)	**Bruihl** (1)	32,137	101–44
146	September 19	Diamondbacks	**W** 5–2	**Kershaw** (9–3)	Kelly (12–7)	—	44,854	102–44
147	September 20 (1)	Diamondbacks	**W** 6–5	**Pepiot** (3–0)	Ginkel (1–1)	**Martin** (2)	38,902	103–44
148	September 20 (2)	Diamondbacks	L 2–5	Jameson (2–0)	**Anderson** (15–4)	Moronta (1)	43,097	103–45
149	September 21	Diamondbacks	L 1–6	Bumgarner (7–15)	**May** (2–3)	—	38,845	103–46
150	September 22	Diamondbacks	**W** 3–2	**Kimbrel** (6–6)	Moronta (1–1)	—	47,907	104–46
151	September 23	Cardinals	L 0–11	Quintana (6–6)	**Heaney** (3–3)	—	50,041	104–47
152	September 24	Cardinals	**W** 6–2	**Kershaw** (10–3)	Montgomery (8–6)	—	52,527	105–47
153	September 25	Cardinals	**W** 4–1	**Grove** (1–0)	Wainwright (11–11)	**Jackson** (1)	48,695	106–47
154	September 27	@ Padres	L 3–4 (10)	Johnson (1–1)	**Kimbrel** (6–7)	—	32,127	106–48
155	September 28	@ Padres	**W** 1–0 (10)	**Vesia** (5–0)	Wilson (4–2)	**Kahnle** (1)	32,523	107–48
156	September 29	@ Padres	**W** 5–2	**Heaney** (4–3)	Johnson (1–2)	**Price** (2)	35,636	108–48
157	September 30	Rockies	**W** 10–1	**Kershaw** (11–3)	Kuhl (6–11)	—	52,025	109–48

October: 2–3 (Home: 2–3; Away: 0–0)

#	Date	Opponent	Score	Win	Loss	Save	Attendance	Record
158	October 1	Rockies	**W** 6–4	**Phillips** (7–3)	Hollowell (0–2)	**Graterol** (4)	47,334	110–48
159	October 2	Rockies	L 1–4	Márquez (9–13)	**Anderson** (15–5)	Bard (33)	44,091	110–49
160	October 3	Rockies	L 1–2	Bird (2–4)	**Graterol** (2–4)	Lawrence (1)	52,012	110–50
161	October 4	Rockies	L 2–5	Feltner (4–9)	**Heaney** (4–4)	Bard (34)	51,833	110–51
162	October 5	Rockies	**W** 6–1	**Kershaw** (12–3)	Smith (0–1)	—	37,514	111–51

Legend: = Win = Loss = Postponement
Bold = Dodgers team member

=== Season summary ===
Opening Day starters
Name	Position
Mookie Betts	Right fielder
Freddie Freeman	First baseman
Trea Turner	Shortstop
Justin Turner	Designated Hitter
Max Muncy	Third baseman
Will Smith	Catcher
Chris Taylor	Left fielder
Cody Bellinger	Center fielder
Gavin Lux	Second baseman
Walker Buehler	Starting pitcher

==== April ====
The Dodgers began the season with a three-game road series against the Colorado Rockies at Coors Field, the second consecutive season they began in Colorado. Walker Buehler in his first career Opening Day start, allowed two runs on four hits with five strikeouts as the Dodgers won 5–3. The Rockies evened the series the next day with a 3–2 win thanks to a go-ahead homer by Connor Joe in the eighth inning. The Rockies won the final game of the series, 9–4, the first series win over the Dodgers at Coors since the 2018 season. The Dodgers next had a two-game series against the Minnesota Twins at Target Field. Andrew Heaney made his first start as a Dodger and struck out five in 4 1/3 innings while the Dodgers offense scored six runs in the eighth inning to win 7–2. In the following game, Clayton Kershaw struck out 13 batters in seven perfect innings before he was removed by Manager Dave Roberts. The Twins got only one hit in the game, on a single off reliever Alex Vesia in the eighth. The Dodgers won 7–0 thanks to four home runs, including three straight in the top of the eighth.

On April 14, the Dodgers played their home opener against the Cincinnati Reds at Dodger Stadium. Will Smith hit a three-run homer as part of a six run eighth inning that led to a 9–3 win. The Dodgers also won on Jackie Robinson Day, 3–1, as both Trea Turner and Gavin Lux tripled in the game. Julio Urías allowed only one hit while striking out five in five scoreless innings on April 16 while Trea Turner's two run homer put the Dodgers on top and led to a 5–2 win. The Dodgers finished off the sweep of the Reds with a 9–1 win. Heaney struck out 11 and only allowed one hit in six scoreless innings and the Dodgers scored seven runs in the fourth inning to blow the game open. Freddie Freeman homered in his first at-bat against his former team when the Atlanta Braves came to town for a three-game series and the Dodgers won 7–4. The Braves won the next game, 3–1, to snap the seven game winning streak. The Dodgers only got two hits off Max Fried in seven innings. The Dodgers took the final game of the series, 5–1. Tony Gonsolin allowed only one hit in six scoreless innings and Freeman and Edwin Ríos homered in the win.

The Dodgers began a three-game weekend series with the San Diego Padres at Petco Park on April 22. In the opener, Mookie Betts hit two home runs and Max Muncy hit one as they won 6–1. The Padres won the next day on a walk-off sacrifice fly by Austin Nola in the 10th inning. The Dodgers routed the Padres in the final game of the series, 10–2, as Cody Bellinger hit two home runs. The Dodgers headed to Chase Field for a three-game series against the Arizona Diamondbacks. Buehler pitched a complete game shutout, striking out 10 while allowing three hits and no walks. Will Smith homered in the game as the Dodgers won 4–0. The Diamondbacks won the next game, 5–3, thanks to a two-run homer by David Peralta in the eighth. Urías allowed only one run on one hit (a solo homer by Nick Ahmed) in six innings in the series finale, but the Dodgers lost 3–1 thanks to some sloppy defense in the eighth inning. This was the Dodgers first series loss to the Diamondbacks since the 2019 season.

The Dodgers returned home to play the Detroit Tigers at Dodger Stadium for the first time since 2014. In the first game, Justin Turner and Chris Taylor homered and the Dodgers won 5–1. On April 30, Kershaw struck out Spencer Torkelson to move past Don Sutton to become the Dodgers all-time franchise strikeout leader. However, the Dodgers lost the game 5–1 as the bullpen allowed four runs to score and the offense was silent.

==== May ====
Walker Buehler struck out five in five scoreless innings and the Dodgers won the final game against the Tigers, 6–3. On May 3, the Dodgers began a quick two-game series against the San Francisco Giants. Julio Urías pitched six shutout innings, Chris Taylor doubled in two runs, and the Dodgers won 3–1. They won again the next day, 9–1. Mookie Betts and Max Muncy each hit home runs, and Freddie Freeman added two runs off a triple.

The Dodgers went back on the road to play the Chicago Cubs at Wrigley Field, beginning with a doubleheader on May 7 as a result of poor weather the previous day. In the opener, Clayton Kershaw pitched seven shutout innings and the Dodgers won 7–0. In the second game, the Dodgers won 6–2 thanks to Betts, who drove in five of the runs on a double and a home run, two of the Dodgers three hits in the game. Buehler struck out six and only allowed one run as the Dodgers finished off the sweep of the Cubs with a 7–1 win on May 8. The Dodgers then traveled to PNC Park for a series with the Pittsburgh Pirates, losing the opener 5–1. The Dodgers got even the next day as Tony Gonsolin pitched five scoreless innings, Justin Turner doubled three times with four RBI. Edwin Ríos homered and they won 11–1. However, the Pirates won the series by taking the next game, 5–3. Ryan Pepiot made his MLB debut as the Dodgers starting pitcher, and was wild with five walks and a hit batter in three innings but did not allow a run. The Pirates hit three homeruns against the Dodgers bullpen, giving them their first series win against Los Angeles since the 2016 season.

On May 12, the Dodgers returned home to play the Philadelphia Phillies. They fell behind by six runs, rallied to tie the game in the bottom of the eighth only to lose when the Phillies added two more in the ninth, 9–7. The Phillies won again the next day, 12–10 in 10 innings. Urías had the worst start of his career on May 14, allowing career highs in runs (eight) and home runs (four) as the Phillies crushed the Dodgers 8–3, extending the losing streak to four. The Dodgers fell behind again the next game, but came back to win the game on a ninth inning triple by Cody Bellinger followed by a walk-off hit by Gavin Lux for a 5–4 win. Tony Gonsolin allowed two runs in six innings while striking out seven as the Dodgers won the opener of a series with the Arizona Diamondbacks, 5–4. The Dodgers and Diamondbacks played a doubleheader on May 17, the first scheduled one at Dodger Stadium since the 1987 season. The Dodgers won both games, hitting four home runs in a 7–6 win in the first game and taking the second game, 12–3, as Ríos hit a three-run homer. They managed to finish off a four-game sweep of the Diamondbacks with a 5–3 win on May 17, with a three-run homer by Justin Turner in the fourth inning the key moment.

The Dodgers went back on the road on May 20, playing the Phillies at Citizens Bank Park. Urías rebounded from his poor outing in his previous outing to pitch five shutout innings while the Dodgers took the opener, 4–1. Betts had three hits, including a homer and a double as the Dodgers won 7–4 the following day. In the last matchup of the series the next day, Gonsolin struck out seven in six innings and the Dodgers led the entire game until the Phillies tied it in the 9th. An error by Muncy in the bottom of the 10th allowed the tying and winning runs to score and the Phillies won 4–3, ending the Dodgers seven game winning streak. Nextup on the trip were the Washington Nationals at Nationals Park. Tyler Anderson struck out eight in eight scoreless innings and Freddie Freeman had three hits, including two doubles, as the Dodgers won 10–1 to start the series. The Dodgers hit four home runs, including two by Betts, as they beat the Nationals 9–4 the following day. The next day, Urías allowed only one run in six innings, but the Dodgers were held scoreless and lost 1–0, their first shutout loss of the season. Freeman had four hits, including a homer and two doubles, as the Dodgers took the opener of a series against the Diamondbacks at Chase Field, 14–1. The Dodgers hit three more home runs in the next game, a 6–4 victory. Betts had two hits including a home run on May 28, and in the process became the first Dodger batter to score 30 runs in a calendar month since Duke Snider in 1954. The Dodgers won 3–2. The Dodgers completed a four-game sweep of the Diamondbacks with a 3–1 win in the series finale. Will Smith homered in the game.

The Dodgers returned home on May 30 to play the Pirates. They trailed by four runs after the first three innings, came back to take the lead only to lose 6–5 when Craig Kimbrel blew the save opportunity. The Pirates won again the next day, 5–3 thanks to a two-run homer by Tucupita Marcano.

==== June ====
The Pirates finished off a sweep of the Dodgers with an 8–4 win on June 1, the first time the Dodgers had been swept in a three-game series at home since the 2018 season and the first time by the Pirates since the 2000 season. The New York Mets came to town for a four-game weekend series starting on June 2. In the opener, Tony Gonsolin allowed only two hits and one walk in six scoreless innings as the Dodgers ended the losing streak with a 2–0 win. Tyler Anderson followed that up with six scoreless innings and only three hits allowed the next day as the Dodgers won 6–1. In the next game, Walker Buehler had the shortest start of his career, recording only seven outs while allowing five runs to score as the Mets (thanks to two homers by Pete Alonso) won 9–4. The Mets won the next game, 5–4, in 10 innings to split the series.

The Dodgers traveled to Guaranteed Rate Field for a series with the Chicago White Sox. Mitch White allowed only two hits in five scoreless innings but the Dodgers failed to score and the bullpen faltered in a 4–0 loss. The following day, Gonsolin struck out five in six innings while allowing one run and the Dodgers hit three home runs in a 4–1 win. Max Muncy hit a three-run home run and drove in five runs overall in the Dodgers 11–9 win in the series finale. Darin Ruf hit two home runs and Buehler was lost to an injury as the San Francisco Giants beat the Dodgers, 7–2, at Oracle Park. The Giants proceeded to sweep the Dodgers by beating them 3–2 on June 11 and 2–0 on June 12. It was their first series sweep of the Dodgers since the 2016 season.

The Dodgers returned home on June 14 for a quick two-game series against the Los Angeles Angels. In the first game, Gonsolin allowed only one hit in 6 1/3 innings and Mookie Betts homered in a 2–0 win. In the second game, Anderson took a no-hit bid into the ninth inning with 123 pitches and finished with only one hit and one run allowed in 8 1/3 innings while Will Smith and Trea Turner homered in the 4–1 win. The Cleveland Guardians came to town for a weekend series and took the opener, 2–1, in 10 innings. Clayton Kershaw allowed five hits and one run in five innings but the Dodgers offense failed to do much on the day. In the next game, Julio Urías allowed only one unearned run in six innings while striking out six and the offense produced for a 7–1 win. Andrew Heaney returned from a lengthy injured list stint to strikeout seven while allowing only one earned run in five innings but the Guardians rallied against the Dodgers bullpen and won 5–3.

The Dodgers headed to Cincinnati for a three-game series at Great American Ballpark against the Reds. In the opener, Gonsolin allowed two runs in five innings and Freddie Freeman and five RBI in an 8–2 win. He homered in each of the next two games as the Dodgers won 8–4 and 10–5 to sweep the series. Next came a series at Truist Park against the Atlanta Braves. Urías struck out nine while only allowing one run in six innings and Trea Turner homered as the Dodgers took the opener, 4–1. The Braves took the next game, 5–3, with a two-run homer by Marcell Ozuna in the eighth making the difference. In the series finale, the Dodgers were trailing 2–0 into the ninth inning, when they rallied to tie the game on a two-run single by Trayce Thompson and then they won the game 5–3 in 11 innings. The Dodger traveled over night to Coors Field for a series with the Colorado Rockies. They forgot to bring the bats and lost the opener, 4–0, managing only three hits against Rockies starter Chad Kuhl who threw a complete game shutout. The Rockies won again, 7–4, the following day and then the Dodgers took the finale, 8–4, with a Freeman homer in the first setting the tone.

The Dodgers ended the month by beating the San Diego Padres at Dodger Stadium, 3–1, thanks to two home runs by Justin Turner.

==== July ====
July began with a 5–1 win over the Padres. Tony Gonsolin struck out eight and allowed only one run on four hits in 7 2/3 innings. The Dodgers hit three home runs in the first as they took the next game, 7–2. In the series finale, Clayton Kershaw allowed only four hits, and one walk while striking out eight batters in seven scoreless innings, but the Padres rallied to score four runs in the ninth inning to win, 4–2. Next up was a series with the Colorado Rockies beginning on Independence Day. Julio Urías struck out seven in six innings while only allowing one run. The Dodgers went ahead on a three-run home run by Trayce Thompson in the fifth inning and won 5–3 for their 50th win of the season. In the next game, Ryan Pepiot allowed one run while striking out six in five innings to pick up his first major league win in the Dodgers 5–2 victory. In the finale, Mitch White struck out six in 5 2/3 innings and the Dodgers win 2–1 on a walk-off hit by Mookie Betts. The Chicago Cubs came to town for the next series and the Dodgers won the first game 5–3 thanks to two home runs by Betts. In the next game, the Dodgers fell behind 3–0 only to rally to tie the game in the ninth and then won in the 10th on a walk-off hit by Will Smith. The Dodgers won again in the following game, 4–2, as Kershaw struck out 10 in 7 2/3 innings and Jake Lamb homered. In the final game of the homestand, the Dodgers fell behind to the Cubs 5–0 in the first inning only to comeback and win 11–9, with six runs in the third inning putting them ahead to stay. They swept the season series from the Cubs for the first time in franchise history. The Dodgers traveled to play the St. Louis Cardinals at Busch Stadium and saw the seven game winning streak come to an end in a 7–6 loss, despite four hits (including a home run) by Freddie Freeman. In the next game, the Dodgers fell behind 6–0 only to come from behind and win 7–6. The Dodgers took the final game of the series, 4–0, as Tyler Anderson pitched six scoreless innings, Gavin Lux homered and Freeman and Smith each had two hits, including a double. The Dodgers ended the first half of the season with a two-game series against the Los Angeles Angels at Angel Stadium. Kershaw took a perfect game into the eighth inning before giving up a double to Luis Rengifo and finished with just the one baserunner allowed in eight innings while striking out six. Smith had four hits and Justin Turner three as the Dodgers rolled to a 9–1 win. They won again the next day, 7–1. Urías struck out eight in seven innings, and the Dodgers hit four homers (two by Trea Turner) in the win. The Dodgers won their 60th game of the season, as they headed into the all-star break.

The Dodgers had six players selected for the 2022 Major League Baseball All-Star Game, which was played at Dodger Stadium. Kershaw, Betts and Trea Turner started, Freeman and Gonsolin also appeared in the game and Anderson was selected but did not play.

After the break, they began a four-game home series against the San Francisco Giants. Mitch White only allowed one hit in five scoreless innings and the Dodgers jumped out to a five run lead only for the Giants to tie it up in the seventh inning on a grand-slam home run by Darin Ruf. However, a three-run homer by Betts in the eighth put the Dodgers back on top for a 9–6 win. Anderson struck out six in six innings without allowing an earned run and Cody Bellinger hit the team's first grand slam of the season as the Dodgers took the next game, 5–1. In the third game, Urías pitched six scoreless innings and Betts, Trea Turner and Freeman all homered as the Dodgers continued their winning streak with a 4–2 victory. The Dodgers finished off the series sweep with a 7–4 win. It was their first four-game series sweep of the Giants since the 1995 season. The streak ended at eight games with a 4–1 loss to the Washington Nationals on July 25, which also was Tony Gonsolin's first recorded loss of the season. The Nationals broke open a tied game the following day with a two-run homer by Luis García Jr. in the eighth and went on to win 8–3. The Dodgers took the final game of the series, 7–1, scoring six in the first inning to put the game out of reach early.

The Dodgers went back on the road on July 28 to play the Rockies at Coors Field, winning the opener 13–0. Will Smith and Trayce Thompson homered as the Dodgers won 5–4 the following day. The Rockies came from behind to win the next game, 5–3. The Dodgers ended the month with a 7–3 win over the Rockies. James Outman, in his major league debut, had three hits, including a home run and a double.

==== August ====
The Dodgers began August with a four-game series against the San Francisco Giants at Oracle Park, winning the opener 8–2. Mookie Betts had three hits, including a home run, as the Dodgers took the next game, 9–5, for their 70th win of the season. Julio Urías pitched six scoreless innings in the next game as the Dodgers shut out the Giants, 3–0, with two of the runs driven in by Miguel Vargas in his major league debut. The Dodgers finished off the series with a 5–3 win and another four-game series sweep of the Giants, the first time they had done so in San Francisco since the 1977 season.

They returned home on August 5 for a series with the San Diego Padres and jumped out with four runs in the first en route to an 8–1 victory. Max Muncy hit a three-run home run to put the Dodgers ahead as they won the next game, 8–3. Cody Bellinger hit two home runs and the Dodgers swept the Padres, 4–0. Urías had another strong start on August 9 in the opener of a two-game series with the Minnesota Twins, striking out eight while only allowing one run in seven innings as the Dodgers won 10–3. The Dodgers extended their winning streak to 10 games and closed out the homestand with an 8–5 win over the Twins. Chris Taylor hit a home run in the sixth inning to put them ahead and then Joey Gallo hit a three-run homer in the seventh to extend the lead.

The Dodgers next began their next road trip at Kauffman Stadium against the Kansas City Royals. Tony Gonsolin took a no-hitter into the seventh inning, Trayce Thompson homered and the Dodgers kept the streak alive with an 8–3 win. They won again the next day, 13–3, in a game where they hit six home runs. It was the first time the Dodgers had won 12 games in a row since the 1976 season. The streak came to an end the following day when the Royals shut them out 4–0. Next up was a trip to American Family Field for a four-game series with the Milwaukee Brewers. Urías and four relievers shut out the Brewers, 4–0, in the first game of the series. The Dodgers hit three home runs in the next game, but lost 5–4, on a walk-off hit by Víctor Caratini off Craig Kimbrel in the 11th inning. Tony Gonsolin struck out eight while only allowing two hits in seven scoreless innings in the following game while Muncy and Austin Barnes homered to account for the Dodgers scoring in a 2–1 win. The Brewers won the final game, 5–3, to split the series.

Betts had three hits, including a double and triple as the Dodgers won the opening game of the next home stand, 2–1, over the Miami Marlins. Trayce Thompson made a game saving catch on a potential tying home run in the ninth. In the next game, Dustin May made his first start of the year after recovering from Tommy John surgery in May 2021. He struck out nine and only allowed one hit in five scoreless innings while Will Smith got things started with a three-run homer in the first and the Dodgers cruised to a 7–0 victory. The Dodgers finished off the sweep with a 10–3 win. However, they began the next series by being shut out, 4–0, by the Brewers. The Dodgers won the next game, 10–1, as Gonsolin picked up his 16th win of the season, Trea Turner and Freddie Freeman each had three hits and Trayce Thompson homered. In the last game of the series, Andrew Heaney struck out 10 in six innings, Austin Barnes homered and drove in four runs, and the Dodgers won 12–6.

The Dodgers traveled to LoanDepot Park for a four-game series with the Miami Marlins. Mookie Betts had four hits, including two home runs as they won the opener, 10–6, in 10 innings. Sandy Alcántara allowed only one run while striking out 10 in a complete game, 2–1, victory over the Dodgers in the next game, despite Betts hitting his 30th home run of the season. Betts had three more hits and a home run in the next game, and the Dodgers won 8–1. In the final game of the series, Will Smith hit a two-run home run in the second inning and the Dodgers won 3–2 in 10 innings. Next up was a trip to Citi Field to play the National League East leaders, the New York Mets. Heaney struck out eight in five innings and Gavin Lux drove in three runs in the Dodgers won 4–3 for their 90th victory of the season. They lost the next day, 2–1, as Jacob deGrom allowed only three hits and one run (a Betts homer) in seven innings while striking out nine.

==== September ====
Clayton Kershaw struck out six and only allowed one run on one hit in five innings but the Mets came from behind against the Dodgers bullpen and won, 5–3. It was the first time the Dodgers had dropped back-to-back games in 37 days.

The Dodgers returned home to play the San Diego Padres on September 2 and were blown out, 7–1. Dustin May gave up three multi-run homers in his five innings and the Dodgers were shut down by Yu Darvish, who struck out nine in seven innings. The Dodgers responded with four home runs as they routed the Padres 12–1 the following day. Home runs by Will Smith and Trayce Thompson led the Dodgers to a 9–4 win in the series finale. Andrew Heaney struggled in his next start, allowing six runs, on four homers, in 5 1/3 innings as the Dodgers lost to the San Francisco Giants, 7–4. Max Muncy hit two home runs and Joey Gallo one as the Dodgers took the next game, 6–3. Kershaw struck out eight in six innings and Muncy hit a three-run homer in the eighth inning as the Dodgers won the series finale, 7–3.

On September 9, The Dodgers traveled to Petco Park to play the Padres and lost, 5–4, in 10 innings. Julio Urías pitched seven innings while only allowing two runs and Freddie Freeman had four hits, including a home run and double, in an 8–4 win the following day. Justin Turner hit two home runs, including a grand slam, as the Dodgers won 11–2 on September 11 and clinched their 10th consecutive trip to the postseason. Next up was a trip to Chase Field to play the Arizona Diamondbacks. Tyler Anderson pitched seven scoreless innings and Mookie Betts homered as the Dodgers shut out the Diamondbacks, 6–0. The Dodgers won again the following day, 4–0, to clinch their 20th National League West title and ninth in ten years. Kershaw allowed only two hits in seven innings while Gallo and Freeman homered. It was the earliest the Dodgers had clinched the division since the franchise moved to Los Angeles. The Diamondbacks won the series finale, 5–3, on a walk-off three-run home run by Sergio Alcántara in the 10th inning. Next, they traveled to Oracle Park to face the Giants. Dustin May pitched five hitless innings and the Dodgers shut out the Giants, 5–0. Urías struck out eight in six innings and the Dodgers won 7–2 on September 18 to pick up their 100th win of the season, becoming the fastest team to reach that mark in franchise history (surpassing the 1899 and 1953 teams) and it was the fastest in MLB since the 2001 Mariners. The Dodgers finished off a sweep of the Giants with a 4–3 win in 10 innings. It was their 15th win against the Giants in 2022, the most wins against their rivals in a single season since 1953 and it was their 52nd road victory, setting a new franchise mark (eclipsing the 1952 team).

The Dodgers returned home on September 19 to play the Diamondbacks. Kershaw struck out 10 in six innings and Gallo and Chris Taylor homered in the 5–2 win that clinched a first round bye in the playoffs. The Dodgers and Diamondbacks played a scheduled doubleheader on September 20. In the first game, the Diamondbacks took a 5–1 lead early only to see the Dodgers score five runs in the eighth inning to win 6–5. Austin Barnes hit a two-run home run and singles by Smith, Thompson and Miguel Vargas drove in the rest of the runs. The Dodgers committed four errors in the sloppy nightcap, losing 5–2. The offense struggled the next day, managing only three hits in a 6–1 loss. Zac Gallen struck out 13 and held the Dodgers to two hits and one run through eight innings but they came back against the Diamondbacks bullpen. Betts drove in the winning run on a walk-off single in the bottom of the ninth. The St. Louis Cardinals came to town for a three-game series which they started by blowing out the Dodgers 11–0. The Cardinals hit five home runs, including two by Albert Pujols (the 699th and 700th of his career). The Dodgers hit three home runs the following day (including the first career one by Miguel Vargas) as they won 6–2. They wrapped up the series with a 4–1 victory over the Cardinals for their 106th victory, matching the franchise record, and becoming the first team ever to win 106 games in three consecutive full-length seasons and clinching the best record in the National League.

The Dodgers final road trip of the regular season was a three-game trip to San Diego to play the Padres. In the first game, they lost 4–3 when Craig Kimbrel walked Jorge Alfaro with the bases loaded in the 10th inning. In the next game, Urías and four relievers shutout the Padres and the Dodgers won when Freeman drove in the only run of the game on a single in the tenth inning for the Dodgers franchise record 107th win. Vargas had three RBI as the Dodgers finished up their short trip with a 5–2 win.

The Dodgers returned home to end the regular season with an unusual six-game series against the Colorado Rockies, that was made necessary by the need to make up games postponed because of the pre-season lockout. Kershaw pitched six shutout innings, Cody Bellinger hit a three-run homer, and the Dodgers cruised to a 10–1 win that clinched the best record in all of MLB and homefield advantage throughout the playoffs.

==== October ====
On October 1, the Dodgers rallied from three runs down to beat the Rockies 6–4 for their 110th win of the season, the first National League team to reach that mark since the 1909 Pittsburgh Pirates. Mookie Betts also had his 40th double of the season, and along with Freddie Freeman gave the Dodgers two players with 40 or more doubles for the first time since Johnny Frederick and Babe Herman did so for the 1930 Brooklyn Robins. Tyler Anderson struck out 10 in five innings the next day, but the Rockies beat the Dodgers 4–1. The Rockies won again the following day, 2–1, on a ninth inning run scoring single by Michael Toglia and then again, 5–2. In the final game of the regular season, Clayton Kershaw struck out nine in five innings and the Dodgers won 6–1 for their 111th win, the most in the majors since the 2001 Mariners and the most in the National League since the 1906 Cubs.

== Postseason ==
=== Game log ===
2022 Postseason Game Log: 1–3 (Home: 1–1; Away: 0–2)
National League Division Series: 1–3 (Home: 1–1; Away: 0–2)

#	Date	Opponent	Score	Win	Loss	Save	Attendance	Record
1	October 11	Padres	W 5–3	Urías (1–0)	Clevinger (0–1)	Martin (1)	52,407	1–0
2	October 12	Padres	L 3–5	Darvish (1–0)	Graterol (0–1)	Hader (1)	53,122	1–1
3	October 14	@ Padres	L 1–2	Snell (1–0)	Gonsolin (0–1)	Hader (2)	45,137	1–2
4	October 15	@ Padres	L 3–5	Hill (1–0)	Almonte (0–1)	Hader (3)	45,139	1–3

=== Postseason rosters ===
Playoff rosters
National League Division Series

- Pitchers: 7 Julio Urías 22 Clayton Kershaw 26 Tony Gonsolin 28 Andrew Heaney 31 Tyler Anderson 38 Yency Almonte 44 Tommy Kahnle 48 Brusdar Graterol 49 Blake Treinen 51 Alex Vesia 58 Chris Martin 59 Evan Phillips 85 Dustin May
- Catchers: 15 Austin Barnes 16 Will Smith
- Infielders: 5 Freddie Freeman 6 Trea Turner 9 Gavin Lux 10 Justin Turner 13 Max Muncy 71 Miguel Vargas
- Outfielders: 3 Chris Taylor 12 Joey Gallo 25 Trayce Thompson 35 Cody Bellinger 50 Mookie Betts

=== National League Division Series ===
The Dodgers opened the postseason by facing the San Diego Padres in the division series. Julio Urías made his first career post-season Game 1 start against Mike Clevinger of the Padres. Trea Turner homered in the first to give the Dodgers an early lead, which they added to quickly, scoring five runs off Clevinger in 2 2/3 innings. The Padres came back to score three runs in the fifth inning to tighten the game. It remained scoreless the rest of the way and the Dodgers won the first game, 5–3. Game 2 featured a matchup between Clayton Kershaw of the Dodgers and Yu Darvish of the Padres. Each team scored a run in the first inning on solo homers, by Manny Machado and Freddie Freeman. Max Muncy homered in the second to put the Dodgers up, but the Padres evened the score the following inning on a run scoring double by Machado and went ahead on a run scoring groundout by Jake Cronenworth. Trea Turner hit a home run in the bottom of the inning to tie it back up again. In the sixth, the Padres went ahead on a single by Jurickson Profar after Turner botched a potential inning ending double play opportunity. Jake Cronenworth homered off Blake Treinen in the eighth to extend the lead to two. The Padres bullpen held the lead and they won 5–3 to even up the series.

Tony Gonsolin started in Game 3, but only lasted 1 1/3 innings before being replaced by Andrew Heaney. He allowed four hits and one walk but only one run scored. Trent Grisham hit a solo home run off Heaney to put the Padres up by two, with the Dodgers getting a run on a Mookie Betts sacrifice fly in the fifth. Both bullpens pitched scoreless innings the rest of the game, with the Dodgers going 0 for 9 with men in scoring position to lose the game 2–1. In the fourth game, Tyler Anderson allowed only two hits in five scoreless innings and the Dodgers took a 3–0 lead on a two-run double by Freeman and a Will Smith sacrifice fly. However, the Padres rallied with a five run seventh inning against the Dodgers bullpen and won the game, 5–3, and the series, 3–1. It was a crushing defeat for the Dodgers after their historic season.

== Roster ==
2022 Los Angeles Dodgers
Roster
Pitchers: 38 Yency Almonte; 31 Tyler Anderson; 52 Phil Bickford; 63 Justin Bruihl; 21 Walker Buehler; 61 Garrett Cleavinger; 60 Robbie Erlin; 64 Caleb Ferguson; 26 Tony Gonsolin; 48 Brusdar Graterol; 25 Shane Greene; 78 Michael Grove; 28 Andrew Heaney; 56 Heath Hembree; 41 Daniel Hudson; 94 Andre Jackson; 44 Tommy Kahnle; 22 Clayton Kershaw; 46 Craig Kimbrel; 58 Chris Martin; 85 Dustin May; 45 Reyes Moronta; 47 Ryan Pepiot; 59 Evan Phillips; 33 David Price; 57 Jake Reed; 49 Blake Treinen; 7 Julio Urías; 51 Alex Vesia; 66 Mitch White	Catchers: 15 Austin Barnes; 16 Will Smith; 18 Tony Wolters; Infielders: 17 Hanser Alberto; 5 Freddie Freeman; 9 Gavin Lux; 13 Max Muncy; 43 Edwin Ríos; 10 Justin Turner; 6 Trea Turner; 71 Miguel Vargas	Outfielders: 37 Eddy Alvarez; 35 Cody Bellinger; 50 Mookie Betts; 12 Joey Gallo; 18 Jake Lamb; 8 Zach McKinstry; 77 James Outman; 11 Kevin Pillar; 3 Chris Taylor; 25 Trayce Thompson	Manager: 30 Dave Roberts; Coaches: 54 Josh Bard (bullpen); 65 Aaron Bates (assistant hitting); 73 Brant Brown (hitting); 82 Steve Cilladi (bullpen catcher); 91 Dino Ebel (third base); 88 Bob Geren (bench); 0 Danny Lehmann (game planning & communication); 86 Clayton McCullough (first base); 87 Connor McGuinness (assistant pitching); 99 Mark Prior (pitching); 72 Robert Van Scoyoc (hitting)

== Statistics ==
=== Batting ===
List does not include pitchers. Stats in bold are the team leaders.

Note: G = Games played; AB = At bats; R = Runs; H = Hits; 2B = Doubles; 3B = Triples; HR = Home runs; RBI = Runs batted in; BB = Walks; SO = Strikeouts; SB = Stolen bases; AVG = Batting average; OBP = On-base percentage; SLG = Slugging percentage; OPS = On base + slugging

Player	G	AB	R	H	2B	3B	HR	RBI	BB	SO	SB	AVG	OBP	SLG	OPS
Trea Turner	**160**	**652**	101	194	39	4	21	**100**	45	131	**27**	.298	.343	.466	.809
Freddie Freeman	159	612	**117**	**199**	**47**	2	21	**100**	84	102	13	**.325**	**.407**	.511	**.918**
Mookie Betts	142	572	**117**	154	40	3	**35**	82	55	104	12	.269	.340	**.533**	.873
Will Smith	137	508	68	132	26	3	24	87	56	96	1	.260	.343	.465	.808
Cody Bellinger	144	504	70	106	27	3	19	68	38	150	14	.210	.265	.389	.654
Justin Turner	128	468	61	130	36	0	13	81	50	89	3	.278	.350	.438	.788
Max Muncy	136	464	69	91	22	1	21	69	**90**	141	2	.196	.329	.384	.713
Gavin Lux	129	421	66	116	20	**7**	6	42	47	95	7	.276	.346	.399	.745
Chris Taylor	118	402	45	89	25	3	10	43	44	**160**	10	.221	.304	.373	.677
Trayce Thompson	74	205	35	55	14	1	13	39	30	86	4	.268	.364	.537	.901
Austin Barnes	62	179	31	38	6	0	8	26	27	37	2	.212	.324	.380	.704
Hanser Alberto	73	156	13	38	9	2	2	15	3	25	0	.244	.258	.365	.623
Joey Gallo	44	117	16	19	4	1	7	23	16	57	1	.162	.277	.393	.670
Edwin Ríos	27	86	12	21	1	0	7	17	5	36	0	.244	.293	.500	.793
Jake Lamb	25	67	10	16	5	1	2	4	8	24	0	.239	.338	.433	.771
Miguel Vargas	18	47	4	8	1	0	1	8	2	13	1	.170	.200	.255	.465
Eddy Alvarez	14	25	1	4	0	0	0	3	0	9	1	.160	.154	.160	.314
James Outman	4	13	6	6	2	0	1	3	2	7	0	.462	.563	.846	1.409
Kevin Pillar	4	12	1	1	1	0	0	0	1	4	0	.083	.154	.167	.321
Zach McKinstry	10	11	4	1	0	0	1	2	3	4	0	.091	.286	.364	.650
Tony Wolters	2	4	0	0	0	0	0	0	0	3	0	.000	.000	.000	.000
**Team totals**	**162**	**5526**	**847**	**1418**	**325**	**31**	**212**	**812**	**607**	**1374**	**98**	**.257**	**.333**	**.442**	**.775**

=== Pitching ===
List does not include position players. Stats in bold are the team leaders.

Note: W = Wins; L = Losses; ERA = Earned run average; G = Games pitched; GS = Games started; SV = Saves; IP = Innings pitched; H = Hits allowed; R = Runs allowed; ER = Earned runs allowed; BB = Walks allowed; K = Strikeouts

Player	W	L	ERA	G	GS	SV	IP	H	R	ER	BB	K
Tyler Anderson	15	5	2.57	30	28	0	**178.2**	**145**	**57**	**51**	34	138
Julio Urías	**17**	**7**	**2.16**	31	**31**	0	175.0	127	51	42	**41**	**166**
Tony Gonsolin	16	1	2.14	24	24	0	130.1	79	32	31	35	119
Clayton Kershaw	12	3	2.28	22	22	0	126.1	96	36	32	23	137
Andrew Heaney	4	4	3.10	16	14	0	72.2	60	34	25	19	110
Walker Buehler	6	3	4.02	12	12	0	65.0	67	30	29	17	58
Evan Phillips	7	3	1.14	**64**	0	2	63.0	33	11	8	15	77
Phil Bickford	2	1	4.72	60	0	0	61.0	53	33	32	14	67
Craig Kimbrel	6	**7**	3.75	63	0	**22**	60.0	51	31	25	28	72
Mitch White	1	2	3.70	15	10	0	56.0	51	25	23	19	47
Alex Vesia	5	0	2.15	63	0	1	54.1	37	14	13	24	79
Brusdar Graterol	2	4	3.26	46	1	4	49.2	39	20	18	10	43
David Price	2	0	2.45	40	0	2	40.1	38	11	11	9	37
Ryan Pepiot	3	0	3.47	9	7	0	36.1	26	15	14	27	42
Yency Almonte	0	0	1.02	33	0	1	35.1	18	4	4	10	33
Caleb Ferguson	1	0	1.82	37	1	0	34.2	23	9	7	17	37
Dustin May	2	3	4.50	6	6	0	30.0	21	17	15	14	29
Michael Grove	1	0	4.60	7	6	0	29.1	32	21	15	10	24
Chris Martin	3	1	1.46	26	0	2	24.2	12	4	4	1	34
Daniel Hudson	2	3	2.22	25	0	5	24.1	17	7	6	5	30
Justin Bruihl	1	1	3.80	24	0	1	23.2	22	11	10	6	13
Reyes Moronta	0	0	4.18	22	0	0	23.2	17	11	11	10	27
Tommy Kahnle	0	0	3.09	12	0	1	11.2	5	4	4	3	14
Andre Jackson	0	0	1.86	4	0	1	9.2	9	3	2	4	9
Heath Hembree	1	1	7.94	6	0	0	5.2	9	6	5	3	5
Blake Treinen	1	1	1.80	5	0	0	5.0	1	1	1	1	6
Jake Reed	0	0	1.93	5	0	1	4.2	6	1	1	1	2
Garrett Cleavinger	0	1	10.38	4	0	0	4.1	6	7	5	3	7
Robbie Erlin	0	0	9.00	2	0	0	2.0	2	2	2	1	1
Shane Greene	1	0	0.00	1	0	0	2.0	2	0	0	0	1
**Team totals**	**111**	**51**	**2.80**	**162**	**162**	**43**	**1451.1**	**1114**	**513**	**451**	**407**	**1465**

== Awards and honors ==
Recipient	Award	Date awarded	Ref.
Cody Bellinger	National League Player of the Week Award (April 18–24)	April 25, 2022	
Freddie Freeman	National League Player of the Week Award (June 20–26)	June 27, 2022	
Mookie Betts	2022 Major League Baseball All-Star Game (starter)	July 8, 2022	
Trea Turner	2022 Major League Baseball All-Star Game (starter)	July 8, 2022	
Tony Gonsolin	2022 Major League Baseball All-Star Game	July 10, 2022	
Clayton Kershaw	2022 Major League Baseball All-Star Game (starter)	July 10, 2022	
Tyler Anderson	2022 Major League Baseball All-Star Game	July 16, 2022	
Freddie Freeman	2022 Major League Baseball All-Star Game	July 17, 2022	
Freddie Freeman	National League Player of the Week Award (July 11–17)	July 18, 2022	
Mookie Betts	National League Player of the Week Award (August 22–28)	August 29, 2022	
Freddie Freeman	National League Player of the Week Award (September 5–11)	September 12, 2022	
Mookie Betts	Fielding Bible Award (Right field)	October 27, 2022	
Justin Turner	Roberto Clemente Award	October 31, 2022	
Mookie Betts	Golden Glove Award (Right field)	November 1, 2022	
Mookie Betts	Silver Slugger Award (Outfield)	November 10, 2022	
Trea Turner	Silver Slugger Award (Shortstop)	November 10, 2022	
Mookie Betts	All-MLB Team	December 5, 2022	
Trea Turner	All-MLB Team	December 5, 2022	
Freddie Freeman	All-MLB Team (second team)	December 5, 2022	
Will Smith	All-MLB Team (second team)	December 5, 2022	
Julio Urías	All-MLB Team (second team)	December 5, 2022	

== Transactions ==
=== April ===
- On April 7, placed LHPs Victor González and Caleb Ferguson and RHP Tommy Kahnle on the 10-day injured list.
- On April 17, optioned LHP Garrett Cleavinger to AAA Oklahoma City and recalled RHP Phil Bickford from AAA Oklahoma City.
- On April 20, placed LHP Andrew Heaney on the 10-day injured list with left shoulder discomfort and recalled IF/OF Zach McKinstry from AAA Oklahoma City.
- On April 22, placed RHP Blake Treinen on the 10-day injured list with right shoulder discomfort and recalled LHP Garrett Cleavinger from AAA Oklahoma City.
- On April 24, purchased the contract of RHP Reyes Moronta from AAA Oklahoma City, designated LHP Darien Nuñez for assignment and placed LHP David Price on the 10-day injured list.
- On April 25, recalled RHP Andre Jackson from AAA Oklahoma City and optioned IF/OF Zach McKinstry to AAA Oklahoma City.
- On April 30, placed RHP Mitch White on the COVID-19 injured list, recalled IF/OF Zach McKinstry from AAA Oklahoma City, purchased the contract of RHP Carson Fulmer from AAA Oklahoma City and optioned RHP Andre Jackson to AAA Oklahoma City.

=== May ===
- On May 1, activated RHP Tommy Kahnle from the 10-day injured list and optioned LHP Garrett Cleavinger to AAA Oklahoma City.
- On May 2, optioned IF/OF Zach McKinstry to AAA Oklahoma City and designated RHP Carson Fulmer for assignment.
- On May 7, purchased the contract of LHP Robbie Erlin from AAA Oklahoma City.
- On May 8, optioned LHP Justin Bruihl to AAA Oklahoma City.
- On May 11, purchased the contract of RHP Ryan Pepiot from AAA Oklahoma City and designated LHP Robbie Erlin for assignment.
- On May 12, optioned RHP Ryan Pepiot to AAA Oklahoma City and purchased the contract of RHP Yency Almonte from AAA Oklahoma City.
- On May 13, placed LHP Clayton Kershaw on the 15-day injured list with right SI joint inflammation and recalled LHP Garrett Cleavinger from AAA Oklahoma City.
- On May 15, recalled RHP Michael Grove from AA Tulsa, purchased the contract of RHP Shane Greene from AAA Oklahoma City, optioned LHP Garrett Cleavinger and RHP Reyes Moronta to AAA Oklahoma City and transferred LHP Victor González from the 10-day injured list to the 60-day injured list.
- On May 16, activated LHP Caleb Ferguson from the 10-day injured list and optioned RHP Michael Grove to AAA Oklahoma City.
- On May 17, recalled RHP Ryan Pepiot from Class-A Rancho Cucamonga, recalled LHP Justin Bruihl from AAA Oklahoma City, optioned LHP Caleb Ferguson to AAA Oklahoma City, activated RHP Mitch White from the COVID-19 related injured list, placed RHP Tommy Kahnle on the 15-day injured list with right forearm inflammation and transferred RHP Blake Treinen from the 10-day injured list to the 60-day injured list. Activated LHP David Price from the COVID-19 related injured list and designated RHP Shane Greene for assignment.
- On May 18, optioned RHP Ryan Pepiot to AAA Oklahoma City.
- On May 27, recalled RHP Ryan Pepiot from AAA Oklahoma City and optioned RHP Phil Bickford to AAA Oklahoma City.
- On May 28, optioned RHP Ryan Pepiot to AAA Oklahoma City, placed IF Max Muncy on the 10-day injured list with left elbow inflammation, recalled RHP Michael Grove from AAA Oklahoma City, purchased the contract of OF Kevin Pillar from AAA Oklahoma City and transferred RHP Tommy Kahnle from the 15-day injured list to the 60-day injured list.

=== June ===
- On June 2, optioned RHP Michael Grove to AAA Oklahoma City, placed OF Kevin Pillar on the 10-day injured list with a fractured left shoulder and recalled LHP Caleb Ferguson and IF/OF Zach McKinstry from AAA Oklahoma City.
- On June 3, placed IF Edwin Ríos on the 10-day injured list with a right hamstring strain, purchased the contract of IF Eddy Alvarez from AAA Oklahoma City and transferred OF Kevin Pillar from the 10-day injured list to the 60-day injured list.
- On July 7, placed RHP Craig Kimbrel on paternity leave and recalled RHP Phil Bickford from AAA Oklahoma City.
- On June 9, activated IF Max Muncy from the 10-day injured list and optioned IF/OF Zach McKinstry to AAA Oklahoma City.
- On June 10, activated RHP Craig Kimbrel from paternity leave and optioned RHP Mitch White to AAA Oklahoma City.
- On June 11, activated LHP Clayton Kershaw from the 15-day injured list and optioned LHP Justin Bruihl to AAA Oklahoma City. Placed RHP Walker Buehler on the 15-day injured list with a right forearm strain and recalled RHP Michael Grove from AAA Oklahoma City.
- On June 14, optioned RHP Michael Grove to AAA Oklahoma City and recalled RHP Reyes Moronta from AAA Oklahoma City.
- On June 19, activated LHP Andrew Heaney from the 10-day injured list, placed OF Mookie Betts on the 10-day injured list with a right rib fracture, recalled IF/OF Zach McKinstry from AAA Oklahoma City and optioned RHP Reyes Moronta to AAA Oklahoma City.
- On June 21, purchased the contract of OF Trayce Thompson from AAA Oklahoma City, placed LHP Caleb Ferguson on the 15-day injured list with left forearm tendinitis and transferred RHP Walker Buehler from the 15-day injured list to the 60-day injured list.
- On June 22, placed IF Hanser Alberto on the paternity list, purchased the contract of OF Stefen Romero from AAA Oklahoma City, and transferred 3B Edwin Ríos from the 10-day injured list to the 60-day injured list.
- On June 24, placed LHP Andrew Heaney on the 15-day injured list with left shoulder inflammation and recalled RHP Reyes Moronta from AAA Oklahoma City.
- On June 25, placed RHP Daniel Hudson on the 15-day injured list with a torn anterior cruciate ligament, recalled IF Hanser Alberto from the paternity list and RHP Mitch White from AAA Oklahoma City and designated OF Stefen Romero for assignment.
- On June 28, placed IF/OF Zach McKinstry on the 10-day injured list with neck stiffness and purchased the contract of IF Jake Lamb from AAA Oklahoma City.
- On June 30, claimed RHP Ian Gibaut off waivers from the Cleveland Guardians and transferred RHP Daniel Hudson from the 15-day injured list to the 60-day injured list. Placed LHP David Price on the family medical emergency list and recalled LHP Justin Bruihl from AAA Oklahoma City.

=== July ===
- On July 1, activated RHP Ian Gibaut and optioned LHP Justin Bruihl to AAA Oklahoma City.
- On July 3, activated OF Mookie Betts from the 10-day injured list and LHP David Price from the family medical emergency list, optioned IF/OF Eddy Alvarez to AAA Oklahoma City, and designated RHP Ian Gibaut for assignment.
- On July 5, recalled RHP Ryan Pepiot from AAA Oklahoma City and optioned RHP Reyes Moronta to AAA Oklahoma City.
- On July 6, placed IF/OF Chris Taylor on the 10-day injured list with a fractured left foot, activated LHP Caleb Ferguson from the 15-day injured list and IF/OF Zach McKinstry from the 10-day injured list and optioned RHP Ryan Pepiot to AAA Oklahoma City.
- On July 13, claimed RHP Jake Reed off waivers from the New York Mets and optioned him to AAA Oklahoma City.
- On July 14, placed RHP Brusdar Graterol on the 15-day injured list, retroactive to July 11 with right shoulder inflammation, and recalled RHP Reyes Moronta from AAA Oklahoma City.
- On July 26, optioned RHP Reyes Moronta to AAA Oklahoma City and recalled LHP Garrett Cleavinger from AAA Oklahoma City.
- On July 27, activated LHP Andrew Heaney from the 15-day injured list, optioned RHP Mitch White and LHP Garrett Cleavinger to AAA Oklahoma City, and recalled RHP Jake Reed from AAA Oklahoma City.
- On July 30, acquired RHP Chris Martin from the Chicago Cubs in exchange for IF/OF Zach McKinstry, recalled OF James Outman from AAA Oklahoma City.
- On July 31, activated RHP Chris Martin and optioned RHP Jake Reed to AAA Oklahoma City.

=== August ===
- On August 1, traded LHP Garrett Cleavinger to the Tampa Bay Rays in exchange for minor league OF German Tapia.
- On August 2, acquired OF Joey Gallo from the New York Yankees in exchange for minor league pitcher Clayton Beeter. Traded IF/OF Jake Lamb to the Seattle Mariners in exchange for cash considerations. Traded RHP Mitch White and minor leaguer Alex De Jesus to the Toronto Blue Jays in exchange for minor leaguers Nick Frasso and Moises Brito. Purchased the contract of IF Miguel Vargas from AAA Oklahoma City. Placed 3B Justin Turner on the 10-day injured list with abdominal tightness.
- On August 5, placed LHP Clayton Kershaw on the 15-day injured list with lower back pain, activated IF/OF Chris Taylor from the 10-day injured list, recalled LHP Reyes Moronta from AAA Oklahoma City, and optioned OF James Outman to AAA Oklahoma City.
- On August 7, placed RHP Yency Almonte on the 15-day injured list with right elbow tightness and recalled RHP Andre Jackson from AAA Oklahoma City.
- On August 8, claimed IF Rylan Bannon off waivers from the Baltimore Orioles and optioned him to AAA Oklahoma City.
- On August 9, activated 3B Justin Turner from the 10-day injured list and optioned IF Miguel Vargas to AAA Oklahoma City.
- On August 10, recalled RHP Ryan Pepiot from AAA Oklahoma City and optioned RHP Andre Jackson to AAA Oklahoma City.
- On August 12, placed C Austin Barnes on the family emergency leave list, purchased the contract of C Tony Wolters from AAA Oklahoma City and designated IF Rylan Bannon for assignment.
- On August 15, reinstated C Austin Barnes from the family emergency leave list and designated C Tony Wolters for assignment.
- On August 17, activated IF Edwin Ríos from the 60-day injured list and optioned him to AAA Oklahoma City.
- On August 20, activated RHP Dustin May from the 60-day injured list and designated RHP Reyes Moronta for assignment.
- On August 22, activated RHP Brusdar Graterol from the 15-day injured list and optioned RHP Ryan Pepiot to AAA Oklahoma City.
- On August 29, placed RHP Tony Gonsolin on the 15-day injured list with right forearm strain and recalled RHP Michael Grove from AAA Oklahoma City.
- On August 30, optioned RHPs Michael Grove and Phil Bickford to AAA Oklahoma City, recalled RHP Jake Reed from AAA Oklahoma City, purchased the contract of RHP Heath Hembree from AAA Oklahoma City and designated IF Eddy Alvarez for assignment.

=== September ===
- On September 1, activated LHP Clayton Kershaw from the 15-day injured list, placed RHP Brusdar Graterol on the 15-day injured list with right elbow inflammation and recalled RHP Phil Bickford and IF Miguel Vargas from AAA Oklahoma City.
- On September 2, activated RHP Blake Treinen from the 60-day injured list and designated RHP Jake Reed for assignment.
- On September 4, placed LHP David Price on the 15-day injured list with left wrist inflammation and recalled RHP Ryan Pepiot from AAA Oklahoma City.
- On September 5, optioned RHP Ryan Pepiot to AAA Oklahoma City and recalled LHP Justin Bruihl from AAA Oklahoma City.
- On September 10, placed RHP Blake Treinen on the 15-day injured list with right shoulder tightness and recalled RHP Andre Jackson from AAA Oklahoma City.
- On September 13, activated RHP Tommy Kahnle from the 60-day injured list and designated RHP Heath Hembree for assignment.
- On September 14, recalled RHP Michael Grove from AAA Oklahoma City and optioned RHP Andre Jackson to AAA Oklahoma City.
- On September 17, placed LHP Tyler Anderson on paternity leave and recalled RHP Andre Jackson from AAA Oklahoma City.
- On September 20, activated LHP Tyler Anderson from the paternity list, recalled RHP Ryan Pepiot from AAA Oklahoma City as the extra man for a doubleheader and optioned RHP Andre Jackson to AAA Oklahoma City.
- On September 22, activated RHP Brusdar Graterol from the 15-day injured list and optioned LHP Justin Bruihl to AAA Oklahoma City.
- On September 25, placed RHP Dustin May on the 15-day injured list with lower back tightness and recalled RHP Andre Jackson from AAA Oklahoma City.
- On September 27, activated LHP David Price from the 15-day injured list and optioned RHP Andre Jackson to AAA Oklahoma City.
- On September 28, activated RHP Yency Almonte from the 15-day injured list and placed RHP Phil Bickford on the 15-day injured list with right shoulder fatigue.

=== October ===
- On October 2, placed RHP Michael Grove on the 15-day injured list with a left knee contusion and recalled RHP Andre Jackson from AAA Oklahoma City.
- On October 3, activated RHP Tony Gonsolin from the 15-day injured list and optioned RHP Andre Jackson to AAA Oklahoma City.
- On October 6, recalled IF Jacob Amaya from AAA Oklahoma City and placed him on the 60-day injured list, purchased the contract of RHP Beau Burrows from AAA Oklahoma City and assigned him to AAA Oklahoma City.

== Farm system ==
Level	Team	League	Manager	W	L	Position
AAA	Oklahoma City Dodgers	Pacific Coast League (East Division)	Travis Barbary	84	66	2nd place
AA	Tulsa Drillers	Texas League (North Division)	Scott Hennessey	69	67	3rd place Lost in playoffs
High A	Great Lakes Loons	Midwest League (East Division)	Austin Chubb	76	55	2nd Place; Lost in playoffs
Low A	Rancho Cucamonga Quakes	California League (South Division)	John Shoemaker	68	64	3rd Place
Rookie	ACL Dodgers	Arizona Complex League (West Division)	Jair Fernandez	25	29	5th place
Foreign Rookie	DSL Dodgers Bautista	Dominican Summer League (Northwest Division)	Dunior Zerpa	34	25	3rd place
Foreign Rookie	DSL Dodgers Mega	Dominican Summer League (Northwest Division)	Cordell Hipolito	37	22	1st place

=== Minor League awards and honors ===
- All-Star Futures Game

Pitcher Bobby Miller
Catcher Diego Cartaya
Infielder Miguel Vargas

- Branch Ricky Minor League Players of the Year

Pitcher Gavin Stone
Player Diego Cartaya

- Baseball America Minor League All-Star team

Pitcher Gavin Stone

- Baseball America Triple-A All-Stars

Player of the Year Miguel Vargas
Starting Pitcher Ryan Pepiot
Third Baseman Miguel Vargas

- Baseball America Double-A All-Stars

Pitcher of the Year Gavin Stone
Starting Pitcher Gavin Stone

- Pacific Coast League Post-Season All-Stars

Outfielder Jason Martin
Top Major League Prospect Miguel Vargas

- Midwest League Post-Season All-Stars

Infielder Jorbit Vivas
Designated Hitter Imanol Vargas
Manager of the Year Austin Chubb

- California League Post-Season All-Stars

Outfielder Damon Keith

- Arizona Complex League Post-Season All-Stars

Catcher Thayron Liranzo

- Dominican Summer League Post-Season All-Stars

Outfielder Josue De Paula
Outfielder Samuel Muñoz

== Major League Baseball draft ==
The 2022 Draft was held July 17–19, 2022. The Dodgers had their first pick dropped from the first round to the second as a result of being in the highest tier of competitive balance tax during the 2021 season. They also lost their normal second round pick and their fifth round pick as a result of signing free agent Freddie Freeman but gained a fifth round pick for losing Corey Seager to free agency. The top pick in this draft was catcher Dalton Rushing from the University of Louisville, who is one of two players from this draft class to play in the majors as of 2025.

2022 draft picks

Round	Name	Position	School	Signed	Career span	Highest level
2	Dalton Rushing	C	University of Louisville	Yes	2022–present	MLB
3	Alex Freeland	SS	University of Central Florida	Yes	2022–present	MLB
4	Nick Biddison	OF	Virginia Tech	Yes	2022–present	AAA
5	Sean McLain	SS	Arizona State University	Yes	2022–present	AA
6	Logan Wagner	SS	P27 Academy H.S	Yes	2022–present	AA
7	Chris Campos	SS	Saint Mary's College of California	Yes	2022–present	AAA
8	Taylor Young	2B	Louisiana Tech University	Yes	2022–present	AAA
9	Brandon Neeck	LHP	University of Virginia	Yes	2023–present	AAA
10	Simon Reid	C	Westmont College	Yes	2022–2024	A
11	Kyle Nevin	OF	Baylor University	Yes	2022–present	AA
12	Jacob Meador	RHP	Dallas Baptist University	Yes	2022–2025	AA
13	Chris Newell	OF	University of Virginia	Yes	2022–present	AAA
14	Jose Izarra	SS	Florida SouthWestern State College	Yes	2022–present	AA
15	Nico Perez	SS	B You Academy	Yes	2022–present	A+
16	Jared Karros	RHP	UCLA	Yes	2023–present	AA
17	Payton Martin	RHP	West Forsyth High School	Yes	2023–present	AA
18	Cameron Decker	SS	Evansville North High School	Yes	2022–present	A+
19	Bubba Alleyne	OF	University of Maryland	Yes	2022–2025	AA
20	Carter McCulley	SS	Pensacola Catholic High School	No		
