= Jason Martin (baseball) =

American baseball player (born 1995)

- Outfielder
- Born: September 5, 1995 (age 31); Corona, California, U.S.
- Batted: Left Threw: Right

Professional debut
- MLB: April 6, 2019, for the Pittsburgh Pirates
- KBO: April 1, 2023, for the NC Dinos

Last appearance
- MLB: September 13, 2021, for the Texas Rangers
- KBO: November 5, 2023, for the NC Dinos

MLB statistics
- Batting average: .206
- Home runs: 6
- Runs batted in: 19

KBO statistics
- Batting average: .283
- Home runs: 17
- Runs batted in: 90
- Stats at Baseball Reference

Teams
- Pittsburgh Pirates (2019–2020); Texas Rangers (2021); NC Dinos (2023)

Jason Martin (born September 5, 1995) is an American former professional baseball outfielder. He played in Major League Baseball (MLB) for the Pittsburgh Pirates, Texas Rangers, and in the KBO League for the NC Dinos.

== Amateur career ==
Martin attended Orange Lutheran High School in Orange, California.

== Professional career ==
=== Houston Astros ===
He was drafted by the Houston Astros in the eighth round of the 2013 Major League Baseball draft. He signed and spent 2013 with the Gulf Coast Astros where he batted .251 with 17 RBIs and 11 stolen bases in 50 games. In 2014, he played for both the Greeneville Astros and Tri-City ValleyCats, slashing .257/.338/.384 with one home run and 23 RBIs in 63 total games between the two teams, and in 2015, he played with the Quad Cities River Bandits where he compiled a .270 batting average with eight home runs and 57 RBIs in 105 games. Martin spent 2016 with the Lancaster JetHawks and slashed .270/.357/.533 with 23 home runs and 75 RBIs in 110 games.

After the 2016 season, Martin played for the Glendale Desert Dogs of the Arizona Fall League. In 2017, he played for the Buies Creek Astros and Corpus Christi Hooks and batted .278 with 18 home runs, 66 RBIs, 35 doubles, and 16 stolen bases in 125 games.

=== Pittsburgh Pirates ===
On January 13, 2018, Martin was traded to the Pittsburgh Pirates (along with Joe Musgrove, Colin Moran and Michael Feliz) for Gerrit Cole. He began 2018 with the Double–A Altoona Curve and was promoted to the Triple–A Indianapolis Indians in June. In 127 total games between the two teams, he slashed .274/.337/.429 with 13 home runs and 55 RBI.

The Pirates added Martin to their 40-man roster after the season to protect him from the Rule 5 draft. On April 5, 2019, Martin was promoted to the major leagues for the first time. He made his major league debut on April 6, recording a single versus Tanner Roark in his first major league at–bat. Martin joined Andrew McCutchen and José Tábata as the only Pirates since 1948 to record a hit, a run, and a stolen base in their Major League debut. In his rookie season, Martin collected nine hits in 40 trips to the plate. On October 18, Martin underwent surgery to repair a left shoulder labral tear.

Martin only appeared in 7 games in 2020, going hitless in 9 at–bats. On October 30, 2020, Martin was outrighted off of the 40-man roster. He became a free agent on November 2.

=== Texas Rangers ===
On December 14, 2020, Martin signed a minor league contract with the Texas Rangers organization. On May 26, 2021, Martin was selected to the active roster. He hit first MLB home run, a 2-run homer, against Los Angeles Dodgers second baseman Andy Burns on June 12. Over 58 games for Texas in 2021, Martin hit .208/.248/.354 with six home runs and 17 RBI. On October 9, Martin elected free agency.

=== Los Angeles Dodgers ===
On November 23, 2021, Martin signed a minor league contract with the Los Angeles Dodgers. He spent the season with the Triple-A Oklahoma City Dodgers, where he played in 129 games, with a .285 batting average, 32 home runs and 107 RBI. Martin elected free agency following the season on November 10, 2022.

=== NC Dinos ===
On December 3, 2022, Martin signed a contract with the NC Dinos of the KBO League. He played in 118 games for the Dinos in 2023, batting .283/.360/.455 with 17 home runs, 90 RBI, and 15 stolen bases. He became a free agent following the season.

=== Los Angeles Angels ===
On February 9, 2024, Martin signed a minor league contract with the Los Angeles Angels. In 70 appearances for the Triple-A Salt Lake Bees, he batted .286/.364/.517 with 13 home runs, 45 RBI, and five stolen bases. Martin elected free agency following the season on November 4.
