= Diego Cartaya =

Venezuelan baseball player (born 2001)

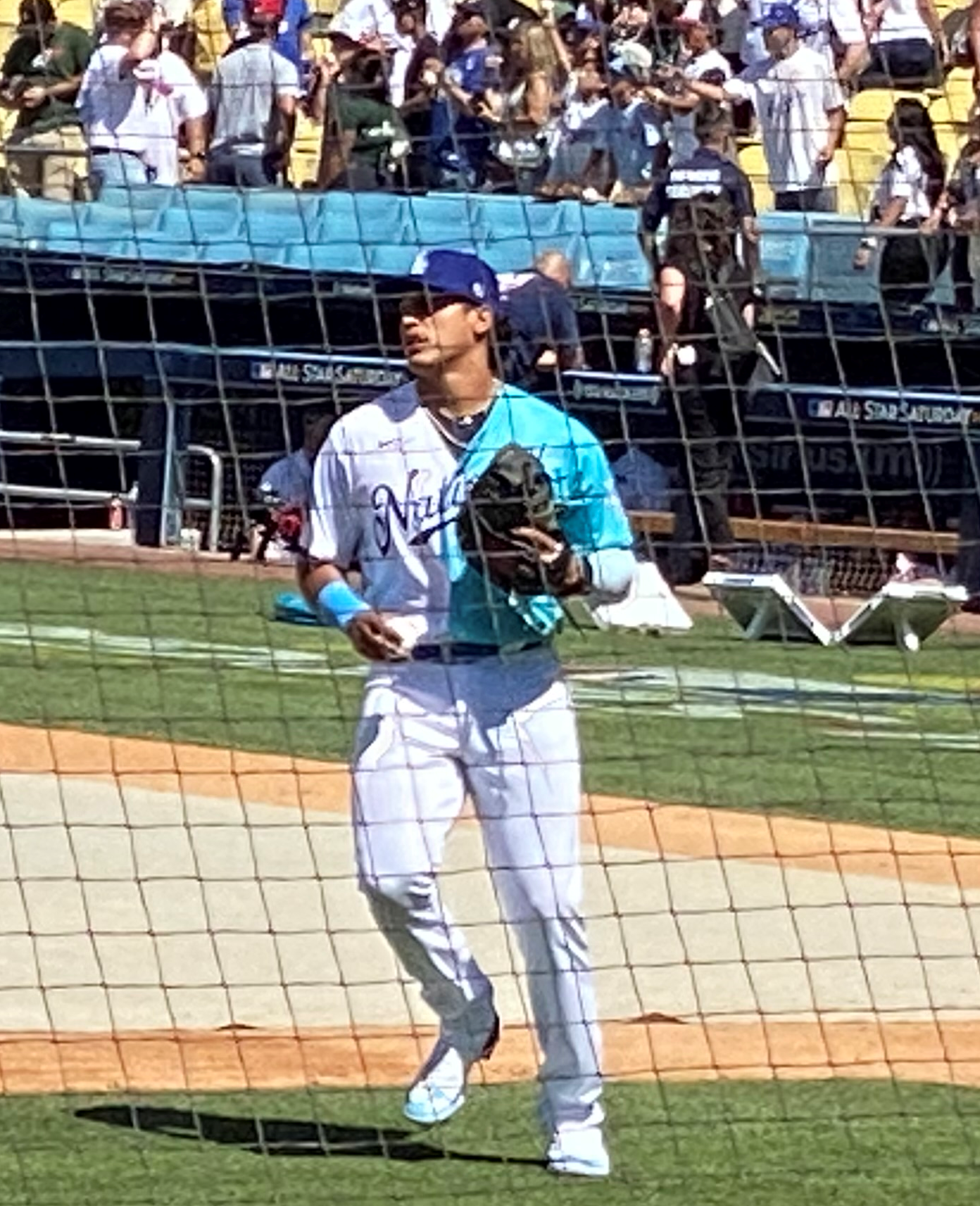
- Cartaya at the 2022 All-Star Futures Game

Free agent
- Catcher
- Born: September 7, 2001 (age 24); Maracay, Venezuela
- Bats: Right Throws: Right
- Stats at Baseball Reference

Diego Armando Cartaya (born September 7, 2001) is a Venezuelan professional baseball catcher who is a free agent.

== Career ==
=== Los Angeles Dodgers ===
Cartaya was rated as MLB Pipeline's top international prospect when he signed with the Los Angeles Dodgers on July 2, 2018. He made his professional debut in 2019 with the Dodgers Arizona League affiliates, hitting .281 in 41 games. He was rated as the Dodgers ninth best prospect going into the 2020 season. and was added to the Dodgers 60-man player pool for the pandemic affected season. In 2021, with the Rancho Cucamonga Quakes he appeared in 31 games and hit .298 with 10 homers and 31 RBI. However, he was placed on the injured list on August 1 with a strained hamstring and missed the rest of the season. He was selected to represent the Dodgers at the 2022 All-Star Futures Game. Cartaya was selected by the Dodgers as their 2022 Branch Rickey Minor League Player of the Year. He appeared in 33 games for the Quakes and 62 games for the Great Lakes Loons, hitting a combined .254 with 22 home runs and 72 RBI.

On November 15, 2022, the Dodgers added Cartaya to their 40-man roster to protect him from the Rule 5 draft, and assigned him to the Double-A Tulsa Drillers to begin the 2023 season. With Tulsa, he played in 93 games, hitting .189 with 19 homers and 57 RBI. Cartaya was again optioned to Double-A Tulsa to begin the 2024 season. He was promoted to the Triple-A Oklahoma City Baseball Club on June 25. Between the two levels, he played in 95 games, batting .221 with 11 homers and 52 RBI. Cartaya was designated for assignment on January 3, 2025 and removed from the roster.

Following the 2024 season, Cartaya played winter league baseball for the Tiburones de La Guaira of the Venezuelan Professional Baseball League.

=== Minnesota Twins ===
On January 9, 2025, the Dodgers traded Cartaya to the Minnesota Twins in exchange for minor leaguer Jose Vasquez. He was optioned to the Triple-A St. Paul Saints to begin the season. On April 25, Cartaya was removed from the 40-man roster and sent outright to St. Paul. He was released on July 23 after batting just .085 in 20 games with one home run and one RBI.

=== San Francisco Giants ===
On July 29, 2025, Cartaya signed a minor league contract with the San Francisco Giants. He made four appearances for the Single-A San Jose Giants, going 4-for-17 (.235) with one home run and five RBI.

In 2026, Cartaya appeared in 10 games with the High-A Eugene Emeralds, batting .107/.286/.214 with one home run and one RBI. Cartaya was released by the Giants organization on April 25, 2026.
