= Victor González (baseball) =

Mexican baseball player (born 1995)

Diablos Rojos del México – No. 12
- Pitcher
- Born: November 16, 1995 (age 31); Tuxpan, Nayarit, Mexico
- Bats: Left Throws: Left

MLB debut
- July 31, 2020, for the Los Angeles Dodgers

MLB statistics (through 2024 season)
- Win–loss record: 11–5
- Earned run average: 3.09
- Strikeouts: 92
- Stats at Baseball Reference

Teams
- Los Angeles Dodgers (2020–2021, 2023); New York Yankees (2024)

Career highlights and awards
- World Series champion (2020)

Victor Aaron González (born November 16, 1995) is a Mexican professional baseball pitcher for the Diablos Rojos del México of the Mexican League. He has previously played in Major League Baseball (MLB) for the Los Angeles Dodgers and New York Yankees.

== Career ==
=== Los Angeles Dodgers ===
==== Minor leagues ====
González signed with the Los Angeles Dodgers as an international free agent on July 2, 2012. He began his professional career with the Arizona League Dodgers in 2013, going 3–2 with a 3.79 ERA over 38 innings.

He spent the 2014 season with the Ogden Raptors, going 4–5 with a 6.09 ERA over 54 2/3 innings. He split the 2015 season between the AZL Dodgers, Ogden, and the Great Lakes Loons, and went a combined 1–7 with a 5.43 ERA over 66 1/3 innings.

González returned to Great Lakes in 2016, going 3–6 with a 4.66 ERA over 94 2/3 innings. He missed all of the 2017 season due to an injury. González split the 2018 season between Ogden and Great Lakes, going a combined 1–5 with a 7.49 ERA over 33 2/3 innings. He split the 2019 season between the Rancho Cucamonga Quakes, Tulsa Drillers, and Oklahoma City Dodgers, going a combined 5–2 with a 2.31 ERA over 89 2/3 innings in 38 games (13 starts). The Dodgers added González to their 40-man roster on October 31, 2019.

==== Major leagues ====
González was called up to the MLB roster for the first time on July 30, 2020. He made his major league debut on July 31 against the Arizona Diamondbacks. He pitched 20 1/3 innings in 15 games (one start) for the Dodgers in 2020, winning three games and finishing with a 1.33 ERA and 23 strikeouts with only three walks. In the postseason, González pitched 6 2/3 innings across eight games and allowed two runs on five hits and four walks while striking out five. He was the winning pitcher in the deciding Game 6 of the 2020 World Series.

On April 17, 2021, González picked up his first big league save against the San Diego Padres. He pitched 35 1/3 innings for the Dodgers over 44 games during the 2021 season with a 3–1 record and 3.57 ERA. He struck out 33 but also had a high number of walks with 19.

González began the 2022 season the injured list with left elbow inflammation. On May 8, it was announced that he was going to undergo arthroscopic surgery and would miss a couple more months. He did not play for the Dodgers in 2022.

González was optioned to Triple-A Oklahoma City to begin the 2023 season and recalled to the majors on April 22. He pitched in 34 games in the majors with a 4.01 ERA and in 20 games for Oklahoma City for a 5.40 ERA.

=== New York Yankees ===
On December 11, 2023, the Dodgers traded González and Jorbit Vivas to the New York Yankees in exchange for Trey Sweeney. In 27 games for the Yankees, he compiled a 3.86 ERA with 11 strikeouts and 2 saves across 23 1/3 innings. On June 21, 2024, González was designated for assignment by New York. He cleared waivers and was sent outright to the Triple–A Scranton/Wilkes-Barre RailRiders on June 26. González was released by the Yankees organization on September 15.

=== Los Angeles Angels ===
On December 12, 2024, González signed a minor league contract with the Los Angeles Angels. He made 37 appearances for the Triple-A Salt Lake Bees and Single-A Inland Empire 66ers, compiling a 2–0 record and 3.89 ERA with 35 strikeouts and five saves across 41 2/3 innings pitched. González elected free agency following the season on November 6, 2025.

=== Diablos Rojos del México ===
On February 6, 2026, Gonzalez signed with the Diablos Rojos del México of the Mexican League.

== Personal life ==
González's has five uncles who played baseball in the Mexican League. He and his wife, Carolina Romero, are having their first child in 2024. She has a son from a previous marriage.
