= Mitch White (baseball) =

American baseball player (born 1994)

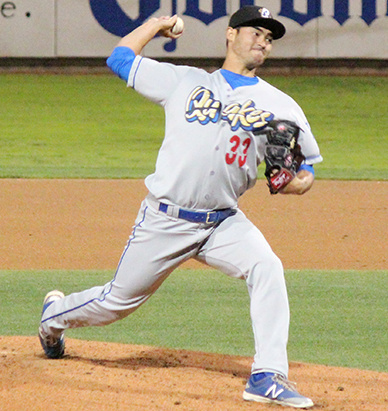
- White with the Rancho Cucamonga Quakes

Free agent
- Pitcher
- Born: December 28, 1994 (age 31); San Jose, California, U.S.
- Bats: Right Throws: Right

Professional debut
- MLB: August 28, 2020, for the Los Angeles Dodgers
- KBO: April 17, 2025, for the SSG Landers

MLB statistics (through 2024 season)
- Win–loss record: 4–12
- Earned run average: 5.25
- Strikeouts: 155

KBO statistics (through 2026 season)
- Win–loss record: 12–5
- Earned run average: 3.10
- Strikeouts: 166
- Stats at Baseball Reference

Teams
- Los Angeles Dodgers (2020–2022); Toronto Blue Jays (2022–2024); San Francisco Giants (2024); Milwaukee Brewers (2024); SSG Landers (2025–2026)

Mitchell Harrison White (born December 28, 1994) is an American professional baseball pitcher who is a free agent. He has previously played in Major League Baseball (MLB) for the Los Angeles Dodgers, Toronto Blue Jays, San Francisco Giants, and Milwaukee Brewers. He has also played in the KBO League for the SSG Landers.

== Amateur career ==
White attended Bellarmine College Preparatory in San Jose, California and played college baseball at Santa Clara University. He missed his freshman season in 2014 after undergoing Tommy John surgery. He returned in 2015 as a relief pitcher and in 2016 became a starter. After his sophomore season, he was selected by the Los Angeles Dodgers in the second round of the 2016 Major League Baseball draft.

== Professional career ==
=== Los Angeles Dodgers ===
White made his professional debut with the Arizona League Dodgers. After two starts, he was promoted to the Great Lakes Loons and ended the season with the Rancho Cucamonga Quakes. He did not allow an earned run in 22 innings over 11 games (six starts) for the three teams in 2016. In 2017, he made 19 starts across three levels, with nine for the Quakes, seven for the Tulsa Drillers and three rehab appearances for the Arizona Dodgers. He posted a combined 3–2 record with a 2.93 ERA and 88 strikeouts in 73.2 total innings pitched between the three teams. White spent 2018 with the Tulsa Drillers, going 6-7 with a 4.53 ERA in 22 starts.

White returned to Tulsa to begin 2019 but was promoted to the Triple-A Oklahoma City Dodgers after seven starts. Overall he made 13 starts (and three relief appearances) with a 4–6 record and 5.09 ERA. He was added to the 40-man roster after the season. He was called up to the Majors for the first time on August 1, 2020 but was optioned back to the minors the following day without appearing in a game.

White made his major league debut on August 28, 2020 against the Texas Rangers, pitching one scoreless inning and recording his first MLB strikeout against Shin-Soo Choo. On September 18, 2020, he pitched two scoreless innings out of relief and recorded his first career major league victory against the Colorado Rockies. He only pitched in two games during the 2020 season, working three innings, walking one, allowing one hit and striking out two.

White pitched in 21 games for the Dodgers during the 2021 season, with four starts. He allowed 19 earned runs in 46 2/3 innings for a 3.66 ERA and struck out 49 while walking 19. On August 18, he pitched 7 2/3 scoreless innings out of relief in the team's victory 9-0 victory over the Pittsburgh Pirates. He also pitched in 12 games in the minor leagues with a 3–0 record and 1.65 ERA. He was recalled and optioned 10 times each during the season. In the 2022 season, White appeared in 15 games for the Dodgers (making 10 starts) and had a 1–2 record and 3.70 ERA.

=== Toronto Blue Jays ===
On August 2, 2022, White and Alex De Jesus were traded to the Toronto Blue Jays in exchange for Nick Frasso and Moises Brito. In 10 games (8 starts), he struggled to an 0–5 record and 7.74 ERA with 31 strikeouts across 43 innings of work.

White began the 2023 season on the injured list with right elbow inflammation. After rehab stints with the Single-A Dunedin Blue Jays and Triple-A Buffalo Bisons, White experienced shoulder fatigue and was placed on the 60-day injured list on May 23. He was activated on June 9. On July 30, White was designated for assignment after the Blue Jays acquired Jordan Hicks from the St. Louis Cardinals. He cleared waivers and was sent outright to Triple–A Buffalo on August 4.

On November 6, 2023, the Blue Jays added White back to their 40–man roster to prevent him from electing minor league free agency. In four games for Toronto, he logged a 5.40 ERA with 6 strikeouts across 10 innings. White was designated for assignment on April 16, 2024.

=== San Francisco Giants ===
On April 20, 2024, White was traded to the San Francisco Giants in exchange for cash considerations. In three games for the Giants, he struggled to an 11.81 ERA with one strikeout across 5 1/3 innings. White was designated for assignment by San Francisco on May 5.

=== Milwaukee Brewers ===
On May 10, 2024, White was traded to the Milwaukee Brewers in exchange for cash considerations. With Milwaukee, his struggles continued as he compiled a 6.48 ERA with 6 strikeouts across 8 1/3 innings pitched. On May 30, White was designated for assignment by the Brewers. He cleared waivers and was sent outright to the Triple–A Nashville Sounds on June 3. In 18 games for Nashville, White logged a 6–4 record and 4.06 ERA with 68 strikeouts over 57 2/3 innings pitched. He elected free agency on October 1.

=== SSG Landers ===
On November 15, 2024, White signed a one–year, $1 million contract with the SSG Landers of the KBO League. He made 24 starts for the club in 2025, compiling an 11-4 record and 2.87 ERA with 137 strikeouts across 134 2/3 innings pitched.

On December 29, 2025, White re-signed with the Landers on a one-year $1.2 million contract. He made four starts for the team, logging a 1–1 record and 4.11 ERA with 29 strikeouts across 30 2/3 innings pitched. On June 6, 2026, White was waived by the Landers after suffering an injury.

== Personal life ==
White is half-Korean; his grandparents, mother Hailey and aunt Juju immigrated to the United States from South Korea in 1969. They settled in the Bay Area, but his grandfather became a dedicated Dodgers fan as the family established roots in the new country. White’s older brother Spencer was a lacrosse player for the UC San Diego Tritons. White is the nephew of ABC correspondent Juju Chang.
