= Jorbit Vivas =

Venezuelan baseball player (born 2001)

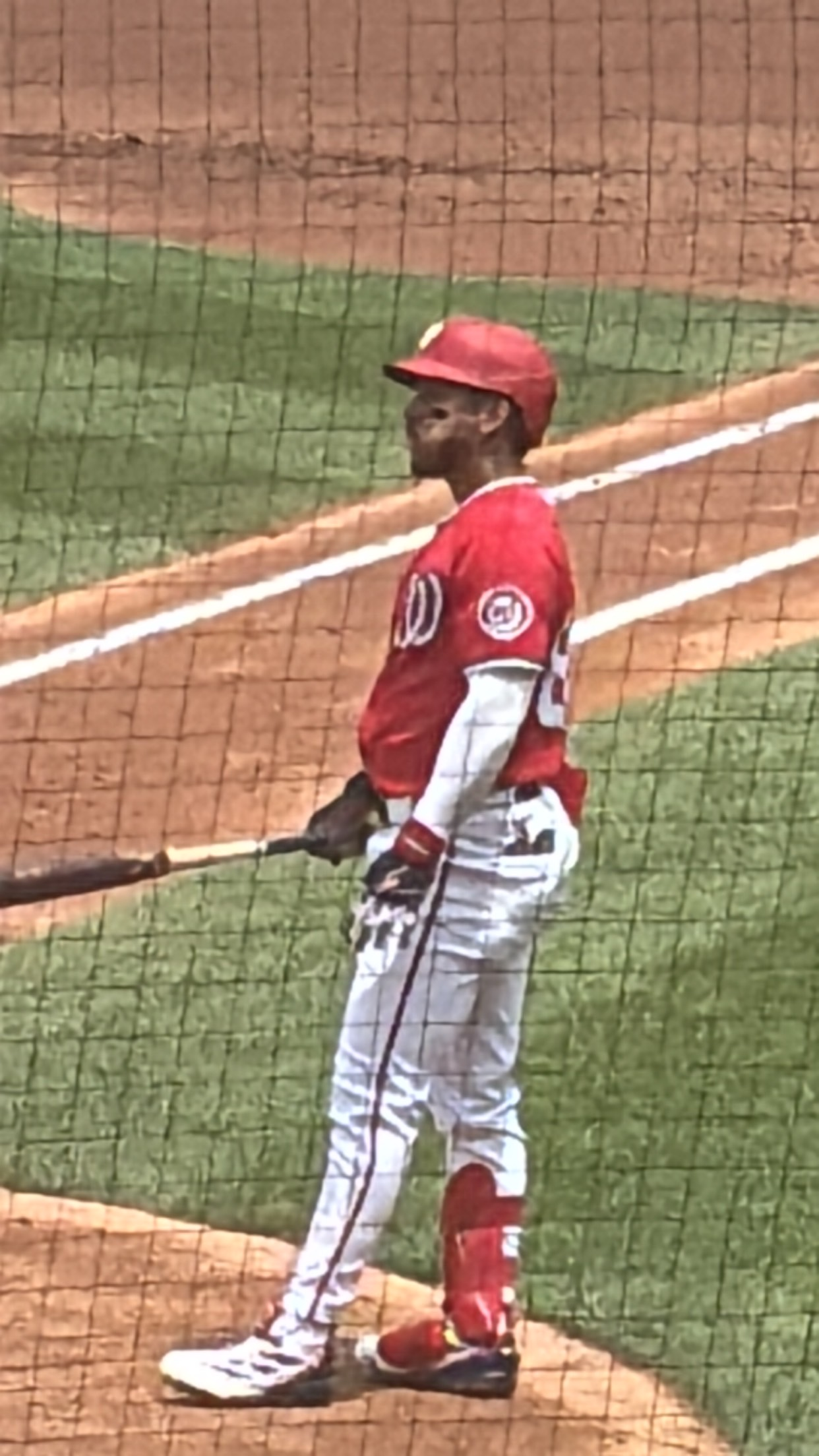
- Vivas with the Nationals in July 2026

Washington Nationals – No. 84
- Second baseman / Third baseman
- Born: March 9, 2001 (age 25); Puerto Cabello, Venezuela
- Bats: Left Throws: Right

MLB debut
- May 2, 2025, for the New York Yankees

MLB statistics (through 2026 season)
- Batting average: .226
- Home runs: 4
- Runs batted in: 36
- Stats at Baseball Reference

Teams
- New York Yankees (2025); Washington Nationals (2026–present)

Jorbit Jose Vivas (/jɔrˈbit ˈbibɑs/; born March 9, 2001) is a Venezuelan professional baseball infielder for the Washington Nationals of Major League Baseball (MLB). He has previously played in MLB for the New York Yankees. He made his MLB debut in 2025.

== Career ==
=== Los Angeles Dodgers ===
Vivas signed with the Los Angeles Dodgers as an international free agent on July 4, 2017. He began his career in 2018 with the Dodgers affiliate in the Dominican Summer League, hitting .222 in 51 games. In 2019, Vivas played for the Arizona League Dodgers and the Ogden Raptors, hitting a combined .327 in 54 games. He did not play in a game in 2020 due to the cancellation of the minor league season because of the COVID-19 pandemic. In 2021, Vivas played for the Rancho Cucamonga Quakes and Great Lakes Loons, hitting .312 in 106 games with 14 homers and 87 RBI.

On November 19, 2021, the Dodgers added Vivas to their 40-man roster to protect him from the Rule 5 draft. He spent 2022 with Great Lakes, where he hit .269 in 128 games. Vivas was optioned to the Double-A Tulsa Drillers to begin the 2023 season. He played in 109 games for Tulsa and 26 for the Triple-A Oklahoma City Dodgers, batting a combined .269 with 13 homers, 63 RBI and 25 stolen bases.

=== New York Yankees ===
On December 11, 2023, the Dodgers traded Vivas and Victor González to the New York Yankees in exchange for Trey Sweeney. He was optioned to the Triple-A Scranton/Wilkes-Barre RailRiders to begin the 2024 season. On July 12, Vivas was promoted to the major leagues for the first time. He went unused off of the bench and was optioned back to Scranton on July 15, temporarily becoming a phantom ballplayer.

Vivas was optioned to Triple-A Scranton to begin the 2025 season. On April 21, the Yankees recalled Vivas to their active roster after Trent Grisham was placed on the paternity list. He again did not appear in an MLB game and was optioned back to Triple-A after Grisham returned on April 24. On May 2, Vivas was recalled following an injury to Jazz Chisholm Jr. He made his MLB debut the same day against the Tampa Bay Rays. His first MLB hit, a single that scored two runs, was on May 5, also against the Rays. Vivas hit his first MLB home run on May 22, against the Texas Rangers. It was the only run scored in the game. Vivas made 29 appearances for the Yankees during his rookie campaign, batting .161/.266/.250 with one home run and five RBI.

=== Washington Nationals ===
On March 22, 2026, the Yankees traded Vivas to the Washington Nationals in exchange for Sean Paul Liñan. On May 18, Vivas made his debut pitching appearance as an emergency pitcher during the top of the 12th inning against the New York Mets.
