= Andre Jackson =

American baseball player (born 1996)

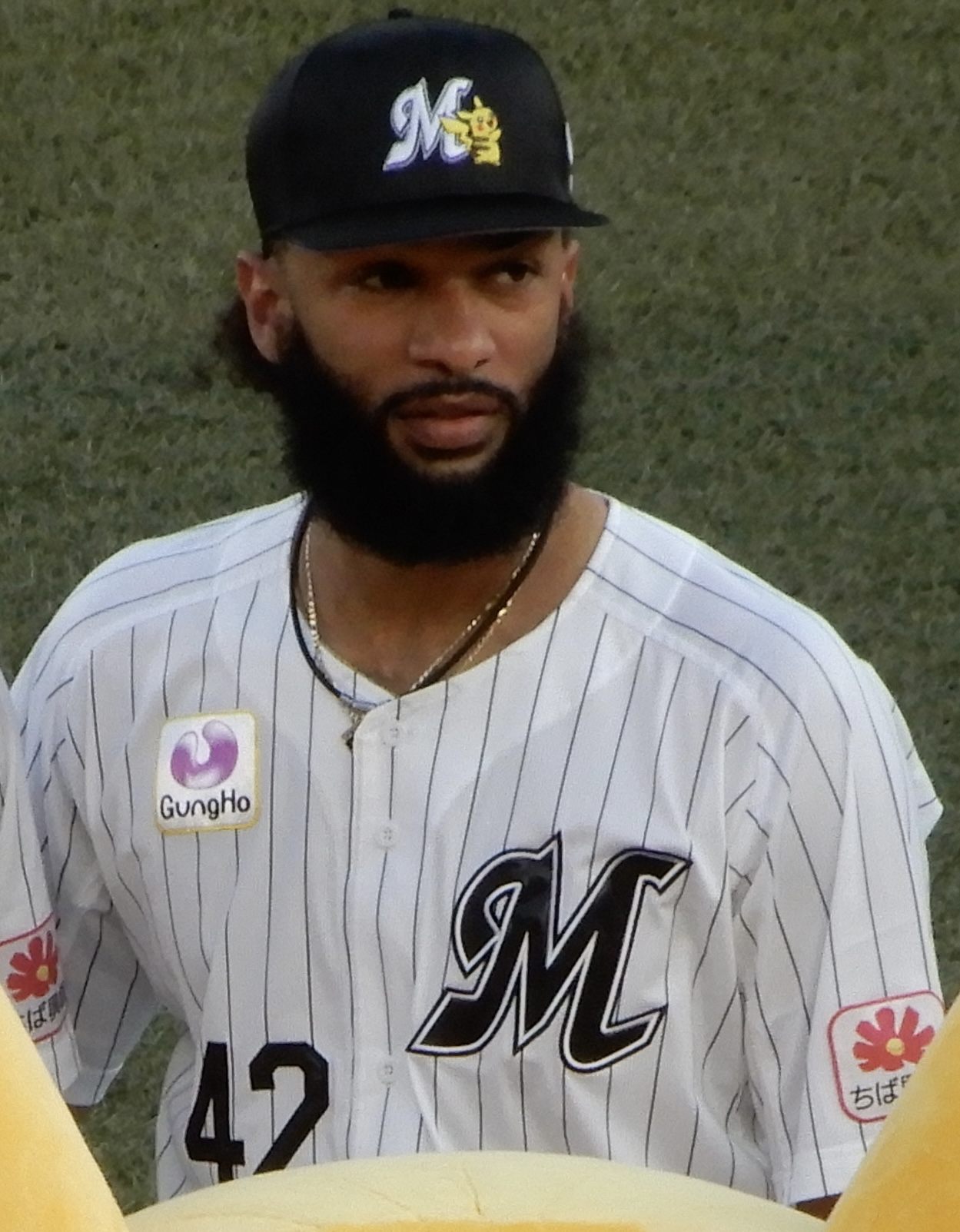
- Jackson with the Chiba Lotte Marines in 2026

Chiba Lotte Marines – No. 42
- Pitcher
- Born: May 1, 1996 (age 30); Vail, Arizona, U.S.
- Bats: Right Throws: Right

Professional debut
- MLB: August 16, 2021, for the Los Angeles Dodgers
- NPB: April 2, 2024, for the Yokohama DeNA BayStars

MLB statistics (through 2023 season)
- Win–loss record: 1–4
- Earned run average: 4.25
- Strikeouts: 76

NPB statistics (through August 21, 2026)
- Win–loss record: 26–21
- Earned run average: 2.76
- Strikeouts: 343
- Stats at Baseball Reference

Teams
- Los Angeles Dodgers (2021–2023); Pittsburgh Pirates (2023); Yokohama DeNA BayStars (2024–2025); Chiba Lotte Marines (2026–present)

Career highlights and awards
- Japan Series champion (2024); NPB All-Star (2025)

Andre Terrell Jackson (born May 1, 1996) is an American professional baseball pitcher for the Chiba Lotte Marines of Nippon Professional Baseball (NPB). He has previously played in Major League Baseball (MLB) for the Los Angeles Dodgers and Pittsburgh Pirates, and in NPB for the Yokohama DeNA BayStars.

== Amateur career ==
Jackson attended Cienega High School in Vail, Arizona. The Texas Rangers selected Jackson in the 32nd round of the 2014 Major League Baseball draft, but he did not sign and chose instead to attend the University of Utah and play college baseball for the Utah Utes. In 2015, Jackson's freshman year, he played as an outfielder, and hit .179 over 44 games. As a sophomore in 2016, he batted .299 with twenty RBIs over 34 games alongside pitching to a 6.41 ERA over 11 relief appearances. After the season, he underwent Tommy John surgery, and missed the 2017 season. Despite this, he was still selected by the Los Angeles Dodgers in the 12th round of the 2017 Major League Baseball draft as a pitcher.

== Professional career ==
=== Los Angeles Dodgers ===
Jackson signed with the Dodgers and made his professional debut in 2018, splitting time between the Rookie-league Arizona League Dodgers and the Great Lakes Loons of the Single-A Midwest League, going a combined 3–5 with a 4.10 ERA over 18 games (17 starts), striking out 76 batters over 68 innings. He returned to Great Lakes in 2019 before being promoted to the Rancho Cucamonga Quakes of the High-A California League. Over 25 starts between the two clubs, he went 7–2 with a 3.06 ERA. He did not play a game in 2020 due to the cancellation of the minor league season.

The Dodgers added Jackson to their 40-man roster after the 2020 season. To begin the 2021 season, he was assigned to the Tulsa Drillers of the Double-A Central. In June, Jackson was selected to play in the All-Star Futures Game at Coors Field. After pitching to a 3–2 record with a 3.27 ERA over 15 games (13 starts) and 63 1/3 innings with Tulsa, he was promoted to the Oklahoma City Dodgers of the Triple-A West in late July. Jackson was called up to the majors for the first time on August 16, 2021, and made his MLB debut that same night against the Pittsburgh Pirates. He pitched four scoreless innings in relief with five strikeouts, two hits, and four walks allowed. His first MLB strikeout was of Rodolfo Castro. He appeared in three total games for the Dodgers, pitching 11 2/3 innings while allowing three runs on ten hits for a 2.31 ERA.

In 2022, Jackson again spent most of the season in Triple–A, where he pitched in 21 games (19 starts) and had a 2–7 record and 5.00 ERA. He pitched in four games for the major league club, working 9 2/3 innings out of the bullpen and allowed two earned runs.

In 2023, Jackson made 11 appearances for Oklahoma City, with a 5.86 ERA in 27 3/3 innings and also made seven appearances out of the bullpen for the Dodgers, where he had a 6.62 ERA with 16 strikeouts and two saves in 17 2/3 innings pitched. On June 20, 2023, he was designated for assignment.

=== Pittsburgh Pirates ===
On June 25, 2023, Jackson was traded to the Pittsburgh Pirates in exchange for cash considerations. In 12 appearances for the Pirates, he posted a 4.33 ERA with 41 strikeouts across 43 2/3 innings pitched. On December 21, Jackson was designated for assignment and released the next day.

=== Yokohama DeNA BayStars ===
On January 11, 2024, Jackson signed with the Yokohama DeNA BayStars of Nippon Professional Baseball (NPB). After pitching to an 8–7 record with a 2.90 ERA and 121 strikeouts for the BayStars in the 2024 NPB season, Jackson started Game 1 of the 2024 Japan Series.

Jackson made 25 appearances for Yokohama during the 2025 season, compiling a 10-7 record and 2.33 ERA with 109 strikeouts across 150 2/3 innings pitched. On December 2, 2025, Jackson and the BayStars parted ways.

=== Chiba Lotte Marines ===
On December 17, 2025, Jackson signed with the Chiba Lotte Marines of Nippon Professional Baseball.

== Personal life ==
His brother, Isaiah, is also a professional baseball player.
