= Jake Reed (baseball) =

American baseball player (born 1992)

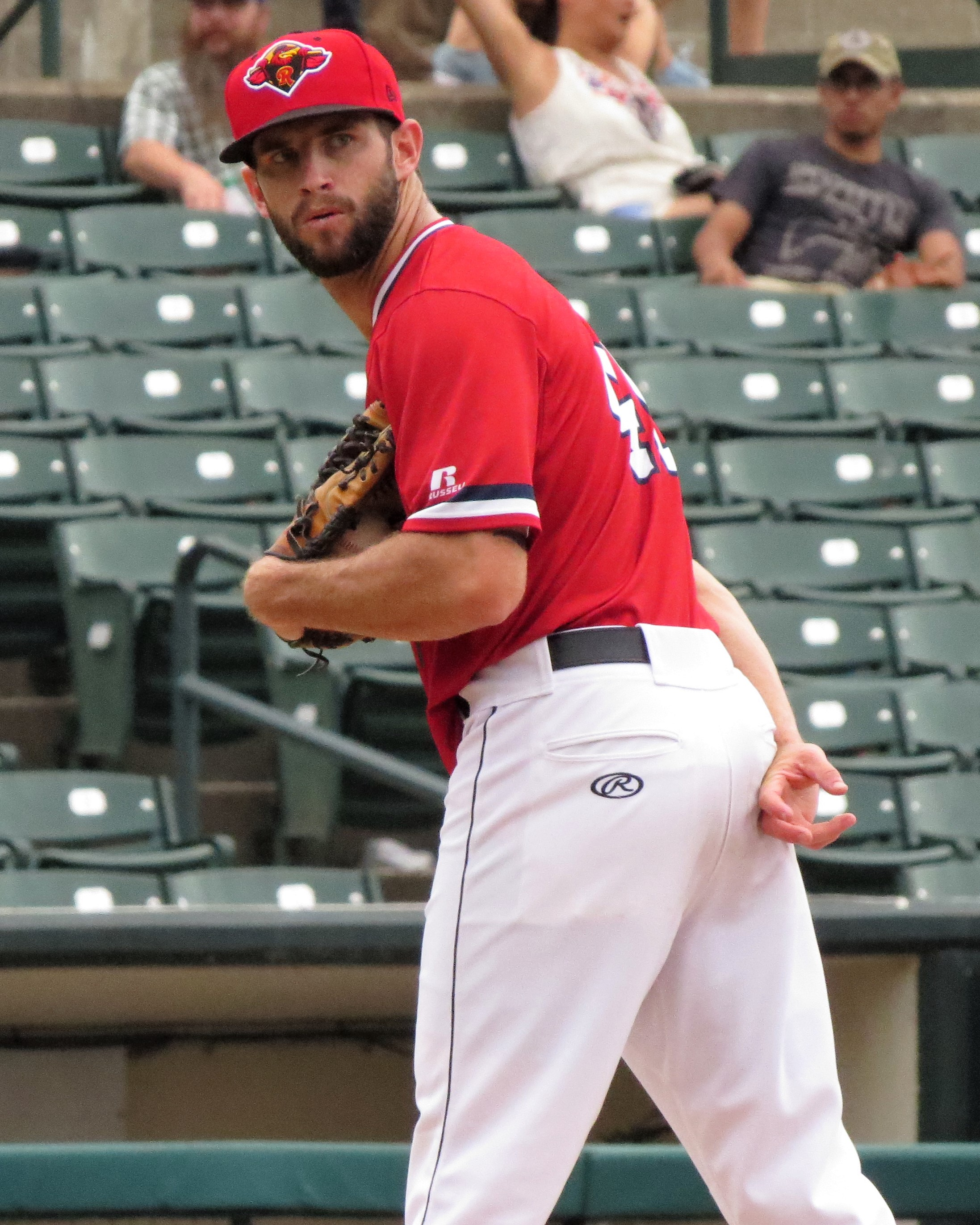
- Reed with the Rochester Red Wings in 2017
- Pitcher
- Born: September 29, 1992 (age 34); Tucson, Arizona, U.S.
- Batted: Right Threw: Right

MLB debut
- July 6, 2021, for the Los Angeles Dodgers

Last MLB appearance
- April 21, 2023, for the Los Angeles Dodgers

MLB statistics
- Win–loss record: 2–1
- Earned run average: 7.57
- Strikeouts: 24
- Stats at Baseball Reference

Teams
- Los Angeles Dodgers (2021); New York Mets (2021–2022); Los Angeles Dodgers (2022); Baltimore Orioles (2022); Los Angeles Dodgers (2023)

Jacob Hubert Reed (born September 29, 1992) is an American former professional baseball pitcher. He played in Major League Baseball (MLB) for the Los Angeles Dodgers, New York Mets, and Baltimore Orioles. He played college baseball for the Oregon Ducks.

== Career ==
=== Amateur career ===
Reed attended Helix High School in La Mesa, California, where he played for the school's baseball team as a pitcher and the American football team as a quarterback. For the baseball team as a sophomore, Reed had a 5–4 win–loss record with a 1.54 earned run average (ERA) and 70 strikeouts in 65 2/3 innings pitched, winning the Grossmont South League Pitcher of the Year. After graduating in 2011, the Chicago White Sox selected Reed in the 40th round, with the 1,221st overall selection, of the 2011 MLB draft. He did not sign with the White Sox, opting instead to attend college.

Reed enrolled at the University of Oregon to play college baseball for the Oregon Ducks baseball team. As a freshman, Reed set a Ducks' record for innings pitched by a freshman in a season. In his junior year at Oregon, the Ducks transitioned Reed into a relief pitcher. Serving as the Ducks' closer, Reed had a 4–1 win–loss record, a 1.93 ERA, and 13 saves. He was named to the All-Pac-12 Conference's first team.

=== Minnesota Twins ===
The Minnesota Twins selected Reed in the fifth round, with the 140th overall selection, in the 2014 Major League Baseball draft. He signed with the Twins, receiving a $350,000 signing bonus.

Reed began the 2014 season with the Elizabethton Twins of the Rookie-level Appalachian League, and was promoted to the Cedar Rapids Kernels of the Single–A Midwest League during the season. He finished the 2014 season with a 3–0 win–loss record, an 0.30 ERA, seven saves, and 39 strikeouts to three walks and 11 hits allowed in 30 innings pitched between the two levels. After the 2014 regular season, the Twins assigned Reed to the Arizona Fall League (AFL). In week one of the AFL season, he was named the Pitcher of the Week.

The Twins assigned Reed to the Chattanooga Lookouts of the Double–A Southern League to start the 2015 season, but he struggled, and was demoted to the Fort Myers Miracle of the High–A Florida State League. He returned to the Arizona Fall League after the season. The next year, Reed returned to Chattanooga and the Rochester Red Wings of the Triple–A International League. In 2017, Reed again pitched for Rochester and Chattanooga, recording a 2.13 ERA in 27 games. Reed spent the 2018 season in Rochester, recording a stellar 1.89 ERA in 30 appearances. He remained in Rochester for the 2019 season, pitching to a 5–3 record and 5.76 ERA in 45 games. Reed did not play in a game in 2020 due to the cancellation of the minor league season because of the COVID-19 pandemic. He became a free agent on November 2, 2020.

=== Los Angeles Angels ===
On November 17, 2020, Reed signed a minor league deal with the Los Angeles Angels organization. He was assigned to the Triple-A Salt Lake Bees to begin the 2021 season. After pitching to an 8.44 ERA in eight appearances, Reed opted out of his contract on May 31, 2021.

=== Los Angeles Dodgers ===
On June 4, 2021, Reed signed a minor league contract with the Los Angeles Dodgers and was assigned to Triple-A Oklahoma City Dodgers. In nine games with the team, he recorded a 2.61 ERA with 11 strikeouts. On July 6, the Dodgers added Reed to the 40-man roster and promoted him to the majors for the first time. He made his debut that night against the Miami Marlins, pitching 2/3 of an inning, allowing two hits, an intentional walk and one run while striking out Garrett Cooper for his first MLB strikeout. He pitched 5 1/3 innings across six games for the Dodgers while allowing three runs (two earned) on five hits. He was designated for assignment on July 21.

=== Tampa Bay Rays ===
On July 25, 2021, the Tampa Bay Rays claimed Reed off waivers from the Dodgers. He made one scoreless appearance for the Triple–A Durham Bulls before he was designated for assignment by the Rays on July 30.

=== New York Mets ===
On August 2, 2021, Reed was claimed off of waivers by the New York Mets. In 4 games for the team, he logged a 3.86 ERA with 5 strikeouts over 4 2/3 innings pitched.

Reed made 5 appearances for the Mets in 2022, struggling to an 11.37 ERA with 6 strikeouts across 6 1/3 innings of work. He was designated for assignment following the acquisition of Sam Clay on July 10, 2022.

=== Los Angeles Dodgers (second stint) ===
On July 13, 2022, Reed was claimed off waivers by the Dodgers. He picked up his first career save on August 30 against the Mets. He was designated for assignment on September 2. In five games for the Dodgers, he allowed one run in 4 2/3 innings.

=== Baltimore Orioles ===
Reed was claimed off waivers by the Baltimore Orioles on September 5, 2022. He had a 1–0 record with a 6.35 ERA while allowing four earned runs and seven hits in 5 2/3 innings over eight relief appearances with the Orioles. On October 12, Reed was designated for assignment by the Orioles.

=== Los Angeles Dodgers (third stint) ===
On October 13, 2022, Reed was claimed off waivers by the Boston Red Sox. On November 15, he was designated for assignment. Reed was again claimed off waivers by the Los Angeles Dodgers on November 18. The Dodgers designated him for assignment on December 29. He cleared waivers and was sent outright to the Triple-A Oklahoma City Dodgers on January 5, 2023.

On April 21, 2023, Reed was added back to the active roster. He pitched in relief for Los Angeles that day, facing seven batters and allowing six runs. Reed was designated for assignment the following day. He cleared waivers and was again sent outright to Oklahoma City on April 24. He pitched in 29 games for Oklahoma City, registering a 3–1 record and 7.34 ERA with 31 strikeouts in 34 1/3 innings of work. On October 10, Reed elected free agency.

== Personal life ==
Reed is married to Janie Takeda-Reed, a softball outfielder for the United States women's national softball team which won a silver medal at the 2020 Summer Olympics. Jake Reed, along with his wife Janie Reed, own and operate The Clubhouse Diamond Training Facility "San Diego's only 24/7 Batting Cage Facility" in El Cajon, CA.
