= Andy Burns =

American baseball player (born 1990)

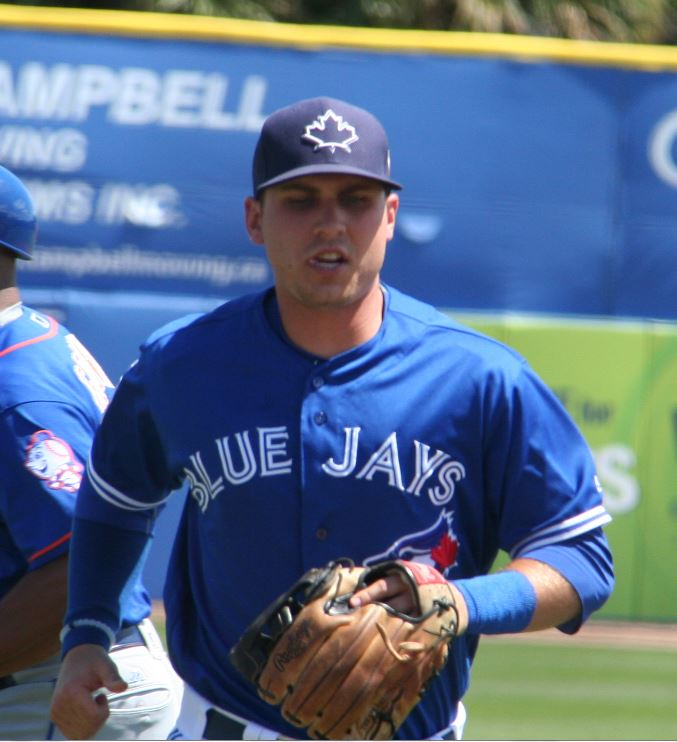
- Burns with the Blue Jays in 2016
- Infielder
- Born: August 7, 1990 (age 34); Greenville, South Carolina, U.S.
- Batted: Right Threw: Right

Professional debut
- MLB: May 9, 2016, for the Toronto Blue Jays
- KBO: March 31, 2017, for the Lotte Giants

Last appearance
- MLB: June 22, 2021, for the Los Angeles Dodgers
- KBO: October 14, 2018, for the Lotte Giants

MLB statistics
- Batting average: .111
- Home runs: 0
- Runs batted in: 0

KBO statistics
- Batting average: .285
- Home runs: 38
- Runs batted in: 121
- Stats at Baseball Reference

Teams
- Toronto Blue Jays (2016); Lotte Giants (2017–2018); Los Angeles Dodgers (2021)

Andrew David Burns (born August 7, 1990) is an American former professional baseball infielder. He has previously played in Major League Baseball (MLB) for the Los Angeles Dodgers and Toronto Blue Jays and in the KBO League for the Lotte Giants.

== High school and college ==
Burns graduated from Rocky Mountain High School in Fort Collins, Colorado, in 2008. The Colorado Rockies selected him in the 25th round of the 2008 Major League Baseball draft, but he opted to attend college. Burns enrolled at the University of Kentucky, and played college baseball for the Kentucky Wildcats baseball team. He was named the Southeastern Conference's freshman of the week for the week ending May 10, 2009. In 2010, he played collegiate summer baseball with the Brewster Whitecaps of the Cape Cod Baseball League. Burns transferred to the University of Arizona, where he intended to continue his collegiate career with the Arizona Wildcats baseball team. After sitting out a season due to the National Collegiate Athletic Association's rules on transferring between schools, the Toronto Blue Jays selected him in the 11th round of the 2011 Major League Baseball draft.

== Professional career ==
=== Toronto Blue Jays ===
==== Minor leagues ====
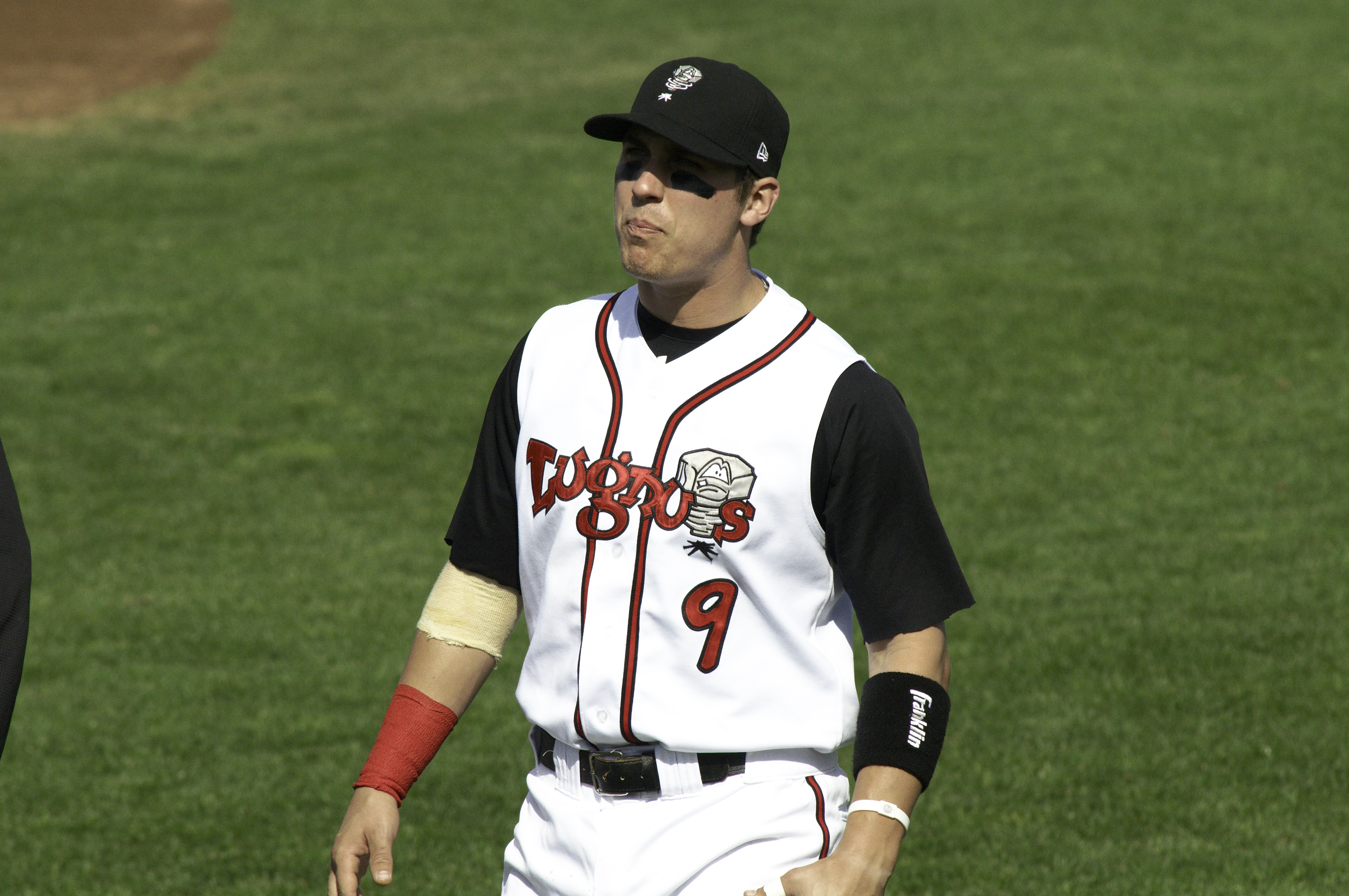
Burns with the Lansing Lugnuts in 2012

Burns signed with the Blue Jays and made his professional debut with the Gulf Coast League Blue Jays, before being promoted to the Vancouver Canadians of the Low–A Northwest League. In 2011, he played in 28 games and batted .250 with 3 home runs and 14 RBI. Burns played for the Lansing Lugnuts of the Single–A Midwest League in 2012, appearing in 78 games and hitting .248 with 9 home runs and 37 RBI. Burns began the 2013 minor league season with the Dunedin Blue Jays of the High–A Florida State League, and was promoted at midseason to the New Hampshire Fisher Cats of the Double–A Eastern League. He played in 128 games split between the two teams, and hit .288 with a career-high 15 home runs, 85 RBI, and 33 stolen bases. After the 2013 season, the Blue Jays assigned Burns to the Salt River Rafters of the Arizona Fall League, where he was named player of the week in the fourth week of the six-week schedule. He batted .312 with 13 RBI in 21 games for the Rafters.

The Blue Jays invited Burns to spring training as a non-roster invitee in 2014, but he did not make the team, returning to the New Hampshire Fisher Cats for the entire 2014 season. He would play in a career-high 133 games that season, batting .255 with 15 home runs, 63 RBI, and 18 stolen bases. In the offseason, he appeared in 12 games for the Bravos de Margarita of the Venezuelan Professional Baseball League, and hit .205 with 5 RBI. Burns began the 2015 season in New Hampshire, and earned a promoted to the Triple-A Buffalo Bisons on April 17. He would play in 132 total games in 2015, batting .291 with 5 home runs and 46 RBI.

Burns was invited to Major League spring training on January 12, 2016. He was optioned to Triple-A at the end of spring training. At the time of his call-up to the Blue Jays in May, he was hitting .250 with 9 doubles, 2 home runs, and 10 RBI for the Bisons.

==== Major Leagues ====
On May 6, 2016, Burns was called up by the Blue Jays. He made his Major League debut on May 9, striking out in a pinch-hitting appearance against the San Francisco Giants. Burns was optioned back to Buffalo on May 17, and recalled by the Blue Jays on June 15, only to be returned on June 18. Burns was recalled by the Blue Jays on July 8, and optioned back to Triple-A on July 22. He was recalled once more on September 27, but did not appear in any additional games for the Blue Jays. Burns appeared in ten games for the Blue Jays in 2016, scoring two runs and going hitless in six at-bats. On December 2, Burns was outrighted off of the 40-man roster and assigned to Triple-A Buffalo after clearing waivers. He was released by the Blue Jays organization on January 5, 2017.

=== Lotte Giants ===
On January 8, 2017, Burns signed a one-year, $650,000 contract with the Lotte Giants of the Korea Baseball Organization (KBO). For the 2017 season, Burns slashed .303/.361/.499 with 15 home runs and 57 RBI in 116 games. In 2018, Burns played in 133 games for Lotte, hitting .268/.329/.513 with 23 home runs and 64 RBI. He became a free agent after the 2018 season.

=== Toronto Blue Jays (second stint) ===
On February 4, 2019, Burns signed a minor league contract with the Toronto Blue Jays organization. He spent the 2019 season with the Triple–A Buffalo Bisons, posting a .275/.364/.470 slash line with 19 home runs and 63 RBI in 118 games. Burns did not play in a game in 2020 due to the cancellation of the minor league season because of the COVID-19 pandemic. On November 2, 2020, he elected free agency.

=== Los Angeles Dodgers ===
On December 16, 2020, Burns signed a minor league contract with the Los Angeles Dodgers organization. He was assigned to the Triple-A Oklahoma City Dodgers to begin the year. On June 12, 2021, Burns was called up to the major league roster. In his Dodgers debut, he recorded his first career MLB hit, an infield single off Texas Rangers starting pitcher Kolby Allard and also pitched an inning. He had three hits in 11 at-bats over nine games for the Dodgers and was designated for assignment on July 20. He was released by the team the same day. He was later re-signed by the club and finished the season in Triple–A, where he hit .237 in 54 games with six homers and 24 RBI. The Dodgers added him to the post-season roster prior to Game 5 of the NLCS to replace an injured Justin Turner. He had two at-bats as a pinch hitter in the series, grounding out in both appearances. The Dodgers outrighted him to the minors and removed him from the 40-man roster on November 5. Burns accepted the outright assignment and remained in the Dodgers organization.

In the 2022 season he spent the whole year at Oklahoma City, playing in 90 games with a .223 average. He elected free agency on November 10, 2022.
