= 2022 San Diego Padres season =

2022 San Diego Padres
- National League Wild Card winners
- League: National League
- Division: West
- Ballpark: Petco Park
- City: San Diego, California
- Record: 89–73 (.549)
- Divisional place: 2nd
- Owners: Peter Seidler
- General managers: A. J. Preller
- Managers: Bob Melvin
- Television: Bally Sports San Diego (Don Orsillo, Mark Grant, Mike Pomeranz, Mark Sweeney, Jesse Agler)
- Radio: KWFN 97.3 FM (Jesse Agler, Tony Gwynn Jr., Mark Grant); XEMO 860 AM (Spanish) (Eduardo Ortega, Carlos Hernandez, Pedro Gutierrez)

The 2022 San Diego Padres season was the 54th season of the San Diego Padres franchise. The Padres play their home games at Petco Park as members of Major League Baseball's (MLB) National League West.

On December 2, 2021, Commissioner of Baseball Rob Manfred announced a lockout of players, following expiration of the collective bargaining agreement (CBA) between the league and the Major League Baseball Players Association (MLBPA). On March 10, 2022, MLB and the MLBPA agreed to a new collective bargaining agreement, thus ending the lockout. Opening Day was played on April 7. Although MLB previously announced that several series would be cancelled due to the lockout, the agreement provides for a 162-game season, with originally canceled games to be made up via doubleheaders.

On October 2, San Diego clinched their first wild card berth since the pandemic shortened 2020 season and their first in a full season since the 2006 season. They defeated the New York Mets in the National League Wild Card Series and their division rival Los Angeles Dodgers in the National League Division Series. The Padres' 3–1 victory over the Dodgers was considered a historic upset, as their 111 wins in the regular season were the fourth most in MLB history and 22 more than San Diego's 89. The only time in league playoff history that a team defeated an opponent who was more than 22 wins better was in the 1906 World Series, when the 93-win Chicago White Sox defeated the 116-win Chicago Cubs. San Diego advanced to face the Philadelphia Phillies in the National League Championship Series, the Padres' first championship series since 1998. However, they were eliminated by the Phillies, losing in five games.

== Offseason ==
=== Lockout ===
The expiration of the league's collective bargaining agreement (CBA) with the Major League Baseball Players Association occurred on December 1, 2021, with no new agreement in place. As a result, the team owners voted unanimously to lockout the players stopping all free agency and trades.

The parties came to an agreement on a new CBA on March 10, 2022.

=== Rule changes ===
Pursuant to the new CBA, several new rules were instituted for the 2022 season. The National League adopted the designated hitter full-time, a draft lottery was implemented, the postseason will expand from ten teams to twelve, and advertising patches appeared on player uniforms and helmets for the first time.

=== Acquisitions ===
| Position | Player | 2021 Team | Ref |
|---|---|---|---|
| RP | Nick Martinez | Fukuoka SoftBank Hawks | |
| RP | Robert Suarez | Hanshin Tigers | |
| C | Jorge Alfaro | Miami Marlins | |
| DH | Luke Voit | New York Yankees | |
| SP | Sean Manaea | Oakland Athletics | |
| RP | Luis García | St. Louis Cardinals | |
| OF | Nomar Mazara | Detroit Tigers | |
| CP | Taylor Rogers | Minnesota Twins | |
| OF | Trayce Thompson | Chicago Cubs | |
| RP | Ray Kerr | Seattle Mariners | |
| OF/1B | Brent Rooker | Minnesota Twins | |
| OF/1B | Matt Beaty | Los Angeles Dodgers | |
| UTL | Brandon Dixon | Tohoku Rakuten Golden Eagles | |
| RP | Tayler Scott | Hiroshima Toyo Carp | |

=== Departures ===
| Position | Player | 2022 Team | Ref |
|---|---|---|---|
| CP | Mark Melancon | Arizona Diamondbacks | |
| OF | Tommy Pham | Cincinnati Reds | |
| IF | Adam Frazier | Seattle Mariners | |
| RP | Matt Strahm | Boston Red Sox | |
| SP | Chris Paddack | Minnesota Twins | |
| C | Victor Caratini | Milwaukee Brewers | |
| RP | Daniel Hudson | Los Angeles Dodgers | |
| SP | Jake Arrieta | Retired | |
| RP | Emilio Pagan | Minnesota Twins | |
| OF | Jake Marisnick | Texas Rangers | |
| RP | Miguel Díaz | Detroit Tigers | |
| RP | Keone Kela | Tokyo Yakult Swallows | |
| OF | Brian O'Grady | Saitama Seibu Lions | |
| RP | Nick Ramirez | Seattle Mariners | |
| OF | Patrick Kivlehan | Chicago White Sox | |
| SP | Vince Velasquez | Chicago White Sox | |
| OF | John Andreoli | Philadelphia Phillies | |
| RP | Ross Detwiler | Cincinnati Reds | |

== Regular season ==
=== National League West ===
NL West
| Team | W | L | Pct. | GB | Home | Road |
|---|---|---|---|---|---|---|
| Los Angeles Dodgers | 111 | 51 | .685 | — | 57‍–‍24 | 54‍–‍27 |
| San Diego Padres | 89 | 73 | .549 | 22 | 44‍–‍37 | 45‍–‍36 |
| San Francisco Giants | 81 | 81 | .500 | 30 | 44‍–‍37 | 37‍–‍44 |
| Arizona Diamondbacks | 74 | 88 | .457 | 37 | 40‍–‍41 | 34‍–‍47 |
| Colorado Rockies | 68 | 94 | .420 | 43 | 41‍–‍40 | 27‍–‍54 |

=== National League Wild Card ===
Division leaders
| Team | W | L | Pct. |
|---|---|---|---|
| Los Angeles Dodgers | 111 | 51 | .685 |
| Atlanta Braves | 101 | 61 | .623 |
| St. Louis Cardinals | 93 | 69 | .574 |

Wild Card teams (Top 3 teams qualify for postseason)
| Team | W | L | Pct. | GB |
|---|---|---|---|---|
| New York Mets | 101 | 61 | .623 | +14 |
| San Diego Padres | 89 | 73 | .549 | +2 |
| Philadelphia Phillies | 87 | 75 | .537 | — |
| Milwaukee Brewers | 86 | 76 | .531 | 1 |
| San Francisco Giants | 81 | 81 | .500 | 6 |
| Arizona Diamondbacks | 74 | 88 | .457 | 13 |
| Chicago Cubs | 74 | 88 | .457 | 13 |
| Miami Marlins | 69 | 93 | .426 | 18 |
| Colorado Rockies | 68 | 94 | .420 | 19 |
| Pittsburgh Pirates | 62 | 100 | .383 | 25 |
| Cincinnati Reds | 62 | 100 | .383 | 25 |
| Washington Nationals | 55 | 107 | .340 | 32 |

=== Record vs. opponents ===
2022 National League record Source: MLB Standings Grid – 2022
| Team | AZ | ATL | CHC | CIN | COL | LAD | MIA | MIL | NYM | PHI | PIT | SD | SF | STL | WSH | AL |
|---|---|---|---|---|---|---|---|---|---|---|---|---|---|---|---|---|
| Arizona | — | 2–4 | 4–3 | 3–4 | 9–10 | 5–14 | 5–1 | 4–3 | 2–4 | 3–3 | 4–3 | 5–14 | 10–9 | 2–5 | 4–3 | 12–8 |
| Atlanta | 4–2 | — | 3–3 | 4–3 | 6–1 | 2–4 | 13–6 | 3–3 | 10–9 | 11–8 | 7–0 | 3–4 | 4–3 | 4–3 | 14–5 | 13–7 |
| Chicago | 3–4 | 3–3 | — | 11–8 | 3–4 | 0–7 | 4–2 | 10–9 | 4–3 | 6–0 | 10–9 | 2–5 | 2–5 | 6–13 | 4–2 | 6–14 |
| Cincinnati | 4–3 | 3–4 | 8–11 | — | 2–4 | 0–7 | 4–3 | 6–13 | 1–5 | 1–6 | 7–12 | 0–6 | 4–2 | 7–12 | 3–4 | 12–8 |
| Colorado | 10–9 | 1–6 | 4–3 | 4–2 | — | 8–11 | 2–4 | 3–4 | 2–5 | 2–5 | 3–3 | 10–9 | 5–14 | 2–4 | 3–4 | 9–11 |
| Los Angeles | 14–5 | 4–2 | 7–0 | 7–0 | 11–8 | — | 6–1 | 4–3 | 3–4 | 3–4 | 1–5 | 14–5 | 15–4 | 4–2 | 3–3 | 15–5 |
| Miami | 1–5 | 6–13 | 2–4 | 3–4 | 4–2 | 1–6 | — | 4–3 | 6–13 | 7–12 | 4–3 | 3–4 | 3–4 | 2–4 | 15–4 | 8–12 |
| Milwaukee | 3–4 | 3–3 | 9–10 | 13–6 | 4–3 | 3–4 | 3–4 | — | 2–4 | 2–4 | 11–8 | 3–4 | 3–4 | 9–10 | 3–3 | 15–5 |
| New York | 4–2 | 9–10 | 3–4 | 5–1 | 5–2 | 4–3 | 13–6 | 4–2 | — | 14–5 | 6–1 | 2–4 | 4–3 | 5–2 | 14–5 | 9–11 |
| Philadelphia | 3–3 | 8–11 | 0–6 | 6–1 | 5–2 | 4–3 | 12–7 | 4–2 | 5–14 | — | 6–1 | 4–3 | 1–5 | 4–3 | 16–3 | 9–11 |
| Pittsburgh | 3–4 | 0–7 | 9–10 | 12–7 | 3–3 | 5–1 | 3–4 | 8–11 | 1–6 | 1–6 | — | 2–4 | 1–5 | 6–13 | 4–3 | 4–16 |
| San Diego | 14–5 | 4–3 | 5–2 | 6–0 | 9–10 | 5–14 | 4–3 | 4–3 | 4–2 | 3–4 | 4–2 | — | 13–6 | 2–4 | 4–3 | 8–12 |
| San Francisco | 9–10 | 3–4 | 5–2 | 2–4 | 14–5 | 4–15 | 4–3 | 4–3 | 3–4 | 5–1 | 5–1 | 6–13 | — | 3–4 | 4–2 | 10–10 |
| St. Louis | 5–2 | 3–4 | 13–6 | 12–7 | 4–2 | 2–4 | 4–2 | 10–9 | 2–5 | 3–4 | 13–6 | 4–2 | 4–3 | — | 4–3 | 10–10 |
| Washington | 3–4 | 5–14 | 2–4 | 4–3 | 4–3 | 3–3 | 4–15 | 3–3 | 5–14 | 3–16 | 3–4 | 3–4 | 2–4 | 3–4 | — | 8–12 |

Updated with the results of all games through October 5, 2022.

== Game log ==
=== Regular season ===
2022 game log: 89–73 (Home: 44–37; Away: 45–36)
April: 14–8 (Home: 6–4; Away: 8–4)

| # | Date | Opponent | Score | Win | Loss | Save | Attendance | Record | Streak |
|---|---|---|---|---|---|---|---|---|---|
| 1 | April 7 | @ Diamondbacks | 2–4 | Mantiply (1–0) | **Suárez** (0–1) | — | 35,508 | 0–1 | L1 |
| 2 | April 8 | @ Diamondbacks | 3–0 | **Manaea** (1–0) | Pérez (0–1) | **Rogers** (1) | 17,297 | 1–1 | W1 |
| 3 | April 9 | @ Diamondbacks | 5–2 | **Wilson** (1–0) | Kennedy (0–1) | **Rogers** (2) | 19,504 | 2–1 | W2 |
| 4 | April 10 | @ Diamondbacks | 10–5 | **Adams** (1–0) | Smith (0–1) | — | 19,089 | 3–1 | W3 |
| 5 | April 11 | @ Giants | 4–2 | **Wilson** (2–0) | Rogers (0–1) | **Rogers** (3) | 23,279 | 4–1 | W4 |
| 6 | April 12 | @ Giants | 2–13 | Cobb (1–0) | **Darvish** (0–1) | — | 25,560 | 4–2 | L1 |
| 7 | April 13 | @ Giants | 1–2 | Webb (1–0) | **Manaea** (1–1) | Doval (1) | 27,197 | 4–3 | L2 |
| 8 | April 14 | Braves | 12–1 | **Musgrove** (1–0) | Morton (1–1) | — | 44,844 | 5–3 | W1 |
| 9 | April 15 | Braves | 2–5 | O'Day (1–0) | **Johnson** (0–1) | Jansen (1) | 41,993 | 5–4 | L1 |
| 10 | April 16 | Braves | 2–5 | Anderson (1–1) | **Martinez** (0–1) | Jansen (2) | 36,924 | 5–5 | L2 |
| 11 | April 17 | Braves | 2–1 | **Darvish** (1–1) | Elder (1–1) | **Rogers** (4) | 37,694 | 6–5 | W1 |
| 12 | April 18 | Reds | 4–1 | **Manaea** (2–1) | Lodolo (0–2) | **Rogers** (5) | 31,121 | 7–5 | W2 |
| 13 | April 19 | Reds | 6–2 | **Musgrove** (2–0) | Sanmartin (0–2) | — | 31,313 | 8–5 | W3 |
| 14 | April 20 | Reds | 6–0 | **Gore** (1–0) | Gutiérrez (0–3) | — | 29,359 | 9–5 | W4 |
| 15 | April 22 | Dodgers | 1–6 | Urías (1–1) | **Martinez** (0–2) | — | 44,482 | 9–6 | L1 |
| 16 | April 23 | Dodgers | 3–2 (10) | **Suárez** (1–1) | Bruihl (0–1) | — | 44,444 | 10–6 | W1 |
| 17 | April 24 | Dodgers | 2–10 | Kershaw (3–0) | **Manaea** (2–2) | — | 44,930 | 10–7 | L1 |
| 18 | April 26 | @ Reds | 9–6 | **Musgrove** (3–0) | Sanmartin (0–3) | - | 10,056 | 11–7 | W1 |
| 19 | April 27 | @ Reds | 8–5 | **Gore** (2–0) | Gutiérrez (0–4) | **Rogers** (6) | 9,192 | 12–7 | W2 |
| 20 | April 28 | @ Reds | 7–5 | **Martinez** (1–2) | Mahle (1–3) | **Rogers** (7) | 10,449 | 13–7 | W3 |
| 21 | April 29 | @ Pirates | 7–3 | **Darvish** (2–1) | Thompson (0–3) | — | 9,755 | 14–7 | W4 |
| 22 | April 30 | @ Pirates | 6–7 (10) | Stratton (1–1) | **García** (0–1) | — | 20,483 | 14–8 | L1 |

May: 16–11 (Home: 7–6; Away: 9–5)

| # | Date | Opponent | Score | Win | Loss | Save | Attendance | Record | Streak |
|---|---|---|---|---|---|---|---|---|---|
| 23 | May 1 | @ Pirates | 5–2 | **Musgrove** (4–0) | Keller (0–4) | **Rogers** (9) | 8,350 | 15–8 | W1 |
| — | May 3 | @ Guardians | Postponed (rain); Makeup May 4 | | | | | | |
| 24 | May 4 (1) | @ Guardians | 5–4 | **Crismatt** (1–0) | Plesac (1–3) | **Rogers** (10) | see 2nd game | 16–8 | W2 |
| 25 | May 4 (2) | @ Guardians | 5–6 (10) | Sandlin (2–1) | **Lamet** (0–1) | — | 10,244 | 16–9 | L1 |
| 26 | May 5 | Marlins | 2–1 | **Martinez** (2–2) | Luzardo (2–2) | **Rogers** (11) | 31,034 | 17–9 | W1 |
| 27 | May 6 | Marlins | 3–2 | **Darvish** (3–1) | Alcántara (2–2) | **Wilson** (1) | 37,585 | 18–9 | W2 |
| 28 | May 7 | Marlins | 0–8 | López (4–1) | **Manaea** (2–3) | — | 34,709 | 18–10 | L1 |
| 29 | May 8 | Marlins | 3–2 | **Suárez** (2–1) | Sulser (0–1) | — | 37,937 | 19–10 | W1 |
| 30 | May 9 | Cubs | 0–6 | Hendricks (2–3) | **Gore** (2–1) | — | 41,595 | 19–11 | L1 |
| 31 | May 10 | Cubs | 5–4 | **Wilson** (3–0) | Gsellman (0–1) | **Rogers** (12) | 31,047 | 20–11 | W1 |
| 32 | May 11 | Cubs | 5–7 | Givens (2–0) | **García** (0–2) | Wick (2) | 29,344 | 20–12 | L1 |
| 33 | May 13 | @ Braves | 11–6 | **García** (1–2) | Smith (0–1) | **Rogers** (13) | 40,635 | 21–12 | W1 |
| 34 | May 14 | @ Braves | 5–6 | Jansen (2–0) | **Wilson** (3–1) | — | 40,490 | 21–13 | L1 |
| 35 | May 15 | @ Braves | 7–3 (11) | **Crismatt** (2–0) | Stephens (0–1) | — | 40,114 | 22–13 | W1 |
| 36 | May 17 | @ Phillies | 3–0 | **Clevinger** (1–0) | Eflin (1–3) | **Rogers** (14) | 29,200 | 23–13 | W2 |
| 37 | May 18 | @ Phillies | 0–3 | Wheeler (2–3) | **Snell** (0–1) | Knebel (8) | 27,655 | 23–14 | L1 |
| 38 | May 19 | @ Phillies | 2–0 | **Darvish** (4–1) | Gibson (3–2) | **Rogers** (15) | 30,146 | 24–14 | W1 |
| 39 | May 20 | @ Giants | 8–7 (10) | **García** (2–2) | Doval (0–2) | **Suárez** (1) | 31,359 | 25–14 | W2 |
| 40 | May 21 | @ Giants | 2–1 | **Musgrove** (5–0) | Rodón (4–3) | **Rogers** (16) | 38,916 | 26–14 | W3 |
| 41 | May 22 | @ Giants | 10–1 | **Gore** (3–1) | Wood (3–3) | — | 35,363 | 27–14 | W4 |
| 42 | May 23 | Brewers | 3–2 (10) | **García** (3–2) | Sánchez (0–1) | — | 31,504 | 28–14 | W5 |
| 43 | May 24 | Brewers | 1–4 | Burnes (2–2) | **Snell** (0–2) | Williams (3) | 39,834 | 28–15 | L1 |
| 44 | May 25 | Brewers | 1–2 | Perdomo (1–0) | **Darvish** (4–2) | Williams (4) | 27,831 | 28–16 | L2 |
| 45 | May 27 | Pirates | 4–3 | **Crismatt** (3–0) | Underwood Jr. (0–1) | **Rogers** (17) | 41,888 | 29–16 | W1 |
| 46 | May 28 | Pirates | 2–4 | Banda (1–0) | **Rogers** (0–1) | Bednar (9) | 38,189 | 29–17 | L1 |
| 47 | May 29 | Pirates | 4–2 (10) | **García** (4–2) | Stratton (2–2) | — | 44,395 | 30–17 | W1 |
| 48 | May 30 | @ Cardinals | 3–6 | Pallante (1–0) | **Martinez** (2–3) | — | 42,140 | 30–18 | L1 |
| 49 | May 31 | @ Cardinals | 2–3 (10) | VerHagen (3–0) | **Rogers** (0–2) | — | 33,418 | 30–19 | L2 |

June: 16–13 (Home: 8–6; Away: 8–7)

| # | Date | Opponent | Score | Win | Loss | Save | Attendance | Record | Streak |
|---|---|---|---|---|---|---|---|---|---|
| 50 | June 1 | @ Cardinals | 2–5 | Hudson (4–2) | **Darvish** (4–3) | Wittgren (1) | 34,268 | 30–20 | L3 |
| 51 | June 2 | @ Brewers | 4–5 | Strzelecki (1–0) | **Rogers** (0–3) | — | 21,451 | 30–21 | L4 |
| 52 | June 3 | @ Brewers | 7–0 | **Musgrove** (6–0) | Burnes (3–3) | — | 30,019 | 31–21 | W1 |
| 53 | June 4 | @ Brewers | 4–0 | **Gore** (4–1) | Ashby (1–4) | — | 37,376 | 32–21 | W2 |
| 54 | June 5 | @ Brewers | 6–4 (10) | **Hill** (1–0) | Gott (1–1) | **Rogers** (18) | 32,285 | 33–21 | W3 |
| 55 | June 6 | Mets | 5–11 | Carrasco (7–1) | **Snell** (0–3) | — | 34,858 | 33–22 | L1 |
| 56 | June 7 | Mets | 7–0 | **Darvish** (5–3) | Walker (3–2) | — | 31,796 | 34–22 | W1 |
| 57 | June 8 | Mets | 13–2 | **Manaea** (3–3) | Bassitt (4–4) | — | 40,992 | 35–22 | W2 |
| 58 | June 10 | Rockies | 9–0 | **Musgrove** (7–0) | Kuhl (4–3) | — | 35,207 | 36–22 | W3 |
| 59 | June 11 (1) | Rockies | 2–1 (10) | **Wilson** (4–1) | Estévez (1–4) | — | 31,415 | 37–22 | W4 |
| 60 | June 11 (2) | Rockies | 2–6 | Freeland (2–5) | **Gore** (4–2) | — | 30,040 | 37–23 | L1 |
| 61 | June 12 | Rockies | 2–4 | Márquez (3–5) | **García** (4–3) | Bard (13) | 41,754 | 37–24 | L2 |
| 62 | June 13 | @ Cubs | 4–1 | **Darvish** (6–3) | Wick (1–2) | **Rogers** (19) | 31,629 | 38–24 | W1 |
| 63 | June 14 | @ Cubs | 12–5 | **Tyler** (1–0) | Effross (1–2) | — | 29,233 | 39–24 | W2 |
| 64 | June 15 | @ Cubs | 19–5 | **Stammen** (1–0) | Kilian (0–1) | — | 31,570 | 40–24 | W3 |
| 65 | June 16 | @ Cubs | 6–4 | **Musgrove** (8–0) | Swarmer (1–2) | **Rogers** (20) | 30,096 | 41–24 | W4 |
| 66 | June 17 | @ Rockies | 4–10 | Freeland (3–5) | **Gore** (4–3) | — | 34,304 | 41–25 | L1 |
| 67 | June 18 | @ Rockies | 4–5 | Colomé (2–0) | **García** (4–4) | Bard (14) | 38,768 | 41–26 | L2 |
| 68 | June 19 | @ Rockies | 3–8 | Senzatela (3–3) | **Snell** (0–4) | — | 47,342 | 41–27 | L3 |
| 69 | June 20 | Diamondbacks | 4–1 | **Darvish** (7–3) | Davies (2–4) | **Rogers** (21) | 35,430 | 42–27 | W1 |
| 70 | June 21 | Diamondbacks | 3–2 (11) | **Hill** (2–0) | Kennedy (3–4) | — | 31,528 | 43–27 | W2 |
| 71 | June 22 | Diamondbacks | 10–4 | **Morejón** (1–0) | Bumgarner (3–7) | **Martinez** (1) | 31,024 | 44–27 | W3 |
| 72 | June 23 | Phillies | 2–6 | Suárez (6–4) | **Musgrove** (8–1) | — | 40,355 | 44–27 | L1 |
| 73 | June 24 | Phillies | 1–0 | **Crismatt** (4–0) | Nola (4–5) | **Rogers** (22) | 38,890 | 45–28 | W1 |
| 74 | June 25 | Phillies | 2–4 | Eflin (3–5) | **Snell** (0–5) | Domínguez (2) | 37,467 | 45–29 | L1 |
| 75 | June 26 | Phillies | 5–8 | Nelson (2–1) | **Crismatt** (4–1) | Bellatti (1) | 41,620 | 45–30 | L2 |
| 76 | June 28 | @ Diamondbacks | 6–7 | Melancon (3–6) | **Rogers** (0–4) | — | 19,904 | 45–31 | L3 |
| 77 | June 29 | @ Diamondbacks | 4–0 | **Clevinger** (2–0) | Bumgarner (3–8) | **Martinez** (2) | 20,109 | 46–31 | W1 |
| 78 | June 30 | @ Dodgers | 1–3 | Phillips (2–3) | **Musgrove** (8–2) | Kimbrel (14) | 53,094 | 46–32 | L1 |

July: 11–14 (Home: 6–6; Away: 5–8)

| # | Date | Opponent | Score | Win | Loss | Save | Attendance | Record | Streak |
|---|---|---|---|---|---|---|---|---|---|
| 79 | July 1 | @ Dodgers | 1–5 | Gonsolin (10–0) | **Stammen** (1–1) | — | 48,076 | 46–33 | L2 |
| 80 | July 2 | @ Dodgers | 2–7 | Anderson (9–1) | **Darvish** (7–4) | — | 47,061 | 46–34 | L3 |
| 81 | July 3 | @ Dodgers | 4–2 | **Martinez** (3–3) | Kimbrel (1–4) | **Rogers** (23) | 42,633 | 47–34 | W1 |
| 82 | July 4 | Mariners | 2–8 | Flexen (5–8) | **Manaea** (3–4) | — | 37,913 | 47–35 | L1 |
| 83 | July 5 | Mariners | 2–6 | Gilbert (10–3) | **Clevinger** (2–1) | — | 29,745 | 47–36 | L2 |
| 84 | July 7 | Giants | 2–1 (10) | **Crismatt** (5–1) | García (1–3) | — | 42,656 | 48–36 | W1 |
| 85 | July 8 | Giants | 6–3 | **Snell** (1–5) | Long (0–2) | **Martinez** (3) | 42,861 | 49–36 | W2 |
| 86 | July 9 | Giants | 1–3 | Rodón (8–5) | **García** (4–5) | — | 41,714 | 49–37 | L1 |
| 87 | July 10 | Giants | 0–12 | Wood (6–7) | **Gore** (4–4) | — | 38,712 | 49–38 | L2 |
| 88 | July 11 | @ Rockies | 6–5 | **Manaea** (4–4) | Ureña (0–1) | **Rogers** (24) | 27,592 | 50–38 | W1 |
| 89 | July 12 | @ Rockies | 3–5 | Gomber (5–7) | **Clevinger** (2–2) | Bard (19) | 26,577 | 50–39 | L1 |
| 90 | July 13 | @ Rockies | 6–10 | Stephenson (1–1) | **Scott** (0–1) | — | 25,725 | 50–40 | L2 |
| 91 | July 14 | @ Rockies | 5–8 | Chacín (4–2) | **Crismatt** (5–2) | Estévez (1) | 28,077 | 50–41 | L3 |
| 92 | July 15 | Diamondbacks | 5–3 | **Darvish** (8–4) | Bumgarner (5–9) | **Rogers** (25) | 41,302 | 51–41 | W1 |
| 93 | July 16 | Diamondbacks | 4–3 | **Manaea** (5–4) | Ramirez (2–3) | **Rogers** (26) | 42,384 | 52–41 | W2 |
| 94 | July 17 | Diamondbacks | 1–3 | Kelly (9–5) | **Clevinger** (2–3) | Melancon (13) | 36,428 | 52–42 | L1 |
**92nd All-Star Game in Los Angeles, CA**
| 95 | July 22 | @ Mets | 4–1 | **Darvish** (9–4) | Scherzer (6–2) | **Rogers** (27) | 36,855 | 53–42 | W1 |
| 96 | July 23 | @ Mets | 2–1 | **Snell** (2–5) | Bassitt (7–7) | **Rogers** (28) | 39,359 | 54–42 | W2 |
| 97 | July 24 | @ Mets | 5–8 | Smith (2–3) | **Musgrove** (8–3) | Díaz (21) | 35,475 | 54–43 | L1 |
| 98 | July 25 | @ Tigers | 4–12 | Vest (2–2) | **Manaea** (5–5) | — | 21,647 | 54–44 | L2 |
| 99 | July 26 | @ Tigers | 6–4 (10) | **Rogers** (1–4) | Soto (2–5) | **Martinez** (4) | 24,213 | 55–44 | W1 |
| 100 | July 27 | @ Tigers | 3–4 | Fulmer (3–4) | **Rogers** (1–5) | — | 24,669 | 55–45 | L1 |
| 101 | July 29 | Twins | 10–1 | **Snell** (3–5) | Ryan (7–4) | — | 43,171 | 56–45 | W1 |
| 102 | July 30 | Twins | 4–7 | Gray (6–3) | **Musgrove** (8–4) | — | 39,574 | 56–46 | L1 |
| 103 | July 31 | Twins | 3–2 | **Manaea** (6–5) | Bundy (6–5) | **García** (1) | 37,336 | 57–46 | W1 |

August: 16–13 (Home: 8–6; Away: 8–7)

| # | Date | Opponent | Score | Win | Loss | Save | Attendance | Record | Streak |
|---|---|---|---|---|---|---|---|---|---|
| 104 | August 1 | Rockies | 4–1 | **Clevinger** (3–3) | Senzatela (3–6) | **García** (2) | 29,983 | 58–46 | W2 |
| 105 | August 2 (1) | Rockies | 13–5 | **Darvish** (10–4) | Bird (1–3) | — | 23,828 | 59–46 | W3 |
| 106 | August 2 (2) | Rockies | 3–2 | **Hader** (2–4) | Colomé (2–4) | — | 30,759 | 60–46 | W4 |
| 107 | August 3 | Rockies | 9–1 | **Snell** (4–5) | Kuhl (6–7) | — | 44,652 | 61–46 | W5 |
| 108 | August 4 | Rockies | 3–7 | Freeland (7–7) | **Musgrove** (8–5) | — | 30,366 | 61–47 | L1 |
| 109 | August 5 | @ Dodgers | 1–8 | Gonsolin (13–1) | **Manaea** (6–6) | — | 52,714 | 61–48 | L2 |
| 110 | August 6 | @ Dodgers | 3–8 | Martin (3–0) | **Clevinger** (3–4) | — | 52,124 | 61–49 | L3 |
| 111 | August 7 | @ Dodgers | 0–4 | Anderson (13–1) | **Darvish** (10–5) | — | 48,093 | 61–50 | L4 |
| 112 | August 8 | Giants | 0–1 | Wood (8–9) | **Snell** (4–6) | Doval (15) | 40,686 | 61–51 | L5 |
| 113 | August 9 | Giants | 7–4 | **Hill** (3–0) | Rogers (2–4) | — | 38,626 | 62–51 | W1 |
| 114 | August 10 | Giants | 13–7 | **Suárez** (3–1) | Marte (0–1) | — | 32,834 | 63–51 | W2 |
| 115 | August 12 | @ Nationals | 10–5 | **Clevinger** (4–4) | Abbott (0–2) | — | 35,390 | 64–51 | W3 |
| 116 | August 13 | @ Nationals | 3–4 | Finnegan (4–2) | **Darvish** (10–6) | Edwards Jr. (2) | 33,661 | 64–52 | L1 |
| 117 | August 14 | @ Nationals | 6–0 | **Snell** (5–6) | Espino (0–5) | — | 27,498 | 65–52 | W1 |
| 118 | August 15 | @ Marlins | 0–3 | Alcántara (11–5) | **Musgrove** (8–6) | Scott (17) | 9,123 | 65–53 | L1 |
| 119 | August 16 | @ Marlins | 3–4 | Hernández (3–6) | **García** (4–6) | Floro (3) | 9,065 | 65–54 | L2 |
| 120 | August 17 | @ Marlins | 10–3 | **Morejón** (2–0) | López (7–8) | — | 7,273 | 66–54 | W1 |
| 121 | August 18 | Nationals | 1–3 | Edwards Jr. (5–3) | **Darvish** (10–7) | Finnegan (6) | 41,820 | 66–55 | L1 |
| 122 | August 19 | Nationals | 3–6 | Ramírez (4–1) | **Hader** (2–5) | Finnegan (7) | 39,474 | 66–56 | L2 |
| 123 | August 20 | Nationals | 2–1 | **Morejón** (3–0) | Cishek (1–4) | **García** (3) | 42,529 | 67–56 | W1 |
| 124 | August 21 | Nationals | 2–1 | **Manaea** (7–6) | Corbin (4–17) | **Martinez** (5) | 38,253 | 68–56 | W1 |
| 125 | August 23 | Guardians | 1–3 | Sandlin (5–2) | **Clevinger** (4–5) | Clase (29) | 38,166 | 68–57 | L1 |
| 126 | August 24 | Guardians | 0–7 | Quantrill (10–5) | **Snell** (5–7) | — | 30,409 | 68–58 | L2 |
| 127 | August 26 | @ Royals | 13–5 | **Suárez** (4–1) | Bubic (2–9) | — | 16,479 | 69–58 | W1 |
| 128 | August 27 | @ Royals | 4–3 | **Darvish** (11–7) | Lynch (4–9) | **Martinez** (6) | 22,232 | 70–58 | W2 |
| 129 | August 28 | @ Royals | 7–15 | Heasley (2–7) | **Manaea** (7–7) | — | 12,584 | 70–59 | L1 |
| 130 | August 29 | @ Giants | 6–5 | **Clevinger** (5–5) | Rodón (12–7) | **Martinez** (7) | 24,815 | 71–59 | W1 |
| 131 | August 30 | @ Giants | 4–3 | **Snell** (6–7) | Webb (11–8) | **Martinez** (8) | 28,267 | 72–59 | W2 |
| 132 | August 31 | @ Giants | 5–4 | **Musgrove** (9–6) | Wood (8–12) | **Hader** (30) | 25,298 | 73–59 | W3 |

September: 13–12 (Home: 6–7; Away: 7–5)

| # | Date | Opponent | Score | Win | Loss | Save | Attendance | Record | Streak |
|---|---|---|---|---|---|---|---|---|---|
| 133 | September 2 | @ Dodgers | 7–1 | **Darvish** (12–7) | May (1–2) | — | 45,164 | 74–59 | W4 |
| 134 | September 3 | @ Dodgers | 1–12 | Urías (15–7) | **Manaea** (7–8) | — | 46,144 | 74–60 | L1 |
| 135 | September 4 | @ Dodgers | 4–9 | Vesia (4–0) | **Clevinger** (5–6) | — | 48,522 | 74–61 | L2 |
| 136 | September 5 | Diamondbacks | 0–5 | Nelson (1–0) | **Snell** (6–8) | — | 37,713 | 74–62 | L3 |
| 137 | September 6 | Diamondbacks | 6–5 | **Martinez** (4–3) | Kennedy (4–7) | — | 31,308 | 75–62 | W1 |
| 138 | September 7 | Diamondbacks | 6–3 | **Darvish** (13–7) | Henry (3–4) | **Hader** (31) | 36,948 | 76–62 | W2 |
| 139 | September 9 | Dodgers | 5–4 (10) | **Morejón** (4–0) | Hembree (3–1) | — | 43,286 | 77–62 | W3 |
| 140 | September 10 | Dodgers | 4–8 | Urías (16–7) | **Snell** (6–9) | — | 43,639 | 77–63 | L1 |
| 141 | September 11 | Dodgers | 2–11 | Heaney (3–2) | **Musgrove** (9–7) | — | 41,652 | 77–64 | L2 |
| 142 | September 13 | @ Mariners | 2–0 | **Darvish** (14–7) | Gilbert (12–6) | **Hader** (32) | 34,740 | 78–64 | W1 |
| 143 | September 14 | @ Mariners | 1–6 | Castillo (7–5) | **Clevinger** (5–7) | — | 24,238 | 78–65 | L1 |
| 144 | September 15 | @ Diamondbacks | 0–4 | Jameson (1–0) | **Manaea** (7–9) | — | 17,121 | 78–66 | L2 |
| 145 | September 16 | @ Diamondbacks | 12–3 | **Snell** (7–9) | Bumgarner (6–15) | — | 19,945 | 79–66 | W1 |
| 146 | September 17 | @ Diamondbacks | 2–0 | **Musgrove** (10–7) | Gallen (12–3) | **Hader** (33) | 29,796 | 80–66 | W2 |
| 147 | September 18 | @ Diamondbacks | 6–1 | **Darvish** (15–7) | Nelson (1–1) | — | 20,480 | 81–66 | W3 |
| 148 | September 20 | Cardinals | 5–0 | **Clevinger** (6–7) | Wainwright (11–10) | — | 39,538 | 82–66 | W4 |
| 149 | September 21 | Cardinals | 1–0 | **Snell** (8–9) | Mikolas (11–13) | **Hader** (34) | 38,643 | 83–66 | W5 |
| 150 | September 22 | Cardinals | 4–5 | Flaherty (1–1) | **Martinez** (4–4) | Gallegos (14) | 33,389 | 83–67 | L1 |
| 151 | September 23 | @ Rockies | 3–4 (10) | Bard (6–4) | **Morejón** (4–1) | — | 48,321 | 83–68 | L2 |
| 152 | September 24 | @ Rockies | 9–3 | **Darvish** (16–7) | Kuhl (6–10) | — | 45,983 | 84–68 | W1 |
| 153 | September 25 | @ Rockies | 13–6 | **Suárez** (5–1) | Freeland (9–11) | — | 40,503 | 85–68 | W2 |
| 154 | September 27 | Dodgers | 4–3 (10) | **Johnson** (1–1) | Kimbrel (6–7) | — | 32,127 | 86–68 | W3 |
| 155 | September 28 | Dodgers | 0–1 (10) | Vesia (5–0) | **Wilson** (4–2) | Kahnle (1) | 32,523 | 86–69 | L1 |
| 156 | September 29 | Dodgers | 2–5 | Heaney (4–3) | **Johnson** (1–2) | Price (2) | 35,636 | 86–70 | L2 |
| 157 | September 30 | White Sox | 1–3 | Martin (3–5) | **Darvish** (16–8) | Hendriks (35) | 37,490 | 86–71 | L3 |

October: 3–2 (Home: 3–2; Away: 0–0)

| # | Date | Opponent | Score | Win | Loss | Save | Attendance | Record | Streak |
|---|---|---|---|---|---|---|---|---|---|
| 158 | October 1 | White Sox | 5–2 | **Clevinger** (7–7) | Cease (14–8) | **Hader** (35) | 38,114 | 87–71 | W1 |
| 159 | October 2 | White Sox | 1–2 | Lynn (8–7) | **Snell** (8–10) | Hendriks (36) | 41,407 | 87–72 | L1 |
| 160 | October 3 | Giants | 7–4 | **Morejón** (5–1) | Miller (0–1) | **Hader** (36) | 31,687 | 88–72 | W1 |
| 161 | October 4 | Giants | 6–2 | **Manaea** (8–9) | Cobb (7–8) | — | 32,884 | 89–72 | W2 |
| 162 | October 5 | Giants | 1–8 | Marte (1–1) | **Stammen** (1–2) | — | 32,064 | 89–73 | L1 |

Legend: = Win = Loss = Postponement
Bold = Padres team member

== Trade Deadline ==
August 1: Taylor Rogers, Dinelson Lamet, Esteury Ruiz, & Robert Gasser to the Milwaukee Brewers in exchange for closer Josh Hader.

August 2: MacKenzie Gore, CJ Abrams, Luke Voit, Robert Hassell, James Wood, & Jarlin Susana to the Washington Nationals in exchange for outfielder Juan Soto & first baseman Josh Bell.

August 2: Eric Hosmer, Max Ferguson, & Corey Rosier to the Boston Red Sox in exchange for minor-league pitcher Jay Groome.

August 2: Brent Rooker to the Kansas City Royals in exchange for catcher Cam Gallagher.

August 2: Victor Acosta to the Cincinnati Reds in exchange for utility player Brandon Drury.

== Postseason ==
=== Game log ===
2022 Postseason game log: 6–6 (Home: 3–1; Away: 3–5)
NL Wild Card Series: 2–1 (Home: 0–0; Away: 2–1)

| # | Date | Opponent | Score | Win | Loss | Save | Attendance | Series |
|---|---|---|---|---|---|---|---|---|
| 1 | October 7 | @ Mets | 7–1 | Darvish (1–0) | Scherzer (0–1) | — | 41,621 | 1–0 |
| 2 | October 8 | @ Mets | 3–7 | deGrom (1–0) | Martinez (0–1) | Lugo (1) | 42,156 | 1–1 |
| 3 | October 9 | @ Mets | 6–0 | Musgrove (1–0) | Bassitt (0–1) | — | 39,241 | 2–1 |

NL Division Series: 3–1 (Home: 2–0; Away: 1–1)

| # | Date | Opponent | Score | Win | Loss | Save | Attendance | Series |
|---|---|---|---|---|---|---|---|---|
| 1 | October 11 | @ Dodgers | 3–5 | Urías (1–0) | Clevinger (0–1) | Martin (1) | 52,407 | 0–1 |
| 2 | October 12 | @ Dodgers | 5–3 | Darvish (1–0) | Graterol (0–1) | Hader (1) | 53,122 | 1–1 |
| 3 | October 14 | Dodgers | 2–1 | Snell (1–0) | Gonsolin (0–1) | Hader (2) | 45,137 | 2–1 |
| 4 | October 15 | Dodgers | 5–3 | Hill (1–0) | Almonte (0–1) | Hader (3) | 45,139 | 3–1 |

NL Championship Series: 1–4 (Home: 1–1; Away: 0–3)

| # | Date | Opponent | Score | Win | Loss | Save | Attendance | Series |
|---|---|---|---|---|---|---|---|---|
| 1 | October 18 | Phillies | 0–2 | Wheeler (1–1) | Darvish (2–1) | Alvarado (1) | 44,826 | 0–1 |
| 2 | October 19 | Phillies | 8–5 | Snell (2–0) | Nola (2–1) | Hader (4) | 44,607 | 1–1 |
| 3 | October 21 | @ Phillies | 2–4 | Suárez (1–0) | Musgrove (1–1) | Domínguez (1) | 45,279 | 1–2 |
| 4 | October 22 | @ Phillies | 6–10 | Hand (2–0) | Manaea (0–1) | — | 45,467 | 1–3 |
| 5 | October 23 | @ Phillies | 3–4 | Alvarado (1–0) | Suárez (0–1) | Suárez (1) | 45,485 | 1–4 |

=== Postseason rosters ===
Playoff rosters
National League Wild Card Series

- Pitchers: 4 Blake Snell 11 Yu Darvish 21 Nick Martinez 25 Tim Hill 36 Pierce Johnson 44 Joe Musgrove 48 Steven Wilson 50 Adrián Morejón 55 Sean Manaea 66 Luis García 71 Josh Hader 75 Robert Suárez
- Catchers: 12 Luis Campusano 26 Austin Nola 38 Jorge Alfaro
- Infielders: 5 Wil Myers 7 Ha-seong Kim 9 Jake Cronenworth 13 Manny Machado 16 Brandon Dixon 17 Brandon Drury
- Outfielders: 2 Trent Grisham 10 Jurickson Profar 22 Juan Soto 28 José Azócar
- Designated hitters: 24 Josh Bell

National League Division Series

- Pitchers: 4 Blake Snell 11 Yu Darvish 21 Nick Martinez 25 Tim Hill 36 Pierce Johnson 44 Joe Musgrove 48 Steven Wilson 50 Adrián Morejón 52 Mike Clevinger 55 Sean Manaea 66 Luis García 71 Josh Hader 75 Robert Suárez
- Catchers: 12 Luis Campusano 26 Austin Nola 38 Jorge Alfaro
- Infielders: 5 Wil Myers 7 Ha-seong Kim 9 Jake Cronenworth 13 Manny Machado 17 Brandon Drury
- Outfielders: 2 Trent Grisham 10 Jurickson Profar 22 Juan Soto 28 José Azócar
- Designated hitters: 24 Josh Bell

National League Championship Series

- Pitchers: 4 Blake Snell 11 Yu Darvish 21 Nick Martinez 25 Tim Hill 36 Pierce Johnson 44 Joe Musgrove 48 Steven Wilson 50 Adrián Morejón 52 Mike Clevinger 55 Sean Manaea 66 Luis García 71 Josh Hader 75 Robert Suárez
- Catchers: 12 Luis Campusano 26 Austin Nola 38 Jorge Alfaro
- Infielders: 5 Wil Myers 7 Ha-seong Kim 9 Jake Cronenworth 13 Manny Machado 17 Brandon Drury
- Outfielders: 2 Trent Grisham 10 Jurickson Profar 22 Juan Soto 28 José Azócar
- Designated hitters: 24 Josh Bell

== Roster ==
2022 San Diego Padres
Roster
| Pitchers: 54 Austin Adams; 60 Pedro Ávila; 49 Michel Báez; 65 José Castillo; 52 Mike Clevinger; 74 Nabil Crismatt; 11 Yu Darvish; 66 Luis García; 1 MacKenzie Gore; 8 Javy Guerra; 71 Josh Hader; 25 Tim Hill; 36 Pierce Johnson; 56 Ray Kerr; 33 Reiss Knehr; 29 Dinelson Lamet; 55 Sean Manaea; 21,22 Nick Martinez; 50 Adrián Morejón; 44 Joe Musgrove; 17 Taylor Rogers; 62 Tayler Scott; 4 Blake Snell; 34 Craig Stammen; 75 Robert Suárez; 63 Kyle Tyler; 40 Ryan Weathers; 48 Steven Wilson | Catchers: 38 Jorge Alfaro; 12,21 Luis Campusano; 26 Austin Nola; Infielders: 77 CJ Abrams; 41 Sergio Alcántara; 37 Matthew Batten; 24 Josh Bell; 24 Robinson Canó; 9 Jake Cronenworth; 16 Brandon Dixon; 17 Brandon Drury; 30 Eric Hosmer; 7 Ha-seong Kim; 13,21 Manny Machado; 32 Eguy Rosario; 45 Luke Voit | Outfielders: 28 José Azócar; 27 Matt Beaty; 2 Trent Grisham; 1 Luis Liberato; 16 Nomar Mazara; 5 Wil Myers; 10 Jurickson Profar; 12 Brent Rooker; 43 Esteury Ruiz; 22 Juan Soto; 43 Trayce Thompson | Manager: 3 Bob Melvin; Coaches: 86 Heberto Andrade (coaching assistant); 39 Michael Brdar (hitting); 81 Morgan Burkhart (batting practice/hitting instructor); 99 Francisco Cervelli (catching); 20 Ryan Christenson (bench); 84 Ryan Flaherty (quality control); 53 Ben Fritz (bullpen); 46 David Macias (first base/outfield instructor); 57 Ruben Niebla (pitching); 82 Justin Novak (coaching assistant); 00 Bryan Price (senior advisor); 83 Peter Summerville (game planning/coaching assistant); 18 Matt Williams (third base) |

== Player stats ==
=== Batting ===
Note: G = Games played; AB = At bats; R = Runs; H = Hits; 2B = Doubles; 3B = Triples; HR = Home runs; RBI = Runs batted in; SB = Stolen bases; BB = Walks; AVG = Batting average; SLG = Slugging average

| Player | G | AB | R | H | 2B | 3B | HR | RBI | SB | BB | AVG | SLG |
|---|---|---|---|---|---|---|---|---|---|---|---|---|
| Jake Cronenworth | 158 | 587 | 88 | 140 | 30 | 4 | 17 | 88 | 3 | 70 | .239 | .390 |
| Manny Machado | 150 | 578 | 100 | 172 | 37 | 1 | 32 | 102 | 9 | 63 | .298 | .531 |
| Jurickson Profar | 152 | 575 | 82 | 140 | 36 | 2 | 15 | 58 | 5 | 73 | .243 | .391 |
| Ha-seong Kim | 150 | 517 | 58 | 130 | 29 | 3 | 11 | 59 | 12 | 51 | .251 | .383 |
| Trent Grisham | 152 | 451 | 58 | 83 | 16 | 2 | 17 | 53 | 7 | 57 | .184 | .341 |
| Austin Nola | 110 | 347 | 40 | 87 | 15 | 0 | 4 | 40 | 2 | 34 | .251 | .329 |
| Eric Hosmer | 90 | 335 | 32 | 91 | 16 | 0 | 8 | 40 | 0 | 33 | .272 | .391 |
| Luke Voit | 82 | 298 | 38 | 67 | 18 | 0 | 13 | 48 | 1 | 39 | .225 | .416 |
| Wil Myers | 77 | 261 | 29 | 68 | 15 | 0 | 7 | 41 | 2 | 21 | .261 | .398 |
| Jorge Alfaro | 82 | 256 | 25 | 63 | 14 | 0 | 7 | 40 | 1 | 11 | .246 | .383 |
| José Azócar | 98 | 202 | 24 | 52 | 9 | 3 | 0 | 10 | 5 | 12 | .257 | .332 |
| Juan Soto | 52 | 182 | 31 | 43 | 8 | 1 | 6 | 16 | 0 | 44 | .236 | .390 |
| Josh Bell | 53 | 177 | 26 | 34 | 5 | 0 | 3 | 14 | 0 | 32 | .192 | .271 |
| Brandon Drury | 46 | 168 | 25 | 40 | 9 | 0 | 8 | 28 | 0 | 9 | .238 | .435 |
| Nomar Mazara | 55 | 159 | 16 | 42 | 8 | 0 | 2 | 18 | 0 | 10 | .264 | .352 |
| CJ Abrams | 46 | 125 | 16 | 29 | 5 | 0 | 2 | 11 | 1 | 4 | .232 | .320 |
| Luis Campusano | 16 | 48 | 4 | 12 | 1 | 0 | 1 | 5 | 0 | 1 | .250 | .333 |
| Matt Beaty | 20 | 43 | 6 | 4 | 1 | 1 | 0 | 1 | 0 | 2 | .093 | .163 |
| Sergio Alcántara | 22 | 35 | 3 | 4 | 0 | 0 | 0 | 3 | 0 | 2 | .114 | .114 |
| Robinson Canó | 12 | 33 | 1 | 3 | 0 | 0 | 0 | 1 | 0 | 1 | .091 | .091 |
| Esteury Ruiz | 14 | 27 | 1 | 6 | 1 | 1 | 0 | 2 | 1 | 0 | .222 | .333 |
| Matthew Batten | 15 | 19 | 0 | 2 | 1 | 0 | 0 | 1 | 0 | 2 | .105 | .158 |
| Trayce Thompson | 6 | 14 | 1 | 1 | 0 | 0 | 0 | 2 | 0 | 2 | .071 | .071 |
| Brandon Dixon | 5 | 14 | 1 | 3 | 1 | 0 | 0 | 1 | 0 | 0 | .214 | .286 |
| Brent Rooker | 2 | 7 | 0 | 0 | 0 | 0 | 0 | 0 | 0 | 0 | .000 | .000 |
| Eguy Rosario | 7 | 5 | 0 | 1 | 0 | 0 | 0 | 0 | 0 | 1 | .200 | .200 |
| Luis Liberato | 7 | 5 | 0 | 0 | 0 | 0 | 0 | 0 | 0 | 0 | .000 | .000 |
| Team totals | 162 | 5468 | 705 | 1317 | 275 | 18 | 153 | 682 | 49 | 574 | .241 | .382 |

=== Pitching ===
Note: W = Wins; L = Losses; ERA = Earned run average; G = Games pitched; GS = Games started; SV = Saves; IP = Innings pitched; H = Hits allowed; R = Runs allowed; ER = Earned runs allowed; BB = Walks allowed; SO = Strikeouts

| Player | W | L | ERA | G | GS | SV | IP | H | R | ER | BB | SO |
|---|---|---|---|---|---|---|---|---|---|---|---|---|
| Yu Darvish | 16 | 8 | 3.10 | 30 | 30 | 0 | 194.2 | 148 | 67 | 67 | 37 | 197 |
| Joe Musgrove | 10 | 7 | 2.93 | 30 | 30 | 0 | 181.0 | 154 | 67 | 59 | 42 | 184 |
| Sean Manaea | 8 | 9 | 4.96 | 30 | 28 | 0 | 158.0 | 155 | 95 | 87 | 50 | 156 |
| Blake Snell | 8 | 10 | 3.38 | 24 | 24 | 0 | 128.0 | 103 | 51 | 48 | 51 | 171 |
| Mike Clevinger | 7 | 7 | 4.33 | 23 | 22 | 0 | 114.1 | 102 | 56 | 55 | 35 | 91 |
| Nick Martinez | 4 | 4 | 3.47 | 47 | 10 | 8 | 106.1 | 96 | 44 | 41 | 41 | 95 |
| MacKenzie Gore | 4 | 4 | 4.50 | 16 | 13 | 0 | 70.0 | 66 | 35 | 35 | 37 | 72 |
| Nabil Crismatt | 5 | 2 | 2.94 | 50 | 1 | 0 | 67.1 | 57 | 29 | 22 | 22 | 65 |
| Luis García | 4 | 6 | 3.39 | 64 | 0 | 3 | 61.0 | 57 | 28 | 23 | 17 | 68 |
| Steven Wilson | 4 | 2 | 3.06 | 50 | 1 | 1 | 53.0 | 36 | 20 | 18 | 20 | 53 |
| Tim Hill | 3 | 0 | 3.56 | 55 | 0 | 0 | 48.0 | 45 | 20 | 19 | 14 | 25 |
| Robert Suárez | 5 | 1 | 2.27 | 45 | 0 | 1 | 47.2 | 29 | 13 | 12 | 21 | 61 |
| Taylor Rogers | 1 | 5 | 4.35 | 42 | 0 | 28 | 41.1 | 37 | 22 | 20 | 9 | 48 |
| Craig Stammen | 1 | 2 | 4.43 | 33 | 1 | 0 | 40.2 | 45 | 22 | 20 | 10 | 35 |
| Adrián Morejón | 5 | 1 | 4.24 | 26 | 0 | 0 | 34.0 | 31 | 18 | 16 | 9 | 28 |
| Josh Hader | 1 | 1 | 7.31 | 19 | 0 | 7 | 16.0 | 17 | 14 | 13 | 9 | 22 |
| Pierce Johnson | 1 | 2 | 5.02 | 15 | 0 | 0 | 14.1 | 14 | 8 | 8 | 8 | 21 |
| Reiss Knehr | 0 | 0 | 3.95 | 5 | 1 | 0 | 13.2 | 11 | 6 | 6 | 4 | 10 |
| Dinelson Lamet | 0 | 1 | 9.49 | 13 | 0 | 0 | 12.1 | 16 | 14 | 13 | 9 | 16 |
| Tayler Scott | 0 | 1 | 6.75 | 8 | 0 | 0 | 12.0 | 19 | 10 | 9 | 6 | 13 |
| Ray Kerr | 0 | 0 | 9.00 | 7 | 0 | 0 | 5.0 | 3 | 5 | 5 | 4 | 3 |
| Pedro Ávila | 0 | 0 | 4.50 | 2 | 0 | 0 | 4.0 | 3 | 3 | 2 | 1 | 5 |
| Kyle Tyler | 1 | 0 | 0.00 | 2 | 0 | 0 | 4.0 | 2 | 0 | 0 | 1 | 2 |
| Wil Myers | 0 | 0 | 7.36 | 4 | 0 | 0 | 3.2 | 4 | 3 | 3 | 0 | 0 |
| Ryan Weathers | 0 | 0 | 9.82 | 1 | 1 | 0 | 3.2 | 6 | 4 | 4 | 4 | 3 |
| Austin Adams | 1 | 0 | 0.00 | 2 | 0 | 0 | 2.1 | 0 | 0 | 0 | 3 | 2 |
| Michel Báez | 0 | 0 | 0.00 | 2 | 0 | 0 | 2.0 | 1 | 0 | 0 | 0 | 2 |
| Matthew Batten | 0 | 0 | 4.50 | 2 | 0 | 0 | 2.0 | 2 | 1 | 1 | 0 | 1 |
| Javy Guerra | 0 | 0 | 18.00 | 1 | 0 | 0 | 2.0 | 3 | 4 | 4 | 3 | 1 |
| José Castillo | 0 | 0 | 9.00 | 1 | 0 | 0 | 1.0 | 1 | 1 | 1 | 1 | 1 |
| Team totals | 89 | 73 | 3.81 | 162 | 162 | 48 | 1443.1 | 1263 | 660 | 611 | 468 | 1451 |

== Farm system ==
| Level | Team | League | Manager | W | L | Position |
|---|---|---|---|---|---|---|
| Triple-A | El Paso Chihuahuas | Pacific Coast League | Jared Sandberg | 85 | 65 | Won Eastern Division Title 1st |
| Double-A | San Antonio Missions | Texas League | Phillip Wellman | 38 | 29 | Won First-Half Southern Division title 1st |
| High-A | Fort Wayne TinCaps | Midwest League | Brian Esposito | 27 | 39 | 5th |
| Low-A | Lake Elsinore Storm | California League | Eric Junge | 40 | 26 | 1st |
| Rookie | ACL Padres | Arizona Complex League | Lukas Ray | 29 | 25 | 2nd |
| Rookie | DSL Padres | Dominican Summer League | Luis Mendez | 36 | 23 | 2nd |
