= Rosario (surname) =

Rosario is a Spanish and Portuguese surname. The variation Rozario is popular among Roman Catholics and Luso-Asians in Asia, especially in Bangladesh, India, Malaysia, and Singapore. Notable people with the surname include:

- Alejandro Rosario (born 2002), American baseball player
- Amed Rosario (born 1995), Dominican baseball player
- Daniel Rosario (born 2002), Puerto Rican footballer
- Dante Rosario (born 1984), American football player in the National Football League
- Eddie Rosario (born 1991), Puerto Rican baseball player
- Edwin Rosario (1963–1997), Puerto Rican boxer
- Eguy Rosario (born 1999), Dominican baseball player
- Francisco Rosario (born 1980), Dominican retired baseball pitcher
- Gerardo Rosario (born 1952), Filipino swimmer
- Hélder Rosário (born 1980), Portuguese footballer
- Jerry Rosario (born 1952), Indian clergyman and theologian
- Jimmy Rosario (born 1945), Puerto Rican baseball player
- JoAnn Rosario, American gospel singer
- Joe Rosario (born 1959), American actor
- Joel Rosario (born 1985), Dominican horse jockey
- José Rosario (born 1967), Puerto Rican politician
- Joseph Albert Rosario (1915–2011), Indian clergyman
- Kala'i Rosario (born 2002), American baseball player
- Márcio Rosário (born 1983), Brazilian footballer
- Mark Rosario, alias used by the suspect in the Killing of Brian Thompson
- Mel Rosario (born 1973), Dominican retired baseball catcher
- Nelly Rosario (born 1972), Dominican-American novelist
- Nelson Rosario (born 1989), American football player in the National Football League
- Pablo Rosario (born 1997), Dutch footballer of Dominican descent
- Paul Brian Rosario (born 1982), Filipino sport shooter
- Rainel Rosario, professional baseball player
- Ralphi Rosario, American house musician
- Ramón Rosario (1927–2014), Puerto Rican shot putter
- Robert Rosario (born 1966), English footballer
- Rodrigo Rosario (born 1978), Dominican retired baseball pitcher
- Sandy Rosario (born 1985), Dominican baseball pitcher
- Santiago Rosario (1939–2013), Puerto Rican baseball player
- Shirley Rosario, American poker player
- Toño Rosario (born 1955), Dominican merengue musician, previous member of Los Hermanos Rosario
- Troy Rosario (born 1992), Filipino basketball player
- Vernon Rosario (born 1962), American psychiatrist and medical historian
- Víctor Rosario (born 1966), Dominican retired baseball player
- Virgilio Rosario (1499–1559), Italian clergyman
- Wilin Rosario (born 1989), Dominican baseball catcher
- Willie Rosario (born 1930), Puerto Rican salsa musician
- Jonathan Rosario (born 1990), Filipino habitual line stepper

== See also ==
- Del Rosario (surname), also includes the Portuguese equivalent do Rosário
- Rosario (disambiguation)
- Ángel Rosario Cabada (1872–1921), Mexican agrarian leader
- Cleverson Rosário dos Santos (born 1983), Brazilian footballer
- Dwayne De Rosario (born 1978), Canadian soccer (football) player
