= Del Rosario =

del Rosario
- Current region: Latin America, Latin Europe, Philippines
- Etymology: of the rosary
- Origin: Spain, Portugal, Italy
- Distinctions: do Rosário (in Portuguese),
- Traditions: Our Lady of the Rosary's Feast of the Holy Rosary

Del Rosario, in Spanish and Italian languages, and do Rosário in Portuguese language (English: of the rosary) is a surname that has as its etymology, the Latin preposition, "de" meaning "of the" and the Latin noun "rosarium", meaning "rosegarden" or "garland of roses" but in this case, takes the meaning of "rosary", the Roman Catholic devotion to the Virgin Mary.

The name's origins are in the Middle Ages, around the 12th century, and it is much associated with the cult of the Virgin Mary at the time when the rose became part of the holy aura, which surrounded anything to do with Mary, and Our Lady of the Rosary's Feast of the Holy Rosary. This surname is common in Romance languages regions, and is also one of the most common surnames in the Philippines and other islands of the Spanish East Indies since the mid-19th century, where it is one of the most popular clans together with Cruz, Santos, Reyes, Gonzales, Bautista, García, Mendoza, Aquino, and others, because there are so many people that have this surname.

== People with the surname del Rosario ==
- Albert del Rosario (1939–2023), Filipino diplomat, former Secretary of Foreign Affairs for the Philippines
- Anacleto del Rosario (1860–1895), Filipino chemist
- Ella del Rosario, Spanish-American-Filipina recording artist
- Andrea del Rosario (born 1977), Filipina actress, model and politician
- Anton del Rosario (born 1981), American-born Filipino footballer
- Antonio del Rosario (born 1946), Filipino politician
- Aric del Rosario (1940–2020), Filipino basketball player and coach
- Enerio del Rosario (born 1985), Dominican Major League Baseball pitcher
- Francisco del Rosario Sánchez (1817–1861), Dominican politician
- Gina del Rosario (born 1986), Dominican female volleyball player, twin sister of Ginnette Del Rosario
- Ginnette del Rosario (born 1986), Dominican female volleyball player, twin sister of Gina Del Rosario
- Manuel del Rosario (1915–2009), Filipino prelate of the Roman Catholic Church
- Maria Beatriz del Rosario Arroyo (1884–1957), Filipino nun
- María del Rosario de Silva, Duchess of Alba (1900–1934), Spanish aristocrat and socialite
- María del Rosario Espinoza (born 1987), Mexican taekwondo practitioner
- Rosario Weiss Zorrilla, born Maria del Rosario Weiss (1814–1843), Spanish painter and engraver, possibly a daughter of Francisco Goya
- Martin del Rosario (born 1992), Filipino actor
- Monsour del Rosario (born 1965), Filipino taekwondo champion
- Raquel del Rosario (born 1982), Spanish singer
- Rosa del Rosario (1917–2005), Filipina film actress
- Shane del Rosario (1983–2013), American mixed martial artist and kickboxer
- Tomás del Rosario (1857–1913), Filipino judge and politician

== People with the surname do Rosário ==
- Arthur Bispo do Rosário (1909 or 1911–1989), Brazilian artist
- Carlos Agostinho do Rosário (born 1954), Prime Minister of Mozambique
- Filipe Neri António Sebastião do Rosário Ferrão (born 1953), Roman Catholic prelate, Patriarch of the East Indies and Archbishop of Goa and Daman
- Gualberto do Rosário (born 1950), former Prime Minister of Cape Verde
- Hélder Miguel do Rosário (born 1980), Portuguese footballer
- Maria do Rosário (born 1966), Brazilian teacher and politician

== See also ==
- Rosario (surname)
