= El Rosario =

El Rosario may refer to:

== Places ==
=== Argentina ===
- El Rosario, Catamarca, a municipality in Catamarca Province

=== Colombia ===
- El Rosario, Nariño, a municipality in the Nariño Department

=== Costa Rica ===
- El Rosario District

=== El Salvador ===
- El Rosario, Cuscatlán, a municipality in the Cuscatlán department
- El Rosario, La Paz, a municipality in the La Paz department
- El Rosario, Morazán, a municipality in the Morazán department

=== Guatemala ===
- El Rosario Lake, in El Rosario National Park

=== Honduras ===
- El Rosario, Comayagua, a municipality in the department of Comayagua.
- El Rosario, Olancho, a municipality in the department of Olancho.

=== Mexico ===
- El Rosario, Baja California, a municipality in the Baja California.
- El Rosario, Sinaloa, a municipality in the state of Sinaloa.
- El Rosario metro station, a station of the Mexico City Metro
- El Rosario (Mexico City Metrobús), a BRT station in Mexico City
- Misión Nuestra Señora del Santísimo Rosario de Viñadaco

=== Nicaragua ===
- El Rosario, Carazo, a municipality in the Carazo department of Nicaragua

=== Spain ===
- El Rosario, Tenerife, a municipality in the island of Tenerife in the province of Santa Cruz de Tenerife, on the Canary Islands

== Other ==
- El rosario, 1944 Mexican romantic drama film directed by Juan José Ortega

== See also ==
- Rosario (disambiguation)
