= Azócar =

Azócar is a surname of Basque origins. Notable people with the surname include:

- Jose Azocar (born 1996), Venezuelan baseball player
- Juan Carlos Azócar (born 1995), Venezuelan footballer
- Oscar Azócar (1965–2010), Venezuelan baseball player
- Patricio Aylwin Azócar (1918–2016), Chilean president
