= Rosario (disambiguation) =

Rosario is the largest city of the province of Santa Fe, and the third-largest city in Argentina.

Rosario (Spanish for "Rosary") may also refer to:

== People ==
- Rosario (given name)
- Rosario (surname)

== Places ==
=== Mexico ===
- Rosario Municipality, Chihuahua
- Rosario Municipality, Sinaloa
- Rosario, Sonora, town

=== Philippines ===
- Rosario, Agusan del Sur, municipality
- Rosario, Batangas, municipality
- Rosario, Cavite, municipality
- Rosario, La Union, municipality
- Rosario, Northern Samar, municipality
- Barangay Rosario in Pasig City

=== United States ===
- Rosario, Washington, unincorporated community
- Rosario Strait, a body of water in the San Juan Islands of Washington State

=== Other countries ===
- Rosario de la Frontera, Salta Province, Argentina
- Rosário do Sul, Rio Grande do Sul, Brazil
- Altos del Rosario, Bolívar Department, Colombia
- Villa del Rosario, Paraguay
- Puerto del Rosario, the capital of Fuerteventura island, Canary Islands, Spain
- Rosario, Uruguay
- La Villa del Rosario, Venezuela

== Other ==
- HMS Rosario, the name of seven ships of the Royal Navy
- Rosario (1935 film), a Mexican film from 1935
- Rosario (2010 film), a Filipino film
- Rosario (2025 film), an American film
- Rosario (1969 TV series), Mexican telenovela
- Rosario (2013 TV series), American-Venezuelan telenovela
- Rosario Youth Club F.C., a Northern Irish football club
- Rosario (estate), the former estate of Seattle mayor and shipbuilder Robert Moran

== See also ==
- El Rosario (disambiguation)
- Rosary
