= CJ Abrams =

American baseball player (born 2000)

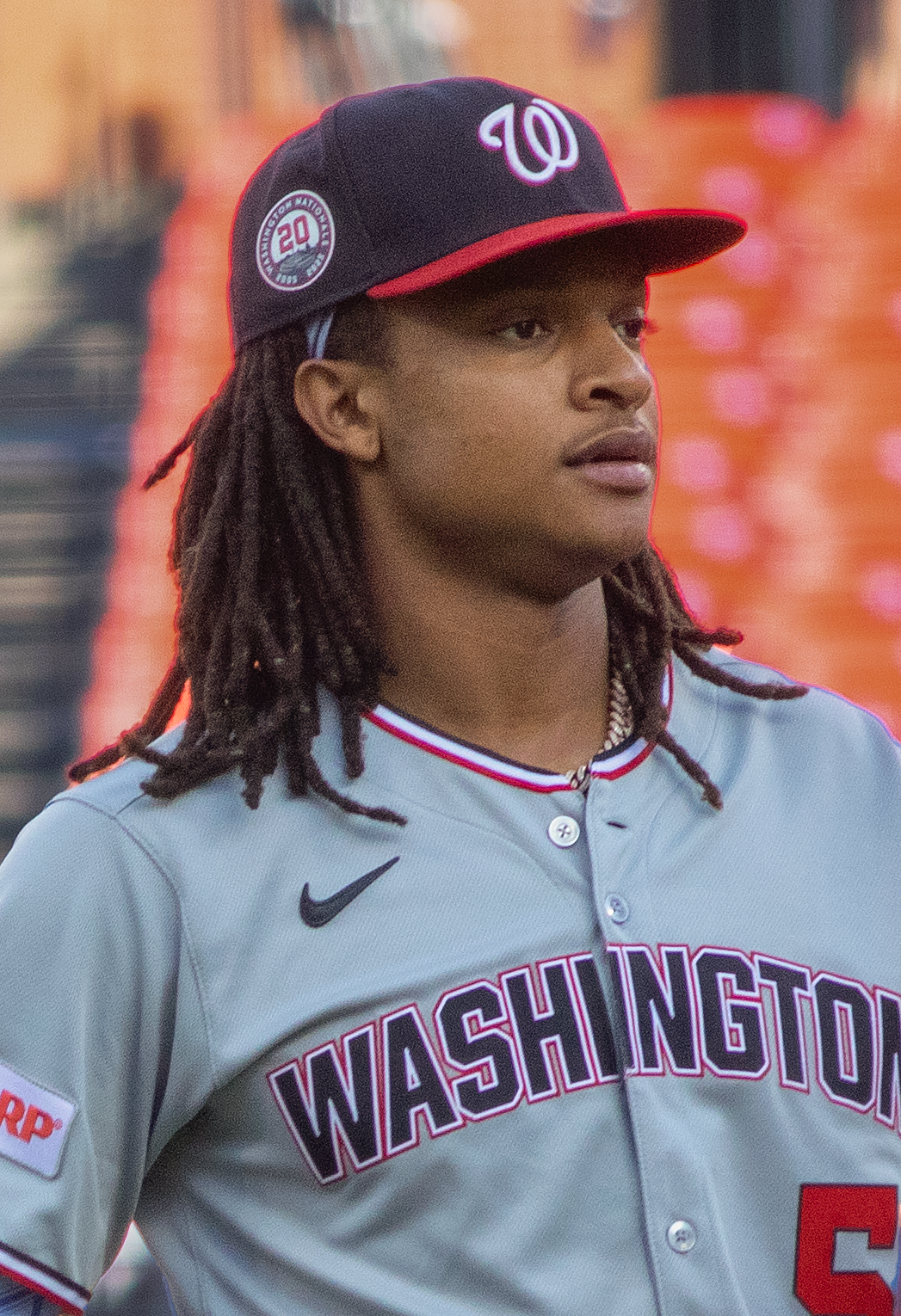
- Abrams with the Nationals in 2025

Washington Nationals – No. 5
- Shortstop
- Born: October 3, 2000 (age 26); Alpharetta, Georgia, U.S.
- Bats: Left Throws: Right

MLB debut
- April 8, 2022, for the San Diego Padres

MLB statistics (through 2026 season)
- Batting average: .252
- Home runs: 92
- Runs batted in: 316
- Stolen bases: 150
- Stats at Baseball Reference

Teams
- San Diego Padres (2022); Washington Nationals (2022–present)

Career highlights and awards
- 2× All-Star (2024, 2026)

Paul Christopher Abrams Jr. (born October 3, 2000) is an American professional baseball shortstop for the Washington Nationals of Major League Baseball (MLB). He made his MLB debut in 2022 with the San Diego Padres. Abrams was named an All-Star in 2024 and 2026.

== Amateur career ==
Abrams attended Blessed Trinity Catholic High School in Roswell, Georgia. In 2018, he played for Team USA in the U-18 Pan-American Championships, making the All-Tournament team and helping the U.S. win the gold medal. As a senior in 2019, he was the Georgia Gatorade Baseball Player of the Year after hitting .431 with three home runs and 27 runs batted in (RBI). He committed to play college baseball at the University of Alabama, but did not attend, opting instead for a professional career.

== Professional career ==
=== San Diego Padres ===
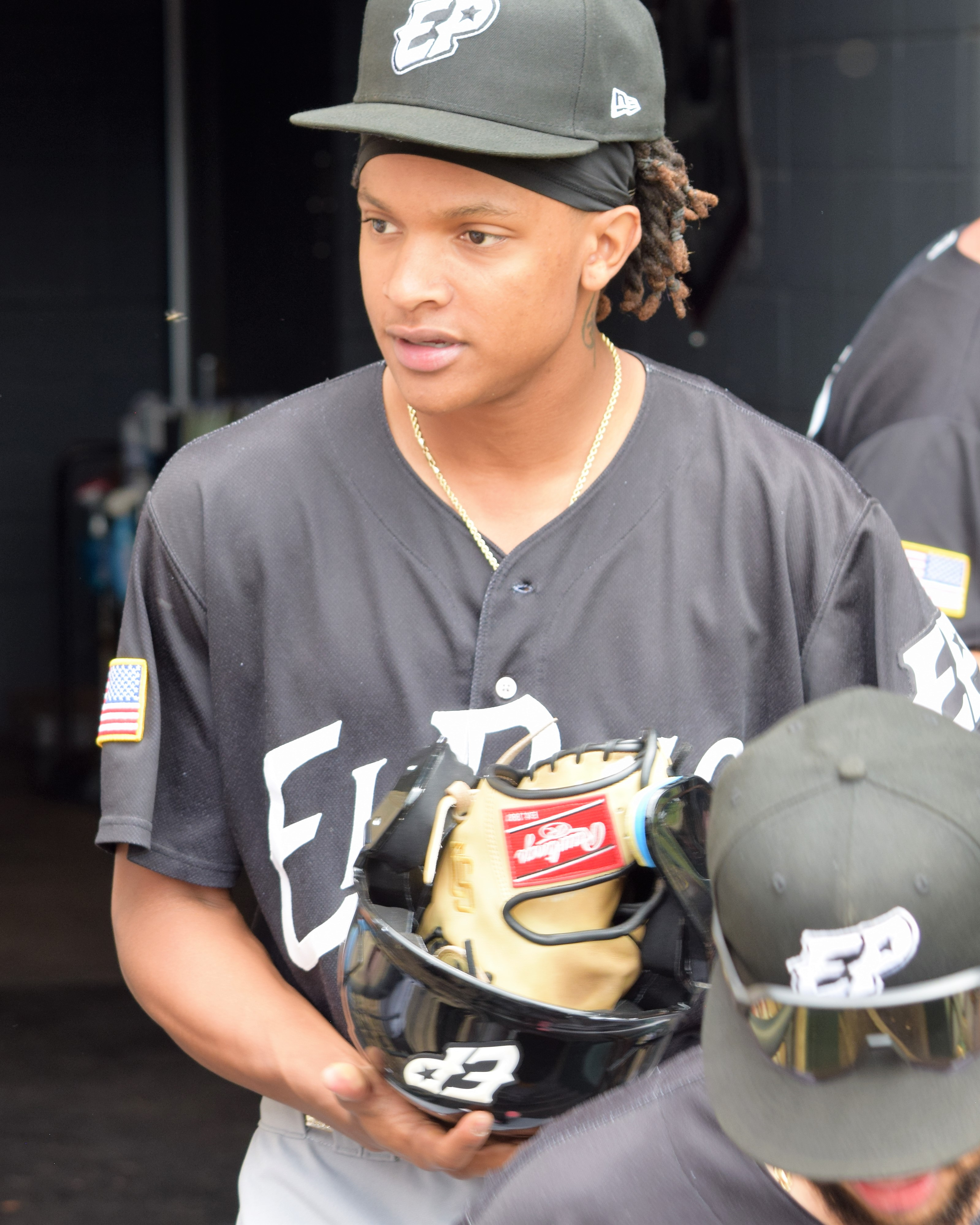
Abrams with the Chihuahuas in 2022

Abrams was considered one of the top prospects for the 2019 Major League Baseball draft. The San Diego Padres selected Abrams in the first round, with the sixth overall pick. He signed with the Padres on June 8 for $5.2 million, and was assigned to the Arizona League Padres, where he hit safely in his first twenty games. In August, he was promoted to the Fort Wayne TinCaps. He was placed on the injured list four days following the promotion due to a shoulder injury. Over 34 games between the two clubs, Abrams batted .393/.436/.647 with three home runs, 22 RBIs, and 15 stolen bases. Abrams did not play in a game in 2020 due to the cancellation of the minor league season because of the COVID-19 pandemic.

Abrams was assigned to the Double-A San Antonio Missions to begin the 2021 season. In June 2021, Abrams was selected to play in the All-Star Futures Game. In a June 30 game against the Corpus Christi Hooks, Abrams collided with second baseman Eguy Rosario at second base attempting to field a ground ball up the middle and had to be helped off of the field. On July 4, Abrams was diagnosed with a fractured left tibia and sprained medial collateral ligament, ending his 2021 season. In 42 games with the Missions, Abrams had hit .296/.363/.420 with two home runs and 23 RBIs.

On April 7, 2022, the Padres selected Abrams' contract, adding him to their Opening Day roster. He made his major league debut on April 8. On April 14, Abrams hit his first career home run off of Atlanta Braves starter Charlie Morton.

=== Washington Nationals ===
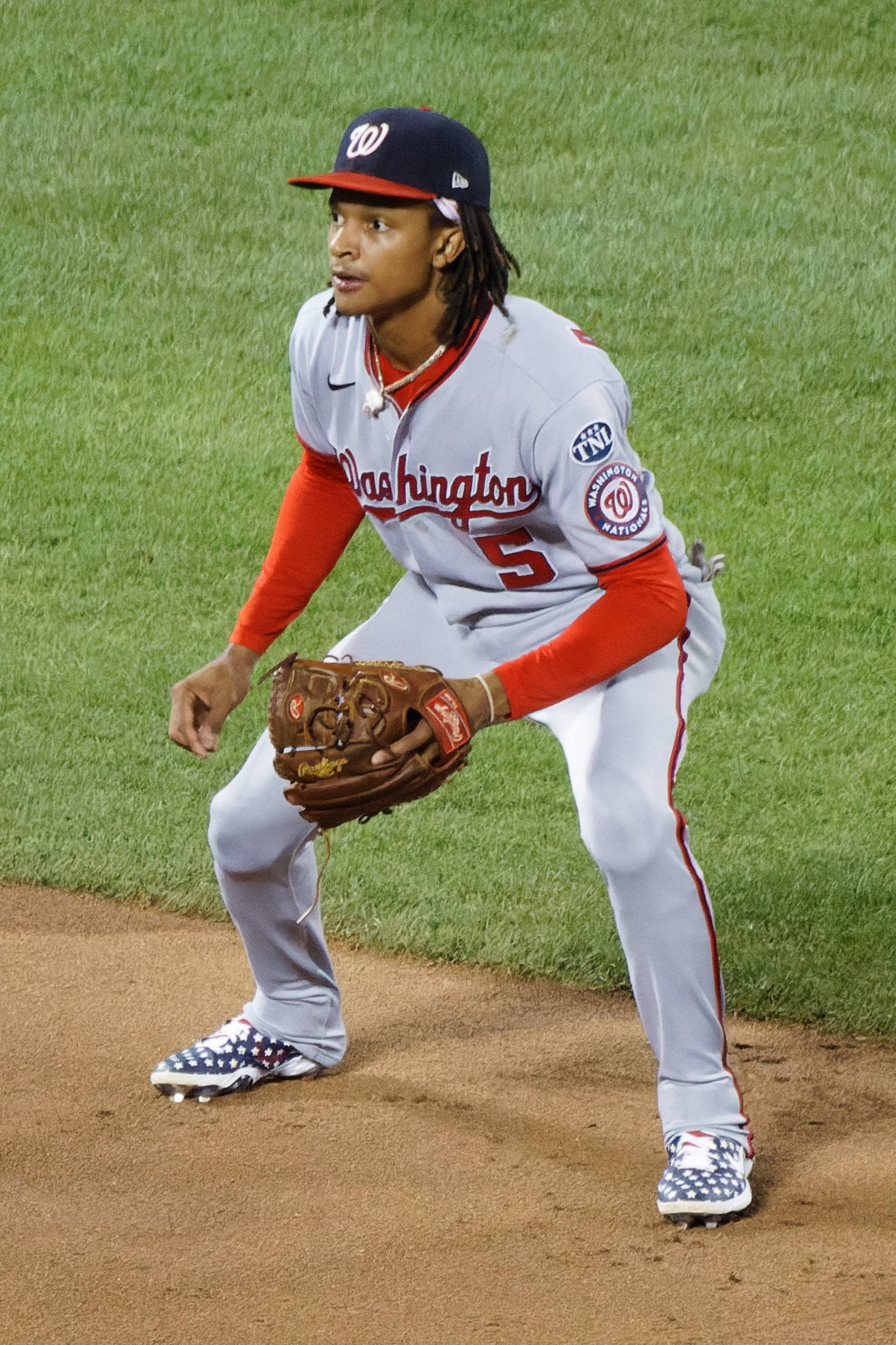
Abrams ready to field at shortstop, July 29, 2023

On August 2, 2022, Abrams, along with James Wood, MacKenzie Gore, Robert Hassell III, Jarlín Susana and Luke Voit were traded to the Washington Nationals in exchange for Juan Soto and Josh Bell. After the trade, Abrams was assigned to the Nationals' Triple–A affiliate, the Rochester Red Wings. He was promoted to the major leagues later that month and made his debut for the Nationals on August 15, 2022.

In his first full season with the Nationals in 2023, Abrams established himself as one of the league's most promising young shortstops, hitting .245 with 18 home runs and 47 stolen bases (fifth in MLB), while primarily batting leadoff.

In 2024, Abrams was named to the National League All-Star Team, marking his first All-Star appearance. In 138 games for Washington, he slashed .246/.314/.433 with 20 home runs, 65 RBI, and 31 stolen bases. On September 20, 2024, Abrams was optioned to the rookie-level Florida Complex League Nationals after reportedly staying up until 8 a.m. at a casino in Chicago on the same day the Nationals had a 1:20 p.m. game.

For the 2025 season Abrams slashed .257/.315/.433 with 19 home runs, 60 RBI, and 31 stolen bases.

In 2026 Abrams was named to the National League All-Star Team for the second time, and broke all of his previous career highs, slashing .261/.336/.497, with an OPS of .834 and 33 home runs. He led the league in RBI for part of the season, and ended the season fifth, with 106 RBI. The home run and RBI totals were both franchise records for a Nationals shortstop. For the last six weeks of the season, Abrams split time playing shortstop and second base.

== Personal life ==
Abrams is named after his father, Paul Christopher Abrams Sr. His father is known as "Chris"; the younger Abrams' nickname is short for "Chris Junior".

Awards and achievements
Preceded by Pete Crow-Armstrong	National League Player of the Month; July 2026	Succeeded by Pete Crow-Armstrong
