= Jerry Rosario =

Indian Jesuit priest (born 1952)

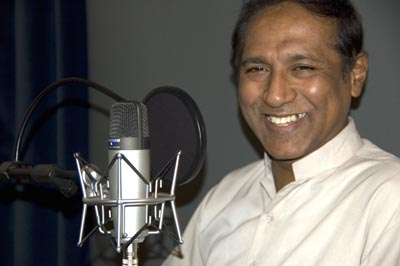
- Born: 2 October 1952 (age 73); Tamil Nadu, India
- Occupations: Catholic Priest, writer
- Writing career
- Genre: Sociology Philosophy Religious
- Notable works: Dhaanam, All the Best, Whisper With Fire, Gaining Momentum

Jerry Rosario (Tamil: ஜெரி ரொசாரியோ; born 2 October 1952) is an Indian Jesuit priest (from the Tamil Nadu area), a theologian, a pastor, spiritual counselor, a writer, a social activist, a motivator, a civil lawyer, a retreat- facilitator. And also, founder-director of five movements (DHAANAM for human donations, JEPASA for socio-pastoral animation, IGFA for Ignatian spirituality, FOJET for the former Jesuits in Tamil Nadu and MANITHAM for political analysis and action)

He has completed a Bachelor of Science (B.Sc.) in Rural Development Science, an MA in Political Science, Bachelor of Laws (LLB) in Bangalore, PhD in Political Philosophy with Theology. He is a faculty-member of the Dhyana Ashram, Chennai.

== Socio-Pastoral Activities ==
Jerry has done 23 years of insertional and involved services among the dalits, rural and slum poor. He has a doctorate in political theology. Other studies and searches have made him a pastor, professor, motivator, spiritual counselor, social analyst, writer and retreat facilitator. He is also a civil lawyer.

He is well known to many as "barefoot priest," because he has given up wearing footwear in solidarity with those dalits and poorest who are deprived the right to wear it by caste-ridden traditions. He is a visiting professor in 37 institutions and has lectured in 43 countries so far.

== Periyarism ==
Fr. Jerry Rosario has a doctorate in Periyarism. The philosophy of Thanthai E.V.Ramaswamy Periyar, who undertook a political analysis of Hinduism, Buddhism, Islam and Christianity, and had birthed a "Self-respect movement" in Tamil Nadu and in other parts of South India. '

== Author ==
Books authored by Fr. Jerry Rosario have been published through Vaigarai Publications and other publishing houses. Dr. Jerry has so far authored 101 books, of which 38 books are in English and 63 are in Tamil. Seventeen of his books have become textbooks for Students of various autonomous colleges and universities. To date, nine students have completed their M.Phil. researches based on Dr.Jerry's thoughts and defended their theses in various secular universities. Three have gone ahead with doctorate research on Dr. Jerry's books.

Jerry is also Founder of movements which are JEPASA (Jesuit Pastors of South Asia), for socio-pastoral animation; DHANAM, for human organ donations; MANITHAM, for political analysis and action; and IGFA (Ignatian Family), for cosmic Ignatian spirituality, FOJET for the networking with former Jesuits in Tamil Nadu.

Jerry donated his O-Rh Negative Blood 227 times as on 24th March, 2026.
