= El Rosario, Catamarca =

Coordinates: 27°59′36″S 65°41′26″W

El Rosario
- Municipality and village
- Interactive map of El Rosario
- Country: Argentina
- Province: Catamarca Province
- Time zone: UTC−3 (ART)

El Rosario is a village and municipality in Catamarca Province in northwestern Argentina.
