= Tayler Scott =

South African baseball player (born 1992)

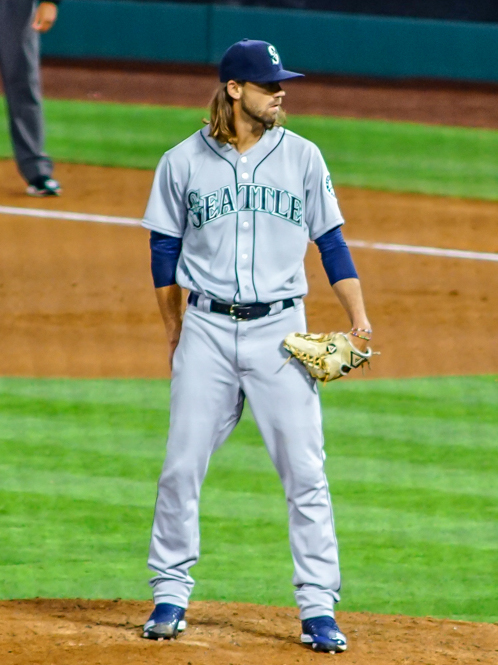
- Scott with the Seattle Mariners in 2019

Algodoneros de Unión Laguna – No. 50
- Pitcher
- Born: 1 June 1992 (age 34); Johannesburg, South Africa
- Bats: Right Throws: Right

Professional debut
- MLB: June 8, 2019, for the Seattle Mariners
- NPB: June 19, 2020, for the Hiroshima Toyo Carp

MLB statistics (through 2025 season)
- Win–loss record: 8–6
- Earned run average: 5.51
- Strikeouts: 139

NPB statistics (through 2020 season)
- Win–loss record: 0–3
- Earned run average: 15.75
- Strikeouts: 7
- Stats at Baseball Reference

Teams
- Seattle Mariners (2019); Baltimore Orioles (2019); Hiroshima Toyo Carp (2020–2021); San Diego Padres (2022); Los Angeles Dodgers (2023); Boston Red Sox (2023); Oakland Athletics (2023); Houston Astros (2024–2025); Arizona Diamondbacks (2025); Houston Astros (2025)

Tayler James Scott (born 1 June 1992) is a South African professional baseball pitcher for the Algodoneros de Unión Laguna of the Mexican League. He has previously played in Major League Baseball (MLB) for the Seattle Mariners, Baltimore Orioles, San Diego Padres, Los Angeles Dodgers, Boston Red Sox, Oakland Athletics, Houston Astros, and Arizona Diamondbacks, and in Nippon Professional Baseball (NPB) for the Hiroshima Toyo Carp. He is the first South African baseball pitcher in MLB and NPB history.

== Career ==
Scott was born and raised in Johannesburg, South Africa. He moved to the United States when he was 16 to attend high school and play baseball. After moving, he attended Notre Dame Prep High School in Scottsdale, Arizona. Scott initially committed to play college baseball at Arizona.

=== Chicago Cubs ===
Scott was drafted by the Chicago Cubs in the 5th round of the 2011 MLB draft.

Scott played in the Cubs organization from 2011 through the 2015 season. During his time with them, he played for the AZL Cubs, Boise Hawks, Kane County Cougars, Daytona Cubs, Myrtle Beach Pelicans, and the Tennessee Smokies. He was released by the Cubs on 30 March 2016.

=== Sioux City Explorers ===
On 21 April 2016, Scott signed with the Sioux City Explorers of the American Association of Independent Professional Baseball, an independent baseball league. In 17 relief appearances, he pitched to a 1.88 ERA while striking out 32 batters in 28 2/3 innings.

=== Milwaukee Brewers ===
On 6 July 2016, Scott signed a minor league contract with the Milwaukee Brewers. During 2016, he played for the Double-A Biloxi Shuckers of the Southern League and the Salt River Rafters of the Arizona Fall League, and returned to Biloxi to begin the 2017 season.

=== Texas Rangers ===
On 31 July 2017, Scott was traded to the Texas Rangers in exchange for Jeremy Jeffress. He played for the Round Rock Express in 2017.

Scott spent the entirety of 2018 with Triple–A Round Rock, appearing in 44 contests and pitching to a 5–5 record and 3.26 ERA with 52 strikeouts across 60 2/3 innings pitched. He elected free agency following the season on 2 November 2018.

=== Seattle Mariners ===
Scott became a free agent after the 2018 season, and signed a minor-league contract with the Seattle Mariners on 24 January 2019. He opened the 2019 season with the Tacoma Rainiers.

Scott was called up to the major leagues for the first time on 7 June 2019. He made his major-league debut on 8 June, becoming the first South African pitcher in MLB history. He pitched 2 2/3 innings in his debut, against the Los Angeles Angels, allowing three runs on four hits. His first strikeout was against Wilfredo Tovar.

=== Baltimore Orioles ===
On 25 June 2019, Scott was claimed off waivers by the Baltimore Orioles. In eight appearances for the Orioles, Scott struggled to an 18.69 ERA with 7 strikeouts in 8 2/3 innings of work. He was markedly better with the Triple–A Norfolk Tides, registering a 0.56 ERA with 21 strikeouts across 13 appearances. On 30 October, Scott was removed from the 40-man roster and sent outright to Triple–A Norfolk. He elected free agency on 4 November.

=== Hiroshima Toyo Carp ===
On 1 December 2019, Scott signed a one-year contract with the Hiroshima Toyo Carp of Nippon Professional Baseball (NPB). In 2020, Scott struggled to a 15.75 ERA in 7 games for Hiroshima. Scott did not appear in a regular season game for the Carp in 2021 and became a free agent after the season.

=== San Diego Padres ===
On 7 March 2022, Scott signed a minor league contract with the San Diego Padres organization. On 3 July, the Padres selected Scott's contract, adding him to their active roster. In eight appearances for San Diego, he struggled to an 0–1 record and 6.75 ERA with 13 strikeouts over 12 innings of work. On 11 September, Scott was designated for assignment following Craig Stammen's activation from the injured list.

=== Philadelphia Phillies ===
On 14 September 2022, Scott was claimed off waivers by the Philadelphia Phillies. In four appearances for the Triple–A Lehigh Valley IronPigs, Scott struggled to a 15.00 ERA with four strikeouts in three innings of work. He was designated for assignment on 16 December, after the Phillies signed Taijuan Walker. Scott cleared waivers and was sent outright to Triple–A on 23 December; however, he declined the assignment and became a free agent.

=== Los Angeles Dodgers ===
On 7 January 2023, Scott signed a minor-league contract with the Los Angeles Dodgers. He began the season with Triple-A Oklahoma City, allowing only two earned runs in 16 2/3 innings before he was called up to the majors on 22 May. He pitched six innings across six games for the Dodgers, posting a 9.00 ERA before he was designated for assignment on 17 June.

=== Boston Red Sox ===
On 22 June 2023, Scott was traded to the Boston Red Sox in exchange for cash considerations; he was assigned to the Triple-A Worcester Red Sox. On 4 July, Scott was added to Boston's active roster. In four games for Boston, Scott pitched 3 2/3 innings and surrendered three runs (two earned) on six hits and four walks with two strikeouts. He was designated for assignment on 16 July.

=== Oakland Athletics ===
On 19 July 2023, Scott was claimed off waivers by the Oakland Athletics. In 8 games for Oakland, he registered a 3.38 ERA with 7 strikeouts in 8 innings of work. Following the season on 6 November, Scott was removed from the 40–man roster and sent outright to the Triple–A Las Vegas Aviators. He elected free agency the same day.

=== Houston Astros ===
Tayler Scott pitches in a game against the St. Louis Cardinals, April 14, 2025.

On 12 December 2023, Scott signed a minor-league contract with the Houston Astros. On 28 March 2024, Scott had his contract selected after making Houston's Opening Day roster. Scott earned his first major league win on 2 May when he tossed 1 1/3 scoreless innings versus the Cleveland Guardians to support an 8–2 final. The Astros placed Scott on the 15-day injured list on 21 September due to a thoracic spine strain. Through the point of the roster move, Scott had made the third-most appearances for the Astros and had produced a 2.23 ERA, 71 strikeouts, a 25.2% strikeout rate, and a 3.5% barrel rate over his 68 2/3 innings. He did struggle with walks, however, at 12.4%.

Scott made 17 appearances for the Astros in 2025, posting a 1–2 record and 5.40 ERA with 16 strikeouts across 16 2/3 innings pitched. Scott was designated for assignment by the Astros on 14 May 2025. On 21 May, Scott cleared waivers and elected free agency, rejecting the outright assignment to the Triple-A Sugar Land Space Cowboys.

=== Arizona Diamondbacks ===
On 31 May 2025, Scott signed a minor league contract with the Arizona Diamondbacks. He made three scoreless appearances for the Triple-A Reno Aces before being added to Arizona's active roster on 10 June. In nine appearances for Arizona, Scott struggled to a 9.00 ERA with seven strikeouts over nine innings of work. On 28 June, Scott was designated for assignment by the Diamondbacks. He elected free agency after clearing waivers on 1 July.

=== Houston Astros (second stint) ===
On 4 July 2025, Scott signed a minor league contract with the Houston Astros. In 11 appearances for the Triple-A Sugar Land Space Cowboys, he logged an 0–2 record and 4.91 ERA with 11 strikeouts and two saves over 11 innings of work. On 18 August, the Astros selected Scott's contract, adding him to their active roster. He allowed five runs across 1 1/3 innings of a 10–0 loss to the Detroit Tigers, and was designated for assignment the following day. Scott cleared waivers and was sent outright to Triple-A Sugar Land on 22 August. He elected free agency on 6 October.

=== Atlanta Braves ===
On 27 December 2025, Scott signed a minor league contract with the Atlanta Braves. He began the 2026 season with the Triple–A Gwinnett Stripers, pitching in 14 contests and registering a 9.20 ERA with 19 strikeouts across 14 2/3 innings pitched. On 16 May 2026, Scott was released by the Braves organization.

=== Algodoneros de Unión Laguna ===
On 14 June 2026, Scott signed with the Algodoneros de Unión Laguna of the Mexican League.
