= Nabil Crismatt =

Colombian baseball player (born 1994)

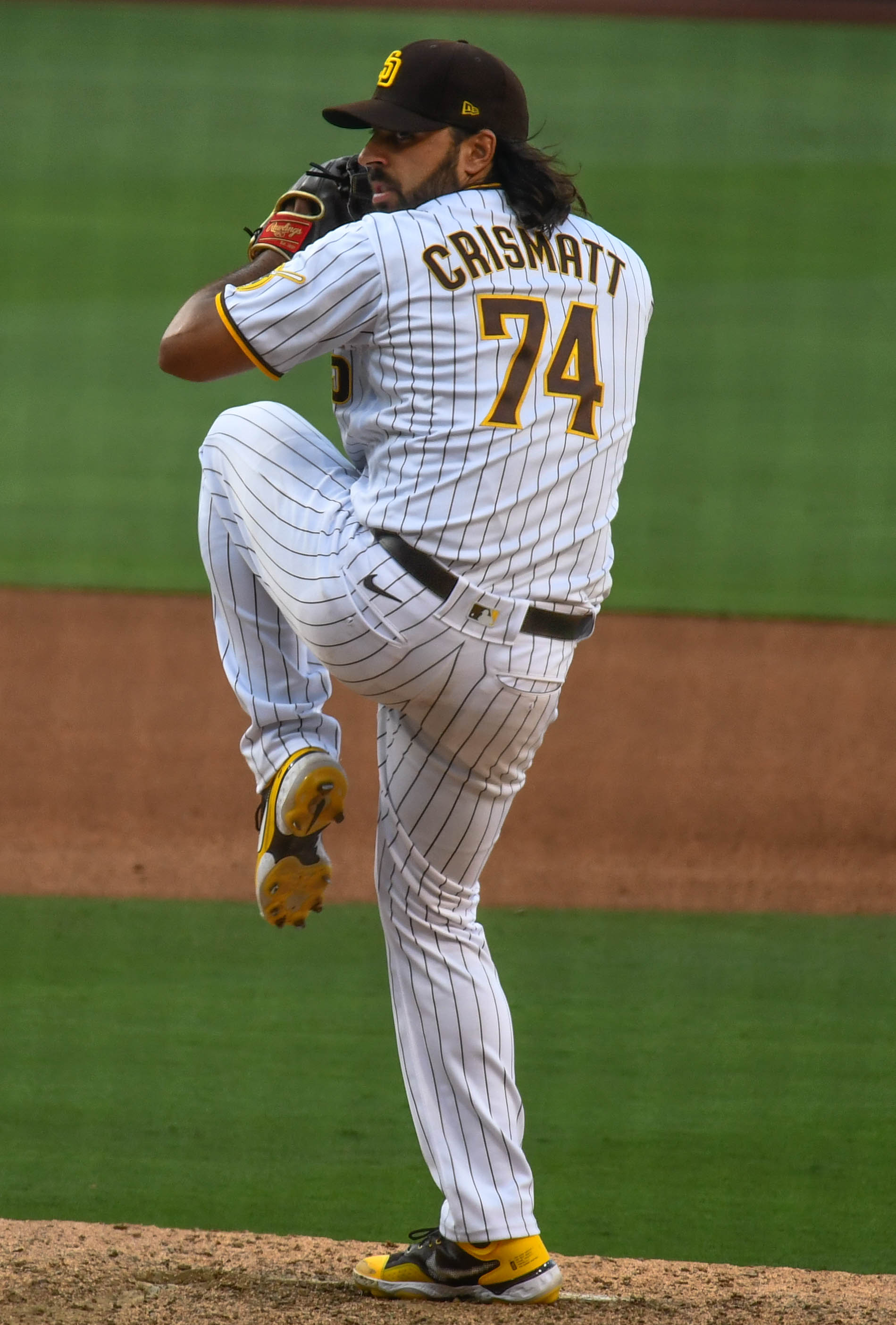
- Crismatt with the San Diego Padres in 2021

Free agent
- Pitcher
- Born: December 25, 1994 (age 31); Barranquilla, Colombia
- Bats: Right Throws: Right

MLB debut
- August 17, 2020, for the St. Louis Cardinals

MLB statistics (through 2025 season)
- Win–loss record: 12–6
- Earned run average: 3.71
- Strikeouts: 187
- Stats at Baseball Reference

Teams
- St. Louis Cardinals (2020); San Diego Padres (2021–2023); Arizona Diamondbacks (2023); Los Angeles Dodgers (2024); Arizona Diamondbacks (2025)

Nabil Antonio Crismatt Abuchaibe (born December 25, 1994) is a Colombian professional baseball pitcher who is a free agent. He has previously played in Major League Baseball (MLB) for the St. Louis Cardinals, San Diego Padres, Arizona Diamondbacks, and Los Angeles Dodgers.

== Career ==
=== New York Mets ===
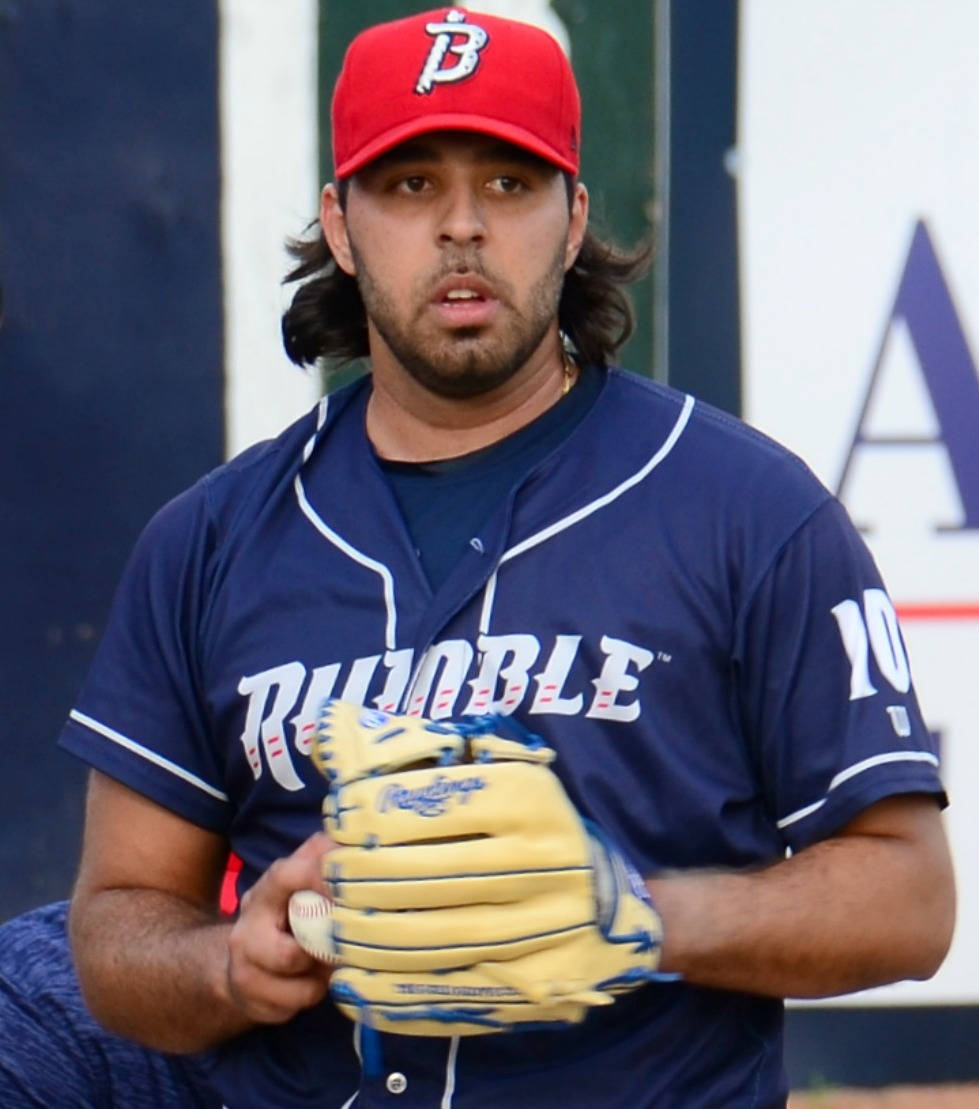
Crismatt with the Binghamton Rumble Ponies in 2018

On May 31, 2012, Crismatt signed with the New York Mets and made his professional debut that same season for the Dominican Summer League (DSL) Mets. In 19 relief appearances he had a 4–0 record with a 4.26 earned run average (ERA). He remained with the DSL Mets in 2013, where he compiled a 4–2 record and 1.33 ERA in 40 2/3 relief innings pitched and 2014 with the Gulf Coast League (GCL) Mets where he was 1–1 with a 2.25 ERA in 19 games out of the bullpen. In 2015, he pitched for the Kingsport Mets where he was 6–1 with a 2.90 ERA in 12 games (eight starts), and in 2016 he played with the Brooklyn Cyclones, Columbia Fireflies, and Binghamton Mets where he posted a combined 1–4 record and 2.47 ERA in 65 2/3 innings pitched. Crismatt spent 2017 with the St. Lucie Mets where he was 6–13 with a 3.95 ERA in 26 games (25 starts).

Crismatt split the 2018 season between Double–A Binghamton and the Triple–A Las Vegas 51s. In 27 starts between the two affiliates, he accumulated an 11–10 record and 5.00 ERA with 140 strikeouts across 144 innings pitched. Crismatt elected free agency following the season on November 2, 2018.

=== Seattle Mariners ===
On January 24, 2019, Crismatt signed a minor league contract with the Seattle Mariners. He split the 2019 season between the Double-A Arkansas Travelers and the Triple-A Tacoma Rainiers, compiling a 4–10 record and 5.04 ERA with 157 strikeouts over 27 games (21 starts). Crismatt elected free agency following the season on November 4.

=== St. Louis Cardinals ===
On November 19, 2019, Crismatt signed a minor league deal with the St. Louis Cardinals and was invited to major league spring training. When the 2020 minor league season was cancelled because of the COVID-19 pandemic, Crismatt was assigned to the Cardinals alternate site training camp. On August 17, he was selected to the active roster. He made his major league debut that day, in the second game of a doubleheader against the Chicago Cubs, throwing one scoreless inning. His first MLB strikeout was of Javier Báez. Crismatt pitched in six games for the Cardinals, allowing three runs in 8 1/3 innings and striking out eight batters. On October 30, 2020, Crismatt was outrighted off of the 40-man roster and he became a free agent on November 2, 2020.

=== San Diego Padres ===
On December 18, 2020, Crismatt signed a minor league contract with the San Diego Padres organization. On April 1, 2021, he was added to the major league roster. In 2021, he recorded a 3.76 ERA with 71 strikeouts in 81 1/3 innings. He recorded his first career win by pitching 2/3 of an inning against the Los Angeles Dodgers on April 22.

Crismatt made a career–high 50 appearances for San Diego in 2022, registering a 5–2 record and 2.94 ERA with 65 strikeouts in 67 1/3 innings of work. In seven games for the Padres in 2023, he struggled to a 9.82 ERA with 9 strikeouts in 11 innings pitched and was designated for assignment on June 20. On June 25, he cleared waivers and elected free agency in lieu of an outright assignment.

=== Arizona Diamondbacks ===
On June 30, 2023, Crismatt signed a minor league contract with the Arizona Diamondbacks organization. In seven games for the Triple–A Reno Aces, he posted an 8.04 ERA with 15 strikeouts in 15 2/3 innings pitched. He was released by the Diamondbacks on August 2 but re–signed a few days later on a new minor league deal. He was selected to the major league roster on August 22 but only made one appearance for Arizona, tossing two scoreless innings against the Cincinnati Reds on August 26 and was designated for assignment again the following day. He cleared waivers and was sent outright to Reno on August 29 and elected free agency on October 10.

=== Los Angeles Dodgers ===
On December 8, 2023, Crismatt signed a minor league contract with the Los Angeles Dodgers and was assigned to the Triple-A Oklahoma City Baseball Club to start the season. The Dodgers selected his contract on March 31, before he had appeared in any minor league games. He pitched two scoreless innings that day against the Cardinals, but was designated for assignment the following day and outrighted to Oklahoma City after clearing waivers on April 5. On April 27, the Dodgers added him back to the active roster. He pitched in four more games for them out of the bullpen, allowing two earned runs in five innings, before he was again designated for assignment on May 15. On May 17, the Dodgers again outrighted him to the minors, but he rejected the assignment in favor of free agency.

=== Texas Rangers ===
On May 22, 2024, Crismatt signed a minor league contract with the Texas Rangers. In eight games for the Triple–A Round Rock Express, he struggled to a 7.36 ERA with 10 strikeouts across 11 innings pitched. Crismatt was released by the Rangers organization on June 25.

=== San Diego Padres (second stint) ===
On June 28, 2024, Crismatt signed a minor league contract with the San Diego Padres. In 15 games (13 starts) for the Triple–A El Paso Chihuahuas, he logged a 1–3 record and 5.53 ERA with 50 strikeouts across 55 1/3 innings pitched. Crismatt elected free agency following the season on November 4.

=== Philadelphia Phillies ===
On December 13, 2024, Crismatt signed a minor league contract with the Philadelphia Phillies. In 15 starts for the Triple-A Lehigh Valley IronPigs, he posted a 4-5 record and 3.81 ERA with 54 strikeouts across 80 1/3 innings pitched. On July 3, 2025, Crismatt triggered an opt-out clause in his contract and was released by the Phillies. On July 7, Crismatt re-signed with the Phillies organization on a new minor league contract. He was released by the Phillies organization on August 4.

=== Arizona Diamondbacks (second stint) ===
On August 9, 2025, Crismatt signed a minor league contract with the Arizona Diamondbacks organization. After one scoreless appearance for the Triple-A Reno Aces, the Diamondbacks added Crismatt to their active roster on August 17. He started just his second career game against the Colorado Rockies, pitching 5 solid innings of 1-run ball, striking out 5 and walking just one, earning a no-decision. In eight total appearances for Arizona, Crismatt logged a 3-0 record and 3.71 ERA with 25 strikeouts over 34 innings of work. On September 26, Crismatt was designated for assignment by the Diamondbacks. He elected free agency on October 6.

=== Texas Rangers (second stint) ===
On December 28, 2025, Crismatt signed a minor league contract with the Texas Rangers. On February 12, 2026, it was announced that Crismatt would require elbow surgery. The following day, Crismatt's injury was specified as a torn ulnar collateral ligament suffered in his first bullpen session. He was released by the Rangers organization on July 18.

== International career ==
Crismatt has played winter baseball in Puerto Rico (2016), the Dominican (2018, 2020 2023 and 2024) and Mexico (2019). He was selected to the roster for the Colombia national baseball team at the 2015 Pan American Games, the 2017 World Baseball Classic, and the 2023 World Baseball Classic.
