= Matthew Batten =

American baseball player (born 1995)

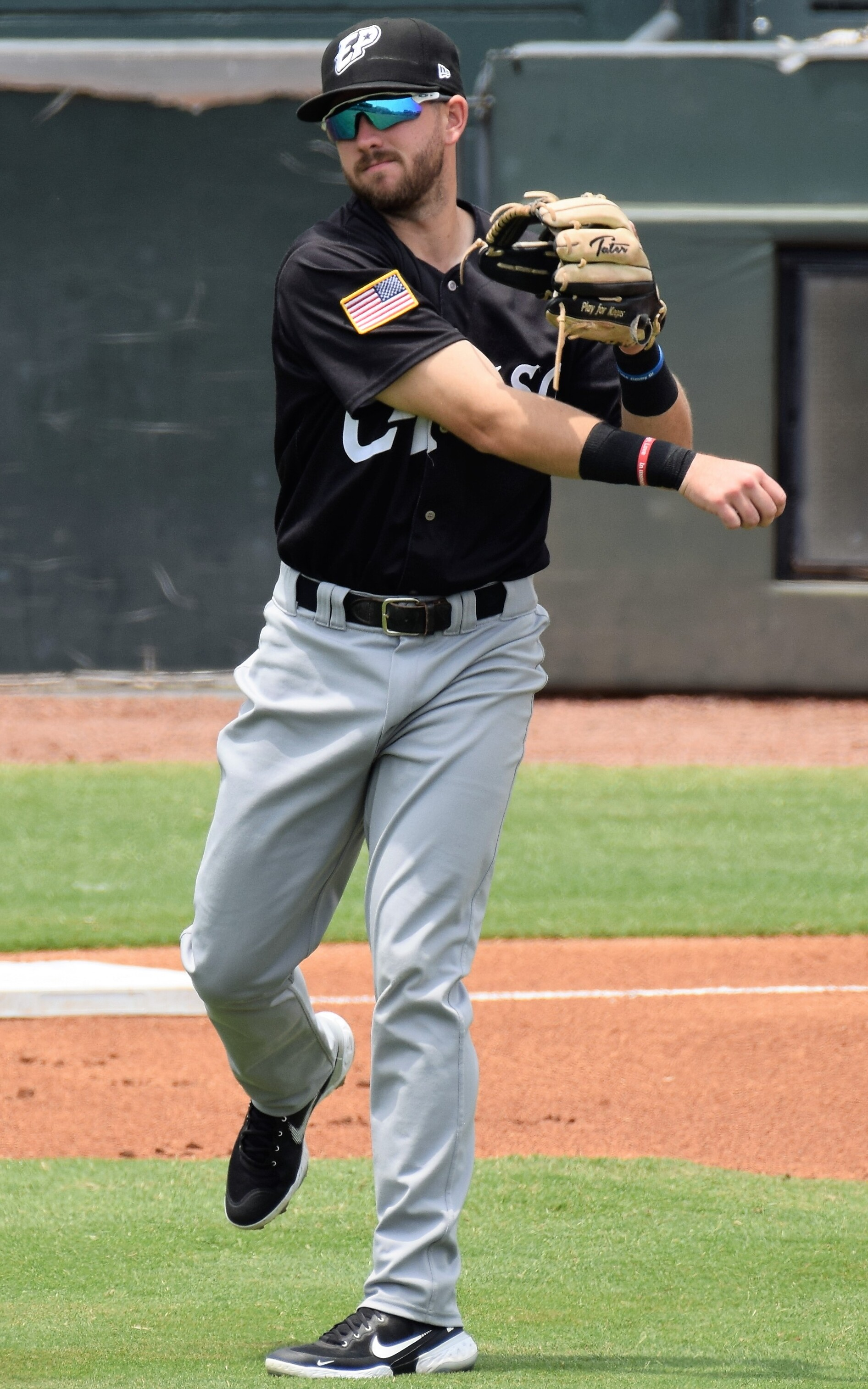
- Batten with the El Paso Chihuahuas in 2022

Rieleros de Aguascalientes – No. 6
- Infielder
- Born: June 22, 1995 (age 31); Shelton, Connecticut, U.S.
- Bats: Right Throws: Right

MLB debut
- June 30, 2022, for the San Diego Padres

MLB statistics (through 2024 season)
- Batting average: .239
- Home runs: 2
- Runs batted in: 12
- Stats at Baseball Reference

Teams
- San Diego Padres (2022–2024)

Matthew Albert Batten (born June 22, 1995) is an American professional baseball infielder for the Rieleros de Aguascalientes of the Mexican League. He has previously played in Major League Baseball (MLB) for the San Diego Padres.

== Early life ==
Batten was a member of the Shelton National Little League team that represented Shelton, Connecticut and the New England region at the 2008 Little League World Series.

== Amateur career ==
Batten attended St. Joseph High School in Trumbull, Connecticut, and played college baseball at Quinnipiac University. During his senior season at Quinnipiac, he set the record for most career hits in program history with 249, most career stolen bases with 65, and also led the team with a .305 average. After his senior year, he was selected by the San Diego Padres in the 32nd round of the 2017 Major League Baseball draft.

== Professional career ==
=== San Diego Padres ===
Batten signed with the Padres and split his first professional season between the Arizona League Padres and Tri-City Dust Devils, batting .241 with one home run and twenty RBI over 49 games. In 2018, he played with the Lake Elsinore Storm, San Antonio Missions, and El Paso Chihuahuas with whom he hit .272 with two home runs, 22 RBI, and 12 stolen bases over 78 games. He returned in 2019 to play two games with the Amarillo Sod Poodles and 109 games with El Paso, finishing the season batting .298 with six home runs, 48 RBI, and twenty doubles over 111 games. After not playing a game in 2020 due to the cancellation of the minor league season, he split the 2021 season between San Antonio and El Paso and slashed .293/.368/.382 with six home runs, 41 RBI, and 28 stolen bases over 123 games. He was selected to play in the Arizona Fall League for the Peoria Javelinas after the season. He opened the 2022 season with El Paso.

On June 30, 2022, the Padres selected Batten's contract and promoted him to the major leagues; he made his MLB debut that night as a pinch runner versus the Los Angeles Dodgers. On July 4, Batten recorded his first career hit, a pinch-hit single off of Ryan Borucki of the Seattle Mariners. On August 5, Batten made his first career pitching appearance in a game against the Los Angeles Dodgers. In the outing, he recorded his first career strikeout as a pitcher, punching out Dodgers starter Tyler Anderson.

Batten was optioned to Triple-A El Paso to begin the 2023 season. On July 4, 2023, Batten was recalled by the Padres, after Nelson Cruz was designated for assignment. In his first at-bat of the 2023 season, he hit a 2-run homerun to left field on July 8 vs. LHP David Peterson of the New York Mets. In 43 games for San Diego, Batten hit .258/.355/.358 with two home runs and 11 RBI. He was again optioned to Triple–A El Paso to begin the 2024 season. Batten appeared in one game for the Padres in 2024, and was designated for assignment on August 23. He cleared waivers and was sent outright to El Paso on August 25. Batten elected free agency following the season on November 4.

=== Atlanta Braves ===
On February 21, 2025, Batten signed a minor league contract with the Atlanta Braves. In 114 appearances for the Triple-A Gwinnett Stripers, Batten posted a .192/.264/.328 slash line with 11 home runs, 36 RBI, and 13 stolen bases. Batten elected free agency following the season on November 6.

On February 10, 2026, Batten signed with the Saraperos de Saltillo of the Mexican League. However, he failed to make the Opening Day roster and was released prior to the start of the season on April 14.

=== Rieleros de Aguascalientes ===
On May 7, 2026, Batten signed with the Rieleros de Aguascalientes of the Mexican League.
