= Hélder Rosário =

Portuguese footballer (born 1980)

Personal information
- Full name: Hélder Miguel do Rosário
- Date of birth: 9 March 1980 (age 46)
- Place of birth: Lisbon, Portugal
- Height: 1.80 m (5 ft 11 in)
- Position: Centre-back

Youth career
- 1994–1995: Costa do Estoril
- 1995–1996: Estoril Atlético
- 1996–1998: Vila Fria
- 1998–1999: Sporting CP

Senior career*
Years	Team	Apps	(Gls)
1999–2001	Sporting CP B	34	(2)
1999–2000	→ Lourinhanense (loan)	24	(0)
2001–2002	Maia	28	(1)
2002–2003	Farense	19	(1)
2003–2004	Belenenses	15	(0)
2004–2007	Boavista	68	(6)
2007–2012	Málaga	68	(3)
2012−2013	Ponferradina	0	(0)
Total		256	(13)
- * Club domestic league appearances and goals

Hélder Miguel do Rosário (born 9 March 1980; Portuguese pronunciation: [ˈɛldɛɾ ʁuˈzaɾiu]) is a Portuguese former professional footballer who played as a central defender.

== Club career ==
Born in Lisbon of Cape Verdean descent, Rosário started playing professionally with Sporting CP's farm team, S.C. Lourinhanense, then had a stint with the former's reserves. From 2001 to 2003, he had spells in the Segunda Liga with F.C. Maia and S.C. Farense.

Rosário made his Primeira Liga debut in the 2003–04 season with C.F. Os Belenenses, also scoring in a 3–1 away loss against S.L. Benfica in the semi-finals of the Taça de Portugal. In the following three years he was an important defensive element with Boavista FC, always in the Portuguese top flight.

Alongside countrymen Eliseu and Paulo Jorge, Rosário joined Málaga CF of the Spanish Segunda División for 2007–08, and would only miss three league games – out of 42 – during the campaign, adding goals in home matches against Córdoba CF (4–1 win) and Hércules CF (4–6 defeat, also being sent off) as the Andalusia club returned to La Liga after two years.

Rosário struggled with injuries and weight problems during his third year at the La Rosaleda Stadium, and made just two appearances in the Copa del Rey in the first part of the season. His league return only took place on 18 April 2010, in the 0–0 home draw with Real Valladolid.

In early 2011, Rosário and his compatriot Edinho were deemed surplus to requirements, being restricted to training with the first team. On 30 June 2012 his contract expired and he left, signing the following month with SD Ponferradina in the second tier. He left at the end of the campaign, having failed to play any games due to several physical ailments.
