= José Azócar =

Venezuelan baseball player (born 1996)

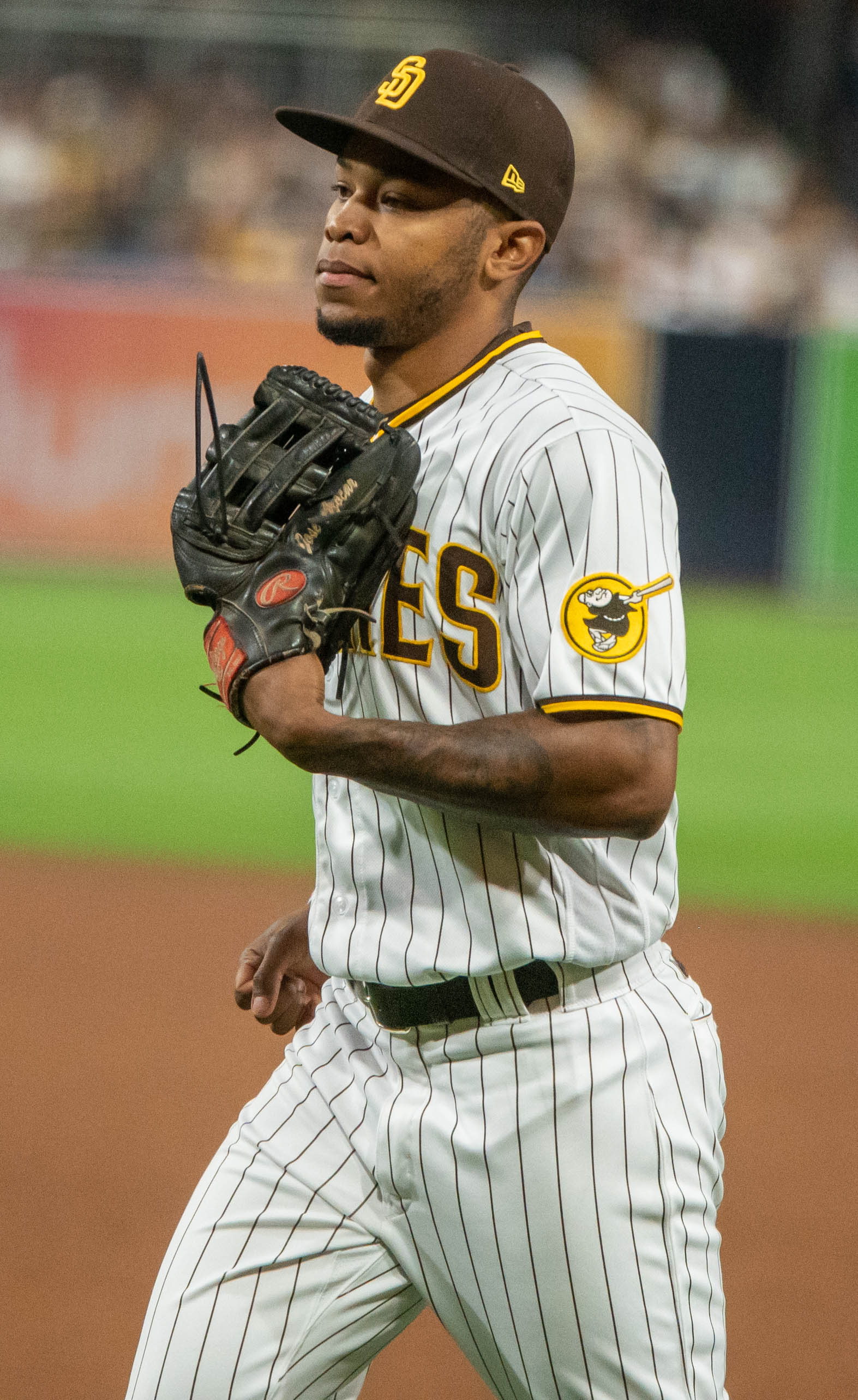
- Azócar with the Padres in 2022

Free agent
- Outfielder
- Born: May 11, 1996 (age 30); Güiria, Venezuela
- Bats: Right Throws: Right

MLB debut
- April 7, 2022, for the San Diego Padres

MLB statistics (through 2026 season)
- Batting average: .249
- Home runs: 2
- Runs batted in: 22
- Stats at Baseball Reference

Teams
- San Diego Padres (2022–2024); New York Mets (2025); Atlanta Braves (2025–2026)

José Enrique Azócar (born May 11, 1996) is a Venezuelan professional baseball outfielder who is a free agent. He has previously played in Major League Baseball (MLB) for the San Diego Padres, New York Mets, and Atlanta Braves.

== Career ==
=== Detroit Tigers ===
Azócar signed with the Detroit Tigers as an international free agent on October 21, 2012. He made his professional debut in 2013 with the Venezuelan Summer League Tigers. He joined the Low-A Connecticut Tigers in 2015 but was quickly sent down to the rookie-level Gulf Coast League Tigers, where he was named a 2015 Postseason All-Star. Azócar hit .325 with 29 RBI, 10 doubles, and five triples. His play warranted a call-up for the 2016 season to the Single-A West Michigan Whitecaps, where he spent the entire year. Azócar was promoted to the High-A Lakeland Flying Tigers for 2017, where he hit his first professional home runs (he would hit three), but saw his average drop from .281 in 2016 to .220 in 2017.

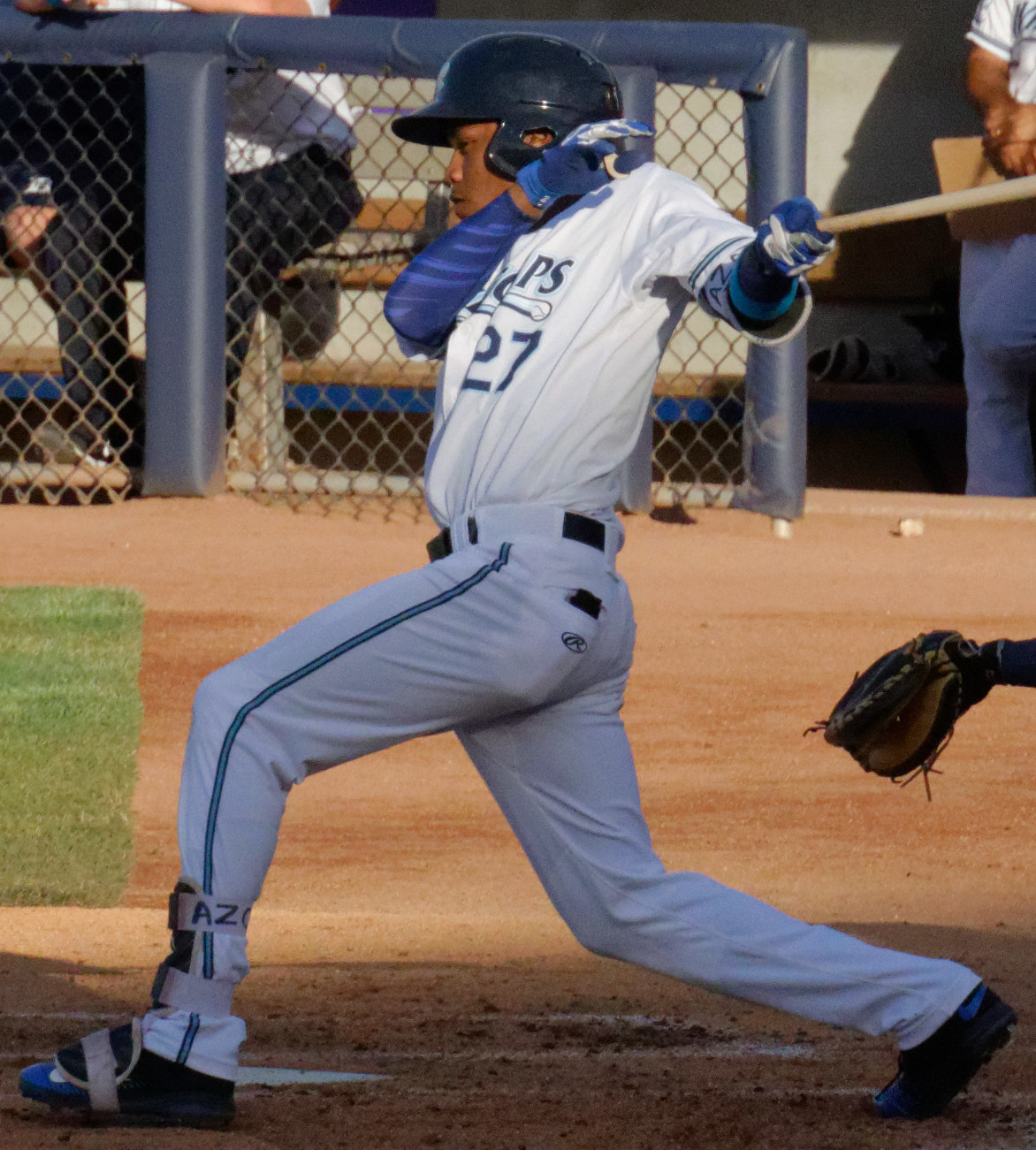
Azócar with the West Michigan Whitecaps in 2016

Azócar spent 2018 in both West Michigan and Lakeland. He started 2019 with the Double-A Erie SeaWolves. On May 11, he had the third-highest batting average in the Eastern League, at .336. He was batting .293 when, on June 24, he was named to the Eastern League All-Star Game. At the All-Star break, he led the league in hits with 136, was tied for third-highest batting average in the league (.284), had 39 multi-hit games, and had ten home runs to go with 56 RBI. Azócar would ultimately earn the dubious distinction of leading the minor leagues in 2019 by grounding into 22 double plays. However, he would be named the Eastern League Rookie of the Year for 2019, becoming the first SeaWolves' player to earn the honor. Azócar re-signed with the Tigers organization after becoming a minor league free agent on November 7, 2019. He did not play in 2020 due to the cancellation of the minor league season because of the COVID-19 pandemic. Azócar became a free agent on November 2, 2020.

=== San Diego Padres ===
On November 18, 2020, Azócar signed a minor league contract with the San Diego Padres. He split the 2021 season between the Double-A San Antonio Missions and Triple-A El Paso Chihuahuas. In 128 games with the two affiliates, he slashed .281/.341/.438 with nine home runs, 70 RBI, and 32 stolen bases.

On April 7, 2022, the Padres selected Azócar's contract to the major league roster. He made his MLB debut that night as a pinch runner and left fielder. He had his first major league hit two days later in his first plate appearance, a single to drive in his first run. Azócar appeared in two postseason games in the NLDS and one in the NLCS without a plate appearance. He served as a pinch runner and a replacement left fielder. He stole a base in Game 2 of the NLDS.

On September 15, 2023, Azócar hit his first major league home run, driving in 3 runs during the top of the ninth inning against the Oakland Athletics.

Azócar played in 61 games for the Padres in 2024, slashing .219/.269/.247, with two RBI and five stolen bases. He was designated for assignment by the Padres on September 2, 2024.

=== New York Mets ===
On September 5, 2024, Azócar was claimed off of waivers by the New York Mets. He was immediately sent to the Triple-A Syracuse Mets, for whom he batted .353 with two home runs and six stolen bases across 13 games.

Azócar was designated for assignment by the Mets on March 27, 2025. He cleared waivers and was sent outright to Triple-A Syracuse on March 29. On April 17, the Mets selected Azócar's contract, adding him to their active roster, after center fielder Jose Siri was placed on the 10-day injured list with a fractured tibia. In 12 appearances for New York, he went 5-for-18 (.278) with one RBI and one stolen base. Azócar was designated for assignment by the Mets on May 24. He cleared waivers and elected free agency on May 28.

=== Atlanta Braves ===
On May 29, 2025, Azocar signed a minor league contract with the Atlanta Braves. The following day, Azócar's contract was selected by Atlanta, and he was added to the team's active roster. He played in two games for the Braves, flying out on his only at-bat. Azócar was designated for assignment by Atlanta on June 16. He elected free agency after clearing waivers on June 18.

=== New York Mets (second stint) ===
On June 27, 2025, Azócar signed a minor league contract with the New York Mets. He made 71 total appearances for the Triple-A Syracuse Mets, slashing .241/.314/.352 with four home runs, 28 RBI, and 17 stolen bases. Azócar elected free agency following the season on November 6.

=== Atlanta Braves (second stint) ===
On December 30, 2025, Azócar signed a minor league contract with the Atlanta Braves. He began the 2026 season with the Triple-A Gwinnett Stripers, appearing in 27 games and slashing .270/.348/.420 with two home runs and 11 RBI. On May 3, 2026, the Braves selected Azócar's contract, adding him to their active roster. He appeared in two games, being held hitless and totaling one stolen base. On May 6, Azócar was designated for assignment by Atlanta. He elected free agency after clearing waivers two days later. On May 11, Azócar re-signed with Atlanta on a minor league contract; he was selected to the active roster the next day. In seven games with the Braves, he recorded five hits and posted a .385 batting average. On May 20, Azócar was designated for assignment by Atlanta. He elected free agency after clearing waivers two days later. On May 25, Azócar re-signed with Atlanta on a minor league contract. On July 6, he was selected to the Braves' active roster after Eli White was placed on the paternity list. After collecting one hit in two at-bats, Azócar was designated for assignment on July 9; he cleared waivers and elected free agency two days later. On July 13, he re-signed with the Braves on a new minor league contract. He elected free agency on November 2.
