= Eguy Rosario =

Dominican baseball player (born 1999)

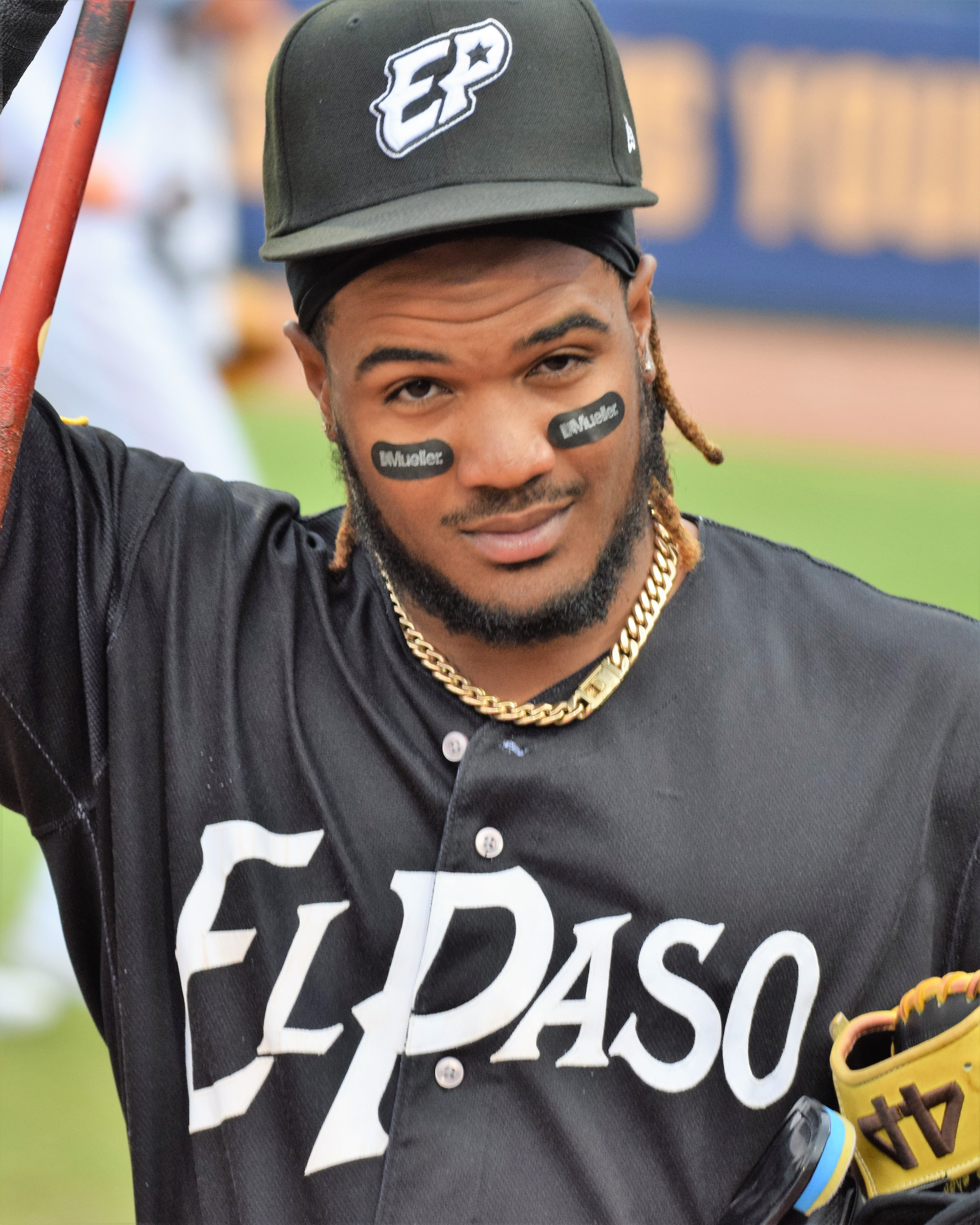
- Rosario in 2022 with the El Paso Chihuahuas

Algodoneros de Unión Laguna – No. 13
- Infielder
- Born: August 25, 1999 (age 27); Juan Baron, Dominican Republic
- Bats: Right Throws: Right

MLB debut
- August 26, 2022, for the San Diego Padres

MLB statistics (through 2024 season)
- Batting average: .245
- Home runs: 5
- Runs batted in: 12
- Stats at Baseball Reference

Teams
- San Diego Padres (2022–2024)

Eguy Rosario (born August 25, 1999) is a Dominican professional baseball infielder for the Algodoneros de Unión Laguna of the Mexican League. He has previously played in Major League Baseball (MLB) for the San Diego Padres.

== Career ==
=== San Diego Padres ===
Rosario signed with the San Diego Padres as an international free agent on August 25, 2015. He made his professional debut in 2016, spending the year with the Dominican Summer League Padres and rookie-level Arizona League Padres. Rosario split the 2017 season between the AZL Padres and Single-A Fort Wayne TinCaps. In 100 appearances for the two affiliates, he slashed a combined .246/.332/.355 with one home run, 46 RBI, and 33 stolen bases. Rosario spent 2018 with the High-A Lake Elsinore Storm and Double-A San Antonio Missions, playing in 124 total games and batting .237/.308/.359 with nine home runs, 47 RBI, and 10 stolen bases.

Rosario made 122 appearances for Lake Elsinore during the 2019 season, hitting .278/.331/.412 with seven home runs, 72 RBI, and 21 stolen bases. Rosario did not play in a game in 2020 due to the cancellation of the minor league season because of the COVID-19 pandemic. He returned to action in 2021 with Double-A San Antonio, making 114 appearances and batting .281/.360/.455 with 12 home runs, 61 RBI, and 30 stolen bases. After the 2021 season, Rosario played in the Arizona Fall League.

On November 19, 2021, the Padres added Rosario to their 40-man roster in order to protect him from the Rule 5 draft. He was assigned to the Triple-A El Paso Chihuahuas to begin the 2022 season. With the team, he hit .288/.368/.508 with 22 home runs, 81 RBI, and 21 stolen bases in 124 games. On August 26, 2022, Rosario was recalled and promoted to the major leagues for the first time. He made his MLB debut that day, and went 1-for-5 with a walk in 7 major league games with San Diego.

On February 3, 2023, it was announced that Rosario had suffered a broken ankle while doing sprinting drills during winter ball. The injury necessitated surgery and came with a recovery timetable of multiple months. Rosario started a rehabilitation assignment on June 7. On August 4, Rosario was activated from the injured list and optioned to Triple–A El Paso. In 11 total games for San Diego, he went 9-for-36 (.250) with two home runs and six RBI. Rosario made 30 appearances for the Padres during the 2024 campaign, batting .245/.286/.528 with three home runs and six RBI.

Rosario was designated for assignment by the Padres on March 27, 2025. He cleared waivers and was sent outright to Triple-A El Paso on April 3. Rosario made 60 appearances split between the rookie-level Arizona Complex League Padres, Fort Wayne, San Antonio, and El Paso, batting a cumulative .192/.266/.297 with five home runs, 24 RBI, and 10 stolen bases. He elected free agency following the season on November 6.

=== Algodoneros de Unión Laguna ===
On April 21, 2026, Rosario signed with the Algodoneros de Unión Laguna of the Mexican League.

== See also ==
- List of Major League Baseball players from the Dominican Republic
