= 2026 Toronto Blue Jays season =

Major League Baseball season

2026 Toronto Blue Jays
- League: American League
- Division: East
- Ballpark: Rogers Centre
- City: Toronto, Ontario
- Record: 79–83 (.488)
- Divisional place: 5th
- Owners: Rogers
- President: Mark Shapiro (also CEO)
- General manager: Ross Atkins
- Manager: John Schneider
- Television: Sportsnet; Sportsnet One
- Radio: Blue Jays Radio Network; Sportsnet 590 the FAN

The 2026 Toronto Blue Jays season was the 50th season of the Toronto Blue Jays franchise and the Blue Jays' 35th full season (37th overall) at Rogers Centre. They entered the season as the defending American League champions, the American League East champions, and runners-up of the World Series. The Blue Jays regressed from their 94–68 record from the previous season and were eliminated from playoff contention on September 23.

== Standings ==
=== Season standings ===
==== American League East ====
AL East
Team	W	L	Pct.	GB	Home	Road
Tampa Bay Rays	98	64	.605	—	55‍–‍26	43‍–‍38
New York Yankees	93	68	.578	4½	46‍–‍34	47‍–‍34
Boston Red Sox	87	75	.537	11	41‍–‍40	46‍–‍35
Baltimore Orioles	79	82	.491	18½	39‍–‍42	40‍–‍40
Toronto Blue Jays	79	83	.488	19	42‍–‍39	37‍–‍44

==== American League Wild Card ====
Division leaders
Team	W	L	Pct.
Tampa Bay Rays	98	64	.605
Cleveland Guardians	85	77	.525
Houston Astros	81	81	.500

Wild Card teams (Top 3 teams qualify for postseason)
Team	W	L	Pct.	GB
New York Yankees	93	68	.578	+9½
Boston Red Sox	87	75	.537	+3
Chicago White Sox	84	78	.519	—
Texas Rangers	80	82	.494	4
Baltimore Orioles	79	82	.491	4½
Toronto Blue Jays	79	83	.488	5
Minnesota Twins	77	85	.475	7
Detroit Tigers	76	86	.469	8
Seattle Mariners	76	86	.469	8
Kansas City Royals	69	93	.426	15
Athletics	64	98	.395	20
Los Angeles Angels	62	100	.383	22

== Record vs. opponents ==
	Record			Games Left		
Opponent	Home	Road	Total	Home	Road	Total
AL East
Baltimore Orioles	4–2	2–5	6–7	–	–	–
Boston Red Sox	5–2	4–2	9–4	–	–	–
New York Yankees	3–3	3–4	6–7	–	–	–
Tampa Bay Rays	2–5	2–4	4–9	–	–	–
Totals	14–12	11–15	25–27	–	–	–
AL Central
Chicago White Sox	1–2	0–3	1–5	–	–	–
Cleveland Guardians	2–1	2–1	4–2	–	–	–
Detroit Tigers	1–2	2–1	3–3	–	–	–
Kansas City Royals	1–2	2–1	3–3	–	–	–
Minnesota Twins	1–2	2–2	3–4	–	–	–
Totals	6–9	8–8	14–17	–	–	–
AL West
Houston Astros	1–2	2–1	3–3	–	–	–
Los Angeles Angels	2–1	2–1	4–2	–	–	–
Athletics	3–0	1–2	4–2	–	–	–
Seattle Mariners	3–0	1–2	4–2	–	–	–
Texas Rangers	0–4	1–2	1–6	–	–	–
Totals	9–7	7–8	16–15	–	–	–
National League
Arizona Diamondbacks	–	1–2	1–2	–	–	–
Atlanta Braves	–	1–2	1–2	–	–	–
Chicago Cubs	–	1–2	1–2	–	–	–
Cincinnati Reds	2–1	–	2–1	–	–	–
Colorado Rockies	1–2	–	1–2	–	–	–
Los Angeles Dodgers	1–2	–	1–2	–	–	–
Miami Marlins	2–1	–	2–1	–	–	–
Milwaukee Brewers	–	1–2	1–2	–	–	–
New York Mets	2–1	–	2–1	–	–	–
Philadelphia Phillies	1–2	2–1	3–3	–	–	–
Pittsburgh Pirates	2–1	–	2–1	–	–	–
San Diego Padres	–	1–2	1–2	–	–	–
San Francisco Giants	–	2–1	2–1	–	–	–
St. Louis Cardinals	2–1	–	2–1	–	–	–
Washington Nationals	–	2–1	2–1	–	–	–
Totals	13–11	11–13	24–24	–	–	–
Grand Totals	42–39	37–44	79–83	–	–	–

Month	Games	Won	Lost	Pct.
March	5	4	1	.800
April	26	10	16	.385
May	29	15	14	.517
June	26	11	15	.423
July	24	11	13	.458
August	28	17	11	.607
September	24	11	13	.458
Totals	162	79	83	.488

== Regular season ==
=== Opening Day lineup ===
Opening Day starters
Position	Name
Catcher	Alejandro Kirk
First baseman	Vladimir Guerrero Jr.
Second baseman	Ernie Clement
Shortstop	Andrés Giménez
Third baseman	Kazuma Okamoto
Left fielder	Nathan Lukes
Center fielder	Daulton Varsho
Right fielder	Addison Barger
Designated hitter	George Springer
Pitcher	Kevin Gausman

=== Season summary ===
==== March and April ====
On March 29, the Blue Jays finished the opening weekend series with 50 strikeouts against the Athletics, setting the MLB record for the most strikeouts in the first three games of a season in the modern era. The Blue Jays swept the series, beginning 2026 with a 3–0 record. Cody Ponce, the 2025 Choi Dong-won Award winner as the best starting pitcher in the KBO League, left his first start of the 2026 season with a knee injury as the Jays fell to the Colorado Rockies 14–5. The Blue Jays took the second game, 5–1, before dropping the third and final game 2–1 in extra innings. In the finale, Kevin Gausman became the first pitcher in MLB since at least 1900 to strike out 10 or more batters in his first two starts in the season without walking a batter.

==== May ====
On May 11, Gausman struck out Hunter Feduccia, his 2,000th career strikeout, in a game against the Tampa Bay Rays.

=== Game log ===
Legend
Blue Jays win	Blue Jays loss	Game postponed	Eliminated from playoff race

2026 Game Log: 79–83 (Home: 42–39; Away: 37–44)
March: 4–1 (Home: 4–1; Away: 0–0)

#	Date	Opponent	Score	Win	Loss	Save	Attendance	Record	GB
1	March 27	Athletics	3–2	Hoffman (1–0)	Sterner (0–1)	—	42,728	1–0	½
2	March 28	Athletics	8–7 (11)	Miles (1–0)	Medina (0–1)	—	40,268	2–0	½
3	March 29	Athletics	5–2	Lauer (1–0)	Morales (0–1)	Hoffman (1)	36,484	3–0	—
4	March 30	Rockies	5–14	Dollander (1–0)	Varland (0–1)	—	35,490	3–1	―
5	March 31	Rockies	5–1	Scherzer (1–0)	Mejía (0–1)	—	38,871	4–1	―

April: 10–16 (Home: 6–7; Away: 4–9)

#	Date	Opponent	Score	Win	Loss	Save	Attendance	Record	GB
6	April 1	Rockies	1–2 (10)	Bernardino (1–0)	Little (0–1)	Herget (1)	37,208	4–2	1
--	April 2	@ White Sox	Postponed (inclement weather) Rescheduled: Apr 3						
7	April 3	@ White Sox	4–5 (10)	Domínguez (1–1)	Hoffman (1–1)	—	33,171	4–3	2
8	April 4	@ White Sox	3–6	Murphy (1–0)	Little (0–2)	Domínguez (1)	18,389	4–4	3
9	April 5	@ White Sox	0–3	Martin (2–0)	Lauer (1–1)	Murphy (1)	22,326	4–5	3
10	April 6	Dodgers	2–14	Wrobleski (1–0)	Scherzer (1–1)	—	40,991	4–6	3½
11	April 7	Dodgers	1–4	Yamamoto (2–1)	Gausman (0–1)	Díaz (4)	40,971	4–7	4½
12	April 8	Dodgers	4–3	Rogers (1–0)	Casparius (0–1)	Hoffman (2)	37,766	5–7	3½
13	April 10	Twins	10–4	Mantiply (1–0)	Woods Richardson (0–2)	—	40,721	6–7	2
14	April 11	Twins	4–7	Ryan (2–1)	Lauer (1–2)	—	41,591	6–8	2
15	April 12	Twins	2–8	Bradley (3–0)	Scherzer (1–2)	—	37,804	6–9	2
16	April 14	@ Brewers	9–7 (10)	Varland (1–1)	Anderson (0–1)	—	25,143	7–9	2
17	April 15	@ Brewers	1–2	Ashby (4–0)	Rogers (1–1)	Uribe (1)	23,092	7–10	3
18	April 16	@ Brewers	1–2	Ashby (5–0)	Nance (0–1)	Zerpa (2)	23,098	7–11	4
19	April 17	@ Diamondbacks	3–6	Soroka (4–0)	Lauer (1–3)	Sewald (7)	32,747	7–12	4
20	April 18	@ Diamondbacks	2–6	Morillo (1–1)	Hoffman (1–2)	—	36,946	7–13	5
21	April 19	@ Diamondbacks	10–4	Gausman (1–1)	Nelson (1–2)	—	32,240	8–13	4½
22	April 20	@ Angels	5–2	Cease (1–0)	Detmers (1–2)	Hoffman (3)	37,897	9–13	4
23	April 21	@ Angels	4–2	Fluharty (1–0)	Pomeranz (0–2)	Varland (1)	28,641	10–13	4
24	April 22	@ Angels	3–7	Suter (1–1)	Nance (0–2)	—	25,306	10–14	5
25	April 24	Guardians	6–8	Williams (4–1)	Scherzer (1–3)	Smith (6)	41,671	10–15	6½
26	April 25	Guardians	5–3	Gausman (2–1)	Cantillo (1–1)	Varland (2)	41,543	11–15	6½
27	April 26	Guardians	4–2	Fisher (1–0)	Cecconi (0–4)	Varland (3)	41,136	12–15	5½
28	April 27	Red Sox	0–5	Suárez (2–2)	Cease (1–1)	—	41,785	12–16	6½
29	April 28	Red Sox	3–0	Yesavage (1–0)	Tolle (0–1)	Varland (4)	41,949	13–16	6½
30	April 29	Red Sox	8–1	Fisher (1–0)	Bello (1–4)	—	41,314	14–16	5½
31	April 30	@ Twins	1–7	Ober (3–1)	Gausman (2–2)	—	16,985	14–17	6

May: 15–14 (Home: 7–5; Away: 8–9)

#	Date	Opponent	Score	Win	Loss	Save	Attendance	Record	GB
32	May 1	@ Twins	7–3	Corbin (1–0)	Woods Richardson (0–5)	—	19,762	15–17	6
33	May 2	@ Twins	11–4	Cease (2–1)	García (0–1)	—	30,687	16–17	6
34	May 3	@ Twins	3–4	Morris (1–1)	Yesavage (1–1)	Topa (2)	20,394	16–18	7
35	May 4	@ Rays	1–5	Martinez (3–1)	Lauer (1–4)	Baker (9)	11,263	16–19	8
36	May 5	@ Rays	3–4	Legumina (1–1)	Rogers (1–2)	Sulser (2)	11,217	16–20	9
37	May 6	@ Rays	0–3	McClanahan (4–2)	Corbin (1–1)	Seymour (1)	11,275	16–21	9
38	May 8	Angels	2–0	Cease (3–1)	Detmers (1–3)	Varland (5)	41,923	17–21	8½
39	May 9	Angels	14–1	Fluharty (2–0)	Kochanowic (2–2)	—	41,461	18–21	7½
40	May 10	Angels	1–6	Soriano (6–2)	Lauer (1–5)	—	40,977	18–22	8½
41	May 11	Rays	5–8	Rasmussen (3–1)	Gausman (2–3)	Baker (11)	39,336	18–23	9½
42	May 12	Rays	6–7 (10)	Seymour (2–0)	Fisher (2–1)	Cleavinger (1)	41,265	18–24	10½
43	May 13	Rays	5–3 (10)	Hoffman (2–2)	Brooks (0–1)	—	40,119	19–24	9½
44	May 15	@ Tigers	2–3	Jansen (1–2)	Hoffman (2–3)	—	31,038	19–25	10½
45	May 16	@ Tigers	2–1 (10)	Varland (2–1)	Holton (0–2)	—	38,295	20–25	9½
46	May 17	@ Tigers	4–1	Gausman (3–3)	Flaherty (0–5)	Rogers (1)	37,486	21–25	9½
47	May 18	@ Yankees	6–7	Blackburn (2–1)	Rodríguez (0–1)	Bednar (11)	39,082	21–26	10½
48	May 19	@ Yankees	4–5	Warren (6–1)	Cease (3–2)	Doval (1)	37,181	21–27	11½
49	May 20	@ Yankees	2–1	Yesavage (2–1)	Schlittler (6–2)	Varland (6)	37,497	22–27	11½
50	May 21	@ Yankees	2–0	Macko (1–0)	Rodón (0–2)	Hoffman (4)	40,249	23–27	11
51	May 22	Pirates	6–2	Gausman (4–3)	Chandler (1–6)	Varland (7)	39,839	24–27	11
52	May 23	Pirates	5–2	Corbin (2–1)	Skenes (6–4)	Hoffman (5)	41,813	25–27	10½
53	May 24	Pirates	1–4	Keller (5–2)	Cease (3–3)	Soto (5)	41,354	25–28	10½
54	May 25	Marlins	2–8	Junk (3–5)	Yesavage (2–2)	—	41,177	25–29	10½
55	May 26	Marlins	8–1	Miles (2–0)	Alcántara (3–4)	—	42,815	26–29	9½
56	May 27	Marlins	2–1	Hoffman (3–3)	Nardi (3–3)	Rogers (2)	42,372	27–29	8½
57	May 28	@ Orioles	2–1	Hoffman (4–3)	Nunez (2–2)	Varland (8)	13,778	28–29	8
58	May 29	@ Orioles	6–5	Fluharty (3–0)	Canó (1–2)	Fisher (1)	25,494	29–29	8
59	May 30	@ Orioles	5–6	Suárez (2–0)	Hoffman (4–4)	—	32,645	29–30	8
60	May 31	@ Orioles	5–9	Bradish (3–6)	Miles (2–1)	—	34,476	29–31	9

June: 11–15 (Home: 6–12; Away: 5–3)

#	Date	Opponent	Score	Win	Loss	Save	Attendance	Record	GB
61	June 2	@ Braves	3–4	Elder (5–3)	Gausman (4–4)	Iglesias (11)	30,937	29–32	8½
62	June 3	@ Braves	3–7	Holmes (4–2)	Corbin (2–2)	—	37,178	29–33	8½
63	June 4	@ Braves	7–2	Dallas (1–0)	Sale (8–4)	Varland (9)	30,598	30–33	8
64	June 5	Orioles	3–13	Young (4–1)	Yesavage (2–3)	—	41,801	30–34	9
65	June 6	Orioles	6–4	Miles (3–1)	Bradish (3–7)	Varland (10)	41,868	31–34	8
66	June 7	Orioles	6–4	Macko (2–0)	Baz (3–6)	Varland (11)	41,278	32–34	7
67	June 8	Phillies	2–5	Sánchez (8–2)	Corbin (2–3)	Durán (16)	37,178	32–35	8
68	June 9	Phillies	3–2	Varland (3–1)	Durán (1–3)	—	41,079	33–35	8
69	June 10	Phillies	4–7	Luzardo (5–4)	Scherzer (1–4)	Durán (17)	35,733	33–36	9
70	June 12	Yankees	8–5	Yesavage (3–3)	Weathers (2–5)	Varland (12)	41,596	34–36	8
71	June 13	Yankees	1–3	Cruz (4–1)	Varland (3–2)	Bednar (14)	42,364	34–37	9
72	June 14	Yankees	3–8	Doval (3–0)	Fisher (2–2)	—	41,596	34–38	10
73	June 16	@ Red Sox	6–1	Cease (4–3)	Tolle (3–4)	Varland (13)	32,392	35–38	10
74	June 17	@ Red Sox	3–0	Woods Richardson (1–7)	Bennett (1–3)	Varland (14)	35,817	36–38	10
75	June 18	@ Red Sox	4–3	Nance (1–2)	Chapman (0–2)	Fluharty (1)	32,027	37–38	9
76	June 19	@ Cubs	2–16	Brown (4–2)	Gausman (4–5)	—	40,275	37–39	10
77	June 20	@ Cubs	8–6	Hoffman (5–4)	Webb (1–2)	Varland (15)	40,706	38–39	9
–	June 21	@ Cubs	Postponed (inclement weather) Makeup date: August 6						
78	June 22	Astros	4–2	Fisher (3–2)	De Los Santos (0–2)	Varland (16)	42,273	39–39	7½
79	June 23	Astros	7–9 (11)	VanWey (1–0)	Fisher (3–3)	—	38,633	39–40	8½
80	June 24	Astros	1–3	Okert (1–0)	Hoffman (5–5)	Hader (6)	39,264	39–41	9½
81	June 25	Rangers	5–6	Gore (5–6)	Gausman (4–6)	Latz (15)	35,273	39–42	9½
82	June 26	Rangers	4–5	Eovaldi (8–7)	Corbin (2–4)	Latz (16)	41,689	39–43	9½
83	June 27	Rangers	4–7	Gray (3–0)	Cease (4–4)	Alexander (3)	41,657	39–44	9½
84	June 28	Rangers	2–3	Winn (3–2)	Varland (3–3)	Alexander (4)	40,898	39–45	10½
85	June 29	Mets	2–1	Yesavage (4–3)	Manaea (1–3)	Varland (17)	41,634	40–45	10
86	June 30	Mets	0–3	McLean (5–5)	Gausman (4–7)	Williams (12)	41,538	40–46	11

July: 11–13 (Home: 4–5; Away: 7–8)

#	Date	Opponent	Score	Win	Loss	Save	Attendance	Record	GB
87	July 1	Mets	9–3	Miles (4–1)	Peralta (5–7)	Corbin (1)	41,842	41–46	11
88	July 3	@ Mariners	2–0	Cease (5–4)	Castillo (3–7)	Varland (18)	45,391	42–46	11½
89	July 4	@ Mariners	0–11	Gilbert (7–5)	Bieber (0–1)	—	41,181	42–47	11½
90	July 5	@ Mariners	0–4	Hancock (6–4)	Yesavage (4–4)	—	37,415	42–48	11½
91	July 6	@ Giants	1–10	Roupp (6–8)	Gausman (4–8)	—	32,740	42–49	11½
92	July 7	@ Giants	9–3	Corbin (3–4)	McDonald (3–7)	—	32,140	43–49	11½
93	July 8	@ Giants	10–0	Cease (6–4)	Webb (5–7)	—	34,023	44–49	11½
94	July 10	@ Padres	5–3	Fluharty (4–0)	Sears (2–2)	Varland (19)	41,886	45–49	11
95	July 11	@ Padres	7–8	Rodríguez (2–2)	Fluharty (4–1)	Miller (24)	40,561	45–50	12
96	July 12	@ Padres	4–5	Morejón (7–2)	Hoffman (5–6)	Miller (25)	41,675	45–51	12
96th All-Star Game in Philadelphia, Pennsylvania
97	July 17	White Sox	4–12	Schweitzer (1–0)	Miles (4–2)	—	41,895	45–52	11½
98	July 18	White Sox	1–0	Bieber (1–1)	Martin (9–5)	Varland (20)	41,775	46–52	10½
99	July 19	White Sox	0–3	Burke (7–4)	Yesavage (4–5)	Taylor (5)	41,288	46–53	10½
100	July 20	Rays	1–7	Martinez (9–2)	Cease (6–5)	—	40,837	46–54	11½
101	July 21	Rays	2–12	Rasmussen (8–5)	Gausman (4–9)	—	42,881	46–55	12½
102	July 22	Rays	2–4	Jax (6–7)	Hoffman (5–7)	Baker (26)	42,841	46–56	13½
103	July 23	Rays	3–1	Bieber (2–1)	Seymour (6–3)	Varland (21)	43,225	47–56	12½
104	July 24	@ Red Sox	4–6	Whitlock (6–1)	Van Eyk (0–1)	Chapman (24)	37,405	47–57	13½
105	July 25	@ Red Sox	6–0	Cease (7–5)	Gray (12–2)	—	36,902	48–57	13½
106	July 26	@ Red Sox	1–6	Weissert (3–2)	Gausman (4–10)	—	36,795	48–58	14½
107	July 27	@ Nationals	3–2	Fluharty (5–1)	Yean (0–1)	Varland (22)	17,618	49–58	14
108	July 28	@ Nationals	6–8	Cavalli (8–4)	Bieber (2–2)	Beeter (11)	20,775	49–59	14
109	July 29	@ Nationals	5–2	Yesavage (5–5)	Ribalta (0–2)	Varland (23)	20,044	50–59	14
110	July 31	Cardinals	3–1	Hoffman (6–7)	Strzelecki (0–1)	Varland (24)	41,506	51–59	13½

August: 17–11 (Home: 10–5; Away: 7–6)

#	Date	Opponent	Score	Win	Loss	Save	Attendance	Record	GB
111	August 1	Cardinals	5–1	Gausman (5–10)	Mathews (0–1)	—	41,819	52–59	13½
112	August 2	Cardinals	1–5	Soriano (4–3)	Varland (3–4)	—	41,321	52–60	13½
113	August 3	@ Astros	3–1	Bieber (3–2)	Javier (1–2)	Rogers (3)	22,789	53–60	13½
114	August 4	@ Astros	2–7	Wesneski (2–0)	Dallas (1–1)	—	30,450	53–61	14½
115	August 5	@ Astros	5–4 (10)	Varland (4–4)	Sousa (0–1)	Lee (1)	27,751	54–61	14½
116	August 6	@ Cubs	2–3 (11)	Thornton (5–4)	Little (0–3)	—	39,476	54–62	15
117	August 7	@ Phillies	5–4	Estrada (1–0)	Wheeler (10–3)	Rogers (4)	43,641	55–62	15
118	August 8	@ Phillies	7–5 (11)	Varland (5–4)	Shugart (2–1)	Estrada (1)	40,010	56–62	15
119	August 9	@ Phillies	6–7 (12)	Kilian (4–7)	Estrada (1–1)	—	40,398	56–63	16
120	August 10	Red Sox	2–1	Woods Richardson (2–7)	Gray (14–3)	Varland (25)	42,511	57–63	16
121	August 11	Red Sox	5–3	Lee (1–0)	Sandoval (1–1)	Miles (1)	42,419	58–63	16
122	August 12	Red Sox	6–4	Rogers (2–2)	Guerrero (1–2)	Varland (26)	42,888	59–63	16
123	August 13	Red Sox	0–7	Tolle (8–6)	Scherzer (1–5)	—	43,442	59–64	16½
124	August 14	Yankees	3–1	Bieber (4–2)	Cole (6–6)	Varland (27)	42,816	60–64	15½
125	August 15	Yankees	4–1	Miles (5–2)	Headrick (6–2)	Varland (28)	42,580	61–64	14½
126	August 16	Yankees	3–4 (10)	Bednar (6–3)	Fisher (3–4)	Hill (2)	42,351	61–65	14½
127	August 18	@ Rays	10–5	Soriano (10–6)	Martinez (12–4)	—	12,387	62–65	14
128	August 19	@ Rays	6–7	Rasmussen (13–5)	Scherzer (1–6)	Baker (36)	13,015	62–66	15
129	August 20	@ Rays	5–1	Bieber (5–2)	Seymour (9–4)	—	12,857	63–66	14
130	August 21	@ Yankees	1–3	Schlittler (11–6)	Arrighetti (7–6)	Bednar (30)	45,062	63–67	14
131	August 22	@ Yankees	4–3	Cease (8–5)	Weathers (5–8)	Varland (29)	46,231	64–67	13
132	August 23	@ Yankees	3–8	Blackburn (5–2)	Soriano (10–7)	—	41,802	64–68	14
133	August 25	Royals	3–5	Lugo (6–7)	Scherzer (1–7)	—	43,245	64–69	14½
134	August 26	Royals	3–0	Dallas (2–1)	Dobnak (2–2)	Varland (30)	42,323	65–69	14½
135	August 27	Royals	2–13	Cameron (9–8)	Arrighetti (7–7)	—	42,621	65–70	15
136	August 28	Mariners	8–1	Cease (9–5)	Hancock (7–8)	—	41,910	66–70	15
137	August 29	Mariners	4–3	Soriano (11–7)	Ferrer (4–3)	Varland (31)	41,512	67–70	15
138	August 30	Mariners	7–0	Scherzer (2–7)	Gilbert (11–8)	—	42,039	68–70	15

September: 11–13 (Home: 5–4; Away: 6–9)

#	Date	Opponent	Score	Win	Loss	Save	Attendance	Record	GB
139	September 1	@ Guardians	1–6	Williams (13–7)	Arrighetti (7–8)	—	18,099	68–71	15½
140	September 2	@ Guardians	11–0	Cease (10–5)	Cantillo (9–8)	—	17,248	69–71	14½
141	September 3	@ Guardians	6–3	Miles (6–2)	Bibee (5–15)	Varland (32)	18,186	70–71	14½
142	September 4	@ Royals	9–2	Mantiply (2–0)	Lynch IV (4–5)	Lorenzen (1)	18,218	71–71	13½
143	September 5	@ Royals	4–3	Fluharty (6–1)	Kimbrel (1–3)	Varland (33)	20,547	72–71	13½
144	September 6	@ Royals	1–6	Dobnak (3–3)	Arrighetti (7–9)	—	17,518	72–72	13½
145	September 7	@ Athletics	5–6	Harris (4–2)	Varland (5–5)	—	7,467	72–73	14
146	September 8	@ Athletics	4–2	Soriano (12–7)	Perkins (3–11)	Miles (2)	7,632	73–73	14
147	September 9	@ Athletics	0–2	Blewett (2–0)	Lorenzen (3–12)	Alvarado (6)	7,217	73–74	15
148	September 11	Orioles	4–7	Bassitt (7–5)	Scherzer (2–8)	Garcia (8)	42,111	73–75	15½
149	September 12	Orioles	7–3	Arrighetti (8–9)	Bradish (7–14)	—	41,949	74–75	15½
150	September 13	Orioles	8–1	Cease (11–5)	Rogers (10–10)	—	41,805	75–75	15½
151	September 14	Tigers	5–6	Kinley (7–5)	Varland (5–6)	Jansen (20)	42,867	75–76	16
152	September 15	Tigers	1–10	Anderson (5–6)	Lorenzen (3–13)	—	43,554	75–77	17
153	September 16	Tigers	5–1	Scherzer (3–8)	Montero (9–9)	Varland (34)	43,463	76–77	17
154	September 18	@ Rangers	1–7	Williams (2–0)	Cease (11–6)	—	31,045	76–78	17½
155	September 19	@ Rangers	2–6	Montgomery (1–0)	Soriano (12–8)	—	38,399	76–79	18½
156	September 20	@ Rangers	7–2	Arrighetti (9–9)	deGrom (11–10)	—	33,694	77–79	18½
157	September 21	@ Orioles	3–4	Canó (4–3)	Rogers (2–3)	Garcia (10)	12,067	77–80	19
―	September 22	@ Orioles	Postponed (inclement weather) Rescheduled: Sep 23						
158	September 23 (1)	@ Orioles	2–4	Bassitt (9–5)	Scherzer (3–9)	Kittredge (11)	10,562	77–81	19½
159	September 23 (2)	@ Orioles	2–4	Gibson (2–3)	Van Eyk (0–2)	—	19,824	77–82	19½
160	September 25	Reds	6–5	Fluharty (7–1)	Mey (0–2)	Varland (35)	42,535	78–82	19
161	September 26	Reds	1–5	Lowder (7–12)	Yesavage (5–6)	—	42,482	78–83	20
162	September 27	Reds	5–1	Scherzer (4–9)	Williamson (5–5)	—	42,131	79–83	19

== Roster ==
2026 Toronto Blue Jays
Roster
Pitchers: 43 Tanner Andrews; 45 Spencer Arrighetti; 57 Shane Bieber; 84 Dylan Cease; 70 Brendan Cellucci; 46 Patrick Corbin; 37 Chad Dallas; 60 Lázaro Estrada; 63 Braydon Fisher; 26 Josh Fleming; 68 Mason Fluharty; 34 Kevin Gausman; 23 Jeff Hoffman; 70 Hayden Juenger; 65 John Klein; 56 Eric Lauer; 52 Chase Lee; 54 Brendon Little; 55 Michael Lorenzen; 64 Adam Macko; 35 Joe Mantiply; 62 Spencer Miles; 45 Tommy Nance; 66 Cody Ponce; 64 José Rodríguez; 29 Yariel Rodríguez; 71 Tyler Rogers; 31 Max Scherzer; 40 Connor Seabold; 43 Paul Sewald; 40 José Soriano; 56 Jameson Taillon; 33 Ricky Tiedemann; 58 CJ Van Eyk; 77 Louis Varland; 50,58 Austin Voth; 64 Matt Waldron; 10 Simeon Woods Richardson; 39 Trey Yesavage	Catchers: 55 Tyler Heineman; 30 Alejandro Kirk; 59 Brandon Valenzuela; Infielders: 22 Ernie Clement; 0 Andrés Giménez; 27 Vladimir Guerrero Jr.; 20 Sean Keys; 26 Charles McAdoo; 7 Kazuma Okamoto; 50 Lenyn Sosa; 48 Luis Urías	Outfielders: 47 Addison Barger; 21 Brett Bateman; 23 Daz Cameron; 8 Jonatan Clase; 38 Nathan Lukes; 1 Rudy Martin Jr.; 24 Yohendrick Piñango; 12 Jesús Sánchez; 36 Davis Schneider; 9 Josh Smith; 4 George Springer; 3 Myles Straw; 5 Daulton Varsho; Other batters: 74 Eloy Jiménez	Manager: 14 John Schneider; Coaches: 61 Alex Andreopoulos (bullpen catcher); 81 Cody Atkinson (assistant hitting); 53 Mark Budzinski (first base/outfield); 51 Carlos Febles (third base/infield); 88 Sam Greene (assistant pitching); 15 DeMarlo Hale (associate manager); 78 Luis Hurtado (bullpen catcher); 80 Lou Iannotti (assistant hitting); 82 Graham Johnson (bullpen); -- John Lannan (mental performance coach); 79 David Popkins (hitting); 41 Pete Walker (pitching)

== Player stats ==
Note: Team leaders in each category are noted in bold.

=== Batting ===
Player	G	AB	R	H	2B	3B	HR	RBI	SB	BB	AVG	Ref.
Addison Barger	9	22	2	1	1	0	0	2	0	5	.045	
Brett Bateman	41	158	28	52	7	1	2	11	3	18	.329	
Daz Cameron	8	24	3	5	1	0	1	3	0	0	.208	
Jonatan Clase	9	22	4	6	0	0	2	6	0	3	.273	
Ernie Clement	**158**	**590**	60	**153**	**33**	1	9	48	7	22	.259	
Andrés Giménez	148	468	38	114	25	1	9	59	**20**	17	.244	
Vladimir Guerrero Jr.	144	542	72	141	25	0	9	57	7	56	**.260**	
Tyler Heineman	33	78	6	12	1	0	1	6	0	2	.154	
Eloy Jiménez	12	31	2	9	0	0	0	3	0	3	.290	
Sean Keys	25	61	9	12	2	0	2	9	0	3	.197	
Alejandro Kirk	79	277	26	77	8	0	10	43	1	33	.278	
Nathan Lukes	125	408	48	113	15	0	10	41	1	25	.277	
Rudy Martin Jr.	2	2	0	0	0	0	0	0	0	1	.000	
Charles McAdoo	36	97	12	25	4	0	3	14	2	7	.258	
Kazuma Okamoto	156	568	**81**	132	26	0	**33**	**92**	1	**59**	.232	
Yohendrick Piñango	58	169	12	44	8	0	5	20	0	11	.260	
Jesús Sánchez	99	269	24	70	18	0	8	35	1	17	.260	
Davis Schneider	69	124	21	18	6	0	5	16	1	29	.145	
Josh Smith	35	76	15	14	2	0	5	7	1	9	.184	
Lenyn Sosa	28	80	9	15	4	0	1	6	0	1	.188	
George Springer	126	462	59	115	23	**2**	15	54	12	47	.249	
Myles Straw	147	295	44	71	19	1	3	26	7	27	.241	
Luis Urías	26	52	5	13	3	0	3	8	0	6	.250	
Brandon Valenzuela	91	239	29	54	9	0	9	24	2	29	.226	
Daulton Varsho	99	333	39	81	19	**2**	7	26	9	29	.243	
**Totals**	**162**	**5447**	**648**	**1347**	**259**	**8**	**152**	**616**	**75**	**459**	**.247**	

=== Pitching ===
Player	G	GS	W	L	SV	ERA	WHIP	IP	H	R	ER	BB	K	Ref.
Tanner Andrews	2	0	0	0	0	0.00	1.00	3	1	0	0	2	1	
Spencer Arrighetti	7	2	2	4	0	6.35	1.54	22 2/3	21	20	16	14	19	
Shane Bieber	11	11	5	2	0	4.53	1.44	55 2/3	56	28	28	24	44	
Dylan Cease	29	**29**	**11**	6	0	**2.40**	**1.10**	**169**	108	54	45	**78**	**239**	
Brendan Cellucci	6	0	0	0	0	0.00	0.58	8 2/3	2	0	0	3	11	
Patrick Corbin	19	15	3	4	1	5.51	1.54	80	98	50	49	25	63	
Chad Dallas	6	0	2	1	0	5.02	1.47	14 1/3	13	8	8	8	17	
Lázaro Estrada	8	0	1	1	1	5.54	1.38	13	8	9	8	10	9	
Braydon Fisher	75	10	3	4	1	3.21	1.27	75 2/3	52	34	27	44	74	
Josh Fleming	1	0	0	0	0	12.00	2.67	3	6	4	4	2	1	
Mason Fluharty	**83**	4	7	1	1	3.30	1.24	62 2/3	50	23	23	28	65	
Kevin Gausman	23	23	5	**10**	0	4.38	1.29	127 1/3	**128**	**68**	**62**	36	127	
Tyler Heineman	3	0	0	0	0	13.50	2.40	3 1/3	7	5	5	1	0	
Jeff Hoffman	51	0	6	7	5	3.94	1.38	48	48	28	21	18	75	
Hayden Juenger	2	0	0	0	0	13.50	2.00	2	2	3	3	2	0	
John Klein	1	0	0	0	0	0.00	1.00	4	2	2	0	2	5	
Eric Lauer	8	6	1	5	0	6.69	1.49	36 1/3	38	27	27	16	26	
Chase Lee	8	0	1	0	1	6.52	1.66	9 2/3	8	8	7	8	5	
Brendon Little	30	0	0	3	0	6.35	1.91	28 1/3	29	23	20	25	44	
Michael Lorenzen	6	0	0	2	1	8.49	1.97	11 2/3	18	11	11	5	8	
Adam Macko	22	1	2	0	0	4.91	1.55	22	24	12	12	10	23	
Joe Mantiply	25	0	2	0	0	3.00	1.19	27	27	10	9	5	22	
Spencer Miles	49	8	6	2	2	2.63	1.10	95 2/3	80	31	28	25	93	
Tommy Nance	32	0	1	2	0	3.82	1.27	33	29	15	14	13	34	
Cody Ponce	1	1	0	0	0	3.86	0.86	2 1/3	1	1	1	1	3	
José Rodríguez	4	0	0	0	0	0.00	0.64	4 2/3	3	0	0	0	5	
Yariel Rodríguez	10	0	0	1	0	7.71	2.04	9 1/3	12	11	8	7	6	
Tyler Rogers	74	0	2	3	4	1.77	1.17	71	61	22	14	22	40	
Max Scherzer	18	18	4	9	0	5.74	1.33	84 2/3	78	54	54	35	68	
Connor Seabold	5	0	0	0	0	8.10	2.40	3 1/3	6	3	3	2	1	
Paul Sewald	17	0	0	0	0	0.63	0.70	14 1/3	6	1	1	4	9	
José Soriano	10	10	3	2	0	5.30	1.36	54 1/3	58	34	32	16	42	
Myles Straw	4	0	0	0	0	4.50	2.25	4	8	2	2	1	0	
Jameson Taillon	3	3	0	0	0	3.60	1.40	10	9	4	4	5	8	
Ricky Tiedemann	5	0	0	0	0	1.50	1.83	6	5	1	1	6	8	
CJ Van Eyk	5	1	0	2	0	5.40	1.46	11 2/3	15	8	7	2	3	
Louis Varland	71	0	5	6	**35**	1.27	1.00	78	55	20	11	23	97	
Austin Voth	2	0	0	0	0	9.00	2.17	6	8	6	6	5	1	
Matt Waldron	4	0	0	0	0	10.38	2.08	4 1/3	7	7	5	2	3	
Simeon Woods Richardson	8	0	2	0	0	3.93	1.42	18 1/3	14	8	8	12	14	
Trey Yesavage	20	20	5	6	0	3.69	1.14	97 2/3	64	41	40	47	97	
**Totals**	**162**	**162**	**79**	**83**	**52**	**3.89**	**1.29**	**1436**	**1264**	**694**	**621**	**594**	**1410**	

== Transactions ==
=== March ===
- On March 25, designated Angel Bastardo and Leo Jiménez for assignment, optioned Chase Lee to the Triple-A Buffalo Bisons, placed Anthony Santander on the 10-day injured list, and placed José Berríos, Shane Bieber, Yimi García, and Trey Yesavage on the 15-day injured list.
- On March 29, traded Leo Jiménez to the Miami Marlins in exchange for Dub Gleed and future considerations.
- On March 31, returned Angel Bastardo to the Boston Red Sox, placed Cody Ponce on the 15-day injured list, and recalled Lázaro Estrada.

=== April ===
- On April 3, signed Patrick Corbin and sent Trey Yesavage on a rehab assignment to the Low-A Dunedin Blue Jays.
- On April 4, placed Alejandro Kirk on the 10-day injured list and acquired Tyler Fitzgerald from the San Francisco Giants for cash considerations.
- On April 5, placed Lazaro Estrada on the 15-day injured list, transferred Cody Ponce and Anthony Santander to the 60-day injured list, optioned Brendon Little to the Triple-A Buffalo Bisons, and selected the contracts of Joe Mantiply and Austin Voth.
- On April 6, designated Austin Voth for assignment, and selected the contract of Josh Fleming.
- On April 7, designated Josh Fleming for assignment, and recalled Patrick Corbin and Tyler Fitzgerald.
- On April 9, outrighted Josh Fleming and Austin Voth.
- On April 12, placed George Springer on the 10-day injured list and selected the contract of Eloy Jiménez.
- On April 13, transferred Shane Bieber to the 60-day injured list and acquired Lenyn Sosa from the Chicago White Sox for Jordan Rich.
- On April 14, optioned Tyler Fitzgerald to the Triple-A Buffalo Bisons, and activated Lenyn Sosa.
- On April 15, sent Trey Yesavage on a rehab assignment to the Triple-A Buffalo Bisons.
- On April 16, sent José Berríos on a rehab assignment to the Low-A Dunedin Blue Jays.
- On April 24, designated Tyler Fitzgerald for assignment, and acquired Willie MacIver from the Texas Rangers for cash considerations and optioned him to the Triple-A Buffalo Bisons.
- On April 25, placed Nathan Lukes on the 10-day injured list, transferred Yimi García to the 60-day injured list, and selected the contract of Yohendrick Piñango.
- On April 27, placed Max Scherzer on the 15-day injured list and recalled Chase Lee.
- On April 28, traded Tyler Fitzgerald to the Los Angeles Dodgers for cash considerations, sent José Berríos on a rehab assignment to the Triple-A Buffalo Bisons, optioned Chase Lee, and activated Trey Yesavage.
- On April 29, designated Eloy Jiménez for assignment and activated George Springer.

=== May ===
- On May 2, outrighted Eloy Jiménez to the Triple-A Buffalo Bisons.
- On May 3, sent Addison Barger on a rehab assignment to the Low-A Dunedin Blue Jays.
- On May 7, sent Yimi García on a rehab assignment to the Rookie-level Florida Complex League Blue Jays.
- On May 9, optioned Yohendrick Piñango to the Triple-A Buffalo Bisons and activated Addison Barger.
- On May 11, designated Eric Lauer for assignment, placed Addison Barger on the 10-day injured list, recalled Yohendrick Piñango, and selected the contract of Yariel Rodríguez.
- On May 17, placed Tommy Nance on the 15-day injured list, traded Eric Lauer to the Los Angeles Dodgers for cash considerations, and recalled Adam Macko.
- On May 19, sent Nathan Lukes on a rehab assignment to the Low-A Dunedin Blue Jays placed Joe Mantiply on the 15-day injured list, and recalled Chase Lee.
- On May 25, placed Dylan Cease on the 15-day injured list, optioned Davis Schneider to the Triple-A Buffalo Bisons, sent Shane Bieber on a rehab assignment to the Rookie-level Florida Complex League Blue Jays, activated Nathan Lukes, and selected the contract of Tanner Andrews.
- On May 27, transferred José Berríos and Alejandro Kirk to the 60-day injured list, optioned Tanner Andrews to the Triple-A Buffalo Bisons, acquired Connor Seabold from the Detroit Tigers for Juanmi Vasquez, and selected the contract of Austin Voth.
- On May 28, placed Lenyn Sosa on the 10-day injured list, transferred Lázaro Estrada to the 60-day injured list, optioned Chase Lee to the Triple-A Buffalo Bisons, activated Connor Seabold, and selected the contract of Charles McAdoo.
- On May 30, designated Austin Voth for assignment and selected the contract of Hayden Juenger.
- On May 31, sent Shane Bieber on a rehab assignment to the Low-A Dunedin Blue Jays, and sent Max Scherzer on a rehab assignment to the Triple-A Buffalo Bisons.

=== June ===
- On June 2, sent Lázaro Estrada on a rehab assignment to the Triple-A Buffalo Bisons.
- On June 3, sent Yimi García and Alejandro Kirk on rehab assignments to the Low-A Dunedin Blue Jays, transferred Joe Mantiply to the 60-day injured list, and acquired Simeon Woods Richardson from the Minnesota Twins for cash considerations.
- On June 4, designated Tanner Andrews for assignment, sent Dylan Cease on a rehab assignment to the Triple-A Buffalo Bisons, optioned Hayden Juenger to the Triple-A Buffalo Bisons, and selected the contract of Chad Dallas.
- On June 5, optioned Chad Dallas to the Triple-A Buffalo Bisons, activated Simeon Woods Richardson, and sent Tommy Nance on a rehab assignment to the Triple-A Buffalo Bisons.
- On June 6, sent Shane Bieber on a rehab assignment to the Triple-A Buffalo Bisons.
- On June 7, outrighted Tanner Andrews to the Triple-A Buffalo Bisons.
- On June 8, designated Yariel Rodríguez for assignment and activated Tommy Nance.
- On June 9, optioned Adam Macko to the Triple-A Buffalo Bisons, activated Dylan Cease, and sent Alejandro Kirk on a rehab assignment to the Triple-A Buffalo Bisons.
- On June 10, designated Connor Seabold for assignment and activated Max Scherzer.
- On June 12, designated Tyler Heineman for assignment, outrighted Yariel Rodríguez to the Triple-A Buffalo Bisons, placed Daulton Varsho on the 10-day injured list, activated Alejandro Kirk, and recalled Davis Schneider.
- On June 15, traded Connor Seabold to the Kansas City Royals for Denis Samudio.
- On June 17, placed Max Scherzer on the 15-day injured list, recalled Chad Dallas, and traded Tyler Heineman to the Los Angeles Angels for cash considerations.
- On June 19, optioned Chad Dallas to the Triple-A Buffalo Bisons and recalled Brendon Little.
- On June 20, optioned Brendon Little and Charles McAdoo to the Triple-A Buffalo Bisons, activated Lázaro Estrada and Daulton Varsho, and acquired Luis Urías from the Arizona Diamondbacks for cash considerations.
- On June 22, sent Lenyn Sosa on a rehab assignment to the Florida Complex League Blue Jays, optioned Yohendrick Piñango to the Triple-A Buffalo Bisons, and activated Luis Urías.
- On June 23, activated Shane Bieber from the 60-day injured list, optioned Lázaro Estrada to the Triple-A Buffalo Bisons, and designated Hayden Juenger for assignment.
- On June 26, recalled Adam Macko from the Triple-A Buffalo Bisons and designated Simeon Woods Richardson for assignment.
- On June 27, selected the contract of Sean Keys from the Triple-A Buffalo Bisons, recalled Yohendrick Piñango from the Triple-A Buffalo Bisons, optioned Davis Schneider to the Triple-A Buffalo Bisons, traded Hayden Juenger to the Athletics for Owen Carapellotti, and placed Jesús Sánchez on the 10-day injured list.

== Farm system ==
Level	Team	League	Manager	Win–loss record	Division	Postseason	Ref.
Triple-A	Buffalo Bisons	International League	Casey Candaele	35–40 (first half); 33–39 (second half)	East Division	Did not qualify	
Double-A	New Hampshire Fisher Cats	Eastern League	John Tamargo	34–33 (first half); 25–42 (second half)	Northeast Division	Did not qualify	
High-A	Vancouver Canadians	Northwest League	José Mayorga	27–39 (first half); 37–29 (second half)	—N/a	Qualified won F 3–0	
Low-A	Dunedin Blue Jays	Florida State League	Ryan Casteel	30–35 (first half); 32–31 (second half)	West Division	Did not qualify	
Rookie	FCL Blue Jays	Florida Complex League	Danny Canellas	38–20	North Division	Qualified Lost single-elimination semifinal 4–2	
Rookie	DSL Blue Jays Red	Dominican Summer League	Deiferson Barreto	34–18	South Division	Qualified Lost round-robin group play 2–1	
Rookie	DSL Blue Jays Blue	Dominican Summer League	Ashley Ponce	20–35	Southwest Division	Did not qualify	
