= 2027 Toronto Blue Jays season =

Major League Baseball season

2027 Toronto Blue Jays
- League: American League
- Division: East
- Ballpark: Rogers Centre
- City: Toronto, Ontario
- Owners: Rogers
- President: Mark Shapiro (also CEO)
- General manager: Ross Atkins
- Manager: John Schneider
- Television: Sportsnet; Sportsnet One
- Radio: Blue Jays Radio Network; Sportsnet 590 the FAN

The 2027 Toronto Blue Jays season is scheduled to be the 51st season of the Toronto Blue Jays franchise, and the Blue Jays' 36th full season (38th overall) at Rogers Centre.

The season is contingent on Major League Baseball (MLB) and the Major League Baseball Players Association (MLBPA) signing a new collective bargaining agreement (CBA). Without a new CBA, MLB is expected to lock out the players on December 2, 2026, until one is signed. If such a lockout extends indefinitely, the season could be postponed, shortened, or even cancelled.

== Game log ==
The 2027 schedule is tentative until a new collective bargaining agreement (CBA) is signed between Major League Baseball (MLB) and the Major League Baseball Players Association (MLBPA). If the labor dispute extends into late February or early March, MLB would then start to consider whether to postpone or shorten the season.

Legend
Blue Jays win	Blue Jays loss	Game postponed

2027 Game Log: 0–0 (Home: 0–0; Away: 0–0)
March: 0–0 (Home: 0–0; Away: 0–0)

#	Date	Opponent	Score	Win	Loss	Save	Attendance	Record	GB
1	March 25	@ Yankees	—	—	—	—	—	–	—
2	March 27	@ Yankees	—	—	—	—	—	–	—
3	March 28	@ Yankees	—	—	—	—	—	–	—
4	March 29	@ Orioles	—	—	—	—	—	–	—
5	March 31	@ Orioles	—	—	—	—	—	–	—

April: 0–0 (Home: 0–0; Away: 0–0)

#	Date	Opponent	Score	Win	Loss	Save	Attendance	Record	GB
6	April 1	@ Orioles	—	—	—	—	—	–	—
7	April 2	Mariners	—	—	—	—	—	–	—
8	April 3	Mariners	—	—	—	—	—	–	—
9	April 4	Mariners	—	—	—	—	—	–	—
10	April 5	Brewers	—	—	—	—	—	–	—
11	April 6	Brewers	—	—	—	—	—	–	—
12	April 7	Brewers	—	—	—	—	—	–	—
13	April 9	@ Rays	—	—	—	—	—	–	—
14	April 10	@ Rays	—	—	—	—	—	–	—
15	April 11	@ Rays	—	—	—	—	—	–	—
16	April 13	@ Astros	—	—	—	—	—	–	—
17	April 14	@ Astros	—	—	—	—	—	–	—
18	April 15	@ Astros	—	—	—	—	—	–	—
19	April 16	Athletics	—	—	—	—	—	–	—
20	April 17	Athletics	—	—	—	—	—	–	—
21	April 18	Athletics	—	—	—	—	—	–	—
22	April 20	Guardians	—	—	—	—	—	–	—
23	April 21	Guardians	—	—	—	—	—	–	—
24	April 22	Guardians	—	—	—	—	—	–	—
25	April 23	@ Cardinals	—	—	—	—	—	–	—
26	April 24	@ Cardinals	—	—	—	—	—	–	—
27	April 25	@ Cardinals	—	—	—	—	—	–	—
28	April 26	@ Mets	—	—	—	—	—	–	—
29	April 27	@ Mets	—	—	—	—	—	–	—
30	April 28	@ Mets	—	—	—	—	—	–	—
31	April 30	Rays	—	—	—	—	—	–	—

May: 0–0 (Home: 0–0; Away: 0–0)

#	Date	Opponent	Score	Win	Loss	Save	Attendance	Record	GB
32	May 1	Rays	—	—	—	—	—	–	—
33	May 2	Rays	—	—	—	—	—	–	—
34	May 3	@ Red Sox	—	—	—	—	—	–	—
35	May 4	@ Red Sox	—	—	—	—	—	–	—
36	May 5	@ Red Sox	—	—	—	—	—	–	—
37	May 7	@ Royals	—	—	—	—	—	–	—
38	May 8	@ Royals	—	—	—	—	—	–	—
39	May 9	@ Royals	—	—	—	—	—	–	—
40	May 10	Red Sox	—	—	—	—	—	–	—
41	May 11	Red Sox	—	—	—	—	—	–	—
42	May 12	Red Sox	—	—	—	—	—	–	—
43	May 13	Red Sox	—	—	—	—	—	–	—
44	May 14	Orioles	—	—	—	—	—	–	—
45	May 15	Orioles	—	—	—	—	—	–	—
46	May 16	Orioles	—	—	—	—	—	–	—
47	May 17	Orioles	—	—	—	—	—	–	—
48	May 18	@ Rangers	—	—	—	—	—	–	—
49	May 19	@ Rangers	—	—	—	—	—	–	—
50	May 20	@ Rangers	—	—	—	—	—	–	—
51	May 21	@ Reds	—	—	—	—	—	–	—
52	May 22	@ Reds	—	—	—	—	—	–	—
53	May 23	@ Reds	—	—	—	—	—	–	—
54	May 25	Yankees	—	—	—	—	—	–	—
55	May 26	Yankees	—	—	—	—	—	–	—
56	May 27	Yankees	—	—	—	—	—	–	—
57	May 28	Twins	—	—	—	—	—	–	—
58	May 29	Twins	—	—	—	—	—	–	—
59	May 30	Twins	—	—	—	—	—	–	—
60	May 31	@ Phillies	—	—	—	—	—	–	—

June: 0–0 (Home: 0–0; Away: 0–0)

#	Date	Opponent	Score	Win	Loss	Save	Attendance	Record	GB
61	June 1	@ Phillies	—	—	—	—	—	–	—
62	June 2	@ Phillies	—	—	—	—	—	–	—
63	June 4	@ Pirates	—	—	—	—	—	–	—
64	June 5	@ Pirates	—	—	—	—	—	–	—
65	June 6	@ Pirates	—	—	—	—	—	–	—
66	June 8	Diamondbacks	—	—	—	—	—	–	—
67	June 9	Diamondbacks	—	—	—	—	—	–	—
68	June 10	Diamondbacks	—	—	—	—	—	–	—
69	June 11	Phillies	—	—	—	—	—	–	—
70	June 12	Phillies	—	—	—	—	—	–	—
71	June 13	Phillies	—	—	—	—	—	–	—
72	June 14	@ Marlins	—	—	—	—	—	–	—
73	June 15	@ Marlins	—	—	—	—	—	–	—
74	June 16	@ Marlins	—	—	—	—	—	–	—
75	June 18	@ Tigers	—	—	—	—	—	–	—
76	June 19	@ Tigers	—	—	—	—	—	–	—
77	June 20	@ Tigers	—	—	—	—	—	–	—
78	June 21	Giants	—	—	—	—	—	–	—
79	June 22	Giants	—	—	—	—	—	–	—
80	June 23	Giants	—	—	—	—	—	–	—
81	June 25	Padres	—	—	—	—	—	–	—
82	June 26	Padres	—	—	—	—	—	–	—
83	June 27	Padres	—	—	—	—	—	–	—
84	June 29	Angels	—	—	—	—	—	–	—
85	June 30	Angels	—	—	—	—	—	–	—

July: 0–0 (Home: 0–0; Away: 0–0)

#	Date	Opponent	Score	Win	Loss	Save	Attendance	Record	GB
86	July 1	Angels	—	—	—	—	—	–	—
87	July 2	@ Rockies	—	—	—	—	—	–	—
88	July 3	@ Rockies	—	—	—	—	—	–	—
89	July 4	@ Rockies	—	—	—	—	—	–	—
90	July 5	@ Athletics	—	—	—	—	—	–	—
91	July 6	@ Athletics	—	—	—	—	—	–	—
92	July 7	@ Athletics	—	—	—	—	—	–	—
93	July 8	@ Athletics	—	—	—	—	—	–	—
94	July 9	@ Angels	—	—	—	—	—	–	—
95	July 10	@ Angels	—	—	—	—	—	–	—
96	July 11	@ Angels	—	—	—	—	—	–	—
97th All-Star Game in Chicago, Illinois
97	July 16	Tigers	—	—	—	—	—	–	—
98	July 17	Tigers	—	—	—	—	—	–	—
99	July 18	Tigers	—	—	—	—	—	–	—
100	July 19	White Sox	—	—	—	—	—	–	—
101	July 20	White Sox	—	—	—	—	—	–	—
102	July 21	White Sox	—	—	—	—	—	–	—
103	July 22	White Sox	—	—	—	—	—	–	—
104	July 23	Rangers	—	—	—	—	—	–	—
105	July 24	Rangers	—	—	—	—	—	–	—
106	July 25	Rangers	—	—	—	—	—	–	—
107	July 26	@ Twins	—	—	—	—	—	–	—
108	July 27	@ Twins	—	—	—	—	—	–	—
109	July 28	@ Twins	—	—	—	—	—	–	—
110	July 30	@ Yankees	—	—	—	—	—	–	—
111	July 31	@ Yankees	—	—	—	—	—	–	—

August: 0–0 (Home: 0–0; Away: 0–0)

#	Date	Opponent	Score	Win	Loss	Save	Attendance	Record	GB
112	August 1	@ Yankees	—	—	—	—	—	–	—
113	August 2	@ Yankees	—	—	—	—	—	–	—
114	August 3	@ Orioles	—	—	—	—	—	–	—
115	August 4	@ Orioles	—	—	—	—	—	–	—
116	August 5	@ Orioles	—	—	—	—	—	–	—
117	August 6	Braves	—	—	—	—	—	–	—
118	August 7	Braves	—	—	—	—	—	–	—
119	August 8	Braves	—	—	—	—	—	–	—
120	August 10	Nationals	—	—	—	—	—	–	—
121	August 11	Nationals	—	—	—	—	—	–	—
122	August 12	Nationals	—	—	—	—	—	–	—
123	August 13	@ Guardians	—	—	—	—	—	–	—
124	August 14	@ Guardians	—	—	—	—	—	–	—
125	August 15	@ Guardians	—	—	—	—	—	–	—
126	August 16	@ Red Sox	—	—	—	—	—	–	—
127	August 17	@ Red Sox	—	—	—	—	—	–	—
128	August 18	@ Red Sox	—	—	—	—	—	–	—
129	August 19	Cubs*	—	—	—	—	—	–	—
130	August 21	Cubs	—	—	—	—	—	–	—
131	August 22	Cubs	—	—	—	—	—	–	—
132	August 24	Royals	—	—	—	—	—	–	—
133	August 25	Royals	—	—	—	—	—	–	—
134	August 26	Royals	—	—	—	—	—	–	—
135	August 27	Orioles	—	—	—	—	—	–	—
136	August 28	Orioles	—	—	—	—	—	–	—
137	August 29	Orioles	—	—	—	—	—	–	—
138	August 30	@ Rays	—	—	—	—	—	–	—
139	August 31	@ Rays	—	—	—	—	—	–	—
*August 19 game played at Bowman Field in Williamsport, Pennsylvania

September: 0–0 (Home: 0–0; Away: 0–0)

#	Date	Opponent	Score	Win	Loss	Save	Attendance	Record	GB
140	September 1	@ Rays	—	—	—	—	—	–	—
141	September 2	@ Rays	—	—	—	—	—	–	—
142	September 3	@ White Sox	—	—	—	—	—	–	—
143	September 4	@ White Sox	—	—	—	—	—	–	—
144	September 5	@ White Sox	—	—	—	—	—	–	—
145	September 6	Red Sox	—	—	—	—	—	–	—
146	September 7	Red Sox	—	—	—	—	—	–	—
147	September 8	Red Sox	—	—	—	—	—	–	—
148	September 10	Astros	—	—	—	—	—	–	—
149	September 11	Astros	—	—	—	—	—	–	—
150	September 12	Astros	—	—	—	—	—	–	—
151	September 13	@ Dodgers	—	—	—	—	—	–	—
152	September 14	@ Dodgers	—	—	—	—	—	–	—
153	September 15	@ Dodgers	—	—	—	—	—	–	—
154	September 17	@ Mariners	—	—	—	—	—	–	—
155	September 18	@ Mariners	—	—	—	—	—	–	—
156	September 19	@ Mariners	—	—	—	—	—	–	—
157	September 21	Yankees	—	—	—	—	—	–	—
158	September 22	Yankees	—	—	—	—	—	–	—
159	September 23	Yankees	—	—	—	—	—	–	—
160	September 24	Rays	—	—	—	—	—	–	—
161	September 25	Rays	—	—	—	—	—	–	—
162	September 26	Rays	—	—	—	—	—	–	—

== Roster ==
Toronto Blue Jays 2027 spring training roster
40-man roster		Non-roster invitees	Coaches / other
Pitchers: 45 Spencer Arrighetti; 17 José Berríos; 28 Jake Bloss; 84 Dylan Cease; 70 Brendan Cellucci; 37 Chad Dallas; 63 Braydon Fisher; 68 Mason Fluharty; 44 Bowden Francis; -- Daniel Guerra; 65 John Klein; 54 Brendon Little; 62 Spencer Miles; -- Nolan Perry; 66 Cody Ponce; 64 José Rodríguez; 71 Tyler Rogers; 40 José Soriano; 33 Ricky Tiedemann; 77 Louis Varland; 39 Trey Yesavage	Catchers: 30 Alejandro Kirk; -- Shawn Ross; 59 Brandon Valenzuela; Infielders: -- Christian Cairo; 22 Ernie Clement; 0 Andrés Giménez; 27 Vladimir Guerrero Jr.; 26 Charles McAdoo; 7 Kazuma Okamoto; 9 Josh Smith; Outfielders: 47 Addison Barger; 21 Brett Bateman; 8 Jonatan Clase; 38 Nathan Lukes; 24 Yohendrick Piñango; 25 Anthony Santander; -- RJ Schreck; Designated hitters: 20 Sean Keys	Pitchers: -- Lazaro Estrada; -- Josh Stephan; Outfielders: -- Victor Arias; -- Rudy Martin Jr.	Manager: 14 John Schneider; Coaches: 61 Alex Andreopoulos (bullpen catcher); 81 Cody Atkinson (assistant hitting); 53 Mark Budzinski (first base/outfield); 51 Carlos Febles (third base/infield); 88 Sam Greene (assistant pitching); 15 DeMarlo Hale (associate manager); 78 Luis Hurtado (bullpen catcher); 80 Lou Iannotti (assistant hitting); 82 Graham Johnson (bullpen); -- John Lannan (mental performance coach); 79 David Popkins (hitting); 41 Pete Walker (pitching); Vacant (bench); 39 active, 0 inactive, 4 non-roster invitees; 7-, 10-, or 15-day injured list; * Not on active roster; ^{†} Suspended list; Roster, coaches, and NRIs updated November 20, 2026; Transactions • Depth chart; → All MLB rosters

== Farm system ==
Level	Team	League	Manager	Win–loss record	Division	Postseason	Ref.
Triple-A	Buffalo Bisons	International League			East Division		
Double-A	New Hampshire Fisher Cats	Eastern League			Northeast Division		
High-A	Vancouver Canadians	Northwest League					
Low-A	Dunedin Blue Jays	Florida State League			West Division		
Rookie	FCL Blue Jays	Florida Complex League			North Division		
Rookie	DSL Blue Jays	Dominican Summer League			Baseball City		
