= Ross Atkins (baseball) =

American baseball executive (born 1973)

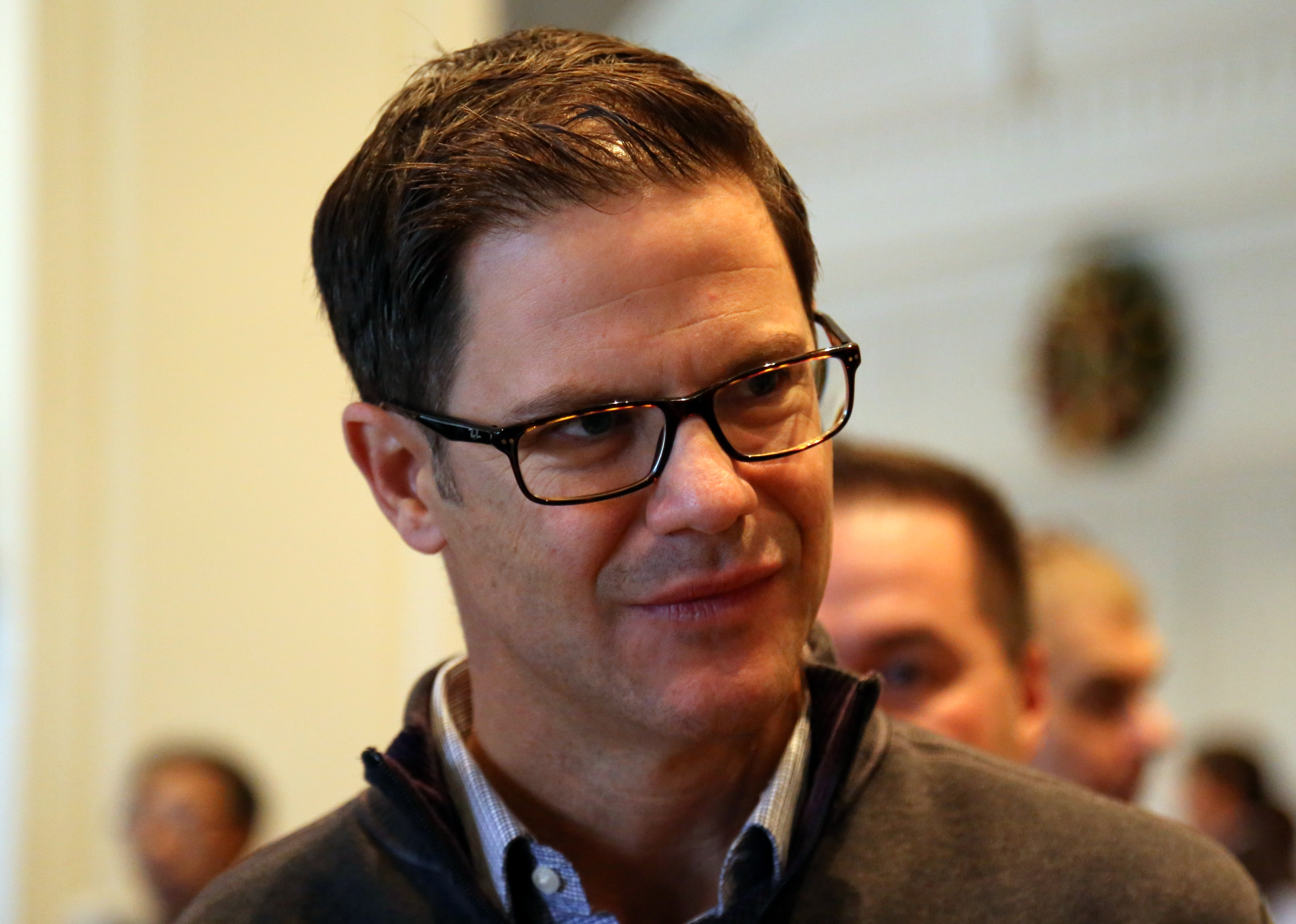
- Atkins in 2015

Toronto Blue Jays
- General Manager
- Born: August 7, 1973 (age 53); Greensboro, North Carolina, U.S.
- Stats at Baseball Reference

Teams
- Toronto Blue Jays (2015-present)

Dannon Ross Atkins (born August 7, 1973) is an American baseball executive. On December 3, 2015, he was named the general manager of the Toronto Blue Jays, the sixth in Toronto franchise history after having worked for the Cleveland Indians for 15 years.

== Playing career ==
Atkins was a pitcher at Coral Gables Senior High School in Coral Gables, Florida, a city adjacent to Miami. After graduating in 1991, Atkins was a pitcher at Wake Forest University, and was drafted by the Florida Marlins in the 69th round of the 1994 Major League Baseball draft, but did not sign. In 1993, he played collegiate summer baseball with the Yarmouth–Dennis Red Sox of the Cape Cod Baseball League. In the 1995 Major League Baseball draft, the Cleveland Indians selected him in the 38th round, and he signed with the team. He played 5 seasons in Cleveland's minor league organization before retiring, compiling a career 37–32 win–loss record, 4.13 earned run average (ERA), and 340 strikeouts in 512 innings pitched.

== Executive career ==
=== Cleveland Indians ===
The Indians hired Atkins in 2001 as assistant director of player development, and was promoted to director of Latin American operations in 2003. In 2006, they promoted him to director of player development. The Indians promoted Atkins to vice president of player personnel after the 2014 season.

=== Toronto Blue Jays ===
Mark Shapiro, who was hired as the Blue Jays' team president and CEO on October 31, 2015, hired Atkins as general manager on December 3. He replaced Tony LaCava, who served as interim GM in November. During the offseason leading into the 2016 season, Atkins made several moves, including selecting Joe Biagini in the Rule 5 draft, trading Ben Revere to the Washington Nationals for Drew Storen, and signing several players to minor league contracts with invitations to spring training. In his first draft as GM, Atkins selected T. J. Zeuch in the first round. Atkins made several additions to the Blue Jays roster prior to the trade deadline, acquiring Melvin Upton Jr., Joaquín Benoit, Scott Feldman, Francisco Liriano, and others, which aided the Blue Jays in making the postseason for the second consecutive season with an 89-73 record.

Atkins' second season was a disappointing one for the Jays. They finished 76-86 despite early season hopes of a third consecutive playoff berth. The 2018 season saw more of the same, as the Jays stumbled to a 73-89 record, leading to Atkins beginning a rebuild of the roster. On October 25, Atkins hired Charlie Montoyo as the franchise's 13th manager. Following a rebuilding 2019 season that saw them finish with a record of 67-95, the Blue Jays made the expanded playoffs during the shortened COVID-19 season in 2020 with a record of 32-28 that featured a core of young players such as Vladimir Guerrero Jr. and Bo Bichette. They were however swept 2-0 by the Tampa Bay Rays.

On April 7, 2021, the Blue Jays organization announced they had signed Atkins to a five-year contract extension, through the end of the 2026 season. In 2022, the Blue Jays finished with a record of 92-70 and made the playoffs but were eliminated in the wild-card round by the Seattle Mariners. Mid-way through the season, Montoyo was fired as manager and replaced by John Schneider. In the off-season, Atkins made a series of moves, including signing Brandon Belt, Kevin Kiermaier and notably trading catching prospect Gabriel Moreno and Lourdes Gurriel Jr. to the Arizona Diamondbacks for Daulton Varsho. The team ended the 2023 season with a record of 89-73 and suffered a second straight wild-card round sweep, this time at the hands of the Minnesota Twins. During the off-season, prized free agent Shohei Ohtani reportedly met with the Blue Jays at their Spring Training complex as one of the final teams he considered choosing; ultimately he signed a record 10-year 700 million dollar deal with the Los Angeles Dodgers. The primary additions ended up being the signing of Isiah Kiner-Falefa and re-signing of Kiermaier.

In the midst of a disappointing 2024 campaign, Atkins traded away a number of players on the roster before the July 30 trade deadline, including Kiner-Falefa, Kiermaier, Yimi García, Nate Pearson, Danny Jansen, Justin Turner, Yusei Kikuchi and Trevor Richards. 14 new players were brought in, primarily prospects from other organizations.

In 2025, the Blue Jays went from worst to first, going 94-68 and winning the AL East. Major trade deadline acquisitions included Shane Bieber and Seranthony Dominguez while rookie call-up Trey Yesavage shined in the playoffs. The Blue Jays defeated the New York Yankees in four games in the American League Division Series, and the Seattle Mariners in seven games in the American League Championship Series to win the AL pennant, their first since 1993. They ultimately fell to the Los Angeles Dodgers in the World Series in seven games.

Atkins signed Dylan Cease, Cody Ponce, Tyler Rogers and Kazuma Okamoto and traded outfielder Joey Loperfido to the Houston Astros for Jesús Sánchez (outfielder) in the offseason. On March 23, 2026, the Blue Jays announced that Atkins had agreed to a contract extension that runs through the 2031 season. In 2026, the Blue Jays went back to last place in the AL East, finishing with a record of 79-83.

Preceded by Tony LaCava	Toronto Blue Jays general manager 2015–present	Succeeded by incumbent
