= Chad Dallas =

American baseball player (born 2000)

Toronto Blue Jays – No. 37
- Pitcher
- Born: June 26, 2000 (age 26); Orange, Texas, U.S.
- Bats: Right Throws: Right

MLB debut
- June 4, 2026, for the Toronto Blue Jays

MLB statistics (through 2026 season)
- Win–loss record: 2–1
- Earned run average: 5.02
- Strikeouts: 17
- Stats at Baseball Reference

Teams
- Toronto Blue Jays (2026–present)

John Chadwell Dallas (born June 26, 2000) is an American professional baseball pitcher for the Toronto Blue Jays of Major League Baseball (MLB). He made his MLB debut in 2026.

== Amateur career ==
Dallas attended West Orange-Stark High School in West Orange, Texas. In his senior season, Dallas was named Orange County's Most Valuable Player, allowing only four earned runs during the season and batting .410. Undrafted out of high school, he attended Panola College for one year, where he pitched to a 5–0 win–loss record with a 1.15 earned run average (ERA) and 71 strikeouts in 39 innings pitched. Following the season, Dallas transferred to the University of Tennessee. In his first season with the Volunteers, Dallas went 3–0 with a 2.53 ERA and 21 strikeouts before the season ended prematurely due to the COVID-19 pandemic. In his second and final season in Tennessee, Dallas posted an 11–2 record with a 4.19 ERA and a team-leading 122 strikeouts in 103 innings.

== Professional career ==
The Toronto Blue Jays selected Dallas in the fourth round of the 2021 Major League Baseball draft. In 2022, he was assigned to the High-A Vancouver Canadians of the Northwest League, and debuted with five no-hit innings.

Dallas was assigned to the Triple-A Buffalo Bisons to begin the 2026 season, where he registered an 0-3 record and 4.50 ERA with 38 strikeouts across 10 appearances (eight starts).

On June 4, 2026, Dallas made his Major League debut and earned his first career win, allowing one run in 3 2/3 innings in relief of opener Mason Fluharty. Dallas combined with five other Toronto pitchers to defeat Chris Sale and the first-place Atlanta Braves, 7–2, in Atlanta. He gave up two hits, walked two and struck out two.
