= Tony LaCava =

American professional baseball executive (born 1961)

- Born: May 21, 1961 (age 65); Pittsburgh, Pennsylvania, U.S.
- Occupations: Senior Vice President, Player Personnel of the Toronto Blue Jays
- Known for: Baseball executive

Anthony F. LaCava (born May 21, 1961) is an American professional baseball executive for the Toronto Blue Jays, currently serving as their Senior Vice President, Player Personnel. In 2015, he served as the interim general manager and vice president of baseball operations for the Toronto Blue Jays of Major League Baseball (MLB), succeeding Alex Anthopoulos. LaCava was later replaced by Ross Atkins.

== Playing career ==
LaCava attended Central Catholic High School in Pittsburgh, Pennsylvania, and played for the school's baseball team. As a senior in 1979, Central Catholic won the state championship. He signed with the Pittsburgh Pirates as an undrafted free agent in 1983. He hit .302/.386/.409 in 21 games for the 1983 GCL Pirates in a utility role and was 0-for-11 with two walks for the Greenwood Pirates. In 1984, LaCava batted .153/.268/.161 in 46 games for the Macon Pirates to end his playing career.

== Executive career ==
In 1989, LaCava was hired by the California Angels as a scout, where he remained for 10 years. In 2000, he joined the Atlanta Braves as their national scouting supervisor. Later that year LaCava joined the Montreal Expos as director of player development. While working with the Expos, LaCava became acquainted with advanced metrics through contact with Baseball Prospectus writers. As a result, he used advanced stats like xFIP and BABIP in his analysis of a player. He joined the Cleveland Indians in 2002 as a national crosschecker.

In the fall of 2002, the Toronto Blue Jays named him as an assistant to the general manager, then J. P. Ricciardi. He was moved up to assistant GM in October 2007. Alex Anthopoulos also made LaCava the director of player development in 2009. LaCava was considered a candidate to become GM for the Baltimore Orioles, but turned down their offer in order to stay with the Blue Jays.

After the 2015 season, Anthopoulous opted not to remain with the Blue Jays. On November 2, 2015, LaCava was named the Blue Jays' vice president of baseball operations and interim general manager by new team president Mark Shapiro. Shapiro hired Ross Atkins as the permanent general manager on December 3, 2015, and LaCava was promoted to senior vice president of baseball operations and assistant general manager.

Preceded by Alex Anthopoulos	Toronto Blue Jays general manager 2015	Succeeded by Ross Atkins
