= Adam Macko =

Slovak-Canadian baseball player (born 2000)

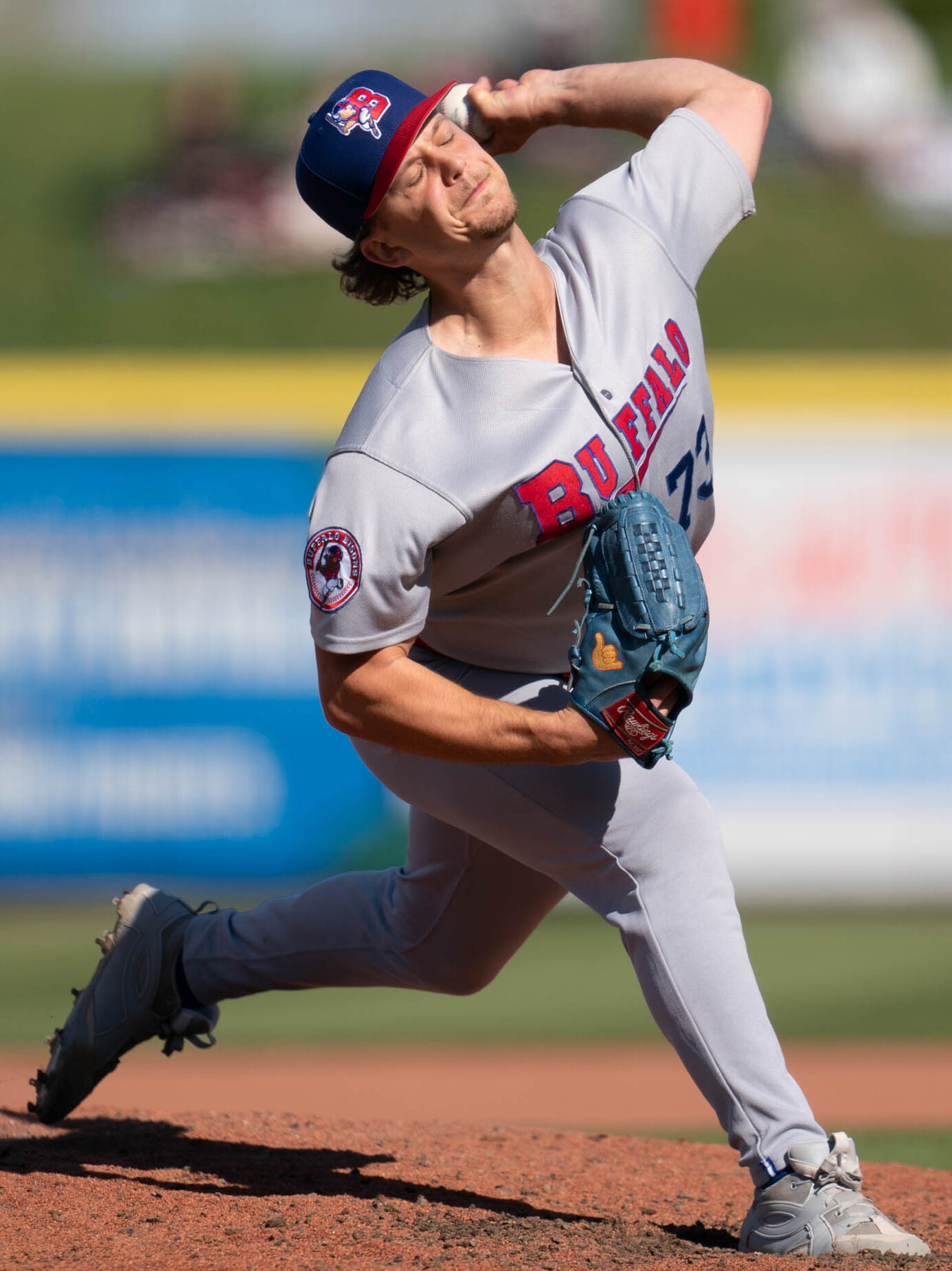
- Macko with the Buffalo Bisons in 2026

Texas Rangers – No. 71
- Pitcher
- Born: December 30, 2000 (age 25); Bratislava, Slovakia
- Bats: Left Throws: Left

MLB debut
- May 18, 2026, for the Toronto Blue Jays

MLB statistics (through 2026 season)
- Win–loss record: 2–0
- Earned run average: 5.23
- Strikeouts: 32
- Stats at Baseball Reference

Teams
- Toronto Blue Jays (2026); Texas Rangers (2026–present)

Adam Macko (born December 30, 2000) is a Slovak-born Canadian professional baseball pitcher for the Texas Rangers of Major League Baseball (MLB). He has previously played in MLB for the Toronto Blue Jays. Macko played for the Canada national baseball team at the 2026 World Baseball Classic.

Born in Bratislava, Macko moved to Canada when he was twelve years old and attended a baseball academy in Alberta. The Seattle Mariners selected him in the seventh round of the 2019 MLB draft, but traded him to the Blue Jays in 2022. Macko made his major league debut in 2026, becoming the first Slovak-born player to appear in an MLB game.

== Early life ==
Macko was born December 30, 2000, in Bratislava, Slovakia. He began playing baseball in first grade and spent time at every position before settling in as a pitcher around the age of nine. When Macko was 11 years old, his family moved to Ireland as they waited for a Canadian travel visa. There, Macko watched pitching videos on YouTube while learning the English language. The next year, Macko and his family moved to Alberta for his father's work. When he was in tenth grade, Macko enrolled at the Vauxhall Academy of Baseball in Alberta, where he played three years of high school baseball. In his final season with the Vauxhall Jets, Macko recorded a 1.27 earned run average (ERA) and 76 strikeouts over 38 1/3 innings pitched.

== Professional career ==
=== Seattle Mariners ===
The Seattle Mariners of Major League Baseball (MLB) selected Macko in the seventh round, with the 216th overall pick, of the 2019 Major League Baseball draft. He joined the organization on a $250,000 signing bonus and reported to their facility in Peoria, Arizona, to begin his professional baseball career. Macko made eight appearances for the Rookie-level Arizona League Mariners in 2019, putting up an 0–3 win–loss record and 3.38 ERA while striking out 31 batters in 21 1/3 innings. He also made one spot appearance for the Everett AquaSox that July, pitching two scoreless innings.

When the effects of the COVID-19 pandemic forced the cancellation of the 2020 minor league season, Macko spent two months exercising with minor league pitching coach Sean McGrath at a camp near Elon University. He then attended the Arizona Instructional League for additional practice. When the minor leagues returned to play in May 2021, Macko was assigned to the Single-A Modesto Nuts of the California League. Shoulder soreness limited him to only nine starts in Modesto, during which he went 2–2 with a 4.59 ERA and 56 strikeouts in 33 1/3 innings.

Macko began the 2022 season with the AquaSox in the High-A Northwest League. After going 0–2 with a 3.99 ERA in eight starts, and 60 strikeouts in 38 1/3 innings, Macko was sidelined by injury at the start of June. He was expected to return at some point later in the season, but was transferred to the 60-day injured list in August. After the regular minor league season ended, Macko returned from a left elbow strain and a right knee injury to pitch for the Peoria Javelinas of the Arizona Fall League. In seven fall league games, Macko was 0–1 with a 6.08 ERA, striking out 14 batters in 13 1/3 innings.

=== Toronto Blue Jays ===
On November 16, 2022, the Mariners traded Macko and Erik Swanson to the Toronto Blue Jays in exchange for outfielder Teoscar Hernández. He opened the 2023 season with the Vancouver Canadians, Toronto's Northwest League affiliate. He made 20 regular season starts there, going 5–5 with a 4.81 ERA while striking out 106 batters in 86 innings. Macko was especially effective late in the season, with a 3.63 ERA and 35 strikeouts in August. Macko and the Canadians won the 2023 Northwest League championship, defeating the AquaSox in a best-of-five series. At the end of the season, the Blue Jays added Macko to the 40-man roster to protect him in the Rule 5 draft.

Macko was optioned to the Triple–A Buffalo Bisons to begin the 2024 season. In 20 appearances split between the Single-A Dunedin Blue Jays, Double-A New Hampshire Fisher Cats, and Buffalo, Macko accumulated a 5–5 record and 4.63 ERA with 105 strikeouts across 93 1/3 innings pitched.

On February 17, 2025, it was announced that Macko would require surgery to repair a torn meniscus in his left knee. Macko was optioned to Triple-A Buffalo to begin the 2026 season. In 13 appearances for the Bisons, he posted a 2–2 record and 4.50 ERA with 19 strikeouts over 18 innings of work.

When Tommy Nance was placed on the injured list, the Blue Jays promoted Macko to take his place. He made his major league debut on May 18, 2026, retiring all three New York Yankees hitters he faced. In doing so, Macko became the first Slovak-born pitcher to appear in an MLB game. On May 21, Macko recorded his first career win after tossing 1 1/3 scoreless innings against the Yankees. He made 22 appearances (including one start) for Toronto, logging a 2–0 record and 4.91 ERA with 23 strikeouts over 22 innings of work.

=== Texas Rangers ===
On August 3, 2026, the Blue Jays traded Macko to the Texas Rangers in exchange for Josh Smith and Josh Stephan.

== International career ==
Macko is eligible to represent Canada and Slovakia in international competition. He has expressed interest in representing Slovakia at the European Baseball Championship in the future. In October 2025, it was reported he was also eligible for the Czech Republic national baseball team at the World Baseball Classic, through his parents, who were born before the dissolution of Czechoslovakia.

== See also ==
- List of Major League Baseball players from Europe
