= Tanner Andrews =

American baseball player (born 1995)

Free agent
- Pitcher
- Born: November 15, 1995 (age 31); Rochester, Indiana, U.S.
- Bats: Right Throws: Right

MLB debut
- May 25, 2026, for the Toronto Blue Jays

MLB statistics (through 2026 season)
- Win–loss record: 0-0
- Earned run average: 0.00
- Strikeouts: 1
- Stats at Baseball Reference

Teams
- Toronto Blue Jays (2026)

Tanner Logan Andrews (born November 15, 1995) is an American professional baseball pitcher who is a free agent. He has previously played in Major League Baseball (MLB) for the Toronto Blue Jays. He made his MLB debut in 2026.

== Career ==
Andrews attended Tippecanoe Valley High School in Akron, Indiana, and Purdue University. He played college baseball for the Purdue Boilermakers.

=== Miami Marlins ===
The Miami Marlins selected Andrews in the 10th round, with the 297th pick, of the 2018 Major League Baseball draft. He signed with Miami for a $10,000 signing bonus, and split his first professional season between the rookie–level Gulf Coast League Marlins and Low–A Batavia Muckdogs.

Andrews split the 2019 campaign between the Single–A Clinton LumberKings and High–A Jupiter Hammerheads, recording a cumulative 8–5 record and 3.50 ERA with 110 strikeouts and two saves over 128 2/3 innings of work. He did not play in a game in 2020 due to the cancellation of the minor league season because of the COVID-19 pandemic.

Andrews returned to action in 2021 with the Double–A Pensacola Blue Wahoos, but struggled to an 11.12 ERA with nine strikeouts; his season ended after he underwent Tommy John surgery on July 7.

=== San Francisco Giants ===
On December 9, 2021, Andrews was selected by the Atlanta Braves in the Rule 5 draft and was subsequently to the San Francisco Giants in exchange for cash considerations. He split the 2022 campaign between the rookie–level Arizona Complex League Giants, Single–A San Jose Giants, High–A Eugene Emeralds, and Double–A Richmond Flying Squirrels, accumulating a 2–0 record and 0.92 ERA with 30 strikeouts across 19 2/3 innings pitched.

Andrews made 27 appearances (two starts) for the Triple–A Sacramento River Cats in 2023, posting a 3–3 record and 5.74 ERA with 53 strikeouts; he appeared in 38 games out of the bullpen for Sacramento in 2024, compiling a 3–6 record and 6.95 ERA with 76 strikeouts and two saves.

=== Staten Island FerryHawks ===
Andrews began the 2025 season with the Staten Island FerryHawks of the Atlantic League of Professional Baseball. He made 15 scoreless appearances for Staten Island, recording two wins, 25 strikeouts, and three saves across 13 2/3 innings pitched.

=== Minnesota Twins ===
On June 13, 2025, Andrews's contract was purchased by the Minnesota Twins. He made 14 appearances for the Double–A Wichita Wind Surge, logging a 1–3 record and 3.78 ERA with 18 strikeouts and two saves across 16 2/3 innings pitched. Andrews elected free agency following the season on November 6.

=== Toronto Blue Jays ===
On November 26, 2025, Andrews signed a minor league contract with the Toronto Blue Jays. The Blue Jays later gave him an invite to spring training. Andrews was assigned to Triple-A Buffalo Bisons to begin the 2026 season. On May 25, 2026, Andrews was selected to the 40-man roster and promoted to the major leagues for the first time. He made his MLB debut the same day, tossing a scoreless inning against the Miami Marlins. Following another scoreless appearance, Andrews was designated for assignment by the Blue Jays on June 4. He cleared waivers and was sent outright to Triple-A Buffalo on June 7. He elected free agency on November 2.

== See also ==
- Rule 5 draft results
