= CJ Van Eyk =

American baseball player (born 1998)

Free agent
- Pitcher
- Born: September 15, 1998 (age 28); Tampa, Florida, U.S.
- Bats: Right Throws: Right

MLB debut
- July 17, 2026, for the Toronto Blue Jays

MLB statistics (through 2026 season)
- Win–loss record: 0–2
- Earned run average: 5.40
- Strikeouts: 3
- Stats at Baseball Reference

Teams
- Toronto Blue Jays (2026)

Cornelis Johannes Van Eyk (/aɪk/ EYEK; born September 15, 1998) is an American professional baseball pitcher who is a free agent. He played college baseball at Florida State University and was selected by the Blue Jays in the second round of the 2020 MLB draft.

== Amateur career ==
Van Eyk attended and graduated from Steinbrenner High School in Lutz, Florida. In 2017, his senior year, he went 5–1 with a 0.73 ERA. He was drafted by the New York Mets in the 19th round of the 2017 Major League Baseball draft, but elected to fulfill his commitment to play college baseball at Florida State University.

In 2018, Van Eyk's freshman year at Florida State, he appeared in 19 games (making five starts) in which he went 7–0 with a 2.86 ERA, striking out 71 batters over 56 2/3 innings, earning ACC All-Freshman honors. As a sophomore in 2019, he started 17 games, going 10–3 with a 3.80 ERA, compiling 120 strikeouts over 94 2/3 innings, earning All-ACC Third Team honors. For the 2020 season, he was named the Seminoles' opening day starter. He appeared in four games before the college baseball season was cut short due to the COVID-19 pandemic.

== Professional career ==
Van Eyk was selected by the Toronto Blue Jays in the second round with the 42nd overall pick of the 2020 Major League Baseball draft. He signed with the Blue Jays on June 18 and received a $1.8 million bonus.

Van Eyk made his professional debut and spent all of the 2021 season with the Vancouver Canadians of the High-A West, starting 19 games and pitching to a 4–6 record, a 5.83 ERA, and 100 strikeouts over 80 1/3 innings. He underwent Tommy John surgery after the season, forcing him to miss all of 2022.

Van Eyk returned to action in 2023 with the rookie-level Florida Complex League Blue Jays, Single-A Dunedin Blue Jays, and Double-A New Hampshire Fisher Cats. In 12 appearances (11 starts) split between the three affiliates, he accumulated an 0–2 record and 3.67 ERA with 33 strikeouts across 34 1/3 innings pitched. Van Eyk made 30 appearances (16 starts) for New Hampshire during the 2024 campaign, registering a 3–8 record and 5.68 ERA with 78 strikeouts and two saves across 95 innings pitched. He played the 2025 season with New Hampshire and the Triple-A Buffalo Bisons and had a 6–10 record, a 4.79 ERA, and 109 strikeouts across 126 innings pitched.

In 2026, Van Eyk spent the beginning of the season in Buffalo, going 5–3 with an ERA of 3.79 across his first 17 games. On July 12, Van Eyk was selected to the 40-man roster and promoted to the major leagues for the first time. He made his MLB debut on July 17 against the Chicago White Sox at Rogers Centre and pitched two scoreless innings in relief. He was optioned back to Buffalo the following day. Van Eyk was recalled and optioned by the Blue Jays three more times during the season. He pitched in a total of five games for Toronto and ended the season with a 0–2 record, a 5.40 ERA, and three strikeouts across 11 2/3 innings pitched. On November 2, Van Eyk was removed from the 40–man roster and elected free agency.
