= Lenyn Sosa =

Venezuelan baseball player (born 2000)

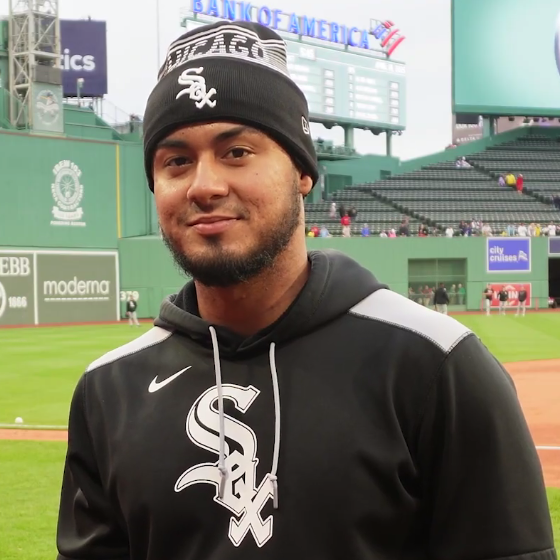
- Sosa with the Chicago White Sox in 2025

Free agent
- Infielder
- Born: January 25, 2000 (age 26); Puerto Ordaz, Venezuela
- Bats: Right Throws: Right

MLB debut
- June 23, 2022, for the Chicago White Sox

MLB statistics (through May 19, 2026)
- Batting average: .243
- Home runs: 38
- Runs batted in: 134
- Stats at Baseball Reference

Teams
- Chicago White Sox (2022–2026); Toronto Blue Jays (2026)
Medals
Men's baseball
Representing Venezuela
U-15 Baseball World Cup
Bronze medal – third place	2014 Mazatlán	Team

Lenyn José Sosa (born January 25, 2000) is a Venezuelan professional baseball infielder who is a free agent. He has previously played in Major League Baseball (MLB) for the Chicago White Sox and Toronto Blue Jays.

== Career ==
=== Chicago White Sox ===
Sosa signed with the Chicago White Sox as an international free agent on July 2, 2016. Sosa made his professional debut with the rookie-level Arizona League White Sox in 2017, hitting .270/.330/.359 in 42 games. In 2018, Sosa played for the rookie-level Great Falls Voyagers, batting .294/.317/.406 with four home runs, 35 RBI, and two stolen bases. For the 2019 season, Sosa played with the Single-A Kannapolis Intimidators, where he hit .252/.292/.371 with seven home runs and 51 RBI across 122 games.

Sosa did not play in a game in 2020 due to the cancellation of the minor league season because of the COVID-19 pandemic. He split the 2021 season between the High-A Winston-Salem Dash and Double-A Birmingham Barons, hitting .271/.300/.401 with 11 home runs and 56 RBI across 117 games. Sosa was assigned to Double-A Birmingham to begin the 2022 season.

Sosa was selected to the 40-man roster and called up to the majors for the first time on June 23, 2022. He collected his first career hit on June 26, roping a double off of Baltimore Orioles starter Jordan Lyles. On August 9, during the second game of a double-header, Sosa hit his first Major League home run off of Kansas City Royals pitcher Jonathan Heasley.

Sosa was optioned to the Triple-A Charlotte Knights to begin the 2023 season. In 52 games for Chicago, he batted .201/.224/.348 with six home runs and 14 RBI. Sosa was again optioned to Triple–A Charlotte to begin the 2024 season. He would go one to make 100 appearances for Chicago during the year, slashing .254/.283/.359 with eight home runs, 35 RBI, and three stolen bases.

Sosa made 140 appearances for the White Sox during the 2025 campaign, batting .264/.293/.434 with career-highs in home runs (22) and RBI (75). He began the 2026 season with Chicago, going 7-for-33 (.212) with three RBI across his first 12 games.

=== Toronto Blue Jays ===
On April 13, 2026, the White Sox traded Sosa to the Toronto Blue Jays in exchange for Jordan Rich and a player to be named later or cash considerations. In 28 appearances for Toronto, he slashed .188/.205/.275 with one home run and six RBI. On May 28, Sosa was placed on the injured list due to a right wrist contusion. He was transferred to the 60–day injured list on August 2. On August 18, Sosa was reinstated from the 60–day injured list; however, he was subsequently removed from the 40–man roster and sent outright to Triple-A Buffalo. Sosa was released by the Blue Jays on September 18.
