= Brett Bateman =

American baseball player (born 2002)

Toronto Blue Jays – No. 21
- Outfielder
- Born: March 19, 2002 (age 24); Saint Paul, Minnesota, U.S.
- Bats: Left Throws: Left

MLB debut
- August 7, 2026, for the Toronto Blue Jays

MLB statistics (through 2026 season)
- Batting average: .329
- Home runs: 2
- Runs batted in: 11
- Stats at Baseball Reference

Teams
- Toronto Blue Jays (2026–present)

Brett Allen Bateman (born March 19, 2002) is an American professional baseball outfielder for the Toronto Blue Jays of Major League Baseball (MLB). He made his MLB debut in 2026.

== Early life ==
Bateman attended Mounds View High School in Arden Hills, Minnesota and played three years of college baseball at the University of Minnesota for the Minnesota Golden Gophers. In 2021 and 2022, he played collegiate summer baseball in the Northwoods League with the Willmar Stingers. As a junior for the Golden Gophers in 2023, Bateman hit .354 with 17 stolen bases across 50 games. After the 2023 collegiate season, he played in 13 games with the Cotuit Kettleers of the Cape Cod Baseball League and batted .500 across 46 at-bats.

== Professional career ==
=== Chicago Cubs ===
Bateman was selected by the Chicago Cubs in the eighth round of the 2023 Major League Baseball draft. He signed with the team for $180,000. Bateman made his professional debut with the rookie-level Arizona Complex League Cubs and was quickly promoted to the Single-A Myrtle Beach Pelicans, hitting .283 with 16 RBI and 14 stolen bases across 32 games played. In 2024, he began the season with the High-A South Bend Cubs and was promoted to the Double-A Tennessee Smokies during the season. Over 107 games played with both teams, Bateman batted .272 with one home run, 30 RBI and 30 stolen bases. Bateman returned to the Smokies for the entirety of the 2025 season and hit .261 with two home runs, 33 RBI, and 19 stolen bases. He was assigned to the Triple-A Iowa Cubs to open the 2026 season. Bateman played in 82 games for Iowa and had a .312/.430/.421 slash line with three home runs, 33 RBI, and 20 stolen bases.

=== Toronto Blue Jays ===
On August 2, 2026, the Cubs traded Bateman and Ty Southisene to the Toronto Blue Jays in exchange for Kevin Gausman. After playing two games with the Triple-A Buffalo Bisons, he was promoted to the major league roster after an injury to infielder Luis Urías and made his MLB debut on August 7 against the Philadelphia Phillies. Bateman recorded his first MLB hit, a double off of Phillies starter Zack Wheeler, on the first pitch he saw during his first major league at-bat. He hit his first MLB home run on September 11, a two-run home run, off Baltimore Orioles pitcher Alex Hoppe. Bateman missed a brief period of time with right hip discomfort. He played in a total of 41 games for Toronto and ended the season with a .329 batting average, two home runs, 11 RBI, and seven doubles.

== Personal life ==
Bateman's father was the head coach for the Augsburg University baseball team from 2004 to 2026. His mother is Korean and was adopted by an American couple when she was three years old.
