= Sean Keys =

American baseball player (born 2003)

Toronto Blue Jays – No. 20
- First baseman / Third baseman
- Born: May 26, 2003 (age 23); Huntington, New York, U.S.
- Bats: Left Throws: Right

MLB debut
- June 27, 2026, for the Toronto Blue Jays

MLB statistics (through 2026 season)
- Batting average: .197
- Home runs: 2
- Run batted in: 9
- Stats at Baseball Reference

Teams
- Toronto Blue Jays (2026–present)

Sean Thomas Keys (born May 26, 2003) is an American professional baseball first baseman and third baseman for the Toronto Blue Jays of Major League Baseball (MLB). He made his MLB debut in 2026.

== Career ==
Keys attended Harborfields High School in Greenlawn, New York, and Bucknell University, where he played college baseball for the Bucknell Bison. In 2023 and 2024, he played collegiate summer baseball with the Cotuit Kettleers of the Cape Cod Baseball League.

The Toronto Blue Jays selected Keys in the fourth round of the 2024 Major League Baseball draft, 125th overall. He signed for $569,700. With the Single-A Dunedin Blue Jays in 2024, he batted .293, with four doubles, three triples, a home run, 20 runs batted in and 13 walks in 98 plate appearances. At the High-A Vancouver Canadians in 2025, he recorded 22 doubles and 21 home runs, while his average dropped to .217. He also walked 86 times.

Keys made 67 appearances split between the Double-A New Hampshire Fisher Cats and Triple-A Buffalo Bisons, batting a cumulative .284/.409/.619 with 21 home runs, 54 RBI, and seven stolen bases. On June 27, 2026, Keys was selected to the 40-man roster and promoted to the major leagues for the first time. On July 1, Keys hit his first major league home run, off of Freddy Peralta of the New York Mets, in a 9–3 win.
