= Tyler Rogers =

American baseball player (born 1990)

Toronto Blue Jays – No. 71
- Pitcher
- Born: December 17, 1990 (age 35); Denver, Colorado, U.S.
- Bats: Right Throws: Right

MLB debut
- August 27, 2019, for the San Francisco Giants

MLB statistics (through 2026 season)
- Win–loss record: 28–26
- Earned run average: 2.62
- Strikeouts: 346
- Stats at Baseball Reference

Teams
- San Francisco Giants (2019–2025); New York Mets (2025); Toronto Blue Jays (2026–present)
Medals
Men's baseball
Representing United States
World Baseball Classic
Silver medal – second place	2026 Miami	Team

Tyler Scott Rogers (born December 17, 1990) is an American professional baseball pitcher for the Toronto Blue Jays of Major League Baseball (MLB). He has previously played in MLB for the San Francisco Giants and New York Mets.

Rogers played college baseball for the Garden City Broncbusters and Austin Peay Governors. He was selected by the Giants in the 10th round of the 2013 MLB draft and made his MLB debut with the team in 2019. With the Giants, Rogers led the National League (NL) in games pitched for the 2020, 2021, and 2024 seasons. He played for the Giants until July 2025, when he was traded to the Mets for the remainder of the season. Rogers led MLB in games pitched during the 2025 season. He subsequently became a free agent and signed with the Blue Jays.

Rogers is known for his unconventional submarine-style pitching, an extreme sidearm motion in which the ball is released below knee level. His 1.33 feet release point is the lowest in MLB.

== Early life ==
Rogers was born on December 17, 1990, in Denver, Colorado. Raised in Littleton, he attended Chatfield Senior High School, graduating in 2009.

== College career ==
Rogers initially attended Garden City Community College in Garden City, Kansas, and played college baseball for the Garden City Broncbusters from 2010 to 2011. During his sophomore season in 2011, he posted a 6–3 win–loss record, a 2.39 earned run average (ERA), and 50 strikeouts in 49.0 innings pitched across 34 games. Rogers was a second-team All-Kansas Jayhawk Community College Conference selection.

After two seasons with Garden City, Rogers transferred to Austin Peay State University in Clarksville, Tennessee, to play for the Austin Peay Governors from 2012 to 2013. During his junior season in 2012, he posted a 4–4 record, a 2.25 ERA, and 52 strikeouts in 59 2/3 innings pitched, while making an Ohio Valley Conference record-tying 38 appearances and saving 10 games.

== Professional career ==
=== Draft and minor leagues ===
Rogers was selected 312th overall by the San Francisco Giants in the 10th round of the 2013 MLB draft. He signed for a signing bonus of $7,500. Rogers split the 2013 season between the Arizona League Giants and the Salem-Keizer Volcanoes, posting a combined 1–1 record, a 2.30 ERA, and 31 strikeouts in 27.1 innings pitched.

Rogers split the 2014 season between the Augusta GreenJackets and the San Jose Giants, posting a combined 4–0 record with two saves, a 1.81 ERA, and 83 strikeouts in 89 2/3 innings pitched. Rogers split the 2015 season between San Jose and the Richmond Flying Squirrels, posting a combined 5–2 record with one save, a 2.00 ERA, and 101 strikeouts in 90.0 innings pitched.

Rogers split the 2016 season between the Flying Squirrels and the Sacramento River Cats, posting a combined 2–2 record with 11 saves, a 3.27 ERA, and 46 strikeouts in 66.0 innings pitched. During the off-season, he played for the Scottsdale Scorpions in the Arizona Fall League (AFL) and was named an AFL Rising Star.

Rogers spent the 2017 season with the River Cats, posting a 4–4 record with 10 saves, a 2.37 ERA, and 43 strikeouts in 76.0 innings pitched. He was named a PCL mid-season All-Star.

Rogers remained with the River Cats for the 2018 season, posting a 3–2 record with three saves, a 2.13 ERA, and 60 strikeouts in 67 2/3 innings pitched. For the second consecutive season, he was named a PCL mid-season All-Star.

Rogers began the 2019 season with the River Cats, posting a 4–2 record with five saves, a 4.21 ERA, and 55 strikeouts in 62.0 innings pitched.

=== San Francisco Giants (2019–2025) ===
On August 27, 2019, the Giants selected Rogers' contract and promoted him to the major leagues for the first time. He made his debut that night against the Arizona Diamondbacks, pitching a scoreless inning in relief. Rogers finished the 2019 season going 2–0 with a 1.02 ERA and 16 strikeouts over 17 2/3 innings for the Giants. In 2019, his four-seam fastball was on average the slowest in the majors, at 83.1 mph, as was his sinker, at 82.2 mph.

In 2020, Rogers was 3–3 with three saves, 10 holds (tied for 3rd-most in MLB), and a 4.50 ERA in a National League (NL)-leading 29 games. He pitched 28 innings, in which he averaged 1.93 walks per 9 innings. Balls hit against him had the second-lowest barrel rate in the NL, at 2.0%. His sinker was again on average the slowest in the majors, at 82.4 mph, his slider was the slowest, at 71.4 mph, and his fastball was in the slowest 1% in MLB, at 82.5 mph.

In 2021, Rogers was 7–1 with 13 saves, 30 holds (3rd-most in MLB), and a 2.22 ERA. He led the NL for the second year in a row, with 80 games pitched, and pitched 81 innings in which he averaged 1.4 walks per 9 innings (his 4.0% walk rate was in the best 2% in MLB). Balls hit against him had the second-slowest exit velocity of those hit against any NL pitcher, at 84.6 mph, and the barrel rate of balls hit against him was the lowest in MLB at 2.0%. His salary was $583,000. In 2021, his fastball was on average the slowest in MLB, at 83.0 mph, as was his sinker for the third season in a row, at 82.8 mph, and his slider for the second season in a row, at 71.9 mph.

In 2022 with the Giants, Rogers was 3–4 with a 3.57 ERA. He pitched in 68 games (6th in the NL), in which he pitched 75 2/3 innings. Balls hit against him had the slowest exit velocity of those hit against any pitcher, at 84.2 mph, and the barrel rate of balls hit against him was the fifth-lowest in MLB at 2.8%. Rogers' fastball velocity was on average 83.2 mph, in the slowest 1% in baseball for the fourth season in a row, his average sinker was 83 mph, and his average slider was 72 mph.

On January 13, 2023, Rogers agreed to a one-year, $1.675 million contract with the Giants, avoiding salary arbitration, joining his brother, Taylor, who signed with the team weeks earlier. In 68 games, he pitched to a 3.04 ERA with a record of 4–5 in 74 innings.

On January 11, 2024, Rogers signed a $3.2 million contract with the Giants to avoid arbitration. He played in 77 games in 2024, posting a 3–4 record, a 2.82 ERA, and 51 strikeouts in 70^{1}/_{3} innings pitched.

In 2025 with the Giants, Rogers played in 53 games with a 4–3 record, a 1.80 ERA, and 38 strikeouts in 50 innings pitched.

=== New York Mets (2025) ===
On July 30, 2025, the Giants traded Rogers to the New York Mets for Blade Tidwell, Drew Gilbert, and José Buttó. He made 25 appearances down the stretch, posting an 0–3 record, a 2.30 ERA, and 10 strikeouts in 27 1/3 innings pitched.

Rogers finished the 2025 season with a 4–6 record, a 1.98 ERA, and 48 strikeouts in 77 1/3 innings pitched across 81 relief appearances; he led MLB with 81 games pitched. His 2.1% barrel rate (Brls/BBE %) and 2.3% walk rate (BB%) were the lowest in MLB. After the 2025 season, Rogers became a free agent.

=== Toronto Blue Jays (2026–present) ===
On December 15, 2025, Rogers signed a three-year, $37 million contract with the Toronto Blue Jays. The deal includes a vesting option for a fourth season.

Rogers made 74 appearances for the Blue Jays during the 2026 season, finishing with a 2–3 record, a 1.77 ERA, and 40 strikeouts across 71 innings pitched.

== Player profile ==
Rogers is known for his unconventional submarine-style pitching, an extreme sidearm motion in which the ball is released below knee level. His 1.33 feet release point is the lowest in MLB.

== Personal life ==
Rogers has a mirror-image twin brother, Taylor, who is 30 seconds older. Taylor is also a pitcher in Major League Baseball (MLB). On August 27, 2019, the Rogers brothers became the tenth set of twins to play in MLB after Tyler made his MLB debut pitching for the San Francisco Giants, while Taylor was pitching for the Minnesota Twins. On April 11, 2022, the Rogers brothers became the fifth set of twins to play in the same MLB game, with Tyler pitching for the Giants and Taylor pitching for the San Diego Padres. Additionally, it was the second time in MLB history that twins pitched in the same game and the first time they did so for opposing teams.
