= John Schneider (baseball) =

American baseball coach (born 1980)

Toronto Blue Jays – No. 14
- Coach / Manager
- Born: February 14, 1980 (age 46); Princeton, New Jersey, U.S.
- Bats: Right Throws: Right

Career statistics (through September 5, 2026)
- Managerial record: 375–328
- Winning percentage: .533
- Stats at Baseball Reference
- Managerial record at Baseball Reference

Teams
- As manager: Toronto Blue Jays (2022–present); As coach: Toronto Blue Jays (2019–2022)

John Patrick Schneider (born February 14, 1980) is an American professional baseball coach who is the manager of the Toronto Blue Jays of Major League Baseball (MLB). He became a coach for the Blue Jays in 2019 and became interim manager on July 13, 2022. After the 2022 season, the Blue Jays hired him as their permanent manager. Prior to coaching, Schneider played six seasons as a catcher in the Blue Jays minor league organization.

== Playing career ==
Born in Princeton, New Jersey and raised in Lawrence Township, Mercer County, New Jersey, Schneider graduated from Lawrence High School in 1998. He attended the University of Delaware and played college baseball for the Fightin' Blue Hens. In three seasons, he batted .306 with 23 home runs and 139 runs batted in (RBIs). In 2001, he played collegiate summer baseball with the Chatham A's of the Cape Cod Baseball League. Schneider was selected by the Detroit Tigers in the 24th round of the 2001 Major League Baseball draft, but did not sign, and was chosen by the Toronto Blue Jays in the 13th round of the 2002 draft. He was assigned to the Short Season-A Auburn Doubledays for the 2002 season, and hit .240 with two home runs and 11 RBIs. The following year, Schneider played for the Class-A Charleston AlleyCats and the Triple-A Syracuse SkyChiefs, and batted .188 with 14 RBIs in 59 games.

Schneider played the entire 2004 season with the Advanced-A Dunedin Blue Jays, appearing in 58 games and batting .206 with six home runs and 28 RBIs. With Dunedin in 2005, he hit .321 in 22 games and was promoted back to Triple-A Syracuse, but struggled to a .179 average through 34 games with the SkyChiefs. Schneider played at three different minor league levels in 2006, including the New Hampshire Fisher Cats, but was limited to 34 games due to back surgery. He retired after the 2007 minor league season, due to three concussions suffered during the season.

== Coaching/managerial career ==
After retiring as a player, Schneider was hired by the Blue Jays organization as a catching instructor. In 2008, he became the manager of the Rookie-level Gulf Coast League Blue Jays. Schneider was promoted to manage the Short Season-A Vancouver Canadians on December 1, 2010, and became the youngest manager in team history at 30 years of age. In 2011, he managed the Canadians, but took a personal leave of absence during the season. Vancouver won the league's championship in 2011. Schneider returned to the Gulf Coast League in 2013, and then went back to managing Vancouver in 2014 and 2015. In 2016, he managed the Single-A Lansing Lugnuts, and in 2017, won the first Florida State League championship in the 33-year history of the Dunedin Blue Jays. On January 10, 2018, Schneider was promoted to manage the New Hampshire Fisher Cats, and led the team to an Eastern League championship. At the end of the season, he was named the Eastern League Manager of the Year.

The Blue Jays promoted Schneider to their major league coaching staff before the 2019 season to work with Blue Jays catchers. He pitched to Vladimir Guerrero Jr. during the 2019 Major League Baseball Home Run Derby. The Blue Jays promoted Schneider to become their bench coach for the 2022 season.

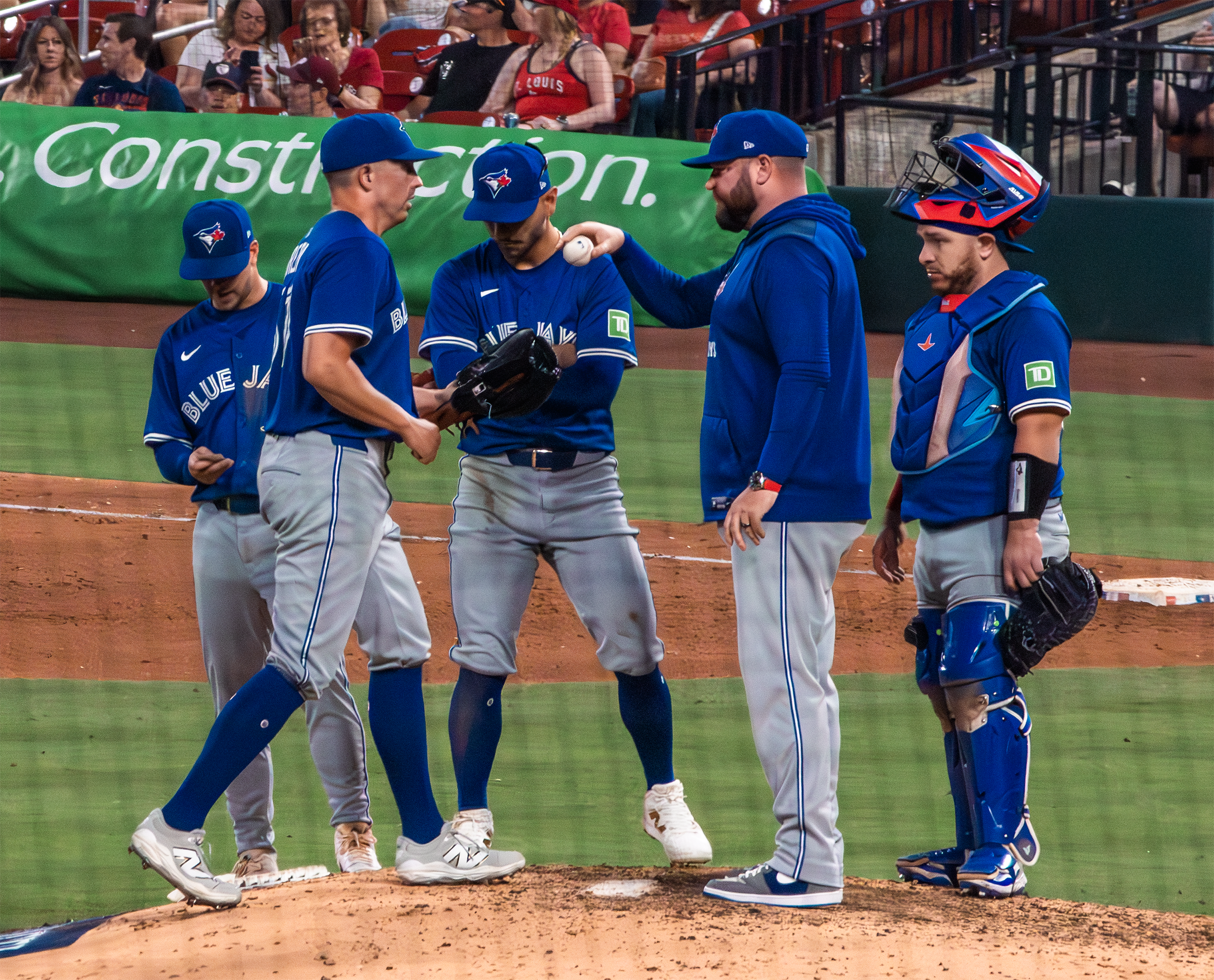
Schneider (right centre) takes the ball from Blue Jays pitcher. Chad Green

On July 13, 2022, the Blue Jays fired Charlie Montoyo as their manager and named Schneider their interim manager for the remainder of the season. He won his first game as manager that night. Schneider led the Blue Jays to a 46–28 (.622) record and to the 2022 American League Wild Card Series as the Blue Jays manager in 2022. On October 21, 2022, the Blue Jays hired Schneider as their full-time manager, and signed him to a three-year contract with an option for a fourth season. On September 28, 2025 his Blue Jays team clinched their first American League East division title in ten years. On October 20, 2025, his team advanced to the 2025 World Series, winning the AL pennant, 4 games to 3, over the Seattle Mariners. Schneider would go on to coach the Blue Jays for seven games in the World Series, where they were eliminated by the Los Angeles Dodgers 5-4 in game 7. On November 6, 2025, the Blue Jays picked up the team option on Schneider’s contract, allowing him to return for the 2026 season.

On March 23, 2026, the Blue Jays announced that Schneider had agreed to a contract extension that runs through the 2028 season.

=== Managerial record ===
As of games played on July 12, 2026

Team	Year	Regular season					Postseason			
Team	Year	Games	Won	Lost	Win %	Finish	Won	Lost	Win %	Result
TOR	2022	74	46	28	.622	2nd in AL East	0	2	.000	Lost ALWC (SEA)
TOR	2023	162	89	73	.549	3rd in AL East	0	2	.000	Lost ALWC (MIN)
TOR	2024	162	74	88	.457	5th in AL East	–	–	–	–
TOR	2025	162	94	68	.580	1st in AL East	10	8	.556	Lost World Series (LAD)
TOR	2026	162	79	83	.488	5th in AL East	–	–	–	–
Total		721	381	340	.528		10	12	.455	

== Personal life ==
Schneider has two siblings. His older brother Matt played basketball for Muhlenberg College. His younger brother Kevin played baseball at Monmouth University. His parents, David and Cathy, live in New Jersey.

Schneider married his wife Jessy in 2015. They have two sons; Gunner, born in 2016, and Greyson, born in 2018.
