= Yohendrick Piñango =

Venezuelan baseball player (born 2002)

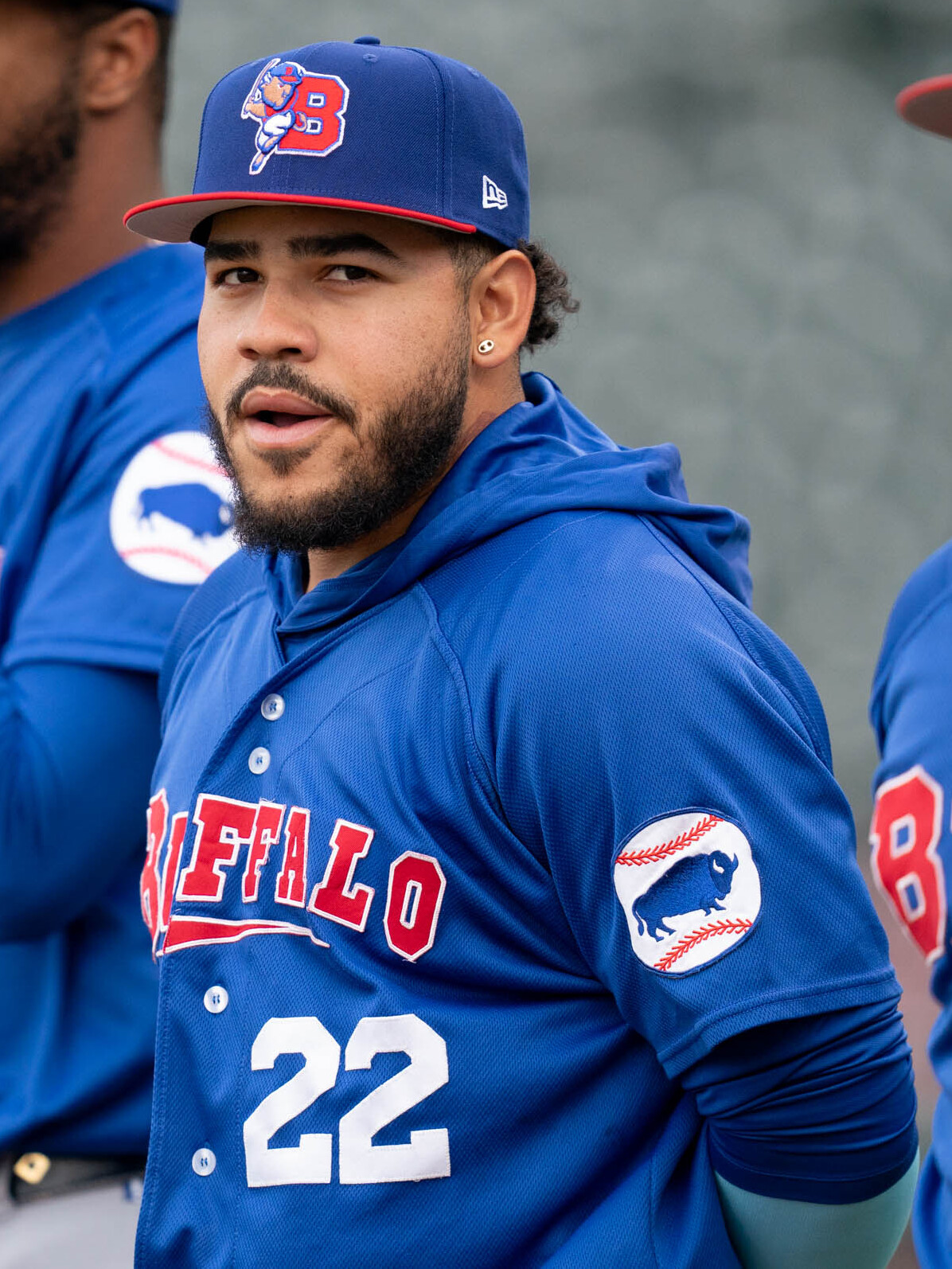
- Piñango with the Buffalo Bisons in 2026

Toronto Blue Jays – No. 24
- Outfielder
- Born: May 7, 2002 (age 24); Carora, Venezuela
- Bats: Left Throws: Left

MLB debut
- April 26, 2026, for the Toronto Blue Jays

MLB statistics (through 2026 season)
- Batting average: .260
- Home runs: 5
- Runs batted in: 20
- Stats at Baseball Reference

Teams
- Toronto Blue Jays (2026–present)

Yohendrick Alexander Piñango (born May 7, 2002) is a Venezuelan professional baseball outfielder for the Toronto Blue Jays of Major League Baseball (MLB). He made his MLB debut in 2026.

== Professional career ==
=== Chicago Cubs ===
Piñango signed with the Chicago Cubs as an international free agent in July 2018. He made his professional debut in 2019 with the Dominican Summer League Cubs. He did not play in 2020 due to the minor league baseball season being cancelled because of the COVID-19 pandemic.

Piñango played 2021 with the Myrtle Beach Pelicans and South Bend Cubs. He played 2022 and 2023 with South Bend and started 2024 with South Bend before being promoted to the Tennessee Smokies.

=== Toronto Blue Jays ===
On July 27, 2024, Piñango and Josh Rivera were traded to the Toronto Blue Jays in exchange for Nate Pearson. He started his Blue Jays career with the Double-A New Hampshire Fisher Cats.

Piñango started 2025 with New Hampshire before being promoted to the Triple-A Buffalo Bisons.

Piñango returned to Buffalo to begin the 2026 season, batting .288/.370/.488 with three home runs and 13 RBI across his first 22 games. On April 25, 2026, Piñango was promoted to the major leagues for the first time. Piñango made his major league debut on April 26 against the Cleveland Guardians, where he collected his first major league hit. On May 16, Piñango hit his first major league home run, off of Kyle Finnegan of the Detroit Tigers, in a 2–1 win.

== Personal life ==
Piñango was raised by his mother, Yarbelys, and his elder sister, Noris. His father, Reyito, was killed in May 2008 when Yohendrick was six.
