= Lázaro Estrada =

Cuban baseball player (born 1999)

Toronto Blue Jays
- Pitcher
- Born: April 24, 1999 (age 27); Havana, Cuba
- Bats: Right Throws: Right

MLB debut
- July 5, 2025, for the Toronto Blue Jays

MLB statistics (through 2026 season)
- Win–loss record: 1–1
- Earned run average: 6.64
- Strikeouts: 19
- Stats at Baseball Reference

Teams
- Toronto Blue Jays (2025–2026)

Lázaro Alejandro Estrada (born April 24, 1999) is a Cuban professional baseball pitcher in the Toronto Blue Jays organization. He made his Major League Baseball (MLB) debut in 2025.

== Career ==
Estrada signed with the Toronto Blue Jays as an international free agent on January 4, 2018. He made his professional debut with the Dominican Summer League Blue Jays. Estrada spent the 2019 season with the rookie-level Bluefield Blue Jays, posting a 2–3 record and 5.85 ERA with 39 strikeouts across 11 games (nine starts). He did not play in a game in 2020 due to the cancellation of the minor league season because of the COVID-19 pandemic.

Estrada split the 2021 season between the Single-A Dunedin Blue Jays and High-A Vancouver Canadians, making seven appearances before suffering an elbow injury. He opted for an internal brace procedure rather than Tommy John surgery, allowing him to return to action in 2022, and make nine appearances split between Dunedin and the rookie-level Florida Complex League Blue Jays.

Estrada made 28 appearances (including nine starts) for Dunedin during the 2023 season, registering a 2–3 record and 2.83 ERA with 103 strikeouts and four saves across 76 1/3 innings pitched. He split the 2024 campaign between Dunedin, Vancouver, and the Double-A New Hampshire Fisher Cats. In 22 starts for the three affiliates, Estrada posted a combined 5–9 record and 3.29 ERA with 113 strikeouts across 98 1/3 innings pitched.

On July 4, 2025, Estrada was promoted to the major leagues for the first time. The next day, Estrada made his MLB debut against the Los Angeles Angels. He made two appearances for Toronto during his rookie campaign, struggling to an 8.59 ERA with 10 strikeouts across 7 1/3 innings pitched.

Estrada was optioned to Triple-A Buffalo to begin the 2026 season. He was recalled by Toronto on March 31, 2026. Estrada pitched once for Toronto, throwing four scoreless innings on April 4, before being sent back to Triple-A and later being placed on the injured list. He was transferred to the 60-day injured list on May 28. Estrada was activated by the team on June 20. He made eight total appearances for Toronto, posting a 1–1 record and 5.54 ERA with nine strikeouts and one save across 13 innings pitched. Estrada was designated for assignment by the Blue Jays on August 15. He cleared waivers and was sent outright to Triple–A Buffalo Bisons on August 17.

On November 3, 2026, Estrada re-signed with the Blue Jays on a minor league contract for the 2027 season.

== Personal life ==
Estrada was raised in Mantua, Cuba. His father Federico pitched five seasons in the Cuban National Series for Pinar del Río Province. Several uncles also played baseball, including José Estrada González.
