= Brandon Valenzuela =

Mexican baseball player (born 2000)

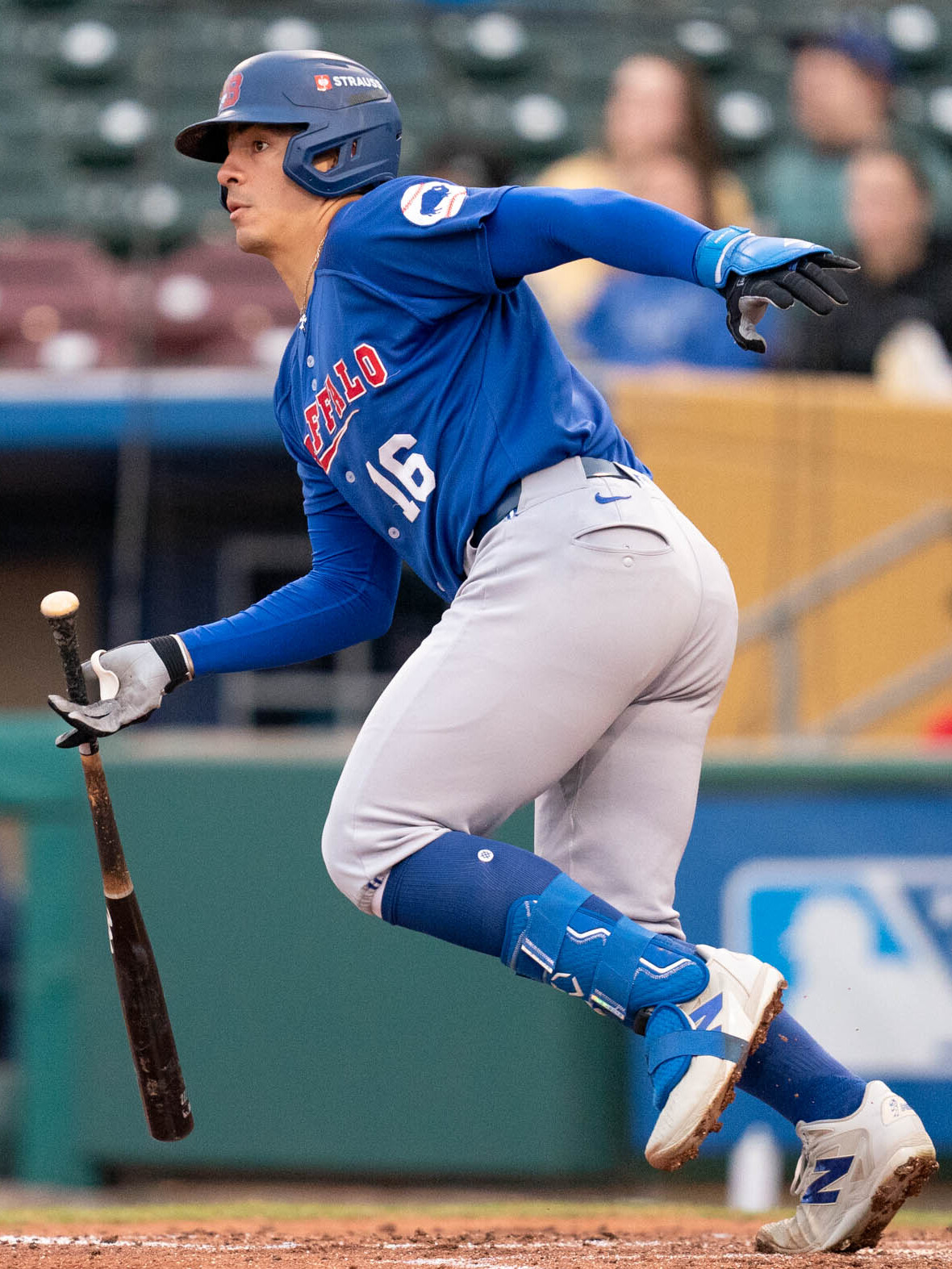
- Valenzuela with the Buffalo Bisons in 2026

Toronto Blue Jays – No. 59
- Catcher
- Born: October 2, 2000 (age 26); Hermosillo, Sonora, Mexico
- Bats: Switch Throws: Right

MLB debut
- April 5, 2026, for the Toronto Blue Jays

MLB statistics (through 2026 season)
- Batting average: .226
- Home runs: 9
- Runs batted in: 24
- Stats at Baseball Reference

Teams
- Toronto Blue Jays (2026–present)

Brandon Ivar Valenzuela (born October 2, 2000) is a Mexican professional baseball catcher for the Toronto Blue Jays of Major League Baseball (MLB). He made his MLB debut in 2026.

== Career ==
=== San Diego Padres ===
Valenzuela signed with the San Diego Padres as an amateur free agent on July 2, 2017. While playing for the San Antonio Missions, he was named the Texas League's player of the month for June 2024.

=== Toronto Blue Jays ===
On July 31, 2025, the Padres traded Valenzuela to the Toronto Blue Jays in exchange for Will Wagner. He made 26 appearances for the Triple-A Buffalo Bisons, batting .207/.295/.370 with three home runs and 12 RBI. On November 6, the Blue Jays added Valenzuela to their 40-man roster to prevent him from reaching minor league free agency.

The Blue Jays optioned Valenzuela to Triple-A Buffalo to begin the 2026 season. On April 4, 2026, Valenzuela was promoted to the major leagues for the first time after Alejandro Kirk was placed on the injured list. He made his major league debut the following day. On April 10, Valenzuela hit his first career major league home run off of Simeon Woods Richardson in a 10–4 win over the Minnesota Twins.
