= José Rodríguez (pitcher, born 2001) =

Mexican baseball player (born 2001)

Toronto Blue Jays – No. 64
- Pitcher
- Born: July 18, 2001 (age 25); Oaxaca, Mexico
- Bats: Switch Throws: Right

MLB debut
- September 18, 2026, for the Toronto Blue Jays

MLB statistics (through 2026 season)
- Win-loss record: 0–0
- Earned run average: 0.00
- Strikeouts: 5
- Stats at Baseball Reference

Teams
- Toronto Blue Jays (2026–present)

José Ignacio Rodríguez (born July 18, 2001) is a Mexican professional baseball pitcher for the Toronto Blue Jays of Major League Baseball (MLB).

== Career ==
=== Los Angeles Dodgers ===
Rodríguez signed with the Los Angeles Dodgers as an amateur free agent on June 13, 2019. Rodríguez did not play in a game in 2020 due to the cancellation of the minor league season because of the COVID-19 pandemic.

Rodríguez made his professional debut in 2021 with the Dominican Summer League Dodgers; he returned to the team in 2022, logging a 5–0 record and 0.47 ERA with 30 strikeouts in 17 games. The Dodgers invited him to spring training as a non-roster player in 2025.

=== Toronto Blue Jays ===
On September 1, 2026, Rodríguez was traded to the Toronto Blue Jays in exchange for Sebastian Rodríguez. On September 18, Rodríguez was selected to the 40–man roster and promoted to the major leagues for the first time.
