= Ricky Tiedemann =

American baseball player (born 2002)

Toronto Blue Jays – No. 33
- Pitcher
- Born: August 18, 2002 (age 24); Long Beach, California, U.S.
- Bats: Left Throws: Left

MLB debut
- August 15, 2026, for the Toronto Blue Jays

MLB statistics (through 2026 season)
- Win–loss record: 0–0
- Earned run average: 1.50
- Strikeouts: 8
- Stats at Baseball Reference

Teams
- Toronto Blue Jays (2026–present)

Tariq Leni "Ricky" Tiedemann (born August 18, 2002) is an American professional baseball pitcher for the Toronto Blue Jays of Major League Baseball (MLB) and Tigres del Licey (Lidom). He made his MLB debut in 2026.

== Career ==
Tiedemann grew up in Long Beach, California and attended Lakewood High School. He committed to play college baseball at San Diego State. Tiedemann was rated by some outlets to be a top-100 prospect in the 2020 Major League Baseball draft but went unselected, reportedly due to his demanding a high signing bonus. He later decommitted from San Diego State and enrolled at Long Beach City College in order be eligible for the 2021 draft. After Long Beach City College cancelled their baseball season due to COVID-19 pandemic Tiedemann transferred to Golden West College, where he posted a 3.55 earned run average (ERA) with 60 strikeouts in 38 innings pitched as a freshman.

Tiedemann was selected in the third round of the 2021 Major League Baseball draft by the Toronto Blue Jays. He entered the 2022 season as the Blue Jays' top-ranked left handed pitching prospect. Tiedemann was assigned to the Dunedin Blue Jays of the Single-A Florida State League at the beginning of the 2022 season. He went 3–0 with a 1.80 ERA, an .800 WHIP, and 49 strikeouts in 30 innings pitched over six starts with Dunedin before being promoted to the Vancouver Canadians of the High-A Northwest League. Tiedemann was selected to play in the 2022 All-Star Futures Game. After the All-Star break, he was promoted a second time to the New Hampshire Fisher Cats of the Double-A Eastern League. Tiedemann was shut down on September 2, after hitting his innings limit for the season. He finished the year with a 5–4 win–loss record, 2.17 ERA, and 117 strikeouts in 78 2/3 innings.

In 2022, Tiedemann was selected by the Tigres del Licey as their sixth pick in the Dominican Winter League’s Rookie Draft.

Tiedemann split the 2023 campaign between the rookie–level Florida Complex League Blue Jays, Dunedin, New Hampshire, and the Triple–A Buffalo Bisons. In 15 starts split between the four affiliates, he compiled an 0–5 record and 3.68 ERA with 82 strikeouts across 44 innings pitched. Tiedemann made 8 starts split between Buffalo, Dunedin, and the FCL Blue Jays in 2024, posting an aggregate 5.19 ERA with 27 strikeouts across 17 1/3 innings pitched. On July 27, 2024, it was announced that Tiedemann would require Tommy John surgery, ending his season.

Tiedemann did not appear during the 2025 season as he continued to rehabilitate from surgery. On November 18, 2025, the Blue Jays added Tiedemann to their 40-man roster to protect him from the Rule 5 draft.

Tiedemann was optioned to Triple-A Buffalo to begin the 2026 season. In seven appearances split between Buffalo, Dunedin, and the FCL Blue Jays, he recorded a 6.43 ERA with 11 strikeouts over seven innings pitched. On August 15, 2026, Tiedemann was promoted to the major leagues for the first time.

== Personal life ==
His elder brother, Tai, was selected by the Texas Rangers in the 2016 draft.
