= Spencer Miles =

American baseball player (born 2000)

Toronto Blue Jays – No. 62
- Pitcher
- Born: July 26, 2000 (age 26); Columbia, Missouri, U.S.
- Bats: Right Throws: Right

MLB debut
- March 28, 2026, for the Toronto Blue Jays

MLB statistics (through 2026 season)
- Win–loss record: 6–2
- Earned run average: 2.63
- Strikeouts: 93
- Stats at Baseball Reference

Teams
- Toronto Blue Jays (2026–present)

Spencer David Miles (born July 26, 2000) is an American professional baseball pitcher for the Toronto Blue Jays of Major League Baseball (MLB). He made his MLB debut in 2026.

== Amateur career ==
Miles attended Rock Bridge High School in Columbia, Missouri, and the University of Missouri, where he was a walk-on for the Missouri Tigers baseball team. In 2021, he played collegiate summer baseball with the Wareham Gatemen of the Cape Cod Baseball League.

== Professional career ==
=== San Francisco Giants ===
The San Francisco Giants selected Miles in the fourth round (136th overall) of the 2022 Major League Baseball draft. He split his first professional season between the rookie-level Arizona Complex League Giants and Single-A San Jose Giants, accumulating a 2-0 record and 3.68 ERA with 12 strikeouts across 7 1/3 innings pitched. Miles missed the 2023 season due to back surgery; after making five appearances for the ACL Giants in 2024, Miles underwent Tommy John surgery in June 2024, ending his season. Miles did not pitch during the 2025 regular season, but the Giants assigned him to the Arizona Fall League.

=== Toronto Blue Jays ===
On December 10, 2025, the Toronto Blue Jays selected Miles from the Giants in the Rule 5 draft. On March 25, 2026, it was announced that Miles made the team's Opening Day roster. He made his MLB debut for the on March 28, striking out one and securing the win for the Blue Jays against the Athletics in extra innings.

In his rookie season, Miles made 49 appearances (8 starts), finishing with a 6–2 record, a 2.73 ERA, and 93 strikeouts across 95 2/3 innings pitched.

== Personal life ==
Miles' older brother, John, played baseball for Missouri from 2012 to 2015.

== See also ==
- Rule 5 draft results
