= John Klein (baseball) =

American baseball player (born 2002)

Toronto Blue Jays – No. 65
- Pitcher
- Born: April 22, 2002 (age 24); Brooklyn Park, Minnesota, U.S.
- Bats: Right Throws: Right

MLB debut
- May 2, 2026, for the Minnesota Twins

MLB statistics (through 2026 season)
- Win–loss record: 0–1
- Earned run average: 2.16
- Strikeouts: 7
- Stats at Baseball Reference

Teams
- Minnesota Twins (2026); Toronto Blue Jays (2026–present)

John Joseph Klein (born April 22, 2002) is an American professional baseball pitcher for the Toronto Blue Jays of Major League Baseball (MLB). He made his MLB debut in 2026 for the Minnesota Twins.

== Career ==
=== Minnesota Twins ===
Klein attended Osseo High School in Osseo, Minnesota, and played college baseball at Iowa Central Community College. He did not start pitching full-time until college. In 2021 and 2022, he played collegiate summer baseball for the Willmar Stingers of the Northwoods League. He signed with the Twins as an undrafted free agent in 2022.

Klein made his professional debut in 2022 with the Florida Complex League Twins. He pitched 2023 with FCL Twins, Fort Myers Mighty Mussels and Cedar Rapids Kernels and all of 2024 with Cedar Rapids. He started 2025 with the Double-A Wichita Wind Surge before being promoted to the Triple-A St. Paul Saints.

On November 18, 2025, the Twins added Klein to their 40-man roster to protect him from the Rule 5 draft. Klein was optioned to Triple-A St. Paul to begin the 2026 season. On May 2, 2026, Klein was promoted to the major leagues for the first time. He made three appearances for Minnesota, posting an 0–1 record and 4.15 ERA with two strikeouts across 4 1/3 innings.

=== Toronto Blue Jays ===
On August 3, 2026, Klein, Dasan Hill, and Dameury Pena were traded to the Toronto Blue Jays in exchange for Jeff Hoffman.
