= Mason Fluharty =

American baseball player (born 2001)

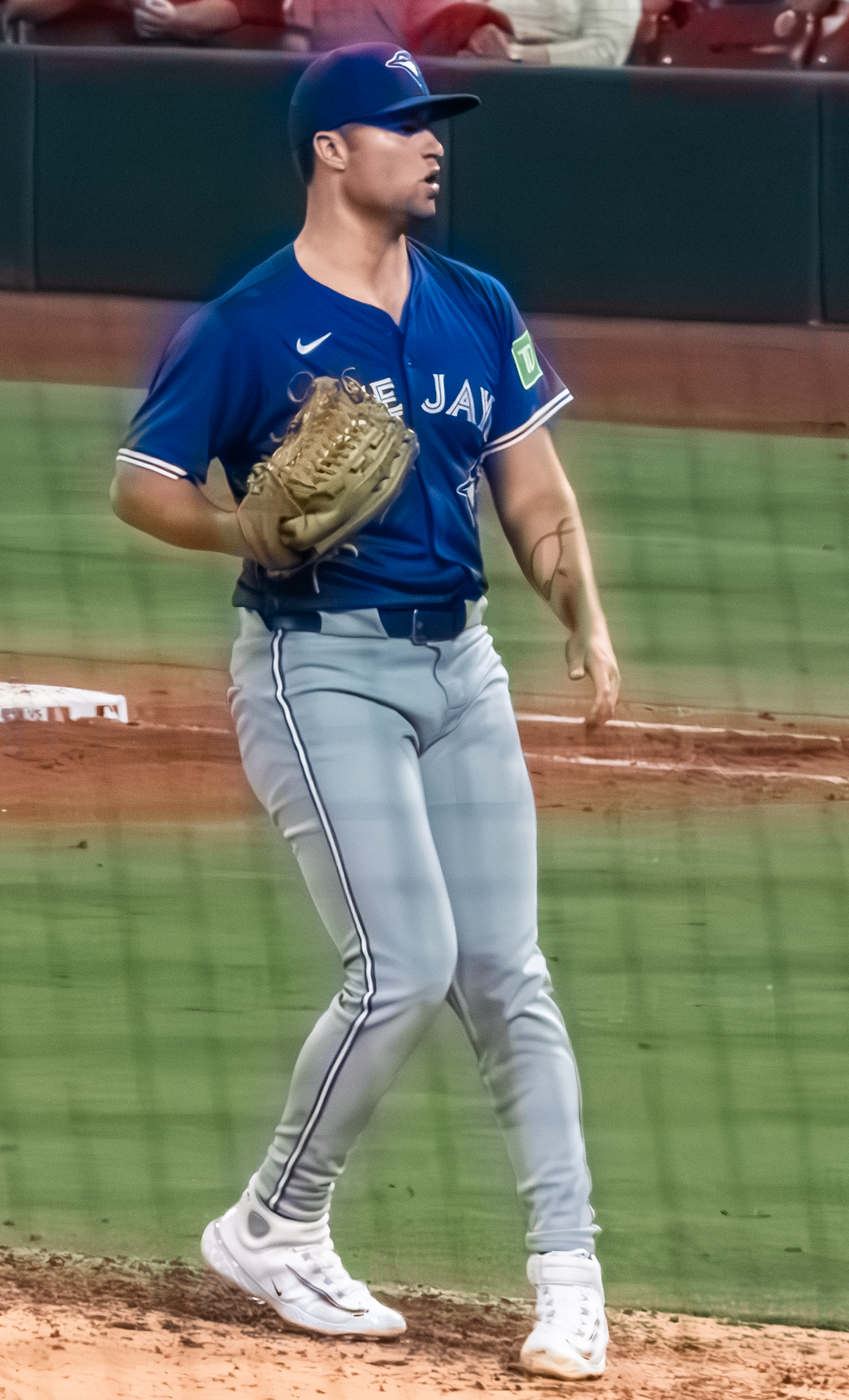
- Fluharty with the Toronto Blue Jays

Toronto Blue Jays – No. 68
- Pitcher
- Born: August 13, 2001 (age 25); Lewes, Delaware, U.S.
- Bats: Right Throws: Left

MLB debut
- April 1, 2025, for the Toronto Blue Jays

MLB statistics (through 2026 season)
- Win–loss record: 12–3
- Earned run average: 3.82
- Strikeouts: 121
- Stats at Baseball Reference

Teams
- Toronto Blue Jays (2025–present)

Mason Lynn Fluharty (born August 13, 2001) is an American professional baseball pitcher for the Toronto Blue Jays of Major League Baseball (MLB). He made his MLB debut in 2025.

== High school and college ==
Fluharty attended Cape Henlopen High School in Lewes, Delaware and played college baseball at Liberty University. In three seasons with the Flames, he appeared in 51 games as a reliever and pitched to a 6–4 win–loss record, 3.47 earned run average (ERA), and 108 strikeouts in 80 1/3 innings.

== Professional career ==
Fluharty was selected by the Toronto Blue Jays in the fifth round of the 2022 Major League Baseball draft. He made his professional debut that year with the High-A Vancouver Canadians, appearing in 10 games with a 1–1 record, 3.52 ERA, and 21 strikeouts in 15 1/3 innings pitched. Fluharty pitched 2023 with Vancouver and was later promoted to the Double-A New Hampshire Fisher Cats. In 48 games split across the two levels, he went 3–5 with a 3.28 ERA and 75 strikeouts in 57 2/3 innings. Fluharty played the entire 2024 campaign with the Triple-A Buffalo Bisons. In a career-high 67 innings across 56 games, he pitched to a 5–4 record, 3.63 ERA, and 76 strikeouts.

On March 30, 2025, Fluharty was selected to the 40-man roster and promoted to the major leagues for the first time. He made his debut the two days later against the Washington Nationals. On April 25, Fluharty recorded his first career win, allowing one run in 2/3 of an inning in a 4–2 victory over the New York Yankees. He notched his first MLB save on August 10 against the Los Angeles Dodgers, striking out Shohei Ohtani and stranding three inherited runners on base to clinch a one-run win for Toronto.
