= Trey Yesavage =

American baseball player (born 2003)

Toronto Blue Jays – No. 39
- Pitcher
- Born: July 28, 2003 (age 23); Pottstown, Pennsylvania, U.S.
- Bats: Right Throws: Right

MLB debut
- September 15, 2025, for the Toronto Blue Jays

MLB statistics (through 2026 season)
- Win–loss record: 6–6
- Earned run average: 3.63
- Strikeouts: 113
- Stats at Baseball Reference

Teams
- Toronto Blue Jays (2025–present)

Trey David Yesavage (/jɛˈsævɪdʒ/ yeh-SAV-ij; born July 28, 2003) is an American professional baseball pitcher for the Toronto Blue Jays of Major League Baseball (MLB). Drafted 20th overall while playing college baseball for the East Carolina Pirates in the 2024 MLB draft, he made his MLB debut in September 2025.

Born in Pottstown and raised in Boyertown, both in Pennsylvania, Yesavage enrolled at East Carolina University to play college baseball. Originally pitching as a relief pitcher for the Pirates, he changed to a starting pitcher in his sophomore season. He was named a first-team All-American and the American Athletic Conference Pitcher of the Year in his junior season at East Carolina, and was drafted 20th overall in the 2024 MLB draft by the Toronto Blue Jays. He advanced through four levels of the Blue Jays' minor league system in 2025 and made his major league debut that September, setting a franchise record for strikeouts in a debut. During the 2025 postseason, he set several Blue Jays and MLB rookie strikeout records, and became the second-youngest pitcher to start Game 1 of the World Series.

== Early life ==
Yesavage was born on July 28, 2003, in Pottstown, Pennsylvania, the oldest of three children of Dave and Cheryl Yesavage. He has two brothers, Cole and Chase. Chase plays lacrosse at Stockton University. He grew up in Boyertown, Pennsylvania, attending Boyertown Area High School.

== College career ==
Yesavage enrolled at East Carolina University to play college baseball for the East Carolina Pirates. He spent his freshman season as a relief pitcher and had a 4.50 earned run average (ERA) over 34 appearances. Over the summer, he joined the Charlottesville Tom Sox of the summer collegiate Valley Baseball League. Utilized as a starting pitcher in his sophomore year, he pitched to a 7–1 win–loss record with a 2.61 ERA and 105 strikeouts. For his performance, he earned All-AAC honors and second-team All-American honors. After the season, Yesavage was selected to play for the Team USA Collegiate National Baseball Team. He was named a preseason first-team All-American entering his junior season. He entered the season as a top starting pitcher improving on his game, pitching a 11–1 win–loss record with a 2.03 ERA and 145 strikeouts, leading him to first-team All-American and All-AAC honors. He was also named American Athletic Conference Pitcher of the Year.

== Professional career ==
=== Minor leagues (2024–25) ===
Considered a top prospect in the 2024 Major League Baseball draft, Yesavage was selected by the Toronto Blue Jays in the first round, with the 20th overall selection. He signed a contract with the Blue Jays on August 1, which included a $4.175 million signing bonus, $760,000 in 2025 base pay, and $820,000 in 2026 base pay.

Yesavage was assigned to the Single-A Dunedin Blue Jays to open the 2025 minor league season. After going 3–0 with a 2.43 ERA and 55 strikeouts in 33 1/3 innings, he was promoted to the High-A Vancouver Canadians on May 16. Yesavage made four starts with the Canadians, recording a 1.56 ERA and 33 strikeouts in 17 1/3 innings before being promoted to the Double-A New Hampshire Fisher Cats on June 12; he also appeared in the All-Star Futures Game. After recording 46 strikeouts in 30 innings with New Hampshire, Yesavage was promoted to the Triple-A Buffalo Bisons on August 11. He made six appearances for Buffalo, pitching to a 3.63 ERA and 26 strikeouts in 17 1/3 innings.

=== Major leagues (2025–present) ===
==== 2025 ====
On September 15, 2025, Yesavage was selected to the 40-man roster and promoted to the major leagues for the first time. He made his major league debut against the Tampa Bay Rays the same day, allowing one run on three hits and striking out nine in five innings. His performance set a new Blue Jays franchise record for most strikeouts in an MLB debut, breaking Trent Thornton's record of eight set in 2019. Yesavage received a no decision in a 2–1 extra-innings victory. He earned his first career win on September 27, also versus the Rays. He ended the regular season with a 1–0 record, a 3.21 ERA, and 16 strikeouts in 3 games. On October 5, Yesavage made his MLB postseason debut as the starting pitcher in game 2 of the American League Division Series (ALDS) against the New York Yankees. In a widely touted showing described by Blue Jays reporter Keegan Matheson as among the "greatest performances in [Blue Jays] history,” he struck out 11 and did not give up a single hit in his 5 1/3 innings pitched. He broke the Blue Jays' franchise record for most strikeouts in a postseason game, with the previous record at 8 being set by David Price, Juan Guzmán, and Dave Stieb. He was also the second-youngest player in MLB history to have 10 or more strikeouts in a postseason game, behind Fernando Valenzuela. The Blue Jays went on to win 13–7.

On October 24, Yesavage started Game 1 of the World Series against the Los Angeles Dodgers, becoming the second-youngest to do so after Ralph Branca in 1947. On October 29 in Game 5, Yesavage pitched seven innings, allowing only one earned run and striking out twelve, a World Series record for a rookie. His performance in the game brought his strikeout count this postseason to 39, another MLB record for a rookie in a single postseason, surpassing a record held by Michael Wacha. He also became the first rookie with multiple 10-strikeout games in a single postseason. He ended the postseason with a 3–1 record, a 3.58 ERA, and 39 strikeouts over 6 games, along with being ranked the top prospect in the Blue Jays organization.

==== 2026 ====
During the offseason, Yesavage planned on adding a curveball to his pitching repertoire, saying that "[he] would love (a pitch) that moves glove side". He was also put on a reduced pitching workload during the offseason and spring training after pitching 139 innings in 2025. On March 19, it was announced that he had a right shoulder impingement and was placed on the injured list to begin the MLB season. Yesavage was sent to Single-A Dunedin for two rehab starts and up to Triple-A Buffalo in early April for another two rehab starts. He made his MLB season debut on April 28 against the Boston Red Sox, throwing 3 strikeouts and 4 hits over 5.1 scoreless innings. Throughout the season, it was noted that Yesavage's command had decreased, pitching 7 walks in 1.2 innings against the San Diego Padres on July 11 and with worsening advanced statistics month-over-month. On August 4 against the Houston Astros, he left the game after two innings due to a knee injury. It was announced the next day as left knee inflammation and he was placed on the 15-day injured list. On August 11, it was announced that Yesavage would require surgery to repair a meniscus injury in his left knee. He threw one rehab start for Triple-A Buffalo, giving up two runs on two hits in 0 2/3 innings. He returned on September 21 against the Baltimore Orioles, pitching 2 innings and giving up a single run. He made 18 starts for Toronto in 2026, compiling a 5–6 record and 3.69 ERA with 97 strikeouts across 97 2/3 innings pitched.

== Pitching profile ==
Yesavage throws a fastball that maxes out at 98 miles per hour (158 km/h) and sits at 93 miles per hour (150 km/h) to 95 miles per hour (153 km/h) while pitching. He complements his fastball with a mid-80s slider and a mid-80s splitter. His splitter imitates a slider with a late sharp horizontal movement. Across all pitchers, he features the highest arm release angle in MLB at 63° along with a high release point at 7.09 feet (2.16 m). His slider features more arm-side movement than any other pitcher in MLB in 2025, with 3.4 inches (8.6 cm) of movement, along with his fastball being tied at fourth with most induced rise, at 19.5 inches (50 cm).

== See also ==
- All-Star Futures Game all-time roster
- List of World Series starting pitchers
