= 2025 World Series =

Major League Baseball's championship series

| Team (Wins) | Managers | Season |
|---|---|---|
| Los Angeles Dodgers (4) | Dave Roberts | 93–69 (.574), GA: 3 |
| Toronto Blue Jays (3) | John Schneider | 94–68 (.580), GA: 0 |
- Dates: October 24 – November 1 (Note: Game 7 concluded past midnight on November 2 local time.)
- Venue(s): Rogers Centre (Toronto); Dodger Stadium (Los Angeles)
- MVP: Yoshinobu Yamamoto (Los Angeles)
- Umpires: Jordan Baker, Adam Hamari, Adrian Johnson, Will Little, Alan Porter, John Tumpane, Mark Wegner (crew chief)

Broadcast
- Television: Fox (United States – English); Fox Deportes (United States – Spanish); Sportsnet (Canada – English); Citytv (Canada – English) (Note: Simulcast of the Fox feed); TVA Sports (Canada – French); NHK (Note: Games 1 and 4 on NHK G and NHK BSP4K Games 2 and 3 in NHK BS All games also streamed on NHK ONE) (Japan – Japanese); MLB International (International – English)
- TV announcers: Joe Davis, John Smoltz, Ken Rosenthal, and Tom Verducci (Fox); Adrián García Márquez, Edgar González, Carlos Álvarez, Jaime Motta, and Michelle Liendo (Fox Deportes); Dan Shulman, Buck Martinez, and Hazel Mae (Sportsnet); Denis Casavant and Karl Gélinas (TVA Sports); Tetsushi Sakanashi and So Taguchi (NHK); Dave Flemming and Ryan Spilborghs (MLB International)
- Radio: ESPN (United States – English); TUDN (United States – Spanish); Sportsnet (Canada – English) (Note: Simulcast of the CJCL feed); CJCL (TOR – English); KLAC (LAD – English); KTNQ (LAD – Spanish)
- Radio announcers: Jon Sciambi, Jessica Mendoza, Eduardo Pérez, and Buster Olney (ESPN); Alberto Ferreiro, Luis Quiñones, Eduardo Sánchez, and Jesús Acosta (TUDN); Ben Shulman and Chris Leroux (Sportsnet, CJCL); Stephen Nelson and Rick Monday (KLAC); Pepe Yñiguez and José Mota (KTNQ)
- ALCS: Toronto Blue Jays over Seattle Mariners (4–3)
- NLCS: Los Angeles Dodgers over Milwaukee Brewers (4–0)

World Series program

The 2025 World Series (branded as the 2025 World Series presented by Capital One) was the championship series of Major League Baseball's (MLB) 2025 season. The 121st edition of the World Series, it was a best-of-seven playoff between the National League (NL) champion and defending World Series champion Los Angeles Dodgers and the American League (AL) champion Toronto Blue Jays. The series was played from October 24 to November 1. The Dodgers defeated the Blue Jays in seven games to win their second consecutive World Series and ninth overall. They became MLB's first franchise to win back-to-back championships since 2000, the first from the NL since 1976, and the eighth overall. Dodgers pitcher Yoshinobu Yamamoto was named the World Series MVP, recording three wins and a 1.02 ERA.

Both teams reached the playoffs by winning their respective divisions; the Dodgers won the National League West for the 12th time in 13 seasons, while the Blue Jays won the American League East for the first time since 2015. In the 2025 postseason, the Dodgers went 9–1 in the NL playoffs, while the Blue Jays earned a first-round bye and went 7–4 in the AL. The Blue Jays made their third World Series appearance, and their first in 32 years, after their back-to-back titles in 1992 and 1993. The Dodgers were favored heading into the Series, but the Blue Jays had home-field advantage due to their better regular-season record.

The series was closely contested throughout between both clubs. In Game 1, the Blue Jays scored nine runs in the sixth inning to win uncontested. The Dodgers responded in Game 2 with a complete game by Yamamoto, who gave up just one run. The 18-inning Game 3 was the second-longest game in World Series history by time; Freddie Freeman hit a walk-off home run for the second World Series in a row. However, the Blue Jays seized control with two straight wins in Los Angeles, as the Dodgers bullpen struggled. Back in Toronto, Yamamoto pitching six innings of one-run ball and a critical base-running mistake by Addison Barger tied the series for the final time to force a deciding game. Game 7 was the sixth World Series Game 7 to go into extra innings. With Toronto two outs away from the title, Miguel Rojas tied the game with a solo home run. Will Smith then hit the go-ahead home run in the eleventh. One day after throwing 96 pitches, Yamamoto pitched the final 2 2/3 innings to clinch the title for Los Angeles.

The series was televised by Fox in the United States and by Sportsnet in Canada. The series averaged 16.1 million viewers in the U.S., making it the most-watched World Series since 2017. Game 7 was the most-watched World Series game since Game 7 in 1991, with at least 51 million viewers across the U.S., Canada, and Japan.

Several commentators have called the 2025 Series one of the greatest World Series of all time, and its Game 7 one of the greatest World Series games of all time. Several World Series records were broken, including the first pinch-hit grand slam (Addison Barger, Game 1); the most times reaching base (9) and the most intentional walks (4) for a player in a game (Shohei Ohtani, Game 3); the most innings pitched (73.0) by a team in a best-of-seven matchup (both teams); and the most innings caught in a single Series (Will Smith). In addition, Ernie Clement set the record for the most hits for a player in a single postseason (30). Following the series, several sports outlets hailed the Dodgers as a dynasty.

== Background ==
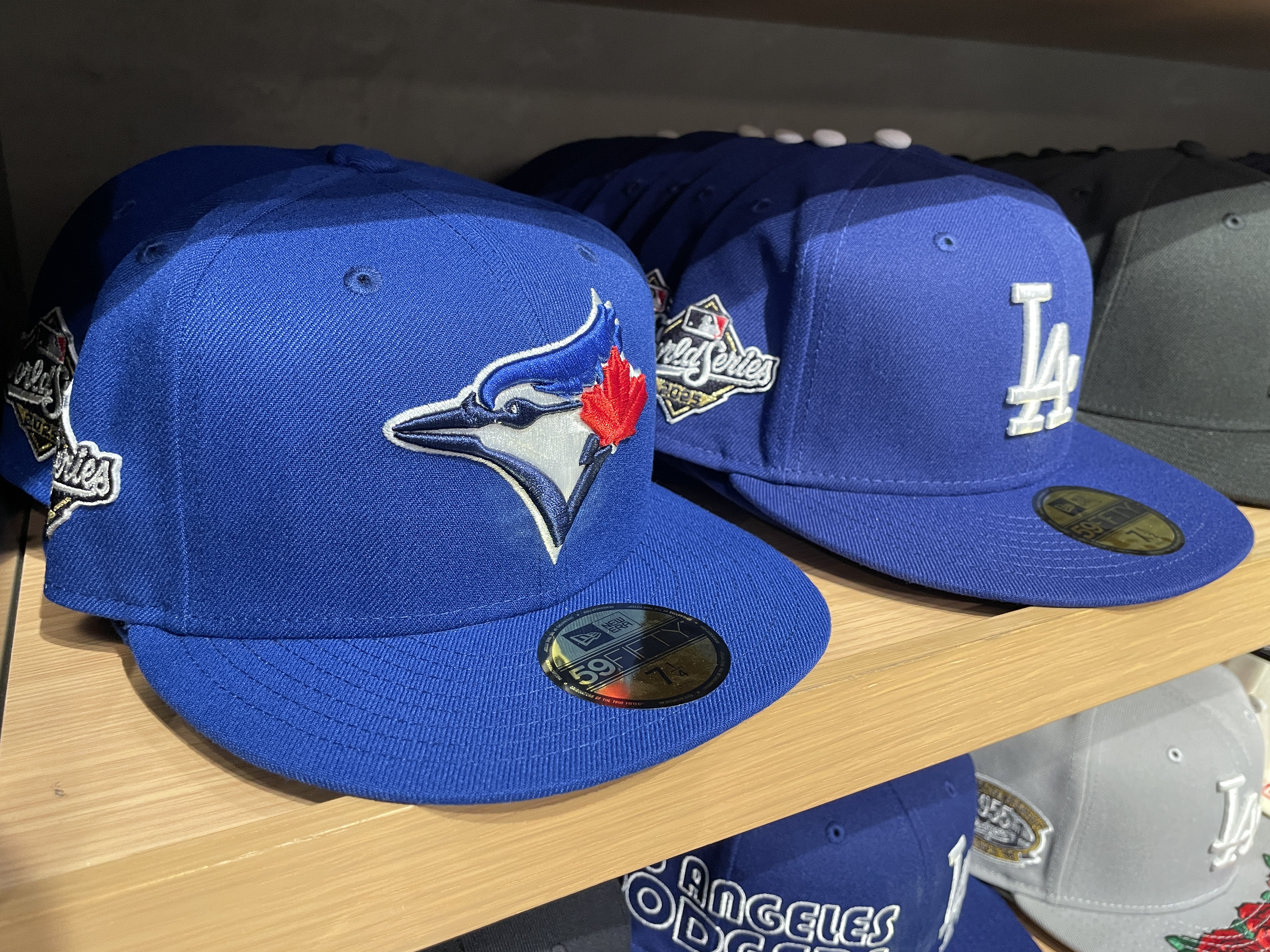
Blue Jays and Dodgers caps with World Series patches

The 2025 World Series logo returned to the classic, scripted white "World Series" wordmark in cursive, similar to the one used across 14 consecutive World Series logos from 1987 to 2000. This was the ninth consecutive World Series to take place in either California or Texas. This was the fifth World Series since the League Championship Series (LCS) round became best-of-seven in 1985 that one LCS was a sweep and the other went seven games, with the seven-game-winning LCS team winning the previous four World Series.

The Dodgers won two games out of three against the Blue Jays in a three-game series at Dodger Stadium from August 8–10. The third game of this series would have an impact on the World Series, as the Dodgers blew a late-game lead in the eighth and a tie in the ninth; had they won that game, and the rest of the season played out the same, the Dodgers would have had home field advantage in the World Series instead of Toronto, who would have finished second in the AL East behind the Yankees and would have had a tougher road through the postseason. This World Series marked the first postseason meeting between the Blue Jays and the Dodgers. It also marked the first meeting between teams from Toronto and Los Angeles in a postseason series since the 1993 Stanley Cup playoffs, in which the Los Angeles Kings defeated the Toronto Maple Leafs in seven games in the Campbell (Western) Conference Final to reach the Stanley Cup Final for the first time in franchise history.

Dodgers’ and Blue Jays’ relievers wrote “51” on their hats in honor of Dodgers’ reliever Alex Vesia, who was away from the team during the World Series to allow him and his wife, Kayla, time to "navigate a deeply personal family matter," according to a team statement. It was later announced by Vesia on social media that the couple's newborn daughter had died on October 26.

=== Los Angeles Dodgers ===
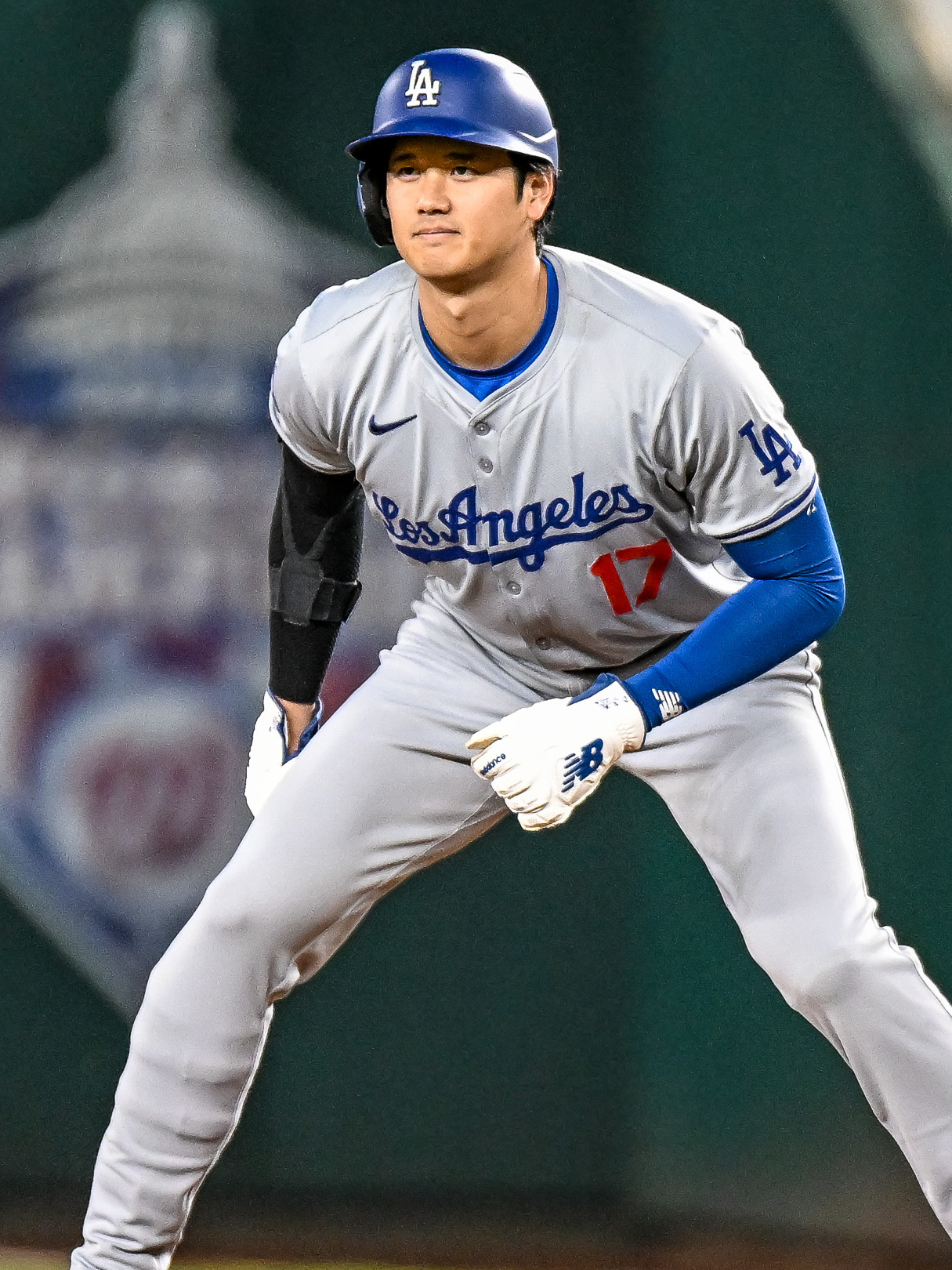
Two-way player Shohei Ohtani won the 2025 NLCS MVP with a three-home-run, six-inning, ten-strikeout, zero-runs-allowed performance in Game 4.

The Dodgers solidified their championship roster from the previous season by adding free agents starting pitcher Blake Snell, reliever Tanner Scott, and winning the bid to sign Japanese phenom Roki Sasaki, while also re-signing Teoscar Hernández and Blake Treinen. As heavy favorites to repeat, the Dodgers became the first defending World Series champion to begin their season 8–0, besting the previous record held by the 1933 Yankees, who started their season 7–0. The Dodgers had a 56–32 record with a nine-game lead in the National League West on July 3. However, from July 4 through September 6, the Dodgers experienced their worst 54-game stretch (22–32) of Dave Roberts' tenure as team manager (2016–present). During this stretch, they temporarily lost their division lead to the San Diego Padres. At the heart of their struggles was an unreliable bullpen, including hitting rock bottom on a September 6 walk-off loss to Baltimore where Yoshinobu Yamamoto did not allow a hit for 8 2/3 innings. The bullpen could not get the final out and ended up blowing a 3–0 lead. They rebounded towards the end of the season, winning five of their last six regular season series, posting a 93–69 record and winning the NL West division for the fourth consecutive season and the 12th time in the last 13 seasons (2013–2020, 2022–2025). At the All-Star game, Freddie Freeman, Shohei Ohtani, and Will Smith were fan-voted starters, while Yamamoto was an MLB selection, and Clayton Kershaw, playing in his last season, was the "legend pick".

As the third-best division winner by record, the Dodgers hosted and swept the sixth-seeded Cincinnati Reds in the Wild Card Series in two games. They then defeated the second-seeded Philadelphia Phillies in four games in the National League Division Series, highlighted by an errant throw by Orion Kerkering that gave the Dodgers the series walk-off win. In the National League Championship Series, they dispatched the postseason's overall top seed in the Milwaukee Brewers in a four-game sweep. They allowed just four runs in the series and it was their first sweep in a seven-game series since sweeping the New York Yankees in the 1963 World Series. After hitting three home runs and pitching six shutout innings with ten strikeouts in the decisive Game 4 of the NLCS, Ohtani won the NLCS MVP Award. Unlike the 2024 team, which was reliant on relief pitching, the 2025 Dodgers' team strength was their starting pitchers, due to the signing of Snell, a return to pitching from two-way superstar Ohtani, a healthy second half of the season from Tyler Glasnow (who was absent from the team's playoff run the previous year due to an elbow injury), and a full season of Yoshinobu Yamamoto; providing depth were also Emmet Sheehan and Clayton Kershaw, both of whom were productive throughout the season. Throughout the postseason, the starting staff pitched into the sixth inning in every start but one and did not allow more than three earned runs. The Dodgers entered the World Series winners of 24 of their previous 30 games (regular season and playoffs).

This was the Dodgers' 23rd World Series appearance and the fifth in nine seasons (2017, 2018, 2020, 2024, 2025). They were the first reigning World Series champion to reach the World Series since the 2009 Phillies and were looking to become the first repeat champions since the 1998–2000 Yankees, as well as the first in the National League to repeat since the 1975–1976 Reds.

=== Toronto Blue Jays ===
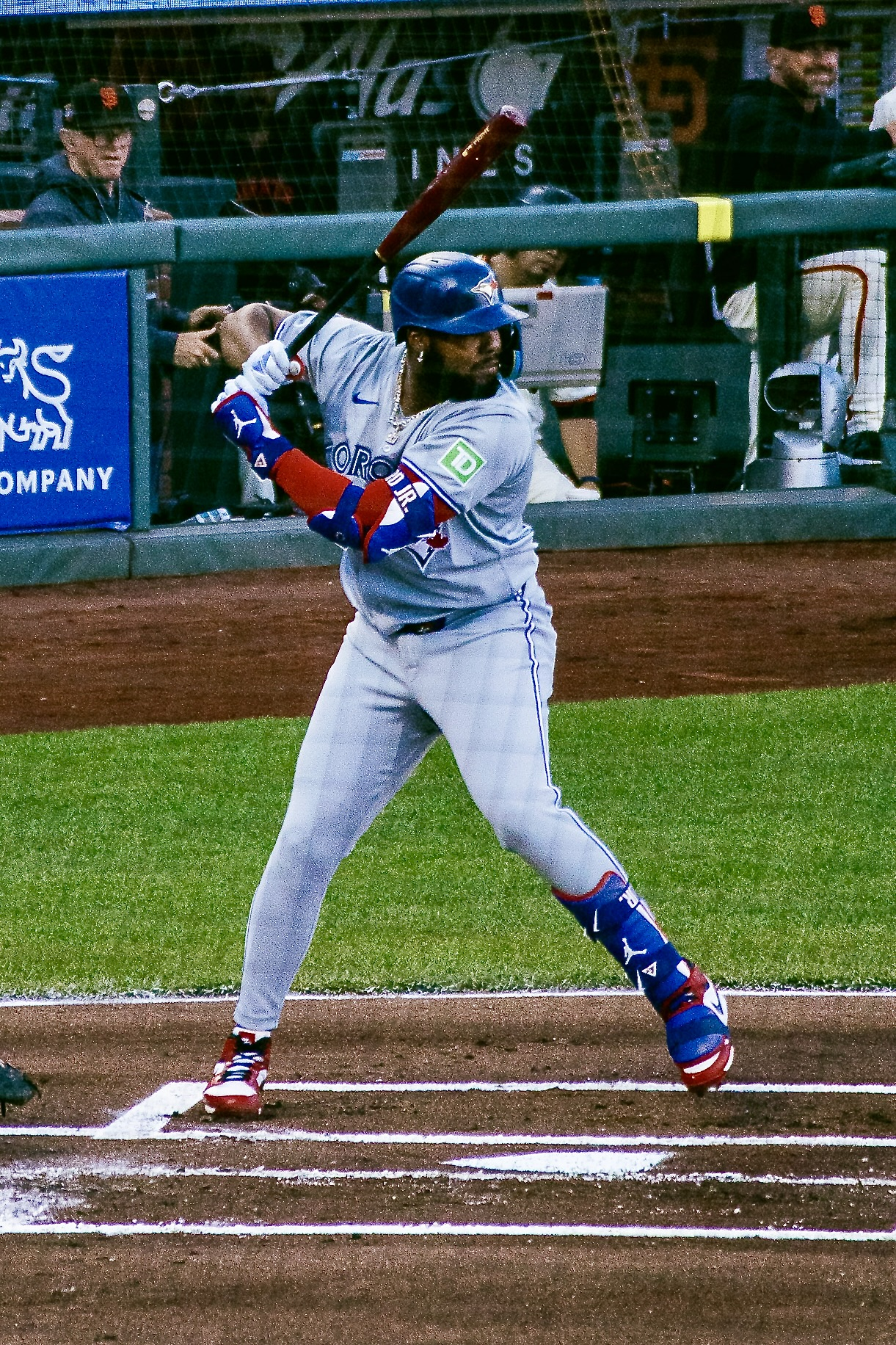
Vladimir Guerrero Jr., the 2025 ALCS MVP, hit six home runs prior to the World Series this postseason.

The Blue Jays opened 2025 looking to improve on their dismal 2024 last-place season, which had been their first losing season since 2019. In the off-season, their most significant signing was not a player acquisition, but the hiring of new hitting coach David Popkins. Popkins's tailored each player's approach to their natural strengths, and put more emphasize on putting the ball in play; under Popkins, virtually every hitter from the 2024 team improved their numbers. The other significant signing happened in April, when the team extended star player Vladimir Guerrero Jr., who was set to become a free agent at season's end, to a 14-year, $500 million contract. The Blue Jays started the season .500 over the first two months. They did not sustain success until June, when they won eight of ten games to start the month. From June 29 through July 9, they won ten straight games, including a four-game sweep of the New York Yankees at the Rogers Centre on Canada Day weekend. Their sudden hot play, coupled with a Yankees' swoon, saw the Blue Jays take the lead in the American League East on July 3, a division they had once trailed by eight games in late May. At the 2025 All-Star game, Guerrero Jr. was named a starter, and catcher Alejandro Kirk was selected as a reserve. After the All-Star break, the Blue Jays won eight of nine games, further expanding their lead in the AL East over New York. An injury to Bo Bichette and a late September surge from the Yankees threatened Toronto's AL East lead, but they defeated the Tampa Bay Rays on the last day of the season, securing their first AL East division title since 2015. The Blue Jays and Yankees finished tied, but by virtue of their 8–5 regular season head-to-head record against New York, Toronto won the division.

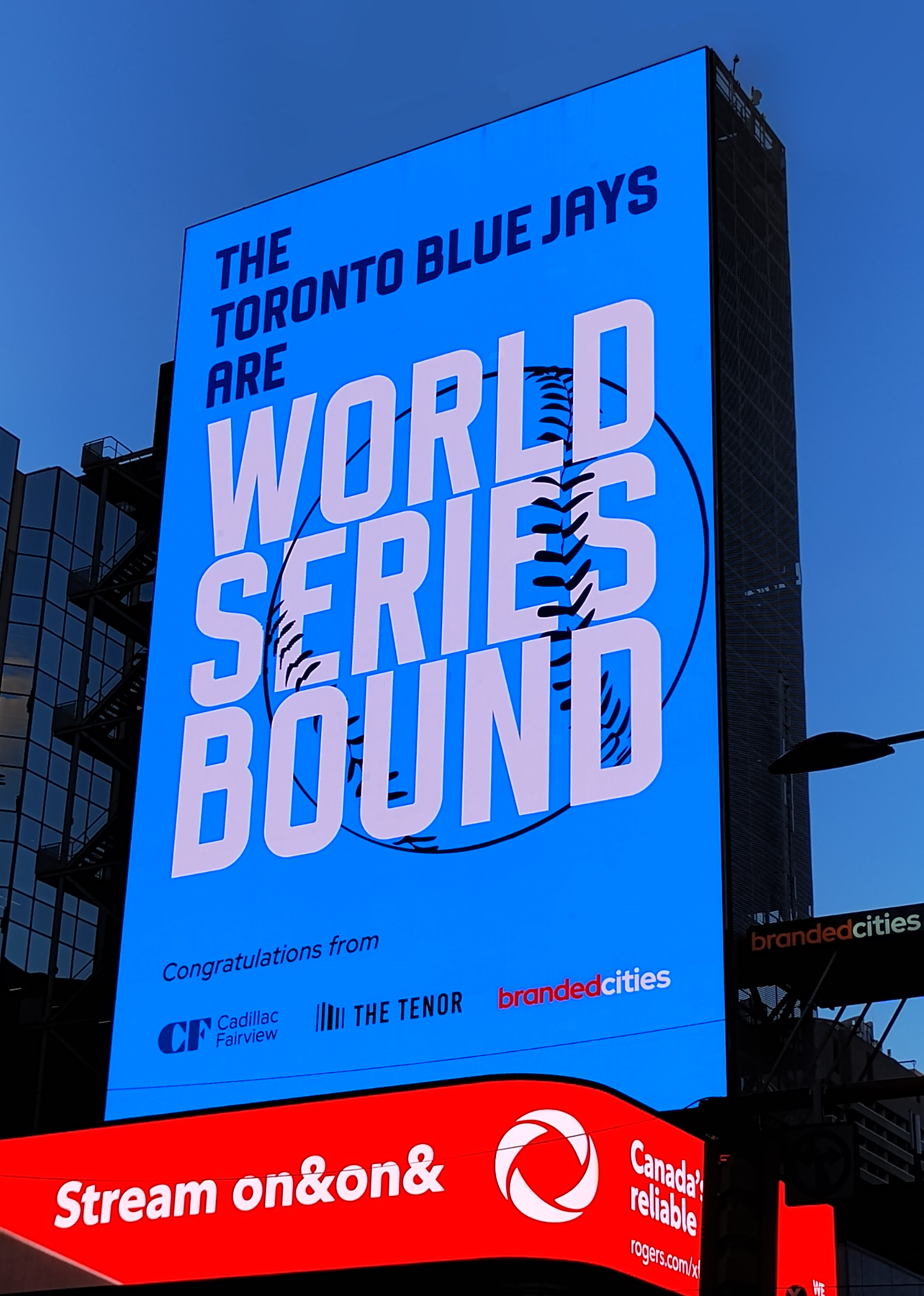
Video billboard ad in Toronto's Sankofa Square congratulating the Blue Jays for reaching the World Series after defeating the Seattle Mariners in the ALCS.

With a division title won, the Blue Jays also earned a first-round bye and the top seed in the American League. In the American League Division Series, they met the fourth-seeded Yankees for the first postseason matchup between the division rivals, where they won the series in four games. Their Game 1 win ended a six-game postseason losing streak and Guerrero Jr. hit the team's first ever postseason grand slam in a blowout Game 2 win. In the American League Championship Series, they came back from a two-games-to-none series deficit against the second-seeded Seattle Mariners in seven games after being eight outs away from elimination in Game 7, highlighted by a seventh inning George Springer go-ahead three-run home run, to reach the World Series for the first time since their 1993 championship season. Guerrero Jr. won the ALCS MVP, as he altogether in the postseason had more home runs (six) than strikeouts (three). As a team, the Blue Jays slugged 0.523 in 11 games prior to the World Series.

Blue Jays' bench coach Don Mattingly, the manager for the Dodgers from 2011 to 2015 and bench coach from 2008 to 2010, reached his first World Series after 34 years in Major League Baseball.

The Blue Jays won their previous two World Series, in 1992 and 1993. They were looking to win their third World Series title and Toronto's first championship in one of the "Big Four" North American professional sports leagues since the Toronto Raptors won the 2019 NBA Finals, as well as their first under current manager John Schneider. The Raptors and Toronto Maple Leafs changed the times of some of their games to avoid conflict with the World Series.

== Summary ==
Los Angeles won the series, 4–3.

| Game | Date | Score | Location | Time | Attendance |
|---|---|---|---|---|---|
| 1 | October 24 | Los Angeles Dodgers – 4, Toronto Blue Jays – 11 | Rogers Centre | 3:13 | 44,353 |
| 2 | October 25 | Los Angeles Dodgers – 5, Toronto Blue Jays – 1 | Rogers Centre | 2:36 | 44,607 |
| 3 | October 27 | Toronto Blue Jays – 5, Los Angeles Dodgers – 6 (18) | Dodger Stadium | 6:39 | 52,654 |
| 4 | October 28 | Toronto Blue Jays – 6, Los Angeles Dodgers – 2 | Dodger Stadium | 2:54 | 52,552 |
| 5 | October 29 | Toronto Blue Jays – 6, Los Angeles Dodgers – 1 | Dodger Stadium | 3:02 | 52,175 |
| 6 | October 31 | Los Angeles Dodgers – 3, Toronto Blue Jays – 1 | Rogers Centre | 3:02 | 44,710 |
| 7 | November 1 | Los Angeles Dodgers – 5, Toronto Blue Jays – 4 (11) | Rogers Centre | 4:07 | 44,713 |

== Matchups ==
=== Game 1 ===
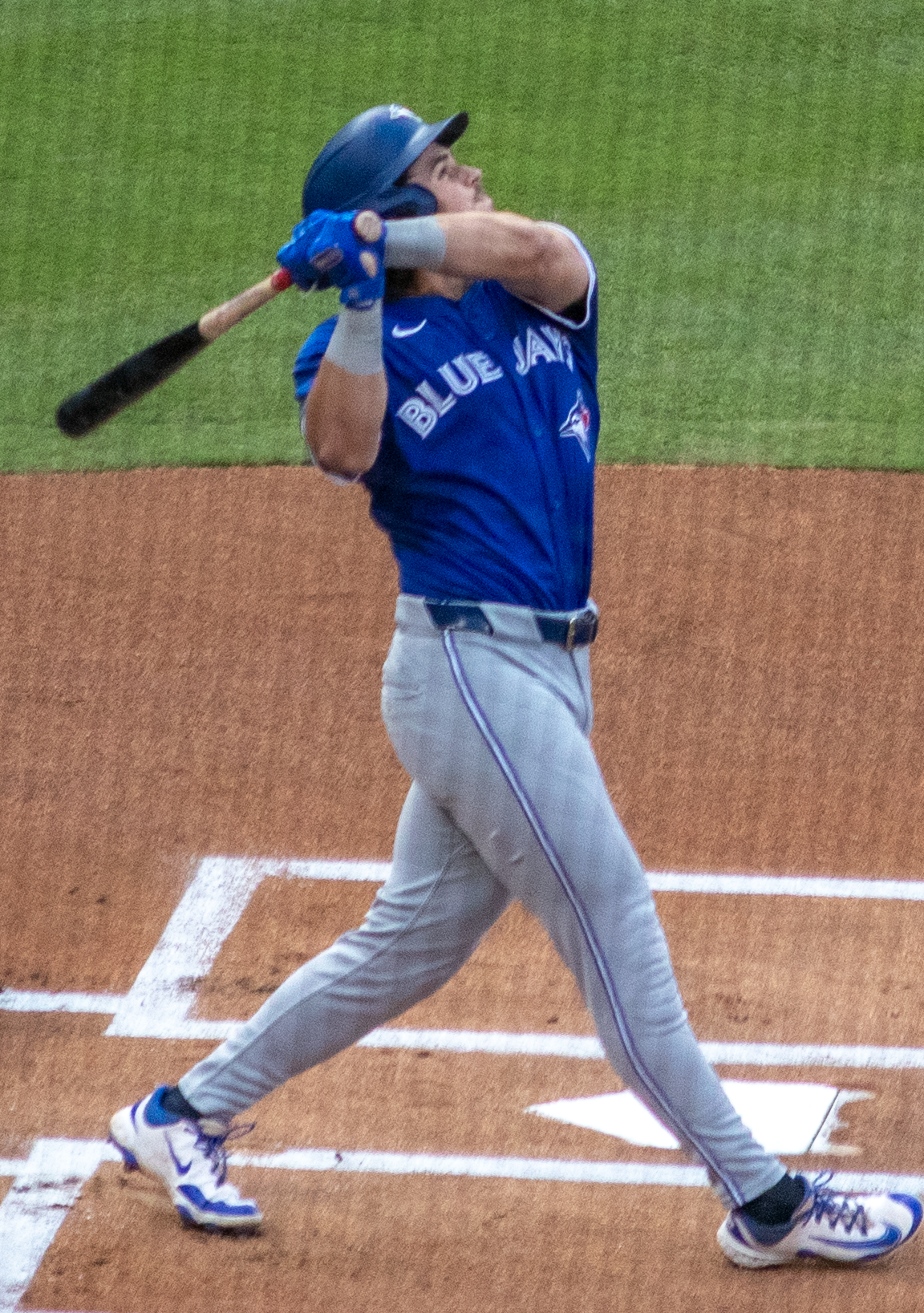
Addison Barger hit a grand slam as a pinch hitter in Game 1

October 24, 2025 8:14 pm (EDT) at Rogers Centre in Toronto, Ontario 68 °F (20 °C), Roof Closed
| Team | 1 | 2 | 3 | 4 | 5 | 6 | 7 | 8 | 9 | R | H | E |
|---|---|---|---|---|---|---|---|---|---|---|---|---|
| Los Angeles | 0 | 1 | 1 | 0 | 0 | 0 | 2 | 0 | 0 | 4 | 6 | 0 |
| Toronto | 0 | 0 | 0 | 2 | 0 | 9 | 0 | 0 | X | 11 | 14 | 0 |
WP: Seranthony Domínguez (1–0) LP: Blake Snell (0–1); Home runs: LAD: Shohei Ohtani (1); TOR: Daulton Varsho (1), Addison Barger (1), Alejandro Kirk (1); Attendance: 44,353; Boxscore

Game 1 featured starters Blake Snell for the Dodgers and Trey Yesavage for the Blue Jays. Singer and musician Pharrell Williams performed prior to the game while gospel choir Voices of Fire sang the American and Canadian national anthems accompanied by the Color of Noise Orchestra and also performed with Williams. Cito Gaston, the manager of the 1992 and 1993 World Series champions, threw the ceremonial first pitch. Bo Bichette, the Blue Jays' starting shortstop who last played on September 6, returned to the lineup as the second baseman, his first MLB appearance at the position.

After Snell retired the first two Blue Jays, Vladimir Guerrero Jr, Bo Bichette, and Alejandro Kirk proceeded to load the bases before Daulton Varsho flied out to end the short-lived threat. In the top of the second inning, Yesavage allowed two runners to reach before Enrique Hernández's single scored Teoscar Hernández and gave the Dodgers a 1–0 lead. A Tommy Edman infield single proceeded to load the bases with just one out, but Yesavage managed to escape the jam, ending with a Shohei Ohtani groundout. In the bottom half of the inning, a base-running mistake led to an inning-ending 1–3–5 putout on Ernie Clement. After Springer hit a ground ball that Snell could not convert into a force at first, he then threw to third base, where Clement was tagged out. In the third, Yesavage walked Mookie Betts and Freddie Freeman to lead off the inning before Will Smith's single scored Betts to make the score 2–0. However, Freeman was thrown out trying to advance to third, which helped Yesavage get out of the inning with just the one run allowed. In the bottom of the fourth inning, Daulton Varsho hit a two-run home run to tie the game 2–2 after Kirk led off with a single. Yesavage's outing ended after pitching four innings, allowing four hits, two runs, and walking three batters while striking out five.

In the bottom of the sixth inning, Bichette led off with a walk, Kirk singled, and Varsho was hit by a pitch. The Dodgers then turned to their bullpen in Emmet Sheehan, but Ernie Clement's single scored Isiah Kiner-Falefa (pinch-running for Bichette) to take a 3–2 lead. Nathan Lukes then drew a walk, scoring Kirk, and Andrés Giménez singled to extend the lead to three. Anthony Banda was then brought in to deal with the top of the order after George Springer grounded into a fielder's choice, but pinch hitter Addison Barger hit a grand slam, giving the Jays a 9–2 lead. Kirk then hit a two-run home run to center field to increase the lead to 11–2. Barger's slam was the first pinch-hit grand slam in World Series history, part of a nine-run inning for the home team, one shy of the World Series record for runs in an inning.

In the top of the seventh inning, Shohei Ohtani hit a two-run home run to right field to cut the Blue Jays' lead to 11–4, joining Hideki Matsui (2003) as the only Japanese-born players to hit a home run in a World Series. Blue Jays pitcher Eric Lauer finished the game by striking out Betts as the Jays took Game 1. Blue Jays' fans chanted “we don’t need you” at Ohtani late in the game, as this was a reference to the Blue Jays near signing of Ohtani during the 2023-24 off-season.

=== Game 2 ===
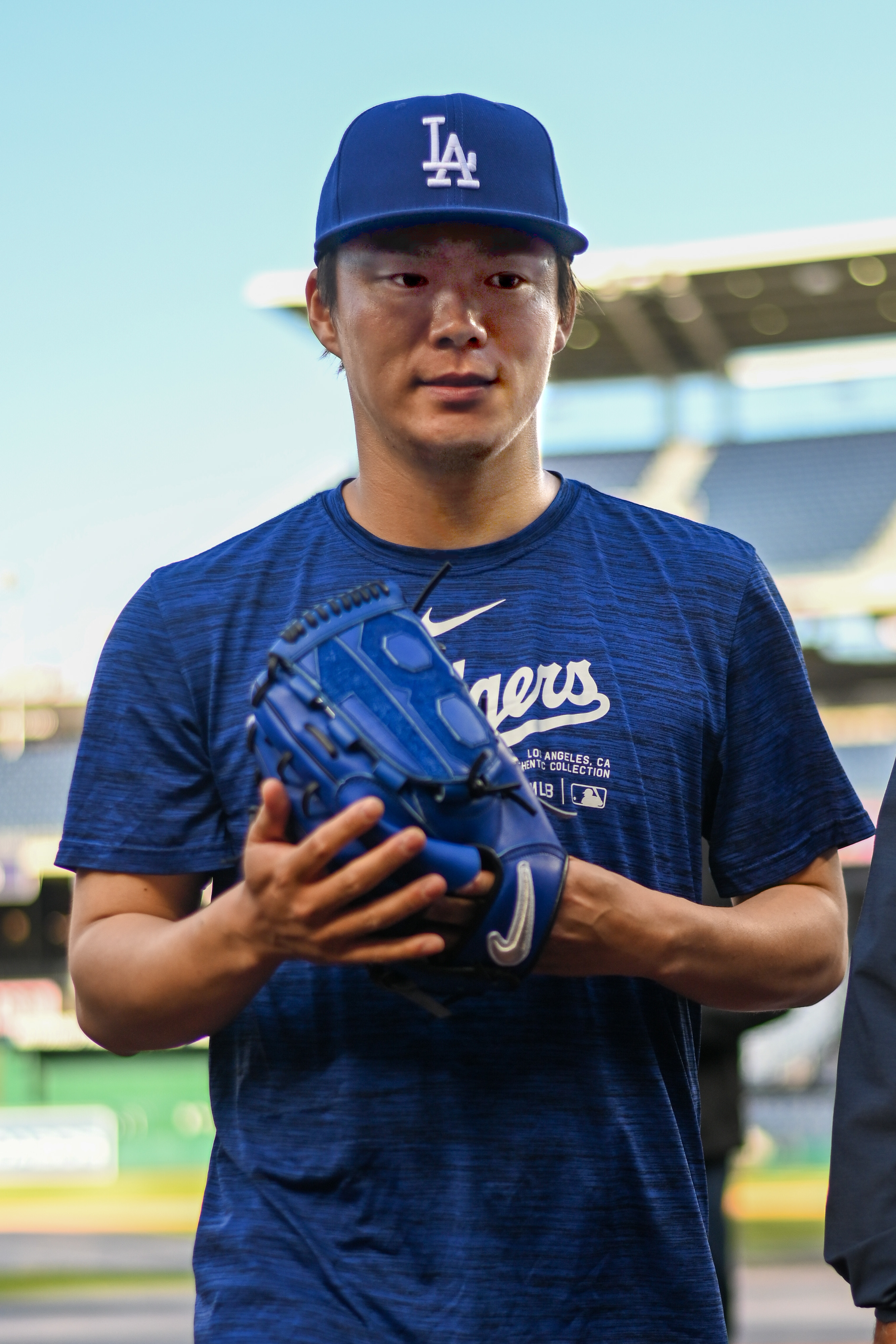
Yoshinobu Yamamoto threw a complete game in Game 2.

October 25, 2025 8:09 pm (EDT) at Rogers Centre in Toronto, Ontario 68 °F (20 °C), Roof Closed
| Team | 1 | 2 | 3 | 4 | 5 | 6 | 7 | 8 | 9 | R | H | E |
|---|---|---|---|---|---|---|---|---|---|---|---|---|
| Los Angeles | 1 | 0 | 0 | 0 | 0 | 0 | 2 | 2 | 0 | 5 | 6 | 0 |
| Toronto | 0 | 0 | 1 | 0 | 0 | 0 | 0 | 0 | 0 | 1 | 4 | 0 |
WP: Yoshinobu Yamamoto (1–0) LP: Kevin Gausman (0–1); Home runs: LAD: Will Smith (1), Max Muncy (1); TOR: None; Attendance: 44,607; Boxscore

Bebe Rexha sang the American national anthem while Alessia Cara sang the Canadian national anthem. Joe Carter, who hit a walk-off home run to win the 1993 World Series for the Blue Jays, threw out the ceremonial first pitch. Pop-rock trio and 2025 Stand Up to Cancer ambassadors the Jonas Brothers performed their song "I Can't Lose" after the fifth inning, with the performance receiving backlash from MLB fans for delaying the middle of the game.

Game 2 featured starters Yoshinobu Yamamoto for the Dodgers and Kevin Gausman for the Blue Jays. The Blue Jays' Bo Bichette was ruled out for Game 2 as he continued to recover from a left knee injury. Isiah Kiner-Falefa took his place at second base and was placed eighth in the batting order. The Dodgers scored in the top of the first inning with a double by Freddie Freeman followed by an RBI single by Will Smith to take a 1–0 lead. The Blue Jays tied the game in the bottom of the third inning on a single by George Springer, a single by Vladimir Guerrero Jr. that moved Springer to third base, and then a sacrifice fly by Alejandro Kirk that scored Springer. In the top of the seventh inning, Smith and Max Muncy hit solo home runs to give the Dodgers a 3–1 lead. Gausman pitched 6 2/3 innings, allowing four hits and three runs while striking out six batters. In the top of the eighth inning, Blue Jays closer Jeff Hoffman threw a wild pitch, scoring Andy Pages and extending the Dodgers' lead to 4–1. Smith then grounded into a force-out to score Shohei Ohtani and extend the Dodgers' lead to 5–1. Yamamoto pitched a one-run complete game to even the series, 1–1, becoming the first pitcher to throw a World Series complete game since Johnny Cueto in 2015, as well as the first to throw multiple complete games in the same postseason since Madison Bumgarner in 2014 and the first to do so in back-to-back games since Curt Schilling in 2001.

=== Game 3 ===
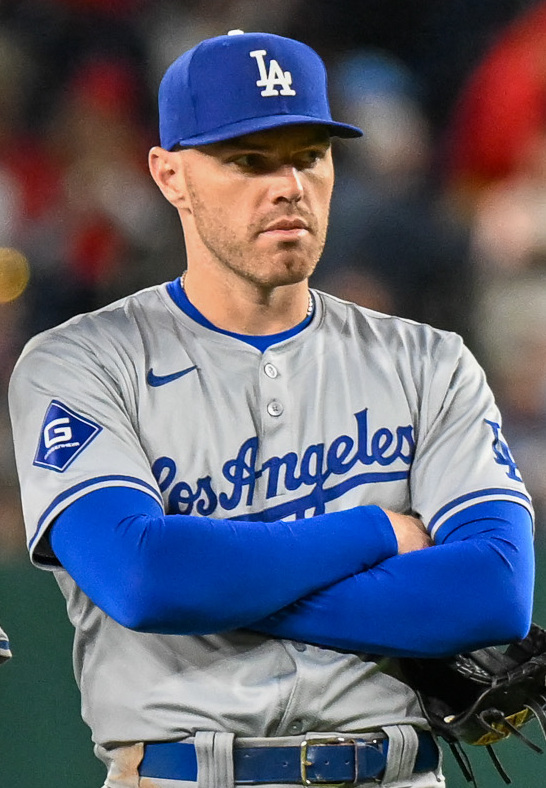
Freddie Freeman was the first player to hit walk-off home runs in consecutive World Series.

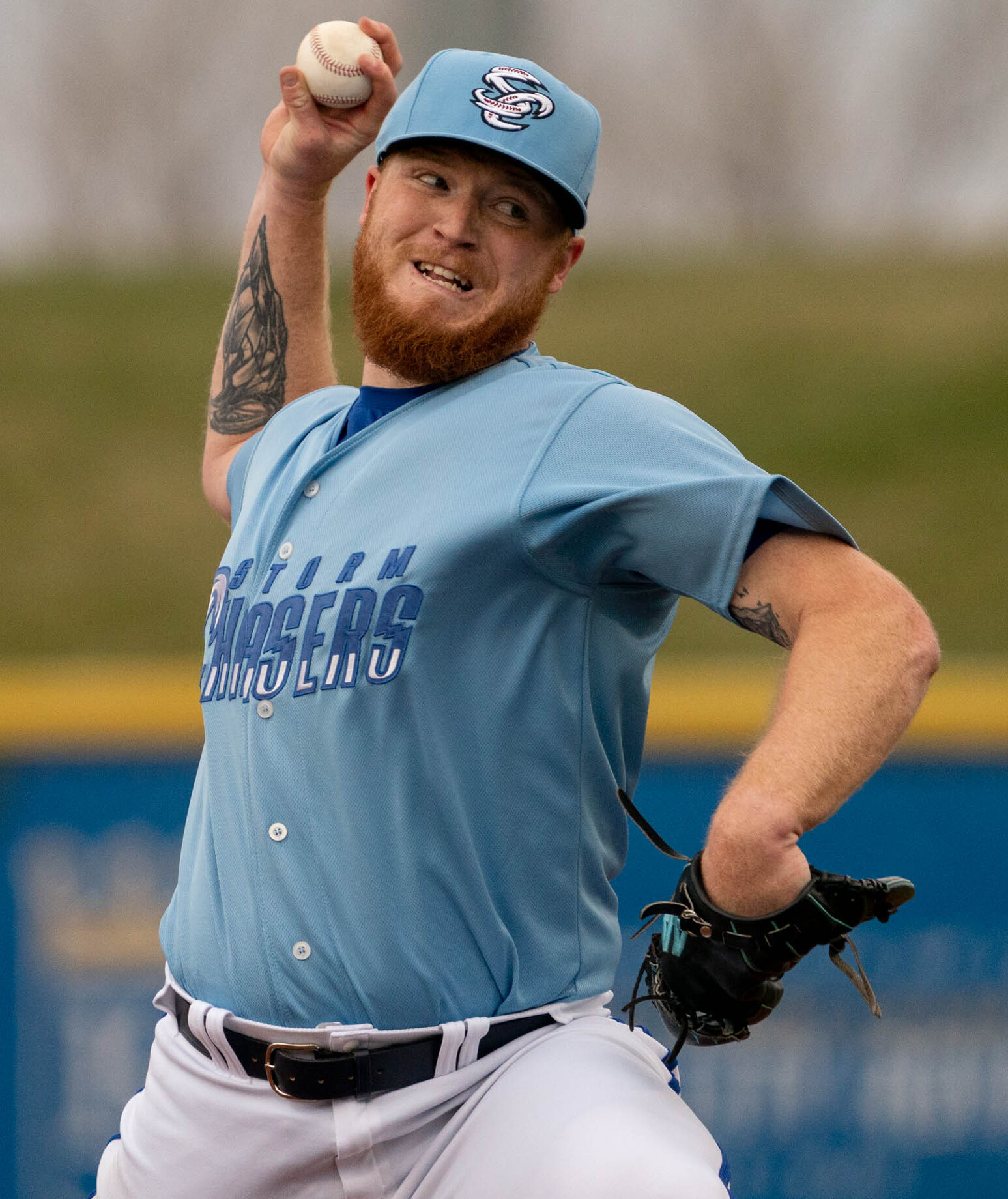
Will Klein, the last man left in the Dodgers' bullpen, pitched four scoreless innings in relief.

October 27, 2025 5:11 pm (PDT) at Dodger Stadium in Los Angeles, California 71 °F (22 °C), Clear
| Team | 1 | 2 | 3 | 4 | 5 | 6 | 7 | 8 | 9 | 10 | 11 | 12 | 13 | 14 | 15 | 16 | 17 | 18 | R | H | E |
|---|---|---|---|---|---|---|---|---|---|---|---|---|---|---|---|---|---|---|---|---|---|
| Toronto | 0 | 0 | 0 | 4 | 0 | 0 | 1 | 0 | 0 | 0 | 0 | 0 | 0 | 0 | 0 | 0 | 0 | 0 | 5 | 15 | 0 |
| Los Angeles | 0 | 1 | 1 | 0 | 2 | 0 | 1 | 0 | 0 | 0 | 0 | 0 | 0 | 0 | 0 | 0 | 0 | 1 | 6 | 16 | 2 |
WP: Will Klein (1–0) LP: Brendon Little (0–1); Home runs: TOR: Alejandro Kirk (2); LAD: Teoscar Hernández (1), Shohei Ohtani 2 (3), Freddie Freeman (1); Attendance: 52,654; Boxscore

External videos
- Game 3 full replay on the MLB's official YouTube channel

Singer-songwriter JP Saxe sang the Canadian national anthem while country singer Brad Paisley sang the United States national anthem. Coincidentally, Paisley also sang the national anthem for the 18-inning World Series game in 2018. Hideo Nomo threw out the ceremonial first pitch. Max Scherzer started Game 3 for the Blue Jays while Tyler Glasnow started for the Dodgers. Scherzer was the first pitcher ever to start a World Series game for four different teams.

In the top of the second inning, Bo Bichette was picked off at first base when a pitch that missed the strike zone and appeared to be ball four was called a strike anyway. In the bottom of the second inning, the Dodgers scored first with a solo home run by Teoscar Hernández. In the bottom of the third inning, Shohei Ohtani homered to extend the lead to 2–0. In the top of the fourth inning, Alejandro Kirk hit a three-run home run to take a 3–2 lead for the Blue Jays. Andrés Giménez then hit a sacrifice fly to center field, extending the lead to 4–2. Glasnow pitched 4 2/3 innings, allowing five hits, four runs, and walking only one batter while striking out five. Scherzer pitched 4 1/3 innings, allowing five hits, two runs, and walking only one batter while striking out three. Facing Mason Fluharty in the fifth inning, Ohtani hit an RBI double and scored on a single by Freddie Freeman to tie the game at 4–4. A ground ball hit by Bo Bichette in the top of the seventh inning ricocheted away from Teoscar Hernandez, allowing Vladimir Guerrero Jr. to score from first base, retaking a 5–4 lead. In the bottom of the seventh inning, Ohtani hit his second home run to tie the game at 5–5, becoming just the second Major League player (and the first since Frank Isbell in Game 5 of the 1906 World Series) to get four extra-base hits in a single postseason game. Roki Sasaki got out of a jam in the top of the eighth inning by getting Nathan Lukes to ground out to first base. In the top of the tenth inning, Ty France hit a two-out single against the Dodgers' Emmet Sheehan, but Davis Schneider, who pinch-ran for France, was subsequently thrown out at home plate after trying to score on Lukes' double. In the top of the 12th inning, after Sheehan loaded the bases, Clayton Kershaw came in and escaped a two-out, bases-loaded jam to keep the game tied, which would ultimately turn out to be his last career appearance.

In the bottom of the 13th inning, after Eric Lauer loaded the bases with two outs by intentionally walking Ohtani and Betts, Lauer escaped a bases-loaded jam when Freeman flied out to center fielder Daulton Varsho. Neither team scored until Freddie Freeman hit a walk-off home run off Brendon Little leading off the bottom of the 18th inning for the Dodgers to take Game 3 and a 2–1 series lead. Freeman's home run was a mirror to Max Muncy's in Game 3 of the 2018 World Series, which also went 18 innings. With his walk-off home run, Freeman became the first player to accomplish this feat in consecutive World Series, after his grand-slam walk-off in Game 1 of the 2024 World Series. It was also his third career walk-off postseason hit, tying him with David Ortiz and Carlos Correa for the most in MLB history. Dodgers reliever Will Klein, who entered the game in the 15th inning, got the win by pitching four shutout innings.

Several World Series records were broken in Game 3. The teams combined to use 19 pitchers (ten for the Dodgers and nine for the Blue Jays), throwing a combined 609 pitches. A total of 37 men were left on base (19 for the Blue Jays, 18 for the Dodgers). Ohtani reached base nine times (becoming just the fourth player to accomplish this in a single game, and the first since Stan Hack in 1942) and was intentionally walked four times, both World Series records. Six outs were recorded on the base paths, which also shattered a World Series record.

Game 3 reached 18 innings, tying it with the 2005 NLDS Game 4, 2014 NLDS Game 2, 2018 World Series Game 3, and 2022 ALDS Game 3 as the longest postseason games in MLB history in terms of innings. The game lasted six hours and 39 minutes, making it the second-longest postseason game timewise, behind the aforementioned Game 3 of the 2018 World Series.

=== Game 4 ===
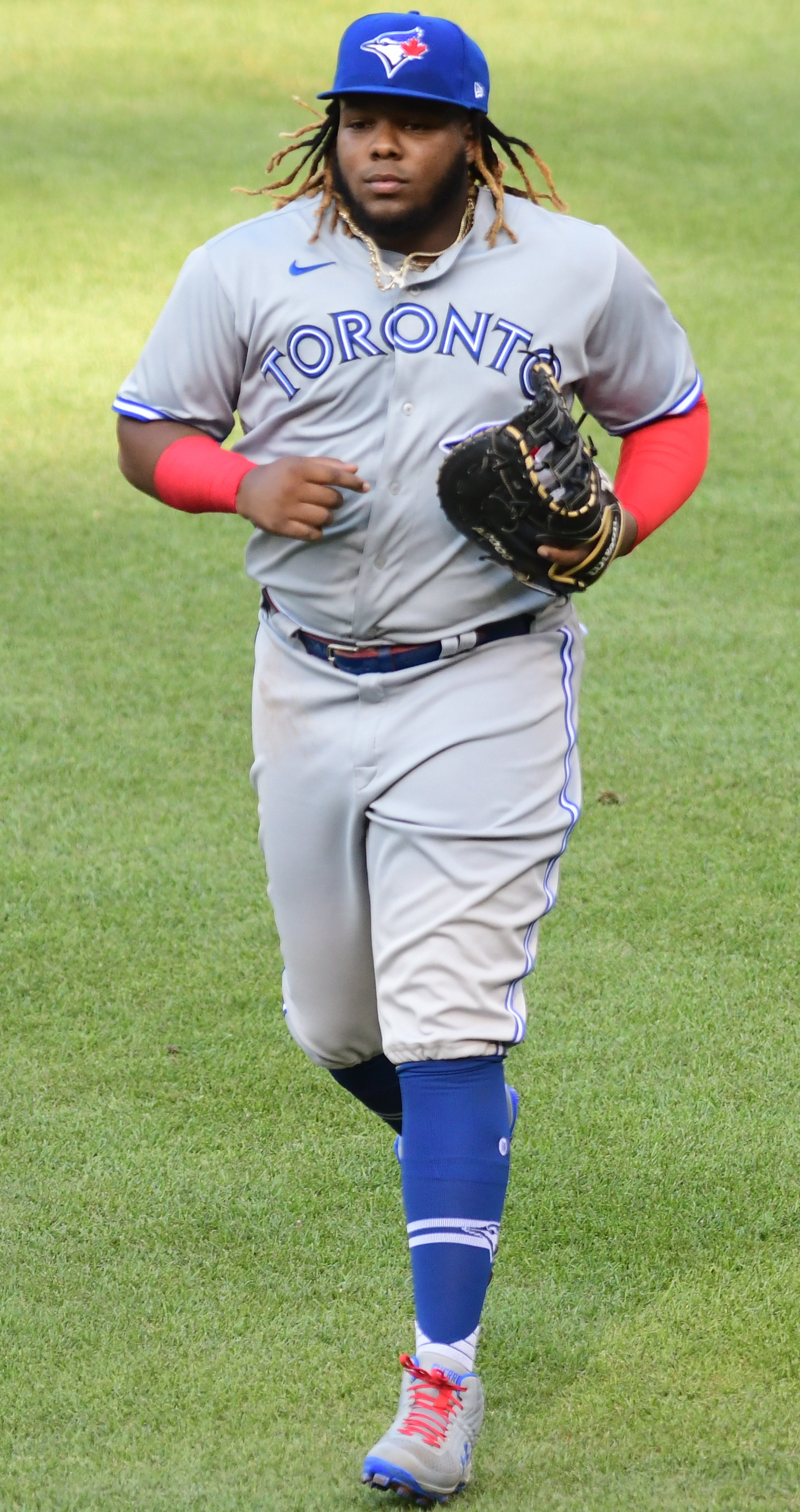
Vladimir Guerrero Jr. hit a two-run home run in Game 4.

October 28, 2025 5:11 pm (PDT) at Dodger Stadium in Los Angeles, California 85 °F (29 °C), Clear
| Team | 1 | 2 | 3 | 4 | 5 | 6 | 7 | 8 | 9 | R | H | E |
|---|---|---|---|---|---|---|---|---|---|---|---|---|
| Toronto | 0 | 0 | 2 | 0 | 0 | 0 | 4 | 0 | 0 | 6 | 11 | 0 |
| Los Angeles | 0 | 1 | 0 | 0 | 0 | 0 | 0 | 0 | 1 | 2 | 6 | 0 |
WP: Shane Bieber (1–0) LP: Shohei Ohtani (0–1); Home runs: TOR: Vladimir Guerrero Jr. (1); LAD: None; Attendance: 52,552; Boxscore

R&B singer and actress Deborah Cox sang the Canadian national anthem while R&B singer Tinashe sang the American national anthem. Orel Hershiser threw out the ceremonial first pitch. The starting pitchers for Game 4 were Shohei Ohtani for the Dodgers and Shane Bieber for the Blue Jays. After undergoing an MRI, Blue Jays outfielder George Springer was removed from the starting lineup for Game 4 due to right-side discomfort sustained during a swing in the seventh inning of Game 3. He was replaced as the designated hitter by Bo Bichette.

In the bottom of the second inning, Enrique Hernández hit a sacrifice fly to right field, allowing Max Muncy to score and take a 1–0 lead for the Dodgers. Vladimir Guerrero Jr. hit a two-run home run for the Blue Jays in the top of the third inning. Bieber pitched 5 1/3 innings, allowing four hits, one run, and walking three batters while striking out three. Ohtani pitched six innings, allowing six hits, four runs, and walking one batter while striking out six. He allowed the first two batters to reach base in the seventh inning; Anthony Banda relieved Ohtani and allowed an RBI single to Andrés Giménez. Pinch hitter Ty France drove in another run with a groundout. Blake Treinen relieved Banda and allowed back-to-back RBI singles to Bichette and Addison Barger as the Blue Jays extended their lead to 6–1. In the bottom of the ninth inning, Tommy Edman scored Teoscar Hernández on a groundout to cut the lead to 6–2. The Blue Jays got the final out of the game after Alex Call lined out to Myles Straw to tie the series at two games each.

=== Game 5 ===
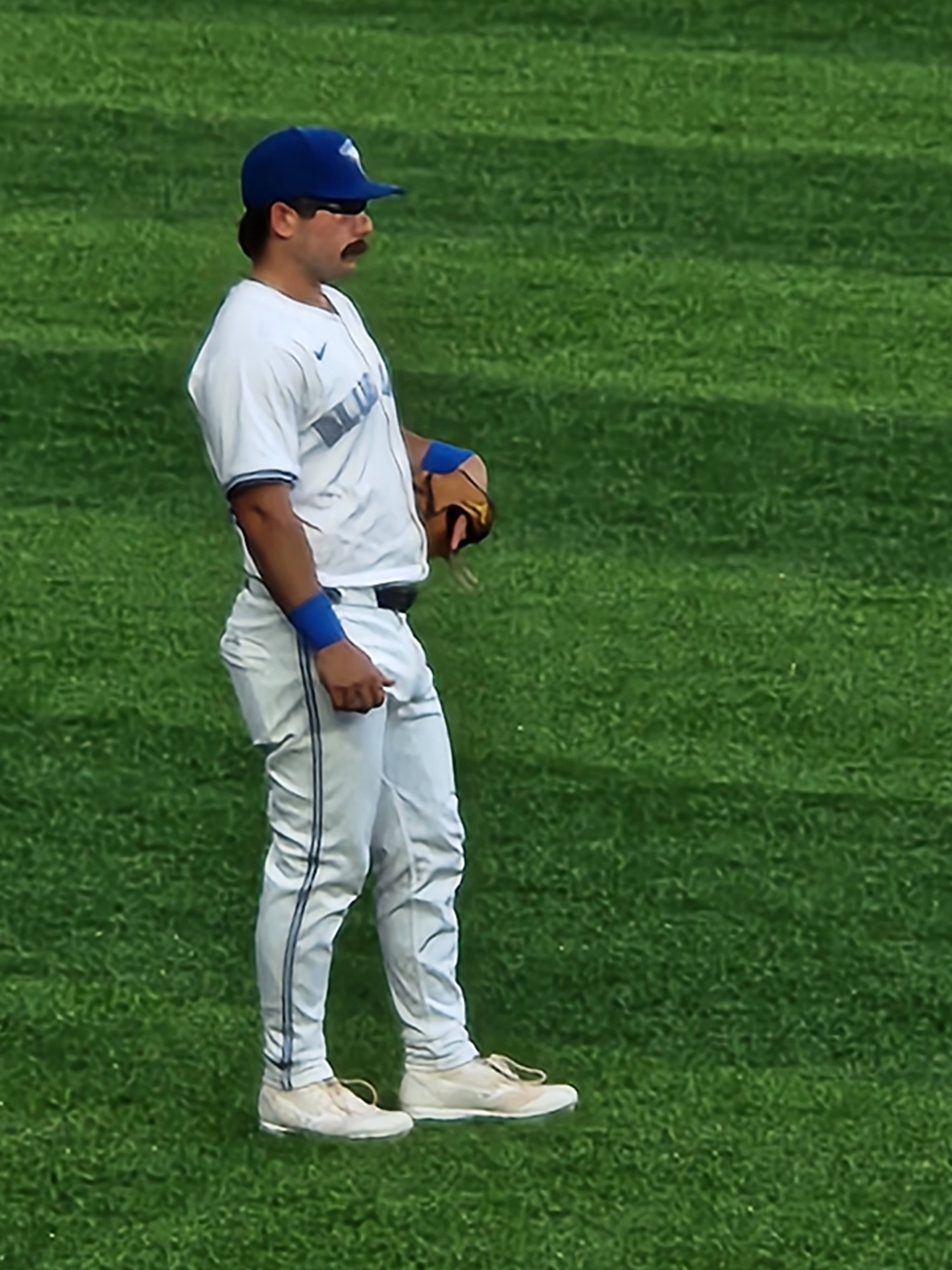
Davis Schneider hit a leadoff home run on the first pitch of Game 5.

October 29, 2025 5:10 pm (PDT) at Dodger Stadium in Los Angeles, California 86 °F (30 °C), Clear
| Team | 1 | 2 | 3 | 4 | 5 | 6 | 7 | 8 | 9 | R | H | E |
|---|---|---|---|---|---|---|---|---|---|---|---|---|
| Toronto | 2 | 0 | 0 | 1 | 0 | 0 | 2 | 1 | 0 | 6 | 9 | 0 |
| Los Angeles | 0 | 0 | 1 | 0 | 0 | 0 | 0 | 0 | 0 | 1 | 4 | 0 |
WP: Trey Yesavage (1–0) LP: Blake Snell (0–2); Home runs: TOR: Davis Schneider (1), Vladimir Guerrero Jr. (2); LAD: Enrique Hernández (1); Attendance: 52,175; Boxscore

Rufus Wainwright sang the Canadian national anthem in English and French while Dodgers anthem singer Keith Williams Jr., accompanied by organist Dieter Ruehle, sang the American national anthem. During the Canadian anthem, Wainwright sang "that only us command" instead of "in all of us command". Singer and actress Sofia Carson was scheduled to sing the American anthem at the game, but was replaced by Williams for an undisclosed reason. Magic Johnson threw out the ceremonial first pitch. Game 5 featured a rematch from Game 1 between starting pitchers Blake Snell for the Dodgers and Trey Yesavage for the Blue Jays.

On the first pitch of the game, Davis Schneider hit a solo home run off Snell, giving the Blue Jays a 1–0 lead. Vladimir Guerrero Jr. then homered two pitches later to extend the lead to 2–0. Enrique Hernández hit a solo home run off Blue Jays starter Yesavage in the bottom of the third inning to cut the Dodgers' deficit to 2–1. In the top of the fourth inning, Ernie Clement hit a sacrifice fly to score Daulton Varsho, extending the lead to 3–1. Snell pitched 6 2/3 innings, allowing six hits, three runs, and walking four batters while striking out seven. In the top of the seventh inning, Dodgers reliever Edgardo Henriquez walked Guerrero Jr. on a wild pitch, which enabled Addison Barger to score. Bo Bichette then hit an RBI single to extend the lead to 5–1. Yesavage pitched seven innings, recording 12 strikeouts (making him the youngest pitcher to strike out ten or more in a World Series game, breaking the record set by Smoky Joe Wood in 1912, and surpassing the previous rookie record of 11 set by Don Newcombe in 1949) while allowing three hits, one run, and no walks. In the top of the eighth inning, Isiah Kiner-Falefa hit an RBI single to extend the lead to 6–1. The Blue Jays got the final out of the game when closer Jeff Hoffman struck out Teoscar Hernández. The series then moved back to Toronto for Game 6, with the Blue Jays one win away from winning the World Series for the third time in franchise history.

=== Game 6 ===
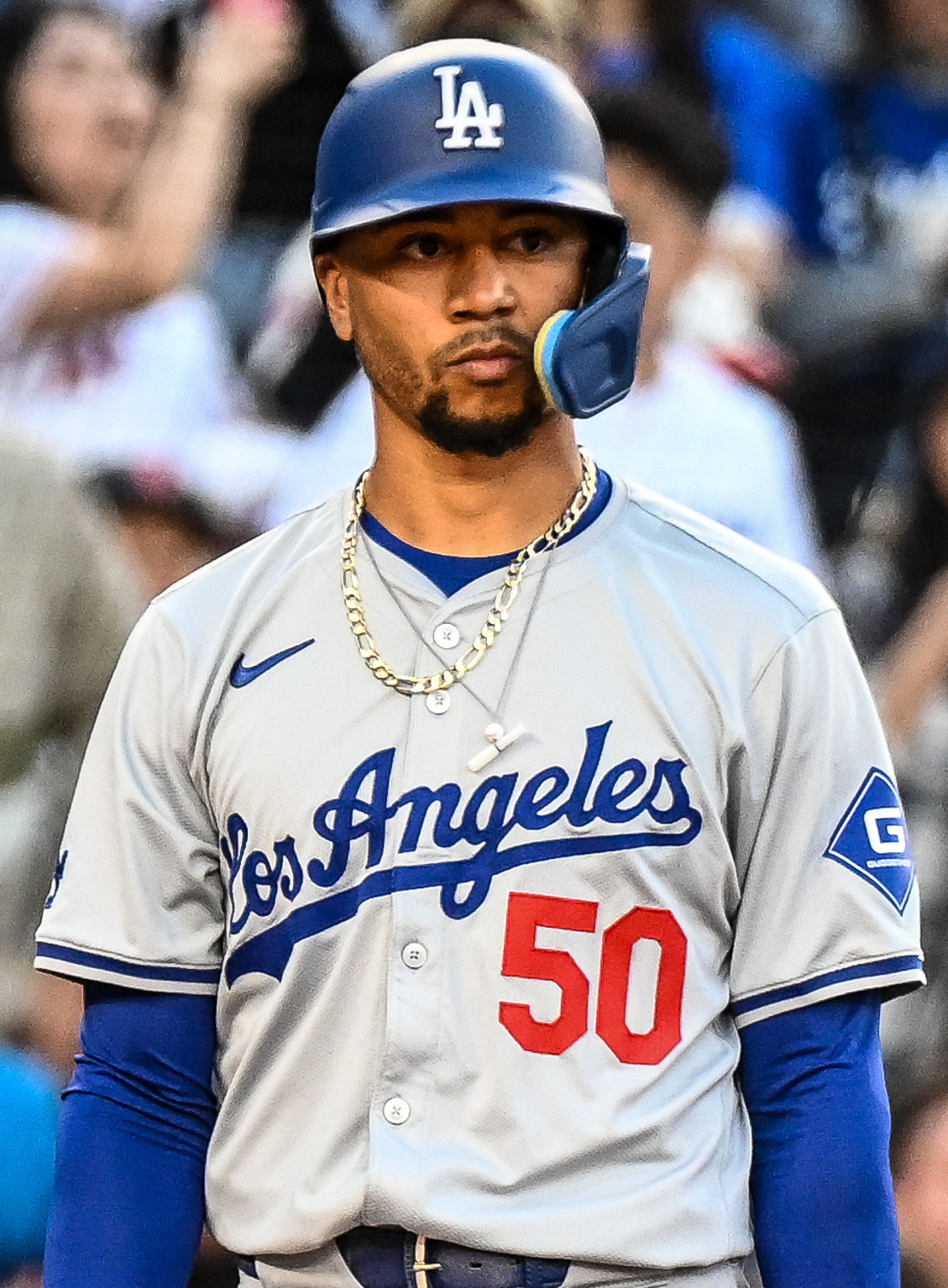
Mookie Betts hit a two-run single in Game 6.

Watch party in Toronto Nathan Phillips Square for Game 6

October 31, 2025 8:10 pm (EDT) at Rogers Centre in Toronto, Ontario 72 °F (22 °C), Roof Closed
| Team | 1 | 2 | 3 | 4 | 5 | 6 | 7 | 8 | 9 | R | H | E |
|---|---|---|---|---|---|---|---|---|---|---|---|---|
| Los Angeles | 0 | 0 | 3 | 0 | 0 | 0 | 0 | 0 | 0 | 3 | 4 | 1 |
| Toronto | 0 | 0 | 1 | 0 | 0 | 0 | 0 | 0 | 0 | 1 | 8 | 0 |
WP: Yoshinobu Yamamoto (2–0) LP: Kevin Gausman (0–2) Sv: Tyler Glasnow (1); Attendance: 44,710; Boxscore

Chicago Cubs anthem singer John Vincent sang the American national anthem while Royal Canadian Air Force Band vocalist and Warrant Officer David Grenon sang the Canadian national anthem in English and French. Devon White threw out the ceremonial first pitch.

Game 6 featured a rematch of the series' Game 2 starting pitchers, Kevin Gausman of the Blue Jays and Yoshinobu Yamamoto of the Dodgers. After missing the previous two games, George Springer returned to the Blue Jays' starting lineup for Game 6. The Dodgers scored first in the third inning after a double by Tommy Edman, an intentional walk to Shohei Ohtani, and an RBI double by Will Smith. Gausman loaded the bases with a walk to Freddie Freeman, and Mookie Betts drove in two runs with a single to extend the Dodgers' lead to 3–0. In the bottom of the third inning, the Blue Jays cut the Dodgers' lead to 3–1 when George Springer hit an RBI single, scoring Addison Barger. Gausman pitched six innings, allowing three hits, three runs, and walking two batters while striking out eight. Yamamoto pitched six innings, allowing five hits, one run, and walking one batter while striking out six. He was succeeded by relievers Justin Wrobleski and Roki Sasaki, who combined for six outs.

The Blue Jays began building momentum in the bottom of the ninth when Alejandro Kirk was hit by a 0–2 pitch to lead off the inning. Barger then hit a long fly ball to left-center which became lodged in the padding at the base of the outfield wall. This resulted in a dead-ball ground-rule double, preventing pinch-runner Myles Straw from scoring and leaving the runners at second and third with no outs. Even so, Toronto still had the tying runs in scoring position and could even secure their first championship in 32 years right there with a home run. However, Tyler Glasnow promptly came into the game to replace Sasaki, got a quick pop-out off the bat of Ernie Clement, and then got the final two outs when Andrés Giménez lined into a double play. Left fielder Enrique Hernández caught the liner and one-hopped the ball to second baseman Miguel Rojas, doubling Barger off second base and securing Game 6 for the Dodgers to force a winner-take-all Game 7.

=== Game 7 ===
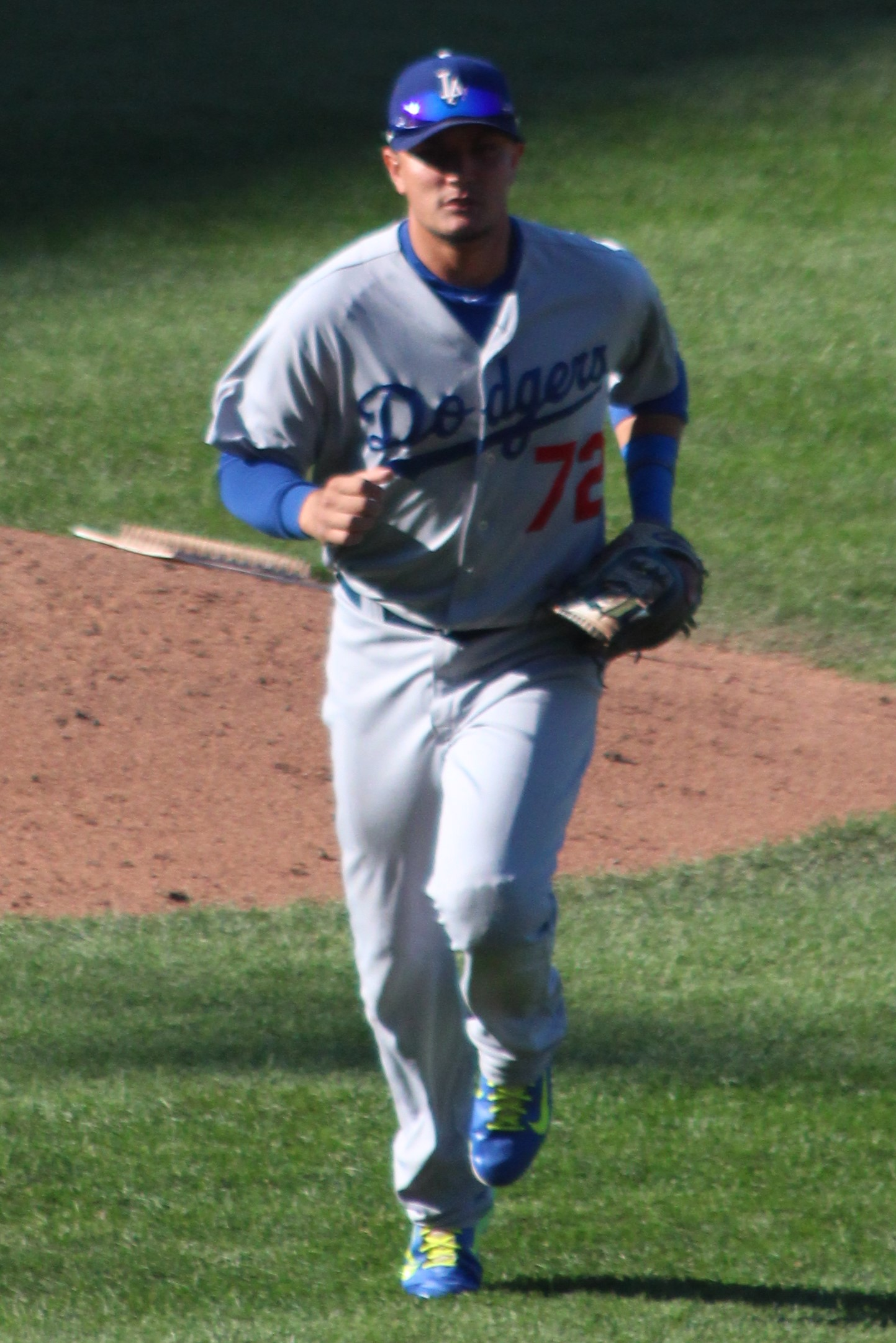
Miguel Rojas was the first player in MLB history to hit a game-tying home run in the 9th inning or later of a World Series Game 7.

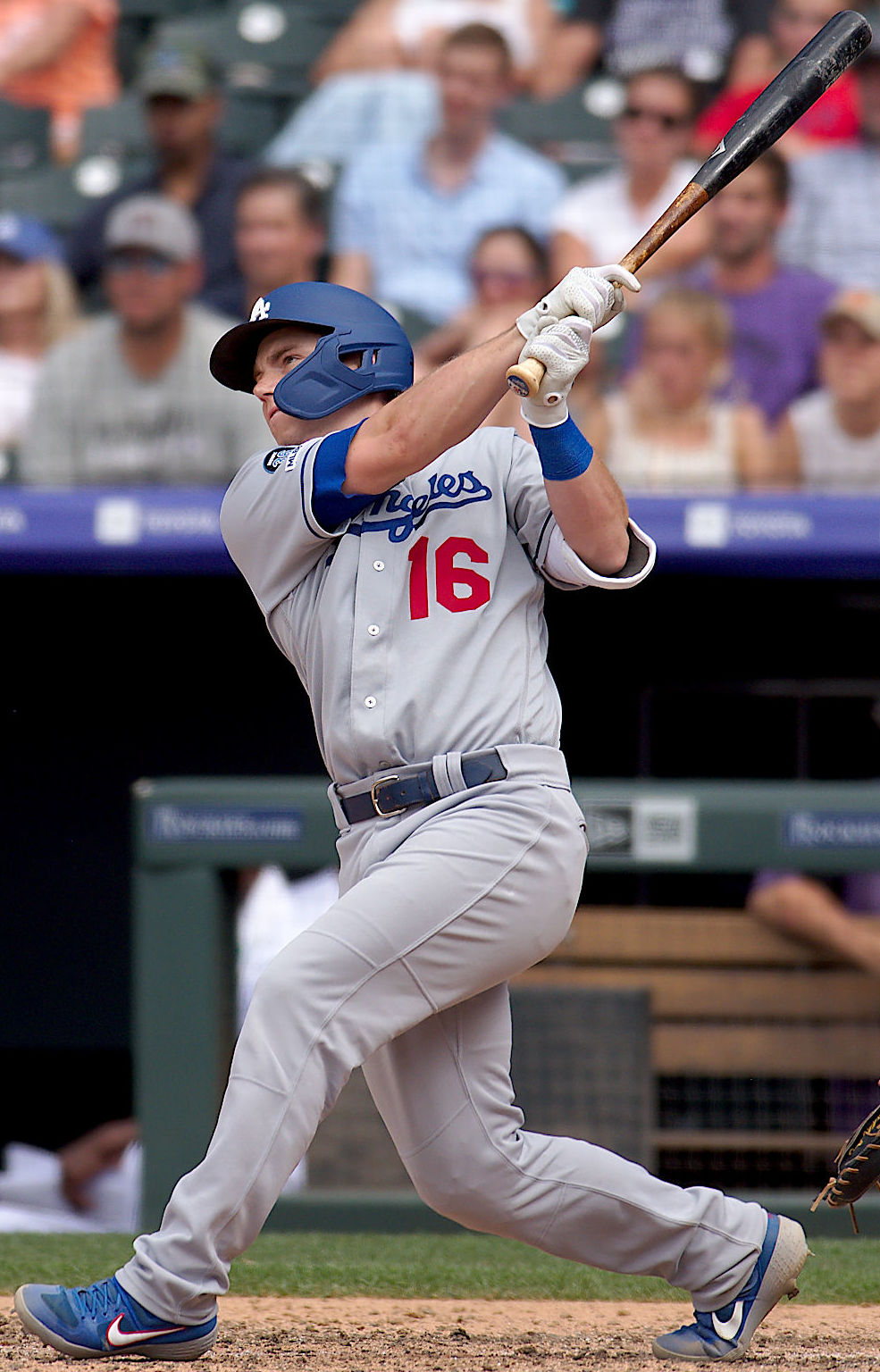
Will Smith hit the first-ever World Series extra-inning home run in a Game 7.

November 1, 2025 8:10 pm (EDT) at Rogers Centre in Toronto, Ontario 68 °F (20 °C), Roof Closed
| Team | 1 | 2 | 3 | 4 | 5 | 6 | 7 | 8 | 9 | 10 | 11 | R | H | E |
|---|---|---|---|---|---|---|---|---|---|---|---|---|---|---|
| Los Angeles | 0 | 0 | 0 | 1 | 0 | 1 | 0 | 1 | 1 | 0 | 1 | 5 | 11 | 0 |
| Toronto | 0 | 0 | 3 | 0 | 0 | 1 | 0 | 0 | 0 | 0 | 0 | 4 | 14 | 0 |
WP: Yoshinobu Yamamoto (3–0) LP: Shane Bieber (1–1); Home runs: LAD: Max Muncy (2), Miguel Rojas (1), Will Smith (2); TOR: Bo Bichette (1); Attendance: 44,713; Boxscore

External videos
- Game 7 full replay on the MLB's official YouTube channel

Pia Toscano sang the American national anthem and Noah Reid sang the Canadian national anthem. Jack Morris and Paul Molitor threw out the ceremonial first pitch. Blue Jays' Game 7 starter Max Scherzer was matched against two-way player Shohei Ohtani, making his first start ever on three days’ rest. Scherzer became the oldest pitcher to start a winner-take-all World Series game. Coincidentally, Scherzer also started in the last Game 7 of a World Series in 2019, while a member of the Washington Nationals.

In the bottom of the second inning, Ohtani escaped a two-out bases-loaded jam by striking out Andrés Giménez to keep the game scoreless. In the bottom of the third inning, a single by George Springer and a walk to Vladimir Guerrero Jr. preceded a three-run home run by Bo Bichette to give the Blue Jays a 3–0 lead. Ohtani pitched 2 1/3 innings, allowing five hits, three runs, and walking two batters while striking out three. The Dodgers loaded the bases in the top of the fourth inning before Blue Jays center fielder Daulton Varsho made a diving catch on a ball hit by Teoscar Hernández; Will Smith scored on the sacrifice fly, but the catch saved further damage. The inning ended with another diving catch by Guerrero Jr. on a line drive hit by Tommy Edman.

In the bottom of the fourth inning with one out, Dodger reliever Justin Wrobleski nearly hit Giménez with two inside pitches – the second of which Giménez appeared to throw his arm at intentionally in an attempt to get hit – before a third inside pitch did hit Giménez, and resulted in a benches-clearing incident when Giménez argued with Wrobleski. Wrobleski allowed a single but eventually finished the inning without allowing a run. Scherzer allowed a one-out single in the fifth inning before exiting; he pitched 4 1/3 innings, allowing four hits, one run, and walking one batter while striking out three. He was relieved by Louis Varland, who with his 15th appearance of the playoffs set a record for most pitching appearances in a single postseason. Varland allowed another hit but also escaped the jam without allowing a run. In the top of the sixth inning, the first two Dodgers reached base off Jays reliever Chris Bassitt, with Mookie Betts eventually scoring on a sacrifice fly by Edman to cut the Blue Jays' lead to 3–2. The Jays immediately answered in the bottom of the inning, when Ernie Clement led off with a single against Game 3 starter Tyler Glasnow, stole second, and scored on a Giménez RBI double to extend the lead to 4–2. The Dodgers' attempt to respond in the seventh inning was thwarted when Freddie Freeman grounded into a 3-6-3 double play initiated by Guerrero Jr.

In the top of the eighth inning, Max Muncy hit a solo home run off Game 5 starter Trey Yesavage to cut the Dodgers' deficit to 4–3, which prompted the Jays to bring in closer Jeff Hoffman for the four-out save. Ernie Clement hit a leadoff double off Emmet Sheehan in the bottom of the eighth inning, setting a record for hits in an MLB postseason with 30. However, Clement was stranded at second and Toronto could not capitalize off the leadoff double. In the top of the ninth inning, with the Blue Jays two outs from a championship, Miguel Rojas hit a one-out home run off of Hoffman to tie the game at 4–4. Rojas, who had been put in the lineup for Andy Pages after Game 5, had not had a hit since the Wild Card Series one month earlier. Rojas became the first player in MLB history with a game-tying home run in the ninth inning or later of a World Series Game 7. According to ESPN Insights, the Blue Jays had a 91.7 percent chance to win Game 7 before the homer.

In the bottom of the ninth inning, Snell attempted to force the game into extra innings. Guerrero Jr. flied out to center on a 3–0 count before Bichette singled and was pinch-run for by Isiah Kiner-Falefa. Addison Barger drew a walk to get Alejandro Kirk to the plate; the Dodgers countered by replacing Snell with Yoshinobu Yamamoto, who had thrown 96 pitches the previous night. On the second pitch, Kirk was hit in the arm to bring Daulton Varsho to the plate with the bases loaded and one out. With the infield in, Varsho hit a squeeze bunt to second baseman Rojas, who managed to throw to Smith just in time to force out Kiner-Falefa at home for the second out. The Blue Jays unsuccessfully challenged the call; the replay confirmed Smith's foot touched the plate just a split second before Kiner-Falefa's foot slid in. After the game, Kiner-Falefa was criticized for not taking a bigger lead off of third base; he explained that the coaches instructed him to stay close to third base to avoid getting doubled off at third in the event of a line drive, as he represented the winning run with the bases loaded and one out in the bottom of the ninth. According to Sportsnet's Ben Nicholson-Smith, Kiner-Falefa was subjected to vitriolic online abuse, including threats to “break his legs". Clement came up with two out and the bases loaded and hit a fly ball to the warning track in left-center field, but Dodgers center fielder Andy Pages, inserted as a defensive replacement before the prior at bat, made the catch while colliding with Hernández to escape the jam. This became the sixth winner-take-all World Series game to go to extra innings, and the first since 2016.

Seranthony Domínguez was sent to pitch for the Jays in the 10th inning. Mookie Betts drew a one-out walk before Max Muncy delivered a single and Teoscar Hernández drew a walk to load the bases, but the Jays got out of the jam with their own force out at home plate on a grounder hit by Pages, followed by a grounder to Guerrero Jr. by Enrique Hernández on which a covering Domínguez was just able to beat him to first base. With another chance to secure a walk-off win, the Blue Jays instead went down in order to send the game to the 11th inning to make it the first Game 7 to go past the tenth inning since 1997 and the third overall. Shane Bieber pitched for Toronto in the 11th, and Will Smith hit a two-out home run off Bieber to give Los Angeles a 5–4 lead, also becoming the first player to hit an extra-inning home run in a Game 7. In the bottom of the 11th, Guerrero Jr. lined a leadoff double to left field before Kiner-Falefa laid down a sacrifice bunt to advance Guerrero to third base with one out. Barger then drew a walk to set up Kirk at the plate with runners on the corners. On a 0–2 pitch, Kirk hit a broken-bat ground ball to Betts, who stepped on second and threw to Freeman at first to complete the double play to end the game and clinch the World Series for the Dodgers. It is also just the third time in World Series history that a series ended on a double play, and the first since 1947. The plate appearances for Barger and Kirk were baseball's first golden pitches—a situation where either team could win a championship on that pitch—since the 2016 World Series. Toronto went 3-for-17 with runners in scoring position, tying the record for most runners stranded on base in a World Series Game 7 set in 1924 by the New York Giants.

Yoshinobu Yamamoto won the World Series Most Valuable Player Award, the first pitcher to win the award since Stephen Strasburg in 2019. Yamamoto recorded three wins and 15 strikeouts with a 1.02 ERA. Yamamoto was the first pitcher to get three road wins in a World Series, and the second since 1968 to be credited with three wins in a World Series, joining Randy Johnson in 2001. He was also the first Japanese-born player to win the award since Hideki Matsui in 2009.

=== Composite line score ===
2025 World Series (4–3): Los Angeles Dodgers beat Toronto Blue Jays.

| Team | 1 | 2 | 3 | 4 | 5 | 6 | 7 | 8 | 9 | 10 | 11 | 12 | 13 | 14 | 15 | 16 | 17 | 18 | R | H | E |
|---|---|---|---|---|---|---|---|---|---|---|---|---|---|---|---|---|---|---|---|---|---|
| Los Angeles Dodgers | 1 | 3 | 6 | 1 | 2 | 1 | 5 | 3 | 2 | 0 | 1 | 0 | 0 | 0 | 0 | 0 | 0 | 1 | 26 | 53 | 3 |
| Toronto Blue Jays | 2 | 0 | 7 | 7 | 0 | 10 | 7 | 1 | 0 | 0 | 0 | 0 | 0 | 0 | 0 | 0 | 0 | 0 | 34 | 75 | 0 |
Home runs: LAD: Shohei Ohtani (3), Max Muncy (2), Will Smith (2), Freddie Freeman (1), Enrique Hernández (1), Teoscar Hernández (1), Miguel Rojas (1); TOR: Vladimir Guerrero Jr. (2), Alejandro Kirk (2), Addison Barger (1), Bo Bichette (1), Davis Schneider (1), Daulton Varsho (1); Total attendance: 335,764 Average attendance: 47,966; Winning player's share: $484,748 Losing player's share: $354,118

"It's gonna sound like sour grapes, and I don't really give a shit. I think the better team did not win this series."

— Sportsnet analyst Caleb Joseph on the postgame show after Game 7

For much of the series, Toronto outplayed Los Angeles (collecting 22 more hits, having three fewer errors, and scoring eight more runs throughout the course of the series), and were two outs away and a bases-loaded one-out situation from clinching, but could not finish the job. The Dodgers were the first team to be out-scored in a World Series by their opponent and win the Series since the 2003 Marlins. Ohtani and Smith were the only Dodgers players in the Series to have an on-base plus slugging above .800, compared to six Blue Jays players above the mark, and the Dodgers batted .203 in the World Series, the lowest mark by a champion since 1966. However, the Dodgers were more resourceful and the much better team in clutch situations, with their four wins decided by eight combined runs. Toronto also could not find ways to outlast Yoshinobu Yamamoto, who won Games 2 and 6, and pitched the last 2 2/3 innings for Los Angeles to win Game 7; in the Series, Yamamoto got 53 outs and allowed only 2 runs.

== Broadcasting ==
=== Television ===
MLB executives said that the 2025 World Series was the largest international broadcast operation in the history of baseball, estimating that 100 or more total cameras were used in Game 7, across four separate broadcast productions—Fox, Sportsnet, NHK, and MLB International.

==== United States ====
For the 26th straight year, the World Series was televised in the United States on Fox in English and on Fox Deportes in Spanish, and streamed on the Fox Sports app and Fox One. Play-by-play announcer Joe Davis (who was the Dodgers' lead television announcer on Spectrum SportsNet LA during the regular season) and color analyst John Smoltz called the English language broadcast of the games for Fox, and were joined by Ken Rosenthal and Tom Verducci as field reporters. Kevin Burkhardt hosted the pregame and postgame shows, joined by analysts Derek Jeter, Alex Rodriguez, and David Ortiz.

In Spanish, play-by-play announcer Adrian Garcia Marquez and color analyst Edgar Gonzalez called the series for Fox Deportes, and were joined by announcer/reporter Carlos Alvarez, reporter/analyst Jaime Motta and reporter Michelle Liendo. For the second consecutive year, Game 1 also aired in Spanish on Univision. Antonio de Valdés, Enrique Burak, Daniel Nohra, and Nelson Cruz called the game. Marie Claire Harp and Daniel Schvartzman served as reporters.

==== Canada ====
In Canada, the World Series was televised in English by Sportsnet and streamed on Sportsnet+. Play-by-play announcer Dan Shulman and color analyst Buck Martinez (who were the Blue Jays' lead television announcers during the regular season) called the English language broadcast of the games for Sportsnet, and were joined by Hazel Mae as field reporter. Jamie Campbell hosted the pregame and postgame shows alongside Madison Shipman and Joe Siddall.

This was the first World Series to have a dedicated Canadian English-language broadcast; due to MLB rules, Canadian broadcasters were previously required to simulcast the American telecast during the Blue Jays' postseason appearances (such as the Blue Jays' World Series appearances in 1992 and 1993, where CTV simulcast the CBS coverage), which faced routine criticism from Canadian viewers. In 2020, Sportsnet — a sibling property to the Blue Jays under Rogers Communications which televises their regular season games — received the right to produce its own telecasts of postseason games as MLB's national Canadian broadcaster, which would allow the network to carry its "regional" production into postseason games if the Blue Jays were to advance. Sportsnet used its own production resources, including 21 cameras and an aerial drone, to augment resources being provided by Fox Sports and MLB as part of the American production.

Broadcast television network Citytv (also owned by Rogers Communications) carried a simulcast of the U.S. Fox broadcast; to protect Canadian advertising revenue, "simsub" regulations allow Canadian broadcast stations to require that feeds of U.S. stations carried by subscription television services be replaced with feeds of a Canadian channel if they are simultaneously carrying the same program.

In French, play-by-play announcer Denis Casavant and color analyst Karl Gélinas called the series for TVA Sports; Casavant's long-time color analyst partner, Rodger Brulotte, was unavailable for the World Series as he was recovering from surgery to remove a cancerous tumor from his spine.

==== Japan ====
In Japan, the World Series was televised by NHK and J Sports and streamed on SPOTV NOW. NHK produced its own broadcast of the series, rather than taking the MLB International feed.

==== Ratings ====
In the United States, the series averaged 15.71 million viewers on Fox and 16.1 million across all platforms, up 2% from the 2024 Dodgers–Yankees series and marking the most-watched World Series since 2017. The full MLB postseason on Fox networks averaged 8.09 million viewers, the best since 2017. The decisive Game 7, an eleven-inning Dodgers victory on November 1, drew 26.88 million viewers on Fox and 27.33 million across all platforms, peaking at 33.06 million between 11:45 p.m.–12:00 a.m. ET. It was the most-watched World Series game since 2017's Game 7, up 16% from 2019's comparable game (Nationals–Astros: 23.19 M). Game 6 averaged 17.68 million viewers and an 8.0 rating, the most-watched World Series game since 2019 until surpassed the next night. Earlier games ranged from 5.2 to 7.2 household ratings. Digitally, Fox Sports reported record engagement, including a 752,000 average-minute audience for Game 7 and 1.3 billion social video views, up 96% year-over-year.

In Canada, Sportsnet reported an average of 7.5 million viewers across the series. The Game 7 telecast was one of the most-watched television broadcasts in Canadian history, with an average of 11.6 million viewers across Sportsnet and TVA Sports, a peak average viewership of 14 million on Sportsnet during the bottom of the ninth inning, and an estimated 18.5 million watching all or part of the game (representing approximately 45% of the country's population). In Japan, Game 6 was seen by an average of 13.1 million viewers on NHK General TV, and Game 7 was seen by an average of 12 million viewers on NHK BS.

Major League Baseball estimated that Game 7 was the most-watched MLB game since Game 7 of the 1991 World Series, with an aggregate audience of at least 51 million viewers across Canada, Japan, and the United States. The average audience for the entire series across those three countries was 34 million viewers.

| Game | U.S. ratings (households) | U.S. English audience (in millions) | U.S. Spanish audience (in millions) | Canada English audience (in millions) (Note: Linear television (Sportsnet and Citytv) only) | Ref |
|---|---|---|---|---|---|
| 1 | 5.72 | 12.499 | 1.045 | 6.408 | |
| 2 | 5.19 | 11.399 | 0.231 | 5.919 | |
| 3 | 5.28 | 11.157 | 0.250 | 5.183 | |
| 4 | 7.23 | 14.528 | 0.281 | 5.493 | |
| 5 | 7.11 | 14.293 | 0.170 | 6.386 | |
| 6 | 8.00 | 17.682 | 0.313 | 8.218 | |
| 7 | 11.5 | 26.882 | 0.488 | 9.533 (Note: Including streaming viewers, Rogers claimed a total average audience of 10.9 million.) | |

=== Radio ===
==== United States ====
For the 28th consecutive year, ESPN Radio broadcast the series in the United States. Jon Sciambi did play-by-play, with Jessica Mendoza (who was part of the Dodgers' television crew on Spectrum SportsNet LA during the regular season) and Eduardo Pérez providing color commentary and Buster Olney reporting from the field.

==== Canada ====
Sportsnet Radio, via the Toronto Blue Jays Radio Network (both flagshipped at CJCL in Toronto), broadcast the series in Canada. The Blue Jays' regular radio commentary team of Ben Shulman on play-by-play and Chris Leroux as color analyst announced the series. Dan and Ben Shulman became the first father-son duo to call a World Series for a national broadcaster.

== Sponsorship and marketing ==
The 2025 World Series was sponsored by Capital One, as part of a five-year, reported $125 million deal which began in 2022 and includes advertising in the stadium and commercials during Fox's telecasts of the games.

The Jonas Brothers performance during Game 2 at Rogers Centre was presented by MLB sponsor Mastercard.

Throughout Game 2, an actor dressed as Colonel Sanders appeared in the seating area behind home plate as part of a promotion by KFC Canada. (The Colonel himself was a resident of Mississauga, a Toronto suburb, in his later years.) Some viewers speculated that the spectator was acting on his own to throw off the Dodgers' Japanese players, as a reference to the Curse of the Colonel involving the Hanshin Tigers of Nippon Professional Baseball, before KFC confirmed its involvement after the game. KFC is not an official sponsor of either MLB or the Blue Jays (the latter being sponsored by Canadian rival Mary Brown's), although the chain does have a separate sponsorship agreement with Sportsnet for its postgame programming.

== Celebration ==
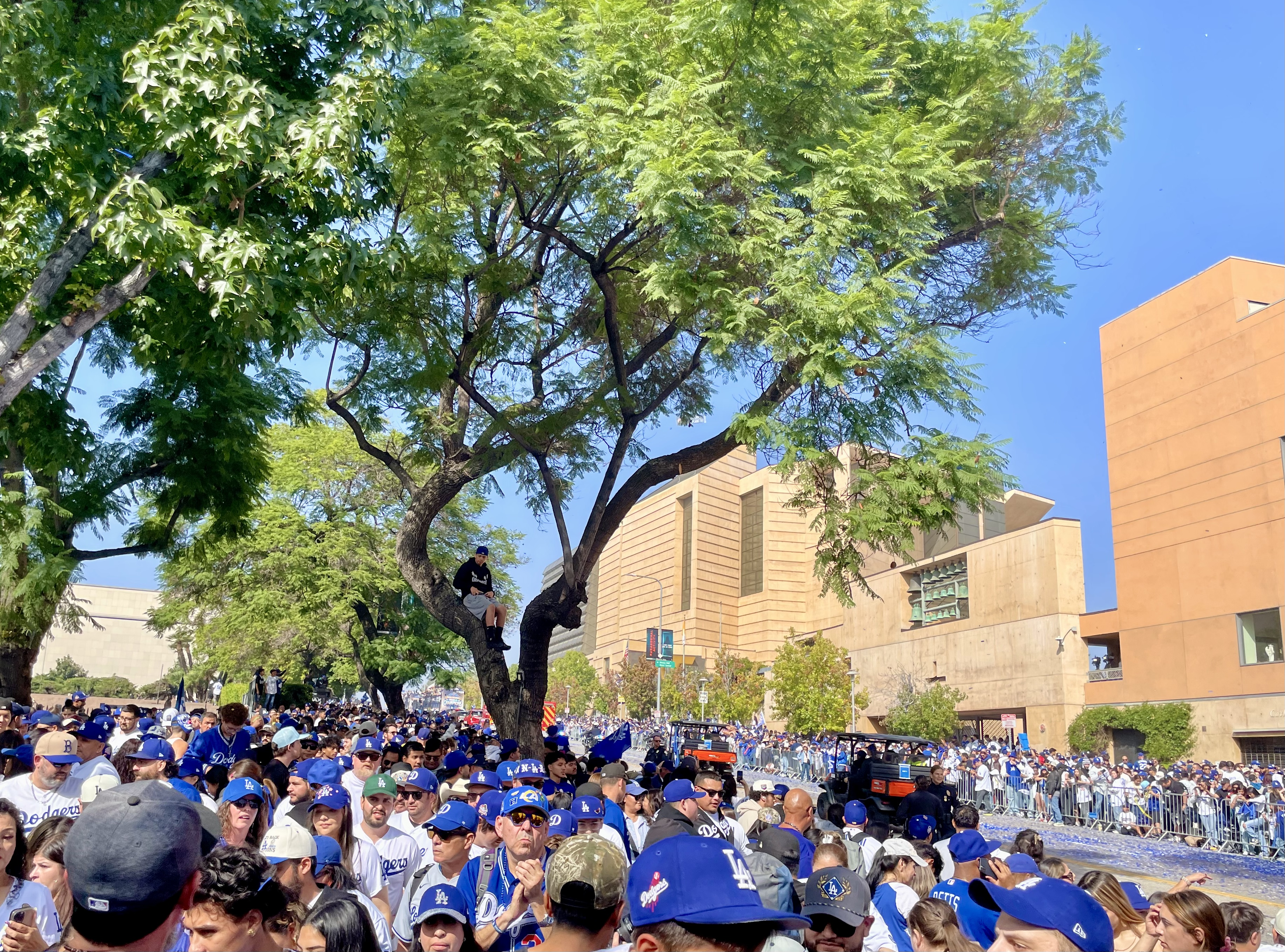
Parade route passes in front of the Cathedral of Our Lady of the Angels.

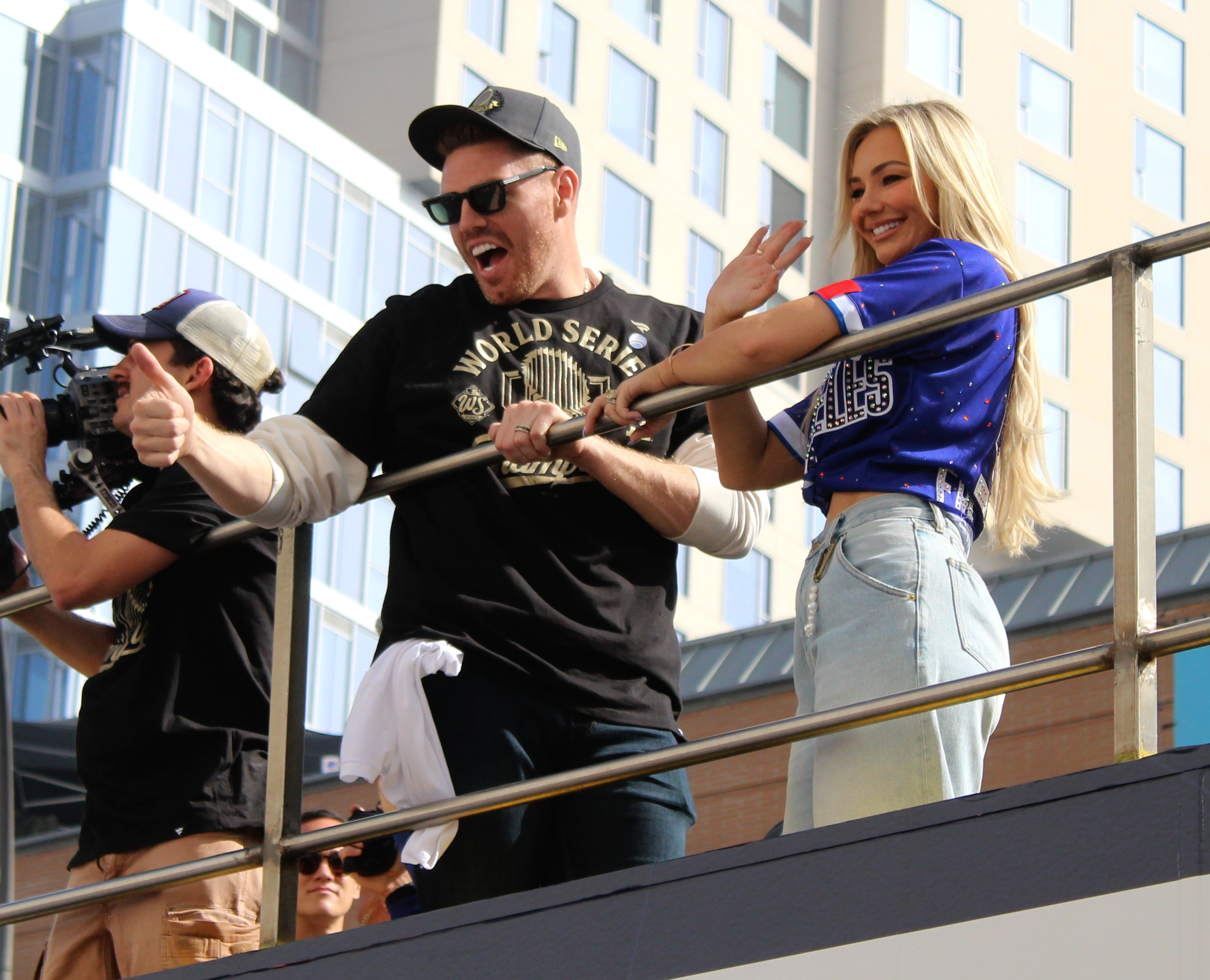
Freddie Freeman and wife Chelsea during the November 3, 2025 victory parade.

On November 3, the Dodgers held a victory parade starting in Downtown Los Angeles at Temple and Broadway Street eventually making its way up to Dodger Stadium. The highlight of the parade was when World Series MVP Yoshinobu Yamamoto took the microphone and stated in English, "You know what? Losing is not an option", which got a loud ovation, reiterating what he told Dave Roberts before the start of the World Series.

== Legacy ==
Baseball historians and media personalities Tim Kurkijan and Bob Costas both called the 2025 World Series the greatest World Series ever, with others calling Game 7 one of the greatest World Series games of all time. The bat used by Miguel Rojas to hit his ninth-inning, game-tying home run, as well as the spikes worn by Will Smith when he hit his go-ahead home run and the glove used by Mookie Betts throughout the World Series, including in his series-ending double play (among other items from the series) were sent to the National Baseball Hall of Fame in Cooperstown, New York to be put on display as part of their ‘Autumn Glory’ exhibit.

The Dodgers became the first team to repeat as World Series champions since the New York Yankees’ three-peat from 1998 to 2000, and the first National League team to do so since the Cincinnati Reds in 1975 and 1976. This was the first Dodgers team to repeat as Series champions in franchise history as they went 0–2 in previous such opportunities in 1956 and 1966.

The Dodgers were the fifth straight road team to win a Game 7 of a World Series, following the 2014 Giants, 2016 Cubs, 2017 Astros, and 2019 Nationals. They also became the first team to win the World Series after sweeping the League Championship Series (LCS) and with their opponent winning the pennant in a winner-take-all game since the Detroit Tigers did so in 1984, although the Dodgers were the first to do it since the LCS went to a best-of-seven format in 1985. With their ninth World Series victory, they moved into a three-way tie for third most with the Red Sox and Athletics, and trailing only the Cardinals and the Yankees with 11 and 27 World Series victories, respectively.

Subsequently, the Blue Jays' loss became known as one of the most heartbreaking in World Series history, comparable with the 1986 Red Sox and 2011 Rangers. They were ninth team to lose Game 6 and 7 at home in a World Series. Additionally, their defeat marked the first time a Toronto-based team had lost a championship series in the four major North American leagues since the 1960 Stanley Cup Final.

On MLB Network, Bob Costas and Tom Verducci hosted a special retrospective on Game 7 in December 2025.

== See also ==
- 2025 Japan Series
- 2025 Korean Series
- Game 7 (2025)
- Golden pitch
