= Addison Barger =

American baseball player (born 1999)

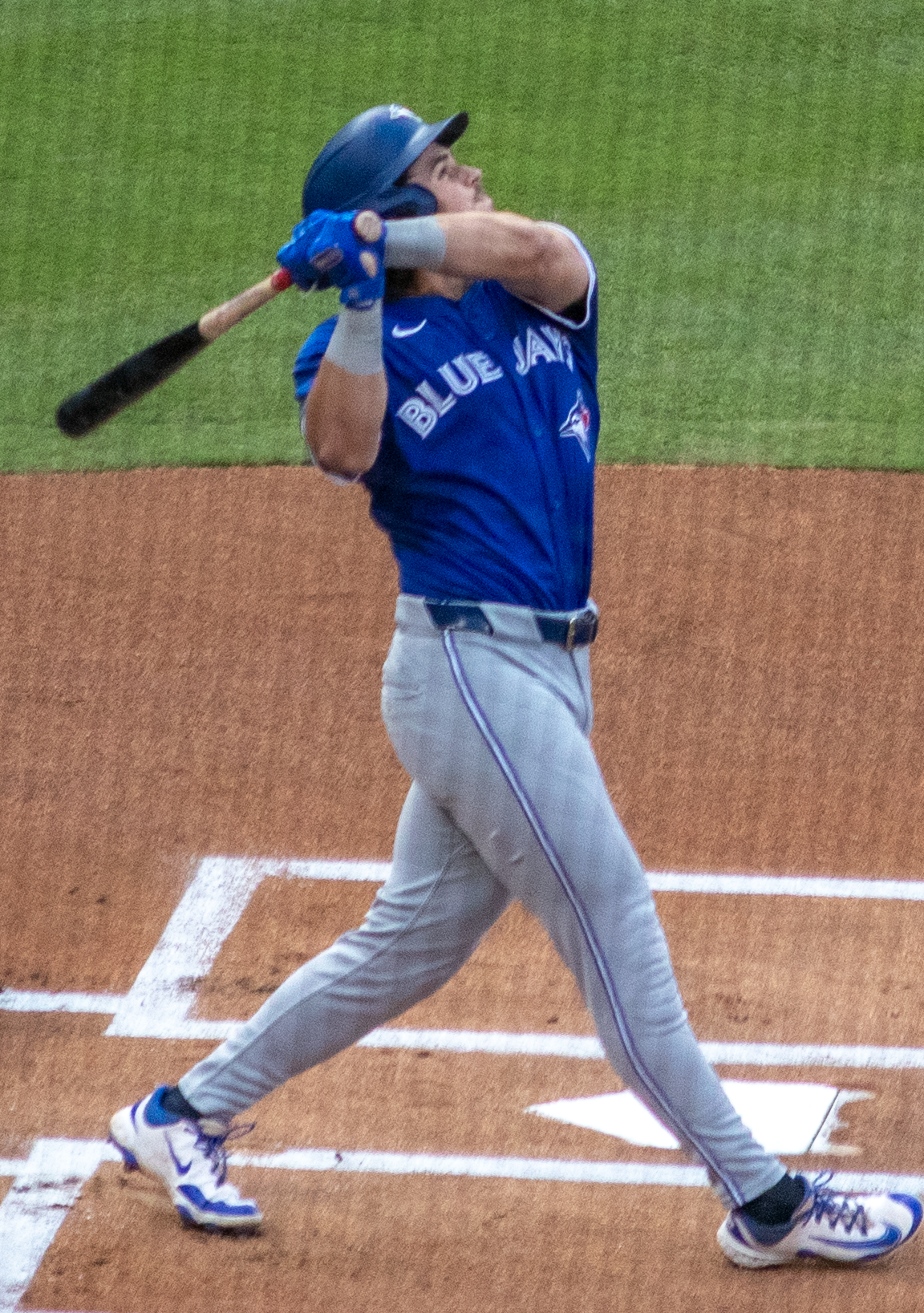
- Barger with the Blue Jays in 2025

Toronto Blue Jays – No. 47
- Third baseman / Right fielder
- Born: November 12, 1999 (age 27); Bellevue, Washington, U.S.
- Bats: Left Throws: Right

MLB debut
- April 24, 2024, for the Toronto Blue Jays

MLB statistics (through 2026 season)
- Batting average: .223
- Home runs: 28
- Runs batted in: 104
- Stats at Baseball Reference

Teams
- Toronto Blue Jays (2024–present)

Addison Barger (born November 12, 1999) is an American professional baseball third baseman and outfielder for the Toronto Blue Jays of Major League Baseball (MLB). He made his MLB debut in 2024.

== Early life ==
Barger was born in Bellevue, Washington, before moving to Florida at age six with his family, where they pursued missionary work. He was home-schooled and his father built a full-size baseball field in the backyard. His father hired former minor league baseball player Luis Arzeno to train him. When he was 14, his father and Arzeno, sent him to the Dominican Republic for two weeks to play in the Dominican Prospect League showcase. The next summer, his father created a travel team in Florida and invited 15 Dominican teenagers from the prospect showcase to play for the team and live at the Barger household and competed in tournaments against top teenage talent in Florida. He then attended C. Leon King High School in Tampa, Florida for his junior and senior years.

== Career ==
Barger was drafted by the Toronto Blue Jays in the sixth round of the 2018 Major League Baseball draft. He made his professional debut that season with the Rookie-level Gulf Coast League Blue Jays, recording a .194 batting average, three home runs, and 18 runs batted in (RBI). Barger played 2019 with the Rookie Advanced Bluefield Blue Jays of the Appalachian League, hitting .283 with two home runs and eight RBI in 13 games.

Barger did not play in a game in 2020 due to the cancellation of the minor league season because of the COVID-19 pandemic. He returned in 2021 to play for the Low-A Dunedin Blue Jays and High-A Vancouver Canadians, where he hit .244 with 18 home runs and 82 RBI in 96 games. He started 2022 with Vancouver before being promoted to the Double-A New Hampshire Fisher Cats, and later briefly to the Triple-A Buffalo Bisons. In a career-high 124 games, Barger recorded a .308 batting average, 26 home runs, and 91 RBI. In the offseason, he played 16 games for the Salt River Rafters of the Arizona Fall League.

On November 15, 2022, the Blue Jays added Barger to their 40-man roster to protect him from the Rule 5 draft. Barger was optioned to the Bisons to begin the 2023 season. In 94 total games that season, he hit .247 with nine home runs and 47 RBI. Barger was again optioned to Triple–A Buffalo to begin the 2024 season.

On April 24, 2024, Barger was promoted to the major leagues for the first time after Kevin Kiermaier was placed on the injured list. Barger collected his first major league hit on April 29 against the Kansas City Royals. On July 29, he hit his first MLB home run in a game against the Baltimore Orioles. In 69 appearances for the Blue Jays during his rookie campaign, Barger batted .197/.250/.351 with seven home runs, 28 RBI, and two stolen bases.

Barger was optioned to Triple-A Buffalo to begin the 2025 season. He was recalled to the Blue Jays on April 15. In Game 1 of the 2025 World Series against the Los Angeles Dodgers, Barger hit his first career grand slam, while pinch-hitting for Davis Schneider. It was the first grand slam hit by a pinch hitter in World Series history, as well as the first in Blue Jays postseason history. Barger revealed that he had slept the night before on the pullout sofa in Schneider's room at the Toronto Marriott City Centre, a story which went viral and prompted the hotel to display the sofa in the lobby next week. The Blue Jays eventually lost in seven games.

Barger played in nine games for Toronto during the 2026 season, going 1-for-22 (.045) with two RBI and five walks. On May 11, 2026, Barger was placed on the injured list due to right elbow inflammation. On June 29, Barger was shut down due to a stress reaction in his back. He was transferred to the 60-day injured list on July 23. The following day, it was announced that Barger would undergo season-ending elbow surgery.

== Personal life ==
Barger and his wife have three children, a daughter and two sons.
