= Alejandro Kirk =

Mexican baseball player (born 1998)

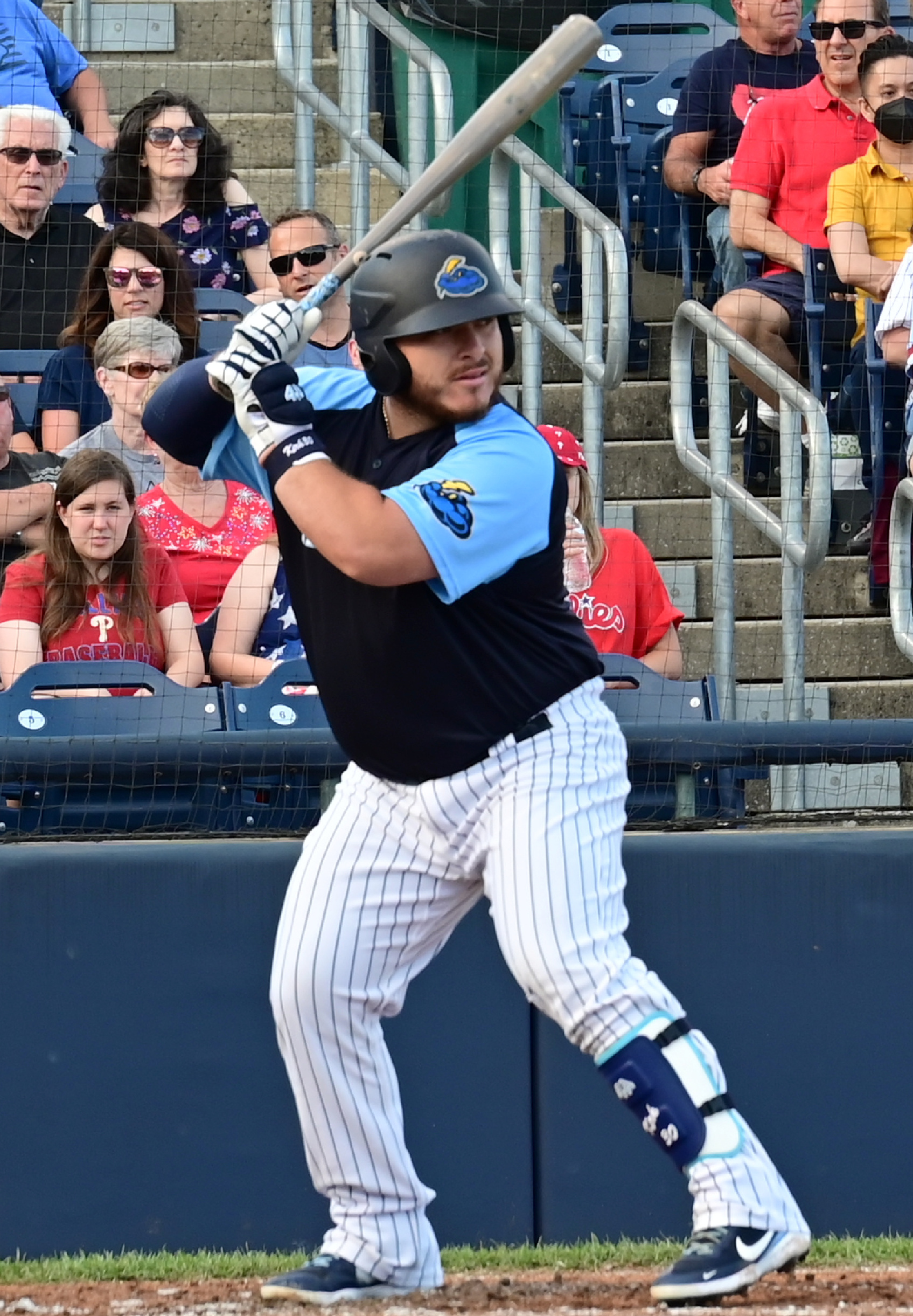
- Kirk with the Buffalo Bisons in 2021

Toronto Blue Jays – No. 30
- Catcher
- Born: November 6, 1998 (age 27); Tijuana, Baja California, Mexico
- Bats: Right Throws: Right

MLB debut
- September 12, 2020, for the Toronto Blue Jays

MLB statistics (through 2026 season)
- Batting average: .270
- Home runs: 61
- Runs batted in: 306
- Stats at Baseball Reference

Teams
- Toronto Blue Jays (2020–present)

Career highlights and awards
- 2× All-Star (2022, 2025); Silver Slugger Award (2022)

Alejandro Kirk (born November 6, 1998) is a Mexican professional baseball catcher for the Toronto Blue Jays of Major League Baseball (MLB). He was named an All-Star and Silver Slugger in 2022, and an All-Star again in 2025.

== Early life ==
Kirk was born in Tijuana, Mexico, and began playing baseball at three years of age. Growing up, he was a fan of Albert Pujols and the St. Louis Cardinals. His Little League team was coached by his father, Juan Manuel Kirk, an amateur player known locally in Tijuana. Kirk has a younger brother, Andres, and an elder brother, Juan Manuel Jr., a professional catcher for the Pericos de Puebla.

Kirk began catching around age 12 or 13, when his team needed a catcher and his father encouraged him to try the position. He says he was happy to do so, since he idolized his older brother and wanted to follow in his footsteps.

== Professional career ==
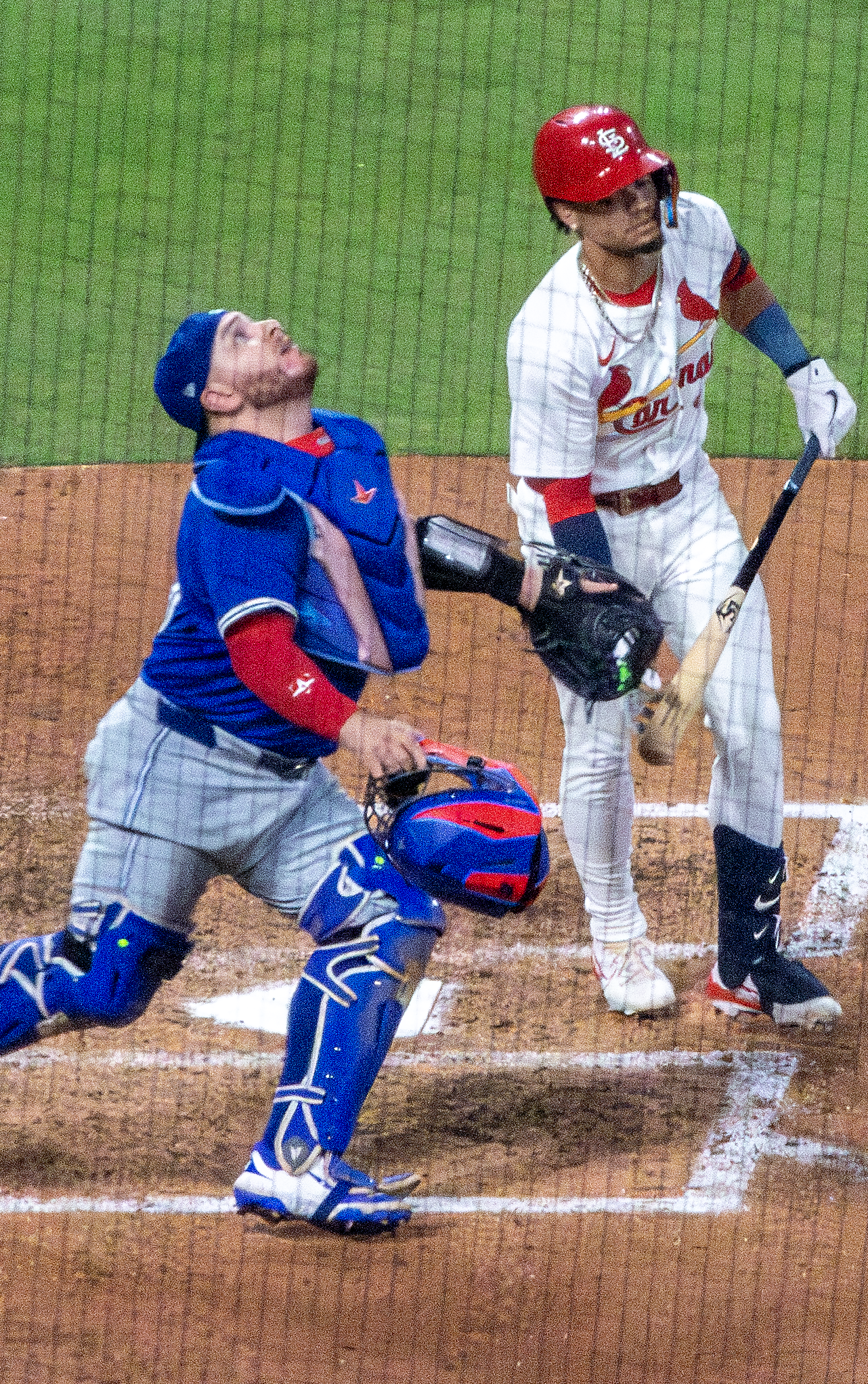
Kirk gets under a Masyn Winn pop up in 2025.

Kirk was discovered by Toronto Blue Jays scout Dean Decillis at a showcase held by the Toros de Tijuana of the Mexican League. He was signed by the team on September 24, 2016, and received a $7,500 signing bonus, with the Toros receiving $22,500 to release him. He made his professional debut with the Rookie-level Gulf Coast League Blue Jays in 2017, appearing in one game. He played the entire 2018 season with the Rookie Advanced Bluefield Blue Jays, and recorded a .354 batting average with 10 home runs and 57 runs batted in (RBI) in 58 games. Kirk also walked more than he struck out, finishing the season with 33 and 21 respectively. He was promoted to the Single-A Lansing Lugnuts to begin the 2019 season, and later earned a promotion to the High-A Dunedin Blue Jays, where he finished the year. In 92 total games played, Kirk hit .290 with seven home runs, 44 RBI, and 56 walks against just 39 strikeouts. On February 7, 2020, the Blue Jays invited Kirk to spring training.

Kirk was expected to begin the 2020 minor league season with the Double-A New Hampshire Fisher Cats, but the season was delayed and ultimately cancelled by the COVID-19 pandemic. He was added to the team's taxi squad on September 1, 2020. On September 11, Kirk was called up by the Blue Jays. He made his debut the following night, and recorded his first MLB hit. On September 21, 2020, he recorded four hits and his first home run in the majors. He also became the first catcher 21 or younger with four hits in a game since Joe Mauer in 2004. Overall with the 2020 Blue Jays, Kirk batted .375 with one home run and three RBI in nine games.

On May 8, 2021, Kirk was placed on the 60-day injured list with a left hip flexor injury. On July 20, Kirk was activated off of the injured list after missing over two months of action. Overall for the 2021 season, Kirk batted .242 with eight home runs and 24 RBI in 60 games.

On July 8, 2022, Kirk was named an All-Star for the first time, along with teammate Vladimir Guerrero Jr. Kirk finished the 2022 season batting .285 with 14 home runs and 63 RBI. On November 10, he was announced as the winner of the Silver Slugger award at catcher for the American League.

On March 22, 2025, Kirk signed a five-year, $58 million contract extension with the Blue Jays. On July 6, Kirk was named to the American League All-Star team for the second time. He became the first Blue Jays catcher with multiple appearances at the All-Star Game. Not known for speed, Kirk achieved the first stolen base of his career on August 15. On September 28, Kirk hit two home runs against the Tampa Bay Rays, including a grand slam, in a victory that clinched the AL East title for the Toronto Blue Jays, their first division championship since 2015.

Kirk made the final out of the 2025 World Series against the Los Angeles Dodgers, grounding into a double play to Dodgers' shortstop Mookie Betts. That 11th inning at-bat against Yoshinobu Yamamoto was the 15th "golden pitch" situation in baseball history, a rare occurrence by which either team could theoretically win the World Series championship on the next pitch.

On April 7, 2026, it was announced that Kirk would miss at least six weeks after undergoing surgery to repair a broken left thumb. He was activated from the injured list on June 12.

== Personal life ==
Kirk and his wife, Sofia, had their first child, a daughter, in February 2023. He is of Irish ancestry, and his grandfather was born in Ciudad Obregón, Sonora.
