= Will Klein (baseball) =

American baseball player (born 1999)

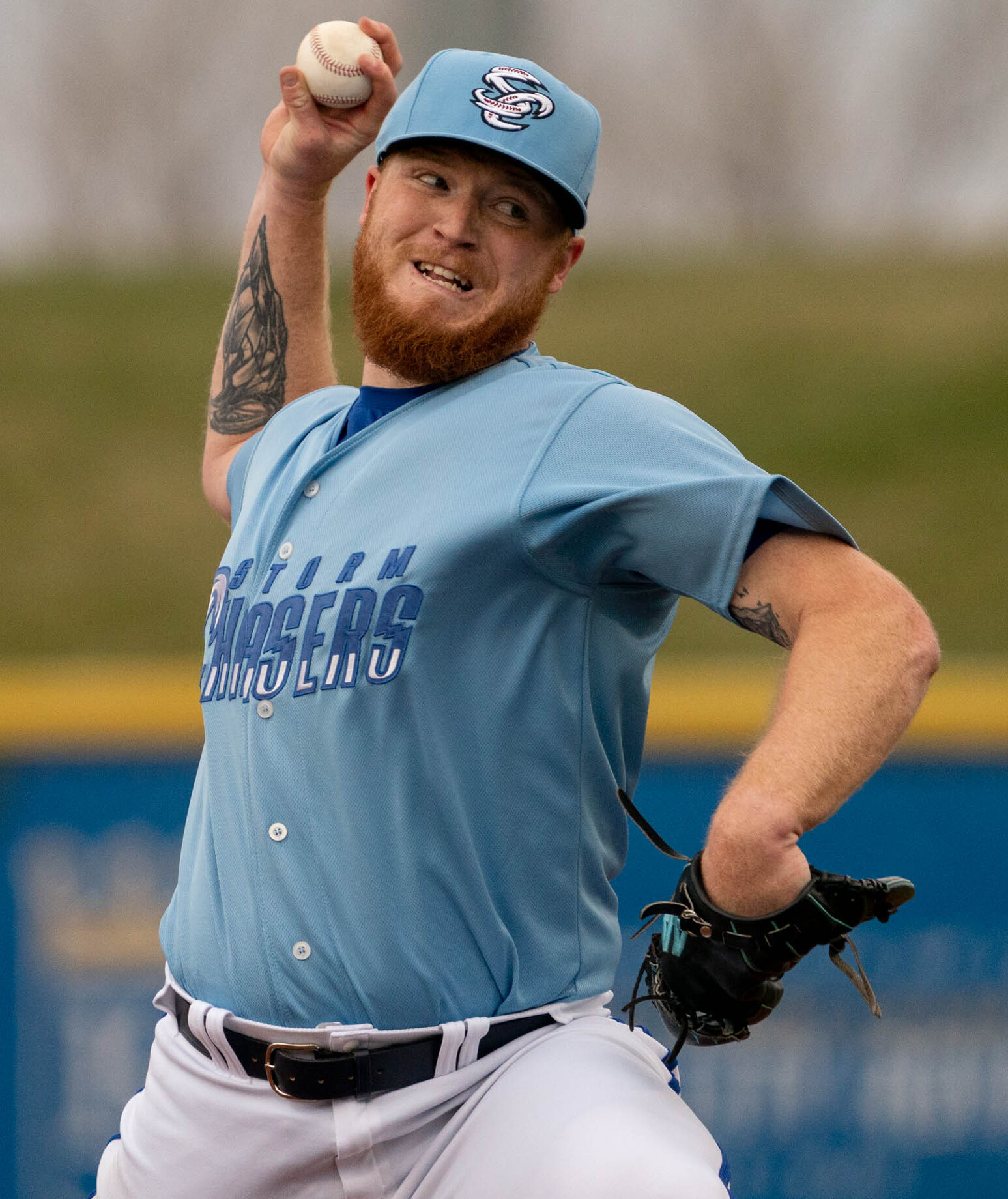
- Klein pitching for the Omaha Storm Chasers in 2024

Los Angeles Dodgers – No. 61
- Pitcher
- Born: November 28, 1999 (age 26); Bloomington, Indiana, U.S.
- Bats: Right Throws: Right

MLB debut
- April 28, 2024, for the Kansas City Royals

MLB statistics (through 2026 season)
- Win–loss record: 5–5
- Earned run average: 4.20
- Strikeouts: 77
- Stats at Baseball Reference

Teams
- Kansas City Royals (2024); Oakland Athletics (2024); Los Angeles Dodgers (2025–present)

Career highlights and awards
- World Series champion (2025)

William Boone Klein (born November 28, 1999) is an American professional baseball pitcher for the Los Angeles Dodgers of Major League Baseball (MLB). He has previously played in MLB for the Kansas City Royals and Oakland Athletics.

== Amateur career ==
Klein attended Bloomington High School North in Bloomington, Indiana. As a senior in 2017, he pitched only 17 2/3 innings after breaking his thumb, but still struck out 30 batters and compiled a 1.98 earned run average (ERA). Unselected in the 2017 Major League Baseball draft, he enrolled at Eastern Illinois University to play college baseball for the Eastern Illinois Panthers. He posted a 6.62 ERA over 17 2/3 innings as a freshman, a 5.11 ERA over 24 2/3 innings as a sophomore, and a 3.33 ERA with 33 strikeouts as a junior in 2020 before the season was cancelled due to the COVID-19 pandemic.

In 2019, between his sophomore and junior years at EIU, he played collegiate summer baseball with the Lakeshore Chinooks of the Northwoods League.

== Professional career ==
=== Kansas City Royals ===
Klein was selected by the Kansas City Royals in the fifth round with the 135th overall pick of the 2020 Major League Baseball draft. He signed for $200,000.

Klein made his professional debut in 2021 with the Quad Cities River Bandits of the High-A Central. Over 36 relief appearances, he went 7–1 with a 3.20 ERA, 121 strikeouts, and 44 walks over 70 1/3 innings pitched. MLB Pipeline named Klein the Royals' Pitching Prospect of the Year following the season's end. He missed the beginning of the 2022 season due to shin splints. He returned to play in mid-May with the Northwest Arkansas Naturals of the Double–A Texas League as a member of their starting rotation, but was later moved to the bullpen. Over thirty games (three starts), he went 1–1 with a 10.51 ERA, 55 strikeouts, and 51 walks over 43 2/3 innings. He returned to the Naturals to open the 2023 season. In mid-June, he was promoted to the Omaha Storm Chasers of the Triple-A International League. He was selected to represent the Royals at the 2023 All-Star Futures Game. Over 49 appearances between Northwest Arkansas and Omaha, Klein went 1–5 with a 4.62 ERA, 93 strikeouts, and 39 walks over 64 1/3 innings.

On November 14, 2023, the Royals added Klein to their 40-man roster to protect him from the Rule 5 draft. He was optioned to Triple–A Omaha to begin the 2024 season. On April 25, 2024, Klein was promoted to the major leagues for the first time following an injury to Alec Marsh. In five appearances for Kansas City, he recorded a 6.35 ERA with six strikeouts across 5 2/3 innings pitched.

=== Oakland Athletics ===
On July 30, 2024, the Royals traded Klein, Mason Barnett, and Jared Dickey to the Oakland Athletics in exchange for Lucas Erceg. He allowed five runs on two hits and four runs in 1 2/3 innings pitched across three games. Klein was designated for assignment by the Athletics on January 17, 2025.

=== Seattle Mariners ===
On January 21, 2025, Klein was traded to the Seattle Mariners in exchange for international bonus pool space. He was optioned to the Triple-A Tacoma Rainiers to begin the season, where he struggled to a 7.17 ERA with 32 strikeouts and three saves over 22 appearances. On May 31, Klein was designated for assignment by the Mariners.

=== Los Angeles Dodgers ===
On June 2, 2025, the Los Angeles Dodgers acquired Klein from the Mariners in exchange for Joe Jacques. He pitched in 14 games for the Dodgers, with a 2.35 ERA in 15 1/3 innings. In 22 2/3 innings over 20 games for the Triple-A Oklahoma City Comets, he finished with a 5.16 ERA.

After being inactive for the first three rounds of the postseason, Klein was added to the Dodgers active roster for the 2025 World Series. In Game 3, with the Dodgers' bullpen depleted, Klein struck out five batters across four scoreless innings and was credited with the win after the Dodgers secured a walk-off victory in the bottom of the 18th inning. The appearance was the longest of Klein's major league career; he had never pitched more than two innings in any major league game. The Dodgers won the series in seven games.

Klein made 36 appearances for the Dodgers in the 2026 season, with a 3–4 record and 3.67 ERA in 41 2/3 innings while also recording two saves. He was placed on the injured list on August 1 with right elbow discomfort and an MRI determined that he had bone chips in the elbow. He was moved to the 60-day injured list on September 2, ending his season. After the season, Klein had surgery to remove bone chips and clean up a bone spur in his right elbow.
