= Second baseman =

Baseball fielding position

The position of the second baseman

In baseball and softball, second baseman, abbreviated 2B, is a fielding position in the infield, between second and first base. The second baseman often possesses quick hands and feet, needs the ability to get rid of the ball quickly, and must be able to make the pivot on a double play. In addition, second basemen are usually right-handed; only four left-handed throwing players have ever played second base in Major League Baseball since 1950. In the numbering system used to record defensive plays, the second baseman is assigned the number 4.

Good second basemen need to have very good range since they have to field balls closer to the first baseman who is often holding runners on, or moving towards the base to cover. On a batted ball to right field, the second baseman goes out towards the ball for the relay, provided that there are no runners on base. Due to these requirements, second base is sometimes a primarily defensive position in the modern game, but there are hitting stars as well.

Second base is often referred to as the "Keystone". This is due to its position on the infield at the top of the diamond, similar to the keystone block in architecture.

== Functions ==
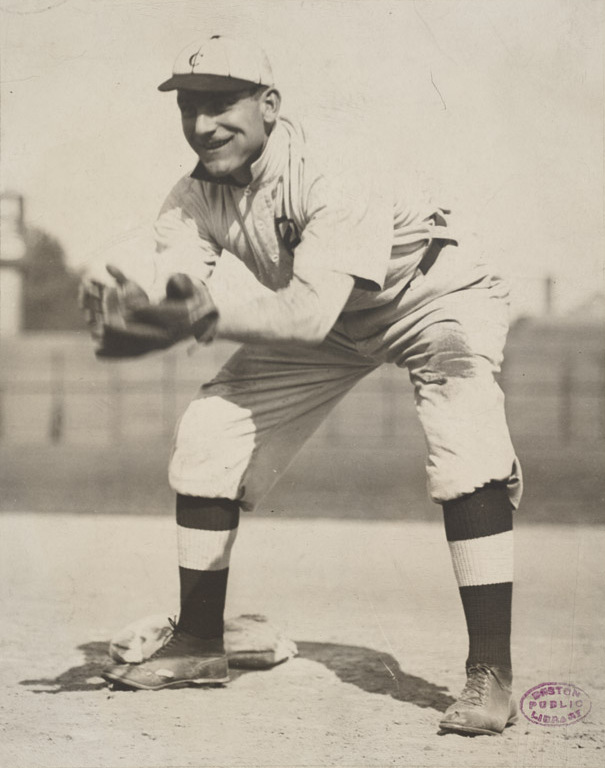
Nap Lajoie was the first second baseman to be inducted into the Baseball Hall of Fame.

The second baseman catches line drives or pop flies hit near them, and fields ground balls hit near them and then throws the ball to a base to force out a runner. In this case, if the runner is to be forced out at second base then that base is covered by the shortstop.

With a runner on first base, on a ground ball to the shortstop or third baseman the second baseman will cover second base to force out the runner coming from first. Moreover, if there are fewer than two outs they will attempt to turn the double play: that is, they will receive the throw from the other player with their foot on second base (to force out the runner coming from first base), and in one motion pivot toward first base and throw the ball there (to force out the batter before they get there).

If a runner on first base attempts to steal second base, or if the pitcher attempts to pick off a runner already at second base, then either the second baseman or the shortstop will cover second base.

== National Baseball Hall of Fame second basemen ==
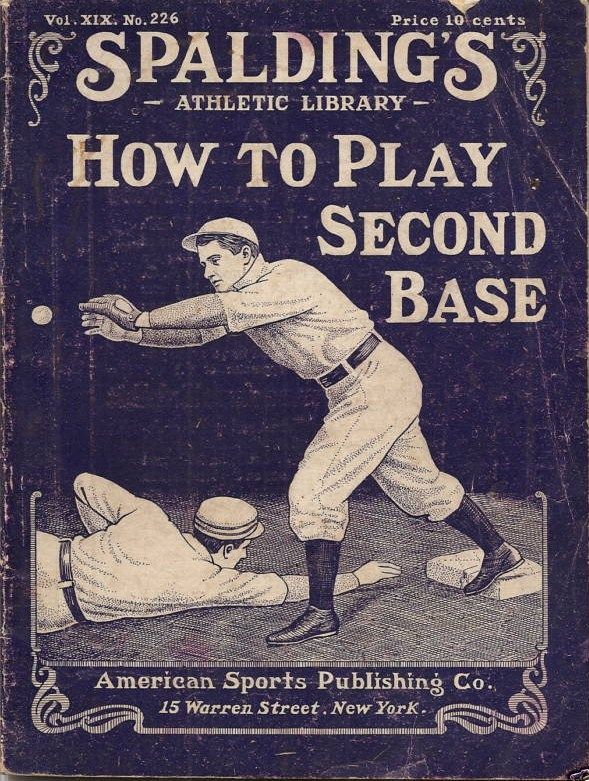
Cover of a 1905 how-to booklet

The following second basemen have been elected to the National Baseball Hall of Fame and Museum:

- Roberto Alomar
- Craig Biggio (Note: Began as a catcher and spent several years as a center fielder, but played second base for the bulk of his career)
- Rod Carew (Note: Later played at first base)
- Eddie Collins
- Bobby Doerr
- Johnny Evers
- Nellie Fox
- Frankie Frisch
- Charlie Gehringer
- Joe Gordon
- Frank Grant
- Billy Herman
- Rogers Hornsby
- Jeff Kent
- Nap Lajoie
- Tony Lazzeri
- Bill Mazeroski
- Bid McPhee
- Joe Morgan
- Paul Molitor (Note: Played second base in the early portion of his career)
- Jackie Robinson (Note: Started his career at first base, then moved to second base)
- Ryne Sandberg
- Red Schoendienst

== Multiple Gold Glove Award winners ==
- Roberto Alomar: 10
- Ryne Sandberg: 9
- Bill Mazeroski: 8
- Frank White: 8
- Joe Morgan: 5
- Bobby Richardson: 5
- Craig Biggio: 4
- Bret Boone: 4
- Bobby Grich: 4
- Orlando Hudson: 4
- Dustin Pedroia: 4
- Brandon Phillips: 4
- Luis Castillo: 3
- Nellie Fox: 3
- Davey Johnson: 3
- Bobby Knoop: 3
- Harold Reynolds: 3
- Manny Trillo: 3
- Lou Whitaker: 3
- Robinson Canó: 2
- Tommy Helms: 2
- Felix Millan: 2
- Plácido Polanco: 2
- Pokey Reese: 2
- Fernando Vina: 2

== Number of seasons with 100+ double plays turned at second base (among Hall of Fame second basemen) ==
- Bill Mazeroski: 11
- Nellie Fox: 10
- Bobby Doerr: 9
- Red Schoendienst: 8
- Charlie Gehringer: 7
- Joe Gordon: 7
- Billy Herman: 5
- Jeff Kent: 5
- Jackie Robinson: 4
- Roberto Alomar: 3
- Craig Biggio: 2
- Frankie Frisch: 2
- Rogers Hornsby: 2
- Joe Morgan: 2
- Ryne Sandberg: 2
- Tony Lazzeri: 1
- Bid McPhee: 1

Source: baseball-reference.com
