= Davis Schneider =

American baseball player (born 1999)

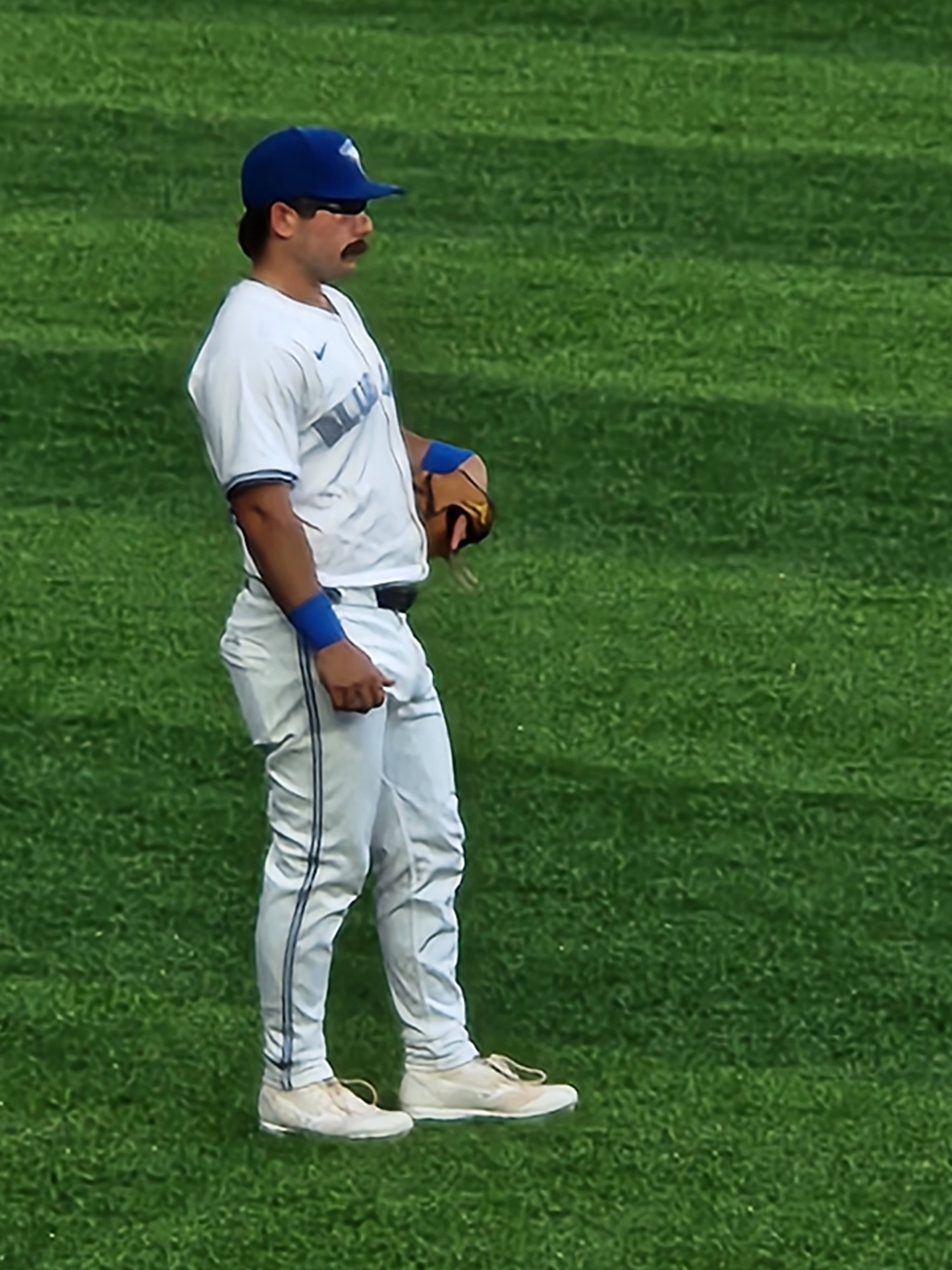
- Schneider with the Toronto Blue Jays in 2024

Free agent
- Infielder / Outfielder
- Born: January 26, 1999 (age 27); Berlin, New Jersey, U.S.
- Bats: Right Throws: Right

MLB debut
- August 4, 2023, for the Toronto Blue Jays

MLB statistics (through 2026 season)
- Batting average: .206
- Home runs: 37
- Runs batted in: 113
- Stats at Baseball Reference

Teams
- Toronto Blue Jays (2023–2026)

Davis Schneider (born January 26, 1999) is an American professional baseball infielder and outfielder who is a free agent. He has previously played in Major League Baseball (MLB) for the Toronto Blue Jays. The Blue Jays drafted him in the 28th round of the 2017 Major League Baseball draft. He made his MLB debut in 2023.

== Early life and high school ==
Schneider was born to Steve and Elena Schneider and has one brother and two sisters. He attended Eastern Regional High School in Voorhees Township, New Jersey, where his mother is a teacher. Before being drafted, he played briefly for the South Jersey Giants of the Atlantic Collegiate Baseball League (ACBL).

== Professional career ==
=== Minor leagues ===
The Toronto Blue Jays selected Schneider in the 28th round of the 2017 Major League Baseball draft on the recommendation of then-scout John Schneider (no relation). He made his professional debut that season with the Rookie-level Gulf Coast League Blue Jays, appearing in 50 games and recording a .238 batting average, four home runs, and 23 runs batted in (RBIs).

Schneider played 2018 with the Rookie Advanced Bluefield Blue Jays of the Appalachian League, and hit .233 with three home runs and 21 RBIs in 44 games. He split the 2019 season with Bluefield and the Short Season-A Vancouver Canadians, hitting .263 with six home runs and 31 RBIs. He did not play in 2020 due to the Minor League Baseball season being cancelled because of the COVID-19 pandemic.

Schneider returned in 2021 to play for the Low-A Dunedin Blue Jays and Vancouver. In 49 games, he batted .229 with nine home runs and 23 RBIs. Schneider began 2022 with Vancouver, and was later promoted to the Double-A New Hampshire Fisher Cats and Triple-A Buffalo Bisons. In a career-high 113 games, Schneider hit .253 with 16 home runs, 56 RBIs, and 16 stolen bases. He began the 2023 season with Buffalo, hitting .275 with 21 home runs, 64 RBIs, and nine stolen bases in 87 games.

=== Toronto Blue Jays ===
The Blue Jays promoted Schneider to the major leagues on August 4, 2023. In his first major league at-bat, Schneider hit a home run off James Paxton of the Boston Red Sox. He became the first player in MLB history to collect nine hits, which included two home runs, in his first three games. The nine hits matched a modern MLB record that dated back to 1901. (Note: The only other major-leaguer to record nine hits in his first three games was Coaker Triplett of the Chicago Cubs, who did it in April 1938 against the Cincinnati Reds. Triplett had two doubles and a triple, but no home runs.) Schneider set another high water mark after playing in 20 MLB games with a 1.358 OPS over that span, which was the highest in the modern era with a minimum of 70 plate appearances. Schneider donated his game-used debut uniform and gear to the Canadian Baseball Hall of Fame. He appeared in 35 games for the Blue Jays in 2023, hitting .276 with eight home runs, 20 RBIs, and a 1.008 OPS.

On May 31, 2024, Schneider hit his first career walk-off home run against the Pittsburgh Pirates, for a 14th inning 5–-3 victory.

Schneider led off Game 5 of the 2025 World Series with a first pitch home run off Dodgers pitcher Blake Snell. Vladimir Guerrero Jr. then homered two pitches later, marking the first time a team began a World Series game with back-to-back homers.

On November 20, 2026, the Blue Jays non-tendered Schneider and he became a free agent.

== Personal life ==
Schneider's brother, Steven, passed away in 2020 at the age of 26 after an accidental drug overdose.

Schneider's father Steve, who was in the audience at Dodger Stadium for Game 5 of the World Series, recorded Schneider's home run and the video went viral.

== See also ==
- List of Major League Baseball players with a home run in their first major league at bat
