= Covering a base =

Baseball term

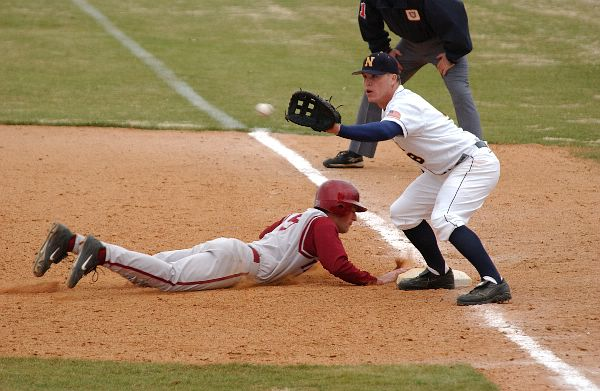
A first baseman (standing in white) covering first base during a pickoff attempt.

In baseball and softball, part of the infielders' and pitcher's jobs is to cover bases. Their role is to stand next to a base in anticipation of receiving the ball thrown from another fielder, so that they may make a play on an opposing baserunner who is approaching the base. On a force play, the fielder covering the base stands with one foot on that base.

In general, the first baseman covers first base, the second baseman or shortstop covers second, the third baseman covers third, and the catcher covers home plate. However, on ground balls hit to the first baseman away from first base, the pitcher will cover first base instead. On a ground ball to either the shortstop or the second baseman, the other of those will cover second base.

With a runner on first base, when a ground ball is hit to the third baseman, second base will be covered by the second baseman, because unlike the shortstop, he does not have to turn his back to the third baseman in order to get to second base. Likewise, with a runner on first base, when a ground ball is hit to the first baseman, second base will be covered by the shortstop, who unlike the second baseman, does not have to turn his back toward the first baseman in order to get to second base.

When a runner on first base attempts to steal second base, the shortstop and second baseman will have arranged in advance which one will cover second base to receive the ball from the catcher. Likewise, when the pitcher attempts to pick off a runner at second base, the shortstop and second baseman will have arranged in advance which one will cover second base.

With baserunners on first and second bases, sometimes the shortstop will cover third base on a bunt, a coverage plan known as the "rotation play" or "wheelplay." This occurs if the batter bunts the ball toward third base so that the third baseman cannot cover third base because he is moving forward to field the ball.

If the defense is employing an extreme shift, with the shortstop playing on the first-base side of second base and with the third baseman playing near second base (because by reputation the batter is anticipated to hit the ball to the right side of the infield), in some cases the pitcher may need to cover third base.

When the pitcher throws a wild pitch, or when the catcher permits a passed ball, so that in either case the catcher has to retreat further into foul territory away from home plate to retrieve the ball, if there is a runner on third base the pitcher will cover home plate.

Depending on the situation, however, various fielders can cover any base, and sometimes even an outfielder can cover a base.

== Figurative expression ==
In American English, the expression "cover your bases" used outside of a baseball setting means to be thoroughly prepared for something.
