= 2025 Toronto Blue Jays season =

Major League Baseball season

2025 Toronto Blue Jays
- American League champions American League East champions
- League: American League
- Division: East
- Ballpark: Rogers Centre
- City: Toronto, Ontario
- Record: 94–68 (.580)
- Divisional place: 1st
- Owners: Rogers
- President: Mark Shapiro (also CEO)
- General manager: Ross Atkins
- Manager: John Schneider
- Television: Sportsnet; Sportsnet One
- Radio: Blue Jays Radio Network; Sportsnet 590 the FAN

The 2025 Toronto Blue Jays season was the 49th season of the Toronto Blue Jays franchise, and the Blue Jays' 34th full season (36th overall) at Rogers Centre. The Blue Jays dramatically improved upon their last place record, 74-88, from last season with a first-place record of 94-68. The season was the third time the Blue Jays won the American League pennant, advancing to the 2025 World Series against the defending champ Los Angeles Dodgers, their third appearance in franchise history and first since 1993. The season ended with their first World Series loss in franchise history, falling to the Dodgers in seven games with Game 7 going into extra innings at home.

On August 22, the Blue Jays won their 75th game, guaranteeing a better total than their 74–88 record from the previous season following a 5–2 victory over the Miami Marlins.

On September 21, the Blue Jays clinched a return to the postseason after a one-year absence with an 8–5 win over the Kansas City Royals. On September 28, the Blue Jays won the American League East division for the first time since 2015 by virtue of a head-to-head tiebreaker against the New York Yankees, 8–5, with a 13–4 victory against the Tampa Bay Rays in their final regular season game, a first-round bye, and home-field advantage throughout the American League playoffs. The team won the Division Series with home-field advantage against the fourth seed New York Yankees, victors of the Wild Card Series over archrival Boston Red Sox, earning the team their first American League Championship Series appearance since 2016. On October 20, the Blue Jays defeated the Seattle Mariners at home in seven games in the 2025 ALCS to advance to the 2025 World Series. In that series, they faced the defending champion Los Angeles Dodgers, which the Blue Jays lost in seven games.

After the season, Buck Martinez, Blue Jays' color analyst since 1987, announced his retirement.

The Toronto Blue Jays drew an average home attendance of 35,184, the 9th-highest of all MLB teams.

== Offseason ==
The Blue Jays offseason began with Ryan Yarbrough and Génesis Cabrera electing free agency. Braydon Fisher was signed on a minor league deal on November 18. On November 22, they non-tendered former All-Star closer Jordan Romano, after he posted a 6.59 ERA in 2024 while dealing with elbow issues, avoiding a projected $7.75 million salary. They also non-tendered Dillon Tate. On December 3rd, the Blue Jays signed Michael Stefanic to a minor league contract.

The first major move of the offseason came on December 10, when the Blue Jays traded Spencer Horwitz and minor league outfielder Nick Mitchell to the Cleveland Guardians for former All-Star and 3x Gold Glove winner Andrés Giménez, and reliever Nick Sandlin. The Guardians traded Gimenez after underwhelming offensive performance, and to get rid of his 7-year $106.5 million contract extension signed in 2023. Later that same day, the Guardians would go on to trade Horwitz to the Pittsburgh Pirates for Luis Ortiz, Michael Kennedy and Josh Hartle.

On December 11, the Blue Jays selected Angel Bastardo in the Rule 5 Draft from the Boston Red Sox. Bastardo spent the entire 2025 season on the injured list recovering from Tommy John surgery. The Blue Jays signed their first major league free agent on December 13, bringing back relief pitcher Yimi García on a 2-year, $15 million contract. They had previously traded him at the 2024 trade deadline to the Seattle Mariners for Jonatan Clase and catcher Jacob Sharp. On December 20, the Blue Jays signed Josh Walker to a major league deal, and signed Eric Lauer and Ali Sánchez to minor league contracts.

The Blue Jays were also rumoured to be among the finalists for top free agents Juan Soto and Corbin Burnes, offering around $700 million for Soto and offering more to Burnes than the Arizona Diamondbacks, who ended up signing him, did.

On January 10, the Blue Jays signed all-star closer Jeff Hoffman to a 3-year $33 million contract. There were rumours of Hoffman attempting to become a starter, however Jays GM Ross Atkins confirmed Hoffman was signed as a reliever. This move came a day after Jordan Romano signed with the Philadelphia Phillies, essentially completing a closer swap between the two teams. The Jays originally drafted Hoffman in the first round of the 2014 Major League Baseball draft before trading him for Troy Tulowitzki in 2015.

On January 15, the Blue Jays traded Brett de Geus to the Pirates for cash considerations. On January 17th, with the Jays looking to sign top international free agent Roki Sasaki, they traded a player to be named later to the Guardians for Myles Straw, international bonus pool money, and cash. Similar to Gimenez, Straw provided elite defense, but underperformed offensively and had an unsavoury contract, owed $13.8 million over the last two years of the contract. After missing out on Sasaki, the Jays signed 17 international free agents on January 18, most notably shortstops Christopher Polanco and Juan Sanchez.

On January 20, the Blue Jays signed outfielder Anthony Santander to a 5-year, $92.5 million contract. Coming off a 44-home run season with the Baltimore Orioles, Santander was one of the premier free agents available, and was expected to be a weapon batting behind star first baseman Vladimir Guerrero Jr.. On January 22, the Jays signed Dicky Lovelady to a minor league contract.

On February 4, the Jays signed legendary pitcher Max Scherzer to a one-year, $15.5 million deal. At the time, Scherzer was an 8-time all-star, 3-time Cy Young winner, and 2-time World Series champion. Scherzer was expected to play an important role beyond the mound, including mentoring younger pitchers such as Trey Yesavage. On February 17, the Blue Jays signed Jacob Barnes to a minor league deal. On February 21, they brought Ryan Yarbrough back on a minor league deal. They would also bring back Dillon Tate on a major league contract on March 12.

== Standings ==
=== American League East ===
AL East
Team	W	L	Pct.	GB	Home	Road
Toronto Blue Jays	94	68	.580	—	54‍–‍27	40‍–‍41
New York Yankees	94	68	.580	—	50‍–‍31	44‍–‍37
Boston Red Sox	89	73	.549	5	48‍–‍33	41‍–‍40
Tampa Bay Rays	77	85	.475	17	41‍–‍40	36‍–‍45
Baltimore Orioles	75	87	.463	19	39‍–‍42	36‍–‍45

=== American League Wild Card ===
Division leaders
Team	W	L	Pct.
Toronto Blue Jays	94	68	.580
Seattle Mariners	90	72	.556
Cleveland Guardians	88	74	.543

Wild Card teams (Top 3 teams qualify for postseason)
Team	W	L	Pct.	GB
New York Yankees	94	68	.580	+7
Boston Red Sox	89	73	.549	+2
Detroit Tigers	87	75	.537	—
Houston Astros	87	75	.537	—
Kansas City Royals	82	80	.506	5
Texas Rangers	81	81	.500	6
Tampa Bay Rays	77	85	.475	10
Athletics	76	86	.469	11
Baltimore Orioles	75	87	.463	12
Los Angeles Angels	72	90	.444	15
Minnesota Twins	70	92	.432	17
Chicago White Sox	60	102	.370	27

== Record vs. opponents ==
	Record			Games Left		
Opponent	Home	Road	Total	Home	Road	Total
AL East
Baltimore Orioles	5–2	2–4	7–6	–	–	–
Boston Red Sox	3–3	5–2	8–5	–	–	–
New York Yankees	6–1	2–4	8–5	–	–	–
Tampa Bay Rays	4–2	2–5	6–7	–	–	–
Totals	18–8	11–15	29–23	–	–	–
AL Central
Chicago White Sox	1–2	2–1	3–3	–	–	–
Cleveland Guardians	1–2	2–1	3–3	–	–	–
Detroit Tigers	1–2	3–1	4–3	–	–	–
Kansas City Royals	1–2	1–2	2–4	–	–	–
Minnesota Twins	2–1	2–1	4–2	–	–	–
Totals	6–9	10–6	16–15	–	–	–
AL West
Houston Astros	2–1	0–3	2–4	–	–	–
Los Angeles Angels	3–0	1–2	4–2	–	–	–
Athletics	4–0	1–2	5–2	–	–	–
Seattle Mariners	1–2	3–0	4–2	–	–	–
Texas Rangers	2–1	2–1	4–2	–	–	–
Totals	12–4	7–8	19–12	–	–	–
National League
Arizona Diamondbacks	2–1	–	2–1	–	–	–
Atlanta Braves	2–1	–	2–1	–	–	–
Chicago Cubs	2–1	–	2–1	–	–	–
Cincinnati Reds	–	2–1	2–1	–	–	–
Colorado Rockies	–	3–0	3–0	–	–	–
Los Angeles Dodgers	–	1–2	1–2	–	–	–
Miami Marlins	–	2–1	2–1	–	–	–
Milwaukee Brewers	1–2	–	1–2	–	–	–
New York Mets	–	0–3	0–3	–	–	–
Philadelphia Phillies	2–1	0–3	2–4	–	–	–
Pittsburgh Pirates	–	1–2	1–2	–	–	–
San Diego Padres	3–0	–	3–0	–	–	–
San Francisco Giants	3–0	–	3–0	–	–	–
St. Louis Cardinals	–	3–0	3–0	–	–	–
Washington Nationals	3–0	–	3–0	–	–	–
Totals	18–6	12–12	30–18	–	–	–
Grand Totals	54–27	40–41	94–68	–	–	–

Month	Games	Won	Lost	Pct.
March	5	3	2	.600
April	25	11	14	.440
May	28	16	12	.571
June	26	16	10	.615
July	26	18	8	.692
August	27	15	12	.556
September	25	15	10	.600
Totals	162	94	68	.580

== Regular season ==
=== Opening Day ===
Opening Day starters
Position	Name
Catcher	Alejandro Kirk
First baseman	Vladimir Guerrero Jr.
Second baseman	Andrés Giménez
Shortstop	Bo Bichette
Third baseman	Ernie Clement
Left fielder	Anthony Santander
Center fielder	George Springer
Right fielder	Alan Roden
Designated hitter	Will Wagner
Pitcher	José Berríos

=== March and April ===
The Blue Jays began the 2025 season at home against the Baltimore Orioles, splitting a four-game series with one of their AL East rivals. Offseason acquisition Max Scherzer was injured in his start on March 29, and was placed on the injured list. The Washington Nationals were swept by the Jays in the next series, with Easton Lucas taking Scherzer's rotation spot and pitching five scoreless innings in the finale. Traveling to Queens for their first road trip of 2025, the Blue Jays were swept by the New York Mets over a three-game series.

On April 7, the Blue Jays signed Vladimir Guerrero Jr. to a 14-year, $500 million contract extension. The extension is the largest contract in franchise history, eclipsing the six-year, $150 million contract issued to George Springer, and is the second-largest contract in MLB history in present-day value and the highest for a one-team professional athlete in any team sport. Heading to Boston, Toronto nearly swept the Boston Red Sox before falling in extra innings in the final game of the series. After the game, manager John Schneider criticized home plate umpire Manny Gonzalez, saying "It's tough to battle nine hitters and an umpire... I've got all the respect in the world for them, but it wasn't a great day for him behind the plate." To close their road trip, the Blue Jays went to Baltimore. The first game of the series was rained out (and was made up as a doubleheader in late July), and the teams split the other two games of the series.

=== June ===
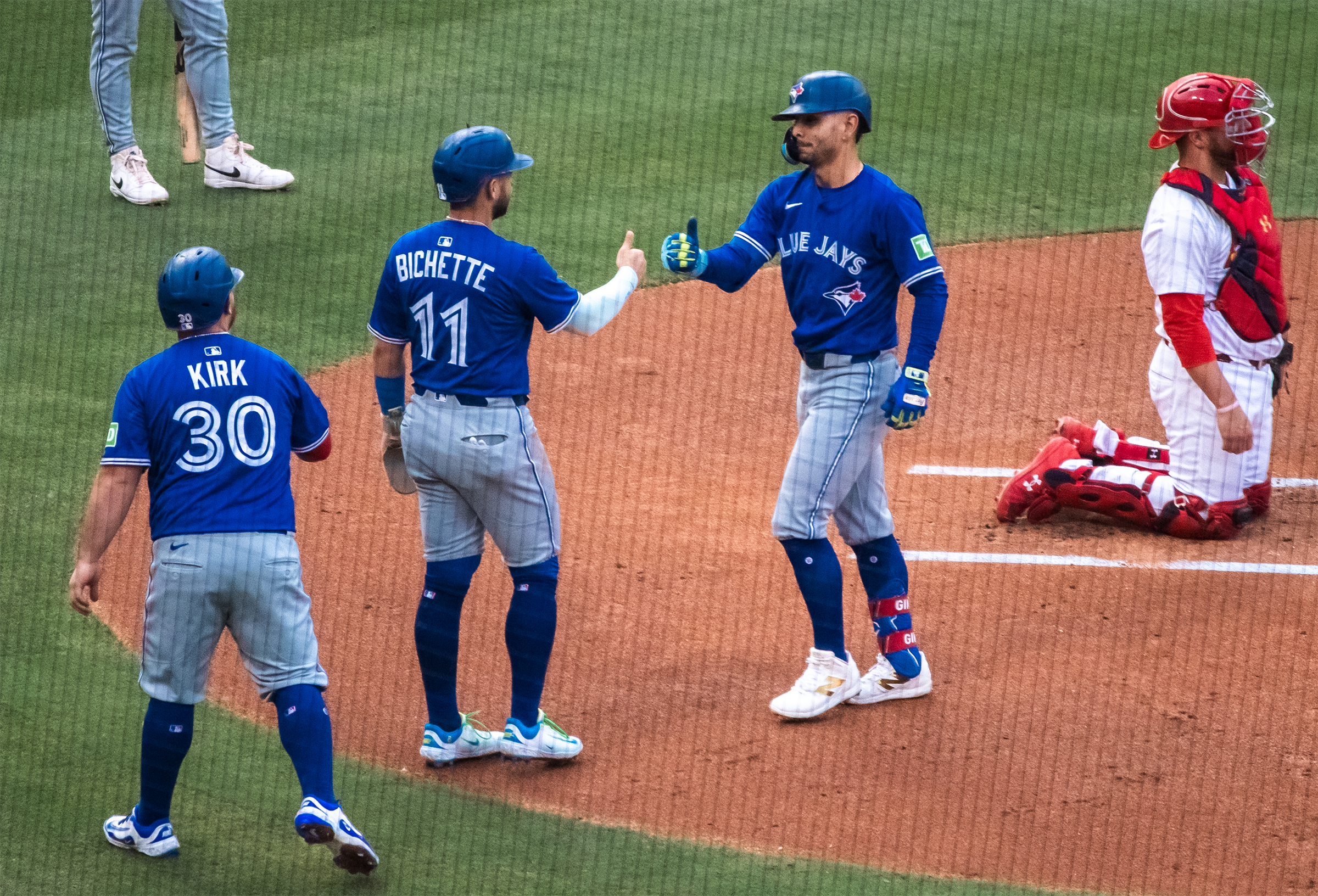
Kirk and Bichette score on a three-run homer by Giménez in St. Louis.

The Blue Jays began June by concluding a four-game sweep of the Athletics at home. They followed that by winning two of three from the Philadelphia Phillies at home. Next, they won two of three against the Minnesota Twins at Target Field. The Blue Jays followed that up by sweeping the St. Louis Cardinals in a three-game set on the road, resulting in their 12th win in 14 games and brought their record to 38–30.

=== July ===
From June 30 to July 3, the Blue Jays won all four games against the New York Yankees at home and by doing so, overtook them for first place in the AL East. On July 21, the Blue Jays set a franchise record by winning their 11th straight game at home, beating the Yankees in the first game of another three-game set against them.

The Blue Jays then traded for relief pitcher Seranthony Domínguez from the Baltimore Orioles, starting pitcher Shane Bieber from the Cleveland Guardians, and Louis Varland and Ty France from the Minnesota Twins before the trade deadline. The Blue Jays traded away Will Wagner.

=== August ===
On August 6, the Blue Jays set another franchise record and the MLB record by recording 63 hits in a three-game series against the Colorado Rockies in Coors Field and also established a franchise mark with 45 runs in the three-game set.

=== September ===
The Blue Jays clinched the postseason on September 21 after beating the Kansas City Royals in Kauffman Stadium. The Blue Jays continued their poor run of form in late September allowing the New York Yankees to tie the Blue Jays' win total, with the Blue Jays remaining the division leader due to the season series tiebreaker as the Blue Jays have a head-to-head record of 8–5 over the Yankees. Following a subsequent sweep of the Tampa Bay Rays, the Blue Jays clinched the Division Title in front of a home crowd on the last game of the regular season, despite having a tied overall record with the Yankees.

== Game log ==
Legend
Blue Jays win	Blue Jays loss	Game postponed	Clinched playoff spot	Clinched division

2025 Game Log: 94–68 (Home: 54–27; Away: 40–41)
March: 3–2 (Home: 3–2; Away: 0–0)

#	Date	Opponent	Score	Win	Loss	Save	Attendance	Record	GB
1	March 27	Orioles	2–12	Eflin (1–0)	Berríos (0–1)	—	40,734	0–1	1
2	March 28	Orioles	8–2	Gausman (1–0)	Morton (0–1)	—	26,289	1–1	½
3	March 29	Orioles	5–9	Kremer (1–0)	Lovelady (0–1)	—	27,005	1–2	1½
4	March 30	Orioles	3–1	Bassitt (1–0)	Sugano (0–1)	Hoffman (1)	21,069	2–2	1½
5	March 31	Nationals	5–2	Francis (1–0)	Soroka (0–1)	García (1)	20,137	3–2	1

April: 11–14 (Home: 6–4; Away: 5–10)

#	Date	Opponent	Score	Win	Loss	Save	Attendance	Record	GB
6	April 1	Nationals	5–3	Green (1–0)	Ferrer (0–1)	Hoffman (2)	21,845	4–2	½
7	April 2	Nationals	4–2	Lucas (1–0)	Gore (0–1)	Hoffman (3)	20,104	5–2	+½
8	April 4	@ Mets	0–5	Megill (2–0)	Gausman (1–1)	—	43,945	5–3	½
9	April 5	@ Mets	2–3	Díaz (1–0)	Sandlin (0–1)	—	37,694	5–4	1½
10	April 6	@ Mets	1–2	Kranick (1–0)	Francis (1–1)	Díaz (2)	40,132	5–5	1½
11	April 7	@ Red Sox	6–2	Berríos (1–1)	Fitts (0–2)	—	25,788	6–5	½
12	April 8	@ Red Sox	6–1	Lucas (2–0)	Crochet (1–1)	—	25,575	7–5	+½
13	April 9	@ Red Sox	2–1 (11)	Hoffman (1–0)	Winckowski (0–1)	Sandlin (1)	29,441	8–5	+½
14	April 10	@ Red Sox	3–4 (10)	Bernardino (1–0)	Sandlin (0–2)	—	25,128	8–6	–
–	April 11	@ Orioles	Postponed due to rain. Makeup date July 29.						
15	April 12	@ Orioles	4–5	Baker (1–0)	Francis (1–2)	Bautista (1)	22,130	8–7	½
16	April 13	@ Orioles	7–6 (10)	Hoffman (2–0)	Bowman (0–1)	—	27,193	9–7	+½
17	April 14	Braves	4–8	Holmes (1–1)	Lucas (2–1)	—	21,595	9–8	½
18	April 15	Braves	6–3	Gausman (2–1)	Schwellenbach (1–1)	—	26,979	10–8	½
19	April 16	Braves	3–1	Bassitt (2–0)	Strider (0–1)	Hoffman (4)	25,328	11–8	½
20	April 18	Mariners	3–1	Francis (2–2)	Woo (2–1)	Hoffman (5)	40,263	12–8	1
21	April 19	Mariners	4–8 (12)	Muñoz (1–0)	Barnes (0–1)	—	36,775	12–9	1
22	April 20	Mariners	3–8	Castillo (2–2)	Lucas (2–2)	—	25,752	12–10	2
23	April 21	@ Astros	0–7	Brown (3–1)	Gausman (2–2)	—	28,219	12–11	2
24	April 22	@ Astros	1–5	Blanco (2–2)	Bassitt (2–1)	—	29,825	12–12	2
25	April 23	@ Astros	1–3	Gusto (3–1)	Francis (2–3)	Hader (7)	25,209	12–13	3
26	April 25	@ Yankees	4–2	Fluharty (1–0)	Williams (0–2)	Hoffman (6)	46,081	13–13	2
―	April 26	@ Yankees	Postponed due to rain. Makeup date April 27.						
27	April 27	@ Yankees	2–11	Fried (5–0)	Gausman (2–3)	—	see 2nd game	13–14	3
28	April 27	@ Yankees	1–5	Hill (3–0)	Bassitt (2–2)	—	43,824	13–15	4
29	April 29	Red Sox	2–10	Crochet (3–2)	Francis (2–4)	—	28,045	13–16	4½
30	April 30	Red Sox	7–6 (10)	Hoffman (3–0)	Slaten (0–1)	—	26,498	14–16	3½

May: 16–12 (Home: 10–6; Road: 6–6)

#	Date	Opponent	Score	Win	Loss	Save	Attendance	Record	GB
31	May 1	Red Sox	4–2	Fluharty (2–0)	Slaten (0–2)	García (2)	24,198	15–16	3
32	May 2	Guardians	5–3	Little (1–0)	Junis (0–1)	Hoffman (7)	26,087	16–16	3
33	May 3	Guardians	3–5	Allard (2–0)	García (0–1)	Clase (6)	40,507	16–17	3
34	May 4	Guardians	4–5	Bibee (3–2)	Francis (2–5)	Clase (7)	30,641	16–18	3
35	May 6	@ Angels	3–8	Neris (1–1)	García (0–2)	—	25,867	16–19	3½
36	May 7	@ Angels	4–5	Burke (3–0)	Hoffman (3–1)	—	26,646	16–20	4½
37	May 8	@ Angels	8–5	Bassitt (3–2)	Johnson (1–1)	Green (1)	26,245	17–20	4
38	May 9	@ Mariners	6–3	Gausman (3–3)	Castillo (3–3)	Hoffman (8)	31,564	18–20	4
39	May 10	@ Mariners	6–3	Fluharty (3–0)	Vargas (1–2)	Hoffman (9)	31,182	19–20	3
40	May 11	@ Mariners	9–1	Lauer (1–0)	Miller (2–4)	—	36,823	20–20	3
41	May 13	Rays	9–11	Uceta (3–1)	Hoffman (3–2)	Montgomery (1)	27,717	20–21	3½
42	May 14	Rays	3–1	Little (2–0)	Pepiot (2–5)	García (3)	22,314	21–21	3½
43	May 15	Rays	3–8	Littell (3–5)	Gausman (3–4)	—	22,856	21–22	4
44	May 16	Tigers	4–5	Flaherty (2–5)	Francis (2–6)	Brieske (1)	23,146	21–23	5
45	May 17	Tigers	2–1	Hoffman (4–2)	Hanifee (2–1)	—	40,171	22–23	4
46	May 18	Tigers	2–3	Jobe (4–0)	Fluharty (3–1)	Vest (5)	36,064	22–24	5
47	May 20	Padres	3–0	Bassitt (4–2)	Cease (1–3)	Hoffman (10)	23,597	23–24	5
48	May 21	Padres	14–0	Gausman (4–4)	Vásquez (3–4)	—	23,266	24–24	5
49	May 22	Padres	7–6 (11)	Fisher (1–0)	Estrada (1–3)	—	33,971	25–24	5
50	May 23	@ Rays	1–3	Rasmussen (3–4)	Lauer (1–1)	Fairbanks (9)	10,046	25–25	5
51	May 24	@ Rays	1–3	Baz (4–3)	Berríos (1–2)	Fairbanks (10)	10,046	25–26	6
52	May 25	@ Rays	0–13	Pepiot (3–5)	Bassitt (4–3)	—	10,046	25–27	7
53	May 26	@ Rangers	2–1	Gausman (5–4)	deGrom (4–2)	Hoffman (11)	33,766	26–27	7
54	May 27	@ Rangers	0–2	Jackson (1–4)	Green (1–1)	Garcia (3)	25,818	26–28	8
55	May 28	@ Rangers	2–0	Little (3–0)	Webb (2–3)	Hoffman (12)	20,811	27–28	8
56	May 29	Athletics	12–0	Berríos (2–2)	Lopez (0–3)	—	23,853	28–28	7½
57	May 30	Athletics	11–7	Bassitt (5–3)	Springs (5–4)	—	36,951	29–28	6½
58	May 31	Athletics	8–7	Lucas (3–2)	Hoglund (1–3)	Hoffman (13)	38,017	30–28	5½

June: 16–10 (Home: 7–4; Road: 9–6)

#	Date	Opponent	Score	Win	Loss	Save	Attendance	Record	GB
59	June 1	Athletics	8–4	Swanson (1–0)	Sterner (1–2)	—	30,130	31–28	5½
60	June 3	Phillies	3–8	Sánchez (5–1)	Francis (2–7)	—	32,632	31–29	6½
61	June 4	Phillies	2–1	Hoffman (5–2)	Romano (0–2)	—	25,716	32–29	5½
62	June 5	Phillies	9–1	Bassitt (6–3)	Luzardo (5–2)	—	33,728	33–29	5½
63	June 6	@ Twins	6–4	Lauer (2–1)	Ober (4–2)	Hoffman (14)	26,847	34–29	5½
64	June 7	@ Twins	5–4	Green (2–1)	Jax (1–4)	Hoffman (15)	23,476	35–29	4½
65	June 8	@ Twins	3–6	Ryan (7–2)	Francis (2–8)	Durán (10)	22,078	35–30	4½
66	June 9	@ Cardinals	5–4 (10)	Rodríguez (1–0)	Maton (0–2)	Hoffman (16)	30,851	36–30	4
67	June 10	@ Cardinals	10–9	Bassitt (7–3)	Mikolas (4–3)	Hoffman (17)	29,278	37–30	4
68	June 11	@ Cardinals	5–2	Turnbull (1–0)	Liberatore (3–6)	Rodríguez (1)	28,530	38–30	4
69	June 13	@ Phillies	0–8	Suárez (5–1)	Gausman (5–5)	—	40,596	38–31	4½
70	June 14	@ Phillies	2–3	Kerkering (5–2)	Green (2–2)	Strahm (3)	43,711	38–32	4½
71	June 15	@ Phillies	4–11	Wheeler (7–2)	Berríos (2–3)	—	44,681	38–33	4½
72	June 17	Diamondbacks	5–4	Hoffman (6–2)	Miller (3–2)	—	38,537	39–33	3
73	June 18	Diamondbacks	8–1	Lauer (3–1)	Rodríguez (2–4)	—	27,635	40–33	2
74	June 19	Diamondbacks	5–9	Nelson (4–2)	Gausman (5–6)	—	33,978	40–34	3
75	June 20	White Sox	1–7	Alexander (4–7)	Turnbull (1–1)	—	36,121	40–35	3
76	June 21	White Sox	7–1	Berríos (3–3)	Civale (1–4)	—	41,488	41–35	3
77	June 22	White Sox	2–4	Leasure (2–4)	Little (3–1)	Taylor (1)	38,893	41–36	4
78	June 24	@ Guardians	10–6	Lauer (4–1)	Allen (5–5)	—	22,525	42–36	2½
79	June 25	@ Guardians	4–5 (10)	Enright (1–0)	Fluharty (3–2)	—	23,849	42–37	3½
80	June 26	@ Guardians	6–0	Gausman (6–6)	Bibee (4–8)	—	26,217	43–37	3
81	June 27	@ Red Sox	9–0	Berríos (4–3)	Bello (3–3)	—	35,719	44–37	3
82	June 28	@ Red Sox	1–15	Giolito (4–1)	Bassitt (7–4)	—	34,927	44–38	3
83	June 29	@ Red Sox	5–3	Rodríguez (2–0)	Buehler (5–6)	Hoffman (18)	35,214	45–38	3
84	June 30	Yankees	5–4	Little (4–1)	Leiter Jr. (4–5)	Hoffman (19)	40,619	46–38	2

July: 18–8 (Home: 11–1; Road: 7–7)

#	Date	Opponent	Score	Win	Loss	Save	Attendance	Record	GB
85	July 1	Yankees	12–5	Fisher (2–0)	Leiter Jr. (4–6)	—	41,129	47–38	1
86	July 2	Yankees	11–9	García (1–2)	Williams (2–3)	Hoffman (20)	30,985	48–38	—
87	July 3	Yankees	8–5	Bassitt (8–4)	Beeter (0–1)	Hoffman (21)	36,848	49–38	+1
88	July 4	Angels	4–3 (10)	Green (3–2)	Bachman (1–2)	—	30,119	50–38	+2
89	July 5	Angels	4–3 (11)	Fisher (3–0)	Zeferjahn (5–3)	—	37,269	51–38	+3
90	July 6	Angels	3–2	Burr (1–0)	Anderson (2–6)	Hoffman (22)	40,114	52–38	+3
91	July 7	@ White Sox	8–4	Berríos (5–3)	Burke (4–8)	—	13,292	53–38	+3½
92	July 8	@ White Sox	6–1 (6)	Bassitt (9–4)	Civale (1–6)	—	13,027	54–38	+3½
93	July 9	@ White Sox	1–2	Houser (1–0)	Lauer (4–2)	Leasure (2)	11,123	54–39	+2½
94	July 11	@ Athletics	7–6	Scherzer (1–0)	Severino (2–11)	―	7,950	55–39	+2
95	July 12	@ Athletics	3–4	Lopez (3–5)	Gausman (6–7)	Miller (18)	8,738	55–40	+2
96	July 13	@ Athletics	3–6	Springs (8–6)	Berríos (5–4)	Miller (19)	8,884	55–41	+2
95th All-Star Game in Cumberland, Georgia
97	July 18	Giants	4–0	Bassitt (10–4)	Verlander (0–8)	—	41,339	56–41	+3
98	July 19	Giants	6–3	Lauer (5–2)	Webb (9–7)	Hoffman (23)	42,015	57–41	+3
99	July 20	Giants	8–6	Berríos (6–4)	Ray (9–4)	Rodríguez (2)	41,693	58–41	+3
100	July 21	Yankees	4–1	Gausman (7–7)	Rodón (10–7)	Hoffman (24)	41,788	59–41	+4
101	July 22	Yankees	4–5	Hamilton (2–1)	Hoffman (6–3)	Williams (15)	42,326	59–42	+3
102	July 23	Yankees	8–4	Bassitt (11–4)	Fried (11–4)	—	42,143	60–42	+4
103	July 24	@ Tigers	11–4	Lauer (6–2)	Olson (4–4)	—	30,051	61–42	+4½
104	July 25	@ Tigers	6–2	Berríos (7–4)	Montero (4–3)	—	37,820	62–42	+5½
105	July 26	@ Tigers	6–1	Fisher (4–0)	Vest (5–2)	—	40,528	63–42	+6½
106	July 27	@ Tigers	4–10	Flaherty (6–10)	Scherzer (1–1)	—	36,053	63–43	+5½
107	July 28	@ Orioles	4–11	Martin (1–0)	Bassitt (11–5)	—	20,176	63–44	+5½
108	July 29	@ Orioles (game 1)	4–16	Morton (7–8)	Lucas (3–3)	—	16,194	63–45	+5
109	July 29	@ Orioles (game 2)	2–3	Kittredge (2–2)	Hoffman (6–4)	Martin (1)	14,929	63–46	+4
110	July 30	@ Orioles	9–8	Fluharty (4–2)	Canó (1–6)	Hoffman (25)	17,049	64–46	+4

August: 15–12 (Home: 8–7; Road: 7–5)

#	Date	Opponent	Score	Win	Loss	Save	Attendance	Record	GB
111	August 1	Royals	3–9	Wacha (5–9)	Gausman (7–8)	—	41,492	64–47	+3½
112	August 2	Royals	4–2	Scherzer (2–1)	Cameron (5–5)	Hoffman (26)	41,842	65–47	+4
113	August 3	Royals	4–7 (10)	Harvey (1–0)	Domínguez (2–4)	—	41,461	65–48	+3
114	August 4	@ Rockies	15–1	Lauer (7–2)	Gordon (2–4)	—	22,075	66–48	+3
115	August 5	@ Rockies	10–4	Berríos (8–4)	Molina (0–1)	—	25,141	67–48	+3
116	August 6	@ Rockies	20–1	Gausman (8–8)	Freeland (2–12)	—	21,749	68–48	+4
117	August 8	@ Dodgers	1–5	Kershaw (6–2)	Scherzer (2–2)	—	53,825	68–49	+3
118	August 9	@ Dodgers	1–9	Snell (2–1)	Bassitt (11–6)	—	44,727	68–50	+3
119	August 10	@ Dodgers	5–4	Hoffman (7–4)	Vesia (2–2)	Fluharty (1)	41,557	69–50	+4
120	August 12	Cubs	5–1	Berríos (9–4)	Assad (0–1)	—	43,003	70–50	+4½
121	August 13	Cubs	1–4	Horton (7–3)	Gausman (8–9)	Palencia (16)	43,120	70–51	+4½
122	August 14	Cubs	2–1	Scherzer (3–2)	Boyd (11–6)	Hoffman (27)	43,270	71–51	+5
123	August 15	Rangers	6–5	Hoffman (8–4)	Maton (2–5)		42,260	72–51	+5
124	August 16	Rangers	14–2	Lauer (8–2)	Corbin (6–9)	—	42,686	73–51	+5
125	August 17	Rangers	4–10	Eovaldi (11–3)	Berríos (9–5)	Armstrong (4)	42,549	73–52	+5
126	August 18	@ Pirates	2–5	Sisk (1–1)	Rodríguez (2–1)	Santana (8)	17,477	73–53	+5
127	August 19	@ Pirates	7–3	Scherzer (4–2)	Keller (5–12)	—	14,282	74–53	+5
128	August 20	@ Pirates	1–2	Oviedo (1–0)	Bassitt (11–7)	Santana (9)	14,019	74–54	+4
129	August 22	@ Marlins	5–2	Bieber (1–0)	Gusto (7–6)	Hoffman (28)	14,923	75–54	+5
130	August 23	@ Marlins	7–6 (12)	Nance (1–0)	Faucher (3–4)	Little (1)	24,943	76–54	+5
131	August 24	@ Marlins	3–5	Pérez (6–3)	Gausman (8–10)	Phillips (2)	20,620	76–55	+5
132	August 25	Twins	10–4	Scherzer (5–2)	Ryan (12–7)	—	41,845	77–55	+5
133	August 26	Twins	5–7	Tonkin (2–0)	Hoffman (8–5)	Topa (4)	42,235	77–56	+4
134	August 27	Twins	9–8	Domínguez (3–4)	Tonkin (2–1)	Hoffman (29)	42,361	78–56	+4
135	August 29	Brewers	2–7	Peralta (16–5)	Bieber (1–1)	—	41,390	78–57	+3
136	August 30	Brewers	1–4	Ashby (3–1)	Hoffman (8–6)	Uribe (4)	41,424	78–58	+2
137	August 31	Brewers	8–4	Nance (2–0)	Woodruff (5–2)	—	41,488	79–58	+3

September: 15–10 (Home: 9–3; Road: 6–7)

#	Date	Opponent	Score	Win	Loss	Save	Attendance	Record	GB
138	September 1	@ Reds	4–5	Zulueta (1–0)	Little (4–2)	—	21,773	79–59	+2½
139	September 2	@ Reds	12–9	Varland (4–3)	Barlow (6–3)	Hoffman (30)	20,769	80–59	+2½
140	September 3	@ Reds	13–9	Bieber (2–1)	Martinez (10–11)	—	17,134	81–59	+3½
141	September 5	@ Yankees	7–1	Gausman (9–10)	Schlittler (2–3)	—	46,055	82–59	+4
142	September 6	@ Yankees	1–3	Gil (3–1)	Bassitt (11–8)	Bednar (21)	45,123	82–60	+3
143	September 7	@ Yankees	3–4	Fried (16–5)	Scherzer (5–3)	Bednar (22)	43,266	82–61	+2
144	September 9	Astros	4–3 (10)	Hoffman (9–6)	Kimbrel (0–1)	—	40,252	83–61	+3
145	September 10	Astros	2–3	De Los Santos (6–3)	Hoffman (9–7)	Abreu (5)	36,760	83–62	+3
146	September 11	Astros	6–0	Gausman (10–10)	Javier (1–3)	—	41,224	84–62	+3
147	September 12	Orioles	6–1	Fisher (5–0)	Enns (3–3)	—	34,376	85–62	+3
148	September 13	Orioles	5–4	Fisher (6–0)	Canó (3–7)	—	42,461	86–62	+3
149	September 14	Orioles	11–2	Bieber (3–1)	Wolfram (3–1)	—	42,032	87–62	+4
150	September 15	@ Rays	2–1 (11)	Fisher (7–0)	Kelly (4–2)	—	8,972	88–62	+5
151	September 16	@ Rays	6–5	Lauer (9–2)	Pepiot (11–11)	Hoffman (31)	8,908	89–62	+5
152	September 17	@ Rays	1–2	Seymour (4–2)	Rodríguez (2–2)	Fairbanks (27)	8,959	89–63	+4
153	September 18	@ Rays	0–4	Baz (10–12)	Bassitt (11–9)	—	8,042	89–64	+3
154	September 19	@ Royals	1–20	Lorenzen (6–11)	Scherzer (5–4)	—	26,459	89–65	+3
155	September 20	@ Royals	1–2	Cameron (9–7)	Bieber (3–2)	Estévez (41)	25,774	89–66	+2
156	September 21	@ Royals	8–5	Domínguez (4–4)	Wacha (9–13)	Hoffman (32)	32,936	90–66	+2
157	September 23	Red Sox	1–4	Wilson (4–1)	Gausman (10–11)	Chapman (32)	42,927	90–67	+1
158	September 24	Red Sox	1–7	Crochet (18–5)	Scherzer (5–5)	—	39,438	90–68	—
159	September 25	Red Sox	6–1	Rodríguez (3–2)	Bello (11–9)	—	42,129	91–68	―
160	September 26	Rays	4–2	Bieber (4–2)	Houser (8–5)	Hoffman (33)	42,184	92–68	―
161	September 27	Rays	5–1	Yesavage (1–0)	Boyle (1–4)	—	42,624	93–68	―
162	September 28	Rays	13–4	Fluharty (5–2)	Seymour (4–3)	—	42,083	94–68	―

== Postseason ==
=== Postseason game log ===
Legend
Blue Jays win	Blue Jays loss	Game postponed

2025 Postseason Game Log
American League Division Series (vs. New York Yankees): 3–1

#	Date	Opponent	Score	Win	Loss	Save	Attendance	Series
1	October 4	Yankees	10–1	Gausman (1–0)	Gil (0–1)	―	44,655	1–0
2	October 5	Yankees	13–7	Yesavage (1–0)	Fried (0–1)	―	44,764	2–0
3	October 7	@ Yankees	6–9	Hill (1–0)	Varland (0–1)	Bednar (2)	47,399	2–1
4	October 8	@ Yankees	5–2	Domínguez (1–0)	Schlittler (1–1)	Hoffman (1)	47,823	3–1

American League Championship Series (vs. Seattle Mariners): 4–3

#	Date	Opponent	Score	Win	Loss	Save	Attendance	Series
1	October 12	Mariners	1–3	Miller (1–0)	Gausman (1–1)	Muñoz (2)	44,474	0–1
2	October 13	Mariners	3–10	Bazardo (1–0)	Yesavage (1–1)	―	44,814	0–2
3	October 15	@ Mariners	13–4	Bieber (1–0)	Kirby (0–1)	―	46,471	1–2
4	October 16	@ Mariners	8–2	Scherzer (1–0)	Castillo (1–1)	―	46,981	2–2
5	October 17	@ Mariners	2–6	Speier (1–1)	Little (0–1)	―	46,758	2–3
6	October 19	Mariners	6–2	Yesavage (2–1)	Gilbert (1–1)	―	44,764	3–3
7	October 20	Mariners	4–3	Gausman (2–1)	Bazardo (1–1)	Hoffman (2)	44,770	4–3

World Series (vs. Los Angeles Dodgers): 3–4

#	Date	Opponent	Score	Win	Loss	Save	Attendance	Series
1	October 24	Dodgers	11–4	Domínguez (2–0)	Snell (3–1)	—	44,353	1–0
2	October 25	Dodgers	1–5	Yamamoto (3–1)	Gausman (2–2)	—	44,607	1–1
3	October 27	@ Dodgers	5–6 (18)	Klein (1–0)	Little (0–2)	―	52,654	1–2
4	October 28	@ Dodgers	6–2	Bieber (2–0)	Ohtani (2–1)	―	52,552	2–2
5	October 29	@ Dodgers	6–1	Yesavage (3–1)	Snell (3–2)	―	52,175	3–2
6	October 31	Dodgers	1–3	Yamamoto (4–1)	Gausman (2–3)	Glasnow (1)	44,710	3–3
7	November 1	Dodgers	4–5 (11)	Yamamoto (5–1)	Bieber (2–1)	—	44,713	3–4

=== Postseason rosters ===
Playoff rosters
American League Division Series

- Pitchers: 23 Jeff Hoffman 29 Yariel Rodríguez 34 Kevin Gausman 39 Trey Yesavage 45 Tommy Nance 48 Seranthony Domínguez 54 Brendon Little 56 Eric Lauer 57 Shane Bieber 58 Justin Bruihl 63 Braydon Fisher 68 Mason Fluharty 77 Louis Varland
- Catchers: 30 Alejandro Kirk 55 Tyler Heineman
- Infielders: 0 Andrés Giménez 7 Isiah Kiner-Falefa 22 Ernie Clement 27 Vladimir Guerrero Jr. 47 Addison Barger
- Outfielders: 3 Myles Straw 4 George Springer 5 Daulton Varsho 25 Anthony Santander 36 Davis Schneider 38 Nathan Lukes

American League Championship Series

- Pitchers: 23 Jeff Hoffman 29 Yariel Rodríguez 31 Max Scherzer 34 Kevin Gausman 39 Trey Yesavage 40 Chris Bassitt 48 Seranthony Domínguez 54 Brendon Little 56 Eric Lauer 57 Shane Bieber 63 Braydon Fisher 68 Mason Fluharty 77 Louis Varland
- Catchers: 30 Alejandro Kirk 55 Tyler Heineman
- Infielders: 0 Andrés Giménez 7 Isiah Kiner-Falefa 22 Ernie Clement 27 Vladimir Guerrero Jr. 47 Addison Barger
- Outfielders: 3 Myles Straw 4 George Springer 5 Daulton Varsho 10 Joey Loperfido (Games 4-7) 25 Anthony Santander (Games 1-3) 36 Davis Schneider 38 Nathan Lukes

World Series

- Pitchers: 23 Jeff Hoffman 31 Max Scherzer 34 Kevin Gausman 39 Trey Yesavage 40 Chris Bassitt 48 Seranthony Domínguez 54 Brendon Little 56 Eric Lauer 57 Shane Bieber 63 Braydon Fisher 68 Mason Fluharty 77 Louis Varland
- Catchers: 30 Alejandro Kirk 55 Tyler Heineman
- Infielders: 0 Andrés Giménez 2 Ty France 7 Isiah Kiner-Falefa 11 Bo Bichette 22 Ernie Clement 27 Vladimir Guerrero Jr. 47 Addison Barger
- Outfielders: 3 Myles Straw 4 George Springer 5 Daulton Varsho 36 Davis Schneider 38 Nathan Lukes

== Roster ==
2025 Toronto Blue Jays
Roster
Pitchers: 67 Jacob Barnes; 40 Chris Bassitt; 17 José Berríos; 57 Shane Bieber; 35 Ryan Borucki; 58 Justin Bruihl; 43 Ryan Burr; 48 Seranthony Domínguez; 60 Lázaro Estrada; 63 Braydon Fisher; 68 Mason Fluharty; 44 Bowden Francis; 93 Yimi García; 34 Kevin Gausman; 57 Chad Green; 23 Jeff Hoffman; 56 Eric Lauer; 58 Casey Lawrence; 54 Brendon Little; 58 Richard Lovelady; 62 Easton Lucas; 45 Tommy Nance; 33 Robinson Piña; 29 Yariel Rodríguez; 52 Nick Sandlin; 31 Max Scherzer; 65 Paxton Schultz; 50 Erik Swanson; 9 Dillon Tate; 12 Spencer Turnbull; 48 José Ureña; 77 Louis Varland; 21 Josh Walker; 39 Trey Yesavage	Catchers: 55 Tyler Heineman; 30 Alejandro Kirk; 20 Ali Sánchez; Infielders: 47 Addison Barger; 11 Bo Bichette; 22 Ernie Clement; 2 Ty France; 0 Andrés Giménez; 27 Vladimir Guerrero Jr.; 49 Leo Jiménez; 7 Isiah Kiner-Falefa; 24 Buddy Kennedy; 16 Michael Stefanic; 7 Will Wagner	Outfielders: 8 Jonatan Clase; 10 Joey Loperfido; 38 Nathan Lukes; 39 Will Robertson; 18 Alan Roden; 25 Anthony Santander; 36 Davis Schneider; 4 George Springer; 3 Myles Straw; 5 Daulton Varsho	Manager: 14 John Schneider; Coaches: 61 Alex Andreopoulos (bullpen catcher); 53 Mark Budzinski (first base/outfield); 51 Carlos Febles (third base/infield); 88 Sam Greene (assistant pitching); 15 DeMarlo Hale (associate manager); 78 Luis Hurtado (bullpen catcher); 80 Lou Iannotti (assistant hitting); 82 Graham Johnson (bullpen); -- John Lannan (mental performance coach); 46 Don Mattingly (bench coach); 59 Hunter Mense (assistant hitting); 79 David Popkins (hitting); 41 Pete Walker (pitching)

== Statistics ==
= Indicates team leader

= Indicates league leader

=== Batting ===
(updated through September 29, 2025)

Player	G	AB	R	H	2B	3B	HR	RBI	SB	BB	AVG	Ref.
Addison Barger	135	460	61	112	32	1	21	74	4	36	.243	
Bo Bichette	139	582	78	181	44	1	18	94	4	40	.311	
Jonatan Clase	34	100	10	21	3	0	2	9	3	10	.210	
Ernie Clement	157	545	83	151	35	2	9	50	6	27	.277	
Ty France	37	94	9	26	6	0	1	8	0	3	.277	
Andrés Giménez	101	329	39	69	11	1	7	35	12	25	.210	
Vladimir Guerrero Jr.	156	589	96	172	34	0	23	84	6	81	.292	
Tyler Heineman	64	149	25	43	8	1	3	20	2	12	.289	
Leo Jiménez	18	29	2	2	0	0	1	1	0	2	.069	
Buddy Kennedy	2	5	1	1	1	0	0	0	0	1	.200	
Isiah Kiner-Falefa	19	30	5	7	1	0	1	5	0	0	.233	
Alejandro Kirk	130	451	45	127	18	0	15	76	1	48	.282	
Joey Loperfido	41	96	12	32	4	0	4	14	1	4	.333	
Nathan Lukes	135	388	55	99	19	2	12	65	2	38	.255	
Will Robertson	3	10	0	1	0	0	0	1	0	1	.100	
Alan Roden	43	98	12	20	5	1	1	8	0	8	.204	
Ali Sánchez	8	21	2	5	2	0	0	0	0	0	.238	
Anthony Santander	54	194	16	34	5	0	6	18	0	25	.175	
Davis Schneider	82	188	33	44	5	0	11	31	3	36	.234	
George Springer	140	498	106	154	27	1	32	84	18	69	.309	
Michael Stefanic	9	22	1	4	0	0	0	0	0	3	.182	
Myles Straw	137	267	51	70	14	1	4	32	12	19	.262	
Daulton Varsho	71	248	43	59	13	2	20	55	2	17	.238	
Will Wagner	40	114	13	27	7	0	0	7	1	15	.237	
Totals	162	5507	798	1461	294	13	191	771	77	520	.265	

=== Pitching ===
(updated through September 29, 2025)

Player	G	GS	W	L	SV	ERA	WHIP	IP	H	R	ER	BB	K	Ref.
Jacob Barnes	6	0	0	1	0	9.00	1.63	8	10	9	8	3	5	
Chris Bassitt	32	31	11	9	0	3.96	1.33	170 1/3	174	80	75	52	166	
José Berríos	31	30	9	5	0	4.17	1.30	166	160	86	77	56	138	
Shane Bieber	7	7	4	2	0	3.57	1.02	40 1/3	34	16	16	7	37	
Ryan Borucki	4	0	0	0	0	0.00	1.62	4 1/3	3	0	0	4	5	
Justin Bruihl	15	0	0	0	0	5.27	1.90	13 2/3	19	10	8	7	18	
Ryan Burr	2	0	1	0	0	0.00	1.00	2	1	0	0	1	3	
Seranthony Domínguez	24	0	2	1	0	3.00	1.14	13 2/3	21	12	11	12	25	
Lázaro Estrada	2	0	0	0	0	8.59	1.50	7 1/3	10	7	7	1	10	
Braydon Fisher	52	1	7	0	0	2.70	1.02	50	32	15	15	19	62	
Mason Fluharty	55	0	5	2	1	4.44	1.14	52 2/3	36	28	26	24	56	
Bowden Francis	14	14	2	8	0	6.05	1.53	64	71	46	43	27	54	
Yimi García	22	0	1	2	3	3.86	1.19	21	13	10	9	12	25	
Kevin Gausman	32	32	10	11	0	3.59	1.06	193	155	79	77	50	189	
Chad Green	45	0	3	2	1	5.56	1.47	43 2/3	51	28	27	13	35	
Tyler Heineman	3	0	0	0	0	32.40	4.50	3 1/3	15	12	12	0	0	
Jeff Hoffman	71	0	9	7	33	4.37	1.19	68	54	34	33	27	84	
Isiah Kiner-Falefa	1	0	0	0	0	0.00	0.00	2/3	0	0	0	0	0	
Eric Lauer	28	15	9	2	0	3.18	1.11	104 2/3	90	39	37	26	102	
Casey Lawrence	1	0	0	0	0	10.13	2.25	2 2/3	6	3	3	0	1	
Brendon Little	79	0	4	2	1	3.03	1.36	68 1/3	48	28	23	45	91	
Richard Lovelady	2	0	0	1	0	21.60	2.40	1 2/3	2	4	4	2	3	
Easton Lucas	6	5	3	3	0	6.66	1.52	24 1/3	25	18	18	12	23	
Tommy Nance	30	0	2	0	0	1.99	1.01	31 2/3	25	11	7	7	32	
Robinson Piña	1	0	0	0	0	6.75	3.75	1 1/3	4	3	1	1	1	
Yariel Rodríguez	66	1	3	2	2	3.08	1.15	73	50	26	25	34	66	
Ali Sánchez	1	0	0	0	0	18.00	3.00	1	3	2	2	0	1	
Nick Sandlin	19	0	0	2	1	2.20	1.16	16 1/3	11	7	4	8	16	
Max Scherzer	17	17	5	5	0	5.19	1.29	85	87	49	49	23	82	
Paxton Schultz	13	2	0	0	0	4.38	1.42	24 2/3	27	16	12	8	28	
Michael Stefanic	1	0	0	0	0	0.00	0.00	1	0	0	0	0	0	
Erik Swanson	6	0	1	0	0	15.19	2.44	5 1/3	8	9	9	5	3	
Dillon Tate	6	0	0	0	0	4.26	2.21	6 1/3	8	3	3	6	8	
Spencer Turnbull	3	1	1	1	0	7.11	2.53	6 1/3	12	5	5	4	4	
José Ureña	6	2	0	0	0	3.65	1.22	12 1/3	12	5	5	3	5	
Louis Varland	23	1	1	0	0	4.94	1.39	23 2/3	24	13	13	9	28	
Josh Walker	3	0	0	0	0	7.20	2.00	5	8	4	4	2	8	
Trey Yesavage	3	3	1	0	0	3.21	1.43	14	13	5	5	7	16	
Totals	162	162	94	68	42	4.19	1.27	1438.0	1313	721	669	517	1430	

== Transactions ==
=== March ===
- On March 27, designated Tommy Nance, Zach Pop, and Nick Robertson for assignment, placed Daulton Varsho on the 10-day injured list, placed Ryan Burr and Erik Swanson on the 15-day injured list, and selected the contracts of Jacob Barnes, Alan Roden, and Myles Straw.
- On March 29, outrighted Tommy Nance to Triple-A Buffalo.
- On March 30, placed Max Scherzer on the 15-day injured list, designated Richard Lovelady for assignment, recalled Easton Lucas, and selected the contract of Mason Fluharty.

=== April ===
- On April 1, traded Nick Robertson to the Houston Astros for Edinson Batista.
- On April 2, released Zach Pop.
- On April 3, outrighted Richard Lovelady to Triple-A Buffalo.
- On April 15, placed Nathan Lukes on the paternity list and recalled Addison Barger.
- On April 17, optioned Davis Schneider to the Triple-A Buffalo Bisons.
- On April 18, activated Nathan Lukes.

== Farm system ==
Level	Team	League	Manager	Win–loss record	Division	Postseason	Ref.
Triple-A	Buffalo Bisons	International League	Casey Candaele	30–43 (first half); 31–42 (second half)	East Division	Did not qualify	
Double-A	New Hampshire Fisher Cats	Eastern League	Brent Lavallee	29–40 (first half); 27–41 (second half)	Northeast Division	Did not qualify	
High-A	Vancouver Canadians	Northwest League	Jose Mayorga	37–29 (first half); 38–28 (second half)	Northwest League	Did not qualify	
Low-A	Dunedin Blue Jays	Florida State League	Gil Kim	34–31 (first half); 26–35 (second half)	West Division	Did not qualify	
Rookie	FCL Blue Jays	Florida Complex League	John Tamargo	36–23	North Division	Qualified won F 2–0	
Rookie	DSL Blue Jays Blue	Dominican Summer League	Danny Canellas	22–33	Southwest Division	Did not qualify	
Rookie	DSL Blue Jays Red	Dominican Summer League	Ashley Ponce	30–26	South Division	Did not qualify	
