= 2025 American League Championship Series =

Team (Wins)	Managers	Season
Toronto Blue Jays (4)	John Schneider	94–68 (.580), GA: 0
Seattle Mariners (3)	Dan Wilson	90–72 (.556), GA: 3
- Dates: October 12–20
- MVP: Vladimir Guerrero Jr. (Toronto)
- Umpires: Ryan Additon, Doug Eddings, Marvin Hudson, Alfonso Márquez (crew chief), Ben May, D. J. Reyburn, Quinn Wolcott

Broadcast
- Television: Canada: Sportsnet; Citytv (Game 1, 2 and 7); TVA Sports (French); United States: Fox (Game 1, 2 and 7); FS1 (Game 2–7); Fox Deportes (Spanish)
- TV announcers: Dan Shulman, Buck Martinez, and Hazel Mae (Sportsnet); Joe Davis, John Smoltz, Ken Rosenthal, and Tom Verducci (Fox/FS1)
- Radio: ESPN
- Radio announcers: Karl Ravech, Eduardo Pérez, and Tim Kurkjian
- ALDS: Toronto Blue Jays over New York Yankees (3–1); Seattle Mariners over Detroit Tigers (3–2)

The 2025 American League Championship Series (ALCS) was the best-of-seven playoff in Major League Baseball's 2025 postseason between the top-seeded Toronto Blue Jays and the second-seeded Seattle Mariners for the American League (AL) pennant and the right to play in the 2025 World Series. The series began on October 12 and ended with a 4–3 Blue Jays victory in a Game 7 win on October 20, highlighted by a seventh-inning go-ahead three-run home run by George Springer, the first go-ahead home run while trailing by multiple runs in the seventh inning or later in Game 7 history. Vladimir Guerrero Jr. won the ALCS MVP.

It marked the sixth time that two expansion teams have met in the ALCS, and was the second postseason meeting for the two teams since their matchup in the 2022 American League Wild Card Series. The Mariners were trying to reach the World Series for the first time in franchise history; they are the only major league team who have never played in that series. It was the first time the ALCS has featured two teams that have each played at least thirty years since reaching the World Series or never reaching it before in that timespan. (Note: The 2014 ALCS featured the Baltimore Orioles, pursuing their first pennant in 31 years, and the Kansas City Royals, seeking their first pennant in 29 years.)

Fox and FS1 (including their Fox One streaming service) televised the games in the United States. Sportsnet (including its Sportsnet+ streaming service) televised the games in Canada in English, while TVA Sports broadcast the series in French. Select games also aired in Canada on Sportsnet's sibling broadcast network Citytv.

The Blue Jays would go on to lose in the 2025 World Series to the Los Angeles Dodgers in seven games.

== Background ==
This was the first American League Championship Series (ALCS) since 2016 not to feature the Houston Astros, who failed to qualify for the playoffs, the Cleveland Guardians, who lost to the Detroit Tigers in the 2025 American League Wild Card Series (ALWCS) in three games, or the New York Yankees.

The Toronto Blue Jays qualified for the postseason on September 21 and won the American League East by defeating the Tampa Bay Rays on the last day of the season. They tied the Yankees in the standings at 94–68, but by virtue of their better 8–5 regular season head-to-head record against New York, they won the division to claim a first-round bye and the top seed in the league. It was the Blue Jays' first AL East title since 2015 and their fourth overall postseason appearance since 2020. In the ALDS, they defeated the Yankees in four games, with their Game 1 win ending a six-game postseason losing streak. This was the Blue Jays' eighth ALCS (first since 2016), going 2–5 in their previous seven appearances. Toronto was attempting to end its 32-year pennant drought and return to the World Series for the first time since their 1993 championship season, which was their second consecutive championship.

The Seattle Mariners qualified for the postseason on September 23 with a win over the Colorado Rockies. The next night, they defeated the Rockies again to clinch their first American League West division title since 2001, which ended the second-longest division title drought in the majors, and claimed a first-round bye as the second seed in the league. In the ALDS, the Mariners defeated the Tigers in five games, with Jorge Polanco hitting a bases-loaded walk-off single in the 15th inning of Game 5. This was the Mariners' fourth ALCS appearance, their previous three appearances having been in 1995, 2000, and 2001. The Mariners were looking to win the American League pennant and reach the World Series for the first time in franchise history in their 49th year of existence.

This series marked the second postseason meeting between the Blue Jays and Mariners, following the Mariners' sweep in the 2022 ALWCS at the Rogers Centre. In Game 2 of that series, the Mariners came back from an 8–1 deficit in the sixth inning and a 9–5 deficit in the eighth inning. The Blue Jays won the 2025 season series, 4–2, which included a road sweep of the Mariners at T-Mobile Park from May 9 to 11. This was the first ALCS to either feature a team that has never won a pennant (Mariners) or a team that has a 30-plus year pennant drought (Blue Jays) since the 1995 ALCS, which also featured the Mariners. Both franchises came into the league together in 1977 as part of expansion. This series also marked the sixth time that two expansion teams have met in the ALCS. (Note: The five previous: 1982, 1985, 2015, 2020, 2023)

== Summary ==
Toronto won the series, 4–3.

Game	Date	Score	Location	Time	Attendance
1	October 12	Seattle Mariners – 3, Toronto Blue Jays – 1	Rogers Centre	2:48	44,474
2	October 13	Seattle Mariners – 10, Toronto Blue Jays – 3	Rogers Centre	3:28	44,814
3	October 15	Toronto Blue Jays – 13, Seattle Mariners – 4	T-Mobile Park	2:49	46,471
4	October 16	Toronto Blue Jays – 8, Seattle Mariners – 2	T-Mobile Park	2:54	46,981
5	October 17	Toronto Blue Jays – 2, Seattle Mariners – 6	T-Mobile Park	3:00	46,758
6	October 19	Seattle Mariners – 2, Toronto Blue Jays – 6	Rogers Centre	2:51	44,764
7	October 20	Seattle Mariners – 3, Toronto Blue Jays – 4	Rogers Centre	2:50	44,770

== Game summaries ==
=== Game 1 ===
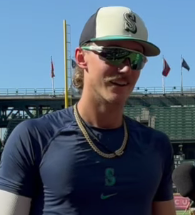
Bryce Miller pitched six innings and struck out three batters for Seattle in Game 1.

October 12, 2025 8:03 pm (EDT) at Rogers Centre in Toronto, Ontario 72 °F (22 °C), Roof Closed
Team	1	2	3	4	5	6	7	8	9	R	H	E
Seattle	0	0	0	0	0	2	0	1	0	3	7	1
Toronto	1	0	0	0	0	0	0	0	0	1	2	0
WP: Bryce Miller (1–0) LP: Kevin Gausman (0–1) Sv: Andrés Muñoz (1); Home runs: SEA: Cal Raleigh (1); TOR: George Springer (1); Attendance: 44,474; Boxscore

In the bottom of the first inning, George Springer hit a leadoff home run off Mariners starter Bryce Miller's first pitch to give the Blue Jays a 1–0 lead. Springer's home run was the only run the Blue Jays scored in this game and one of two Toronto hits. The Blue Jays led until the top of the sixth inning, when Cal Raleigh hit a solo home run off Blue Jays starter Kevin Gausman to tie the game at 1–1. Brendon Little then relieved Gausman and allowed a Jorge Polanco hit RBI single that scored Julio Rodríguez for the Mariners to take the lead at 2–1. Gausman pitched 5 2/3 innings, allowing three hits, two runs, and one walk while striking out five batters. Miller, pitching on short rest after starting Game 4 of the ALDS, pitched six innings, allowing two hits, one run, and three walks with three strikeouts. In the top of the eighth inning, Polanco hit another RBI single, scoring Randy Arozarena for an insurance run to extend the Mariners' lead to 3–1. Mariners closer Andrés Muñoz got the last out after Alejandro Kirk flew out to left field as the Mariners took a 1–0 lead in the series.

This was the first Mariners' LCS win since Game 3 of the 2001 ALCS against the New York Yankees.

=== Game 2 ===
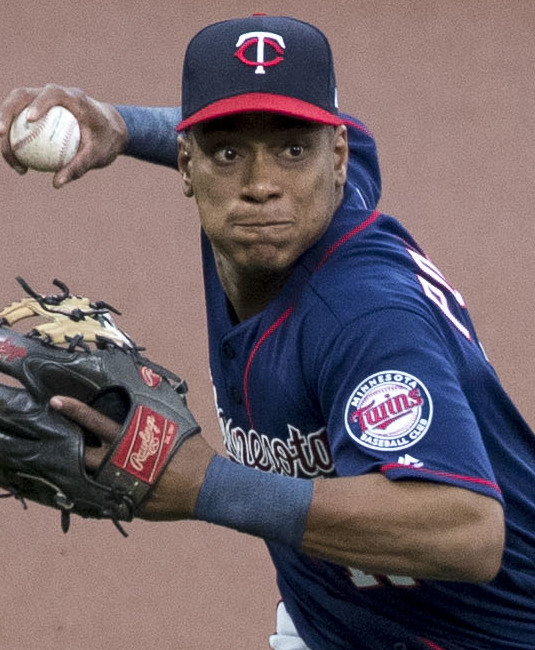
Jorge Polanco (pictured with the Minnesota Twins) got two hits, including a home run for Seattle in Game 2.

October 13, 2025 5:03 pm (EDT) at Rogers Centre in Toronto, Ontario 62 °F (17 °C), Partly Cloudy
Team	1	2	3	4	5	6	7	8	9	R	H	E
Seattle	3	0	0	0	3	1	3	0	0	10	10	1
Toronto	2	1	0	0	0	0	0	0	0	3	6	1
WP: Eduard Bazardo (1–0) LP: Trey Yesavage (0–1); Home runs: SEA: Julio Rodríguez (1), Jorge Polanco (1), Josh Naylor (1); TOR: None; Attendance: 44,814; Boxscore

The Toronto Maple Leafs of the National Hockey League moved the time of their October 13 home game against the Detroit Red Wings up two hours to accommodate Game 2 of the ALCS; fans could stay inside the Scotiabank Arena to watch the remainder of Game 2 live.

In the top of the first inning, after hitting Randy Arozarena with a pitch and walking Cal Raleigh, Blue Jays starter Trey Yesavage gave up a three-run home run to Julio Rodríguez to give the Mariners a 3−0 lead. In the bottom of the inning, George Springer scored when Nathan Lukes reached on a throwing error by Josh Naylor, cutting the Mariners' lead to 3−1. Later that inning, Lukes scored on an Alejandro Kirk single, reducing the Mariners' lead to 3−2. In the bottom of the second inning, Ernie Clement scored to tie the game 3−3, when Lukes hit an RBI single. Mariners starter Logan Gilbert pitched three innings, giving up three runs on five hits and one walk, while striking out two. Yesavage pitched four innings, giving up five runs on four hits and three walks, while striking out four. In the top of the fifth inning, Jorge Polanco hit a three-run home run off Louis Varland, giving the Mariners a 6−3 lead. In the top of the sixth inning, Mitch Garver hit a lead-off triple and was later pinch-run for by Leo Rivas, who scored on an RBI single by J. P. Crawford, extending the Mariners' lead to 7−3. In the top of the seventh inning, Polanco hit a single, then Naylor hit a two-run home run, pushing the Mariners' lead to 9−3. Still in the seventh inning, Eugenio Suárez scored on Crawford's sacrifice fly to give the Mariners a 10−3 lead. The Mariners took Game 2 and a 2–0 lead in the series.

=== Game 3 ===
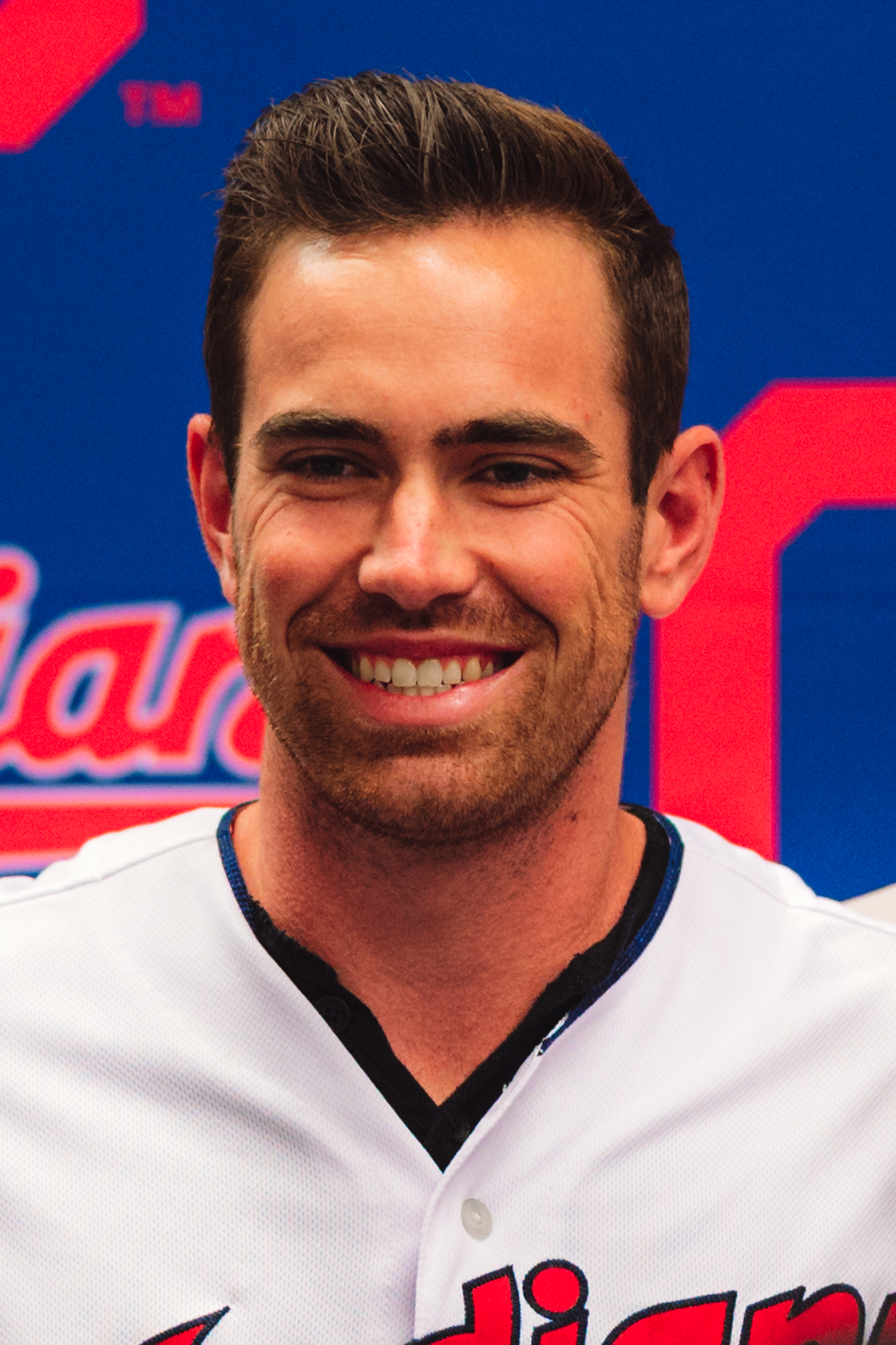
Shane Bieber (pictured with the Cleveland Indians) pitched six innings and struck out eight batters for Toronto in Game 3.

October 15, 2025 5:08 pm (PDT) at T-Mobile Park in Seattle, Washington 59 °F (15 °C), Clear
Team	1	2	3	4	5	6	7	8	9	R	H	E
Toronto	0	0	5	1	2	4	0	0	1	13	18	0
Seattle	2	0	0	0	0	0	0	2	0	4	8	1
WP: Shane Bieber (1–0) LP: George Kirby (0–1); Home runs: TOR: Andrés Giménez (1), George Springer (2), Vladimir Guerrero Jr. (1), Alejandro Kirk (1), Addison Barger (1); SEA: Julio Rodríguez (2), Randy Arozarena (1), Cal Raleigh (2); Attendance: 46,471; Boxscore

The game began with a familiar sense of déjà vu, mirroring the first two matchups. In the bottom of the first inning, Julio Rodríguez hit a two-run home run off Blue Jays starter Shane Bieber to give the Mariners an early lead. This time, however, the Blue Jays turned the tables. Andrés Giménez hit a two-run home run off Mariners starter George Kirby to tie the game at two in the third. Nathan Lukes scored a go-ahead run on a wild pitch from Kirby, and Daulton Varsho scored Vladimir Guerrero Jr. and Alejandro Kirk on a two-run RBI double, putting the Blue Jays up 5–2. In the top of the fourth inning, George Springer hit a solo home run, making it 6–2. Kirby pitched four innings, allowing eight hits, eight runs, and walking two batters while striking out four batters. The offensive surge continued in the fifth when Guerrero crushed a homer to center field, pushing the lead to 7–2. Ernie Clement then scored Anthony Santander, padding the margin to 8–2. In the sixth, Kirk blew the game wide open with a three-run homer off Mariners reliever Caleb Ferguson, stretching the Blue Jays' lead to 12–2. Bieber pitched six innings, allowing four hits, two runs, and walking only one batter while striking out eight batters. The Mariners found some late offense in the bottom of the eighth, where back-to-back home runs from Randy Arozarena and Cal Raleigh trimmed the deficit to 12–4. But in the top of the ninth, Addison Barger added one more with a solo shot, making it 13–4. The game ended when Victor Robles grounded out to Guerrero, sealing the Blue Jays' first win of the series.

=== Game 4 ===
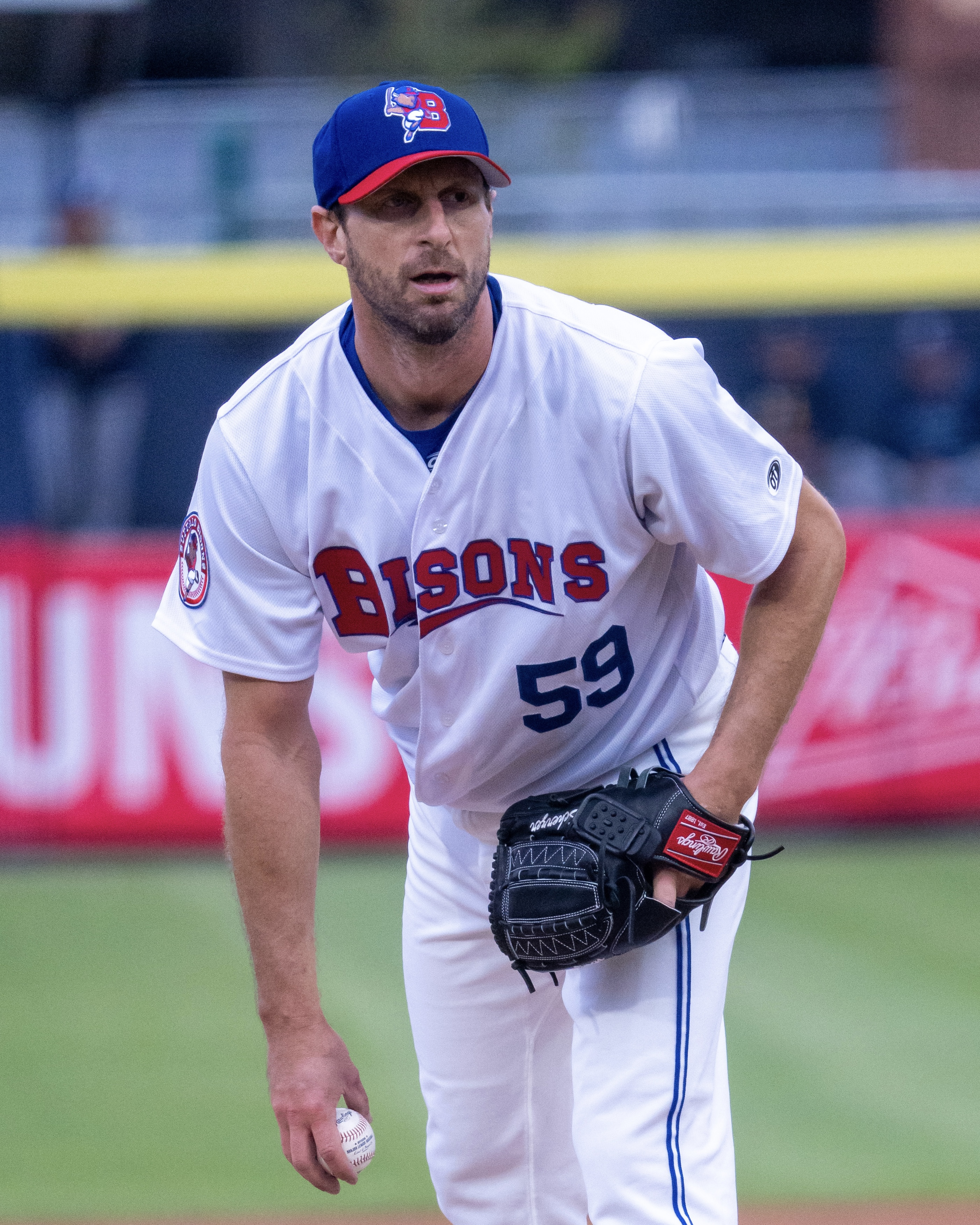
Max Scherzer (pictured with the Buffalo Bisons) pitched 5 2/3 innings and struck out five batters for Toronto in Game 4.

October 16, 2025 5:33 pm (PDT) at T-Mobile Park in Seattle, Washington 58 °F (14 °C), Cloudy
Team	1	2	3	4	5	6	7	8	9	R	H	E
Toronto	0	0	3	2	0	0	1	2	0	8	11	0
Seattle	0	1	0	0	0	1	0	0	0	2	5	0
WP: Max Scherzer (1–0) LP: Luis Castillo (0–1); Home runs: TOR: Andrés Giménez (2), Vladimir Guerrero Jr. (2); SEA: Josh Naylor (2); Attendance: 46,981; Boxscore

In the bottom of the second inning, Josh Naylor hit a solo home run off Blue Jays starter Max Scherzer to get the Mariners in front at 1–0. In the top of the third inning, Andrés Giménez hit a two-run home run off Mariners starter Luis Castillo to flip the lead in the Blue Jays' favor, 2–1. Castillo pitched 2 1/3 innings, allowing five hits, two runs, and walking one batter while striking out one. The Blue Jays extended their lead to 3–1 when Mariners reliever Gabe Speier walked Daulton Varsho, scoring Nathan Lukes. In the top of the fourth inning, George Springer scored Isiah Kiner-Falefa on an RBI double, and Springer scored on a wild pitch from reliever Matt Brash as the Blue Jays extended their lead to 5–1. Scherzer pitched 5 2/3 innings, allowing three hits, one run, and walking four while striking out five. In the bottom of the sixth inning, Jorge Polanco scored on an RBI single by Eugenio Suárez, cutting the Blue Jays' lead to 5–2. In the top of the seventh inning, Vladimir Guerrero Jr. hit a solo home run to center field, extending the Blue Jays' lead to 6–2. In the top of the eighth inning, Giménez scored Ernie Clement and Myles Straw on a two-run RBI single, further extending the lead to 8–2. The Blue Jays got the final out of the game when reliever Seranthony Domínguez struck out Dominic Canzone and evened the series at two apiece, making it a best-of-three going forward in the ALCS.

Scherzer was the fourth starting pitcher with a postseason win at age 41 or older, joining: Roger Clemens (5 wins), Kenny Rogers (3), and Dennis Martínez (1).

=== Game 5 ===
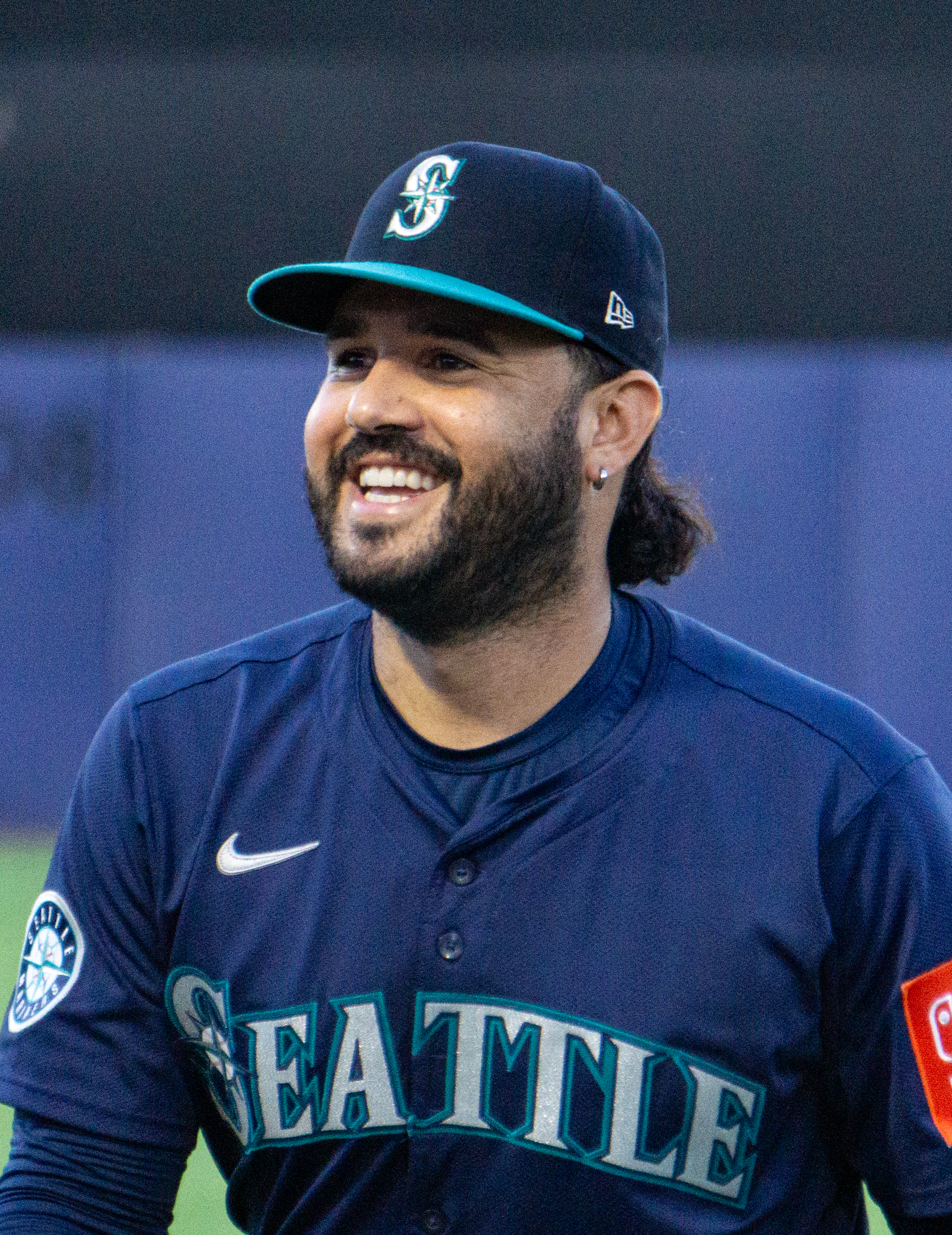
Eugenio Suárez hit two home runs, including a grand slam, in Game 5.

October 17, 2025 3:10 pm (PDT) at T-Mobile Park in Seattle, Washington 60 °F (16 °C), Roof Closed
Team	1	2	3	4	5	6	7	8	9	R	H	E
Toronto	0	0	0	0	1	1	0	0	0	2	7	0
Seattle	0	1	0	0	0	0	0	5	X	6	5	0
WP: Gabe Speier (1–0) LP: Brendon Little (0–1); Home runs: TOR: None; SEA: Eugenio Suárez 2 (2), Cal Raleigh (3); Attendance: 46,758; Boxscore

Game 5 featured a rematch of Game 1 between starting pitchers Kevin Gausman and Bryce Miller. In the bottom of the second inning, Eugenio Suárez hit a solo home run off Gausman, giving the Mariners a 1−0 lead. In the top of the fourth inning, Miller escaped a bases-loaded jam after Ernie Clement grounded into a double play. Miller pitched four scoreless innings, allowing four hits and two walks while striking out four. In the top of the fifth inning, a leadoff single from Addison Barger prompted Miller's removal, and the Blue Jays would then break through against Seattle's relievers, with George Springer tying the game with an RBI single, scoring Barger from second. The top of the sixth inning would then see the Blue Jays take the lead when Clement delivered a single that drove in Alejandro Kirk, putting the Blue Jays ahead 2–1. Gausman pitched 5 2/3 innings, allowing three hits and one run while issuing three walks and recording four strikeouts.

The seventh would go quietly, although Dominic Canzone would come within inches of tying the game with a flyball just left of the foul pole. Following a 1-2-3 top of the eighth, Cal Raleigh tied the game with a home run to left off Blue Jays reliever Brendon Little. The Mariners then broke it open against Little with back-to-back walks, followed by Randy Arozarena getting hit by a pitch from Seranthony Domínguez, who came on in relief. Suárez then launched a grand slam to right field to give the Mariners a commanding 6–2 lead. For Suárez, it was the fourth grand slam he had hit this season. Closer Andrés Muñoz got the final out after Joey Loperfido ground out to shortstop J. P. Crawford as the Mariners took Game 5. This marked the first time in this series that the home team won a game, as the road team had won the four previous games.

This win marked the first time in franchise history the Mariners won three games in an ALCS, previously only winning two against the Cleveland Indians in 1995 and the New York Yankees in 2000. This was also the first home win for the Mariners in an ALCS since 2000.

=== Game 6 ===
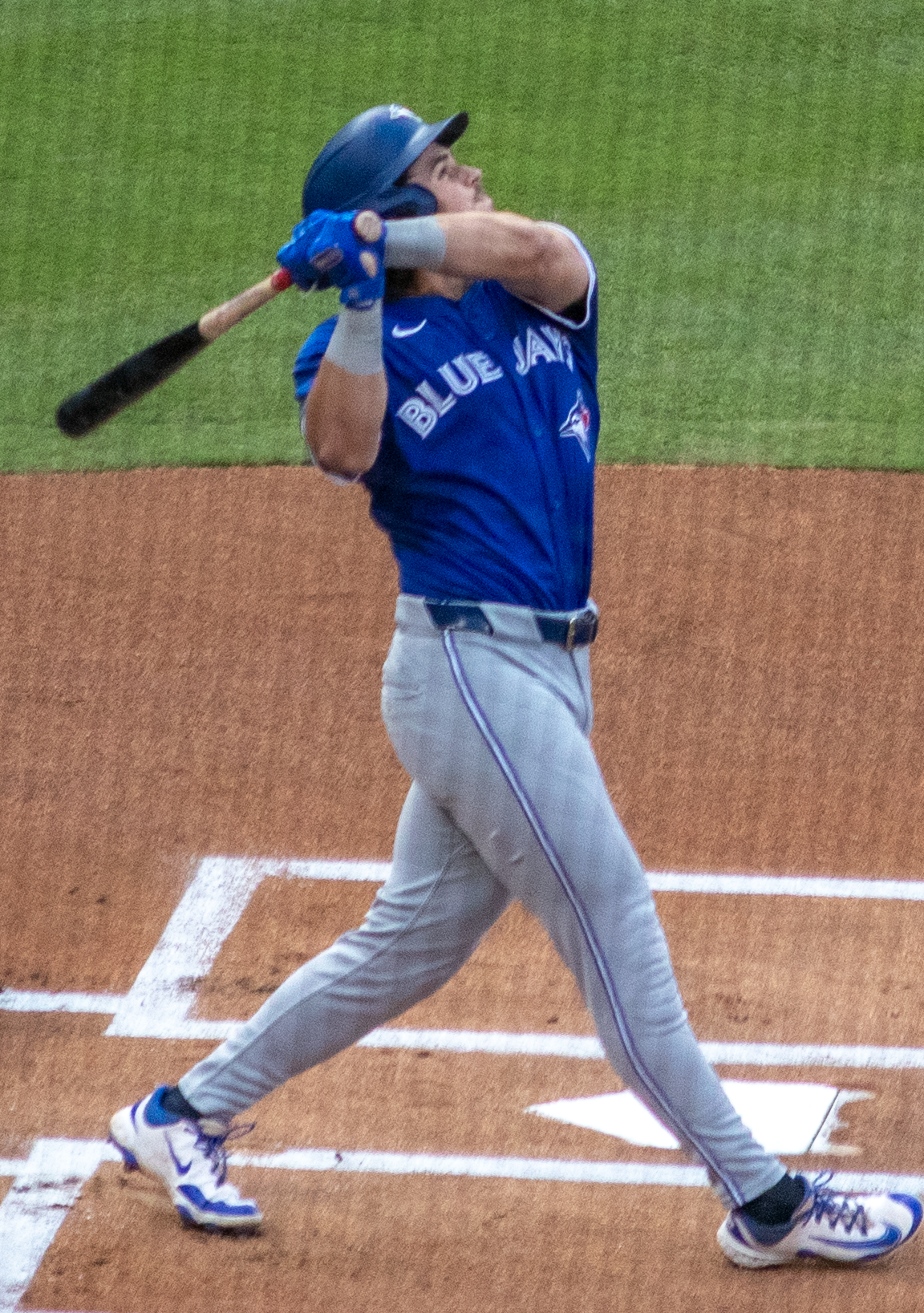
Addison Barger hit a two-run home run in Game 6.

October 19, 2025 8:03 pm (EDT) at Rogers Centre in Toronto, Ontario 68 °F (20 °C), Roof Closed
Team	1	2	3	4	5	6	7	8	9	R	H	E
Seattle	0	0	0	0	0	2	0	0	0	2	7	3
Toronto	0	2	2	0	1	0	1	0	X	6	11	0
WP: Trey Yesavage (1–1) LP: Logan Gilbert (0–1); Home runs: SEA: Josh Naylor (3); TOR: Addison Barger (2), Vladimir Guerrero Jr. (3); Attendance: 44,764; Boxscore

Game 6 featured a rematch of Game 2 starters Trey Yesavage and Logan Gilbert in what was the first game the Mariners ever played where a win would seal the pennant.

The Blue Jays' right-handed youngster answered the call early, retiring the first six with four strikeouts in the first two innings. The Blue Jays would quickly capitalize in the bottom of the second, with Daulton Varsho and Ernie Clement both reaching base before back-to-back hits from Addison Barger and Isiah Kiner-Falefa drove them in to take a 2–0 lead for the Blue Jays. In the top of the third inning, Yesavage escaped a one-out bases-loaded jam with Cal Raleigh grounding into a double play. Barger then hit a two-run home run off Gilbert in the bottom of the third to extend the lead to 4–0. In the top of the fourth inning, Yesavage again loaded the bases with one out and again escaped the jam with J. P. Crawford grounding into a double play. In the bottom of the fifth inning, Vladimir Guerrero Jr. continued his postseason tear when he homered to left field to extend the lead to five, chasing Gilbert from the game. Gilbert pitched four innings, allowing seven hits, four runs, and walking one batter while striking out three.

In the top of the sixth inning, Josh Naylor hit a solo home run off Yesavage to put the Mariners on the board 5–1. Yesavage was then replaced after another single to Randy Arozarena, having pitched 5 2/3 innings, allowing six hits, one run, and walking three batters while striking out seven. Eugenio Suárez then scored Arozarena to cut the Blue Jays' lead to 5–2. But the Mariners were hitless for the rest of the night, and in the bottom of the seventh inning, a wild pitch from Mariners reliever Matt Brash and a throwing error by Raleigh brought in Guerrero from second base, putting the Blue Jays back to a four run lead. The Blue Jays got the final out of the game when Dominic Canzone popped out to Clement, evening the series at 3–3 apiece and forcing a winner-takes-all Game 7.

=== Game 7 ===
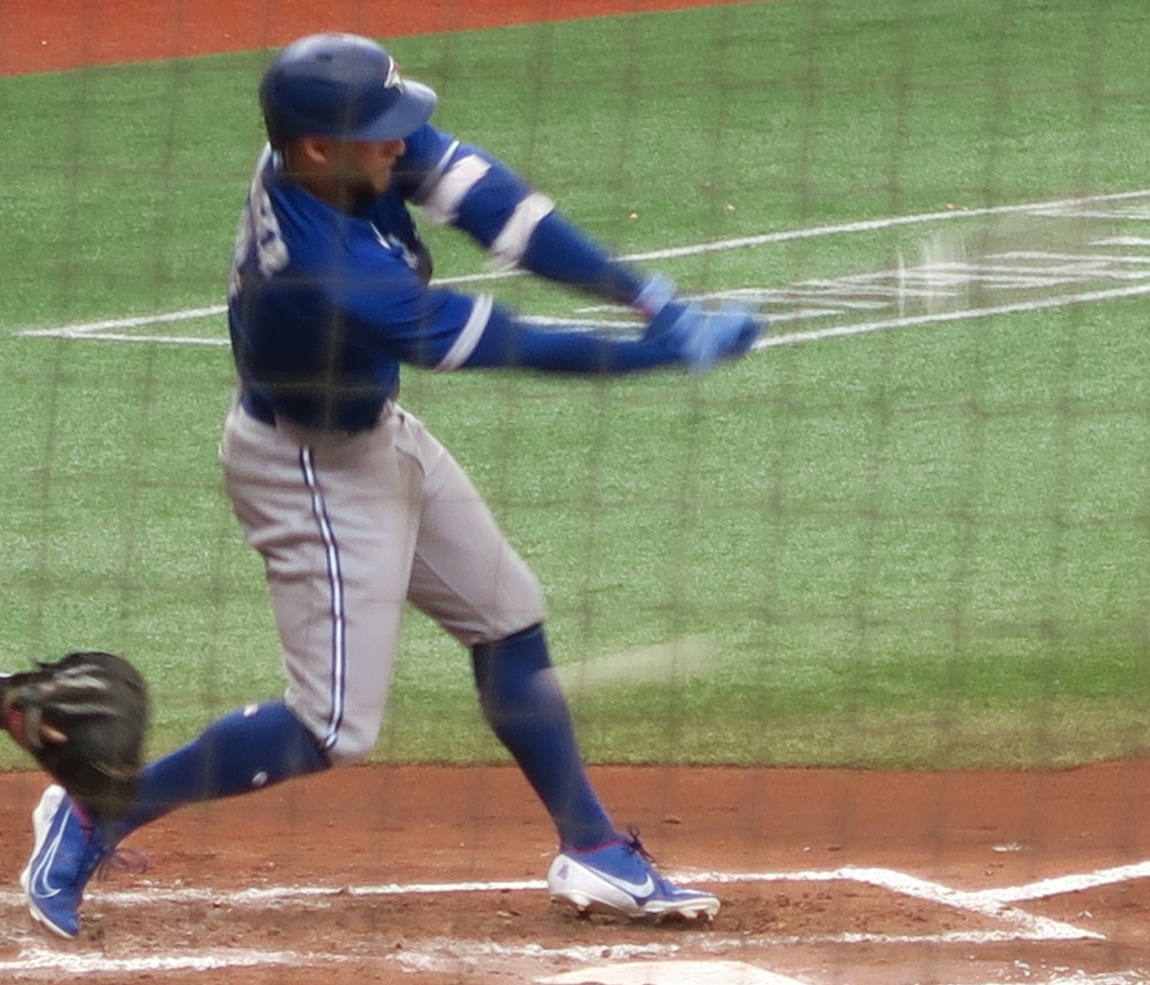
George Springer hit a go-ahead three-run home run in the seventh inning in Game 7, his ninth career postseason go-ahead home run.

October 20, 2025 8:10 pm (EDT) at Rogers Centre in Toronto, Ontario 68 °F (20 °C), Roof Closed
Team	1	2	3	4	5	6	7	8	9	R	H	E
Seattle	1	0	1	0	1	0	0	0	0	3	8	0
Toronto	1	0	0	0	0	0	3	0	X	4	10	0
WP: Kevin Gausman (1–1) LP: Eduard Bazardo (1–1) Sv: Jeff Hoffman (1); Home runs: SEA: Julio Rodríguez (3), Cal Raleigh (4); TOR: George Springer (3); Attendance: 44,770; Boxscore

External videos
- Game 7 full replay on the MLB's official YouTube channel

This was the first Game 7 played by the Mariners in franchise history, and it was only the second played by the Blue Jays, who last did so in the ALCS in 1985. This was the first Game 7 of an LCS since 2023, when both series went to a decisive Game 7. The game featured a rematch of Game 3 starters Shane Bieber and George Kirby.

In the top of the first inning, Josh Naylor hit an RBI single, scoring Julio Rodríguez to give Seattle a 1−0 lead. The Blue Jays responded in the bottom half, as Daulton Varsho tied the game with a 2-out single that drove in George Springer. Bieber would work out of a 2-hit second, but in the third, Rodríguez tagged him for a solo home run to give Seattle a 2–1 lead. Bieber pitched 3 2/3 innings, allowing seven hits, two runs, and walking one batter while striking out five. His counterpart Kirby allowed four hits, one run, and one walk over four complete innings while striking out three. In the fifth inning, Cal Raleigh drove a changeup from Blue Jays reliever Louis Varland into the right field bullpen, extending Seattle's lead to 3-1. In the bottom half, Kirby gave way to Bryan Woo, who struck out Springer on three pitches and induced a double play from Nathan Lukes.

In the bottom of the seventh, with the Mariners nine outs from their first World Series appearance, the bottom of Toronto's order rallied against Woo. Addison Barger drew a leadoff walk and Isiah Kiner-Falefa followed with a single into center field. 9th hitter Andrés Giménez laid down a sacrifice bunt to advance the tying run into scoring position. Woo was relieved by Eduard Bazardo, who was tasked with facing leadoff man George Springer. On the second pitch, Springer hit a dramatic three-run home run into the left field bleachers, sending Rogers Centre into a frenzy and giving the Blue Jays a 4–3 lead. It was the first go-ahead homer while trailing by multiple runs in the seventh inning or later in a Game 7 in MLB history.

After the Mariners escaped a jam to keep it a one-run game going into the ninth, the Blue Jays called on closer Jeff Hoffman for his second save opportunity of the postseason. Hoffman proceeded to fan both Leo Rivas and pinch-hitter Dominic Canzone, setting up a showdown with the dangerous Rodríguez. After falling behind 2-0, Hoffman got Rodríguez to chase back-to-back sliders off the plate, evening the count at 2-2. With the count full, Hoffman struck out Rodríguez with another slider off the plate and sent the Jays to the World Series for the first time in 32 years.

This series was the closest the Mariners have come to winning a pennant, as they previously lost to the Cleveland Indians and New York Yankees in six games in 1995 and 2000 respectively. With this loss, Seattle remains the only franchise in Major League Baseball never to appear in a World Series, as their ALCS record fell to 0–4.

With the win, the Blue Jays won their first Game 7 in franchise history, and became the first team to win a League Championship Series after losing the first two games at home (Note: The Dodgers won the 2020 NLCS after losing the first two games as the home team, but that was played at a neutral site due to the COVID-19 pandemic.) However, this situation happened in three past World Series: The Kansas City Royals, New York Mets, and New York Yankees accomplished the feat in 1985, 1986, and 1996, respectively.

Along with the Edmonton Oilers winning the NHL Western Conference title, 2025 marked the first year since 1993 in which multiple Canadian teams were playing for a championship in the four major leagues, as the Blue Jays and the Montreal Canadiens previously won both the World Series and Stanley Cup respectively that year.

For hitting .385 with three home runs in the series, Vladimir Guerrero Jr. won the ALCS MVP.

=== Composite line score ===
2025 ALCS (4–3): Toronto Blue Jays defeated Seattle Mariners

Team	1	2	3	4	5	6	7	8	9	R	H	E
Seattle Mariners	6	2	1	0	4	6	3	8	0	30	50	6
Toronto Blue Jays	4	3	10	3	4	5	5	2	1	37	65	1
Total attendance: 319,302 Average attendance: 45,614

== See also ==
- 2025 National League Championship Series
- Blue Jays–Mariners rivalry
