= Ali Sánchez =

Venezuelan baseball player (born 1997)

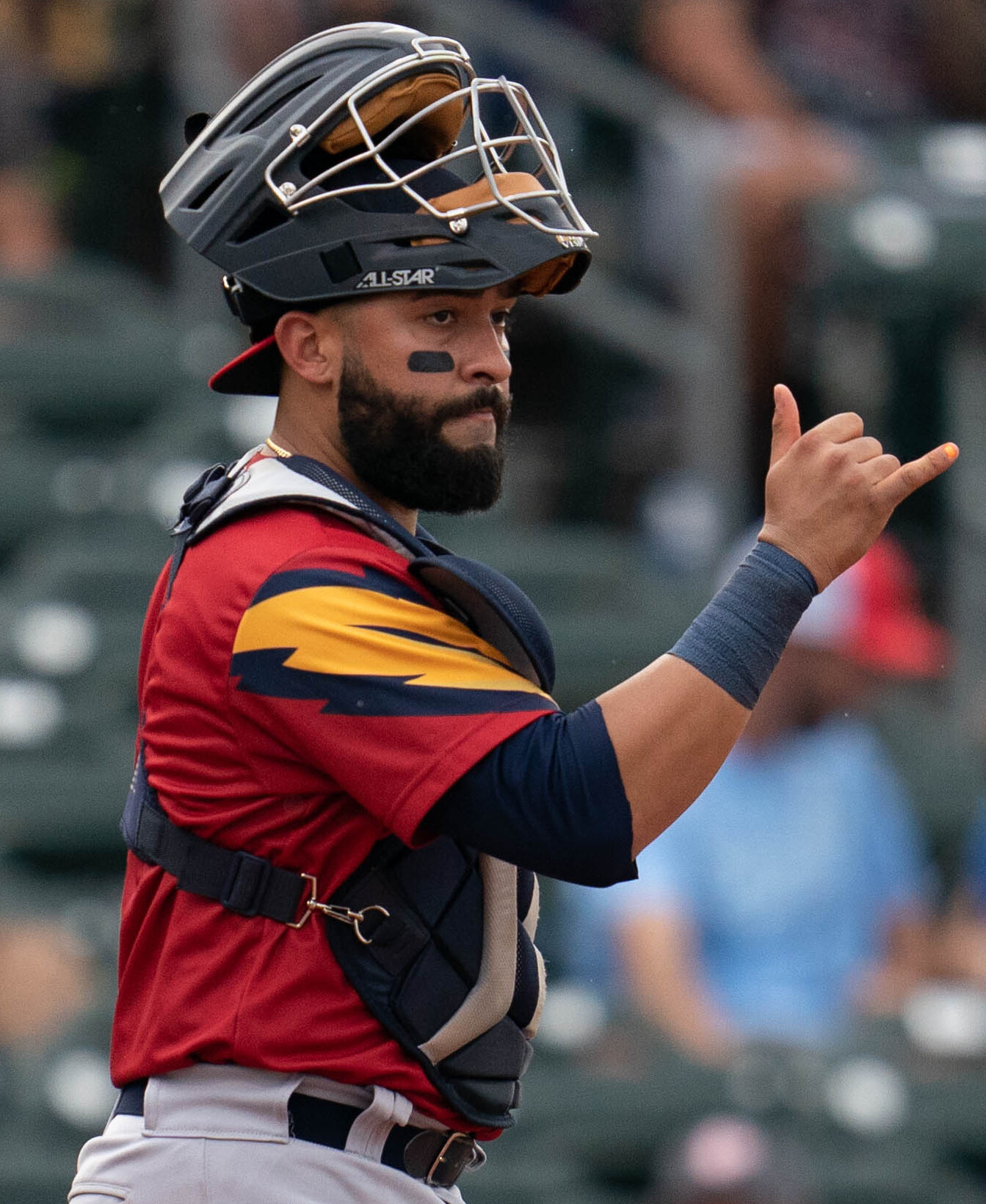
- Sánchez with the Toledo Mud Hens in 2022

New York Yankees – No. 39
- Catcher
- Born: January 20, 1997 (age 29); Carora, Venezuela
- Bats: Right Throws: Right

MLB debut
- August 10, 2020, for the New York Mets

MLB statistics (through 2026 season)
- Batting average: .209
- Home runs: 1
- Runs batted in: 12
- Stats at Baseball Reference

Teams
- New York Mets (2020); St. Louis Cardinals (2021); Miami Marlins (2024); Toronto Blue Jays (2025); Boston Red Sox (2025); New York Yankees (2026–present)

Ali Miguel Sánchez (born January 20, 1997) is a Venezuelan professional baseball catcher for the New York Yankees of Major League Baseball (MLB). He has previously played in MLB for the New York Mets, St. Louis Cardinals, Miami Marlins, Toronto Blue Jays, and Boston Red Sox.

== Career ==
=== New York Mets ===
On July 2, 2013, Sánchez signed with the New York Mets as an international free agent.

In 2014, Sánchez spent the season with the Dominican Summer League Mets, hitting .303/.406/.394 with three home runs and 24 runs batted in (RBI). In 2015, Sánchez split the season between the rookie-level Gulf Coast League Mets and Kingsport Mets, hitting .272/.330/.306 with 20 RBI. Sánchez spent 2016 with the Brooklyn Cyclones, hitting .216/.260/.275 with 11 RBI. In 2017, Sánchez played for the Columbia Fireflies, hitting .231/.288/.264 with one home run and 15 RBI.

In 2018, Sánchez split the season between Columbia and the St. Lucie Mets, combining to hit .265/.294/.387 with six home runs and 38 RBI. Following the 2018 season, Sánchez played for the Scottsdale Scorpions of the Arizona Fall League. In 2019, Sánchez split the season between the Double-A Binghamton Rumble Ponies and Triple-A Syracuse Mets, hitting a combined .261/.326/.322 with one home run and three RBI. Following the 2019 season, Sánchez was added to the Mets' 40-man roster in order to be protected from the Rule 5 draft.

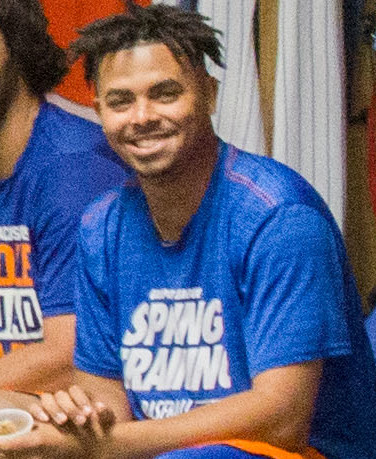
Sánchez with the Syracuse Mets in 2019

On August 10, 2020, Sánchez made his MLB debut for the Mets. He played in five games for the Mets during his rookie campaign, going 1-for-9. On February 10, 2021, Sánchez was designated for assignment by the Mets after the team traded for minor league outfielder Khalil Lee.

=== St. Louis Cardinals ===
On February 12, 2021, the Mets traded Sánchez to the St. Louis Cardinals for cash. Sánchez was recalled from the Cardinals' alternate training site on April 27. Sánchez had four at-bats with St. Louis in 2021, going 2-for-4.

Sánchez began the 2022 season with the Triple-A Memphis Redbirds. On June 15, Sánchez was designated for assignment by the Cardinals.

=== Detroit Tigers ===
On June 18, 2022, the Detroit Tigers claimed Sánchez off of waivers from St. Louis and optioned him to the Triple-A Toledo Mud Hens. In 44 games for Toledo, he batted .268/.369/.373 with 2 home runs and 21 RBI. On October 14, Sánchez was designated for assignment following the waiver claim of Michael Papierski.

=== Arizona Diamondbacks ===
On October 18, 2022, Sánchez was claimed off waivers by the Pittsburgh Pirates.

On December 2, 2022, Sánchez was claimed off waivers by the Arizona Diamondbacks. He was designated for assignment on December 23. On January 5, 2023, Sánchez was sent outright to the Triple-A Reno Aces. In 67 games for the Triple-A Reno Aces, he batted .311/.375/.492 with career-highs in home runs (11) and RBI (43). Sánchez elected free agency following the season on November 6.

=== Chicago Cubs ===
On December 1, 2023, Sánchez signed a one-year, major league contract with the Pittsburgh Pirates. On March 28, 2024, he was designated for assignment following multiple roster moves. Sánchez cleared waivers and was sent outright to the Triple-A Indianapolis Indians on March 31. However, he rejected the assignment and subsequently elected free agency.

On April 5, 2024, Sánchez signed a minor league contract with the Chicago Cubs. In 41 games for the Triple-A Iowa Cubs, Sánchez hit .240/.338/.388 with three home runs and 21 RBI.

=== Miami Marlins ===
On June 19, 2024, Sánchez was traded to the Miami Marlins for cash. Two days later, the Marlins added him to the major league roster. In 31 games for Miami, he hit .167/.211/.190 with four RBI and two stolen bases. Sánchez was designated for assignment by the Marlins on September 3. He cleared waivers and was sent outright to the Triple-A Jacksonville Jumbo Shrimp on September 5. Sánchez elected free agency on October 1.

=== Toronto Blue Jays ===
On December 16, 2024, Sánchez signed a minor league contract with the Toronto Blue Jays. In 28 appearances for the Triple-A Buffalo Bisons, he batted .253/.324/.440 with five home runs and 15 RBI. On May 25, 2025, the Blue Jays selected Sánchez's contract, adding him to their active roster. In five appearances for Toronto, he went 2-for-11 (.182). Sánchez was designated for assignment by the Blue Jays on June 3. He cleared waivers and was sent outright to Triple-A Buffalo the following day. Sánchez elected free agency on June 5 but re-signed with Toronto on a minor league contract the following day. On July 27, the Blue Jays selected Sánchez's contract, adding him back to their active roster. On July 29, Sánchez came in to pitch in relief during a blowout loss against the Baltimore Orioles; in the outing, he recorded his first career strikeout against Alex Jackson. In three appearances for Toronto, he went 3-for-10. Sánchez was designated for assignment by the Blue Jays on August 5.

=== Boston Red Sox ===
On August 8, 2025, Sánchez was claimed off waivers by the Boston Red Sox. He was added to the major league roster on August 11 and made his debut with the team two days later against the Houston Astros. Sánchez was designated for assignment five days later, having lined-out in his lone Red Sox at-bat. He cleared waivers and elected free agency on August 21.

=== New York Mets (second stint) ===
On August 22, 2025, Sánchez signed a minor league contract with the New York Mets. In three games for the Triple-A Syracuse Mets, Sánchez went 2-for-11 (.182) with four RBI.

=== Boston Red Sox (second stint) ===
On August 31, 2025, Sánchez was traded back to the Boston Red Sox for cash considerations; he was added to Boston's active roster the following day. In four appearances for Boston, he went 0-for-2 with one strikeout. On September 21, Sánchez was designated for assignment by the Red Sox. He cleared waivers and was sent outright to the Triple-A Worcester Red Sox on September 23. Sánchez elected free agency on October 6.

=== New York Yankees ===
On December 17, 2025, Sánchez signed a minor league contract with the New York Yankees. He began the 2026 season with the Triple-A Scranton/Wilkes-Barre RailRiders, slashing .227/.327/.375 with six home runs and 11 RBI. The Yankees promoted Sánchez to the major leagues on June 6. On July 28, Sánchez hit his first MLB home run off of Sean Newcomb of the Chicago White Sox.
