= Jeff Hoffman =

American baseball player (born 1993)

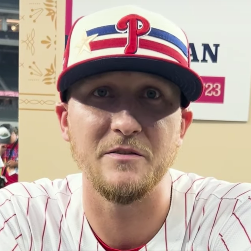
- Hoffman with the Philadelphia Phillies in 2024

Minnesota Twins – No. 24
- Pitcher
- Born: January 8, 1993 (age 33); Latham, New York, U.S.
- Bats: Right Throws: Right

MLB debut
- August 20, 2016, for the Colorado Rockies

MLB statistics (through 2026 season)
- Win–loss record: 38–41
- Earned run average: 4.63
- Strikeouts: 665
- Saves: 51
- Stats at Baseball Reference

Teams
- Colorado Rockies (2016–2020); Cincinnati Reds (2021–2022); Philadelphia Phillies (2023–2024); Toronto Blue Jays (2025–2026); Minnesota Twins (2026–present)

Career highlights and awards
- All-Star (2024)
Medals
Men's baseball
Representing United States
World Baseball Classic
Silver medal – second place	2026 Miami	Team

Jeffrey Robert Hoffman (born January 8, 1993) is an American professional baseball pitcher for the Minnesota Twins of Major League Baseball (MLB). He has previously played in MLB for the Colorado Rockies, Cincinnati Reds, Philadelphia Phillies, and Toronto Blue Jays. Hoffman played college baseball for the East Carolina Pirates, and was selected by the Blue Jays in the first round of the 2014 MLB draft. He made his MLB debut in 2016 with the Rockies.

== Amateur career ==
Hoffman attended Shaker High School in Latham, New York, and played for their baseball team as a pitcher. In his junior year, he pitched to a 7–0 win–loss record. In Hoffman's senior year, he led Shaker High School to their first Section II Class AA title game since 2002 against rival Colonie High School. Hoffman pitched seven shutout innings, 101 pitches and struck out nine. He struggled to be noticed by college baseball programs in the National Collegiate Athletic Association's Division I, as his fastball averaged 82–83 miles per hour (132–134 km/h). Hoffman pitched in Connie Mack Baseball during the offseason to attract attention from college programs, where his fastball improved to 92 miles per hour (148 km/h). This led to his signing a letter of intent with East Carolina University (ECU), a Division I school in Conference USA.

During his freshman year with the East Carolina Pirates baseball team in 2012, Hoffman started 10 of the 19 games in which he appeared, posting a 3–2 record, one save, a 3.67 earned run average (ERA), and struck out 55 batters in 72 2/3 innings pitched. East Carolina reached the National Collegiate Athletic Association Division I baseball tournament.

During the 2013 season Hoffman posted a 6–7 record, a 3.20 ERA, led the Pirates with 109 2/3 innings pitched and 84 strikeouts, was named to the All-Conference USA second team, and was added to the Golden Spikes Award watch list. In his junior year at ECU, Hoffman went 3–3 with a 2.94 ERA before suffering a torn ulnar collateral ligament in his right elbow injury that required Tommy John surgery.

In 2012 and 2013, Hoffman played collegiate summer baseball for the Hyannis Harbor Hawks of the Cape Cod Baseball League (CCBL). He was named a league all-star in 2012, and received the league's Outstanding Pro Prospect award in 2013.

== Professional career ==
=== Toronto Blue Jays ===
Hoffman was considered to be one of the best prospects available in the 2014 Major League Baseball draft, with the potential to be selected first overall, before his injury lowered his draft stock. The Toronto Blue Jays selected Hoffman in the first round, with the ninth overall selection, and he signed with Toronto on July 2 for the full bonus slot value of $3.1 million. Though unable to pitch, Hoffman was assigned to the Rookie Gulf Coast League Blue Jays for the 2014 season. He began throwing off a mound in February 2015, and made his professional debut with the Dunedin Blue Jays of the High-A Florida State League on May 20. Hoffman's fastball reached 99 miles per hour (159 km/h) during his first start. After making 11 starts with Dunedin, the Blue Jays promoted Hoffman to the New Hampshire Fisher Cats of the Double-A Eastern League. He made his first start for New Hampshire on July 18, pitching a career-high 6 1/3 innings and allowing two earned runs.

=== Colorado Rockies ===
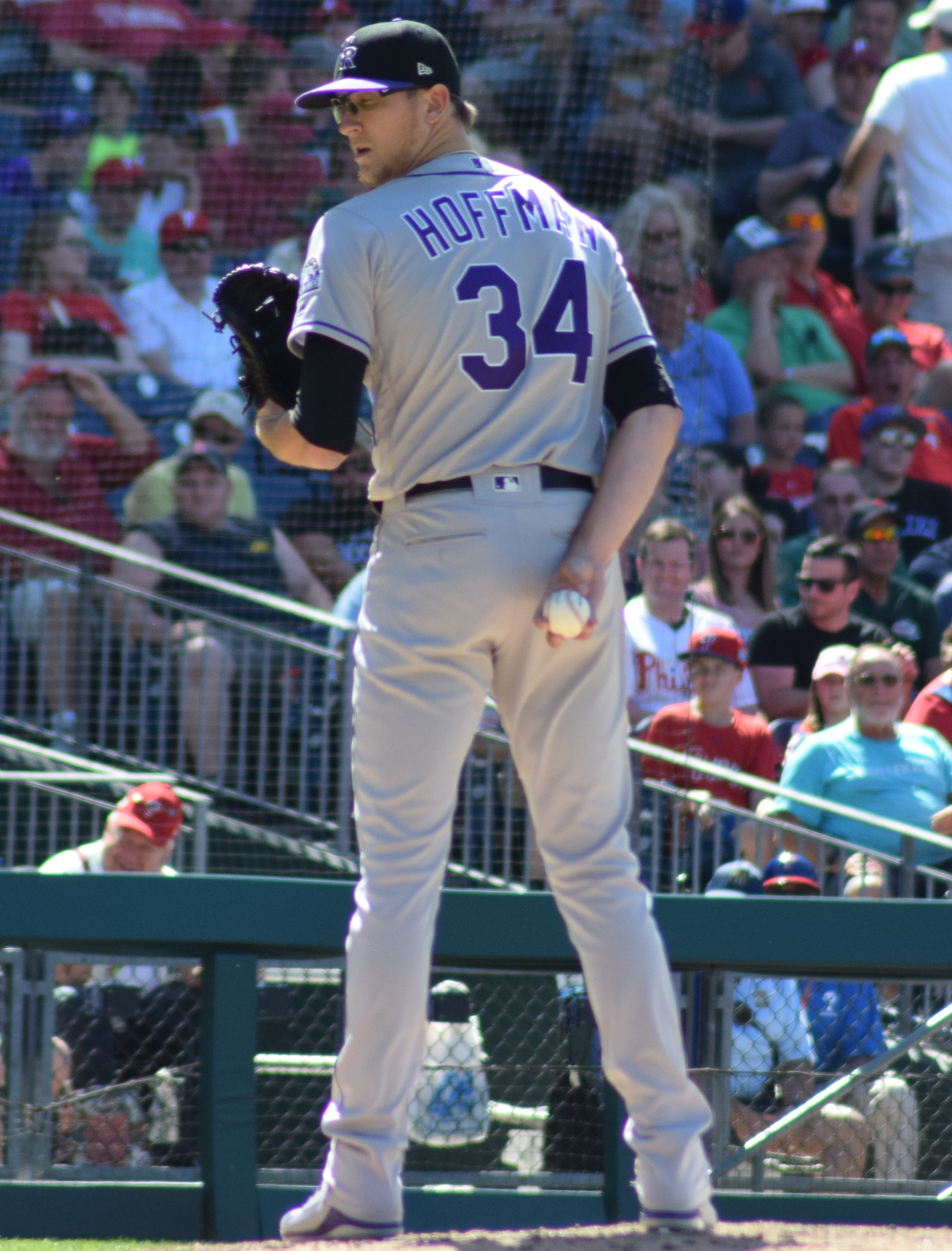
Hoffman with the Rockies in 2018

On July 28, 2015, the Blue Jays traded Hoffman, José Reyes, Miguel Castro, and Jesús Tinoco, to the Colorado Rockies in exchange for Troy Tulowitzki and LaTroy Hawkins. Hoffman was assigned to the Double-A New Britain Rock Cats of the Eastern League following the trade. Hoffman began the 2016 season with the Albuquerque Isotopes of the Triple-A Pacific Coast League. He was selected to appear in the 2016 All-Star Futures Game. Hoffman made his major league debut for the Rockies on August 20. Hoffman remained in the rotation for the rest of the season, finishing with a record of 0–4 and a 4.88 ERA, with 17 walks and 19 strikeouts across 31 1/3 innings pitched.

The following season, Hoffman split time between Albuquerque and the Rockies' rotation. In 23 games (16 starts) for Colorado, he was 6–5 with a 5.89 ERA and 82 strikeouts. In 2018, Hoffman spent the majority of the season at the Triple-A level, only making six appearances for the Rockies, in which he struggled to a 9.35 ERA with five strikeouts over 8 2/3 innings. In 2019, with Colorado, Hoffman was 2–6 with a 6.56 ERA and 68 strikeouts across 15 starts. That season with Albuquerque, he was 6-8 with a 7.70 ERA and 98 strikeouts in 85 1/3 innings. In 2020, Hoffman was used exclusively out of the bullpen and in the COVID-19-shortened season, he struggled to a 9.28 ERA with 20 strikeouts in 16 games.

=== Cincinnati Reds ===
On November 25, 2020, the Colorado Rockies traded Hoffman and Case Williams to the Cincinnati Reds in exchange for Jameson Hannah and Robert Stephenson. In 2021, Hoffman made 31 appearances (11 starts) for Cincinnati, working to a 3–5 record and 4.56 ERA with 45 walks and 79 strikeouts in 73 innings pitched.

In 2022, Hoffman appeared in 35 games for the Reds, pitching to a 2–0 record and 3.83 ERA with 45 strikeouts in 44 2/3 innings pitched. On November 15, 2022, Hoffman was designated for assignment. On November 18, he was non-tendered and became a free agent.

=== Philadelphia Phillies ===
On February 26, 2023, Hoffman signed a minor league contract with the Minnesota Twins organization. On March 28, Hoffman triggered the opt-out clause in his contract after not making the Opening Day roster and became a free agent.

On March 31, 2023, Hoffman signed a minor league contract with the Philadelphia Phillies organization. The contract included a $1.3 million base salary for any time spent in the majors and contained an opt-out in early May. He made nine appearances for the Triple-A Lehigh Valley IronPigs, with an 0-2 record while registering a 7.00 ERA with 7 walks and 16 strikeouts in 9 innings pitched.

On May 1, Hoffman triggered the opt-out clause, giving the Phillies 48 hours to add him to their active roster or release him. He subsequently had his contract selected on May 4. He enjoyed a breakout season out of the bullpen, boasting a 2.41 ERA and striking out 69 batters in 52 1/3 innings pitched, an average of 11.9 strikeouts per nine innings, a career best for Hoffman. He also allowed just 29 hits, an average of 5 per nine innings, also a career best. He made eight appearances for the Phillies in the 2023 playoffs, allowing two runs in 7 innings.

Hoffman re-signed with the Phillies on a $2.2 million contract for the 2024 season, during which he earned his first All-Star selection. In 68 appearances out of the bullpen, he recorded a 2.17 ERA with 89 strikeouts and 10 saves across 66 1/3 innings pitched.

On October 9, in Game 4 of the NLDS against the New York Mets, Hoffman exited with the bases loaded in the bottom of the sixth inning with a 1-0 lead for closer Carlos Estévez. Mets star shortstop Francisco Lindor then hit a grand slam to give the Mets a 4-1 lead. They held the lead and eliminated the Phillies to advance to the NLCS, with Hoffman winding up as the losing pitcher. It was his second loss of the postseason. He finished the postseason with a 40.50 ERA.

=== Toronto Blue Jays (second stint) ===
On January 10, 2025, Hoffman signed a three-year, $33 million contract with the Toronto Blue Jays. He had initially agreed to a three-year, $40 million contract with the Baltimore Orioles, but Baltimore had backed out of the deal after his physical revealed a concern related to his throwing shoulder. It was later reported that Hoffman had also agreed to a five-year contract with the Atlanta Braves, but the team had also walked away from the deal after flagging an issue in his physical. Hoffman struggled throughout the regular season, finishing with a 4.37 ERA and allowed 15 home runs in 68 innings, the second most for a reliever that year, including 13 which were in the 9th inning or later. He accumulated 33 saves in the regular season, but blew seven saves, finishing with a SV% of just 82.5%.

In Game 7 of the 2025 American League Championship Series versus the Seattle Mariners, Hoffman struck out the side in the top of the ninth inning, sending the Blue Jays to the World Series for the first time since 1993.

In Game 7 of the 2025 World Series versus the Los Angeles Dodgers, Miguel Rojas hit a game tying home run in the ninth inning off of Hoffman on a 3-2 count with 1 out. The Dodgers won the game and series in the eleventh inning.

In his first 12 appearances of 2026, Hoffman struggled as he converted 3 saves out of 6 opportunities and complied to a 7.59 ERA. The Blue Jays removed Hoffman from the closer role on April 24. In 51 total appearances for Toronto, he compiled a 6–7 record and 3.94 ERA with 75 strikeouts and five saves over 48 innings of work.

=== Minnesota Twins ===
On August 3, 2026, the Blue Jays traded Hoffman to the Minnesota Twins in exchange for Dasan Hill, John Klein, and Dameury Pena.
