= Ernie Clement =

American baseball player (born 1996)

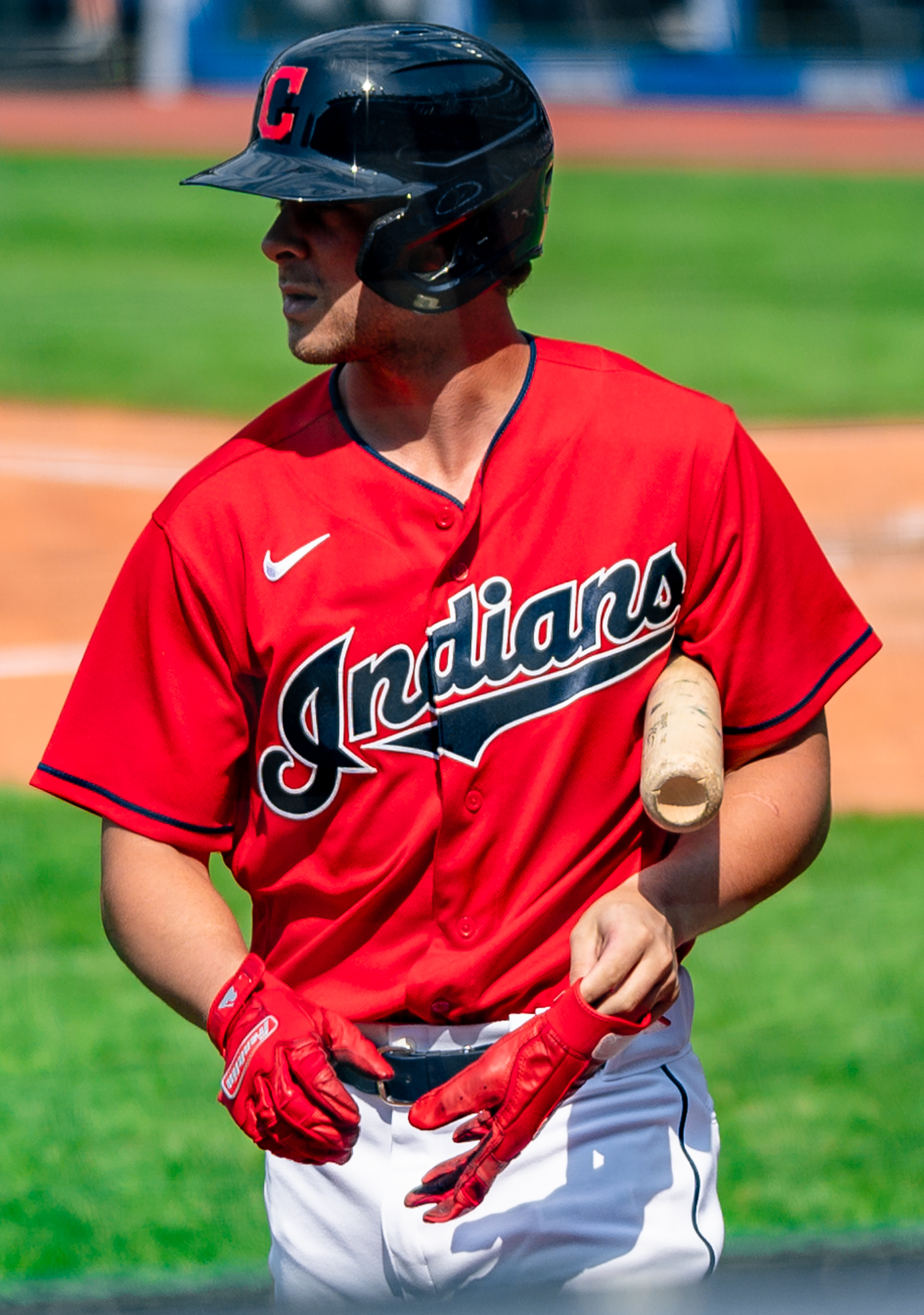
- Clement with the Cleveland Indians in 2021

Toronto Blue Jays – No. 22
- Utility player
- Born: March 22, 1996 (age 30); Rochester, New York, U.S.
- Bats: Right Throws: Right

MLB debut
- June 13, 2021, for the Cleveland Indians

MLB statistics (through 2026 season)
- Batting average: .260
- Home runs: 34
- Runs batted in: 174
- Stats at Baseball Reference

Teams
- Cleveland Indians / Guardians (2021–2022); Oakland Athletics (2022); Toronto Blue Jays (2023–present)

Career highlights and awards
- All-Star (2026); MLB records: Most hits in a single postseason: 30 (2025)
Medals
Men's baseball
Representing United States
World Baseball Classic
Silver medal – second place	2026 Miami	Team

Ernie James Clement (/kləˈmɛnt/; born March 22, 1996) is an American professional baseball utility player for the Toronto Blue Jays of Major League Baseball (MLB). He has previously played in MLB for the Cleveland Indians/Cleveland Guardians and the Oakland Athletics. Internationally, he plays for the United States national baseball team.

Clement was selected by the Cleveland Indians in the fourth round of the 2017 MLB draft, and made his MLB debut with them in 2021. He holds the record for the most hits in an MLB postseason with 30, which he set in 2025. Clement was named to his first All-Star game in 2026.

== Amateur career ==
Clement attended Brighton High School in Rochester, New York, where he played baseball, ice hockey, freshman football and, as a senior, soccer, "just ... to try something new." From the ages of 9–13, he also played lacrosse. In middle school, he played for his school's volleyball team and played CYO basketball. As a senior hockey player for the combined Brighton/East Rochester/Honeoye Falls–Lima team, he led Monroe County in scoring with 27 goals and 25 assists.

For his high school baseball career, he hit .472. The year before his high school graduation, he attended a baseball camp at the University of Virginia where he attracted attention from the Virginia Cavaliers and Radford Highlanders baseball programs. As a senior, he hit .528 with no strikeouts and accepted a partial scholarship to play college baseball at Virginia. Undrafted out of high school in the 2014 MLB draft, he honored his commitment and enrolled at the University of Virginia.

In 2015, Clement's first year with the Virginia Cavaliers, he played in 62 games (61 starts), hitting .245/.303/.310 with one home run and 22 runs batted in (RBIs). He hit .292 in the 2015 College World Series and was named to the All-CWS Team, helping Virginia win their first ever national title. He spent the summer playing in the Northwoods League with the Wisconsin Rapids Rafters. In his second year at Virginia in 2016, he batted .351/.383/.443 with one home run and 30 RBIs in 60 games (all starts), earning a spot on the All-Atlantic Coast Conference Third Team. In the summer of 2016, he played in the Cape Cod Baseball League for the Harwich Mariners where he was named the league's Most Valuable Player after hitting .353 with 59 hits in 40 games while primarily playing center field. In 2017, his third year with Virginia, he hit .315 with two home runs and 34 RBIs in 58 games, earning All-ACC Third Team honors for the second consecutive year. In 745 collegiate at-bats, Clement struck out only 31 times, and walked 34 times.

== Professional career ==
=== Cleveland Indians / Guardians ===
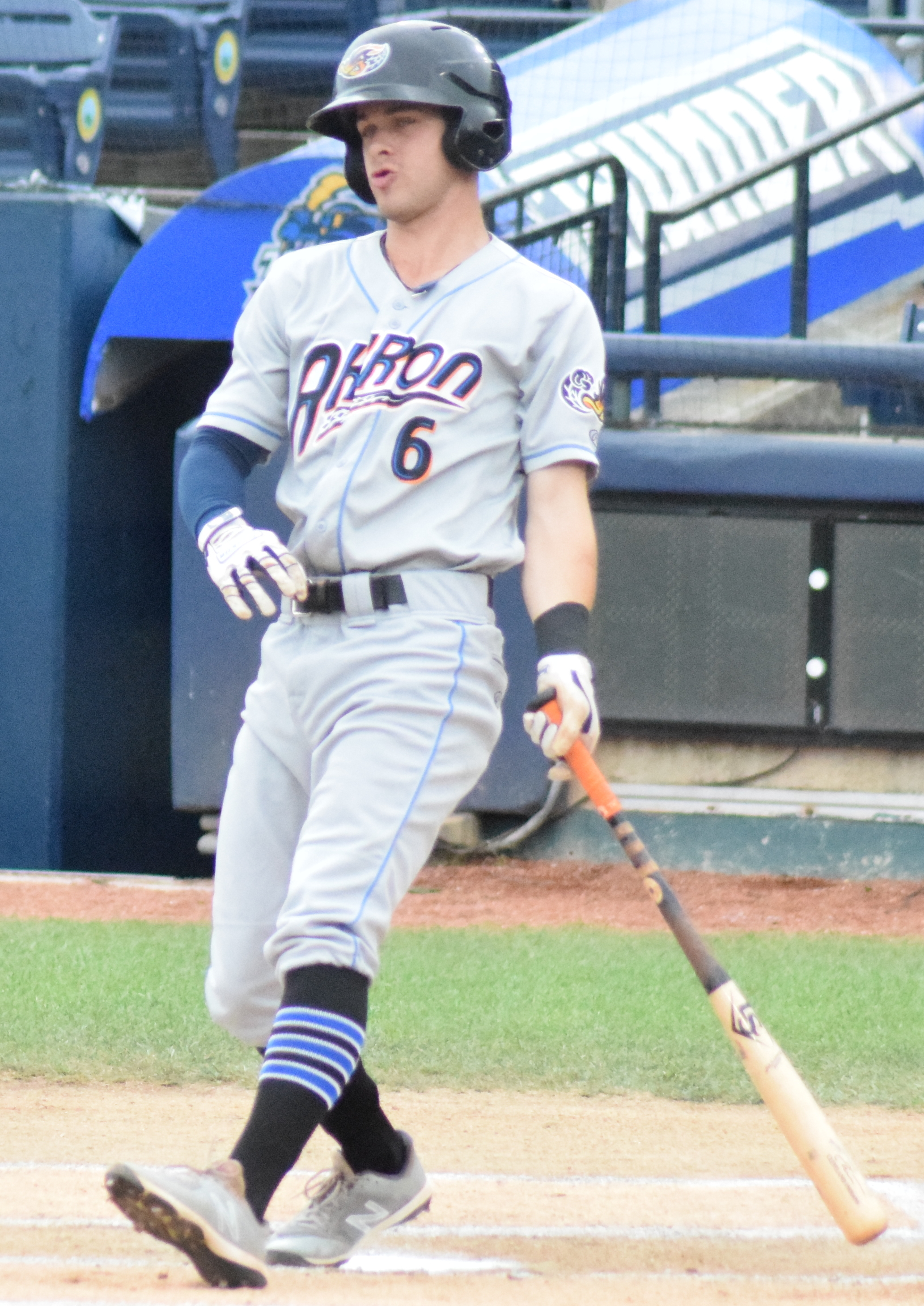
Clement with the Akron RubberDucks in 2019

The Cleveland Indians selected Clement in the fourth round of the 2017 MLB draft. He signed with Cleveland and made his professional debut with the Mahoning Valley Scrappers of the Low–A New York–Penn League, hitting .280/.315/.343 with 13 RBIs in 45 games. He began 2018 with the Lake County Captains of the Single–A Midwest League and was promoted to the Lynchburg Hillcats of the High–A Carolina League and Akron RubberDucks of the Double–A Eastern League during the season. Over 102 total games between the three clubs, he slashed .289/.358/.375 with two home runs, 33 RBIs, and 18 stolen bases, while being caught stealing 10 times, and played exclusively shortstop.

Clement returned to Akron to begin 2019, but missed a month during the season with an adductor strain. At the end of the year, he played in three games for the Columbus Clippers of the Triple–A International League. Over 101 games during the year, Clement batted .269/.323/.331 with one home run, 28 RBIs, and 17 stolen bases while being caught 10 times. He was selected to play in the Arizona Fall League for the Mesa Solar Sox following the season. Clement did not play a minor league game in 2020 due to the cancellation of the minor league season caused by the COVID-19 pandemic. The Indians added him to the 40-man roster on November 20, 2020. To begin the 2021 season, he returned to Columbus, now members of the newly-formed Triple-A East; playing 33 games for them and two games for Akron he batted a combined .244/.287/.382 with one home run and 10 RBIs in 145 plate appearances.

On May 30, 2021, Clement was promoted to the major leagues for the first time as the 27th man on the Indians' roster for the second game of their doubleheader against the Toronto Blue Jays; he did not make an appearance in that game and was optioned back to Columbus the next day. Clement was recalled by the Indians on June 13, 2021. He made his major league debut that same day as a pinch hitter against the Seattle Mariners, striking out in his first major league plate appearance. For the season, playing 40 games for Cleveland he hit .231/.285/.339 with three home runs and nine RBIs in 133 plate appearances.

On June 27, 2022, Clement became the first position player to pitch for Cleveland since Mike Freeman on June 29, 2019, and gave up six hits and four earned runs in two innings in two games. He appeared in 64 games for Cleveland in 2022, hitting .200/.264/.221 with no home runs and six RBIs. Clement was designated for assignment on September 21, 2022.

=== Oakland Athletics ===
Clement was claimed off waivers by the Oakland Athletics on September 23, 2022. He appeared in six games for Oakland, going 1-for-18 (.056) with a double.

On December 13, Clement was designated for assignment following the signings of Aledmys Díaz and Jace Peterson. He cleared waivers and was sent outright to the Triple-A Las Vegas Aviators on December 16, but never played for them. Clement was released by the Athletics on March 12, 2023.

=== Toronto Blue Jays ===
On March 14, 2023, Clement signed a minor league contract with the Toronto Blue Jays organization. He played in 35 games for the Triple-A Buffalo Bisons, hitting .328/.409/.512 with five home runs, 25 RBIs, and six stolen bases. On May 23, Clement's contract was selected to the active roster.

In 2024, Clement batted .263/.284/.408. While playing at second base, shortstop, and third base, Clement recorded 10 Defensive Runs Saved (DRS). Despite playing only 661 innings as a third baseman, he was named a finalist for a Gold Glove Award for third base.

In 2025, he batted .277/.313/.398 and played more than 60 innings at all four infield positions (predominantly third base and second base) to help the Blue Jays win the American League East for the first time in ten seasons. He was nominated for Gold Gloves at both third base (despite only playing 603 defensive innings at third base) and the utility position, but did not win for either.

Clement had an offensive surge in the postseason which made him a fan favorite, as the Jays reached the World Series. In the eighth inning of Game 7 of the World Series, Clement hit a double off Dodgers reliever Emmet Sheehan for his third hit of the game. This was his 30th hit of the 2025 postseason and a record for most hits in a single MLB postseason, passing Randy Arozarena's 29 hits in the 2020 postseason (Blue Jays teammate Vladimir Guerrero Jr. would end the 2025 postseason also with 29 hits.) He nearly had a championship-clinching hit in the bottom of the ninth inning of Game 7 with two outs and the bases loaded, but his fly ball to the warning track in left-center field was caught by Dodger center fielder Andy Pages while colliding with left fielder Enrique Hernández; the Blue Jays would go on to lose in extra innings. Clement's 22 singles in the 2025 postseason were also a record. He finished the playoffs hitting .411 (30-for-77), with a .977 OPS, six doubles, one triple, one home run, nine RBIs and 13 runs scored, and having played every inning of the postseason.

In January 2026, Clement and the Jays avoided arbitration with a $4.6 million deal for the 2026 season. He was named the starting second baseman for the American League in the 2026 Major League Baseball All-Star Game, his first All-Star selection. Clement played in 158 games for the Blue Jays and ended the season with a .259/.285/.364 slash line with nine home runs, 48 RBIs, and 33 doubles.
