= Braydon Fisher =

American baseball player (born 2000)

Toronto Blue Jays – No. 63
- Pitcher
- Born: July 26, 2000 (age 26); League City, Texas, U.S.
- Bats: Right Throws: Right

MLB debut
- May 11, 2025, for the Toronto Blue Jays

MLB statistics (through 2026 season)
- Win–loss record: 10–4
- Earned run average: 3.01
- Strikeouts: 136
- Stats at Baseball Reference

Teams
- Toronto Blue Jays (2025–present)

Braydon Fisher (born July 26, 2000) is an American professional baseball pitcher for the Toronto Blue Jays of Major League Baseball (MLB). He made his MLB debut in 2025.

== Career ==
=== Los Angeles Dodgers ===
Fisher attended Clear Falls High School in League City, Texas. He was selected by the Los Angeles Dodgers in the fourth round (134th overall) of the 2018 Major League Baseball draft. Fisher made his professional debut with the rookie-level Arizona League Dodgers. He later underwent Tommy John surgery, causing him to miss the entirety of the 2019 season.

Fisher did not play in a game in 2020 due to the cancellation of the minor league season because of the COVID-19 pandemic. He returned to action in 2021 with the Single-A Rancho Cucamonga Quakes. In 23 appearances (two starts) for the affiliate, Fisher posted a 5-3 record and 6.56 ERA with 83 strikeouts over 70 innings of work.

Fisher split the 2022 season between Rancho Cucamonga and the High-A Great Lakes Loons, accumulating a 4-4 record and 4.61 ERA with 72 strikeouts in 52 2/3 innings pitched across 39 appearances out of the bullpen. He split the 2023 season between Great Lakes and the Double-A Tulsa Drillers. In 46 appearances (one start) for the two affiliates, Fisher logged a cumulative 6-4 record and 2.77 ERA with 90 strikeouts and five saves over 65 innings of work.

Fisher began the 2024 season with Tulsa, and was promoted to the Triple-A Oklahoma City Baseball Club after seven appearances.

=== Toronto Blue Jays ===
On June 12, 2024, the Dodgers traded Fisher to the Toronto Blue Jays in exchange for Cavan Biggio. In 14 appearances down the stretch for the Double-A New Hampshire Fisher Cats, he recorded a 2.76 ERA with 26 strikeouts across 16 1/3 innings pitched.

On May 7, 2025, Fisher was selected to the 40-man roster and promoted to the major leagues for the first time. On May 11, he made his MLB debut against the Seattle Mariners, pitching a scoreless ninth inning to close out a 9-1 Blue Jays win. On May 22, Fisher earned his first career win, retiring Elías Díaz as the final out of a 7-6 victory over the San Diego Padres.
