= Nathan Lukes =

American baseball player (born 1994)

- Lukes with the Blue Jays in 2026

Toronto Blue Jays – No. 38
- Outfielder
- Born: July 12, 1994 (age 32); Sacramento, California, U.S.
- Bats: Left Throws: Right

MLB debut
- March 30, 2023, for the Toronto Blue Jays

MLB statistics (through 2026 season)
- Batting average: .267
- Home runs: 23
- Runs batted in: 118
- Stats at Baseball Reference

Teams
- Toronto Blue Jays (2023–present)

Nathan Donald Lukes (/ˈluːkəs/ LOO-kəs; born July 12, 1994) is an American professional baseball outfielder for the Toronto Blue Jays of Major League Baseball (MLB). He made his MLB debut in 2023.

== High school and college ==
Lukes grew up in Antelope, California and attended Center High School. He enrolled at California State University, Sacramento and played college baseball for the Sacramento State Hornets for three seasons. He was named All-Western Athletic Conference (WAC) after hitting .347 with 26 RBI and 54 runs scored in his sophomore season. After the season, Lukes played collegiate summer baseball for the Victoria HarbourCats in the West Coast League. He repeated as a first team All-WAC selection as a junior after batting for a .345 average with 81 total hits, seven home runs, 38 RBI, and 13 stolen bases. Lukes finished his collegiate career as Sacramento State's all-time hit leader with 244.

== Professional career ==
=== Cleveland Indians ===
The Cleveland Indians selected Lukes in the seventh round of the 2015 Major League Baseball draft. After signing with the team he was assigned to the Mahoning Valley Scrappers, where he played in five games before missing the rest of the season after breaking his right hand. He began the 2016 season with the Single–A Lake County Captains before being promoted to the High–A Lynchburg Hillcats.

=== Tampa Bay Rays ===
On August 1, 2016, the Indians included Lukes in a trade with the Tampa Bay Rays in return for Brandon Guyer. Lukes started the 2017 season in Charlotte before being promoted to the Double-A Montgomery Biscuits after six games. Lukes returned to Montgomery in 2018, playing in 115 games and batting .278/.331/.400 with 6 home runs, 51 RBI, and 9 stolen bases.

Lukes played for the Triple-A Durham Bulls in 2019, where he batted .219/.294/.319 with four home runs and 31 RBI in 91 games. He did not play a game in 2020 due to the cancellation of the minor league season because of the COVID-19 pandemic. Lukes was named to the Rays' 2021 Spring Training roster as a non-roster invitee. He spent the entirety of the 2021 season with Durham, playing in 85 games and batting .303/.352/.456 with 4 home runs and 44 RBI.

=== Toronto Blue Jays ===
On November 29, 2021, Lukes signed a minor league contract with the Toronto Blue Jays and was invited to spring training. Lukes played in 111 games for the Triple-A Buffalo Bisons, hitting .285/.364/.425 with 11 home runs, 61 RBI, and 20 stolen bases.

On November 10, 2022, the Blue Jays added Lukes to their 40-man roster to protect him from the Rule 5 draft. On March 28, 2023, Lukes was announced as the final member of Toronto's Opening Day roster. In 29 games for Toronto, he batted .192/.290/.308 with no home runs and two RBI.

Lukes was optioned to Triple–A Buffalo to begin the 2024 season. He was recalled to the majors on May 3, but sent back down again on May 4 without playing. On June 14, Lukes underwent surgery to repair the UCL in his left thumb. On September 28, Lukes hit his first career home run, a solo shot off of Miami Marlins starter Xzavion Curry.

== Personal life ==
Lukes and his wife, Taylor, were married in 2018 and have one daughter and one son.
