= Brendon Little =

American baseball player (born 1996)

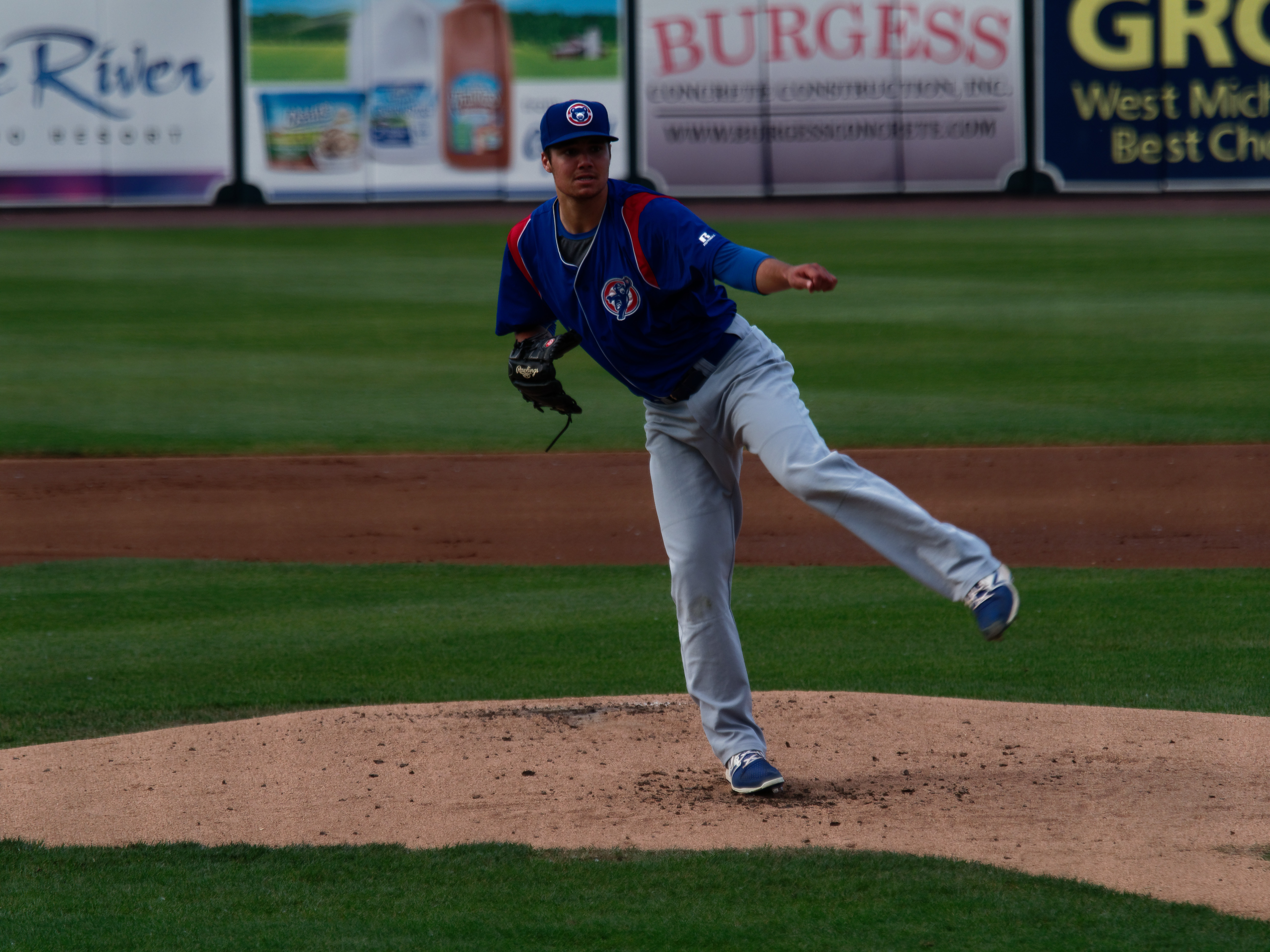
- Brendon Little pitching for the South Bend Cubs

Toronto Blue Jays – No. 54
- Pitcher
- Born: August 11, 1996 (age 30); Bryn Mawr, Pennsylvania, U.S.
- Bats: Left Throws: Left

MLB debut
- August 30, 2022, for the Chicago Cubs

MLB statistics (through 2026 season)
- Win–loss record: 5–8
- Earned run average: 4.09
- Strikeouts: 171
- Stats at Baseball Reference

Teams
- Chicago Cubs (2022); Toronto Blue Jays (2024–present)

Brendon David Little (born August 11, 1996) is an American professional baseball pitcher for the Toronto Blue Jays of Major League Baseball (MLB). He has previously played in MLB for the Chicago Cubs.

== Amateur career ==
Little graduated from Conestoga High School in 2015. He was drafted by the San Francisco Giants in the 36th round of the 2015 MLB draft, but he chose not to sign and instead decided to enroll at the University of North Carolina to play college baseball. After appearing in only four games as a freshman in 2016, he transferred to the State College of Florida, Manatee–Sarasota. In 2016, he played collegiate summer baseball with the Bourne Braves of the Cape Cod Baseball League, and was named a league all-star. In 2017, his sophomore year, he went 5–3 with a 2.53 ERA in 15 starts.

== Professional career ==
=== Chicago Cubs ===
After his sophomore season, Little was drafted by the Chicago Cubs in the first round of the 2017 MLB draft. He signed, and was assigned to the Eugene Emeralds, where he went 0–2 with a 9.37 ERA in six starts.

Little spent the 2018 season with the South Bend Cubs, compiling a 5–11 record with 5.15 ERA in 22 games (21 starts). Little began 2019 with the Myrtle Beach Pelicans on the injured list. After being activated from the IL, he returned to South Bend before being promoted back to Myrtle Beach. Over six starts with South Bend, he compiled a 1.91 ERA, and over four starts with the Pelicans, he went 2–1 with a 5.95 ERA.

Little did not play a minor league game in 2020 due to the cancellation of the minor league season caused by the COVID-19 pandemic. In 2021, he saw action as a reliever, pitching with the Tennessee Smokies and Iowa Cubs for the majority of the season. He found relative success in this new role, accruing a 3.24 ERA across 26 games with 53 strikeouts.

On August 30, 2022, the Cubs selected Little's contract and promoted him to the major leagues for the first time. He made his MLB debut that day, pitching against the Toronto Blue Jays. On September 1, Little was removed from the 40–man roster and returned back to Triple-A Iowa.

In 2023, Little spent the season with Triple–A Iowa, making 50 appearances and registering a 4.05 ERA with 73 strikeouts across 73 1/3 innings of work.

=== Toronto Blue Jays ===
On November 6, 2023, Little was traded to the Toronto Blue Jays in exchange for cash considerations; he was subsequently added to the team's 40-man roster. He was optioned to the Triple–A Buffalo Bisons to begin the 2024 season. On June 1, 2024, the Blue Jays selected Little's contract, adding him to their active roster when Jordan Romano was placed on the 15-day injured list due to inflammation in his right elbow. In the 2024 season, Little posted a 1–2 record with a 3.74 ERA while striking out 36 batters in 45 2/3 innings.

On October 27, 2025, Little surrendered the game-winning home run in the bottom of the 18th inning of Game 3 of the 2025 World Series to the Los Angeles Dodgers’ Freddie Freeman.

On April 5, 2026, Little was optioned to Triple-A Buffalo, after starting the 2026 season with record of 0-2 with a 24.55 ERA while giving up 3 home runs (including a grand slam).
