= 2024 Toronto Blue Jays season =

Major League Baseball season

2024 Toronto Blue Jays
- League: American League
- Division: East
- Ballpark: Rogers Centre
- City: Toronto, Ontario
- Record: 74–88 (.457)
- Divisional place: 5th
- Owners: Rogers, CEO Mark Shapiro
- General manager: Ross Atkins
- Manager: John Schneider
- Television: Sportsnet; Sportsnet One
- Radio: Blue Jays Radio Network; Sportsnet 590 the FAN

The 2024 Toronto Blue Jays season was the franchise's 48th season in Major League Baseball, and 33rd full season (35th overall) at Rogers Centre. The Blue Jays failed to improve on their record from the previous season, finishing with their first losing season since 2019. On September 20, they were eliminated from postseason contention.

== Previous season ==
The 2023 Blue Jays finished third in the AL East, behind the Tampa Bay Rays and the Baltimore Orioles, with a record of 89–73 (.549). They qualified for the postseason, but lost in two games in the Wild Card Series to the Minnesota Twins in Minnesota.

== Offseason ==
=== Departing free agents ===
- On November 2, 2023: DH Brandon Belt, IF Matt Chapman, RHP Jordan Hicks and LHP Hyun-jin Ryu elected free agency
- On November 3, 2023: IF Whit Merrifield elected free agency
- On November 17, 2023: RHP Adam Cimber elected free agency

=== Trades ===
- On November 6, 2023: Acquired LHP Brendon Little from the Chicago Cubs in exchange for cash
- On February 13, 2024: Acquired cash considerations from the San Francisco Giants in exchange for IF Otto Lopez

=== Waiver transactions ===
- On December 1, 2023: C Tyler Heineman claimed off waivers by the New York Mets
- On January 16, 2024: C Brian Serven claimed off waivers from the Chicago Cubs

=== Free agent signings ===
- On November 16, 2023: Signed IF Rafael Lantigua to a minor league contract
- On December 1, 2023: Signed IF Andrew Bechtold to a minor league contract
- On December 8, 2023: Signed C Payton Henry to a minor league contract
- On December 21, 2023: Signed RHP Paolo Espino to a minor league contract
- On December 28, 2023: Signed OF Kevin Kiermaier to a one-year $10.5 million deal
- On December 29, 2023: Signed IF Isiah Kiner-Falefa to a two-year $15 million deal
- On January 15, 2024: Signed C Esmeiquel Arrieche, IF J.T. Bain, OF Wilmer Blanca, IF Rafael Flores, RHP Johandi Medina, RHP Carlos Olivo, RHP Angel Rivero, C Franklin Rojas & C Randy Soto to minor league contracts
- On January 16, 2024: Signed OF Pascual Archila, OF Andres Arias, RHP Ismauro Bueno, RHP Alan Carter, RHP Rafael De Jesus, RHP Victor Espiritu, SS Angel Guzman, IF Endry Reyes, IF Juarlin Soto & RHP Pedro Tucent to minor league contracts
- On January 18, 2024: Signed RHP Josue Loreto to a minor league contract
- On January 21, 2024: Signed RHP Jordan Powell to a minor league contract
- On January 30, 2024: Signed IF Justin Turner to a one-year $13 million deal
- On February 2, 2024: Signed RHP Johnathan Lavallee to a minor league contract
- On February 9, 2024: Signed RHP Yariel Rodríguez to a five-year $32 million deal
- On February 16, 2024: Signed IF Eduardo Escobar and DH Daniel Vogelbach to minor league contracts and invited them to spring training
- On February 22, 2024: Signed RHP Nolan Long to a minor league contract
- On March 8, 2024: Signed 1B Joey Votto to a minor league contract

=== Coaching changes ===
- On October 5, 2023: Third Base Coach Luis Rivera retired
- On November 7, 2023: Carlos Febles joins Blue Jays as Third Base Coach/Infield Coach
- On November 13, 2023: DeMarlo Hale joins Blue Jays as Associate Manager
- On January 12, 2024: John Lannan joins Blue Jays as Mental Performance Coach
- On January 16, 2024: Matt Hague joins Blue Jays as Assistant Hitting Coach

== Standings ==
=== Season standings ===
==== American League East ====
AL East
Team	W	L	Pct.	GB	Home	Road
New York Yankees	94	68	.580	—	44‍–‍37	50‍–‍31
Baltimore Orioles	91	71	.562	3	44‍–‍37	47‍–‍34
Boston Red Sox	81	81	.500	13	38‍–‍43	43‍–‍38
Tampa Bay Rays	80	82	.494	14	42‍–‍39	38‍–‍43
Toronto Blue Jays	74	88	.457	20	39‍–‍42	35‍–‍46

==== American League Wild Card ====
Division leaders
Team	W	L	Pct.
New York Yankees	94	68	.580
Cleveland Guardians	92	69	.571
Houston Astros	88	73	.547

Wild Card teams (Top 3 teams qualify for postseason)
Team	W	L	Pct.	GB
Baltimore Orioles	91	71	.562	+5
Kansas City Royals	86	76	.531	—
Detroit Tigers	86	76	.531	—
Seattle Mariners	85	77	.525	1
Minnesota Twins	82	80	.506	4
Boston Red Sox	81	81	.500	5
Tampa Bay Rays	80	82	.494	6
Texas Rangers	78	84	.481	8
Toronto Blue Jays	74	88	.457	12
Oakland Athletics	69	93	.426	17
Los Angeles Angels	63	99	.389	23
Chicago White Sox	41	121	.253	45

== Records vs opponents ==
	Record			Games Left		
Opponent	Home	Road	Total	Home	Road	Total
AL East
Baltimore Orioles	4–3	2–4	6–7	–	–	–
Boston Red Sox	1–5	4–3	5–8	–	–	–
New York Yankees	4–3	2–4	6–7	–	–	–
Tampa Bay Rays	2–4	2–5	4–9	–	–	–
Totals	11–15	10–16	21–31	–	–	–
AL Central
Chicago White Sox	2–1	3–0	5–1	–	–	–
Cleveland Guardians	2–1	0–3	2–4	–	–	–
Detroit Tigers	1–2	1–3	2–5	–	–	–
Kansas City Royals	1–2	1–3	2–5	–	–	–
Minnesota Twins	1–2	1–2	2–4	–	–	–
Totals	7–8	6–11	13–19	–	–	–
AL West
Houston Astros	1–3	1–2	2–5	–	–	–
Los Angeles Angels	4–0	3–0	7–0	–	–	–
Oakland Athletics	1–2	2–1	3–3	–	–	–
Seattle Mariners	2–1	2–1	4–2	–	–	–
Texas Rangers	3–0	1–2	4–2	–	–	–
Totals	11–6	9–6	20–12	–	–	–
National League
Arizona Diamondbacks	–	1–2	1–2	–	–	–
Atlanta Braves	–	1–2	1–2	–	–	–
Chicago Cubs	–	1–2	1–2	–	–	–
Cincinnati Reds	1–2	–	1–2	–	–	–
Colorado Rockies	2–1	–	2–1	–	–	–
Los Angeles Dodgers	1–2	–	1–2	–	–	–
Miami Marlins	0–3	–	0–3	–	–	–
Milwaukee Brewers	–	1–2	1–2	–	–	–
New York Mets	1–2	–	1–2	–	–	–
Philadelphia Phillies	0–2	1–1	1–3	–	–	–
Pittsburgh Pirates	2–1	–	2–1	–	–	–
San Diego Padres	–	2–1	2–1	–	–	–
San Francisco Giants	–	2–1	2–1	–	–	–
St. Louis Cardinals	3–0	–	3–0	–	–	–
Washington Nationals	–	1–2	1–2	–	–	–
Totals	10–13	10–13	20–26	–	–	–
Grand Totals	39–42	35–46	74–88	–	–	–

Month	Games	Won	Lost	Pct.
March	4	2	2	.500
April	27	13	14	.481
May	25	12	13	.480
June	27	11	16	.407
July	26	12	14	.462
August	29	17	12	.586
September	24	7	17	.292
Totals	162	74	88	.457

== 2024 draft ==
The 2024 Major League Baseball draft began on July 14. The Blue Jays gained a compensation selection at the end of the fourth round due to Matt Chapman signing with the San Francisco Giants after having been given a qualifying offer.

Round	Pick	Player	Position	College/School	Nationality	Signed
1	20	Trey Yesavage	RHP	East Carolina University	(United States)	August 1
2	59	Khal Stephen	RHP	Mississippi State University	(United States)	July 22
3	95	Johnny King	LHP	Naples High School (FL)	(United States)	July 22
4	125	Sean Keys	3B	Bucknell University	(United States)	July 22
4C	136	Nick Mitchell	OF	Indiana University Bloomington	(United States)	July 21
5	158	Jackson Wentworth	RHP	Kansas State	(United States)	July 22
6	187	Aaron Parker	C	University of California, Santa Barbara	(United States)	July 22
7	217	Austin Cates	RHP	University of Nevada, Las Vegas	(United States)	July 24
8	247	Eddie Micheletti Jr.	OF	Virginia Tech	(United States)	July 22
9	277	Colby Holcombe	RHP	Mississippi State University	(United States)	July 21
10	307	Carter Cunningham	OF	East Carolina University	(United States)	July 17

== Regular season ==
=== Opening Day ===
As of August 2024, three players on the Opening Day roster are no longer with the team: Cavan Biggio, Kevin Kiermaier and Justin Turner. Of the starters, the only players that remain are George Springer, Daulton Varsho, Vladimir Guerrero Jr., Alejandro Kirk and José Berríos. Bo Bichette was on the Injured List.

Opening Day starters
Position	Name
Catcher	Alejandro Kirk
First baseman	Vladimir Guerrero Jr.
Second baseman	Cavan Biggio
Shortstop	Bo Bichette
Third baseman	Isiah Kiner-Falefa
Left fielder	Daulton Varsho
Center fielder	Kevin Kiermaier
Right fielder	George Springer
Designated hitter	Justin Turner
Pitcher	José Berríos

=== March and April ===
The Blue Jays opened the 2024 campaign on the road for a season-long ten-game road trip, due to ongoing renovations to the Rogers Centre, the home stadium. The Jays split their opening series with the Tampa Bay Rays, with each team winning two games. Reliever Génesis Cabrera was suspended for three games due to a physical altercation with Rays shortstop José Caballero during the third game of the series, though the suspension was reduced to two games after appeal. Toronto then began a three-game series with the Houston Astros in Houston, losing the first game after Ronel Blanco threw the first no-hitter of the 2024 MLB season. The Blue Jays would win the second game before being one-hit in the final game, setting a new franchise-low with just 38 hits through their first seven games. The Blue Jays would take their first game against the New York Yankees 3–0, but would lose the following two games to end their road trip with a 4–6 record.

Heading to the newly renovated Rogers Centre for the first time in 2024, the Blue Jays defeated the Seattle Mariners 5–2 in their home opener, and would take two of three games to win their first series of the season. The Jays lost the opening game against the Colorado Rockies, but rallied to take the next two and win the series. Newly signed pitcher Yariel Rodríguez made his debut during the series where he struck out six batters and only got one earned run but did not get credited with the win. They carried that success into their final series of the homestand against the Yankees, winning the first two games and nearly taking the third before the bullpen allowed four runs in the ninth inning to lose the game, 6–4. The Blue Jays then travelled to San Diego for the first time since the 2013 season to take on the Padres. Toronto won two of three games to take their fourth consecutive series victory. The Blue Jays then continued to Kansas City to take on the Royals, where they lost three of the four games, all by one run; the last was called after the top of the fifth due to rain. The Blue Jays then lost a three-game set against the Los Angeles Dodgers at home. The first game was marked by two-way player Shohei Ohtani hitting a home run in the first inning after he was booed by Toronto fans, following an off-season in which he was reported by some journalists to be signing with the team.

=== May ===
The month began with another series loss to the Royals, this time at home. Next, they lost two of three to the Washington Nationals on the road. Alek Manoah made his return to the rotation in the last game. Afterwards, they split two games with the Philadelphia Phillies with the win in the final game breaking an 11-game win streak at home for the Phillies. They then lost a series against the Twins at home, followed up by a two-game (middle game was rained out and was made up in a doubleheader later in the season) split against the Orioles at Camden Yards. A series loss to the Rays and series win against the White Sox at home followed. From May 23 to 26, the Blue Jays lost three of four to the Detroit Tigers on the road, punctuated by a 14–11 loss in the final game after Matt Vierling hit a three-run walk-off home run. The loss brought the Blue Jays to a then-season-low six games under .500. However, they followed that series by sweeping the White Sox in a three-game set on the road. On May 31, the Blue Jays debuted their new City Connect Jerseys with the theme entitled "Night Mode" where they played against the Pittsburgh Pirates where they won at the bottom of the 14th inning thanks to a walk-off home run from Davis Schneider.

=== June ===
From June 17 to 24, the Blue Jays lost seven games in a row; the streak was snapped by a victory at Fenway Park against the Red Sox. By then, they had fallen to six and a half games back of the final wild card playoff spot with a record of 36–43. On June 23, infielder Orelvis Martínez, who made his MLB debut a few days earlier, was suspended 80 games for testing positive for performance-enhancing substance clomifene, which he claims is being taken for addressing fertility issues.

=== July ===
On July 25, the Blue Jays suffered their worst loss of the season when they lost 13–0 to the Tampa Bay Rays. Earlier that day, Kevin Kiermaier announced his retirement after the 2024 season. From July 26 to 28, the Blue Jays rebounded and swept the World Series Champions, the Texas Rangers. Before the week of the 2024 trade deadline, the Blue Jays traded away Cavan Biggio and placed Kevin Kiermaier on waivers where he was cleared. During the week of the 2024 trade deadline, as well as during trade deadline day itself, the Blue Jays traded away Yimi García, Nate Pearson, Danny Jansen, Justin Turner, Yusei Kikuchi, Trevor Richards, Isiah Kiner-Falefa, and Kevin Kiermaier. Except for the Kiermaier trade in which the Blue Jays received veteran pitcher Ryan Yarbrough from the Los Angeles Dodgers, the Blue Jays received prospects or rookies from all of these trades.

=== August ===
The month of August began with a homestand consisting of a three-game series against the Baltimore Orioles and then a three-game series against the Oakland Athletics. They won the series against Baltimore by winning the first and third games but fell to Oakland in the last two games, after winning the first. From August 12 to 14, the Blue Jays began a three-game road series in Anaheim against the Los Angeles Angels where they won with a three-game sweep. Will Wagner, infielder and son of Billy Wagner and acquired from the Kikuchi trade with the Houston Astros, made his MLB debut in the series and made history by getting three hits during his MLB debut. From August 16 to 18, the Blue Jays played a three-game road series against the Chicago Cubs where they lost the first two games before salvaging the final one; every game in that series was decided by one run.

The June 26 game between the Blue Jays and Red Sox at Fenway Park had been suspended due to rain, with catcher Danny Jansen batting for the Blue Jays at the time. With the game scheduled to resume on August 26 as part of a doubleheader, Jansen, as a member of the Red Sox active roster, became the first player in major-league history to play for both teams in the same game. The Blue Jays would win that game 4–1.

=== September ===
On September 11, in the rubber game of a three-game set against the New York Mets at home, Blue Jays pitcher Bowden Francis pitched eight innings of no-hit ball before it was broken up in the ninth inning by a Francisco Lindor home run, in a game the Mets wound up winning 6–2. It marked the second time in three weeks that Francis had taken a hitter into the ninth inning; on August 24 against the Los Angeles Angels, his no-hitter was broken up by Taylor Ward who also homered to lead off the ninth inning. He became the first pitcher since Nolan Ryan in 1989 to lose two no-hit bids in the ninth inning in the same season.

=== Game log ===
Legend
Blue Jays win	Blue Jays loss	Game postponed	Eliminated from playoff race

2024 Game Log: 74–88 (Home: 39–42; Away: 35–46)
March: 2–2 (Home: 0–0; Away: 2–2)

#	Date	Opponent	Score	Win	Loss	Save	Attendance	Record	GB
1	March 28	@ Rays	8–2	Berríos (1–0)	Eflin (0–1)	—	25,025	1–0	–
2	March 29	@ Rays	2–8	Civale (1–0)	Bassitt (0–1)	—	18,653	1–1	1
3	March 30	@ Rays	1–5	Littell (1–0)	Kikuchi (0–1)	—	18,905	1–2	2
4	March 31	@ Rays	9–2	White (1–0)	Armstrong (0–1)	—	14,875	2–2	2

April: 13–14 (Home: 8–6; Away: 5–8)

#	Date	Opponent	Score	Win	Loss	Save	Attendance	Record	GB
5	April 1	@ Astros	0–10	Blanco (1–0)	Francis (0–1)	—	27,285	2–3	3
6	April 2	@ Astros	2–1	Green (1–0)	Hader (0–2)	—	28,811	3–3	2
7	April 3	@ Astros	0–8	Javier (1–0)	Bassitt (0–2)	—	26,279	3–4	3
8	April 5	@ Yankees	3–0	García (1–0)	Ferguson (0–1)	Green (1)	47,812	4–4	2
9	April 6	@ Yankees	8–9	Weaver (3–0)	Gausman (0–1)	Holmes (4)	42,250	4–5	3
10	April 7	@ Yankees	3–8	Cousins (1–0)	Francis (0–2)	Santana (1)	40,569	4–6	4
11	April 8	Mariners	5–2	Berríos (2–0)	Castillo (0–3)	—	40,069	5–6	4
12	April 9	Mariners	5–3	Bassitt (1–2)	Kirby (1–2)	Green (2)	31,310	6–6	4
13	April 10	Mariners	1–6 (10)	Muñoz (1–1)	Mayza (0–1)	—	22,960	6–7	4
14	April 12	Rockies	4–12	Feltner (1–1)	Gausman (0–2)	—	29,035	6–8	4½
15	April 13	Rockies	5–3	Francis (1–2)	Hudson (0–3)	García (1)	31,472	7–8	5
16	April 14	Rockies	5–0	Berríos (3–0)	Freeland (0–3)	—	27,481	8–8	4
17	April 15	Yankees	3–1	Bassitt (2–2)	Gil (0–1)	García (2)	30,962	9–8	3
18	April 16	Yankees	5–4	Kikuchi (1–1)	Rodón (1–1)	Romano (1)	31,175	10–8	2
19	April 17	Yankees	4–6	González (1–0)	Swanson (0–1)	Holmes (7)	30,233	10–9	3
20	April 19	@ Padres	5–1	Francis (2–2)	Waldron (0–2)	—	44,890	11–9	3
21	April 20	@ Padres	5–2	Berríos (4–0)	Vásquez (0–1)	Romano (2)	43,273	12–9	2
22	April 21	@ Padres	3–6	Musgrove (3–2)	Bassitt (2–3)	Suárez (7)	44,527	12–10	3
23	April 22	@ Royals	5–3	Kikuchi (2–1)	Singer (2–1)	Romano (3)	10,004	13–10	2½
24	April 23	@ Royals	2–3	Stratton (2–1)	Gausman (0–3)	McArthur (5)	11,357	13–11	3
25	April 24	@ Royals	2–3	Schreiber (2–0)	Rodríguez (0–1)	McArthur (6)	10,282	13–12	4
26	April 25	@ Royals	1–2 (5)	Ragans (1–2)	Berríos (4–1)	—	9,740	13–13	4
27	April 26	Dodgers	2–12	Stone (2–1)	Bassitt (2–4)	—	39,688	13–14	4
28	April 27	Dodgers	2–4	Glasnow (5–1)	Kikuchi (2–2)	Phillips (8)	39,405	13–15	5
29	April 28	Dodgers	3–1	Gausman (1–3)	Grove (0–1)	Romano (4)	39,053	14–15	5
30	April 29	Royals	6–5	Cabrera (1–0)	Bowlan (0–1)	Pearson (1)	29,879	15–15	4
31	April 30	Royals	1–4	Ragans (2–2)	Berríos (4–2)	McArthur (7)	27,189	15–16	5

May: 12–13 (Home: 5–6; Away: 7–7)

#	Date	Opponent	Score	Win	Loss	Save	Attendance	Record	GB
32	May 1	Royals	1–6	Lugo (5–1)	Bassitt (2–5)	—	32,307	15–17	5
33	May 3	@ Nationals	3–9	Barnes (2–0)	Swanson (0–2)	—	22,856	15–18	6½
34	May 4	@ Nationals	6–3	Gausman (2–3)	Irvin (2–3)	—	22,836	16–18	6½
35	May 5	@ Nationals	8–11	Harvey (2–1)	Cabrera (1–1)	Finnegan (11)	18,363	16–19	7½
36	May 7	@ Phillies	1–10	Sánchez (2–3)	Berríos (4–3)	—	39,492	16–20	7½
37	May 8	@ Phillies	5–3	Bassitt (3–5)	Nola (4–2)	Romano (5)	34,681	17–20	
38	May 10	Twins	2–3	Ryan (2–2)	Kikuchi (2–3)	Jax (5)	34,205	17–21	8½
39	May 11	Twins	10–8	Swanson (1–2)	Jackson (1–2)	Romano (6)	35,069	18–21	8½
40	May 12	Twins	1–5	Ober (4–1)	Manoah (0–1)	—	32,200	18–22	8½
41	May 13	@ Orioles	3–2 (10)	Romano (1–0)	Webb (0–2)	—	24,358	19–22	7½
—	May 14	@ Orioles	Postponed (rain); Makeup: July 29						
42	May 15	@ Orioles	2–3	Coulombe (1–0)	Romano (1–1)	—	29,578	19–23	9
43	May 17	Rays	3–4	Alexander (2–2)	Bassitt (3–6)	Fairbanks (4)	32,640	19–24	10½
44	May 18	Rays	4–5	Ramírez (3–0)	Pearson (0–1)	Cleavinger (3)	34,416	19–25	11½
45	May 19	Rays	5–2	Manoah (1–1)	Civale (2–4)	Romano (7)	35,840	20–25	11½
46	May 20	White Sox	9–3	Berríos (5–3)	Fedde (4–1)	—	36,993	21–25	10½
47	May 21	White Sox	0–5	Crochet (5–4)	Kikuchi (2–4)	—	28,176	21–26	10½
48	May 22	White Sox	9–2	Bassitt (4–6)	Nastrini (0–3)	—	28,670	22–26	10½
49	May 23	@ Tigers	9–1	Gausman (3–3)	Flaherty (1–4)	—	17,049	23–26	10½
50	May 24	@ Tigers	2–6	Maeda (2–1)	Manoah (1–2)	Foley (11)	27,160	23–27	11½
51	May 25	@ Tigers	1–2	Olson (1–5)	Berríos (5–4)	Holton (1)	35,331	23–28	12½
52	May 26	@ Tigers	11–14	Englert (1–0)	Romano (1–2)	—	27,627	23–29	12½
53	May 27	@ White Sox	5–1	Bassitt (5–6)	Nastrini (0–4)	—	14,993	24–29	12
54	May 28	@ White Sox	7–2	Gausman (4–3)	Woodford (0–1)	—	11,852	25–29	11
55	May 29	@ White Sox	3–1	Richards (1–0)	Flexen (2–5)	Romano (8)	11,599	26–29	11
56	May 31	Pirates	5–3 (14)	Cabrera (2–1)	Nicolas (0–1)	—	33,356	27–29	11½

June: 11–16 (Home: 7–9; Away: 4–7)

#	Date	Opponent	Score	Win	Loss	Save	Attendance	Record	GB
57	June 1	Pirates	1–8	Keller (7–3)	Kikuchi (2–5)	Ortiz (1)	36,484	27–30	12½
58	June 2	Pirates	5–4	Bassitt (6–6)	Priester (0–5)	García (3)	34,887	28–30	12½
59	June 3	Orioles	2–7	Rodriguez (6–2)	Gausman (4–4)	—	23,842	28–31	13
60	June 4	Orioles	1–10	Burnes (6–2)	Cabrera (2–2)	—	28,816	28–32	14
61	June 5	Orioles	3–2	García (2–0)	Kimbrel (4–2)	—	27,929	29–32	14
62	June 6	Orioles	6–5	Kikuchi (3–5)	Povich (0–1)	García (4)	39,215	30–32	14
63	June 7	@ Athletics	1–2	Miller (1–0)	Green (1–1)	—	16,046	30–33	14
64	June 8	@ Athletics	7–0	Gausman (5–4)	Medina (0–1)	—	9,285	31–33	13
65	June 9	@ Athletics	6–4 (10)	García (3–0)	Adams (0–2)	Cabrera (1)	11,276	32–33	13
66	June 10	@ Brewers	1–3	Rea (5–2)	Berríos (5–5)	Megill (10)	24,381	32–34	14
67	June 11	@ Brewers	3–0	Kikuchi (4–5)	Rodríguez (0–1)	García (5)	25,253	33–34	14
68	June 12	@ Brewers	4–5	Myers (3–2)	Pop (0–1)	Megill (11)	30,444	33–35	15
69	June 14	Guardians	1–3	Allen (7–3)	Gausman (5–5)	Clase (21)	36,790	33–36	15½
70	June 15	Guardians	5–0	Francis (3–2)	Carrasco (2–6)	—	39,318	34–36	14½
71	June 16	Guardians	7–6	Berríos (6–5)	Lively (6–3)	Pearson (2)	40,043	35–36	13½
72	June 17	Red Sox	3–7	Pivetta (4–4)	Kikuchi (4–6)	Jansen (12)	29,907	35–37	14
73	June 18	Red Sox	3–4	Kelly (1–1)	Little (0–1)	Jansen (13)	38,595	35–38	15
74	June 19	Red Sox	3–7	Bello (7–4)	Gausman (5–6)	—	38,906	35–39	15
75	June 21	@ Guardians	1–7	Carrasco (3–6)	Rodríguez (0–2)	—	35,868	35–40	14½
76	June 22	@ Guardians	3–6	Lively (7–3)	Berríos (6–6)	Clase (23)	37,133	35–41	15½
77	June 23	@ Guardians	5–6	Herrin (3–0)	Kikuchi (4–7)	Clase (24)	27,479	35–42	15½
78	June 24	@ Red Sox	6–7	Jansen (3–1)	Pop (0–2)	—	35,856	35–43	16
79	June 25	@ Red Sox	9–4	Gausman (6–6)	Bello (7–5)	—	34,546	36–43	15
—	June 26	@ Red Sox	Suspended (rain); Resuming August 26						
80	June 27	Yankees	9–2	Berríos (7–6)	Rodón (9–5)	—	36,423	37–43	13½
81	June 28	Yankees	5–16	Tonkin (3–3)	Kikuchi (4–8)	—	34,791	37–44	14½
82	June 29	Yankees	9–3	Bassitt (7–6)	Cortés Jr. (4–7)	—	37,448	38–44	14½
83	June 30	Yankees	1–8	Cole (1–1)	Gausman (6–7)	—	38,534	38–45	14½

July: 12–14 (Home: 6–7; Away: 6–7)

#	Date	Opponent	Score	Win	Loss	Save	Attendance	Record	GB
84	July 1	Astros	1–3	Brown (6–5)	Rodríguez (0–3)	Hader (13)	39,265	38–46	15
85	July 2	Astros	7–6	Berríos (8–6)	Arrighetti (4–7)	Green (3)	26,308	39–46	15
86	July 3	Astros	2–9	Scott (5–2)	Pop (0–3)	—	28,570	39–47	16
87	July 4	Astros	3–5	Valdez (7–5)	Bassitt (7–7)	Hader (14)	38,234	39–48	16
88	July 5	@ Mariners	1–2	Castillo (7–9)	Gausman (6–8)	Muñoz (14)	34,493	39–49	17
89	July 6	@ Mariners	5–4	Rodríguez (1–3)	Hancock (3–4)	Green (4)	38,264	40–49	16
90	July 7	@ Mariners	5–4 (10)	Green (2–1)	Snider (0–1)	Cabrera (2)	34,885	41–49	16
91	July 9	@ Giants	3–4	Miller (3–2)	Richards (1–1)	—	32,924	41–50	16
92	July 10	@ Giants	10–6	Bassitt (8–7)	Webb (7–7)	—	32,014	42–50	15
93	July 11	@ Giants	5–3	Gausman (7–8)	Hicks (4–6)	Green (5)	30,064	43–50	14
94	July 12	@ Diamondbacks	4–5	Martínez (4–1)	Green (2–2)	—	24,441	43–51	14
95	July 13	@ Diamondbacks	1–12	Díaz (1–0)	Berríos (8–7)	—	30,121	43–52	14
96	July 14	@ Diamondbacks	8–7	Richards (2–1)	Ginkel (6–2)	Green (6)	24,732	44–52	14
94th All-Star Game in Arlington, Texas
97	July 19	Tigers	4–5	Flaherty (7–5)	Bassitt (8–8)	Holton (3)	39,697	44–53	15
98	July 20	Tigers	3–7	Faedo (5–1)	Kikuchi (4–9)	—	38,583	44–54	16
99	July 21	Tigers	5–4	Gausman (8–8)	Montero (1–3)	Green (7)	38,766	45–54	15
100	July 23	Rays	2–4	Alexander (3–3)	Berríos (8–8)	Fairbanks (19)	38,575	45–55	15
101	July 24	Rays	6–3	Cabrera (3–2)	Adam (4–2)	—	32,276	46–55	14
102	July 25	Rays	0–13	Bradley (6–4)	Bassitt (8–9)	—	41,148	46–56	15
103	July 26	Rangers	6–5	Green (3–2)	Sborz (2–1)	—	35,065	47–56	14
104	July 27	Rangers	7–3	Gausman (9–8)	Lorenzen (5–6)	—	35,917	48–56	13
105	July 28	Rangers	7–3	Berríos (9–8)	Hernández (3–1)	Pop (1)	40,052	49–56	13
106	July 29 (1)	@ Orioles	5–11	Eflin (6–7)	Rodríguez (1–4)	—	see 2nd game	49–57	14
107	July 29 (2)	@ Orioles	8–4	Francis (4–2)	Povich (1–5)	—	22,272	50–57	13
108	July 30	@ Orioles	2–6	Burnes (11–4)	Bassitt (8–10)	—	21,710	50–58	14
109	July 31	@ Orioles	4–10	Rodriguez (13–4)	Espino (0–1)	—	25,528	50–59	15

August: 17–12 (Home: 8–5; Away: 9–7)

#	Date	Opponent	Score	Win	Loss	Save	Attendance	Record	GB
110	August 2	@ Yankees	8–5	Little (1–1)	Stroman (7–6)	Green (8)	44,883	51–59	13½
111	August 3	@ Yankees	3–8	Rodón (12–7)	Berríos (9–9)	Holmes (23)	40,218	51–60	14½
112	August 4	@ Yankees	3–4 (10)	Leiter Jr. (3–4)	Francis (4–3)	—	44,237	51–61	15½
113	August 6	Orioles	5–2	Bassitt (9–10)	Soto (2–5)	Green (9)	35,051	52–61	15
114	August 7	Orioles	3–7	Smith (3–0)	Burr (0–1)	—	37,547	52–62	15½
115	August 8	Orioles	7–6	Gausman (10–8)	Kremer (4–9)	Green (10)	27,910	53–62	14½
116	August 9	Athletics	3–1	Berríos (10–9)	Spence (7–8)	Green (11)	39,894	54–62	14½
117	August 10	Athletics	0–1	Bido (3–3)	Rodríguez (1–5)	Miller (17)	34,312	54–63	15½
118	August 11	Athletics	4–8	Sears (10–8)	Bassitt (9–11)	—	38,797	54–64	15½
119	August 12	@ Angels	4–2	Francis (5–3)	Daniel (1–4)	Green (12)	29,676	55–64	15
120	August 13	@ Angels	6–1	Gausman (11–8)	Fulmer (0–3)	—	30,982	56–64	14½
121	August 14	@ Angels	9–2	Berríos (11–9)	Anderson (9–11)	—	28,356	57–64	14½
122	August 16	@ Cubs	5–6 (10)	Miller (4–1)	Green (3–3)	—	39,614	57–65	15½
123	August 17	@ Cubs	2–3	Pearson (2–1)	Bassitt (9–12)	López (3)	38,755	57–66	15½
124	August 18	@ Cubs	1–0	Francis (6–3)	Imanaga (9–3)	Green (13)	36,117	58–66	14½
125	August 19	Reds	3–6	Santillan (1–1)	Gausman (11–9)	—	25,603	58–67	15
126	August 20	Reds	10–3	Berríos (12–9)	Spiers (4–5)	—	34,662	59–67	14½
127	August 21	Reds	7–11	Pagán (3–3)	Little (1–2)	—	27,057	59–68	15
128	August 22	Angels	5–3	Yarbrough (5–2)	Burke (1–1)	—	25,900	60–68	15
129	August 23	Angels	5–4	Green (4–3)	Contreras (2–3)	—	25,431	61–68	15
130	August 24	Angels	3–1	Francis (7–3)	Fulmer (0–5)	Green (14)	34,011	62–68	14
131	August 25	Angels	8–2	Gausman (12–9)	Anderson (10–12)	—	37,036	63–68	14
132	August 26 (1)	@ Red Sox	4–1	Pop (1–2)	Pivetta (4–5)	Green (3)	34,756	64–68	13½
133	August 26 (2)	@ Red Sox	7–3	Berríos (13–9)	Keller (0–4)	Little (1)	29,097	65–68	13½
134	August 27	@ Red Sox	3–6	Weissert (3–2)	Rodríguez (1–6)	—	29,634	65–69	13½
135	August 28	@ Red Sox	0–3	Bello (12–6)	Bassitt (9–13)	Jansen (25)	32,809	65–70	13½
136	August 29	@ Red Sox	2–0	Francis (8–3)	Crawford (8–12)	Green (16)	31,712	66–70	13
137	August 30	@ Twins	0–2	López (13–8)	Gausman (12–10)	Durán (19)	24,623	66–71	14
138	August 31	@ Twins	15–0	Berríos (14–9)	Matthews (1–2)	—	30,517	67–71	13

September: 7–17 (Home: 5–9; Away: 2–8)

#	Date	Opponent	Score	Win	Loss	Save	Attendance	Record	GB
139	September 1	@ Twins	3–4	Jax (4–4)	Green (4–4)	Durán (20)	32,774	67–72	13
140	September 3	Phillies	9–10	Kerkering (4–2)	Green (4–5)	Strahm (2)	23,796	67–73	14
141	September 4	Phillies	2–4	Sánchez (10–9)	Francis (8–4)	Estévez (24)	23,768	67–74	14
142	September 6	@ Braves	1–3	Fried (9–8)	Gausman (12–11)	Iglesias (31)	37,230	67–75	15
143	September 7	@ Braves	9–5	Berríos (15–9)	Schwellenbach (5–7)	—	38,276	68–75	14½
144	September 8	@ Braves	3–4 (11)	Iglesias (5–1)	Pop (1–4)	—	36,394	68–76	14½
145	September 9	Mets	2–3	Stanek (7–3)	Nance (0–1)	Díaz (17)	27,470	68–77	15½
146	September 10	Mets	6–2	Bassitt (10–13)	Peterson (9–2)	—	28,109	69–77	14½
147	September 11	Mets	2–6	Young (4–0)	Green (4–6)	Díaz (18)	29,399	69–78	15½
148	September 13	Cardinals	4–3 (11)	Swanson (2–2)	Fernandez (1–5)	—	30,380	70–78	16
149	September 14	Cardinals	7–2	Berríos (16–9)	Gibson (8–7)	—	33,999	71–78	15
150	September 15	Cardinals	3–2	Pop (2–4)	Kittredge (4–5)	Green (17)	34,793	72–78	15
151	September 17	@ Rangers	8–13	Festa (5–1)	Nance (0–2)	—	29,906	72–79	16
152	September 18	@ Rangers	0–2	Bradford (6–3)	Francis (8–5)	Yates (31)	34,625	72–80	17
153	September 19	@ Rangers	4–0	Gausman (13–11)	Rocker (0–1)	—	30,384	73–80	16
154	September 20	@ Rays	0–1	Kelly (4–2)	Berríos (16–10)	Bigge (1)	14,372	73–81	17
155	September 21	@ Rays	2–3	Bradley (7–11)	Rodríguez (1–7)	Rasmussen (1)	20,704	73–82	18
156	September 22	@ Rays	3–4	Kelly (5–2)	Cabrera (3–3)	Uceta (4)	20,567	73–83	19
157	September 23	Red Sox	1–4	Houck (9–10)	Bassitt (10–14)	—	22,254	73–84	19½
158	September 24	Red Sox	5–6 (10)	Martin (3–1)	Nance (0–3)	Shugart (1)	29,178	73–85	19½
159	September 25	Red Sox	6–1	Gausman (14–11)	Fitts (0–1)	—	27,694	74–85	18½
160	September 27	Marlins	5–15	Oller (2–4)	Berríos (16–11)	—	31,597	74–86	19
161	September 28	Marlins	1–8	Curry (2–2)	Rodríguez (1–8)	McCaughan (2)	35,733	74–87	19
162	September 29	Marlins	1–3	Weathers (5–6)	Burr (0–2)	Bender (1)	31,688	74–88	20

== Roster ==
2024 Toronto Blue Jays
Roster
Pitchers: 40 Chris Bassitt; 17 José Berríos; 43 Ryan Burr; 92 Génesis Cabrera; 74 José Cuas; 31 Brett de Geus; 60 Brandon Eisert; 52 Paolo Espino; 44 Bowden Francis; 63 Luis Frías; 93 Yimi García; 34 Kevin Gausman; 57 Chad Green; 16 Yusei Kikuchi; 54 Brendon Little; 62 Easton Lucas; 6 Alek Manoah; 58 Tim Mayza; 45 Tommy Nance; 46 Wes Parsons; 24 Nate Pearson; 56 Zach Pop; 33 Trevor Richards; 52 Nick Robertson; 29 Yariel Rodríguez; 58 Yerry Rodríguez; 68 Jordan Romano; 50 Erik Swanson; 33 Dillon Tate; 45 Mitch White; 35 Ryan Yarbrough	Catchers: 55 Tyler Heineman; 9 Danny Jansen; 30 Alejandro Kirk; 15 Brian Serven; Infielders: 47 Addison Barger; 11 Bo Bichette; 8 Cavan Biggio; 28 Ernie Clement; 20 Luis De Los Santos; 27 Vladimir Guerrero Jr.; 48 Spencer Horwitz; 7 Isiah Kiner-Falefa; 49 Leo Jiménez; 13 Orelvis Martínez; 2 Justin Turner; 7 Will Wagner	Outfielders: 37 Steward Berroa; 8 Jonatan Clase; 39 Kevin Kiermaier; 9 Joey Loperfido; 38 Nathan Lukes; 36 Davis Schneider; 4 George Springer; 25 Daulton Varsho; Other batters: 20 Daniel Vogelbach	Manager: 14 John Schneider; Coaches: 60 Alex Andreopoulos (bullpen catcher); 53 Mark Budzinski (first base); 51 Carlos Febles (third base/infield); 66 Matt Hague (assistant hitting); 10 DeMarlo Hale (associate manager); 85 David Howell (pitching strategist); 19 Dave Hudgens (hitting strategist); 78 Luis Hurtado (bullpen catcher); 22 Gil Kim (field coordinator); -- John Lannan (mental performance coach); 18 Guillermo Martínez (hitting); 23 Don Mattingly (bench coach); 59 Hunter Mense (assistant hitting); 41 Pete Walker (pitching); 21 Jeff Ware (bullpen); 86 Adam Yudelman (coach)

== Statistics ==
= Indicates team leader

=== Batting ===
(Updated as of September 29)

Player	G	AB	R	H	2B	3B	HR	RBI	SB	BB	AVG	Ref.
Addison Barger	69	208	20	41	11	0	7	28	2	14	.197	
Steward Berroa	28	37	7	7	1	0	0	1	6	8	.189	
Bo Bichette	81	311	29	70	16	1	4	31	5	20	.225	
Cavan Biggio	44	110	15	22	4	0	2	9	2	14	.200	
Jonatan Clase	7	20	3	7	1	0	1	2	0	1	.350	
Ernie Clement	139	434	48	114	21	3	12	51	12	11	.263	
Luis De Los Santos	13	29	2	5	2	0	0	1	0	2	.172	
Vladimir Guerrero Jr.	159	616	98	199	44	1	30	103	2	72	.323	
Tyler Heineman	6	10	2	1	0	0	0	0	0	3	.100	
Spencer Horwitz	97	328	46	87	19	0	12	40	0	42	.265	
Danny Jansen	62	198	27	42	13	0	6	18	0	25	.212	
Leo Jiménez	63	179	18	41	11	0	4	19	0	12	.229	
Kevin Kiermaier	82	200	24	39	7	2	4	18	5	10	.195	
Isiah Kiner-Falefa	83	257	32	75	8	2	7	33	3	13	.292	
Alejandro Kirk	103	340	23	86	19	1	5	54	0	35	.253	
Joey Loperfido	43	137	13	27	8	3	2	9	2	6	.197	
Nathan Lukes	22	76	13	23	4	2	1	10	1	10	.303	
Orelvis Martínez	1	3	0	1	0	0	0	0	0	0	.333	
Davis Schneider	135	397	48	76	19	1	13	46	6	47	.191	
Brian Serven	28	63	6	10	4	0	0	3	0	5	.159	
George Springer	145	545	74	120	19	3	19	56	16	60	.220	
Justin Turner	91	301	37	77	17	0	6	31	0	39	.256	
Daulton Varsho	136	459	73	98	21	7	18	58	10	48	.214	
Daniel Vogelbach	31	70	5	13	5	0	1	8	0	9	.186	
Will Wagner	24	82	8	25	6	0	2	11	0	4	.305	
Team totals	162	5410	671	1306	280	26	156	640	72	510	.241	

=== Pitching ===
(Updated as of September 29)

Player	G	GS	W	L	SV	ERA	WHIP	IP	H	R	ER	BB	K	Ref.
Chris Bassitt	31	31	10	14	0	4.16	1.46	171	180	91	79	70	168	
José Berríos	32	32	16	11	0	3.60	1.15	192 1/3	168	79	77	54	153	
Ryan Burr	34	4	0	2	0	4.13	1.26	32 2/3	29	16	15	12	47	
Génesis Cabrera	69	0	3	3	2	3.59	1.47	62 2/3	63	31	25	29	50	
José Cuas	4	0	0	0	0	9.00	2.33	3	3	3	3	4	3	
Brett de Geus	2	0	0	0	0	15.43	2.14	2 1/3	3	4	4	2	1	
Brandon Eisert	3	0	0	0	0	4.05	1.35	6 2/3	5	3	3	4	2	
Paolo Espino	3	1	0	1	0	8.31	2.19	8 2/3	14	8	8	5	3	
Bowden Francis	27	13	8	5	0	3.30	0.93	103 2/3	74	41	38	22	92	
Luis Frías	4	0	0	0	0	21.60	3.30	3 1/3	8	8	8	3	5	
Yimi García	29	0	3	0	5	2.70	0.80	30	16	9	9	8	42	
Kevin Gausman	31	31	14	11	0	3.83	1.22	181	165	86	77	56	162	
Chad Green	53	0	4	6	17	3.21	1.03	53 1/3	41	20	19	14	46	
Yusei Kikuchi	22	22	4	9	0	4.75	1.34	115 2/3	125	63	61	30	130	
Isiah Kiner-Falefa	2	0	0	0	0	4.50	1.50	2	1	1	1	2	0	
Brendon Little	49	0	1	2	1	3.74	1.31	45 2/3	41	21	19	19	36	
Easton Lucas	2	0	0	0	0	11.57	2.14	4 2/3	6	6	6	4	2	
Alek Manoah	5	5	1	2	0	3.70	1.03	24 1/3	17	16	10	8	26	
Tim Mayza	35	0	0	1	0	8.03	1.95	24 2/3	36	24	22	12	16	
Tommy Nance	20	0	0	3	0	4.09	1.23	22	18	12	10	9	19	
Wes Parsons	2	0	0	0	0	10.80	1.60	5	6	6	6	2	2	
Nate Pearson	41	0	0	1	2	5.63	1.55	40	45	26	25	17	51	
Zach Pop	58	0	2	4	1	5.59	1.32	48 1/3	45	36	30	19	33	
Trevor Richards	45	2	2	1	0	4.64	1.15	52 1/3	36	30	27	24	49	
Nick Robertson	1	0	0	0	0	0.00	0.00	1	0	0	0	0	0	
Yariel Rodríguez	21	21	1	8	0	4.47	1.32	86 2/3	74	46	43	40	85	
Yerry Rodríguez	4	0	0	0	0	15.43	2.57	4 2/3	10	9	8	2	5	
Jordan Romano	15	0	1	2	8	6.59	1.46	13 2/3	16	10	10	4	13	
Erik Swanson	45	0	2	2	0	5.03	1.27	39 1/3	36	22	22	14	37	
Dillon Tate	4	0	0	0	0	5.40	2.10	3 1/3	4	2	2	3	4	
Mitch White	4	0	1	0	0	5.40	1.40	10	10	6	6	4	6	
Ryan Yarbrough	12	0	1	0	0	2.01	0.80	31 1/3	18	7	7	7	26	
Team totals	162	162	74	88	36	4.29	1.27	1427 1/3	1316	743	681	503	1314	

== Transactions ==
=== March ===
- On March 28, designated Yosver Zulueta for assignment, selected the contract of Daniel Vogelbach and Brian Serven, placed Danny Jansen on the 10-day injured list, and placed Jordan Romano, Erik Swanson, and Alek Manoah on the 15-day injured list.

=== April ===
- On April 5, designated Wes Parsons for assignment and selected the contract of Paolo Espino.
- On April 7, sent Alek Manoah and Erik Swanson on a rehab assignment to the Low-A Dunedin Blue Jays.
- On April 10, traded Wes Parsons to the Cleveland Guardians for cash considerations, and sent Danny Jansen on a rehab assignment to the Triple-A Buffalo Bisons.
- On April 11, sent Jordan Romano and Erik Swanson on a rehab assignment to the Triple-A Buffalo Bisons.
- On April 13, optioned Paolo Espino, recalled Yariel Rodríguez, and sent Alek Manoah on a rehab assignment to the Triple-A Buffalo Bisons.
- On April 15, optioned Brian Serven and activated Danny Jansen.
- On April 16, designated Mitch White for assignment, optioned Nate Pearson, and activated Jordan Romano and Erik Swanson.
- On April 20, placed Chad Green on the 15-day injured list, recalled Nate Pearson, and traded Mitch White to the San Francisco Giants for cash considerations.
- On April 24, placed Kevin Kiermaier on the 10-day injured list and recalled Addison Barger.

=== July ===
- On July 26, traded Yimi García to the Seattle Mariners in exchange for Jonatan Clase and Jacob Sharp.
- On July 27, traded Danny Jansen to the Boston Red Sox in exchange for minor-leaguers Cutter Coffey, Eddinson Paulino, and Gilberto Batista.
- On July 29, traded Justin Turner to the Seattle Mariners in exchange for RJ Schreck.
- On July 29, traded Yusei Kikuchi to the Houston Astros in exchange for Jake Bloss, Joey Loperfido, and Will Wagner.
- On July 30, traded Trevor Richards to the Minnesota Twins in exchange for minor-leaguer Jay Harry.
- On July 30, traded Isiah Kiner-Falefa and cash to the Pittsburgh Pirates for Charles McAdoo.
- On July 30, traded Kevin Kiermaier to the Los Angeles Dodgers for Ryan Yarbrough.

== Farm system ==
Level	Team	League	Manager	Win–loss record	Division	Postseason	Ref.
Triple-A	Buffalo Bisons	International League	Casey Candaele	37–37 (first half); 31–43 (second half)	East Division	Did not qualify	
Double-A	New Hampshire Fisher Cats	Eastern League	Cesar Martin	30–38 (first half); 22–46 (second half)	Northeast Division	Did not qualify	
High-A	Vancouver Canadians	Northwest League	Brent Lavallee	30–33 (first half); 38–28 (second half)	—N/a	Qualified lost F 3–1	
Low-A	Dunedin Blue Jays	Florida State League	Jose Mayorga	34–32 (first half); 35–29 (second half)	West Division	Did not qualify	
Rookie	FCL Blue Jays	Florida Complex League	Andy Fermin	12–44	North Division	Did not qualify	
Rookie	DSL Blue Jays	Dominican Summer League	Danny Canellas	30–24	Central Division	Did not qualify	
