= Suspended game =

Baseball contest stopped to be resumed at a later date

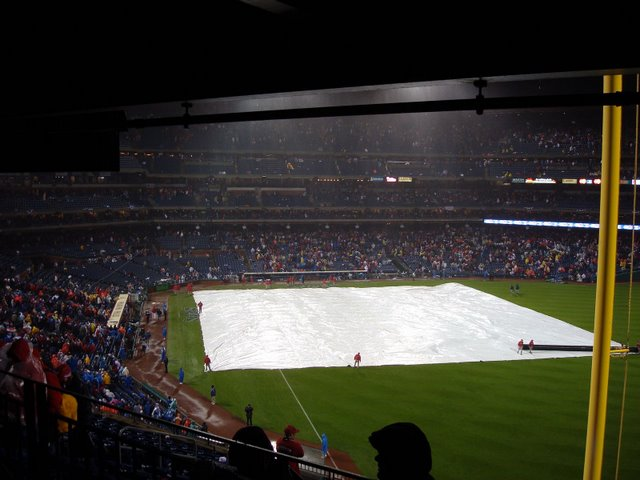
A rain delay in the sixth inning of Game 5 of the 2008 World Series led to the game being suspended; it was completed two days later.

A suspended game in baseball occurs when a game has to be stopped before it can be completed, and the game is meant to be finished at a later time or date. Suspended games are used in Major League Baseball, Minor League Baseball, and may also be used at other levels of play (such as college baseball or the Little League World Series) depending on league or tournament rules.

== Rules ==
Within the Official Baseball Rules of Major League Baseball (MLB), Rule 7.02—"Suspended, Postponed, and Tie Games"—details the circumstances under which a game may be suspended. In general, a game becomes suspended when it is halted by:

- A curfew imposed by law
- A predetermined time limit
- Artificial light failure or other mechanical problems that impact the game
- Darkness, if the lights cannot be turned on as a result of local law
- Inclement weather during an official game (that is, enough innings have been played to yield a result) and an inning is in progress, and during that inning the visiting team has taken the lead (as the home team might still tie the game or retake the lead)
- A regulation game called with the score tied (a game would not end in a tie under current rules, except in the rare event that a game gets called between two teams who are meeting for the last time in the season, with no available date to resume the game, and the outcome of the game has no impact on the postseason)

The rule goes on to describe when a game thus suspended can or must be resumed. Typically, it is to be resumed right before the next scheduled game between the two clubs at the same location. Alternative scenarios are also outlined.

=== Broader use of suspended games ===
Following the 2008 World Series, MLB adopted a change that now requires all postseason games to be played to completion (at least nine innings); situations where inclement weather might otherwise end a game early now result in a postseason game being suspended and resumed. This policy appears as a "Comment" with Rule 7.02(a) in the Official Baseball Rules, and also applied to any potential tie-breaker games at the end of the regular season before they were eliminated in 2022. Prior to the implementation of this rule, postseason games affected by inclement weather were required to have at least five completed innings before being suspended, but could not be shortened if one team was leading after that point; a postseason game stopped prior to that point had to be started over.

For the shortened 2020 season, MLB broadened the use of suspended games for the regular season as well, essentially avoiding situations where a game would need to be restarted from the beginning; this broadened use of suspended games during the regular season was carried over to 2021, and was made a permanent part of the MLB Collective Bargaining Agreement in 2022.

== History ==
The use of suspended games in MLB has changed over time. (Note: Per a historical list of all suspended games in MLB and the reason(s) thereof, it is evident that rules pertaining to the circumstances under which a game could be suspended have changed over time. Comprehensive rule change detail is lacking, although some are known: for example, suspending games on account of darkness at Wrigley Field was first allowed in 1969.) Originally, all games were played to completion, unless they were halted by external conditions such as darkness or weather. Halted games that had not yet progressed to the point of being an official game were replayed (from the beginning) at a later date, regardless of the score. Halted games that had become official games either had a winner declared, or in the case of ties were replayed (also from the beginning) at a later date. (Note: Official games that ended in a tie were counted with regards to individual player statistics, such as hits and earned runs allowed, but were excluded from league standings.) Since World War II, suspended games have been used, for varying reasons depending on league rules of an era, to avoid having to replay games from the beginning.

Prior to World War II, the only instances of suspended games in MLB were games that were successfully protested, and then resumed from the point of protest.

The first instance of a curfew-related suspended game occurred in 1943, and the first instance of a darkness-related suspended game occurred in 1952. Curfew and darkness remained the primary causes of suspended games through the 1970s. Since then, games have rarely been suspended for those reasons: the most recent suspension due to curfew occurred in 1998, and for darkness in 1987. Every instance of a game suspended due to darkness in the 1970s and 1980s occurred at Wrigley Field, which did not have field lighting until 1988.

Since 1990, weather has been the primary cause of suspended games, in situations where an official game is tied at the point that play is halted.

Two of the longest games in professional baseball history were suspended games:

- The longest professional baseball game, a minor league game started on April 18, 1981, was suspended with the score tied after the 32nd inning, at approximately 4 a.m. on April 19. The game was resumed two months later, and ended in the 33rd inning.
- On May 8, 1984, the Chicago White Sox and Milwaukee Brewers played 17 innings at Comiskey Park, then suspended the game due to a league-imposed curfew. The game was completed the next day, with Harold Baines winning the game for Chicago with a home run in the 25th inning.

=== Oddities ===
MLB's Official Baseball Rules allow a player who was not with a team at the point a game was suspended, to be used as a substitute when the game resumes. Additionally, events in a suspended game are considered (with regards to baseball statistics) to have occurred on the original game date. (Note: This is also true for games that last past midnight; all statistics are recorded for the date on which the game started.)

The above can result in a player having statistics from games that pre-date when he joined a team or made his major-league debut. An example of this occurred with first baseman Vince Shupe in 1945. Shupe played in his first major-league game on July 7 with the Boston Braves, and later played in the resumption of a suspended game on August 4. As the suspended game had started on June 17, Shupe has major-league statistics that carry the date of that game, from weeks before he joined the Braves.

These rules have also allowed a player to make appearances for both teams in the same game.

Additionally, the rules could potentially result in what would otherwise be statistically impossible situations for a pitcher, such as being credited with both a loss and a save in the same game, (Note: Example: in a tie game, Pitcher X of the home team walks a batter of the visiting team in the top of the ninth inning, and the game is suspended at that point. Pitcher X is traded from the home team to the visiting team. Upon resumption of the game, the baserunner that Pitcher X allowed, scores the only run of the inning. In the bottom of the ninth inning, Pitcher X (now pitching for the visiting team) retires the side in order. Pitcher X has earned a save as a member of the visiting team, and is charged with the loss as member of the home team.) although this has not occurred in any major-league game.

Lastly, having a game suspended can leave in question—until the game is completed—the status of a player's streak of some kind, such as a hitting streak (offensively) or consecutive games played without committing an error (defensively).

== Notable suspended games ==
A number of suspended games in major league history have been notable due to unusual circumstances or statistical oddities.

=== Pine Tar Incident (1983) ===
An unusual suspended game occurred as a result of the "pine tar incident" on July 24, 1983. George Brett had apparently hit a home run for a 5–4 lead for his Kansas City Royals over the New York Yankees. When the home run was initially disallowed and Brett declared out due to too much pine tar on his bat, this apparently marked the game's final out and ended play with the Yankees apparently winning 4–3. A successful protest to American League president Lee McPhail reinstated the home run and negated the out, but as play had long since ended it became a suspended game. The suspended game was resumed on August 18, 1983, and it was completed uneventfully, with the 5–4 Royals' lead holding up for a win.

=== Pirates–Cubs (1986) ===
On April 20, 1986, the Pittsburgh Pirates and the Chicago Cubs were tied at 8–8 after 13 innings when the umpires suspended the game, being played at Wrigley Field (which still lacked lights), on account of darkness. It was a Sunday game, and the next available slot was August 11. The game went on for four more innings before the Pirates broke through with two runs in the top of the 17th. Barry Bonds came in as a pinch-hitter in the August 11 portion of the game and stayed in the game as the center fielder. Because all statistics of the game are recorded as having occurred on April 20, some sources list that date as Bonds' MLB debut, even though Bonds' actual debut with the Pirates was May 30.

=== Metrodome (2004) ===
An unusual suspended game involving the Minnesota Twins occurred on Saturday and Sunday, October 2 and 3, 2004. The Twins' Saturday game against the Cleveland Indians was suspended due to a time limit required by the Hubert H. Humphrey Metrodome being a shared facility: there was a Minnesota Golden Gophers football game scheduled for that evening. This was not an unusual occurrence during the early part of the college football season at the Metrodome, and usually there was enough time for the baseball game to finish and the field to be prepared for the football game. However, in this case, the game went into extra innings and was suspended with the score tied. It was finished before the start of the Sunday scheduled game.

=== Orioles–White Sox (2008) ===
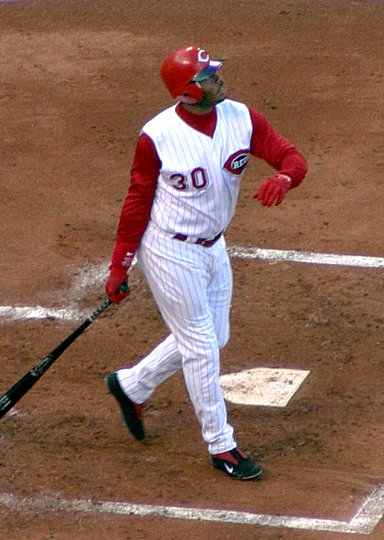
Ken Griffey Jr. is credited with reaching base for two different teams in games played on April 28, 2008.

The game of April 28, 2008, between the Baltimore Orioles and Chicago White Sox, was suspended at the end of the 11th inning, tied 3–3, and not resumed until August 25. This created several statistical oddities: Outfielder Lou Montanez, who was called up to the majors that season on August 5, got a hit in the resumed portion of the game, thus crediting him with his first MLB career hit months before being called up; pitcher Alberto Castillo recorded his first career victory in that game, in spite of not making his MLB debut until July 8; and Ken Griffey Jr., who walked for the White Sox in the resumed portion of the game, had gone 2-for-4 in a National League game played on April 28 while still a member of the Cincinnati Reds, thus statistically reaching base for two different teams on the same day.

=== 2008 World Series ===
On October 27, 2008, in Game 5 of the 2008 World Series between the Philadelphia Phillies and the Tampa Bay Rays, continuing rain forced the Commissioner's office to suspend the game. The break in the action occurred between the top and bottom of the sixth inning, with the score tied at 2–2. This was the first suspended game in the history of the World Series. There had been three tied games previously: 1907, 1912, and 1922. Since 2009, all postseason games that are stopped due to weather are considered suspended regardless of the score or how many innings were played prior to the suspension; the first game to be affected by that rule was Game 1 of the 2011 American League Division Series between the Detroit Tigers and the New York Yankees, which started on September 30, but was suspended after two innings because of rain and was resumed the following evening.

=== Nationals–Astros (2009) ===
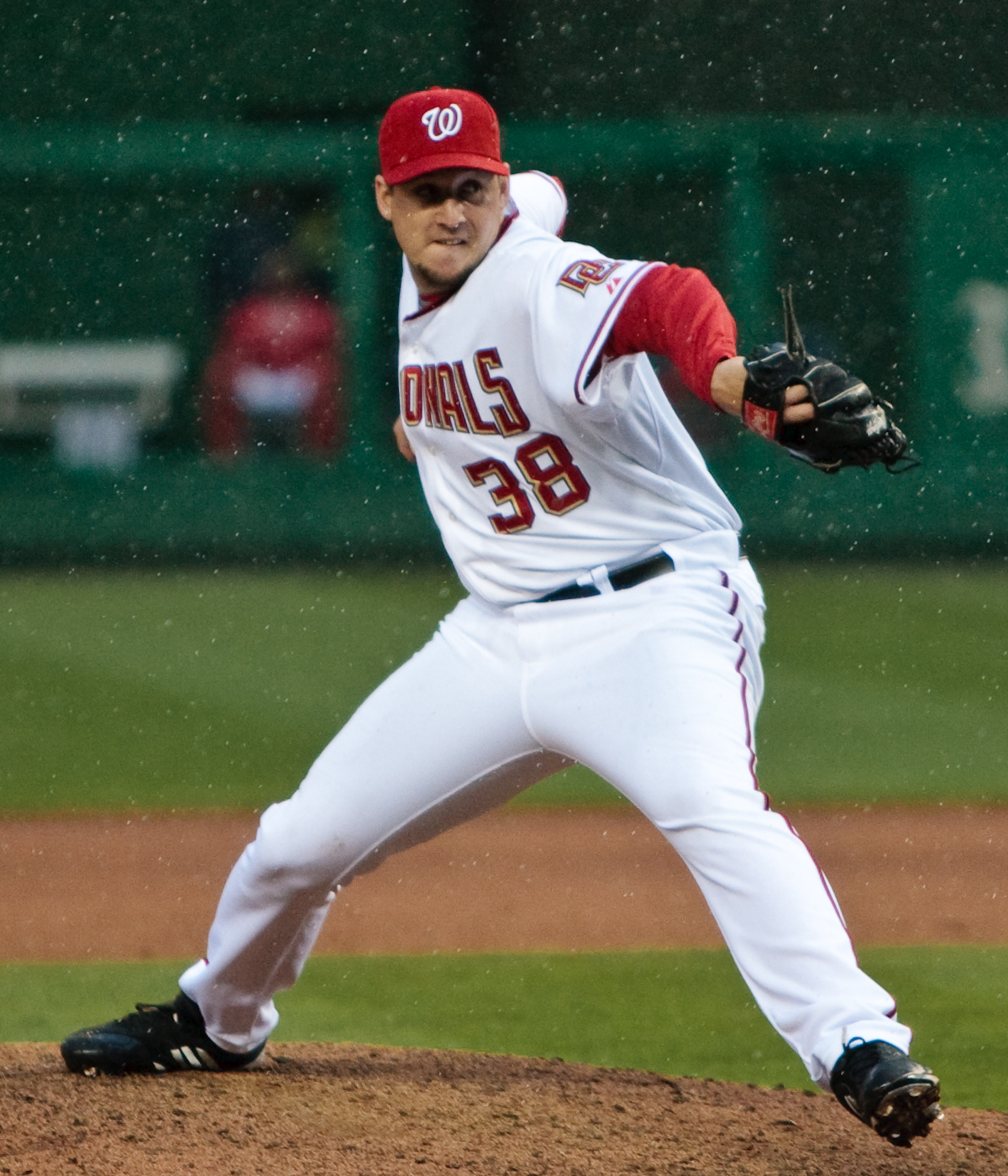
In 2009, Joel Hanrahan had to wait until July 9 to earn the win in a game that he had pitched in on May 5.

A unique situation occurred on July 9, 2009, when the Washington Nationals traveled to Houston to face the Houston Astros in a game that had been suspended on May 5, in the bottom of the 11th inning, in Washington. Joel Hanrahan had pitched the top of the 11th for the Nationals, and in the interim had been traded to the Pittsburgh Pirates for Nyjer Morgan; he remained the pitcher of record and earned the win when Morgan scored (he pinch-ran for Elijah Dukes, who was no longer on the Washington roster) on a throwing error by Miguel Tejada. It was the first walk-off victory for a team in an opposing stadium since 1975.

=== Indians–Royals (2014) ===
On August 31, 2014, the Cleveland Indians were playing the Kansas City Royals at Kauffman Stadium with the score tied, 2–2, at the end of regulation. As inclement weather began to approach, officials attempted to finish the game and were able to complete the top half of the tenth with the Indians taking a two-run advantage, 4–2. But before beginning the bottom, the game was suspended due to the weather. The resumption of the game took place on September 22 at Progressive Field because of scheduling; neither team had an off day that coincided with the other and this was their final series match-up of the season. The Royals scored one run in the inning and lost, 4–3, as the "home" team completing the game in their opponent's ballpark.

=== Yankees–Nationals (2018) ===
On June 18, 2018, the New York Yankees and the Washington Nationals resumed a game suspended by rain on May 15 at Nationals Park with the score tied, 3–3. Nationals rookie Juan Soto pinch hit in the bottom of the 6th inning and hit a two-run homer. Soto's major league debut was on May 20, so officially he hit a home run five days before his debut. Technically, it was also a home run in his first official at-bat, even though he already had five home runs.

=== Athletics–Tigers (2019) ===
On September 6, 2019, the Oakland Athletics and Detroit Tigers completed a suspended game at the Oakland Coliseum. The original game took place on May 19, the finale of the Athletics' only visit to Detroit of the season. The league scheduled the resumption during the Tigers' visit to Oakland in order to avoid having the Athletics make a return trip to Detroit. Due to the long gap, both teams had to replace several players in the game who were no longer on their rosters, including Detroit's Josh Harrison, who was at bat when the original game was suspended but had since been released. Jake Diekman pitched the eighth inning for Oakland; this appearance was recorded to have occurred on May 19, when Diekman was actually a member of the Kansas City Royals and pitched in their game against the Los Angeles Angels. Diekman thus holds a rare distinction of having pitched for two teams (Royals and Athletics) on the same day.

=== Marlins–Mets (2021) ===
A game between the Miami Marlins and New York Mets started on April 11, 2021, at Citi Field in New York was suspended after just nine pitches, due to rain. Historically, such an occurrence would have resulted in the game being restarted from the beginning at a later date; however, as part of a series of pandemic-related rule changes, MLB expanded the use of suspended games in 2020 (the rule was made permanent in 2022) where once the game starts and the game must be suspended, it will continue from the point of interruption. With only one out recorded in the game at the point it was suspended, it set a new major-league record for the earliest point at which a contest was suspended; the prior record had been six outs, occurring during a game between the Kansas City Royals and Milwaukee Brewers at Miller Park on June 15, 2001, due to a lighting failure. The Marlins and Mets completed their suspended game on August 31, with the Mets prevailing, 6–5. The 142 days between suspension and resumption set a record for the largest gap in major-league history, the record previously having been 126 days, for a 1995 game between the Atlanta Braves and Florida Marlins.

=== Padres–Nationals (2021) ===
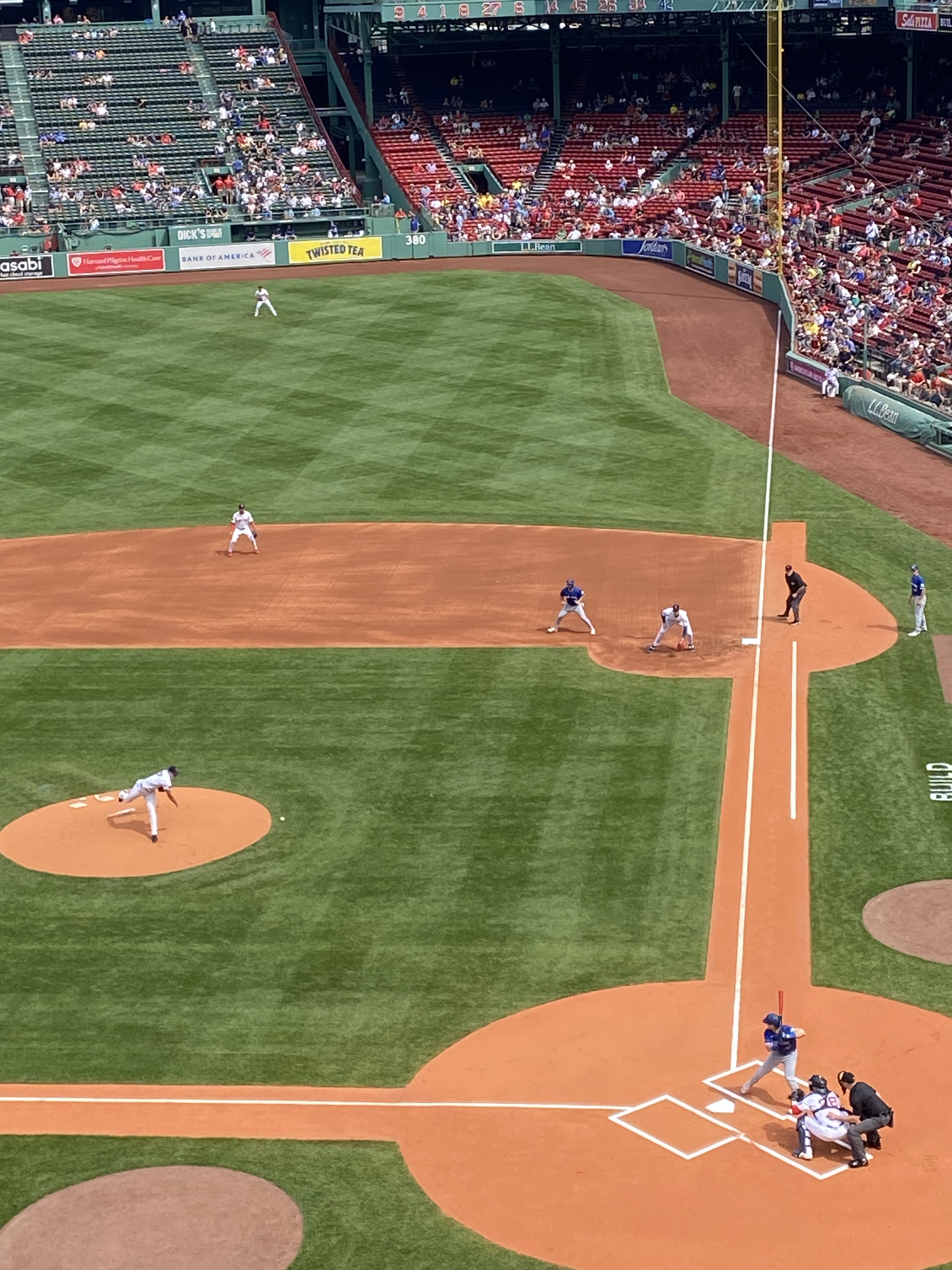
Danny Jansen catching, with Daulton Varsho batting, at Fenway Park during the August 26 resumption of the suspended game of June 26, 2024

A game between the San Diego Padres and Washington Nationals on July 17, 2021, at Nationals Park in Washington, D.C., was suspended after gunshots were heard outside the park. The game was resumed the following day and completed without further incident.

=== Blue Jays–Red Sox (2024) ===
On June 26, the game between the Toronto Blue Jays and Boston Red Sox was suspended in the top of the second inning with one out due to rain. On July 27, catcher Danny Jansen (who was at bat for the Blue Jays when the game was suspended) was traded from the Blue Jays to the Red Sox. Red Sox manager Alex Cora later stated that he intended to use Jansen in the continuation of the suspended game. On August 26, Jansen became the first player in major-league history to play for both teams in the same game, (Note: At least one instance in Minor League Baseball of a player appearing for both teams in the same game is known: Dale Holman, who did so in 1986, also due to being traded between teams involved in a suspended game.) when he entered the resumed game as Boston's catcher, while Daulton Varsho batted in the spot previously occupied by Jansen in Toronto's batting order, and Brian Serven took over at catcher for Toronto. Also in this game, Toronto used players Leo Jiménez and Will Wagner, who made their MLB debuts on July 4 and August 12, respectively—both have official statistics attributed to the date the game started, June 26.

=== Rangers–White Sox (2024) ===
On August 27, the game between the Texas Rangers and Chicago White Sox was suspended in the top of the first inning with no outs, due to rain. With no outs recorded and just four pitches thrown before the game was suspended, this set a new record for both fewest outs recorded and fewest pitches thrown at the point a major-league game was suspended, surpassing the above noted Marlins–Mets (2021) game.

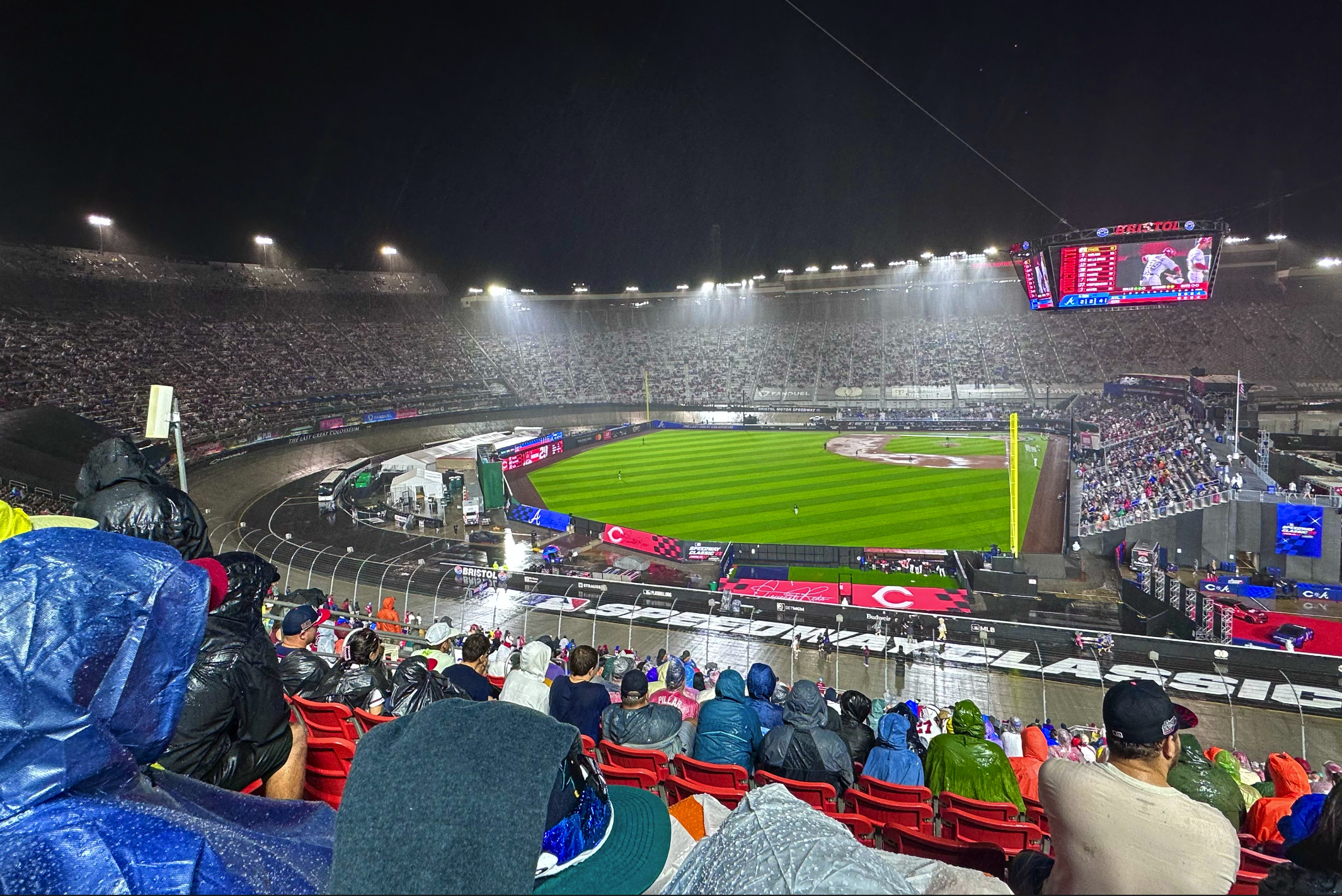
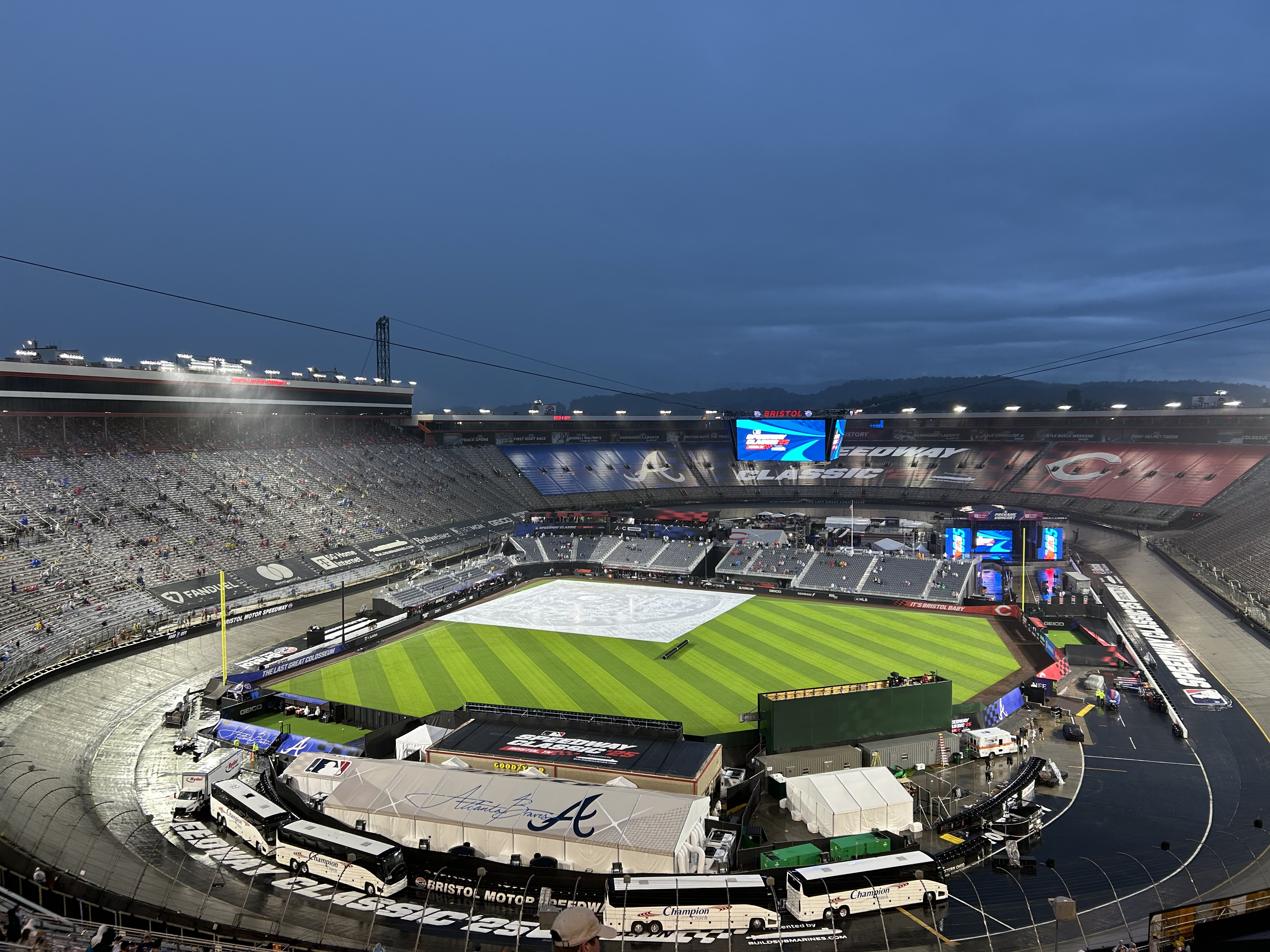
Speedway Classic field soaking wet (left) and covered by a tarp (right)

=== MLB Speedway Classic (2025) ===
On August 2, the MLB Speedway Classic, a game between the Atlanta Braves and Cincinnati Reds contested at the Bristol Motor Speedway, making it the first MLB game played in the state of Tennessee, was suspended by rain in the bottom of the first inning after just four outs were recorded. The game resumed the following afternoon, with the Braves winning by a final score of 4–2.

== In popular culture ==
The main premise of the film Mr. 3000 was caused by a game suspended due to curfew leading to the three hits the protagonist had in the game being errantly double counted.
