= Yariel Rodríguez =

Cuban baseball player (born 1997)

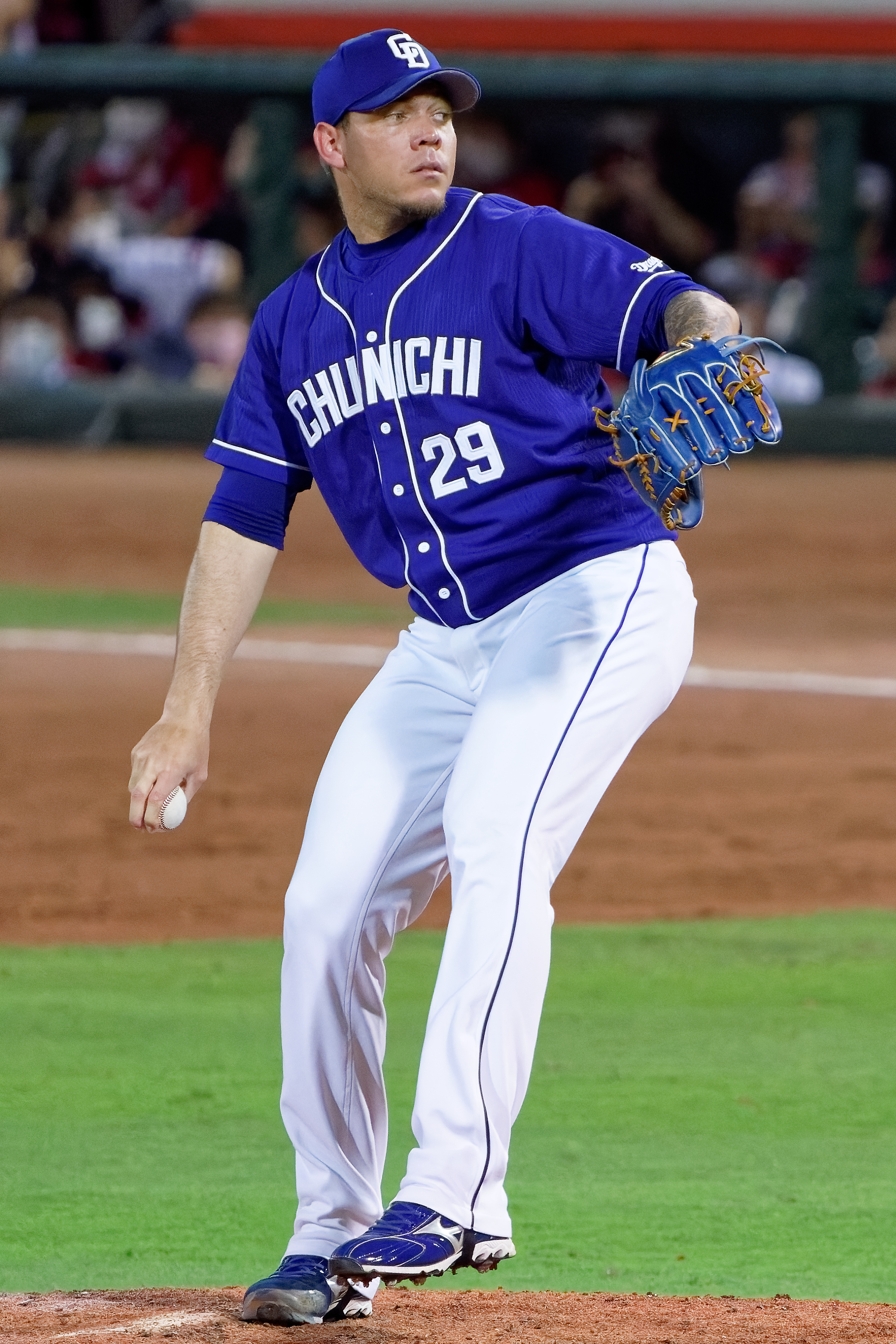
- Rodriguez with the Chunichi Dragons

Toronto Blue Jays
- Pitcher
- Born: March 10, 1997 (age 29); Camagüey, Cuba
- Bats: Right Throws: Right

Professional debut
- NPB: August 9, 2020, for the Chunichi Dragons
- MLB: April 13, 2024, for the Toronto Blue Jays

NPB statistics (through 2022 season)
- Win–loss record: 10–10
- Earned run average: 3.03
- Strikeouts: 188

MLB statistics (through 2026 season)
- Win–loss record: 4–11
- Earned run average: 4.05
- Strikeouts: 157
- Stats at Baseball Reference

Teams
- Chunichi Dragons (2020–2022); Toronto Blue Jays (2024–2026)
Medals
Men's baseball
Representing Cuba
Central American and Caribbean Games
Silver medal – second place	2018 Barranquilla	Team

Yariel Humberto Rodríguez Yordy (born March 10, 1997) is a Cuban professional baseball pitcher in the Toronto Blue Jays organization. He has previously played in Nippon Professional Baseball (NPB) for the Chunichi Dragons. He has also played in the Cuban National Series for Ganaderos de Camagüey and for the Cuba national baseball team in international competitions.

== Professional career ==
=== Chunichi Dragons ===
Rodríguez had previously been linked with the Fukuoka SoftBank Hawks of Nippon Professional Baseball (NPB) before signing with NPB's Chunichi Dragons on a development deal on January 26, 2020. Rodríguez recorded a 3–4 win–loss record and 4.12 earned run average (ERA) in 11 appearances in his first year with Chunichi.

In 2021, Rodríguez made 12 appearances with Chunichi's main team, posting a 1–4 record and 3.65 ERA with 61 strikeouts in 61 2/3 innings pitched. In 2022, he pitched in 56 games for the club, logging a 6–2 record and a 1.15 ERA with 60 strikeouts in 54 2/3 innings of work. He was named the Central League Most Valuable Setup Pitcher following the season.

On January 26, 2023, Rodríguez was selected for the Cuban national team for the fifth World Baseball Classic (WBC) with two players from Chunichi Dragons. In the WBC, Rodríguez started two games, pitching a total of 7.1 innings with 2.45 ERA. After Cuba was eliminated by the United States in the semifinals, Rodríguez returned to Cuba.

On March 28, 2023, Rodríguez unilaterally left the Dragons to seek a contract with a Major League Baseball (MLB) team. The Dragons have declared that the contract with Rodríguez is still valid.

On that same day (March 28, 2023), the Baseball Federation of Cuba (FCB) stated that Rodriguez's contract "ensured up to $10 million in damages, and Rodríguez may not be hired by any other club or third party without the express authorization of the Federation."

On October 5, Rodríguez was officially released by Chunichi, and it was reported that he would look to sign an MLB contract.

=== Toronto Blue Jays ===
On February 9, 2024, Rodríguez signed a five-year, $32 million contract with the Toronto Blue Jays. He was optioned to the Triple–A Buffalo Bisons to begin the regular season. On April 13, Rodríguez was promoted to the major leagues for the first time.

On December 6, 2025, Rodríguez was removed from the 40-man roster and sent outright to Triple-A Buffalo.

Rodríguez was assigned to Triple-A Buffalo to begin the 2026 season. On May 11, 2026, the Blue Jays selected Rodríguez's contract, adding him to their active roster. In 10 appearances for Toronto, he struggled to an 0-1 record and 7.71 ERA with six strikeouts across 9 1/3 innings pitched. On June 8, Rodríguez was designated for assignment by the Blue Jays following Tommy Nance's activation from the injured list. He cleared waivers and was sent outright to Buffalo on June 12.

== Pitching style ==
As a reliever, Rodríguez throws a fastball topping out at 100 miles per hour (161 km/h) and a slider as his two primary pitches.

== International career ==
Rodríguez was part of the Cuba national baseball team at the 2019 WBSC Premier12 tournament. He started the first game of the 2023 World Baseball Classic for Cuba, striking out six and giving up one run in four innings against the Netherlands.
