= Luis De Los Santos (third baseman) =

Dominican baseball player (born 1998)

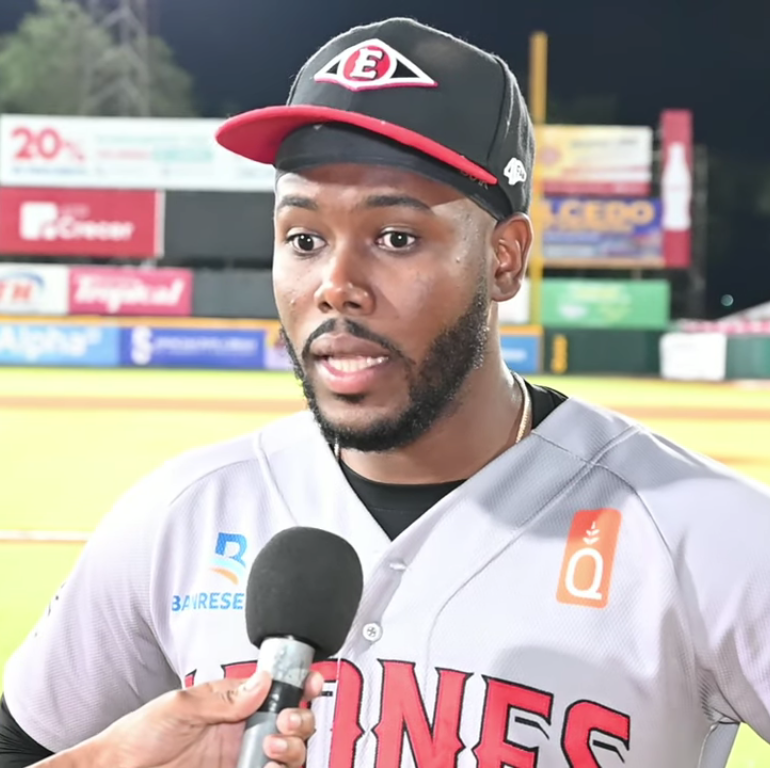
- De Los Santos with the Leones del Escogido in 2024

Leones del Escogido
- Infielder
- Born: June 9, 1998 (age 28); Bajos de Haina, Dominican Republic
- Bats: Right Throws: Right

MLB debut
- July 31, 2024, for the Toronto Blue Jays

MLB statistics (through 2024 season)
- Batting average: .286
- Home runs: 0
- Runs batted in: 1
- Stats at Baseball Reference

Teams
- Toronto Blue Jays (2024)

Luis Alberto De Los Santos (born June 9, 1998) is a Dominican professional baseball infielder for the Tecolotes de los Dos Laredos of the Mexican League. He has previously played in Major League Baseball (MLB) for the Toronto Blue Jays.

== Career ==
=== Toronto Blue Jays ===
On July 2, 2015, De Los Santos signed with the Toronto Blue Jays as an international free agent. He made his professional debut in 2016 with the Dominican Summer League Blue Jays, hitting .291 in 52 games. De Los Santos played 2017 with the rookie-level Gulf Coast League Blue Jays and Lansing Lugnuts, batting .273/.308/.371 with one home run and 29 RBI in 55 total appearances. He spent the 2018 season with the rookie-level Bluefield Blue Jays, slashing .246/.307/.414 with seven home runs, 33 RBI, and nine stolen bases in 62 total contests.

De Los Santos spent 2019 with the Low-A Vancouver Canadians, Single-A Lansing Lugnuts, and High-A Dunedin Blue Jays. In 89 games split between the three affiliates, he batted .213/.258/.301 with three home runs, 24 RBI, and four stolen bases. De Los Santos did not play in a game in 2020 due to the cancellation of the minor league season because of the COVID-19 pandemic. In 2021, he played in 91 games for Vancouver, batting .253/.297/.426 with career-highs in home runs (12) and RBI (65).

De Los Santos split the 2022 season between the Double-A New Hampshire Fisher Cats and Triple-A Buffalo Bisons, hitting .257/.314/.385 with 10 home runs and 57 RBI in 117 combined appearances. He returned to the two affiliates in 2023, playing in 86 games and slashing .230/.332/.384 with eight home runs, 51 RBI, and four stolen bases.

On July 30, 2024, De Los Santos was selected to the 40-man roster and promoted to the major leagues for the first time. On August 11, De Los Santos recorded his first two MLB hits, including an RBI double, in an 8–4 loss to the Oakland Athletics. Having spent nine years in Toronto's system before his debut, De Los Santos was returned to the Buffalo Bisons on August 12 to make room on the roster for Will Wagner. In 13 games for Toronto, he went 5-for-29 (.172) with one RBI and two walks.

=== New York Mets ===
On November 4, 2024, De Los Santos was claimed off waivers by the New York Mets. He was designated for assignment by the Mets on January 31, 2025. De Los Santos cleared waivers and was sent outright to the Triple-A Syracuse Mets on February 5. He made 105 appearances for Syracuse, slashing .242/.287/.340 with eight home runs and 42 RBI. De Los Santos elected free agency following the season on November 6.

=== Tecolotes de los Dos Laredos ===
On April 14, 2026, De Los Santos signed with the Tecolotes de los Dos Laredos of the Mexican League.
