= Jesús Sánchez (outfielder) =

Dominican baseball player (born 1997)

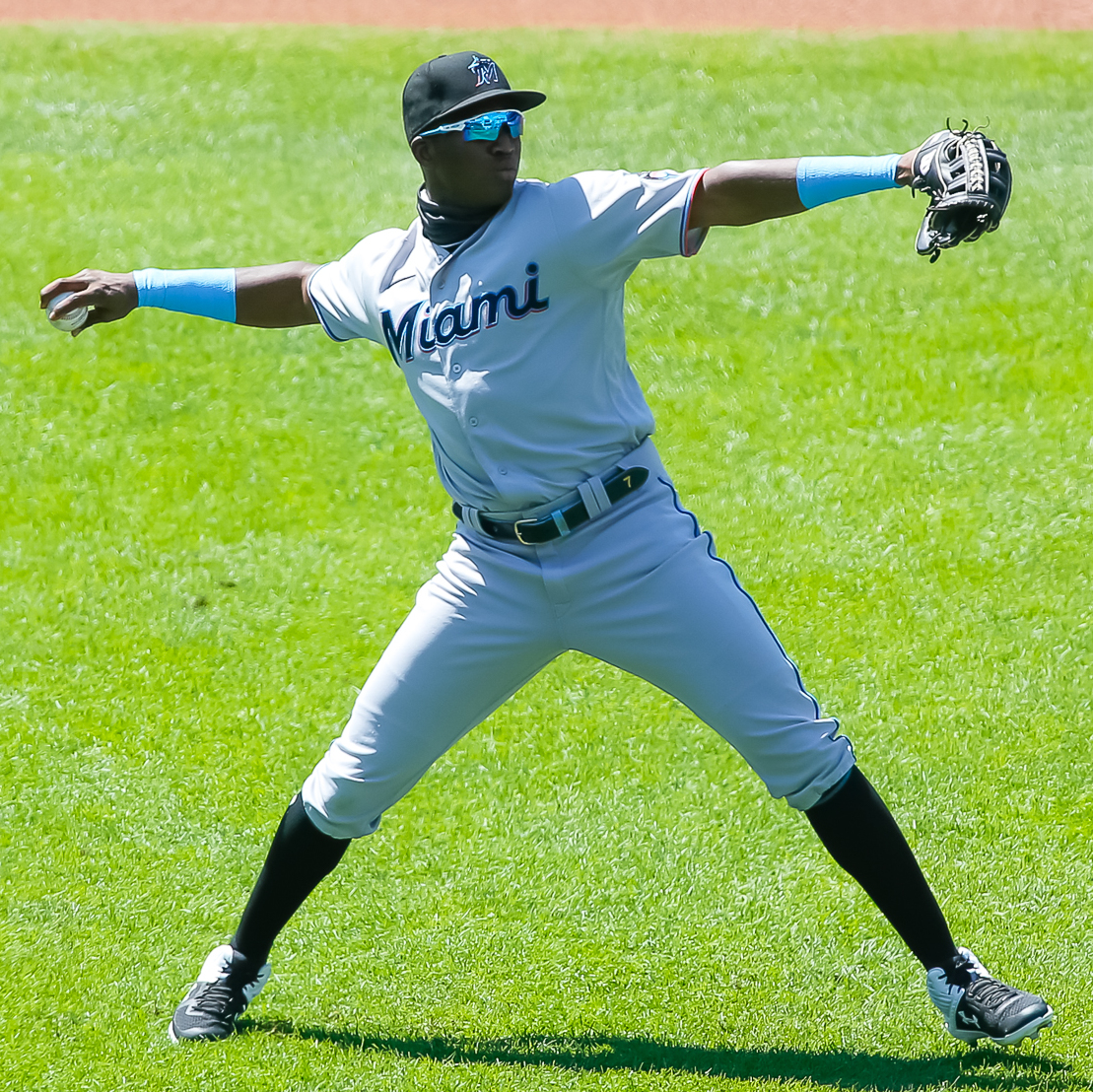
- Sánchez with the Miami Marlins in 2020

Free agent
- Outfielder
- Born: October 7, 1997 (age 29); Higüey, Dominican Republic
- Bats: Left Throws: Right

MLB debut
- August 21, 2020, for the Miami Marlins

MLB statistics (through 2026 season)
- Batting average: .241
- Home runs: 81
- Runs batted in: 273
- Stats at Baseball Reference

Teams
- Miami Marlins (2020–2025); Houston Astros (2025); Toronto Blue Jays (2026); Arizona Diamondbacks (2026)

Jesús Enrique Sánchez (born October 7, 1997) is a Dominican professional baseball outfielder who is a free agent. He has previously played in MLB for the Miami Marlins, Houston Astros, Toronto Blue Jays, and Arizona Diamondbacks. Sánchez signed with the Tampa Bay Rays as an international free agent in 2014, and made his MLB debut in 2020 with the Marlins.

== Career ==
=== Tampa Bay Rays ===
Sánchez signed with the Tampa Bay Rays as an international free agent in June 2014 for a $400,000 signing bonus. He made his professional debut in 2015 with the Dominican Summer League Rays and spent the whole season there, slashing .335/.382/.498 with four home runs and 45 RBI in 61 games. Sánchez played 2016 with the Gulf Coast League Rays and Princeton Rays, compiling a combined .329 batting average with seven home runs, 39 RBI, and a .900 OPS in 56 total games between the two affiliates, and 2017 with the Bowling Green Hot Rods where he batted .305 with 15 home runs and 82 RBI in 117 games.

Sánchez began 2018 with the Charlotte Stone Crabs. He was named to the 2018 MLB Futures Game and played for the World team. Sánchez was also named the Stone Crabs MVP for the 2018 season after batting .301/.331/.462 with ten home runs and 64 RBI across 90 appearances. He also played in 27 games for the Montgomery Biscuits at the end of the year, hitting .214.

The Rays added Sánchez to their 40–man roster after the 2018 season, in order to protect him from the Rule 5 draft. He began 2019 with Montgomery and was promoted to the Triple–A Durham Bulls in July.

=== Miami Marlins ===
On July 31, 2019, Sánchez and Ryne Stanek were traded to the Miami Marlins in exchange for Nick Anderson and Trevor Richards. He made 17 appearances for the Triple-A New Orleans Baby Cakes, batting .246/.338/.446 with four home runs and nine RBI.

On August 20, 2020, Sánchez was promoted to the major leagues. He made his major league debut the next day as the starting right fielder against the Washington Nationals. Sánchez made 10 appearances for Miami during his rookie campaign, going 1-for-25 (.040) with two RBI and four walks. He made 64 appearances for the Marlins during the 2021 season, slashing .251/.319/.489 with 14 home runs and 36 RBI.

On May 30, 2022, Sánchez hit a 496-foot home run off of Ryan Feltner of the Colorado Rockies at Coors Field, the longest home run since Nomar Mazara in 2019. It was also one of the 5 longest home runs since the Statcast era began in 2015. Sánchez made 98 appearances for the Marlins during the regular season, batting .214/.280/.403 with 13 home runs and 36 RBI.

Sánchez played in 125 games for the Marlins during the 2023 season, batting .253/.327/.450 with 14 home runs and 52 RBI. He made 149 appearances for Miami in 2024, slashing .252/.313/.417 with career-highs in home runs (18), RBI (64), and stolen bases (16). Sánchez played in 48 games for the Marlins in 2025, hitting .256/.320/.420 with 10 home runs, 36 RBI, and nine stolen bases.

=== Houston Astros ===
On July 31, 2025, the Marlins traded Sánchez to the Houston Astros in exchange for Ryan Gusto, Chase Jaworsky, and Esmil Valencia. Sánchez made 48 appearances down the stretch for the Astros, batting .199/.269/.342 with four home runs, 12 RBI, and four stolen bases.

=== Toronto Blue Jays ===
On February 13, 2026, the Astros traded Sánchez to the Toronto Blue Jays in exchange for Joey Loperfido. He made 99 appearances for the Blue Jays, slashing .260/.318/.416 with eight home runs and 35 RBI. On September 11, Sánchez was designated for assignment by Toronto.

=== Arizona Diamondbacks ===
On September 14, 2026, Sánchez was claimed off of waivers by the Arizona Diamondbacks. He was designated for assignment on September 26. On September 29, he cleared waivers and was sent outright to Triple-A Reno Aces. He elected free agency on November 2.

== Personal life ==
Sanchez is Dominican with Haitian origins and had expressed interest in joining a Haitian national baseball team if ever assembled.
