= Jake Bloss =

American baseball player (born 2001)

Toronto Blue Jays – No. 28
- Pitcher
- Born: June 23, 2001 (age 25); Greensboro, North Carolina, U.S.
- Bats: Right Throws: Right

MLB debut
- June 21, 2024, for the Houston Astros

MLB statistics (through 2024 season)
- Win–loss record: 0–1
- Earned run average: 6.94
- Strikeouts: 11
- Stats at Baseball Reference

Teams
- Houston Astros (2024)

John "Jake" Bloss (born June 23, 2001) is an American professional baseball pitcher for the Toronto Blue Jays of Major League Baseball (MLB). He made his MLB debut in 2024 with the Houston Astros.

== Career ==
Bloss attended The Early College at Guilford (ECG) in Greensboro, North Carolina. He played baseball for Grimsley High School, however, because ECG did not have a baseball team. In his senior year playing for Grimsley he was the player of the year for the Metro Conference and a North Carolina coaches association All-State selection [4A All-State-Teams-NCBCA-2019.pdf @ncbca.org]. He played college baseball in the Patriot League at Lafayette College from which he graduated in three years with a degree in math and economics. In his 2022 senior year he pitched a complete game shut out and struck out 68 in 58 innings pitched, earning a first team All-Patriot League selection. . With another year of eligibility remaining, he enrolled in the masters of finance program at Georgetown University and joined its baseball team to compete in the 2023 Big East Conference season. Bloss finished his season with a 2.58 ERA and 96 strikeouts (against 24 walks) in 76.2 innings pitched; he was a unanimous first team all-conference selection and earned Big East Conference pitcher of the year honors for his only season at Georgetown. He was also elected to two All-American teams.

=== Houston Astros ===
Bloss was selected by the Houston Astros in the third round of the 2023 Major League Baseball draft. He was the highest selected draft pick in Georgetown history.

Bloss spent his first professional season with the rookie-level Florida Complex League Astros and Fayetteville Woodpeckers, accumulating a 2.89 ERA in 7 games. He started 2024 with the Asheville Tourists before being promoted to the Corpus Christi Hooks. In 12 starts between the two affiliates, Bloss compiled a 1.74 ERA with 60 strikeouts and pitched the first 6.1 innings of a combined no-hit, no-run win for the Hooks over the Missions in San Antonio on June 15, the first no-hitter in the history of the Hooks.

On June 20, 2024, the Astros announced that they would be promoting Bloss to the majors for the first time to make his MLB debut the next day. He was officially selected to the 40-man and active rosters the following day. In his debut against the Baltimore Orioles, Bloss allowed two runs on six hits with two strikeouts across 3 2/3 innings in the Astros win over Orioles. He was placed on the injured list the next day with right shoulder discomfort. After a rehab start at Triple-A Sugar Land, in which he gave up no runs on one hit and struck out three in 4 innings pitched, Bloss returned for two more Astros starts, a win over the Marlins, in which he struck out four in 4 innings pitched, and a loss in Oakland against the Athletics.

=== Toronto Blue Jays ===
On July 29, 2024, Bloss, Joey Loperfido, and Will Wagner were traded to the Toronto Blue Jays in exchange for pitcher Yusei Kikuchi. He made 8 starts down the stretch for the Triple-A Buffalo Bisons, struggling to an 0–4 record and 6.91 ERA with 25 strikeouts across 27 1/3 innings pitched.

For the second annual MLB Spring Breakout games for top prospects in March 2025, the Blue Jays selected Bloss to start their game against the Twins. He struck out four of the six hitters he faced and retired in two innings pitched, earning All Spring Breakout First Team honors.[10] Bloss was optioned to Triple-A Buffalo to begin the 2025 regular season. On May 13, 2025, it was announced that Bloss would require surgery to repair his ulnar collateral ligament; he was subsequently ruled out for the remainder of the year, as well as part of the 2026 campaign.

Bloss was optioned to Triple-A Buffalo ahead of the 2026 season as he continued to recover from surgery.
