= Joey Loperfido =

American baseball player (born 1999)

Houston Astros
- Outfielder
- Born: May 11, 1999 (age 27); Philadelphia, Pennsylvania, U.S.
- Bats: Left Throws: Right

MLB debut
- April 30, 2024, for the Houston Astros

MLB statistics (through 2026 season)
- Batting average: .240
- Home runs: 9
- Runs batted in: 51
- Stats at Baseball Reference

Teams
- Houston Astros (2024); Toronto Blue Jays (2024–2025); Houston Astros (2026)

Mario Joseph Loperfido (born May 11, 1999) is an American professional baseball outfielder in the Houston Astros organization. He has previously played in Major League Baseball (MLB) for the Toronto Blue Jays. He made his MLB debut in 2024.

== Career ==
=== Amateur ===
Loperfido attended Haddonfield Memorial High School in Haddonfield, New Jersey, and played college baseball at Duke University. In 2018, he played collegiate summer baseball with the Kalamazoo Growlers of the Northwoods League, and in 2019 with the Cotuit Kettleers of the Cape Cod Baseball League.

=== Houston Astros ===
The Houston Astros selected Loperfido in the seventh round of the 2021 Major League Baseball draft. He made his professional debut in 2021 with the Single–A Fayetteville Woodpeckers and spent 2022 with Fayetteville and High–A Asheville Tourists. He started 2023 with Asheville, and was promoted to the Double–A Corpus Christi Hooks after eight games. Loperfido began the 2024 season with the Triple–A Sugar Land Space Cowboys. In 25 games, he hit .287/.393/.713 with 13 home runs, 27 RBI, and five stolen bases.

On April 30, 2024, Loperfido was selected to the 40-man roster and promoted to the major leagues for the first time. In his debut, he hit a two RBI single against Cleveland Guardians pitcher Carlos Carrasco. He hit his first career home run on May 16, against the Oakland Athletics. On May 27, Loperfido was demoted to Sugar Land to make room on the roster for José Abreu. On June 14, Abreu was released, and Loperfido returned to the Major League team a week later. In 38 total games for Houston, he slashed .236/.299/.359 with two home runs, 16 RBI, and two stolen bases.

=== Toronto Blue Jays ===
On July 29, 2024, Loperfido, Jake Bloss, and Will Wagner were traded to the Toronto Blue Jays in exchange for pitcher Yusei Kikuchi. With Toronto in 2024, he batted .197/.236/.343 with two home runs, nine RBI, six walks, and 52 strikeouts in 144 plate appearances over 43 games.

Loperfido was optioned to the Triple-A Buffalo Bisons to begin the 2025 season. On July 6, 2025, Loperfido was called up to the majors when Andres Gimenez was placed on the 10-day injured list with an ankle sprain. He was optioned back to the Bisons on August 16. Loperfido made 41 total appearances for the Blue Jays during the regular season, batting .333/.379/.500 with four home runs, 14 RBI, and one stolen base. Loperfido replaced Anthony Santander on the 2025 American League Championship Series roster.

=== Houston Astros (second stint) ===
On February 13, 2026, the Blue Jays traded Loperfido back to the Houston Astros in exchange for Jesús Sánchez. Loperfido appeared in 40 games for Houston in 2026, batting .214/.311/.330 with one home run, 12 RBI, seven doubles, 14 walks, and 32 strikeouts. He played 29 games in left field, six in center, and four in right. Following the season, Loperfido underwent surgery to repair the right hip labrum and an impingement and was projected to not be ready for spring training. On November 17, Loperfido was removed from the 40–man roster and placed on outright waivers.
