= Orelvis Martínez =

Dominican baseball player (born 2001)

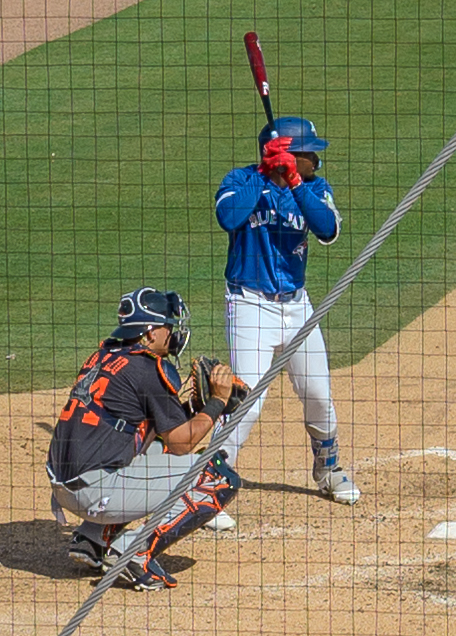
- Martínez during spring training in 2025

Free agent
- Infielder
- Born: November 19, 2001 (age 24); Santo Domingo, Dominican Republic
- Bats: Right Throws: Right

MLB debut
- June 21, 2024, for the Toronto Blue Jays

MLB statistics (through 2024 season)
- Batting average: .333
- Home runs: 0
- Runs batted in: 0
- Stats at Baseball Reference

Teams
- Toronto Blue Jays (2024)

Orelvis Miguel Martínez (born November 19, 2001) is a Dominican professional baseball infielder who is a free agent. He has previously played in Major League Baseball (MLB) for the Toronto Blue Jays, appearing in one game in 2024 as a second baseman.

== Career ==
=== Toronto Blue Jays ===
Martínez signed with the Toronto Blue Jays organization as an international free agent on July 2, 2018. His $3.5 million signing bonus is the second-highest signing bonus given to an international free agent in team history, just behind the $3.9 million bonus given to Vladimir Guerrero Jr. in 2015. Martínez joined the Blue Jays' fall instructional camp along with Jordan Groshans and Cal Stevenson following the international signing.

Martínez was assigned to the Rookie-level Gulf Coast League Blue Jays for the 2019 season. He appeared in 40 games and recorded a .275 batting average, a team-leading seven home runs, and 32 runs batted in (RBI). Martínez did not play in a game in 2020 due to the cancellation of the minor league season because of the COVID-19 pandemic.

Entering the 2021 season, Martínez was ranked sixth in the Blue Jays system. Martínez was optioned to the Single–A Dunedin Blue Jays to begin the season, batting a .279 batting average, 19 home runs, and 68 runs batted in, before being assigned to the High-A Vancouver Canadians on August 3, 2021. He finished the season with the Canadians batting a .214 batting average, 9 home runs and 19 runs batted in.

Martínez began the 2022 season with the Double–A New Hampshire Fisher Cats. On August 21, Martínez broke the franchise record for most home runs in a single season by a player, breaking the record of 27 set by Chip Cannon in 2006. Martínez finished the season with New Hampshire, batting with a .203 batting average, 30 home runs, and 76 runs batted in. On November 15, the Blue Jays added Martínez to their 40-man roster to protect him from the Rule 5 draft.

Martínez began the 2023 season again in New Hampshire. On July 17, 2023, Martínez was promoted to the Triple–A Buffalo Bisons. In his second Triple–A at-bat, he hit a home run to put the Bisons up 7–2. In 125 games split between Buffalo and the Double–A New Hampshire Fisher Cats, he batted .243 with 28 home runs and 94 runs batted in.

Entering the 2024 season, Martínez was ranked second on Major League Baseball's 2024 Top 30 Blue Jays prospects list, and 87th overall on the 2024 Top 100 MLB prospects list. He was optioned to Triple–A Buffalo to begin the 2024 season. He began the season with a 15-game hit streak with the Bisons. On June 18, Martínez was promoted to the major leagues for the first time following an injury to Bo Bichette. In his debut on June 21 against the Cleveland Guardians, he went 1-for-3 with a single off of Carlos Carrasco. On June 23, Martínez was suspended 80 games after testing positive for the performance–enhancing substance clomiphene, which he said in a statement that he had taken for fertility issues as he and his girlfriend are trying to have children. He was activated from the restricted list on September 24, and subsequently optioned to Buffalo. In 74 games with the Bisons, Martínez batted .267 with 17 home runs and 49 runs batted in. Following the end of the Bisons season, the Blue Jays sent Martínez to Tigres del Licey in the Dominican Winter League.

Martínez was optioned to Triple-A Buffalo to begin the 2025 season. After hitting .176/.288/.348 with 13 home runs in 99 games for Buffalo, Martínez was designated for assignment by the Blue Jays on September 11. The Blue Jays released Martínez on September 15.

=== Washington Nationals ===
On September 26, 2025, Martínez signed with the Washington Nationals on a minor league contract that runs through the 2026 season. However, Martínez was released by Washington prior to the start of the regular season on March 21, 2026.
