= Bowden Francis =

American baseball player (born 1996)

Toronto Blue Jays – No. 44
- Pitcher
- Born: April 22, 1996 (age 30); Tallahassee, Florida, U.S.
- Bats: Right Throws: Right

MLB debut
- April 27, 2022, for the Toronto Blue Jays

MLB statistics (through 2025 season)
- Win–loss record: 11–13
- Earned run average: 3.87
- Strikeouts: 182
- Stats at Baseball Reference

Teams
- Toronto Blue Jays (2022–2025)

Robert Bowden Francis (/ˈbaʊdɛn/ BOW-den; born April 22, 1996) is an American professional baseball pitcher for the Toronto Blue Jays of Major League Baseball (MLB). He was selected by the Milwaukee Brewers in the seventh round of the 2017 MLB draft. He made his MLB debut in 2022 with the Blue Jays.

== Early life ==
Francis was born in Tallahassee, Florida. He attended Chipola College in Marianna, Florida, and was drafted by the Milwaukee Brewers in the seventh round of the 2017 Major League Baseball draft.

== Professional career ==
=== Milwaukee Brewers ===
Francis made his professional debut with the Arizona League Brewers, pitching to a 8.10 earned run average (ERA) in four games. Francis split the 2018 season between the Class–A Wisconsin Timber Rattlers and the Advanced–A Carolina Mudcats, posting a 7–10 win–loss record, 4.50 ERA, and 106 strikeouts in 128 innings pitched. The following season, Francis split the year between Carolina and the Double–A Biloxi Shuckers, and posted an 8–9 record, 3.97 ERA, and 165 strikeouts in 142 2/3 innings of work. Francis did not play in a game in 2020 due to the COVID-19 pandemic's cancellation of the minor league season. Francis began the 2021 season with Biloxi before being promoted to the Triple–A Nashville Sounds at the end of May. In 11 games between the two levels, Francis logged a 7–3 record and 3.62 ERA with 65 strikeouts in 59 2/3 innings pitched.

=== Toronto Blue Jays ===
On July 6, 2021, Francis was traded to the Toronto Blue Jays along with Trevor Richards in exchange for Rowdy Tellez. He was assigned to the Triple-A Buffalo Bisons and remained with the team for the rest of the minor league season. In 73 innings for the Bisons, Francis went 6–4 with a 4.19 ERA and 71 strikeouts. Francis was added to the 40-man roster following the season on November 19.

On April 25, 2022, Francis was called up by the Blue Jays. He made only one appearance against the Boston Red Sox, tossing a scoreless 2/3 inning with one strikeout. On June 18, Francis was removed from the 40–man roster and sent outright to Triple-A.

He began the 2023 season with Triple-A Buffalo, making four starts and recording a 3.45 ERA with 23 strikeouts in 15 2/3 innings pitched. On June 6, 2023, Francis had his contract selected to the major league roster. In 20 relief outings for Toronto, he recorded a 1.73 ERA with 35 strikeouts across 36 1/3 innings pitched.

Entering the 2024 season, the Blue Jays announced that Francis would be part of their season–opening rotation. On August 24, 2024, Francis threw 8 no-hit innings against the Los Angeles Angels before Taylor Ward hit a leadoff home run in the top of the ninth to break it up. This was the first time a Blue Jay threw 8 no-hit innings since Brandon Morrow went 8 2/3 against the Tampa Bay Rays in 2010 and would have been the second no-hitter in Blue Jays history following Dave Stieb in 1990 against the Cleveland Indians. After following this performance with seven innings of one-hit ball against the Boston Red Sox on August 29, Francis was named the American League Pitcher of the Month, becoming the second Jays pitcher to win the award in 2024 after Jose Berrios. On September 11, Francis again threw 8 no-hit innings at home, this time against the New York Mets, only for Francisco Lindor to hit a game-tying leadoff home run, and the Mets to win 6–2. Francis became the second pitcher in Blue Jays history to have multiple no-hit bids of 8 innings, following Stieb, and the first pitcher in the Expansion Era (since 1961) to have multiple no-hit bids of 8 innings within his first 11 career starts. He also became the first pitcher to lose multiple no-hit bids in the 9th inning in a season since Nolan Ryan in 1989.

Francis made 14 starts for Toronto to begin the 2025 season, struggling to a 2-8 record and 6.05 ERA with 54 strikeouts over 64 innings of work. On June 17, 2025, Francis was placed on the injured list due to a right shoulder impingement; he was transferred to the 60-day injured list on July 28.

On February 10, 2026, it was announced that Francis would require Tommy John surgery, ending his season prematurely.

== Personal life ==
Francis was named for Bobby Bowden.

Francis's mother died from breast cancer in 2014. Francis's younger brother, Harrison, was selected by the Arizona Diamondbacks in the fourth round of the 2017 Major League Baseball draft.
