= Leo Jiménez =

Panamanian baseball player (born 2001)

Free agent
- Shortstop / Second baseman
- Born: May 17, 2001 (age 25); Chitré, Panama
- Bats: Right Throws: Right

MLB debut
- July 4, 2024 (Note: Jiménez made his MLB debut on July 4, 2024. On August 26, 2024, he appeared in the resumption of a suspended game that had begun on June 26, 2024. As all MLB statistics are recorded on the date that a game started, Jiménez has MLB statistics with a June 26 date.), for the Toronto Blue Jays

MLB statistics (through 2026 season)
- Batting average: .203
- Home runs: 7
- Runs batted in: 34
- Stats at Baseball Reference

Teams
- Toronto Blue Jays (2024–2025); Miami Marlins (2026)

Leonardo Joel Jiménez (born May 17, 2001) is a Panamanian professional baseball shortstop who is a free agent. He has previously played in Major League Baseball (MLB) for the Toronto Blue Jays and Miami Marlins.

== Career ==
=== Toronto Blue Jays ===
Jiménez signed with the Toronto Blue Jays as an international free agent on July 2, 2017, receiving a $800,000 signing bonus. He began his minor league career in 2018 with the Rookie-level Gulf Coast League Blue Jays, hitting .250 in 37 games. He spent 2019 almost exclusively with the Rookie Advanced Bluefield Blue Jays, hitting .298 in 56 games.

Jimenez did not play in game in 2020 due to the cancellation of the minor league season because of the COVID-19 pandemic. In 2021, he spent most of the year with the Single–A Dunedin Blue Jays, playing in 54 games and batting .316/.517/.381 with one home run and 19 RBI. On November 19, 2021, Toronto added Jimenez to their 40-man roster to protect him from the Rule 5 draft.

In 2022, he started the season with the High-A Vancouver Canadians. Jiménez was optioned to the Double-A New Hampshire Fisher Cats to begin the 2023 season. In 94 games split between New Hampshire and the Triple–A Buffalo Bisons, he batted .270/.366/.401 with 8 home runs, 47 RBI, and 8 stolen bases. Jiménez was optioned to Triple–A Buffalo to begin the 2024 season.

On July 2, 2024, Jiménez was promoted to the major leagues for the first time following an injury to Isiah Kiner-Falefa. He made his major league debut two days later, starting at shortstop against the Houston Astros. In 63 appearances for the Blue Jays during his rookie campaign, Jiménez slashed .229/.329/.358 with four home runs and 19 RBI.

Jiménez was optioned to Triple-A Buffalo to begin the 2025 season. He made 18 appearances for Toronto during the regular season, batting .069/.129/.172 with one home run and one RBI.

On March 25, 2026, Jiménez was designated for assignment by the Blue Jays after failing to make the team's Opening Day roster.

=== Miami Marlins ===
On March 29, 2026, Jiménez was traded to the Miami Marlins in exchange for Dub Gleed. He made 66 appearances for Miami, slashing .199/.306/.259 with two home runs, 14 RBI, and one stolen base. Jiménez was designated for assignment by the Marlins on September 3. He was released by Miami on September 5.
