= Trevor Richards (baseball) =

American baseball player (born 1993)

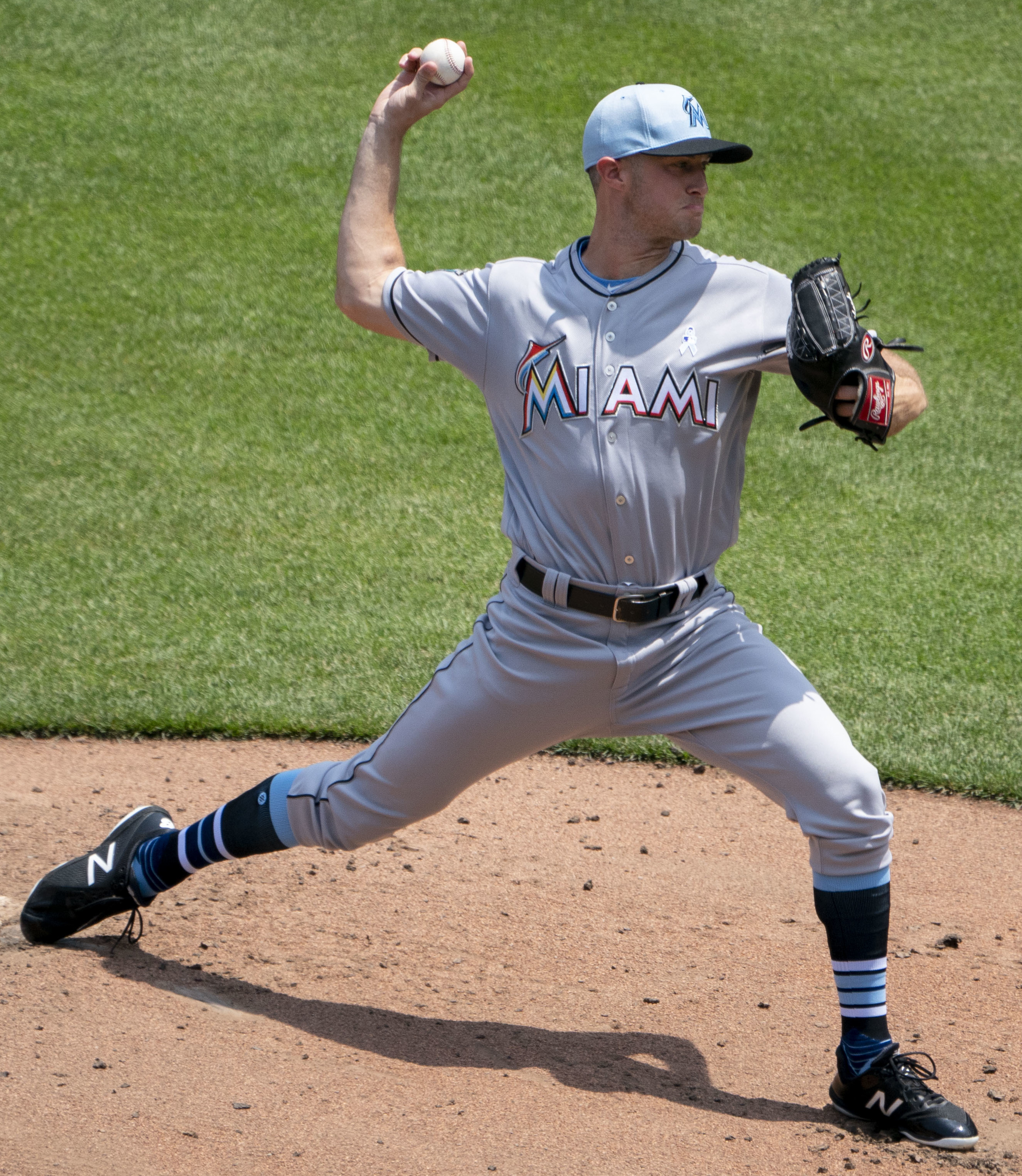
- Richards with the Miami Marlins in 2018

Free agent
- Pitcher
- Born: May 15, 1993 (age 33); Aviston, Illinois, U.S.
- Bats: Right Throws: Right

MLB debut
- April 2, 2018, for the Miami Marlins

MLB statistics (through 2026 season)
- Win–loss record: 24–29
- Earned run average: 4.43
- Strikeouts: 689
- Stats at Baseball Reference

Teams
- Miami Marlins (2018–2019); Tampa Bay Rays (2019–2021); Milwaukee Brewers (2021); Toronto Blue Jays (2021–2024); Minnesota Twins (2024); Kansas City Royals (2025); Arizona Diamondbacks (2025); Philadelphia Phillies (2026); Chicago White Sox (2026)

Trevor Michael Richards (born May 15, 1993) is an American professional baseball pitcher who is a free agent. He has played in Major League Baseball (MLB) for the Miami Marlins, Tampa Bay Rays, Milwaukee Brewers, Toronto Blue Jays, Minnesota Twins, Kansas City Royals, Arizona Diamondbacks, Philadelphia Phillies, and Chicago White Sox. He was signed by the Marlins in 2016 and made his MLB debut with them in 2018.

== Career ==
=== Amateur career ===
Richards attended Mater Dei High School in Breese, Illinois. In 2011, his senior year, he went 9–1 with a 1.07 ERA. After high school, he enrolled and played college baseball at Drury University. As a senior in 2015, he had a 5–3 win-loss record with a 3.61 ERA in 11 starts.

=== Gateway Grizzlies ===
He was not drafted by an MLB team in the 2015 MLB draft, and signed with the Gateway Grizzlies of the independent Frontier League. In 2015, Richards posted a 3.36 ERA in 14 starts for the Grizzlies. During eight starts in 2016, he posted a 3.21 ERA and was among the league leaders in strikeouts.

=== Miami Marlins ===
After one and-a-half seasons with the Grizzlies, he was signed by the Miami Marlins in July 2016. He spent 2016 with the Batavia Muckdogs and the Greensboro Grasshoppers, both in Single-A, posting a combined 2–3 record and 2.48 ERA in nine starts (11 appearances). In 2017, he was named the Marlins Minor League Pitcher of the Year after going 12–11 with a 2.53 ERA and 158 strikeouts over 146.0 innings pitched in 27 games (25 starts) between the Advanced-A Jupiter Hammerheads and the Double-A Jacksonville Jumbo Shrimp.

On April 2, 2018, Richards was called up by the Miami Marlins to make his first MLB start. He pitched 4 1/3 innings, giving up eight hits and five runs (all earned) while striking out five and walking one; he took the loss, as the Marlins were defeated by the Boston Red Sox, 7–3. On April 25, facing Clayton Kershaw and the Los Angeles Dodgers, Richards pitched 4 2/3 innings, giving up one hit and striking out 10. Richards finished the 2018 season with a 4–9 record in 25 starts. He struck out 130 batters in 126 1/3 innings.

For the 2019 season, Richards began the season in the Marlins rotation. He was moved to the bullpen on July 26 after going 3–12 in 20 starts.

=== Tampa Bay Rays ===
On July 31, 2019, Richards was traded to the Tampa Bay Rays (along with Nick Anderson) in exchange for Jesús Sánchez and Ryne Stanek. He made his first start as a Ray on August 18, 2019, against the Detroit Tigers, allowing two runs across three and a half innings in a 5–4 Tampa Bay victory. In 2020 for the Rays, Richards pitched to a bloated 5.91 ERA and 1.72 WHIP in 9 appearances, including four starts. In 2021, Richards had 16 strikeouts in 12 innings for the Rays.

=== Milwaukee Brewers ===
On May 21, 2021, the Rays traded Richards and Willy Adames to the Milwaukee Brewers in exchange for Drew Rasmussen and J. P. Feyereisen. In 15 appearances and 19 2/3 innings before being traded, Richards posted a 3–0 record on a 3.20 ERA.

=== Toronto Blue Jays ===
On July 6, 2021, the Brewers traded Richards to the Toronto Blue Jays along with Bowden Francis in exchange for Rowdy Tellez. In 32 games out of the bullpen, he compiled a 4–2 record and 3.31 ERA with 37 strikeouts across 32 2/3 innings pitched. Richards made 62 appearances for the Blue Jays in 2022, accumulating a 3–2 record and 5.34 ERA with 82 strikeouts across 64 innings.

On January 13, 2023, Richards signed a one-year, $1.5 million contract with the Blue Jays, avoiding salary arbitration. He appeared in 56 contests for Toronto in 2023, recording a 4.95 ERA with 105 strikeouts over 72 2/3 innings of work. Richards pitched in 45 games for the Blue Jays in 2024, posting a 2–1 record and 4.64 ERA with 49 strikeouts in 52 1/3 innings pitched.

=== Minnesota Twins ===
On July 30, 2024, Richards was traded to the Minnesota Twins in exchange for minor-leaguer Jay Harry. In 10 games for Minnesota, he registered a 4.15 ERA with 13 strikeouts across 13 innings of work. Richards was designated for assignment by the Twins on August 27. He cleared waivers and was sent outright to the Triple–A St. Paul Saints on September 2. Richards elected free agency on October 1.

=== Chicago Cubs ===
On January 21, 2025, Richards signed a minor league contract with the Chicago Cubs. In seven appearances (one start) for the Triple-A Iowa Cubs, he struggled to an 0-2 record and 7.27 ERA with 12 strikeouts across 8 2/3 innings pitched. Richards was released by the Cubs organization on May 3.

=== Kansas City Royals ===
On May 8, 2025, Richards signed a minor league contract with the Kansas City Royals. In 10 appearances for the Triple-A Omaha Storm Chasers, he recorded a 1.69 ERA with 11 strikeouts and two saves across 10 2/3 innings pitched. On June 7, the Royals selected Richards' contract, adding him to their active roster. In three appearances for Kansas City, he struggled to a 12.00 ERA with two strikeouts across three innings of work. Richards was designated for assignment by the Royals on June 11. He elected free agency after clearing waivers on June 13.

=== Arizona Diamondbacks ===
On June 19, 2025, Richards signed a minor league contract with the Arizona Diamondbacks. In nine appearances for the Triple-A Reno Aces, he recorded a 6.57 ERA with eight strikeouts over 12 1/3 innings pitched. On July 18, the Diamondbacks selected Richards' contract, adding him to their active roster. In two appearances for Arizona, he registered a 3.38 ERA with three strikeouts across 2 2/3 innings pitched. On July 26, Richards was designated for assignment by the Diamondbacks. He cleared waivers and was sent outright to Triple-A Reno on July 28. Richards elected free agency on October 14.

=== Philadelphia Phillies ===
On December 11, 2025, Richards signed a minor league contract with the Philadelphia Phillies. He was assigned to the Triple-A Lehigh Valley IronPigs to begin the regular season, where he recorded a 1.93 ERA over his first nine appearances. On April 30, 2026, the Phillies selected Richards' contract, adding him to their active roster. He made two appearances for Philadelphia, recording a 2.08 ERA with five strikeouts across 4 1/3 innings pitched.

=== Chicago White Sox ===
On May 5, 2026, Richards was traded to the Chicago White Sox in exchange for cash considerations.

== Personal life ==
Richards grew up a St. Louis Cardinals fan. He and his wife, Aunna, became engaged in 2018 and married in 2019. They reside in Springfield, Missouri.
