= Tommy Nance =

American baseball player (born 1991)

Minnesota Twins – No. 35
- Pitcher
- Born: March 19, 1991 (age 35); Long Beach, California, U.S.
- Bats: Right Throws: Right

MLB debut
- May 17, 2021, for the Chicago Cubs

MLB statistics (through 2026 season)
- Win–loss record: 8–10
- Earned run average: 4.22
- Strikeouts: 206
- Stats at Baseball Reference

Teams
- Chicago Cubs (2021); Miami Marlins (2022); Toronto Blue Jays (2024–2026); Minnesota Twins (2026–present)

Thomas Andrew Nance (born March 19, 1991) is an American professional baseball pitcher for the Minnesota Twins of Major League Baseball (MLB). He has previously played in MLB for the Chicago Cubs, Miami Marlins, and Toronto Blue Jays.

== Early life and amateur career ==
Nance attended Woodrow Wilson High School in Long Beach, California. In high school he had a stress fracture in his lower back.

He played college baseball at Long Beach State, Cypress College, and Santa Clara.

He underwent Tommy John surgery after his senior year of college.

== Professional career ==
=== Windy City Thunderbolts ===
In 2015, Nance went undrafted out of Santa Clara University, and signed with the Windy City Thunderbolts of the Frontier League. In 29 games, Nance registered a 4.74 ERA and a 1–1 record with 40 strikeouts in 38 innings and a 1.421 WHIP.

=== Chicago Cubs ===
On January 18, 2016, Nance had his contract purchased by the Chicago Cubs organization. He split the 2016 season between four Cubs affiliates, the Low-A Eugene Emeralds, the Single-A South Bend Cubs, the High-A Myrtle Beach Pelicans, and the Triple-A Iowa Cubs. He accumulated a 4–1 record and 2.58 ERA in 22 games between the four teams.

He did not play in a game in 2017 due to injury, after being diagnosed with nerve injury in his shoulder. He spent the 2018 season in Double-A with the Tennessee Smokies, where he recorded a 3.48 ERA in 15 appearances. He split 2019 between Tennessee and Myrtle Beach, pitching to a 2–5 record and 4.07 ERA with 56 strikeouts in 48.2 innings of work.

Nance did not play in a game in 2020 due to the cancellation of the minor league season because of the COVID-19 pandemic. He was assigned to Triple-A Iowa to begin the 2021 season. On May 9, Nance pitched the fourth through sixth innings of a no-hitter against the Indianapolis Indians at Principal Park in Des Moines, Iowa. Preceded on the mound by Shelby Miller, he struck out five batters over three innings before being relieved by Brad Wieck and Ryan Meisinger who completed the combined no-hit game. On May 16, after recording a 1.50 ERA in 3 games with Iowa, Nance was selected to the 40-man roster and promoted to the major leagues for the first time. Nance made his MLB debut on May 17, pitching a scoreless inning of relief. In the game, he recorded his first Major League strikeout, punching out the first batter he faced, Washington Nationals infielder Josh Harrison. On June 11, Nance earned his first MLB victory against the St. Louis Cardinals. On October 2, Nance was placed on the COVID-19 injured list.

In 2021 for the Cubs the 30-year-old was 1-1 with a 7.22 ERA. In 27 games his pitched 28.2 innings, in which he gave up 23 earned runs. On March 25, 2022, Nance was designated for assignment.

=== Miami Marlins ===
On March 27, 2022, the Miami Marlins claimed Nance off waivers. He made 35 appearances for the Marlins in 2022, posting a 2-3 record and 4.33 ERA with 57 strikeouts over 43 2/3 innings pitched.

In 2023, Nance suffered a right shoulder strain in February that caused him to begin the regular season on the injured list. He was placed on the 60-day injured list on April 22 amid his recovery. On August 23, Nance was activated from the injured list. He was placed back on the 60–day injured list with an undisclosed injury on September 19, ending his season without having made an appearance for Miami. Following the season on November 6, Nance was removed from the 40–man roster and sent outright to the Triple–A Jacksonville Jumbo Shrimp. He elected free agency the same day.

=== San Diego Padres ===
On December 10, 2023, Nance signed a minor league contract with the San Diego Padres. In 26 appearances for the Triple–A El Paso Chihuahuas in 2024, Nance logged a 4.05 ERA with 35 strikeouts and 2 saves across 33 1/3 innings pitched.

=== Toronto Blue Jays ===
On August 7, 2024, Nance was traded to the Toronto Blue Jays in exchange for cash considerations. The next day, Toronto selected his contract and added him to their active roster. In 20 appearances for the Blue Jays, he compiled an 0-3 record and 4.09 ERA with 19 strikeouts over 22 innings of work.

Nance was designated for assignment by Toronto on March 27, 2025. He cleared waivers and was sent outright to the Triple-A Buffalo Bisons on March 30. In 27 appearances for Buffalo, Nance logged an 0-4 record and 4.60 ERA with 42 strikeouts and four saves across 31 1/3 innings pitched. On July 11, the Blue Jays selected Nance's contract, adding him to their active roster.

On March 22, 2026, Nance was among one of the final relief pitchers selected to start the season with the Toronto Blue Jays.

=== Minnesota Twins ===
On July 10, 2026, Nance was traded to the Minnesota Twins in exchange for minor league infielder Ryan Sprock.
