= Will Wagner (baseball) =

American baseball player (born 1998)

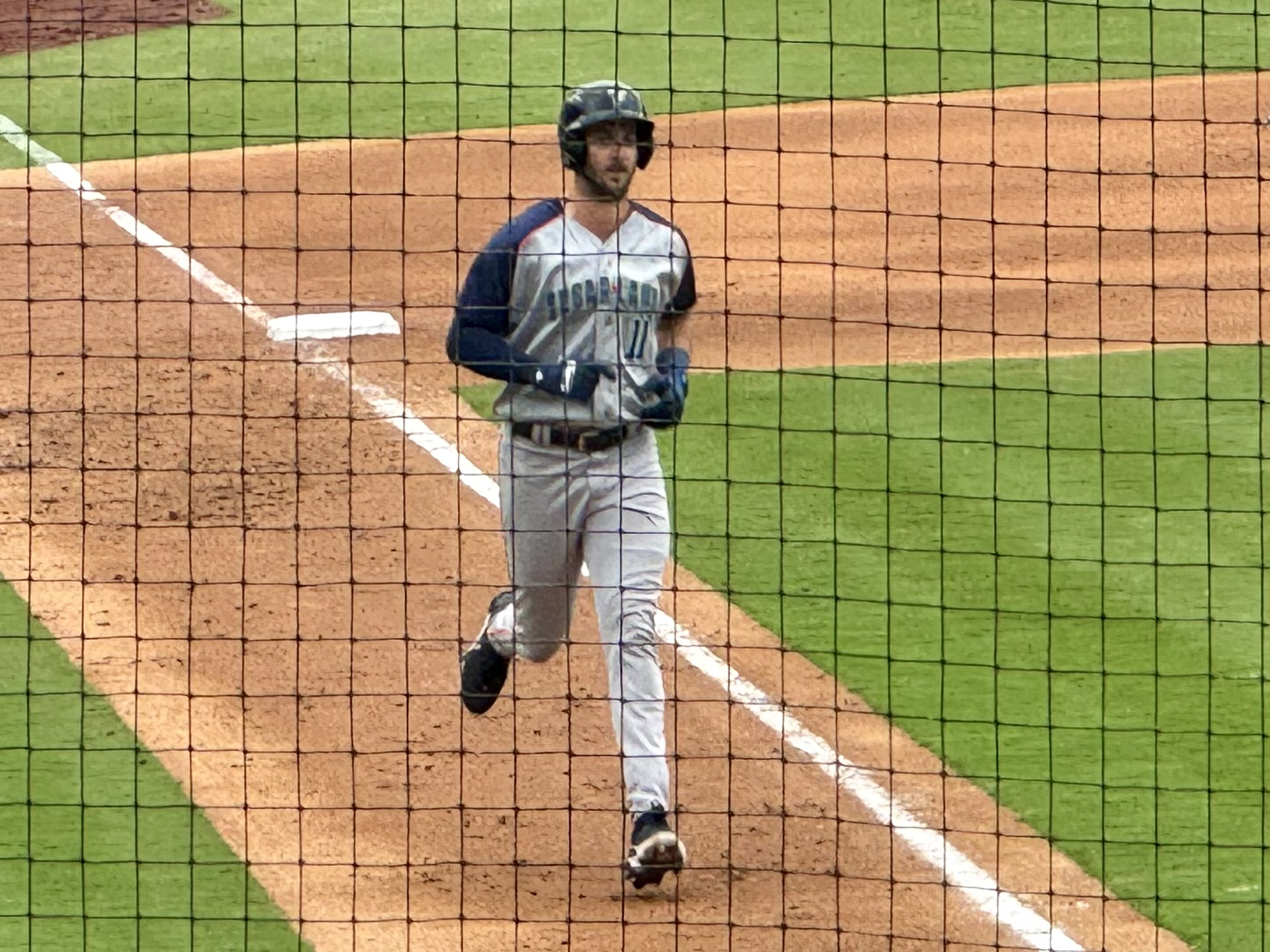
- Wagner with the Sugar Land Space Cowboys

San Diego Padres – No. 7
- Infielder
- Born: July 29, 1998 (age 28); Houston, Texas, U.S.
- Bats: Left Throws: Right

MLB debut
- August 12, 2024 (Note: Wagner made his MLB debut on August 12, 2024. On August 26, 2024, he appeared in the resumption of a suspended game that had begun on June 26, 2024. As all MLB statistics are recorded on the date that a game started, Wagner has MLB statistics with a June 26 date.), for the Toronto Blue Jays

MLB statistics (through 2026 season)
- Batting average: .256
- Home runs: 2
- Runs batted in: 18
- Stats at Baseball Reference

Teams
- Toronto Blue Jays (2024–2025); San Diego Padres (2025–present)

William James Wagner (born July 29, 1998) is an American professional baseball infielder for the San Diego Padres of Major League Baseball (MLB). He has previously played in MLB for the Toronto Blue Jays. He is the son of Hall of Fame reliever Billy Wagner.

== High school and college ==
Wagner attended the Miller School of Albemarle in Charlottesville, Virginia, where his father, former MLB pitcher and Baseball Hall of Famer Billy Wagner, was his manager. He played college baseball at Liberty University for four years.

== Professional career ==
=== Houston Astros ===
The Houston Astros selected Wagner in the 18th round of the 2021 Major League Baseball draft. He made his professional debut with the Fayetteville Woodpeckers and spent 2022 with the Asheville Tourists and Corpus Christi Hooks. After the season, he played in the Arizona Fall League. In 2023, the Astros invited him to spring training.

=== Toronto Blue Jays ===
On July 29, 2024, Wagner, Joey Loperfido, and Jake Bloss were traded to the Toronto Blue Jays in exchange for pitcher Yusei Kikuchi. In seven games for the Triple–A Buffalo Bisons, he batted .400/.516/.600 with one home run and two RBI. On August 12, Wagner was selected to the 40-man roster and promoted to the major leagues for the first time. He debuted that day against the Los Angeles Angels, recording three hits and a run batted in for a 4–2 win. On August 27, against the Boston Red Sox, Wagner hit his first major-league home run off of Brennan Bernardino. On August 31, Wagner had a five-hit game against the Minnesota Twins in a 15–0 victory, being the first time a five-hit game has been recorded in club history by a rookie. In 24 games during his rookie campaign, he slashed .305/.337/.451 with two home runs and 11 RBI. On September 17, Wagner was placed on the 60–day injured list with left knee inflammation, prematurely ending his season.

Wagner made 40 appearances for the Blue Jays in 2025, slashing .237/.336/.298 with seven RBI and one stolen base.

=== San Diego Padres ===
On July 31, 2025, the Blue Jays traded Wagner to the San Diego Padres in exchange for Brandon Valenzuela.
