= 2026 Washington Nationals season =

2026 Washington Nationals
- League: National League
- Division: East
- Ballpark: Nationals Park
- City: Washington, D.C.
- Record: 77–85 (.475)
- Divisional place: 4th
- Owners: Lerner Enterprises
- President of baseball operations: Paul Toboni
- General manager: Anirudh Kilambi
- Manager: Blake Butera
- Television: MLB Local Media (Dan Kolko, Kevin Frandsen, Alexa Datt)
- Radio: 106.7 The Fan; Washington Nationals Radio Network (Dave Jageler, Charlie Slowes)

The 2026 Washington Nationals season was the Nationals' 22nd season as the Major League Baseball franchise in the District of Columbia, the 19th season at Nationals Park, and the 58th since the original team was started in Montreal, Quebec, Canada.

This was the Nationals' first season under President of Baseball Operations Paul Toboni, general manager Anirudh Kilambi, and manager Blake Butera, as well as their first season to be broadcast on television by MLB Local Media (as Nationals.TV).

== Offseason ==
=== Team news ===
Several major changes defined the Washington Nationals' 2025–26 offseason, including overhauls of the front office, coaching staff, and player development system; trades, waiver claims, and other roster moves; and a new television broadcast arrangement.

==== Front office ====
The Nationals finished out the 2025 season under interim general manager Mike DeBartolo, after dismissing president of baseball operations Mike Rizzo and manager Dave Martinez in July.

Within days of their season ending with a 66–96 record, placing them last in the National League East Division, the Nationals announced the hiring of 35-year-old Boston Red Sox assistant general manager Paul Toboni as their new president of baseball operations. DeBartolo remained with the organization under Toboni as an assistant general manager and senior vice president. Several other members of the front office, including longtime assistant general managers Eddie Longosz and Mark Scialabba, were not retained. Toboni made several key additions to his leadership team, including Philadelphia Phillies assistant general manager Anirudh Kilambi as general manager, (Note: Associated Press (December 18, 2025). "Ani Kilambi, 31, is joining the Washington Nationals as their general manager". NBC Sports Washington. Prior to his dismissal in July 2025, Mike Rizzo had held the positions of general manager and president of baseball operations simultaneously since the 2013 season. With the hiring of Kilambi, the Nationals officially separated the jobs, establishing a hierarchy in which the general manager would report to the president of baseball operations.) former colleague and Red Sox scouting director Devin Pearson and Pittsburgh Pirates scouting director Justin Horowitz as assistant general managers, and Red Sox field coordinator Andrew Wright as his special assistant.

On January 6, 2026, the Nationals announced the hiring of Jason Sinnarajah as president of business operations. Sinnarajah, formerly chief operating officer of the Kansas City Royals, would report to ownership and handle the business side of the Nationals organization, as counterpart to Toboni in his role overseeing baseball operations. (Note: The hiring of Toboni and Sinnarajah during the 2025–26 offseason marked the first time the Nationals franchise had employed two separate team presidents overseeing baseball and business operations, respectively. (See Mears, Stephen G., "Wiemer, Serrano, Suarez, and Sinnarajah in Nats News & Notes", TalkNats.com, January 6, 2026.))

==== Coaching staff ====
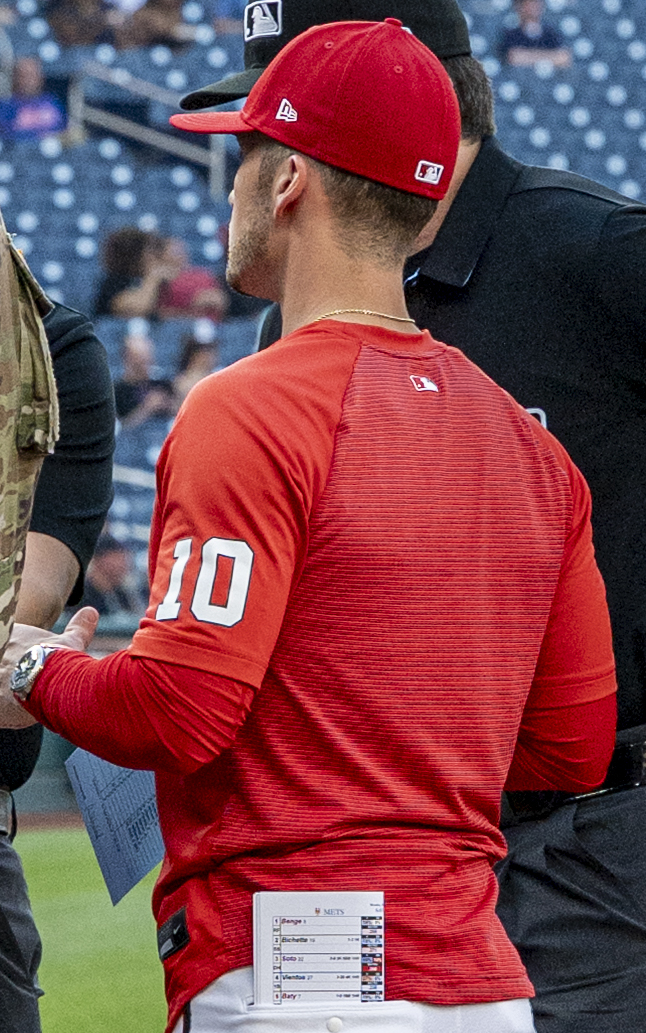
Blake Butera became the youngest major league manager in more than half a century when he was hired by the Nationals.

The 2025 Nationals coaching staff's contracts expired after the end of the World Series.

While Washington was linked in media reports to 2025 interim manager Miguel Cairo, former Minnesota Twins manager Rocco Baldelli, former Baltimore Orioles manager Brandon Hyde, Portland Sea Dogs manager Chad Epperson, Cleveland Guardians bench coach Craig Albernaz, and Los Angeles Dodgers bench coach Danny Lehmann, Toboni's choice for the new manager of the Nationals was a surprise: 33-year-old Blake Butera, the Tampa Bay Rays senior director of player development and two-time Carolina League Manager of the Year. Upon their hiring, both Butera and Toboni were the youngest people in Major League Baseball to hold their positions, respectively as team manager and top executive.

Among 12 coaches the Nationals brought in under Butera, (Note: The full 2026 coaching staff under manager Blake Butera: Bench coach Michael Johns (previously Tampa Bay Rays first base coach); Hitting coach Matt Borgschulte (previously Minnesota Twins hitting coach); Pitching coach Simon Mathews (previously Cincinnati Reds assistant pitching coach); Assistant hitting coach Andrew Aydt (previously Driveline Baseball assistant director of hitting); Assistant hitting coach Shawn O'Malley (previously Class-AAA Tacoma Rainiers hitting coach); Assistant pitching coach Sean Doolittle (previously Nationals pitching strategist); Assistant pitching/bullpen coach Dustin Glant (previously Indiana University pitching coach); First base/outfield/baserunning coach Corey Ray (previously Arizona Complex League Cubs manager); Third base/infield coach Víctor Estévez (previously High-A Wisconsin Timber Rattlers manager); Field coordinator Tyler Smarslok (previously Miami Marlins first base coach); Catching coach/run game coordinator Bobby Wilson (previously Texas Rangers catching coordinator); Development coach/bullpen catcher Grant Anders (previously Baltimore Orioles major league development coach); (See Camerato, Jessica, "Butera makes 1st staff hire, adds Johns as bench coach", MLB.com, November 10, 2025; Nusbaum, Spencer, "Nationals name Simon Mathews, 30, pitching coach", The Washington Post, November 11, 2025; and "Nationals announce Major League coaching staff", Curly W Live, December 23, 2025.)) they retained just one holdover from their 2024–25 staff: former Nationals closer Sean Doolittle, who was named the assistant pitching coach after two seasons as a pitching strategist. The average age of the coaching staff dropped from 51 in 2025 to about 36, as The Washington Post reported, with several of Butera's coaches still in their 20s and 30s. Many of the new coaches came to the Nationals from backgrounds in player development, including minor league managers Víctor Estévez and Corey Ray and college coach Dustin Glant. The Nationals added more coaching positions than they had in previous years, with changes including two assistant hitting and pitching coaches instead of one and the new role of development coach.

==== Player development system ====
More than a dozen minor league coaches and player development staff members were dismissed early in the offseason. Among other areas of the Nationals organization, Toboni moved to overhaul the player development side, staffing it with hitting and pitching coordinators for the lower and higher minor league levels, under directors to provide a cohesive approach up and down the minor league system.

The Nationals hired away former hitting coach Jeremy Barnes and minor league pitching coordinator Grayson Crawford from the division-rival New York Mets to be their new directors of defense, baserunning, and game play and pitching, respectively. They hired CJ Gillman, previously a minor league hitting coordinator with the Seattle Mariners, as their director of hitting. Former Nationals outfielder Gerardo Parra, who was not retained as first base coach after the 2025 season, was kept on as a player development advisor.

The Nationals expanded the number of coaches for their minor league affiliates, adding more training and conditioning coaches, as well as a defensive coach and assistant pitching coach at every level. They retained Class-AAA Rochester Red Wings manager Matt LeCroy and Class-AA Harrisburg Senators manager Delino DeShields with mostly new coaching staffs. More collegiate coaches were brought on to manage Washington's low-minors affiliates: Former University of Central Florida assistant coach Ted Tom was hired to manage the High-A Wilmington Blue Rocks, while Virginia Commonwealth University hitting coach Chris O'Neill joined the organization as manager of the Low-A Fredericksburg Nationals.

Washington also invested in more technology and training equipment, one of the major offseason priorities for Toboni and Pearson, to enhance player development. Technology such as Trajekt Arc simulated pitching machines and HitTrax hitting analysis machines was acquired for Nationals team facilities, including their spring training home at the Cacti Park of the Palm Beaches in West Palm Beach, Florida, and their Class-AAA ESL Ballpark in Rochester, New York. The spring training stadium was also upgraded to Statcast standards with systems like Hawk-Eye and Trackman, to provide more game data.

==== Player roster ====
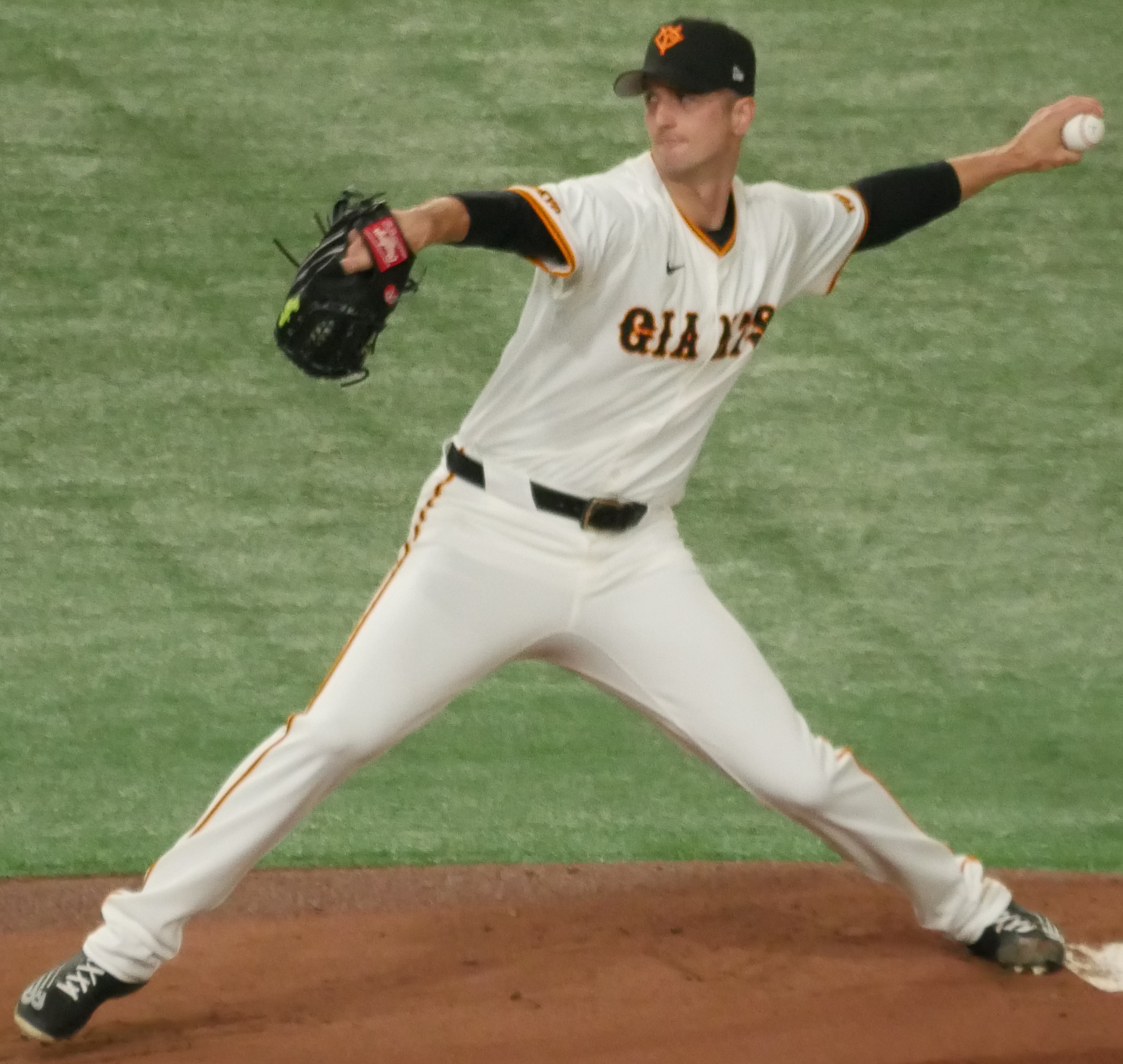
Left-handed pitcher Foster Griffin, coming off a strong stint with the Yomiuri Giants, was the first free agent signed by the Nationals during the offseason.

The Nationals removed several players from the roster before the end of the 2025 World Series: relievers Shinnosuke Ogasawara, Eduardo Salazar, and Mason Thompson and catchers Jorge Alfaro and C. J. Stubbs. Reliever Derek Law, first baseman Josh Bell, and third baseman Paul DeJong became free agents as their contracts expired. The Nationals went on to trim several more players from the roster during the offseason, including pitchers Zach Brzykcy, Andry Lara, Ryan Loutos, and Konnor Pilkington, longtime backup catcher Riley Adams, and infielder Trey Lipscomb. Washington also released reliever Sauryn Lao at his request to pursue a playing opportunity in Nippon Professional Baseball (NPB).

Washington tendered new contracts to starting pitchers Cade Cavalli, MacKenzie Gore, Josiah Gray, and Jake Irvin as well as infielders CJ Abrams and Luis García Jr., who were each eligible for arbitration. They agreed to terms with all of their arbitration-eligible players, including Cavalli on a one-year contract with a club option for the 2027 season.

The team protected three prospects eligible for the Rule 5 draft by adding them to the roster: pitchers Jake Bennett and Riley Cornelio and outfielder Christian Franklin. The Nationals were active in the Rule 5 draft themselves, selecting Philadelphia Phillies pitching prospect Griff McGarry to the major league roster.

The Nationals announced their first major league free agent signing under Toboni on December 22, signing starting pitcher Foster Griffin for a reported $5.5 million after Griffin spent three seasons overseas, pitching for NPB's Yomiuri Giants. They signed another free agent starter, veteran Miles Mikolas, for a reported $2.25 million on February 11. On March 10, the Nationals signed a third free agent starter, adding right-hander Zack Littell on a one-year deal for a reported $3 million, plus a mutual option at a reported $12 million salary with a $4 million buyout.

Throughout the offseason, Washington also acquired several players by claiming them off waivers, including pitchers Paxton Schultz from the Toronto Blue Jays, Gus Varland from the Arizona Diamondbacks, Ken Waldichuk from the Tampa Bay Rays and outfielder Joey Wiemer from the San Francisco Giants.

Toboni executed his first trade at the helm of the Nationals by sending closer José A. Ferrer to the Seattle Mariners for prospects Harry Ford and Isaac Lyon on December 6. On December 15, the Nationals traded Bennett to the Red Sox for another pitching prospect, Luis Perales. After weeks of trade rumors, Gore went to the Texas Rangers in a five-for-one blockbuster headlined by infield prospect Gavin Fien on January 22. On February 10, days after claiming relief pitcher George Soriano off waivers from the Atlanta Braves and then designating him for assignment, the Nationals traded Soriano to the St. Louis Cardinals for fellow reliever Andre Granillo. The Nationals traded another young pitcher, prospect Sean Paul Liñan, to the New York Yankees on March 22, receiving infielder Jorbit Vivas in exchange.

Other trade rumors swirled around the Nationals throughout the offseason. Both before and after trading Gore to Texas, Toboni publicly acknowledged the Nationals were listening to offers for Abrams and other players as well, although he publicly disputed a report from The Washington Post that the Nationals were "shopping" Abrams and outfielder Jacob Young in particular.

==== Broadcasting ====
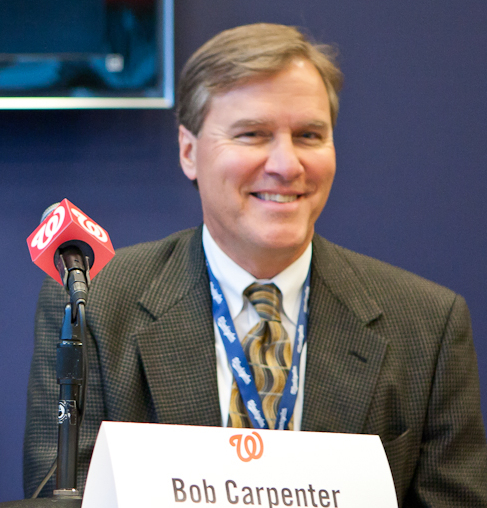
Bob Carpenter's retirement left the Nationals in search of a new play-by-play commentator during the offseason.

Before the 2025 season, the Nationals and MASN agreed to a new one-year broadcasting contract, as part of the settlement of a long-running legal dispute between the Nationals and the Baltimore Orioles (Note: The Mid-Atlantic Sports Network was jointly owned by the Nationals and the Orioles. However, as part of the original agreement that allowed the Montreal Expos to relocate to Washington, D.C., beginning with the 2005 season, the Orioles were granted majority ownership in perpetuity, effectively placing them in control of the Nationals' television rights. Alleging they were owed more in television rights fees than the Orioles had been paying them, dating back to 2012, the Nationals sued the Orioles in 2014. The Orioles and MASN disputed the Nationals' claims and countersued, effectively blocking the Nationals from withdrawing from MASN. For more than 10 years, the teams contested the terms of the contract and what the Nationals were owed. The March 2025 settlement resolved the outstanding legal battles between the two teams and gave the Nationals the right to exit MASN for the first time in 2026. (See Frank, Noah, "Nationals-Orioles MASN dispute goes public", WTOP News, July 29, 2014, Barker, Jeff, "Once again, Orioles challenging baseball’s establishment", The Baltimore Sun, August 16, 2014, Connolly, Dan, "Court rules against Orioles, MASN in dispute with Nationals over TV rights fees", The Athletic, April 25, 2023, "Nationals, Orioles settle lengthy dispute over MASN TV rights", ESPN.com, March 3, 2025, and Keeley, Sean, "MASN, Orioles negotiating with Nationals to continue sharing network", Awful Announcing, August 1, 2025.)) over television rights. With the Nationals free to negotiate a new broadcast deal, the team and Major League Baseball announced a new partnership that has MLB Local Media producing and distributing Nationals television broadcasts starting in 2026, via a new over-the-air cable channel and streaming platform called Nationals.TV.

Nationals play-by-play announcer Bob Carpenter retired at the end of the 2025 season, after 20 years of calling games for the team on MASN television broadcasts. After the announcement of the Nationals.TV channel, the team announced that longtime MASN studio host and sideline reporter Dan Kolko would take over play-by-play duties, alongside returning color commentator Kevin Frandsen. The Nationals also hired Washington-area native Alexa Datt, a St. Louis Cardinals studio host and sideline reporter, to take on a similar role on Nationals.TV.

=== Offseason transactions ===
- October 1, 2025: The Nationals hired Paul Toboni as president of baseball operations.
- October 29: The Nationals outrighted right-handed pitchers Eduardo Salazar and Mason Thompson, left-handed pitcher Shinnosuke Ogasawara, and catcher C. J. Stubbs to the minor leagues; Salazar, Thompson, and Stubbs elected free agency.
- October 31: The Nationals hired Blake Butera as manager and outrighted catcher Jorge Alfaro to the minor leagues; Alfaro elected free agency.
- November 6: The Nationals outrighted infielder Trey Lipscomb to the minor leagues and lost right-handed pitchers Zach Brzykcy to the Miami Marlins and Ryan Loutos to the Seattle Mariners on waiver claims.
- November 10: The Nationals hired Michael Johns as bench coach.
- November 11: The Nationals hired Simon Mathews as pitching coach and Bobby Wilson as catching coach.
- November 18: The Nationals selected the contracts of right-handed pitcher Jake Bennett, left-handed pitcher Riley Cornelio, and outfielder Christian Franklin and hired Tyler Smarslok as field coordinator.
- November 21: The Nationals hired Andrew Aydt as assistant hitting coach and signed catcher Riley Adams to a one-year contract extension, avoiding arbitration.
- November 29: The Nationals hired Grant Anders as development coach.
- December 1: The Nationals hired Corey Ray as first base coach.
- December 6: The Nationals acquired catcher Harry Ford and minor league pitcher Isaac Lyon from the Seattle Mariners for left-handed pitcher José A. Ferrer.
- December 8: The Nationals hired Matt Borgschulte as hitting coach, Dustin Glant as assistant pitching/bullpen coach, and Víctor Estévez as third base coach.
- December 10: The Nationals purchased the contract of right-handed pitcher Griff McGarry from the Philadelphia Phillies via the Rule 5 draft.
- December 12: The Nationals signed right-handed pitcher Josiah Gray to a one-year contract extension, avoiding arbitration.
- December 15: The Nationals acquired right-handed pitcher Luis Perales from the Boston Red Sox for left-handed pitcher Jake Bennett.
- December 18: The Nationals hired Anirudh Kilambi as general manager and signed infielder Warming Bernabel to a minor league contract with an invitation to spring training.
- December 22: The Nationals signed left-handed pitcher Foster Griffin to a one-year major league contract.
- December 23: The Nationals hired Shawn O'Malley as assistant hitting coach.
- December 24: The Nationals signed first baseman Matt Mervis to a minor league contract with an invitation to spring training.
- January 5, 2026: The Nationals claimed outfielder Joey Wiemer off waivers from the San Francisco Giants.
- January 6: The Nationals hired Jason Sinnarajah as president of business operations.
- January 8: The Nationals signed right-handed pitcher Jake Irvin, left-handed pitcher MacKenzie Gore, second baseman Luis García Jr., and shortstop CJ Abrams to one-year contract extensions, avoiding arbitration.
- January 9: The Nationals claimed right-handed pitcher Paxton Schultz off waivers from the Toronto Blue Jays and released right-handed pitcher Sauryn Lao.
- January 17: The Nationals signed right-handed pitcher Trevor Gott to a minor league contract with an invitation to spring training.
- January 18: The Nationals signed right-handed pitcher Cade Cavalli to a one-year contract extension with a team option for the 2027 season, avoiding arbitration.
- January 19: The Nationals signed left-handed pitcher Zach Penrod to a minor league contract with an invitation to spring training.
- January 20: The Nationals claimed catcher/infielder Mickey Gasper off waivers from the Minnesota Twins and designated right-handed pitcher Andry Lara for assignment; Lara was outrighted to the minor leagues.
- January 22: The Nationals acquired first baseman Abimelec Ortiz, minor league pitcher Alejandro Rosario, minor league infielders Gavin Fien and Devin Fitz-Gerald, and minor league outfielder Yeremy Cabrera from the Texas Rangers for left-handed pitcher MacKenzie Gore, claimed right-handed pitcher Gus Varland off waivers from the Arizona Diamondbacks, signed catcher Tres Barrera to a minor league contract with an invitation to spring training, signed infielder/outfielder Levi Jordan to a minor league contract, and designated catcher Riley Adams for assignment; Adams was outrighted to the minor leagues.
- January 23: The Nationals signed right-handed pitcher Bryce Montes de Oca to a minor league contract with an invitation to spring training.
- January 28: The Nationals claimed shortstop Tsung-Che Cheng off waivers from the New York Mets, signed infielder Sergio Alcántara to a minor league contract with an invitation to spring training, and designated left-handed pitcher Konnor Pilkington for assignment; Pilkington elected free agency.
- January 29: The Nationals claimed left-handed pitcher Richard Lovelady off waivers from the New York Mets and designated catcher/infielder Mickey Gasper for assignment; Gasper was claimed off waivers by the Boston Red Sox.
- January 30: The Nationals claimed right-handed pitcher George Soriano off waivers from the Atlanta Braves and designated shortstop Tsung-Che Cheng for assignment; Cheng was claimed off waivers by the Boston Red Sox.
- February 5: The Nationals claimed left-handed pitcher Ken Waldichuk off waivers from the Tampa Bay Rays and designated right-handed pitcher George Soriano for assignment.
- February 10: The Nationals acquired right-handed pitcher Andre Granillo from the St. Louis Cardinals for right-handed pitcher George Soriano.
- February 11: The Nationals signed right-handed pitcher Miles Mikolas to a one-year major league contract.
- February 14: The Nationals signed left-handed pitcher Cionel Pérez to a minor league contract with an invitation to spring training.
- February 16: The Nationals signed right-handed pitcher Drew Smith to a minor league contract with an invitation to spring training.
- March 10: The Nationals signed right-handed pitcher Zack Littell to a one-year major league contract with a mutual option for the 2027 season and designated left-handed pitcher Richard Lovelady for assignment; Lovelady was claimed off waivers by the New York Mets.
- March 21: The Nationals released minor league pitcher Drew Smith and minor league infielders Warming Bernabel and Orelvis Martínez.
- March 22: The Nationals acquired infielder Jorbit Vivas from the New York Yankees for minor league pitcher Sean Paul Liñan and designated right-handed pitcher Griff McGarry for assignment; McGarry was returned to the Philadelphia Phillies.
- March 23: The Nationals selected the contract of left-handed pitcher Cionel Pérez.
- March 24: The Nationals acquired minor league infielder Zack Short from the New York Yankees for cash considerations and released minor league infielder Sergio Alcántara.

=== Spring training ===
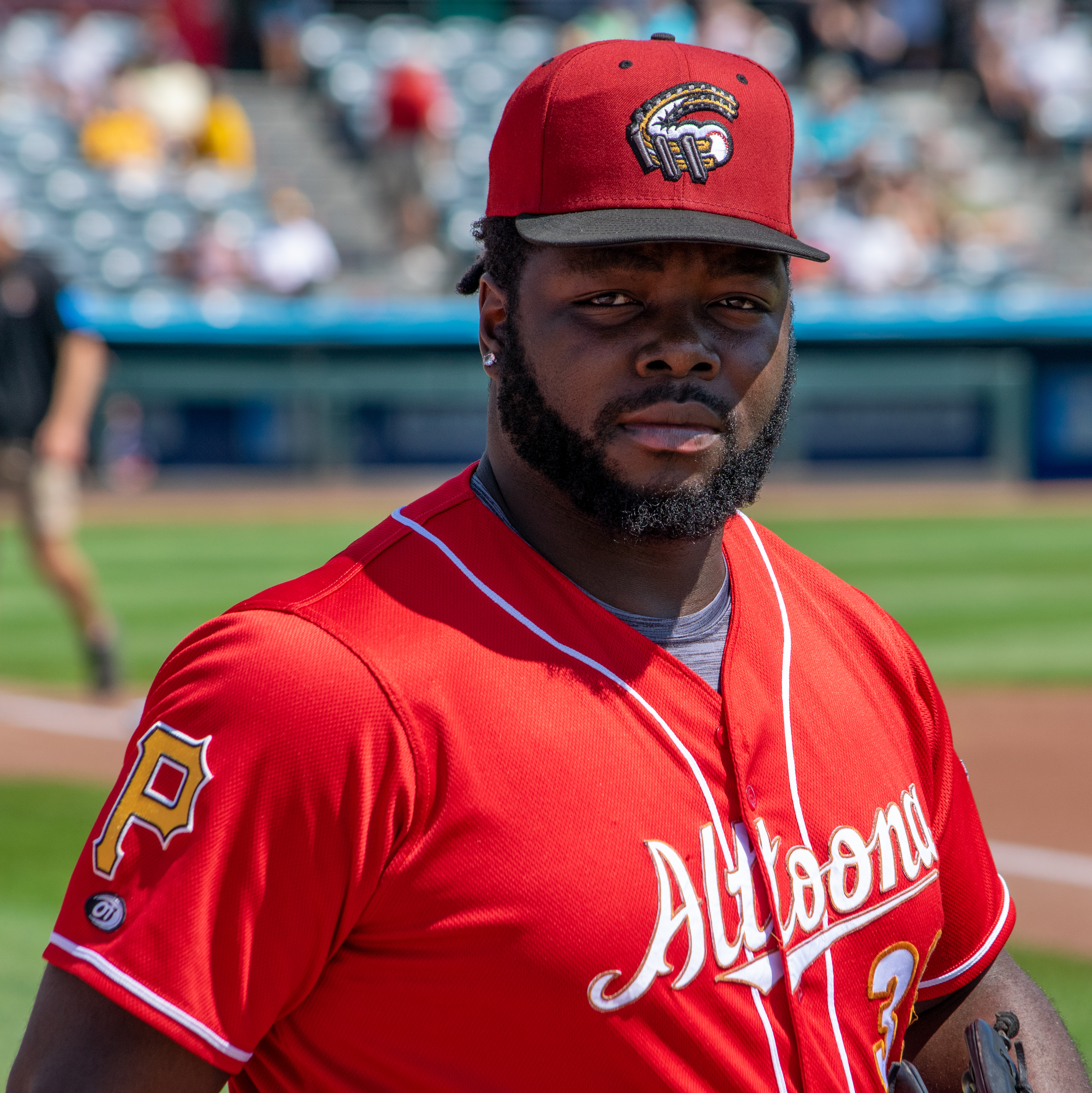
Eddy Yean, a former top pitching prospect of the Nationals, rejoined his original team as a minor league free agent and was invited to spring training.

The Nationals held their spring training at the Cacti Park of the Palm Beaches in West Palm Beach, Florida, finishing with a 14–9 record of wins and losses that stood as the third-best in the Grapefruit League. (Note: Although the exhibition did not count toward their Grapefruit League record or player statistics, Washington also defeated the eventual 2026 World Baseball Classic champion Venezuela in a March 4 tuneup. (See Lehmann, Bennett, "New pitching acquisition shines as Nationals defeat Team Venezuela in exhibition", District on Deck, March 5, 2026, and Perry, Dayn, "Venezuela beats Team USA to win World Baseball Classic: American bats fall short despite late-inning comeback", CBS Sports, March 17, 2026.) The Nationals lost a pair of exhibition games at Oriole Park at Camden Yards and Nationals Park against the Baltimore Orioles that were scheduled in between spring training and Opening Day. (See Weyrich, Matt, "Orioles’ Shane Baz, Chris Bassitt dominate Nationals for exhibition sweep", The Baltimore Sun, March 23, 2026.)) They invited the following non-roster players to major league camp: pitchers Tyler Baum, Trevor Gott, Andry Lara, Bryce Montes de Oca, Shinnosuke Ogasawara, Zach Penrod, Cionel Pérez, Drew Smith, Jarlin Susana, Travis Sykora, and Eddy Yean; catchers Riley Adams, Tres Barrera, Caleb Lomavita, and Max Romero Jr.; infielders Sergio Alcántara, Warming Bernabel, Seaver King, Trey Lipscomb, Orelvis Martínez, Matt Mervis, Yohandy Morales, and Cayden Wallace; and outfielders Phillip Glasser and Andrew Pinckney.

Players in spring training were coached through several drills and exercises introduced by new coaches. Instructors and players also took advantage of new technology added to the ballpark—including by holding live batting practice in the stadium—aligning with many other teams that had been quicker to embrace data and analytics. In another change from previous years, the Nationals also held a supplemental training camp for select minor leaguers, beginning in January.

At the start of spring training, the Nationals placed starting pitchers DJ Herz and Trevor Williams on the 60-day injured list, with both still rehabilitating after elbow surgeries during the 2025 season. Starting pitcher Josiah Gray was placed on the 60-day injured list at the end of spring training with a right flexor strain, after struggling with diminished velocity and missing the cut for the Opening Day roster. Gray had entered camp looking to return to the major leagues after not pitching in MLB in 2025 due to injury. (Note: Relievers Trevor Gott, Bryce Montes de Oca, Drew Smith, Gus Varland, and Ken Waldichuk came into spring training in a similar situation, having been limited by injuries and unable to make it back to MLB in 2025. Varland and Waldichuk ultimately made the Nationals' roster out of spring training. (See Roberts, Jackson, "Nationals Sign 8-Year MLB Veteran After Mariners Release", Sports Illustrated, January 20, 2026, "Nationals' Bryce Montes de Oca: Looks healthy in camp", CBS Sports, February 18, 2026, Camerato, Jessica, "After 2nd Tommy John surgery, vet Smith vying for spot in young Nats bullpen", MLB.com, February 18, 2026, Sallick, Sam, "Which Washington Nationals waiver claim will make the biggest impact this season?", Federal Baseball, February 20, 2026, "Washington Nationals claim left-handed pitcher Ken Waldichuk", MLB.com, February 5, 2026, and Mears, Stephen G., "The Opening Day roster is set (sort of) for the Nats", TalkNats.com, March 23, 2026.)) Reliever Paxton Schultz also landed on the injured list at the end of spring training, having been shut down after three Grapefruit League appearances with right elbow inflammation. Outfielders Dylan Crews and Jacob Young both missed a few Grapefruit League games after being hit by pitches during live batting practice.

Longtime second baseman Luis García Jr. saw much of his action at first base during spring training, with new President of Baseball Operations Paul Toboni expressing optimism about García's potential as a first baseman. The Nationals also began giving left fielder James Wood starts in right field and middle infielder Nasim Nuñez starts at third base, for the first time in their respective major league careers.

Crews was optioned to the Class-AAA Rochester Red Wings toward the end of spring training, along with swingman Mitchell Parker, marking the first minor league assignment for either player since the 2024 season. The Nationals also optioned outfielder Robert Hassell III, another former top prospect who spent much of the 2025 season in Washington, to Rochester, choosing instead to roster Joey Wiemer as their fourth outfielder.

Pérez was the only non-roster invitee to break camp with the Nationals, with other non-roster players reassigned to the minor leagues or released. The Nationals also returned Rule 5 draft pick Griff McGarry at the end of spring training. Manager Blake Butera said McGarry "wasn't quite there yet, and we just didn't have the runway to give him at the major league level".

== Regular season ==
=== Opening Day ===
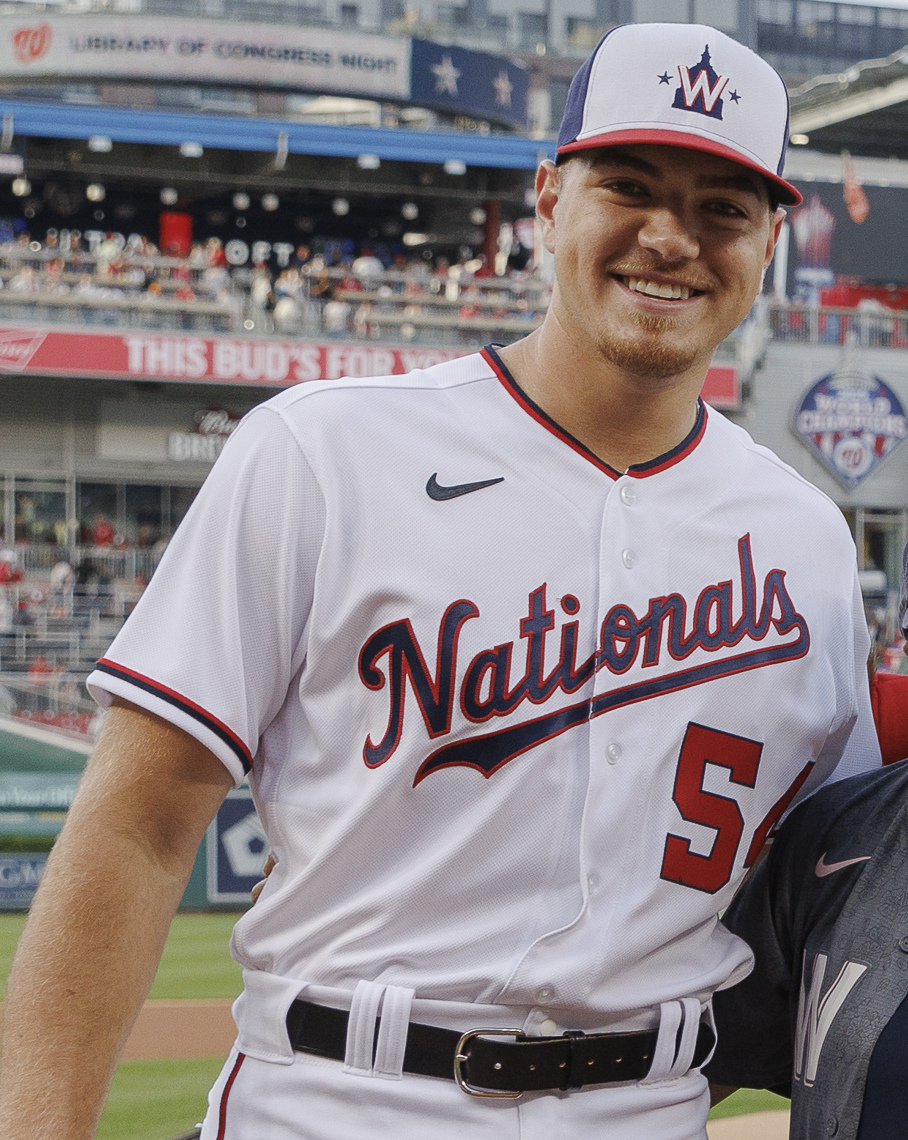
Cade Cavalli made both his first Opening Day roster and his first Opening Day start as a major league pitcher.

Right-hander Cade Cavalli, one of 10 Nationals players making his first appearance on an Opening Day roster, got the start on March 26, 2026, opposing left-hander Matthew Boyd and the Chicago Cubs at Wrigley Field.

Right fielder Joey Wiemer pulled the first hit and home run of the Nationals' season in the second inning, giving Washington the early 1–0 lead. Chicago answered back in the third inning, scoring two runs on singles by Michael Busch and Pete Crow-Armstrong. In the fourth inning, the Nationals erupted for six runs, keyed by a near-grand slam to right field by shortstop CJ Abrams that the ballpark just held on a windy day; Abrams, having watched his drive off the wall for a moment, was tagged out at second base. Three batters later, center fielder Jacob Young muscled a drive through the wind, landing in the basket along the right field wall for a two-run homer that made the score 7–2.

Although the Cubs struck back for one run in the bottom of the fourth, chasing Cavalli from the game well short of the five innings he needed to qualify for the win, the Nationals' lead held up. Second baseman Nasim Nuñez manufactured an eighth run for the Nationals in the sixth inning—walking, stealing second, advancing to third on a groundout, and scoring on a wild pitch—while Crow-Armstrong bunted in a run for his second RBI single of the game in the seventh inning, bringing home the Cubs' fourth and final run.

Third baseman Brady House launched a two-run homer in the ninth inning to give the game its final score of 10–4. (Note: With House's home run, the Nationals set a new team record for most runs scored on Opening Day. (See "With Brady House's 9th-inning home run to give the Nationals a 10-4 lead, Washington has now scored the most runs on Opening Day in team history (2005-pres)," x.com, March 26, 2026.)) Cionel Pérez retired the Cubs in order in the bottom of the ninth, striking out Crow-Armstrong to seal the win. Reliever Brad Lord was credited with the win after giving up one run, on Crow-Armstrong's bunt single, over 2 2/3 innings pitched.

Opening Day Starters
Name	Position
James Wood	Left fielder
Andrés Chaparro	First baseman
Brady House	Third baseman
Daylen Lile	Designated hitter
Joey Wiemer	Right fielder
CJ Abrams	Shortstop
Nasim Nuñez	Second baseman
Keibert Ruiz	Catcher
Jacob Young	Center fielder
Cade Cavalli	Starting pitcher

=== March/April ===
==== 1st roadtrip: Chicago and Philadelphia ====
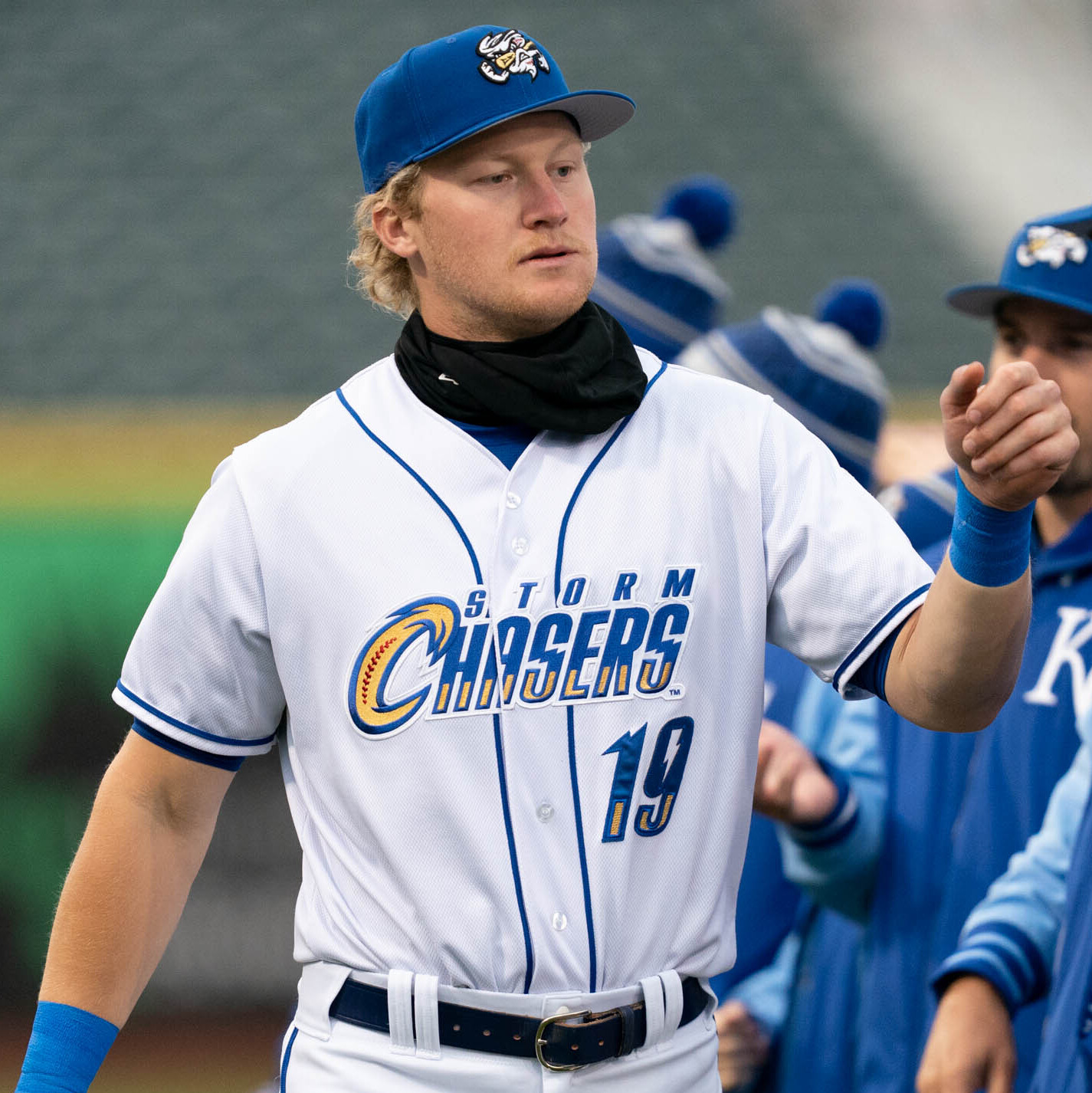
Joey Wiemer got off to a record-setting start for the Nationals, reaching base in his first 10 plate appearances with the team.

Washington began its first season under new manager Blake Butera with a series win in Chicago. After defeating the Cubs 10–4 on Opening Day, the Nationals—missing All-Star shortstop CJ Abrams due to a death in the family—were held down on March 28 by Cade Horton and the Cubs bullpen, while Nationals starter Miles Mikolas labored. After reliever Andre Granillo was taken out after 2/3 of an inning, bequeathing two runners to left-hander Ken Waldichuk, the southpaw surrendered a three-run home run to Ian Happ on his first MLB pitch since 2023. The Cubs won 10–2. The Nationals bounced back with a 6–3 victory in the March 29 rubber game, riding a solid five innings from starter Jake Irvin and a 3-for-3 performance by right fielder Joey Wiemer that included a three-run homer and a triple. The Cubs scored all three of their runs on solo homers, two off the bat of Alex Bregman along with Happ's second home run of the series.

Heading to Philadelphia for a three-game series against the division-rival Phillies, the Nationals made a roster move, optioning first baseman Andrés Chaparro and adding newly acquired utility player and former top prospect Curtis Mead to the roster. By singling in his first two plate appearances in a 13–2 win over Philadelphia on March 30, Wiemer tied a major league record for most consecutive plate appearances reaching base to begin the season (Note: The record of 10 was set by Carlos Delgado with the 2002 Toronto Blue Jays. (See Snyder, Matt, "Joey Wiemer ties Carlos Delgado's record by reaching base safely in first 10 plate appearances of MLB season", CBS Sports, March 30, 2026.)) and set a new major league record for consecutive plate appearances reaching base to begin his tenure with a team. (Note: The previous record of eight was held by Steve Henderson with the 1983 Seattle Mariners and Jeremy Hazelbaker with the 2017 Arizona Diamondbacks. (See Camerato, Jessica, "Wiemer kicks off his Nats career by making franchise history", MLB.com, March 29, 2026, and Zuckerman, Mark, "Officially, Joey Wiemer has reached base 9 straight times to start the season thanks to a successful challenge by the Nats," x.com, March 30, 2026.)) Foster Griffin earned the win in his first career start, as well as his first MLB appearance since 2022. The Phillies struck back to win the next two games, including a comeback from a late 5–1 deficit on April 1. With Philadelphia down to their last strike, Edmundo Sosa singled in a pair of runs to tie the game in the bottom of the ninth off reliever Cole Henry, before rookie Justin Crawford walked off Henry and the Nationals in the tenth inning.

==== 1st homestand: Los Angeles and St. Louis ====
Coming off a 3–3 roadtrip, the Nationals opened their home schedule on April 2 with their first of three straight losses to the two-time defending champion Los Angeles Dodgers, who dealt Washington a sweep. Mikolas set a new team record for runs allowed by a pitcher, also a personal worst, of 11. (Note: The previous team record of 10 runs allowed in an outing was held jointly by six pitchers: Patrick Corbin, A. J. Cole, Gio González, Jeremy Guthrie, Joe Ross and Jason Simontacchi. Mikolas had also previously allowed 10 runs thrice in his career, most recently for the St. Louis Cardinals in 2022. (See Zuckerman, Mark, "A potentially uplifting day spoiled by one disastrous start", Nats Journal, April 3, 2026, and Camerato, Jessica, "'I didn't do my job': Mikolas gets hit hard in Nats' home-opener loss", MLB.com, April 3, 2026.)) Irvin fared little better in the second game of the series, allowing six runs and taking the loss. The Nationals roared out to a five-run lead on April 5, with Griffin pitching five innings of one run and first baseman Luis García Jr. and right fielder James Wood homering off Los Angeles starter Roki Sasaki, only for the bullpen to falter in an echo of the April 1 series finale against Philadelphia, leading to an 8–6 loss.

The Nationals were able to flip the script as they hosted the St. Louis Cardinals on April 6. Although Waldichuk and Granillo gave up the lead in relief of Zack Littell—who gave up a single run in five innings in a strong first start for Washington—Wood hit his second three-run home run in as many games to level the score in the eighth inning, followed by homers by third baseman Brady House and the shortstop Abrams to put the home team ahead for good in its first win of the year at Nationals Park, 9–6. That proved to be the Nationals' only win of the homestand. Although they optioned Granillo and activated Paxton Schultz as a fresh arm in the bullpen after his poor performance in the series opener, a third consecutive late collapse by the bullpen handed St. Louis the win on April 7, despite an effective five innings from staff ace Cade Cavalli, another Wood homer, and a three-hit game for Mead that included his first home run as a National. Three wobbly innings from Mikolas against his former team and a feeble offensive effort by the Nationals led to the Cardinals capturing the rubber game, capping a frustrating 1–6 homestand for the Nationals.

==== 2nd roadtrip: Milwaukee and Pittsburgh ====
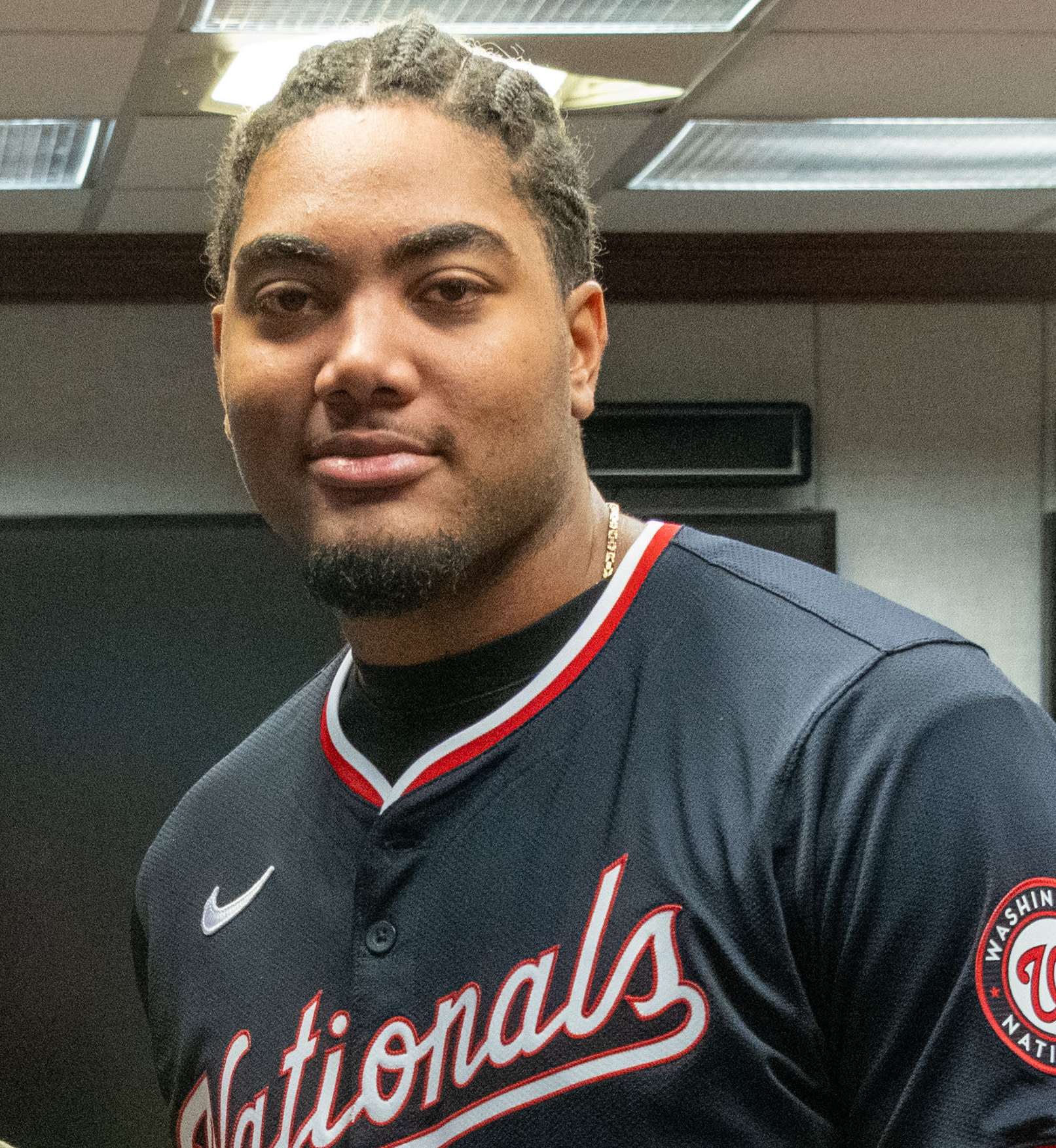
James Wood was honored as National League Player of the Week on April 13.

Back on the road, the Nationals dealt the Milwaukee Brewers a sweep over three games at American Family Field. Irvin gave up a three-run homer to Jake Bauers in the top of the first inning on April 10, but he straightened out to pitch four more scoreless innings after that, keeping his team in the game until they rallied in the ninth, using three bunt singles to help pin a loss on Brewers closer Trevor Megill. In the next game, the Nationals held the Brewers to two hits in a low-scoring affair. Starting for the visitors, Griffin carried a no-hitter into the sixth inning, while Wood and catcher Keibert Ruiz's RBI doubles supplied Washington with all they needed to beat the Brewers on April 11. The Nationals completed the sweep in a seesaw contest on April 12. Both teams traded scores, with the Nationals ultimately coming through with the game-winner on a two-run single by Ruiz in the eighth inning to beat Milwaukee despite four home runs by the home team. Butera got creative with his bullpen usage after losing Waldichuk, who entered in relief of Littell, to an apparent arm injury midway through an at-bat, then watching Henry give up a game-tying three-run homer to Gary Sánchez. With left-hander PJ Poulin providing a bridge to the ninth inning, Gus Varland converted his first career save to seal the Nationals' first sweep in Milwaukee since the 2006 season. Wood both homered and stole home in the game, the first National in team history to do so in a single game. He was named National League Player of the Week, having gone 12-for-22 over six games with three home runs and eight runs batted in.

Both Henry and Waldichuk were placed on the injured list before the Nationals opened a four-game series visiting the Pittsburgh Pirates at PNC Park on April 13. Right-handers Orlando Ribalta and Jackson Rutledge were recalled from Class-AAA Rochester to replace them on the active roster. While Henry was diagnosed with a right rotator cuff strain, Waldichuk's injury was more serious: a tear of his left ulnar collateral ligament, requiring him to undergo his second career Tommy John surgery and ending his season. Rutledge was roughed up in the first game of the series, allowing seven earned runs in relief after Cavalli couldn't make it out of the second inning, and was optioned back immediately afterward. Pittsburgh starter Paul Skenes earned the win with a dominant performance, allowing just a solo shot by Abrams through six innings of one-hit, one-run baseball. While the Nationals rallied against the Pirates bullpen to make it a 16–5 final, they couldn't recover from the 10-run sixth inning that included Rutledge's meltdown. With Rutledge down and lefty swingman Mitchell Parker recalled the next day, Butera employed an unorthodox pitching strategy: Poulin opened for Mikolas, who then handed the ball off to Parker and the rest of the bullpen after a shaky 3 1/3 innings. The bullpen held a 5–4 lead the rest of the way, with Varland closing it out for his second save. Washington suffered its first shutout of the season on April 15, with Carmen Mlodzinski shutting them down over six innings in relief to outduel Irvin, 2–0. The series finale went back and forth. After four scoreless innings apiece by Griffin and Pittsburgh's Braxton Ashcraft, Washington broke through in the top of the fifth, as Pirates rookie shortstop Konnor Griffin fielded a routine García grounder and unsuccessfully attempted to force out a hustling Nasim Nuñez at second base, then spiked his relay throw to first, allowing three runs to score. The Pirates immediately struck back with a four-hit frame, keyed by Marcell Ozuna's three-run homer off the left field foul pole. The back-and-forth scoring continued for several more innings before the Pirates, down to their last strike versus Clayton Beeter in the bottom of the ninth, tied the game on a Brandon Lowe comebacker that deflected off Beeter's outstretched glove. Wood delivered a two-out RBI single to score the automatic runner in the top of the tenth, before Ribalta shut down the Pirates for his first career save, sealing the Nationals' first extra-innings win of 2026.

==== 2nd homestand: San Francisco and Atlanta ====
Returning to Washington, D.C., to host the San Francisco Giants, the Nationals reshuffled their bullpen, optioning Ribalta to add newly reacquired reliever Richard Lovelady to the staff. The Giants dominated the first game of the series on April 17, scoring eight times against the Washington starter Littell over four innings in a 10–5 contest. The Nationals blew an early four-run lead on April 18, with a series of errors, mental miscues, and poor at-bats in high-pressure moments dooming them to a 12-inning loss. In separate moments, Mead failed to slide and ran into a ninth inning-ending out at third base, while representing the winning run; Nuñez swung and missed a full-count pitch way out of the zone, which would have forced in the winning run in the tenth; and third baseman Jorbit Vivas slowed up before hitting the first base bag on a close play, apparently thinking the runner ahead of him would be forced out at second, ending the tenth without Wiemer's dash home counting for a run. Butera expressed frustration with his team's play after the game and said the mistakes would be addressed before the series finale. With the struggling Mikolas scheduled to start the April 19 game, the Nationals optioned Schultz and called up left-handed starting pitcher Andrew Alvarez. Poulin collected the first two outs as the home team's opener, before Mikolas took over and pitched 3 2/3 scoreless innings, then Alvarez came on for the last 4 1/3 innings. Ruiz and Mead supplied the offense with a double and a home run respectively, both in the fifth inning, and the Nationals shut out the Giants, 3–0.

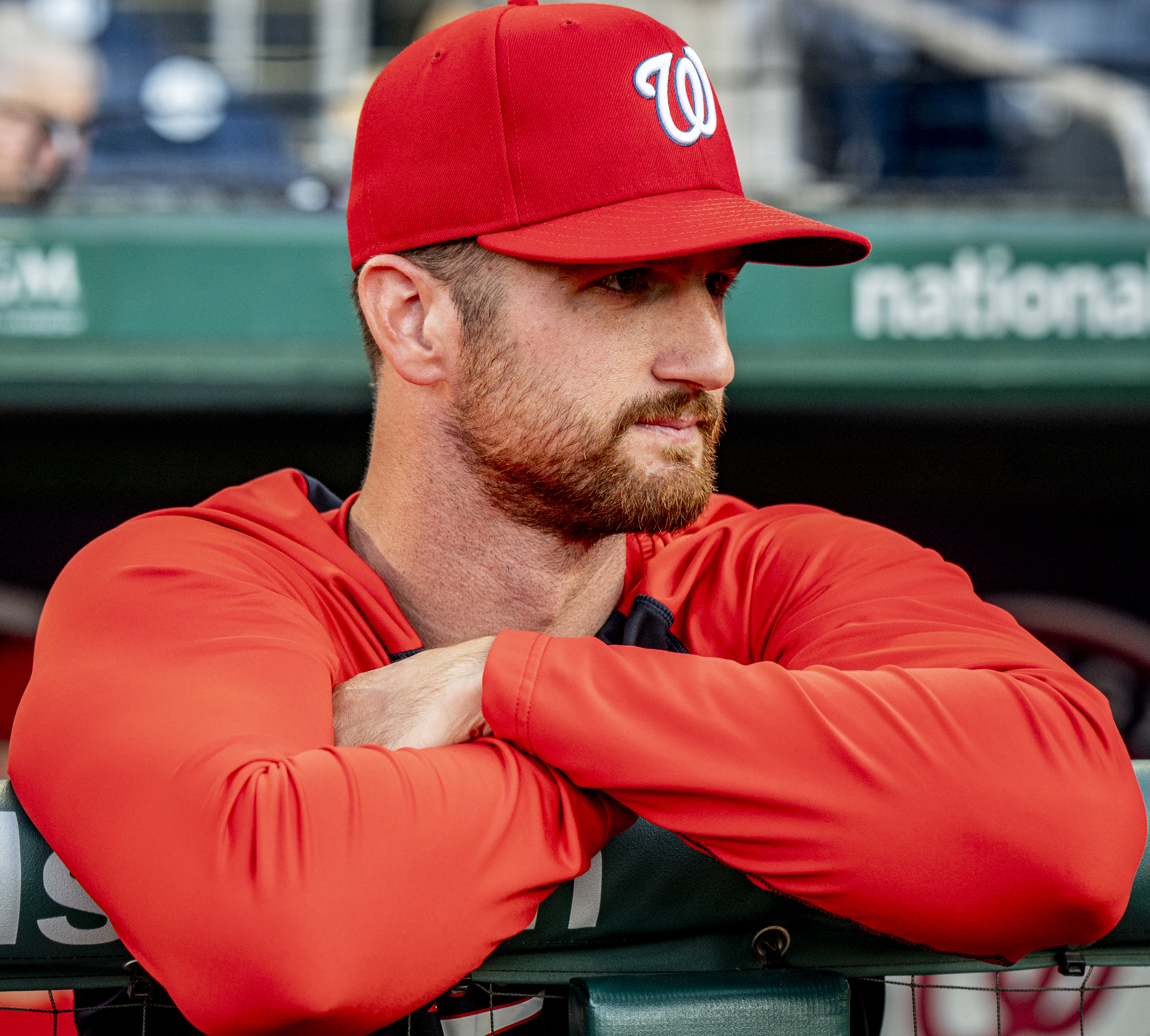
Foster Griffin completed six innings for a quality start on April 21 after persuading manager Blake Butera to keep him in the game.

The Nationals optioned Alvarez and recalled reliever Julián Fernández for a four-game series with the division-rival Atlanta Braves at Nationals Park. Irvin pitched well for five innings in the series opener on April 20, but defensive miscues, a hit-by-pitch, and a poor outing by Poulin in relief of Irvin gave the Braves a sixth-inning lead they would not relinquish. Griffin turned in a quality start on April 21, backed by offensive output, to earn the win in an 11–4 game in which his opposite number, former National Reynaldo López, only completed one inning. Butera made a mound visit with two outs in the sixth inning but was persuaded to leave Griffin in to complete the inning, which Griffin did by retiring Mauricio Dubón. The Nationals could not overcome another poor start by Littell on April 22. Neither a four-run outburst keyed by left fielder Daylen Lile's three-run homer in the first inning, nor a rally in the sixth inning as Wiemer and Wood hit back-to-back homers, were enough after their starter allowed eight runs. The Nationals fell, 8–6. In the series finale, Wood homered on the very first pitch thrown by debuting Atlanta starter JR Ritchie, but Ritchie buckled down to pitch seven strong innings, allowing only one more run—on another solo shot by Abrams—the rest of the way. Cavalli pitched into the sixth, also giving up just a pair of runs, but the Braves broke through in the seventh against relievers Cionel Pérez and Varland and ran away with a 7–2 win to take the four-game series.

==== 3rd roadtrip: Chicago and New York ====
After giving up three runs in three appearances for the Nationals during the Braves series, Fernández was optioned back to Class-AAA Rochester. The Nationals recalled right-handed starter Riley Cornelio for his major league debut on April 24 at Rate Field. Facing the Chicago White Sox, Butera followed a familiar pitching strategy he had used for Mikolas' previous turn in the rotation against San Francisco: Poulin opening, Mikolas pitching as the bulk reliever, and Cornelio handling the late game. However, Cornelio immediately struggled to locate pitches and committed a throwing error on his first fielding attempt, turning a one-run lead into a one-run deficit in the seventh inning. House leveled the game with a leadoff home run in the top of the eighth, but Cornelio labored again in his second inning, giving up the go-ahead run for a second time and ultimately taking the loss, 5–4. Cornelio was optioned after the game. The Nationals won the next two games in the series in extra innings, buoyed by shutout performances from their starting pitchers. With a short bullpen, Irvin pitched into the sixth inning without allowing a run April 25, striking out nine. While the White Sox leveled the game in the eighth inning, Washington erupted for four runs in the top of the tenth to win. Granillo and Schultz rejoined the team on April 26, as Beeter landed on the injured list with forearm soreness and Chaparro, recalled for a single game the previous day, was optioned back to Rochester. Griffin pitched seven scoreless innings in the rubber game, with neither team scoring until the tenth inning. The Nationals scored two on an Abrams sac fly and a pinch-hit home run by José Tena. Schultz recorded his first career save, allowing the automatic runner to score but striking out the last two Chicago batters to secure victory.

The Nationals concluded the first full month of the season by taking two of three on the road from the division-rival New York Mets. They were shut out in their first game at Citi Field on April 28, as Littell gave up eight runs for his third straight start. The offense came alive again April 29 to back a strong six innings by Cavalli, as House hit his first career grand slam and Mead tapped out four hits including a home run. The Nationals won, 14–2. The Nationals captured a back-and-forth rubber game on April 30, 5–4, with Abrams delivering a two-run homer in the eighth to retake the lead for good.

Washington finished April with a record of 15–17, two games under .500 and third place in the National League East Division.

=== May ===
==== 3rd homestand: Milwaukee and Minnesota ====
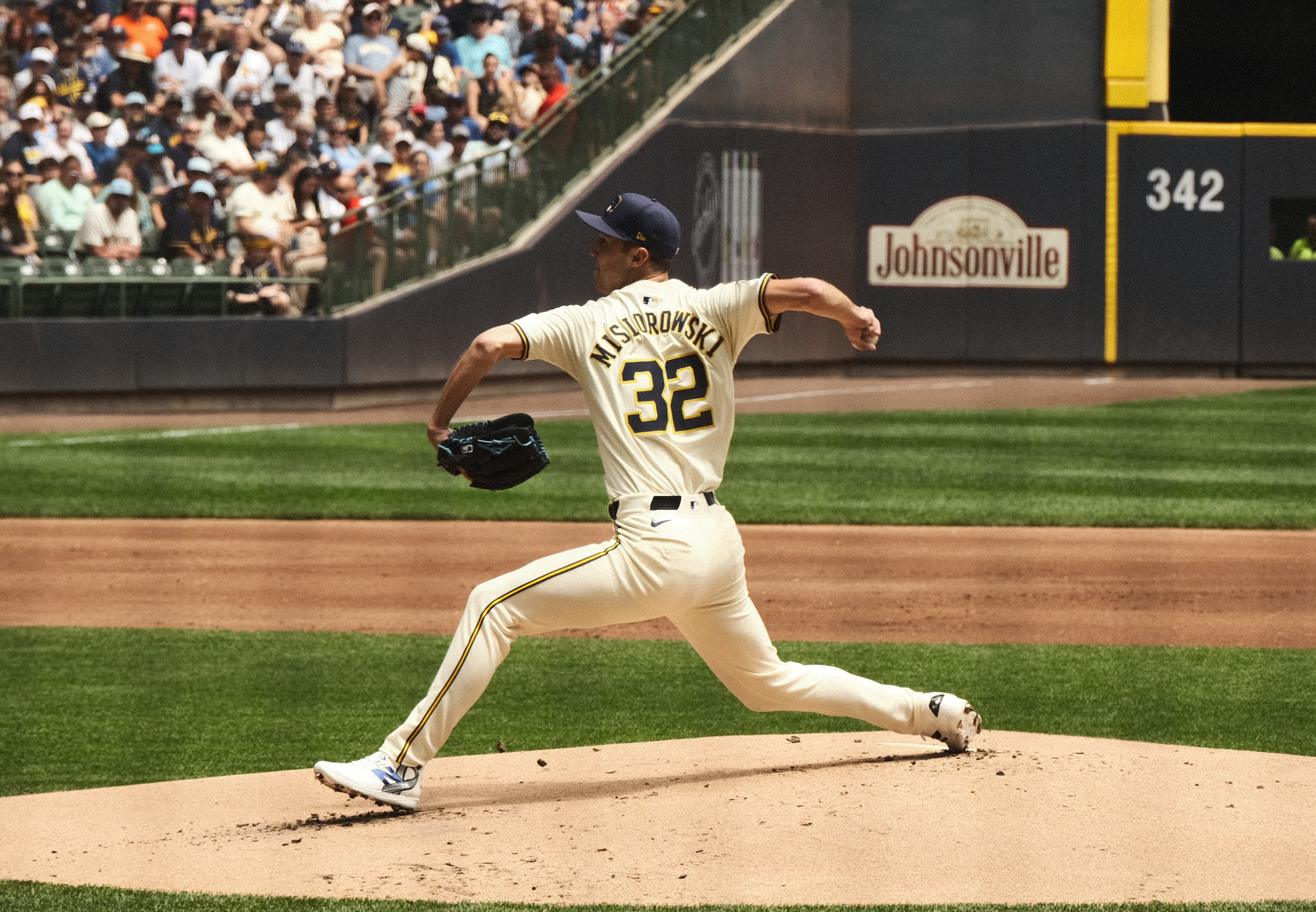
Jacob Misiorowski of the Milwaukee Brewers' bid for a no-hitter against Washington on May 2 ended prematurely when he suffered an injury in the sixth inning.

The Nationals' offense was quiet to open May, losing back-to-back games on May 1 and May 2 in which they could only score one run against the visiting Milwaukee Brewers. Flamethrower Jacob Misiorowski no-hit the Nationals into the sixth inning in the series opener before exiting with a leg injury. Foster Griffin pitched six quality innings for Washington in the second game, but three unearned runs that scored in the first inning after an error by third baseman Brady House saddled him with the loss. Left-hander Cionel Pérez provided two innings in relief of Jake Irvin on May 1 before the Nationals outrighted him from the roster May 2, recalling right-handed reliever Orlando Ribalta and claiming righty Zak Kent to fill Pérez's spots on the active and 40-man rosters, respectively. Lefty opener PJ Poulin handed off to struggling starter Zack Littell after two innings May 3, and Littell responded with 3 2/3 innings of one-run ball to earn the win, 3–2. Richard Lovelady picked up his first save for the Nationals.

After an off day, the Nationals were flat in their May 5 series opener against the Minnesota Twins. Staff ace Cade Cavalli was inefficient for Washington, needing 40 pitches in the fourth inning alone. After he allowed four runs to ice the 11–3 loss, struggling reliever Andre Granillo was optioned to Class-AAA Rochester in favor of the newly acquired Kent, with the Nationals also designating former first-round draft pick Jackson Rutledge for assignment to clear a 40-man roster spot for newly signed but injured pitcher Max Kranick. Despite not pitching with an opener, veteran starter Miles Mikolas was able to pitch into the sixth inning and earn his first win of the season as the Nationals teed off on Minnesota on May 6. Shortstop CJ Abrams put an exclamation point on the 15–2 blowout with an eighth-inning grand slam, while Mikolas, lefty Mitchell Parker, and Kent held the Twins to three hits. The Nationals chalked up their first series win at home as a closely fought rubber game fell their way, 7–5. Catcher Keibert Ruiz was the offensive star for Washington, notching three hits—two of them go-ahead hits, including a seventh-inning home run that put the Nationals on top for good—before closer Gus Varland locked down a four-out save.

==== 4th roadtrip: Miami and Cincinnati ====
The Nationals started off a new roadtrip by winning a pitchers' duel over the division Miami Marlins at loanDepot Park, 3–2, on May 8. Both teams did all of their scoring in the first inning, with the Nationals pinning a loss on rookie starter Robby Snelling in his major league debut. Poulin earned his first save of the season after Abrams bobbled a two-out grounder to shortstop in the bottom of the ninth inning, prompting manager Blake Butera to lift his long reliever Brad Lord in favor of the lefty. The Marlins took advantage of poor Nationals defense and late bullpen collapses in the next two games to capture a series win, as two of the Nationals' most trusted relievers took the loss: Parker on May 9 and Varland on May 10.

Washington took two of three from the Cincinnati Reds at the Great American Ball Park. They won the series opener on May 12 behind two-homer games from first baseman Luis García Jr. and left fielder Daylen Lile, playing for the first time in front of friends and family in the major league city nearest his hometown of Louisville, Kentucky. Cincinnati jumped out to an early five-run lead, including a grand slam by Tyler Stephenson, against the Nationals starter Irvin on May 13, but Washington rallied to tie the game in the second inning. A procession of relievers worked out of trouble in the late innings to force extra innings, before Lile hit a two-run home run in the tenth inning. The Reds nearly equalized in the bottom of the tenth when first baseman Spencer Steer's drive to the wall off Poulin was caught by a fan, but the umpiring crew ruled it a double on fan interference. With just one run counting, Poulin locked down the save, with the final score 8–7. The Nationals offense was never able to find its groove against Reds ace Chase Burns in the series finale on May 14, while Griffin struggled to his worst start of the season to date, giving up nine runs. After 2 2/3 innings of bulk work out of the bullpen by Kent, outfielder Joey Wiemer was called upon to pitch the eighth inning—with the game by then out of hand—and the Reds ultimately won 15–1.

==== 4th homestand: Baltimore and New York ====
Returning to Nationals Park for the Beltway Series against the Baltimore Orioles, the Nationals optioned Kent to Rochester and recalled left-hander Andrew Alvarez to piggyback Littell on May 15. Littell and Alvarez combined for eight scoreless innings, although two runs were charged to Alvarez in the ninth inning before Lovelady slammed the door shut. Lile kept his hot streak going, with his sixth-inning home run proving the difference in the 3–2 win. Benefiting from six scoreless innings from Cavalli before the Orioles hit back-to-back home runs that cut an early Washington lead to one run in the seventh inning on May 16, the Nationals responded with an offensive outburst that blew the game open. Ruiz again led the attack for the Nationals on May 16, falling a triple shy of the cycle while driving in a career-high five runs. With the 13–3 victory, the Nationals briefly returned to the .500 mark, with 23 wins and 23 losses at that point in the season. (Note: Prior to Washington achieving a .500 record on May 16, the most recent latest point in a season the team did not have a losing record was July 2, 2021. (See "Back at .500, Nationals go for 3-game sweep of Orioles", CBS Sports, May 17, 2026.)) Baltimore jumped out to an early lead on May 17 and never relinquished it. Shortstop Gunnar Henderson hit a first-inning home run off Lovelady, opening for Mikolas, and third baseman Coby Mayo greeted Mikolas with a two-run homer in the second inning. Although Mikolas was able to carry the Nationals through the seventh inning, the Nationals were unable to make up the four-run deficit, falling 7–3 and dropping back below .500. The game's fourth-inning "Salute to Service" was briefly disrupted by three individuals who unfurled a white nationalist banner in the upper deck. The Nationals released a statement after the game condemning "discriminatory and hateful rhetoric" and confirmed at least one person had been identified and banned from Nationals Park over the display.

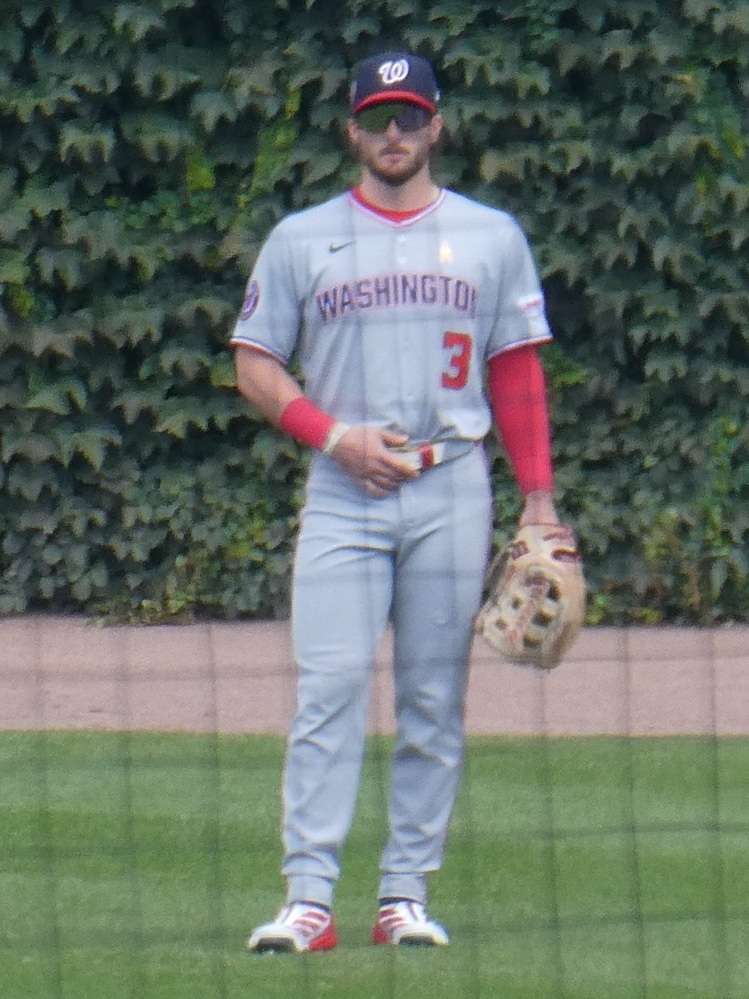
After beginning the year in the minor leagues, former top prospect Dylan Crews was recalled for his season debut May 19.

The Nationals hosted the division-rival New York Mets for a four-game set, which the two teams split. New York took the first game in twelve innings, erupting for ten runs in the final inning. (Note: No team in the National League had previously scored ten runs in an extra inning since the implementation of the ghost runner rule, or for more than a century prior. The last NL team to score ten runs in an extra inning was the 1919 Cincinnati Reds against the Brooklyn Dodgers. (See "Surging Mets produce 10-run 12th inning in win over Nationals", ESPN, May 19, 2026.)) The damage was done against both reliever Paxton Schultz and position player Jorbit Vivas—whom Nationals manager Blake Butera called upon to pitch after the Mets scored five runs against the laboring Schultz, pitching for a third consecutive day, which the umpiring crew attempted to disallow based on a misinterpretation of the rules before being overruled by the replay center. Outfielders Jacob Young and Joey Wiemer, who entered the game to replace Young, were both injured when hit by pitches during the contest, although they avoided serious injury. Wiemer and third baseman Brady House were optioned to Rochester after the game, as the Nationals recalled outfielder Dylan Crews and first baseman Andrés Chaparro in a major shakeup. The Nationals romped to a 14–2 win on May 19, scoring nine times against Mets rookie starter Nolan McLean, including an inside-the-park grand slam by James Wood (Note: Wood's was the first inside-the-park grand slam in MLB since Raimel Tapia for the Toronto Blue Jays in July 2022, against the Boston Red Sox. (See Carniel, Guadelupe, "James Wood’s rare grand slam proved one mistake can change MLB", HITC, May 20, 2026.)) that deflected off left fielder Nick Morabito's glove in Morabito's major league debut. Alvarez finished the game, pitching four innings to earn his first major league save despite the lopsided score. (Note: Alvarez's four-inning save was the longest in team history, surpassing the previous record of 3 2/3 innings set by Mitchell Parker in September 2025. (See "Andrew Alvarez's 4.0-inning save is the longest save in Nationals history (2005-pres.), surpassing Mitchell Parker's 3.2-inning save at New York (NL) on Sept. 21, 2025," x.com, May 20, 2026.)) The Nationals roughed up another Met making his major league debut, left-handed starting pitcher Zach Thornton, on May 20. After giving up a first-inning home run to shortstop CJ Abrams, Thornton took the loss, with Washington cruising to an 8–4 victory. The Nationals made a change in their bullpen, optioning Poulin and activating right-handed Clayton Beeter, before the May 21 series finale, in which Mets starter David Peterson was able to put the Nationals' hot bats on ice, outdueling Cavalli in a 2–1 game and forcing Washington to settle for a series split.

==== 5th roadtrip: Atlanta and Cleveland ====
The Nationals continued division play with three games at Truist Park against the MLB-leading Atlanta Braves, dropping the first game before winning the next two to capture the series. Despite a strong effort from Lovelady, working as their opener, and Mikolas, who pitched five scoreless innings in relief, the Nationals fell in the eleventh inning on May 22. Braves backup catcher Chadwick Tromp notched two RBI hits in extra innings, including the walkoff single, as Ribalta in the tenth and then Schultz in the eleventh couldn't keep Atlanta off the board. Washington responded by holding the Braves to just one hit, a seventh-inning single by Michael Harris II off Lord that just eluded a leaping Abrams' glove, in a 2–0 shutout on May 23. Irvin led the way for the visitors, striking out seven Braves over six innings, but he departed the game with a shoulder injury after just one warmup pitch in the seventh. The Nationals placed Irvin on the 15-day injured list with a right shoulder strain and recalled Poulin before the series finale on May 24, giving them a temporarily expanded bullpen, although Irvin and team officials expressed optimism that Irvin wouldn't miss more than the minimum. The May 24 game was sloppy at times, with two rain delays that included an 88-minute break midway through the seventh inning and resulted in slippery, muddy on-field conditions. Griffin delivered six scoreless innings before the rain delay, with second baseman Nasim Nuñez driving in the only run before the rains came. Pinch-hitter Luis García Jr. tacked on an insurance run after play resumed, before Butera had to call on three relievers—Varland, Lovelady, and Ribalta—to get through the ninth inning. Nuñez booted a potential double-play ball that could have sealed a save for Lovelady, but with the bases loaded and the Nationals clinging to a 2–1 lead, Ribalta came on and retired Tromp and designated hitter Ronald Acuña Jr. to lock it down.

The Nationals visited Progressive Field for three games with the Cleveland Guardians. Australians Curtis Mead of the Nationals and Travis Bazzana of the Guardians started all three games in their respective teams' lineups, marking the first time since the 2011 season that Australian players had started on opposing teams. (Note: Prior to Mead and Bazzana, the last Australians to start in opposing lineups were Luke Hughes for the Minnesota Twins and Trent Oeltjen for the Los Angeles Dodgers in June 2011. (See Palatella, Henry, "Dressed for Bazzana, Guardians fan gets souvenir from different Aussie", MLB.com, May 25, 2026.)) Mead homered twice to lead the Nationals on May 25, as the visitors scored ten runs including six homers to improve to a winning record for the first time since July 1, 2021. Coming into the game after two innings of one-run ball by Poulin, erstwhile starter Zack Littell pitched a season-high seven innings, allowing one more run to score. The Nationals won again on May 26. Ace Cade Cavalli delivered six quality innings, while the Nationals chased his opposing number Joey Cantillo from the game after just two innings. What would have been Mead's third homer of the series was pulled back from over the wall in straightaway center field by Cleveland center fielder Daniel Schneemann, but the rest of the lineup produced six runs, including a ninth-inning two-run single by first baseman Andrés Chaparro to give Mitchell Parker some cushion. Parker earned his first save of the season with a three-inning performance, the second time in as many games the Nationals used just two pitchers to complete nine innings. Guardians ace Gavin Williams mostly stymied the Nationals' hot offense for seven innings in the series finale, and MLB saves leader Cade Smith gave up a run but was able to shut down the Nationals' rally in the ninth to seal a 3–2 finish.

==== 5th homestand (part 1): San Diego ====
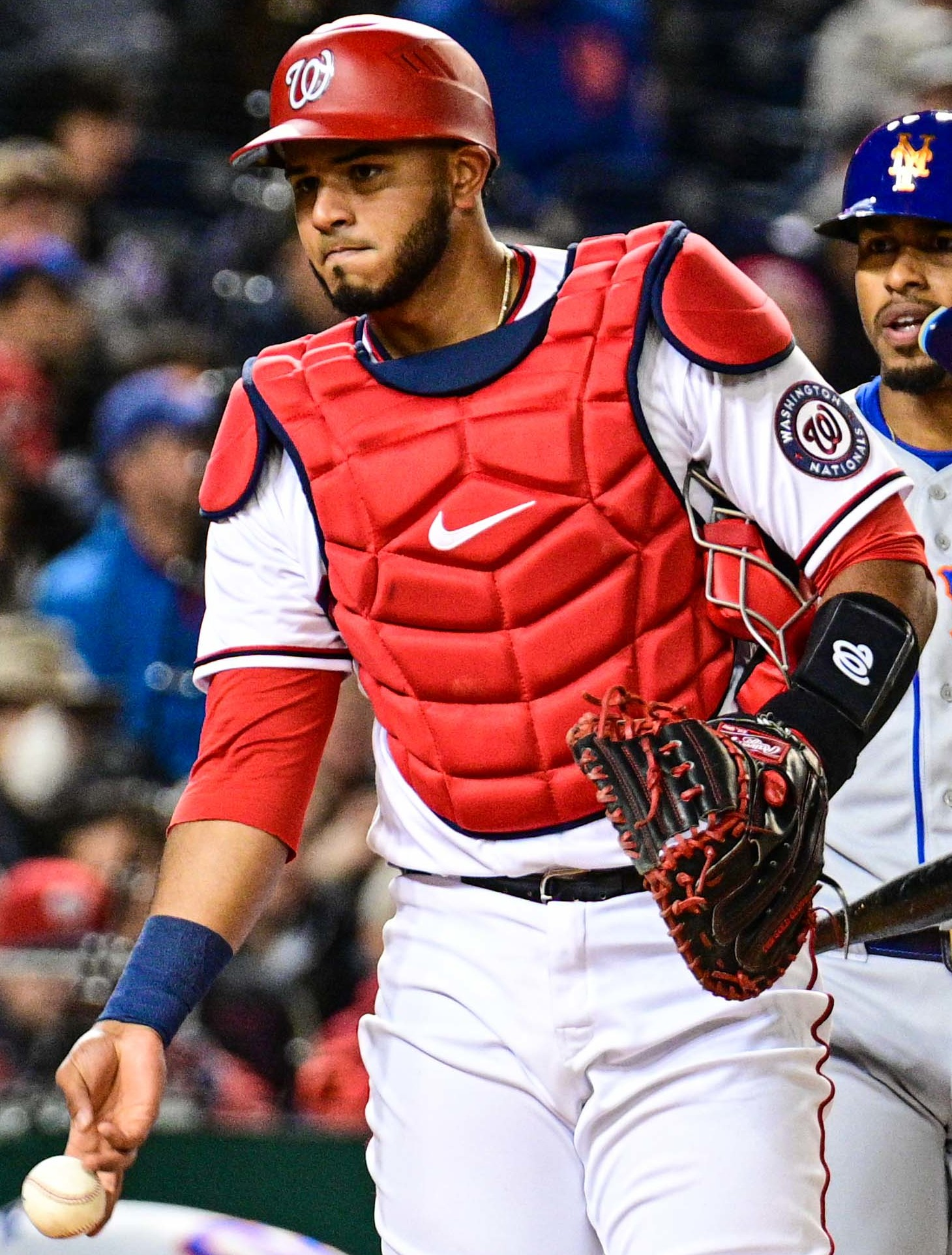
Keibert Ruiz threw out three baserunners attempting to steal second on May 31, the third of which ended the game.

Returning to Nationals Park after a day off, the Nationals won their third straight series despite dropping the first game to the San Diego Padres on May 29. Alvarez, originally announced as the starter in place of the injured Irvin, ended up pitching behind Schultz. Working as the opener, Schultz's May difficulties continued as he gave up an early run. Struggling with diminished command and velocity, Alvarez struck out just one Padre while giving up three more runs, erasing an early Nationals lead that had been built by Mead and Ruiz home runs. Parker also struggled in relief of Alvarez, also allowing three runs. Batting with the bases loaded and two outs against Padres closer Mason Miller in the eighth inning, García lined out hard to left fielder Ramón Laureano, ending the Nationals' best chance to come back in the 7–5 loss. Starting for Washington on May 30, Griffin gave up three runs, all on solo home runs—including Padres right fielder Fernando Tatís Jr.'s first of the season after an MLB-leading streak of 238 plate appearances without a homer. San Diego starter Michael King cruised through six innings, allowing just one run on a solo shot by Drew Millas, but immediately ran into problems in the seventh, loading the bases and then hitting Crews in the hand with his next and final pitch of the game. Reliever Bradgley Rodríguez was victimized by a missed tag of second base by shortstop Xander Bogaerts on a game-tying fielder's choice groundball by Millas, a play that longtime Nationals pitcher and San Diego manager Craig Stammen unsuccessfully challenged and was ultimately ejected while trying to argue. Rodríguez then walked Mead to force in the go-ahead run, with García and Lile batting in three more to cap a six-run inning. Mead added two more RBIs in the eighth inning before Beeter locked down his first save since coming off the injured list. The Nationals won the May 31 series finale behind a strong performance by Littell, who pitched six scoreless innings before allowing two runs in the seventh inning, and line-drive home runs by García and Wood. Beeter picked up the save for the second straight day, as Ruiz threw out Padres center fielder Jackson Merrill on a stolen-base attempt to end the game, the Nationals catcher's team-record third caught stealing of the game. (Note: Ruiz was the first catcher in team history to catch three runners attempting to steal in a nine-inning game. Brian Schneider previously accomplished the feat of three caught stealing in a 14-inning game against the Cincinnati Reds in May 2005. (See Sallick, Sam, "The battery of Keibert Ruiz and Zack Littell shines as the Nationals finish May two games over .500", Federal Baseball, May 31, 2026.))

After going 16–12 in May, the Nationals finished the month two games over .500 and in sole possession of second place in the National League East Division.

=== June ===
==== 5th homestand (part 2): Miami ====
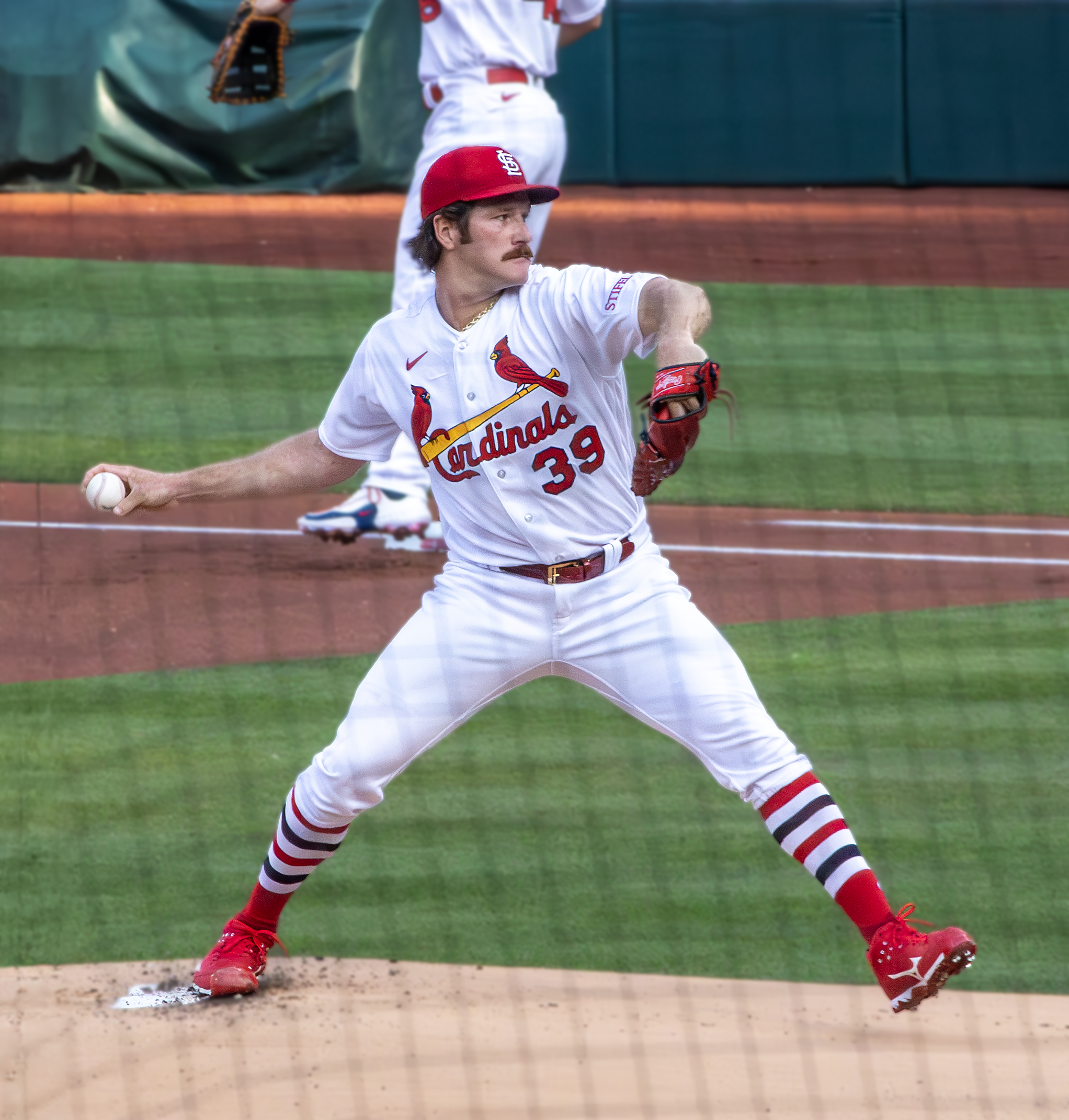
Miles Mikolas gave up home runs to three consecutive batters June 2, amid a series sweep by the division-rival Miami Marlins.

The Washington Nationals fell back below .500 as they suffered a three-game sweep at the hands of the division-rival Miami Marlins at Nationals Park to begin June. In the first game on June 1, Nationals ace Cade Cavalli gave up a run in a shaky first inning, but he straightened out to pitch four more innings before allowing another run. After Cavalli allowed a leadoff single in the sixth inning, manager Blake Butera called on left-hander Richard Lovelady to relieve him, but Lovelady immediately gave up a two-run home run to pinch-hitter Heriberto Hernández that erased the lead and ultimately took the loss. Lovelady was tapped to open for veteran right-hander Miles Mikolas on June 2. Despite needing a season-high 41 pitches to get through the first two innings, Lovelady handed off a scoreless game to Mikolas. The Marlins' combined pitching staff held the Nationals hitless through the first five innings, while Mikolas gave up back-to-back-to-back home runs in the fifth. The home team fought their way back into the game, trailing by just one run entering the ninth inning, before the Marlins scored three more runs off lefty reliever Mitchell Parker to put it out of reach. For Miami, Hernández homered twice more in the game. The Marlins once again broke open a tight game late on June 3 to clinch the sweep. Although Nationals southpaw Andrew Alvarez was effective for 4 2/3 innings in his first start of the season, the Marlins broke through for three runs in the last two innings of the game against Washington relievers Clayton Beeter and Gus Varland to win, 4–1. The Nationals were held to three hits in the series finale by Miami ace Max Meyer and the Marlins bullpen.

==== 6th roadtrip: Arizona and San Francisco ====
Heading out west after a frustrating end to their homestand, the Nationals proceeded to win the first two games of their three-game series against the Arizona Diamondbacks at Chase Field. The first game on June 5 quickly got out of hand for the home team, with first baseman Luis García Jr. hitting two homers including his first career grand slam to lead a 14-run attack by the Nationals. Arizona turned to a position player, infielder Adrian Del Castillo, to finish the game on the mound and spare the rest of the bullpen. Zack Littell won his fifth decision in a row for the Nationals on June 6. Third baseman Curtis Mead slugged a two-run homer in the first inning, and the Nationals never looked back from there, holding the Diamondbacks to just one run on two hits. Reliever Brad Lord earned his first career save, pitching two scoreless innings to finish the game. The Diamondbacks turned it back around in the series finale, limiting Washington to a single run as former National Michael Soroka stumped his former team. Arizona got to Nationals starter Cade Cavalli and long reliever Riley Cornelio, summoned that day in place of the optioned Cole Henry, for a combined five runs, although Cornelio twice worked out of jams while limiting the damage to a single run in the seventh inning.

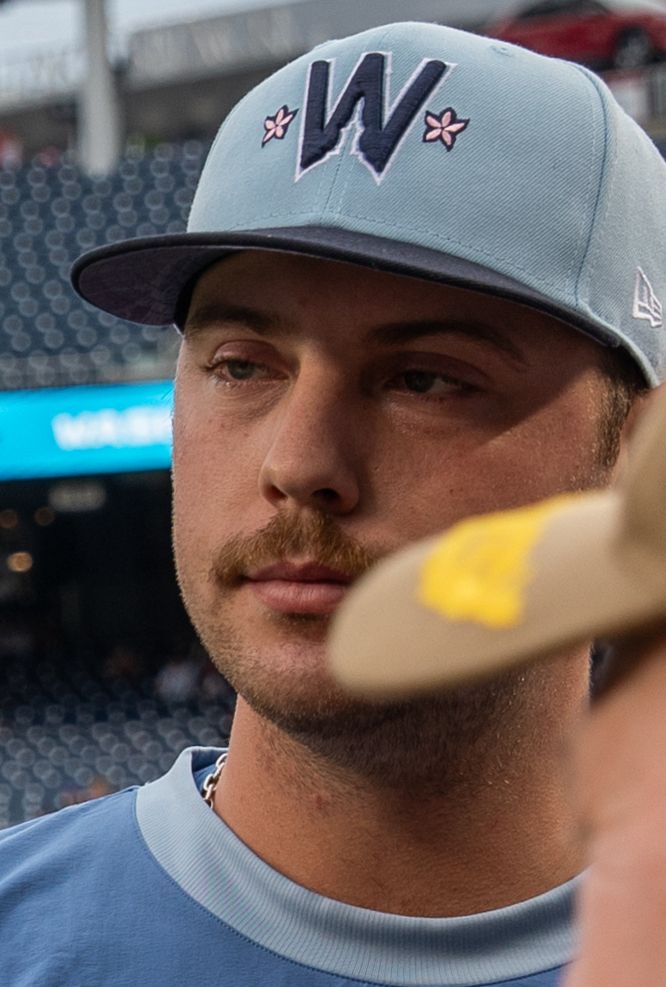
Reliever Mitchell Parker gave up an "ultimate grand slam" at Oracle Park on June 10, ending the Nationals' bid for a series sweep.

The Nationals repeated the formula at Oracle Park against the San Francisco Giants, defeating them in the first two games before losing the series finale. Trailing by two runs, the Nationals came from behind in the ninth inning to win for the first time in the season on June 8, rallying for three runs off the bats of shortstop CJ Abrams and left fielder Daylen Lile against Giants closer Keaton Winn after being held to a single run over eight innings by Logan Webb. On June 9, the Nationals pitched out of trouble in nearly every inning on their way to a 6–3 win. The visitors led nearly the entire game, after García hit a two-run home run in the first inning. Nationals starter Foster Griffin cruised on June 10, enjoying plenty of run support as Nationals batters scored ten times in the game. Staked to a 9–1 lead entering the eighth inning, the Nationals bullpen caved in, as relievers Paxton Schultz, Orlando Ribalta, Gus Varland, and Mitchell Parker combined to give up ten runs—five of them in the ninth inning, including rookie first baseman Bryce Eldridge's walkoff grand slam, before Varland or Parker could retire a batter. Rookie Nationals manager Blake Butera described the game as "one of the worst losses I've been a part of" but said he urged his players to move past it and focus on the upcoming homestand. (Note: The June 10 loss to San Francisco was the first game in franchise history that the Nationals (or Montreal Expos) had lost after holding an eight-run lead in the eighth inning or later. (See Zuckerman, Mark, "An unfathomable loss, a new challenge", Nats Journal, June 10, 2026.))

==== 6th homestand: Seattle and Kansas City ====
After a day off, the Nationals came out flat on June 12 as they opened a three-game interleague series at Nationals Park versus the Seattle Mariners. Taking the mound after a rain-delayed start to the game, Littell pitched his worst game in more than a month and took the 10–2 loss. Seattle starter Brad Miller effectively stymied Washington's hitters, scattering two runs—solo homers by outfielders James Wood and Dylan Crews—across eight innings. Pitching in long relief for the Nationals, Cornelio covered 4 1/3 innings, his longest major league outing to date, and was optioned after giving up three earned runs. The Nationals rebounded to win the next two games and take the series. Starting the June 13 game, Cavalli cruised through his first four innings after being spotted a three-run lead before running out of steam in the fifth inning, allowing the Mariners to tie the game on an RBI single by Mitch Garver and a two-run homer by rookie shortstop Colt Emerson. García answered for the Nationals in the bottom of the fifth with a two-run homer, giving Cavalli the win and pinning the loss on his opposite number, Luis Castillo. The Nationals tacked on three more runs against the Seattle bullpen to win 8–3. Tied 1–1 after the Mariners struck first on an error by center fielder Jacob Young and the Nationals designated hitter Wood answered back with his 20th home run of the season in the first inning, the rubber game on June 14 turned into a rout in the fifth inning, as the Nationals batted around and scored five more runs—all charged to Emerson Hancock, who could not get an out in the inning. Pitching behind opener PJ Poulin, who was recalled the previous day to replace Cornelio, Mikolas delivered seven scoreless innings for the Nationals and earned the 10–1 win.

The Nationals extended their winning streak June 15 (Note: With the June 15 win, they improved to 38–35, placing them three games above .500 for the first time since their last winning season in 2019. (See Zuckerman, Mark, "Another small, but significant, step in the right direction", Nats Journal, June 15, 2026.)) as they took the first game of a three-game series hosting the Kansas City Royals. Washington won the game 7–3, rallying after Kansas City briefly took the lead in the fifth inning against the reliever Lord. After García singled in a pair of runs off starter Mitch Spence to put the home team back on top in the bottom of the inning, Crews lined a two-on, two-out home run off Royals reliever Mason Black just inside the left field foul pole, giving them some cushion. The Nationals extended their winning streak to four games June 16. They were led by second baseman Nasim Nuñez, who tripled twice, walked twice, and stole a base, and third baseman Curtis Mead, who hit a two-out, three-run homer in the seventh inning, in the win. Griffin pitched effectively, giving up one run in six innings of work, but the Royals rallied to tie the game against relievers Orlando Ribalta and Richard Lovelady in the seventh before Mead's homer to center put the home team ahead for good. The Royals salvaged the series finale June 17, homering four times off an ineffective Littell to saddle Washington's starter with the loss.

==== 7th roadtrip: Tampa Bay ====
The Tampa Bay Rays hosted the Nationals at the recently rehabilitated Tropicana Field for three games. Scheduled to start the series opener for the Nationals on June 19, Cade Cavalli was scratched shortly before gametime with symptoms of food poisoning. Pitching a day earlier than expected as the bulk reliever behind opener PJ Poulin, Mikolas gave up five runs—three of them on a homer that benefited from Tropicana Field's unique dimensions, a 334 foot (102 m) low line drive by Rays first baseman Jonathan Aranda off the left field foul pole (Note: Aranda's home run would have been a home run in just two other major league parks—Pittsburgh's PNC Park and New York's Yankee Stadium—according to Statcast. (See Berry, Adam, "Aranda's 3-run dinger off foul pole gets Rays back to home cooking", MLB.com, June 19, 2026.))—in six innings to take the loss. Cavalli returned to the mound for the June 20 game, although the right-hander wasn't sharp, managing just 2 2/3 innings before being relieved. Mitchell Parker and Brad Lord combined to cover 5 1/3 scoreless innings and hand off a two-run lead to closer Clayton Beeter, who allowed a run but collected the save. Center fielder Jacob Young made a leaping catch in the eighth inning but slammed into the outfield wall, crumpling to the ground and ultimately exiting the game. The Nationals led for much of the rubber game June 21, but despite shortstop CJ Abrams homering for a third consecutive game, the offense struggled to score consistently against Rays starter Nick Martinez and the Tampa Bay bullpen, while the Rays rallied against relievers Gus Varland and Orlando Ribalta after Nationals starter Andrew Alvarez exited the game. Rays center fielder Jonny DeLuca hit a long two-run homer off Ribalta in the seventh inning to put the home team on top for good, dealing the Nationals their first road series loss since their last trip to Florida more than a month prior.

==== 7th homestand: Philadelphia ====
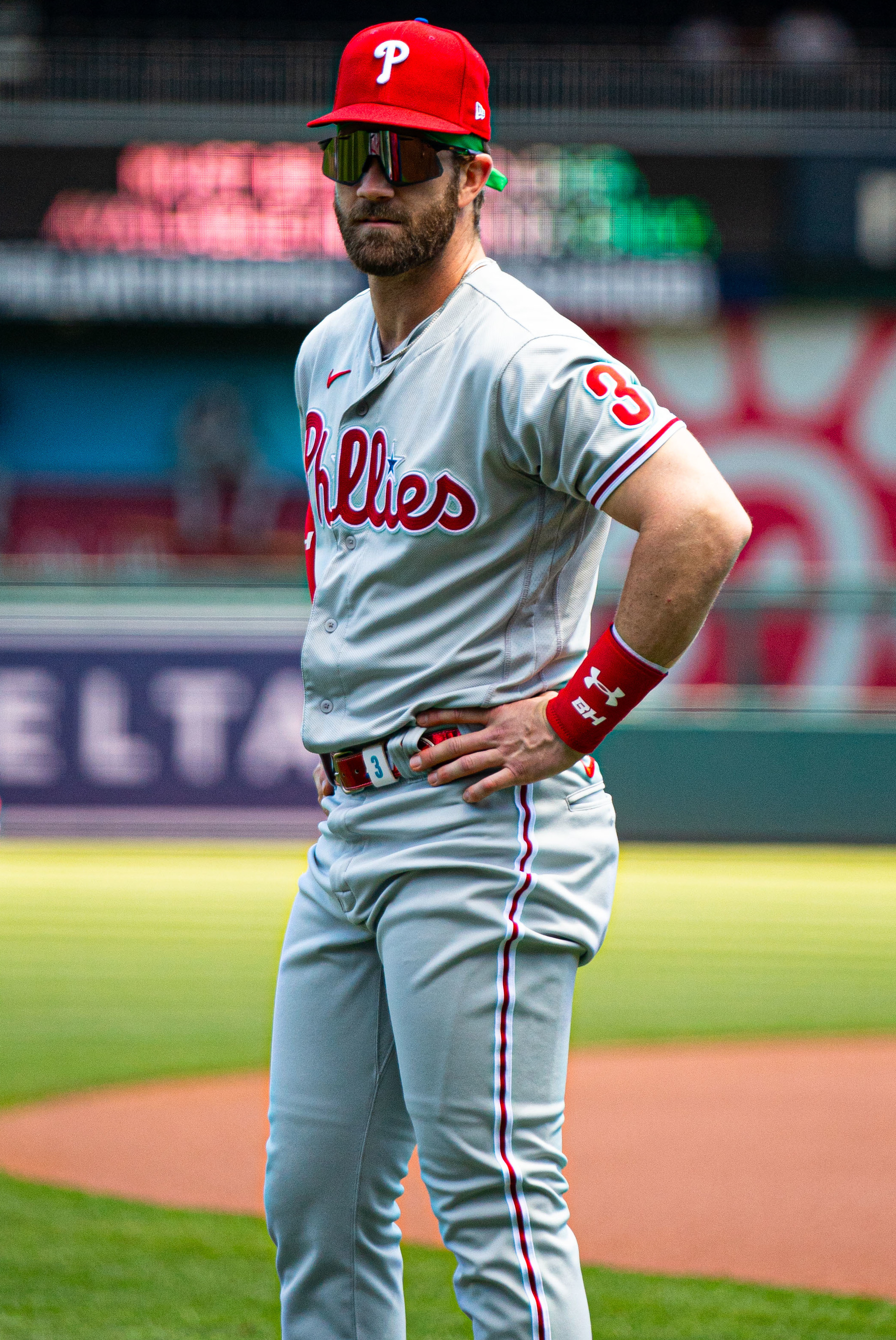
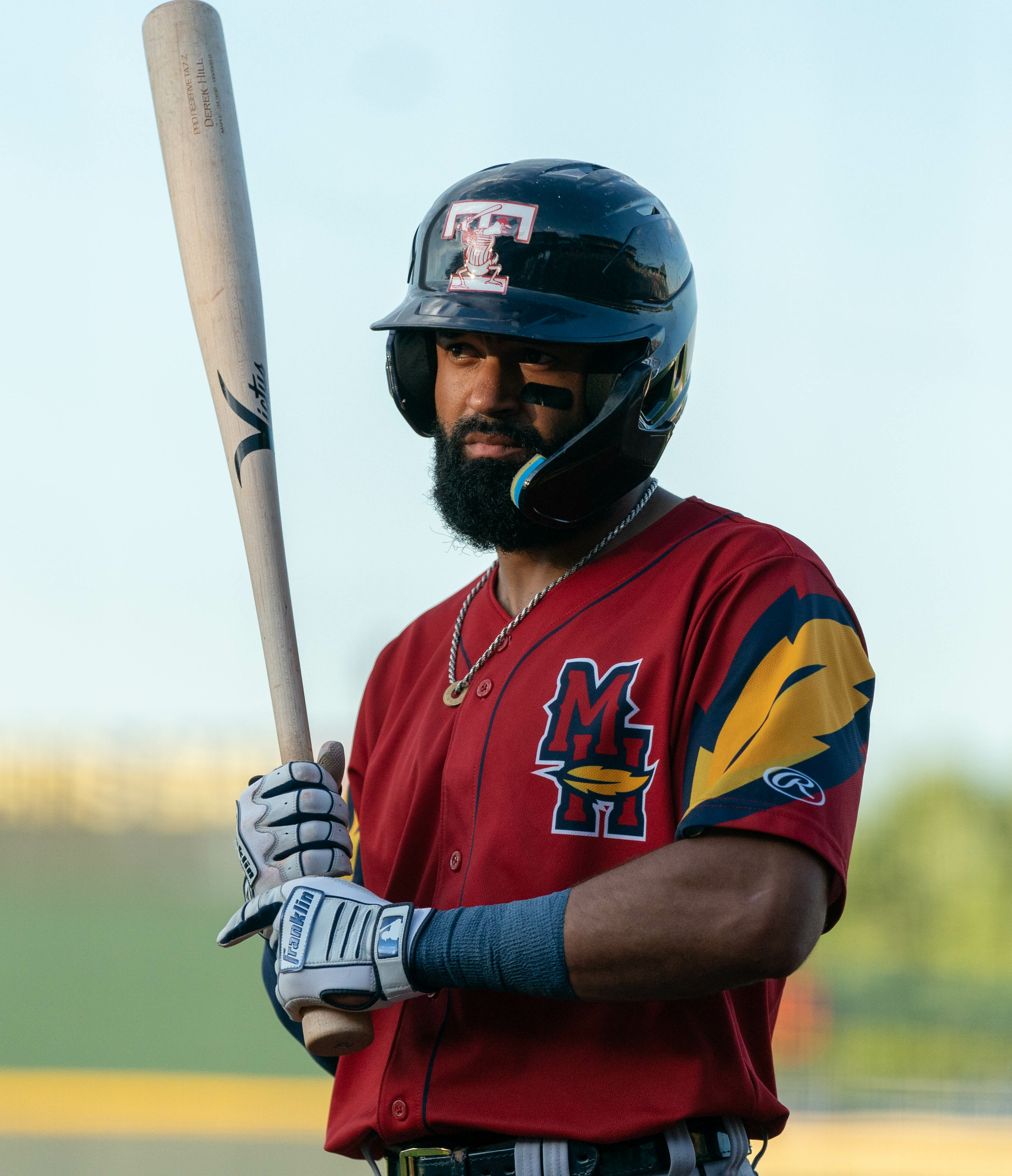
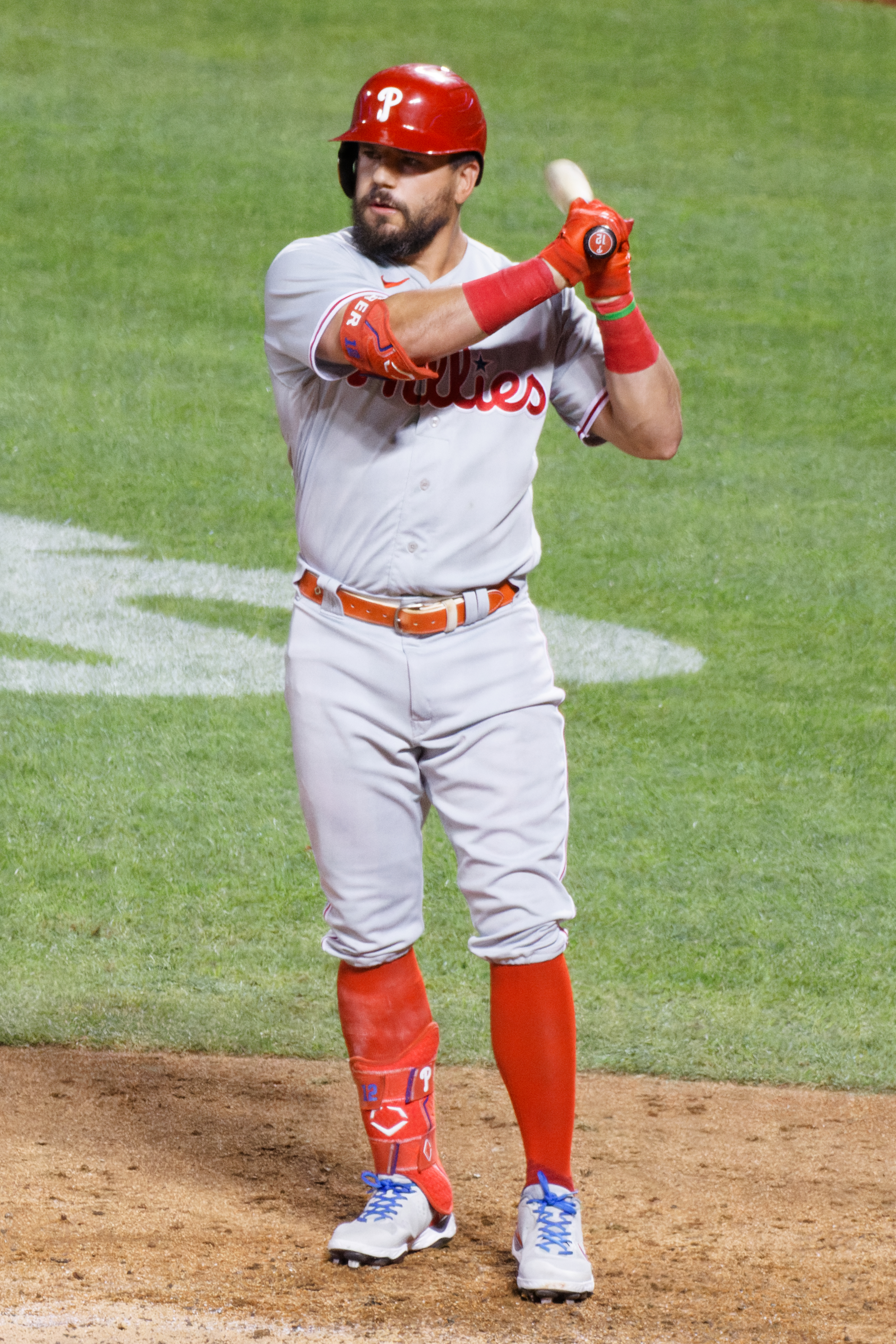
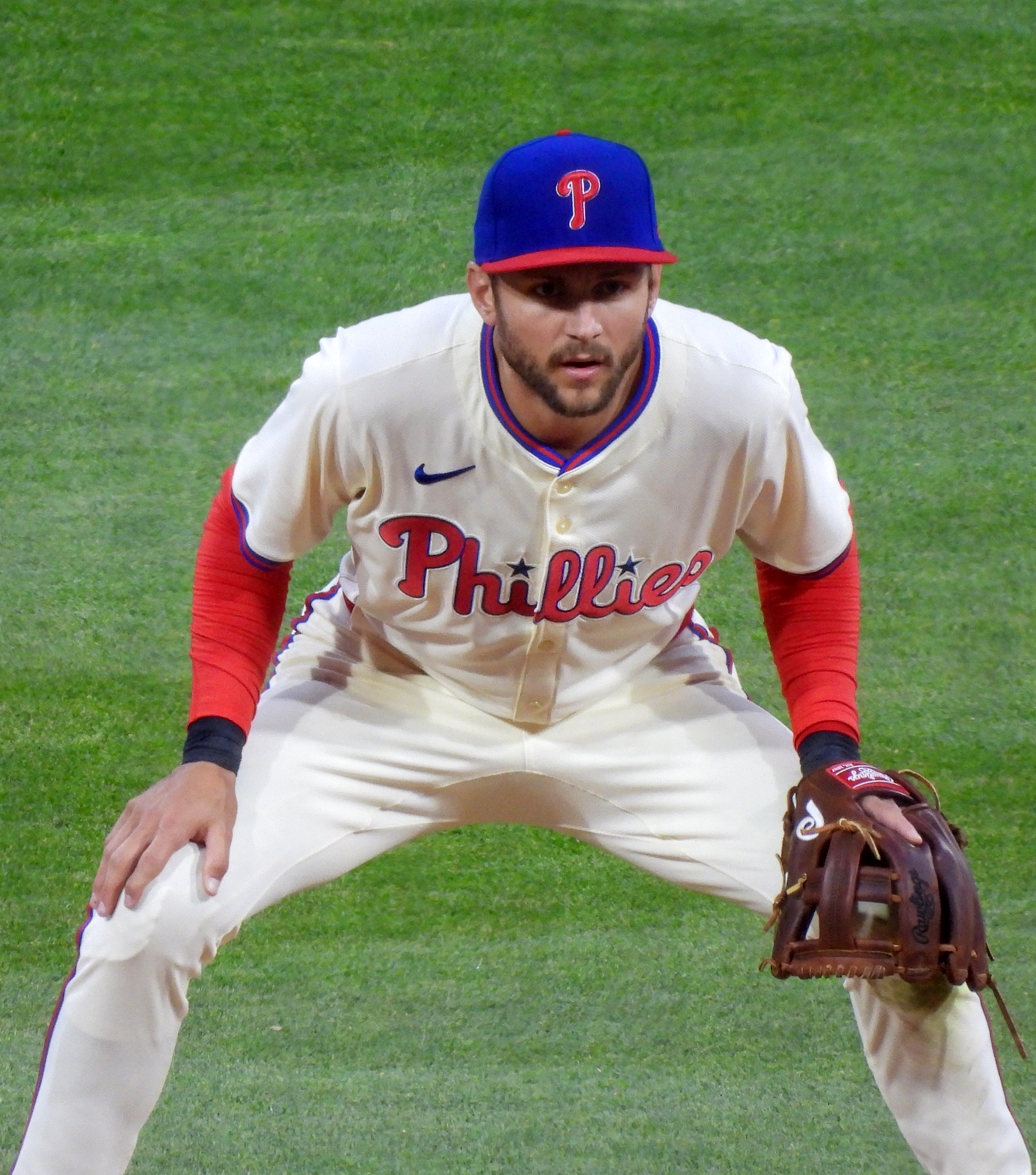
Former Nationals Bryce Harper, Derek Hill, Kyle Schwarber, and Trea Turner played key roles in three straight losses by Washington's beleaguered bullpen as they hosted the Philadelphia Phillies.

A four-game homestand versus the division-rival Philadelphia Phillies turned into one of the most difficult series of the year for the Nationals. Foster Griffin led his team to a 4–1 win in the June 22 series opener, becoming the first National of the season to pitch into the eighth inning of a start while allowing just one run and striking out nine. First baseman Luis García Jr. and third baseman Curtis Mead supplied the offense with home runs. However, the next three games of the series all followed a similar pattern: Washington jumped out to an early lead, only for the bullpen to collapse and the Phillies to take over in the ninth inning. On June 23, the Phillies roared back from a five-run deficit and took the lead with two outs in the eighth inning, on a bases-clearing double by catcher J. T. Realmuto that popped out of the diving right fielder James Wood's glove. The Nationals quickly answered with a three-run homer to dead center by second baseman Jorbit Vivas in the bottom of the inning, and the normally reliable Brad Lord came on and struck out the first two batters in the ninth before giving up a soft single to Philadelphia shortstop Trea Turner. Right fielder Brandon Marsh, who had accounted for the Phillies' single run against Griffin the day before, then homered off the facing of the right field deck to tie the game. The next eight Phillies hitters all reached base safely against Lord—who allowed the Phillies to take the lead on a three-run homer by second baseman Bryson Stott—and reliever Paxton Schultz. García homered for a third straight game in the bottom of the ninth, giving the game its final score of 14–9. The Nationals optioned Schultz after the game, calling up recently acquired left-hander Carson Palmquist for a spot start in front of veteran Miles Mikolas on June 24. Palmquist pitched three scoreless innings before giving up a run in the fourth inning, with Mikolas allowing two more runs in the inning before settling in. Pinch-hitting in the sixth inning, Mead hit a go-ahead home run, but the Nationals bullpen was again unable to hold the lead in the ninth. After Orlando Ribalta issued a two-out walk to designated hitter Kyle Schwarber, left-hander Richard Lovelady entered and got ahead of pinch-hitter Derek Hill before surrendering a two-run homer (Note: With their June 24 comeback win, the Phillies became the first team in the modern era to win back-to-back games after being down to their final strike in the ninth inning. (See Teape, Kenneth, "Phillies Make MLB History in Comeback Wins Against Nationals", Sports Illustrated, June 25, 2026.)) for the blown save and loss. Palmquist was optioned after the game so the Nationals could activate right-hander Justin Lawrence, claimed off waivers that morning from the Minnesota Twins. Despite a quality start from Cade Cavalli and five runs scored off Phillies ace Cristopher Sánchez—including via Mead's third homer of the series—on June 25, as they tried to salvage a series split, the Nationals once again fell apart in the late innings. Philadelphia came back from three runs down in the seventh to tie the game against an ineffectual Mitchell Parker and Clayton Beeter, who combined to walk four in the inning. The Phillies bullpen then kept the Nationals from taking the lead before Philadelphia first baseman Bryce Harper homered off Gus Varland to put his team on top (Note: The go-ahead home runs in back-to-back-to-back games by Bryson Stott, Derek Hill, and Bryce Harper made the Phillies the first team in MLB history to take the lead on homers in the ninth inning of three consecutive games. (See Zuckerman, Mark, "One last insult to wrap up a miserable series", Nats Journal, June 25, 2026.)) for good in the ninth. With the series loss, the Nationals fell back to .500 for the first time in three weeks.

==== 8th roadtrip (part 1): Baltimore and Boston ====
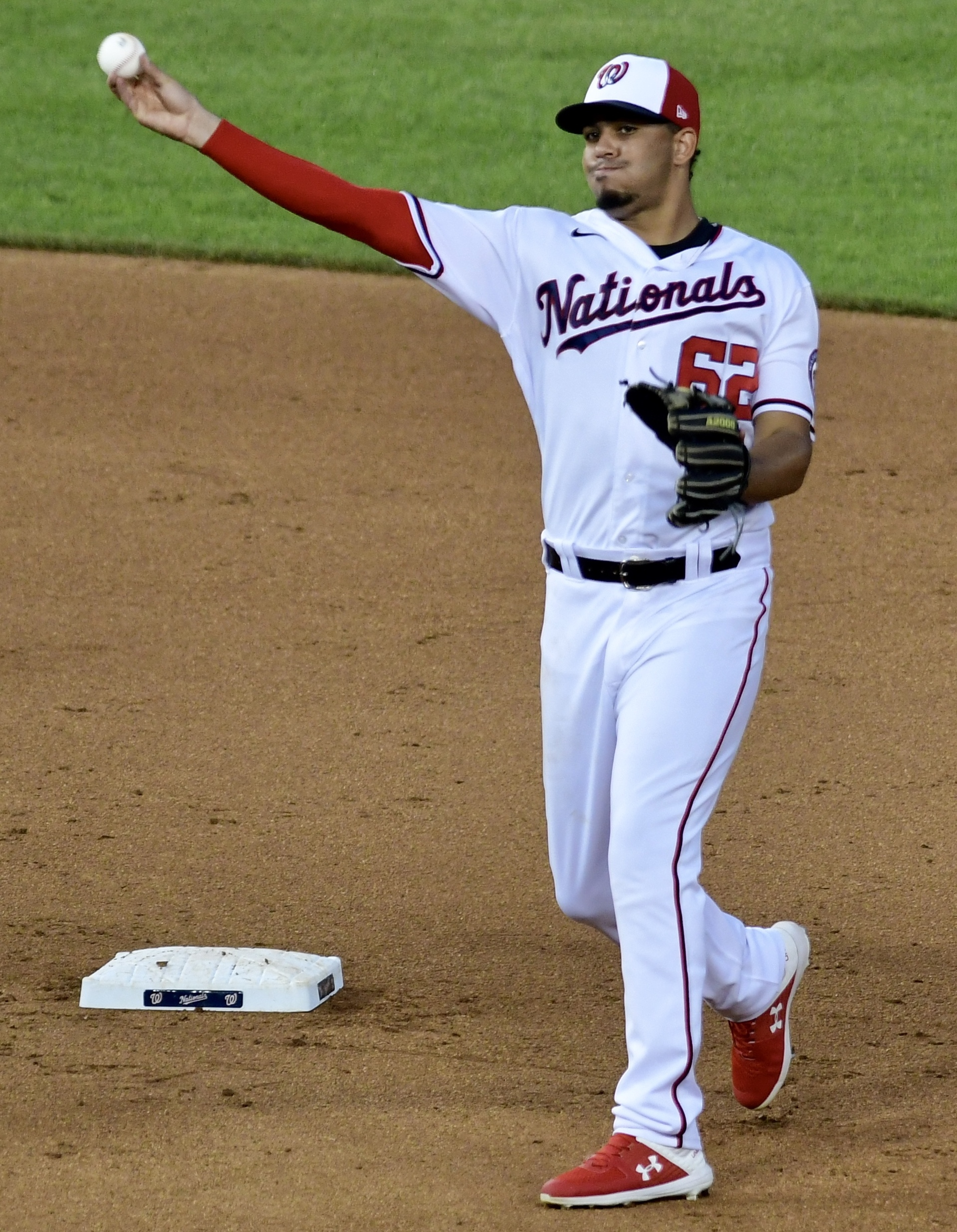
Luis García Jr. was named National League Player of the Week for the first time on June 29.

Heading out on the road, the Nationals extended their losing streak to four games as they dropped the series opener at Oriole Park at Camden Yards against their interleague rivals, the Baltimore Orioles. Washington's offense came out flat, managing just one run against Orioles starter Trevor Rogers before the Baltimore bullpen shut them down the rest of the way. Andrew Alvarez took the loss, giving up two runs in 4 1/3 innings. The Nationals' dip back below .500 was short-lived, as they picked up the next two victories in Baltimore to capture the series and reclaim a winning record. On June 27, Foster Griffin struck out nine over seven innings and exited with a lead, thanks to a two-run homer in the fifth inning by first baseman Luis García Jr., only for relievers PJ Poulin and Orlando Ribalta to give it up in the eighth. With the game tied 3–3 after nine innings, left fielder Daylen Lile struck quickly in the top of the tenth, singling home the automatic runner. Newly acquired right-hander Justin Lawrence locked down the save in the bottom of the tenth in his first appearance since joining the Nationals. (Note: Lawrence became the first Nationals pitcher since Sean Doolittle in July 2017 to record a save in his first appearance with the team. (See Mears, Stephen "This time a blown save didn’t turn into a loss", Nats.Talk, June 28, 2026.)) In the June 28 rubber game, starter Zack Littell bounced back from giving up a two-run homer to Orioles designated hitter Pete Alonso in the first inning, going five innings and not allowing another run. García once again supplied much of the Nationals' offense, hitting a two-run double off Baltimore starter Kyle Bradish to level the score in the third inning before adding two home runs off the Orioles bullpen. Left-hander Mitchell Parker gave up another two-run homer in relief before exiting with an elbow injury later diagnosed as a torn ulnar collateral ligament. Poulin pitched two scoreless innings for the save. García was subsequently named National League Player of the Week for the first time in his career.

The Nationals split their first two games of the season at Fenway Park. They dropped their first game versus the Boston Red Sox on June 29 as veteran Miles Mikolas gave up six runs in seven innings. Red Sox first baseman Willson Contreras was ejected in the first game of the series after tapping his helmet repeatedly, as though signaling for an Automated Ball-Strike System (ABS) challenge, and then again in the second game June 30. In that second game, after striking him out, Nationals starting pitcher Cade Cavalli taunted Contreras—who cut him off and brushed against him while running back to the dugout earlier in the game—by shouting, "Sit down, boy!" The benches emptied after Contreras, who later said he had not heard Cavalli clearly, approached the mound rather than returning to his dugout. Contreras lunged toward Cavalli during the fracas and threw his batting helmet, striking Nationals first baseman Andrés Chaparro. Contreras, Red Sox utility player Nate Eaton, and the Nationals' Mikolas were all ejected for fighting, as was Red Sox interim manager Chad Tracy for arguing the disciplinary decisions. Cavalli, who struck out a career-high 13 batters in seven innings while allowing just one unearned run to earn the win, later said he regretted his choice of words, had not been aware of nor intended any racial connotations, and would not use the phrase again. Major League Baseball suspended Cavalli for seven games and Mikolas for five games, also handing down a seven-game suspension for Contreras and a three-game suspension for Eaton, finding that Cavalli had impermissibly instigated and the other three players had engaged in illegal fighting. All of the involved players appealed their suspensions, delaying them from taking effect; Cavalli's suspension was reduced on appeal to five games, starting July 6.

The Nationals recorded a 13–14 record of wins and losses in June, finishing the month with a 44–43 record, fourth in the National League East Division.

=== July ===
==== 8th roundtrip (part 2): Boston ====
The Nationals finished out their series at Fenway Park by winning the rubber game July 1 in commanding fashion. First baseman Andrés Chaparro and second baseman Nasim Nuñez each homered for the first time of the season, as Washington defeated the Boston Red Sox 10–2.

After the game, the Nationals and Baltimore Orioles announced the first-ever trade between the two teams, after they resolved a long-running dispute over media rights prior to the season. Washington received right-handed reliever Kyle Nicolas, whom the Orioles had recently claimed off waivers from the Cincinnati Reds, in exchange for infield prospect Randal Díaz. Nicolas was immediately optioned to the Class-AAA Rochester Red Wings after the transaction.

==== 8th homestand: Pittsburgh, Houston, and New York ====
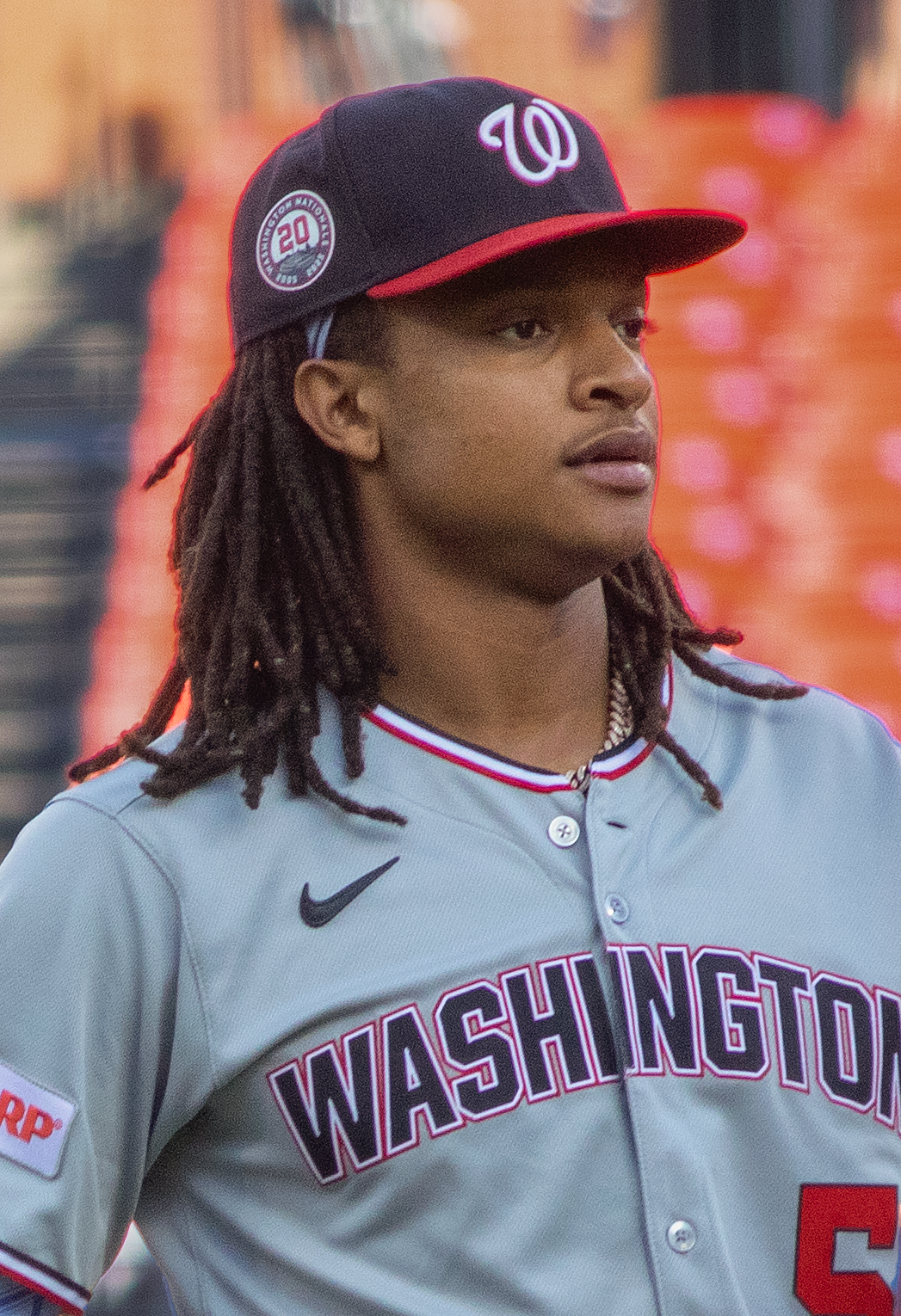
CJ Abrams won the fan voting to be named as the National League's starting shortstop in the All-Star Game.

The Nationals split the first two games of their next series, hosting the Pittsburgh Pirates at Nationals Park. They romped 9–5 in the July 3 series opener behind two-homer days from first baseman Luis García Jr. and left fielder Daylen Lile. Opener Carson Palmquist gave up four early runs to take the loss July 4. Right fielder James Wood homered to the third deck on Pirates starter Braxton Ashcraft's first pitch before the Nationals were shut out the rest of the way. The Pirates took a back-and-forth series opener July 5. Pittsburgh's offense quickly got to starter Cade Cavalli, pitching while his suspension from the previous series remained under appeal. Cavalli was not efficient and labored in the 92 °F (33 °C) heat, giving up four runs and exhibiting a drop in his velocity that he later attributed to lightheadedness and fatigue. The Nationals rallied after Cavalli made his third-inning exit, tying the game at 4–4 before the visitors blew it open late against struggling reliever Brad Lord.

Major League Baseball announced All-Star Game selections on July 4, including CJ Abrams as the National League's starting shortstop, as the top overall vote-getter at the position, and Wood as a reserve outfielder. Starting pitcher Foster Griffin was named to the All-Star pitching staff as an injury replacement.

Meanwhile, the Nationals continued to make over their struggling relief corps. The team acquired lefty Tom Cosgrove in a minor trade with the Houston Astros on July 3. Righty Zak Kent was optioned after giving up four runs in relief in the series opener versus Pittsburgh. Previously optioned reliever Andre Granillo was designated for assignment days after giving up six runs in a relief appearance for Class-AAA Rochester. Washington claimed lefty Matt Krook off the waiver wire and selected righty Eddy Yean from Rochester before the Pirates series finale, also designating former top prospect outfielder Robert Hassell III for assignment to clear roster space. Yean made his major league debut with two scoreless innings of relief July 5 before being optioned back to Rochester.

The nine-game homestand continued with a three-game interleague series versus the Astros, with the Nationals winning two of three. The home team roared back from an early five-run deficit on July 6, leveling the game on a three-run Abrams homer before taking the lead on a home run by third baseman Curtis Mead. After second baseman Nasim Nuñez legged out an infield hit in the bottom of the sixth inning, Wood hit a two-out, 446 foot (136 m) grand slam to straightaway center field, giving the Nationals 12 runs in the game. They needed every one of them, hanging on despite an eighth-inning meltdown by reliever Cole Henry—recalled for the day from Rochester—to win, 12–11. Veteran Miles Mikolas, pitching while his suspension from the Red Sox brawl remained under appeal, earned the win despite giving up seven runs in six innings pitched. (Note: Mikolas became the first Nationals pitcher in team history to earn a win while giving up more than six earned runs. (See Wakai, Brad, "Nationals Offense Helps Miles Mikolas Make Franchise History in Latest Start", Sports Illustrated, July 7, 2026.)) The Astros struck back July 7, scoring five runs off Nationals starter Andrew Alvarez over a career-high 5 2/3 innings of work. Alvarez struggled uncharacteristically with command, walking five and hitting a batter. Krook, activated ahead of the game in place of Henry, also displayed wobbly command in his team debut, with rookie Riley Cornelio coming in to finish the seventh before allowing a solo home run to Astros second baseman Jose Altuve in the eighth. The Nationals rallied in the ninth, bringing the game within winning distance with a home run by designated hitter José Tena off Alimber Santa before loading the bases. Veteran closer Josh Hader struck out pinch-hitter Dylan Crews, representing the potential winning run for the Nationals, on a high fastball to earn the save. The Nationals routed the Astros, 8–2, in the series finale, with García and Abrams each hitting their 20th home run of the season and Griffin pitching seven innings of one-run ball for the win.

Washington's bullpen churn continued, as the team placed Lord on the 15-day injured list with tightness in his side and selected Cosgrove's contract from Rochester ahead of their series opener with the New York Yankees on July 10. The Nationals transferred injured right-hander Jake Irvin to the 60-day injured list as a corresponding move. Cosgrove contributed scoreless appearances out of the bullpen in the first two games of the series. Even so, the Yankees feasted on Nationals relief pitching throughout this series, coming back late and pinning a loss on Krook in the ninth inning July 10; again on erstwhile closer Clayton Beeter—traded by the Yankees to Washington a year earlier—in the eighth inning July 11; and finally on the swingman Alvarez—pitching out of the bullpen behind Cavalli, with Cavalli's return from suspension—in the eighth inning June 12. Krook was designated for assignment before the series finale, with the Nationals recalling first baseman Abimelec Ortiz from Rochester for the day, as Mikolas began serving his suspension the same day. Wood hit a leadoff home run for the second straight game (Note: With his first-inning homer July 12, his tenth of the season, Wood passed the previous Montreal–Washington franchise record of nine leadoff home runs in a season, which was jointly held by Brad Wilkerson for the 2004 Expos and by Alfonso Soriano for the 2006 Nationals. (See DiPietro, Lou, "James Wood hits 10th leadoff homer of 2026, setting new Nats single-season record", The Team 980, July 12, 2026.)) and Ortiz doubled in his major league debut on July 12, but the Yankees won the game, 5–3, to complete the sweep. Wood and Yankees first baseman Ben Rice, who homered in the series opener and hit a go-ahead triple off Alvarez in the finale, were named National League and American League Players of the Week, respectively. Losing all three games to the Yankees left the Nationals one game below .500 entering the All-Star break.

==== 9th roundtrip: Sacramento and Colorado ====
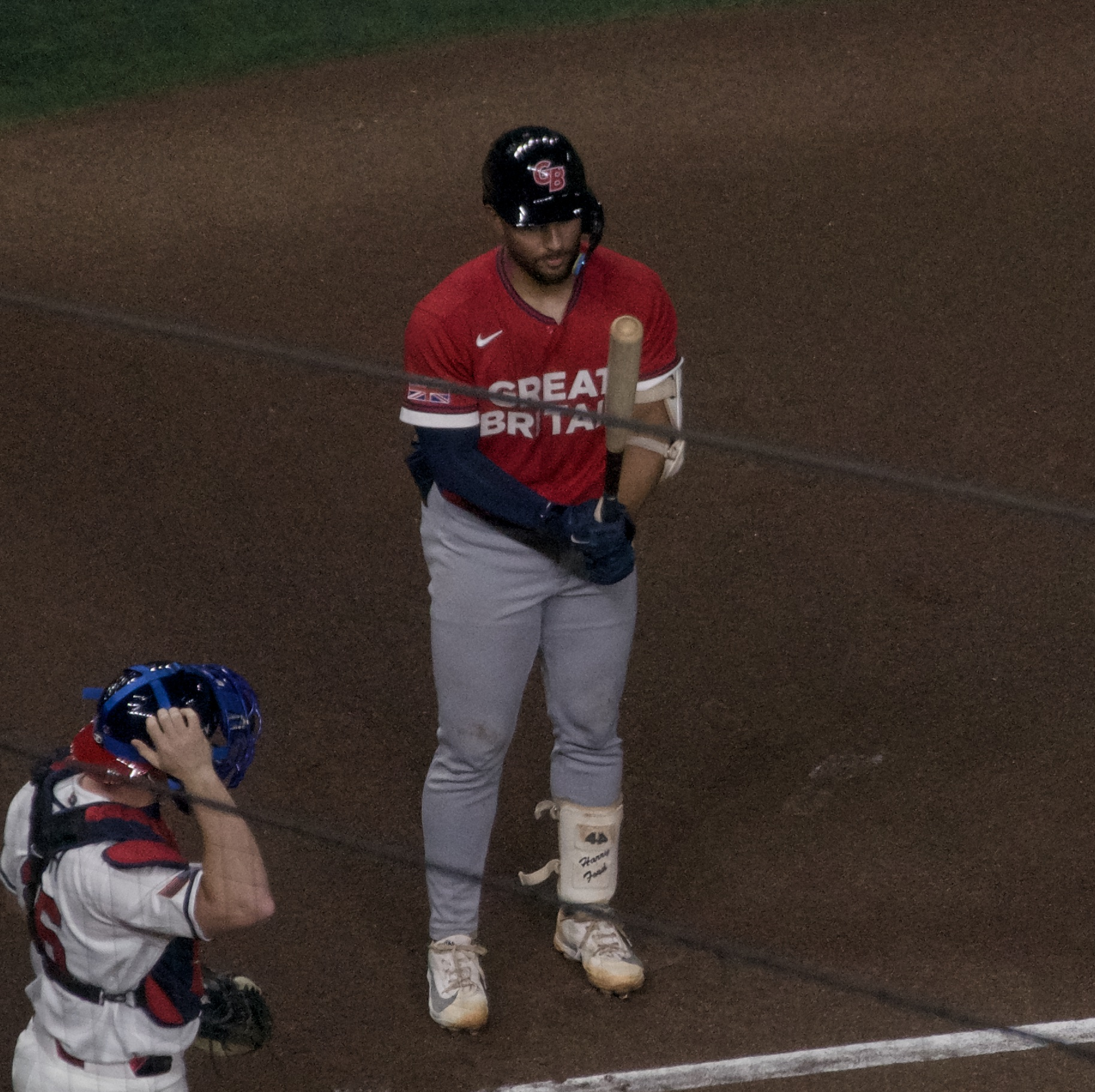
Top catching prospect Harry Ford homered in his Nationals debut July 17.

The Nationals began the official second half of the season with a blowout win over the Athletics at Sutter Health Park on July 17, followed by a blowout loss July 18. In the first game of the three-game set, Washington scored 23 runs (Note: In their July 17 win in West Sacramento, the Nationals scored more runs in a game than they had since July 31, 2018, when they defeated the New York Mets 25–4, and tied a franchise record for the second-most runs scored in a game. (See "Andrés Chaparro racks up 8 RBIs as Nationals hand A's their 10th straight loss with 23-4 rout", CBS News, July 17, 2026.)) as first baseman Andrés Chaparro homered twice, including a 467 foot (142 m) blast to left field; (Note: Chaparro's first home run of the July 17 game was the longest by a National since the 2018 season. (See "Chaparro's 467-foot blast is the fourth longest home run by a National in the Statcast Era (2015-pres.)", x.com, July 17, 2026.)) catcher Harry Ford, called up that day after Drew Millas landed on the injured list with a fractured finger, hit his first career home run in his Nationals debut; and third baseman Curtis Mead doubled thrice for his first career game with three extra-base hits. The Athletics returned the favor July 18. Shortstop Jacob Wilson homered on the first pitch he saw from Zack Littell, opening a five-run frame for the Nationals starter, as the home team led wire-to-wire. Athletics starter J. T. Ginn carried a no-hit bid into the seventh inning, and the Nationals lost big, 15–1. In between the second and third games of the series, the Nationals re-signed reliever Matt Krook—who was already in the Sacramento area—after releasing him days earlier, simultaneously placing left-hander PJ Poulin on the injured list with a left flexor strain. Washington won the July 19 rubber game behind starter Foster Griffin, who allowed one run over seven innings (Note: With his July 19 outing, Griffin set a new team record of eight consecutive starts allowing one run or fewer to seven, surpassing the previous record of seven jointly held by Stephen Strasburg for the 2013 Nationals and Jordan Zimmermann for the 2012 Nationals, and tying the franchise record set by Pedro Martínez across the 1996 and 1997 Montreal Expos seasons. (See Zuckerman, Mark, "Consistency in production", Nats Journal, July 8, 2026, and "Foster Griffin has made eight consecutive starts without allowing more than one earned run", x.com, July 19, 2026.)) to earn the win. Shortstop CJ Abrams and right fielder Dylan Crews also slugged back-to-back home runs in the fifth inning off Athletics reliever and former Nationals prospect Elvis Alvarado.

Chaparro again led the attack July 20, as the Nationals opened a three-game series at Coors Field against the Colorado Rockies. The Nationals designated hitter pulled a three-run homer in the first inning off Colorado left-hander Kyle Freeland, giving Washington an early lead. The Rockies equalized in the third inning with a bases-clearing double by Willi Castro, but starter Andrew Alvarez and the Nationals bullpen kept them off the scoreboard the rest of the way. Center fielder Jacob Young hit a solo home run to stick Freeland with the loss, while Abrams homered and pinch-hitter Daylen Lile tripled off the Rockies' relief corps to add some insurance. Lefty reliever Tom Cosgrove pitched two innings for his first save of the season, retiring all six batters he faced on just 10 pitches. Before the second game of the series, Washington designated reliever Justin Lawrence for assignment and recalled rookie Eddy Yean to replace him in the bullpen. Nationals pitcher Miles Mikolas was also reinstated from his suspension July 21, taking the ball behind opener Carson Palmquist. Neither were effective, with Palmquist giving up four runs in his second inning of work. The Nationals' offense matched the Rockies blow for blow, with Abrams homering twice and driving in four runs to lead the way, but Colorado catcher Hunter Goodman put the home team ahead for good with a solo home run off Clayton Beeter in the eighth inning. The Rockies won, 8–7. The Nationals won the series July 22, as ace Cade Cavalli led a 8–0 shutout, outdueling rookie Gabriel Hughes. Hughes pitched four scoreless innings before giving up a run on a James Wood sacrifice fly in the fifth, then the Nationals broke it open with six runs in the seventh inning off relievers Jimmy Herget and Zach Agnos.

==== 9th homestand: Arizona and Toronto ====
The team returned to Nationals Park to host the Arizona Diamondbacks and the Toronto Blue Jays for consecutive three-game series. They opened the homestand July 24 with a 3–2 loss. Washington right fielder Dylan Crews leveled the game with a two-run home run after the Diamondbacks scratched across a pair of runs in the second inning against Carson Palmquist and Zack Littell, before Arizona catcher Gabriel Moreno hit a sacrifice fly off Littell in the seventh inning to put the visitors on top for good. The Nationals struck back July 25. While starter Foster Griffin had his worst outing in weeks, he still managed to deliver a quality start, allowing three runs over 6 2/3 innings. The Nationals offense battered rookie starter Mitch Bratt for five runs over five innings, while both teams' bullpens held firm the rest of the way. In a Nationals win on July 26, shortstop CJ Abrams homered twice—setting a new team record for homers by a shortstop in a single season (Note: The previous record of 25 was set by Ian Desmond in the 2012 season. (See "CJ Abrams passes Ian Desmond with solo home run (26)", MLB.com, July 26, 2026.))—as did left fielder James Wood, who hit his 29th and 30th homers of the year. (Note: Wood became the first National with at least 30 home runs in consecutive seasons since Adam Dunn in 2009 and 2010. (See "Back-to-back 30-HR seasons for James Wood", x.com, July 25, 2026.)) After Miles Mikolas labored through four innings, Wood slugged a two-run home run to straightaway center field to tie the game in the bottom of the fifth inning, before Abrams' second home run of the game three batters later gave the Nationals the lead. The Diamondbacks rallied against relievers Matt Krook—who walked three straight batters and was lifted from the game without recording an out—and Clayton Beeter to score twice and bring the go-ahead run to the plate in the ninth inning, but Beeter induced a groundout from rookie first baseman Tyler Locklear to seal the series win. Abrams was named National League Player of the Week after recording hits in all six games he played during the week, including five home runs.

Midway through the series against the Diamondbacks, the Nationals swung a major trade with the Boston Red Sox. Late on July 25, the Nationals traded away infielder Curtis Mead—who had emerged as the team's primary third baseman after being picked up in a minor trade at the start of the season—for 24-year-old starting pitcher Connelly Early, rehabbing a left elbow injury after debuting in the major leagues during the 2025 season and getting off to a strong start in 2026. President of Baseball Operations Paul Toboni, who had been involved with the Red Sox front office in drafting and developing Early, described the trade as "a fit for both teams" that helped to address the Nationals' need for pitching. The Nationals recalled third baseman Brady House from the Class-AAA Rochester Red Wings to replace Mead on the roster before the July 26 rubber game.

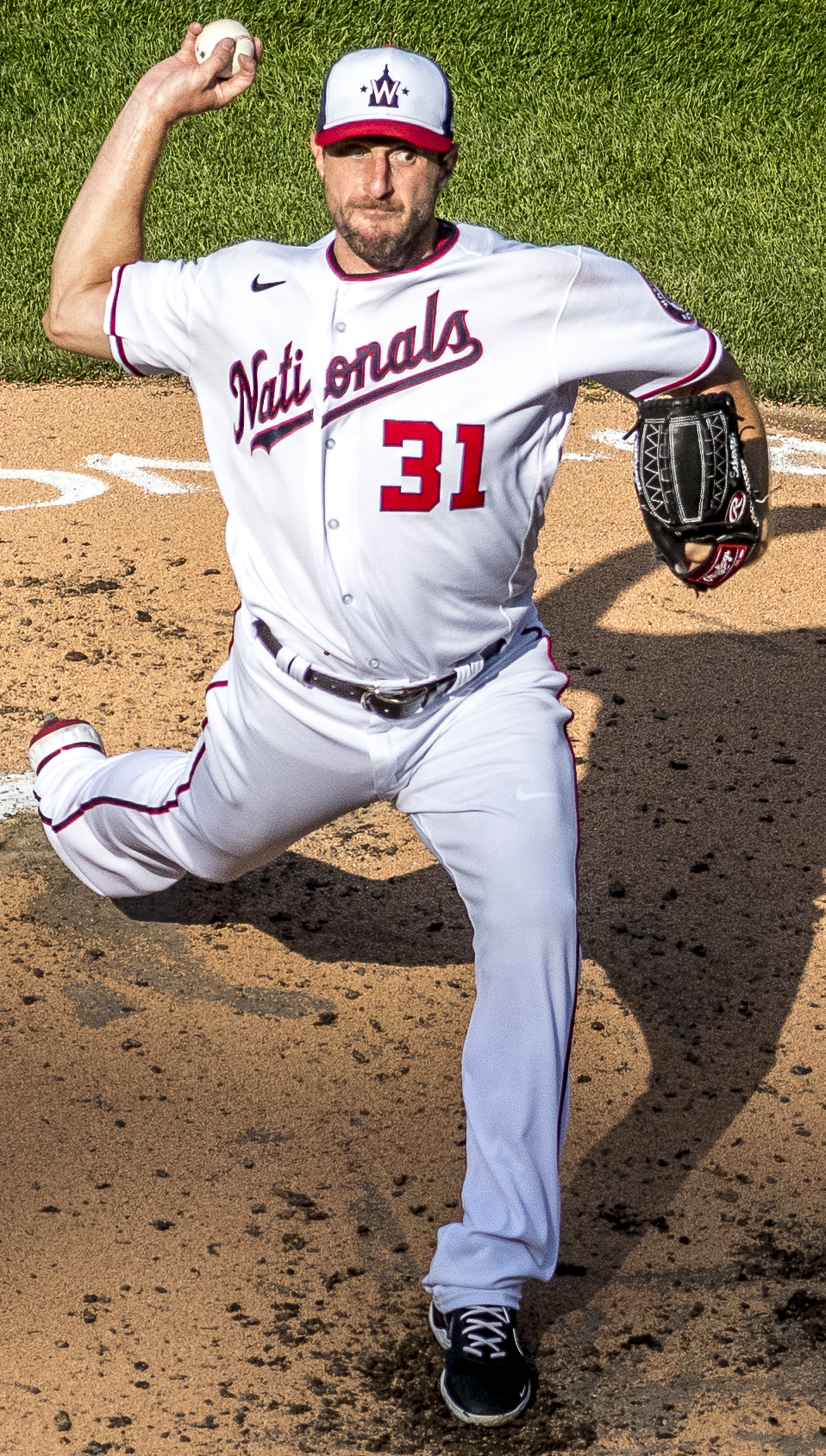
Former Nationals ace Max Scherzer returned to Nationals Park to start for the Toronto Blue Jays on July 27, his 42nd birthday.

Krook was designated for assignment before the start of the Blue Jays series July 27, with Paxton Schultz recalled to replace him in the bullpen. Toronto activated Max Scherzer for the start on his 42nd birthday, and the longtime Nationals ace worked through early jams and long counts to deliver 2 2/3 innings of one-run ball in his return to action at his former home ballpark, receiving a standing ovation from fans as he exited the game. After being unable to break through against the veteran Scherzer, the Nationals only scored one more run the rest of the way, on a pinch-hit home run by Andrés Chaparro, and lost the game, 3–2. The home offense came out of the gates hot in the second game of the series, taking advantage as Toronto starter Shane Bieber struggled to find the strikezone and issued six walks, three of them with the bases loaded, before being taken out of the game in the first inning. (Note: The Nationals set a new team record for walks taken in an inning, after having last walked five times in an inning in April 2019. Meanwhile, Bieber became the first pitcher to walk six batters in the first inning of a major league game since Daniel Cabrera for the 2006 Baltimore Orioles. (See Camerato, Jessica, "Nationals walk their way to a team record, then use power to put away Blue Jays", MLB.com, July 28, 2026, and "Blue Jays' Shane Bieber walks six in two-thirds of an inning", ESPN.com, July 28, 2026.)) Nationals starter Cade Cavalli delivered a quality start of three runs allowed in six innings pitched. While the Blue Jays were able to cut the home team's lead to two when George Springer hit a three-run homer off Gus Varland—recalled for the game after Andrew Alvarez was optioned to Rochester—in the eighth inning, Orlando Ribalta and Beeter retired the next six batters in a row to close out the win. The Nationals optioned Varland after the game to clear a spot for long reliever Trevor Williams, who was activated from the 60-day injured list for his season debut July 29 after rehabbing from internal brace surgery to repair damage to his right ulnar collateral ligament. Littell put up 4 2/3 scoreless innings before giving way to the bullpen. The visitors capitalized after Littell's exit, scoring five runs over the next three innings. The Blue Jays' Trey Yesavage pitched into the seventh inning, allowing one run, and while the Nationals were able to get to Tyler Rogers for one more, Toronto closer Louis Varland slammed the door with a two-inning save. Schultz was optioned back to Rochester after giving up three runs in the eighth inning.

==== 10th roadtrip (part 1): Atlanta ====
The Nationals finished July on a three-game losing streak, as they dropped the first two games of a four-game set with the Atlanta Braves at Truist Park. Despite a two-homer game by left fielder Daylen Lile contributing to an early three-run lead, the Nationals fell 5–4, as they could not muster a single hit with runners in scoring position July 30. Jake Irvin was activated off the 60-day injured list for the start, replacing Paxton Schultz on the active roster. Irvin did not allow a baserunner through three innings, but he then gave up three runs in the fourth and fifth before bequeathing two baserunners to reliever Carson Palmquist in the sixth, both of whom scored. Washington's offensive slump continued July 31, as the team only scored twice to back left-hander Foster Griffin in his final start before the trade deadline. The Nationals again went hitless with runners in scoring position, scratching across only a pair of solo homers by CJ Abrams and Andrés Chaparro, who entered the game as a substitute when Luis García Jr. exited with right knee soreness. Griffin battled through early trouble to reach the sixth inning with just two runs allowed, but he then gave up a three-run homer to Michael Harris II and a single to Mauricio Dubón, who later scored. Veteran Trevor Williams relieved Griffin and finished out the game for the Nationals.

The Nationals finished July with a 55–56 record, fourth in the National League East Division, having gone 11–13 in the month. They set a new franchise record for home runs in a calendar month with 50. Abrams, who hit 10 of those home runs, was awarded as National League Player of the Month.

=== August ===
==== 10th roadtrip (part two): Atlanta and Philadelphia ====
Finishing their four-game series against the Atlanta Braves, the Nationals ran their losing streak to five games as they were swept by the division leaders. Filling in on an emergency basis after scheduled starter Reynaldo López was injured during warmups, veteran Martín Pérez kept the Nationals off-balance for seven innings August 1, giving up just one hit. The Nationals rallied in the eighth inning but came up short in a 8–3 loss for the visiting team. The Nationals again struggled to drive in runs August 2. Starter Cade Cavalli pitched well for Washington but took the loss, after the Braves scored the go-ahead run in the fifth inning on shortstop CJ Abrams' third fielding error of the series.

First baseman Luis García Jr., the Nationals' longest-tenured player, was scratched from the lineup minutes before the August 2 series finale in Atlanta. The Nationals announced after the game that they traded García to the New York Yankees for pitching prospects Jack Cebert, Yovanny Cruz, and Ben Grable plus veteran reliever Jake Bird, Washington's second major move ahead of the trade deadline. The following day, the Nationals made a third major trade, sending starter Foster Griffin to the Cleveland Guardians for reliever Will Dion, pitching prospects Josh Hartle and Kendeglys Virguez, and minor league outfielder Nick Mitchell. The Nationals also swung another minor trade with the Baltimore Orioles, acquiring relief prospect Joe Glassey for outfielder Christian Franklin, who had yet to debut for the Nationals.

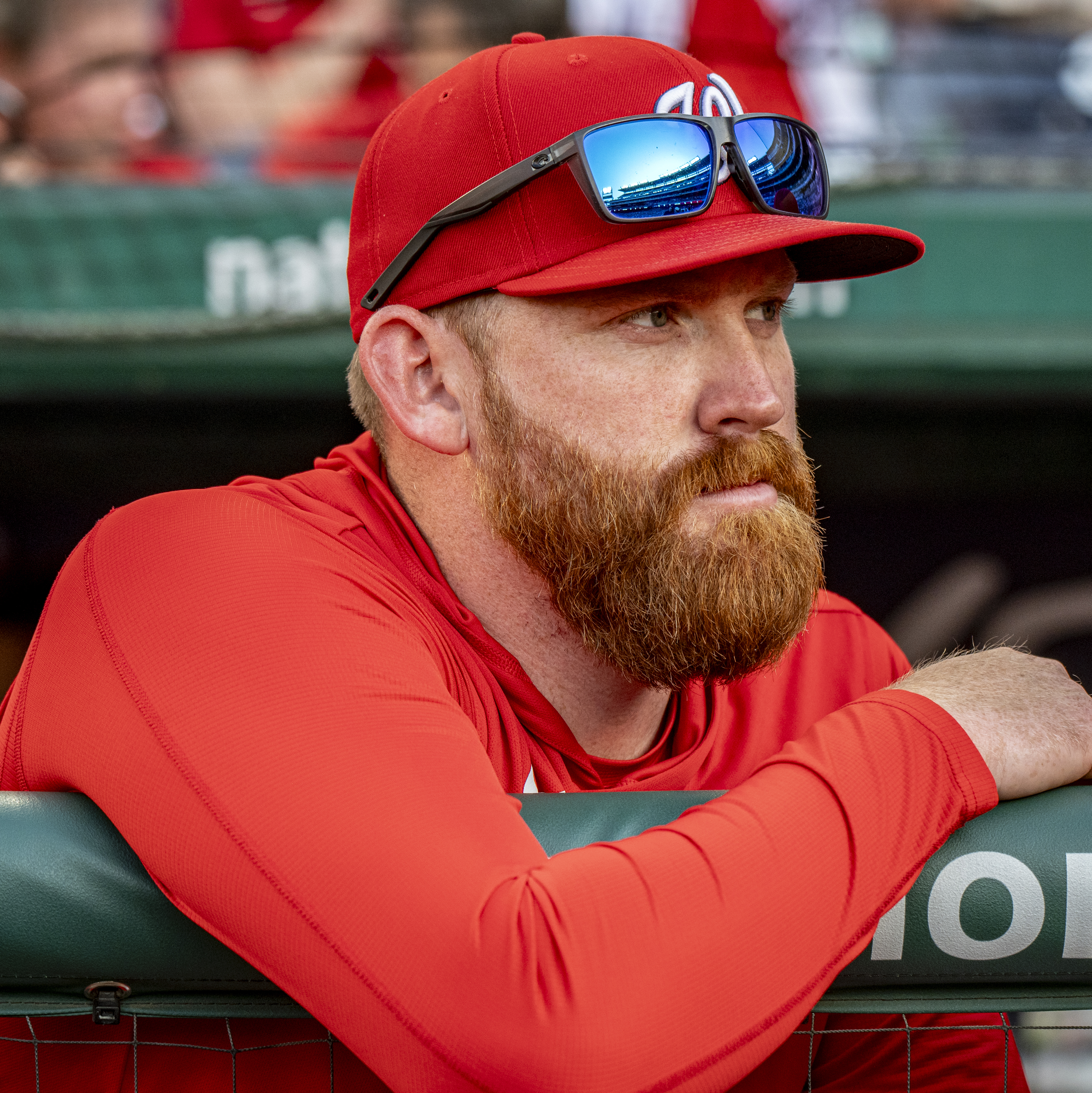
The Nationals released veteran pitcher Zack Littell after a rough outing August 4 against the Philadelphia Phillies.

Bird and rookie Riley Cornelio were optioned to the Class-AAA Rochester Red Wings ahead of the Nationals' four-game series visiting the Philadelphia Phillies, with left-hander PJ Poulin also transferred to the 60-day injured list as he continued to deal with a left flexor strain. The Nationals dropped their first two games in Philadelphia, extending their losing streak to a season-high seven games, as the team's struggles with runners in scoring position deepened. Swingman Andrew Alvarez was recalled to join the rotation August 3, and the newly acquired reliever Cruz was activated. While Alvarez provided six scoreless innings and the Nationals scored thrice early against Phillies starter Aaron Nola, Alvarez hit a batter and walked another in the seventh inning before reliever Tom Cosgrove entered and surrendered a go-ahead grand slam to pinch-hitter Derek Hill. Washington manager Blake Butera was ejected for the first time in his managerial career after the Nationals argued a non-reviewable call that second baseman Nasim Nuñez was out of the basepath, during a sixth-inning rundown between third and home in which Nuñez appeared to trip over Phillies catcher Garrett Stubbs. Star right fielder James Wood exited the game with tightness in his side after a swing and was placed on the injured list with what the Nationals described as a mild oblique strain the next day. The Nationals also optioned rookie reliever Eddy Yean after the August 3 game. Washington selected the contract of outfielder Andrew Pinckney from the Red Wings and activated Dion for the August 4 game, but neither player appeared in the 5–0 shutout. Phillies starter Jesús Luzardo pitched eight scoreless innings as the Nationals repeatedly failed to cash in with runners in scoring position, going 0-for-11. Opener Carson Palmquist, who took the loss, struggled immediately and was replaced after allowing one run and collecting just one out in the first inning, and the Phillies later added four more runs against Zack Littell, who was designated for assignment after the game. The Nationals snapped their skid on August 5, although they needed extra innings to do it. Catcher Keibert Ruiz put Washington on the board early, singling in Abrams in the first inning, against Philadelphia starter Andrew Painter. The Phillies rallied to take the lead against Jake Irvin, the Nationals' starting pitcher, who gave up two runs in 5 1/3 innings before giving way to the bullpen. Both Washington and Philadelphia's new trade acquisitions struggled in relief. Pinch-hitter Brady House homered off Phillies lefty Brooks Raley, recently acquired from the New York Mets, to tie the game, then Abrams singled in center fielder Jacob Young for the lead. The Phillies quickly struck back with a game-tying run off Cruz in his Nationals debut. Both teams traded runs in the 10th inning before the Nationals blew it open in the 11th against new Phillies reliever Caleb Kilian, including a two-run triple by Abrams for the lead, before Abrams scored on a bunt by pinch-hitter Miles Mikolas. (Note: Mikolas became the first Nationals pitcher credited with an RBI since Erick Fedde in August 2021, the last season in which the designated hitter rule was not used in the National League. (See Zuckerman, Mark, "Going the extra Miles to end a losing streak", Nats Journal, August 5, 2026.)) Brad Lord, activated off the injured list to replace Littell on the active roster, pitched a scoreless bottom of the 11th to secure the 10–4 victory. The Phillies captured the finale and a series win August 6, getting to Mikolas—starting the game for the Nationals after pinch-hitting the night before—for six runs and tacking on a seventh against reliever Max Kranick, as Mikolas and Kranick combined to give up 16 runs, including eight doubles, in seven innings. In his second major league at-bat, Pinckney homered off Phillies ace Cristopher Sánchez for his first career hit. (Note: Pinckney was the first National to record a home run for his first MLB hit since Joey Meneses in August 2022. (See Camerato, Jessica, "First MLB hit? How about a 400-foot homer off a Cy Young contender!", MLB.com, August 6, 2026.)) The Nats scored three runs but squandered several more opportunities against Sánchez and the Phillies bullpen.

==== 10th homestand: Cincinnati and Chicago ====
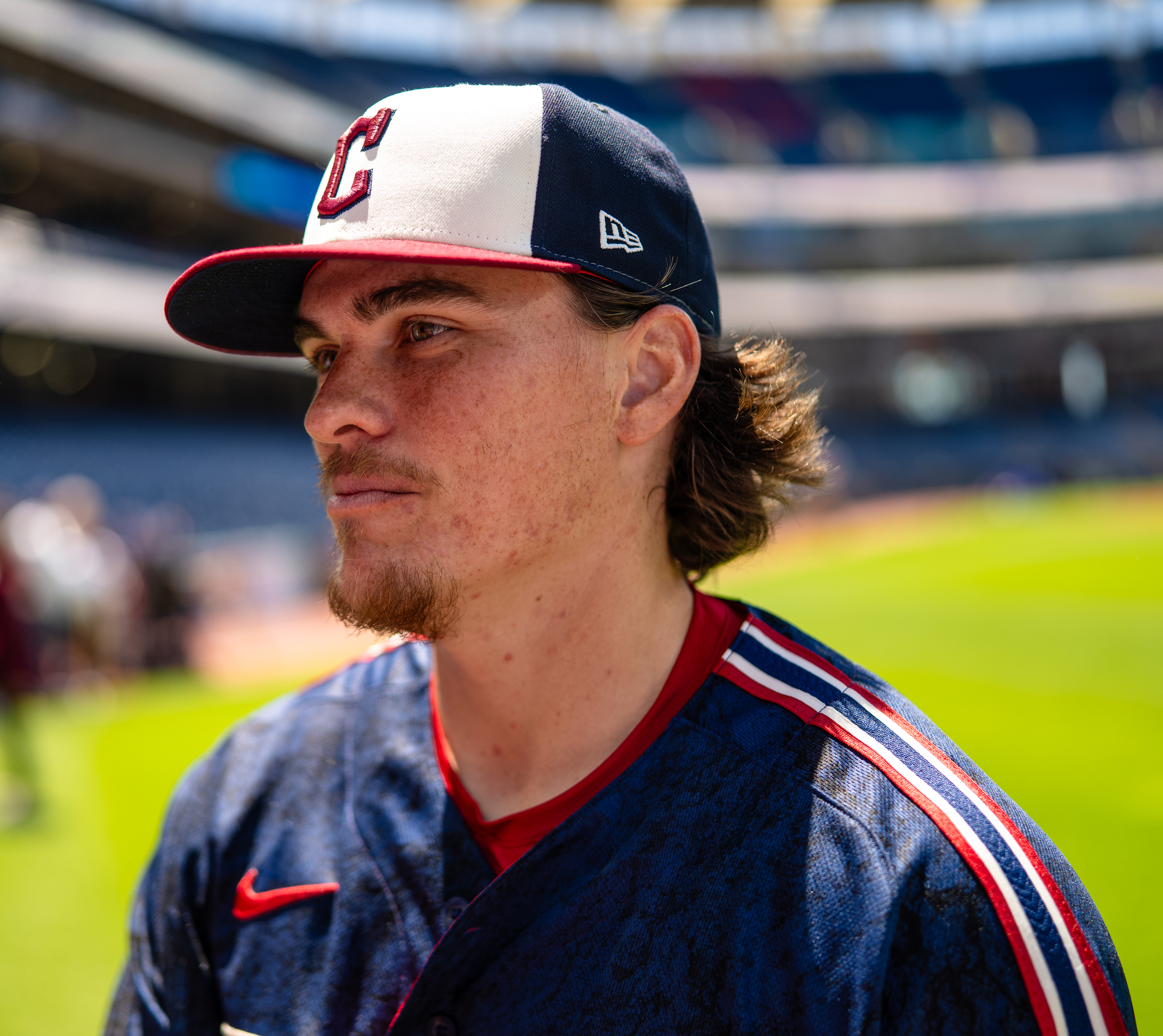
Rookie Will Dion earned his first career win August 9 with three scoreless relief innings, days after the Nationals acquired him from the Cleveland Guardians.

Following a tough 1–7 roadtrip, the Nationals rebounded with a three-game series sweep over the Cincinnati Reds at Nationals Park—their first sweep since April. Ace Cade Cavalli provided the Nationals with a quality start August 7, scattering three solo home runs over six innings. Left fielder Daylen Lile pulled a three-run homer in the first inning to give the Nationals an early lead. After the Reds tied it, catcher Harry Ford hit a two-run homer to left-center in the fifth. Relievers Yovanny Cruz, Orlando Ribalta, and Clayton Beeter held the lead for the Nationals, with Beeter recording the save. Nationals left-hander Andrew Alvarez outdueled Cincinnati's Chase Burns on August 8. The Nationals got to Burns for five runs, snapping a 12-game streak of wins for the Reds ace. Reliever Max Kranick gave up a two-run homer to Reds designated hitter Eugenio Suárez after taking over for Alvarez in the top of the sixth inning, but the Nationals rallied to force Burns out of the game and retake the lead in the home sixth on a pinch-hit double by Andrés Chaparro off Reds reliever Sam Moll. The Nationals kept adding on against the Reds bullpen, while the home relief corps held the lead, and the Nationals won, 8–2. The Nationals threw a bullpen game for the series finale August 9. Newly acquired reliever Jake Bird was recalled from the minor leagues in place of left-hander Carson Palmquist, who was optioned. Brad Lord allowed a run over 2 2/3 innings as the opener before handing it off to lefty Will Dion, who pitched three scoreless frames and earned his first career win. The Nationals pinned a loss on Reds starter Brady Singer, who gave up three runs in six innings, and added on against the bullpen for a 7–1 final, with Bird closing it out in his team debut.

The Nationals dropped their first two games of three hosting the Chicago Cubs. Right-hander Jake Irvin struggled to find the strikezone, allowing five runs in a short start of 3 1/3 innings and leaving the home team in an early hole August 11. The offense rallied but the comeback came up short in an 8–6 loss, as the Cubs tacked on runs against Kranick, Ribalta, and Miles Mikolas, who pitched three innings in long relief. The Nationals designated Mikolas for assignment before the August 12 game to clear a roster spot for rookie Jackson Kent, who was selected from Class-AAA Rochester to join the rotation. Facing his childhood favorite team, Kent allowed just one hit over his first four innings while striking out five, but left in to start the fifth inning, he gave up a single, a walk, and a double and was relieved without recording an out. Bird, who took over on the mound, then gave up a three-run homer to Cubs designated hitter Alex Bregman, the first of three home runs Bregman hit in consecutive plate appearances August 12. The Nationals battled back to tie the game before the Cubs blew it open against a procession of relievers led by left-hander Tom Cosgrove, who took the loss. Abimelec Ortiz smashed a pinch-hit home run 407 feet (124 m) into the third deck in right field off Cubs reliever Javier Assad in the sixth inning, but the Cubs scored three more runs off long reliever Trevor Williams for a 12–6 final score. The Nationals salvaged a win in the series August 13 as Cavalli authored the best start of his career to that point, striking out ten and holding the Cubs to just one hit over eight innings. Cavalli took his bid for a no-hitter into the seventh inning before Cubs first baseman Michael Busch dunked a flyball into shallow left field for a two-out single, Chicago's only hit of the ballgame. Ortiz homered for the second time in as many games, driving in three runs to lead the Nationals offense in the 7–0 shutout.

==== 11th roadtrip: New York, Texas, and Miami ====
To begin a long roadtrip, the Nationals were swept over three games at the hands of the division-rival New York Mets at Citi Field. The Nationals offense was moribund August 14 as New York threw an assortment of pitchers, only scoring a single run. Starter Andrew Alvarez pitched well for the Nationals, with five scoreless innings, before giving up two runs in the sixth inning and taking the loss. Washington overcame a short start by Brad Lord on August 15, as Lord only recorded two outs and could not make it out of the first inning, to take the lead on a three-run homer by Brady House off the left field foul pole in the sixth inning. House's go-ahead homer put long reliever Will Dion in line for the win, after Dion contributed 4 1/3 hitless innings while striking out seven Mets. Unfortunately for the Nationals, rookie Yovanny Cruz was unable to hold the lead in the ninth inning, with the Mets walking off on a single by veteran shortstop Francisco Lindor. In the series finale August 16, the Nationals scored first on a single by catcher Keibert Ruiz, then a home run by first baseman Abimelec Ortiz, but Ruiz's opposite number on the Mets, Luis Torrens, put his squad ahead for good with a two-run homer off Jake Irvin in the fourth inning. The series sweep in New York dropped the Nationals to six games below .500 for the first time all season.

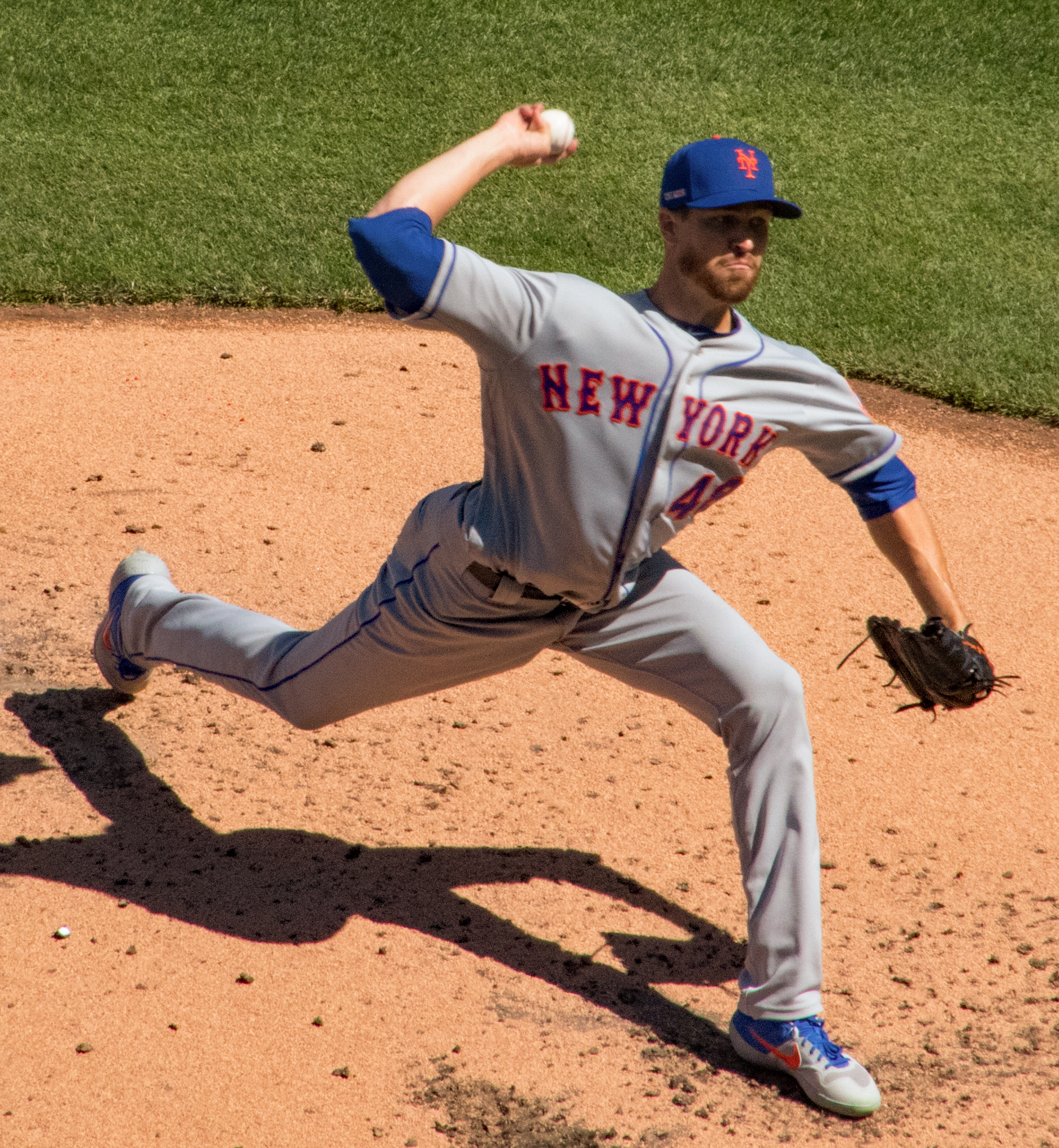
Longtime Nationals nemesis Jacob deGrom led a combined one-hitter of the Nationals in Texas on August 20, surpassing 2,000 career strikeouts in the game.

The Nationals and Texas Rangers traded shutouts at Globe Life Field. Texas' Cal Quantrill led a 5–0 blanking of the Nationals on August 18, as rookie Jackson Kent struggled in his second career start for Washington, giving up five earned runs in 3 2/3 innings to take the loss. The Nationals optioned Cruz after he pitched a scoreless inning of relief in the series opener, selecting the contract of 27-year-old lefty Erik Tolman to replace him in the bullpen. On August 19, Nationals ace Cade Cavalli struck out 11 Rangers in six shutout innings. (Note: Cavalli became the fourth pitcher in franchise history to pitch at least six scoreless innings with double-digit strikeouts in back-to-back starts, and the first since Max Scherzer in June 2015. (See "Nats' Cavalli follows near no-hitter with 11-K gem vs. Rangers", ESPN.com, August 19, 2026.)) The bullpen held the shutout the rest of the way for a 6–0 win, snapping a four-game losing streak and giving the Nationals their first win of the roadtrip. Designated hitter Andrés Chaparro and left fielder José Tena supplied the offense with home runs, including a three-run homer pulled inside the left field foul pole by Chaparro in the seventh inning. The Rangers sent veteran Jacob deGrom to the mound for the series finale August 20 despite nagging injury concerns that limited deGrom to two innings in his previous start. He gave up just one hit—a single by House that was the Nationals' only hit in the game—while striking out 10 in six innings, including his 2,000th career strikeout in the first inning, to earn the win.

The roadtrip ended with a three-game sweep at the hands of the Miami Marlins, as the Nationals' season-long struggles against the National League East Division continued. On August 21, the Nationals took the lead after five scoreless innings on a sixth-inning homer to right by catcher Keibert Ruiz and carried a combined one-hitter into the eighth inning. However, lefty setup man Tom Cosgrove was only able to get one out in the eighth, giving up a leadoff triple to center fielder Jakob Marsee before blowing the save on an RBI single by third baseman Javier Sanoja. Right-hander Clayton Beeter entered and allowed Sanoja to score on a second RBI single by shortstop Otto López. The Nationals tied the game with two outs in the ninth inning against Miami closer Pete Fairbanks, as left fielder Daylen Lile singled in center fielder Jacob Young. However, Beeter was unable to record an out in the bottom of the ninth, issuing a first-pitch walk to Marlins designated hitter Agustín Ramírez and committing a throwing error on an infield single to allow Ramírez to reach third base before Sanoja singled him home to walk off the struggling Nationals. On August 22, the Nationals were unable to dig out of an early hole, as Irvin allowed four runs in six innings of work to take the loss. Tolman made his major league debut in relief of Irvin, firing a scoreless inning and striking out the first Marlin he faced, right fielder Esteury Ruiz. The Marlins finished off the sweep and sent the Nationals to a 1–8 record on the long roadtrip August 23. While Kent pitched into the fifth inning having only allowed one run—thanks in part to an athletic catch by Young, who scaled the center field wall to rob Marlins left fielder Heriberto Hernández of extra bases and then doubled off López at first base to end the third inning—he was relieved after 4 2/3 innings with two runners on base, both of whom long reliever Trevor Williams allowed to score, ultimately saddling the Nationals' rookie starter with the loss. Williams and Max Kranick combined to give up three more runs for a 6–2 final score, dropping Washington to 10 games under .500.

==== 11th homestand (part one): Colorado and Miami ====
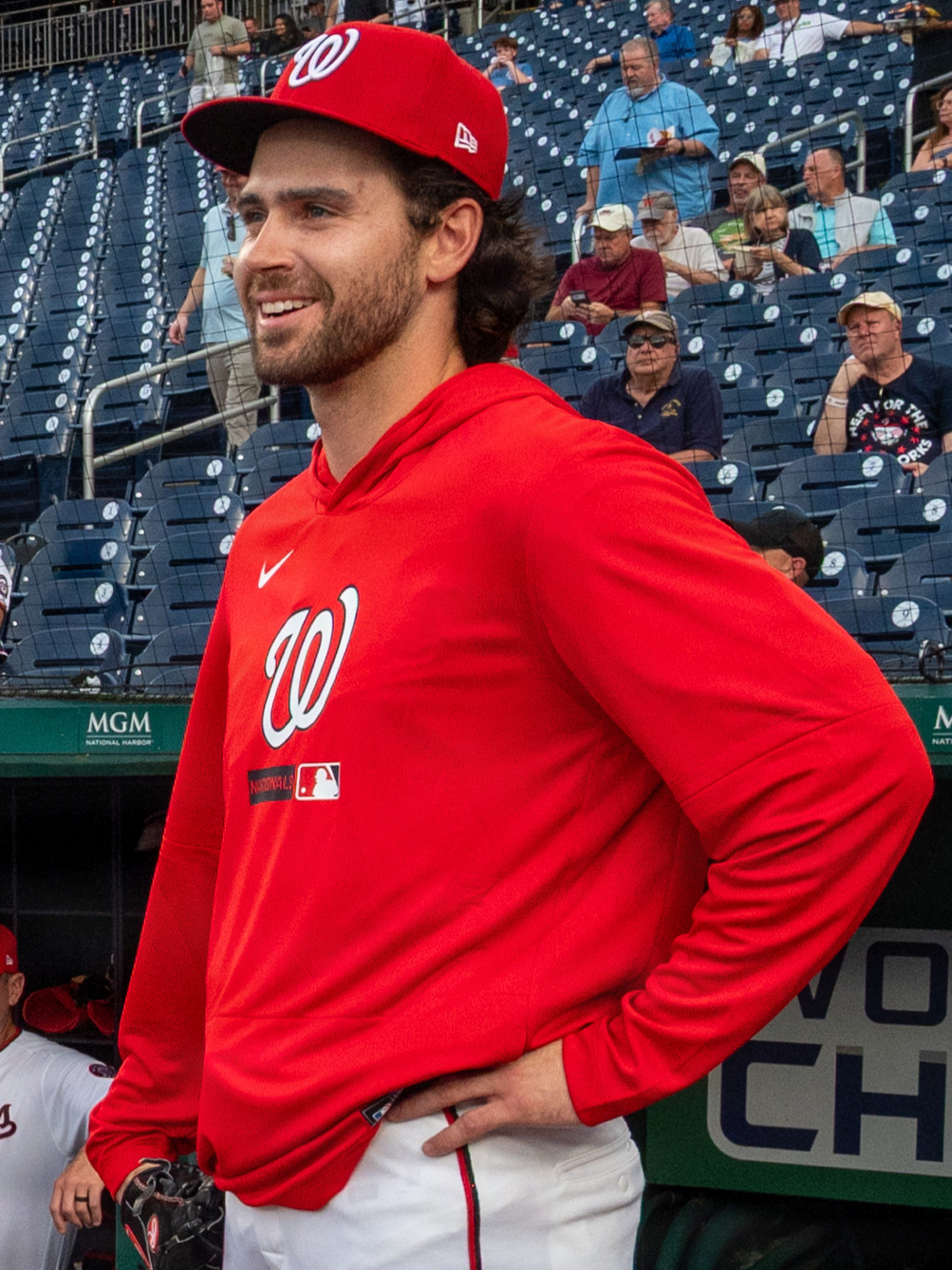
Tom Cosgrove picked up the win in relief August 27, only the second in his career after he earned a win in his 2023 major league debut.

The Nationals opened their longest homestand of the year with a series split versus the Colorado Rockies. After getting off to a slow start in the series opener August 24, the Nationals' moribund offense roared to life, erupting for five runs in the fifth inning, three runs in the sixth, two runs in the seventh, and three more in the eighth on a home run by left fielder Daylen Lile. Ace Cade Cavalli was not as sharp as he was in his previous two starts, but he worked through six innings of two-run ball, earning the win in the 13–3 drubbing. After the 13-run outburst in the opener, the Nationals could manage no offense in the next two games except a solo homer in each: Lile again on August 25, then Andrés Chaparro, starting at third base for the first time in his major league career, on August 26. The August 25 game was a low-scoring affair, with the Rockies getting to starter Andrew Alvarez for three runs in 4 2/3 innings to snap a seven-game losing streak. In the August 26 game, the Rockies blew out Washington, 13–1. Lefty reliever Will Dion took his first major league loss after giving up four runs on two homers, by Rockies designated hitter Troy Johnston and center fielder Cole Carrigg, in the fifth inning. Dion's outing was sandwiched between two scoreless innings from right-hander Matt Waldron—making his team debut (Note: Waldron became the first starting pitcher in Nationals team history to employ a knuckleball as part of his arsenal, throwing 12 in the August 26 game. (See Zuckerman, Mark, "Rock bottom?", Nats Journal, August 26, 2026.)) after the Nationals claimed him off waivers and designated veteran swingman Trevor Williams for assignment—and a more adventurous major league debut for pitching prospect Luis Perales, who was called up after reliever Jake Bird, who pitched in the first two games of the series, was optioned. After relieving Dion and working out of a jam in the fifth, Perales pitched a scoreless sixth before loading the bases and surrendering a grand slam to Rockies second baseman Connor Norby with two outs in the seventh. Utility infielder Jorbit Vivas finished the game on the mound for the Nationals. While speaking favorably of Perales after the game, manager Blake Butera called out the Nationals' overall effort, saying the team "did not play all that hard" in the blowout loss. The Nationals came out stronger August 27 in the series finale, scoring twice in the first inning to stick Rockies starter Gabriel Hughes with the loss and adding five more runs later on, including three on a double by third baseman Brady House and a homer by catcher Keibert Ruiz with two out in the eighth inning. Reliever Tom Cosgrove earned his first win since his major league debut in April 2023, becoming the first pitcher besides Cavalli to record a win for Washington in over two weeks.

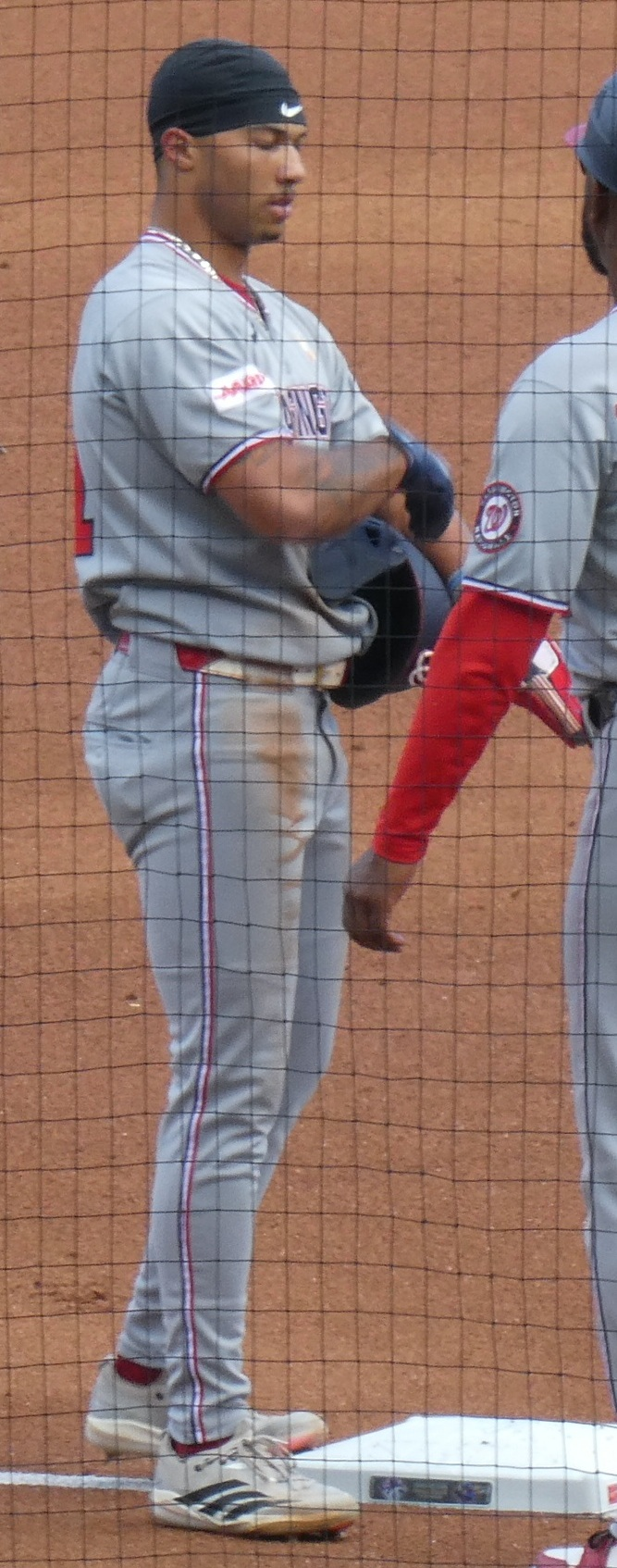
Outfielder Daylen Lile earned his first Major League Baseball Player of the Week Award on August 31, going on to homer twice that day and lead the Nationals to a series win.

The Nationals next hosted the division-rival Miami Marlins, winning three of four to take the series. Rookie Jackson Kent picked up his first career win August 28, pitching seven innings of one-run ball. The Nationals broke through in the third inning, scoring five runs off Marlins ace Eury Pérez—three of them on a long home run by House (Note: House's August 28 home run was originally measured by Statcast at 474 feet (144 m), which would have been the longest home run on record by a National at Nationals Park. However, the distance was later revised down to 445 feet (136 m). (See Sallick, Sam, "Brady House’s insane home run showcased his tantalizing power upside", Federal Baseball, August 29, 2026.))—who took the loss. Cavalli pitched four innings and struck out eight Marlins without surrendering a hit August 29, but he came out of the game after being hit on the leg by a comebacker off the bat of Miami third baseman Javier Sanoja, which he was able to field to end the fourth inning but left him noticeably limping afterward. After two scoreless innings by rookie Erik Tolman, the Nationals bullpen coughed up the four-run lead. The Marlins rallied to tie the game against Cosgrove and swingman Brad Lord, who gave up a two-run homer to left fielder Heriberto Hernández upon entering the game. The Miami bullpen confounded the Nationals into the 10th inning, as reliever Michael Petersen quickly retired shortstop CJ Abrams and first baseman Abimelec Ortiz in extra innings before walking the next two batters to load the bases. Center fielder Dylan Crews laced a single past the reach of Marlins second baseman Xavier Edwards to deliver Washington's first walkoff win of the year. Reliever Orlando Ribalta, who tossed a scoreless top of the 10th inning, earned his first career win. On August 30, the Nationals took a shutout into the ninth inning behind six strong innings from Alvarez. Handed a two-run lead for the save situation, reliever Max Kranick walked the bases loaded and was pulled in favor of Cosgrove, who hit the first batter he faced to force in a run. The Marlins took the lead when catcher Joe Mack hit a sacrifice fly to rookie center fielder Andrew Pinckney, who fired the relay throw past Vivas at third base and into the Marlins' dugout, with Vivas making no effort to field the throw and Cosgrove failing to back up the play. After scoring insurance runs on a double steal of home followed by a two-run homer by shortstop Otto López, Miami closed out a 6–2 loss for the home team. The game marked Abrams' team debut at second base. Stymied for the first three innings of the August 31 series finale by Dion, the Marlins pounced on Perales in the fourth inning, scoring three runs against the hard-throwing rookie to take the lead. Lile hit a two-run homer off Marlins reliever Jack Ralston to trim the deficit to one in the fifth inning, then another off Josh Ekness for the lead in the seventh inning. The Nationals pulled their swingman Waldron after three scoreless innings when he loaded the bases with nobody out in his fourth inning of work, putting in Tolman, who struck out Miami first baseman Kyle Stowers before inducing a double play from third baseman Leo Jiménez to end the threat. Tolman struck out the side in the ninth inning to complete his first career save. Vivas, who started at second base for Washington, was pulled from the game by Butera after failing to run out a popup in the bottom of the fourth inning. Meanwhile, Lile was awarded the Player of the Week Award in the National League after reaching base 16 times over the previous week with three homers, subsequently reaching four more times and adding two more homers in the August 31 win.

The Nationals went 11–18 in August, falling off the pace they set over the first four months of the season to end the month with a 66–74 record that ranked fourth in the National League East Division.

=== September ===
==== 11th homestand (part two): Atlanta ====
With rosters expanding September 1, the Nationals selected the contracts of infield prospect Yohandy Morales and pitching prospect Jared Simpson from the Class-AAA Rochester Red Wings, promoting them to the major league roster. Injured catcher Drew Millas moved to the 60-day injured list to clear roster space. Both Morales and Simpson starred in the Nationals' series opener that night against the division-rival Atlanta Braves. Morales had three hits, including a home run off Atlanta starting pitcher AJ Smith-Shawver in his second at-bat, (Note: Morales joined outfielder Andrew Pinckney, who debuted in August, in homering for his first major league hit with the 2026 Nationals. (See Nusbaum, Spencer, "Nationals’ Yohandy Morales homers in his major-league debut", The Athletic, September 1, 2026.)) to lead the offense in the 9–5 win. Simpson relieved starter Jake Irvin in the fourth inning, inheriting a two-on, no-outs jam, and fired three perfect innings to earn his first major league win. (Note: Simpson was the first Nationals pitcher since Aaron Barrett in March 2014 to be credited with a win in relief while making his major league debut—as well as only the second pitcher in MLB history to earn a win while debuting along with a teammate, Yohandy Morales, who homered in the same game, after Ryan Speier (alongside Jeff Baker) for the 2005 Colorado Rockies. (See Zuckerman, Mark, "A dazzling debut for rookie duo", Nats Journal, September 1, 2026)) The Nationals optioned outfielder Andrew Pinckney back to Rochester after the game and designated lefty reliever Tom Cosgrove for assignment, activating star outfielder James Wood after nearly a month on the injured list with an oblique strain and recalling rookie right-hander Riley Cornelio for the September 2 series finale. Cornelio took the loss in the finale, giving up a three-run homer to Braves catcher Sean Murphy in the sixth inning while working in long relief of starter Brad Lord, who exited in the fourth inning after a rain delay. Shut out 9–0, the Nationals were held to two hits in the game, with Wood breaking up a combined no-hitter with a single in the sixth inning. Utility player José Tena made his pitching debut in the ninth inning for the Nationals, giving up a run. Right-handed pitcher Max Kranick was designated for assignment after giving up four runs in relief, continuing a string of rough outings.

==== 12th roadtrip: Los Angeles and San Diego ====
Back on the road again for a West Coast trip, the Nationals were summarily swept in a three-game series with the Los Angeles Dodgers, going winless for the season against the two-time reigning world champions. Shut out over the first eight innings, the Nationals rallied in the ninth September 4, with first baseman Abimelec Ortiz, second baseman Jorbit Vivas, and right fielder James Wood driving in runs to bring designated hitter Andrés Chaparro to bat as the potential tying run. Chaparro lined out to right to end the game, a 5–3 loss. Reliever Jack Sinclair, selected from Class-AAA Rochester to join the bullpen that day, made his major league debut with a perfect eighth inning. Rookie starter Jackson Kent took the loss for the Nationals, giving up three earned runs—all of them scoring in a wobbly third frame—in five innings. Nationals ace Cade Cavalli delivered a quality start in the second game of the series, allowing two runs over six innings and exiting in line for the win. In the bottom of the seventh inning, however, struggling reliever Clayton Beeter threw a hanging slider to Dodgers center fielder Tommy Edman, who pulled the ball into the right field stands for a go-ahead three-run homer. The Dodgers tacked on another run when Sinclair, entering in relief of fellow rookie Erik Tolman in the eighth, walked Dodgers second baseman Alex Freeland to load the bases before hitting left fielder Alex Call on the elbow with a pitch. Again, the Nationals rallied in the ninth inning, with left fielder Daylen Lile singling in Wood with two outs and Chaparro doubling to put the tying run 90 feet away from home plate, but Dodgers closer Tanner Scott struck out slumping shortstop CJ Abrams to end the game. The Nationals jumped on Los Angeles starter Justin Wrobleski in the fourth inning for four runs, including Abrams' 30th home run of the season, but the Dodgers counterpunched to tie the game against reliever Brad Lord in the fifth. Washington went back on top when right fielder Dylan Crews was hit by a pitch with the bases loaded, but the Dodgers pinned yet another blown save on the Nationals as shortstop Mookie Betts hit a two-out, three-run homer off rookie Will Dion in the eighth inning, giving the game its final score of 7–5. Manager Blake Butera disclosed after the game that right-hander Orlando Ribalta, his most trusted late-inning reliever at that point, had reported forearm discomfort during warmups and was not available.

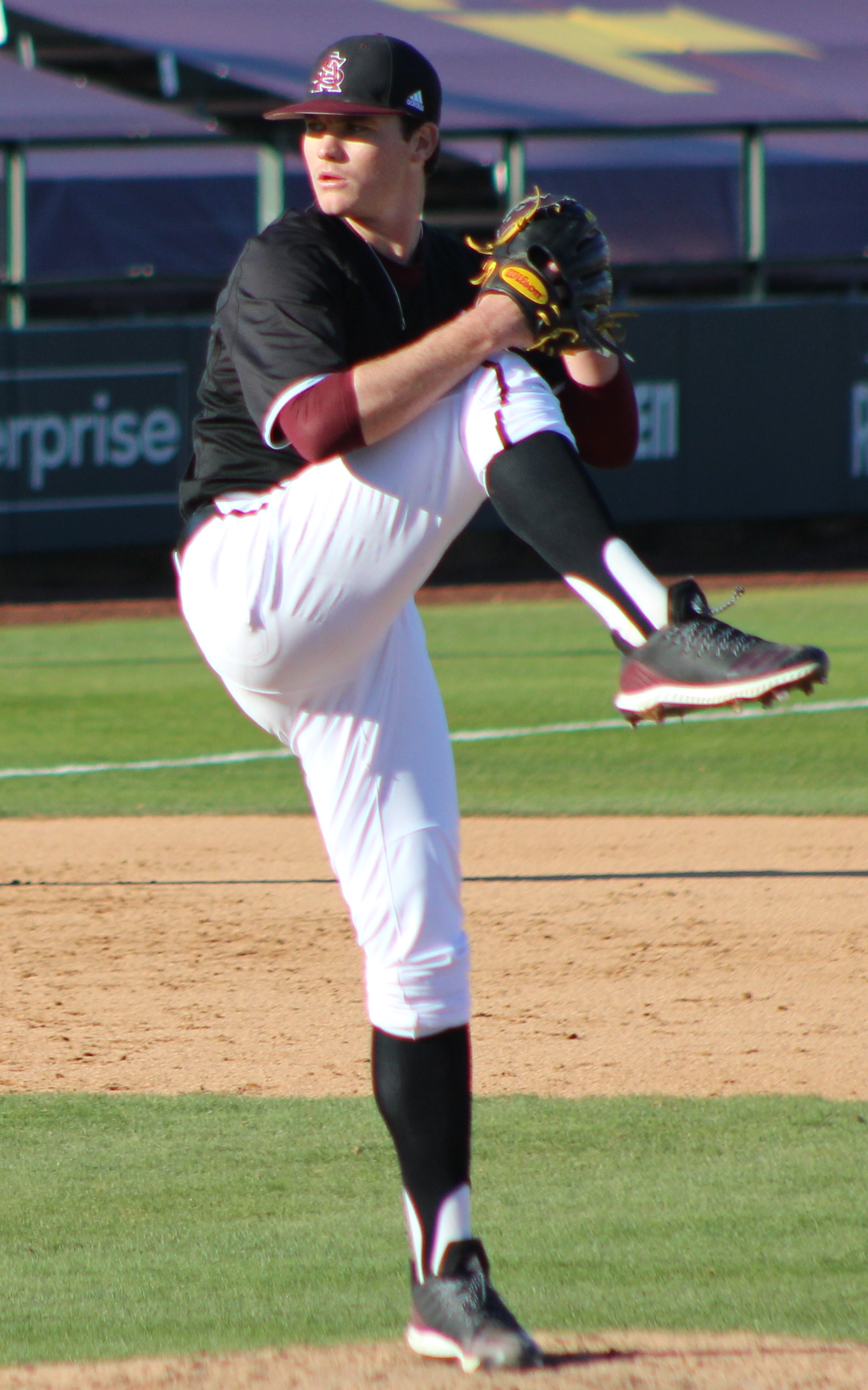
Reliever Erik Tolman was tagged with the Nationals' 38th blown save of the season September 8, breaking a previous record set by the 2024 Chicago White Sox.

The Nationals concluded a winless roadtrip with three games visiting the San Diego Padres. Before the start of the series, they placed Ribalta on the injured list with forearm inflammation and recalled rookie Yovanny Cruz to replace him in the bullpen. In the September 7 series opener, making his return from the injured list for San Diego, veteran Nick Pivetta outdueled the Nationals' Jake Irvin, pitching five shutout innings for the win. Irvin pitched into the sixth inning, but he allowed three runs over the first three innings, taking the loss. The Nationals' only score of the game came on a two-run homer by Crews in the sixth inning. Swingman Matt Waldron, who did not appear in the game, was subsequently placed on the injured list with chest inflammation, the Nationals recalling right-hander Zak Kent to replace him. The Nationals started rookie right-hander Riley Cornelio for a bullpen game September 8. While Cornelio delivered three perfect innings and the rest of the pitching staff held a lead into the eighth inning, the Padres took the lead with four runs in the eighth inning off recent callups Jared Simpson and Erik Tolman, (Note: The September 8 blown save—credited to Tolman, although Simpson loaded the bases without retiring a batter before Tolman entered the game—was the Nationals' 38th of the season, a new MLB record for blown saves by a team in a single season, eclipsing the previous record of 37 by the 2024 Chicago White Sox. (See Camerato, Jessica, "Nationals' bullpen game unravels in record-setting loss", MLB.com, September 8, 2026.)) with the eventual winning run scoring on a bloop into no-man's-land by Padres designated hitter Luis Campusano that fell in between the center fielder, right fielder, and second baseman. After pitching two scoreless innings in the September 8 game, Zak Kent was optioned and relief prospect Eddy Yean recalled for his third major league stint. The Padres completed the sweep September 9, shrugging off two early Nationals runs with nine unanswered from the third inning onward, taking advantage of defensive miscues as well as mistakes by Jackson Kent and Washington's beleaguered bullpen. Butera was ejected in the third inning for arguing a check-swing call on Padres first baseman Ty France, after umpire Emil Jiménez ruled France had not offered at a Kent curveball in the dirt for the strikeout. France then singled in a run, the first of three the Padres scored in the inning to saddle Kent with the loss. The Nationals' seven-game losing streak matched a season high.

==== 12th homestand: Los Angeles and Philadelphia ====
After a discouraging roadtrip that dropped them to the threshold of a seventh consecutive losing season, the Nationals bounced back with a three-game series sweep hosting the Los Angeles Angels at Nationals Park. Before the series, the Nationals placed shortstop Nasim Nuñez on the bereavement list, recalling outfielder Andrew Pinckney to replace him on the roster. Washington came from behind late to steal a win in the series opener September 11. Ace Cade Cavalli allowed just one run through six innings, on a solo homer by Angels center fielder Mike Trout in the first inning, but when manager Blake Butera sent him out for the seventh inning, he walked the first two batters before giving up a go-ahead RBI double to Angels second baseman Christian Moore. The Nationals rallied against reliever Samy Natera Jr. in the eighth inning, with Pinckney lofting a pinch-hit sacrifice fly before second baseman Jorbit Vivas doubled into the right field corner, driving in two more runs. Rookie Erik Tolman, thrust into the closer role, allowed a run in the ninth inning on a double by Moore that nearly cleared the high wall in right-center, but he retired pinch-hitter Kyren Paris to secure the save. Erstwhile closer Clayton Beeter picked up the win with a scoreless eighth inning, before being optioned to Class-AAA Rochester after the game, clearing a roster spot for Washington to activate lefty Richard Lovelady off the 60-day injured list. Andrew Alvarez held the Angels to one hit over seven innings September 12, while the Nationals got to flamethrowing Angels starter Walbert Ureña for four early runs. Called upon to cover the eighth inning for Washington, right-hander Brad Lord gave back three of those runs, before light-hitting third baseman Denzer Guzmán tied the game in the ninth with an RBI double off southpaw Will Dion and pinch-hitter Moises Ballesteros drove him in with a sacrifice fly. The Nationals battled back again in the bottom of the ninth against Angels closer Ben Joyce, with pinch-hitter José Tena walking, stealing second base, advancing to third on an error, and scoring on first baseman Andrés Chaparro's single into the left-center field gap. Rookie Jack Sinclair worked around a leadoff walk for a scoreless 10th inning, placing him in line for his first career win. The Nationals walked off in the bottom of the 10th on a groundball by catcher Harry Ford that Angels shortstop Zach Neto could not handle, allowing his Nationals counterpart CJ Abrams to scamper home from third. While pleased with the win, Butera acknowledged the frustration of yet another blown save in his postgame comments, adding that he would look at ways to use his relievers more effectively. The Nationals reinstated Nuñez and optioned rookie reliever Eddy Yean before the September 13 series opener, giving them an extended bench. The Nationals came from behind to tie the game September 13, then again to win it. Rookie Riley Cornelio opened for usual starter Jake Irvin, who gave up two runs in his first five innings—with a third run charged to him in the eighth inning, after he walked Neto and was relieved by Tolman, who allowed Neto to score on a wild pitch. Both teams took advantage of defensive issues, with the Nationals tying the game in the sixth inning on a groundball by pinch-hitter Brady House that could have been an inning-ending double play, and the Angels retaking the lead on the wild pitch and a Ballesteros sacrifice fly in the eighth inning after the shortstop Abrams botched another possible double-play ball. The Nationals seized their first lead of the game in the bottom of the eighth, after left fielder Daylen Lile tripled in a run, Vivas drove Lile in with a pinch-hit single, center fielder Jacob Young doubled in Vivas, and designated hitter Dylan Crews singled in Young. Armed with a two-run lead, Sinclair gave up a leadoff double to Angels right fielder Josh Lowe in the ninth inning, and although Lowe came around to score, Sinclair did not allow another hit and struck out Neto to record his first career save and secure the series sweep. Tolman was credited with the win, the first of his career. Despite the sweep, the Nationals were eliminated from playoff contention, as the San Diego Padres defeated the San Francisco Giants on September 13 to mathematically bury them.

The Nationals extended their winning streak to four with another late eruption to open a two-game series versus the division-rival Philadelphia Phillies. In the September 15 game, rookie Nationals starter Jackson Kent gave up three runs in five innings but was able to keep the game close. The Nationals lineup rallied to pin a loss on Phillies ace Cristopher Sánchez, equalizing on a fifth-inning homer by Chaparro before taking the lead in the seventh on a three-run pinch-hit homer by Lile, off reliever Jonathan Bowlan, after Sánchez loaded the bases. Washington dropped the second game 3–0, after opener Jared Simpson walked four Phillies and allowed two runs while getting just a single out. Neither lineup was able to effect much offense for the rest of the game, despite the Nationals walking 13 Phillies in total. (Note: The 13 walks issued by Nationals pitchers September 16 were the most in a single game since August 2024, tying a franchise record. (See Zuckerman, Mark, "Final: Phillies 3, Nats 0", bsky.app, September 16, 2026, and Martinez-Lopez, Melanie, "Nats show fight despite issuing 13 walks to Angels", MLB.com, August 11, 2024.)) The loss officially sealed a losing season for Washington. Pinckney was optioned back to Rochester immediately after the game.

==== 13th roadtrip: St. Louis and Detroit ====
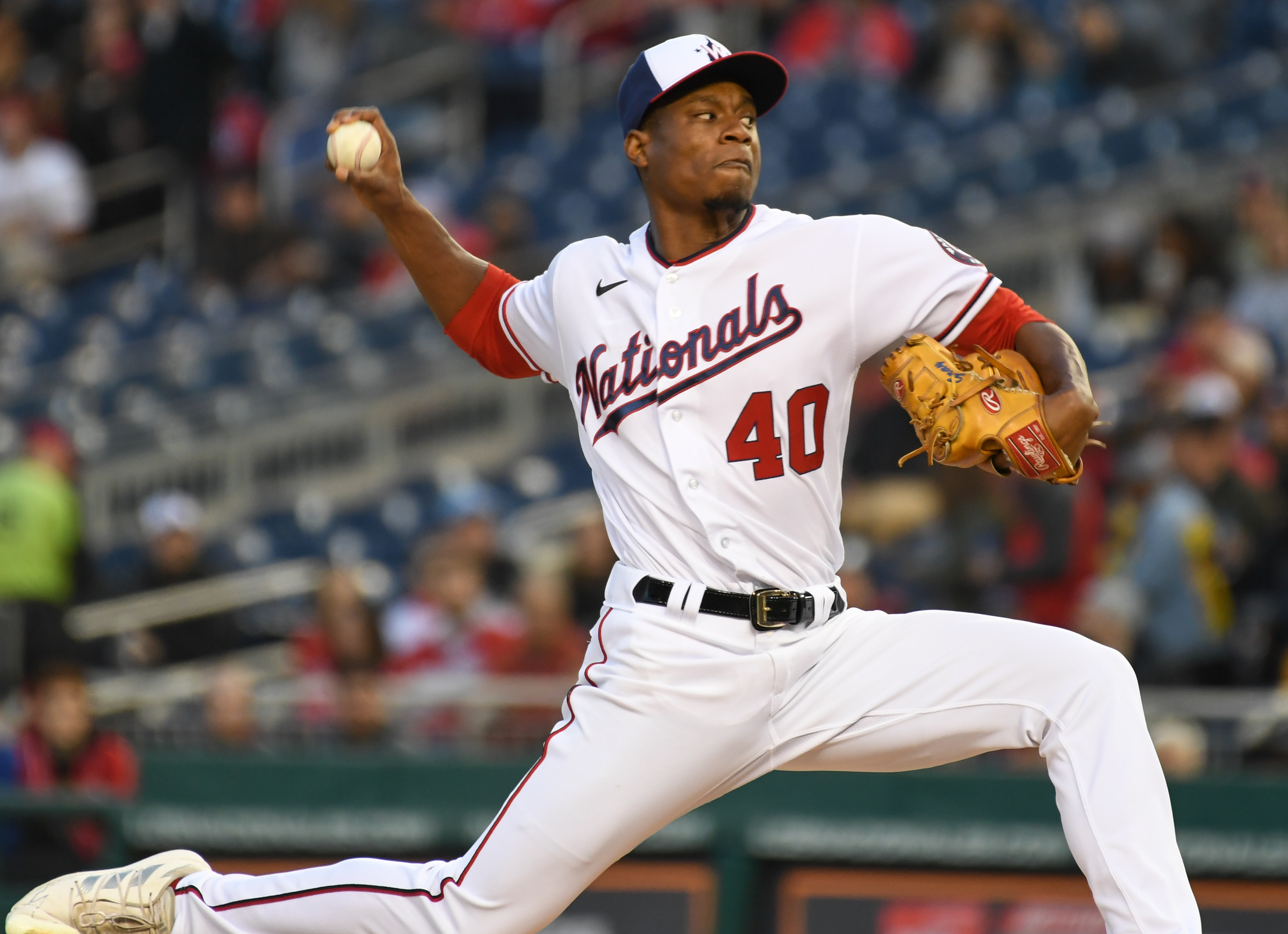
Pitcher Josiah Gray, the longest-tenured Nationals player, returned to a major league mound for the first time in nearly three seasons on September 18.

Ahead of the Nationals' final roadtrip of the 2026 season, visiting the St. Louis Cardinals before an interleague series with the Detroit Tigers, the Nationals activated right-handed pitcher Josiah Gray—who last pitched for Washington in April 2024—off the 60-day injured list. A starter throughout his career, Gray rehabbed as a reliever after being shut down in spring training with forearm inflammation. The Nationals also unveiled a $47 million contract extension with ace Cade Cavalli, buying out their star pitcher's arbitration seasons and up to two of his free agent seasons.

Hours after signing his contract extension, Cavalli reached the 200-strikeout mark (Note: Cavalli became the first Nationals pitcher with at least 200 strikeouts in a single season since the 2019 season, when Patrick Corbin, Max Scherzer, and Stephen Strasburg all accomplished the feat. (See "Cade Cavalli's breakout season continues", MLB on Facebook, September 18, 2026.)) in the September 18 series opener in St. Louis, firing five shutout innings and earning the win. Shortstop CJ Abrams stole second base in a three-run first inning for the Nationals, his 30th steal of the season. (Note: Abrams became only the second player in Nationals team history with at least 30 home runs and 30 stolen bases in a single season, after Alfonso Soriano in 2006. (See "CJ Abrams joins 30-30 club as Nationals rout Cardinals 9-1", ABC News, September 18, 2026.)) Gray made his season debut out of the bullpen, throwing a scoreless ninth inning to wrap up a 9–1 win. The Nationals won in extra innings September 19, with relievers Richard Lovelady and Erik Tolman combining to give back a 3–0 lead that the visitors built behind six innings of no-run, eight-strikeout ball from starter Andrew Alvarez. The Nationals and Cardinals traded single runs in the 10th inning before Washington erupted for four runs in the 11th inning. Swingman Riley Cornelio loaded the bases with nobody out in the bottom of the 11th before striking out the next two batters and ceding the mound to lefty Will Dion, who collected the final out for his first career save. Manager Blake Butera removed right fielder James Wood on defense after he jogged out a groundball in the ninth inning, with Wood admitting after the game that he ought to have "set an example" by running harder on the play. The Nationals suffered another blown save in the September 20 series finale, and this time, they were unable to recover. After Abrams hit a two-run homer off Cardinals starter Quinn Mathews to put the Nationals on top in the sixth inning, Tolman surrendered a game-tying home run by designated hitter Iván Herrera in the eighth inning, and then rookie catcher Leo Bernal socked a two-run homer off Yovanny Cruz for the lead. St. Louis closer Riley O'Brien retired the side in order to deny the Nationals a sweep. After the game, the Nationals optioned rookie left-hander Jared Simpson, giving their affiliated Class-AAA Rochester Red Wings an additional arm ahead of the International League playoffs. (Note: Washington's highest-level minor league affiliate clinched a playoff spot September 20, the last day of the regular season for Triple-A teams, giving the Rochester Red Wings their first playoff appearance since 2013. (See Evans, Kyle, "Rochester Red Wings clinch first playoff berth since 2013", FingerLakes1.com, September 20, 2026.))

Another pitcher returned from the 60-day injured list to start the September 21 series opener in Detroit: left-hander DJ Herz, who missed the entire 2025 season after undergoing Tommy John surgery. The Nationals released reliever Cole Henry to clear a roster spot for Herz. Herz took the loss in his season debut, pitching four innings against the Tigers but giving up two runs in the first inning and two runs in the fourth. The Nationals took the second game of the series September 22. After Cornelio provided 2 2/3 scoreless innings as the opener, regular starter Jackson Kent took over, giving up just one unearned run in four innings on a wild pitch. Jack Sinclair safely delivered a two-run lead—supplied by two homers by the second baseman Abrams, who eclipsed 100 RBIs for the season (Note: Abrams became the first Nationals player to drive in at least 100 runs in a season since Anthony Rendon and Juan Soto in 2019. (See Zuckerman, Mark, "Instant Analysis: Nats 3, Tigers 1", Nats Journal, September 22, 2026.))—to Tolman, who closed out the game in the ninth inning. Kent, who earned the win, was optioned immediately after the game. Washington recalled reliever Gus Varland for the September 23 series finale, a bullpen game with Lovelady as the opener. The Nationals bullpen again held down the Tigers as Washington took the rubber game, 4–2. A scoreless game moved in the Nationals' favor with a three-run sixth inning, capped by first baseman Yohandy Morales's two-run homer deep to right-center field. Dion gave back one of those runs immediately on a solo shot by Detroit right fielder Ben Malgeri, but shortstop Nasim Nuñez manufactured a fourth run for Washington in the seventh, stealing second and third on back-to-back pitches before scoring on a Wood groundout. (Note: With his first stolen base of the September 23 game, Nuñez moved ahead of CJ Abrams—who stole 47 bases in the Nationals' 2023 season—to set a new team record for stolen bases in a season. (See "Nasim Nuñez swipes two bases, sets Nationals record", MLB.com, September 23, 2026.)) With the Nationals' lead back at three runs, Cruz picked up the last four outs, allowing one more run to score on a Malgeri single in the ninth before slamming the door for his first career save.

==== 13th homestand: New York ====
For their final three games of the season, the Nationals hosted the New York Mets. The Nationals won the first game, 7–6, on September 25. Washington's Andrew Alvarez had his worst start of the year, giving up two home runs for the first time in a game and exiting after allowing five runs in 4 2/3 innings. The Nationals took advantage of wildness by New York relievers Jonathan Pintaro and Cionel Pérez, who combined for four wild pitches, to take the lead with a four-run third inning. Gus Varland was credited with the win after finishing the fifth inning in relief of Alvarez and pitching a perfect sixth inning. The Nationals added an insurance run on a homer by right fielder Dylan Crews in the seventh inning, but setup man Jack Sinclair gave it back on a sac fly by Mets catcher Francisco Álvarez. Pitching at Nationals Park for the first time since April 2024, right-hander Josiah Gray converted his first major league save, clinching a superior team record for the Nationals over the division-rival Mets. The Nationals activated starting pitcher Connelly Early off the 60-day injured list for the second game of the series, optioning reliever Luis Perales to clear a roster spot. That September 26 game was rescheduled from a night game to an early matinee due to storms in the weather forecast. Early pitched three efficient innings in his Nationals debut. The Nationals carried a combined shutout into the seventh inning, until bulk reliever Jake Irvin gave up four runs with two outs, on homers by Mets center fielder A. J. Ewing and second baseman Ronny Mauricio. The Nationals failed to muster any offense except for a sacrifice fly by first baseman Abimelec Ortiz off New York starter Jonah Tong, losing 7–1. The final game of the Nationals season was also moved up to an early-afternoon start, with a nor'easter affecting the East Coast. Making his second and final start of the season, Nationals left-hander DJ Herz was roughed up for four runs in three innings, but the Washington bullpen held firm the rest of the way, and Washington's offense came from behind, scoring five unanswered runs. Nationals first baseman Andrés Chaparro homered twice off Mets starter Sean Manaea and drove in three runs, leading the Nationals in the 6–4 win to capture the series and end the season with a win.

The Nationals finished the season with a 77–85 record, fourth in the National League East Division, having played 11–11 ball in September.

=== Transactions ===
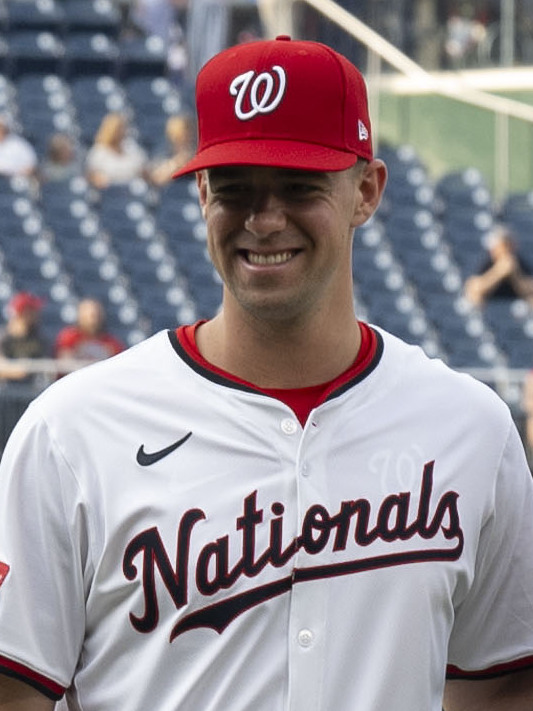
The Nationals cut ties with former first-round draft pick Jackson Rutledge, designating him for assignment May 5.

- March 28: The Nationals acquired infielder Curtis Mead from the Chicago White Sox for minor league catcher Boston Smith and designated left-handed pitcher Jake Eder for assignment.
- March 31: The Nationals released minor league first baseman Matt Mervis.
- April 1: The Nationals traded left-handed pitcher Jake Eder to the Los Angeles Dodgers for cash considerations.
- April 16: The Nationals acquired left-handed pitcher Richard Lovelady from the New York Mets for cash considerations.
- May 1: The Nationals signed right-handed pitcher Shawn Dubin to a minor league contract and traded minor league infielder Zack Short to the Detroit Tigers for cash considerations or a player to be named later.
- May 2: The Nationals outrighted left-handed pitcher Cionel Pérez to the minor leagues; Pérez elected free agency.
- May 3: The Nationals claimed right-handed pitcher Zak Kent off waivers from the Minnesota Twins.
- May 5: The Nationals signed right-handed pitcher Max Kranick to a one-year major league contract with a club option for the 2027 season and designated right-handed pitcher Jackson Rutledge for assignment; Rutledge was claimed off waivers by the Philadelphia Phillies.
- May 13: The Nationals signed left-handed pitcher Alex Young to a minor league contract.
- May 15: The Nationals released minor league pitcher Shawn Dubin.
- May 25: The Nationals acquired left-handed pitcher Carson Palmquist from the Colorado Rockies for cash considerations.
- June 12: The Nationals claimed right-handed pitcher Jhancarlos Lara off waivers from the Atlanta Braves and designated right-handed pitcher Julián Fernández for assignment; Fernández was released.
- June 15: The Nationals released minor league pitcher Shinnosuke Ogasawara.
- June 24: The Nationals claimed right-handed pitcher Justin Lawrence off waivers from the Minnesota Twins and designated right-handed pitcher Jhancarlos Lara for assignment; Lara was assigned outright to the minor leagues.
- July 1: The Nationals acquired right-handed pitcher Kyle Nicolas from the Baltimore Orioles for minor league infielder Randal Díaz.
- July 2: The Nationals signed left-handed pitcher Konnor Pilkington to a minor league contract and released minor league pitcher Trevor Gott.
- July 3: The Nationals acquired minor league pitcher Tom Cosgrove from the Houston Astros for cash considerations.
- July 4: The Nationals claimed left-handed pitcher Matt Krook off waivers from the Athletics and designated right-handed pitcher Andre Granillo for assignment; Granillo was claimed off waivers by the Detroit Tigers.
- July 5: The Nationals selected the contract of right-handed pitcher Eddy Yean and designated outfielder Robert Hassell III for assignment; Hassell was outrighted to the minor leagues.
- July 10: The Nationals selected the contract of left-handed pitcher Tom Cosgrove.
- July 12: The Nationals designated left-handed pitcher Matt Krook for assignment; Krook elected free agency.
- July 16: The Nationals traded minor league outfielder Robert Hassell III to the Pittsburgh Pirates for cash considerations or a player to be named later.
- July 19: The Nationals signed left-handed pitcher Matt Krook to a major league contract.
- July 21: The Nationals designated right-handed pitcher Justin Lawrence for assignment; Lawrence was outrighted to the minor leagues.
- July 25: The Nationals acquired left-handed pitcher Connelly Early from the Boston Red Sox for infielder Curtis Mead.
- July 27: The Nationals designated left-handed pitcher Matt Krook for assignment; Krook elected free agency.
- August 2: The Nationals acquired right-handed pitchers Jake Bird and Yovanny Cruz and minor league pitchers Jack Cebert and Ben Grable from the New York Yankees for first baseman Luis García Jr.
- August 3: The Nationals acquired left-handed pitcher Will Dion, minor league pitchers Josh Hartle and Kendeglys Virguez, and minor league outfielder Nick Mitchell from the Cleveland Guardians for left-handed pitcher Foster Griffin and minor league pitcher Joe Glassey from the Baltimore Orioles for outfielder Christian Franklin.
- August 4: The Nationals selected the contract of outfielder Andrew Pinckney, signed left-handed pitcher Matt Krook to a minor league contract, and released minor league pitchers Zach Penrod and Alex Young.
- August 5: The Nationals released outfielder Joey Wiemer and minor league pitcher Konnor Pilkington and designated right-handed pitcher Zack Littell for assignment; Littell was released.
- August 6: The Nationals claimed right-handed pitcher Wyatt Mills off waivers from the Los Angeles Dodgers.
- August 12: The Nationals selected the contract of left-handed pitcher Jackson Kent and designated right-handed pitcher Miles Mikolas for assignment; Mikolas was released.
- August 13: The Nationals signed shortstop Liover Peguero to a minor league contract.
- August 19: The Nationals selected the contract of left-handed pitcher Erik Tolman.
- August 22: The Nationals claimed right-handed pitcher Matt Waldron off waivers from the Toronto Blue Jays.
- August 25: The Nationals designated right-handed pitcher Trevor Williams for assignment; Williams was released.
- September 1: The Nationals selected the contracts of left-handed pitcher Jared Simpson and infielder Yohandy Morales.
- September 2: The Nationals signed infielder Buddy Kennedy to a minor league contract and designated left-handed pitcher Tom Cosgrove for assignment; Cosgrove was outrighted to the minor leagues.
- September 4: The Nationals selected the contract of right-handed pitcher Jack Sinclair and designated right-handed pitcher Max Kranick for assignment; Kranick was outrighted to the minor leagues.
- September 12: The Nationals claimed right-handed pitcher Chase Hampton off waivers from the New York Yankees.
- September 17: The Nationals released right-handed pitcher Wyatt Mills.
- September 18: The Nationals signed right-handed pitcher Cade Cavalli to a four-year major league contract extension with a team option for the 2031 season.
- September 21: The Nationals released right-handed pitcher Cole Henry.
- September 26: The Nationals designated right-handed pitcher Chase Hampton for assignment.

=== Major league debuts ===
- April 24: Riley Cornelio
- July 5: Eddy Yean
- July 12: Abimelec Ortiz
- August 5: Andrew Pinckney
- August 12: Jackson Kent
- August 22: Erik Tolman
- August 26: Luis Perales
- September 1: Yohandy Morales, Jared Simpson
- September 4: Jack Sinclair

== Overall ==
=== Season standings ===
==== National League East ====
NL East
Team	W	L	Pct.	GB	Home	Road
Atlanta Braves	94	68	.580	—	52‍–‍29	42‍–‍39
Philadelphia Phillies	88	74	.543	6	43‍–‍38	45‍–‍36
Miami Marlins	80	82	.494	14	47‍–‍34	33‍–‍48
Washington Nationals	77	85	.475	17	39‍–‍42	38‍–‍43
New York Mets	74	88	.457	20	36‍–‍45	38‍–‍43

==== National League Wild Card ====
Division leaders
Team	W	L	Pct.
Milwaukee Brewers	103	59	.636
Los Angeles Dodgers	100	62	.617
Atlanta Braves	94	68	.580

Wild Card teams (Top 3 teams qualify for postseason)
Team	W	L	Pct.	GB
San Diego Padres	91	71	.562	+3
Chicago Cubs	89	73	.549	+1
Philadelphia Phillies	88	74	.543	—
Arizona Diamondbacks	86	76	.531	2
Pittsburgh Pirates	82	80	.506	6
Miami Marlins	80	82	.494	8
St. Louis Cardinals	77	85	.475	11
Washington Nationals	77	85	.475	11
Cincinnati Reds	75	87	.463	13
New York Mets	74	88	.457	14
San Francisco Giants	65	97	.401	23
Colorado Rockies	58	104	.358	30

==== Record vs. opponents ====
2026 National League record Source: MLB Standings Grid – 2026
Team	AZ	ATL	CHC	CIN	COL	LAD	MIA	MIL	NYM	PHI	PIT	SD	SF	STL	WSH	AL
Arizona	—	4–3	2–4	4–2	9–4	7–6	1–5	2–4	4–2	3–3	3–3	6–7	10–3	5–2	2–4	24–24
Atlanta	3–4	—	3–3	3–3	6–0	5–1	9–4	3–3	6–7	9–4	5–1	3–4	1–5	2–4	9–4	27–21
Chicago	4–2	3–3	—	9–4	3–3	4–2	3–3	4–9	7–0	6–1	7–6	5–1	3–3	6–7	3–3	22–26
Cincinnati	2–4	3–3	4–9	—	4–2	1–6	3–4	4–9	4–2	3–3	6–7	3–3	3–3	5–8	1–5	29–19
Colorado	4–9	0–6	3–3	2–4	—	3–10	2–5	1–5	4–2	2–4	3–3	2–11	7–6	2–4	3–4	20–28
Los Angeles	6–7	1–5	2–4	6–1	10–3	—	2–4	3–4	5–1	4–2	5–1	8–5	9–4	2–4	6–0	31–17
Miami	5–1	4–9	3–3	4–3	5–2	4–2	—	1–5	6–7	5–8	4–2	0–6	4–2	4–2	9–4	22–26
Milwaukee	4–2	3–3	9–4	9–4	5–1	4–3	5–1	—	4–2	4–2	6–7	2–4	3–4	11–2	2–4	32–16
New York	2–4	7–6	0–7	2–4	2–4	1–5	7–6	2–4	—	6–7	4–2	4–2	5–2	2–4	7–6	23–25
Philadelphia	3–3	4–9	1–6	3–3	4–2	2–4	8–5	2–4	7–6	—	5–2	6–0	4–2	4–2	9–4	26–22
Pittsburgh	3–3	1–5	6–7	7–6	3–3	1–5	2–4	7–6	2–4	2–5	—	3–3	3–3	6–7	4–3	32–16
San Diego	7–6	4–3	1–5	3–3	11–2	5–8	6–0	4–2	2–4	0–6	3–3	—	9–4	3–4	4–2	29–19
San Francisco	3–10	5–1	3–3	3–3	6–7	4–9	2–4	4–3	2–5	2–4	3–3	4–9	—	5–1	3–3	16–32
St. Louis	2–5	4–2	7–6	8–5	4–2	4–2	2–4	2–11	4–2	2–4	7–6	4–3	1–5	—	3–3	23–25
Washington	4–2	4–9	3–3	5–1	4–3	0–6	4–9	4–2	6–7	4–9	3–4	2–4	3–3	3–3	—	28–20

Updated with the results of all games through September 27, 2026.

== Game log ==
Legend
	Nationals win
	Nationals loss
	Postponement
	Eliminated from playoff race
**Bold**	Nationals team member

2026 Game Log: 77–85 (Home: 39–42; Road: 38–43)
March/April: 15–17 (Home: 3–10; Road: 12–7)

#	Date	Opponent	Score	Win	Loss	Save	Attendance	Record	Streak
1	March 26	@ Cubs	10–4	**Lord** (1–0)	Boyd (0–1)	—	39,712	1–0	W1
2	March 28	@ Cubs	2–10	Horton (1–0)	**Mikolas** (0–1)	—	34,834	1–1	L1
3	March 29	@ Cubs	6–3	**Irvin** (1–0)	Imanaga (1–0)	**Beeter** (1)	33,559	2–1	W1
4	March 30	@ Phillies	13–2	**Griffin** (1–0)	Walker (0–1)	—	35,609	3–1	W2
5	March 31	@ Phillies	2–3	Painter (1–0)	**Littell** (0–1)	Durán (2)	40,709	3–2	L1
6	April 1	@ Phillies	5–6 (10)	Durán (1–1)	**Henry** (0–1)	—	37,469	3–3	L2
7	April 3	Dodgers	6–13	Sheehan (1–0)	**Mikolas** (0–2)	—	41,161	3–4	L3
8	April 4	Dodgers	5–10	Glasnow (1–0)	**Irvin** (1–1)	—	40,046	3–5	L4
9	April 5	Dodgers	6–8	Dreyer (1–0)	**Pérez** (0–1)	Díaz (3)	24,899	3–6	L5
10	April 6	Cardinals	9–6	**Pérez** (1–1)	Svanson (0–1)	—	12,319	4–6	W1
11	April 7	Cardinals	6–7 (10)	Soriano (1–0)	**Henry** (0–2)	O'Brien (3)	20,036	4–7	L1
12	April 8	Cardinals	1–6	McGreevy (1–1)	**Mikolas** (0–3)	—	12,686	4–8	L2
13	April 10	@ Brewers	7–3	**Poulin** (1–0)	Megill (0–2)	—	30,196	5–8	W1
14	April 11	@ Brewers	3–1	**Griffin** (2–0)	Harrison (1–1)	**Beeter** (2)	36,442	6–8	W2
15	April 12	@ Brewers	8–6	**Poulin** (2–0)	Zerpa (0–1)	**Varland** (1)	26,924	7–8	W3
16	April 13	@ Pirates	5–16	Skenes (3–1)	**Cavalli** (0–1)	—	11,532	7–9	L1
17	April 14	@ Pirates	5–4	**Parker** (1–0)	Keller (1–1)	**Varland** (2)	9,423	8–9	W1
18	April 15	@ Pirates	0–2	Mlodzinski (1–0)	**Irvin** (1–2)	Santana (2)	11,244	8–10	L1
19	April 16	@ Pirates	8–7 (10)	**Beeter** (1–0)	Santana (2–1)	**Ribalta** (1)	10,504	9–10	W1
20	April 17	Giants	5–10	Webb (2–2)	**Littell** (0–2)	—	25,108	9–11	L1
21	April 18	Giants	6–7 (12)	Kilian (1–0)	**Pérez** (1–2)	—	35,527	9–12	L2
22	April 19	Giants	3–0	**Alvarez** (1–0)	Ray (2–3)	—	20,026	10–12	W1
23	April 20	Braves	4–9	Elder (3–1)	**Irvin** (1–3)	—	12,022	10–13	L1
24	April 21	Braves	11–4	**Griffin** (3–0)	López (1–1)	—	16,483	11–13	W1
25	April 22	Braves	6–8	Lee (1–0)	**Littell** (0–3)	Suárez (2)	16,308	11–14	L1
26	April 23	Braves	2–7	Ritchie (1–0)	**Pérez** (1–3)	—	14,613	11–15	L2
27	April 24	@ White Sox	4–5	Leasure (2–0)	**Cornelio** (0–1)	Domínguez (6)	17,588	11–16	L3
28	April 25	@ White Sox	6–3 (10)	**Pérez** (2–3)	Leasure (2–1)	—	35,174	12–16	W1
29	April 26	@ White Sox	2–1 (10)	**Lovelady** (2–1)	Domínguez (1–3)	**Schultz** (1)	24,259	13–16	W2
30	April 28	@ Mets	0–8	Holmes (3–2)	**Littell** (0–4)	—	33,622	13–17	L1
31	April 29	@ Mets	14–2	**Cavalli** (1–1)	Peterson (0–4)	—	32,624	14–17	W1
32	April 30	@ Mets	5–4	**Parker** (2–0)	Weaver (2–1)	**Varland** (3)	34,621	15–17	W2

May: 16–12 (Home: 9–7; Road: 7–5)

#	Date	Opponent	Score	Win	Loss	Save	Attendance	Record	Streak
33	May 1	Brewers	1–6	Misiorowski (2–2)	**Irvin** (1–4)	—	19,764	15–18	L1
34	May 2	Brewers	1–4	Harrison (3–1)	**Griffin** (3–1)	Uribe (3)	25,287	15–19	L2
35	May 3	Brewers	3–2	**Littell** (1–4)	Henderson (0–1)	**Lovelady** (1)	17,220	16–19	W1
36	May 5	Twins	3–11	Bradley (4–1)	**Cavalli** (1–2)	—	17,844	16–20	L1
37	May 6	Twins	15–2	**Mikolas** (1–3)	Ober (3–2)	—	17,444	17–20	W1
38	May 7	Twins	7–5	**Poulin** (3–0)	Klein (0–1)	**Varland** (4)	13,543	18–20	W2
39	May 8	@ Marlins	3–2	**Griffin** (4–1)	Snelling (0–1)	**Poulin** (1)	12,070	19–20	W3
40	May 9	@ Marlins	7–8	Nardi (3–2)	**Parker** (2–1)	King (1)	20,185	19–21	L1
41	May 10	@ Marlins	2–5	Faucher (4–2)	**Varland** (0–1)	Ekness (1)	11,848	19–22	L2
42	May 12	@ Reds	10–4	**Lord** (2–0)	Singer (2–3)	—	23,715	20–22	W1
43	May 13	@ Reds	8–7 (10)	**Varland** (1–1)	Santillan (1–2)	**Poulin** (2)	17,312	21–22	W2
44	May 14	@ Reds	1–15	Burns (5–1)	**Griffin** (4–2)	—	22,651	21–23	L1
45	May 15	Orioles	3–2	**Littell** (2–4)	Baz (1–5)	**Lovelady** (2)	38,912	22–23	W1
46	May 16	Orioles	13–3	**Cavalli** (2–2)	Bassitt (3–3)	—	40,559	23–23	W2
47	May 17	Orioles	3–7	Nunez (2–0)	**Lovelady** (2–2)	—	26,715	23–24	L1
48	May 18	Mets	7–16 (12)	Brazobán (3–1)	**Schultz** (0–1)	—	15,901	23–25	L2
49	May 19	Mets	9–6	**Griffin** (5–2)	McLean (2–3)	**Lovelady** (3)	22,754	24–25	W1
50	May 20	Mets	8–4	**Littell** (3–4)	Thornton (0–1)	**Alvarez** (1)	18,642	25–25	W2
51	May 21	Mets	1–2	Peterson (3–4)	**Cavalli** (2–3)	Williams (7)	17,291	25–26	L1
52	May 22	@ Braves	4–5 (11)	Kinley (4–2)	**Schultz** (0–2)	—	36,082	25–27	L2
53	May 23	@ Braves	2–0	**Irvin** (2–4)	Holmes (3–2)	**Lovelady** (4)	35,819	26–27	W1
54	May 24	@ Braves	2–1	**Griffin** (6–2)	Pérez (2–3)	**Ribalta** (2)	36,429	27–27	W2
55	May 25	@ Guardians	10–2	**Littell** (4–4)	Bibee (0–7)	—	25,494	28–27	W3
56	May 26	@ Guardians	6–3	**Cavalli** (3–3)	Cantillo (4–2)	**Parker** (1)	21,473	29–27	W4
57	May 27	@ Guardians	2–3	Williams (8–3)	**Mikolas** (1–4)	Smith (19)	19,559	29–28	L1
58	May 29	Padres	5–7	Estrada (2–1)	**Parker** (2–2)	Miller (17)	26,529	29–29	L2
59	May 30	Padres	9–4	**Lord** (3–0)	King (4–4)	**Beeter** (3)	30,765	30–29	W1
60	May 31	Padres	4–2	**Littell** (5–4)	Canning (0–4)	**Beeter** (4)	24,050	31–29	W2

June: 13–14 (Home: 5–8; Road: 8–6)

#	Date	Opponent	Score	Win	Loss	Save	Attendance	Record	Streak
61	June 1	Marlins	3–7	Alcántara (4–4)	**Lovelady** (2–3)	—	11,808	31–30	L1
62	June 2	Marlins	3–7	King (2–1)	**Mikolas** (1–5)	—	19,751	31–31	L2
63	June 3	Marlins	1–4	Meyer (6–0)	**Beeter** (1–1)	Fairbanks (7)	16,695	31–32	L3
64	June 5	@ Diamondbacks	14–1	**Griffin** (7–2)	Kelly (5–4)	—	24,272	32–32	W1
65	June 6	@ Diamondbacks	6–1	**Littell** (6–4)	Rodríguez (5–2)	**Lord** (1)	30,638	33–32	W2
66	June 7	@ Diamondbacks	1–5	Soroka (8–3)	**Cavalli** (3–4)	—	35,540	33–33	L1
67	June 8	@ Giants	4–3	**Beeter** (2–1)	Winn (2–2)	**Varland** (5)	35,432	34–33	W1
68	June 9	@ Giants	6–3	**Lord** (4–0)	Houser (2–6)	—	35,493	35–33	W2
69	June 10	@ Giants	10–11	Sanmartín (1–0)	**Parker** (2–3)	—	32,459	35–34	L1
70	June 12	Mariners	2–10	Miller (3–0)	**Littell** (6–5)	—	22,226	35–35	L1
71	June 13	Mariners	8–3	**Cavalli** (4–4)	Castillo (2–6)	—	30,004	36–35	W1
72	June 14	Mariners	10–1	**Mikolas** (2–5)	Hancock (5–3)	—	27,264	37–35	W2
73	June 15	Royals	7–3	**Lord** (5–0)	Spence (0–1)	—	14,444	38–35	W3
74	June 16	Royals	6–4	**Schultz** (1–2)	Lynch IV (2–1)	**Varland** (6)	25,053	39–35	W4
75	June 17	Royals	2–6	Avila (2–3)	**Littell** (6–6)	—	17,643	39–36	L1
76	June 19	@ Rays	2–5	Jax (2–5)	**Mikolas** (2–6)	Baker (19)	17,134	39–37	L2
77	June 20	@ Rays	4–3	**Parker** (3–3)	Seymour (3–1)	**Beeter** (5)	20,996	40–37	W1
78	June 21	@ Rays	3–4	Cleavinger (2–2)	**Ribalta** (0–1)	Kelly (3)	21,054	40–38	L1
79	June 22	Phillies	4–1	**Griffin** (8–2)	Mayza (2–2)	**Beeter** (6)	18,237	41–38	W1
80	June 23	Phillies	9–14	Kerkering (4–0)	**Lord** (5–1)	—	29,611	41–39	L1
81	June 24	Phillies	4–5	Johnson (1–0)	**Lovelady** (2–4)	Durán (19)	27,200	41–40	L2
82	June 25	Phillies	5–10	Kerkering (5–0)	**Varland** (1–2)	—	28,919	41–41	L3
83	June 26	@ Orioles	1–3	Rogers (5–7)	**Alvarez** (1–1)	Helsley (8)	26,901	41–42	L4
84	June 27	@ Orioles	4–3 (10)	**Beeter** (3–1)	Helsley (0–4)	**Lawrence** (1)	29,616	42–42	W1
85	June 28	@ Orioles	6–4	**Littell** (7–6)	Bradish (5–8)	**Poulin** (3)	27,626	43–42	W2
86	June 29	@ Red Sox	3–6	Suárez (4–3)	**Mikolas** (2–7)	Whitlock (1)	32,000	43–43	L1
87	June 30	@ Red Sox	8–1	**Cavalli** (5–4)	Weissert (0–2)	—	33,669	44–43	W1

July: 11–13 (Home: 6–9; Road: 5–4)

#	Date	Opponent	Score	Win	Loss	Save	Attendance	Record	Streak
88	July 1	@ Red Sox	10–2	**Alvarez** (2–1)	Tolle (4–6)	—	32,574	45–43	W2
89	July 3	Pirates	9–5	**Griffin** (9–2)	Keller (6–6)	—	30,331	46–43	W3
90	July 4	Pirates	1–7	Ashcraft (9–3)	**Palmquist** (0–1)	—	28,125	46–44	L1
91	July 5	Pirates	5–11	Soto (5–2)	**Lord** (5–2)	—	19,587	46–45	L2
92	July 6	Astros	12–11	**Mikolas** (3–7)	Burrows (4–9)	**Beeter** (7)	11,092	47–45	W1
93	July 7	Astros	3–6	Okert (2–1)	**Alvarez** (2–2)	Hader (10)	20,424	47–46	L1
94	July 8	Astros	8–2	**Griffin** (10–2)	Arrighetti (7–5)	—	17,760	48–46	W1
95	July 10	Yankees	3–5	Bednar (3–3)	**Krook** (0–1)	—	38,085	48–47	L1
96	July 11	Yankees	2–4	Headrick (5–1)	**Beeter** (3–2)	Bednar (18)	34,054	48–48	L2
97	July 12	Yankees	3–5	Yarbrough (2–0)	**Alvarez** (2–3)	Blackburn (1)	33,699	48–49	L3
**All–Star Break (July 13–16)**
98	July 17	@ Athletics	23–4	**Cavalli** (6–4)	Jump (3–5)	—	11,087	49–49	W1
99	July 18	@ Athletics	1–15	Ginn (8–6)	**Littell** (7–7)	—	11,138	49–50	L1
100	July 19	@ Athletics	5–2	**Griffin** (11–2)	Lopez (4–4)	**Beeter** (8)	9,088	50–50	W1
101	July 20	@ Rockies	7–3	**Cornelio** (1–1)	Freeland (2–9)	**Cosgrove** (1)	20,050	51–50	W2
102	July 21	@ Rockies	7–8	Mejía (3–6)	**Beeter** (3–3)	Romano (7)	24,273	51–51	L1
103	July 22	@ Rockies	8–0	**Cavalli** (7–4)	Hughes (0–2)	—	23,196	52–51	W1
104	July 24	Diamondbacks	2–3	Rodríguez (9–3)	**Littell** (7–8)	Sewald (24)	36,065	52–52	L1
105	July 25	Diamondbacks	5–3	**Griffin** (12–2)	Bratt (0–1)	**Beeter** (9)	30,032	53–52	W1
106	July 26	Diamondbacks	10–7	**Cornelio** (2–1)	Loáisiga (2–3)	**Beeter** (10)	21,341	54–52	W2
107	July 27	Blue Jays	2–3	Fluharty (5–1)	**Yean** (0–1)	Varland (22)	17,618	54–53	L1
108	July 28	Blue Jays	8–6	**Cavalli** (8–4)	Bieber (2–2)	**Beeter** (11)	20,775	55–53	W1
109	July 29	Blue Jays	2–5	Yesavage (5–5)	**Ribalta** (0–2)	Varland (23)	20,044	55–54	L1
110	July 30	@ Braves	4–5	Mederos (1–0)	**Irvin** (2–5)	Iglesias (23)	35,418	55–55	L2
111	July 31	@ Braves	2–6	Elder (7–6)	**Griffin** (12–3)	Hernández (1)	37,664	55–56	L3

August: 11–18 (Home: 9–5; Road: 2–13)

#	Date	Opponent	Score	Win	Loss	Save	Attendance	Record	Streak
112	August 1	@ Braves	3–8	Pérez (7–6)	**Mikolas** (3–8)	—	38,625	55–57	L4
113	August 2	@ Braves	2–4	Dodd (3–1)	**Cavalli** (8–5)	Iglesias (24)	27,143	55–58	L5
114	August 3	@ Phillies	3–6	Backhus (2–1)	**Cosgrove** (0–1)	Durán (25)	41,115	55–59	L6
115	August 4	@ Phillies	0–5	Luzardo (10–5)	**Palmquist** (0–2)	—	38,731	55–60	L7
116	August 5	@ Phillies	10–4 (11)	**Beeter** (4–3)	Kilian (3–7)	—	37,025	56–60	W1
117	August 6	@ Phillies	3–7	Sánchez (15–4)	**Mikolas** (3–9)	—	40,301	55–61	L1
118	August 7	Reds	5–3	**Cavalli** (9–5)	Garcia (2–3)	**Beeter** (12)	26,065	57–61	W1
119	August 8	Reds	8–2	**Beeter** (5–3)	Burns (13–2)	—	32,602	58–61	W2
120	August 9	Reds	7–1	**Dion** (1–0)	Singer (5–11)	—	21,375	59–61	W3
121	August 11	Cubs	6–8	Rolison (7–1)	**Irvin** (2–6)	Webb (8)	23,428	59–62	L1
122	August 12	Cubs	7–12	Peterson (7–7)	**Cosgrove** (0–2)	Assad (2)	21,116	59–63	L2
123	August 13	Cubs	7–0	**Cavalli** (10–5)	Gausman (6–11)	—	21,463	60–63	W1
124	August 14	@ Mets	1–4	Pintaro (1–0)	**Alvarez** (2–4)	Senga (2)	30,660	60–64	L1
125	August 15	@ Mets	4–5	Yan (1–0)	**Cruz** (0–1)	—	34,737	60–65	L2
126	August 16	@ Mets	3–4	Scott (4–3)	**Irvin** (2–7)	Senga (3)	28,624	60–66	L3
127	August 18	@ Rangers	0–5	Quantrill (5–4)	**Kent** (0–1)	—	22,126	60–67	L4
128	August 19	@ Rangers	6–0	**Cavalli** (11–5)	Rocker (4–10)	—	23,963	61–67	W1
129	August 20	@ Rangers	0–2	deGrom (9–8)	**Alvarez** (2–5)	Latz (25)	21,179	61–68	L1
130	August 21	@ Marlins	2–3	Fairbanks (4–4)	**Beeter** (5–4)	—	13,941	61–69	L2
131	August 22	@ Marlins	2–4	Pérez (7–9)	**Irvin** (2–8)	Faucher (2)	18,473	61–70	L3
132	August 23	@ Marlins	2–6	Petersen (3–3)	**Kent** (0–2)	—	17,826	61–71	L4
133	August 24	Rockies	13–3	**Cavalli** (12–5)	Feltner (5–8)	—	12,105	62–71	W1
134	August 25	Rockies	1–3	Manfredi (1–0)	**Alvarez** (2–6)	Romano (13)	13,876	62–72	L1
135	August 26	Rockies	1–13	Gordon (1–4)	**Dion** (1–1)	—	13,845	62–73	L2
136	August 27	Rockies	7–1	**Cosgrove** (1–2)	Hughes (0–6)	—	14,768	63–73	W1
137	August 28	Marlins	9–2	**Kent** (1–2)	Pérez (7–10)	—	18,047	64–73	W2
138	August 29	Marlins	5–4 (10)	**Ribalta** (1–2)	Petersen (3–4)	—	32,055	65–73	W3
139	August 30	Marlins	2–6	Fulton (1–0)	**Kranick** (0–1)	—	20,891	65–74	L1
140	August 31	Marlins	6–3	**Waldron** (2–2)	Ekness (1–2)	**Tolman** (1)	10,746	66–74	W1

September: 11–11 (Home: 7–3; Road: 4–8)

#	Date	Opponent	Score	Win	Loss	Save	Attendance	Record	Streak
141	September 1	Braves	9–5	**Simpson** (1–0)	Smith-Shawver (0–1)	—	18,975	67–74	W2
142	September 2	Braves	0–9	Hernández (2–0)	**Cornelio** (2–2)	—	15,248	67–75	L1
143	September 4	@ Dodgers	3–5	Snell (3–1)	**Kent** (1–3)	Dreyer (2)	49,847	67–76	L2
144	September 5	@ Dodgers	5–6	Vesia (2–1)	**Beeter** (5–5)	Scott (21)	52,785	67–77	L3
145	September 6	@ Dodgers	5–7	Miller (1–0)	**Dion** (1–2)	Henriquez (2)	54,211	67–78	L4
146	September 7	@ Padres	2–3	Pivetta (2–2)	**Irvin** (2–9)	Miller (34)	38,149	67–79	L5
147	September 8	@ Padres	4–5	Morgan (3–1)	**Tolman** (0–1)	Morejón (3)	42,681	67–80	L6
148	September 9	@ Padres	2–9	Hart (1–3)	**Kent** (1–4)	—	33,276	67–81	L7
149	September 11	Angels	4–3	**Beeter** (6–5)	Natera Jr. (1–2)	**Tolman** (2)	17,061	68–81	W1
150	September 12	Angels	6–5 (10)	**Sinclair** (1–0)	Fermín (4–3)	—	25,713	69–81	W2
151	September 13	Angels	6–5	**Tolman** (1–1)	Murphy (0–3)	**Sinclair** (1)	20,761	70–81	W3
152	September 15	Phillies	6–3	**Lovelady** (3–4)	Sánchez (17–6)	**Tolman** (3)	23,952	71–81	W4
153	September 16	Phillies	0–3	Wheeler (13–5)	**Simpson** (1–1)	Durán (31)	23,007	71–82	L1
154	September 18	@ Cardinals	9–1	**Cavalli** (13–5)	Leahy (10–5)	—	25,855	72–82	W1
155	September 19	@ Cardinals	8–5 (11)	**Cornelio** (3–2)	Graceffo (8–2)	**Dion** (1)	29,774	73–82	W2
156	September 20	@ Cardinals	3–5	Gastélum (5–3)	**Cruz** (0–2)	O'Brien (38)	27,814	73–83	L1
157	September 21	@ Tigers	2–9	Montero (10–9)	**Herz** (0–1)	—	21,121	73–84	L2
158	September 22	@ Tigers	3–1	**Kent** (2–4)	Anderson (5–7)	**Tolman** (4)	25,608	74–84	W1
159	September 23	@ Tigers	4–2	**Dion** (2–2)	Valdez (10–12)	**Cruz** (1)	21,373	75–84	W2
160	September 25	Mets	7–6	**Varland** (2–2)	Pintaro (2–3)	**Gray** (1)	28,639	76–84	W3
161	September 26	Mets	1–7	Núñez (2–1)	**Irvin** (2–10)	—	27,284	76–85	L1
162	September 27	Mets	6–4	**Dion** (3–2)	Manaea (6–8)	**Tolman** (5)	23,753	77–85	W1

== Roster ==
2026 Washington Nationals
Roster
Pitchers: 54 Andrew Alvarez; 39 Clayton Beeter; 17 Jake Bird; 24 Cade Cavalli; 74 Riley Cornelio; 34 Tom Cosgrove; 48 Yovanny Cruz; 76 Will Dion; 19 Connelly Early; 65 Julián Fernández; 79 Andre Granillo; 40 Josiah Gray; 22 Foster Griffin; 99 Cole Henry; 77 DJ Herz; 27 Jake Irvin; 25 Jackson Kent; 57 Zak Kent; 35 Max Kranick; 58 Matt Krook; 44 Justin Lawrence; 18 Zack Littell; 41 Brad Lord; 55 Richard Lovelady; 36 Miles Mikolas; 51 Carson Palmquist; 70 Mitchell Parker; 43 Luis Perales; 51 Cionel Pérez; 50 PJ Poulin; 64 Orlando Ribalta; 79 Jackson Rutledge; 75 Paxton Schultz; 72 Jared Simpson; 49 Jack Sinclair; 73 Erik Tolman; 76 Gus Varland; 52 Ken Waldichuk; 55 Matt Waldron; 32 Trevor Williams; 46 Eddy Yean	Catchers: 17 Harry Ford; 14 Drew Millas; 20 Keibert Ruiz; Infielders: 5 CJ Abrams; 19 Andrés Chaparro; 2 Luis García Jr.; 12 Brady House; 45 Curtis Mead; 28 Yohandy Morales; 26 Nasim Nuñez; 81 Abimelec Ortiz; 8 José Tena; 84 Jorbit Vivas; Outfielders: 3 Dylan Crews; 4 Daylen Lile; 59 Andrew Pinckney; 21 Joey Wiemer; 29 James Wood; 30 Jacob Young	Manager: 10 Blake Butera; Coaches: 83 Grant Anders (development); 60 Andrew Aydt (assistant hitting); 62 Matt Borgschulte (hitting); 63 Sean Doolittle (assistant pitching); 7 Víctor Estévez (third base/infield); 9 Michael Johns (bench); 68 Dustin Glant (assistant pitching/bullpen); 53 Simon Mathews (pitching); 67 Shawn O'Malley (assistant hitting); 23 Corey Ray (first base/outfield); 1 Tyler Smarslok (field); 88 Bobby Wilson (catching/run game)

== Player stats ==
= Indicates team leader

= Indicates league leader

=== Batting ===
Note: G = Games played; AB = At bats; R = Runs scored; H = Hits; 2B = Doubles; 3B = Triples; HR = Home runs; RBI = Runs batted in; SB = Stolen bases; BB = Walks; AVG = Batting average; SLG = Slugging average

Player	G	AB	R	H	2B	3B	HR	RBI	SB	BB	AVG	SLG
Daylen Lile	160	602	81	148	28	8	22	89	15	40	.246	.429
CJ Abrams	152	579	93	151	30	4	33	106	34	57	.261	.497
James Wood	135	513	106	136	30	1	30	77	21	102	.265	.503
Nasim Nuñez	147	431	55	90	6	3	1	37	49	49	.209	.244
Jacob Young	140	421	57	106	22	3	10	50	18	33	.252	.390
Dylan Crews	109	404	55	90	20	1	13	44	12	30	.223	.374
Luis García Jr.	104	357	48	101	20	5	23	76	4	16	.283	.560
Keibert Ruiz	105	332	44	93	24	0	10	48	2	16	.280	.443
Brady House	95	320	44	79	18	0	10	46	3	29	.247	.397
Jorbit Vivas	121	311	32	74	15	1	3	31	2	41	.238	.322
Curtis Mead	87	284	49	72	17	1	17	48	6	39	.254	.500
José Tena	114	257	36	57	13	2	7	25	6	27	.222	.370
Andrés Chaparro	83	198	36	53	13	0	13	39	0	25	.268	.530
Drew Millas	50	130	18	24	4	0	2	11	0	14	.185	.262
Abimelec Ortiz	44	128	16	24	5	0	5	14	0	7	.188	.344
Harry Ford	38	100	17	19	7	0	3	10	3	17	.190	.350
Joey Wiemer	32	70	16	20	5	1	3	12	1	12	.286	.514
Yohandy Morales	17	47	10	12	4	0	4	10	1	0	.255	.596
Andrew Pinckney	17	25	7	7	0	1	1	3	1	1	.280	.480
Miles Mikolas	2	0	1	0	0	0	0	1	0	0	.---	.---
Totals	162	5509	821	1356	281	31	210	777	178	555	.246	.423

=== Pitching ===
Note: W = Wins; L = Losses; ERA = Earned run average; G = Games pitched; GS = Games started; SV = Saves; IP = Innings pitched; H = Hits allowed; R = Runs allowed; ER = Earned runs allowed; BB = Walks allowed; SO = Strikeouts

Player	W	L	ERA	G	GS	SV	IP	H	R	ER	BB	SO
Cade Cavalli	13	5	3.02	32	32	0	169.2	148	68	57	48	200
Foster Griffin	12	3	3.06	22	22	0	129.1	109	49	44	30	116
Miles Mikolas	3	9	5.82	25	11	0	116.0	137	80	75	23	58
Andrew Alvarez	2	6	3.43	25	17	1	112.2	95	43	43	51	114
Zack Littell	7	8	4.97	23	14	0	112.1	115	69	62	35	70
Jake Irvin	2	10	5.48	22	20	0	106.2	100	70	65	48	110
Brad Lord	5	2	3.78	40	5	1	83.1	69	36	35	33	77
Clayton Beeter	6	5	4.50	50	0	12	48.0	36	25	24	31	47
Orlando Ribalta	1	2	3.77	45	0	2	43.0	34	21	18	18	42
Mitchell Parker	3	3	6.58	22	0	1	39.2	46	31	29	13	34
Riley Cornelio	3	2	3.68	18	3	0	36.2	26	22	15	29	40
PJ Poulin	3	0	2.70	35	11	3	36.2	27	12	11	21	25
Jackson Kent	2	4	5.94	8	7	0	36.1	40	25	24	25	30
Gus Varland	2	2	6.55	34	0	6	33.0	43	26	24	15	32
Paxton Schultz	1	2	6.40	27	1	1	32.1	43	26	23	12	32
Will Dion	3	2	3.00	15	1	1	30.0	18	10	10	14	30
Richard Lovelady	2	3	4.23	32	6	4	27.2	33	15	13	20	25
Max Kranick	0	1	9.33	17	0	0	18.1	27	19	19	13	11
Trevor Williams	0	0	2.65	8	0	0	17.0	15	5	5	6	22
Carson Palmquist	0	2	7.71	11	6	0	16.1	21	14	14	8	15
Tom Cosgrove	1	2	7.71	18	0	1	16.1	18	16	14	6	14
Cionel Pérez	2	3	6.19	16	0	0	16.0	16	12	11	11	9
Erik Tolman	1	1	2.93	15	0	5	15.1	13	6	5	9	17
Cole Henry	0	2	7.90	11	0	0	13.2	17	14	12	7	15
Zak Kent	0	0	5.68	9	0	0	12.2	15	8	8	3	10
Jack Sinclair	1	0	2.45	11	0	1	11.0	6	3	3	4	8
Luis Perales	0	0	11.45	6	0	0	11.0	15	14	14	13	13
Eddy Yean	0	1	2.45	8	1	0	11.0	8	3	3	2	7
Yovanny Cruz	0	2	6.75	13	0	1	10.2	13	8	8	8	9
Ken Waldichuk	0	0	6.75	5	0	0	9.1	8	7	7	6	8
Andre Granillo	0	0	9.64	8	0	0	9.1	13	12	10	8	3
Jake Bird	0	0	3.24	8	0	0	8.1	6	3	3	2	10
DJ Herz	0	1	10.29	2	2	0	7.0	11	8	8	3	6
Justin Lawrence	0	0	4.26	7	0	1	6.1	7	3	3	7	6
Matt Waldron	1	0	0.00	3	1	0	5.2	7	0	0	1	2
Matt Krook	0	1	7.71	6	0	0	4.2	4	4	4	6	4
Jared Simpson	1	1	10.38	4	1	0	4.1	1	5	5	7	4
Julián Fernández	0	0	2.25	3	0	0	4.0	3	3	1	2	3
Jorbit Vivas	0	0	13.50	4	0	0	4.0	11	7	6	1	0
Josiah Gray	0	0	0.00	3	0	1	4.0	3	0	0	1	2
Connelly Early	0	0	0.00	1	1	0	3.0	1	0	0	0	1
Joey Wiemer	0	0	22.50	2	0	0	2.0	7	5	5	2	0
Jackson Rutledge	0	0	47.25	1	0	0	1.1	6	7	7	2	2
José Tena	0	0	9.00	1	0	0	1.0	2	1	1	1	0
Totals	77	85	4.67	162	162	42	1437.0	1393	815	745	605	1283

== Farm system ==
Level	Team	League	Manager
Triple-A	Rochester Red Wings	International League	Matthew LeCroy
Double-A	Harrisburg Senators	Eastern League	Delino DeShields
High-A	Wilmington Blue Rocks	South Atlantic League	Ted Tom
Single-A	Fredericksburg Nationals	Carolina League	Chris O'Neill
Rookie	FCL Nationals	Florida Complex League	Carmelo Jaime
Rookie	DSL Nationals	Dominican Summer League	Sandy Martínez
