= List of Major League Baseball team rosters =

Below are the full rosters, including the coaching staffs, of all 30 Major League Baseball teams. All teams are allowed up to 40 players on their roster, which does not include players on the 60-day injured list.

== American League ==
=== American League East Roster ===
Baltimore Orioles roster
Active roster	Inactive roster	Coaches / other
Pitchers; Starting rotation: 40 Chris Bassitt; 34 Shane Baz; 38 Kyle Bradish; 28 Trevor Rogers; 63 Brandon Young; Bullpen: 45 Keegan Akin; 78 Yennier Canó; 50 Rico Garcia; 39 Andrew Kittredge; 66 Anthony Nunez; 49 Albert Suárez; 68 Tyler Wells; 48 Grant Wolfram; Catchers: 29 Samuel Basallo; -- Sam Huff; 35 Adley Rutschman; Infielders: 23 Blaze Alexander; 25 Pete Alonso; 2 Gunnar Henderson; 7 Jackson Holliday; 82 Jeremiah Jackson; 16 Coby Mayo; Outfielders: 17 Colton Cowser; 9 Tyler O'Neill; 30 Leody Taveras; 3 Taylor Ward	Pitchers: 65 Cameron Foster; 43 Trey Gibson; 21 Ryan Helsley; -- Kyle Nicolas; 37 Cade Povich; 72 Nick Raquet; 61 Josh Walker; 80 Cameron Weston; Infielders: -- Christian Encarnacion-Strand; Outfielders: 12 Dylan Beavers; 13 Heston Kjerstad; 62 Johnathan Rodríguez; -- Michael Siani; 62 Reed Trimble	Manager: 55 Craig Albernaz; Coaches: 36 Jason Bourgeois (first base); 46 Buck Britton (third base); 47 Miguel Cairo (infield); 51 Hank Conger (bullpen); 53 Donnie Ecker (bench); 75 Drew French (pitching); 89 Ryan Klimek (pitching strategy); 86 Dustin Lind (hitting); 85 Brady North (assistant hitting); 77 Mitch Plassmeyer (assistant pitching); 87 Joe Singley (field coordinator/catching); 60-day injured list: 74 Félix Bautista; 24 Zach Eflin; 76 Yaramil Hiraldo; 64 Dean Kremer; 6 Ryan Mountcastle; 60 Colin Selby; 11 Jordan Westburg; 26 active, 14 inactive; 7-, 10-, or 15-day injured list; ^{#} Personal leave; Roster and coaches updated June 6, 2026; Transactions • Depth chart; → All MLB rosters

Boston Red Sox roster
Active roster	Inactive roster	Coaches / other
Pitchers; Starting rotation: 71 Connelly Early; 54 Sonny Gray; 55 Ranger Suárez; 70 Payton Tolle; Bullpen: 67 Danny Coulombe; 68 Alec Gamboa; 41 Tyron Guerrero; 46 Tommy Kahnle; 60 Joe La Sorsa; 63 Justin Slaten; 56 Ryan Watson; 57 Greg Weissert; Closer(s): 44 Aroldis Chapman; Catchers: 75 Carlos Narváez; 12 Connor Wong; Infielders: 40 Willson Contreras; 5 Caleb Durbin; 30 Mickey Gasper; 2 Isiah Kiner-Falefa; 11 Marcelo Mayer; 32 Andruw Monasterio; 48 Anthony Seigler; Outfielders: 52 Wilyer Abreu; 16 Jarren Duran; 3 Ceddanne Rafaela; 7 Masataka Yoshida	Pitchers: 77 Jack Anderson; 66 Brayan Bello; 64 Jake Bennett; 76 Zack Kelly; 47 Jovani Morán; 99 Eduardo Rivera; 78 Tyler Samaniego; 79 Tyler Uberstine; 22 Garrett Whitlock; Infielders: 28 Kristian Campbell; 39 Tsung-Che Cheng; 20 Nick Sogard; Outfielders: 19 Roman Anthony; 18 Nate Eaton	Manager: 17 Chad Tracy (interim); Coaches: 53 Andrew Bailey (pitching); 83 Pablo Cabrera (first base/outfield, interim); 81 Chad Epperson (third base, interim); 58 José David Flores (bench, interim); 86 Parker Guinn (bullpen catcher/catching instructor); 84 Collin Hetzler (interim hitting); 59 Chris Holt (bullpen); 88 Nelson Paulino (hitting, interim); 82 Devin Rose (pitching strategist); 92 Jack Simonetty (interim hitting assistant); 85 John Soteropulos (hitting); 60-day injured list: 36 Triston Casas; 50 Kutter Crawford; 35 Garrett Crochet; 23 Romy González; 89 Tanner Houck; 29 Johan Oviedo; 43 Patrick Sandoval; 10 Trevor Story; 26 active, 14 inactive; 7-, 10-, or 15-day injured list; ^{#} Personal leave; Roster and coaches updated June 6, 2026; Transactions • Depth chart; → All MLB rosters

New York Yankees roster
Active roster	Inactive roster	Coaches / other
Pitchers; Starting rotation: 45 Gerrit Cole; 55 Carlos Rodón; 31 Cam Schlittler; 29 Will Warren; 40 Ryan Weathers; Bullpen: 59 Jake Bird; 58 Paul Blackburn; 63 Fernando Cruz; 75 Camilo Doval; 47 Brent Headrick; 41 Tim Hill; 33 Ryan Yarbrough; Closer(s): 53 David Bednar; Catchers: 25 J. C. Escarra; 39 Ali Sánchez; Infielders: 72 José Caballero; 13 Jazz Chisholm Jr.; 48 Paul Goldschmidt; 19 Ryan McMahon; 22 Ben Rice; 14 Amed Rosario; 30 Max Schuemann; 11 Anthony Volpe; Outfielders: 35 Cody Bellinger; 12 Trent Grisham; 78 Spencer Jones	Pitchers: 89 Brendan Beck; 74 Kervin Castro; 57 Angel Chivilli; 96 Yovanny Cruz; 73 Yerry De Los Santos; 54 Max Fried; 81 Luis Gil; 86 Chase Hampton; 71 Elmer Rodríguez; Catchers: 28 Austin Wells; Infielders: 95 Oswaldo Cabrera; Outfielders: 24 Jasson Domínguez; 99 Aaron Judge; Designated hitters: 27 Giancarlo Stanton	Manager: 17 Aaron Boone; Coaches: 65 Brad Ausmus (bench); 77 Matt Blake (pitching); -- Rainiero Coa (bullpen catcher); 85 Dan Fiorito (first base/infield); 79 Preston Claiborne (bullpen/assistant pitching); 83 Desi Druschel (assistant pitching); 78 Casey Dykes (assistant hitting); 84 Jake Hirst (assistant hitting); 67 Luis Rojas (third base/outfield); 82 James Rowson (hitting); -- Peter Serruto (bullpen catcher); 76 Tanner Swanson (field coordinator/catching); 60-day injured list: 36 Clarke Schmidt; 26 active, 13 inactive; 7-, 10-, or 15-day injured list; ^{#} Personal leave; Roster and coaches updated June 5, 2026; Transactions • Depth chart; → All MLB rosters

Tampa Bay Rays roster
Active roster	Inactive roster	Coaches / other
Pitchers; Starting rotation: 22 Griffin Jax; 28 Nick Martinez; 32 Steven Matz; 18 Shane McClanahan; 57 Drew Rasmussen; Bullpen: 47 Bryan Baker; 62 Cam Booser; 60 Garrett Cleavinger; 59 Mason Englert; 49 Kevin Kelly; 67 Casey Legumina; 61 Ian Seymour; 71 Cole Sulser; Catchers: 30 Hunter Feduccia; 40 Nick Fortes; Infielders: 8 Jonathan Aranda; 13 Junior Caminero; 2 Yandy Díaz; 35 Oliver Dunn; 6 Taylor Walls; 15 Ben Williamson; Outfielders: 25 Víctor Mesa Jr.; 31 Cedric Mullins; 1 Richie Palacios; 14 Chandler Simpson; 26 Ryan Vilade	Pitchers: 43 Hunter Bigge; 36 Joe Boyle; 54 Alex Cook; 68 Jonathan Heasley; 46 Craig Kimbrel; 70 Trevor Martin; 65 Jesse Scholtens; 72 Chase Solesky; Catchers: 48 Dominic Keegan; Infielders: 45 Jadher Areinamo; 7 Carson Williams; Outfielders: 21 Jonny DeLuca; 17 Jake Fraley; 29 Jacob Melton	Manager: 16 Kevin Cash; Coaches: 10 Corey Dickerson (first base); 99 Misha Dworken (bullpen catcher); 41 Tomas Francisco (field coordinator); -- Kris Goodman (process and development); 52 Rick Knapp (assistant pitching); 27 Rodney Linares (bench); 33 Jorge Moncada (bullpen); 51 Chad Mottola (hitting); 23 Kyle Snyder (pitching); 30 Ozzie Timmons (assistant hitting); 96 Charlie Valerio (bullpen catcher); 4 Brady Williams (third base); 60-day injured list: -- Michael Grove; 11 Gavin Lux; 44 Ryan Pepiot; 39 Manuel Rodríguez; 63 Edwin Uceta; 24 Steven Wilson; Restricted list: 5 Wander Franco; 26 active, 14 inactive; 7-, 10-, or 15-day injured list; ^{#} Personal leave; Roster and coaches updated June 3, 2026; Transactions • Depth chart; → All MLB rosters

Toronto Blue Jays roster
Active roster	Inactive roster	Coaches / other
Pitchers; Starting rotation: 46 Patrick Corbin; 34 Kevin Gausman; 10 Simeon Woods Richardson; 39 Trey Yesavage; Bullpen: 63 Braydon Fisher; 68 Mason Fluharty; 23 Jeff Hoffman; 64 Adam Macko; 62 Spencer Miles; 29 Yariel Rodríguez; 71 Tyler Rogers; 40 Connor Seabold; Closer(s): 77 Louis Varland; Catchers: 55 Tyler Heineman; 59 Brandon Valenzuela; Infielders: 22 Ernie Clement; 0 Andrés Giménez; 27 Vladimir Guerrero Jr.; 26 Charles McAdoo; 7 Kazuma Okamoto; Outfielders: 38 Nathan Lukes; 24 Yohendrick Piñango; 12 Jesús Sánchez; 4 George Springer; 3 Myles Straw; 5 Daulton Varsho	Pitchers: 28 Jake Bloss; 84 Dylan Cease; 37 Chad Dallas; 70 Hayden Juenger; 52 Chase Lee; 54 Brendon Little; 45 Tommy Nance; 31 Max Scherzer; 33 Ricky Tiedemann; Catchers: -- Willie MacIver; Infielders: 50 Lenyn Sosa; Outfielders: 47 Addison Barger; 8 Jonatan Clase; 36 Davis Schneider	Manager: 14 John Schneider; Coaches: 61 Alex Andreopoulos (bullpen catcher); 81 Cody Atkinson (assistant hitting); 53 Mark Budzinski (first base/outfield); 51 Carlos Febles (third base/infield); 88 Sam Greene (assistant pitching); 15 DeMarlo Hale (associate manager); 78 Luis Hurtado (bullpen catcher); 80 Lou Iannotti (assistant hitting); 82 Graham Johnson (bullpen); -- John Lannan (mental performance coach); 79 David Popkins (hitting); 41 Pete Walker (pitching); Vacant (bench); 60-day injured list: 17 José Berríos; 57 Shane Bieber; 60 Lázaro Estrada; 44 Bowden Francis; 93 Yimi García; 30 Alejandro Kirk; 35 Joe Mantiply; 66 Cody Ponce; 25 Anthony Santander; 26 active, 14 inactive; 7-, 10-, or 15-day injured list; ^{#} Personal leave; Roster and coaches updated June 5, 2026; Transactions • Depth chart; → All MLB rosters

=== American League Central ===
Chicago White Sox roster
Active roster	Inactive roster	Coaches / other
Pitchers; Starting rotation: 59 Sean Burke; 47 Erick Fedde; 18 Anthony Kay; 65 Davis Martin; 54 David Sandlin; Bullpen: 63 Tyler Davis; 53 Brandon Eisert; 40 Tyler Gilbert; 60 Bryan Hudson; 15 Sean Newcomb; 43 Trevor Richards; 31 Grant Taylor; Closer(s): 58 Seranthony Domínguez; Catchers: 26 Edgar Quero; 36 Drew Romo; Infielders: 0 Luisangel Acuña; 17 Sam Antonacci; 7 Jacob Gonzalez; 10 Chase Meidroth; 12 Colson Montgomery; 51 Rikuu Nishida; 20 Miguel Vargas; Outfielders: 23 Andrew Benintendi; 34 Randal Grichuk; 25 Derek Hill; 29 Tristan Peters	Pitchers: 48 Jonathan Cannon; 67 Duncan Davitt; 66 Wikelman González; 44 Jordan Hicks; 68 Tanner McDougal; 38 Chris Murphy; -- Joe Rock; 22 Noah Schultz; 62 Tyler Schweitzer; 64 Shane Smith; Infielders: 5 Munetaka Murakami; Outfielders: 21 Austin Hays; 28 Everson Pereira; -- Junior Pérez	Manager: 1 Will Venable; Coaches: 84 Zach Bove (pitching); 81 Chris Denorfia (field coordinator); 85 Bobby Hearn (assistant pitching); 71 Justin Jirschele (third base/infield); 73 Jose Leger (first base/outfield); 94 Bennett Markinson (bullpen catcher); 77 Joel McKeithan (assistant hitting); 99 Walker McKinven (bench); 95 Tony Medina (major league assistant); 76 Derek Shomon (hitting); 96 Luis Sierra (bullpen catcher); 83 Matt Wise (bullpen); 60-day injured list: 27 Brooks Baldwin; 52 Prelander Berroa; 57 Ky Bush; 49 Jordan Leasure; 41 Tanner Murray; 8 Kyle Teel; 33 Drew Thorpe; 61 Mike Vasil; 26 active, 14 inactive; 7-, 10-, or 15-day injured list; ^{#} Personal leave; Roster and coaches updated June 4, 2026; Transactions • Depth chart; → All MLB rosters

Cleveland Guardians roster
Active roster	Inactive roster	Coaches / other
Pitchers; Starting rotation: 28 Tanner Bibee; 54 Joey Cantillo; 44 Slade Cecconi; 77 Parker Messick; 32 Gavin Williams; Bullpen: 43 Shawn Armstrong; 98 Will Dion; 52 Matt Festa; 33 Hunter Gaddis; 29 Tim Herrin; 50 Codi Heuer; 35 Colin Holderman; Closer(s): 36 Cade Smith; Catchers: 16 Patrick Bailey; 27 Austin Hedges; Infielders: 37 Travis Bazzana; 8 Rhys Hoskins; 9 Kyle Manzardo; 11 José Ramírez; 4 Brayan Rocchio; Outfielders: 24 Chase DeLauter; 17 Stuart Fairchild; 6 David Fry; 38 Steven Kwan; 1 Ángel Martínez; 10 Daniel Schneemann	Pitchers: 55 Franco Alemán; 26 Logan Allen; 66 Daniel Espino; 95 Yorman Gómez; 80 Austin Peterson; 62 Erik Sabrowski; 91 Andrew Walters; Catchers: 23 Bo Naylor; Infielders: 34 Juan Brito; 73 Ángel Genao; Outfielders: 0 Petey Halpin; 2 CJ Kayfus; 7 George Valera; 71 Kahlil Watson	Manager: 12 Stephen Vogt; Coaches: 15 Sandy Alomar Jr. (first base/catching); 57 Tony Arnerich (bench coach); 85 Junior Betances (assistant hitting); 56 Grant Fink (hitting); 81 Brad Goldberg (assistant pitching); 88 Caleb Longshore (bullpen); 84 J. T. Maguire (outfield/base running); 87 Andy McKay (field coordinator); 53 Rouglas Odor (third base/infield); 82 Ricky Pacione (bullpen catcher); 83 Dan Puente (assistant hitting); 89 Agustin Rivero (coach/interpreter); 72 Eric Rodríguez (bullpen catcher); 86 Joe Torres (assistant pitching); -- Josh Tubbs (hitting analyst); 51 Carl Willis (pitching); 60-day injured list: 13 Gabriel Arias; Restricted list: 48 Emmanuel Clase; 45 Luis Ortiz; 26 active, 14 inactive; 7-, 10-, or 15-day injured list; ^{#} Personal leave; Roster and coaches updated June 2, 2026; Transactions • Depth chart; → All MLB rosters

Detroit Tigers roster
Active roster	Inactive roster	Coaches / other
Pitchers; Starting rotation: 9 Jack Flaherty; 36 Ty Madden; 52 Troy Melton; 54 Keider Montero; 59 Framber Valdez; Bullpen: 38 Drew Anderson; 4 Beau Brieske; 37 Enmanuel De Jesus; 67 Kyle Finnegan; 75 Brenan Hanifee; 87 Tyler Holton; 51 Drew Sommers; 19 Will Vest; Catchers: 13 Dillon Dingler; 34 Jake Rogers; Infielders: 33 Colt Keith; 7 Kevin McGonigle; 39 Zach McKinstry; 15 Zack Short; 20 Spencer Torkelson; 25 Gleyber Torres; Outfielders: 30 Kerry Carpenter; 31 Riley Greene; 18 Jahmai Jones; 46 Wenceel Pérez; 8 Matt Vierling	Pitchers: 74 Kenley Jansen; 66 Sawyer Gipson-Long; 60 Jake Miller; 12 Casey Mize; 29 Tarik Skubal; 65 Burch Smith; 70 Ricky Vanasco; Catchers: 49 Thayron Liranzo; 32 Eduardo Valencia; Infielders: 17 Jace Jung; 50 Hao-Yu Lee; 99 Gage Workman; Outfielders: 28 Javier Báez; 40 Trei Cruz	Manager: 14 A. J. Hinch; Coaches: 92 Cody Asche (assistant hitting); 88 Billy Boyer (quality control); 90 Michael Brdar (hitting); 98 Chris Chinea (bullpen catcher); 56 Joey Cora (third base); 41 Chris Fetter (pitching); 26 George Lombard (bench); 63 Robin Lund (assistant pitching); 61 Juan Nieves (assistant pitching); 97 Tim Remes (bullpen catcher); 77 Anthony Sanders (first base); 83 Ryan Sienko (catching); 91 Lance Zawadzki (assistant hitting); 60-day injured list: 57 Bailey Horn; 48 Brant Hurter; 21 Jackson Jobe; 22 Parker Meadows; 45 Reese Olson; 27 Trey Sweeney; 35 Justin Verlander; 26 active, 14 inactive; 7-, 10-, or 15-day injured list; ^{#} Personal leave; Roster and coaches updated June 2, 2026; Transactions • Depth chart; → All MLB rosters

Kansas City Royals roster
Active roster	Inactive roster	Coaches / other
Pitchers; Starting rotation: 65 Noah Cameron; 67 Seth Lugo; 52 Michael Wacha; Bullpen: 58 Luinder Avila; 47 Mason Black; 64 Steven Cruz; 49 Alex Lange; 41 Daniel Lynch IV; 46 John Schreiber; 25 Matt Strahm; 44 Beck Way; Closer(s): 60 Lucas Erceg; Catchers: 22 Carter Jensen; 13 Salvador Perez; Infielders: 11 Maikel García; 19 Michael Massey; 9 Vinnie Pasquantino; 40 Josh Rojas; 2 Tyler Tolbert; 7 Bobby Witt Jr.; Outfielders: 14 Jac Caglianone; 1 Isaac Collins; 28 Kyle Isbel; 12 Nick Loftin; 0 Starling Marte; 15 Lane Thomas	Pitchers: 38 Ryan Bergert; 50 Kris Bubic; 87 Eric Cerantola; 53 Carlos Estévez; 32 Stephen Kolek ^{#}; 59 Ben Kudrna; 31 Nick Mears; 34 Eli Morgan; 55 Cole Ragans; 54 Mitch Spence; 63 Steven Zobac; Outfielders: -- Matthew Lugo; 26 Kameron Misner; 16 John Rave	Manager: 33 Matt Quatraro; Coaches: 68 José Alguacil (infield); 70 Connor Dawson (assistant hitting); 80 Allan de San Miguel (bullpen catcher); 82 Miguel Garcia (coach); 83 Juan Graterol (bullpen catcher); 39 Damon Hollins (first base); 49 Paul Hoover (bench); 84 Mike McFerran (assistant pitching); 57 Mitch Stetter (bullpen); 85 Brian Sweeney (pitching); 99 Marcus Thames (assistant hitting); 25 Vance Wilson (third base); 37 Alec Zumwalt (hitting); 60-day injured list: 6 Jonathan India; 48 Alec Marsh; 66 James McArthur; 26 active, 14 inactive; 7-, 10-, or 15-day injured list; ^{#} Personal leave; Roster and coaches updated June 4, 2026; Transactions • Depth chart; → All MLB rosters

Minnesota Twins roster
Active roster	Inactive roster	Coaches / other
Pitchers; Starting rotation: 26 Taj Bradley; 52 Zebby Matthews; 53 Mike Paredes; 61 Connor Prielipp; 41 Joe Ryan; Bullpen: 45 Travis Adams; 43 Anthony Banda; 94 Yoendrys Gómez; 65 Cody Laweryson; 31 Justin Lawrence; 78 Andrew Morris; 19 Eric Orze; 55 Taylor Rogers; Catchers: 37 Víctor Caratini; 70 Alex Jackson; Infielders: 11 Orlando Arcia; 56 Josh Bell; 2 Kody Clemens; 4 Tristan Gray; 15 Luke Keaschall; 31 Ryan Kreidler; 22 Brooks Lee; 23 Royce Lewis; Outfielders: 25 Byron Buxton; 9 Trevor Larnach; 16 Austin Martin	Pitchers: 20 Mick Abel; 55 Kody Funderburk; 71 John Klein; 17 Bailey Ober; 85 Marco Raya; 60 Kendry Rojas; 44 Cole Sands; Catchers: 27 Ryan Jeffers; Outfielders: 72 Gabriel González; 64 Hendry Méndez; 18 Alan Roden; 33 Emmanuel Rodríguez; 38 Matt Wallner	Manager: 8 Derek Shelton; Coaches: 67 Trevor Amicone (assistant hitting); 84 Keith Beauregard (hitting); 46 Ramon Borrego (third base); 75 Nate Dammann (quality control); 98 Anderson De La Rosa (bullpen catcher); 66 Toby Gardenhire (major league field coordinator); 68 Mark Hallberg (bench); 32 LaTroy Hawkins (bullpen); 88 Pete Maki (pitching); 98 Frank Nigro (bullpen catcher); 63 Mike Rabelo (assistant bench); 91 Luis Ramirez (assistant pitching); 79 Rayden Sierra (assistant hitting); 0 Grady Sizemore (first base); 60-day injured list: 50 Garrett Acton; 58 David Festa; 49 Pablo López; 26 active, 13 inactive; 7-, 10-, or 15-day injured list; ^{#} Personal leave; Roster and coaches updated June 6, 2026; Transactions • Depth chart; → All MLB rosters

=== American League West ===
Houston Astros roster
Active roster	Inactive roster	Coaches / other
Pitchers; Starting rotation: 41 Spencer Arrighetti; 50 Mike Burrows; 45 Tatsuya Imai; 38 Peter Lambert; 17 Kai-Wei Teng; Bullpen: 52 Bryan Abreu; 69 AJ Blubaugh; 65 Enyel De Los Santos; 74 Bryan King; 48 Steven Okert; 55 Nate Pearson; 72 Alimber Santa; Closer(s): 71 Josh Hader; Catchers: 37 Collin Price; 2 Christian Vázquez; Infielders: 20 Nick Allen; 27 Jose Altuve; 0 Brice Matthews; 15 Isaac Paredes; 3 Jeremy Peña; 8 Christian Walker; Outfielders: 44 Yordan Alvarez; 6 Jake Meyers; 11 Cam Smith; 26 Taylor Trammell; 31 LaMonte Wade Jr.	Pitchers: 54 Jason Alexander; 61 Colton Gordon; 43 Lance McCullers; 70 Jayden Murray; 62 Bennett Sousa; 66 Miguel Ullola; 64 Logan VanWey; 51 Ryan Weiss; Catchers: 21 Yainer Díaz; Infielders: 28 Braden Shewmake; Outfielders: 16 Zach Cole; 9 Zach Dezenzo; 10 Joey Loperfido; 14 Shay Whitcomb	Manager: 19 Joe Espada; Coaches: 97 Jason Bell (coach); 85 Javier Bracamonte (bullpen catcher); 23 Dave Clark (first base); 82 Tim Cossins (catching); 91 Dan Hennigan (hitting); 76 Anthony Iapoce (hitting); 99 Tommy Kawamura (strategy); 88 Ethan Katz (pitching); 22 Omar López (bench); 36 Josh Miller (pitching); 12 Tony Perezchica (third base); 47 Victor Rodriguez (hitting); 60-day injured list: 56 Ronel Blanco; 58 Hunter Brown; 1 Carlos Correa; 53 Cristian Javier; 60 Brandon Walter; 39 Hayden Wesneski; 26 active, 14 inactive; 7-, 10-, or 15-day injured list; ^{#} Personal leave; Roster and coaches updated June 5, 2026; Transactions • Depth chart; → All MLB rosters

Los Angeles Angels roster
Active roster	Inactive roster	Coaches / other
Pitchers; Starting rotation: 48 Reid Detmers; 21 Grayson Rodriguez; 59 José Soriano; 57 Walbert Ureña; Bullpen: 61 Sam Aldegheri; 40 Sam Bachman; 70 Mitch Farris; 52 Samy Natera Jr.; 13 Drew Pomeranz; 63 Chase Silseth; 37 Brent Suter; 39 Kirby Yates; 56 Ryan Zeferjahn; Catchers: 14 Logan O'Hoppe; 38 Sebastián Rivero; Infielders: 20 Adam Frazier; 5 Vaughn Grissom; 17 Nick Madrigal; 9 Zach Neto; 2 Oswald Peraza; 18 Nolan Schanuel; 35 Donovan Walton; Outfielders: 7 Jo Adell; 53 Wade Meckler; 28 Jose Siri; 27 Mike Trout	Pitchers: 36 Caden Dana; 68 José Fermín; 32 Ryan Johnson; 58 George Klassen; 41 Jack Kochanowicz; 55 Tayler Saucedo; Catchers: -- Gustavo Campero; Infielders: 13 Denzer Guzmán; 10 Yoán Moncada; 4 Christian Moore; 19 Kyren Paris; Outfielders: 3 Josh Lowe; 12 Jorge Soler; 22 Bryce Teodosio	Manager: 8 Kurt Suzuki; Coaches: 99 Brady Anderson (hitting); 91 Mike Ashman (batting practice pitcher); 93 Jason Brown (bullpen catcher); 95 Tim Buss (staff assistant); 84 Dom Chiti (bullpen); 92 Adam Eaton (first base and outfield); 82 Derek Florko (assistant hitting); 85 John Gibbons (bench); 89 Keith Johnson (third base); 87 John Mabry (assistant hitting); 88 Mike Maddux (pitching); 86 Andy Schatzley (infield); 80 Darryl Scott (assistant pitching); 83 Max Stassi (catching); 60-day injured list: 25 Travis d'Arnaud; 44 Ben Joyce; 16 Yusei Kikuchi; 6 Anthony Rendon; 24 Robert Stephenson; 26 active, 14 inactive; 7-, 10-, or 15-day injured list; ^{#} Personal leave; Roster and coaches updated June 7, 2026; Transactions • Depth chart; → All MLB rosters

Athletics roster
Active roster	Inactive roster	Coaches / other
Pitchers; Starting rotation: 59 Jeffrey Springs; Bullpen: 80 Elvis Alvarado; 58 Scott Barlow; 63 Mason Barnett; 35 J. T. Ginn; 36 Hogan Harris; 61 Gage Jump; 38 Mark Leiter Jr.; 46 Luis Medina; 67 Kade Morris; 50 Jack Perkins; 60 Justin Sterner; 54 José Suárez; Catchers: 15 Jonah Heim; 23 Shea Langeliers; Infielders: 20 Zack Gelof; 2 Darell Hernáiz; 16 Nick Kurtz; 22 Jeff McNeil; 12 Alika Williams; Outfielders: 33 Henry Bolte; 4 Lawrence Butler; 26 Carlos Cortes; 21 Tyler Soderstrom; 32 Colby Thomas; Designated hitters: 25 Brent Rooker	Pitchers: 76 Henry Báez; 66 Brady Basso; 45 Aaron Civale; 68 Joey Estes; 49 Michael Kelly; 57 Jacob Lopez; 19 Luis Morales; 78 Braden Nett; 40 Luis Severino; 73 Chen Zhong-Ao Zhuang; Infielders: 11 Brett Harris; 3 Max Muncy; 5 Jacob Wilson	Manager: 7 Mark Kotsay; Coaches: 18 Mike Aldrete (hitting); 51 Darren Bush (bench); 29 Ryan Christenson (first base); 41 Chris Cron (assistant hitting); 8 Bobby Crosby (third base); 14 Scott Emerson (pitching); 88 Ramón Hernández (coach and interpreter); 71 Dan Hubbs (bullpen); 91 Dustin Hughes (bullpen catcher); 72 Marcus Jensen (quality control); 90 Christian Molfetta (bullpen catcher); 60-day injured list: 1 Denzel Clarke; 53 Gunnar Hoglund; 48 Brooks Kriske; 26 active, 13 inactive; 7-, 10-, or 15-day injured list; ^{#} Personal leave; Roster and coaches updated June 5, 2026; Transactions • Depth chart; → All MLB rosters

Seattle Mariners roster
Active roster	Inactive roster	Coaches / other
Pitchers; Starting rotation: 58 Luis Castillo; 36 Logan Gilbert; 26 Emerson Hancock; 68 George Kirby; 50 Bryce Miller; 22 Bryan Woo; Bullpen: 83 Eduard Bazardo; 47 Matt Brash; 88 Cooper Criswell; 45 José A. Ferrer; 48 Alex Hoppe; 55 Gabe Speier; Closer(s): 75 Andrés Muñoz; Catchers: 77 Mitch Garver; 5 Jhonny Pereda; Infielders: 3 J. P. Crawford; 4 Colt Emerson; 12 Josh Naylor; 35 Patrick Wisdom; 2 Cole Young; Outfielders: 56 Randy Arozarena; 8 Dominic Canzone; 20 Luke Raley; 30 Rob Refsnyder; 10 Víctor Robles; 44 Julio Rodríguez	Pitchers: 82 Nick Davila; 46 Domingo Gonzalez; 49 Robinson Ortiz; 37 Josh Simpson; 59 Troy Taylor; 43 Cole Wilcox; 61 Yosver Zulueta; Catchers: 29 Cal Raleigh; Infielders: 1 Ryan Bliss; 33 Brendan Donovan; 76 Leo Rivas; 7 Will Wilson; Outfielders: -- Brennen Davis; 9 Connor Joe	Manager: 6 Dan Wilson; Coaches: 14 Manny Acta (bench); 66 Fleming Baez (bullpen catcher); 40 Trent Blank (director of pitching strategy); 57 Carlos Cardoza (third base); 80 Danny Farquhar (assistant pitching); 16 Perry Hill (infield); 70 Bobby Magallanes (assistant hitting); 11 Edgar Martínez (director of hitting strategy); 84 Jake McKinley (field coordinator); 60 Austin Nola (bullpen); 95 Justin Novak (bullpen catcher); 33 Kevin Seitzer (hitting); 32 Pete Woodworth (pitching); 53 Eric Young Jr. (first base); 60-day injured list: 23 Logan Evans; 21 Miles Mastrobuoni; 54 Carlos Vargas; 26 active, 14 inactive; 7-, 10-, or 15-day injured list; ^{#} Personal leave; Roster and coaches updated May 26, 2026; Transactions • Depth chart; → All MLB rosters

Texas Rangers roster
Active roster	Inactive roster	Coaches / other
Pitchers; Starting rotation: 48 Jacob deGrom; 17 Nathan Eovaldi; 1 MacKenzie Gore; 22 Jack Leiter; 80 Kumar Rocker; Bullpen: 54 Robby Ahlstrom; 13 Tyler Alexander; 68 Jalen Beeks; 57 Luis Curvelo; 75 Peyton Gray; 16 Jakob Junis; 67 Jacob Latz; 44 Cal Quantrill; Catchers: 35 Elías Díaz; 11 Kyle Higashioka; Infielders: 21 Jake Burger; 20 Ezequiel Durán; 14 Justin Foscue; 6 Josh Jung; 33 Nicky Lopez; 5 Corey Seager; Outfielders: 32 Evan Carter; 23 Michael Helman; 36 Wyatt Langford; 24 Brandon Nimmo; Designated hitters: 3 Joc Pederson	Pitchers: 65 Gavin Collyer; 59 José Corniell; 72 David Davalillo; 74 Leandro López; 31 Chris Martin; 63 Michel Otañez; 84 Winston Santos; 82 Emiliano Teodo; 60 Cole Winn; Catchers: 9 Danny Jansen; Infielders: -- Blaine Crim; 39 Cody Freeman; 8 Josh Smith; Outfielders: 19 Alejandro Osuna	Manager: 55 Skip Schumaker; Coaches: 88 Rod Barajas (quality control); 85 Dave Bush (assistant pitching); 73 Alex Cintrón (hitting); 82 Eric Dorton (assistant hitting); 87 Brett Hayes (catching); 96 Travis Jankowski (first base); 64 Corey Ragsdale (third base); 84 Colby Suggs (bullpen); 83 Jordan Tiegs (pitching); 81 Luis Urueta (bench); 89 Justin Viele (lead hitting); 60-day injured list: 45 Carter Baumler; 61 Cody Bradford; 62 Robert Garcia; 52 Jordan Montgomery; 26 active, 14 inactive; 7-, 10-, or 15-day injured list; ^{#} Personal leave; Roster and coaches updated June 6, 2026; Transactions • Depth chart; → All MLB rosters

== National League ==
=== National League East ===
Atlanta Braves roster
Active roster	Inactive roster	Coaches / other
Pitchers; Starting rotation: 55 Bryce Elder; 66 Grant Holmes; 33 Martín Pérez; 51 Chris Sale; 99 Spencer Strider; Bullpen: 59 Carlos Carrasco; 46 Dylan Dodd; 72 Didier Fuentes; 26 Raisel Iglesias; 45 Tyler Kinley; 52 Dylan Lee; 40 Reynaldo López; 75 Robert Suárez; Catchers: 9 Sandy León; 16 Austin Wynns; Infielders: 1 Ozzie Albies; 14 Mauricio Dubón; 7 Ha-seong Kim; 2 Jorge Mateo; 28 Matt Olson; 27 Austin Riley; 8 Dominic Smith; Outfielders: 13 Ronald Acuña Jr.; 23 Michael Harris II; 36 Eli White; 18 Mike Yastrzemski	Pitchers: 79 Hayden Harris; 62 Daysbel Hernández; 81 Jhancarlos Lara; 58 Víctor Mederos; 61 Anthony Molina; 67 Rolddy Muñoz; 60 JR Ritchie; 65 Hunter Stratton; Catchers: 30 Drake Baldwin; -- Maverick Handley; Infielders: 24 Nacho Alvarez Jr.; 15 Kyle Farmer; 74 Jim Jarvis; Outfielders: -- DaShawn Keirsey Jr.	Manager: 22 Walt Weiss; Coaches: 88 Darnell Coles (assistant hitting); 83 Tony Diaz (assistant); 81 Dustin Garneau (catching); 85 Jeremy Hefner (pitching); 80 Tim Hyers (hitting); 10 Chipper Jones (hitting consultant); 89 Tony Mansolino (bench); 87 J.P. Martinez (bullpen); 98 Wigberto Nevarez (bullpen catcher); 95 Eddie Pérez (assistant); 86 Antoan Richardson (first base); 84 Tommy Watkins (third base); 96 José Yepez (bullpen catcher); 60-day injured list: 77 Joe Jiménez; 12 Sean Murphy; 56 Spencer Schwellenbach; 32 AJ Smith-Shawver; 64 Hurston Waldrep; 33 Joey Wentz; 63 Danny Young; Restricted list: 17 Jurickson Profar; 26 active, 14 inactive; 7-, 10-, or 15-day injured list; ^{#} Personal leave; Roster and coaches updated June 4, 2026; Transactions • Depth chart; → All MLB rosters

Miami Marlins roster
Active roster	Inactive roster	Coaches / other
Pitchers; Starting rotation: 22 Sandy Alcántara; 23 Max Meyer; Bullpen: 84 Lake Bachar; 37 Anthony Bender; 53 Calvin Faucher; 58 Cade Gibson; 65 Ryan Gusto; 71 William Kempner; 47 John King; 49 Michael Petersen; 30 Tyler Phillips; 55 Tyler Zuber; Closer(s): 29 Pete Fairbanks; Catchers: 34 Liam Hicks; 80 Joe Mack; Infielders: 9 Xavier Edwards; 19 Leo Jiménez; 6 Otto Lopez; 1 Connor Norby; 8 Javier Sanoja; Outfielders: 17 Owen Caissie; 13 Heriberto Hernández; 87 Jakob Marsee; 5 Christopher Morel; 3 Esteury Ruiz; 28 Kyle Stowers	Pitchers: 31 Bradley Blalock; 62 Zach Brzykcy; 95 Josh Ekness; 90 Dax Fulton; 20 Braxton Garrett; 26 Janson Junk; 39 Eury Pérez; 59 Josh White; Catchers: 50 Agustín Ramírez; Infielders: 24 Maximo Acosta; 63 Deyvison De Los Santos; 21 Graham Pauley; 68 Jared Serna; Outfielders: -- Rece Hinds	Manager: 86 Clayton McCullough; Coaches: 48 Blake Butler (infield); 82 Corbin Day (assistant hitting); 81 Craig Driver (first base / catching instructor); 97 Tanner Garrison (bullpen catcher); 85 Pedro Guerrero (hitting); 70 Chris Hess (assistant hitting); 45 Blake Lalli (third base); 72 Aaron Leanhardt (field coordinator); 56 Rob Marcello (assistant pitching); 52 Brandon Mann (bullpen / pitching strategist); 57 Daniel Moskos (pitching); -- Bryson Nakamura (performance); 25 Carson Vitale (bench); 98 Harry Wilonsky (bullpen catcher); 60-day injured list: 18 Griffin Conine; 32 Ronny Henriquez; 60 Adam Mazur; 43 Andrew Nardi; 61 Robby Snelling; 26 active, 14 inactive; 7-, 10-, or 15-day injured list; ^{#} Personal leave; Roster and coaches updated June 2, 2026; Transactions • Depth chart; → All MLB rosters

New York Mets roster
Active roster	Inactive roster	Coaches / other
Pitchers; Starting rotation: 59 Sean Manaea; 26 Nolan McLean; 51 Freddy Peralta; 45 Christian Scott; Bullpen: 43 Huascar Brazobán; 56 Joey Gerber; 33 A. J. Minter; 52 Cionel Pérez; 23 David Peterson; 25 Brooks Raley; 44 Austin Warren; 30 Luke Weaver; Closer(s): 38 Devin Williams; Catchers: 6 Hayden Senger; 13 Luis Torrens; Infielders: 7 Brett Baty; 19 Bo Bichette; 2 Vidal Bruján; 10 Marcus Semien; 27 Mark Vientos; 39 Eric Wagaman; 29 Jared Young; Outfielders: 3 Carson Benge; 9 A. J. Ewing; 22 Juan Soto; Designated hitters: 1 MJ Melendez	Pitchers: 84 Alex Carrillo; 54 Daniel Duarte; 32 Tobias Myers; 91 Jonathan Pintaro; 66 Dylan Ross; 34 Kodai Senga; 49 Zach Thornton; 21 Jonah Tong; Catchers: 4 Francisco Álvarez; Infielders: 12 Francisco Lindor; 0 Ronny Mauricio; 11 Jorge Polanco; Outfielders: 55 Nick Morabito; 28 Tyrone Taylor	Manager: 64 Carlos Mendoza; Coaches: 61 Jeff Albert (hitting); 68 J. P. Arencibia (catching); 79 Danny Barnes (quality control); 50 Kai Correa (bench); 80 Rafael Fernandez (assistant hitting); 65 Gilbert Gomez (first base and outfield); 78 Eric Langill (bullpen catcher); 63 Tim Leiper (third base and infield); 90 Kevin Mahoney (batting practice pitcher); 76 Dan McKinney (assistant pitching); 77 Dave Racaniello (bullpen catcher); 67 José Rosado (bullpen); 60 Troy Snitker (hitting); 62 Justin Willard (pitching); 60-day injured list: 75 Reed Garrett; 47 Justin Hagenman; 35 Clay Holmes; 58 Tylor Megill; 72 Dedniel Núñez; 88 Luis Robert Jr.; 26 active, 14 inactive; 7-, 10-, or 15-day injured list; ^{#} Personal leave; Roster and coaches updated June 3, 2026; Transactions • Depth chart; → All MLB rosters

Philadelphia Phillies roster
Active roster	Inactive roster	Coaches / other
Pitchers; Starting rotation: 44 Jesús Luzardo; 27 Aaron Nola; 24 Andrew Painter; 61 Cristopher Sánchez; 45 Zack Wheeler; Bullpen: 46 José Alvarado; 58 Tanner Banks; 52 Jonathan Bowlan; 40 Brad Keller; 50 Orion Kerkering; 37 Tim Mayza; 55 Chase Shugart; Closer(s): 59 Jhoan Durán; Catchers: 13 Rafael Marchán; 10 J. T. Realmuto; 21 Garrett Stubbs; Infielders: 28 Alec Bohm; 3 Bryce Harper; 33 Edmundo Sosa; 5 Bryson Stott; 7 Trea Turner; Outfielders: 39 Steward Berroa; 2 Justin Crawford; 53 Adolis García; 16 Brandon Marsh; Designated hitters: 12 Kyle Schwarber	Pitchers: 19 Kyle Backhus; 79 Jean Cabrera; 75 Moisés Chace; 47 Nolan Hoffman; -- Grant Holman; 51 Seth Johnson; 60 Max Lazar; 71 Alex McFarlane; 57 Alan Rangel; 79 Jackson Rutledge; Infielders: -- Christian Cairo; Outfielders: 4 Otto Kemp; 29 Félix Reyes; 85 Gabriel Rincones	Manager: 8 Don Mattingly (interim); Coaches: 95 Mike Calitri (major league field coordinator); 88 Anthony Contreras (third base); 65 Caleb Cotham (pitching); 96 Bobby Dickerson (infield); 38 Paco Figueroa (first base); 97 Brad Flanders (bullpen catcher); 35 Kevin Long (hitting); 96 Edwar Gonzalez (assistant hitting); 93 Mark Lowy (assistant pitching); 94 Rafael Pena (assistant hitting); 98 Hector Rabago (bullpen catcher); 91 Cesar Ramos (bullpen); 62 Dusty Wathan (bench); Restricted list: 23 Johan Rojas; 26 active, 14 inactive; 7-, 10-, or 15-day injured list; ^{#} Personal leave; Roster and coaches updated June 2, 2026; Transactions • Depth chart; → All MLB rosters

Washington Nationals roster
Active roster	Inactive roster	Coaches / other
Pitchers; Starting rotation: 24 Cade Cavalli; 22 Foster Griffin; 18 Zack Littell; 36 Miles Mikolas; Bullpen: 54 Andrew Alvarez; 39 Clayton Beeter; 74 Riley Cornelio; 41 Brad Lord; 55 Richard Lovelady; 70 Mitchell Parker; 64 Orlando Ribalta; 75 Paxton Schultz; 76 Gus Varland; Catchers: 14 Drew Millas; 20 Keibert Ruiz; Infielders: 5 CJ Abrams; 87 Andrés Chaparro; 2 Luis García Jr.; 45 Curtis Mead; 26 Nasim Nuñez; 8 José Tena; 84 Jorbit Vivas; Outfielders: 3 Dylan Crews; 4 Daylen Lile; 29 James Wood; 30 Jacob Young	Pitchers: 65 Julián Fernández; 79 Andre Granillo; 99 Cole Henry; 27 Jake Irvin; 57 Zak Kent; -- Carson Palmquist; 43 Luis Perales; 50 PJ Poulin; Catchers: 17 Harry Ford; Infielders: 12 Brady House; 81 Abimelec Ortiz; Outfielders: 33 Christian Franklin; 6 Robert Hassell III; 21 Joey Wiemer	Manager: 10 Blake Butera; Coaches: 83 Grant Anders (development); 60 Andrew Aydt (assistant hitting); 62 Matt Borgschulte (hitting); 63 Sean Doolittle (assistant pitching); 7 Víctor Estévez (third base/infield); 9 Michael Johns (bench); 68 Dustin Glant (assistant pitching/bullpen); 53 Simon Mathews (pitching); 67 Shawn O'Malley (assistant hitting); 23 Corey Ray (first base/outfield); 1 Tyler Smarslok (field); 88 Bobby Wilson (catching/run game); 60-day injured list: 40 Josiah Gray; 77 DJ Herz; 35 Max Kranick; 52 Ken Waldichuk; 32 Trevor Williams; 26 active, 14 inactive; 7-, 10-, or 15-day injured list; ^{#} Personal leave; Roster and coaches updated June 7, 2026; Transactions • Depth chart; → All MLB rosters

=== National League Central ===
Chicago Cubs roster
Active roster	Inactive roster	Coaches / other
Pitchers; Starting rotation: 32 Ben Brown; 30 Edward Cabrera; 18 Shota Imanaga; 53 Colin Rea; 50 Jameson Taillon; Bullpen: 72 Javier Assad; 88 Phil Maton; 41 Hoby Milner; 33 Ryan Rolison; 24 Caleb Thielbar; 49 Trent Thornton; 71 Jacob Webb; Closer(s): 48 Daniel Palencia; Catchers: 9 Miguel Amaya; 25 Moisés Ballesteros; 15 Carson Kelly; Infielders: 3 Alex Bregman; 29 Michael Busch; 2 Nico Hoerner; 75 Pedro Ramírez; 7 Dansby Swanson; Outfielders: 13 Kevin Alcántara; 20 Michael Conforto; 4 Pete Crow-Armstrong; 8 Ian Happ; 27 Seiya Suzuki; Designated hitters: 25 Moisés Ballesteros	Pitchers: 16 Matthew Boyd; 64 Tyler Ferguson; 46 Gavin Hollowell; 43 Luke Little; 51 Riley Martin; -- Doug Nikhazy; -- Luis Peralta; -- Christian Roa; 39 Ethan Roberts; 36 Jordan Wicks; Infielders: 6 Matt Shaw; 95 James Triantos; Outfielders: 1 Justin Dean	Manager: 11 Craig Counsell; Coaches: 0 Quintin Berry (third base); 63 Juan Cabreja (assistant hitting); 93 Erick Castillo (bullpen catcher); 84 Ryan Flaherty (bench); 68 Tommy Hottovy (pitching); 86 Casey Jacobson (assistant pitching); 65 Jose Javier (first base); 76 Dustin Kelly (hitting); 74 AJ Lewis (staff assistant); 85 Garrett Lloyd (bullpen catcher); 80 John Mallee (assistant hitting); 90 Jonathan Mota (major league coach); 81 Mark Strittmatter (bullpen); 60-day injured list: 17 Tyler Austin; 45 Hunter Harvey; 37 Porter Hodge; 22 Cade Horton; 77 Shelby Miller; 35 Justin Steele; 26 active, 13 inactive; 7-, 10-, or 15-day injured list; ^{#} Personal leave; Roster and coaches updated June 6, 2026; Transactions • Depth chart; → All MLB rosters

Cincinnati Reds roster
Active roster	Inactive roster	Coaches / other
Pitchers; Starting rotation: 41 Andrew Abbott; 26 Chase Burns; 40 Nick Lodolo; 25 Rhett Lowder; 51 Brady Singer; Bullpen: 70 Tejay Antone; 49 Brock Burke; 46 Caleb Ferguson; 78 Zach Maxwell; 62 Zach McCambley; 50 Sam Moll; 56 Chris Paddack; 64 Tony Santillan; Catchers: 65 P. J. Higgins; 37 Tyler Stephenson; Infielders: 2 Edwin Arroyo; 31 Nathaniel Lowe; 9 Matt McLain; 27 Sal Stewart; 28 Eugenio Suárez; Outfielders: 30 Will Benson; 22 JJ Bleday; 59 Blake Dunn; 4 Noelvi Marte; 17 Dane Myers; 7 Spencer Steer	Pitchers: 39 Julian Aguiar; 74 José Franco; 52 Pierce Johnson; 47 Luis Mey; 15 Emilio Pagán; 61 Chase Petty; 34 Connor Phillips; Catchers: 35 Jose Trevino; Infielders: 85 Leo Balcazar; 44 Elly De La Cruz; 3 Ke'Bryan Hayes; Outfielders: 29 TJ Friedl; 43 Héctor Rodríguez	Manager: 77 Terry Francona; Coaches: 92 Kyle Arnsberg (assistant coach); 45 Freddie Benavides (bench coach/field coordinator); 54 Collin Cowgill (first base); 91 Jose Duarte (bullpen catcher); 56 Willie Harris (third base); 36 Derek Johnson (director of pitching); 95 James Keller (bullpen catcher); 96 Simon Mathews (assistant pitching); 75 Mike Napoli (staff assistant); 93 Alex Pelaez (assistant hitting); 94 Will Remillard (assistant hitting); 90 Matt Tracy (bullpen); 76 Chris Valaika (hitting); 60-day injured list: 23 Graham Ashcraft; 21 Hunter Greene; 55 Brandon Williamson; 26 active, 13 inactive; 7-, 10-, or 15-day injured list; ^{#} Personal leave; Roster and coaches updated June 3, 2026; Transactions • Depth chart; → All MLB rosters

Milwaukee Brewers roster
Active roster	Inactive roster	Coaches / other
Pitchers; Starting rotation: 57 Coleman Crow; 55 Shane Drohan; 54 Robert Gasser; 52 Kyle Harrison; 32 Jacob Misiorowski; 23 Brandon Sproat; Bullpen: 56 Grant Anderson; 26 Aaron Ashby; 39 Chad Patrick; 38 Drew Rom; 45 Abner Uribe; 48 Craig Yoho; Closer(s): 29 Trevor Megill; Catchers: 24 William Contreras; 99 Gary Sánchez; Infielders: 9 Jake Bauers; 6 David Hamilton; 3 Joey Ortiz; 13 Luis Rengifo; 2 Brice Turang; 28 Andrew Vaughn; Outfielders: 11 Jackson Chourio; 10 Sal Frelick; 5 Garrett Mitchell; 16 Blake Perkins; Designated hitters: 22 Christian Yelich	Pitchers: 35 Brian Fitzpatrick; 37 DL Hall; 43 Logan Henderson; 47 Jared Koenig; -- Joel Kuhnel; 50 Easton McGee; 27 Carlos Rodríguez; 53 Brandon Woodruff; 58 Rob Zastryzny; Catchers: 15 Jeferson Quero; Infielders: 7 Tyler Black; -- Cooper Pratt; Outfielders: 25 Akil Baddoo; 20 Brandon Lockridge	Manager: 49 Pat Murphy; Coaches: 67 Spencer Allen (first base); 97 Christian Correa (bullpen catcher); 98 Néstor Corredor (field coordinator); 95 Daniel de Mondesert (game preparation specialist); 94 Ty Duvall (bullpen catcher); 68 Matt Erickson (third base); 88 Charlie Greene (bullpen); 71 Jim Henderson (pitching coordinator); 84 Chris Hook (pitching); 40 Jason Lane (offense and strategy coordinator); 96 Evan Martin (game preparation specialist); 91 Guillermo Martínez (hitting); 93 Juan Sandoval (assistant pitching); 85 Eric Theisen (lead hitting); 92 Daniel Vogelbach (hitting); 60-day injured list: 46 Quinn Priester; 61 Ángel Zerpa; 26 active, 14 inactive; 7-, 10-, or 15-day injured list; ^{#} Personal leave; Roster and coaches updated June 6, 2026; Transactions • Depth chart; → All MLB rosters

Pittsburgh Pirates roster
Active roster	Inactive roster	Coaches / other
Pitchers; Starting rotation: 35 Braxton Ashcraft; 36 Bubba Chandler; 17 Jared Jones; 23 Mitch Keller; 30 Paul Skenes; Bullpen: 77 Brandan Bidois; 86 Wilber Dotel; 50 Carmen Mlodzinski; 46 Mason Montgomery; 49 Yohan Ramírez; 48 Evan Sisk; 31 Gregory Soto; Closer(s): 60 Dennis Santana; Catchers: 32 Henry Davis; 13 Endy Rodríguez; Infielders: 3 Nick Gonzales; 2 Spencer Horwitz; 5 Brandon Lowe; 19 Jared Triolo; 53 Davis Wendzel; Outfielders: 37 Tyler Callihan; 15 Oneil Cruz; 28 Jake Mangum; 29 Ryan O'Hearn; 10 Bryan Reynolds; Designated hitters: 24 Marcell Ozuna	Pitchers: 45 Hunter Barco; 78 Thomas Harrington; 89 Antwone Kelly; 72 Isaac Mattson; 64 Cam Sanders; 65 José Urquidy; Catchers: 14 Joey Bart; 43 Rafael Flores; Infielders: 76 Jack Brannigan; 6 Konnor Griffin; 38 Nick Yorke; Outfielders: 25 Billy Cook; 34 Jhostynxon García; 55 Esmerlyn Valdez	Manager: 12 Don Kelly; Coaches: -- Cam Balego (bullpen catcher); 27 Tony Beasley (third base); 67 Cibney Bello (assistant pitching); 16 Tarrik Brock (first base); 82 Jordan Comadena (catching); 52 Matt Hague (hitting); 90 Raul Hernandez (bullpen catcher); 54 Gene Lamont (special assignment); 88 Christian Marrero (assistant hitting); 95 Stephen Morales (assistant coach); 51 Bill Murphy (pitching); 41 Kristopher Negrón (bench); 87 Miguel Pérez (bullpen); 44 Chris Truby (infield); 98 Jonny Tucker (assistant hitting); 60-day injured list: 57 Chris Devenski; 26 active, 14 inactive; 7-, 10-, or 15-day injured list; ^{#} Personal leave; Roster and coaches updated June 7, 2026; Transactions • Depth chart; → All MLB rosters

St. Louis Cardinals roster
Active roster	Inactive roster	Coaches / other
Pitchers; Starting rotation: 62 Kyle Leahy; 32 Matthew Liberatore; 3 Dustin May; 36 Michael McGreevy; 53 Andre Pallante; Bullpen: 47 Justin Bruihl; 40 Hunter Dobbins; 44 Gordon Graceffo; 59 JoJo Romero; 65 George Soriano; 55 Ryne Stanek; 49 Matt Svanson; Closer(s): 61 Riley O'Brien; Catchers: 8 Jimmy Crooks; 43 Pedro Pagés; Infielders: 41 Alec Burleson; 16 Nolan Gorman; 26 JJ Wetherholt; 0 Masyn Winn; Outfielders: 15 José Fermín; 21 Lars Nootbaar; 11 Victor Scott II; 39 Bryan Torres; 38 Nelson Velázquez; 18 Jordan Walker; Designated hitters: 48 Iván Herrera	Pitchers: 64 Ryan Fernandez; 35 Richard Fitts; 30 Tink Hence; 56 Cooper Hjerpe; 52 Brycen Mautz; -- Tekoah Roby; 58 Chris Roycroft; Catchers: 13 Leo Bernal; 63 Yohel Pozo; Infielders: 31 César Prieto; 29 Ramón Urías; Outfielders: 22 Joshua Báez; 27 Nathan Church; 25 Thomas Saggese	Manager: 37 Oliver Marmol; Coaches: 87 Brandon Allen (assistant hitting); 90 Dusty Blake (pitching); 73 Brant Brown (hitting); 88 Casey Chenoweth (assistant hitting); 82 Stubby Clapp (first base); 34 Daniel Descalso (bench); 86 Kyle Driscoll (assistant pitching); 19 Jon Jay (outfield/baserunning/quality control); 94 Jamie Pogue (assistant/bullpen); 74 Julio Rangel (assistant pitching/bullpen); 76 Kleininger Teran (bullpen catcher); 75 Ron 'Pop' Warner (third base); 26 active, 14 inactive; 7-, 10-, or 15-day injured list; ^{#} Personal leave; Roster and coaches updated June 5, 2026; Transactions • Depth chart; → All MLB rosters

=== National League West ===
Arizona Diamondbacks roster
Active roster	Inactive roster	Coaches / other
Pitchers; Starting rotation: 23 Zac Gallen; 29 Merrill Kelly; 19 Ryne Nelson; 57 Eduardo Rodríguez; 34 Michael Soroka; Bullpen: 45 Taylor Clarke; 55 Brandyn Garcia; 37 Kevin Ginkel; 99 Drey Jameson; 43 Jonathan Loáisiga; 62 Juan Morillo; 38 Paul Sewald; 81 Ryan Thompson; Catchers: 25 Adrian Del Castillo; 35 Aramis Garcia; 14 Gabriel Moreno; Infielders: 28 Nolan Arenado; 16 LuJames Groover; 4 Ketel Marte; 2 Geraldo Perdomo; 26 Pavin Smith; 9 Tommy Troy; 6 Ildemaro Vargas; Outfielders: 1 Jorge Barrosa; 7 Corbin Carroll; 15 Ryan Waldschmidt	Pitchers: 50 Philip Abner; 60 Mitch Bratt; 52 Juan Burgos; 30 Yilber Díaz; 58 Kohl Drake; 56 Andrew Hoffmann; 32 Brandon Pfaadt; 61 Dylan Ray; 24 Kade Strowd; Catchers: 8 James McCann; Infielders: 11 José Fernández; 31 Tyler Locklear; 13 Tim Tawa; Outfielders: 12 Lourdes Gurriel Jr.	Manager: 17 Torey Lovullo; Coaches: 82 Jeff Banister (bench); 76 Wellington Cepeda (bullpen); 73 Travis Denker (assistant hitting); 72 Owen Dew (assistant pitching); 75 Damion Easley (assistant hitting); 71 J. R. House (third base); 77 Brian Kaplan (pitching); 88 Shaun Larkin (infield); 74 Joe Mather (hitting); 36 Dave McKay (first base); 83 Jose Queliz (bullpen catcher); 84 Jonathan Solano (bullpen catcher); 60-day injured list: 39 Corbin Burnes; 10 Jordan Lawlar; 63 Justin Martínez; 64 Cristian Mena; 33 A. J. Puk; 27 Andrew Saalfrank; 41 Carlos Santana; 48 Blake Walston; Restricted list: -- Max Kepler; 26 active, 14 inactive; 7-, 10-, or 15-day injured list; ^{#} Personal leave; Roster and coaches updated June 7, 2026; Transactions • Depth chart; → All MLB rosters

Colorado Rockies roster
Active roster	Inactive roster	Coaches / other
Pitchers; Starting rotation: 18 Ryan Feltner; 21 Kyle Freeland; 24 Michael Lorenzen; 11 Tomoyuki Sugano; Bullpen: 36 Zach Agnos; 83 Brennan Bernardino; 63 Blas Castaño; 54 Seth Halvorsen; 0 Jaden Hill; 47 Juan Mejía; 57 Sammy Peralta; 49 Antonio Senzatela; 34 Keegan Thompson; Catchers: 37 Braxton Fulford; 15 Hunter Goodman; 26 Brett Sullivan; Infielders: 6 Edouard Julien; 12 Kyle Karros; 7 T. J. Rumfield; 39 Chad Stevens; 14 Ezequiel Tovar; Outfielders: 3 Willi Castro; 2 Tyler Freeman; 20 Troy Johnston; 31 Jake McCarthy; 30 Sterlin Thompson	Pitchers: 56 Valente Bellozo; 46 Jeff Criswell; 32 Chase Dollander; 29 Tanner Gordon; 44 Jimmy Herget; 43 Gabriel Hughes; 52 TJ Shook; 38 Victor Vodnik; Infielders: 1 Adael Amador; 8 Ryan Ritter; Outfielders: 27 Jordan Beck; 9 Brenton Doyle; 22 Mickey Moniak; 13 Zac Veen	Manager: 4 Warren Schaeffer; Coaches: 50 Doug Bernier (first base/outfield); 73 Matt Buschmann (bullpen); 75 Kyle Cunningham (asst. bullpen catcher); 53 Ronnie Gideon (asst. bench); 70 Andy González (third base); 77 Alon Leichman (pitching); 74 Jordan Pacheco (asst. hitting); 61 Jeff Pickler (bench); 72 Brett Pill (hitting); 76 Chris Rabago (bullpen catcher); 79 Gabe Ribas (asst. pitching); 60-day injured list: 51 McCade Brown; 23 Kris Bryant; 59 Welinton Herrera; 40 Pierson Ohl; 58 RJ Petit; 62 José Quintana; 26 active, 14 inactive; 7-, 10-, or 15-day injured list; ^{#} Personal leave; Roster and coaches updated June 7, 2026; Transactions • Depth chart; → All MLB rosters

Los Angeles Dodgers roster
Active roster	Inactive roster	Coaches / other
Pitchers; Starting rotation: 33 Eric Lauer; 11 Roki Sasaki; 80 Emmet Sheehan; 70 Justin Wrobleski; 18 Yoshinobu Yamamoto; Bullpen: 86 Jack Dreyer; 60 Edgardo Henriquez; 29 Jonathan Hernández; 63 Kyle Hurt; 61 Will Klein; 66 Tanner Scott; 49 Blake Treinen; 51 Alex Vesia; Two-way players: 17 Shohei Ohtani; Catchers: 68 Dalton Rushing; 16 Will Smith; Infielders: 50 Mookie Betts; 21 Santiago Espinal; 76 Alex Freeland; 5 Freddie Freeman; 13 Max Muncy; 72 Miguel Rojas; Outfielders: 12 Alex Call; 44 Andy Pages; 23 Kyle Tucker; 67 Ryan Ward	Pitchers: 57 Charlie Barnes; 56 Jake Eder; -- Nick Frasso; 65 Paul Gervase; 83 Ronan Kopp; 62 Chayce McDermott; 58 Wyatt Mills; 77 River Ryan; 41 Brock Stewart; Infielders: -- Tyler Fitzgerald; 8 Kiké Hernández; 6 Hyeseong Kim; Outfielders: 37 Teoscar Hernández; -- Alek Thomas	Manager: 30 Dave Roberts; Coaches: 54 Josh Bard (bullpen); 98 Aaron Bates (hitting); 91 Dino Ebel (third base); 88 Bob Geren (field coordinator); 0 Danny Lehmann (bench); 89 Brandon McDaniel (development integration); 87 Connor McGuiness (assistant pitching); 99 Mark Prior (pitching); 71 Robert Van Scoyoc (hitting); 84 Chris Woodward (first base); 60-day injured list: 78 Ben Casparius; -- Jake Cousins; 3 Edwin Díaz; 25 Tommy Edman; 31 Tyler Glasnow; 48 Brusdar Graterol; 96 Landon Knack; 28 Bobby Miller; 59 Evan Phillips; 7 Blake Snell; 35 Gavin Stone; 26 active, 14 inactive; 7-, 10-, or 15-day injured list; ^{#} Personal leave; Roster and coaches updated June 6, 2026; Transactions • Depth chart; → All MLB rosters

San Diego Padres roster
Active roster	Inactive roster	Coaches / other
Pitchers; Starting rotation: 10 Walker Buehler; 17 Griffin Canning; 55 Lucas Giolito; 34 Michael King; 98 Randy Vásquez; Bullpen: 40 Jason Adam; 97 Ron Marinaccio; 1 Yuki Matsui; 50 Adrián Morejón; 66 David Morgan; 58 Wandy Peralta; 72 Bradgley Rodríguez; Closer(s): 22 Mason Miller; Catchers: 48 Rodolfo Durán; 54 Freddy Fermin; Infielders: 41 Miguel Andújar; 2 Xander Bogaerts; 25 Ty France; 13 Manny Machado; 30 Gavin Sheets; 24 Sung-mun Song; 0 Samad Taylor; Outfielders: 4 Jase Bowen; 29 Bryce Johnson; 3 Jackson Merrill; 23 Fernando Tatís Jr.	Pitchers: 52 Ty Adcock; 76 Jhony Brito; 56 Jeremiah Estrada; 68 Kyle Hart; 59 Garrett Hawkins; 37 Alek Jacob; 33 Germán Márquez; 62 Miguel Méndez; 38 JP Sears; 61 Matt Waldron; Catchers: 12 Luis Campusano; Infielders: 9 Jake Cronenworth; 18 Mason McCoy; 7 Will Wagner	Manager: 14 Craig Stammen; Coaches: 86 Heberto Andrade (bullpen catcher/coaching assistant); 88 Chris Apecechea (assistant pitching); 81 Morgan Burkhart (major league coaching assistant); 82 Brian Esposito (major league coach); 53 Ben Fritz (bullpen); 81 Ryan Goins (infield); 70 Robby Hammock (field coordinator); 20 Bob Henley (third base/infield and base running instructor); 49 Randy Knorr (bench); 46 David Macias (first base/outfield and base running instructor); 89 Mike McCoy (assistant hitting); 57 Ruben Niebla (pitching); 85 Pat O'Sullivan (assistant hitting); 82 Kevin Plawecki (catching); 80 Nick Punto (major league coach); -- Scott Servais (coaching assistant); 28 Steven Souza Jr. (hitting); 87 Scott Stroud (coaching assistant); 83 Peter Summerville (game planning/coaching assistant); 60-day injured list: 78 Bryan Hoeing; 5 Ramón Laureano; 44 Joe Musgrove; 27 Nick Pivetta; Restricted list: 11 Yu Darvish; 26 active, 14 inactive; 7-, 10-, or 15-day injured list; ^{#} Personal leave; Roster and coaches updated June 5, 2026; Transactions • Depth chart; → All MLB rosters

San Francisco Giants roster
Active roster	Inactive roster	Coaches / other
Pitchers; Starting rotation: 12 Adrian Houser; 72 Trevor McDonald; 38 Robbie Ray; 65 Landen Roupp; 62 Logan Webb; Bullpen: 43 Tristan Beck; 34 JT Brubaker; 31 Sam Hentges; 45 Caleb Kilian; 68 Erik Miller; 77 Carson Seymour; 66 Dylan Smith; 67 Keaton Winn; Catchers: 18 Eric Haase; 6 Daniel Susac; Infielders: 2 Willy Adames; 1 Luis Arráez; 26 Matt Chapman; 16 Rafael Devers; 8 Bryce Eldridge; 41 Buddy Kennedy; 10 Casey Schmitt; Outfielders: 78 Víctor Bericoto; 53 Jonah Cox; 0 Drew Gilbert; 51 Jung Hoo Lee	Pitchers: 76 Spencer Bivens; 93 Matt Gage; 54 Tyler Mahle; 71 Wilkin Ramos; 57 Gregory Santos; 46 Blade Tidwell; 74 Ryan Walker; 88 Carson Whisenhunt; Catchers: 79 Jesús Rodríguez; Infielders: 50 Christian Koss; Outfielders: 9 Harrison Bader; 7 Will Brennan; 58 Grant McCray; 17 Heliot Ramos	Manager: 23 Tony Vitello; Coaches: 85 Frank Anderson (pitching director); 23 Ron Wotus (third base); 80 Héctor Borg (player development); 96 Oscar Bernard (assistant hitting); 97 Alex Burg (field coordinator/catching); 75 Jesse Chavez (bullpen); 84 Justin Meccage (pitching); 59 Hunter Mense (hitting); 82 Shane Robinson (first base); 33 Jayce Tingler (bench); 99 Taira Uematsu (quality control); 37 Ron Washington (infield); 92 Christian Wonders (assistant pitching); 98 Eliezer Zambrano (bullpen catcher); 60-day injured list: 60 Hayden Birdsong; 70 José Buttó; 64 Jason Foley; 56 Jared Oliva; 63 Joel Peguero; 73 Randy Rodríguez; 48 Reiver Sanmartín; -- Rowan Wick; 26 active, 14 inactive; 7-, 10-, or 15-day injured list; ^{#} Personal leave; Roster and coaches updated June 5, 2026; Transactions • Depth chart; → All MLB rosters

== See also ==
- List of current KBO League team rosters
- List of current Nippon Professional Baseball team rosters
