= 2027 Washington Nationals season =

2027 Washington Nationals
- League: National League
- Division: East
- Ballpark: Nationals Park
- City: Washington, D.C.
- Owners: Lerner Enterprises
- President of baseball operations: Paul Toboni
- General manager: Anirudh Kilambi
- Manager: Blake Butera
- Television: MLB Local Media (Dan Kolko, Kevin Frandsen, Alexa Datt)
- Radio: 106.7 The Fan; Washington Nationals Radio Network (Dave Jageler, Charlie Slowes)

The 2027 Washington Nationals season is scheduled to be the Nationals' 23rd season as the Major League Baseball franchise in the District of Columbia, the 20th season at Nationals Park, and the 59th since the original team was started in Montreal, Quebec, Canada. The Nationals would attempt to return to the playoffs for the first time since 2019, which is also their most recent World Series appearance.

The season is contingent on Major League Baseball (MLB) and the Major League Baseball Players Association (MLBPA) signing a new collective bargaining agreement (CBA). Without a new CBA, MLB is expected to lock out the players on December 2, 2026, until one is signed. If such a lockout extends indefinitely, the season could be postponed, shortened, or even cancelled.

== Offseason ==
The Nationals entered the offseason after posting a win/loss record of 77–85 in their 2026 season—their best record since the 2019 championship season, but still short of playoff contention.

The Nationals had no pending major league free agents at the start of the offseason, but they chose to cut several relievers who were at the fringes of the major league roster, including former starter Mitchell Parker and setup man PJ Poulin, as well as infielder/designated hitter José Tena, as corresponding moves for roster actions such as activating players from the 60-day injured list. The Nationals also designated former All-Star pitcher Josiah Gray, who returned to game action late in the 2026 season, for assignment as part of a series of roster moves on November 17.

After reaching an agreement with ace Cade Cavalli on a contract extension late in the 2026 season, the Nationals extended another member of their core, center fielder Jacob Young, for a reported four years at $23 million. President of Baseball Operations Paul Toboni said the Nationals were continuing to explore the possibility of more contract extensions for key players. Originally reported November 6, the Young extension was officially announced by the team on November 11.

Early in the offseason, the Nationals acquired three major leaguers from the San Francisco Giants in a series of transactions, claiming reliever Braxton Roxby off waivers and making minor trades for infielder Nate Furman and another reliever, Reiver Sanmartín. Washington subsequently waived Roxby and traded him to the Chicago Cubs for cash considerations.

With uncertainty over whether the Rule 5 draft will be held as scheduled in December, the Nationals chose to protect three prospects, all pitchers, who were eligible for selection, leaving several other notable minor leaguers potentially available to other teams. Top pitching prospects Jarlín Susana and Travis Sykora were added to the 40-man roster ahead of the protection deadline, along with fellow right-hander Alejandro Rosario, still recovering from Tommy John surgery he underwent early in 2026.

The Nationals tendered contracts to three arbitration-eligible players: right-handed pitchers Jake Bird and Jake Irvin and second baseman/shortstop CJ Abrams.

=== Offseason transactions ===
- September 28, 2026: The Nationals lost right-handed pitcher Chase Hampton on a waiver claim by the St. Louis Cardinals.
- October 29, 2026: The Nationals claimed right-handed pitcher Braxton Roxby off waivers from the San Francisco Giants and designated right-handed pitcher Zak Kent for assignment; Kent was released.
- November 1, 2026: The Nationals acquired infielder Nate Furman from the San Francisco Giants for minor league pitcher Tony Neubeck and designated left-handed pitcher Richard Lovelady for assignment; Lovelady elected free agency.
- November 2, 2026: The Nationals lost left-handed pitcher Mitchell Parker on a waiver claim by the 2027 Atlanta Braves and right-handed pitcher Paxton Schultz on a waiver claim by the Cincinnati Reds, designated infielder José Tena for assignment, and outrighted left-handed pitcher PJ Poulin and right-handed pitcher Ken Waldichuk to the minor leagues; Tena was claimed off waivers by the Cleveland Guardians, and Poulin and Waldichuk elected free agency.
- November 6, 2026: The Nationals acquired left-handed pitcher Reiver Sanmartín from the San Francisco Giants for minor league pitcher Robert Cranz and designated right-handed pitcher Kyle Nicolas for assignment; Nicolas was released.
- November 11, 2026: The Nationals signed center fielder Jacob Young to a four-year contract extension with a team option for the 2031 season.
- November 17, 2026: The Nationals claimed left-handed pitcher Philip Abner off waivers from the Baltimore Orioles, selected the contracts of right-handed pitchers Alejandro Rosario, Jarlín Susana, and Travis Sykora, and designated left-handed pitcher Carson Palmquist and right-handed pitchers Josiah Gray, Braxton Roxby, and Gus Varland for assignment; Palmquist and Gray were non-tendered and became free agents, and Varland was claimed off waivers by the New York Mets.
- November 18, 2026: The Nationals signed left-handed pitcher Omar Cruz and infielder Carlos Mendoza to minor league contracts with invitations to spring training.
- November 20, 2026: The Nationals traded right-handed pitcher Braxton Roxby to the Chicago Cubs for cash considerations and declined to tender a new contract to left-handed pitcher Jared Simpson.

== Game log ==
The 2027 schedule is tentative until a new collective bargaining agreement (CBA) is signed between Major League Baseball (MLB) and the Major League Baseball Players Association (MLBPA). If the labor dispute extends into late February or early March, MLB would then start to consider whether to postpone or shorten the season.

Legend
	Nationals win
	Nationals loss
	Postponement
**Bold**	Nationals team member

2027 Game Log: 0–0 (Home: 0–0; Road: 0–0)
March/April: 0–0 (Home: 0–0; Road: 0–0)

#	Date	Opponent	Score	Win	Loss	Save	Attendance	Record	Streak
1	March 25	Phillies	—	—	—	—	—	–	—
2	March 27	Phillies	—	—	—	—	—	–	—
3	March 28	Phillies	—	—	—	—	—	–	—
4	March 29	Mets	—	—	—	—	—	–	—
5	March 30	Mets	—	—	—	—	—	–	—
6	March 31	Mets	—	—	—	—	—	–	—
7	April 1	@ Phillies	—	—	—	—	—	–	—
8	April 2	@ Phillies	—	—	—	—	—	–	—
9	April 3	@ Phillies	—	—	—	—	—	–	—
10	April 4	@ Phillies	—	—	—	—	—	–	—
11	April 6	@ Twins	—	—	—	—	—	–	—
12	April 7	@ Twins	—	—	—	—	—	–	—
13	April 8	@ Twins	—	—	—	—	—	–	—
14	April 9	Red Sox	—	—	—	—	—	–	—
15	April 10	Red Sox	—	—	—	—	—	–	—
16	April 11	Red Sox	—	—	—	—	—	–	—
17	April 13	Braves	—	—	—	—	—	–	—
18	April 14	Braves	—	—	—	—	—	–	—
19	April 15	Braves	—	—	—	—	—	–	—
20	April 16	@ Yankees	—	—	—	—	—	–	—
21	April 17	@ Yankees	—	—	—	—	—	–	—
22	April 18	@ Yankees	—	—	—	—	—	–	—
23	April 20	@ Braves	—	—	—	—	—	–	—
24	April 21	@ Braves	—	—	—	—	—	–	—
25	April 22	@ Braves	—	—	—	—	—	–	—
26	April 23	Dodgers	—	—	—	—	—	–	—
27	April 24	Dodgers	—	—	—	—	—	–	—
28	April 25	Dodgers	—	—	—	—	—	–	—
29	April 26	Rangers	—	—	—	—	—	–	—
30	April 27	Rangers	—	—	—	—	—	–	—
31	April 28	Rangers	—	—	—	—	—	–	—
32	April 30	@ Pirates	—	—	—	—	—	–	—

May: 0–0 (Home: 0–0; Road: 0–0)

#	Date	Opponent	Score	Win	Loss	Save	Attendance	Record	Streak
33	May 1	@ Pirates	—	—	—	—	—	–	—
34	May 2	@ Pirates	—	—	—	—	—	–	—
35	May 3	@ Marlins	—	—	—	—	—	–	—
36	May 4	@ Marlins	—	—	—	—	—	–	—
37	May 5	@ Marlins	—	—	—	—	—	–	—
38	May 6	@ Marlins	—	—	—	—	—	–	—
39	May 7	@ Astros	—	—	—	—	—	–	—
40	May 8	@ Astros	—	—	—	—	—	–	—
41	May 9	@ Astros	—	—	—	—	—	–	—
42	May 11	Rockies	—	—	—	—	—	–	—
43	May 12	Rockies	—	—	—	—	—	–	—
44	May 13	Rockies	—	—	—	—	—	–	—
45	May 14	Guardians	—	—	—	—	—	–	—
46	May 15	Guardians	—	—	—	—	—	–	—
47	May 16	Guardians	—	—	—	—	—	–	—
48	May 18	@ Royals	—	—	—	—	—	–	—
49	May 19	@ Royals	—	—	—	—	—	–	—
50	May 20	@ Royals	—	—	—	—	—	–	—
51	May 21	@ Cubs	—	—	—	—	—	–	—
52	May 22	@ Cubs	—	—	—	—	—	–	—
53	May 23	@ Cubs	—	—	—	—	—	–	—
54	May 25	Orioles	—	—	—	—	—	–	—
55	May 26	Orioles	—	—	—	—	—	–	—
56	May 27	Orioles	—	—	—	—	—	–	—
57	May 28	Marlins	—	—	—	—	—	–	—
58	May 29	Marlins	—	—	—	—	—	–	—
59	May 30	Marlins	—	—	—	—	—	–	—
60	May 31	@ Giants	—	—	—	—	—	–	—

June: 0–0 (Home: 0–0; Road: 0–0)

#	Date	Opponent	Score	Win	Loss	Save	Attendance	Record	Streak
61	June 1	@ Giants	—	—	—	—	—	–	—
62	June 2	@ Giants	—	—	—	—	—	–	—
63	June 4	@ Mariners	—	—	—	—	—	–	—
64	June 5	@ Mariners	—	—	—	—	—	–	—
65	June 6	@ Mariners	—	—	—	—	—	–	—
66	June 8	Rays	—	—	—	—	—	–	—
67	June 9	Rays	—	—	—	—	—	–	—
68	June 10	Rays	—	—	—	—	—	–	—
69	June 11	Diamondbacks	—	—	—	—	—	–	—
70	June 12	Diamondbacks	—	—	—	—	—	–	—
71	June 13	Diamondbacks	—	—	—	—	—	–	—
72	June 14	@ Cardinals	—	—	—	—	—	–	—
73	June 15	@ Cardinals	—	—	—	—	—	–	—
74	June 16	@ Cardinals	—	—	—	—	—	–	—
75	June 17	@ Cardinals	—	—	—	—	—	–	—
76	June 18	@ Mets	—	—	—	—	—	–	—
77	June 19	@ Mets	—	—	—	—	—	–	—
78	June 20	@ Mets	—	—	—	—	—	–	—
79	June 22	Cardinals	—	—	—	—	—	–	—
80	June 23	Cardinals	—	—	—	—	—	–	—
81	June 24	Cardinals	—	—	—	—	—	–	—
82	June 25	@ Brewers	—	—	—	—	—	–	—
83	June 26	@ Brewers	—	—	—	—	—	–	—
84	June 27	@ Brewers	—	—	—	—	—	–	—
85	June 28	@ Dodgers	—	—	—	—	—	–	—
86	June 29	@ Dodgers	—	—	—	—	—	–	—
87	June 30	@ Dodgers	—	—	—	—	—	–	—

July: 0–0 (Home: 0–0; Road: 0–0)

#	Date	Opponent	Score	Win	Loss	Save	Attendance	Record	Streak
88	July 2	Athletics	—	—	—	—	—	–	—
89	July 3	Athletics	—	—	—	—	—	–	—
90	July 4	Athletics	—	—	—	—	—	–	—
91	July 6	Brewers	—	—	—	—	—	–	—
92	July 7	Brewers	—	—	—	—	—	–	—
93	July 8	Brewers	—	—	—	—	—	–	—
94	July 9	Phillies	—	—	—	—	—	–	—
95	July 10	Phillies	—	—	—	—	—	–	—
96	July 11	Phillies	—	—	—	—	—	–	—
**All–Star Break (July 12–15)**
97	July 16	@ Orioles	—	—	—	—	—	–	—
98	July 17	@ Orioles	—	—	—	—	—	–	—
99	July 18	@ Orioles	—	—	—	—	—	–	—
100	July 19	@ Marlins	—	—	—	—	—	–	—
101	July 20	@ Marlins	—	—	—	—	—	–	—
102	July 21	@ Marlins	—	—	—	—	—	–	—
103	July 22	Braves	—	—	—	—	—	–	—
104	July 23	Braves	—	—	—	—	—	–	—
105	July 24	Braves	—	—	—	—	—	–	—
106	July 25	Braves	—	—	—	—	—	–	—
107	July 26	Cubs	—	—	—	—	—	–	—
108	July 27	Cubs	—	—	—	—	—	–	—
109	July 28	Cubs	—	—	—	—	—	–	—
110	July 30	@ Reds	—	—	—	—	—	–	—
111	July 31	@ Reds	—	—	—	—	—	–	—

August: 0–0 (Home: 0–0; Road: 0–0)

#	Date	Opponent	Score	Win	Loss	Save	Attendance	Record	Streak
112	August 1	@ Reds	—	—	—	—	—	–	—
113	August 3	Pirates	—	—	—	—	—	–	—
114	August 4	Pirates	—	—	—	—	—	–	—
115	August 5	Pirates	—	—	—	—	—	–	—
116	August 6	@ Mets	—	—	—	—	—	–	—
117	August 7	@ Mets	—	—	—	—	—	–	—
118	August 8	@ Mets	—	—	—	—	—	–	—
119	August 10	@ Blue Jays	—	—	—	—	—	–	—
120	August 11	@ Blue Jays	—	—	—	—	—	–	—
121	August 12	@ Blue Jays	—	—	—	—	—	–	—
122	August 13	Padres	—	—	—	—	—	–	—
123	August 14	Padres	—	—	—	—	—	–	—
124	August 15	Padres	—	—	—	—	—	–	—
125	August 16	Padres	—	—	—	—	—	–	—
126	August 17	Giants	—	—	—	—	—	–	—
127	August 18	Giants	—	—	—	—	—	–	—
128	August 19	Giants	—	—	—	—	—	–	—
129	August 20	@ Padres	—	—	—	—	—	–	—
130	August 21	@ Padres	—	—	—	—	—	–	—
131	August 22	@ Padres	—	—	—	—	—	–	—
132	August 23	@ Diamondbacks	—	—	—	—	—	–	—
133	August 24	@ Diamondbacks	—	—	—	—	—	–	—
134	August 25	@ Diamondbacks	—	—	—	—	—	–	—
135	August 27	Tigers	—	—	—	—	—	–	—
136	August 28	Tigers	—	—	—	—	—	–	—
137	August 29	Tigers	—	—	—	—	—	–	—
138	August 30	Reds	—	—	—	—	—	–	—
139	August 31	Reds	—	—	—	—	—	–	—

September: 0–0 (Home: 0–0; Road: 0–0)

#	Date	Opponent	Score	Win	Loss	Save	Attendance	Record	Streak
140	September 1	Reds	—	—	—	—	—	–	—
141	September 3	Marlins	—	—	—	—	—	–	—
142	September 4	Marlins	—	—	—	—	—	–	—
143	September 5	Marlins	—	—	—	—	—	–	—
144	September 6	@ Angels	—	—	—	—	—	–	—
145	September 7	@ Angels	—	—	—	—	—	–	—
146	September 8	@ Angels	—	—	—	—	—	–	—
147	September 10	@ Rockies	—	—	—	—	—	–	—
148	September 11	@ Rockies	—	—	—	—	—	–	—
149	September 12	@ Rockies	—	—	—	—	—	–	—
150	September 13	Mets	—	—	—	—	—	–	—
151	September 14	Mets	—	—	—	—	—	–	—
152	September 15	Mets	—	—	—	—	—	–	—
153	September 16	Mets	—	—	—	—	—	–	—
154	September 17	White Sox	—	—	—	—	—	–	—
155	September 18	White Sox	—	—	—	—	—	–	—
156	September 19	White Sox	—	—	—	—	—	–	—
157	September 21	@ Braves	—	—	—	—	—	–	—
158	September 22	@ Braves	—	—	—	—	—	–	—
159	September 23	@ Braves	—	—	—	—	—	–	—
160	September 24	@ Phillies	—	—	—	—	—	–	—
161	September 25	@ Phillies	—	—	—	—	—	–	—
162	September 26	@ Phillies	—	—	—	—	—	–	—

== Current roster ==
Washington Nationals 2027 spring training roster
40-man roster		Non-roster invitees	Coaches / other
Pitchers: -- Philip Abner; 54 Andrew Alvarez; 39 Clayton Beeter; 17 Jake Bird; 24 Cade Cavalli; 74 Riley Cornelio; 48 Yovanny Cruz; 76 Will Dion; 19 Connelly Early; 77 DJ Herz; 27 Jake Irvin; 25 Jackson Kent; 41 Brad Lord; 43 Luis Perales; 64 Orlando Ribalta; -- Alejandro Rosario; -- Reiver Sanmartín; 49 Jack Sinclair; -- Jarlín Susana; -- Travis Sykora; 73 Erik Tolman; 55 Matt Waldron; 46 Eddy Yean	Catchers: 17 Harry Ford; 14 Drew Millas; 20 Keibert Ruiz; Infielders: 5 CJ Abrams; 87 Andrés Chaparro; -- Nate Furman; 12 Brady House; 28 Yohandy Morales; 26 Nasim Nuñez; 81 Abimelec Ortiz; 84 Jorbit Vivas; Outfielders: 3 Dylan Crews; 4 Daylen Lile; 45 Andrew Pinckney; 29 James Wood; 30 Jacob Young	Pitchers: -- Omar Cruz; -- Hagen Danner; Infielders: -- Carlos Mendoza	Manager: 10 Blake Butera; Coaches: 83 Grant Anders (development); 60 Andrew Aydt (assistant hitting); 62 Matt Borgschulte (hitting); 63 Sean Doolittle (assistant pitching); 7 Víctor Estévez (third base/infield); 9 Michael Johns (bench); 68 Dustin Glant (assistant pitching/bullpen); 53 Simon Mathews (pitching); 67 Shawn O'Malley (assistant hitting); 23 Corey Ray (first base/outfield); 88 Bobby Wilson (catching/run game); 39 active, 0 inactive, 3 non-roster invitees; 7-, 10-, or 15-day injured list; * Not on active roster; ^{†} Suspended list; Roster, coaches, and NRIs updated November 20, 2026; Transactions • Depth chart; → All MLB rosters

== Farm system ==
Level	Team	League	Manager
Triple-A	Rochester Red Wings	International League	
Double-A	Harrisburg Senators	Eastern League	
High-A	Wilmington Blue Rocks	South Atlantic League	
Low-A	Fredericksburg Nationals	Carolina League	
Rookie	FCL Nationals	Florida Complex League	
Rookie	DSL Nationals	Dominican Summer League	
