= Matt Borgschulte =

American baseball player and coach (born 1990)

Washington Nationals – No. 62
- Coach
- Born: October 29, 1990 (age 35); St. Louis, Missouri, U.S.
- Stats at Baseball Reference

Teams
- As coach: Baltimore Orioles (2022–2024); Minnesota Twins (2025); Washington Nationals (2026–present)

Matthew Borgschulte (born October 29, 1990) is an American professional baseball coach for the Washington Nationals of Major League Baseball (MLB). He has previously served as the hitting coach for the Baltimore Orioles and Minnesota Twins.

== Playing career ==
Borgschulte attended Parkway Central High School in Chesterfield, Missouri. He attended Western Kentucky University and Drury University, where he played college baseball for the Western Kentucky Hilltoppers and the Drury Panthers.

== Coaching career ==
Borgschulte was the hitting coach for Southeast Missouri State University in 2015 and 2016. He joined the Minnesota Twins organization in 2018 as the hitting coach for the Gulf Coast League Twins. In 2019, he was hitting coach for the Fort Myers Miracle, and he was promoted to be the hitting coach for the Rochester Red Wings in the 2020 season.

In 2021, Borgschulte was the hitting coach for the St. Paul Saints. After the 2021 season, the Baltimore Orioles hired Borgschulte and Ryan Fuller as co-hitting coaches.

On October 14, 2024, Borgschulte left the Orioles to become the primary hitting coach for the Minnesota Twins. On November 13, 2025, the Twins hired Keith Beauregard as their hitting coach, replacing Borgschulte.

On December 8, 2025, Borgschulte joined the coaching staff of the Washington Nationals as hitting coach under manager Blake Butera, reuniting with development coach Grant Anders after both served in those respective roles on the 2024 Orioles staff.
