= Ty Johnson (baseball) =

American baseball player (born 2001)

Tampa Bay Rays – No. 55
- Pitcher
- Born: September 25, 2001 (age 25); Rockwall, Texas, U.S.
- Bats: Left Throws: Right

MLB debut
- September 6, 2026, for the Tampa Bay Rays

MLB statistics (through 2026 season)
- Win–loss record: 0–0
- Earned run average: 3.52
- Strikeouts: 11
- Stats at Baseball Reference

Teams
- Tampa Bay Rays (2026–present)

Ty Roman Johnson (born September 25, 2001) is an American professional baseball pitcher for the Tampa Bay Rays of Major League Baseball (MLB).

== Amateur career ==
Johnson attended Lawrence North High School in Indianapolis, Indiana and played college baseball at Ball State University. In 2022, he played collegiate summer baseball with the Cotuit Kettleers of the Cape Cod Baseball League.

== Professional career ==
Johnson was selected by the Chicago Cubs in the 15th round of the 2023 Major League Baseball draft.

Johnson started his professional career in 2024 with the debut with the Myrtle Beach Pelicans and South Bend Cubs. On July 28, 2024 the Cubs traded Johnson, Christopher Morel and Hunter Bigge to the Tampa Bay Rays in exchange for Isaac Paredes. He began his Rays career that year with the Bowling Green Hot Rods. Johnson started 2025 with the Double–A Montgomery Biscuits.

Johnson began the 2026 season with the Triple–A Durham Bulls, posting a 4–1 record and 3.03 ERA with 84 strikeouts across 21 appearances (10 starts). On September 5, 2026, Johnson was selected to the 40–man roster and promoted to the major leagues for the first time.
