= Ryan Fuller =

American baseball coach (born 1990)

Chicago White Sox
- Director of Hitting
- Born: May 2, 1990 (age 36); Lyme, Connecticut, U.S.
- Bats: Right Throws: Right
- Stats at Baseball Reference

Teams
- As coach: Baltimore Orioles (2022–2024); Chicago White Sox (2024–present)

Ryan J. Fuller (born May 2, 1990) is an American professional baseball coach.

== Career ==
Fuller graduated from Lyme-Old Lyme High School in Old Lyme, Connecticut. He enrolled at the University of Connecticut's Avery Point campus, and played for their baseball team in 2009 and 2010. He transferred to the main campus of the university and played his final two college baseball seasons with the Connecticut Huskies where he was team captain. He spent one season with the Arizona Diamondbacks organization, and then was a teacher and coach for Haddam-Killingworth High School from 2013 to 2019.

Fuller joined the Baltimore Orioles organization in 2019 as a minor league hitting coach. In 2021, he was named hitting coordinator and hitting coach for the Double–A Bowie Baysox. Following the 2021 season, he was promoted to the major league staff as hitting coach for the Orioles, serving alongside Matt Borgschulte. On October 11, 2024, Fuller and the Orioles parted ways.

On November 14, 2024, Fuller was hired by the Chicago White Sox to serve as the team's Director of Hitting.

In his second season leading the White Sox offense, the team led the American League in runs, walks, and runs batted in, and advanced to the ALDS.
