= Dustin Glant =

American baseball player and coach (born 1981)

Washington Nationals – No. 68
- Pitcher / Bullpen coach
- Born: July 20, 1981 (age 45); Decatur, Indiana, U.S.
- Bats: Right Throws: Right

Teams
- As coach: Washington Nationals (2026–present)

Dustin Willis Glant (born July 20, 1981) is an American professional baseball coach for the Washington Nationals of Major League Baseball (MLB).

== Baseball career ==
=== Pitcher ===
Glant pitched collegiately for Purdue University before he was drafted in the seventh round of the 2003 Major League Baseball draft by the Arizona Diamondbacks. Glant chose to sign with the Diamondbacks and turn pro. Although Glant reached Class-AAA, spending the 2008 season with the Tucson Sidewinders, he struggled to a 7.51 ERA that season and was released. Glant attempted to keep his career going as a pitcher in the independent leagues, but after he was released by the Winnipeg Goldeyes of the American Association midway through another difficult 2011 season, he retired from pitching professionally.

=== Coach ===
After his playing career came to an end, Glant went into coaching at the high school and college levels, working at schools in Florida and his home state of Indiana—including Anderson University, where he became head coach in 2016, and Ball State University, where he was pitching coach from 2016 to 2019. He was hired away from the college ranks by the New York Yankees in 2019. After serving as pitching coach for the Class-AAA Scranton/Wilkes-Barre RailRiders in 2021, Glant returned to collegiate baseball. He worked as pitching coach at Indiana University from 2022 to 2025.

Glant left Indiana to become assistant pitching/bullpen coach for the Washington Nationals under first-year manager Blake Butera and pitching coach Simon Mathews ahead of the 2026 season, becoming one of relatively few coaches to go directly from a collegiate staff onto a major league staff.
