= Derek Johnson (baseball) =

American baseball coach (born 1971)

- Coach
- Born: July 16, 1971 (age 55); Gibson City, Illinois, U.S

Teams
- Milwaukee Brewers (2016–2018); Cincinnati Reds (2019–2026)

Career highlights and awards
- Baseball America Major League Coach of the Year (2019)

Derek Johnson (born July 16, 1971) is an American professional baseball coach. He was recently the director of pitching for the Cincinnati Reds of Major League Baseball (MLB). He has also served as the pitching coach for the Milwaukee Brewers of MLB and in college baseball for the Eastern Illinois Panthers, Southern Illinois Salukis, Stetson Hatters, and Vanderbilt Commodores.

== Early life and career ==
Johnson was born in Gibson City, Illinois. He graduated from University High School in Normal, Illinois, in 1989. Johnson attended Eastern Illinois University, where he played college baseball for the Eastern Illinois Panthers.

After graduating from Eastern Illinois, he remained with the program as a pitching coach for the 1994 season. He coached in college baseball for the Southern Illinois Salukis of Southern Illinois University from 1995 through 1997, and the Stetson Hatters of Stetson University from 1998 through 2001.

Johnson was the pitching coach of the Vanderbilt Commodores baseball team from 2002 to 2012. In 2010, he was named the ABCA/Baseball America Assistant Coach of the Year. In 2012, he left Vanderbilt to be the minor league pitching coordinator for the Chicago Cubs. Prior to the 2016 season, the Milwaukee Brewers hired Johnson to be their pitching coach. After the 2018 season he quit the job with the Brewers to take on the same position with the Cincinnati Reds. Baseball America named Johnson the major league coach of the year in 2019. After the 2021 season, the Reds promoted Johnson to director of pitching, in addition to his duties as pitching coach, and signed him to a contract extension.

In June 2026, Johnson took an indefinite leave of absence from the Reds. The reason was never revealed, and his absence eventually caused him to miss the remainder of the season. Assistant pitching coach Matt Tracy took over as pitching coach for the remainder of the season. The Reds eventually dismissed Johnson as pitching coach after the season.

== Personal life ==
Johnson and his wife, Tasha, have two children, Teague and Taite. They live in Nashville, Tennessee, during the offseason.
