= Drew Millas =

American baseball player (born 1998)

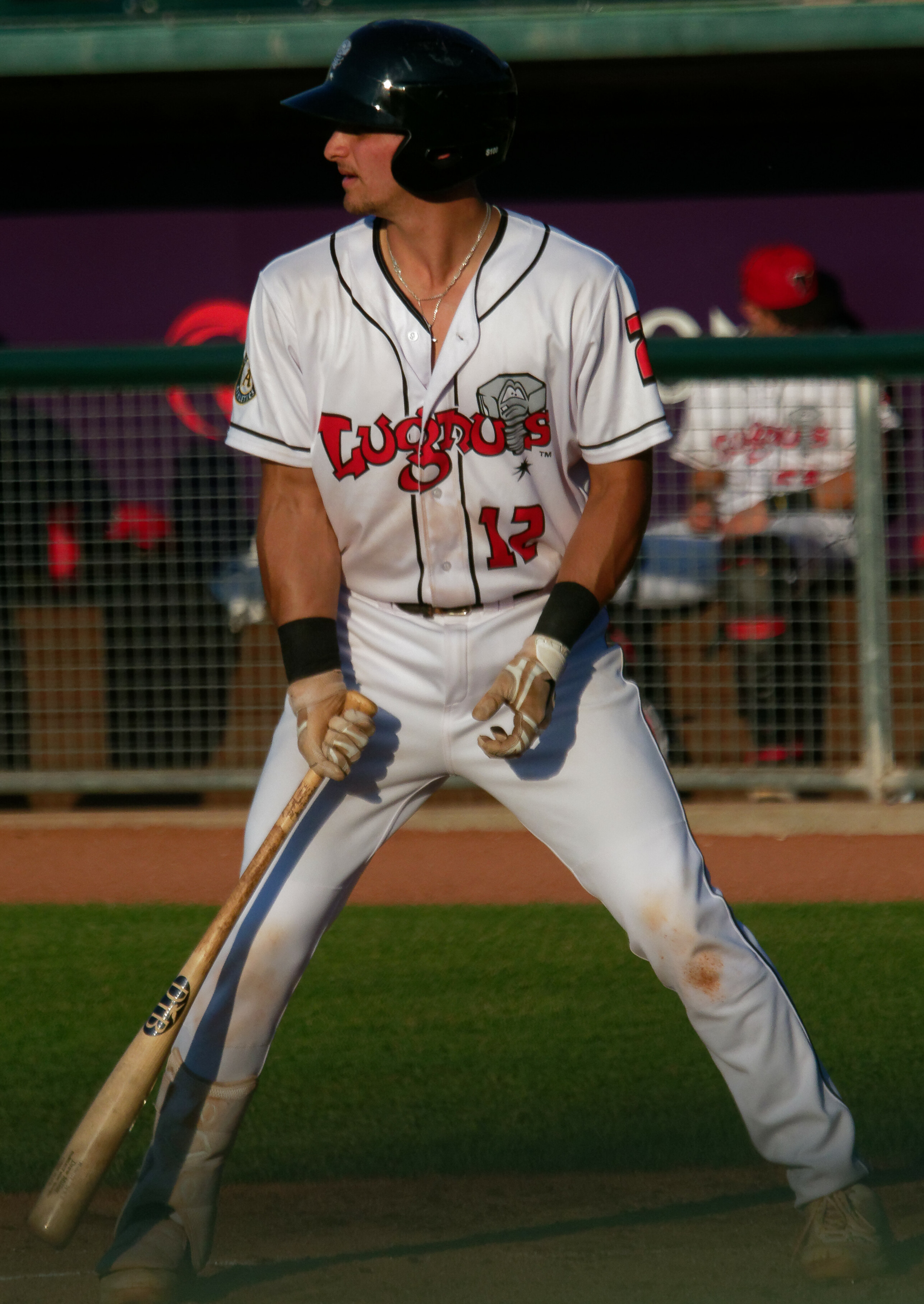
- Millas with the Lansing Lugnuts in 2021

Washington Nationals – No. 14
- Catcher
- Born: January 15, 1998 (age 28); St. Louis, Missouri, U.S.
- Bats: Switch Throws: Right

MLB debut
- August 28, 2023, for the Washington Nationals

MLB statistics (through 2026 season)
- Batting average: .231
- Home runs: 4
- Runs batted in: 25
- Stats at Baseball Reference

Teams
- Washington Nationals (2023–present)

Andrew Theodore Millas (born January 15, 1998) is an American professional baseball catcher for the Washington Nationals of Major League Baseball (MLB). He made his MLB debut in 2023.

== Career ==
=== Amateur career ===
Millas attended Belleville East High School in Belleville, Illinois. He attended Missouri State University and played college baseball for three years with the Missouri State Bears as a catcher. In 2018, he played collegiate summer baseball with the Wareham Gatemen of the Cape Cod Baseball League.

=== Oakland Athletics ===
The Oakland Athletics selected Millas in the seventh round, with the 224th overall selection, of the 2019 Major League Baseball draft. He was regarded as one of the top catching prospects in the draft and perhaps the best prospect in the Missouri Valley Conference. Millas signed with Oakland, but he did not make his professional debut until 2021, as he was held out of minor league games in 2019 and the 2020 minor league season was canceled due to the COVID-19 pandemic. In 59 games for the High–A Lansing Lugnuts, Millas hit .255/.372/.359 with 3 home runs, 28 RBI, and 10 stolen bases.

=== Washington Nationals ===
On July 30, 2021, the Athletics traded Millas, Richard Guasch, and Seth Shuman to the Washington Nationals in exchange for veteran catcher Yan Gomes and utilityman Josh Harrison. Millas was assigned to the High-A Wilmington Blue Rocks after the trade, where he hit .284 in 27 games. He was one of eight Nationals prospects to play for the Surprise Saguaros of the Arizona Fall League in 2021. In 2022, Millas split the year between the Single–A Fredericksburg Nationals, Wilmington, and the Double–A Harrisburg Senators. In 88 total games, he batted a cumulative .225/.340/.350 with six home runs, 36 RBI, and eight stolen bases.

Millas began the 2023 season with Harrisburg before being promoted to Triple–A Rochester Red Wings in late May. In 58 games for Rochester, he hit .270/.362/.403 with 3 home runs and 24 RBI. On August 28, 2023, Millas was selected to the 40-man roster and promoted to the major leagues for the first time. In 11 games during his rookie campaign, he batted .286/.375/.464 with one home run and six RBI.

Millas was optioned to the Triple–A Rochester to begin the 2024 season. He was then called up on April 10. In 20 appearances for the Nationals, Millas slashed .246/.306/.316 with one home run, one RBI, and four stolen bases.

Millas was optioned to Triple-A Rochester to begin the 2025 season. He was recalled to the Nationals on June 29, 2025. In his season debut, Millas scored two runs and drove in the winning run with a double in the 11th inning against the Los Angeles Angels. In 18 appearances for Washington, he batted .306/.358/.449 with seven RBI and two stolen bases. On August 29, Millas underwent season-ending surgery on his left index finger following the diagnosis of a fracture and dislocation.

On July 18, 2026, manager Blake Butera announced that Millas had undergone surgery on his left index finger.

== Personal life ==
Millas got engaged on July 12, 2023, to Ashley. The couple was married on December 14, 2024, in St Louis, Missouri.
