= Isaac Paredes =

Mexican baseball player (born 1999)

Houston Astros – No. 15
- Third baseman
- Born: February 18, 1999 (age 27); Hermosillo, Mexico
- Bats: Right Throws: Right

MLB debut
- August 17, 2020, for the Detroit Tigers

MLB statistics (through 2026 season)
- Batting average: .242
- Home runs: 117
- Runs batted in: 381
- Stats at Baseball Reference

Teams
- Detroit Tigers (2020–2021); Tampa Bay Rays (2022–2024); Chicago Cubs (2024); Houston Astros (2025–present)

Career highlights and awards
- 2× All-Star (2024, 2025)
Medals
Men's baseball
Representing Mexico
World Baseball Classic
Bronze medal – third place	2023 Miami	Team

Isaac Edgardo Paredes Calderón (born February 18, 1999) is a Mexican professional baseball third baseman for the Houston Astros of Major League Baseball (MLB). He has previously played in MLB for the Detroit Tigers, Tampa Bay Rays, and Chicago Cubs.

Paredes signed with the Cubs as an amateur free agent in 2015 and was traded to the Tigers in 2017. He made his MLB debut with the Tigers in 2020 and was traded to the Rays after the 2021 season. Paredes, an All-Star with the Rays in 2024, was traded later that season to the Cubs. He was then traded again in 2025 to the Astros, where he made his second All-Star appearance.

== Professional career ==
=== Chicago Cubs (2016–2017) ===
Paredes signed with the Chicago Cubs as an international free agent in July 2015. He made his professional debut in 2016 with the Arizona League Cubs and posted a .305 batting average with one home run and 26 RBIs in 47 games. He played in three games with the South Bend Cubs that season. He started 2017 with the South Bend Cubs.

=== Detroit Tigers (2017–2022) ===
On July 31, 2017, the Cubs traded Paredes and Jeimer Candelario to the Detroit Tigers in exchange for Alex Avila and Justin Wilson. The Tigers assigned him to the West Michigan Whitecaps where he spent the remainder of the season. In 124 total games between South Bend and West Michigan he batted .252 with 11 home runs and 70 RBIs. After the 2017 season, he played for Yaquis de Obregón of the Mexican Pacific League (LMP). In 2018, Paredes spent time splitting between the Lakeland Flying Tigers and Erie SeaWolves where he hit .278 with 15 home runs and 70 RBIs over the course of 123 games with the two teams. After the 2018 season, he played for Yaquis of the LMP.

Paredes began the 2019 season with Erie and was named to the 2019 All-Star Futures Game. He was selected to play in the Arizona Fall League for the Mesa Solar Sox following the season. He finished the season with 13 home runs, 66 RBIs, a .282 average, and 57 walks to 61 strikeouts with an OBP of .368. Paredes was added to the Tigers 40–man roster following the 2019 season. After the 2019 season, he played for Yaquis of the LMP.

On August 17, 2020, the Tigers recalled Paredes, and he made his MLB debut later that day against the Chicago White Sox playing third base. In his second at-bat of his career, Paredes hit a bases-loaded, two-RBI single off Gio Gonzalez for his first major league hit. On August 21 against the Cleveland Indians, Paredes hit a grand slam for his first major league home run. He is the first Tiger player to hit a grand slam for his first major league homer since Brennan Boesch in 2010, and the youngest Tiger to hit a grand slam since Al Kaline in 1954. In 34 games during the 2020 season, Paredes hit .220 with one home run and six RBIs. After the 2020 season, he played for Venados de Mazatlán of the LMP, where he hit .379 in 42 games. He has also played for Mexico in the 2021 Caribbean Series.

Paredes did not earn a spot on the Tigers' major league roster to start the 2021 season. He was recalled from Triple-A Toledo Mud Hens on June 8 and was in the lineup that evening. Paredes went on the 10-day injured list on July 22 with a sore hip.

=== Tampa Bay Rays (2022–2024) ===
On April 4, 2022, the Tigers traded Paredes and a competitive balance round B pick in the 2022 MLB draft to the Tampa Bay Rays in exchange for Austin Meadows. After playing for the Triple–A Durham Bulls, he made his debut with the Rays on May 1 against the Minnesota Twins. On May 18, Paredes had his first career multi-homer game against the Tigers at Tropicana Field. On June 21, he homered three times against the New York Yankees in a 5–4 Rays victory. In 111 games in 2022, he batted .205/.304/.435 with 20 home runs and 45 RBI.

In 2023, Paredes was the Opening Day starter at third base. On May 7, 2023, he hit a walk-off single in the 10th inning against the Yankees. Paredes played in 143 games for the Rays, hitting .250/.352/.488 with 31 home runs and 98 RBI. In 101 appearances for the Rays in 2024, Paredes slashed .245/.357/.435 with 16 home runs and 55 RBI.

=== Chicago Cubs (2024) ===
On July 28, 2024, the Rays traded Paredes to the Chicago Cubs in exchange for Christopher Morel, Hunter Bigge, and Ty Johnson. In 52 appearances for Chicago, Paredes slashed .223/.325/.307 with three home runs and 25 RBI.

=== Houston Astros (2025–present) ===
On December 13, 2024, the Cubs traded Paredes, along with Hayden Wesneski and Cam Smith, to the Houston Astros in exchange for Kyle Tucker. On January 9, 2025, the Astros signed Paredes to a $6.625 million contract for the season, avoiding arbitration. Paredes connected for his first home run in an Astros uniform on April 11, 2025, off Ian Anderson of the Los Angeles Angels; he also reached base in each of his last five plate appearances in a 14–3 win. On May 13, Paredes hit his first career walk-off home run to secure a 2–1 win over the Kansas City Royals. On July 9, it was announced that Paredes will be at the 2025 Major League Baseball All-Star Game as a replacement for José Ramírez due to Ramírez electing not to play. In 94 appearances for Houston on the year, he slashed .259/.359/.470 with 19 home runs and 50 RBI. On July 19, Paredes departed a game against the Seattle Mariners with a right hamstring strain; he was placed on the injured list the following day. On July 23, manager Joe Espada announced that Paredes had suffered a "pretty significant" strain, and would miss a lengthy amount of time; he was transferred to the 60-day injured list on August 6. Paredes was activated on September 19.

On May 31, 2026, Paredes doubled versus the Milwaukee Brewers to log his 500th career hit, becoming the 10th Mexican-born player to reach the milestone. On June 4, he connected for the 100th home run of his career, which he hit off Carmen Mlodzinski of the Pittsburgh Pirates. The following day, Paredes homered for a third consecutive game For the 2026 season, Paredes established a number of career-highs, including in games played (155), plate appearances (659), runs (69), hits (147), and doubles (27). He hit 25 home runs, 94 RBI, and slashed .262/.360/.447/.806. (Note: Listed combination of batting statistics including batting average (AVG), on-base percentage (OBP), slugging percentage (SLG), and on-base plus slugging percentage (OPS).) Paredes ranked sixth in the AL in RBI, fifth in hit by pitch (19), and ninth in at bats per strikeout (6.4). On defense, he led AL third basemen in putouts (109) in 135 games, and ranked second in double plays turned (25) and fielding percentage (.969), and fifth in assists (174). He also made 15 appearances at first base and three at second base. In the two-game Wild Card Series, Paredes was 1-for-6 with a walk and hit by pitch. However, the Chicago White Sox swept the Astros to eliminate them from the playoffs.

== International career ==
Paredes represented Mexico in the 2014 15U Baseball World Cup. He tied for the tournament lead with 14 RBI despite Mexico finishing in fifth place.

Paredes was selected to the Mexico national team for the 2023 World Baseball Classic. In the tournament, he batted .375/.444/.500. His six RBIs over the course of the tournament were tied with Joey Meneses for second on the Mexico lineup, behind only Rays teammate Randy Arozarena. In the quarterfinal game against Puerto Rico, Paredes hit a solo home run off of Marcus Stroman to put Mexico on the board after a four run Puerto Rico 1st inning, and later plated the tying runs off an RBI single in the 7th inning; Mexico went on to win 5–4. In the semifinal against Japan, he went 3-for-4, scoring on a Luis Urías home run and hitting another RBI single off Atsuki Yuasa. However, Mexico went on to lose the game 6–5. Despite being eliminated from the tournament, Mexico's performance in 2023 was its best ever in a WBC.
