= Travis Sykora =

American baseball player (born 2004)

Washington Nationals
- Pitcher
- Born: April 28, 2004 (age 22); Round Rock, Texas, U.S.
- Bats: Right Throws: Right
- Stats at Baseball Reference

Travis Alvin Sykora (born April 28, 2004) is an American professional baseball pitcher for the Washington Nationals of Major League Baseball (MLB).

== Career ==
Sykora attended Round Rock High School in Round Rock, Texas. He was selected by the Washington Nationals in the third round of the 2023 Major League Baseball draft.

Sykora signed with the Nationals rather than play college baseball at the University of Texas at Austin. He made his professional debut in 2024 with the Fredericksburg Nationals.

Sykora started the 2025 season on the injured list after offseason hip surgery. He made two starts each for the rookie-level Florida Complex League Nationals and Single-A Fredericksburg before being promoted to the High-A Wilmington Blue Rocks. In June, Sykora was promoted again to the Double-A Harrisburg Senators. On July 28, it was announced that Sykora would miss the remainder of the year and likely all of the 2026 season after undergoing Tommy John surgery.

The Nationals selected Sykora's contract on November 17, 2026, adding him to the 40-man roster.
