= Alexa Datt =

American sportscaster and journalist

- Born: November 22, 1985 (age 40); Derwood, Maryland, U.S.
- Sports commentary career
- Team: Washington Nationals
- Genres: Sideline reporter and host
- Sports: Baseball and ice hockey

Alexa Datt (born November 22, 1985) is an American sports broadcaster and journalist. She is the current studio host and reporter for the Washington Nationals of Major League Baseball (MLB) on Nationals.TV. Datt has also served as a studio host and reporter on MLB Network and NHL Network, as well as at Bally Sports Midwest and FanDuel Sports Network Midwest, covering MLB's St. Louis Cardinals and the National Hockey League's St. Louis Blues, and at SNY covering the New York Mets.

== Early life and education ==
Datt grew up in Derwood, Maryland, and attended Col. Zadok Magruder High School in nearby Rockville. She was the sports editor for her high school newspaper.

Datt majored in broadcast journalism at the University of Maryland, with a minor in Spanish. She graduated with a bachelor's degree in 2007.

== Career ==
While still attending the University of Maryland, Datt was an intern at Comcast SportsNet. The internship gave her experience covering all of Washington, D.C.'s major sports teams.

After earning her degree, Datt worked at SNY in New York City for seven years as a producer and eventual studio host covering the New York Mets. She was hired by MLB.com to host a digital baseball show, going on to appear as a host on MLB Network, as well as NHL Network. During her time with MLB Network, Datt narrated a network special on the 2019 championship season of the Washington Nationals, her hometown team.

Ahead of the 2022 MLB season, Datt departed the national networks for a job in St. Louis as a studio host and reporter for Bally Sports Midwest, covering the St. Louis Cardinals and St. Louis Blues, as well as Saint Louis University athletics. After Bally Sports Midwest became FanDuel Sports Network Midwest in 2024, Datt remained with the rebranded network. She provided play-by-play commentary during two televised spring training games in 2025, becoming the first woman ever to call Cardinals play-by-play on the air.

Before the start of the 2026 MLB season, Datt was hired by the Nationals to serve as studio host and reporter for their new broadcast platform, Nationals.TV.
