= Hunter Bigge =

American baseball player (born 1998)

Athletics
- Pitcher
- Born: June 12, 1998 (age 28); Los Gatos, California, U.S.
- Bats: Right Throws: Right

MLB debut
- July 9, 2024, for the Chicago Cubs

MLB statistics (through 2026 season)
- Win–loss record: 1–1
- Earned run average: 4.18
- Strikeouts: 50
- Stats at Baseball Reference

Teams
- Chicago Cubs (2024); Tampa Bay Rays (2024–2026)

Hunter Bradford Bigge (/ˈbɪɡiː/ BIG-ee; born June 12, 1998) is an American professional baseball pitcher for the Athletics of Major League Baseball (MLB). He has previously played in MLB for the Chicago Cubs and Tampa Bay Rays. He made his MLB debut in 2024 with the Cubs.

== Career ==
=== Amateur career ===
Bigge attended Los Gatos High School in Los Gatos, California, and Harvard University, where he played college baseball for the Harvard Crimson. Bigge played collegiate summer baseball with the Duluth Huskies in the Northwoods League, where his fastball reached 95 miles per hour (153 km/h).

=== Chicago Cubs ===
The Chicago Cubs selected Bigge in the 12th round, with the 372nd overall pick, of the 2019 Major League Baseball draft. He signed with the Cubs rather than start an internship with BlackRock. In his first professional season, Bigge logged a 1.13 ERA with 22 strikeouts in 9 games for the rookie–level Arizona League Cubs and Low–A Eugene Emeralds. Bigge worked for a financial startup after the minor league season was cancelled as a result of the COVID-19 pandemic shutdown.

In 2021, Bigge made 17 appearances for the High–A South Bend Cubs, logging a 5.66 ERA with 29 strikeouts over 20 2/3 innings pitched. He missed playing time during the season as the result of a torn labrum. Bigge split the 2022 campaign between South Bend and the Double–A Tennessee Smokies, accumulating a 7–2 record and 5.26 ERA with 70 strikeouts and 10 saves in 41 games. In 2023, he played for Tennessee and the Triple–A Iowa Cubs, compiling a 4.50 ERA with 68 strikeouts across 42 appearances out of the bullpen.

Bigge began the 2024 campaign with Triple–A Iowa. On July 7, 2024, the Cubs selected Bigge to the 40-man roster and promoted him to the major leagues for the first time. He made his MLB debut on July 9, and recorded a 2.70 ERA with 5 strikeouts in 4 games.

=== Tampa Bay Rays ===
On July 28, 2024, the Cubs traded Bigge, Christopher Morel, and Ty Johnson to the Tampa Bay Rays in exchange for Isaac Paredes. In 15 appearances down the stretch, he compiled a 2.57 ERA with 19 strikeouts and one save across 14 innings pitched.

Bigge was initially optioned to the Triple-A Durham Bulls to begin the 2025 season. However, following an injury to Shane McClanahan, the Rays added Bigge to their Opening Day roster. In 13 appearances for the Rays, he recorded a 2.40 ERA with 12 strikeouts over 15 innings of work. On June 19, 2025, Bigge was hit in the face by a 105-mile-per-hour (169 km/h) line drive foul ball off the bat of Baltimore Orioles catcher Adley Rutschman. He did not lose consciousness, but was carted off the field to receive medical attention. Bigge required emergency surgery to repair multiple facial fractures.

Bigge was optioned to Triple-A Durham to begin the 2026 season. On May 7, 2026, Bigge recorded his first career win after tossing two scoreless innings of relief against the Boston Red Sox. He made 18 appearances for Tampa Bay, struggling to a 6.98 ERA with 14 strikeouts across 19 1/3 innings pitched. On September 8, Bigge was designated for assignment by the Rays.

=== Athletics ===
On September 11, 2026, Bigge was claimed off of waivers by the Athletics.
