= Christopher Morel =

Dominican baseball player (born 1999)

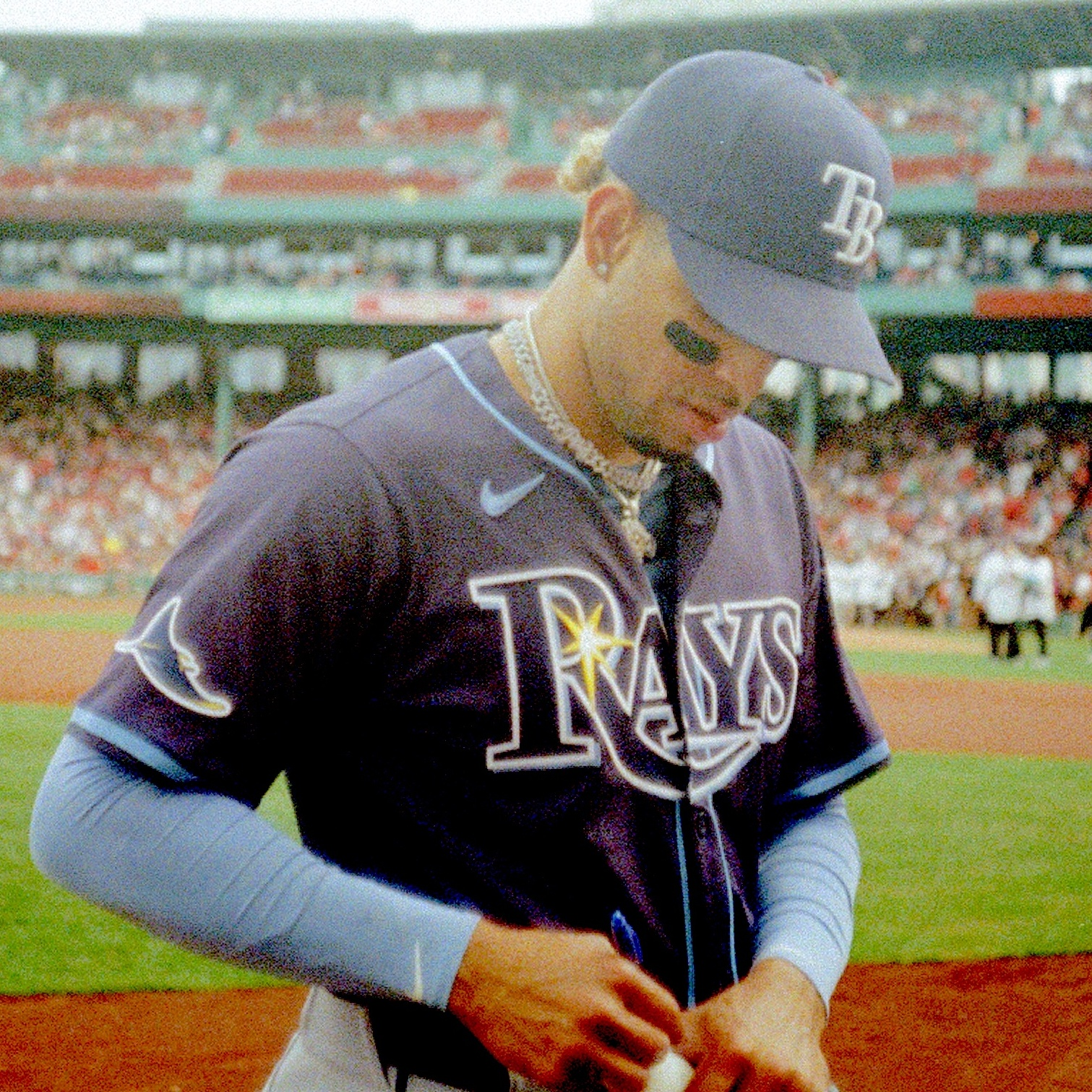
- Morel with the Rays in 2024

Free agent
- Utility player
- Born: June 24, 1999 (age 27); Santiago, Dominican Republic
- Bats: Right Throws: Right

MLB debut
- May 17, 2022, for the Chicago Cubs

MLB statistics (through 2026 season)
- Batting average: .219
- Home runs: 75
- Runs batted in: 216
- Stats at Baseball Reference

Teams
- Chicago Cubs (2022–2024); Tampa Bay Rays (2024–2025); Miami Marlins (2026); New York Mets (2026)

Christopher Rafael Morel (born June 24, 1999) is a Dominican professional baseball utility player who is a free agent. He has previously played in Major League Baseball (MLB) for the Chicago Cubs, Tampa Bay Rays, Miami Marlins, and New York Mets. Morel signed with the Cubs as an international free agent in 2015, and made his MLB debut with them in 2022.

== Professional career ==
=== Chicago Cubs ===
==== Minor leagues ====
Morel signed with the Chicago Cubs as an international free agent on August 23, 2015. In 2017, he was assigned to the Cubs team of the Dominican Summer League. In 61 games, he slashed .220/.332/.359 with seven home runs, 40 runs batted in (RBI), 44 runs scored, and 23 stolen bases. He spent the 2018 season with Low–A Eugene Emeralds, and Rookie League AZL Cubs. In 54 games, he batted .216 with 44 hits, eight doubles and three home runs. He spent the 2019 season with the Single-A South Bend Cubs. In 73 games, he batted .284, with 73 hits, 15 doubles, seven triples, and six home runs.

He did not play in a game in 2020 due to the cancellation of the minor league season because of the COVID-19 pandemic. The Cubs added Morel to their 40-man roster to protect him from the Rule 5 draft on November 20, 2020. He spent the 2021 season with the Double-A Tennessee Smokies, and Triple-A Iowa Cubs. In 111 games, he batted .223 with 90 hits, 18 doubles, 5 triples, and a career-high 18 home runs.

==== Major leagues ====
Morel started the 2022 season with Double-A Tennessee but was recalled to the major leagues on May 17. Morel made his major league debut later that day, and hit a home run in his first career at-bat during a 7–0 win over the Pittsburgh Pirates. Morel appeared in 113 games for the Cubs in his rookie campaign, slashing .235/.308/.433 with 16 home runs, 47 runs batted in (RBI), and 10 stolen bases.

The Cubs optioned Morel to Triple-A Iowa to begin the 2023 season. They promoted him to the major leagues on May 8, 2023, after he batted .330/.425/.730 with 11 home runs and 31 RBIs over 29 games. Upon his promotion, Morel became the first Cub in franchise history to record nine home runs in his first 12 games of a season on May 23, 2023. In 107 games for the Cubs, he slashed .247/.313/.508 with 26 home runs and 70 RBI.

Morel made 103 appearances for Chicago in 2024, hitting .199/.302/.373 with 18 home runs, 57 RBI, and 7 stolen bases.

=== Tampa Bay Rays ===
On July 28, 2024, the Cubs traded Morel, Hunter Bigge, and Ty Johnson to the Tampa Bay Rays in exchange for Isaac Paredes. In 49 games for Tampa Bay in 2024, Morel batted .191/.258/.289 with three home runs and nine RBI. His combined batting average of .196 was the worst in the major leagues.

Morel made 105 appearances for Tampa Bay during the 2025 season, slashing .219/.289/.396 with 11 home runs, 33 RBI, and seven stolen bases. He was designated for assignment by the Rays on November 18, 2025. On November 21, Morel was non-tendered by Tampa Bay and became a free agent.

=== Miami Marlins ===
On December 18, 2025, Morel signed a one-year, $2 million contract with the Miami Marlins. Prior to Miami's Opening Day matchup against the Colorado Rockies, Morel was scratched from the lineup due to an oblique injury. On March 28, 2026, he was ruled out for 4-to-6 weeks due to an oblique strain. Upon returning from injury, Morel played in 22 games for Miami, slashing .162/.219/.206 with one RBI and one stolen base. He was designated for assignment by the Marlins on June 21, following Griffin Conine's return from injury. He cleared waivers and was sent outright to the Triple-A Jacksonville Jumbo Shrimp on June 25. Morel was released by Miami the following day.

=== New York Mets ===
On July 1, 2026, Morel signed a minor league contract with the New York Mets. He made 31 appearances for the Triple–A Syracuse Mets, slashing .321/.382/.716 with 12 home runs and 29 RBI. On August 17, the Mets selected Morel's contract, adding him to their active roster. On November 20, Morel was non-tendered by the Mets and became a free agent.

== Personal life ==
Morel's brother, Rafael, played with the Cubs organization from 2019 through 2025.

== See also ==
- List of Major League Baseball players with a home run in their first major league at bat
- List of Major League Baseball players from the Dominican Republic
