= Matt Tracy =

American baseball pitcher and coach (born 1988)

Cincinnati Reds – No. 90
- Pitcher / Coach
- Born: November 26, 1988 (age 37); St. Louis, Missouri, U.S.
- Batted: Left Threw: Left

MLB debut
- April 11, 2015, for the New York Yankees

Last MLB appearance
- April 11, 2015, for the New York Yankees

MLB statistics
- Win–loss record: 0–0
- Earned run average: 0.00
- Strikeouts: 1
- Stats at Baseball Reference

Teams
- As player: New York Yankees (2015); As coach: Cincinnati Reds (2023–present)

Matthew John Tracy (born November 26, 1988) is an American former professional baseball pitcher and current coach who serves as the assistant pitching coach for the Cincinnati Reds. He played in Major League Baseball (MLB) for the New York Yankees in 2015.

== Playing career ==
=== New York Yankees ===
Tracy played college baseball at the University of Mississippi for the Ole Miss Rebels from 2008 to 2011. After his junior year, he was drafted by the Florida Marlins in the 43rd round of the 2010 Major League Baseball draft, but did not sign and returned to Ole Miss for his senior season.

Tracy was then drafted by the New York Yankees in the 24th round of the 2011 Major League Baseball draft. He signed with the Yankees and made his professional debut that season with the Staten Island Yankees. Tracy pitched 2012 with the Tampa Yankees of the High–A Florida State League and also made one start with the Scranton/Wilkes-Barre Yankees of the Triple–A International League. He pitched 2013 with the Trenton Thunder of the Double–A Eastern League. Tracy started 2014 back with Trenton and was promoted to the RailRiders in July.

The Yankees promoted Tracy to the major leagues on April 11, 2015, and he pitched two innings against the Boston Red Sox, yielding three unearned runs. Tracy recorded a strikeout of David Ortiz in his appearance. Tracy was designated for assignment the next day, and claimed off of waivers by the Marlins on April 18. The Marlins assigned Tracy to the New Orleans Zephyrs of the International League. He was then designated for assignment by the Marlins on April 21 and claimed by the Yankees the next day. The Yankees outrighted him off of the 40-man roster after he cleared waivers on June 4.

=== Miami Marlins ===
On June 19, 2016, Tracy signed a minor league contract with the Miami Marlins organization. He made 12 appearances (11 starts) for the Double–A Jacksonville Suns, as well as one appearance for the High–A Jupiter Hammerheads, compiling a 2–5 record and 4.61 ERA with 38 strikeouts across 54 2/3 innings pitched. Tracy elected free agency following the season on November 7.

=== Minnesota Twins ===
On January 6, 2017, Tracy signed a minor league contract with the Minnesota Twins. He split the season between the rookie–level Gulf Coast League Twins, Double–A Chattanooga Lookouts, and Triple–A Rochester Red Wings. In 18 appearances (13 starts), Tracy accumulated a 5–6 record and 4.71 ERA with 74 strikeouts across 84 innings pitched. He elected free agency following the season on November 6.

=== Toronto Blue Jays ===
On February 25, 2018, Tracy signed a minor league contract with the Toronto Blue Jays. He made 14 appearances (12 starts) for the Triple–A Buffalo Bisons and rookie–level Gulf Coast League Blue Jays, accumulating a 2.48 ERA with 37 strikeouts across 54 1/3 innings of work. Tracy elected free agency following the season on November 2.

== Coaching career ==
In January 2020, Tracy joined the Toronto Blue Jays organization as a pitching coach for the Rookie-level Gulf Coast League Blue Jays.

On November 29, 2022, the Cincinnati Reds hired Tracy to serve as their bullpen coach for the 2023 season, replacing Lee Tunnell. On November 13, 2025, it was announced that Tracy would shift to the role of assistant pitching coach. In June 2026, he was given the role of interim pitching coach after it was announced that pitching coach Derek Johnson would take an indefinite leave of absence from the team.
