= Michael Johns (baseball) =

American baseball player and coach (born 1975)

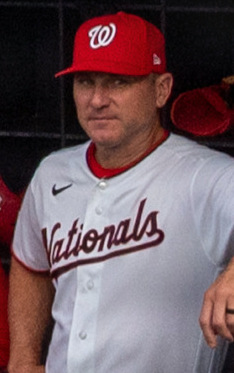
- Johns in 2026

Washington Nationals – No. 9
- Infielder / Bench coach
- Born: August 26, 1975 (age 51); Fernandina Beach, Florida, U.S.
- Bats: Right Throws: Right
- Stats at Baseball Reference

Teams
- As coach: Tampa Bay Rays (2024–2025); Washington Nationals (2026–present)

Michael J. Johns (born August 26, 1975) is an American professional baseball coach for the Washington Nationals of Major League Baseball (MLB). He formerly coached in MLB for the Tampa Bay Rays.

== Baseball career ==
=== As a player ===
An infielder out of Tulane University, Johns was selected in the 19th round of the 1997 Major League Baseball draft by the Colorado Rockies. He made his professional debut in 1997 with the Portland Rockies, then played for the Asheville Tourists in 1998. He was released by the Rockies but appeared in 41 games for the independent Allentown Ambassadors in 1999 before retiring from professional baseball. He hit .214 with five home runs across his two minor league seasons.

=== As a coach ===
After several years of coaching at the high school level, Johns returned to professional baseball as bench coach for the Hudson Valley Renegades, a Class-A minor league affiliate of the Tampa Bay Rays, in 2008. He was promoted to manager of the Rookie-level Princeton Rays in 2010, managing them for three seasons. He went on to manage Hudson Valley in 2013, the Class-A Bowling Green Hot Rods in 2014, and the Class-A Advanced Charlotte Stone Crabs from 2015 to 2017. He served as field coordinator for the entire Rays minor league system from 2018 to 2022 before being named manager of the Class-AAA Durham Bulls for the 2023 season.

After more than 15 years working in player development, Johns was promoted to the Rays' major league coaching staff for the first time ahead of the 2024 season. Johns spent two years as first base coach for Tampa Bay before he was hired by the Washington Nationals as bench coach to first-year manager Blake Butera, ahead of the 2026 season. He was the first member of Butera's coaching staff to be officially named by the Nationals.

Johns has also worked as a coach in the Australian Baseball League. He was hitting coach for the Canberra Cavalry in 2011–12 and first base coach for the Brisbane Bandits in 2015–16.
