= Keith Beauregard =

American baseball coach (born 1983)

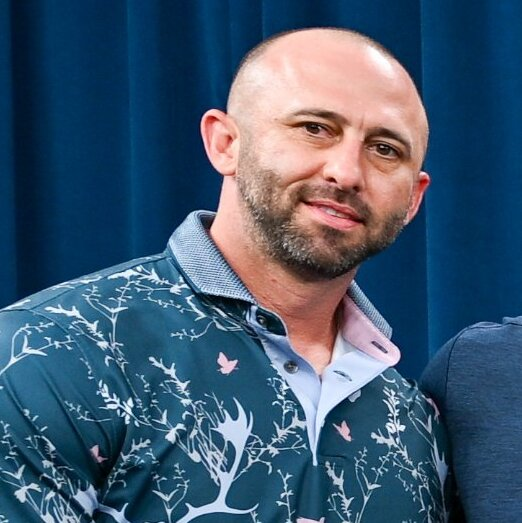
- Beauregard at the Pentagon in 2025

Minnesota Twins – No. 84
- Coach
- Born: May 15, 1983 (age 42); Leominster, Massachusetts, U.S.
- Bats: Left Throws: Left
- Stats at Baseball Reference

Teams
- As coach: Detroit Tigers (2023–2025); Minnesota Twins (2026–present)

Keith Beauregard (born May 15, 1983) is an American professional baseball hitting coach for the Minnesota Twins of Major League Baseball (MLB). He has previously served as the hitting coach for the Detroit Tigers of MLB.

== Career ==
Beauregard graduated from Leominster High School in Leominster, Massachusetts, in 2001. He enrolled at Saint Anselm College, where he played college baseball for the Saint Anselm Hawks. He was named All-Northeast-10 Conference in all four years at Saint Anselm. After graduating, Beauregard played baseball in a semi-professional league before playing professional baseball for three years with the Worcester Tornadoes in the Canadian American Association of Professional Baseball, an independent baseball league, from 2005 to 2007. After he retired, he worked in real estate.

Beauregard was an assistant coach at the University of Massachusetts, Lowell for two years. While there, he also served as the bench coach for the Pittsfield Colonials of the Cam-Am League in 2011. He was an assistant coach at Santa Clara University for five years. He became a minor league hitting instructor for the Los Angeles Dodgers before becoming their assistant minor league field coordinator.

=== Detroit Tigers ===
On November 16, 2022, the Detroit Tigers hired Beauregard as a major league hitting coach. On October 29, 2025, it was announced that Beauregard would not return to Detroit for the 2026 season.

=== Minnesota Twins ===
On November 14, 2025, the Minnesota Twins hired Beauregard to serve as the team's hitting coach.

== Personal life ==
Beauregard and his wife, Monica, have two daughters. They live in Buckeye, Arizona.
