= Andrew Aydt =

American baseball coach

Washington Nationals – No. 60
- Hitting coach
- Born: 1994 or 1995 (age 30–31); Wildwood, Missouri, U.S.

Teams
- As coach: Washington Nationals (2026–present)

Andrew J. Aydt is an American professional baseball coach for the Washington Nationals of Major League Baseball (MLB). He previously worked for Driveline Baseball, a Seattle baseball development facility, from 2018 to 2025. He attended and played baseball at McKendree University in Lebanon, Illinois, earning a Master of Business Administration and a bachelor's degree in economics and finance.

The Nationals hired Aydt as an assistant hitting coach ahead of the 2026 Major League Baseball season, making him one of the youngest coaches in MLB.
