= Paxton Schultz =

American baseball player (born 1998)

Cincinnati Reds
- Pitcher
- Born: January 5, 1998 (age 28); Orem, Utah, U.S.
- Bats: Right Throws: Right

MLB debut
- April 20, 2025, for the Toronto Blue Jays

MLB statistics (through 2026 season)
- Win–loss record: 1–2
- Earned run average: 5.53
- Strikeouts: 60
- Stats at Baseball Reference

Teams
- Toronto Blue Jays (2025); Washington Nationals (2026)

Paxton James Schultz (born January 5, 1998) is an American professional baseball pitcher for the Cincinnati Reds of Major League Baseball (MLB). He has previously played in MLB for the Toronto Blue Jays and Washington Nationals.

== Career ==
=== Amateur ===
Schultz attended Orem High School in Orem, Utah, and Utah Valley University, where he played college baseball for the Utah Valley Wolverines. He graduated magna cum laude with a bachelor's degree in finance.

=== Milwaukee Brewers ===
The Milwaukee Brewers selected him in the 14th round, with the 443rd overall pick, of the 2019 Major League Baseball draft. He made his professional debut with the rookie-level Rocky Mountain Vibes, logging a 1-3 record and 3.86 ERA with 22 strikeouts in 23 1/3 innings pitched across nine games. Schultz did not play in a game in 2020 due to the cancellation of the minor league season because of the COVID-19 pandemic.

=== Toronto Blue Jays ===
On May 1, 2021, the Brewers sent Schultz to the Toronto Blue Jays as the player to be named later in their previous trade for Derek Fisher.

On April 20, 2025, Schultz was selected to the 40-man roster and promoted to the major leagues for the first time. He made his debut later that day against the Seattle Mariners, pitching 4 1/3 innings and recording eight strikeouts, tying the MLB record for the most strikeouts by a relief pitcher in their major league debut. After being optioned twice to Buffalo in August, Schultz was recalled to the Blue Jays on September 25. In 13 total appearances for the Blue Jays during his rookie campaign, he recorded a 4.38 ERA with 28 strikeouts across 24 2/3 innings pitched. On January 4, 2026, Schultz was designated for assignment by Toronto following the signing of Kazuma Okamoto.

=== Washington Nationals ===
On January 9, 2026, Schultz was claimed off waivers by the Washington Nationals. Ahead of the regular season on March 23, Schultz was placed on the injured list due to right elbow inflammation. On June 16, Schultz recorded his first career win, tossing a scoreless inning of relief against the Kansas City Royals. He made 27 appearances (including one start) for the Nationals, posting a 1–2 record and 6.40 ERA with 32 strikeouts and one save across 32 1/3 innings pitched.

=== Cincinnati Reds ===
On November 2, 2026, Schultz was claimed off of waivers by the Cincinnati Reds.
