= Chase Hampton (baseball) =

American baseball player (born 2001)

New York Yankees
- Pitcher
- Born: August 7, 2001 (age 25); Longview, Texas, U.S.
- Bats: Right Throws: Right
- Stats at Baseball Reference

Aubrey Chase Hampton (born August 7, 2001) is an American professional baseball pitcher for the New York Yankees of Major League Baseball (MLB). He played college baseball at Texas Tech University before being selected by the Yankees in the 2022 MLB draft.

== Early life and amateur career ==
Hampton was born on August 7, 2001, in Longview, Texas, and grew up in Kilgore, Texas, where he attended Kilgore High School. He played tee-ball in his youth and baseball in high school. During his high school career, he was 22–5 with a 1.94 earned run average (ERA) and 284 strikeouts. After high school, Hampton went on to play college baseball at Texas Tech University. As a freshman in 2021, he pitched primarily in relief before transitioning to a starting role. During his collegiate career, he posted a combined 5–4 record with a 4.29 ERA and 110 strikeouts over 84 innings. In the summer of 2021, he played for the Chatham Anglers of the Cape Cod Baseball League.

== Professional career ==
=== New York Yankees ===
==== 2022 ====
The New York Yankees selected Hampton in the sixth round, with the 190th overall selection, of the 2022 Major League Baseball draft. He signed with the team on July 26, 2022, and received a signing bonus of $250,000.

==== 2023 ====
Hampton made his professional debut with the Hudson Valley Renegades, the Yankees' High-A affiliate. Across 20 starts for the Renegades, he recorded a 3.63 ERA and 124 strikeouts in 89 1/3 innings pitched. Hampton continued to rise through the Yankees' minor league system, earning recognition as a standout pitching prospect. Analysts highlighted his impressive strikeout rates, strong command, and ability to generate swing-and-miss stuff, making him a well-rounded pitching arsenal, with some scouts considering him a "hidden gem" within the Yankees’ farm system. Hampton made his Double-A debut in June with the Somerset Patriots.

==== 2024 ====
Hampton made a strong return during the 2024 season. However, in March 2024, Hampton was placed on the 60-day injured list due to arm fatigue. Yankees GM Brian Cashman reaffirmed the organization’s belief in Hampton’s potential, emphasizing their "patience with top-tier pitching talent". After the injury setbacks, posting a 2.41 ERA over 18 2/3 innings. In 2024, he was invited to the Yankees' spring training as a non-roster invitee. He was described as a top pitching prospect for the Yankees.

Building on his strong rookie season, showcasing elite velocity, a sharp breaking ball, and an improved changeup, analysts projected an accelerated timeline for his promotion, with many expecting him to reach Triple–A in 2024 and make his MLB debut in 2025.

==== 2025 ====
Hampton underwent Tommy John surgery for an injury to his right elbow in February 2025, causing him to miss the entirety of the season. On November 18, 2025, the Yankees added Hampton to their 40-man roster to protect him from the Rule 5 draft.

==== 2026 ====
Hampton was optioned to Double-A Somerset to begin the 2026 season. After struggling to begin the season in the minors after further injuries, he was designated for assignment on September 7, 2026 to clear roster space for Aaron Judge.

On September 12, 2026, Hampton was claimed off of waivers by the Washington Nationals. He did not appear for the organization prior to the conclusion of the regular season. Hampton was claimed off of waivers by the St. Louis Cardinals on September 28 and the Baltimore Orioles on November 2. On November 17, Hampton was claimed back off waivers by the New York Yankees.

== Personal life ==
Hampton is the son of Heather and Trent Logston and has three brothers. He majored in University Studies at Texas Tech.
