= Grant Anders =

American baseball coach (born 1996)

Washington Nationals – No. 83
- Development coach
- Born: September 3, 1996 (age 30); Wytheville, Virginia, U.S.

Teams
- As coach: Baltimore Orioles (2024–2025); Washington Nationals (2026–present)

Grant Anders (born September 3, 1996) is an American professional baseball coach for the Washington Nationals of Major League Baseball (MLB). He has also coached in MLB for the Baltimore Orioles.

== Career ==
A native of Wytheville, Virginia, Anders interned with the New York Yankees and Kansas City Royals while attending Radford University in Radford, Virginia. He did not play on the Radford baseball team but served as its director of baseball operations from 2015 to 2018.

After graduating, Anders worked for the Cincinnati Reds and the Baltimore Orioles, becoming a development coach for the Orioles' Double-A affiliate, the Bowie BaySox, in 2019. After several years working in player development with the Orioles, Anders was named to a major league coaching staff for the first time ahead of the 2024 season, serving as major league development coach under manager Brandon Hyde. He left the Orioles after the 2025 season and was hired by Washington Nationals manager Blake Butera as a major league development coach for the 2026 season on November 29, 2025.

Anders holds a bachelor's degree from Radford and a master's degree in sports law and business from Arizona State University.
