= Riley Cornelio =

American baseball player (born 2000)

Washington Nationals – No. 74
- Pitcher
- Born: June 6, 2000 (age 26); Honolulu, Hawaii, U.S.
- Bats: Right Throws: Right

MLB debut
- April 24, 2026, for the Washington Nationals

MLB statistics (through 2026 season)
- Win–loss record: 3–2
- Earned run average: 3.68
- Strikeouts: 40
- Stats at Baseball Reference

Teams
- Washington Nationals (2026–present)

Riley John Thomas Cornelio (born June 6, 2000) is an American professional baseball pitcher for the Washington Nationals of Major League Baseball (MLB). He made his MLB debut in 2026.

== Early life ==
Cornelio attended Pine Creek High School in Colorado Springs, Colorado, where he played baseball. In 2018, he played for the United States national under-18 baseball team at the COPABE U-18 Pan-American Championships. In 2019, as a senior, he went 7–2 with a 2.43 ERA and 89 strikeouts over 49 innings, and was named the Colorado Gatorade Baseball Player of the Year. Cornelio went unselected in the 2019 Major League Baseball draft and enrolled at Texas Christian University where he played college baseball for the Horned Frogs. In 2021, he played collegiate summer baseball in the Northwoods League with the St. Cloud Rox, and set a Rox single-game record with 14 strikeouts. As a redshirt sophomore for the Horned Frogs in 2022, he was the team's number one starter, starting 15 games and going 4–5 with a 4.68 ERA and 77 strikeouts over 75 innings.

== Professional career ==
Cornelio was selected by the Washington Nationals in the seventh round of the 2022 Major League Baseball draft. After signing, Cornelio made his professional debut in 2023 with the Fredericksburg Nationals, making 22 starts and going 4–8 with a 4.68 ERA. He pitched the 2024 season with the Wilmington Blue Rocks and went 9–11 with a 5.56 ERA over 26 starts. For the 2025 season, Cornelio played with Wilmington, the Harrisburg Senators, and the Rochester Red Wings, making 26 starts and going 6–7 with a 3.28 ERA and 135 strikeouts over 134 1/3 innings. The Nationals named Cornelio their Minor League Pitcher of the Year. On November 18, the Nationals added Cornelio to their 40-man roster to protect him from the Rule 5 draft.

Cornelio was optioned to Triple-A Rochester to begin the 2026 season. After posting a 2.45 ERA over four starts, Cornelio was promoted to the major leagues for the first time on April 24, 2026. He made his MLB debut that evening in relief at Rate Field against the Chicago White Sox, giving up three runs and taking the loss. Cornelio was optioned back to Rochester after the game. He was recalled three more times by the Nationals; twice in June, and once in September. He made a total of 18 appearances (three starts) for Washington and ended the season with a 3–2 record, a 3.68 ERA, and 40 strikeouts across 36 1/3 innings.
