= Simon Mathews (baseball) =

American baseball player and coach (born 1995)

Washington Nationals – No. 53
- Pitcher / Pitching coach
- Born: September 24, 1995 (age 31); West Haven, Connecticut, U.S.
- Bats: Right Throws: Right

Teams
- As coach: Cincinnati Reds (2025); Washington Nationals (2026–present)

Simon Ambrose Mathews (born September 24, 1995) is an American professional baseball coach for the Washington Nationals of Major League Baseball (MLB). He has previously coached in MLB for the Cincinnati Reds.

== Baseball career ==
=== Pitcher ===
As a freshman, Mathews pitched at Temple University in 2014 before transferring to Georgetown University for the remainder of his college career. He signed with the Los Angeles Angels as an undrafted free agent, making his professional debut in 2017 and reaching Class-AAA with the Salt Lake Bees for the first time the following season. He pitched to a 4.51 ERA over three seasons before he was released during the 2020 Major League Baseball season, after the COVID-19 pandemic prompted the cancellation of all minor league games that year.

=== Coach ===
Mathews worked for Driveline Baseball and Push Performance after he was released, where he met Sean Doolittle, then a relief pitcher for the defending world champion Washington Nationals. He returned to professional baseball as an instructor when the Cincinnati Reds hired him to run their pitching development program in the Dominican Republic. After several years as a minor league instructor in the Reds organization, at age 29, Mathews was named as Cincinnati's assistant pitching coach for the 2025 season.

Following the 2025 season, Mathews accepted a position as pitching coach on the staff of first-year manager Blake Butera, reuniting with Doolittle—now an assistant pitching coach himself—on the Nationals.

== Personal life ==
Mathews grew up in West Haven, Connecticut. His family temporarily relocated to Barcelona for a teaching opportunity when he was in the fifth grade, where Mathews learned Spanish. After moving back to Connecticut, Mathews attended Hopkins School and played on the varsity baseball and soccer teams. He graduated from Georgetown in 2017 with a major in political economy and minors in Spanish and Portuguese.

Mathews briefly worked in business development after he was released by the Los Angeles Angels in 2020, before becoming a full-time baseball instructor.
