= Blake Butera =

American baseball manager (born 1992)

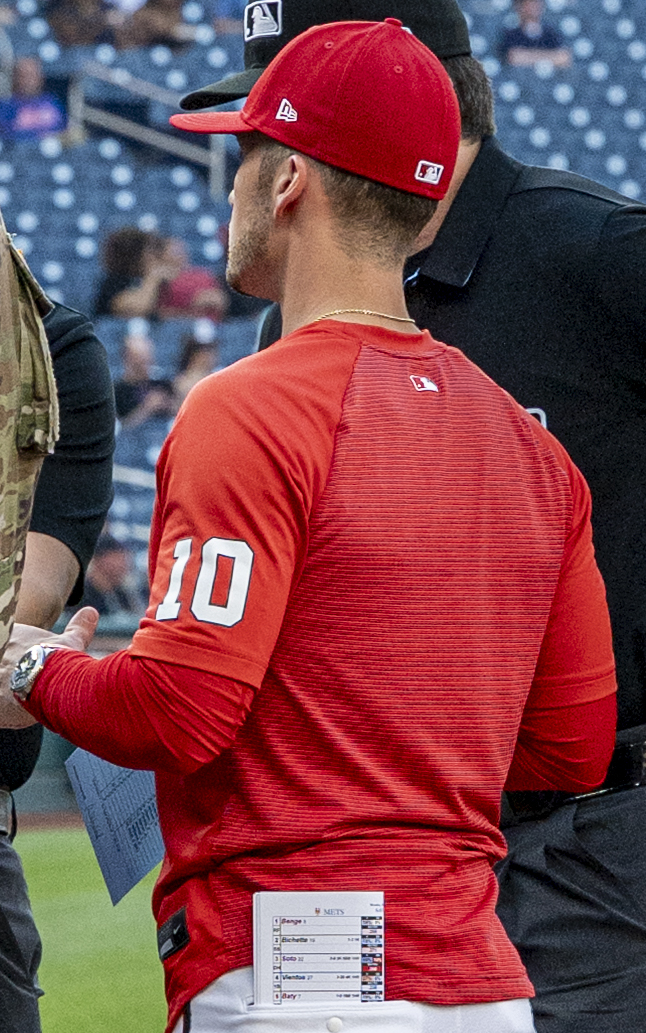
- Butera with the Washington Nationals in 2026

Washington Nationals – No. 10
- Infielder / Manager
- Born: August 7, 1992 (age 34); Metairie, Louisiana, U.S.
- Bats: Right Throws: Right

MLB statistics (through September 27, 2026)
- Managerial record: 77–85
- Winning %: .468
- Stats at Baseball Reference
- Managerial record at Baseball Reference

Teams
- As manager: Washington Nationals (2026–present)

Blake Matthew Butera (born August 7, 1992) is an American professional baseball manager who is the manager for the Washington Nationals of Major League Baseball (MLB).

Butera attended Boston College and played baseball there from 2011 to 2015. Originally drafted by the Tampa Bay Rays in 2015, he spent two seasons in Minor League Baseball (MiLB) before becoming a manager for the Hudson Valley Renegades and the Charleston RiverDogs. He was hired by the Nationals before the 2026 season.

== Playing career ==
Butera attended Mandeville High School in Mandeville, Louisiana, and enrolled at Boston College to play college baseball for the Boston College Eagles. He was voted team captain as a college senior in 2015. Over his collegiate career, he ranked first in Boston College's record books with 112 walks and 774 at bats; second with 207 games played, 205 games started, and 346 times reaching base; tied for sixth with 205 hits, and third with 29 times hit by pitch. In 2015, he recorded five sacrifice flies, tied for eighth on the program's single-season list. As a freshman in 2012, Butera drew 31 walks, tied for ninth on the single-season record list, and posted a 13-game hitting streak ranking seventh since 2005. His 12-game hitting streak in 2014 ranked ninth among all Boston College players. He also recorded four career walk-off hits.

The Tampa Bay Rays selected Butera in the 35th round (1,048th overall) of the 2015 Major League Baseball draft. He made his professional debut with the rookie-level Princeton Rays, hitting .207 with one home run, six RBI, and three stolen bases across 27 games. In 2016, Butera played for both Princeton and the Low-A Hudson Valley Renegades, slashing a combined .247/.344/.360 with two home runs, 25 RBI, and five stolen bases. Butera was released by the Rays organization on March 29, 2017.

== Managerial career ==
=== Tampa Bay Rays ===
In 2018, at the age of 25 years old, Butera was named the manager of the Hudson Valley Renegades, becoming the youngest manager in Minor League Baseball. He had played as an infielder for the Renegades in 2016 and was their first base coach in 2017. He managed the Renegades for two seasons, compiling a record of 88 wins and 62 losses.

Butera was the manager of the Charleston RiverDogs in the 2021 and 2022 seasons. He posted a record of 170 wins and 82 losses in the two seasons with the RiverDogs. He won Manager of the Year awards in Minor League Baseball and won two league championships. In 2023, Butera served as the Rays' assistant field coordinator, and in 2024 he was promoted to senior director of player development.

=== Washington Nationals ===
On October 31, 2025, Butera was announced as the new manager of the Washington Nationals. At 33, he became the youngest MLB manager since the Minnesota Twins hired Frank Quilici in 1972.

== Managerial record ==
Updated through September 27, 2026

Team	Year	Regular season					Postseason			
Team	Year	Games	Won	Lost	Win %	Finish	Won	Lost	Win %	Result
WSH	2026	162	77	85	.475	4th	–	–	–	–
Total		162	77	85	.475	–	–	–	–	–

== Personal life ==
Butera married Caroline Margolis in October 2021. The couple's first child was born in October 2025.
