= Toboni =

Toboni is a surname. Notable people with the surname include:

- Jacqueline Toboni (born 1992), American actress
- Paul Toboni (born 1990), American baseball executive
