= Washington Nationals =

Major League Baseball franchise in Washington, D.C.

- 2026 Washington Nationals season

Logo	Cap insignia
- Established in 1969; Based in Washington, D.C. since 2005

Major league affiliations
- National League (1969–present); East Division (1969–present)

Current uniform
- Retired numbers: 11; 42

Colors
- Scarlet red, navy blue, white

Name
- Washington Nationals (2005–present); Montreal Expos (1969–2004)

Nicknames
- Nats

Ballpark
- Nationals Park (2008–present); Robert F. Kennedy Memorial Stadium (2005–2007); Olympic Stadium (1977–2004); Jarry Park Stadium (1969–1976)

Major league titles
- World Series titles (1): 2019
- NL pennants (1): 2019
- NL East division titles (5): 1981; 2012; 2014; 2016; 2017
- Wild card berths (1): 2019

Front office
- Principal owner: Mark Lerner
- President of baseball operations: Paul Toboni
- General manager: Anirudh Kilambi
- Manager: Blake Butera
- Mascot: Screech
- Website: mlb.com/nationals

The Washington Nationals are an American professional baseball team based in Washington, D.C. The Nationals compete in Major League Baseball (MLB) as a member club of the National League (NL) East Division. They play their home games at Nationals Park, located on South Capitol Street in the Navy Yard neighborhood of the Southeast quadrant of D.C. along the Anacostia River.

The Nationals are the eighth major league franchise to be based in Washington, D.C., and the first since 1971. The current franchise was founded in 1969 as the Montreal Expos as part of a four-team expansion. After a failed contraction plan, MLB bought the Expos, seeking to move the team to a new city. After playing the 2003 and 2004 seasons in both Montreal and San Juan, MLB owners chose Washington, D.C., in 2004 and established the Nationals the next year, in 2005. This was the first MLB franchise move since 1971 when the third Washington Senators moved to Arlington, Texas, to become the Texas Rangers. No other MLB team would move until the 2025 season, when the Oakland Athletics relocated to West Sacramento in advance of their ultimately planned Las Vegas.

While the team initially struggled after moving to Washington, the Nationals enjoyed considerable success throughout the 2010s. The team had back-to-back first overall picks in the MLB draft in 2009 and 2010, selecting Stephen Strasburg and Bryce Harper. The team secured their first playoff berth and first division title in 2012 and won the National League East again in 2014, 2016, and 2017, but failed to advance past the NLDS each time. In 2019, the team advanced to the World Series as a Wild Card team and defeated the Houston Astros in seven games to earn their first championship.

As of the end of the 2025 season, the franchise's overall win–loss record is 4,331–4,665–4 (.481). Since moving to Washington, D.C., their overall win–loss record is 1,576–1,722 (.478)

== Background ==
=== Early baseball in Washington, D.C. ===
Multiple short-lived baseball franchises, including two named the Nationals, played in Washington with the National Association in the 1870s. (Note: They were: the Washington Olympics for 41 games in 1871–1872, the Washington Nationals for 11 games in 1872, the Washington Blue Legs for 39 games in 1873, and a different Washington Nationals franchise for 28 games in 1875.) The first Washington Nationals team in a major league played in the American Association in 1884. Another Washington Nationals team also played in the Union Association during its only season in 1884. The first Washington Nationals of the National League played from 1886 to 1889.

=== Washington Senators / Statesmen / Nationals ===
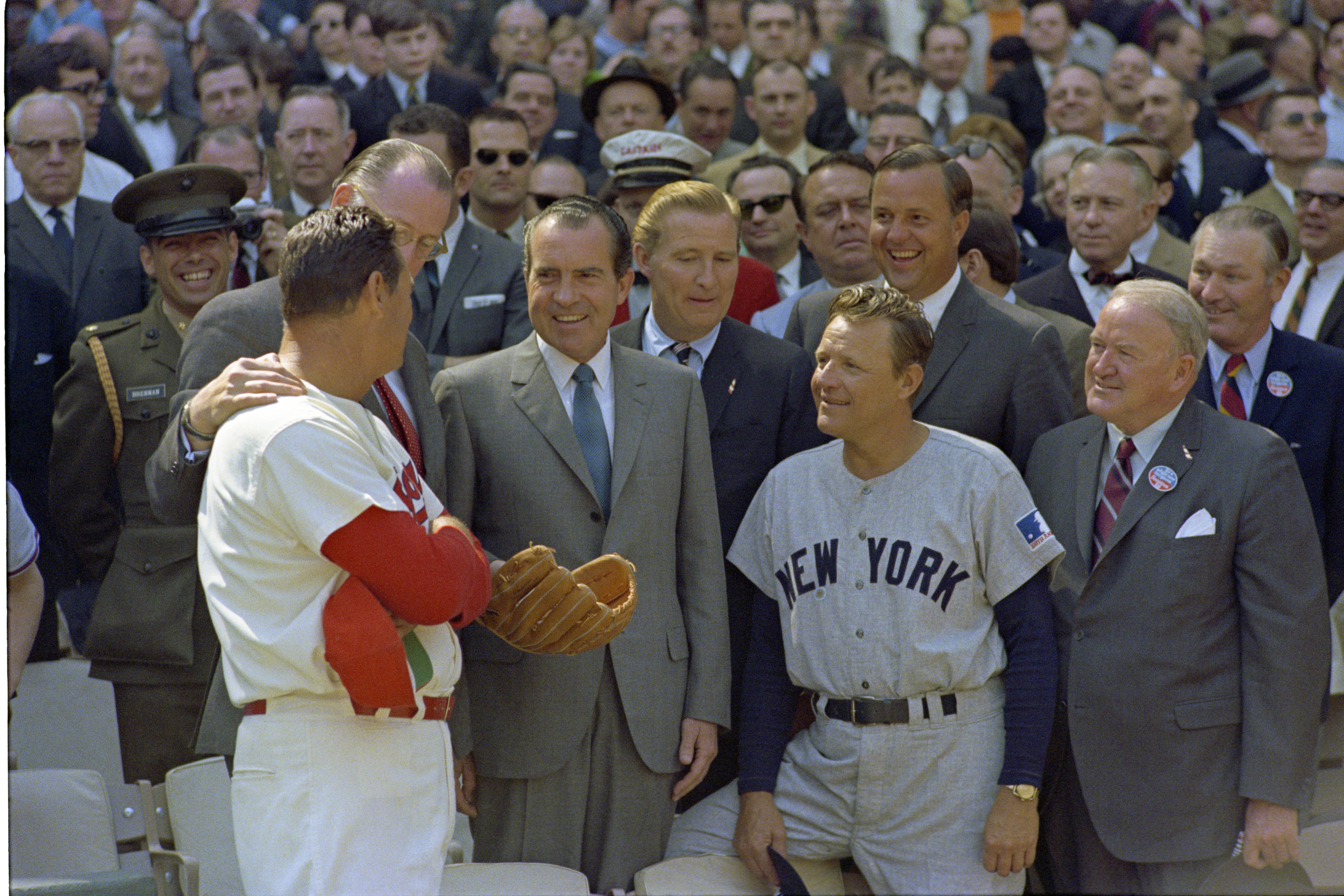
President Richard Nixon at the Washington Senators' opening game with the New York Yankees at RFK Stadium, 1969

The Washington Statesmen played in the American Association in 1891, before jumping to the National League as the Senators the following season. The Washington Senators, who were often referred to as the Nationals, played in the National League from 1892 to 1899. They were followed in 1901 by another Washington Senators franchise — a charter member of the new American League — who were officially named the Washington Nationals from 1905 to 1955. In 1912, another Washington Senators team formed as one of eight teams of the United States Baseball League. But the league and the team folded after just over a month of play in 1912.

The first American League Senators franchise moved to Minneapolis after the 1960 season and became the Minnesota Twins. MLB awarded Washington an expansion team, the second American League Senators franchise, which began play in 1961 but moved to Arlington, Texas after the 1971 season to become the Texas Rangers.

=== Montreal Expos ===
The Montreal Expos were part of the 1969 Major League Baseball expansion, which included the Seattle Pilots (now the Milwaukee Brewers), Kansas City Royals, and San Diego Padres. Based in Montreal, the Expos were the first Major League team in Canada and were named after the Expo 67 World's Fair. The majority-share owner was Charles Bronfman, a major shareholder in Seagram.

The Expos saw poor on-field results through their lifetime leading into the 1990s, never winning their division except in the second half of the strike-split 1981 season. Bronfman sold the team to a consortium of owners in 1991, with Claude Brochu as the managing general partner. In 1994, the Expos, led by a talented group of players including Larry Walker, Moisés Alou, Marquis Grissom and Pedro Martínez, had the best record in the major leagues until the 1994–95 Major League Baseball strike forced the cancellation of the remainder of the season. After the disappointment of 1994, Expos management began shedding its key players and the team's fan support dwindled. Brochu sold control of the team to Jeffrey Loria in 1999, but Loria failed to secure funding to build a new downtown ballpark and did not reach an agreement on television or English radio broadcast contracts for the 2000 season, reducing the team's media coverage.

=== Proposed 2001 contraction ===
After the 2001 season, MLB considered revoking the team's franchise, along with that of either the Minnesota Twins or the Tampa Bay Devil Rays. In November 2001, Major League Baseball's owners voted 28–2 to contract the league by two teams — according to various sources, the Expos and the Minnesota Twins, both of which reportedly voted against contraction. Subsequently, the Boston Red Sox were sold to a partnership led by John W. Henry, owner of the Florida Marlins. In order to clear the way for Henry's group to assume Red Sox ownership, Henry sold the Marlins to Loria who in turn sold the Expos to MLB. However, the Metropolitan Sports Facilities Commission, the Metrodome's operator, won an injunction requiring the Twins to play there in 2002. MLB's inability to revoke the Twins franchise compelled it to keep both the Twins and Expos as part of the regular season schedule. The collective bargaining agreement signed with the Major League Baseball Players Association (MLBPA) in August 2002 prohibited contraction until the end of the contract in 2006. By that time, the Expos had become the Washington Nationals and the Twins had made sufficient progress towards the eventual building of a new baseball-specific stadium that contraction was no longer on the agenda.

== History ==
=== Move to DC (2004–2005) ===
With contraction no longer an option in the immediate term, MLB began looking for a new site for the Expos. Some of the choices included Oklahoma City; Washington, D.C.; San Juan, Puerto Rico; Monterrey, Mexico; Portland, Oregon; Northern Virginia (such as Arlington or Dulles); Norfolk, Virginia; Las Vegas; and Charlotte, North Carolina. Washington, D.C., and both Virginia locations emerged as the front-runners.

On September 29, 2004, MLB announced that the Expos would move to Washington, D.C., for the 2005 season, returning professional baseball to the United States's capital. On November 15, arbitrators struck down a lawsuit former team owners brought against MLB and former majority owner Jeffrey Loria, bringing to an end all legal actions that could have impeded a move. The other MLB team owners approved the move to Washington, D.C., in a 28–1 vote on December 3 (Baltimore Orioles owner Peter Angelos cast the sole dissenting vote).

Although there was some sentiment to revive the name Senators when the Expos moved to Washington in 2005, legal and political considerations factored into the choice of Nationals, a revival of the first American League franchise's official name used from 1901 to 1956. Politicians and others in the District of Columbia objected to the name Senators because the District of Columbia does not have voting representation in Congress. In addition, the Rangers still owned the rights to the Senators name.

The Rangers’ ownership of the trademark Washington Senators was never an issue in the naming of the team. On November 17, 2004 the Texas Rangers Baseball Partners sold for $1 (“assigned” is the USPTO term) all trademarks, service marks, and copyrights of the former Washington Senators AND Washington Nationals Major League Baseball Washington, D.C. clubs to Baseball Expos, L.P. (owned by Major League Baseball, who later assigned the trademarks to the Washington Nationals Baseball Club, LLC when the team’s owner was selected)—

https://assignmentcenter.uspto.gov/ipas/search/api/v2/public/download/trademark/3234/0084

Washington, D.C., mayor Anthony A. Williams supported the name "Washington Grays" in honor of the Negro-league team Homestead Grays (1929–1950), which had been based in Pittsburgh but played most of their home games in Washington's Griffith Stadium during much of the 1940s. On November 21, 2004, the team's management chose the name "Washington Nationals", revealing the club's official colors of red, white, and blue the next day. The team would begin their tenure in DC at RFK Stadium, while planning a move to a new, purpose built stadium which was under construction.

The Nationals played their first game on April 4, 2005, at Citizens Bank Park in South Philadelphia, losing to the Philadelphia Phillies 8–4. The Nationals finished their inaugural season at .500 with an 81–81 record. Its first draft pick as the Nationals was Virginia native and University of Virginia graduate Ryan Zimmerman in the first round of the 2005 draft. Zimmerman made his MLB debut in 2005 and became one of the team's best players and the face of the franchise, playing his entire career with the Nationals.

=== Early struggles (2006–2010) ===
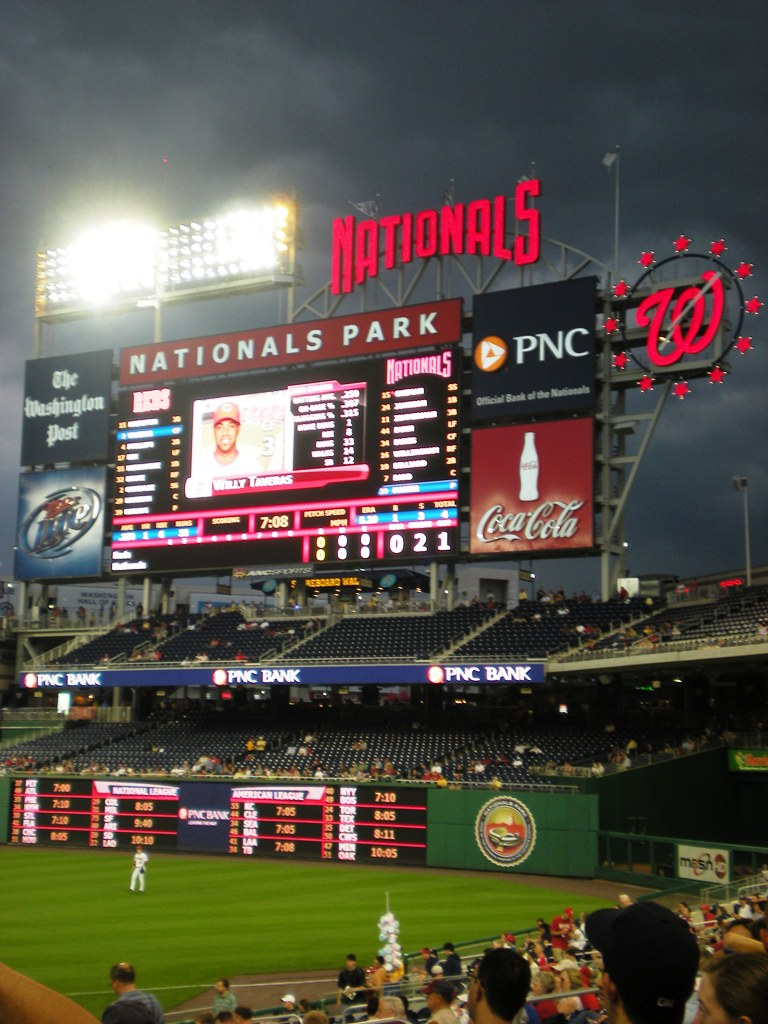
Nationals versus the Cincinnati Reds in 2009 at Nationals Park

When Ted Lerner took over the club in mid-2006, he hired Stan Kasten as team president. Kasten was widely known as the Atlanta Braves' architect before and during their run of 14 division titles. Kasten was also the General Manager or president of many other Atlanta-area sports teams, including the Atlanta Hawks and Atlanta Thrashers. "The Plan", as it became known, was a long-range rebuilding and restructuring of the team from the ground up. This plan included investing in the farm system and the draft to build a team suitable for their new stadium.

In the front office, the Nationals hired well-respected former Arizona scouting director Mike Rizzo to be the Vice President of Baseball Operations, second in charge under then-general manager Jim Bowden. Rizzo would take over as the National's general manager in 2009.

For the 2008 season, the Nationals moved to their new stadium, dubbed Nationals Park. The Nationals played their first home game there on March 30, 2008. ESPN televised the game nationally, for which U.S. President George W. Bush threw out the first pitch. Ryan Zimmerman hit his fifth career walk-off home run to give the Nationals a win in the first game in their new stadium.

The Nationals finished in last place in four out of five years from 2006 to 2010, but began building the foundations of a contender with their first-overall draft picks of pitcher Stephen Strasburg (in 2009) and catcher Bryce Harper, whom the team converted to the outfield, (in 2010), as well as their sixth-overall draft pick of infielder Anthony Rendon (in 2011). Strasburg, one of the most anticipated prospects in baseball history, struck out 14 batters in his 2010 Major League debut at home against the Pittsburgh Pirates.

=== Winning years and playoff stumbles (2011–2018) ===
In 2011, the Nationals signed Jayson Werth to the team's first big free-agent contract. With a mix of homegrown players and players acquired via trade and free agency, the Nationals clinched their first playoff berth and first division title in 2012. Teenage phenom Harper was named NL Rookie of the Year, the youngest ever to win. The Nationals were knocked out of the 2012 NLDS by the St. Louis Cardinals in five games after the Cardinals took the lead with two outs in the top of the ninth of game 5. After missing the playoffs in 2013, they hired Matt Williams as manager and rebounded to win their second division title in 2014, but were eliminated in the 2014 NLDS by the San Francisco Giants. In 2014, they acquired shortstop prospect Trea Turner in a trade with the San Diego Padres, with Turner eventually becoming a major part of the Nationals' core.

In 2015, the Nationals signed top free agent pitcher Max Scherzer to a 7-year, $210 million contract. That year, Harper had one of the greatest offensive seasons in MLB history, becoming the youngest player to win the NL MVP unanimously. Despite strong individual showings, the Nationals missed the playoffs, leading to Williams' firing. The team hired veteran manager Dusty Baker in 2016, and returned to the playoffs only to be eliminated by the Los Angeles Dodgers in the 2016 NLDS in five games. They won the NL East title in 2017, but were eliminated in the NLDS yet again after losing game 5 to the Chicago Cubs. Baker's contract was not renewed after the 2017 playoff loss, and the team hired Dave Martinez as their sixth manager in ten years.

In 2018, the All-Star Game was played at Nationals Park. 19-year-old phenom Juan Soto had an exceptional debut campaign, finishing 2nd in NL Rookie of the Year Voting. The Nationals failed to make the playoffs in 2018, finishing a disappointing second in a year they were expected to sail to the playoffs. After the 2018 season, superstar slugger Bryce Harper left the team via free agency, signing with the rival Philadelphia Phillies.

=== World Series win (2019) ===
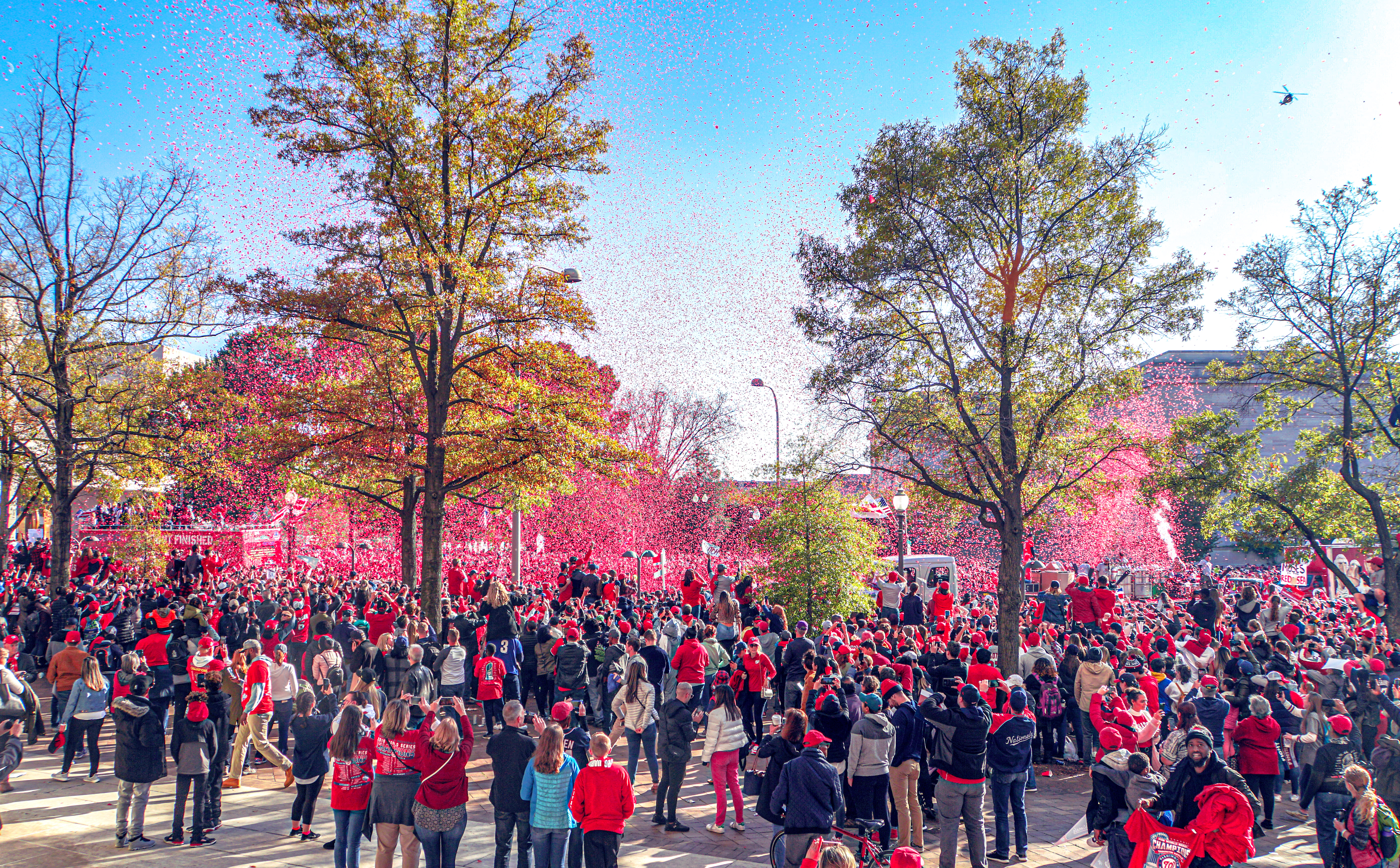
2019 World Series victory parade

The Nationals began the 2019 season with a record of 19–31, with their projected chances of winning the World Series at that time being 1.5 percent. They then posted a 74–38 record over the remaining 112 games, finishing with an overall record of 93-69 and earning a spot in the 2019 National League Wild Card Game, which they won over the Milwaukee Brewers 4–3. In the NLDS, the Nationals defeated the Los Angeles Dodgers in five games, propelling them past the divisional round for the first time in franchise history. The Nationals then swept the St. Louis Cardinals in the NLCS, giving them their first NL pennant. The team then defeated the Houston Astros in game seven of the 2019 World Series, giving them their first World Series championship, with Strasburg being voted series MVP. The World Series was the first in MLB history that saw no team win a game at home, as the road team won all seven. The Nationals went a perfect 5–0 in elimination games during the playoffs, all of which were come-from-behind victories, the first team in MLB history to do so.

=== Post–World Series decline (2020–2025) ===
Franchise cornerstone Anthony Rendon left in free agency for the Los Angeles Angels after the 2019 season. The Nationals agreed to re-sign fellow building block Stephen Strasburg to a massive seven-year deal that guaranteed him $245 million. However, injuries limited him to just 31 and 1/3 innings under the contract, and eventually forced him to retire in 2024. The Nationals struggled in 2020, when the coronavirus pandemic led to the season being shortened to 60 games; the team finished 26-34 and missed the playoffs. After another disappointing start to the 2021 season, in which the team was under .500 at the trade deadline, GM Mike Rizzo disassembled much of the team, trading ace pitcher Max Scherzer and superstar shortstop Trea Turner to the Dodgers, among many other trades of starting players in exchange for prospects, signifying the start of a rebuilding process. Ryan Zimmerman, the longtime face of the franchise who had been with the team since its inaugural 2005 season, announced his retirement after the 2021 season, marking the end of the first era of Nationals baseball.

On August 2, 2022, the Nationals sent 23-year-old superstar Juan Soto to the San Diego Padres in a blockbuster trade after he turned down a 15-year, $440 million contract extension offer, which would have constituted the richest contract in baseball history. In doing so, the Nationals lost its franchise icon and one of the last integral players from the 2019 championship team. The Nationals received one of the largest prospect hauls in any single trade in baseball history in return, with the front office hoping that the elite prospects would form the core of the next championship team. After trading Soto and others, the Nationals finished the 2022 season with the worst record in baseball at 55–107.

In 2022, The Washington Post reported that the Lerner family was exploring a restructuring of the team's ownership, including the possibility of selling the team outright. Ted Lerner died prior to the 2023 season from pneumonia complications; his son Mark had become the public-facing principal owner in 2018, though Ted had retained his full interest in the team's decisions.

The Nationals would begin to bounce back after 2022, as young players such as CJ Abrams and Josiah Gray led them to an improvement of 16 wins in 2023, finishing at 71–91. Additionally, the rebuild had strengthened a once-weak group of prospects. ESPN's annual farm system ranking showed improvement from 30th entering 2021 to 22nd in 2022, 13th in 2023, and 16th in 2024.

The Nationals ended the 2024 season with the same record as 2023 at 71–91. However, the rebuild progressed with top prospects James Wood, acquired via the Soto trade, and Dylan Crews, drafted #2 overall in 2023, making their debuts. Additionally, shortstop CJ Abrams, also acquired via the Soto trade, was selected to the 2024 All-Star Game. On July 6, 2025, following a disappointing first half of the 2025 season below internal projections for the rebuild, the Nationals fired manager Dave Martinez and general manager Mike Rizzo, who had served as general manager since 2009 and as president of baseball operations since 2013. Miguel Cairo and Mike DeBartolo were named as interim manager and interim general manager, respectively. The Nationals finished the 2025 season with a disappointing 66–96 record.

=== Under new management (2026–present) ===
In September 2025, the Nationals hired former Boston Red Sox senior vice president and assistant general manager Paul Toboni as president of baseball operations. Toboni subsequently led organization-wide staff changes focused on strengthening scouting, player development, and analytics to revitalize the rebuild. On October 31, 2025, the team announced that it had hired Blake Butera as its next manager.

Under Toboni and Butera, the Nationals embarked on an aggressive overhaul of the organization at virtually every level. Butera, already MLB's youngest manager in over half a century at age 33, assembled one of the youngest coaching staffs in recent MLB history. Stating at his introductory press conference that he would not prioritize MLB experience, Butera hired many of his new coaches from backgrounds in player development, including coaches from performance labs such as Driveline Baseball and collegiate programs, as well as minor league managers. Similarly, Toboni filled out his front office principally with fellow executives in their 30s and 40s, creating MLB's youngest front office.

The Nationals redrew their organizational chart, hiring Kansas City Royals executive Jason Sinnarajah to be Toboni's counterpart as president of business operations and hiring Anirudh Kilambi as general manager and Toboni's second-in-command, thereby separating the positions of Nationals president of baseball operations and general manager for the first time in over a decade, after Mike Rizzo had held both titles from 2013 to 2025. The player development hierarchy also saw significant changes, with upper- and lower-level coordinators hired under directors to align Washington's developmental approach.

While the Nationals got off to a stronger-than-expected start in 2026, hanging around the fringes of the playoff chase and holding onto a winning record until as late as July 30, the team dropped out of contention and traded away several key players by early August. Washington finished the year with a 77–85 record, their best mark since 2019.

== Uniforms ==
=== 2005–2008: Original uniforms ===
The Nationals' original home uniforms contained the team name and numbers in red with gold bevels and navy trim, and were paired with the all-red "curly W" cap. The road uniforms contained the city name and numbers in navy with gold bevels and red trim, and were paired with the all-navy "curly W" cap. The front letters of both uniforms formed a distinct bridge-like shape. This set was joined the following season by a red alternate uniform, which featured the interlocking "DC" in white with gold bevels and navy trim, as well as numbers in navy with gold bevels and white trim. The red alternates were paired with the all-red "DC" cap.

The Nationals sported two different sleeve patches with this set. In their inaugural season, the patch featured gold accents, the full team name and two gold stars on the outer navy circle, and the interlocking "DC" on the inner red circle. The patch was tweaked the following season, eliminating the team name in favor of nine gold stars and relegating red to trim color.

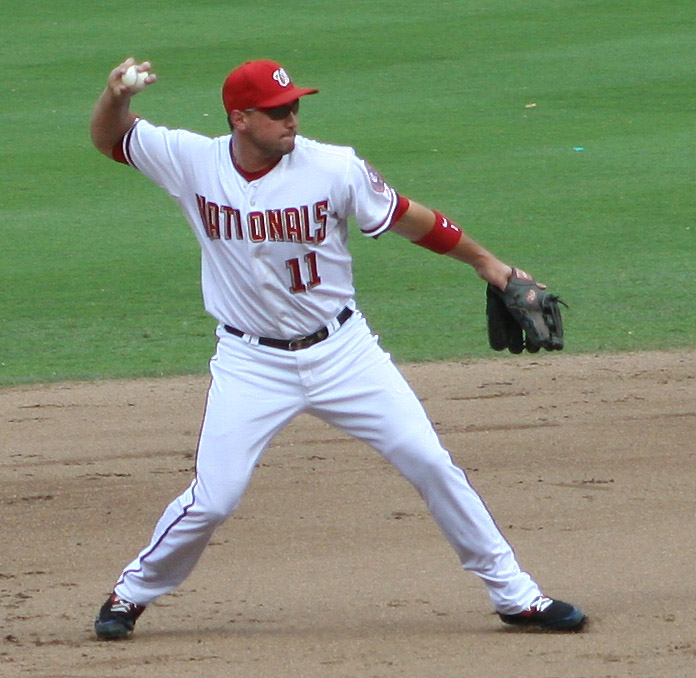
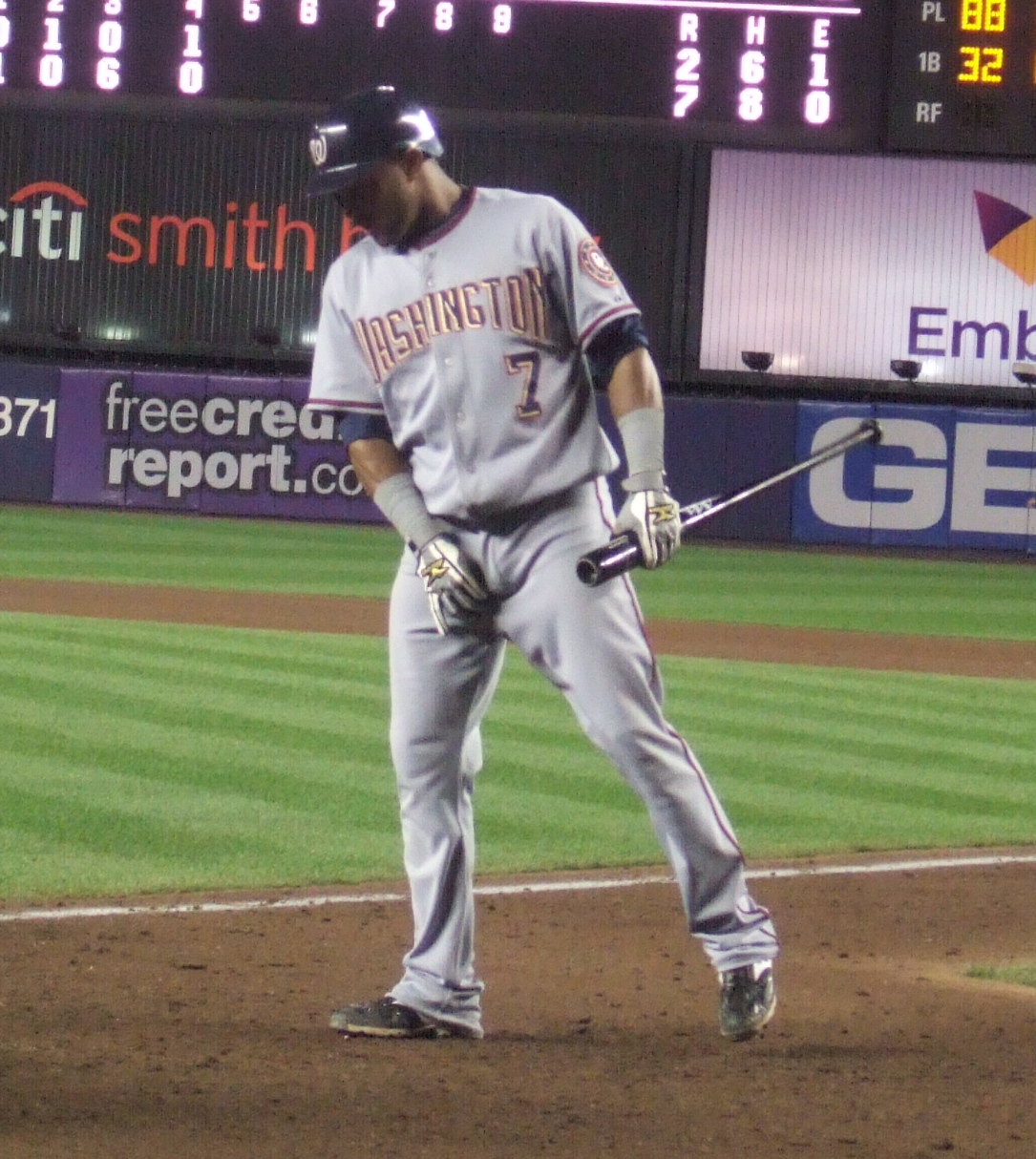
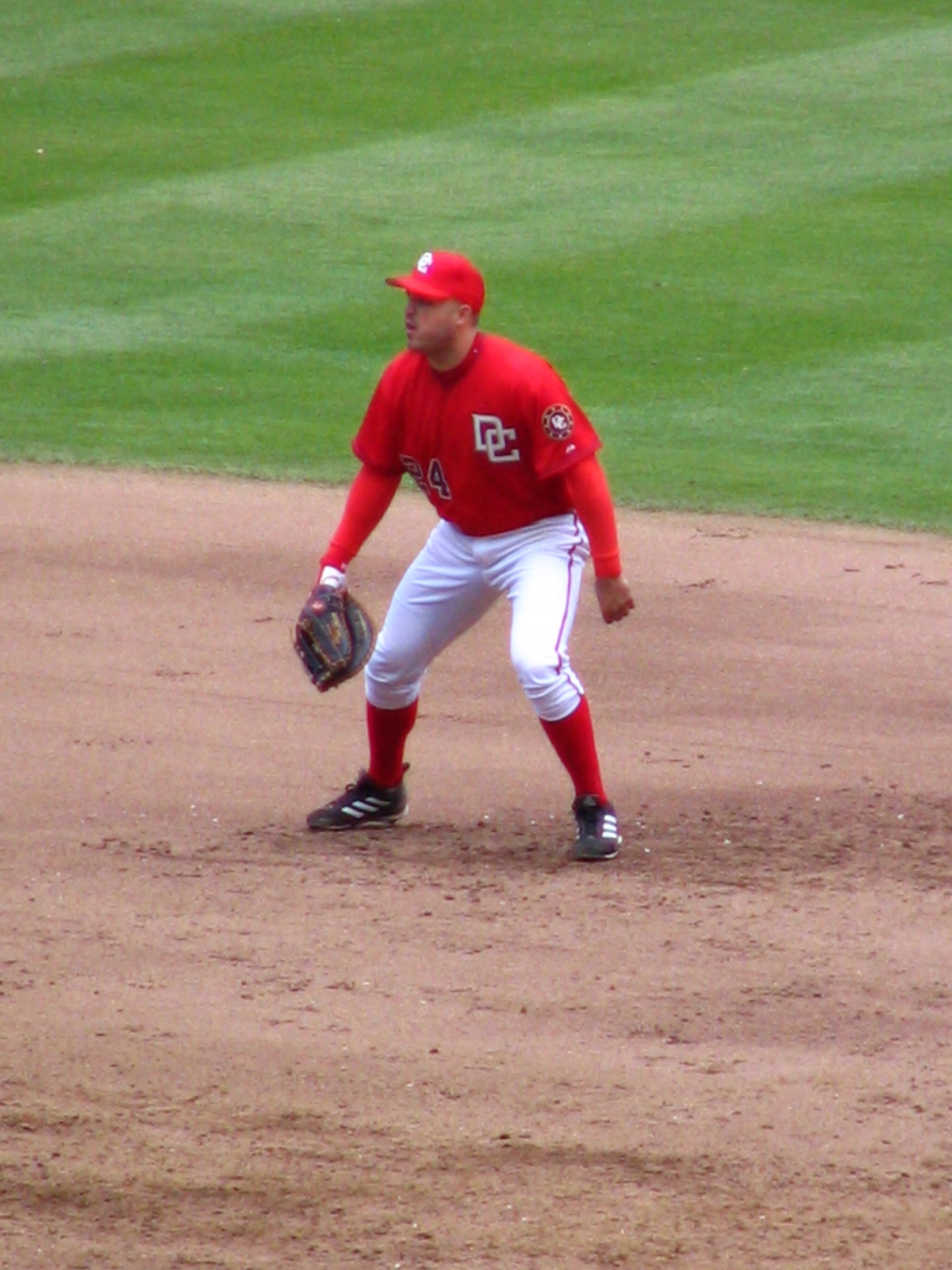
Ryan Zimmerman (left) in the original home uniform; Emilio Bonifácio (center) in the original road uniform; Nick Johnson (right) in the original alternate red uniform.

=== 2009–2010: Road uniform changes ===
For the 2009 season, the Nationals kept the same home uniform but unveiled a new road and red alternate uniform, along with a roundel-less "DC" sleeve patch. The road uniform now featured a script rendition of the city name in front minus the gold bevels, with the letters now rendered in red with navy and gold trim. The red alternate replaced the "DC" logo with the "curly W" logo, and numbers changed to white with gold bevels and navy trim.

=== 2011–2023: "Curly W" uniforms ===
The Nationals unveiled a new uniform set starting in 2011. Gold was eliminated and the emphasis was on the "curly W" logo, which was prominently featured on the home and red alternate uniforms. The road all-navy cap was retired in a favor of a navy cap with red brim, and a new red cap with navy brim was added in 2013 for home games with the red alternates. The sleeve patch was updated to feature the primary roundel logo. Piping was added to the "curly W" uniforms.

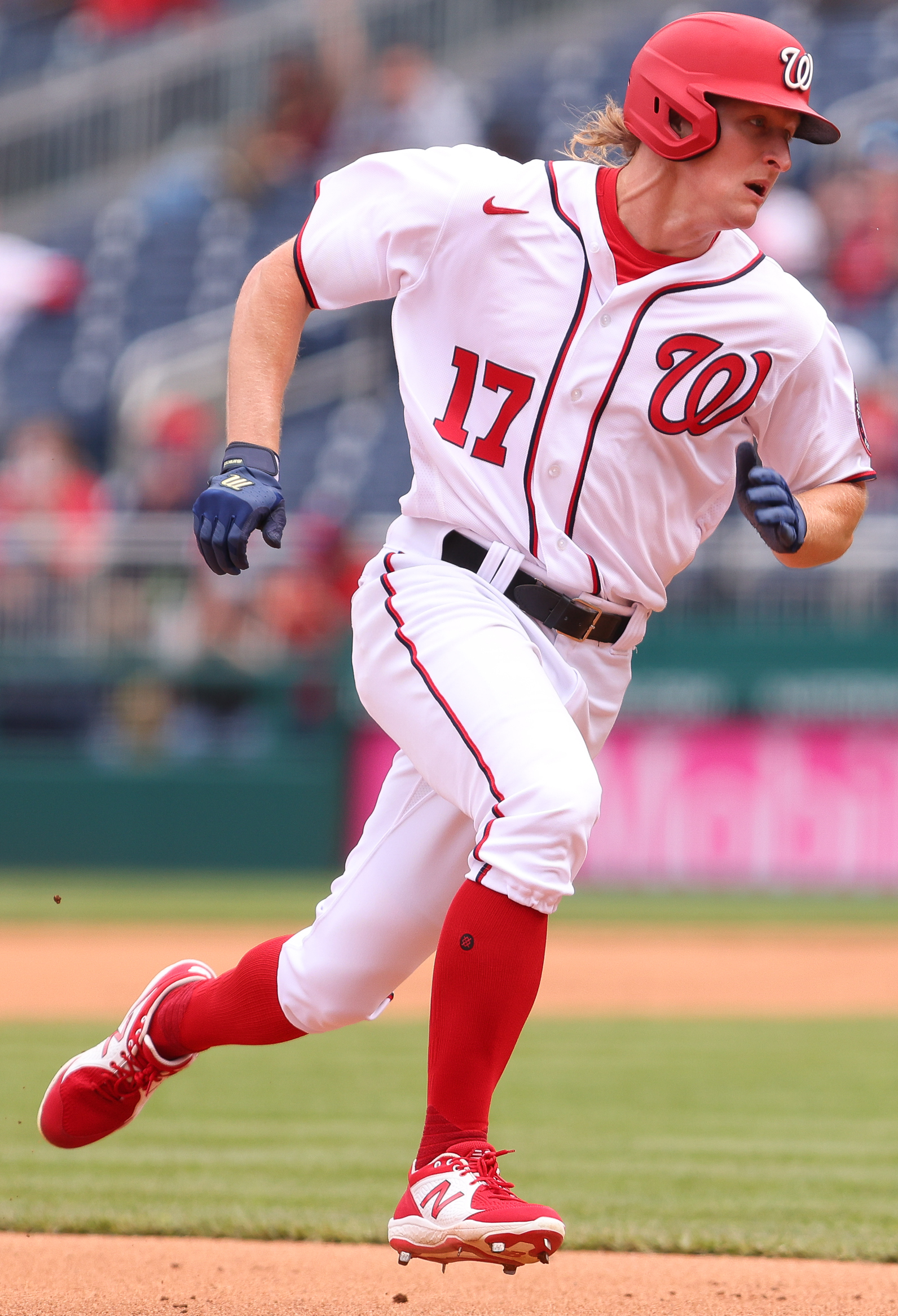
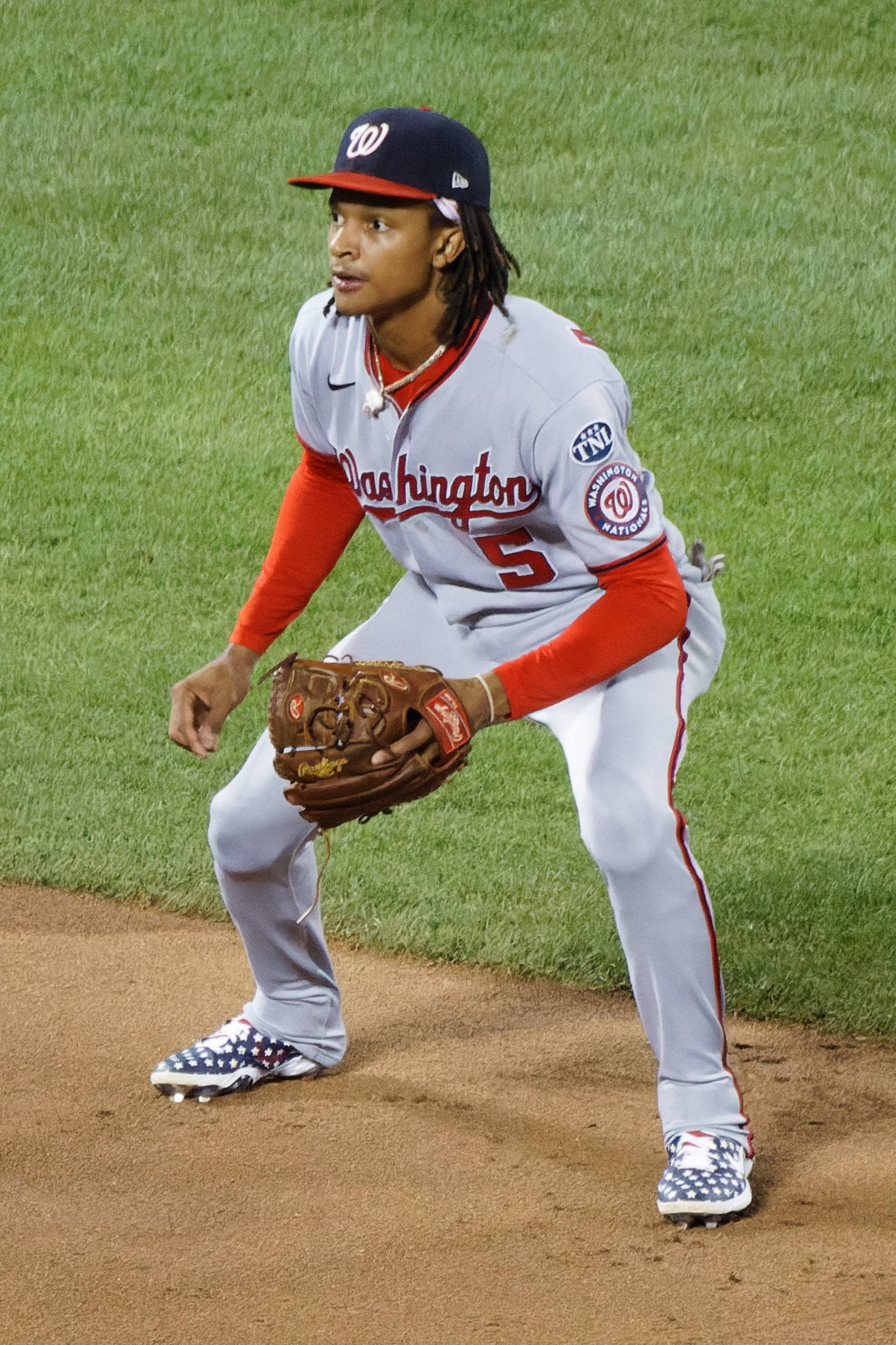
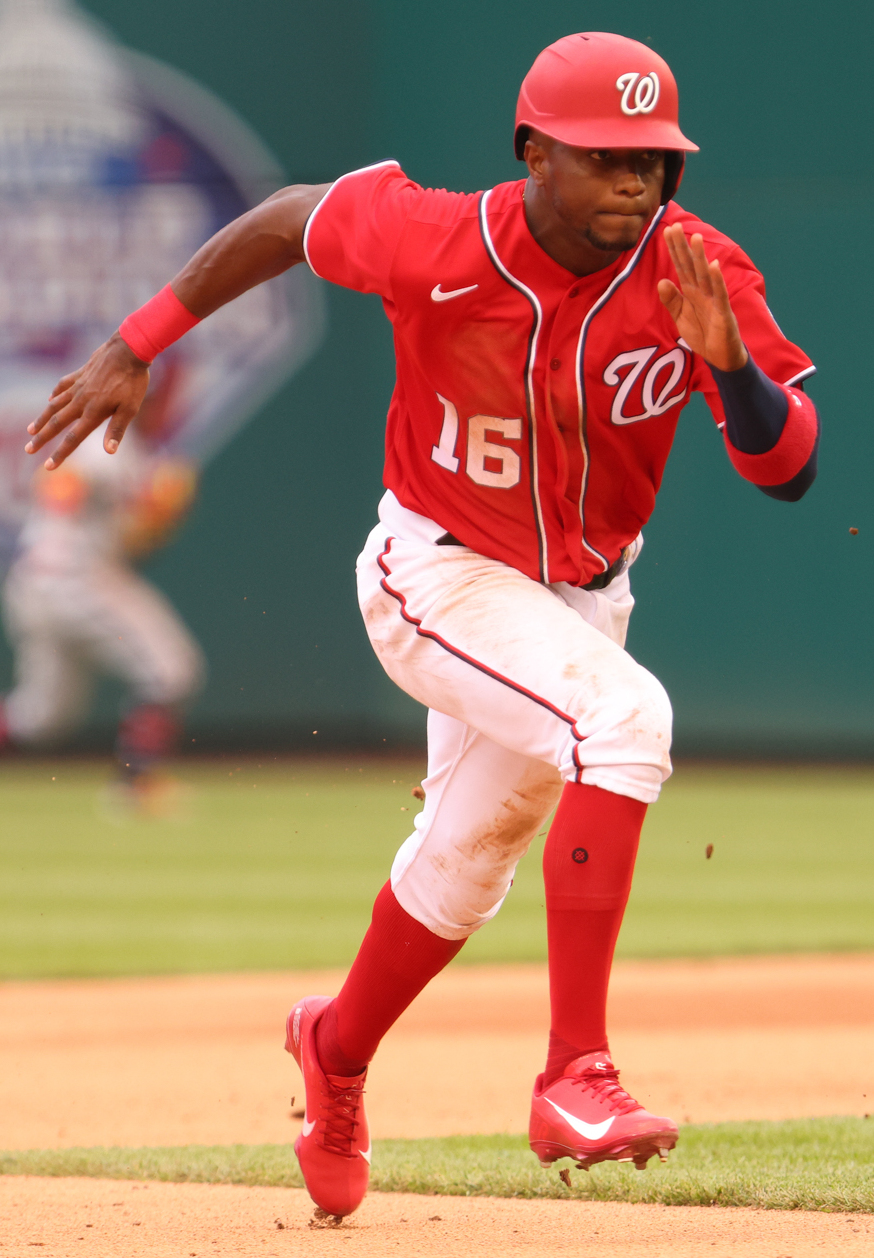
Andrew Stevenson (left) in the "Curly W" home uniform; C. J. Abrams (center) in the road uniform; Víctor Robles (right) in the "Curly W" red uniform.

=== 2018–present: Script "Nationals" uniforms ===
In 2018, the Nationals released a navy alternate uniform, featuring a script rendition of the team's name in white with red trim along with red numbers. The following season, the navy uniform proved to be a good-luck charm for the Nationals, as they went 11–3 while wearing the uniforms en route to winning the World Series. In 2020, a white version was added, with the script version of the team name in navy with red trim. Initially, the Nationals unveiled a pair of white-paneled and red-brimmed alternate caps: one in navy with the United States Capitol dome superimposed over a white block "W", and another in red with a navy block "W" superimposed over the silhouette of a pitcher. Both designs paid homage to the original Washington Senators (now Minnesota Twins) and the expansion Washington Senators (now Texas Rangers). However, only the "Capitol W" cap was used, and the "pitcher W" cap was not utilized on the field at all and immediately retired.

For most of the 2020 season, the Nationals wore gold-accented versions of the new white uniforms in celebration of their World Series championship, along with all-red caps with the gold "curly W" logo. The script white alternates made their on-field debut on the final regular season home game September 27 against the New York Mets, and were paired with the "Capitol W" cap (the red "curly W" batting helmets were used with this uniform). The Nationals did not wear their home and red alternate "curly W" uniforms throughout that shortened season. In 2021, the white alternates were also paired with the primary red "curly W" cap, though the alternate Capitol cap was still used occasionally.

Starting in 2022, the white alternate uniform with the "Nationals" script became the primary home uniform, replacing the white "curly W" uniform.

In 2024, the Nationals updated their road uniform, featuring a block "Washington" lettering in navy with white and red trim. The red "curly W" alternates were replaced by an alternate white pullover uniform with navy sleeves, featuring the "Capitol W" crest on the left chest and a new sleeve patch depicting the "interlocking DC" logo inside the silhouette of Washington, D.C. The chest numbers on both the primary home and alternate navy uniforms were removed.

Ahead of the 2025 season, the Nationals brought back the red alternate uniform after a one-season absence. This iteration kept the "Curly W" logo on the left chest, but the piping was removed. Due to Nike's "4+1" uniform rule, the team retired the "Capitol W" white alternates after only one season.

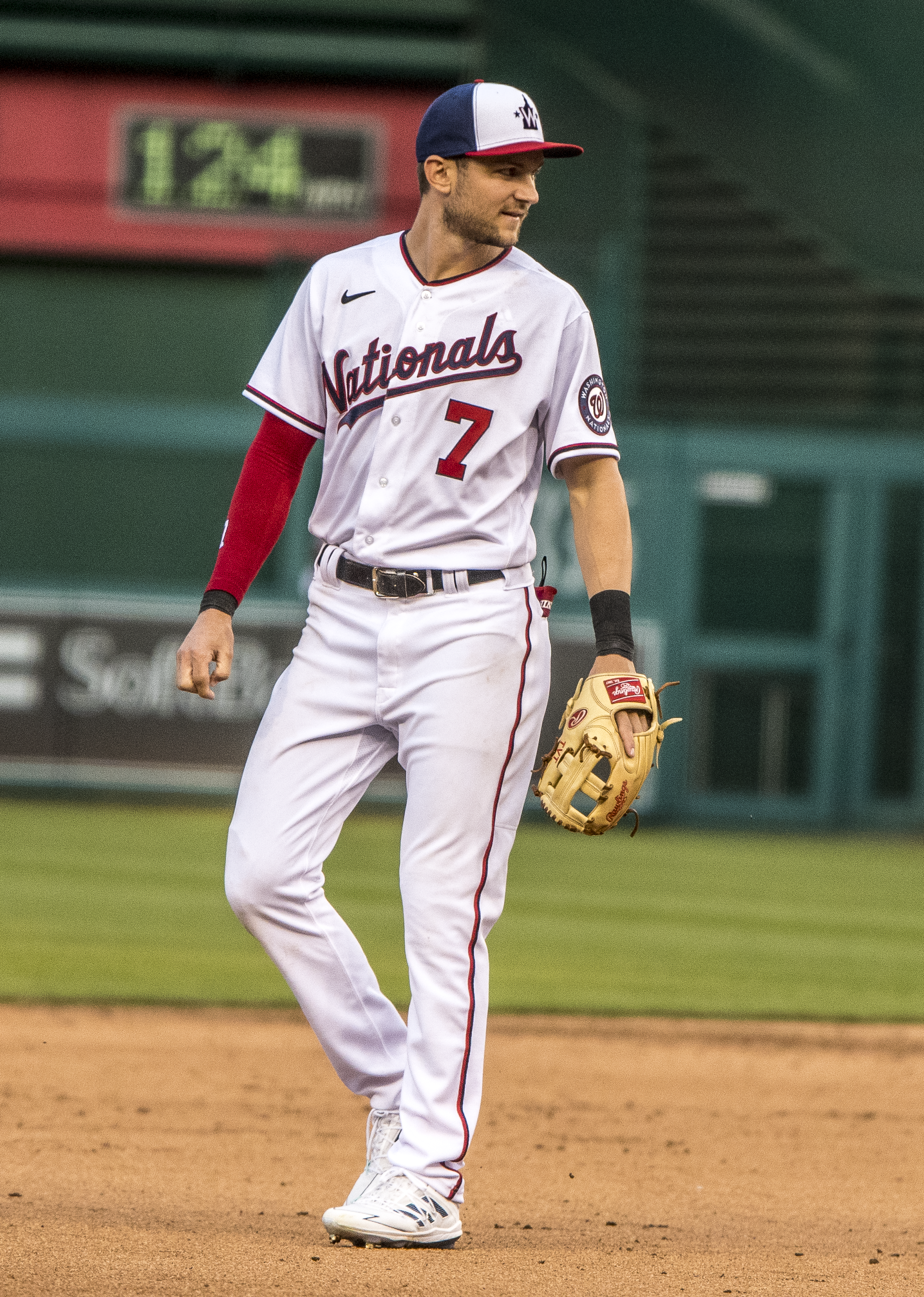
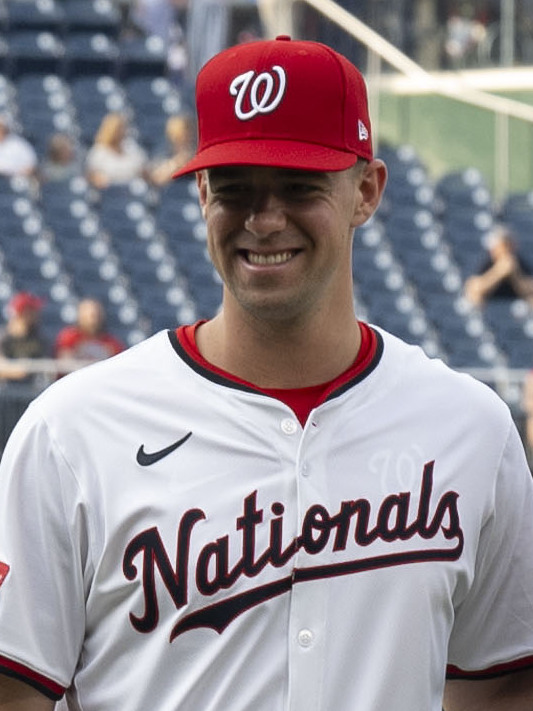
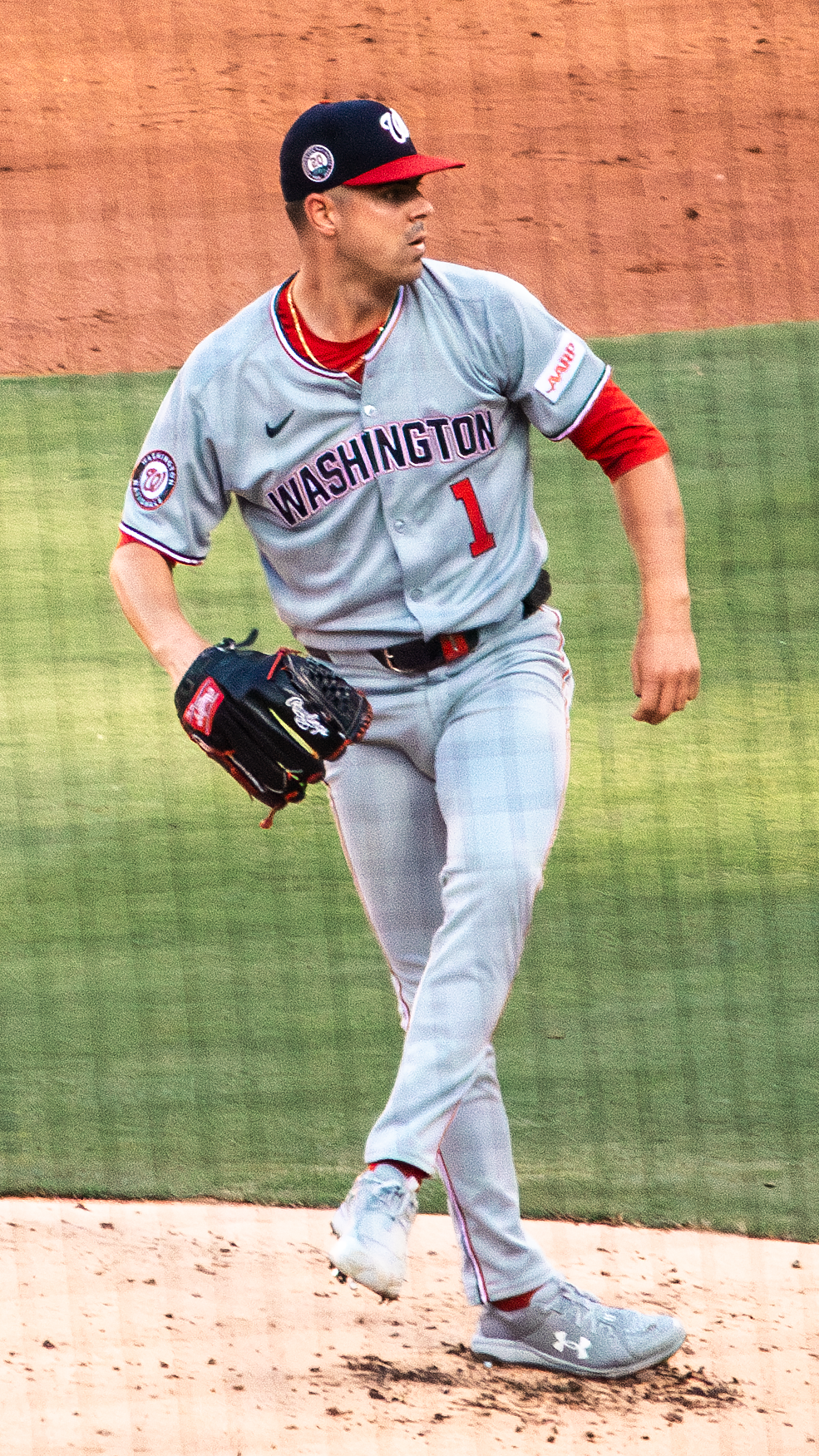
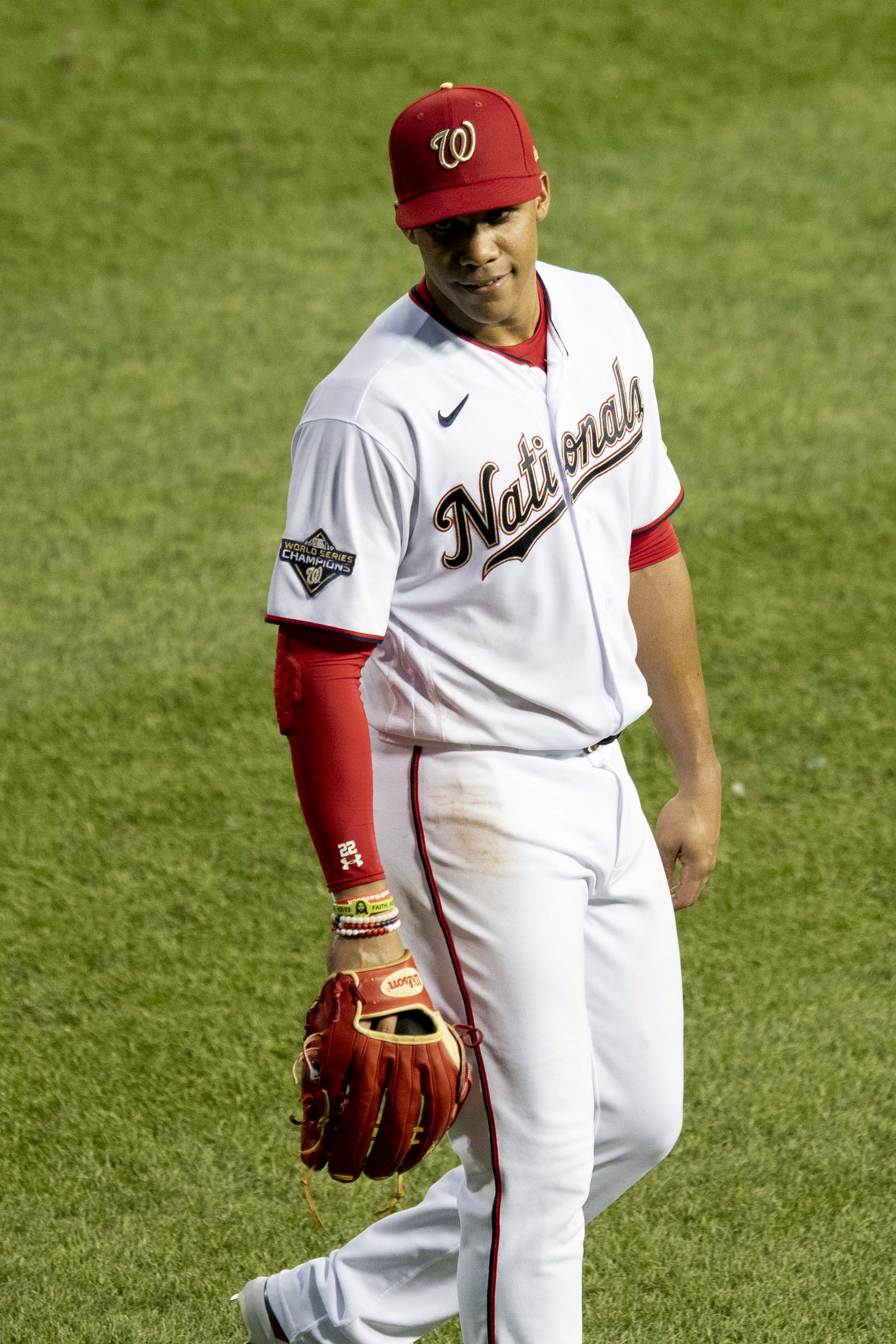
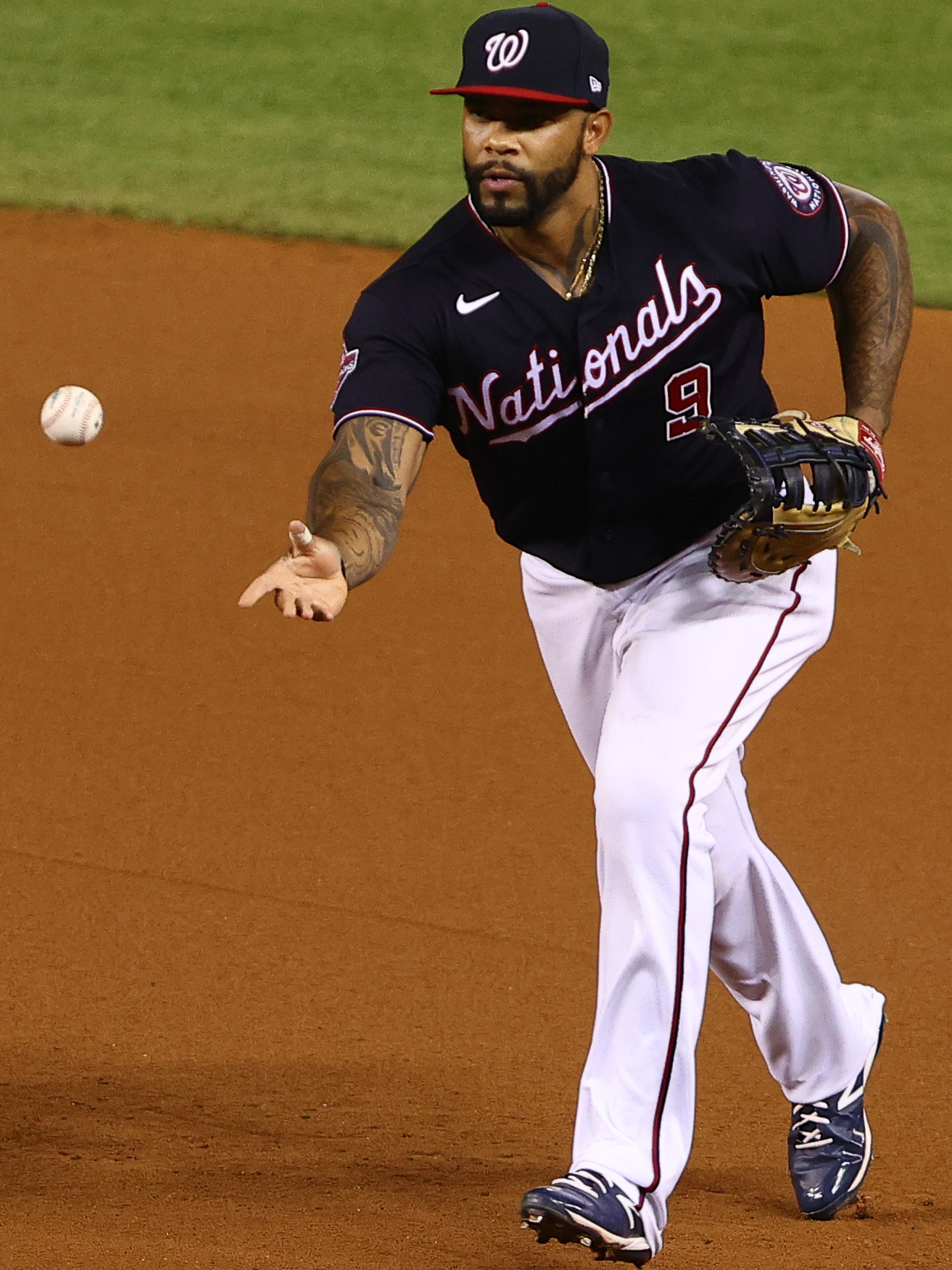
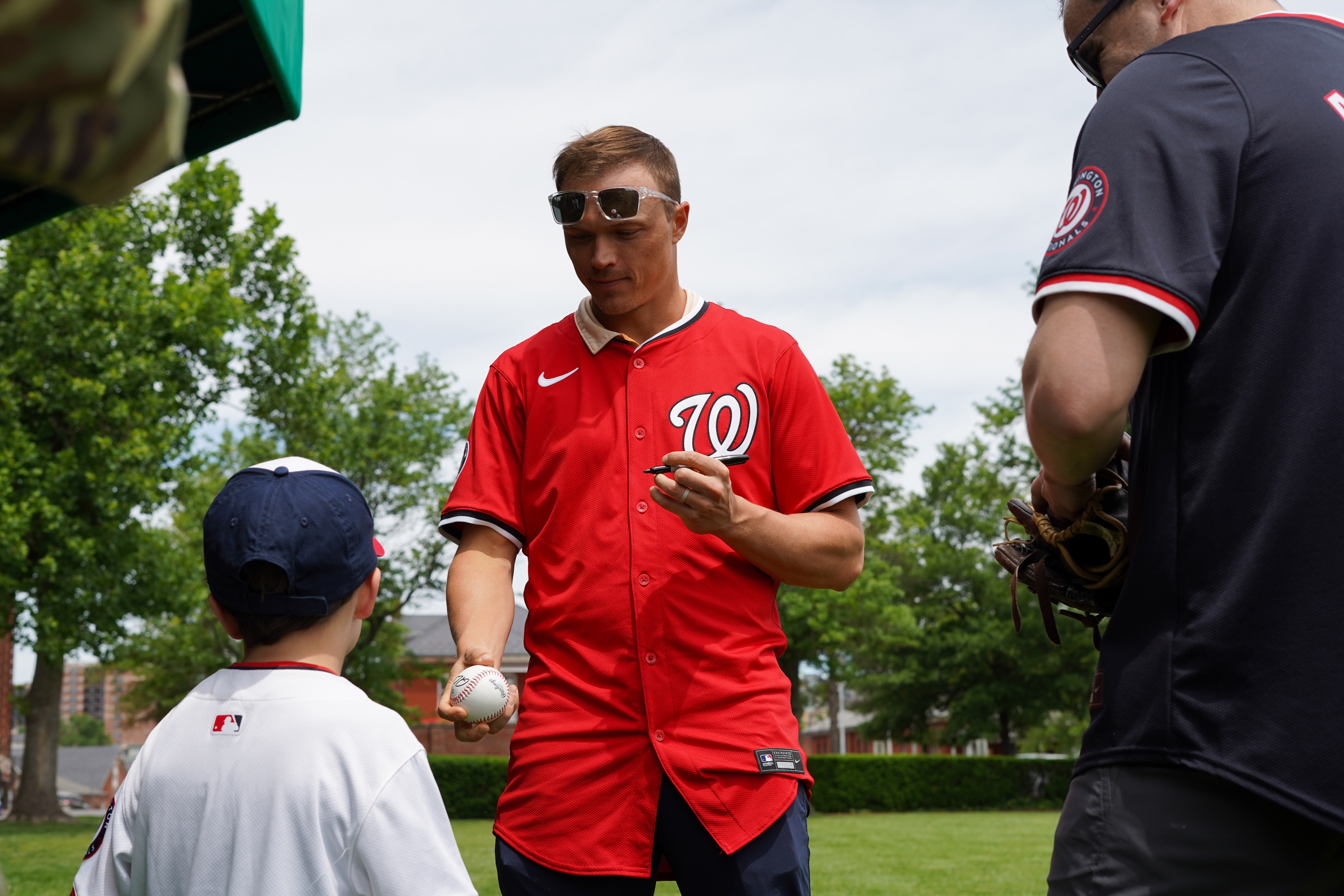
Trea Turner (left) in the script "Nationals" home uniform with chest numbers, used until 2023; Jackson Rutledge (2nd from left) in the script "Nationals" home uniform without chest numbers; MacKenzie Gore (3rd from left) in the block "Washington" road uniform; Juan Soto (3rd from right) in the gold-accented alternate uniform in commemoration of their 2019 World Series championship; Eric Thames (2nd from right) in the script "Nationals" navy uniform (chest numbers removed in 2024); Alex Call (right) in the "Curly W" red uniform top sans piping.

=== City Connect uniform ===
As part of MLB's uniform deal with Nike, selected teams were given themed "City Connect" uniforms. The Nationals' version, unveiled in 2022, paid homage to the cherry blossoms that adorn Washington, D.C., in the spring. The design had a dark gray base with pink trim and printed cherry blossoms. The uniforms were worn during Friday and Saturday home games until 2024. After 2024, the uniforms were retired.

Their second "City Connect" uniform was unveiled in 2025. The uniform is light blue featuring a white outline of Washington, D.C.'s street grid and an interlocking "DC" on the chest which is meant to resemble the block "W" worn by the 1956 Washington Senators. The cap and shoulder patch features the block "W" with an outline of the United States Capitol dome, as well as two cherry blossoms.

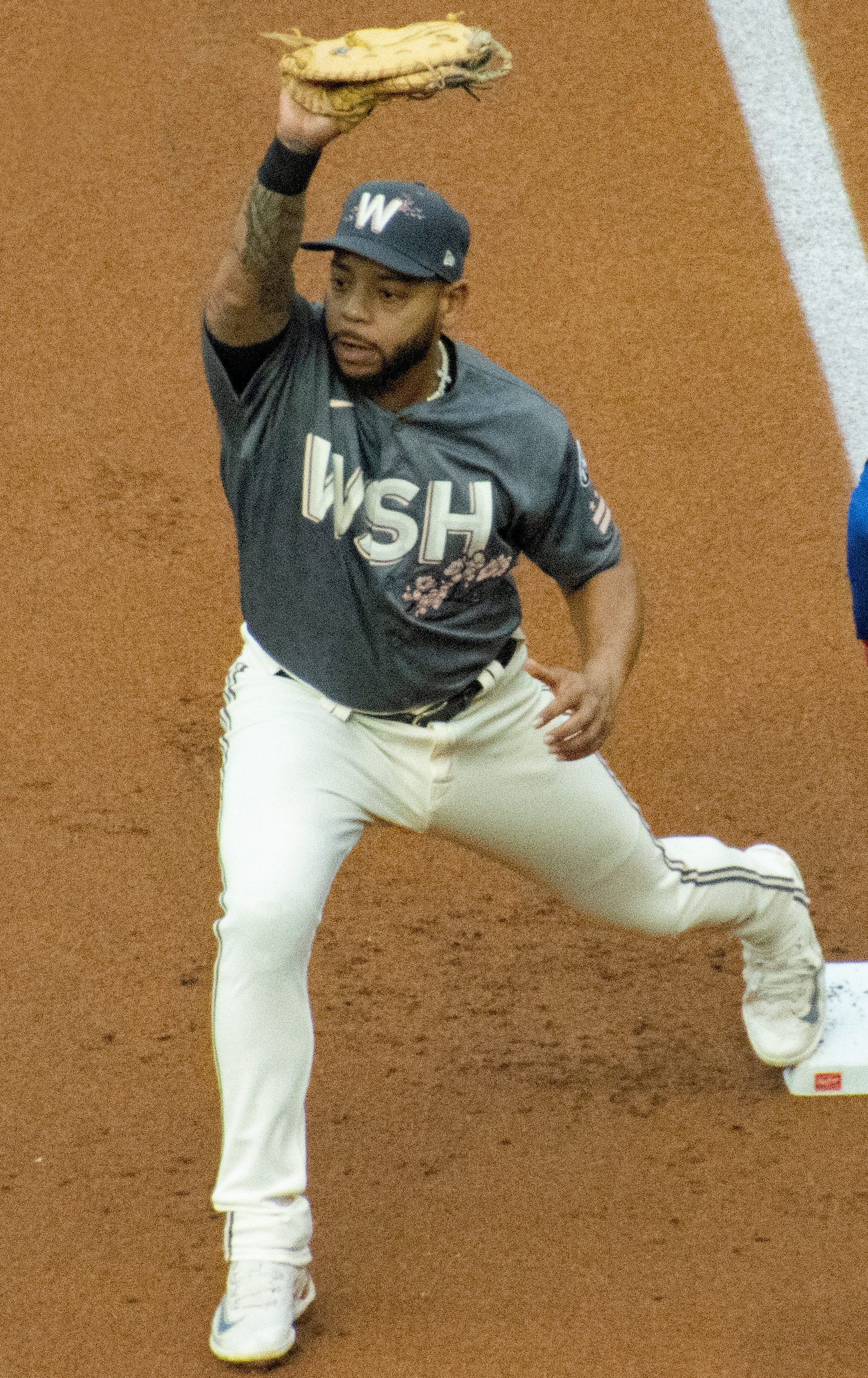
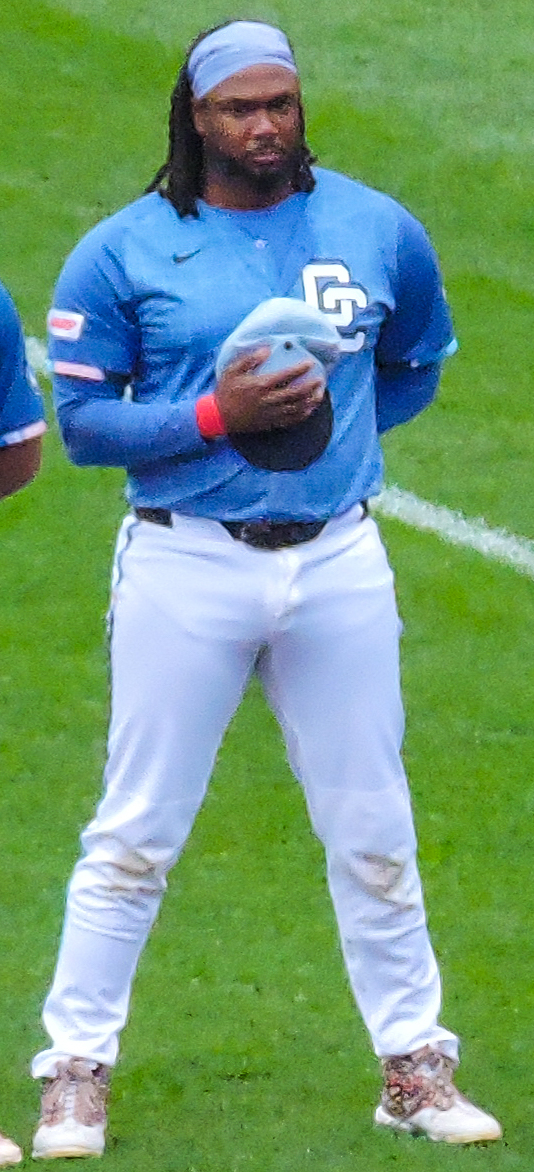
Dominic Smith (left) in the cherry blossom-inspired "City Connect" gray uniform, worn from 2022 to 2024; Josh Bell (right) in the map-inspired "City Connect" light blue uniform, worn since 2025.

=== Stars and Stripes alternates ===
In 2009, the Nationals unveiled a navy alternate uniform for games that fell during Independence Day week. The uniform featured the "interlocking DC" logo rendered in the Stars and Stripes motif, along with white/red piping and white numbers with gold bevels and red trim. The original primary logo was added to the left sleeve, and a navy cap with red brim containing the aforementioned "DC flag" logo was used.

In 2011, the uniform was tweaked to feature the "curly W" in Stars and Stripes, along with updated logos and the removal of gold accents. The road navy cap was originally used with this uniform, but in 2016 it was replaced by a similar design, with the exception of the "curly W" which was now rendered in the Stars and Stripes. This design was used until 2019, during which the uniform was no longer exclusively worn on Independence Day week.

In 2017 a white version of the "Stars and Stripes" alternate was released; this one is paired with the navy-brimmed red cap featuring the "curly W" in Stars and Stripes.

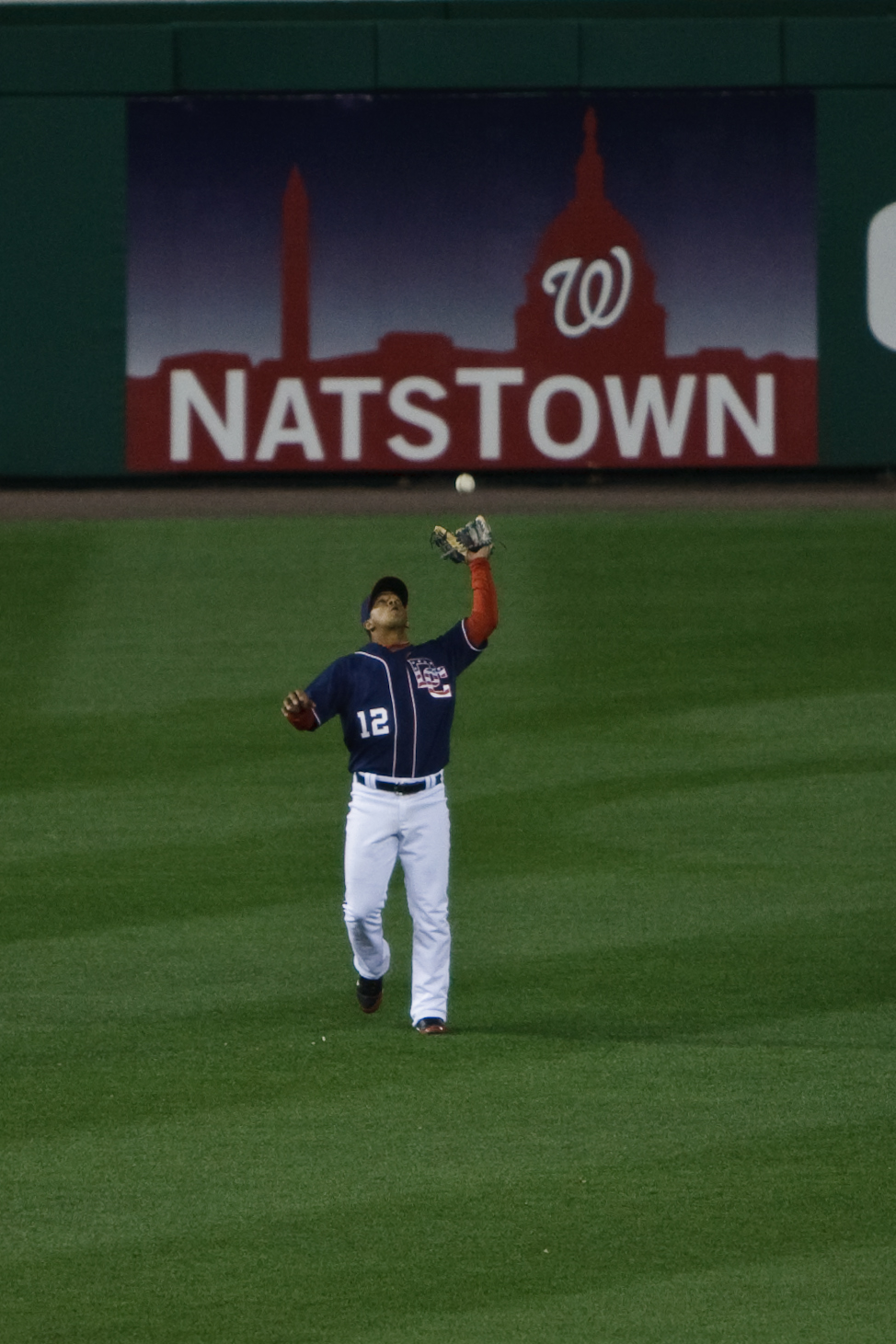
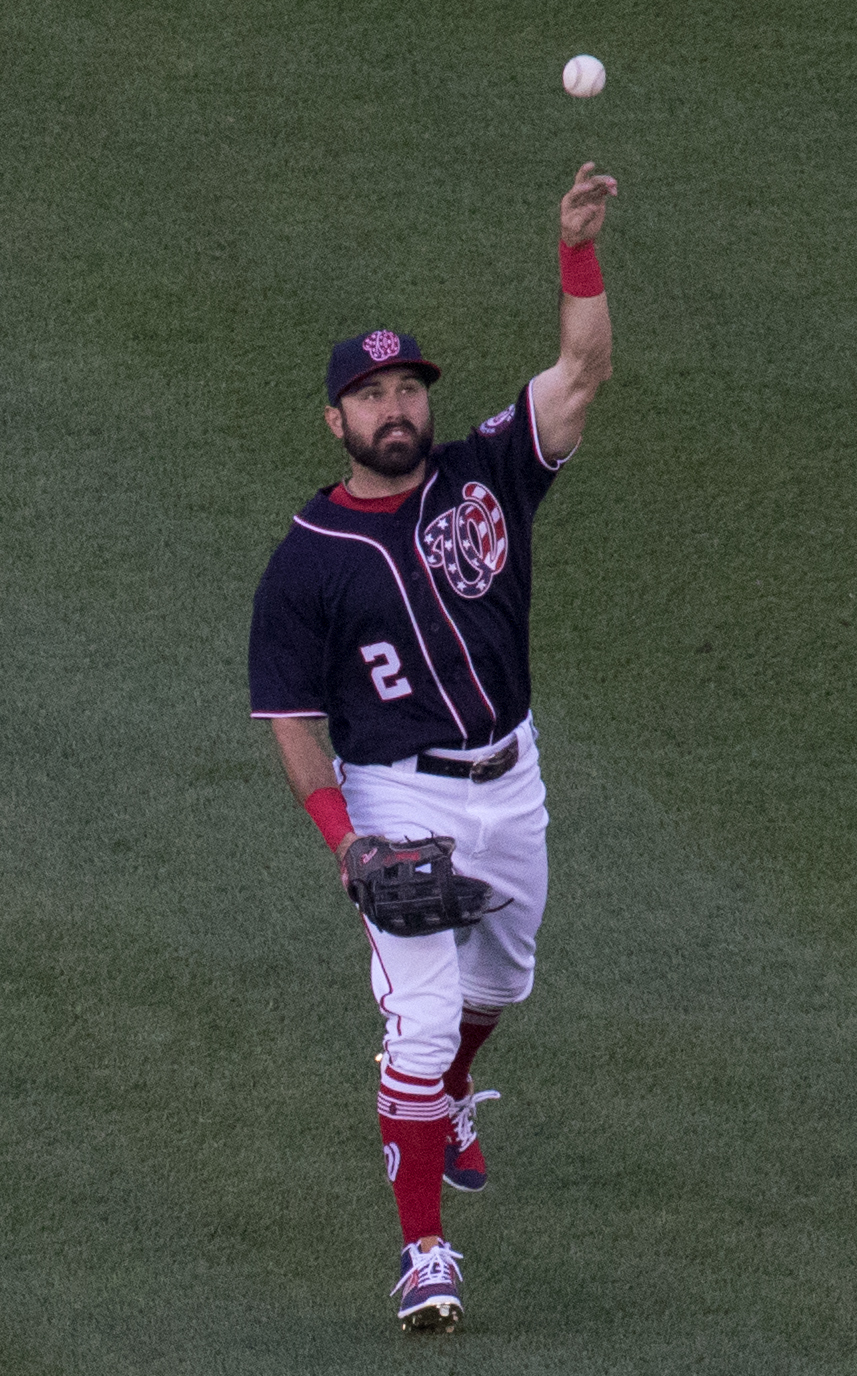
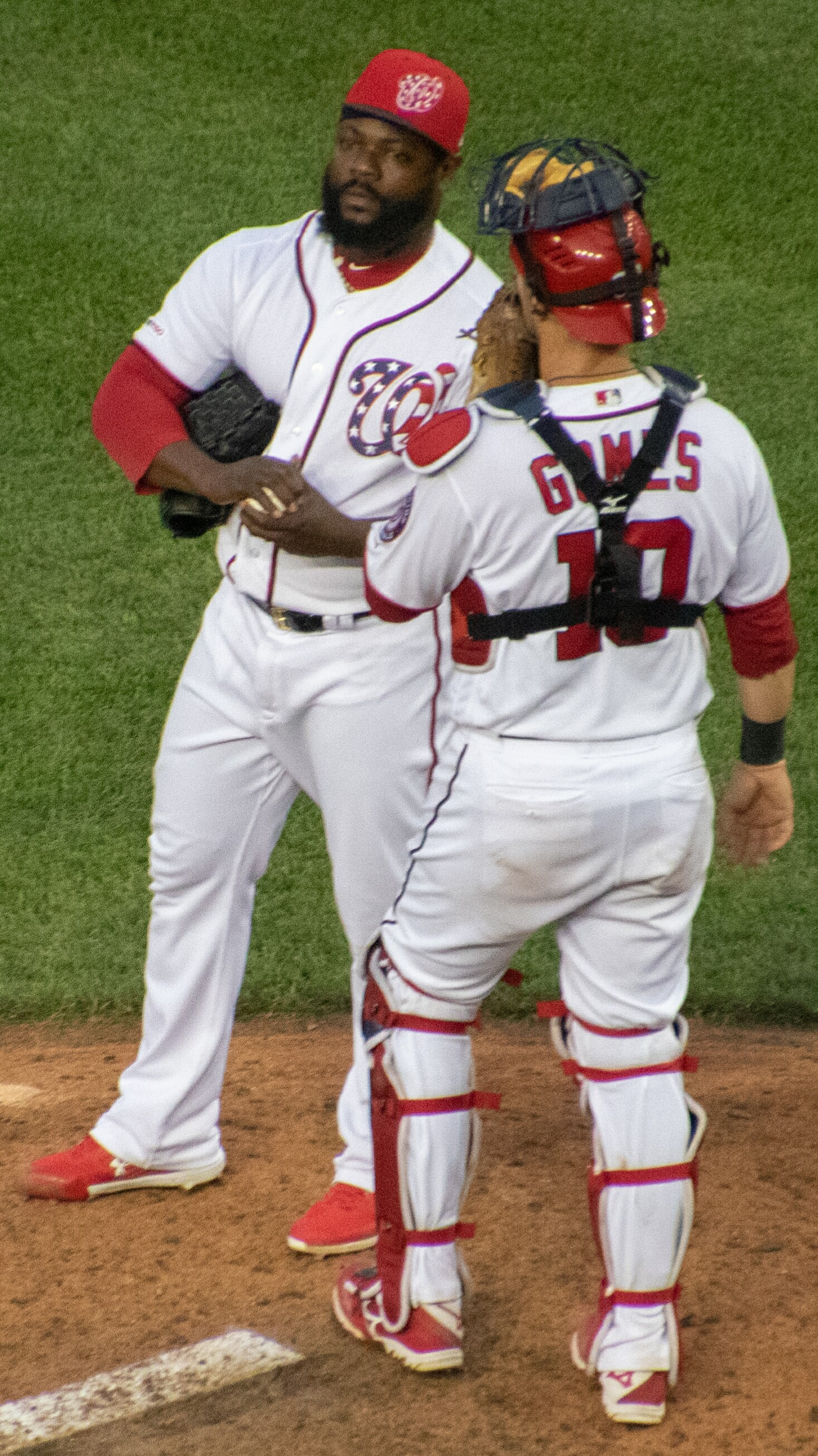
Alberto González (left) in the original "DC Stars and Stripes" uniform; Adam Eaton (center) in the navy "W Stars and Stripes" uniform; Fernando Rodney and Yan Gomes (right) in the white "W Stars and Stripes" uniform.

== Season standings ==
MLB season	Team season	League	Division	Regular season					Postseason	Awards
MLB season	Team season	League	Division	Finish	Wins	Losses	Win%	GB	Postseason	Awards
2005	2005	NL	East	5th	81	81	.500	9	—	Chad Cordero—Rolaids Relief Man
2006	2006	NL	East	5th	71	91	.438	26	—	Alfonso Soriano—Silver Slugger
2007	2007	NL	East	4th	73	89	.451	18	—	Dmitri Young—Players Choice Award National League Comeback Player
2008	2008	NL	East	5th	59	102	.366	32½	—	—
2009	2009	NL	East	5th	59	103	.364	34	—	Ryan Zimmerman—Gold Glove and Silver Slugger
2010	2010	NL	East	5th	69	93	.426	28	—	Ryan Zimmerman—Silver Slugger
2011	2011	NL	East	3rd	80	81	.497	21½	—	—
2012	**2012**	NL	East	1st	98	64	.605	—	Won NL East Division by 4 games; Lost NLDS 3–2 vs. Cardinals	Adam LaRoche—Silver Slugger and Gold Glove; Ian Desmond—Silver Slugger; Stephen Strasburg—Silver Slugger; Bryce Harper—National League Rookie of the Year; Davey Johnson—National League Manager of the Year
2013	2013	NL	East	2nd	86	76	.531	10	—	Ian Desmond—Silver Slugger
2014	**2014**	NL	East	1st	96	66	.593	—	Won NL East Division by 17 games; Lost NLDS 3–1 vs. Giants	Ian Desmond—Silver Slugger; Anthony Rendon—Silver Slugger; Wilson Ramos—Tony Conigliaro Award; Matt Williams—National League Manager of the Year
2015	2015	NL	East	2nd	83	79	.512	7	—	Bryce Harper—National League Most Valuable Player, Silver Slugger, Hank Aaron Award, Players Choice Award National League Outstanding Player, Esurance MLB Awards for Best Major Leaguer and Best Everyday Player
2016	**2016**	NL	East	1st	95	67	.586	—	Won NL East Division by 8 games; Lost NLDS 3–2 vs. Dodgers	Daniel Murphy—Silver Slugger and Players Choice Award National League Outstanding Player; Wilson Ramos—Silver Slugger; Max Scherzer— National League Cy Young Award, Esurance MLB Awards for Best Pitcher and Best Performance; Anthony Rendon—National League Comeback Player of the Year
2017	**2017**	NL	East	1st	97	65	.599	—	Won NL East Division by 20 games; Lost NLDS 3–2 vs. Cubs	Daniel Murphy—Silver Slugger; Max Scherzer—National League Cy Young Award, Players Choice Award National League Outstanding Pitcher; Ryan Zimmerman—Players Choice Award National League Comeback Player
2018	2018	NL	East	2nd	82	80	.506	8	—	—
2019	**2019**	NL	East	2nd	93	69	.574	4	Won NLWCG 4–3 vs. Brewers; Won NLDS 3–2 vs. Dodgers; Won NLCS 4–0 vs. Cardinals; **Won World Series 4–3 vs. Astros**	Howie Kendrick—National League Championship Series Most Valuable Player Award; Anthony Rendon—Silver Slugger and All-MLB 1st Team; Max Scherzer—All-MLB 1st Team; Juan Soto—All-MLB 2nd Team; Stephen Strasburg—All-MLB 1st Team and World Series Most Valuable Player Award
2020	2020	NL	East	4th	26	34	.433	9	—	Juan Soto—All-MLB 1st Team, Silver Slugger and Batting Title
2021	2021	NL	East	5th	65	97	.401	23½	—	Juan Soto—All-MLB 1st Team and Silver Slugger
2022	2022	NL	East	5th	55	107	.340	46	—	—
2023	2023	NL	East	5th	71	91	.438	33	—	—
2024	2024	NL	East	4th	71	91	.438	24	—	—
2025	2025	NL	East	5th	66	96	.407	30	—	—
2026	2026	NL	East	4th	77	85	.475	17	—	—

Bold denotes a playoff season, pennant, or championship; italics denote an active season.

=== Postseason appearances ===
Year	Wild Card Game		NLDS		NLCS		World Series	
1981^{[A]}	None^{[C]}		Philadelphia Phillies	**W** (3–2)	Los Angeles Dodgers	L (3–2)		
2012^{[B]}	Bye (Won NL East)		St. Louis Cardinals	L (3–2)				
2014	Bye (Won NL East)		San Francisco Giants	L (3–1)				
2016	Bye (Won NL East)		Los Angeles Dodgers	L (3–2)				
2017	Bye (Won NL East)		Chicago Cubs	L (3–2)				
2019	Milwaukee Brewers	**W**	Los Angeles Dodgers	**W** (3–2)	St. Louis Cardinals	**W** (4–0)	Houston Astros	**W** (4–3)

1. ^{↑}Appeared as the Montreal Expos.
2. ^{↑}This and subsequent appearances as the Washington Nationals.
3. ^{↑}The wild-card game was first played in 2012.

== Players and personnel ==
=== Roster ===
Washington Nationals 2027 spring training roster
40-man roster		Non-roster invitees	Coaches / other
**Pitchers**: -- Philip Abner; 54 Andrew Alvarez; 39 Clayton Beeter; 17 Jake Bird; 24 Cade Cavalli; 74 Riley Cornelio; 48 Yovanny Cruz; 76 Will Dion; 19 Connelly Early; 77 DJ Herz; 27 Jake Irvin; 25 Jackson Kent; 41 Brad Lord; 43 Luis Perales; 64 Orlando Ribalta; -- Alejandro Rosario; -- Reiver Sanmartín; 72 Jared Simpson; 49 Jack Sinclair; -- Jarlín Susana; -- Travis Sykora; 73 Erik Tolman; 55 Matt Waldron; 46 Eddy Yean	**Catchers**: 17 Harry Ford; 14 Drew Millas; 20 Keibert Ruiz; **Infielders**: 5 CJ Abrams; 87 Andrés Chaparro; -- Nate Furman; 12 Brady House; 28 Yohandy Morales; 26 Nasim Nuñez; 81 Abimelec Ortiz; 84 Jorbit Vivas; **Outfielders**: 3 Dylan Crews; 4 Daylen Lile; 45 Andrew Pinckney; 29 James Wood; 30 Jacob Young	**Pitchers**: -- Omar Cruz; **Infielders**: -- Carlos Mendoza	**Manager**: 10 Blake Butera; **Coaches**: 83 Grant Anders (development); 60 Andrew Aydt (assistant hitting); 62 Matt Borgschulte (hitting); 63 Sean Doolittle (assistant pitching); 7 Víctor Estévez (third base/infield); 9 Michael Johns (bench); 68 Dustin Glant (assistant pitching/bullpen); 53 Simon Mathews (pitching); 67 Shawn O'Malley (assistant hitting); 23 Corey Ray (first base/outfield); 88 Bobby Wilson (catching/run game); 40 active, 0 inactive, 2 non-roster invitees; 7-, 10-, or 15-day injured list; * Not on active roster; ^{†} Suspended list; Roster, coaches, and NRIs updated November 18, 2026; Transactions • Depth chart; → All MLB rosters

=== Managers ===
Manager	Tenure	Regular season				Postseason						Totals		
Manager	Tenure	Wins	Losses	Win %	Best finish	Appearances	Wins	Losses	Win %	Wild Card record	Series record	Wins	Losses	Win %
Frank Robinson	2005–2006	152	172	.469	81–81, 5th (2005)	—	—	—	—	—	—	152	172	.469
Manny Acta	2007–2009	158	252	.385	73–89, 4th (2007)	—	—	—	—	—	—	158	252	.385
Jim Riggleman	2009–2011	140	172	.449	69–93, 5th (2010) (Note: During 2011, Riggleman and McLaren combined with Davey Johnson for an 80–81 (.497), third-place finish. Riggleman′s record in 2011 was 38–37 (.507), McLaren′s was 2–1 (.667), and Johnson′s was 40–43 (.482).)	—	—	—	—	—	—	140	172	.449
John McLaren (interim)	2011	2	1	.667	—	—	—	—	—	—	—	2	1	.667
Davey Johnson	2011–2013	224	183	.550	98–64, 1st (2012)	2012	2	3	.400	—	0–1	226	186	.549
Matt Williams	2014–2015	179	145	.552	96–66, 1st (2014)	2014	1	3	.250	—	0–1	180	148	.549
Dusty Baker	2016–2017	192	132	.593	97–65, 1st (2017)	2016, 2017	4	6	.400	—	0–2	196	138	.587
Dave Martinez	2018–2025	500	622	.446	93–69, 2nd (2019)	2019	12	5	.706	1–0	3–0	512	627	.450
Miguel Cairo (interim)	2025	29	43	.403	—	—	—	—	—	—	—	29	43	.403
Blake Butera	2026–present	77	85	.475	77–85, 4th (2026)	—	—	—	—	—	—	77	85	.475

=== Baseball Hall of Famers ===
Washington Nationals Hall of Famers
Affiliation according to the National Baseball Hall of Fame and Museum
Montreal Expos

**Gary Carter** *
**Andre Dawson** *

Vladimir Guerrero *
Randy Johnson

Pedro Martínez
Tony Pérez

**Tim Raines** *
Lee Smith

Larry Walker
Dick Williams *

Washington Nationals

Frank Robinson

Iván Rodríguez

- Players and managers listed in **bold** are depicted on their Hall of Fame plaques wearing a Expos or Nationals cap insignia.
- * Montreal Expos or Washington Nationals listed as primary team according to the Hall of Fame

=== Ford C. Frick Award ===
Washington Nationals Ford C. Frick Award recipients
Affiliation according to the National Baseball Hall of Fame and Museum

**Dave Van Horne**

- **Names in bold** received the award based primarily on their work as broadcasters for the Expos or Nationals.

=== Retired numbers ===
**Ryan**; **Zimmerman**; 3B/1B; Retired 2022	**Jackie**; **Robinson**; 2B; Retired 1997

During the franchise's period in Montreal, the Montreal Expos retired three numbers in honor of four players, plus Jackie Robinson's number 42 which was retired throughout all Major League Baseball in 1997. Following the move to Washington, D.C., the numbers (except 42) were returned to circulation and remain in use as of 2023. When Washington wore Expos throwback jerseys on July 6, 2019, catcher Yan Gomes wore his usual number 10, even though the number was retired by the Expos for Andre Dawson and Rusty Staub.

After the Expos' departure from Montreal, the National Hockey League′s Montreal Canadiens hung a banner in Bell Centre honoring the Expos' retired numbers.

The Nationals retired Ryan Zimmerman's No. 11 on June 18, 2022, the first number retired by the Nationals.

=== Ring of Honor ===
On August 10, 2010, the Nationals unveiled a "Ring of Honor" (Note: The Ring of Honor should not be confused with the Washington Hall of Stars.) at Nationals Park to honor National Baseball Hall of Fame members who had played "significant years" for the Washington Nationals, original Washington Senators (1901–1960), expansion Washington Senators (1961–1971), Homestead Grays, or Montreal Expos. While the Ring of Honor inducted a handful of Grays, they have only inducted one class (forgetting Smokey Joe Williams, a fellow Hall of Famer who played for the Grays) in 2010, not inducting any further Gray since. In late August 2016, the team dropped the criterion that an inductee be a member of the National Baseball Hall of Fame, also opening membership to "anyone who has made a significant contribution to the game of baseball in Washington, D.C."; the first inductee under the revised criteria was Frank Howard.

The Nationals′ attempt to honor the Montreal-Washington franchise's entire history in the Ring of Honor, as well as by tracking Montreal-Washington franchise records, is not without controversy; it has been criticized as "an embodiment of the team's desire to find history before it can make much." Although Nationals fans generally take little interest in the franchise's Montreal years, some do appreciate acknowledging that the franchise has a history that predates its arrival in Washington, and former Expo Tim Raines received a warm round of applause from fans at Nationals Park at his induction ceremony on August 28, 2017, even though he had never even visited Washington, D.C., before, and the closest baseball he played in the market was one game for Baltimore with his son at the end of 2001. Some Montreal Expos fans express appreciation that the Nationals are honoring the Expos, and Expos players inducted into the Ring of Honor have expressed gratitude that the Nationals chose to include them, especially with no MLB team in Montreal to honor their careers. However, few Nationals fans have taken an interest in franchise records, preferring to compare Nationals records with those of previous Washington MLB teams instead, and a segment of Nationals fans actively opposes the inclusion of Expos history into that of the Nationals, taking the view that the Montreal years are irrelevant to Washington and that the team made a complete break with its past and started anew when it arrived in Washington, inheriting the history of the two Washington Senators teams rather than that of the Expos. Similarly, Montreal Expos fans have taken very little or no interest in the achievements of Nationals players, and many Expos fans strongly oppose the inclusion of former Expos in the Ring, taking the position that to do so is to co-opt the history of the Expos, which they say belongs solely in Montreal.

Observers also have noted that the admission of the first Nationals player to the Ring of Honor, Iván "Pudge" Rodríguez, although he was well-liked as a National, highlights another awkward aspect of the Ring of Honor's acceptance criteria, because Rodriguez's inclusion arose out of his admission to the National Baseball Hall of Fame based on his exploits for other teams, not out of anything he did during a 155-game, two-season stint with the Nationals at the end of his career in years in which the Nationals posted mediocre records. Nationals general manager Mike Rizzo responded that his inclusion had merit even based on his time with the Nationals, when he "taught us how to be a professional franchise."

In a ceremony held at Nationals Park between games of a doubleheader on the evening of September 8, 2018, the Nationals inducted former outfielder Jayson Werth, who played for the Nationals from 2011 through 2017, into the Ring of Honor. He became the first "true" National – the first person based specifically on his career as a National – inducted into the Ring of Honor.

In honor of the 20th anniversary season of Washington Nationals baseball, the Nationals inducted the 2005 Washington Nationals team as a whole into the Ring of Honor in a pregame ceremony on April 5, 2025. Five members of the 2005 team — Jamey Carroll, Chad Cordero, John Patterson, Brian Schneider, and Ryan Zimmerman — took part in the ceremony.

The Ring of Honor includes:

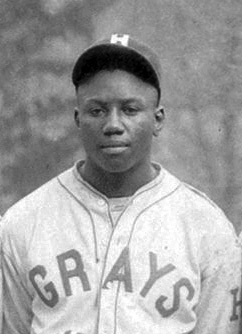
Josh Gibson, catcher

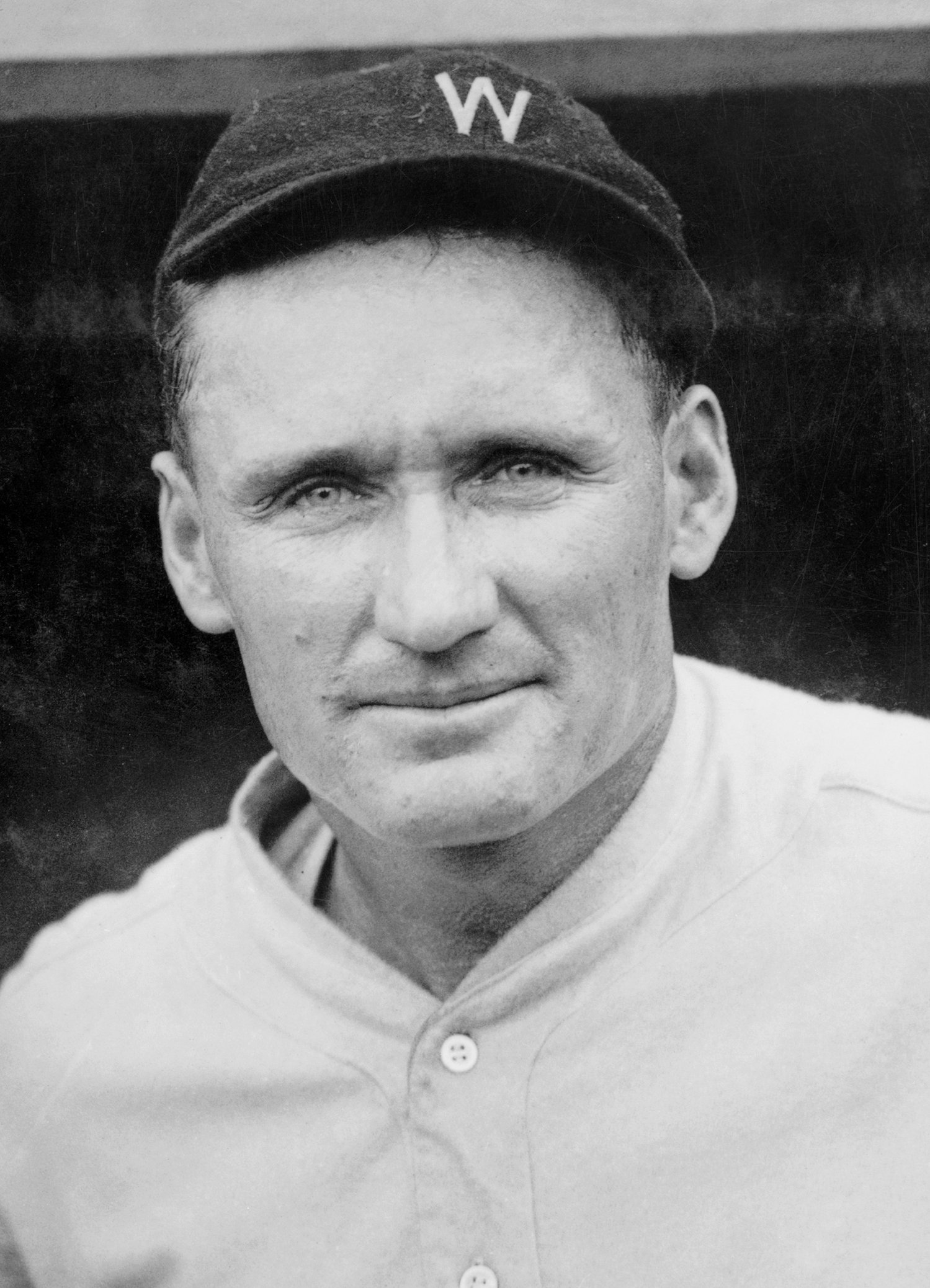
Walter Johnson, starting pitcher

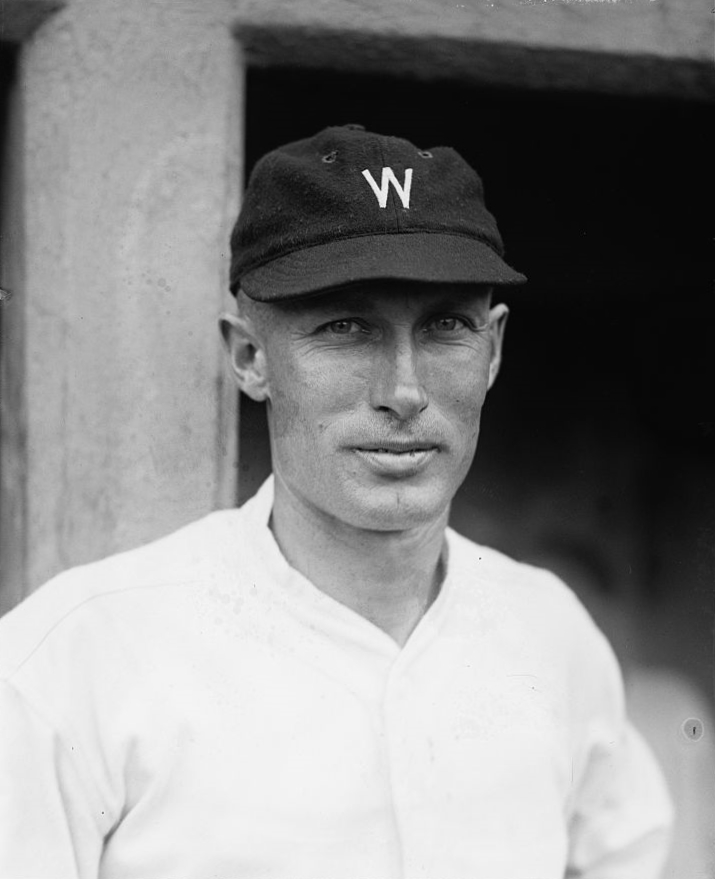
Sam Rice, outfielder

Washington Nationals Ring of Honor
Homestead Grays
No.	Inductee	Position	Tenure	Admitted
4	Cool Papa Bell	CF	1932, 1943–1946	August 10, 2010
—	Ray Brown	P	1932–1945; 1947–1948	August 10, 2010
20	Josh Gibson	C	1937–1946	August 10, 2010
32	Buck Leonard	1B	1934–1950	August 10, 2010
—	Cumberland Posey	OF/Manager/Owner/Club official	1911–1946	August 10, 2010
—	Jud Wilson	3B	1931–1932; 1940–1945	August 10, 2010
Montreal Expos
No.	Inductee	Position	Tenure	Admitted
8	Gary Carter	C	1974–1984, 1992	August 10, 2010
10	Andre Dawson	CF	1976–1986	August 10, 2010
30	Tim Raines	LF	1979–1990, 2001	August 28, 2017
20	Frank Robinson	Manager	2002–2004	May 9, 2015
Washington Nationals
No.	Inductee	Position	Tenure	Admitted
20	Frank Robinson	Manager	2005–2006	May 9, 2015
7	Iván "Pudge" Rodríguez	C	2010–2011	August 28, 2017
28	Jayson Werth	RF/LF	2011–2017	September 8, 2018
11	Ryan Zimmerman	3B/1B	2005–2019, 2021	June 18, 2022
—	Ted Lerner	Owner	2006–2023	March 30, 2023
—	2005 Washington Nationals	Entire team	2005	April 5, 2025
Washington Senators (original team, 1901–1960)
No.	Inductee	Position	Tenure	Admitted
4	Joe Cronin	SS	1928–1934	August 10, 2010
8, 10, 37	Rick Ferrell	C	1937–1941; 1944–1945, 1947	August 10, 2010
3, 5, 20	Goose Goslin	LF	1921–1930; 1933, 1938	August 10, 2010
—	Clark Griffith	P/Owner	P: 1912–1914; Owner: 1920–1955	August 10, 2010
28, 30, 35, 50	Bucky Harris	2B/Manager	2B: 1919–1928; Manager: 1924–1928, 1935–1942, 1950–1954	August 10, 2010
—	Walter Johnson	P	1907–1927	August 10, 2010
3, 12, 25	Harmon Killebrew	1B	1954–1960	August 10, 2010
2, 3	Heinie Manush	LF	1930–1935	August 10, 2010
2, 22	Sam Rice	RF	1915–1933	August 10, 2010
11, 20, 26, 44	Early Wynn	P	1939–1944; 1946–1948	August 10, 2010
Washington Senators (expansion team, 1961–1971)
No.	Inductee	Position	Tenure	Admitted
—	Bucky Harris	Scout/Special Assistant	1963–1971	August 10, 2010
9, 33	Frank Howard	LF/1B	1965–1971	August 26, 2016

== Attendance ==
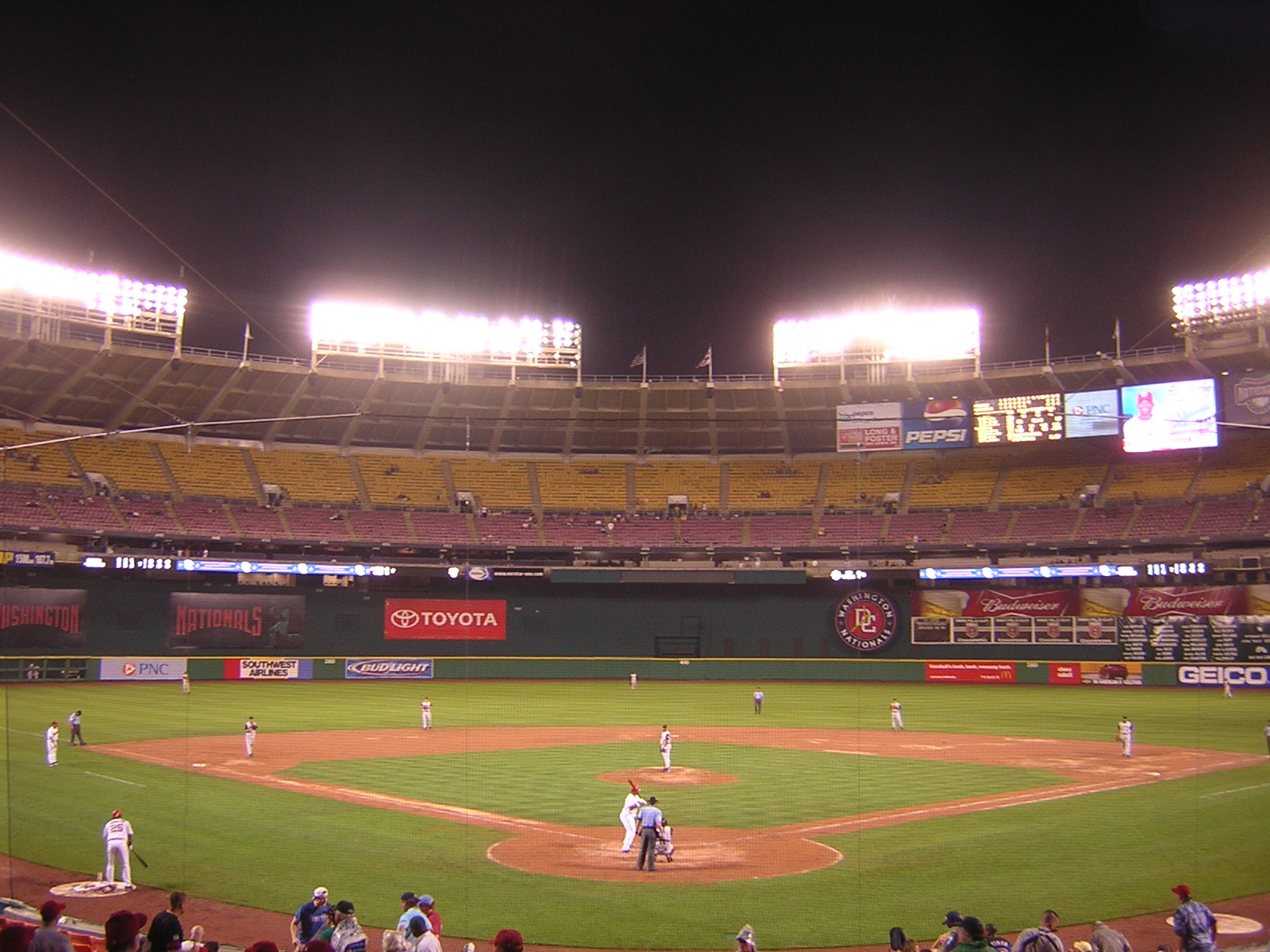
RFK Stadium

Season	Stadium	Season Total	Rank in National League	Game Average
2005	RFK Stadium	2,731,993	8th (of 16)	33,651
2006	RFK Stadium	2,153,056	11th (of 16)	26,582
2007	RFK Stadium	1,943,812	14th (of 16)	24,217
2008	Nationals Park	2,320,400	13th (of 16)	29,005
2009	Nationals Park	1,817,226	13th (of 16)	22,716
2010	Nationals Park	1,828,066	14th (of 16)	22,569
2011	Nationals Park	1,940,478	14th (of 16)	24,256
2012	Nationals Park	2,370,794	9th (of 16)	30,010
2013	Nationals Park	2,652,422	6th (of 15)	32,746
2014	Nationals Park	2,579,389	7th (of 15)	31,844
2015	Nationals Park	2,619,843	5th (of 15)	32,344
2016	Nationals Park	2,481,938	7th (of 15)	30,641
2017	Nationals Park	2,524,980	7th (of 15)	31,172
2018	Nationals Park	2,529,604	8th (of 15)	31,230
2019	Nationals Park	2,259,781	12th (of 15)	27,899
2020	Nationals Park	0 (Note: No spectators were allowed due to the COVID-19 pandemic.)	NA	0
2021	Nationals Park	1,465,543 (Note: Due to the aforementioned pandemic, Nationals Park had capacity restrictions until June 11; 5,000 from the beginning of the season to April 14, then 10,000 from April 15 to May 13, then 36% capacity (approximately 14,873) on May 14, and finally full capacity on June 11.)	12th (of 15)	18,093
2022	Nationals Park	2,026,401	11th (of 15)	25,017
2023	Nationals Park	1,865,832	13th (of 15)	23,035
2024	Nationals Park	1,967,302	13th (of 15)	24,288
2025	Nationals Park	1,916,768	13th (of 15)	23,664
2026	Nationals Park	1,839,116	13th (of 15)	22,705

== Spring training ==
The Nationals hold spring training in Florida, where they play their annual slate of Grapefruit League games. From 2005 through 2016, they held spring training at Space Coast Stadium in Viera, Florida, a facility that they inherited from the Expos. In 2017, the Nationals moved their spring training operations to the Ballpark of the Palm Beaches, a new facility they share with the Houston Astros in West Palm Beach, Florida; they played their first Grapefruit League game there on February 28, 2017. On February 16, 2018, it was renamed FITTEAM Ballpark of the Palm Beaches after the Nationals and Astros signed a 12-year deal for the naming rights to the stadium that day with FITTEAM, an event brand partnership and organic products firm located in Palm Beach Gardens, Florida. In February 2024, it was renamed CACTI Park of the Palm Beaches after the two teams agreed to a multi-year naming rights deal with American rapper and singer-songwriter Travis Scott's CACTI Hard Seltzer company.

== Minor league affiliations ==
Level	Team	League	Location	Seasons
Triple-A	Rochester Red Wings	International League	Rochester, New York	2021–present
Double-A	Harrisburg Senators	Eastern League	Harrisburg, Pennsylvania	1991–present
High-A	Wilmington Blue Rocks	South Atlantic League	Wilmington, Delaware	2021–present
Single-A	Fredericksburg Nationals	Carolina League	Fredericksburg, Virginia	2020–present*
Rookie	FCL Nationals	Florida Complex League	West Palm Beach, Florida	1969–present
Rookie	DSL Nationals	Dominican Summer League	Dominican Republic	2005–present

*: The Nationals began an affiliation with the Single-A Nationals in 2005; the then-Advanced-A Potomac Nationals moved from Woodbridge, Virginia, to Fredericksburg, Virginia, before the 2020 season, and moved to Single-A play in the 2021 season.

=== Former affiliates ===
Level	League	Team (Seasons)
Triple-A	American Association	Indianapolis Indians (1984–1992); Wichita Aeros (1982–1983); Denver Bears (1976–1981)
Triple-A	International League	Syracuse Chiefs (2009–2018); Columbus Clippers (2007–2008); Ottawa Lynx (1993–2002); Memphis Blues (1974–1975); Peninsula Whips (1972–1973); Winnipeg Whips (1970–1971); Buffalo Bisons (1970)
Triple-A	Pacific Coast League	Fresno Grizzlies (2019–2020); New Orleans Zephyrs (2005–2006); Edmonton Trappers (2003–2004); Vancouver Mounties (1969)
Double-A	Eastern League	Quebec Metros (1976–1977); Quebec Carnavals (1971–1975)
Double-A	Southern League	Memphis Chicks (1978–1983); Jacksonville Suns (1970, 1984–1990)
Class A-Advanced	California League	San Jose Expos (1982)
Class A-Advanced	Carolina League	Potomac Nationals (2005–2019); Kinston Expos (1974)
Class A-Advanced	Florida State League	Brevard County Manatees (2002–2004); Jupiter Hammerheads (1998–2001); West Palm Beach Expos (1969–1997)
Class A	Midwest League	Clinton LumberKings (2001–2002); Burlington Bees (1993–1994); Rockford Expos (1988–1992); Burlington Expos (1986–1987)
Class A	South Atlantic League	Hagerstown Suns (2007–2020); Savannah Sand Gnats (2003–2006); Cape Fear Crocs (1997–2000); Delmarva Shorebirds (1996); Albany Polecats (1992, 1995); Sumter Flyers (1991); Gastonia Expos (1983–1984)
Class A Short Season	New York–Penn League	Auburn Doubledays (2011–2020); Vermont Expos/Lake Monsters (1994–2010); Jamestown Falcons/Expos (1973, 1977–1993)
Class A Short Season	Northern League	Watertown Expos (1970–1971)
Rookie Advanced	Pioneer League	Calgary Expos (1979–1984); Lethbridge Expos (1975–1976)

== Nationals Philanthropies ==
The Nationals Philanthropies, formerly the Nationals Dream Foundation, is the team's charitable arm which is committed to community partnerships that improve the lives of children and families across the Washington Capital Region. The foundation opened a youth baseball academy in partnership with the D.C. government, and a pediatric diabetes care center at Children's National Medical Center in partnership with the center. The foundation also provides grants to local organizations.

On August 1, 2011, the foundation, in partnership with several local organizations, formally opened Miracle Field in Germantown, Maryland, as part of an effort to encourage athletic activity in children with "mental and/or physical challenges". According to Steven Miller of MLB.com, what sets Miracle Field apart in terms of safety is its unique design, as it "is made entirely of a cushioned synthetic turf that is five-eighths of an inch thick—providing a safe surface for children in wheelchairs or with other handicaps."

== Radio and television ==
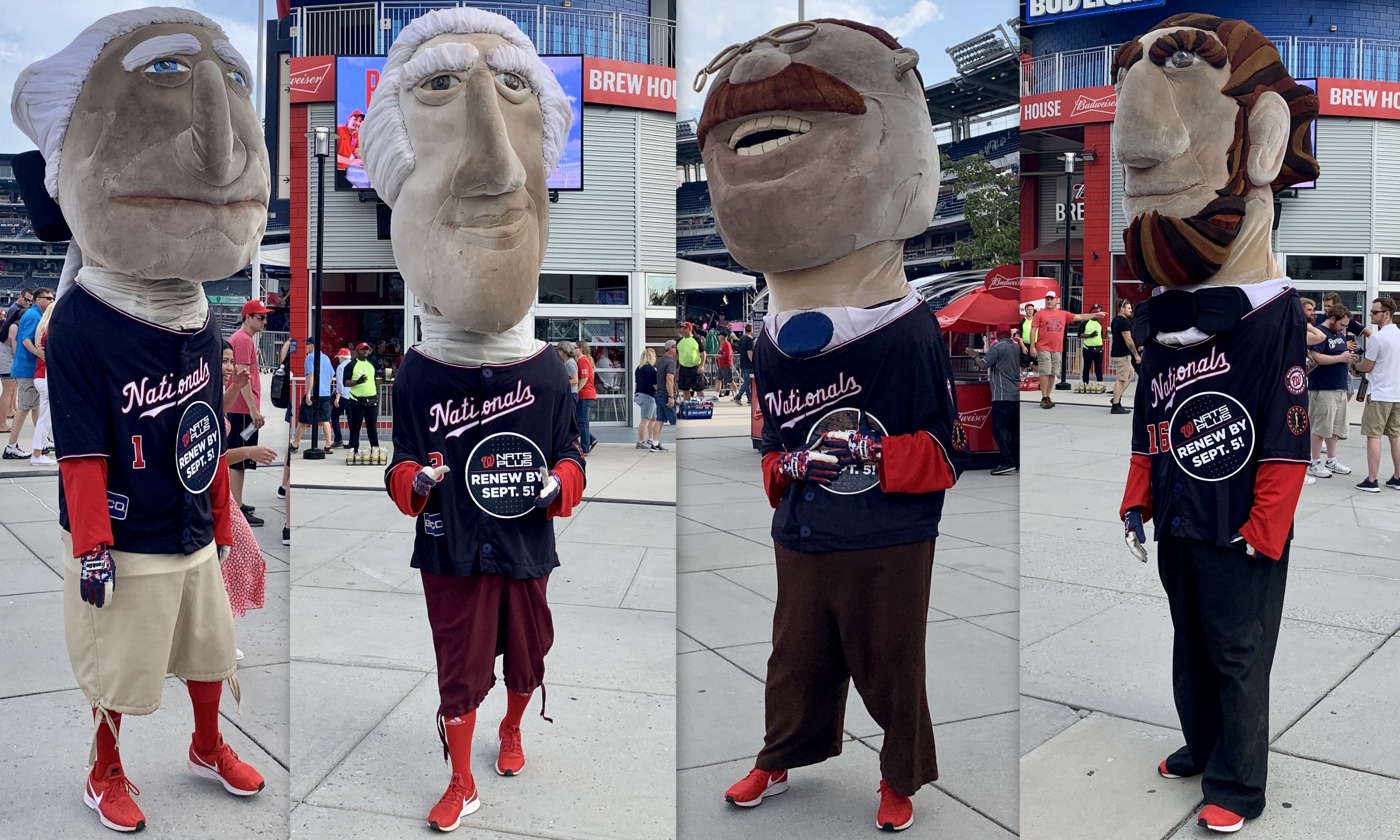
Mascots dressed as George Washington, Thomas Jefferson, Theodore Roosevelt and Abraham Lincoln before a 2019 game against the Milwaukee Brewers. They compete in the Presidents Race every mid-fourth inning of a home game.

The Nationals' flagship radio station is WJFK-FM (106.7 FM) "The Fan", which is owned by Entercom. Charlie Slowes and Dave Jageler are the play-by-play announcers. WJFK fronts a radio network of 19 stations serving portions of Virginia, Maryland, West Virginia, North Carolina, and Delaware as well as the District.

Nationals television broadcasts are produced and distributed by MLB Local Media (branded "Nationals.TV") under a partnership between the team and Major League Baseball. Nationals.TV is carried as a linear channel by in-territory cable and satellite providers, or can be purchased as an over-the-top streaming offering. Games are called by play-by-play announcer Dan Kolko and analyst Kevin Frandsen, with Alexa Datt as studio host and reporter. In the 2026 season, ten games are simulcast on Fox affiliate WTTG (channel 5) and additional stations throughout Virginia and North Carolina.

=== Historical ===
WWZZ (104.1 FM), which carried games in the 2005 season, was the team's first flagship radio station.

WFED (1500 AM) had been the flagship station since the 2006 season until a multi-year agreement was reached between the Nationals and WJFK before the 2011 season. WFED remains on the network as an affiliate; its 50 kilowatt clear-channel signal allows the Nationals' home-team call to be heard up and down the East Coast.

On television, WDCA (channel 20) carried 76 games in the 2005 season. Otherwise, from 2005 through 2025, Mid-Atlantic Sports Network (MASN) televised all games not picked up by one of MLB's national television partners. From 2009 through 2017, MASN syndicated a package of 20 games for simulcast on an over-the-air television station in Washington. Broadcast partners under this arrangement were WDCW (channel 50) from 2009 through 2012 and CBS affiliate WUSA (channel 9) from 2013 through 2017. MASN did not continue the syndication deal for the 2018 season.

The 2005 deal assigning the Nationals' television rights to the Baltimore Orioles-controlled MASN was demanded by then-Orioles owner Peter Angelos as compensation for sharing the Washington–Baltimore market with another team. While the Nationals received a rights fee from MASN, they were tied to the channel under the agreement and could not sell their television rights on the open market, and they were locked into a minority share of ownership. This led to significant acrimony between the two teams and eventual legal action over how much in rights fees the Nationals were owed. The Lerners pointed to the agreement as a complication in selling the team, as the impossibility of valuing the rights and the lack of control over them made the team unattractive to potential buyers. The 2024 sale of the Orioles to David Rubenstein led to a softening of relations, and just before the beginning of the 2025 season, both teams and MLB announced the litigation had been settled and the agreement dissolved. As part of the resolution, the Nationals and MASN signed a new one-year contract for 2025. The Nationals then entered into a partnership deal with MLB to create Nationals.TV in 2026, officially dissolving their ties to MASN.

Mel Proctor was the TV play-by-play announcer in 2005, followed by Bob Carpenter, who held the role from 2006 through 2025. Nationals color analysts over the years have included Ron Darling (2005), Tom Paciorek (2006), Don Sutton (2007–2008), and Rob Dibble, who took over the job in 2009 and was fired in September 2010 after criticizing Stephen Strasburg for not pitching while injured. Ray Knight filled in as color analyst in September 2010 after Dibble was fired. F. P. Santangelo then served as the primary color analyst between 2011 and 2021. Kevin Frandsen was hired in January 2022 as color analyst.

==== Ratings ====
In the midst of a season in which they finished with the worst record in Major League Baseball, the Nationals' television ratings were among the worst in the National League in July 2008 but increased during the 2010 and 2011 seasons. Since 2012, when they began to achieve consistent success on the field, their television viewership has grown continually and dramatically. By 2016, the Nationals′ prime-time television ratings were 15th highest among the 29 U.S. MLB teams, and they rose to 12th in 2017. Ratings declined to 18th among the 29 U.S. teams for the 2018 season.

=== Broadcasters ===
- Charlie Slowes – radio (2005–present)
- Dave Shea – radio (2005)
- Dave Jageler – radio (2006–present)
- Mel Proctor – TV (2005)
- Ron Darling – TV (2005)
- Bob Carpenter – TV (2006–2025)
- Dan Kolko - TV (2015–present)
- Tom Paciorek – TV (2006)
- Don Sutton – TV (2007–2008)
- Rob Dibble – TV (2009–2010)
- F. P. Santangelo – TV (2011–2021)
- Kevin Frandsen – TV (2022–present)
- Ryan Zimmerman – TV (2022–present)

== Rivalries ==
=== Baltimore Orioles ===
The Nationals have an interleague rivalry, nicknamed the Beltway Series, with the nearby Baltimore Orioles. The teams have played two series a season—one in Baltimore and one in Washington—since 2006. The Nationals and Orioles rivalry is one of the few that can be played in a World Series.

=== Philadelphia Phillies ===
The Nationals' rivalry with the Philadelphia Phillies originated during their original tenure as the Montreal Expos. The two teams repeatedly battled for control of the division in the early 1980s and mid 1990s. Following the franchise's relocation to Washington, D.C., in 2005, the rivalry increased in geographic tension due to Washington's proximity to Philadelphia. The rivalry quickly spiked in intensity during the 2010s after Nationals team management introduced a campaign to block Phillies fans from overtaking home games. In 2019, star-outfielder Bryce Harper further fueled tensions after signing a 13-year, $330 million contract with the Phillies as a free agent. The Nationals later won the 2019 World Series during the first year after Harper's departure.

=== New York Mets ===
The rivalry between the New York Mets and the Nationals started forming after the Nationals relocated to Washington D.C. in 2005, developing further in the 2010s when both teams regularly fought for the NL East. One key year in this rivalry was 2016, which featured a NL East race, series sweeps, and memorable individual performances. By 2022, games became more heated, a development attributed to hit-by-pitches and bench-clearing moments.

== See also ==
- Sports in Washington, D.C.

== Notes ==
Awards and achievements
Preceded by Boston Red Sox; 2018	World Series champions 2019	Succeeded by Los Angeles Dodgers; 2020
Preceded by Los Angeles Dodgers; 2017–2018	National League champions 2019	Succeeded by Los Angeles Dodgers; 2020
