= Anirudh Kilambi =

American baseball executive (born 1994)

Washington Nationals
- General manager
- Born: January 1994 (age 32); Cupertino, California

Teams
- Tampa Bay Rays (2015–2021); Philadelphia Phillies (2021–2025); Washington Nationals (2025–present)

Anirudh Kilambi (born January 1994) is an Indian American professional baseball executive who currently serves as general manager of the Washington Nationals of Major League Baseball (MLB). Kilambi is the second highest-ranking Nationals baseball executive, under President of Baseball Operations Paul Toboni. He became one of the youngest general managers in MLB history in December 2025, when Toboni hired him.

Kilambi previously worked in the Tampa Bay Rays and Philadelphia Phillies organizations.

== Early life and education ==
Kilambi's parents emigrated from India to the San Francisco Bay Area in the early 1990s. Kilambi grew up in Cupertino, California. Taking after his father Krishna, Kilambi became a baseball fan from an early age, often attending San Francisco Giants and Oakland Athletics games. As a teenager, Kilambi developed his own system, which he named the Baseball Empirical Analysis System, or BEAnS, for evaluating players and contracts using Microsoft Excel. Using hundreds of spreadsheets, he tracked player data and statistics, a hobby that he maintained throughout college.

Kilambi graduated from the University of California, Berkeley in 2016 with a double major in statistics and operations research and management science. He overlapped for a year at Berkeley with future Nationals President of Baseball Operations Paul Toboni, although they did not know each other in college.

== Career ==
=== Tampa Bay Rays ===
While still a student at Berkeley, Kilambi was brought on as an intern for the Tampa Bay Rays, working in the Major League Baseball team's research and development department. He remained with the Rays for seven years, earning the trust of team higher-ups and growing responsibilities, and eventually worked his way up to assistant director of research and development and director of decision science. He also worked closely with Blake Butera, a Rays prospect-turned-manager who became the youngest manager in Minor League Baseball in 2018, when he was named to lead the Hudson Valley Renegades at age 25.

During Tampa Bay's 2021 season, in which they won 100 games and reached the playoffs, Kilambi was among those credited in media reports for the team's success, particularly in finding quality pitchers to replace injured players.

=== Philadelphia Phillies ===
After the 2021 season, the Philadelphia Phillies hired Kilambi as assistant general manager. Although he was just 27 at the time, Kilambi had already developed a reputation around the industry for his use of advanced analytics and ability to identify under-the-radar pitching talent. With his move to the Phillies, Kilambi also became one of the highest-ranking executives of South Asian descent in MLB.

During Kilambi's time in Philadelphia, team executives credited him with helping to improve communication and collaboration within the organization, particularly between the front office and coaching staff. In particular, he developed a tight working relationship with Phillies pitching coach Caleb Cotham.

As assistant general manager, Kilambi oversaw the Phillies' research and development department.

=== Washington Nationals ===
The Washington Nationals underwent a total renovation of their front office, player development system, and coaching staff following their disappointing 2025 season, installing Kilambi's fellow Berkeley alum Paul Toboni as President of Baseball Operations and hiring Kilambi's former Rays colleague Blake Butera as manager. After hiring away several young executives from other organizations to join the new-look organization, Toboni tapped Kilambi as general manager ahead of the 2026 season, making him his second-in-command. At age 31, Kilambi was one of the youngest people to be named a general manager in the history of MLB.
