= Jason Sinnarajah =

Canadian baseball executive

- Born: Toronto, Ontario, Canada
- Education: Boston College (B.S.) University of Virginia (MBA)
- Occupations: Professional sports and former tech executive
- Years active: 2007–present
- Spouse: Jessica Sinnarajah
- Children: 2

Jason Sinnarajah is a Canadian professional sports executive who currently serves as president of business operations for the Washington Nationals of Major League Baseball (MLB).

Sinnarajah previously worked in MLB as an executive for the Cleveland Indians from 2012 to 2015, then for the Kansas City Royals from 2023 to 2026. He also worked in the National Football League (NFL) as an executive for the Buffalo Bills from 2020 to 2023.

== Early life and education ==
Sinnarajah was born and raised in Toronto. He was a Buffalo Bills fan growing up. Sinnarajah's family moved to Bellingham, Washington, when he was in high school.

Sinnarajah earned a bachelor's degree in finance and marketing from Boston College, then went on to earn a Master of Business Administration from the University of Virginia's Darden School of Business in 2007.

== Career ==
After graduating from Darden, Sinnarajah worked for Google for five years, including stints working abroad in Australia and Japan. He made his first foray into professional sports with the Cleveland Indians of Major League Baseball (MLB) in 2012, working on strategy and business analytics. In 2015, Sinnarajah returned to the technology sector as he became vice president of global strategy and business development for The Weather Company. He moved to Ziff Davis in 2017 as senior vice president of strategy and growth.

In 2020, Sinnarajah returned to professional sports with his longtime favorite football team, the Buffalo Bills of the National Football League (NFL), serving as senior vice president of business administration from 2020 to 2023. He made the jump back from the NFL to MLB in August 2023, when he was hired by the Kansas City Royals. After parts of three seasons in Kansas City, Sinnarajah was hired as one of two Washington Nationals presidents (alongside President of Baseball Operations Paul Toboni) ahead of the 2026 season, reporting directly to team ownership as president of business operations.

In his first year in Washington, Sinnarajah was involved with the Nationals' transition from the Mid-Atlantic Sports Network to MLB Local Media for television broadcasts, as well as negotiating sponsorship deals and improving the fan experience at Nationals Park.

== Personal life ==
Sinnarajah is married to wife Jessica. The two met as first-year business students at Darden. They have two sons.
