= Paul Toboni =

American baseball executive (born 1990)

Washington Nationals
- President of Baseball Operations
- Born: San Francisco, California, U.S.

Teams
- Oakland Athletics (2013); Boston Red Sox (2015–2025); Washington Nationals (2025–present)

Paul Toboni (born February 1990) is an American professional baseball executive who is the president of baseball operations for the Washington Nationals of Major League Baseball (MLB). He previously served as senior vice president and assistant general manager of the Boston Red Sox.

== Early life and education ==
Toboni was born and raised in San Francisco, California, and attended St. Ignatius College Preparatory, where he excelled in basketball. Toboni turned down offers from the Ivy League to play basketball and baseball, and instead opted to pursue baseball only, walking on to the University of California, Berkeley baseball team in 2008. Despite undergoing two hip surgeries that limited his playing time, he was a member of the 2011 California Golden Bears baseball team that played in 2011 College World Series, playing shortstop.

He earned a B.A. in Political Economics from UC Berkeley in 2012, followed by an M.B.A. from the University of Notre Dame in 2014. While at Notre Dame, he competed for the Men's Boxing program.

== Career ==
=== Oakland Athletics ===
Toboni began his front office career with the Oakland Athletics in 2013.

=== Boston Red Sox ===
In 2015, Toboni joined the Boston Red Sox as an intern in baseball operations. In 2016, Toboni was named an Area Scout before becoming the Assistant Director, Amateur Scouting later that year. In 2020, he became the Director, Amateur Scouting. He was named Vice President, Amateur Scouting and Player Development in 2023, before being named Assistant General Manager later that year.

From 2019 to 2024, Toboni led the Red Sox’s farm system from being ranked 30th to 1st overall by Baseball America and MLB Executives. In 2024, executives across MLB voted the Red Sox as one of the best organizations at drafting, as well as developing hitters.

In October 2024, MassLive reported that Toboni was among the internal candidates considered for the Red Sox general manager position, underscoring his growing influence within the organization.

=== Washington Nationals ===
The Washington Nationals, slumping to a last-place finish in the National League East amid a difficult 2025 season, hired Toboni as the new head of their baseball operations department. They held an introductory press conference for Toboni at Nationals Park on October 1, 2025, officially naming him as president of baseball operations. Toboni became the youngest top team executive in MLB when he was hired, a distinction he held until the Athletics hired Taylor Smith as their president of baseball operations in October 2026.

As head of baseball operations, Toboni quickly moved to overhaul the Nationals' front office, player development system, and team staff. He hired 33-year-old Blake Butera as manager, making him the youngest MLB team manager in over 50 years, and 31-year-old Anirudh Kilambi as general manager, another historically young hire. He also brought over some former Red Sox colleagues, including field coordinator Andrew Wright to serve as a special assistant and scouting director Devin Pearson as assistant manager overseeing player development, and Pittsburgh Pirates scouting director Justin Horowitz as assistant general manager overseeing player acquisitions. Toboni also kept on Mike DeBartolo, who served as interim general manager during the second half of the Nationals' 2025 season, as senior vice president and assistant general manager overseeing baseball operations. The Nationals also hired Jason Sinnarajah as president of business operations, to work alongside Toboni.

Toboni's tenure with the Nationals has been marked by significant improvements in both the major- and minor-league systems in a short period of time. In his first season after taking over during the 2025–26 offseason, the Nationals' offense improved from 20th to 3rd in the league. At the minor-league level, the organization's winning percentage improved from 27th to 3rd, while its ERA improved from 19th to 1st among all organizations. The Major League team won 77 games in his first year, up from 66 the year before.

After his first year on the job, Baseball Prospectus ranked the Washington Nationals the 7th best front office in Major League Baseball, notably behind Matt Arnold (Milwaukee Brewers), Andrew Friedman (Los Angeles Dodgers) and Erik Neander (Tampa Bay Rays). The article notes, "What I can tell you is that around the baseball world, people are marveling at how quickly and wholly Toboni has righted this listing ship. And the best sure feels like it’s yet to come."

== Personal life ==
Toboni is one of five children and the brother of actress Jacqueline Toboni and 60 Minutes contributor Gianna Toboni.

Toboni and his wife Danielle have four children.
