= Juan Soto trade =

2022 and 2024 Major League Baseball trades

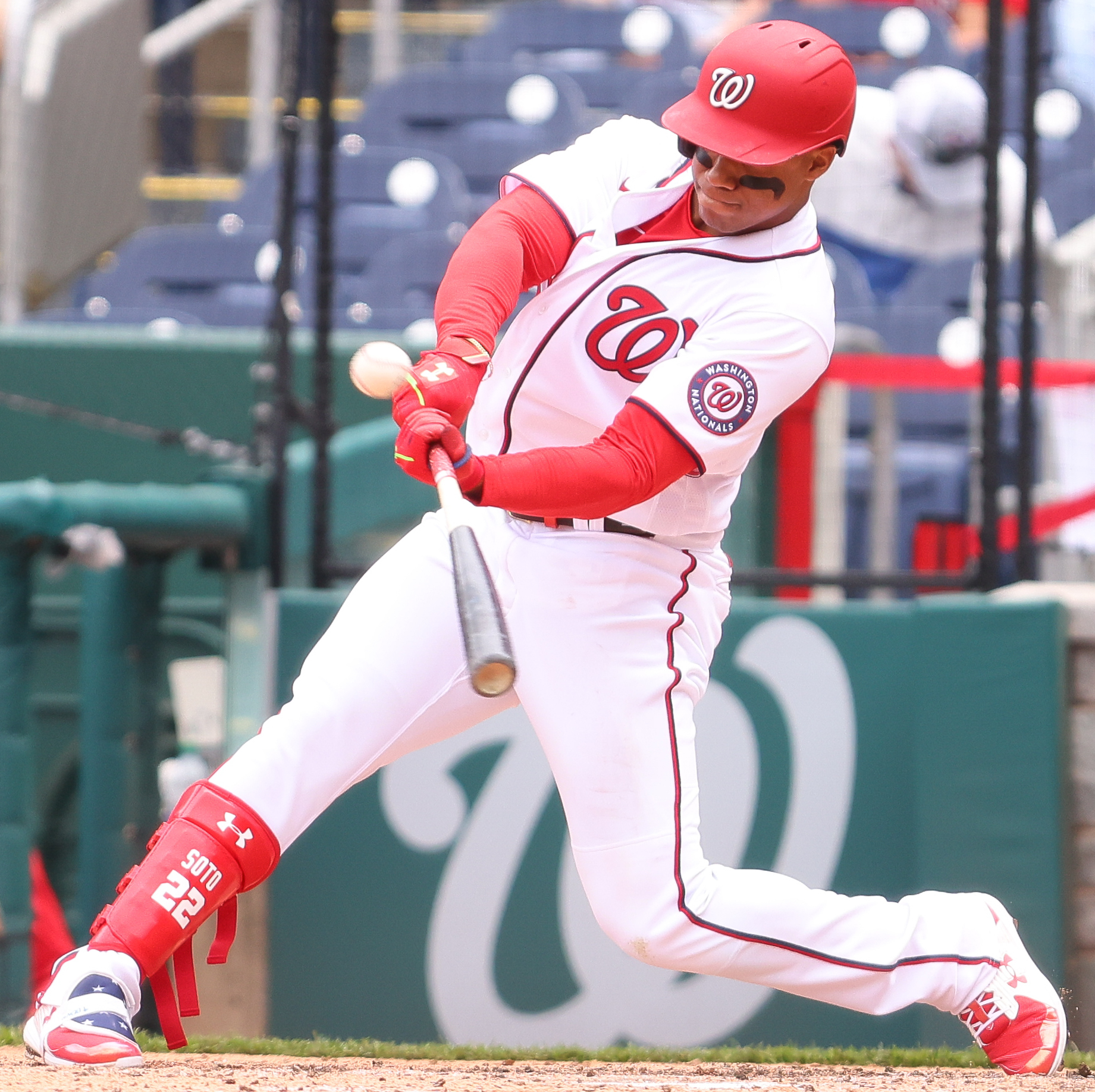
Soto with the Nationals in 2021

The Juan Soto trade was a blockbuster sports trade between the Washington Nationals and San Diego Padres of Major League Baseball (MLB), made on August 2, 2022. The centerpiece was Nationals outfielder Juan Soto, regarded as one of the best hitters of this generation. The magnitude of this transaction drew comparisons to the Herschel Walker trade in the NFL for its 8-player trade. Following the conclusion of the 2022 season, in which the Padres lost the National League Championship Series, and 2023 season where they missed the playoffs, the Padres traded Soto to the New York Yankees during the 2023-24 offseason.

== Background ==
=== Washington Nationals ===
The Washington Nationals were in a period of rebuilding after several years of sustained success, which peaked with their 2019 World Series championship. By 2022, the team had undergone significant roster turnover, losing key players such as Max Scherzer, Anthony Rendon, and Trea Turner, which, along with injuries and underperformance, contributed to one of the worst records in Major League Baseball that season. Despite the team’s struggles, Juan Soto remained the centerpiece of the franchise, emerging as one of the best young players in baseball due to his elite plate discipline, power, and overall hitting ability. Alongside Soto, the Nationals’ roster included notable veterans such as Nelson Cruz, a designated hitter brought in to provide leadership and power, and Josh Bell, a first baseman who had shown flashes of offensive dominance and was a potential trade asset. On the pitching side, the team had a struggling former ace in Stephen Strasburg, who was limited by injuries, later retiring due to this, while younger players like Keibert Ruiz and Cade Cavalli were viewed as key pieces for the team’s future.

As the trade deadline approached, speculation grew around Soto’s future after he rejected a 15-year, $440 million contract extension from the Nationals, signaling uncertainty about his long-term commitment to the team.

=== San Diego Padres ===
The Padres entered the season with high expectations as a team looking to compete for a World Series championship, following a disappointing 2021 campaign in which they collapsed late in the season and missed the playoffs. Led by general manager A.J. Preller, the Padres made aggressive moves to bolster their roster, aiming to challenge the Los Angeles Dodgers in the National League West and establish themselves as serious World Series contenders. At the start of the season, the Padres' core featured stars such as Manny Machado, who was in the midst of an MVP-caliber season, and Fernando Tatís Jr., the electrifying young shortstop who was expected to be one of the faces of the franchise. However, Tatís suffered a wrist injury in the offseason and missed the first half of the season, significantly impacting the team’s offensive production. To compensate, the Padres relied on Machado and a strong starting rotation that included Yu Darvish, Joe Musgrove, Blake Snell, and newly acquired Sean Manaea to keep them in contention. Despite a solid first half, the Padres' offense struggled with inconsistency, prompting Preller to make a blockbuster move at the trade deadline.

=== Juan Soto ===
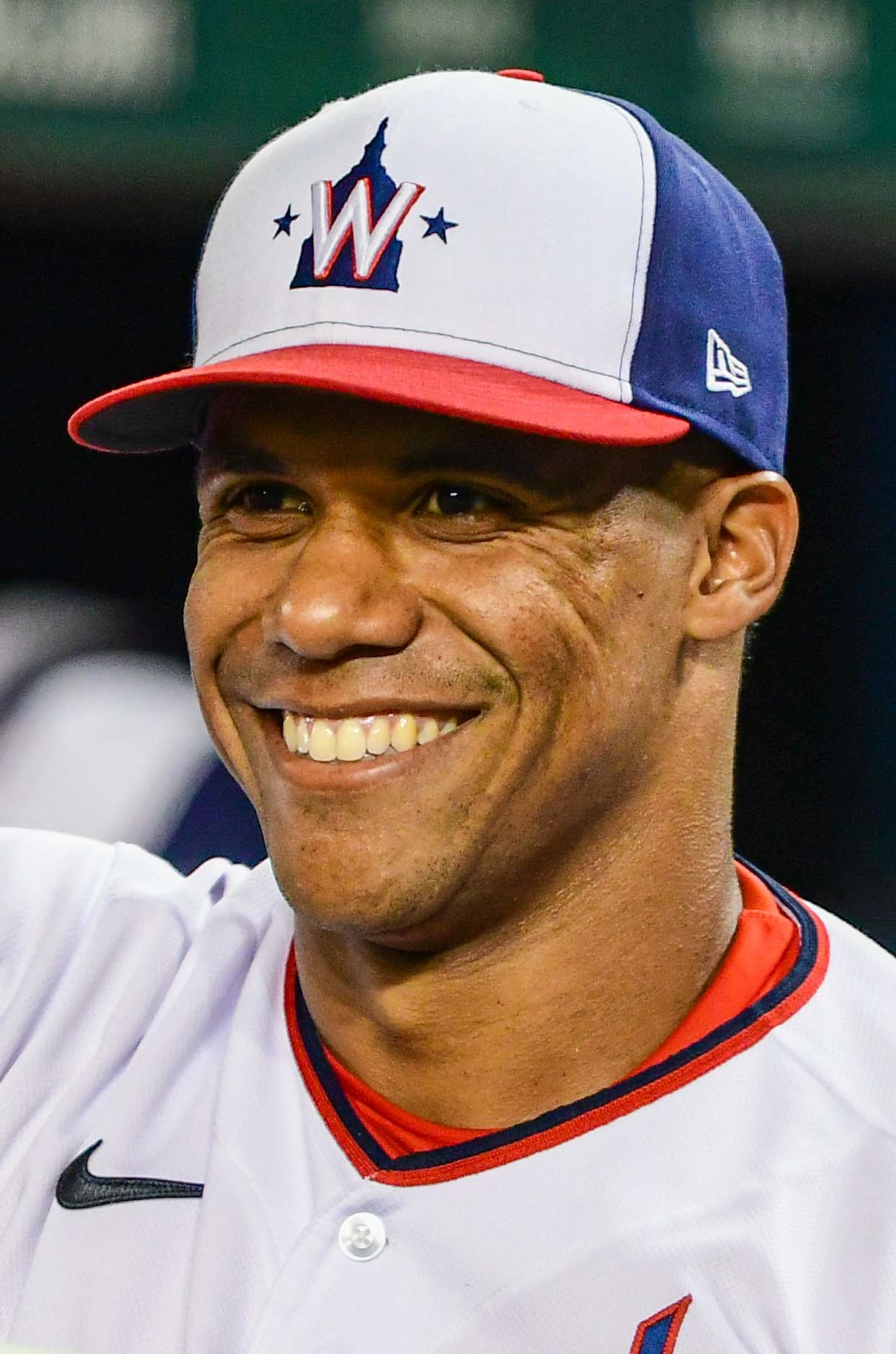
Soto with the Nationals in 2022

Juan Soto signed with the Washington Nationals as an international free agent in July 2015, receiving a $1.5 million signing bonus. He made his professional debut in 2016 with the Gulf Coast League Nationals, where he was named the league's most valuable player after hitting .368 with five home runs and 32 runs batted in (RBIs). He was promoted to the Auburn Doubledays later that season, finishing the year with a .368 batting average. In 2017, Soto played for the Hagerstown Suns in the Class A South Atlantic League, but an ankle injury limited his season. Despite this, he was ranked the Nationals' second-best prospect and the 42nd-best among all prospects. Soto had two rehabilitation stints in the Gulf Coast League but was ultimately shut down for the season due to a hamstring injury. Soto entered 2018 as one of the minor leagues' top prospects. He started the season with the Hagerstown Suns, hitting .373 in 16 games with five home runs and 24 RBIs, before earning promotions to the Potomac Nationals in Class A-Advanced and later the Harrisburg Senators in Class AA. On May 20, 2018, the Nationals called him up to the major leagues after an injury to Howie Kendrick.

Soto debuted with the Washington Nationals on May 20, 2018, and quickly established himself as one of MLB's brightest stars, batting .292/.406/.517 with 22 home runs and 70 RBIs as a rookie. He earned an All-Star selection and finished second in NL Rookie of the Year voting. In 2019, Soto improved further, posting a .282/.401/.548 line with 34 home runs, 110 RBIs, and 108 runs scored. He earned a Silver Slugger award, finished 11th in MVP voting, and played a crucial role in the Nationals’ World Series victory, where he hit .333/.438/.741 in the postseason. His postseason performance included 5 home runs in the World Series. In 2020, Soto had a standout season, winning his first Silver Slugger with a .351/.495/.695 line, 13 home runs, and 37 RBIs in a shortened season. His 1.190 OPS was the highest in MLB, and he finished second in NL MVP voting. His walk percentage led the league, reinforcing his status as one of the most disciplined hitters in the game.

In 2021, Soto continued his excellence with a .313/.465/.534 batting line, 29 home runs, and 95 RBIs. He led the league in walks (145) and was named to the All-Star Team. Soto participated in the Home Run Derby, where he upset Shohei Ohtani in the first round but lost in the semifinals. He was the runner-up in NL MVP voting, finished second in Silver Slugger voting, and declined a 13-year, $350 million contract extension offer from the Nationals. In 2022, Soto avoided arbitration with a $17.1 million contract. He hit his 100th career home run in April, becoming the youngest player to do so in Nationals history. He reportedly rejected a 15-year, $440 million contract extension from the Nationals. Soto was named to the 2022 All-Star Game and won the Home Run Derby, becoming the second-youngest winner ever. On July 16, Soto was offered, and rejected, a 15-year, $440 million maximum contract extension with the Nationals, which would have been the largest contract in baseball history at the time.

During Soto's six-and-a-half seasons with the Nationals, he made the All-MLB Team First Team two times and was named an All-Star four times. Along with Ted Williams, he is one of only two players to lead the major leagues in on-base percentage multiple times by age 22. He is the Nationals' franchise leader in career on-base percentage and holds the record for most walks in a season for the team. As of May 2026, Soto is the active MLB leader for on-base percentage (.4160), 25th all-time.

== Analysis ==
=== Trade impact ===
On August 2, 2022, Washington and San Diego initiated the blockbuster trade. For Washington, the trade signaled a shift toward rebuilding, as the team prioritized acquiring young talent after a period of roster turnover and inconsistent performance. Injuries and underperformance from veterans had contributed to one of the worst records in baseball, deciding to trade Soto and Bell as part of a broader effort to reset the franchise for future contention. The acquisition of multiple high-profile prospects provided the Nationals with a foundation for long-term development.

For San Diego, the trade was part of an aggressive push to strengthen their roster for a postseason run. Soto’s addition bolstered an already competitive lineup featuring Manny Machado, while Bell provided additional offensive depth. The Padres also acquired closer Josh Hader from the Milwaukee Brewers to improve their bullpen, further reinforcing their win-now approach. While the team ultimately finished second in the National League West behind the Los Angeles Dodgers, the trade positioned the Padres as a strong contender in the playoffs.

=== Reactions and responses ===
The deal was widely analyzed for its implications on both teams, with the Nationals focusing on long-term rebuilding and the Padres aiming for immediate success. Nationals' General Manager Mike Rizzo expressed mixed emotions about trading Soto, emphasizing the franchise's commitment to future success. He stated, "I wore this ring purposely... It shows what we've done and what we will do in the future." Rizzo highlighted the team's 2019 slogan, "bumpy roads lead to beautiful places," to convey optimism about the Nationals' rebuilding process. Analysts praised the Padres for acquiring a generational talent in Soto without depleting their farm system entirely. The addition of Bell was seen as a significant boost to their lineup, enhancing their postseason prospects.

However, some experts cautioned that the Padres' aggressive strategy could lead to a top-heavy roster with limited depth, drawing parallels to the Los Angeles Angels' challenges in building a balanced team around star players. In the immediate aftermath, the Padres experienced a surge in fan enthusiasm and ticket sales, reflecting heightened expectations for the team's performance in the upcoming postseason. Conversely, Nationals fans expressed disappointment over losing a homegrown superstar but acknowledged the potential of the prospects acquired, hoping for a swift return to competitiveness.

== Timeline ==
Full trade detail reported

To Washington Nationals	To San Diego Padres
1B Luke Voit; SS CJ Abrams; LHP MacKenzie Gore; OF Robert Hassell III; OF James Wood; RHP Jarlin Susana	OF Juan Soto; 1B Josh Bell

== Aftermath and legacy ==
While the Padres were expected to compete for the division, they ultimately finished second in the NL West behind the dominant Dodgers, who won 111 games. However, with Soto in the lineup and Tatís expected to return, the Padres were poised to make a deep postseason run. Later in the season, their championship hopes took a hit when Tatís was suspended for 80 games due to a PED violation, keeping him out for the remainder of the year.

Despite the loss of Tatís, the Padres reached the playoffs as a Wild Card team and went on a surprising postseason run, defeating the New York Mets in the Wild Card Series and upsetting the Dodgers in the NLDS. However, their momentum would fall as they would lose to the Philadelphia Phillies in the National League Championship Series. The additions of Soto, Bell, and Hader helped fuel their playoff push, marking 2022 as a turning point that many people believed would occur for the franchise.

=== The second trade ===
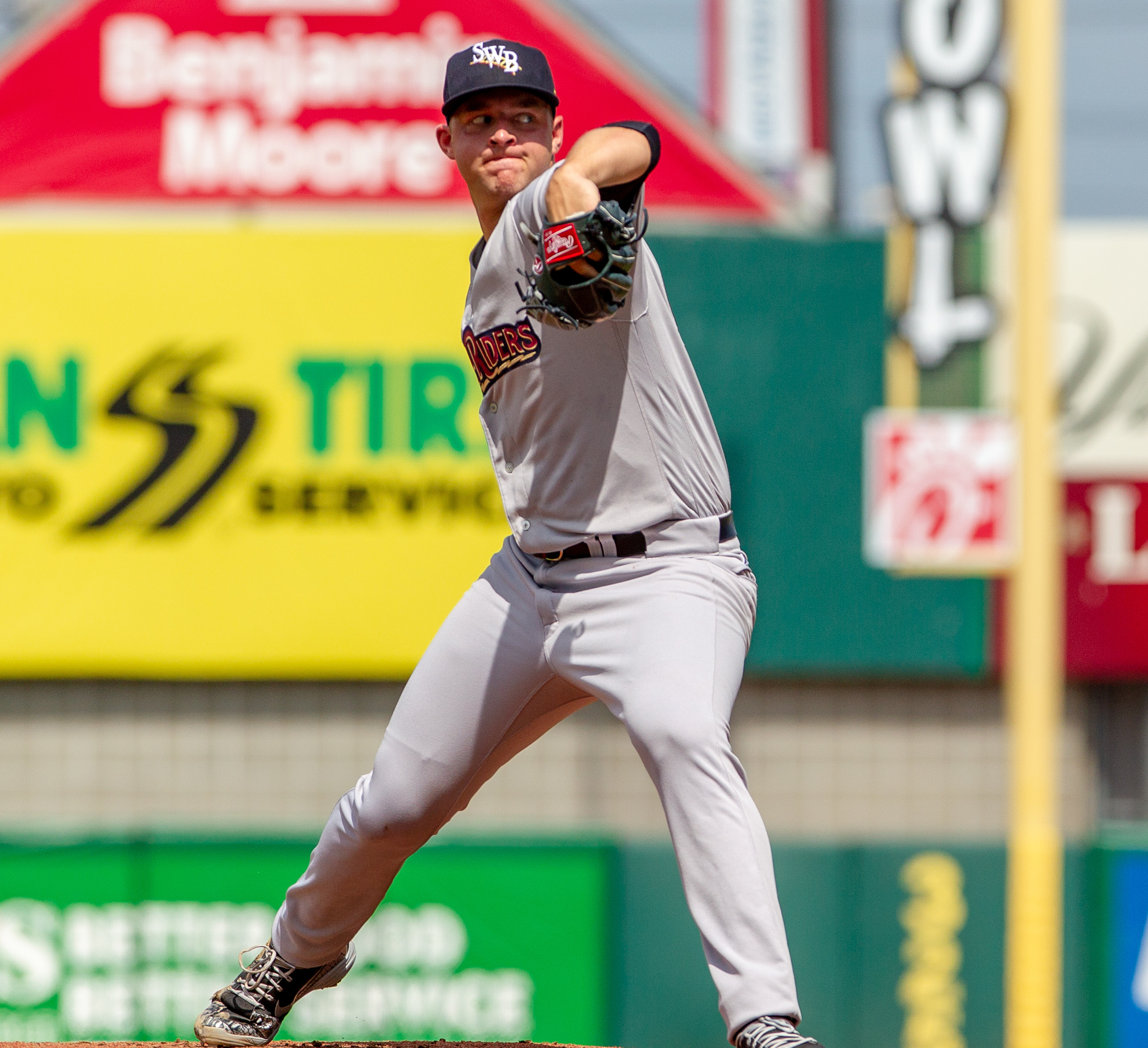
Michael King with the RailRiders in 2018

Full trade detail reported

To San Diego Padres	To New York Yankees
RHP Michael King; RHP Drew Thorpe; RHP Jhony Brito; RHP Randy Vásquez; C Kyle Higashioka	OF Juan Soto; OF Trent Grisham

On December 6, 2023, the San Diego Padres traded outfielder Juan Soto and outfielder Trent Grisham to the New York Yankees. In return, the Padres received right-handed pitchers Michael King, Jhony Brito, Randy Vásquez, and Drew Thorpe, along with catcher Kyle Higashioka. For the Yankees, acquiring Soto added a potent bat to their lineup. Soto's 2024 season was exceptional; he played in 157 games, achieving a .288 batting average, 41 home runs, and 109 RBIs. His performance was instrumental in leading the Yankees to their first World Series appearance since 2009, although they fell to the Los Angeles Dodgers in five games. On the Padres' side, the trade provided significant pitching depth. Michael King transitioned into a starting role, delivering a 2.95 ERA over 173 2/3 innings in 2024. His performance, alongside the acquisition of Dylan Cease—obtained by trading prospect Drew Thorpe—fortified the Padres' rotation and contributed to their competitive season.

Despite Soto's outstanding individual performance, some analysts criticized the Yankees' decision to trade multiple controllable players for what ultimately became a one-year rental. The Padres, in contrast, were praised for acquiring long-term assets, leading some to view the trade as lopsided in favour of San Diego. At the conclusion of the 2024 MLB Season, Soto became a free agent, signing a 15 years, record-breaking, $765,000,000 deal to join the New York Mets, officially making the Yankees the "losers" of the Soto trade. The Yankees lost Juan Soto by a difference of 5 million dollars, causing outrage by the Yankees fanbase over Soto's "sworn" loyalty with the team. Josh Bell, who of which was involved in the original trade, returned to Washington on a one-year, $6 million contract on January 5, 2025.

== See also ==
- Brock for Broglio
- Curse of the Bambino
- White Flag Trade
- Herschel Walker trade
