= James Wood (baseball) =

American baseball player (born 2002)

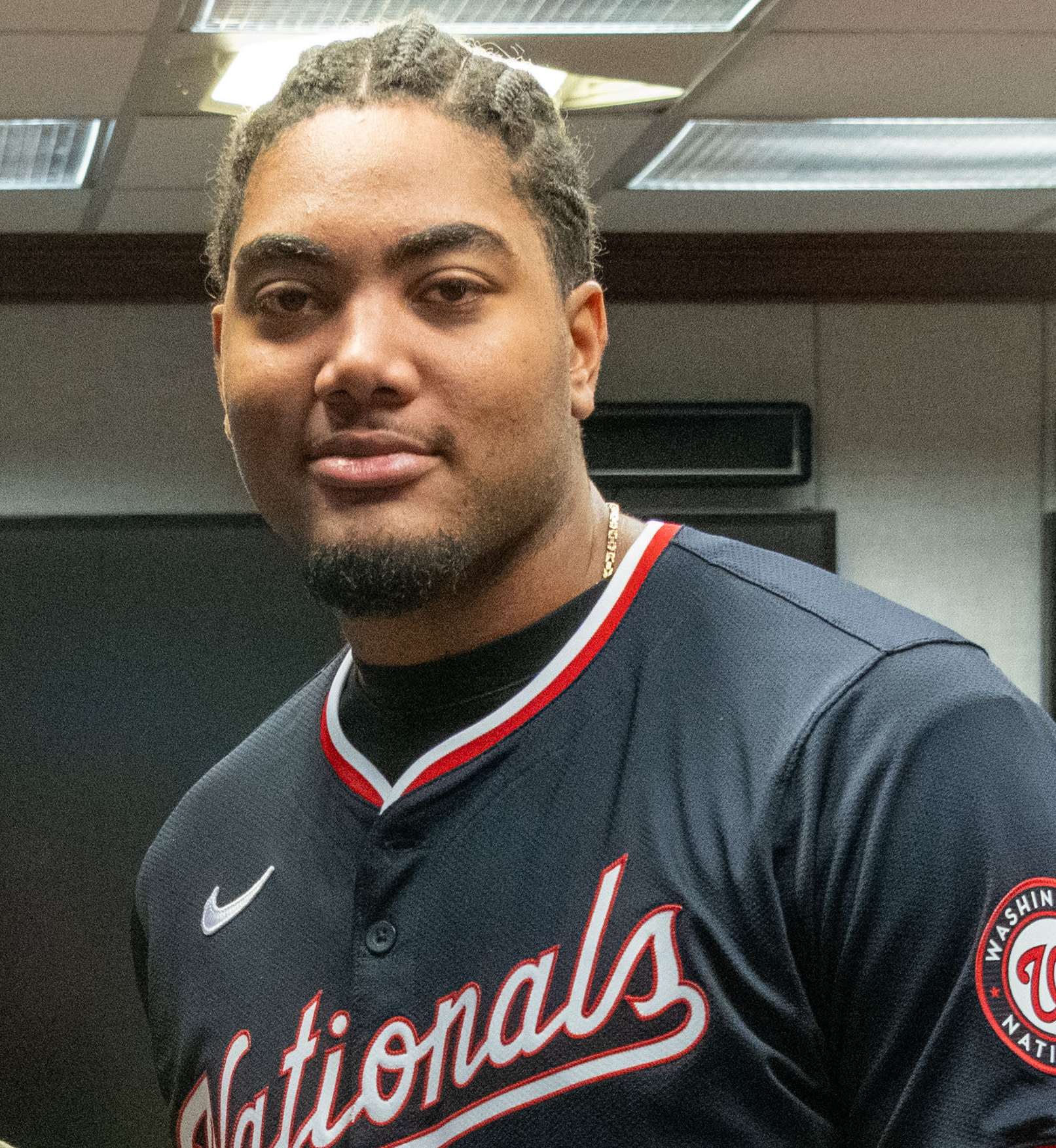
- Wood with the Washington Nationals in 2025

Washington Nationals – No. 29
- Outfielder
- Born: September 17, 2002 (age 24); Rockville, Maryland, U.S.
- Bats: Left Throws: Right

MLB debut
- July 1, 2024, for the Washington Nationals

MLB statistics (through 2026 season)
- Batting average: .261
- Home runs: 70
- Runs batted in: 212
- Stats at Baseball Reference

Teams
- Washington Nationals (2024–present)

Career highlights and awards
- 2× All-Star (2025, 2026); Silver Slugger Award (2026)

James Irvin Wood (born September 17, 2002) is an American professional baseball outfielder for the Washington Nationals of Major League Baseball (MLB). Wood made his MLB debut in 2024 and was named an All-Star in 2025 and 2026.

== Early life ==
Wood grew up in Olney, Maryland, and played his foundational baseball years with the Olney Pirates under the Olney Boy's and Girl's Club's. He initially attended St. John’s College High School in Washington, D.C., where he played varsity baseball and basketball. He transferred to IMG Academy in Bradenton, Florida in his junior year because of the St. John’s College High School baseball program's requirement to play exclusively with their coach's travel team in the summer. Wood gave up basketball in order to focus solely on baseball at IMG. He committed to play college baseball at Mississippi State University in Starkville shortly before transferring to IMG. After a strong performance while playing in the 2020 East Coast Pro Showcase, Wood entered his senior year as a top prospect in the 2021 MLB Draft. Wood batted .258 as a senior, causing him to fall slightly in most draft prospect rankings.

== Professional career ==
=== San Diego Padres ===
The San Diego Padres selected Wood in the second round, with the 62nd overall pick, in the 2021 Major League Baseball draft. He signed with the team on July 20, 2021, and received a $2.6 million signing bonus, compared with the draft slot's recommended bonus of $1.1 million. Wood was assigned to the Rookie-level Arizona Complex League Padres to start his professional career, batting .372 with three home runs, 22 RBI, and ten stolen bases over 26 games. He opened the 2022 season with the Lake Elsinore Storm of the Single-A California League.

=== Washington Nationals ===
On August 2, 2022, the Padres traded Wood, CJ Abrams, Luke Voit, MacKenzie Gore, Robert Hassell III, and Jarlín Susana to the Washington Nationals in exchange for Juan Soto and Josh Bell. The Nationals assigned him to the Fredericksburg Nationals of the Single-A Carolina League. Wood batted .293 with eight doubles, two home runs, and 17 RBI in 21 games with Fredericksburg. He was assigned to the High-A Wilmington Blue Rocks at the beginning of the 2023 season. Wood was promoted to the Double-A Harrisburg Senators after batting .293 with eight home runs and 36 RBI in 42 games with Wilmington. He then hit .248 with 18 homers and 10 steals in 87 games for Harrisburg. He was selected to play in the 2023 All-Star Futures Game.

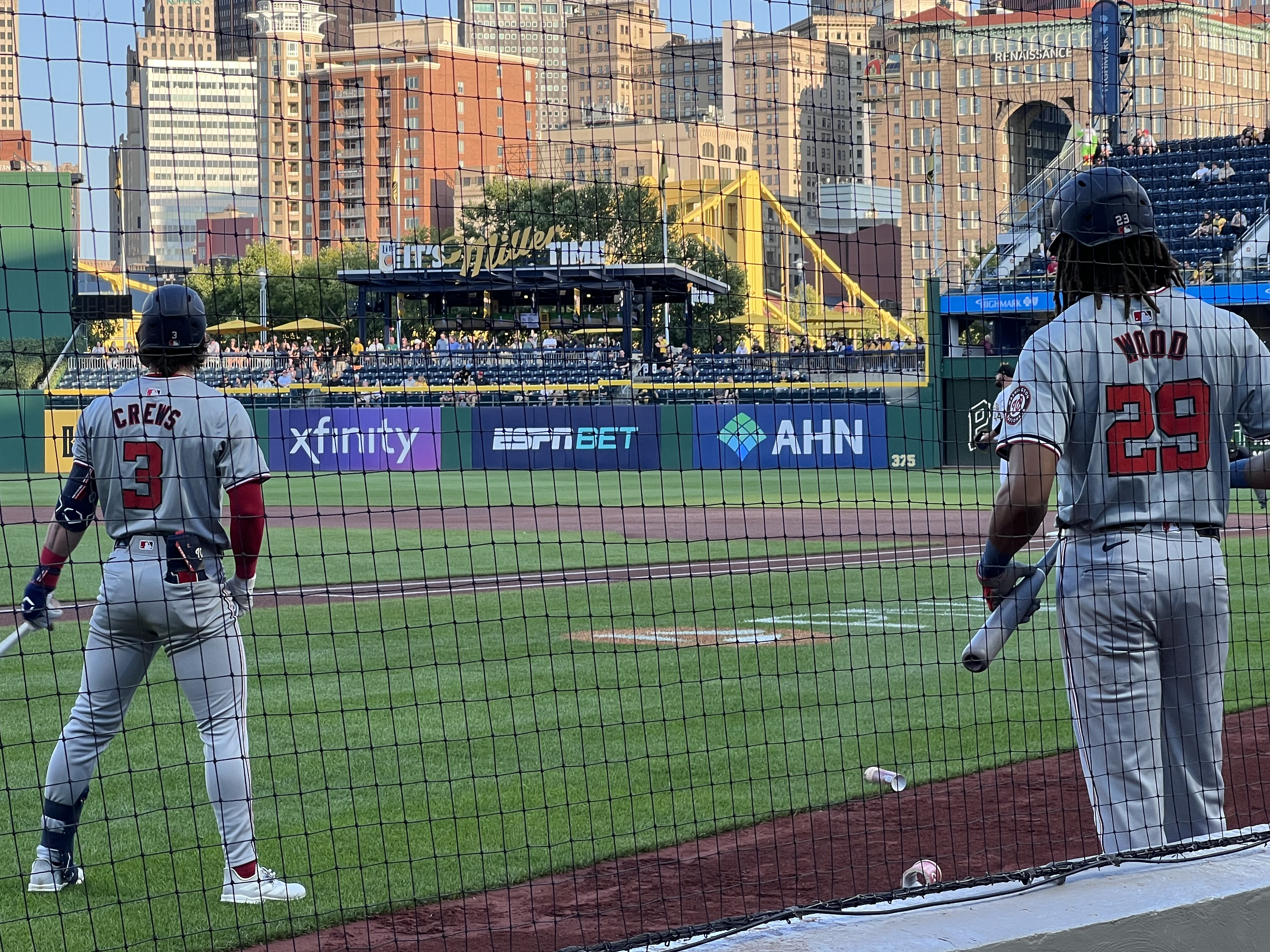
James Wood and Dylan Crews on deck in 2024

Wood was promoted to the Triple-A Rochester Red Wings to begin the 2024 season. After hitting .353 with 10 home runs and 10 stolen bases in 52 games at Triple-A, Wood was ranked as the #1 prospect in baseball according to Baseball America's 2024 midseason update.

Wood was promoted to the major leagues for the first time on July 1, 2024. On July 1, he recorded his first hit, a single, in the second inning against New York Mets' pitcher David Peterson. He hit his first MLB home run, a three-run home run off St. Louis Cardinals starter Lance Lynn, on July 6. Wood finished the 2024 season playing in 79 games with the Nationals, hitting .264 with nine home runs, 41 RBIs, and 14 stolen bases.

Wood was named to his first Opening Day roster to begin the 2025 season. On April 25, 2025 against the New York Mets, Wood hit his first career walk-off hit via a RBI single to give the Nationals a 5-4 victory over the Mets. On June 19 against the Colorado Rockies, Wood hit his first career walk-off home run to give the Nationals a 4-3 victory over the Colorado Rockies in extra innings. Wood became the first player to be intentionally walked four times since Barry Bonds in 2004 in a game against the Los Angeles Angels on June 29, 2025. On July 3, 2025, he was named as a participant in the 2025 MLB Home Run Derby. On the same day, Wood went a career-high 5-for-5 with a home run and two RBIs in a 11-7 win over the Detroit Tigers as he recorded his first career five-hit game. On July 6, Wood was selected to the 2025 Major League Baseball All-Star Game, his first all-star appearance in MLB. Wood finished the 2025 season having appeared in 157 games with a .256 batting average, 31 home runs, 94 RBIs, 38 doubles, and 15 stolen bases.

Wood hit his first career grand slam, an inside-the-park grand slam, on May 19, 2026 off Mets starter Nolan McLean. It was the first inside-the-park grand slam in MLB since 2022. On July 4th, he was selected to the 2026 Major League Baseball All-Star Game, his second consecutive selection. Playing in 135 games due to an oblique injury, he "slashed .265/.388/.503 with a .891 OPS [5th in the MLB] and 102 walks [5th in the MLB] in his age-23 season. He led all players in average exit velocity (95.4 mph) and hard-hit percentage. Among the entire National League, he ranked second in runs, OPS and wOBA; third in walks, on-base percentage and wRC+; sixth in slugging percentage; and tied for ninth in homers."

== Player profile ==
Wood is listed at 6 feet 6 inches (1.98 m) and 234 pounds (106 kg), making him one of the tallest current players in MLB. He is regarded as a player with high potential because of his power, consistent ball contact, and speed. In his rookie season he had an Average Exit Velocity of 92.8 mph (95th percentile among MLB players) and a Sprint Speed of 28.7 feet per second (85th percentile).

== Personal life ==
Wood's father, Kenny Wood, played college basketball for the Richmond Spiders and is a member of the school's athletic Hall of Fame. He also played professionally in Europe. His sister, Sydney Wood, played college basketball for the Northwestern Wildcats and was a team captain. James Wood is the nephew of former NBA player Howard Wood, who played for the Utah Jazz.
