= Juan Soto =

Dominican baseball player (born 1998)

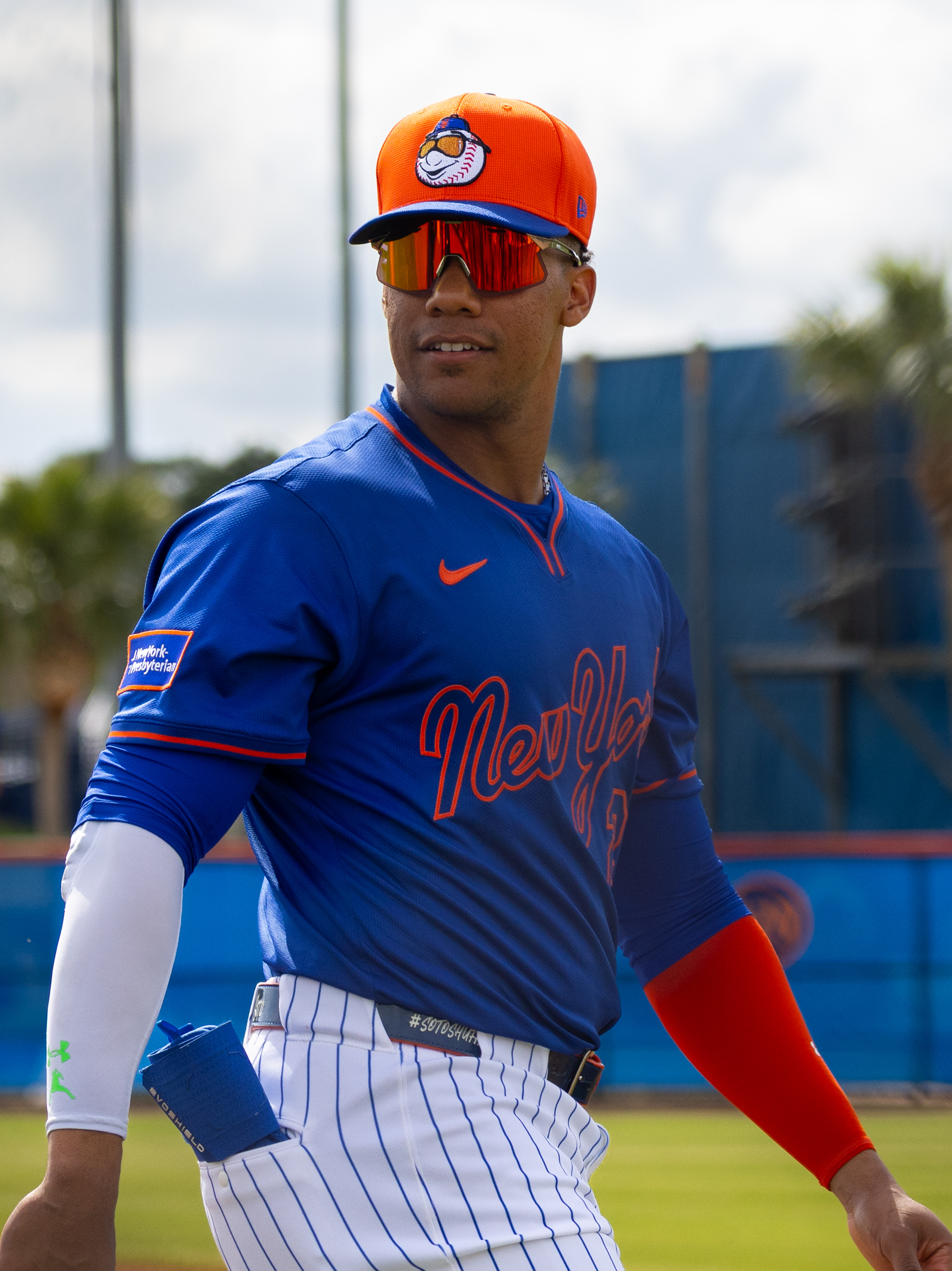
- Soto with the New York Mets in 2025

New York Mets – No. 22
- Outfielder
- Born: October 25, 1998 (age 28); Santo Domingo, Dominican Republic
- Bats: Left Throws: Left

MLB debut
- May 20, 2018, for the Washington Nationals

MLB statistics (through 2026 season)
- Batting average: .281
- Hits: 1,196
- Home runs: 271
- Runs batted in: 765
- Stats at Baseball Reference

Teams
- Washington Nationals (2018–2022); San Diego Padres (2022–2023); New York Yankees (2024); New York Mets (2025–present)

Career highlights and awards
- 5× All-Star (2021–2024, 2026); World Series champion (2019); 4× All-MLB First Team (2020, 2021, 2024, 2025); 6× Silver Slugger Award (2020–2025); NL batting champion (2020); NL stolen base leader (2025) (Note: Tied with Oneil Cruz)
Medals
Men's baseball
Representing Dominican Republic
World Baseball Classic
Bronze medal – third place	2026 Miami	Team

Juan José Soto Pacheco (born October 25, 1998) is a Dominican professional baseball outfielder for the New York Mets of Major League Baseball (MLB). He has previously played in MLB for the Washington Nationals, San Diego Padres, and New York Yankees. Soto is a six-time Silver Slugger Award winner and five-time All-Star.

Soto signed with the Nationals as an international free agent in 2015. He made his MLB debut in 2018 and was the runner-up for the National League (NL) Rookie of the Year Award. In 2019, he played a key part in the Nationals' first World Series championship, earning him the Babe Ruth Award. In 2020, he won the National League batting title with a .351 average. After being traded to the Padres at the 2022 trade deadline, Soto was dealt to the Yankees following the 2023 season. In his lone season with the team, he reached the 2024 World Series and finished third in American League (AL) Most Valuable Player (MVP) voting. After becoming a free agent for the first time in his career, Soto signed a 15-year, $765 million contract with the Mets in the offseason, the largest contract in professional sports history.

Soto is renowned for his exceptional plate discipline and known for his unique batter's box movements, dubbed the "Soto Shuffle."

== Early life ==
Soto was born on October 25, 1998, to Juan Soto Sr. and Belkis Pacheco in Santo Domingo. He has an older sister and a younger brother, Elian, who signed with the Nationals as an international free agent once he became eligible in January 2023. His father was a salesman and a catcher in a local men's league and encouraged his sons to make baseball their passion. Soto is naturally right-handed and was encouraged by his father to throw left-handed for an athletic advantage.

== Professional career ==
=== Minor leagues ===
Soto signed with the Washington Nationals as an international free agent for a $1.5 million signing bonus in July 2015. He made his professional debut in 2016 with the Gulf Coast League Nationals in the rookie-level Gulf Coast League (GCL) and was named the GCL's most valuable player after hitting .368 with five home runs and 32 runs batted in (RBIs). In September 2016 he was promoted to the Auburn Doubledays of the Class A-Short Season New York-Penn League near the end of the 2016 season. Appearing in six games for the Doubledays, he went 9-for-21 (.429) with three doubles and an RBI. He finished the 2016 season with an overall batting average of .368, five home runs, and 32 RBIs.

Promoted to play with the Hagerstown Suns of the Class A South Atlantic League in 2017, Soto got off to a hot start before injuring his ankle while sliding into home in a game on May 2 and landing on the disabled list. At the time of his injury, he was batting .360 with three home runs in 23 games with the Suns. In July 2017, MLB Pipeline ranked Soto the Nationals' second-best prospect and the 42nd-best among all prospects. Soto did not return to the Suns in 2017, but he had two rehabilitation stints with the GCL Nationals, one of five games in July 2017 and a second one of four games in September 2017 before injuring his hamstring and finally being shut down for the season. In those nine games in the GCL, he went 8-for-25 (.320) with a double, a triple, and four RBIs. He finished the 2017 season with a batting average of .351, three home runs, and 18 RBIs.

Soto entered 2018 as one of the minor leagues' top prospects. He started the season with Hagerstown, hitting .373 in 16 games with five home runs and 24 RBIs, before being promoted in late April to the Potomac Nationals in the Class A-Advanced Carolina League. After 15 games with Potomac, in which he hit .371 with seven home runs and 18 RBIs, he was promoted in mid-May to the Harrisburg Senators in the Double-A Eastern League. He had appeared in eight games for the Senators, going 10-for-31 (.323) with two doubles, two home runs, and 10 RBIs. On May 20, the Nationals called him up to the major leagues for the first time to reinforce their outfield after an injury to second baseman and outfielder Howie Kendrick.

=== Washington Nationals (2018–2022) ===
==== 2018 season: Rookie season ====
Soto made his major-league debut on May 20, 2018, becoming the youngest player in the major leagues at 19 years, 207 days and the first player born in 1998 to appear in a major-league game. He came on as a pinch-hitter in the 8th inning of a game against the Los Angeles Dodgers at Nationals Park and struck out swinging against right-handed reliever Erik Goeddel.

Soto made his first major-league start the next day, playing left field in a game against the San Diego Padres at Nationals Park, and on the first pitch of his first plate appearance of the game, got his first major-league hit, a 422 ft (129 m) opposite-field three-run homer off Robbie Erlin. After rounding the bases and returning to the dugout, Soto stepped back out for a curtain call from the crowd. He became the youngest player in franchise history to hit a home run and the first teenager to homer in a major-league game since teammate Bryce Harper did it at age 19 in 2012. "He's a special player," Harper said of Soto after the game. Soto became the youngest major league player since Ken Griffey Jr. in 1989 to be intentionally walked in a game when Baltimore Orioles manager Buck Showalter elected to do so rather than give him an opportunity to drive in a run on May 29.

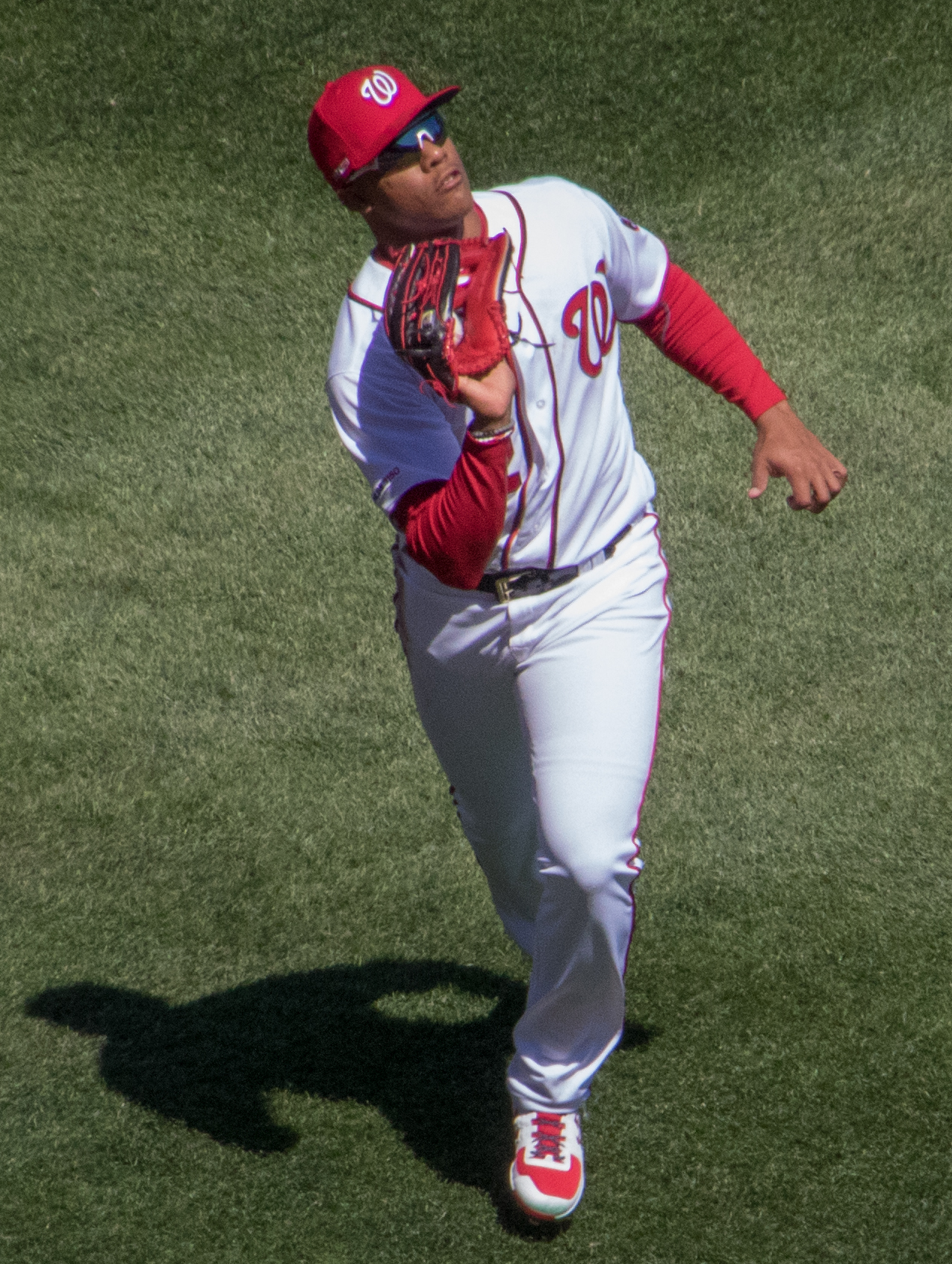
Soto with the Nationals in 2019

In June, shortly after Soto was called up to the major leagues, Baseball America listed him as the Nationals' top prospect, overtaking fellow outfielder Víctor Robles, and the fourth-best overall prospect in baseball. Soto contributed to a notable oddity when he hit a home run against the New York Yankees on June 18. The contest began on May 15, five days before Soto made his major league debut, but was suspended until June 18 due to inclement weather with the score at 3–3. Since the stoppage occurred at the end of the fifth inning, a team would have been awarded the win if they were ahead, which implied that he had technically hit a home run before his MLB debut. To prevent confusion, it was added in sequence to his already accrued home run total as his sixth home run. It was also one of three home runs Soto hit in his first five plate appearances against the Yankees.

On June 21, he started as the cleanup hitter for the first time in the major leagues, against the Baltimore Orioles. He doubled home the winning run in a 4–2 victory. Soto's first multi-home run game came on June 13 against the Yankees, and he repeated the feat on June 29, at Citizens Bank Park against the Philadelphia Phillies, tallying two home runs, four hits, and five RBIs as the Nationals defeated the Phillies 17–7. Soto had another multi-home run game against the Phillies on September 11, going 3-for-4 with four RBIs in the second game of a doubleheader. On September 16, Soto became the youngest player to steal 3 bases in a game, breaking Rickey Henderson's mark of 20 years, 241 days by accomplishing the feat at 19 years, 326 days.

In 2018, Soto slashed .292/.406/.517 with 79 walks, 22 home runs, and 70 RBIs in 494 plate appearances and was the youngest player in the NL. He was named the NL Rookie of the Month in June, July, and September, becoming the sixth player to win the award 3 or more times. Soto set many MLB teenage records during the season, including the most walks by a teenager (79), most multi-homer games by a teenager (3), highest OBP by a teenager (.406), and highest OPS by a teenager (.923). His 22 homers tied him with then-teammate Bryce Harper for 2nd most home runs by a teenager and he became the only teenager to walk more than 60 times in a season and post an OBP over .400. He finished second in voting for NL Rookie of the Year to Atlanta Braves outfielder Ronald Acuña Jr., becoming the only 3-time Rookie of the Month winner to not win the Rookie of the Year award.

After the season, Soto was selected to the MLB All-Star Team for the 2018 MLB Japan All-Star Series.

==== 2019 season: World Series champion ====
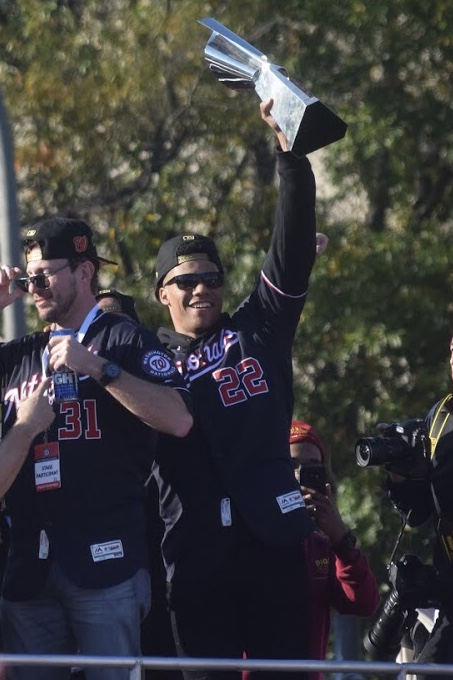
Soto (with teammate Max Scherzer) at the Nationals' victory parade in 2019

On August 19, 2019, Soto became only the fourth player in MLB history to record 100 extra-base hits before his 21st birthday, joining Mel Ott, Tony Conigliaro, and his former teammate, Bryce Harper. He later became the seventh MLB player in history to reach 30 home runs before their 21st birthday. In 2019, he batted .282/.401/.548 with 110 runs (7th), 108 walks (3rd), 34 home runs, and 110 RBIs (9th) and he stole 12 bases in 13 attempts.

With the Nationals trailing the Milwaukee Brewers 3–1 in the bottom of the eighth during the NL Wild Card Game, Soto hit a bases-clearing single off Brewers closer Josh Hader to give the Nationals a 4–3 lead. They would later hang on to the lead and advance to the National League Division Series.

In Game 3 of the NLDS against the Los Angeles Dodgers, Soto hit his first career postseason home run off Hyun-jin Ryu. In the decisive Game 5 of the NLDS, Soto hit an RBI single in the 6th inning off Walker Buehler and later hit a game-tying home run in the top of the 8th off Clayton Kershaw. The Nationals would go on to win in 10 innings and eliminate the Dodgers, advancing to the National League Championship Series for the first time in franchise history. Soto went 3–16 (.188) with a double and an RBI in the NLCS against the St. Louis Cardinals and the Nationals advanced to the World Series after sweeping the best-of-seven series.

In Game 1 of the World Series, Soto hit a home run off Astros' ace Gerrit Cole to start the fourth inning and became the fourth youngest player in MLB history to ever hit a home run in a World Series. Game 3 of the World Series fell on October 25, Soto's 21st birthday, fulfilling an approximately 10-year-old prediction made by his father who had said that Soto would play in the World Series on his birthday. In Game 5 of the series, Soto hit another home run off Cole, providing the lone Nationals' run in a 7–1 loss which put the Nationals down 3 games to 2 in the best-of-seven series. In Game 6, Soto hit his third home run of the series off Justin Verlander, a go-ahead solo run home run, to help force a decisive Game 7.

The Nationals would go on to win the World Series, their first in franchise history. Soto batted .333/.438/.741 with 3 home runs and 7 RBIs in the World Series and led the Nationals in home runs, hits, walks, and runs scored. In the postseason overall, he batted .277/.373/.554 with 5 home runs and 14 RBIs and was named the co-winner (with Stephen Strasburg) of the 2019 Babe Ruth Award. He was also named to the All-MLB Second Team in the first edition of the annual award.

==== 2020 season: Batting champion ====
On July 23, 2020, just before the opening game of a shortened 2020 season, it was announced that Soto had tested positive for COVID-19. Soto returned to action on August 4 after multiple negative tests; he told The Washington Post that he had been following team rules for social distancing before the positive test, never experienced COVID-19 symptoms, received negative results on three rapid-result tests the day he learned of the positive test result through the official MLB testing program, and believed the result that caused him to miss time was a false positive.

In a series at Citi Field against the division-rival New York Mets, Soto first hit a home run 463 feet (141 m) on August 10, the longest of his career, then another home run measured at 466 feet (142 m) on August 12 to set a new personal best. He was named National League Player of the Week on August 17, his first such honor.

Despite losing the first week of play to the positive COVID-19 test and missing some time in September with an elbow injury, Soto qualified for the batting title and became the youngest player in National League history to win, hitting .351 during the regular season. Soto also led all qualified hitters in MLB in on-base percentage (.490), slugging percentage (.695), and on-base plus slugging (1.185), posting the highest marks in those three categories for any major league hitter with at least 195 plate appearances in a season since Barry Bonds in the 2004 season. Soto won his first career Silver Slugger Award and was also named to the All-MLB First Team for the first time in his career. In spite of Soto's exceptional play, the Nationals were unable to capitalize, missing the playoffs even with an expanded format.

==== 2021 season: First All-Star season and NL MVP runner-up ====
In the Nationals' first game of the season on April 6, 2021, Soto hit a walk-off single off Will Smith of the Atlanta Braves for his first career walk-off hit. On April 20, Soto was put on the 10-day injured list for a left shoulder strain and was reinstated to the active roster on May 4. On July 4, Soto was named a reserve to the National League All-Star Team for the 2021 All-Star Game, receiving his first All-Star selection. Soto also participated in the Home Run Derby for the first time, where he upset top-seeded Los Angeles Angels pitcher/designated hitter Shohei Ohtani in double-overtime before losing in the semifinal to eventual repeat winner Pete Alonso of the New York Mets.

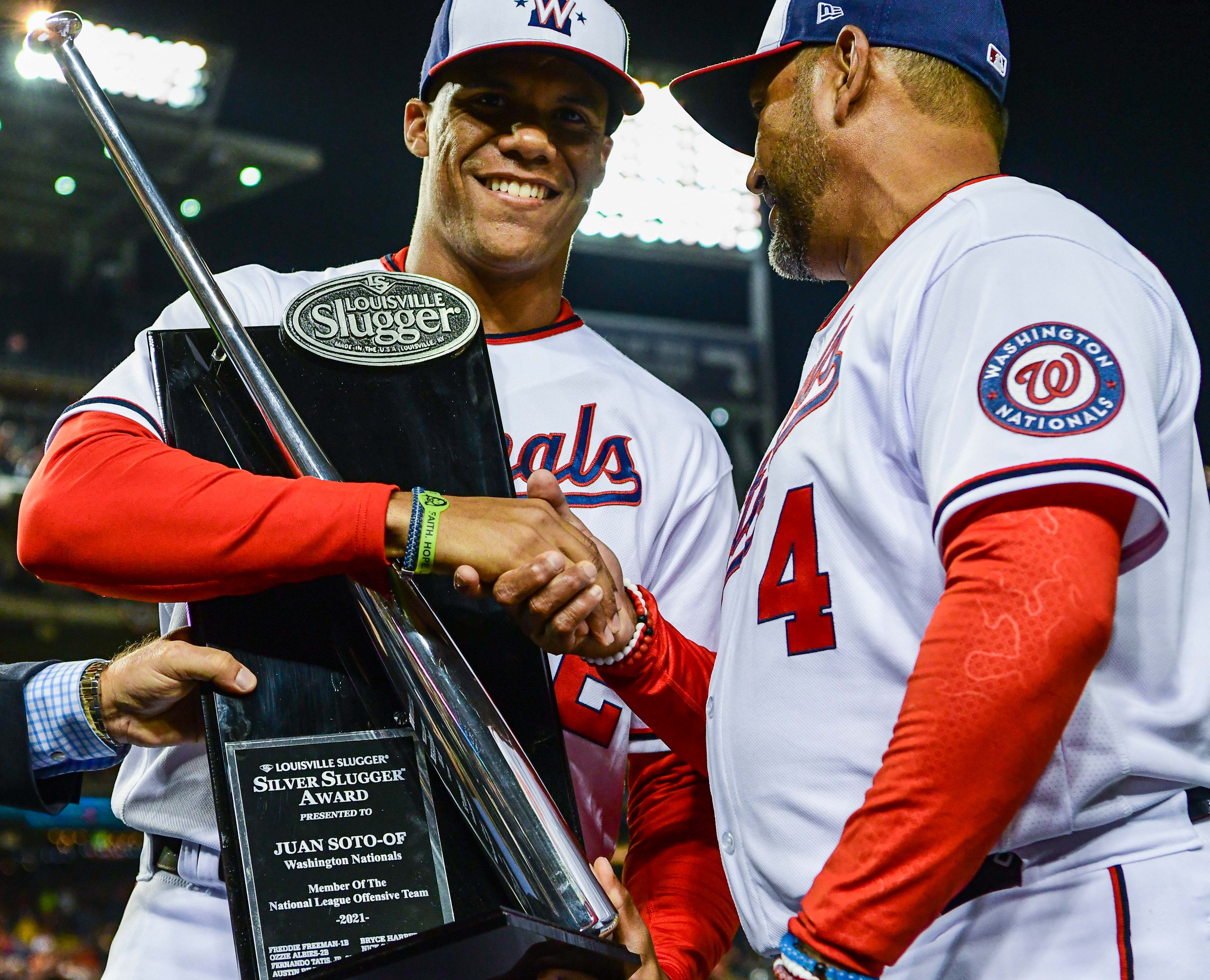
Soto (left) being presented with his 2021 Silver Slugger Award during a pregame ceremony at Nationals Park

In 2021, Soto batted .313/.465/.534 with 29 home runs, 95 RBIs, and 111 runs scored. He reinforced his reputation as the most disciplined hitter in baseball by swinging at an MLB-low 15.1% of pitches outside the strike zone, leading the next closest player, Dodgers infielder Max Muncy, by 4.0 percentage points. Soto joined Ted Williams as the only players in MLB history to have led the major leagues in on-base percentage multiple times by age 22. His total of 145 walks was the highest in a single season since Barry Bonds set the major league record with 232 in 2004. Soto's former teammate Bryce Harper of the Philadelphia Phillies ranked second in the league with 100 walks, making Soto only the 6th player in the live-ball era to have led his league in walks by a margin of 40 or more. He led the major leagues in walk percentage, at 22.2%, and intentional walks, with 23. He had the best walk/strikeout ratio in the majors, at 1.56. He swung at the lowest percentage of pitches of all major leaguers, at 35.0%.

Following the season, Soto was named to the All-MLB First Team and won the National League Silver Slugger Award for the outfield, receiving both honors for the second straight season. Soto was the runner-up in National League Most Valuable Player Award (NL MVP) voting, losing out to Harper. Soto became the sixth player in MLB history to finish as runner-up in both MVP and Rookie of the Year voting.

Prior to the 2021–22 MLB lockout, the Nationals offered Soto a 13-year, $350 million contract extension which would've signed the then 23-year-old Soto through his age 35 season in 2034. However, Soto declined the offer and said that he and his agent, Scott Boras, wanted to wait until he became a free agent after the 2024 season to sign a contract. "I still think of Washington as the place where I would like to spend the rest of my career", said Soto.

==== 2022 season ====
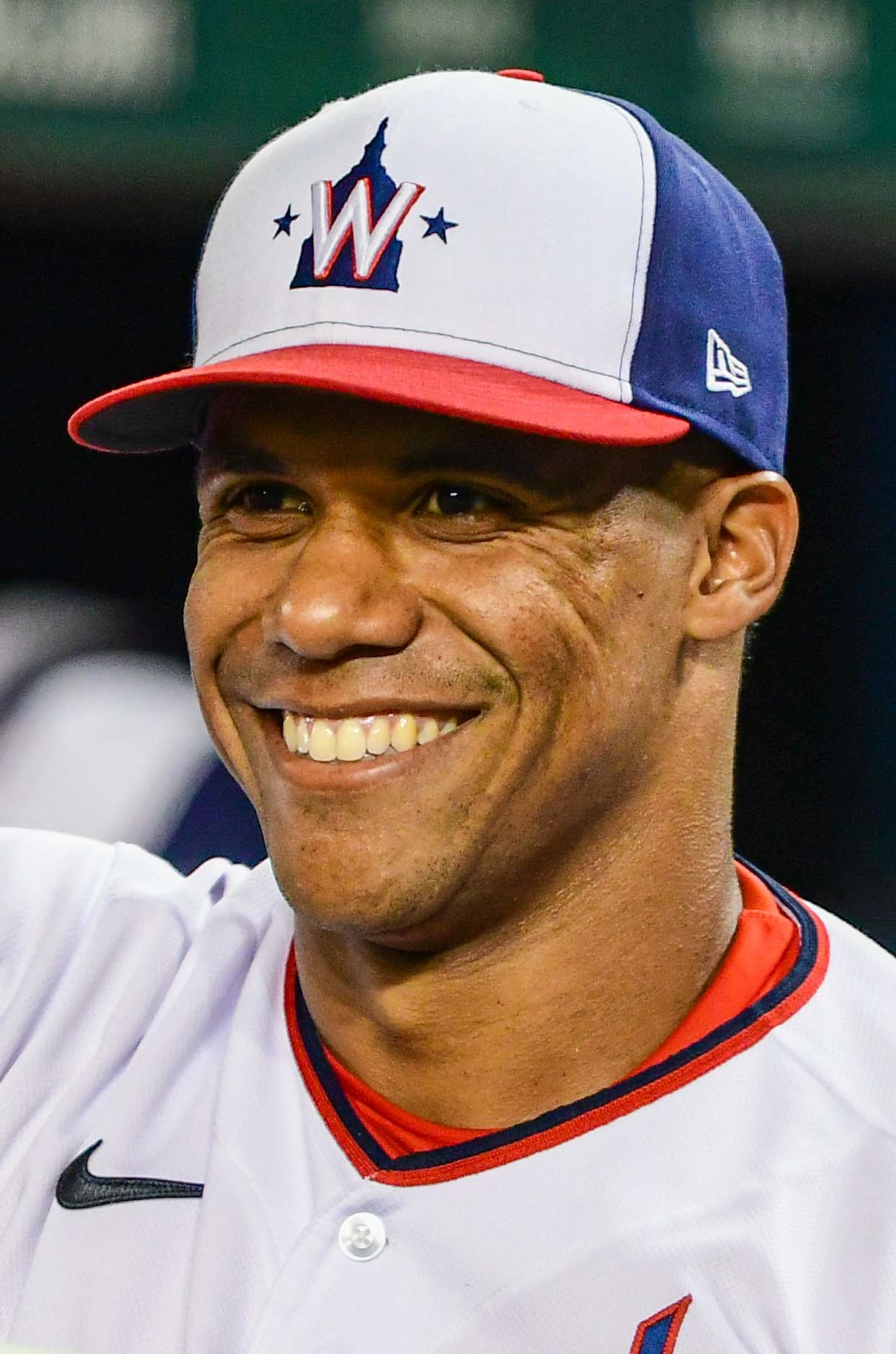
Soto with the Nationals in 2022

On March 22, 2022, Soto agreed to a $17.1 million contract with the Nationals, avoiding arbitration. On April 12, Soto hit his 100th career home run off of Atlanta Braves pitcher Bryce Elder. At the age of 23 years, 169 days, Soto became the youngest player to reach that milestone in Nationals history and the eighth-youngest player to reach the milestone in MLB history.

Soto reportedly rejected a 15-year, $440 million contract extension offer by the Nationals during the 2022 season.

Soto was named to the 2022 MLB All-Star Game and also participated in the 2022 MLB Home Run Derby, which he won. He became the second youngest Home Run Derby winner behind Juan González who won in 1993; Soto was one day older.

=== San Diego Padres (2022–2023) ===
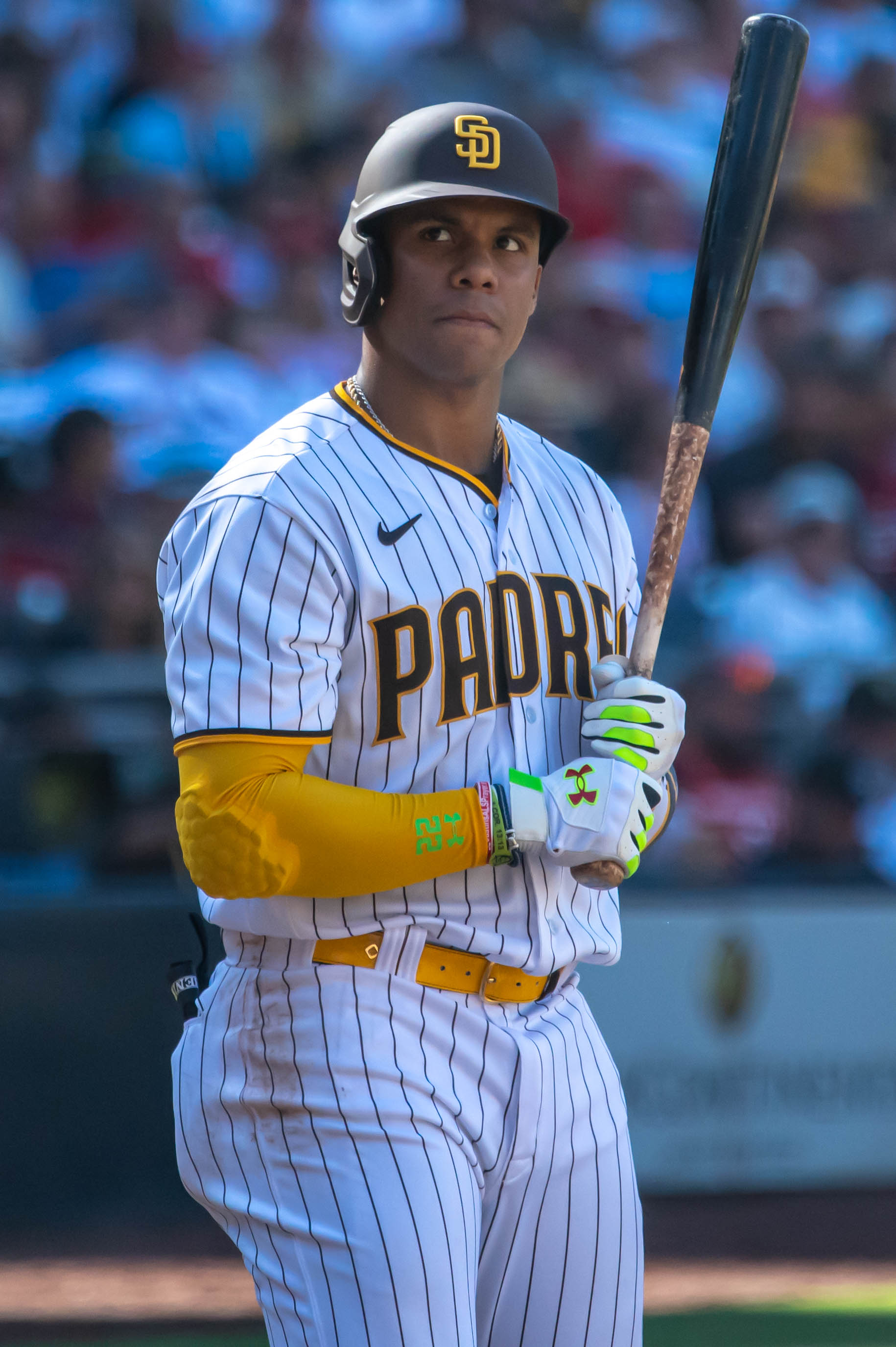
Soto with the Padres in 2022

On August 2, 2022, the Nationals traded Soto and Josh Bell to the San Diego Padres in exchange for CJ Abrams, MacKenzie Gore, Robert Hassell, James Wood, Jarlín Susana, and Luke Voit. The magnitude of the trade drew comparisons to the Herschel Walker trade in the NFL.

On August 12, just ten days after being traded to the Padres, Soto faced the Nationals in Washington, where he received a 45-second-long standing ovation from the crowd. For the remainder of the 2022 season with the Padres, Soto played 51 games with the team, compiling a .236 batting average, 6 home runs, 16 RBIs, and 36 walks. He reached the 2022 NLCS with the Padres, hitting two home runs in the series as they lost in five games to the Philadelphia Phillies.

Overall in 2022, combined with both teams, Soto played 152 total games with a .242 batting average, 27 home runs, 62 RBIs, and an MLB-leading 135 walks. He walked in 20.3% of his plate appearances, tops in the major leagues, and had the highest walk/strikeout rate in the majors, at 1.41. He swung at a lower percentage of pitches outside the strike zone (19.9%) than any other major league batter.

On January 13, 2023, Soto signed a one-year, $23 million contract with the Padres, avoiding salary arbitration. Overall in 2023, Soto played in all 162 games with a .275 batting average, 35 home runs, 109 RBIs and an MLB-leading 132 walks.

=== New York Yankees (2024) ===
On December 6, 2023, the Padres traded Soto and Trent Grisham to the New York Yankees for Michael King, Drew Thorpe, Jhony Brito, Randy Vásquez, and Kyle Higashioka. Soto and the Yankees avoided salary arbitration prior to the start of the 2024 season, agreeing to a one-year contract worth $31 million.

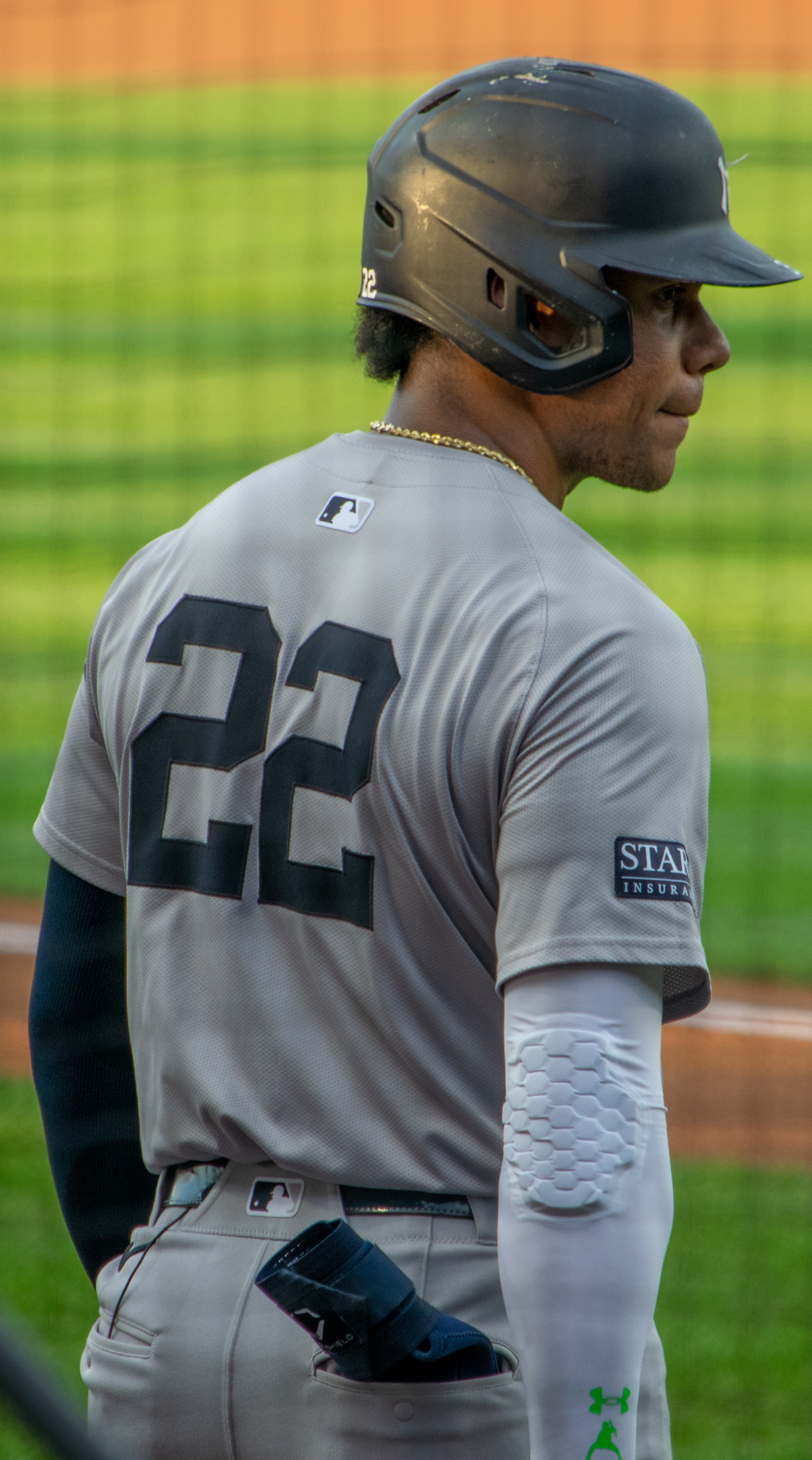
Soto with the Yankees in 2024

From March 28 to 31, Soto went 9-for-17 with a home run, a double and four RBI and also collected an outfield assist on Opening Day by throwing out the tying run at the plate on the penultimate play of the game. On April 1, Soto was named the American League Player of the Week for the first week of the season.

On June 3, following a week that included Soto slashing .435/.500/1.000, with two home runs in a game against the San Francisco Giants, including the go-ahead runs in the top of the ninth inning, he was named the AL Player of the Week for the second time. Soto was named as a starting outfielder for the American League in the 2024 MLB All-Star Game.

On August 13, Soto hit three home runs in a 4–1 victory over the Chicago White Sox, registering all four RBIs for the game. It was the first time he recorded three home runs in a single game in his career. On August 14, Soto hit a solo home run to deep right in his first at-bat and became the 6th Yankee to hit a home run in 4 straight at-bats (joining the list with Lou Gehrig in 1932, Johnny Blanchard in 1961, Mickey Mantle in 1962, Bobby Murcer in 1970, and Reggie Jackson in 1977).

On August 21, in an 8-1 victory over the Cleveland Guardians, Soto hit a two-run home run to deep center in his first at-bat for his 36th of the season, giving him a new career-high in a single season. He became the first Yankee in the expansion era (since 1961), to hit a home run for 8 straight hits (dating from August 11 against the Texas Rangers) and the first player in all of baseball since Joey Votto in July 2021. On September 17, in a 11-2 victory over the Seattle Mariners at T-Mobile Park, Soto hit a two-run homer in the 4th inning and reached the milestone of hitting a home run in all 30 current Major League stadiums. It was also his career-high 40th homer and the 200th career homer for Soto, who became the seventh-youngest player in Major League history to reach the plateau, at 25 years and 328 days old.

Soto finished the 2024 season batting .288/.419/.569 with 41 home runs, 109 RBIs, and was second in MLB in walks with 129.

On October 19, Soto hit a three-run homer in the top of the 10th inning in Game 5 of the 2024 American League Championship Series for the Yankees to take a 5–2 lead over the Cleveland Guardians. This propelled the Yankees to the World Series for the first time since 2009. They went on to lose to the Los Angeles Dodgers in five games. Soto finished the 2024 postseason batting .327/.469/1.102 with 4 homers and 9 RBIs in 14 games. Following the World Series, Soto became a free agent.

=== New York Mets (2025–present) ===
==== 2025 season ====
On December 11, 2024, Soto signed a 15-year, $765 million contract with the New York Mets, the largest contract in professional sports history. The contract gave him a $75 million signing bonus and contained a club option between 2030–2039 that would increase the base salary by $4 million per year, which if declined would allow him to opt out after the 2029 season.

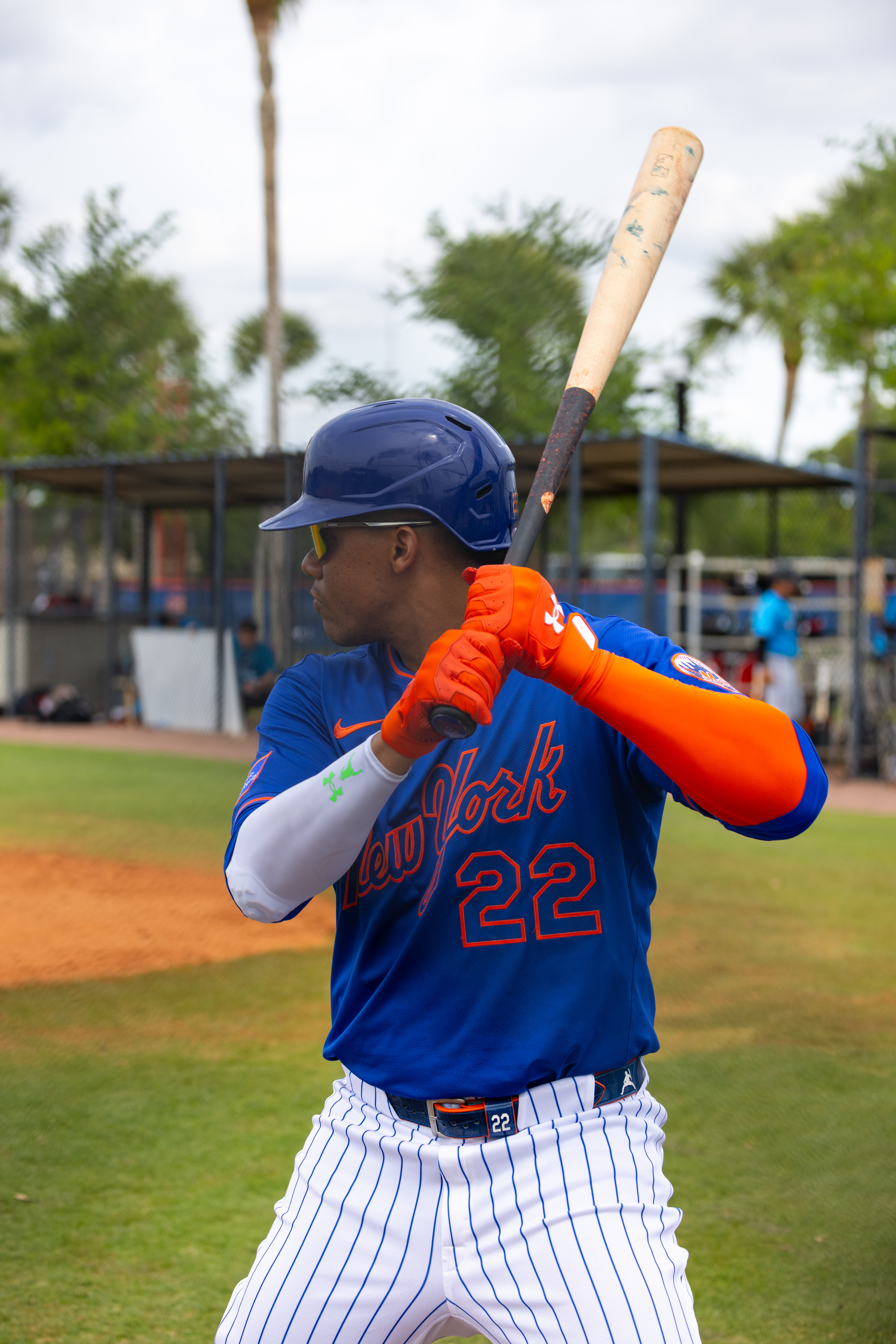
Soto with the Mets in 2025

On March 28, 2025, Soto hit his first home run as a Met, a solo shot to right field off of Houston Astros pitcher Hunter Brown, giving the Mets a 3–1 victory and their first win of the season. Soto's Citi Field debut as a Met came on April 4, during the first home game of the season. He hit an RBI double in the 6th inning, leading the Mets to a 5–0 victory over the Toronto Blue Jays. From March 27 to April 9, Soto had an 11-game on-base streak, the longest to start a season in his career. During that span, he batted .279/.404/.442 with one home run, 4 RBI, 4 doubles, and 9 walks.

On May 1, Soto hit two home runs against the Arizona Diamondbacks in a 4–2 loss. They were his first home runs at Citi Field as a Met, and it was Soto's 24th multi-homer game of his career. Soto had another multi-homer game on May 7 against the Diamondbacks at Chase Field in a 7–1 Mets victory, his second in two weeks.

On May 16, Soto made his first return to Yankee Stadium since signing with the Mets. His return to the Stadium was described on ESPN.com as "perhaps the most anticipated meeting between the clubs since the 2000 World Series." He was booed and heckled throughout the series and managed to get only one hit in three games.

On June 19 against the Atlanta Braves, Soto notched his 1,000th career hit, a single to right field off of Spencer Strider in the 1st inning. With that hit, Soto became the 84th player to reach 1,000 hits by age 26 or younger. Soto is also the 17th player to record 1,000 hits and 200 home runs before his 27th birthday, as well as the only player to reach 1,000 hits, 200 homers, and 800 walks before his 27th birthday.

On June 26, Soto hit two home runs against the Braves in a 7–3 win. It was his 27th career multi-homer game, the most in major league history by a player before turning 27, surpassing Jimmie Foxx. In the same game, Soto joined Darryl Strawberry (May 1987) as the only Mets to produce a calendar month with at least 10 homers and 20 walks. Soto was named the National League Player of the Month for June, after slashing .322/.474/.722 with 11 home runs and 20 RBI. It was the first time he earned Player of the Month in his career.

On September 9, Soto joined the 30–30 club after stealing his 30th base of the season during a game against the Philadelphia Phillies. He became the first player in 2025, and the fifth Met in history, to finish a season with at least 30 home runs and 30 stolen bases. Also, he and teammate Francisco Lindor became the third set of teammates in MLB history to ever go 30–30 in the same season, joining Howard Johnson and Darryl Strawberry (1987) and Dante Bichette and Ellis Burks (1996). On September 19 against the Washington Nationals, Soto hit his 42nd home run of the season, a three-run shot to center field off of pitcher PJ Poulin in the bottom of the 4th inning. With that homer, Soto set a new career high in home runs in a single season.

Soto finished the 2025 season batting .263/.396/.525 with a career-high 43 home runs and 105 RBI. He led the National League in OBP and stolen bases, with a career-high 38, and he led the league with 127 walks. After the season, he won his sixth career Silver Slugger Award, becoming the second player in MLB history after Mike Hampton to win in three consecutive years with three different teams.

==== 2026 season: Fifth All-Star selection ====
On May 15, 2026, during a game against his former team, the New York Yankees, Soto hit his 250th career home run off of pitcher Cam Schlittler in the 7th inning. On April 6, Soto was placed on the injured list for the first time since 2021, after straining his right calf while running the bases. He returned to the lineup on April 22. On July 4, Soto was named as a starting outfielder in the 2026 All-Star Game after leading the National League with a .406 on-base percentage and a .971 OPS. During the All-Star Game, he was one of only three National League batters to record a hit, as he singled off of Joe Ryan in the fourth inning. On July 25, Soto returned to the injured list after straining his left calf, and he was not activated again until August 29.

Across 111 games in 2026, Soto batted .275/.393/.515 with 27 home runs and 68 RBI.

== Playing style ==
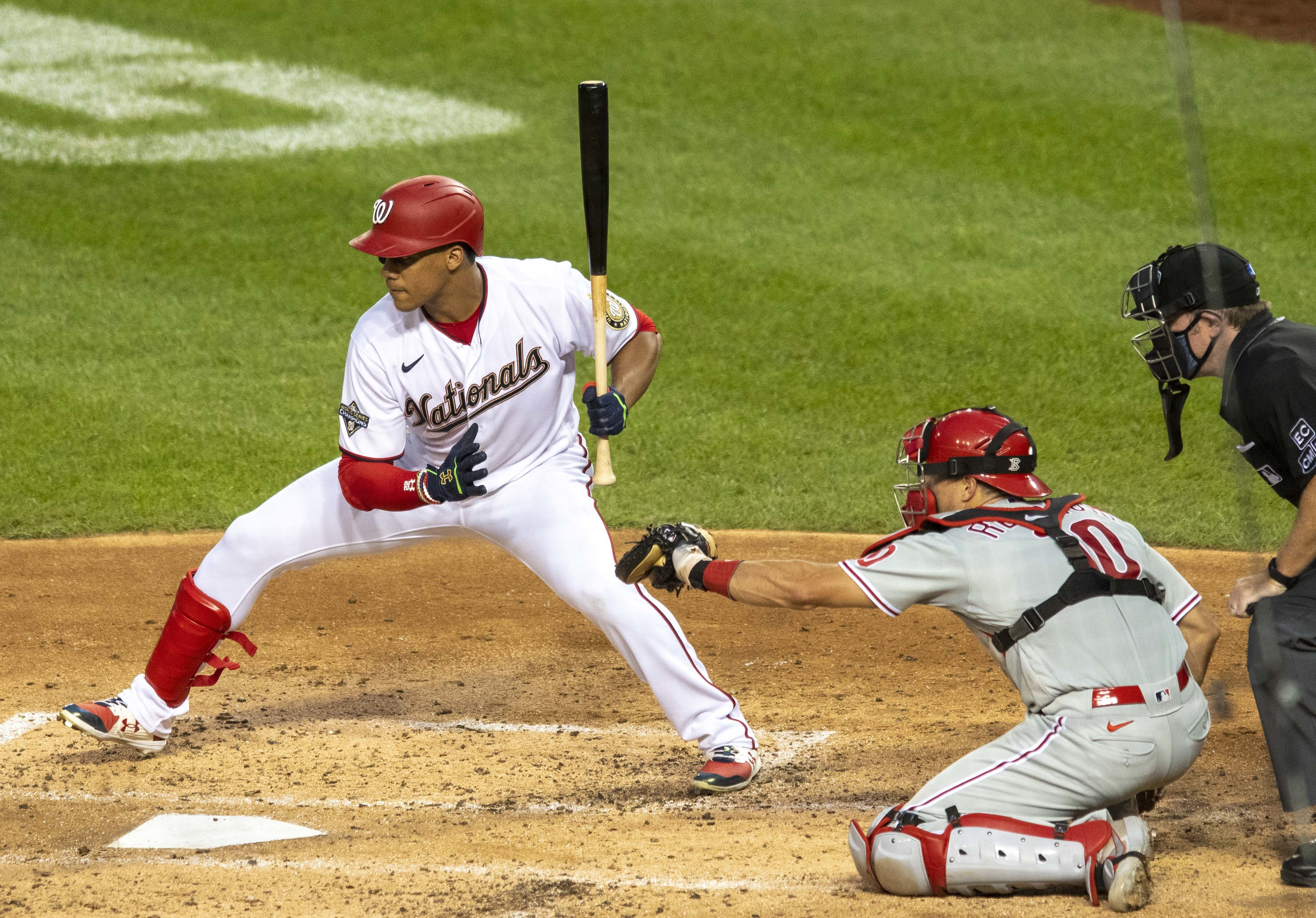
The Soto Shuffle in 2020

Soto is known for his exceptional plate discipline, ranking 5th all-time in walk rate and 17th all-time in career on-base percentage among hitters with at least 4,000 plate appearances at the conclusion of the 2024 season. During his 2018 rookie season, Soto became known for his movements in the batter's box after he successfully takes a pitch for a ball. Dubbed the "Soto Shuffle," the routine often includes Soto swinging his hips, wiping the dirt with a wide arc of his leg, tapping his leg, hopping, or lowering himself into a squat and staring at the pitcher. As an ESPN writer described it: "He'll swing his hips or spread his legs or sweep his feet or shimmy his shoulders or lick his lips or squeeze his, um, junk, sometimes all at once." Soto says he started the routine in the minor leagues "to get in the minds of the pitchers, because sometimes they get scared". In Game 1 of the 2019 National League Championship Series, St. Louis Cardinals pitcher Miles Mikolas responded to Soto's antics by grabbing his own crotch after retiring Soto on a ground out. Soto responded later by saying, "He got me out, he can do whatever he wants." In subsequent seasons, Soto eliminated crotch-grabbing from the routine.

Soto employs a "two-strike approach" in which he raises his grip along the bat handle and adopts a wider, lower stance, sometimes described as a crouch, in the batter's box. He is noted for his ability to drive the ball to all fields, even on a two-strike count. At the conclusion of the 2020 season, Soto had hit 69 career home runs in MLB and divided them evenly by direction: 23 to left field, 23 to center field, and 23 to right field.

Although he was a finalist for a Gold Glove Award as a left fielder after the 2019 season, Soto has indicated a preference for playing right field, his main position during his brief minor league career. The Nationals began deploying him as their starting right fielder late in the 2020 season, and he became the Nationals' everyday right fielder in 2021. Soto is below average at both corner outfield positions for his career, according to ultimate zone rating and Statcast metrics.

== International career ==
Soto played for the Dominican Republic national team in the 2023 World Baseball Classic. He led or tied for the team lead in hits, doubles, home runs, walks, and OPS. He also had an outfield assist against Nicaragua. One of his home runs came in a knockout loss to Puerto Rico. In 2026, Soto again played for the Dominican Republic and posted 6 hits, 2 home runs, 4 RBI, and 5 walks through 6 games and 23 at-bats. On Sunday, March 15, his team was eliminated in a 2-1 defeat to the United States, who would later lose in the tournament finals against Venezuela.

In 2021, Soto donated $200,000 to Dominican athletes in that year's Summer Olympics.

== Personal life ==
Soto's younger brother, Elian, currently plays in the Washington Nationals organization.

On coming to the United States, Soto devoted himself to learning English, and was praised as an exceptionally dedicated and quick learner.

Soto has twice given gifts to new teammates to retain his #22 uniform number. After he was traded to the Padres in 2022, he gave Nick Martinez a "really nice watch." In 2025, after signing with the Mets, he gave Brett Baty a Chevrolet Tahoe that had "thanks for #22" written on the rear windshield.

== See also ==
- 30–30 club
- List of highest-paid Major League Baseball players
- List of largest sports contracts
- List of Major League Baseball annual runs scored leaders
- List of Major League Baseball annual stolen base leaders
- List of Major League Baseball batting champions
- List of Major League Baseball career home run leaders
- List of Major League Baseball career on-base percentage leaders
- List of Major League Baseball career OPS leaders
- List of Major League Baseball career slugging percentage leaders
- List of Major League Baseball players from the Dominican Republic
- List of Washington Nationals team records
- New York Mets award winners and league leaders
- New York Yankees award winners and league leaders
- San Diego Padres award winners and league leaders

== Notes ==
Achievements
Preceded by Christian Yelich	Major League Baseball annual on-base percentage leader 2020–2021	Succeeded by Aaron Judge
Awards
Preceded by Shohei Ohtani	National League Player of the Month; June 2025	Succeeded by Kyle Stowers
