= Luke Voit =

American baseball player (born 1991)

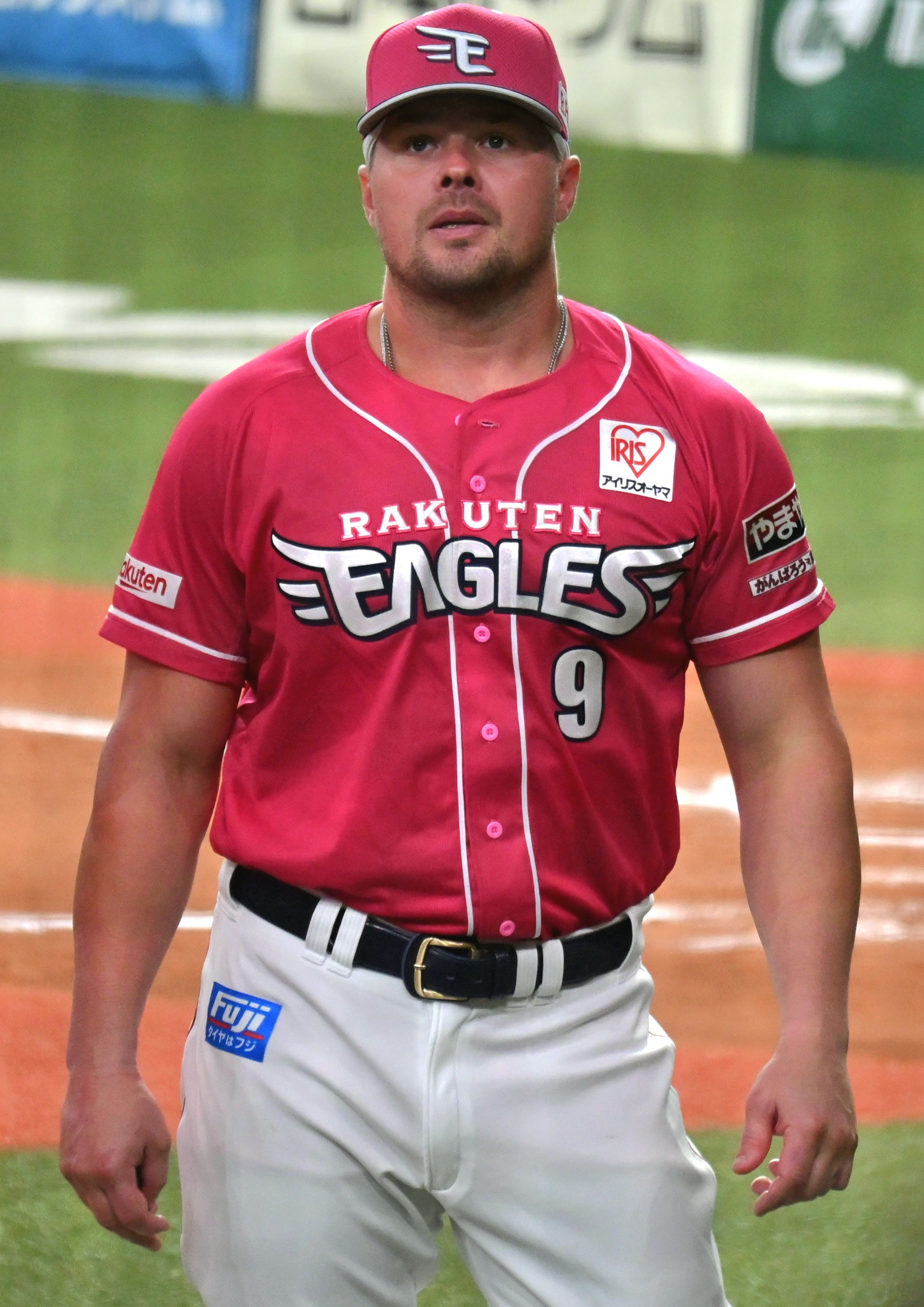
- Voit with the Tohoku Rakuten Golden Eagles in 2025

Tohoku Rakuten Golden Eagles – No. 9
- First baseman
- Born: February 13, 1991 (age 35); Wildwood, Missouri, U.S.
- Bats: Right Throws: Right

Professional debut
- MLB: June 25, 2017, for the St. Louis Cardinals
- NPB: July 2, 2025, for the Tohoku Rakuten Golden Eagles

MLB statistics (through 2023 season)
- Batting average: .253
- Home runs: 95
- Runs batted in: 276

NPB statistics (through August 21, 2026)
- Batting average: .261
- Home runs: 13
- Runs batted in: 42
- Stats at Baseball Reference

Teams
- St. Louis Cardinals (2017–2018); New York Yankees (2018–2021); San Diego Padres (2022); Washington Nationals (2022); Milwaukee Brewers (2023); Tohoku Rakuten Golden Eagles (2025–present)

Career highlights and awards
- MLB home run leader (2020)

Louis Linwood Voit III (born February 13, 1991) is an American professional baseball first baseman for the Tohoku Rakuten Golden Eagles of Nippon Professional Baseball (NPB). He has previously played in Major League Baseball (MLB) for the New York Yankees, St. Louis Cardinals, San Diego Padres, Washington Nationals, and Milwaukee Brewers.

Voit played college baseball for the Missouri State Bears and made his MLB debut in 2017 with the Cardinals. He played for them in 2018 before being traded to the Yankees during the season. By 2019, he became the Yankees' starting first baseman and in 2020, he led MLB in home runs. In August 2022, Voit was traded with several prospects to the Washington Nationals for Juan Soto and Josh Bell. He signed with the Brewers for the 2023 season.

== Amateur career ==
Voit attended Lafayette High School in Wildwood, Missouri. He played for Lafayette's baseball team as a first baseman and third baseman in his first three years, and as a catcher in his senior year. He also played on their football team as a fullback and middle linebacker.

Voit received interest from NCAA Division I teams as a football player, but shoulder injuries ended his football career. The Kansas City Royals selected Voit in the 32nd round of the 2009 Major League Baseball draft, but he did not sign. Voit attended Missouri State University, where he played college baseball for the Missouri State Bears for four years.

In 2011, Voit played collegiate summer baseball with the Harwich Mariners of the Cape Cod Baseball League, and was named a league all-star. In 2012, his junior season, he batted .298 with six home runs and 46 runs batted in (RBIs) in 62 games. However, he tore the labrum in his right shoulder and went unselected in the 2012 MLB draft. As a senior in 2013, he played in 54 games, hitting .299 with two home runs and 30 RBIs. After his senior year, the St. Louis Cardinals selected Voit in the 22nd round of the 2013 Major League Baseball draft.

== Professional career ==
=== St. Louis Cardinals ===
Voit started his professional career as a catcher with the State College Spikes of the Low–A New York-Penn League. He spent all of 2013 there, batting .242 with two home runs and 16 runs batted in (RBIs) in 46 games played. He moved to first base in 2014 and played that season with the Palm Beach Cardinals of the High–A Florida State League, where he batted .276 with nine home runs and 51 RBIs in 93 games. He returned to Palm Beach in 2015, compiling a .273 batting average with 11 home runs and 77 RBIs in 130 games. Voit spent 2016 with the Springfield Cardinals of the Double–A Texas League, where he slashed .297/.372/.477 with 19 home runs and 74 RBIs in 134 games. Voit started 2017 with the Memphis Redbirds of the Triple–A Pacific Coast League.

==== 2017 ====
On June 25, 2017, the Cardinals promoted Voit to the major leagues. In 70 games for Memphis prior to his promotion, he was batting .322 with 12 home runs and 48 RBIs.

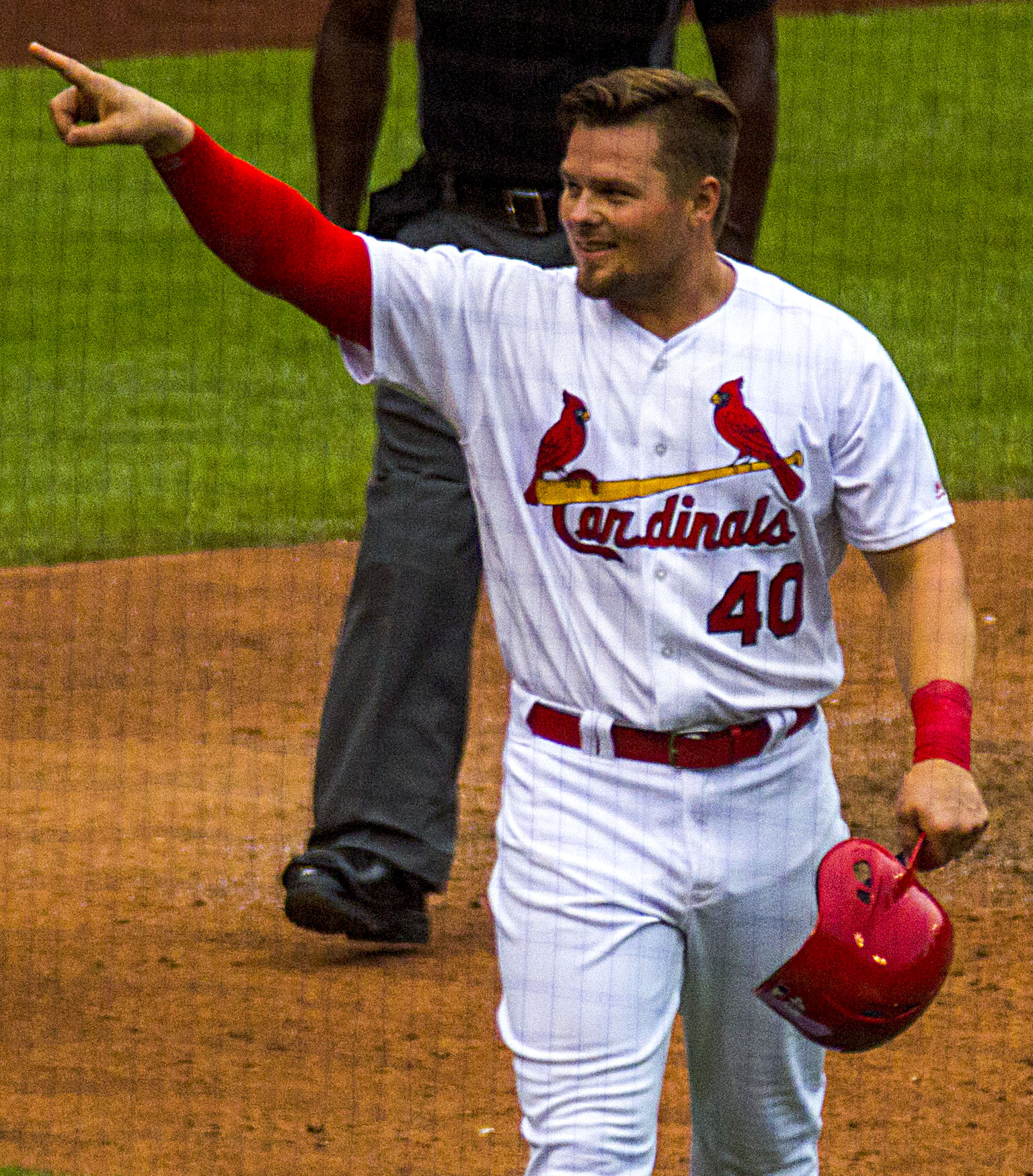
Voit during his first MLB start

He debuted against the Pittsburgh Pirates on the same night of his call-up and reached base after being hit by a pitch. Voit started the next day against the Cincinnati Reds and doubled off of Austin Brice for his first major league hit in an 8–2 win. On July 3, he hit his first major league home run. In 114 at-bats for St. Louis in 2017, Voit batted .246 with four home runs, 18 RBIs, and a .736 OPS (on-base plus slugging).

=== New York Yankees ===
==== 2018 ====
On July 27, 2018, the Cardinals traded Voit, along with bonus pool money, to the New York Yankees in exchange for Chasen Shreve and Giovanny Gallegos. The Yankees assigned Voit to the Scranton/Wilkes-Barre RailRiders of the Triple-A International League and promoted him to the major leagues on August 2. After he batted 3-for-16 (.188) in five games, the Yankees sent Voit back to Scranton/Wilkes-Barre on August 13. In his next seven games with the RailRiders, Voit batted 8-for-22 (.364). After Didi Gregorius was placed on the 10-day disabled list on August 21, Voit was called back up.

Voit took over the Yankees starting first baseman job from Greg Bird. He hit his tenth home run for the Yankees on September 20, becoming the twelfth player on the Yankees to hit 10 home runs during 2018. When Voit reached the 10-homer mark, the Yankees set a new major league team record for most players on one team with 10 or more home runs in a season. Voit was named American League's (AL) Player of the Week on October 1 after hitting .458 with three home runs and eight runs batted in during the previous week. In 2018, Voit batted .333 with 14 home runs, 33 RBIs and a 1.095 OPS (on base plus slugging) in 39 games for the Yankees.

Voit started at first base for the Yankees in the 2018 AL Wild Card Game. In the sixth inning, he hit a two-run triple off of Blake Treinen (the first triple of his career) to help the Yankees win, 7-2.

==== 2019 ====
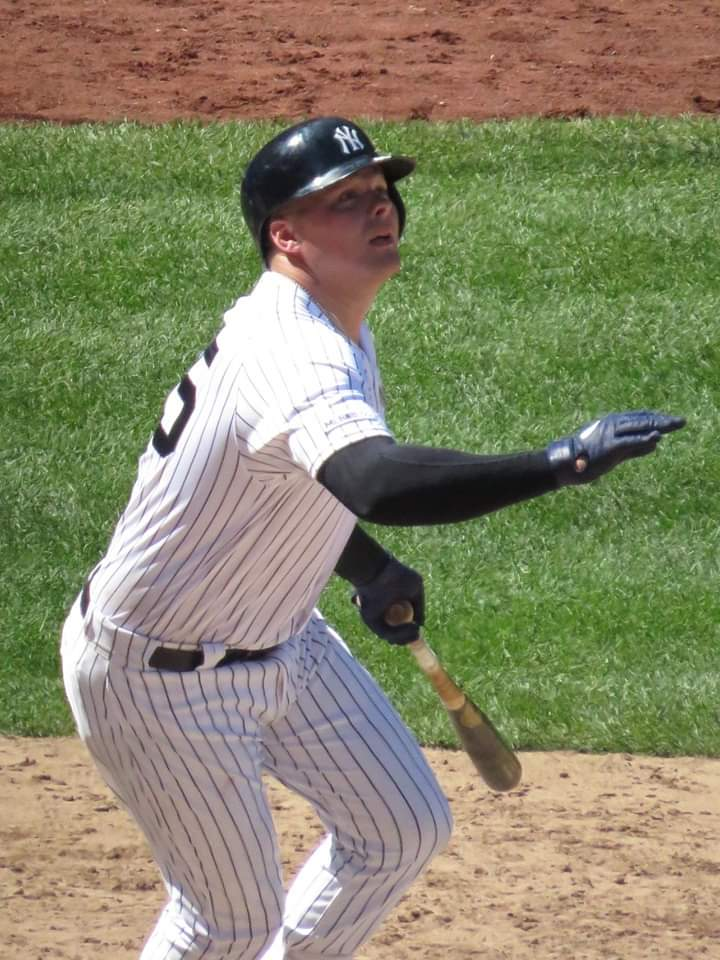
Voit with the Yankees in 2019

On April 29, 2019, Voit was named the AL Player of the Week, after hitting .433 with 13 hits, four home runs and 10 RBIs for the previous week. He went on the injured list with an abdominal injury on June 29 and was activated on August 29. In 2019, Voit batted .263/.378/.464. He made contact with the lowest percentage of pitches he swung at outside the strike zone (44.2%) of all major leaguers. After the season, Voit underwent bilateral core muscle surgery.

After the signing of Gerrit Cole, Voit announced on Twitter he would change his number from No. 45 to No 59, in honor of his brother, so that Cole could wear No. 45.

==== 2020 ====
Voit was the starting first baseman for the Yankees on Opening Day 2020. He hit his first career major league grand slam on July 30, 2020, in the Yankees' 8-6 win over Baltimore. On September 17, Voit hit his 20th home run of the season in the Yankees' 50th game, making him just the third player in franchise history to reach 20 home runs in the team's first 50 games after Babe Ruth and Mickey Mantle. Voit's home run also came in the same inning that the Yankees hit five home runs, setting a new franchise record and tying a major league record.

Voit ended the season with 22 home runs, leading the major leagues. He and Yankees teammate DJ LeMahieu, who led MLB with a .364 average, became the first pair of teammates to lead MLB in home runs and batting average since 1959.

==== 2021 ====
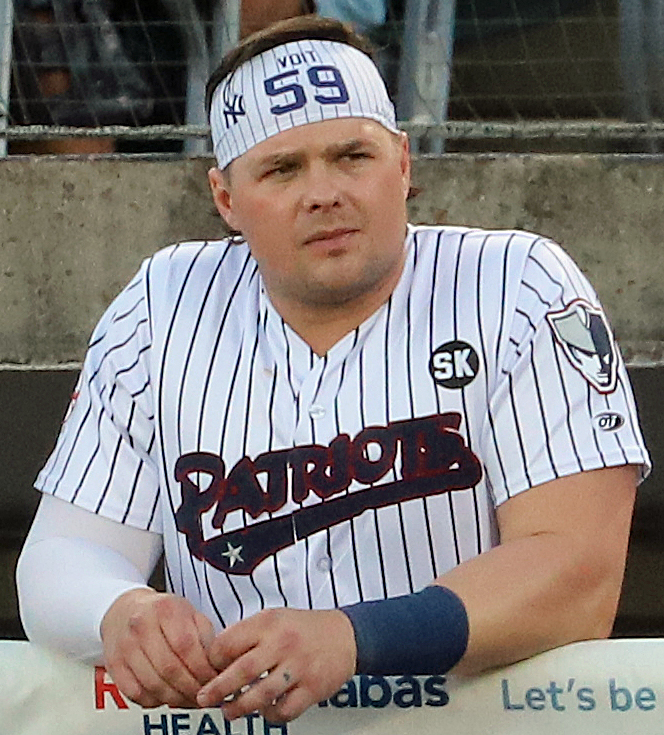
Voit with the Somerset Patriots in 2021

On March 27, 2021, it was announced that Voit had torn his meniscus in one of his knees and required surgery. He began the 2021 season on the 10-day injured list. After a rehab assignment with Triple-A Scranton/Wilkes Barre, Voit was activated on May 11, 2021. On June 23, Voit hit his first career walk-off hit, an RBI single that scored Tyler Wade to beat the Kansas City Royals 6–5.

On July 6, Voit had his first career five-hit game, going 5-for-6 with four singles, a double, three RBIs and scoring a run during a 12–1 win against the Seattle Mariners. Voit continued to be limited by injuries, leading the Yankees to acquire first baseman Anthony Rizzo at the 2021 trade deadline. Voit appeared in 68 games during the 2021 season, hitting 11 home runs in 213 at bats.

=== San Diego Padres ===
Days after the Yankees re-signed Rizzo, the Yankees traded Voit to the San Diego Padres for Justin Lange on March 18, 2022. On April 19, 2022, after he collided with Tommy Pham's teammate Tyler Stephenson at home plate while unsuccessfully trying to score, Pham offered to fight Voit.

=== Washington Nationals ===
On August 2, 2022, the Padres traded Voit, CJ Abrams, MacKenzie Gore, Robert Hassell III, James Wood, and Jarlín Susana to the Washington Nationals in exchange for Juan Soto and Josh Bell. The trade originally had Eric Hosmer go to the Nationals instead of Voit, but Hosmer invoked his no-trade clause, and Voit was traded to Washington instead.

In 2022, Voit batted .226/.308/.402 with 179 strikeouts in 500 at bats.

On November 18, Voit was non-tendered and became a free agent.

=== Milwaukee Brewers ===
On February 21, 2023, Voit signed a one year minor league contract with the Milwaukee Brewers organization with an invitation to their spring training. After he opted out of his contract and became a free agent, Voit signed a one-year major league contract with the Brewers. Voit batted .221/.284/.265 with no home runs and 4 RBI in 22 games for Milwaukee before he was placed on the injured list with a strained neck on May 15. He was activated from the injured list on May 29 and subsequently designated for assignment. Voit was released by Milwaukee on June 2.

=== New York Mets ===
On June 12, 2023, Voit signed a minor league contract with the New York Mets organization. In 37 games for the Triple–A Syracuse Mets, he batted .264/.415/.643 with 14 home runs and 35 RBI. On August 3, Voit was released by New York.

Voit re-signed with the Mets on another minor league contract on February 19, 2024. He was once more released by the Mets on March 26.

=== Olmecas de Tabasco ===
On April 28, 2024, Voit signed with the Olmecas de Tabasco of the Mexican League. In 81 appearances for Tabasco, he batted .270/.391/.554 with 23 home runs and 57 RBI. Voit became a free agent following the season.

=== Tigres de Quintana Roo ===
On April 19, 2025, Voit signed with the Tigres de Quintana Roo of the Mexican League. In 36 appearances for Quintana Roo, Voit batted .324/.432/.618 with 11 home runs and 25 RBI.

=== Tohoku Rakuten Golden Eagles ===
On June 2, 2025, Voit signed with the Tohoku Rakuten Golden Eagles of Nippon Professional Baseball. In 67 appearances for the team, he batted .300/.384/.498 with 13 home runs and 39 RBI.

On October 15, 2025, Voit re-signed with the Eagles for the 2026 season.

== Personal life ==
Voit became engaged to Victoria Rigman in October 2017, and they married in 2018. Their daughter was born in 2021. His younger brother, John, played defensive tackle for the Army Black Knights football team.
