= Justin Lange =

American baseball player (born 2001)

Free agent
- Pitcher
- Born: September 11, 2001 (age 24); Fredericksburg, Texas, U.S.
- Bats: Right Throws: Right

Justin Craig Lange (born September 11, 2001) is an American professional baseball pitcher who is a free agent. He was selected by the San Diego Padres in the first round of the 2020 MLB draft.

== Early life and education ==
Justin Craig Lange was born on September 11, 2001 in Fredericksburg, Texas, U.S.

He attended Llano High School in Llano, Texas, where he played baseball. He committed to play college baseball at Dallas Baptist University.

== Professional career ==
=== San Diego Padres ===
Lange was selected by the San Diego Padres with the 34th overall pick in the 2020 Major League Baseball draft. Lange signed with the Padres on June 24 for a $2 million bonus.

Lange did not play a minor league game in 2020 due to the cancellation of the minor league season caused by the COVID-19 pandemic. He made his professional debut in 2021 with the Rookie-level Arizona Complex League Padres. Over nine starts, he pitched to a 0–3 record, a 6.95 ERA, 29 strikeouts, and 15 walks over 22 innings.

=== New York Yankees ===
On March 18, 2022, the Padres traded Lange to the New York Yankees in exchange for Luke Voit. Lange spent the 2022 campaign with the rookie-level Florida Complex League Yankees, compiling a 3-1 record and 6.44 ERA with 51 strikeouts across 12 starts. Lange opened the 2023 season with the Single-A Tampa Tarpons and was promoted to the High-A Hudson Valley Renegades near the season's end. Over 21 starts between both affiliates, he logged a cumulative 2-5 record and 4.75 ERA with 131 strikeouts across 85 1/3 innings pitched.

Lange missed the entire 2024 season due to a shoulder injury and returned to play in 2025 in a rehab start with the Complex League before being assigned to Tampa. On February 11, 2026, Lange was released by the Yankees organization.

=== Kane County Cougars ===
On April 7, 2026, Lange signed with the Kane County Cougars of the American Association of Professional Baseball. He struggled to a 15.43 ERA with three strikeouts and three walks in 4 2/3 innings pitched as a reliever. On June 9, Lange was released by Kane County.
