= Elian Soto =

Dominican baseball player (born 2006)

Washington Nationals
- Outfielder
- Born: January 10, 2006 (age 19); Santo Domingo, Dominican Republic
- Bats: Left Throws: Right

Elian Manuel Soto (born 10 January 2006) is a Dominican professional baseball outfielder in the Washington Nationals organization. He is the younger brother of New York Mets outfielder Juan Soto.

== Career ==
Soto is a left-handed batter who plays as a third baseman and outfielder. He is represented by agent Scott Boras. In 2022, at the age of 15, Soto was scouted by the New York Mets organization. Soto's hitting power was compared to his older brother Juan, and he was expected to sign with the Mets for a $50,000 bonus. However, Soto was instead persuaded to sign as an international free agent with the Washington Nationals. Soto's decision was influenced by his brother, as Juan was promoted to the Major Leagues through the farm system of the Nationals. The Nationals also offered a larger bonus. Due to his age, Soto was not eligible to sign with the organization until 2023. Although he was not considered a "premium talent", he officially signed with the Nationals in January 2023 with a bonus of $225,000.

In 2023, Soto played 35 games with the Dominican Summer League Nationals. In 2024, he joined the Florida Complex League Nationals for 41 games. Despite his swing being praised, he only slashed .178/.319/.230 over his first two seasons. His plate discipline has been criticized, as well as his inability to steal bases.

In 2025, Soto was called up to play in a Major League spring training game between the Nationals and Mets. He hit his first professional home run as part of the FCL Nationals that May.
