= List of Washington Nationals team records =

The Washington Nationals are a United States Major League Baseball franchise based in Washington, D.C.

== Franchise records ==
What follows are the Washington Nationals/Montreal Expos team records. Records before 2005 are by Montreal Expos, records from 2005 are by Washington Nationals.

=== Single season records ===
==== Batting ====
- Batting Average: Juan Soto, .351 (2020)
- On-base Percentage: Juan Soto, .490 (2020)
- Slugging Percentage: Juan Soto, .695 (2020)
- OPS: Juan Soto, 1.185 (2020)
- At Bats: Trea Turner, 664 (2018)
- Runs: Tim Raines, 133 (1983)
- Hits: Vladimir Guerrero, 206 (2002)
- Total Bases: Vladimir Guerrero, 379 (2000)
- Doubles: Mark Grudzielanek, 54 (1997)
- Home Runs: Alfonso Soriano, 46 (2006)
- Runs Batted In: Vladimir Guerrero, 131 (1999)
- Walks: Juan Soto, 145 (2021)
- Strikeouts: Danny Espinosa, 189 (2012)
- Stolen Bases: Ron LeFlore, 97 (1980)
- Singles: Mark Grudzielanek, 157 (1996)
- Runs Created: Bryce Harper, 161 (2015)
- Extra-Base Hits: Vladimir Guerrero, 84 (1999)
- Times on Base: Juan Soto, 304 (2021)
- Hit By Pitch: Ron Hunt, 50 (1971)
- Sacrifice Hits: Larry Lintz, 23 (1974)
- Sacrifice Flies: Andre Dawson, 18 (1983)
- Intentional Walks: Vladimir Guerrero, 32 (2002)
- At Bats per Strikeout: Gary Sutherland, 25.3 (1971)
- At Bats per Home Run: Bryce Harper, 12.4 (2015)

==== Pitching ====
- ERA: Pedro Martínez, 1.90 (1997)
- Wins: Gio González, 21 (2012)
- Won-Loss %: Bryn Smith, .782 (1985)
- WHIP: Max Scherzer, 0.902 (2017)
- Games: Mike Marshall, 92 (1973)
- Saves: Chad Cordero, 47 (2005)
- Innings: Steve Rogers, 301 2/3 (1977)
- Strikeouts: Pedro Martínez, 305 (1997)
- Games Started: Steve Rogers, 40 (1977)
- Complete Games: Bill Stoneman, 19 (1971)
- Walks Allowed: Bill Stoneman, 146 (1971)
- Hits Allowed: Carl Morton, 281 (1970)
- Strikeout to Walk: Max Scherzer, 8.11 (2015)
- Losses: Steve Rogers, 22 (1974)
- Earned Runs Allowed: Steve Rogers, 126 (1974)
- Wild Pitches: Steve Renko, 19 (1974)
- Hit Batsmen: Ramón Ortiz, 18 (2006)
- Batters Faced: Bill Stoneman, 1,243 (1971)
- Games Finished: Mike Marshall, 73 (1973)

=== Career records ===
Record	All-time		Active		Currently with team	
Batting (as of November 30th, 2023)
Games played	Ryan Zimmerman	1799	Bryce Harper	927	Victor Robles	516
Batting average†	Vladimir Guerrero	.323	Trea Turner	.300	Victor Robles	.238
On-base percentage†	Juan Soto	.427	Juan Soto	.427	Victor Robles	.312
Slugging percentage†	Vladimir Guerrero	.588	Juan Soto	.538	Victor Robles	.360
OPS†	Vladimir Guerrero	.978	Juan Soto	.966	Victor Robles	.672
At bats	Ryan Zimmerman	6654	Anthony Rendon	3424	Victor Robles	1585
Runs	Ryan Zimmerman	963	Bryce Harper	610	Victor Robles	210
Hits	Ryan Zimmerman	1846	Anthony Rendon	994	Victor Robles	377
Total bases	Ryan Zimmerman	3159	Bryce Harper	1693	Victor Robles	570
Doubles	Ryan Zimmerman	417	Anthony Rendon	245	Victor Robles	78
Triples	Tim Raines	82	Trea Turner	32	Victor Robles	11
Home runs	Ryan Zimmerman	284	Bryce Harper	184	Lane Thomas	52
RBI	Ryan Zimmerman	1061	Anthony Rendon	546	Lane Thomas	165
Walks	Tim Raines	793	Bryce Harper	585	Victor Robles	109
Stolen bases	Tim Raines	635	Trea Turner	179	Victor Robles	66
Pitching (as of November 30, 2023)
Wins	Steve Rogers	158	Stephen Strasburg	113	Stephen Strasburg	113
Saves	Jeff Reardon	152	Kyle Finnegan	50	Kyle Finnegan	50
Innings pitched	Steve Rogers	2837.2	Stephen Strasburg	1470	Stephen Strasburg	1470
Strikeouts	Stephen Strasburg	1718	Stephen Strasburg	1723	Stephen Strasburg	1723
ERA ‡	Tim Burke	2.61	Max Scherzer	2.80	Stephen Strasburg	3.24
Games pitched	Tim Burke	425	Stephen Strasburg	247	Stephen Strasburg	247
Games started	Steve Rogers	393	Stephen Strasburg	247	Stephen Strasburg	247
Complete games	Steve Rogers	129	Max Scherzer	10	Stephen Strasburg	2
Shutouts	Steve Rogers	37	Max Scherzer	4	Stephen Strasburg	2
Save opportunities	Jeff Reardon; Chad Cordero	152	Kyle Finnegan	67	Kyle Finnegan	67
Caught stealing	Livan Hernandez	45	Stephen Strasburg	30	Stephen Strasburg	30
Pickoffs	Steve Rogers	26	Patrick Corbin	19	Patrick Corbin	19
Games finished	Jeff Reardon	281	Kyle Finnegan	98	Kyle Finnegan	98
Batters faced by pitcher	Steve Rogers	11702	Stephen Strasburg	5962	Stephen Strasburg	5962
Pitch count	Stephen Strasburg	22954	Stephen Strasburg	23393	Stephen Strasburg	23393
Holds	Tyler Clippard	150	Kyle Finnegan	39	Kyle Finnegan	39

† minimum of 1500 plate appearances ‡ minimum of 500 innings pitched
