= List of largest sports contracts =

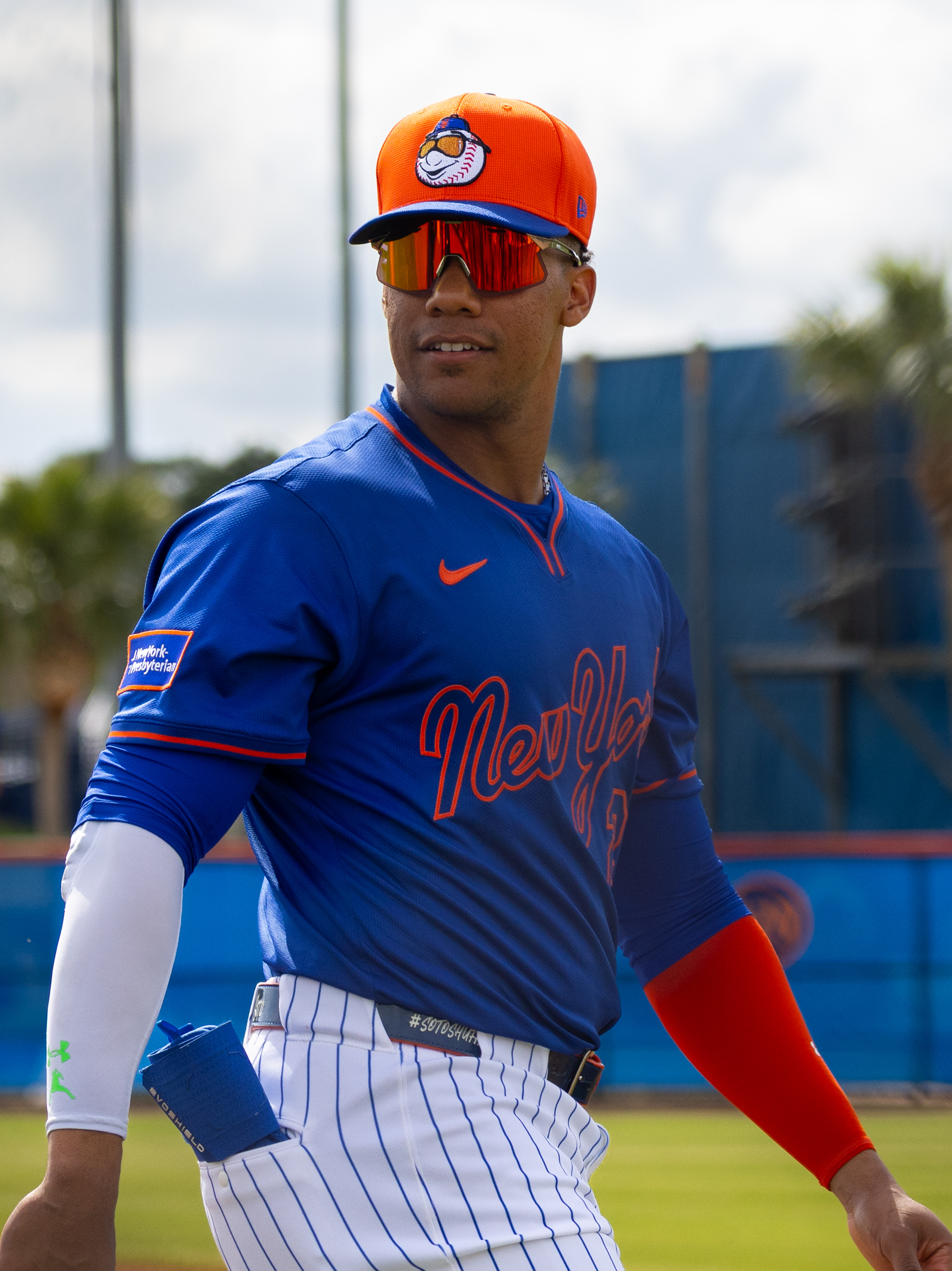
Juan Soto, signatory of the largest contract in sports

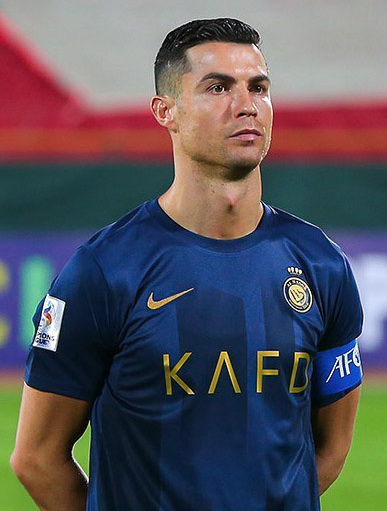
Cristiano Ronaldo has received the highest per-year salary ever, at over $355 million

This is a list of the largest sports contracts. These figures include signing bonuses but exclude options, buyouts, and endorsement deals. This list also does not necessarily reflect actual money collected by the athletes since some contracts are eventually terminated (usually due to an athlete either retiring or invoking an opt-out clause). Alex Rodriguez, Cristiano Ronaldo, Stephen Strasburg, Manny Machado, Deshaun Watson, Stephen Curry, and Giannis Antetokounmpo are on the list two times each.

Entries in this list also require an individual citation of the contract, so a number of the highest salaried athletes (according to Forbes) are not included as their contract details have not been officially confirmed, including the likes of Tiger Woods, Roger Federer, and Lewis Hamilton. This also skews the list towards sports with salary caps where salaries are therefore public knowledge and easy to cite.

The contract figures referenced below are presented at face value and do not reflect potential pre or post-tax treatments. For example, contracts with European sports teams are typically quoted on a post-tax basis.

== List ==
Overview of largest sports contracts
Name	Organization	Sport	Length of contract	Contract value (USD)	Average per year (USD)	Average per game/event (Note: Based on number of regular-season games only (excludes any playoff games). In baseball, starting pitchers usually pitch every five games, resting during the interval between starts. In association football, teams are involved in multiple competitions in a season—league matches, domestic cups, and very often continental club competitions.) (USD)	Ref.
(Dominican Republic) Juan Soto	(United States) New York Mets	Baseball	15 years (2025–2039)	$765,000,000	$51,000,000	$314,814	
(Portugal) Cristiano Ronaldo	(Saudi Arabia) Al Nassr	Association football	2 years (2025–2027)	$710,030,000	$355,015,000	$9,467,067 (Note: Based on the following data: 30 Saudi Pro League matches per season; Minimum of one match in each edition of Saudi Arabia's domestic cup competition; This count does not include preseason friendly matches, whether domestic or international.)	
(Japan) Shohei Ohtani	(United States) Los Angeles Dodgers	Baseball	10 years (2024–2033) (Note: $680 million of Ohtani's contract will be deferred until it expires. He will receive $2 million per year for the 10 years of the contract's duration, and the remaining $680 million will be paid out at $68 million per year over the following 10 years.)	$700,000,000	$70,000,000	$432,099	
(Argentina) Lionel Messi	(Spain) Barcelona	Association football	4 years (2017–2021)	$674,000,000	$168,500,000	$4,434,210 (Note: Based on the following data: 38 La Liga matches per season.; Minimum of one match in each edition of Spain's domestic cup competition, Copa del Rey.; This count does not include preseason friendly matches, whether domestic or international.)	
(Portugal) Cristiano Ronaldo	(Saudi Arabia) Al Nassr	Association football	2.5 years (2023–2025) (Note: Ronaldo's contract is two-and-a-half years starting 1 January 2023 and ending 30 June 2025. He will receive $107,668,409 for the half-season he will play from 1 January 2023 to 30 June 2023; He will then receive $214,384,204.50/season for each of the two full seasons he will play from 1 July 2023 to 30 June 2025.)	$536,336,818	$214,534,727	$7,151,158 (Note: Based on the following data: 30 Saudi Pro League matches per season; Minimum of one match in each edition of Saudi Arabia's domestic cup competition; This count does not include preseason friendly matches, whether domestic or international.)	
(United States) Patrick Mahomes (Note: Mahomes signed a 10-year extension on 6 July 2020. When the deal was first reported, it was reported as being 10 years for $503 million. It was later revealed that this amount includes the final years of the contract he was under at the time, which lasted until the end of the 2021 NFL season, and the money remaining on that contract. Mahomes signed a 2-year extension on 10 June 2026.)^{‡}	(United States) Kansas City Chiefs	American football	12 years (2020–2033)	$504,000,000	$42,000,000	$2,470,588 (Note: Reflects the expansion of the NFL regular season from 16 to 17 games in 2021.)	
(Canada) Vladimir Guerrero Jr.	(Canada) Toronto Blue Jays	Baseball	14 years (2026–2039)	$500,000,000	$35,714,285	$220,458	
(United States) Mike Trout	(United States) Los Angeles Angels	Baseball	12 years (2019–2030)	$426,500,000	$35,541,667	$219,393	
(Brazil) Neymar	(France) Paris Saint-Germain*	Association football	9 years (2017–2026) (Note: Neymar extended his original five-year contract by four years.)	$385,000,000	$42,777,778	$1,096,866 (Note: Based on the following data: 38 Ligue 1 matches per season.; Minimum of one match in each edition of France's domestic cup competition, Coupe de France.; This count does not include preseason friendly matches, whether domestic or international.)	
(Mexico) Canelo Álvarez	(United Kingdom) DAZN*	Boxing	5 years (2018–2023)	$365,000,000	$73,000,000	$33,181,818	
(United States) Mookie Betts	(United States) Los Angeles Dodgers	Baseball	12 years (2021–2032)	$365,000,000	$30,416,667	$187,757	
(United States) Aaron Judge	(United States) New York Yankees	Baseball	9 years (2023–2031)	$360,000,000	$40,000,000	$246,913	
(United States) Manny Machado	(United States) San Diego Padres	Baseball	11 years (2023–2034)	$350,000,000	$31,818,818	$196,409	
(Norway) Erling Haaland	(England) Manchester City	Association football	10 years (2025–2034)	$346,000,000	$34,600,000	$865,000 (Note: Based on the following data: 38 English Premier League matches per season.; Minimum of one match in each edition of England's domestic cup competitions, FA Cup and EFL Cup.; This count does not include preseason friendly matches, whether domestic or international.)	
(Puerto Rico) Francisco Lindor	(United States) New York Mets	Baseball	10 years (2022–2031)	$341,000,000	$34,100,000	$210,494	
(Dominican Republic) Fernando Tatís Jr.	(United States) San Diego Padres	Baseball	14 years (2021–2034)	$340,000,000	$24,285,714	$149,912	
(Netherlands) Max Verstappen	(Austria) Red Bull Racing	Auto racing	6 years (2023–2028)	$330,000,000	$55,000,000	$2,500,000	
(United States) Bryce Harper	(United States) Philadelphia Phillies	Baseball	13 years (2019–2031)	$330,000,000	$25,384,615	$156,695	
(United States) Giancarlo Stanton	(United States) Miami Marlins*	Baseball	13 years (2015–2027)	$325,000,000	$25,000,000	$154,320	
(Japan) Yoshinobu Yamamoto	(United States) Los Angeles Dodgers	Baseball	12 years (2024–2035)	$325,000,000	$27,083,333	$167,181	
(United States) Corey Seager	(United States) Texas Rangers	Baseball	10 years (2022–2031)	$325,000,000	$32,500,000	$200,617	
(United States) Gerrit Cole	(United States) New York Yankees	Baseball	9 years (2020–2028)	$324,000,000	$36,000,000	$222,222	
(United States) Jayson Tatum	(United States) Boston Celtics	Basketball	5 years (2025–2030)	$314,000,000	$62,800,000	$765,853	
(Dominican Republic) Rafael Devers	(United States) Boston Red Sox*	Baseball	10 years (2024–2033)	$313,500,000	$31,350,000	$193,519	
(United States) Jaylen Brown	(United States) Boston Celtics	Basketball	5 years (2024–2029)	$303,734,891	$60,746,978	$740,816	
(United States) Manny Machado (Note: Machado extended his contract by using an opt-out available after the 2023 season to be able to get a new deal.)	(United States) San Diego Padres	Baseball	10 years (2019–2028)	$300,000,000	$30,000,000	$185,185	
(United States) Trea Turner	(United States) Philadelphia Phillies	Baseball	11 years (2023–2033)	$300,000,000	$27,272,727	$168,350	
(United States) Bobby Witt Jr.	(United States) Kansas City Royals	Baseball	11 years (2024–2034)	$288,700,000	$26,245,455	$162,009	
(Canada) Shai Gilgeous-Alexander	(United States) Oklahoma City Thunder	Basketball	4 years (2027–2031)	$285,000,000	$71,250,000	$868,902	
(Aruba) Xander Bogaerts	(United States) San Diego Padres	Baseball	11 years (2023–2033)	$280,000,000	$25,454,545	$157,127	
(United States) Joe Burrow^{‡}	(United States) Cincinnati Bengals	American football	5 years (2024–2029)	$275,000,000	$55,000,000	$3,235,294	
(United States) Trevor Lawrence^{‡}	(United States) Jacksonville Jaguars	American football	5 years (2024–2029)	$275,000,000	$55,000,000	$3,235,294	
(United States) Alex Rodriguez (Note: Alex Rodriguez's 2014 salary was reduced to $2,868,853 due to his season-long suspension related to the Biogenesis baseball scandal.)^{R}	(United States) New York Yankees*	Baseball	10 years (2008–2017)	$275,000,000	$27,500,000	$169,753	
(United States) Brock Purdy^{‡}	(United States) San Francisco 49ers	American football	5 years (2026–2030)	$265,000,000	$53,000,000	$3,117,647	
(Serbia) Nikola Jokić	(United States) Denver Nuggets	Basketball	5 years (2023–2028)	$264,000,000	$52,800,000	$643,902	
(United States) Justin Herbert (Note: Justin Herbert's five-year extension includes $133.7 million fully guaranteed, $193.7 million with the injury guarantee and springing potentially to $218.7 million guaranteed.)^{‡}	(United States) Los Angeles Chargers	American football	5 years (2024–2029)	$262,500,000	$52,500,000	$3,088,235	
(United States) Lamar Jackson^{‡}	(United States) Baltimore Ravens	American football	5 years (2023–2027)	$260,000,000	$52,000,000	$3,058,823	
(United States) Nolan Arenado	(United States) Colorado Rockies*	Baseball	8 years (2019–2026)	$260,000,000	$32,500,000	$200,617	
(United States) Josh Allen^{‡}	(United States) Buffalo Bills	American football	6 years (2021–2028)	$258,000,000	$43,000,000	$2,529,412	
(United States) Jalen Hurts^{‡}	(United States) Philadelphia Eagles	American football	5 years (2023–2027)	$255,000,000	$51,000,000	$3,000,000	
(United States) Alex Rodriguez (Note: Rodriguez and Greinke opted out of their contracts after the 2007 and 2015 seasons, respectively.)^{R}	(United States) Texas Rangers*	Baseball	10 years (2001–2010)	$252,000,000	$25,200,000	$155,555	
(United States) Bradley Beal	(United States) Washington Wizards*	Basketball	5 years (2022–2027)	$251,000,000	$50,200,000	$612,195	
(Venezuela) Miguel Cabrera^{R}	(United States) Detroit Tigers	Baseball	8 years (2016–2023)	$248,000,000	$31,000,000	$191,358	
(United States) Anthony Rendon	(United States) Los Angeles Angels	Baseball	7 years (2020–2026)	$245,000,000	$35,000,000	$216,049	
(United States) Stephen Strasburg^{Injury}	(United States) Washington Nationals	Baseball	7 years (2020–2026)	$245,000,000	$35,000,000	$216,049	
(United States) Russell Wilson^{‡}	(United States) Denver Broncos*	American football	5 years (2022–2026)	$242,588,236	$48,517,647	$2,853,979	
(United States) Dak Prescott	(United States) Dallas Cowboys*	American football	4 years (2024–2028)	$240,000,000	$60,000,000	$3,530,000	
(Dominican Republic) Albert Pujols^{R}	(United States) Los Angeles Angels*	Baseball	10 years (2012–2021)	$240,000,000	$24,000,000	$148,148	
(Dominican Republic) Robinson Canó^{R}	(United States) Seattle Mariners*	Baseball	10 years (2014–2023)	$240,000,000	$24,000,000	$148,148	
(United States) Kyle Tucker	(United States) Los Angeles Dodgers	Baseball	4 years (2026-2029)	$240,000,000	$60,000,000	$370,370	
(Finland) Lauri Markkanen	(United States) Utah Jazz	Basketball	5 years (2024–2029)	$238,000,000	$47,600,000	$580,488	
(United States) Kyler Murray^{‡}	(United States) Arizona Cardinals	American football	5 years (2022–2026)	$230,500,000	$46,100,000	$2,711,765	
(United States) Deshaun Watson	(United States) Cleveland Browns	American football	5 years (2022–2026)	$230,000,000	$46,000,000	$2,705,882	
(Greece) Giannis Antetokounmpo	(United States) Milwaukee Bucks	Basketball	5 years (2021–2026)	$228,200,830	$45,640,166	$556,587	
(United States) James Harden	(United States) Houston Rockets*	Basketball	6 years (2017–2023)	$228,000,000	$38,000,000	$463,414	
(Canada) Joey Votto^{R}	(United States) Cincinnati Reds	Baseball	10 years (2014–2023)	$225,000,000	$22,500,000	$138,888	
(United States) Devin Booker	(United States) Phoenix Suns	Basketball	4 years (2024–2028)	$224,000,000	$56,000,000	$682,927	
(United States) Karl-Anthony Towns	(United States) Minnesota Timberwolves*	Basketball	4 years (2024–2028)	$224,000,000	$56,000,000	$682,927	
(United States) Cade Cunningham	(United States) Detroit Pistons	Basketball	5 years (2025–2029)	$224,000,000	$44,800,000	$546,341	
(United States) Scottie Barnes	(Canada) Toronto Raptors	Basketball	5 years (2025–2029)	$224,000,000	$44,800,000	$546,341	
(United States) Evan Mobley	(United States) Cleveland Cavaliers	Basketball	5 years (2025–2030)	$224,000,000	$44,800,000	$546,341	
(Germany) Franz Wagner	(United States) Orlando Magic	Basketball	5 years (2025–2029)	$224,000,000	$44,800,000	$546,341	
(United States) Max Fried	(United States) New York Yankees	Baseball	8 years (2025–2033)	$218,000,000	$27,250,000	$168,209	
(United States) David Price^{R}	(United States) Boston Red Sox*	Baseball	7 years (2016–2022)	$217,000,000	$31,000,000	$191,358	
(United States) Stephen Curry	(United States) Golden State Warriors	Basketball	4 years (2022–2026)	$215,353,664	$53,838,416	$656,566	
(United States) Zach LaVine	(United States) Chicago Bulls*	Basketball	5 years (2022–2027)	$215,200,000	$43,040,000	$656,098	
(United States) Trae Young	(United States) Atlanta Hawks	Basketball	5 years (2022–2027)	$215,159,700	$43,031,940	$524,778	
(United States) Clayton Kershaw^{R}	(United States) Los Angeles Dodgers	Baseball	7 years (2014–2020)	$215,000,000	$30,714,286	$189,594	
(United States) Christian Yelich	(United States) Milwaukee Brewers	Baseball	9 years (2020–2028)	$215,000,000	$23,888,889	$147,462	
(United States) Prince Fielder^{R}	(United States) Detroit Tigers*	Baseball	9 years (2012–2020)	$214,000,000	$23,777,778	$146,776	
(United States) Tua Tagovailoa^{‡}	(United States) Miami Dolphins	American football	4 years (2025–2029)	$212,400,000	$53,100,000	$3,123,529	
(United States) Jared Goff^{‡}	(United States) Detroit Lions	American football	4 years (2025–2029)	$212,000,000	$53,000,000	$3,117,647	
(United States) Paul George	(United States) Philadelphia 76ers	Basketball	4 years (2024–2028)	$211,584,940	$52,896,235	$645,085	
(United States) Max Scherzer	(United States) Washington Nationals*	Baseball	7 years (2015–2021)	$210,000,000	$30,000,000	$185,185	
(United States) Dylan Cease	(United States) Toronto Blue Jays	Baseball	7 years (2026–2032)	$210,000,000	$30,000,000	$185,185	
(Dominican Republic) Julio Rodríguez	(United States) Seattle Mariners	Baseball	13 years (2022–2034)	$209,300,000 (Note: Based on the following data: Based on 2022–2028 MVP Votes 0 Top 10 votes: 8 years, $200M ($25M annually) 2 Top 10 votes: 8 years $240M ($30M annually) 4 Top 10 votes: 8 years, $260M ($32.5M annually) 1 Win + 1 Top 5 vote or 3 Top 5 votes: 8 years, $280M ($35M annually) 2 Wins or 4 Top 5 votes: 10 years, $350M ($35M annually) If the team declines the 2030 option, it converts to a 5 year, $90M player option (2030–2034) Player Option Escalator: 8 combined Silver Slugger or All-Star Selections: 5 years, $100M ($20M annually) 10 combined Silver Slugger or All-Star Selections: 5 years, $110M ($22M annually) 1 MVP + 2 All-Star Selections: 5 years, $125M ($25M annually))	$17,441,667	$107,665	
(Slovenia) Luka Dončić	(United States) Dallas Mavericks*	Basketball	5 years (2022–2027)	$207,060,000	$41,412,000	$505,024	
(United States) Russell Westbrook	(United States) Oklahoma City Thunder*	Basketball	5 years (2018–2023)	$206,794,070	$41,358,814	$504,375	
(United States) Zack Greinke^{R}	(United States) Arizona Diamondbacks*	Baseball	6 years (2016–2021)	$206,500,000	$34,416,667	$212,448	
(France) Rudy Gobert	(United States) Utah Jazz*	Basketball	5 years (2021–2026)	$205,000,000	$41,000,000	$500,000	
(United States) Stephen Curry	(United States) Golden State Warriors	Basketball	5 years (2017–2022)	$201,158,790	$40,231,758	$490,631	
(Puerto Rico) Carlos Correa	(United States) Minnesota Twins*	Baseball	6 years (2023–2028)	$200,000,000	$33,333,333	$205,761	
(United States) Kevin Durant	(United States) Brooklyn Nets*	Basketball	4 years (2022–2026)	$197,656,906	$49,414,227	$602,613	
(United States) Ja Morant	(United States) Memphis Grizzlies	Basketball	5 years (2023–2027)	$197,230,450	$39,446,090	$481,050	
(United States) Klay Thompson	(United States) Golden State Warriors	Basketball	5 years (2019–2024)	$189,903,600	$37,980,720	$463,179	
(United States) Derek Jeter^{R}	(United States) New York Yankees	Baseball	10 years (2001–2010)	$189,000,000	$18,900,000	$116,666	
(United States) Micah Parsons	(United States) Green Bay Packers	American Football	4 years (2025–2029)	$188,000,000	$47,000,000	$2,764,705	
(United States) Jimmy Butler	(United States) Miami Heat*	Basketball	4 years (2022–2026)	$186,592,000	$46,648,000	$568,878	
(Greece) Giannis Antetokounmpo	(United States) Milwaukee Bucks	Basketball	3 years (2025–2028)	$186,000,000	$62,000,000	$756,098	
(France) Kylian Mbappe	(Spain) Real Madrid	Association football	5 years (2024–2029)	$186,000,000	$37,200,000	$953,846 (Note: Based on the following data: 38 La Liga matches per season.; Minimum of one match in each edition of Spain's domestic cup competition, Copa del Rey.; This count does not include preseason friendly matches, whether domestic or international.)	
(United States) Jacob deGrom	(United States) Texas Rangers	Baseball	5 years (2023–2027)	$185,000,000	$37,000,000	$228,395	
(United States) Joe Mauer^{R}	(United States) Minnesota Twins	Baseball	8 years (2011–2018)	$184,000,000	$23,000,000	$141,975	
(United States) Jason Heyward	(United States) Chicago Cubs*	Baseball	8 years (2016–2023)	$184,000,000	$23,000,000	$141,975	
(United States) Kris Bryant	(United States) Colorado Rockies	Baseball	7 years (2022–2028)	$182,000,000	$26,000,000	$160,493	
(Dominican Republic) Wander Franco	(United States) Tampa Bay Rays	Baseball	11 years (2022–2032)	$182,000,000	$16,545,455	$102,132	
(Dominican Republic) Willy Adames	(United States) San Francisco Giants	Baseball	7 years (2025–2031)	$182,000,000	$26,000,000	$160,493	
(United States) Mark Teixeira^{R}	(United States) New York Yankees	Baseball	8 years (2009–2016)	$180,000,000	$22,500,000	$138,888	
(United States) Justin Verlander	(United States) Detroit Tigers*	Baseball	7 years (2013–2019)	$180,000,000	$25,714,286	$158,730	
(United States) Kirk Cousins	(United States) Atlanta Falcons	American football	4 years (2024–2027)	$180,000,000	$45,000,000	$2,674,059	
(United States) Tobias Harris	(United States) Philadelphia 76ers	Basketball	5 years (2019–2024)	$180,000,000	$36,000,000	$429,024	
(United States) Khris Middleton	(United States) Milwaukee Bucks	Basketball	5 years (2019–2024)	$177,500,000	$35,500,000	$432,926	
(United States) Deshaun Watson^{‡}	(United States) Houston Texans*	American football	6 years (2020–2025) (Note: Contract length included the 2 years remaining on Watson's rookie contract, plus a 4-year extension worth $156 million.)	$177,500,000 (Note: Total value of remaining rookie contract plus extension.)	$29,583,333	$1,740,196	

Footnotes

^{R} – retired
^{Injury} – While still technically under contract, injury has ended his career
* – left team (or streaming service) before expiration of contract
‡ – entirety of contract salary not guaranteed
(tie) – score of two or more above mentioned athletes heretofore considered equal if their contracts have been signed within a given timeframe providing negligible inflation ratio (during the same year)

== See also ==
- List of most expensive association football transfers
- List of professional sports leagues
- Gaius Appuleius Diocles
- Salary cap

== Notes ==
- Contracts in the NFL are often not guaranteed, meaning that players who retire, or who are cut, do not receive their contracted salaries after their release from the team.
- NBA and NHL seasons span two calendar years, as do seasons in all of the richest European association football leagues.
- David Beckham signed a five-year deal with MLS soccer team Los Angeles Galaxy that was worth a reported $251 million, but that figure included commercial endorsements; only $5 million a year of that figure was salary from the club, while the rest came via existing endorsements and profit sharing with the club.
- Lewis Hamilton signed a contract with McLaren Mercedes worth at least £70 million (US$138 million) over 5 seasons (2008–2012). However, no official contract details were released by the team.
