= 2023 New York Yankees season =

Season for the Major League Baseball team the New York Yankees

2023 New York Yankees
- League: American League
- Division: East
- Ballpark: Yankee Stadium
- City: New York
- Record: 82–80 (.506)
- Divisional place: 4th
- Owners: Yankee Global Enterprises
- President: Randy Levine
- General managers: Brian Cashman
- Managers: Aaron Boone
- Television: YES Network; Amazon Prime Video (Michael Kay, Ryan Ruocco, several others as analysts)
- Radio: WFAN SportsRadio 66 AM / 101.9 FM; New York Yankees Radio Network (John Sterling, Suzyn Waldman); WADO 1280 AM TUDN Radio; Cadena Radio Yankees (Francisco Rivera, Rickie Ricardo)

The 2023 New York Yankees season was the 121st season for the New York Yankees franchise in Major League Baseball.

The Yankees re-signed general manager Brian Cashman in December 2022, and announced Brian Sabean as executive adviser to Cashman on January 2, 2023.

The Yankees, entering the season as defending AL East champions, opened on March 30 at home against the San Francisco Giants and finished on October 1 on the road against the Kansas City Royals.

Despite a strong 48–38 start, they endured several losing streaks and went 34–42 the rest of the season. They finished in fourth place in their division, 19 games behind the Baltimore Orioles, and were eliminated from playoff contention on September 24, missing the postseason for the first time since 2016.

Despite the disappointing season, they secured a winning record in their penultimate game, defeating the Kansas City Royals on September 30. Their record of 82–80 was the team's worst since 1992, but was still enough to extend their streak of winning seasons to 31 years — the longest active winning season streak in North American professional sports, which as of today, is still going on. Despite the winning record, the Yankees were outscored on the season, 698 runs allowed to 673 scored, giving them a run differential of −25 and a Pythagorean expectation of 78–84.

The Yankees drew an average home attendance of 40,862 over 80 games, the second-highest average attendance figure in the league.

== Offseason ==
=== Rule changes ===
Pursuant to the CBA, the following rule changes were instituted for the 2023 season:

- institution of a pitch clock between pitches;
- limits on pickoff attempts per plate appearance;
- limits on defensive shifts requiring two infielders to be on either side of second and be within the boundary of the infield; and
- larger bases (increased to 18-inch squares);

=== Transactions ===
==== 2022 ====
- November 15 – re-signed first baseman Anthony Rizzo to a 2-year, $34 million contract with a $17 million club option or $6 million buyout for the 2025 season (total of $51 million).
- November 18 – re-signed utility player Isiah Kiner-Falefa to a 1-year, $6 million contract.
- November 18 – claimed right-handed relief pitcher Junior Fernández off waivers from the Pittsburgh Pirates.
- December 6 – signed right-handed relief pitcher Tommy Kahnle to a 2-year, $11.5 million contract.
- December 7 – re-signed outfielder Aaron Judge to a 9-year, $360 million contract.
- December 15 – signed left-handed starting pitcher Carlos Rodón to a 6-year, $162 million contract.
- December 28 – traded left-handed relief pitcher Lucas Luetge to the Atlanta Braves for right-handed pitcher Indigo Diaz and infielder Caleb Durbin.

== Regular season ==
=== Transactions ===
==== 2023 ====
- January 29 – re-signed second baseman Gleyber Torres to a 1-year, $9.95 million contract to avoid arbitration.
- March 29 – signed outfielder / first baseman Franchy Cordero to a 1-year, split-deal contract ($1 million in the major leagues and $180,000 in the minor leagues).
- March 30 – acquired right-handed relief pitcher Colten Brewer from the Tampa Bay Rays for cash considerations.
- May 19 – acquired outfielder Greg Allen from the Boston Red Sox in exchange for minor league pitcher Diego Hernández and cash considerations.
- July 31 - acquired right-handed relief pitcher Keynan Middleton from the Chicago White Sox in exchange for minor league pitcher Juan Carela. The team also acquired right-handed relief pitcher Spencer Howard from the Texas Rangers for cash considerations.

== Game log ==
Legend
	Yankees win
	Yankees loss
	Postponement
	Eliminated from playoff race
**Bold**	Yankees team member

2023 Game Log: 82–80 (Home: 42–39; Away: 40–41)
March/April: 15–14 (Home: 9–7; Away: 6–7)

#	Date	Opponent	Score	Win	Loss	Save	Stadium	Attendance	Record
1	March 30	Giants	5–0	**Cole** (1–0)	Webb (0–1)	—	**Yankee Stadium**	46,172	1–0
2	April 1	Giants	5–7	Junis (1–0)	**King** (0–1)	Doval (1)	**Yankee Stadium**	41,642	1–1
3	April 2	Giants	6–0	**Brito** (1–0)	Stripling (0–1)	—	**Yankee Stadium**	42,053	2–1
4	April 3	Phillies	8–1	**Cortés Jr.** (1–0)	Walker (0–1)	—	**Yankee Stadium**	37,202	3–1
5	April 4	Phillies	1–4	Bellatti (1–0)	**Germán** (0–1)	—	**Yankee Stadium**	35,392	3–2
6	April 5	Phillies	4–2	**Cole** (2–0)	Nola (0–1)	**Holmes** (1)	**Yankee Stadium**	35,847	4–2
7	April 7	@ Orioles	6–7	Pérez (1–0)	**Marinaccio** (0–1)	Bautista (3)	Camden Yards	45,017	4–3
8	April 8	@ Orioles	4–1	**Brito** (2–0)	Irvin (0–2)	**Holmes** (2)	Camden Yards	30,561	5–3
9	April 9	@ Orioles	5–3	**Cortés Jr.** (2–0)	Wells (0–1)	**Holmes** (3)	Camden Yards	29,221	6–3
10	April 10	@ Guardians	2–3	Bieber (1–0)	**Hamilton** (0–1)	Clase (3)	Progressive Field	19,278	6–4
11	April 11	@ Guardians	11–2	**Cole** (3–0)	Gaddis (0–1)	—	Progressive Field	20,164	7–4
12	April 12	@ Guardians	4–3	**Peralta** (1–0)	Clase (1–1)	**Holmes** (4)	Progressive Field	23,164	8–4
13	April 13	Twins	2–11	Ryan (3–0)	**Brito** (2–1)	—	**Yankee Stadium**	39,024	8–5
14	April 14	Twins	3–4	Pagán (1–0)	**Holmes** (0–1)	Durán (4)	**Yankee Stadium**	41,039	8–6
15	April 15	Twins	6–1	**Germán** (1–1)	Mahle (1–2)	—	**Yankee Stadium**	38,363	9–6
16	April 16	Twins	2–0	**Cole** (4–0)	López (1–1)	—	**Yankee Stadium**	39,342	10–6
17	April 18	Angels	2–5	Wantz (1–0)	**Schmidt** (0–1)	Quijada (3)	**Yankee Stadium**	37,883	10–7
18	April 19	Angels	3–2 (10)	**Hamilton** (1–1)	Moore (1–1)	—	**Yankee Stadium**	38,131	11–7
19	April 20	Angels	9–3	**Cortés Jr.** (3–0)	Sandoval (1–1)	—	**Yankee Stadium**	39,315	12–7
20	April 21	Blue Jays	1–6	Kikuchi (3–0)	**Germán** (1–2)	—	**Yankee Stadium**	39,025	12–8
21	April 22	Blue Jays	3–2	**Cordero** (1–0)	Romano (2–1)	—	**Yankee Stadium**	43,223	13–8
22	April 23	Blue Jays	1–5	Gausman (2–2)	**Schmidt** (0–2)	—	**Yankee Stadium**	39,293	13–9
23	April 24	@ Twins	1–6	Gray (3–0)	**Brito** (2–2)	—	Target Field	16,242	13–10
24	April 25	@ Twins	2–6	Ryan (5–0)	**Cortés Jr.** (3–1)	—	Target Field	19,201	13–11
25	April 26	@ Twins	12–6	**Germán** (2–2)	Maeda (0–4)	—	Target Field	20,511	14–11
26	April 27	@ Rangers	4–2	**Cole** (5–0)	Heaney (2–2)	**King** (1)	Globe Life Field	31,325	15–11
27	April 28	@ Rangers	2–5	Dunning (2–0)	**Schmidt** (0–3)	Smith (3)	Globe Life Field	36,341	15–12
28	April 29	@ Rangers	0–2	Eovaldi (3–2)	**Brito** (2–3)	—	Globe Life Field	40,027	15–13
29	April 30	@ Rangers	2–15	Pérez (4–1)	**Cortés Jr.** (3–2)	—	Globe Life Field	39,078	15–14

May: 19–10 (Home: 10–6; Away: 9–4)

#	Date	Opponent	Score	Win	Loss	Save	Stadium	Attendance	Record
30	May 1	Guardians	2–3	De Los Santos (2–0)	**Holmes** (0–2)	Clase (10)	**Yankee Stadium**	33,414	15–15
31	May 2	Guardians	4–2	**Peralta** (2–0)	Karinchak (0–4)	**King** (2)	**Yankee Stadium**	32,521	16–15
32	May 3	Guardians	4–3 (10)	**Abreu** (1–0)	Stephan (1–1)	—	**Yankee Stadium**	36,060	17–15
33	May 5	@ Rays	4–5	Kelly (3–0)	**Cordero** (1–1)	Adam (3)	Tropicana Field	25,007	17–16
34	May 6	@ Rays	3–2	**Marinaccio** (1–1)	Kelly (3–1)	**Hamilton** (1)	Tropicana Field	27,078	18–16
35	May 7	@ Rays	7–8 (10)	Beeks (1–2)	**Abreu** (1–1)	—	Tropicana Field	32,142	18–17
36	May 8	Athletics	7–2	**Marinaccio** (2–1)	Sears (0–3)	—	**Yankee Stadium**	33,011	19–17
37	May 9	Athletics	10–5	**Schmidt** (1–3)	Rucinski (0–3)	—	**Yankee Stadium**	33,569	20–17
38	May 10	Athletics	11–3	**Cordero** (2–1)	Muller (1–3)	**García** (1)	**Yankee Stadium**	40,687	21–17
39	May 11	Rays	2–8	Rasmussen (4–2)	**Germán** (2–3)	—	**Yankee Stadium**	37,686	21–18
40	May 12	Rays	6–5	**Holmes** (1–2)	Adam (0–1)	**Peralta** (1)	**Yankee Stadium**	46,130	22–18
41	May 13	Rays	9–8	**Cordero** (3–1)	Thompson (1–1)	**Peralta** (2)	**Yankee Stadium**	44,714	23–18
42	May 14	Rays	7–8	Eflin (5–1)	**Schmidt** (1–4)	Adam (5)	**Yankee Stadium**	42,116	23–19
43	May 15	@ Blue Jays	7–4	**Brito** (3–3)	Manoah (1–4)	**King** (3)	Rogers Centre	28,810	24–19
44	May 16	@ Blue Jays	6–3	**Weber** (1–0)	Swanson (2–2)	**Peralta** (3)	Rogers Centre	35,112	25–19
45	May 17	@ Blue Jays	0–3 (10)	Romano (3–2)	**Peralta** (2–1)	—	Rogers Centre	27,431	25–20
46	May 18	@ Blue Jays	4–2	**Cortés Jr.** (4–2)	Berríos (3–4)	**Marinaccio** (1)	Rogers Centre	33,290	26–20
47	May 19	@ Reds	6–2	**Schmidt** (2–4)	Lively (1–2)	—	Great American Ball Park	35,177	27–20
48	May 20	@ Reds	7–4 (10)	**Holmes** (2–2)	Gibaut (3–1)	**Weber** (1)	Great American Ball Park	41,374	28–20
49	May 21	@ Reds	4–1	**Abreu** (2–1)	Greene (0–4)	**Holmes** (5)	Great American Ball Park	33,828	29–20
50	May 23	Orioles	6–5 (10)	**King** (1–1)	Baker (3–2)	—	**Yankee Stadium**	40,652	30–20
51	May 24	Orioles	6–9	Baumann (4–0)	**Cordero** (3–2)	Bautista (12)	**Yankee Stadium**	39,455	30–21
52	May 25	Orioles	1–3	Gibson (6–3)	**Schmidt** (2–5)	Canó (4)	**Yankee Stadium**	41,520	30–22
53	May 26	Padres	1–5	Musgrove (2–2)	**Vásquez** (0–1)	—	**Yankee Stadium**	46,724	30–23
54	May 27	Padres	3–2 (10)	**Holmes** (3–2)	Martinez (2–2)	—	**Yankee Stadium**	46,963	31–23
55	May 28	Padres	10–7	**Cole** (6–0)	Darvish (3–4)	—	**Yankee Stadium**	47,295	32–23
56	May 29	@ Mariners	10–4	**Germán** (3–3)	Miller (3–2)	—	T-Mobile Park	34,154	33–23
57	May 30	@ Mariners	10–2	**Cortés Jr.** (5–2)	Gilbert (3–3)	—	T-Mobile Park	26,846	34–23
58	May 31	@ Mariners	0–1 (10)	Topa (1–2)	**Marinaccio** (2–2)	—	T-Mobile Park	24,596	34–24

June: 11–12 (Home: 6–6; Away: 5–6)

#	Date	Opponent	Score	Win	Loss	Save	Stadium	Attendance	Record
59	June 2	@ Dodgers	4–8	Kershaw (7–4)	**Severino** (0–1)	—	Dodger Stadium	52,534	34–25
60	June 3	@ Dodgers	6–3	**Cole** (7–0)	Grove (0–2)	**Holmes** (6)	Dodger Stadium	52,975	35–25
61	June 4	@ Dodgers	4–1	**Holmes** (4–2)	Phillips (1–1)	**Peralta** (4)	Dodger Stadium	52,816	36–25
62	June 6	White Sox	2–3	Giolito (5–4)	**Schmidt** (2–6)	Hendriks (1)	**Yankee Stadium**	38,049	36–26
—	June 7	White Sox	Postponed (Air quality/Smoke); Makeup: June 8						
63	June 8 (1)	White Sox	5–6	Santos (2–0)	**King** (1–2)	Graveman (6)	**Yankee Stadium**	see 2nd game	36–27
64	June 8 (2)	White Sox	3–0	**Vásquez** (1–1)	Clevinger (3–4)	**Holmes** (7)	**Yankee Stadium**	40,659	37–27
65	June 9	Red Sox	2–3	Whitlock (3–2)	**Cole** (7–1)	Jansen (14)	**Yankee Stadium**	46,007	37–28
66	June 10	Red Sox	3–1	**Germán** (4–3)	Houck (3–6)	**Holmes** (8)	**Yankee Stadium**	46,061	38–28
67	June 11	Red Sox	2–3 (10)	Jansen (2–3)	**Marinaccio** (2–3)	Martin (1)	**Yankee Stadium**	46,138	38–29
68	June 13	@ Mets	7–6	**Marinaccio** (3–3)	Walker (0–1)	**King** (4)	Citi Field	43,707	39–29
69	June 14	@ Mets	3–4 (10)	Leone (1–2)	**Abreu** (2–2)	—	Citi Field	44,121	39–30
70	June 16	@ Red Sox	5–15	Jacques (1–0)	**Germán** (4–4)	—	Fenway Park	37,086	39–31
—	June 17	@ Red Sox	Postponed (Inclement weather); Makeup: June 18						
71	June 18 (1)	@ Red Sox	2–6	Pivetta (4–4)	**King** (1–3)	—	Fenway Park	36,178	39–32
72	June 18 (2)	@ Red Sox	1–4	Bello (4–4)	**Severino** (0–2)	Jansen (15)	Fenway Park	36,787	39–33
73	June 20	Mariners	3–1	**Cole** (8–1)	Kirby (6–6)	**Holmes** (9)	**Yankee Stadium**	43,130	40–33
74	June 21	Mariners	4–2	**Brito** (4–3)	Castillo (4–6)	**Kahnle** (1)	**Yankee Stadium**	41,090	41–33
75	June 22	Mariners	2–10	Woo (1–1)	**Germán** (4–5)	—	**Yankee Stadium**	42,440	41–34
76	June 23	Rangers	2–4 (10)	Barlow (1–0)	**King** (1–4)	Smith (15)	**Yankee Stadium**	44,822	41–35
77	June 24	Rangers	1–0	**Severino** (1–2)	Gray (6–3)	**Marinaccio** (2)	**Yankee Stadium**	46,018	42–35
78	June 25	Rangers	5–3	**Marinaccio** (4–3)	King (1–1)	**King** (5)	**Yankee Stadium**	46,064	43–35
79	June 27	@ Athletics	1–2	Blackburn (1–0)	**Brito** (4–4)	Moll (1)	Oakland Coliseum	13,050	43–36
80	June 28	@ Athletics	11–0	**Germán** (5–5)	Sears (1–6)	—	Oakland Coliseum	12,479	44–36
81	June 29	@ Athletics	10–4	**Schmidt** (3–6)	Harris (2–2)	—	Oakland Coliseum	14,718	45–36
—	June 30	@ Cardinals	Postponed (Inclement weather); Makeup: July 1						

July: 10–15 (Home: 7–6; Away: 3–9)

#	Date	Opponent	Score	Win	Loss	Save	Stadium	Attendance	Record
82	July 1 (1)	@ Cardinals	4–11	Flaherty (5–5)	**Severino** (1–3)	—	Busch Stadium	44,237	45–37
83	July 1 (2)	@ Cardinals	6–2	**King** (2–4)	Liberatore (1–3)	—	Busch Stadium	44,846	46–37
84	July 2	@ Cardinals	1–5	Montgomery (6–7)	**Cole** (8–2)	—	Busch Stadium	44,676	46–38
85	July 3	Orioles	6–3	**Kahnle** (1–0)	Canó (1–1)	**Holmes** (10)	**Yankee Stadium**	46,015	47–38
86	July 4	Orioles	8–4	**Schmidt** (4–6)	Gibson (8–6)	—	**Yankee Stadium**	43,876	48–38
87	July 5	Orioles	3–6	Kremer (9–4)	**Ramirez** (0–1)	Bautista (23)	**Yankee Stadium**	36,022	48–39
88	July 6	Orioles	1–14	Bradish (5–4)	**Severino** (1–4)	—	**Yankee Stadium**	39,766	48–40
89	July 7	Cubs	0–3	Taillon (3–6)	**Rodón** (0–1)	Alzolay (6)	**Yankee Stadium**	42,763	48–41
90	July 8	Cubs	6–3	**Cole** (9–2)	Smyly (7–6)	**King** (6)	**Yankee Stadium**	43,507	49–41
91	July 9	Cubs	4–7	Merryweather (2–0)	**Marinaccio** (4–4)	Alzolay (7)	**Yankee Stadium**	43,761	49–42
**93rd All-Star Game in Seattle, Washington**
92	July 14	@ Rockies	2–7	Gomber (8–7)	**Rodón** (0–2)	—	Coors Field	47,865	49–43
93	July 15	@ Rockies	6–3	**Schmidt** (5–6)	Seabold (1–7)	**Holmes** (11)	Coors Field	48,632	50–43
94	July 16	@ Rockies	7–8 (11)	Hollowell (1–0)	**Marinaccio** (4–5)	—	Coors Field	47,211	50–44
95	July 17	@ Angels	3–4 (10)	Loup (1–2)	**Ramirez** (0–2)	—	Angel Stadium	41,180	50–45
96	July 18	@ Angels	1–5	Sandoval (5–7)	**Germán** (5–6)	—	Angel Stadium	41,556	50–46
97	July 19	@ Angels	3–7	Silseth (2–1)	**Rodón** (0–3)	—	Angel Stadium	39,141	50–47
98	July 21	Royals	5–4	**Schmidt** (6–6)	Marsh (0–4)	**Holmes** (12)	**Yankee Stadium**	46,242	51–47
99	July 22	Royals	5–2	**Peralta** (3–1)	Hernández (0–6)	**Holmes** (13)	**Yankee Stadium**	44,401	52–47
100	July 23	Royals	8–5	**Severino** (2–4)	Lyles (1–12)	—	**Yankee Stadium**	44,130	53–47
101	July 25	Mets	3–9	Verlander (5–5)	**Germán** (5–7)	—	**Yankee Stadium**	46,540	53–48
102	July 26	Mets	3–1	**Rodón** (1–3)	Quintana (0–2)	**Holmes** (14)	**Yankee Stadium**	46,761	54–48
103	July 28	@ Orioles	0–1	Bautista (6–1)	**Kahnle** (1–1)	—	Camden Yards	34,558	54–49
104	July 29	@ Orioles	8–3	**Schmidt** (7–6)	Wells (7–6)	—	Camden Yards	42,829	55–49
105	July 30	@ Orioles	3–9	Baumann (8–0)	**Severino** (2–5)	—	Camden Yards	37,429	55–50
106	July 31	Rays	1–5	Glasnow (5–3)	**Brito** (4–5)	—	**Yankee Stadium**	43,613	55–51

August: 10–18 (Home: 4–8; Away: 6–10)

#	Date	Opponent	Score	Win	Loss	Save	Stadium	Attendance	Record
107	August 1	Rays	2–5	Eflin (12–6)	**Rodón** (1–4)	Fairbanks (14)	**Yankee Stadium**	38,047	55–52
108	August 2	Rays	7–2	**Cole** (10–2)	McClanahan (11–2)	—	**Yankee Stadium**	38,740	56–52
109	August 3	Astros	4–3	**King** (3–4)	Graveman (3–5)	**Holmes** (15)	**Yankee Stadium**	44,019	57–52
110	August 4	Astros	3–7	Brown (8–7)	**Severino** (2–6)	—	**Yankee Stadium**	42,105	57–53
111	August 5	Astros	3–1	**Hamilton** (2–1)	Verlander (6–6)	**Holmes** (16)	**Yankee Stadium**	41,411	58–53
112	August 6	Astros	7–9	France (8–3)	**Peralta** (3–2)	Abreu (4)	**Yankee Stadium**	46,345	58–54
113	August 7	@ White Sox	1–5	Cease (5–5)	**Cole** (10–3)	Shaw (1)	Guaranteed Rate Field	27,574	58–55
114	August 8	@ White Sox	7–1	**Schmidt** (8–6)	Toussaint (1–5)	—	Guaranteed Rate Field	26,446	59–55
115	August 9	@ White Sox	2–9	Clevinger (5–5)	**Severino** (2–7)	Santos (3)	Guaranteed Rate Field	23,377	59–56
116	August 11	@ Marlins	9–4	**Vásquez** (2–1)	Luzardo (8–7)	—	LoanDepot Park	30,978	60–56
117	August 12	@ Marlins	1–3	Alcántara (5–10)	**King** (3–5)	—	LoanDepot Park	33,980	60–57
118	August 13	@ Marlins	7–8	López (6–2)	**Holmes** (4–3)	—	LoanDepot Park	35,043	60–58
119	August 14	@ Braves	3–11	Fried (4–1)	**Schmidt** (8–7)	—	Truist Park	42,717	60–59
120	August 15	@ Braves	0–5	Elder (9–4)	**Severino** (2–8)	—	Truist Park	40,454	60–60
121	August 16	@ Braves	0–2	Morton (12–10)	**Vásquez** (2–2)	Iglesias (23)	Truist Park	40,743	60–61
122	August 18	Red Sox	3–8	Bello (9–7)	**Brito** (4–6)	—	**Yankee Stadium**	44,566	60–62
123	August 19	Red Sox	1–8	Crawford (6–6)	**Cole** (10–4)	—	**Yankee Stadium**	42,599	60–63
124	August 20	Red Sox	5–6	Martin (4–1)	**Holmes** (4–4)	Jansen (29)	**Yankee Stadium**	43,946	60–64
125	August 22	Nationals	1–2	Thompson (4–4)	**Kahnle** (1–2)	Finnegan (22)	**Yankee Stadium**	38,105	60–65
126	August 23	Nationals	9–1	**Severino** (3–8)	Gore (6–10)	—	**Yankee Stadium**	37,266	61–65
127	August 24	Nationals	5–6	Corbin (9–11)	**Kahnle** (1–3)	Finnegan (23)	**Yankee Stadium**	39,681	61–66
128	August 25	@ Rays	6–2	**Cole** (11–4)	Eflin (13–8)	—	Tropicana Field	22,679	62–66
129	August 26	@ Rays	0–3	Glasnow (7–4)	**Schmidt** (8–8)	Fairbanks (17)	Tropicana Field	22,943	62–67
130	August 27	@ Rays	4–7	Littell (3–4)	**Hamilton** (2–2)	Adam (12)	Tropicana Field	22,624	62–68
131	August 28	@ Tigers	4–1	**Severino** (4–8)	Olson (2–6)	—	Comerica Park	16,772	63–68
132	August 29	@ Tigers	4–2	**Brito** (5–6)	Skubal (3–3)	—	Comerica Park	17,236	64–68
133	August 30	@ Tigers	6–2	**Cole** (12–4)	White (2–3)	**Hamilton** (2)	Comerica Park	15,731	65–68
134	August 31	@ Tigers	3–4 (10)	Brieske (1–2)	**Loáisiga** (0–1)	—	Comerica Park	19,630	65–69

September/October: 17–11 (Home: 6–6; Away: 11–5)

#	Date	Opponent	Score	Win	Loss	Save	Stadium	Attendance	Record
135	September 1	@ Astros	6–2	**Rodón** (2–4)	Verlander (10–7)	—	Minute Maid Park	41,066	66–69
136	September 2	@ Astros	5–4	**Brito** (6–6)	Brown (10–10)	**Holmes** (17)	Minute Maid Park	41,427	67–69
137	September 3	@ Astros	6–1	**King** (4–5)	Javier (9–3)	—	Minute Maid Park	41,514	68–69
138	September 5	Tigers	5–1	**Cole** (13–4)	Cisnero (2–5)	—	**Yankee Stadium**	31,553	69–69
139	September 6	Tigers	4–3	**Schmidt** (9–8)	Brieske (1–3)	**Holmes** (18)	**Yankee Stadium**	30,673	70–69
140	September 7	Tigers	3–10	Rodríguez (11–7)	**Rodón** (2–5)	—	**Yankee Stadium**	32,722	70–70
141	September 8	Brewers	2–8	Uribe (1–0)	**Brito** (6–7)	—	**Yankee Stadium**	37,115	70–71
142	September 9	Brewers	2–9	Payamps (5–4)	**Loáisiga** (0–2)	—	**Yankee Stadium**	44,068	70–72
143	September 10	Brewers	4–3 (13)	**Misiewicz** (2–0)	Milner (2–1)	—	**Yankee Stadium**	41,702	71–72
—	September 11	@ Red Sox	Postponed (Inclement weather); Makeup: September 12						
144	September 12 (1)	@ Red Sox	3–2	**Brito** (7–7)	Pivetta (9–9)	**Holmes** (19)	Fenway Park	30,029	72–72
145	September 12 (2)	@ Red Sox	4–1	**Rodón** (3–5)	Winckowski (3–2)	**Ramirez** (1)	Fenway Park	30,392	73–72
—	September 13	@ Red Sox	Postponed (Inclement weather); Makeup: September 14						
146	September 14 (1)	@ Red Sox	0–5	Houck (5–9)	**King** (4–6)	—	Fenway Park	30,228	73–73
147	September 14 (2)	@ Red Sox	8–5	**Peralta** (4–2)	Llovera (1–2)	**Kahnle** (2)	Fenway Park	35,507	74–73
148	September 15	@ Pirates	7–5	**Ramirez** (1–2)	Holderman (0–3)	**Holmes** (20)	PNC Park	31,534	75–73
149	September 16	@ Pirates	6–3	**Brito** (8–7)	Ortiz (4–5)	**Holmes** (21)	PNC Park	31,922	76–73
150	September 17	@ Pirates	2–3	Borucki (3–0)	**Rodón** (3–6)	Bednar (36)	PNC Park	29,565	76–74
151	September 19	Blue Jays	1–7	Kikuchi (10–6)	**Schmidt** (9–9)	—	**Yankee Stadium**	38,525	76–75
152	September 20	Blue Jays	1–6	Gausman (12–9)	**King** (4–7)	—	**Yankee Stadium**	35,587	76–76
153	September 21	Blue Jays	5–3	**Cole** (14–4)	Berríos (11–11)	—	**Yankee Stadium**	37,646	77–76
154	September 22	Diamondbacks	7–1	**Weaver** (3–5)	Pfaadt (2–9)	**Brito** (1)	**Yankee Stadium**	39,143	78–76
—	September 23	Diamondbacks	Postponed (inclement weather); Makeup: September 25						
155	September 24	Diamondbacks	1–7	Gallen (17–8)	**Rodón** (3–7)	—	**Yankee Stadium**	39,018	78–77
156	September 25	Diamondbacks	6–4	**Hamilton** (3–2)	Ginkel (9–1)	**Holmes** (22)	**Yankee Stadium**	41,096	79–77
157	September 26	@ Blue Jays	2–0	**Brito** (9–7)	Romano (5–7)	**Holmes** (23)	Rogers Centre	40,454	80–77
158	September 27	@ Blue Jays	6–0	**Cole** (15–4)	Berríos (11–12)	—	Rogers Centre	31,923	81–77
159	September 28	@ Blue Jays	0–6	Bassitt (16–8)	**Weaver** (3–6)	—	Rogers Centre	36,657	81–78
160	September 29	@ Royals	5–12	Lyles (6–17)	**Rodón** (3–8)	—	Kauffman Stadium	18,374	81–79
161	September 30	@ Royals	5–2	**Montas** (1–0)	Marsh (3–9)	**Holmes** (24)	Kauffman Stadium	22,665	82–79
162	October 1	@ Royals	2–5	Greinke (2–15)	**King** (4–8)	McArthur (4)	Kauffman Stadium	20,662	82–80

== Season standings ==
=== American League East ===
AL East
Team	W	L	Pct.	GB	Home	Road
Baltimore Orioles	101	61	.623	—	49‍–‍32	52‍–‍29
Tampa Bay Rays	99	63	.611	2	53‍–‍28	46‍–‍35
Toronto Blue Jays	89	73	.549	12	43‍–‍38	46‍–‍35
New York Yankees	82	80	.506	19	42‍–‍39	40‍–‍41
Boston Red Sox	78	84	.481	23	39‍–‍42	39‍–‍42

=== American League Wild Card ===
Division leaders
Team	W	L	Pct.
Baltimore Orioles	101	61	.623
Houston Astros	90	72	.556
Minnesota Twins	87	75	.537

Wild Card teams (Top 3 teams qualify for postseason)
Team	W	L	Pct.	GB
Tampa Bay Rays	99	63	.611	+10
Texas Rangers	90	72	.556	+1
Toronto Blue Jays	89	73	.549	—
Seattle Mariners	88	74	.543	1
New York Yankees	82	80	.506	7
Boston Red Sox	78	84	.481	11
Detroit Tigers	78	84	.481	11
Cleveland Guardians	76	86	.469	13
Los Angeles Angels	73	89	.451	16
Chicago White Sox	61	101	.377	28
Kansas City Royals	56	106	.346	33
Oakland Athletics	50	112	.309	39

=== Record vs. opponents ===
==== Record vs. American League ====
2023 American League record Source: MLB Standings Grid – 2023
Team	BAL	BOS	CWS	CLE	DET	HOU	KC	LAA	MIN	NYY	OAK	SEA	TB	TEX	TOR	NL
Baltimore	—	7–6	4–2	3–4	6–1	3–3	5–1	5–2	4–2	7–6	6–1	4–2	8–5	3–3	10–3	26–20
Boston	6–7	—	2–4	3–3	5–1	2–5	5–2	3–4	4–3	9–4	4–2	3–3	2–11	3–3	7–6	20–26
Chicago	2–4	4–2	—	8–5	5–8	3–4	6–7	3–4	4–9	4–2	3–4	2–4	1–6	1–5	0–6	15–31
Cleveland	4–3	3–3	5–8	—	4–9	2–4	7–6	3–4	7–6	2–4	5–1	4–3	3–3	3–3	4–3	20–26
Detroit	1–6	1–5	8–5	9–4	—	3–3	10–3	3–3	8–5	2–5	3–4	3–3	1–5	3–4	2–4	21–25
Houston	3–3	5–2	4–3	4–2	3–3	—	1–5	9–4	2–4	2–5	10–3	4–9	3–3	9–4	3–4	28–18
Kansas City	1–5	2–5	7–6	6–7	3–10	5–1	—	2–4	4–9	2–4	2–4	1–6	3–4	1–5	1–6	16–30
Los Angeles	2–5	4–3	4–3	4–3	3–3	4–9	4–2	—	3–3	4–2	7–6	5–8	2–4	6–7	2–4	19–27
Minnesota	2–4	3–4	9–4	6–7	5–8	4–2	9–4	3–3	—	4–3	5–1	3–4	1–5	5–2	3–3	25–21
New York	6–7	4–9	2–4	4–2	5–2	5–2	4–2	2–4	3–4	—	5–1	4–2	5–8	3–4	7–6	23–23
Oakland	1–6	2–4	4–3	1–5	4–3	3–10	4–2	6–7	1–5	1–5	—	1–12	2–5	4–9	2–4	14–32
Seattle	2–4	3–3	4–2	3–4	3–3	9–4	6–1	8–5	4–3	2–4	12–1	—	3–4	4–9	3–3	22–24
Tampa Bay	5–8	11–2	6–1	3–3	5–1	3–3	4–3	4–2	5–1	8–5	5–2	4–3	—	2–4	7–6	27–19
Texas	3–3	3–3	5–1	3–3	4–3	4–9	5–1	7–6	2–5	4–3	9–4	9–4	4–2	—	6–1	22–24
Toronto	3–10	6–7	6–0	3–4	4–2	4–3	6–1	4–2	3–3	6–7	4–2	3–3	6–7	1–6	—	30–16

Updated with the results of all games through October 1, 2023.

==== Record vs. National League ====
2023 American League record vs. National League Source: MLB Standings
Team	ARI	ATL	CHC	CIN	COL	LAD	MIA	MIL	NYM	PHI	PIT	SD	SF	STL	WSH
Baltimore	2–1	1–2	1–2	1–2	2–1	1–2	3–0	1–2	3–0	1–2	2–1	1–2	2–1	1–2	4–0
Boston	2–1	3–1	2–1	1–2	1–2	1–2	0–3	2–1	2–1	2–1	0–3	2–1	1–2	0–3	1–2
Chicago	1–2	2–1	1–3	2–1	1–2	1–2	1–2	0–3	1–2	1–2	1–2	0–3	1–2	1–2	1–2
Cleveland	1–2	1–2	2–1	2–2	1–2	1–2	1–2	1–2	0–3	2–1	2–1	1–2	1–2	2–1	2–1
Detroit	0–3	1–2	1–2	1–2	2–1	1–2	1–2	2–1	3–0	0–3	2–2	1–2	3–0	2–1	1–2
Houston	3–0	3–0	3–0	0–3	3–1	1–2	2–1	1–2	2–1	1–2	2–1	2–1	1–2	2–1	2–1
Kansas City	1–2	0–3	1–2	0–3	1–2	2–1	0–3	0–3	3–0	1–2	0–3	2–1	2–1	2–2	1–2
Los Angeles	1–2	1–2	3–0	0–3	1–2	0–4	0–3	1–2	2–1	1–2	2–1	0–3	2–1	3–0	2–1
Minnesota	3–0	0–3	2–1	2–1	2–1	1–2	1–2	2–2	2–1	2–1	2–1	2–1	1–2	2–1	1–2
New York	2–1	0–3	1–2	3–0	1–2	2–1	1–2	1–2	2–2	2–1	2–1	2–1	2–1	1–2	1–2
Oakland	1–2	2–1	0–3	1–2	2–1	0–3	0–3	3–0	0–3	0–3	2–1	0–3	2–2	1–2	0–3
Seattle	2–1	1–2	1–2	1–2	3–0	0–3	2–1	0–3	1–2	1–2	2–1	3–1	2–1	2–1	1–2
Tampa Bay	2–1	1–2	1–2	2–1	3–0	2–1	3–1	2–1	1–2	0–3	3–0	1–2	2–1	1–2	3–0
Texas	1–3	1–2	1–2	0–3	3–0	1–2	3–0	0–3	2–1	3–0	2–1	0–3	2–1	2–1	1–2
Toronto	3–0	3–0	1–2	2–1	2–1	2–1	2–1	2–1	3–0	1–3	3–0	1–2	2–1	1–2	2–1

Updated with the results of all games through October 1, 2023.

== Roster ==
2023 New York Yankees
Roster
Pitchers: 84 Albert Abreu; 50 Matt Bowman; 54 Colten Brewer; 76 Jhony Brito; 45 Gerrit Cole; 70 Jimmy Cordero; 65 Nestor Cortés Jr.; 83 Deivi García; 0 Domingo Germán; 94 Yoendrys Gómez; 71 Ian Hamilton; 35 Clay Holmes; 41 Tommy Kahnle; 34 Michael King; 92 Matt Krook; 43 Jonathan Loáisiga; 97 Ron Marinaccio; 29 Zach McAllister; 93 Keynan Middleton; 54 Anthony Misiewicz; 47 Frankie Montas; 58 Wandy Peralta; 63 Nick Ramirez; 55 Carlos Rodón; 36 Clarke Schmidt; 40 Luis Severino; 98 Randy Vásquez; 30 Luke Weaver; 62 Ryan Weber; 85 Greg Weissert	Catchers: 66 Kyle Higashioka; 38 Ben Rortvedt; 39 Jose Trevino; 88 Austin Wells; Infielders: 28 Josh Donaldson; 26 DJ LeMahieu; 91 Oswald Peraza; 48 Anthony Rizzo; 25 Gleyber Torres; 11 Anthony Volpe	Outfielders: 30 Greg Allen; 22 Harrison Bader; 61 Jake Bauers; 95 Oswaldo Cabrera; 24 Willie Calhoun; 33 Franchy Cordero; 89 Jasson Domínguez; 90 Estevan Florial; 31 Aaron Hicks; 99 Aaron Judge (captain); 12 Isiah Kiner-Falefa; 57 Billy McKinney; 80 Everson Pereira; 27 Giancarlo Stanton	Manager: 17 Aaron Boone; Coaches: 77 Matt Blake (pitching); 72 Sean Casey (hitting); 75 Travis Chapman (first base/infield); 79 Desi Druschel (assistant pitching); 78 Casey Dykes (assistant hitting); 60 Mike Harkey (bullpen); 64 Carlos Mendoza (bench); 67 Luis Rojas (third base/outfield); 73 Tanner Swanson (quality control/catching); 68 Brad Wilkerson (assistant hitting)

== Player statistics ==
= Indicates team leader

= Indicates league leader

=== Batting ===
Note: G = Games played; AB = At bats; R = Runs; H = Hits; 2B = Doubles; 3B = Triples; HR = Home runs; RBI = Runs batted in; SB = Stolen bases; BB = Walks; AVG = Batting average; SLG = Slugging average

Player	G	AB	R	H	2B	3B	HR	RBI	SB	BB	AVG	SLG
Gleyber Torres	158	596	90	163	28	2	25	68	13	67	.273	.453
Anthony Volpe	159	541	62	113	23	4	21	60	24	52	.209	.383
DJ LeMahieu	136	497	55	121	22	3	15	44	2	60	.243	.390
Anthony Rizzo	99	373	45	91	14	0	12	41	0	35	.244	.378
Giancarlo Stanton	101	371	43	71	13	0	24	60	0	41	.191	.420
Aaron Judge	106	367	79	98	16	0	37	75	3	88	.267	.613
Isiah Kiner-Falefa	113	326	39	79	12	1	6	37	14	28	.242	.340
Oswaldo Cabrera	115	298	35	63	11	0	5	29	8	25	.211	.299
Harrison Bader	84	288	40	69	11	2	7	37	17	14	.240	.365
Kyle Higashioka	92	242	24	57	13	0	10	34	0	14	.236	.413
Jake Bauers	84	242	28	49	15	0	12	30	3	27	.202	.413
Oswald Peraza	52	173	15	33	8	0	2	14	4	13	.191	.272
Jose Trevino	55	157	15	33	4	0	4	15	0	8	.210	.312
Willie Calhoun	44	134	16	32	7	0	5	16	0	14	.239	.403
Billy McKinney	48	128	19	29	3	1	6	14	1	17	.227	.406
Josh Donaldson	33	106	13	15	1	0	10	15	0	12	.142	.434
Everson Pereira	27	93	6	14	4	0	0	10	4	8	.151	.194
Austin Wells	19	70	8	16	6	0	4	13	0	3	.229	.486
Aaron Hicks	28	69	9	13	2	0	1	5	0	7	.188	.261
Franchy Cordero	24	69	9	13	2	0	6	13	0	2	.188	.478
Ben Rortvedt	32	68	6	8	1	0	2	4	0	11	.118	.221
Estevan Florial	19	61	5	14	3	1	0	8	3	7	.230	.311
Jasson Domínguez	8	31	6	8	1	0	4	7	1	2	.258	.677
Greg Allen	22	23	6	5	1	1	1	1	3	2	.217	.478
Totals	162	5323	673	1207	221	15	219	650	100	557	.227	.397
Rank in AL	—	14	11	14	15	13	6	11	9	3	14	11

Source:Baseball Reference

=== Pitching ===
Note: W = Wins; L = Losses; ERA = Earned run average; G = Games pitched; GS = Games started; SV = Saves; IP = Innings pitched; H = Hits allowed; R = Runs allowed; ER = Earned runs allowed; BB = Walks allowed; SO = Strikeouts

Player	W	L	ERA	G	GS	SV	IP	H	R	ER	BB	SO
Gerrit Cole	15	4	2.63	33	33	0	209.0	157	64	61	48	222
Clarke Schmidt	9	9	4.64	33	32	0	159.0	169	91	82	46	149
Domingo Germán	5	7	4.56	20	19	0	108.2	83	61	55	34	114
Michael King	4	8	2.75	49	9	6	104.2	88	35	32	32	127
Jhony Brito	9	7	4.28	25	13	1	90.1	82	47	43	28	72
Luis Severino	4	8	6.65	19	18	0	89.1	113	73	66	34	79
Carlos Rodón	3	8	6.85	14	14	0	64.1	68	51	49	28	64
Nestor Cortés Jr.	5	2	4.97	12	12	0	63.1	59	36	35	20	67
Clay Holmes	4	4	2.86	66	0	24	63.0	51	22	20	23	71
Albert Abreu	2	2	4.73	45	0	0	59.0	52	39	31	35	61
Ian Hamilton	3	2	2.64	39	3	2	58.0	45	19	17	26	69
Wandy Peralta	4	2	2.83	63	0	4	54.0	36	19	17	30	51
Ron Marinaccio	4	5	3.99	45	0	2	47.1	38	24	21	27	56
Nick Ramirez	1	2	2.66	32	0	1	40.2	41	17	12	9	28
Tommy Kahnle	1	3	2.66	42	0	2	40.2	26	14	12	19	48
Randy Vásquez	2	2	2.87	11	5	0	37.2	30	12	12	18	33
Jimmy Cordero	3	2	3.86	31	1	0	32.2	25	14	14	10	34
Greg Weissert	0	0	4.05	17	0	0	20.0	21	9	9	8	22
Jonathan Loáisiga	0	2	3.06	17	0	0	17.2	14	7	6	1	6
Keynan Middleton	0	0	1.88	12	0	0	14.1	7	3	3	7	17
Ryan Weber	1	0	3.14	8	0	1	14.1	17	5	5	1	7
Luke Weaver	1	1	3.38	3	3	0	13.1	14	5	5	3	16
Colten Brewer	0	0	4.32	3	0	0	8.1	6	4	4	3	4
Deivi García	0	0	1.59	2	0	1	5.2	4	1	1	4	3
Zach McAllister	0	0	10.13	7	0	0	5.1	9	7	6	2	5
Matt Krook	0	0	24.75	4	0	0	4.0	8	11	11	6	3
Isiah Kiner-Falefa	0	0	2.25	4	0	0	4.0	4	1	1	0	1
Matt Bowman	0	0	9.00	3	0	0	4.0	6	4	4	2	3
Anthony Misiewicz	1	0	3.38	3	0	0	2.2	2	3	1	3	2
Yoendrys Gómez	0	0	0.00	1	0	0	2.0	1	0	0	0	4
Frankie Montas	1	0	0.00	1	0	0	1.1	2	0	0	1	1
Josh Donaldson	0	0	0.00	1	0	0	1.0	0	0	0	0	0
Totals	82	80	3.97	162	162	44	1439.2	1272	698	635	508	1439
Rank in AL	8	8	8	—	—	5	9	2	7	7	9	8

Source:Baseball Reference

== Farm system ==
Level	Team	League	Manager
AAA	Scranton/Wilkes-Barre RailRiders	International League	Shelley Duncan
AA	Somerset Patriots	Eastern League	Raul Dominguez
High-A	Hudson Valley Renegades	South Atlantic League	Sergio Santos
Low-A	Tampa Tarpons	Florida State League	Rachel Balkovec
Rookie	FCL Yankees	Florida Complex League	Sergio Santos
Rookie	DSL Yankees 1	Dominican Summer League	Victor Rey
Rookie	DSL Yankees 2	Dominican Summer League	Victor Rey
