= A. J. Preller =

American baseball executive (born 1977)

San Diego Padres
- President of baseball operations and general manager
- Born: June 20, 1977 (age 49); New York City, U.S.

Teams
- Philadelphia Phillies (1998); Los Angeles Dodgers (2001–2004); Texas Rangers (2004–2014); San Diego Padres (2014–present)

A. J. Preller (born June 20, 1977) is an American professional baseball executive who is the president of baseball operations and general manager of the San Diego Padres of Major League Baseball (MLB). He was hired by the Padres on August 5, 2014, while serving as the assistant general manager for the Texas Rangers, overseeing the player development and scouting departments and serving as a key advisor on all player acquisitions. At the time, he was 37 years old.

== Early years ==
Preller was born on June 20, 1977, in New York City, to parents Arthur and Joan. He grew up in South Huntington, New York, on Long Island. He attended Walt Whitman High School, where he graduated in 1995.

He attended Cornell University, where he met Jon Daniels, and graduated summa cum laude with a B.S. degree in 1999. After graduation, he served as an intern with the Philadelphia Phillies before joining the front office of the Los Angeles Dodgers, and also worked for Major League Baseball.

== Front office career ==
=== Texas Rangers ===
In 2004, Preller was hired as Director of International and Professional Scouting by the Texas Rangers. While at Cornell, he was a fraternity brother of former Rangers general manager Jon Daniels. Preller reached the position of assistant GM with the Rangers before leaving for San Diego.

=== San Diego Padres ===
On August 6, 2014, the San Diego Padres announced the hiring of Preller as their new general manager. His hiring concluded a six-week process that commenced on June 22 after San Diego dismissed Josh Byrnes following a two-plus year tenure, with Preller agreeing to a five-year deal. The Padres also interviewed Kim Ng, Billy Eppler, and Mike Hazen. Preller made numerous transactions over the 2014-2015 offseason in what came to be known as "Prellerpalooza." He traded Yasmani Grandal to the Los Angeles Dodgers for Matt Kemp and Tim Federowicz. He partook in a three team trade for Wil Myers and Ryan Hanigan, surrendering five players (including Trea Turner) in the process. He traded prospects to the Braves for Justin Upton. He signed James Shields to a 4-year contract. He made several smaller moves as well, as he launched the Padres into playoff talks before the season began. He concluded the offseason by trading for Braves closer Craig Kimbrel just hours before the season opened on April 5.

Despite his off-season trades, the Padres in June 2015 were still underperforming. This was one of many factors that led to the firing of manager Bud Black on June 15, 2015.

On September 15, 2016, Preller was suspended for 30 days by MLB without pay for failing to disclose medical information, regarding the trade that sent Drew Pomeranz to the Red Sox.

On December 3, 2017, Preller was given a three-year extension to remain as the Padres general manager.

In 2018, MLB Pipeline ranked the Padres farm system No. 1 with seven prospects among their top 100 prospects: Fernando Tatís Jr. (No. 8), MacKenzie Gore (No. 19), Luis Urías (No. 36), Cal Quantrill (No. 40), Michel Báez (No. 42), Adrian Morejón (No. 50), and Anderson Espinoza (No. 89).

On February 19, 2018, the Padres signed Eric Hosmer to an eight-year, $144 million contract, the largest in club history at the time. On February 21, 2019, the Padres signed Manny Machado to a 10-year, $300 million contract, at the time the biggest free-agent contract in the history of American sports.

In 2020, the Padres went 37–23, finishing with a winning record for the first time since 2010. They went on to the playoffs, marking their first postseason appearance since 2006 and defeated the St. Louis Cardinals in the 2020 National League Wild Card Series, their first postseason series win since the 1998 NLCS.

On February 2, 2021, the Padres extended Preller through the 2026 season and promoted him to president of baseball operations. On February 17, the Padres extended Tatís to a 14-year, $340 million contract, at the time the third-biggest deal in MLB history. On November 1, the Padres announced Bob Melvin would be the team's new manager, replacing the fired Jayce Tingler.

On August 2, 2022, Preller completed a blockbuster trade with the Washington Nationals for Right fielder Juan Soto and First baseman Josh Bell. In exchange, the Nationals received Luke Voit and top prospects CJ Abrams, MacKenzie Gore, Robert Hassell III, James Wood, and Jarlin Susana. On December 9, 2022, Preller signed longtime Boston Red Sox Shortstop Xander Bogaerts to an 11-year, $280-million contract.

In March 2023, Diamond Sports Group, the parent company to Bally Sports, filed for Chapter 11 bankruptcy after failing to make a $140 million interest payment. The Padres were one of two teams whom Bally entered into grace periods for making their payments, with MLB itself taking over broadcasting operations and paying the Padres 80% of their contracted TV revenue. After the conclusion of the 2023 season in which the Padres missed the playoffs despite a strong run differential, it was revealed that the Padres took out a $50 million loan to cover payroll for the final part of the season. Shortly after that, Padres chairman Peter Seidler died. The TV deal fallout paired with ownership uncertainty resulted in the Padres deciding to shed financial commitments in the 2023-24 offseason. With Juan Soto projected to make north of $30 million in his final year of arbitration, Preller and the Padres put Soto on the trade bloc. Despite Soto's status as a star player, his lone remaining year of team control and high-end salary limited his market to only a few big market clubs. Ultimately, Preller traded Soto and Trent Grisham to the New York Yankees in exchange for Michael King, Drew Thorpe, Randy Vásquez, Jhony Brito, and Kyle Higashioka.

On February 16, 2026, the Padres signed Preller to a multi-year contract extension.

Preceded by Josh Byrnes	San Diego Padres General Manager; 2014-present	Succeeded by current
