= Greg Weissert =

American baseball player (born 1995)

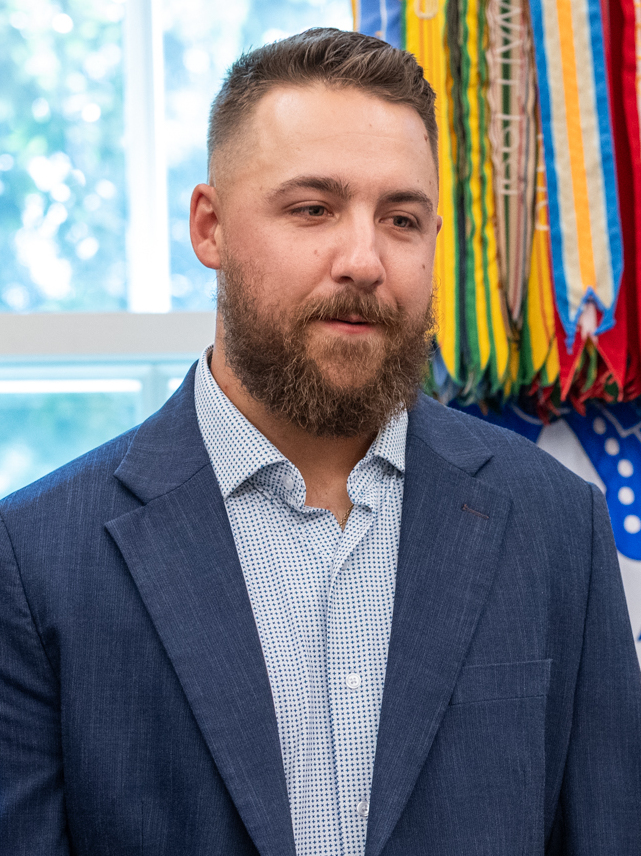
- Weissert in 2025

Boston Red Sox – No. 57
- Pitcher
- Born: February 4, 1995 (age 31); Bay Shore, New York, U.S.
- Bats: Right Throws: Right

MLB debut
- August 25, 2022, for the New York Yankees

MLB statistics (through 2026 season)
- Win–loss record: 17–10
- Earned run average: 3.28
- Strikeouts: 208
- Stats at Baseball Reference

Teams
- New York Yankees (2022–2023); Boston Red Sox (2024–present)

Gregory R. Weissert (born February 4, 1995) is an American professional baseball pitcher for the Boston Red Sox of Major League Baseball (MLB). He has previously played in MLB for the New York Yankees. The Yankees selected Weissert in the 18th round of the 2016 MLB draft. He made his MLB debut in 2022.

== Early life and amateur career ==
Weissert grew up in Bay Shore, New York, and attended Bay Shore High School. He has Italian ancestry through his paternal grandmother, who emigrated to the United States from Calabria, but he was not raised in a traditionally Italian American household. He was an all-county selection in both baseball and volleyball. Weissert attended Fordham University, where he played college baseball for the Fordham Rams for three seasons. As a junior, he posted a 5–4 win–loss record with a 4.04 earned run average (ERA) and 82 strikeouts over 14 starts. In 2015, he played summer league baseball for the Thunder Bay Border Cats of the Northwoods League.

== Professional career ==
=== New York Yankees ===
The New York Yankees selected Weissert in the 18th round of the 2016 MLB draft. After signing with the team he was assigned to the Pulaski Yankees before earning a promotion to the Single–A Charleston RiverDogs. Weissert spent the 2017 season with the Low–A Staten Island Yankees. He returned to Charleston for the beginning of the 2018 season before earning a promotion to the Tampa Tarpons of the High–A Florida State League after striking out 50 batters with a 2.62 ERA over 34 1/3 innings pitched.

Weissert interviewed after his first Major League win

Weissert started the 2019 season with the Tarpons and was promoted to the Double-A Trenton Thunder, where he posted a 1.88 ERA over 14 relief appearances and was eventually promoted to the Triple-A Scranton/Wilkes-Barre RailRiders for the team's postseason. Baseball America rated Weissert as having the best slider in the Yankees' minor league system going into the 2021 season. After starting the year with the Yankees' new Double-A affiliate, the Somerset Patriots, Weissert was promoted to Scranton/Wilkes-Barre after posting a 0.71 ERA in 12 2/3 innings pitched over 12 appearances. In 2022, Weissert served as Scranton/Wilkes-Barre's closer.

On August 25, 2022, the Yankees promoted Weissert to the major leagues. In his major-league debut that night, he hit a batter with his first pitch, committed a balk, hit another batter with his second pitch, and allowed two walks before being removed from the game. On August 30, he collected his first career win after tossing two scoreless innings in a 7–4 victory over the Los Angeles Angels.

The Yankees optioned Weissert to Scranton/Wilkes-Barre to begin the 2023 season.

=== Boston Red Sox ===
On December 5, 2023, the Yankees traded Weissert, Richard Fitts, and Nicholas Judice to the Boston Red Sox in exchange for Alex Verdugo.

== International career ==
Weissert was selected to represent the Italy national baseball team for the 2026 World Baseball Classic. He qualified for selection through his paternal grandmother. His former New York Yankees teammate Ron Marinaccio helped facilitate contact with the Italian baseball federation.

== Personal life ==
In January 2021, Weissert married Abigail.
