= Ian Hamilton (baseball) =

American baseball player (born 1995)

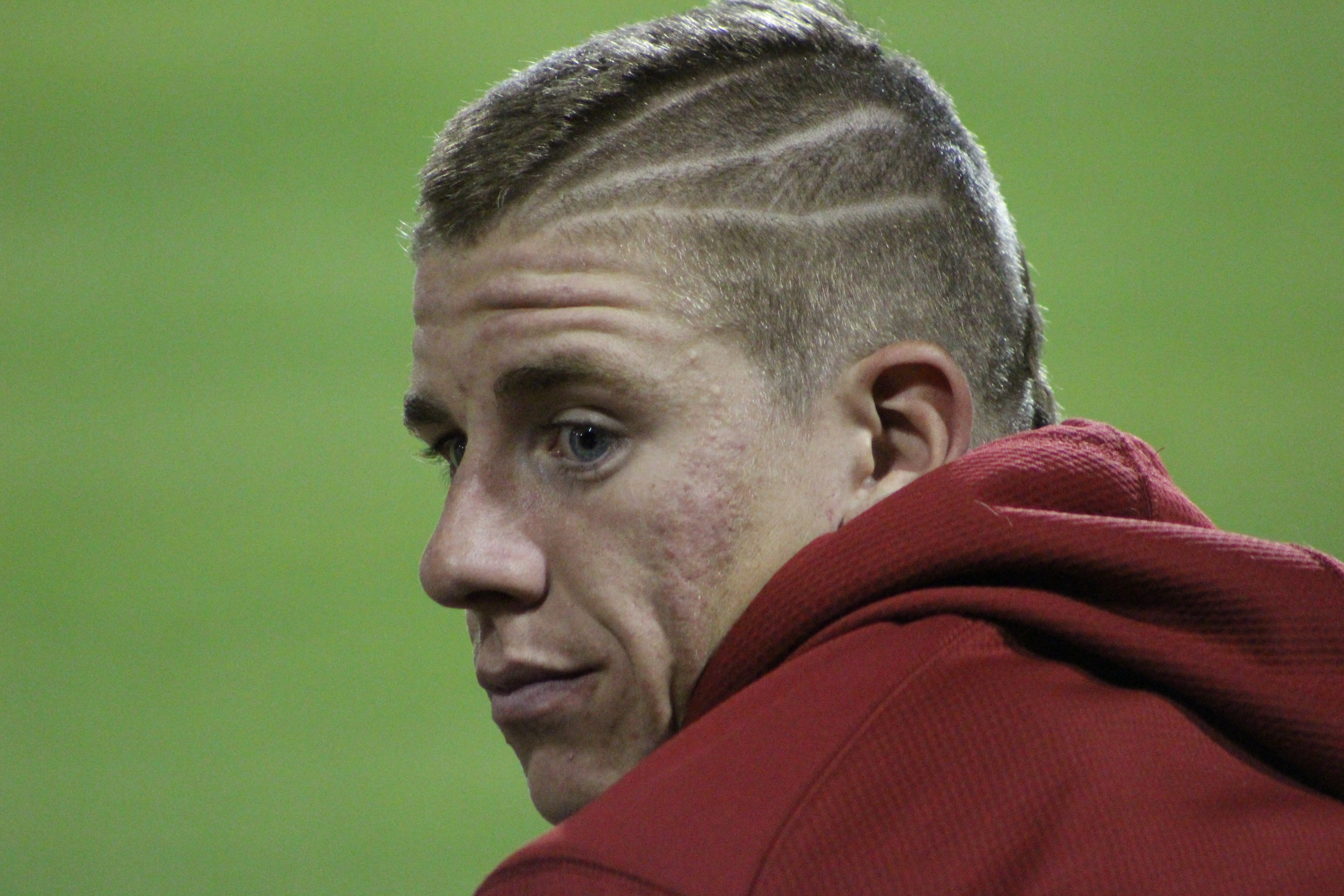
- Hamilton with Washington State in 2015

Free agent
- Pitcher
- Born: June 16, 1995 (age 31); Dover, New Hampshire, U.S.
- Bats: Right Throws: Right

MLB debut
- August 31, 2018, for the Chicago White Sox

MLB statistics (through 2026 season)
- Win–loss record: 6–6
- Earned run average: 3.72
- Strikeouts: 165
- Stats at Baseball Reference

Teams
- Chicago White Sox (2018, 2020); Minnesota Twins (2022); New York Yankees (2023–2025); Atlanta Braves (2026)

Ian Francis Hamilton (born June 16, 1995) is an American professional baseball pitcher who is a free agent. He has previously played in Major League Baseball (MLB) for the Chicago White Sox, Minnesota Twins, New York Yankees, and Atlanta Braves. Hamilton played college baseball for the Washington State Cougars, and was selected by the White Sox in the 11th round of the 2016 MLB draft.

== Career ==
=== Amateur career ===
Hamilton attended Skyview High School in Vancouver, Washington, and Washington State University, where he played college baseball for the Washington State Cougars. He was Washington State's closer his first two years before converting into a starting pitcher as a junior. In 2015, he played collegiate summer baseball with the Wareham Gatemen of the Cape Cod Baseball League, and was West division co-most valuable player of the league's all-star game alongside Devin Smeltzer.

=== Chicago White Sox ===
The Chicago White Sox selected Hamilton in the 11th round of the 2016 Major League Baseball draft and he signed. Hamilton made his professional debut with the Arizona League White Sox and after one game was promoted to the Kannapolis Intimidators, where he spent the remainder of the season, going 1–1 with a 3.69 ERA in 31 2/3 relief innings pitched. He pitched in 2017 for the Winston-Salem Dash and Birmingham Barons, pitching to a combined 4–6 record and 2.64 ERA in 44 relief appearances, and started 2018 with Birmingham before being promoted to the Charlotte Knights.

Hamilton was promoted to the major leagues on August 31, 2018. Hamilton opened the 2019 season on the injured list with right shoulder inflammation, which stemmed from a minor car accident. When he returned, he was optioned to Charlotte. On June 4, while sitting in Charlotte's dugout, Hamilton was struck in the face with a batted ball. Three teeth were knocked out of his mouth and he suffered multiple facial fractures, which required multiple surgeries to repair. On June 28, the White Sox announced that Hamilton would miss the rest of the 2019 season.

On September 18, 2020, Hamilton was designated for assignment by the White Sox. Hamilton was claimed off waivers by the Seattle Mariners on September 25, and was claimed off waivers by the Philadelphia Phillies on December 7. On January 29, 2021, Hamilton was designated for assignment by the Phillies.

=== Minnesota Twins ===
On February 5, 2021, the Minnesota Twins claimed Hamilton off waivers. On February 12, Hamilton was designated for assignment following the signing of Alex Colomé. He had his contract selected on June 3. He was returned to the Triple-A St. Paul Saints on June 6.

=== Cleveland Guardians ===
On August 2, 2022, the Twins traded Hamilton to the Cleveland Guardians in exchange for Sandy León. He spent the remainder of the season with the Triple-A Columbus Clippers, but struggled to an 0–4 record and 6.27 ERA with 24 strikeouts in 18 2/3 innings pitched across 15 appearances for the team. Hamilton elected free agency following the season on November 10.

=== New York Yankees ===
On February 3, 2023, Hamilton signed a minor league contract with the New York Yankees organization. After not making the team in spring training, he was reassigned to the Triple-A Scranton/Wilkes-Barre RailRiders, and agreed to push the opt-out date in his contract to April 5. The Yankees selected Hamilton’s contract on April 3. He earned his first major league save on May 6. Hamilton began the season with a 1.23 ERA in 20 innings pitched, with 30 strikeouts to nine walks, before he went on the injured list due to a strained right groin muscle on May 17. He was transferred to the 60–day injured list on August 26, and activated on September 7.

Hamilton made 35 appearances out of the bullpen for New York during the 2024 campaign, in which he compiled an 0-1 record and 3.82 ERA with 41 strikeouts and one save across 37 2/3 innings pitched.

Hamilton made 36 appearances for New York during the 2025 campaign, accumulating a 2-1 record and 4.28 ERA with 42 strikeouts over 40 innings of work. On November 21, 2025, he was non-tendered by the Yankees and became a free agent.

=== Atlanta Braves ===
On December 19, 2025, Hamilton signed a one-year, non-guaranteed contract with the Atlanta Braves. On March 19, 2026, Hamilton was removed from the 40-man roster and sent outright to the Triple-A Gwinnett Stripers. On April 16, the Braves added him to their active roster. On April 21, Hamilton made his debut with the Braves, pitching one inning in relief and allowing three earned runs. The following day, he was designated for assignment by Atlanta. Hamilton cleared waivers and was sent outright to Gwinnett on April 24. On June 24, the Braves added Hamilton back to their active roster. In three appearances, he posted a 2.45 ERA and recorded three strikeouts. On July 3, Hamilton was designated for assignment by Atlanta. He cleared waivers and was sent outright to Gwinnett on July 5. He elected free agency on October 8.
