= Drew Thorpe =

American baseball player (born 2000)

Chicago White Sox – No. 33
- Pitcher
- Born: October 1, 2000 (age 26); Washington, Utah, U.S.
- Bats: Left Throws: Right

MLB debut
- June 11, 2024, for the Chicago White Sox

MLB statistics (through 2024 season)
- Win–loss record: 3–3
- Earned run average: 5.48
- Strikeouts: 25
- Stats at Baseball Reference

Teams
- Chicago White Sox (2024)

Andrew Robert Thorpe (born October 1, 2000) is an American professional baseball pitcher for the Chicago White Sox of Major League Baseball (MLB). He made his MLB debut in 2024.

== Amateur career ==
Thorpe grew up in Washington, Utah, and attended Desert Hills High School in St. George, Utah. He played summer collegiate baseball after graduating Desert Hills High School for the Peninsula Oilers of the Alaska Baseball League.

Thorpe attended Cal Poly San Luis Obispo, where he played for the Cal Poly Mustangs. Thorpe made four starts and went 1–1 with a 3.21 ERA during his freshman season before it was cut short due to the coronavirus pandemic. As a sophomore, he posted a 6–6 record with 3.79 ERA and 104 strikeouts in 90 1/3 innings pitched. After the 2021 season, Thorpe played for the Yarmouth-Dennis Red Sox of the Cape Cod Baseball League. He was named the Big West Conference Pitcher of the Year as a junior after posting a 10–1 record with a 2.32 ERA and 149 strikeouts in 104 2/3 innings pitched.

== Professional career ==
=== New York Yankees ===
The New York Yankees selected Thorpe in the second round, with the 61st overall selection, in the 2022 Major League Baseball draft. He signed with the team on July 25, 2022, and received a $1.187 million signing bonus. He made his professional debut in 2023, splitting time between the High–A Hudson Valley Renegades and Double–A Somerset Patriots. In 23 combined starts, he accumulated a 14–2 record and 2.52 ERA with 182 strikeouts across 139 1/3 innings of work.

=== Chicago White Sox ===
On December 6, 2023, the Yankees traded Thorpe, Michael King, Randy Vásquez, Jhony Brito, and Kyle Higashioka to the San Diego Padres in exchange for Juan Soto and Trent Grisham. Then on March 13, 2024, the Padres traded Thorpe, Steven Wilson, Jairo Iriarte, and Samuel Zavala to the Chicago White Sox in exchange for Dylan Cease.

He began the 2024 season with the Double–A Birmingham Barons, compiling a 7–1 record and 1.35 ERA with 56 strikeouts across 11 starts. On June 11, 2024, Thorpe was selected to the 40-man roster and promoted to the major leagues for the first time. Thorpe made his Major League debut the same night against the Seattle Mariners, striking out four batters and allowing one run over five innings of work in a 4–3 loss. In nine starts for the White Sox, he logged a 3–3 record and 5.48 ERA with 25 strikeouts over 44 1/3 innings pitched. On September 1, it was announced that Thorpe would be undergoing season–ending surgery to remove a bone spur from his right elbow.

On March 22, 2025, it was announced that Thorpe would undergo Tommy John surgery, ruling him out for the entirety of the season.

On September 16, 2026, Thorpe was activated from the injured list, and was subsequently optioned to the Triple–A Charlotte Knights.
