= Luis Urías =

Mexican baseball player (born 1997)

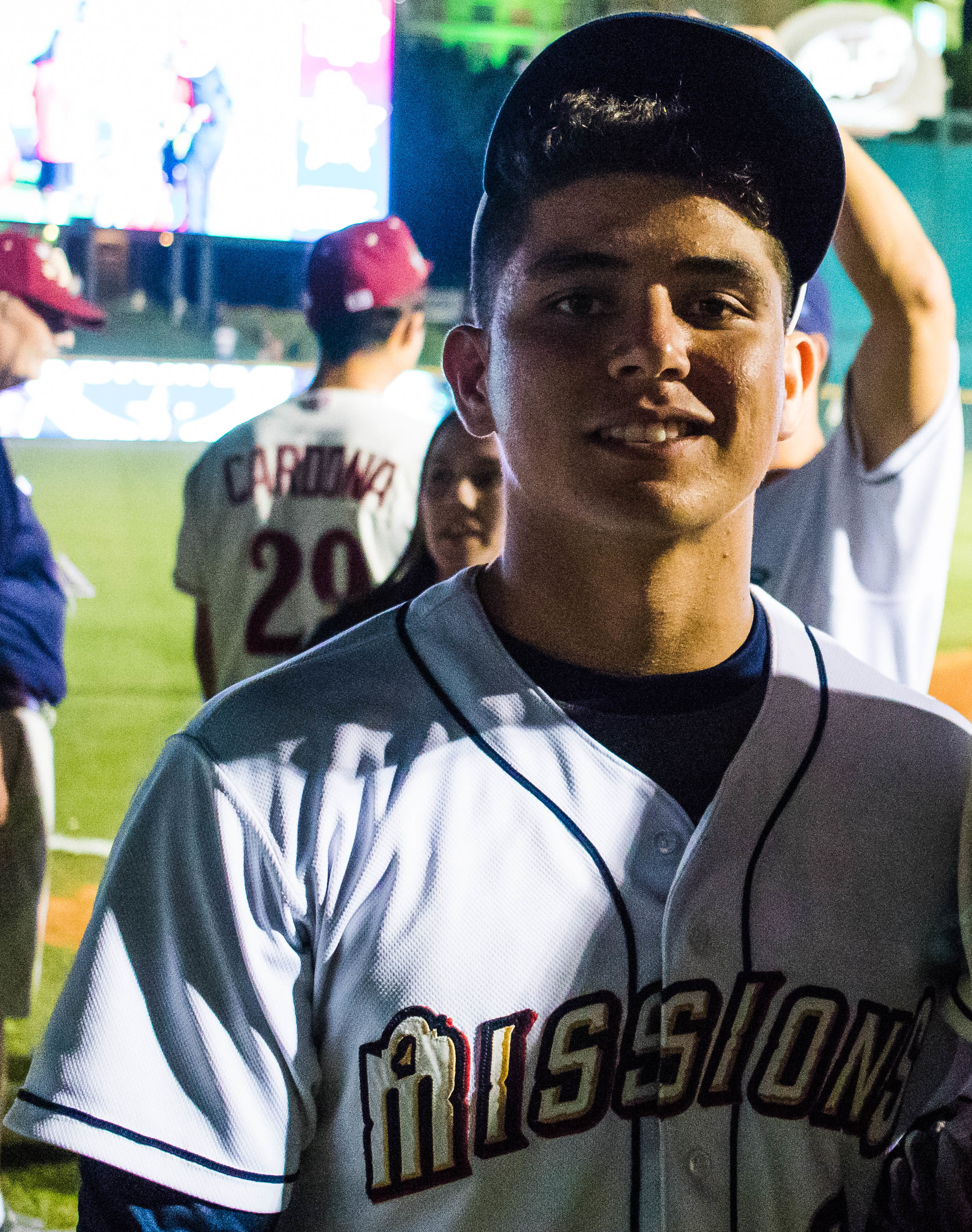
- Urías at the 2017 Texas League All-Star Game

Free agent
- Infielder
- Born: June 3, 1997 (age 29); Magdalena de Kino, Mexico
- Bats: Right Throws: Right

MLB debut
- August 28, 2018, for the San Diego Padres

MLB statistics (through 2026 season)
- Batting average: .232
- Home runs: 63
- Runs batted in: 229
- Stats at Baseball Reference

Teams
- San Diego Padres (2018–2019); Milwaukee Brewers (2020–2023); Boston Red Sox (2023); Seattle Mariners (2024); Athletics (2025); Toronto Blue Jays (2026)
Medals
Men's baseball
Representing Mexico
World Baseball Classic
Bronze medal – third place	2023 Miami	Team

Luis Fernando Urías Figueroa (born June 3, 1997) is a Mexican professional baseball infielder who is a free agent. He has played in Major League Baseball (MLB) for the San Diego Padres, Milwaukee Brewers, Boston Red Sox, Seattle Mariners, Athletics, and Toronto Blue Jays. He made his MLB debut in 2018.

== Professional career ==
=== San Diego Padres ===
Urías signed with the San Diego Padres as an international free agent in December 2013. He made his professional debut in 2014 with the Rookie League Dominican Summer League Padres, and was promoted to the Rookie League Arizona League Padres after two games; in 45 total games between the two clubs in which he split his time between second base and third base, he batted .297 with 14 runs batted in (RBI). In the winter of 2014–15 he played for the Yaquis de Obregón of the Mexican Pacific Winter League, batting .158 in 12 games. In 2015, he played for the Low–A Tri-City Dust Devils and the Single–A Fort Wayne TinCaps, posting a combined .299 batting average with no home runs and 17 RBIs in 61 total games between the two teams. In the winter of 2015–16, he played again for the Yaquis de Obregón of the Mexican Pacific Winter League, batting .280 with no home runs and 11 RBI in 36 games. Urías played primarily in 2016 for the High–A Lake Elsinore Storm, for whom in 120 games he batted .330 with five home runs (his first in the minor leagues), 52 RBI, a .397 OBP, and an .836 OPS. In July he played in three games for the El Paso Chihuahuas of the Triple–A Pacific Coast League, batting 9-for-15 with one home run, as a brief replacement for players who were selected to the All-Star Futures Game. He won the California League Most Valuable Player Award.

Urías was chosen to play for the Mexico national baseball team in the 2017 World Baseball Classic. In 2017, he played for the San Antonio Missions of the Double–A Texas League, where as he split his time between second base and shortstop he posted a .296 batting average with three home runs, 38 RBI, a .380 slugging percentage, and a .778 OPS. Urías entered 2018 ranked the #32 prospect in the minor leagues by Baseball America, #36 by major league baseball, and #74 by Baseball Prospectus. He began the season with the El Paso Chihuahuas. After producing at a .296/.398/.447 clip over 120 games with the team, he was called up to the major leagues on August 28.

In 2018 with the San Diego Padres, Urías batted .208/.264/.354 with two home runs in 48 at-bats. On September 11 he suffered a left hamstring injury, ending his season.

=== Milwaukee Brewers ===
On November 27, 2019, the Padres traded Urías and Eric Lauer to the Milwaukee Brewers in exchange for Trent Grisham, Zach Davies, and cash considerations or a player to be named later. On July 6, 2020, it was announced that Urías had tested positive for COVID-19. As a result, Urías did not play until August 10. During the season, Urías hit .239/.308/.294 in 41 games.

On May 31, 2021, Urías recorded his first career walk-off hit off of Detroit Tigers reliever José Cisnero. Urías finished the 2021 season batting .249/.345/.445 with 23 home runs and 75 RBIs in 150 games. In 2022, he played in 119 games for the Brewers, hitting .239/.335/.404 with 16 home runs and 47 RBI.

On January 13, 2023, Urías agreed to a one-year, $4.7 million contract with the Brewers, avoiding salary arbitration. On April 1, it was announced that Urías had suffered a left hamstring injury on Opening Day and would miss 6–8 weeks. He was activated on June 5, ahead of the team's series finale against the Cincinnati Reds. After struggling to a .145/.299/.236 batting line across 20 games, Urías was optioned to the Triple–A Nashville Sounds on June 29, with Brice Turang being recalled to take his spot.

=== Boston Red Sox ===
On August 1, 2023, Urías was traded to the Boston Red Sox for minor-league pitcher Bradley Blalock. Urías was added to Boston's active roster on August 4. On August 17, Urías hit the first grand slam of his major-league career, during a Red Sox loss to the Washington Nationals. After not playing the next day, he hit another grand slam on August 19, during a win over the New York Yankees. Urías was placed on the injured list on September 22 due to a left calf strain.

=== Seattle Mariners ===
On November 17, 2023, Urías was traded to the Seattle Mariners in exchange for pitcher Isaiah Campbell. In 34 games for Seattle, he batted .152/.264/.316 with three home runs and 12 RBI. On June 4, Urías was removed from the 40–man roster and sent outright to the Triple–A Tacoma Rainiers. On August 31, the Mariners selected Urías' contract, adding him to their active roster. On November 1, Urías was removed from the 40–man roster and sent outright to Tacoma, but he rejected the assignment in favor of free agency.

=== Athletics ===
On February 17, 2025, Urías signed a one-year, $1.1 million contract with the Athletics. In 96 appearances for the team, he batted .230/.315/.338 with eight home runs, 25 RBI, and two stolen bases. Urías was designated for assignment by the Athletics on August 25. He was released by the team on August 28.

=== Milwaukee Brewers (second stint) ===
On August 31, 2025, Urías signed a minor league contract with the Milwaukee Brewers organization. He made 13 appearances for the Triple-A Nashville Sounds, batting .260/.351/.380 with one home run, 11 RBI, and one stolen base. Urías elected free agency following the season on November 6.

=== Arizona Diamondbacks ===
On March 16, 2026, Urías signed a minor league contract with the Arizona Diamondbacks organization. In 32 appearances split between the rookie-level Arizona Complex League Diamondbacks and Triple-A Reno Aces, Urías batted a cumulative .347/.385/.508 with three home runs, 21 RBI, and one stolen base.

=== Toronto Blue Jays ===
On June 20, 2026, Urías was traded to the Toronto Blue Jays in exchange for cash considerations. On June 22, the Blue Jays selected Urías' contract, adding him to their active roster. The next day, in his first game as a Blue Jay, his hits included a two-run home run against the Houston Astros. Urías connected on an 84.7 mph slider, driving it 363 feet over the wall with an exit velocity of 99.3 mph.

== Personal life ==
Urías is the youngest child of María Trinidad Figueroa Esquer and Ramón Urías. His older brother is Ramón Urías, who is an MLB infielder.
