= Clarke Schmidt =

American baseball player (born 1996)

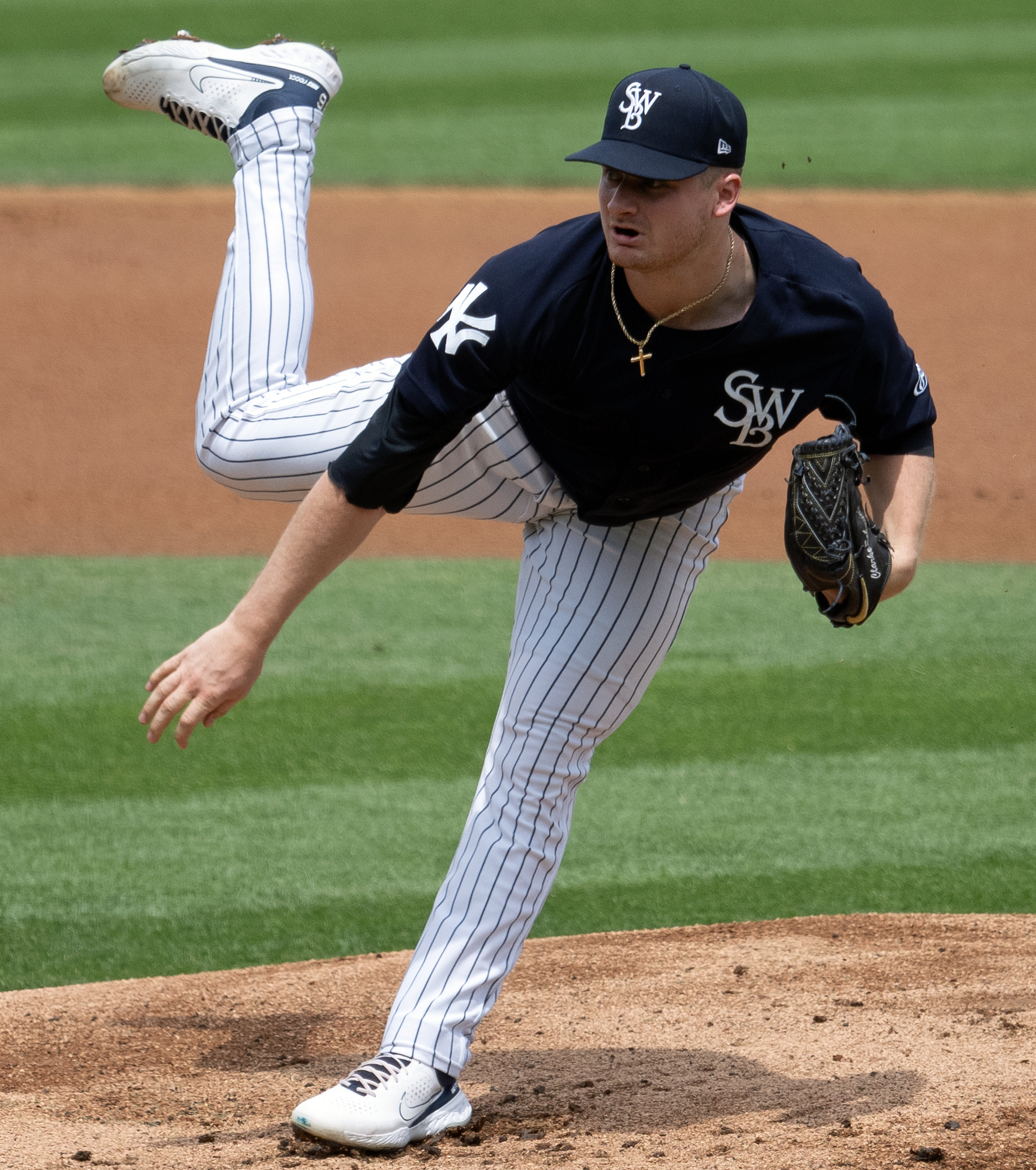
- Schmidt with the Scranton/Wilkes-Barre RailRiders in 2022

New York Yankees – No. 36
- Pitcher
- Born: February 20, 1996 (age 30); Acworth, Georgia, U.S.
- Bats: Right Throws: Right

MLB debut
- September 4, 2020, for the New York Yankees

MLB statistics (through 2026 season)
- Win–loss record: 23–24
- Earned run average: 3.81
- Strikeouts: 386
- Stats at Baseball Reference

Teams
- New York Yankees (2020–present)

Clarke Douglas Schmidt (born February 20, 1996) is an American professional baseball pitcher for the New York Yankees of Major League Baseball (MLB). Schmidt played college baseball for the South Carolina Gamecocks, and was selected by the Yankees in the first round, 16th overall, of the 2017 MLB draft. He made his MLB debut in 2020.

== Amateur career ==
Schmidt attended Allatoona High School in Acworth, Georgia. He was not drafted out of high school and played college baseball at the University of South Carolina for the Gamecocks.

As a freshman, Schmidt pitched in 18 games and made 10 starts, pitching to a 2–2 win–loss record with a 4.81 earned run average (ERA) and 55 strikeouts. He became South Carolina's ace as a sophomore in 2016. He pitched in 18 games with 17 starts and went 9–5 with a 3.40 ERA and 129 strikeouts. Schmidt remained the team's number one starter his junior year in 2017. He underwent Tommy John surgery in April 2017.

== Professional career ==
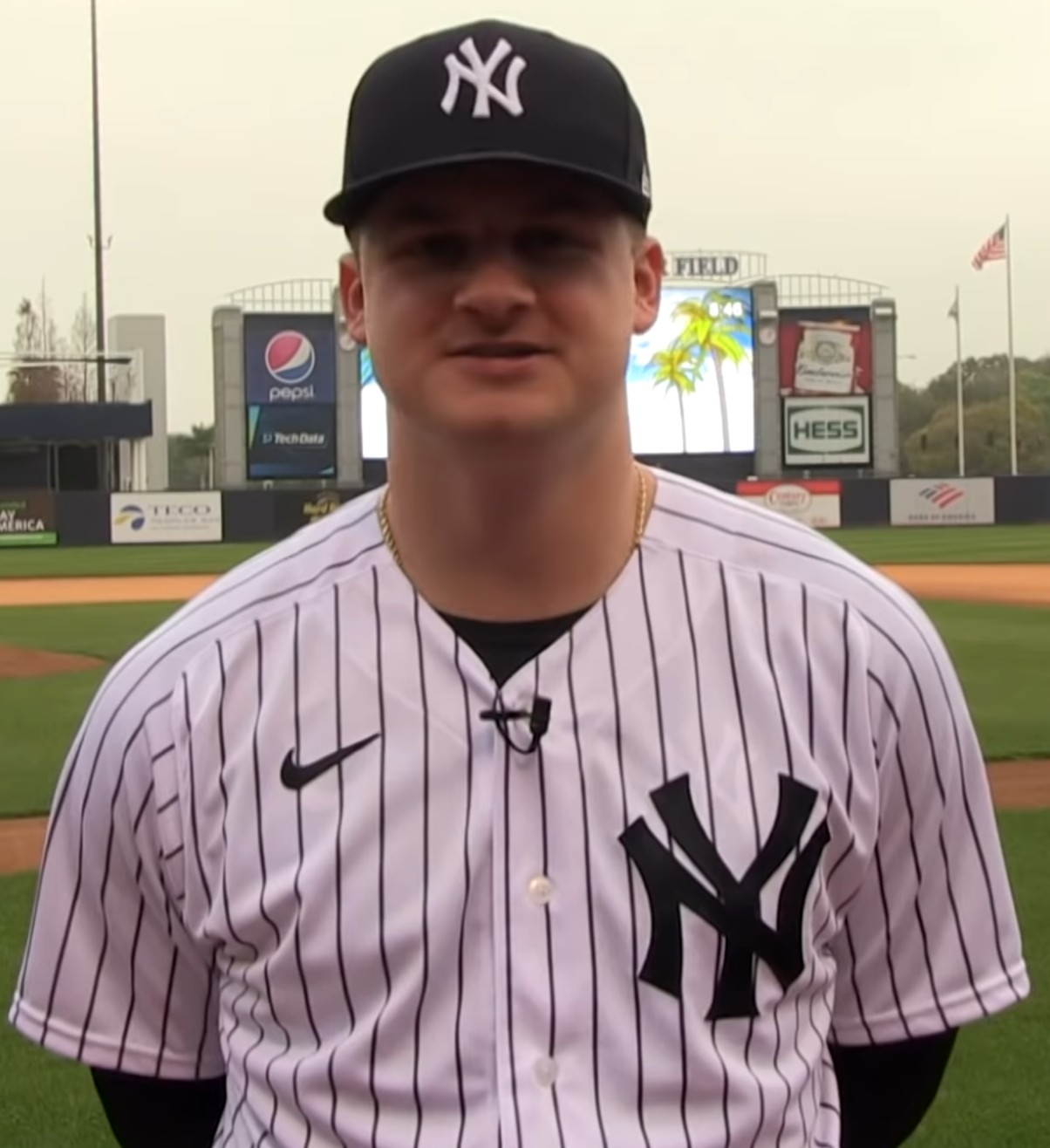
Schmidt with the Yankees during 2020 spring training

The New York Yankees selected Schmidt in the first round, with the 16th overall selection, of the 2017 MLB draft. On June 24, 2017, the Yankees signed Schmidt for a $2,184,300 signing bonus. He did not see any action in 2017 after signing due to the surgery. He made his professional debut in 2018 and spent time with the GCL Yankees of the Rookie-level Gulf Coast League and Staten Island Yankees of the Low-A New York-Penn League, going 0–3 with a 3.09 ERA in 23 1/3 innings pitched between the two teams.

Schmidt began 2019 with the Tampa Tarpons of the High-A Florida State League. In August, the Yankees promoted him to the Trenton Thunder of the Double-A Eastern League.

The Yankees promoted Schmidt to the major leagues on September 4, 2020. He made his major league debut that day as a relief pitcher.

In the beginning of spring training for the 2021 season, Schmidt was shut down due to a common extensor strain in his right elbow and no ligament damage was shown in an MRI. On March 27, 2021, Schmidt was placed on the 60-day injured list. On August 12, Schmidt was activated off of the injured list and optioned to the Triple-A Scranton/Wilkes-Barre RailRiders.

Schmidt made the Yankees Opening Day roster for the 2022 season. He earned his first major league win on April 19. On July 24, Schmidt recorded his first career save after tossing three scoreless innings against the Baltimore Orioles. He made 14 starts for New York, compiling a 4-4 record and 3.32 ERA with 73 strikeouts across 78 2/3 innings pitched.

On July 10, 2025, the Yankees announced that Schmidt would undergo Tommy John surgery for the second time of his career, ending his season.

Schmidt began the 2026 season on the 60-day injured list, still recovering from Tommy John surgery he had the previous year. On September 16, 2026, Schmidt was activated from the injured list for his season debut.

== Personal life ==
His brother, Clate Schmidt, played college baseball at Clemson from 2013 to 2016. Clate was diagnosed with Hodgkin's lymphoma in 2015, but recovered, and became a professional player, last playing for the Single-A Dayton Dragons of the Cincinnati Reds organization in 2019.

His father, Dwight Schmidt, is a pilot and a 30 year veteran of the US Marine Corps. Dwight has piloted the Yankees team plane on several occasions during Clarke's tenure with the team and, on May 22, 2025, Dwight threw the ceremonial first pitch to his son before a home game against the Texas Rangers.

== See also ==
- List of World Series starting pitchers
- New York Yankees award winners and league leaders
