= Trent Grisham =

American baseball player (born 1996)

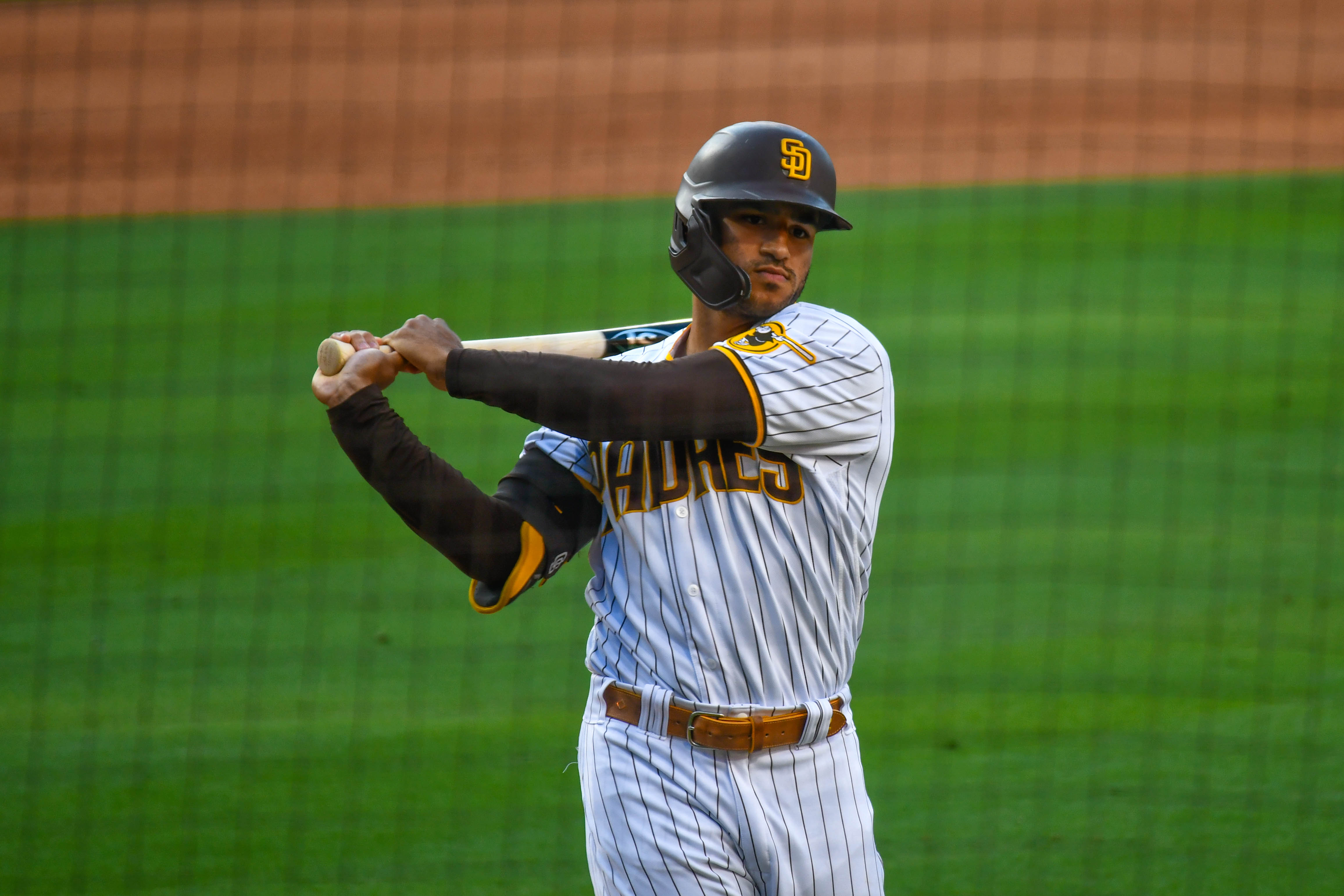
- Grisham with the San Diego Padres in 2021

Free agent
- Center fielder
- Born: November 1, 1996 (age 29); Burleson, Texas, U.S.
- Bats: Left Throws: Left

MLB debut
- August 1, 2019, for the Milwaukee Brewers

MLB statistics (through 2026 season)
- Batting average: .217
- Home runs: 122
- Runs batted in: 379
- Stats at Baseball Reference

Teams
- Milwaukee Brewers (2019); San Diego Padres (2020–2023); New York Yankees (2024–2026)

Career highlights and awards
- 2× Gold Glove Award (2020, 2022)

Trenton Marcus Grisham (né Clark; born November 1, 1996) is an American professional baseball center fielder who is a free agent. He has played in Major League Baseball (MLB) for the Milwaukee Brewers, San Diego Padres, and New York Yankees.

Grisham was born and raised in the Fort Worth, Texas area, where he attended Richland High School and emerged as a top MLB draft prospect. The Brewers selected Grisham in the first round of the 2015 MLB draft with the 15th pick. After spending all or parts of five seasons in the Brewers farm system, he made his MLB debut in 2019. Following the 2019 season, Grisham was sent to the Padres as part of a multi-player trade and became the team's primary center fielder. In 2020, he won the first Gold Glove Award of his career. In 2022, Grisham posted the lowest batting average in the league among qualified batters at .184 but won his second career Gold Glove. He was traded to the Yankees following the 2023 season.

== Career ==
=== Amateur career ===
Grisham attended Richland High School in North Richland Hills, Texas. He played baseball and was on the football team as a freshman. He batted .441 with ten home runs as a junior, and .552 with three home runs as a senior. Playing with the 18-under Team USA team during the summer after his junior year, Grisham hit .538 with a .923 slugging percentage, 24 runs batted in (RBIs), and ten stolen bases over 12 games. He committed to Texas Tech University to play college baseball.

=== Milwaukee Brewers ===
Grisham was considered one of the top prospects for the 2015 Major League Baseball draft. The Milwaukee Brewers selected him in the first round, with the 15th overall pick, of the draft. He signed with them, was assigned to the Arizona League Brewers, and was later promoted to the Helena Brewers; in 55 total games between both teams, he posted a .309 batting average with two home runs, 21 RBIs and a .854 OPS. Grisham spent 2016 with the Wisconsin Timber Rattlers where he batted .231 with two home runs and 24 RBIs in only 59 games due to hamstring injuries.

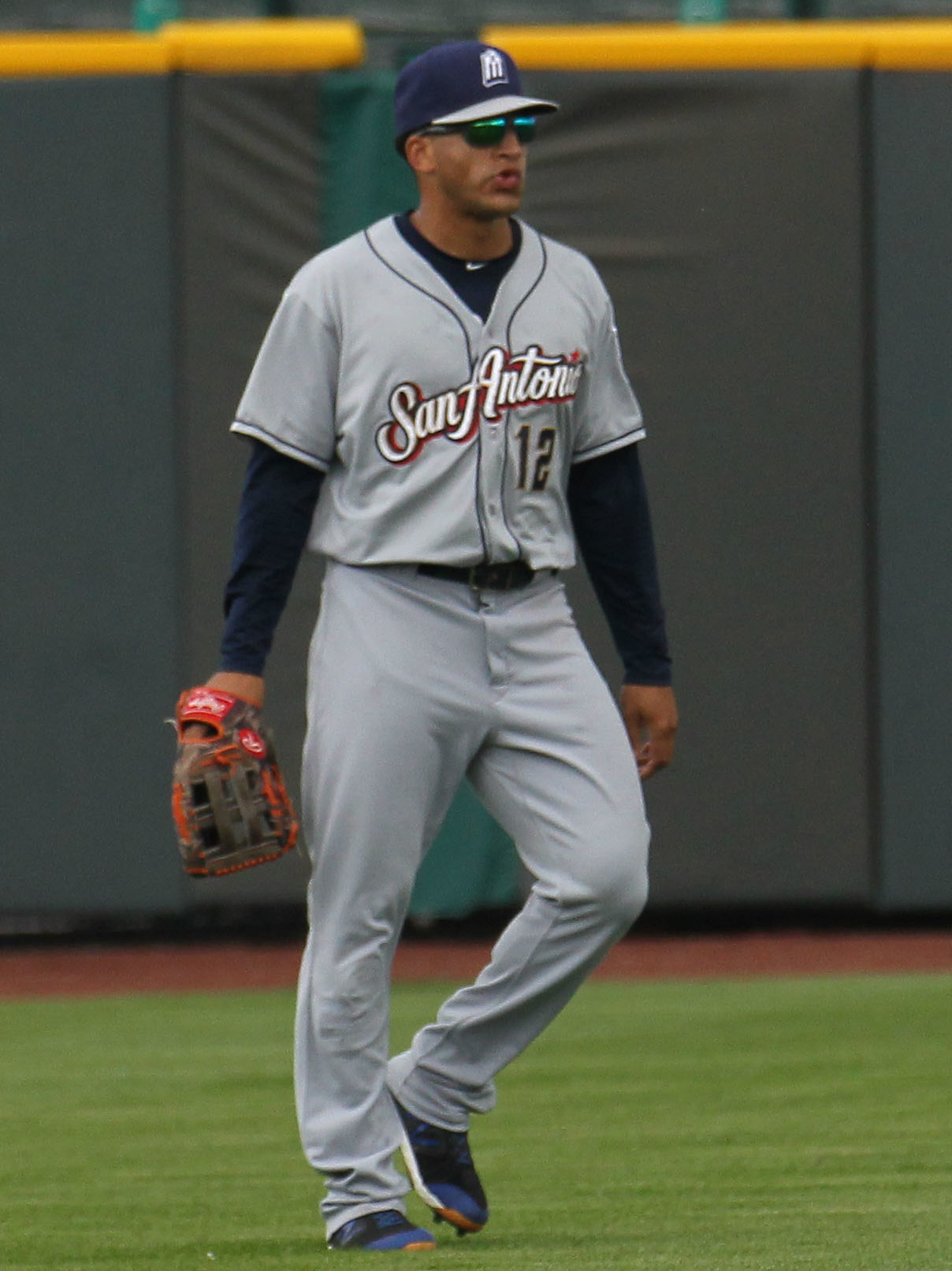
Grisham with the San Antonio Missions in 2019

In 2017, Grisham played for the Carolina Mudcats, posting a .223 batting average with eight home runs, 45 RBIs and 37 stolen bases in 133 games. In 2018, he played with the Biloxi Shuckers, hitting .233 with seven home runs, 31 RBIs, and 11 stolen bases in 107 games. Grisham opened the 2019 season with the San Antonio Missions.

On August 1, 2019, the Brewers selected Grisham's contract and promoted him to the major leagues. He made his major league debut that day versus the Oakland Athletics.

=== San Diego Padres ===
On November 27, 2019, the Brewers traded Grisham, Zach Davies, and cash considerations or a player to be named later to the San Diego Padres in exchange for Luis Urías and Eric Lauer.

On August 22, 2020, Grisham had his first career multi-home run game, hitting homers in the first and second innings against Brandon Bielak of the Houston Astros. In the seventh inning, Grisham hit his third home run of the game against Joe Biagini, his first career three-homer game and first Padres three-homer game since Hunter Renfroe had done so on June 14, 2019.

Grisham finished the shortened 2020 season hitting .251/.352/.456 with 10 home runs and 26 RBIs in 59 games. He also led NL outfielders with 134 putouts and won the National League Gold Glove Award as a center fielder.

Grisham began the 2021 season on the IL with a hamstring strain he suffered early in spring training, but he rejoined the team on April 9. He also missed 20 games in the middle of the season with a left heel bruise. Grisham was the Padres everyday center fielder, starting 118 games there in 2021. For the season, he batted .242/.327/.413 with 15 home runs, 62 RBIs and 13 stolen bases in 132 games. He batted in the leadoff position in 52 of his starts.

In 2022 he had the lowest batting average in the majors, hitting .184/.284/.341 in 451 at bats. He led the major leagues in sacrifice hits, with seven.

On January 13, 2023, Grisham agreed to a one-year, $3.175 million contract with the Padres, avoiding salary arbitration.

=== New York Yankees ===
On December 6, 2023, the Padres traded Grisham and Juan Soto to the New York Yankees for Michael King, Drew Thorpe, Jhony Brito, Randy Vásquez, and Kyle Higashioka. In 2024, Grisham played in 76 games for the Yankees, batting .190/.290/.385 with 9 home runs and 31 RBI.

In 2025, Grisham got off to the best start of his career, improving his offensive profile and earning significant playing time in center field. He had his career high season, hitting .235/.348/464, with an impressive OPS of .812. He hit 34 home runs and had 74 RBI. On November 18, Grisham accepted the Yankees qualifying offer and returned to the team on a one-year $22.025 million contract.

In 2026, Grisham failed to reach his numbers in 2025, but had streaks where he heavily carried the offense. In 2026, Grisham played 121 games due to a grade two right hamstring strain in early September, and slashed .211/.308/395, with 18 home runs and 59 RBI. In the "win or go home" game three of the 2026 ALDS between the Yankees and the Tampa Bay Rays, he batted leadoff but went 0-5 with 3 Ks. He ended the Yankees' season striking out against Bryan Baker with a runner on second base.

== Personal life ==
Grisham was born and grew up in Fort Worth, Texas. His first legal name was Trenton Marcus Clark. He changed his last name in 2017 to Grisham, which is his mother's last name.

Grisham is married to Megan Grisham, and he follows the Christian faith. Their first child was born in April 2025.
