= Kyle Higashioka =

American baseball player (born 1990)

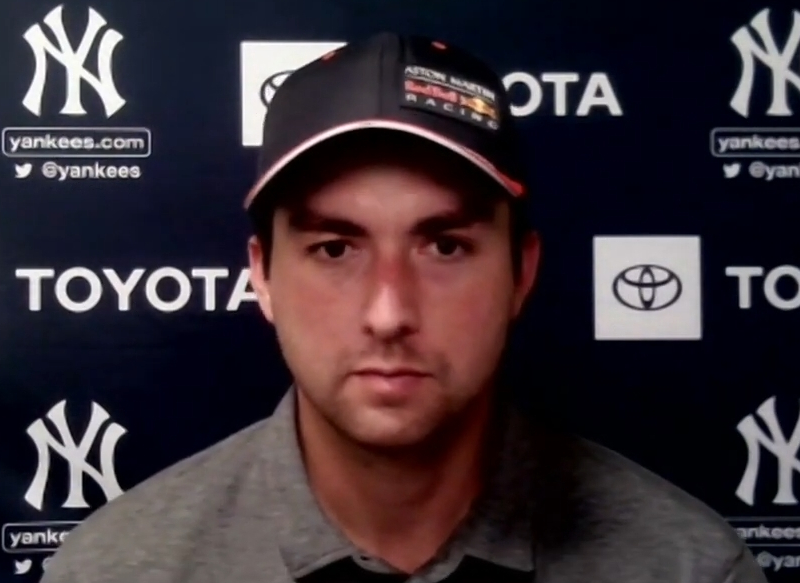
- Higashioka in 2021

Free agent
- Catcher
- Born: April 20, 1990 (age 36); Huntington Beach, California, U.S.
- Bats: Right Throws: Right

MLB debut
- April 10, 2017, for the New York Yankees

Career statistics (through 2026 season)
- Batting average: .218
- Home runs: 75
- Runs batted in: 231
- Stats at Baseball Reference

Teams
- New York Yankees (2017–2023); San Diego Padres (2024); Texas Rangers (2025–2026)
Medals
Men's baseball
Representing United States
World Baseball Classic
Silver medal – second place	2023 Miami	Team

Kyle Harris "Higgy" Higashioka (born April 20, 1990) is an American professional baseball catcher who is a free agent. He has previously played in Major League Baseball (MLB) for the New York Yankees, San Diego Padres, and Texas Rangers. He also played for the United States national baseball team at the 2023 World Baseball Classic.

== Amateur career ==
Higashioka attended Edison High School in Huntington Beach, California. He played for the school's baseball team and committed to the University of California, Berkeley to play college baseball for the California Golden Bears.

== Professional career ==
=== Minor leagues (2008–2017) ===
The New York Yankees selected him in the seventh round of the 2008 MLB draft. He signed with the Yankees, receiving a $500,000 signing bonus, rather than attending college.

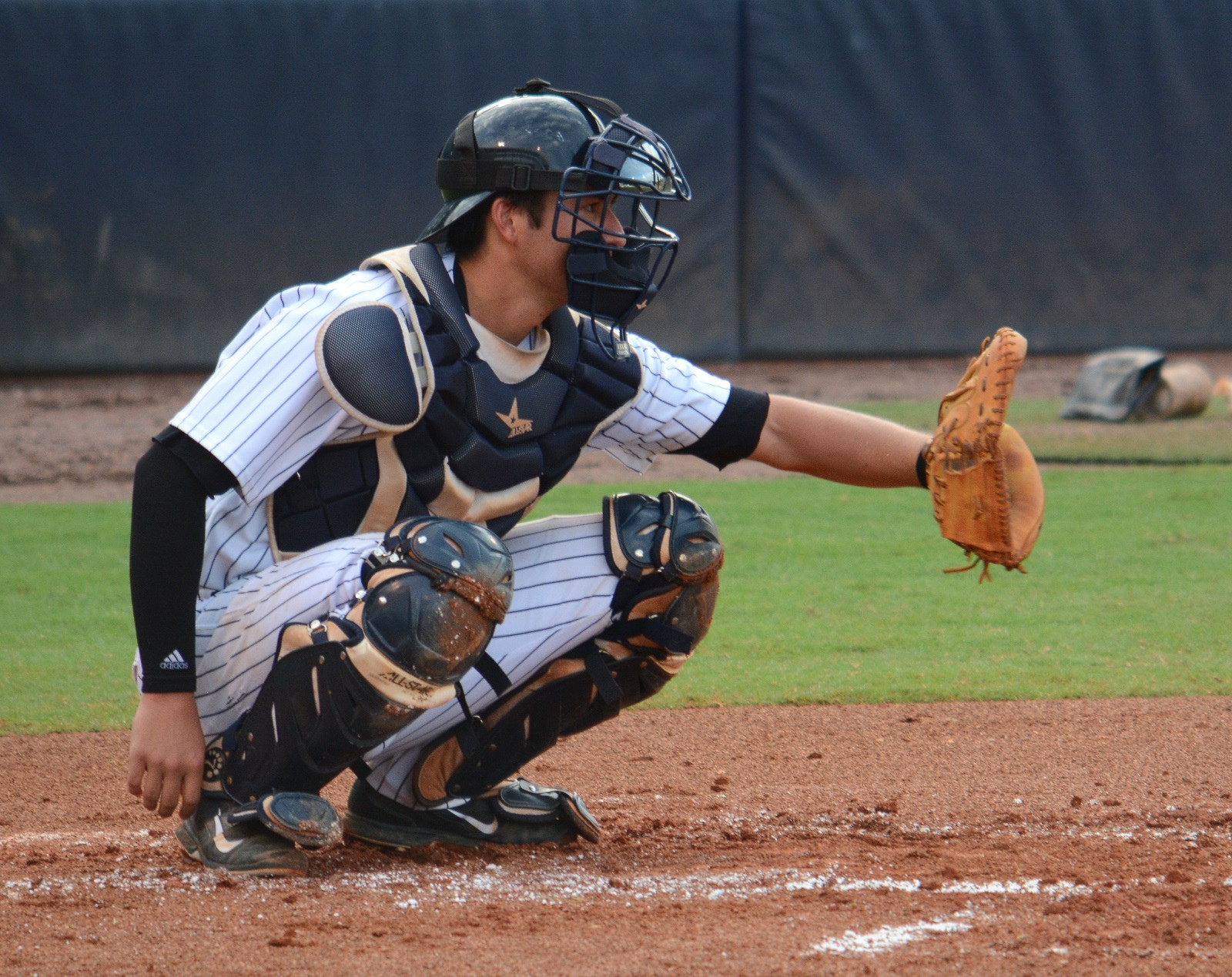
Higashioka catching for the Tampa Yankees in 2015

Higashioka played in 2012 for the Tampa Yankees of the High–A Florida State League and Trenton Thunder, batting .170/.228/.327 in 147 at–bats combined. During the 2013 and 2014 seasons he played in only 13 games combined, due to Tommy John surgery and a broken thumb. He played with the Tampa Yankees in 2015, and became a minor league free agent after the 2015 season. He re–signed with the Yankees during the offseason.

Higashioka started the 2016 season with the Trenton Thunder of the Double–A Eastern League, and won the Player of the Week Award. He was promoted to the Scranton/Wilkes-Barre RailRiders of the Triple–A International League during the season. He finished the 2016 season with a .276 batting average, 21 home runs, and 81 runs batted in, and the Yankees added him to their 40 man roster.

The Yankees optioned Higashioka to Scranton/Wilkes-Barre for the start of the 2017 season.

=== New York Yankees (2017–2023) ===
After playing in one game for the RailRiders in 2017, the Yankees promoted Higashioka to the major leagues, following an injury to Gary Sánchez. Higashioka made his major league debut as a defensive replacement on April 10. He batted 0-for-18 in nine games for the Yankees, and was optioned back to Scranton/Wilkes-Barre on May 5, when Sánchez was activated from the injured list. The Yankees promoted Higashioka back to the major leagues on June 16. After returning to the minors he suffered a knee injury and played in eight minor league games during August and September.

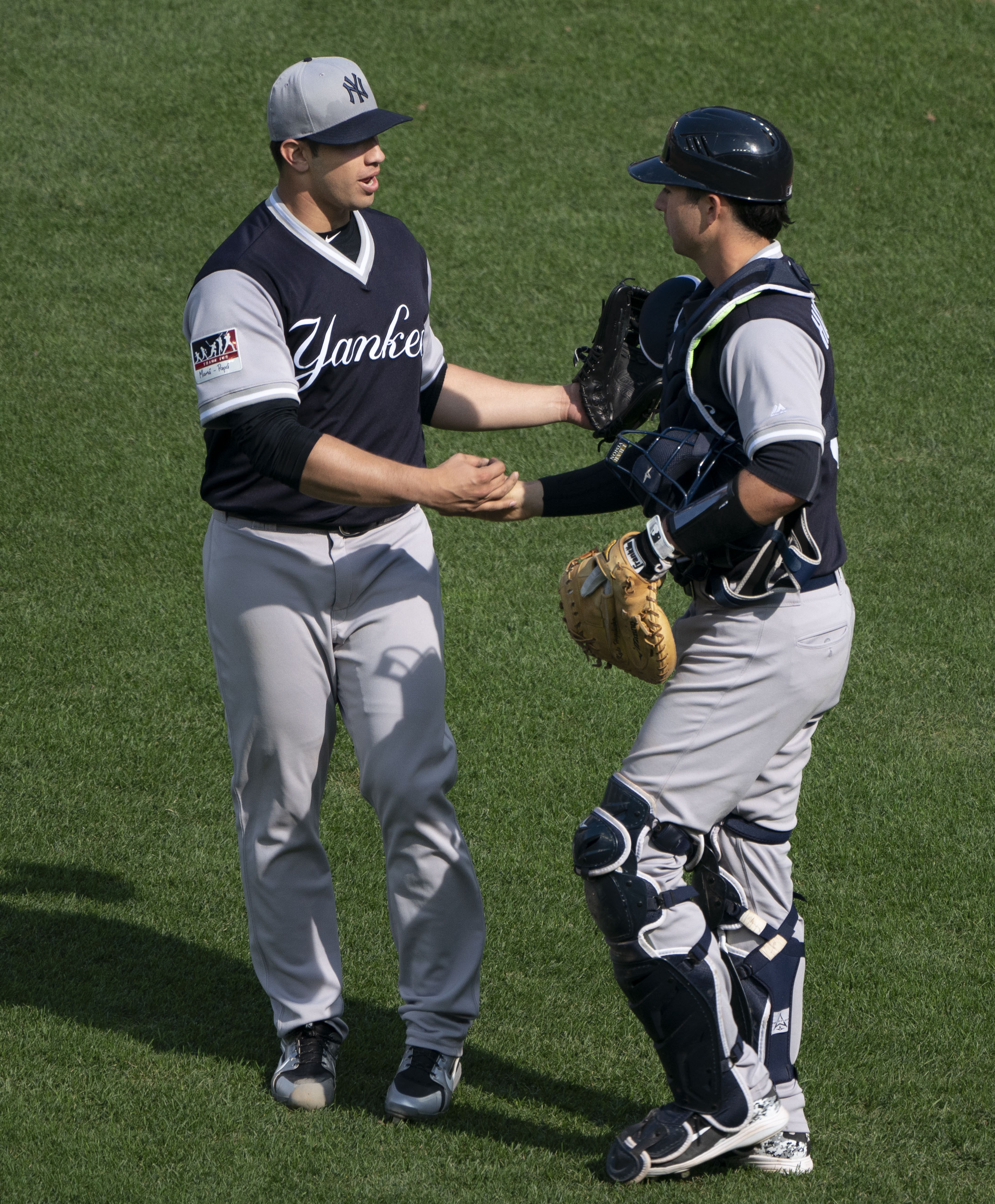
Higashioka (right) with Luis Cessa

Higashioka began the 2018 season with Scranton/Wilkes-Barre. With Scranton/Wilkes-Barre in 2018, he batted .202/.276/.346 in 188 at bats. He was called up to the majors on June 27, following an injury to Sánchez.

After starting his major league career 0-for-22, the longest hitless streak to start a Yankee career of any position player ever, he had his first major league hit, a home run, on July 1 against David Price of the Boston Red Sox. His next two hits, on July 3 and 4 against the Atlanta Braves, were also home runs, making him the ninth MLB player since 1920 whose first three major league hits were home runs. With the Yankees in 2018, he batted .167/.241/.319 in 72 at bats. In 2019, Higashioka batted .214 with three home runs and 11 RBIs in 18 games with the Yankees.

On September 16, 2020, Higashioka hit three home runs in a game against the Toronto Blue Jays. He became the 24th Yankee to have a three home run game and the first to do so while batting ninth in the batting order.

On May 19, 2021, Higashioka caught Corey Kluber's no-hitter against the Texas Rangers. On June 12, 2022, Higashioka hit a home run on a 35.1 miles per hour (56.5 km/h) pitch off of first baseman Frank Schwindel who came in to pitch in the eighth inning. It was the slowest pitch hit for a home run since the debut of Statcast in 2015. He batted .227 in 83 games in the 2022 season.

Higashioka played for the United States national baseball team in the 2023 World Baseball Classic. On June 28, 2023, Higashioka caught Domingo Germán's perfect game. On September 10, 2023, Higashioka had his first career walkoff hit in the 13th inning.

=== San Diego Padres (2024) ===
On December 6, 2023, the Yankees traded Higashioka, Michael King, Drew Thorpe, Randy Vásquez, and Jhony Brito, to the San Diego Padres for Juan Soto and Trent Grisham. On April 3, 2024, Higashioka recorded his first hit with the Padres, a home run, in Petco Park against the St. Louis Cardinals. In 84 games for San Diego, he slashed .220/.263/.476 with career–highs in home runs (17) and RBI (45).

=== Texas Rangers (2025-2026) ===
On December 2, 2024, Higashioka signed a two-year contract with the Texas Rangers that includes a mutual option for the 2027 season. On October 30, 2026, the Rangers declined his option making him a free agent.

== Personal life ==
Kyle Higashioka is married to Alyse Higashioka. His father, Ted, is a third-generation Japanese American. Kyle learned Japanese to connect with his heritage and better communicate with former teammate Masahiro Tanaka. Higashioka's ancestry is one-half Japanese. Higashioka also studied Spanish in high school and uses it to communicate with Latin American teammates. Higashioka promised his mother, Diane, that he would earn a college degree; as of 2017, he was taking classes in mechanical engineering at Orange Coast College.
