= Randy Vásquez (baseball) =

Dominican baseball player (born 1998)

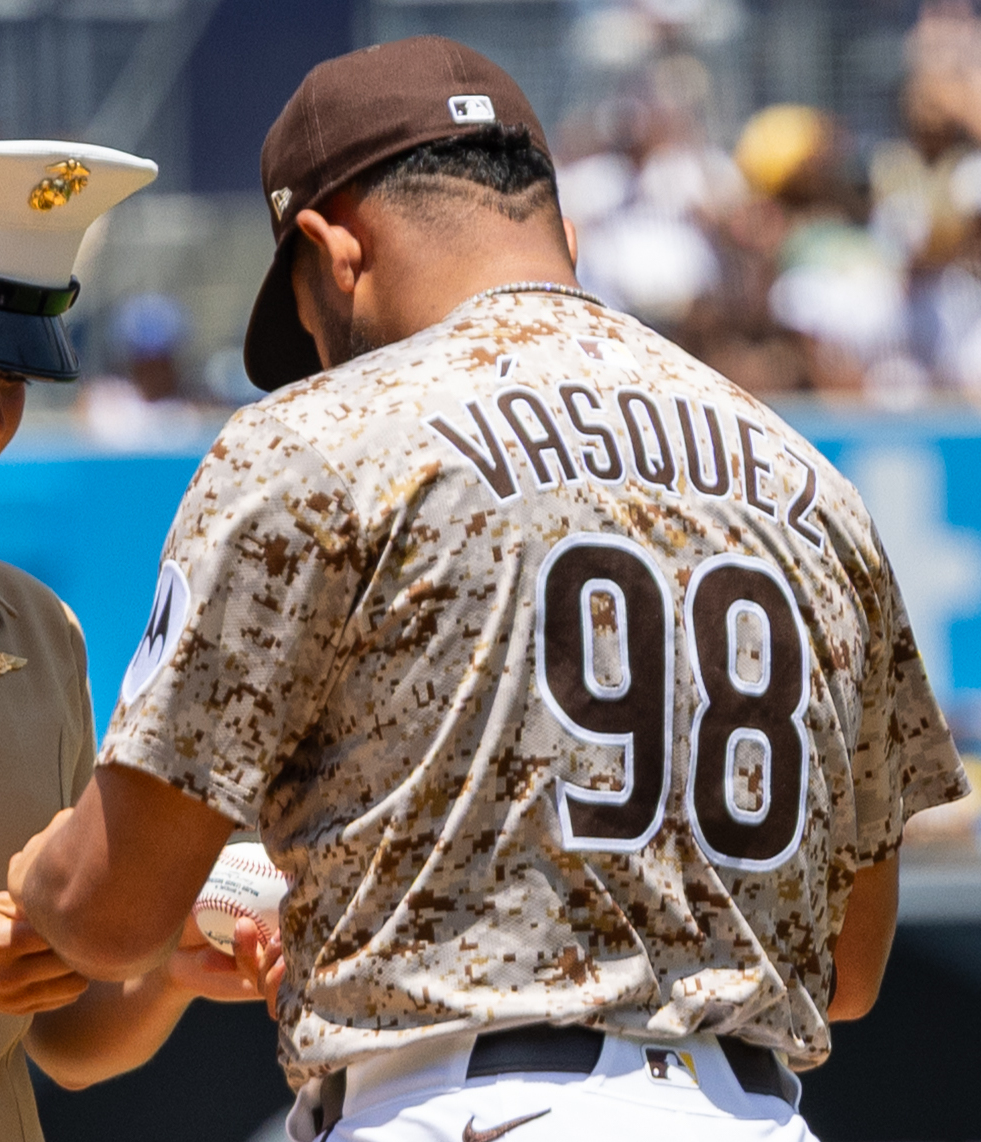
- Vásquez with the San Diego Padres in 2025

San Diego Padres – No. 98
- Pitcher
- Born: November 3, 1998 (age 28); Navarette, Dominican Republic
- Bats: Right Throws: Right

MLB debut
- May 26, 2023, for the New York Yankees

MLB statistics (through 2026 season)
- Win–loss record: 22–22
- Earned run average: 4.02
- Strikeouts: 260
- Stats at Baseball Reference

Teams
- New York Yankees (2023); San Diego Padres (2024–present)

Randy Marcelino Vásquez (born November 3, 1998) is a Dominican professional baseball pitcher for the San Diego Padres of Major League Baseball (MLB). He has previously played in MLB for the New York Yankees.

== Career ==
=== New York Yankees ===
Vásquez signed with the New York Yankees as an international free agent on May 21, 2018. He spent his first professional season with the Dominican Summer League Yankees and Gulf Coast Yankees. He spent 2019 with the rookie-level Pulaski Yankees, making 11 starts and recording a 3.29 ERA with 53 strikeouts in 54.2 innings pitched. Vásquez did not play in a game in 2020 due to the cancellation of the minor league season due to the COVID-19 pandemic.

In 2021, he pitched for the Single-A Tampa Tarpons, High-A Hudson Valley Renegades and Double-A Somerset Patriots. In 23 appearances (21 starts) between the three affiliates, Vásquez pitched to an 8–4 record and 2.52 ERA with 130 strikeouts in 107.1 innings of work. He was assigned to Somerset to begin the 2022 season. In the Eastern League championship game, Vásquez pitched eight innings of a combined no-hitter. In 25 starts for Somerset, he registered a 2–7 record and 3.90 ERA with 120 strikeouts in 115.1 innings of work. On November 15, 2022, the Yankees added Vásquez to their 40-man roster to protect him from the Rule 5 draft.

Vásquez was optioned to the Triple-A Scranton/Wilkes-Barre RailRiders to begin the 2023 season. In 9 starts for Scranton, Vásquez logged a 1–5 record and 4.85 ERA with 50 strikeouts in 42.2 innings pitched. On May 25, 2023, the Yankees announced that Vásquez would be promoted to the major leagues for the first time to start the following day against the San Diego Padres.

=== San Diego Padres ===
On December 6, 2023, the Yankees traded Vásquez, Michael King, Drew Thorpe, Jhony Brito, and Kyle Higashioka to the San Diego Padres for Juan Soto and Trent Grisham.
