= Michael King (baseball) =

American baseball player (born 1995)

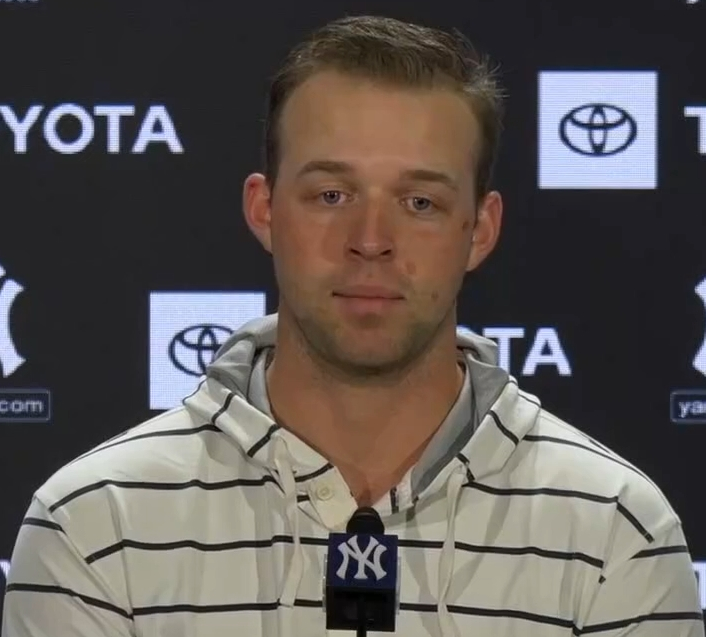
- King in 2021

Free agent
- Pitcher
- Born: May 25, 1995 (age 31); Rochester, New York, U.S.
- Bats: Right Throws: Right

MLB debut
- September 27, 2019, for the New York Yankees

MLB statistics (through 2026 season)
- Win–loss record: 43–39
- Earned run average: 3.23
- Strikeouts: 718
- Stats at Baseball Reference

Teams
- New York Yankees (2019–2023); San Diego Padres (2024–2026)

Michael McRae King (born May 25, 1995) is an American professional baseball pitcher who is a free agent. He has played in Major League Baseball (MLB) for the New York Yankees and San Diego Padres. He made his MLB debut in 2019.

== Amateur career ==
King attended Bishop Hendricken High School in Warwick, Rhode Island. He played for the school's baseball team as a pitcher and an outfielder, and helped the team win the Division I state championship in 2012, his junior year. In 2013, he was named the Gatorade Baseball Player of the Year for Rhode Island after pitching to a 7–0 win–loss record and a 0.30 earned run average (ERA) with 67 strikeouts and seven walks in 47 innings pitched. He also had a .469 batting average as an outfielder.

King graduated from Bishop Hendricken in 2013 and enrolled at Boston College, where he played college baseball for the Boston College Eagles. In 2015, he played collegiate summer baseball with the Hyannis Harbor Hawks of the Cape Cod Baseball League.

== Professional career ==
=== Miami Marlins ===
The Miami Marlins selected King in the 12th round, with the 353rd overall selection, of the 2016 Major League Baseball draft. He signed and made his professional debut that season with the Gulf Coast Marlins of the Rookie-level Gulf Coast League before being promoted to the Batavia Muckdogs of the Low–A New York-Penn League and then to the Greensboro Grasshoppers of the Single–A South Atlantic League. In 30 2/3 innings pitched between the three teams, he finished the season with a 3–3 record and a 4.11 ERA. He spent the 2017 season with Greensboro, where he went 11–9 with a 3.14 ERA in 26 games (25 starts).

=== New York Yankees ===
On November 20, 2017, the Marlins traded King and international signing bonus money to the New York Yankees in exchange for Caleb Smith and Garrett Cooper. He began the 2018 season with the Tampa Tarpons of the High–A Florida State League, and earned midseason promotions to the Trenton Thunder of the Double–A Eastern League and Scranton/Wilkes-Barre RailRiders of the Triple–A International League.

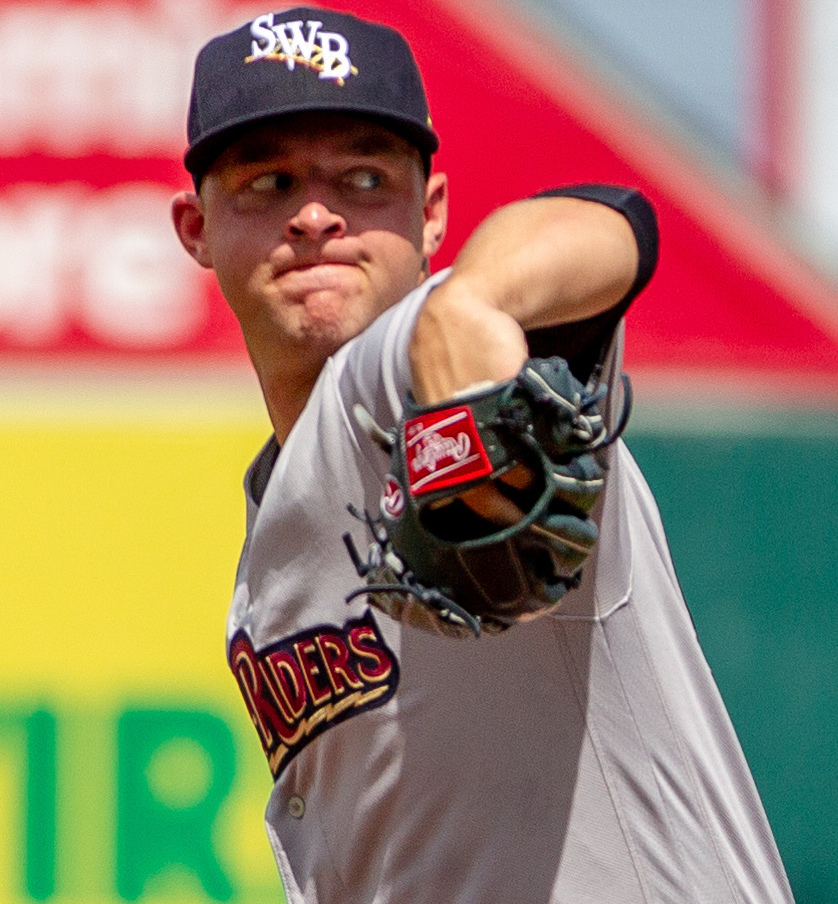
King with the RailRiders in 2018

The Yankees invited King to spring training as a non-roster player in 2019. He suffered a stress reaction in his pitching elbow and did not pitch in spring training. The Yankees promoted him to the major leagues on September 19. He made his major league debut on September 27 versus the Texas Rangers, pitching two innings in relief. In the shortened 60-game season in 2020, King recorded a 7.76 ERA in 26 2/3 innings pitched across nine appearances, including four games started.

Over the course of the 2021 season, King improved his slider with the assistance of teammate Corey Kluber. On June 4, during a game against the Boston Red Sox, King pitched an immaculate inning in the fourth inning, with three strikeouts on only nine pitches; it was the seventh in Yankees history and the first in the history of the Red Sox–Yankees rivalry. On July 8, King was placed on the injured list with a right middle finger contusion. He was later transferred to the 60-day injured list on July 27. King was activated on September 10. He finished the 2021 season with a 3.55 ERA in 63 1/3 innings, recording 62 strikeouts and 24 walks.

King opened the 2022 season in the Yankees bullpen. He earned his first major league save on April 14, 2022. While playing against the Baltimore Orioles on July 22, King left the game with an elbow injury. His right elbow was fractured, and he underwent surgery that ruled him out for the rest of the season.

In spring training in 2023, King suggested to manager Aaron Boone that he could be used as a starting pitcher. He started the season as a reliever, but injuries to Yankees starters led to King becoming a starter in August. He had a 2.75 ERA in 49 appearances for the season, with a 1.88 ERA in eight games started. Boone said he expected that King would pitch out of the starting rotation in 2024.

=== San Diego Padres ===
On December 6, 2023, the Yankees traded King, Drew Thorpe, Randy Vásquez, Jhony Brito, and Kyle Higashioka to the San Diego Padres in exchange for Juan Soto and Trent Grisham. King made 31 appearances (30 starts) for San Diego during the 2024 campaign, compiling a 13–9 record and 2.95 ERA with 201 strikeouts across 173 2/3 innings pitched.

On April 13, 2025, King pitched a complete-game shutout against the Colorado Rockies, the first complete game and the first complete-game shutout of his career. He threw 110 pitches, struck out eight, and allowed two hits and a walk. The game capped a three-game sweep in which the Rockies were held scoreless in all three games. The win also extended the Padres' franchise record of home wins to open a season to 10. On May 25, King was placed on the injured list due to inflammation in his throwing shoulder; he was transferred to the 60-day injured list on July 7. After King started against the Boston Red Sox on August 9, the Padres announced on August 14 that he would return to the injured list due to inflammation in his left knee. One month later, King would be activated once again from the injured list. Following the season, he declined the mutual option in his contract and became a free agent.

On December 18, 2025, King re-signed with the Padres on a three-year, $75 million contract. In the playoffs in 2026, he allowed just one hit in seven shutout innings in a 8–0 win over the Chicago Cubs in game 1 of the 2026 National League (NL) Wild Card Series. He held the Cubs hitless until one out in the seventh inning. In King's next start in game 2 of the the NL Division Series, the Milwaukee Brewers were hitless for the first 4 2/3 innings of game 2, giving him the two longest postseason no-hit bids in Padres history. Two days later, with the Padres top relievers Mason Miller and Adrián Morejón unavailable, King pitched in relief in the final two innings of game 3, earning a save in a 4–3 win.

On October 29, 2026, King declined his player option with the Padres and became a free agent.
