= Ron Marinaccio =

American baseball player (born 1995)

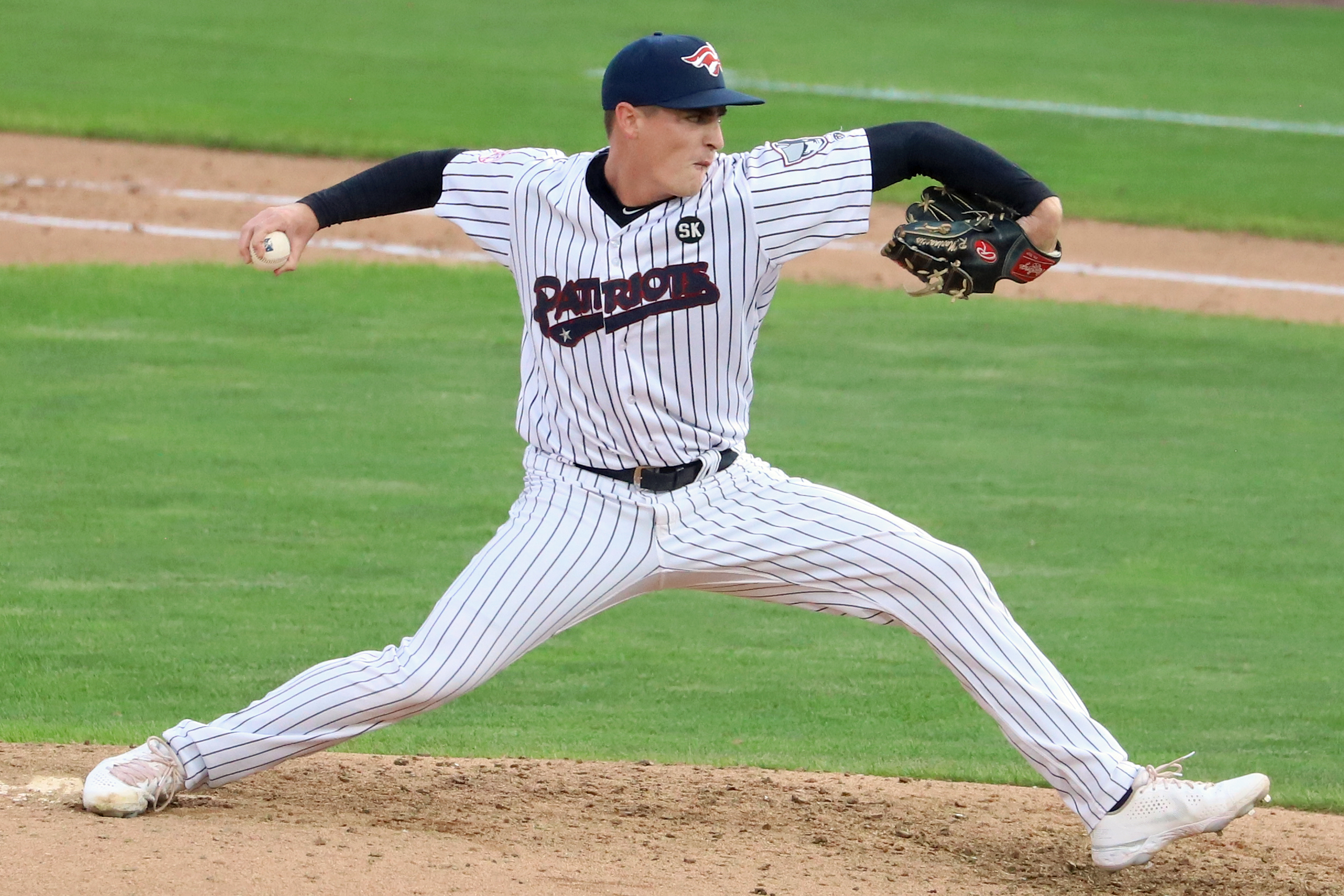
- Marinaccio with the Somerset Patriots in 2021

Free agent
- Pitcher
- Born: July 1, 1995 (age 31); Toms River, New Jersey, U.S.
- Bats: Right Throws: Right

MLB debut
- April 9, 2022, for the New York Yankees

MLB statistics (through 2026 season)
- Win–loss record: 7–5
- Earned run average: 3.98
- Strikeouts: 197
- Stats at Baseball Reference

Teams
- New York Yankees (2022–2024); San Diego Padres (2025–2026); Pittsburgh Pirates (2026); Cincinnati Reds (2026)

Ronald James Marinaccio (/ˌmeɪrəˈnɑːtʃioʊ/; born July 1, 1995) is an American professional baseball pitcher who is a free agent. He has previously played in Major League Baseball (MLB) for the New York Yankees, San Diego Padres, Pittsburgh Pirates, and Cincinnati Reds. He made his MLB debut in 2022.

== Amateur career ==
Marinaccio is from Toms River, New Jersey. He attended Toms River High School North, and played baseball for the school's team. He graduated from high school in 2013. Marinaccio attended the University of Delaware and played college baseball for the Delaware Fightin' Blue Hens. He missed what would have been his freshman season in 2014 when he had reconstructive surgery on his elbow and took a redshirt. After being a starting pitcher in 24 of his first 25 college games, he became a relief pitcher in 2017, his junior year.

== Professional career ==
=== New York Yankees ===
The New York Yankees drafted Marinaccio in the 19th round, with the 572nd overall selection, of the 2017 Major League Baseball draft. He made his professional debut with the rookie–level Gulf Coast League Yankees, posting a 2.30 ERA in 13 games. Marinaccio spent 2018 with the rookie–level Pulaski Yankees and Low–A Staten Island Yankees, posting an aggregate 4.76 ERA with 54 strikeouts and 4 saves across 17 relief outings for the two affiliates. Marinaccio spent the 2019 campaign with the Single–A Charleston RiverDogs, compiling a 4.18 ERA with 40 strikeouts and 4 saves across 18 appearances.

Marinaccio did not play in a game in 2020 due to the cancellation of the minor league season because of the COVID-19 pandemic. During the pandemic, Marinaccio worked with Daniel Moskos to improve his pitching. His velocity increased from 90–91 miles per hour (145–146 km/h) to 94–95 miles per hour (151–153 km/h). In 2021, Marinaccio pitched for the Double-A Somerset Patriots, where Moskos was the pitching coach. On August 8, 2021, while pitching for Somerset, Marinaccio pitched in a combined no-hitter started by Luis Severino and also pitched by Shawn Semple. The next day, the Yankees promoted him to the Triple–A Scranton/Wilkes-Barre RailRiders. He had a 1.82 earned run average (ERA) with 64 strikeouts in 39 2/3 innings pitched in 22 games with Somerset and a 2.36 ERA in 18 games for Scranton/Wilkes-Barre.

The Yankees added Marinaccio to their 40-man roster after the 2021 season. He was named to the Yankees Opening Day roster for the 2022 season. He made his major league debut on April 9. He had a 2.05 ERA in 40 games for the Yankees in 2022 and a 3.99 ERA in 45 games in 2023. The Yankees demoted Marinaccio to Scranton/Wilkes Barre during the 2023 season, and he allowed 15 earned runs in 15 1/3 innings while walking 18 for the RailRiders.

Marinaccio was optioned to Scranton/Wilkes-Barre to begin the 2024 season. In 16 appearances for the Yankees, he compiled a 3.86 ERA with 25 strikeouts across 23 1/3 innings pitched. Marinaccio was designated for assignment by the Yankees on September 20, 2024.

=== San Diego Padres ===
On September 23, 2024, Marinaccio was claimed off waivers by the Chicago White Sox. Marinaccio was designated for assignment by the White Sox on January 21, 2025.

On January 24, 2025, the White Sox traded Marinaccio to the San Diego Padres in exchange for cash considerations. He was optioned to the Triple-A El Paso Chihuahuas to begin the 2025 season. He appeared in seven games for the Padres, recording an 0.84 ERA and 12 strikeouts.

On June 15, 2026, Marinaccio was suspended for two games after intentionally hitting Baltimore Orioles shortstop Gunnar Henderson with a pitch. He made 33 appearances for San Diego, compiling a 1–0 record and 4.79 ERA with 38 strikeouts over 47 innings of work. On July 19, Marinaccio was designated for assignment by the Padres.

=== Pittsburgh Pirates ===
On July 23, 2026, the Padres traded Marinaccio to the Pittsburgh Pirates in exchange for international bonus pool considerations. He made four appearances for Pittsburgh, struggling to a 6.75 ERA with four strikeouts across 5 1/3 innings pitched. Marinaccio was designated for assignment by the Pirates on August 3.

=== Cincinnati Reds ===
On August 6, 2026, Marinaccio was claimed off of waivers by the Cincinnati Reds. He made four appearances for Cincinnati, allowing 10 runs on six hits with six strikeouts across 5 1/3 innings pitched. Marinaccio was designated for assignment by the Reds on August 17. He was released by Cincinnati after clearing waivers two days later.

=== Minnesota Twins ===
On August 22, 2026, Marinaccio signed a minor league contract with the Minnesota Twins. He played in one game with Triple-A St. Paul Saints throwing one inning of relief giving up three hits and three earned runs (27.00 ERA) and one strikeout. He elected free agency on November 2.

== Personal life ==
Marinaccio married Gianna Fiore in Fredon Township, New Jersey, on December 2, 2023.
