= Jhony Brito =

Dominican baseball player (born 1998)

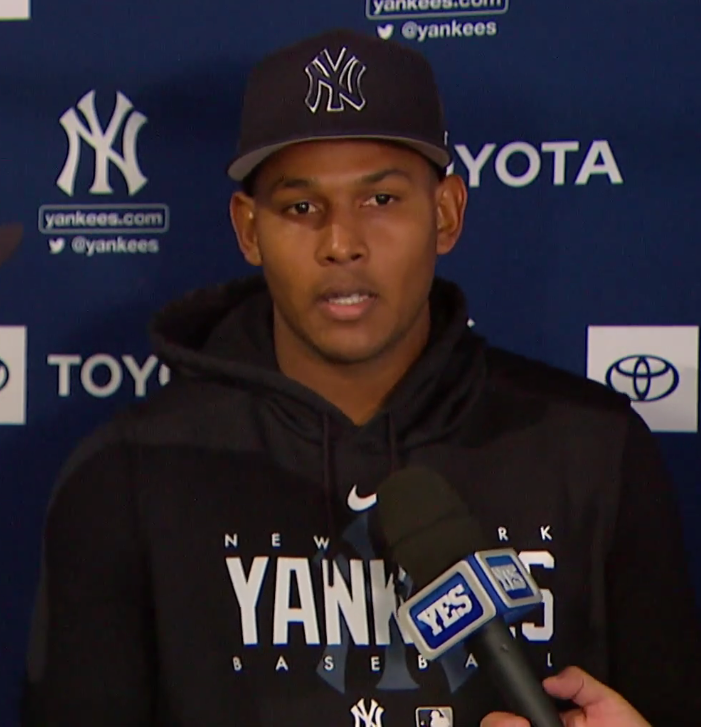
- Brito with the New York Yankees in 2023

San Diego Padres – No. 76
- Pitcher
- Born: February 17, 1998 (age 28); Puerto Plata, Dominican Republic
- Bats: Right Throws: Right

MLB debut
- April 2, 2023, for the New York Yankees

MLB statistics (through 2026 season)
- Win–loss record: 10–9
- Earned run average: 4.15
- Strikeouts: 107
- Stats at Baseball Reference

Teams
- New York Yankees (2023); San Diego Padres (2024, 2026–present)

Jhony Rafael Brito (born February 17, 1998) is a Dominican professional baseball pitcher for the San Diego Padres of Major League Baseball (MLB). He has previously played in MLB for the New York Yankees.

== Career ==
=== New York Yankees ===
Brito signed with the New York Yankees as an international free agent on November 9, 2015. He made his professional debut in 2016 with the Dominican Summer League Yankees. Brito spent the 2017 season with the Low-A Staten Island Yankees, making three scoreless starts and with eight strikeouts He underwent Tommy John surgery later that season, ending his year and causing him to miss the entirety of the 2018 season as well. He returned in 2019 to play with the Single-A Charleston River Dogs, appearing in 22 games (9 starts) and posting a 6–4 win–loss record and 3.58 earned run average (ERA) with 79 strikeouts and two saves in 100 2/3 innings pitched.

Brito did not play in a game in 2020 due to the cancellation of the minor league season because of the COVID-19 pandemic. In 2021 he split the year between the High-A Hudson Valley Renegades and Double-A Somerset Patriots, making 22 starts in total and registering a 7–7 record and 3.55 ERA with 118 strikeouts in 116 2/3 innings pitched. Brito spent the 2022 season with Somerset and the Triple-A Scranton/Wilkes-Barre RailRiders, pitching to a cumulative 11–4 record and 2.96 ERA with 91 strikeouts in 112 2/3 innings across 26 games (23 starts).

On November 10, 2022, the Yankees selected Brito to the 40-man roster to protect him from the Rule 5 draft. Brito was initially optioned to the Triple-A Scranton/Wilkes-Barre to begin the 2023 season. However, after Luis Severino suffered a lat injury, Brito was added to the major league rotation to begin the year. He made his major league debut on April 2. On May 20, Brito was optioned to Triple-A Scranton to make space on the roster for Severino's return.

=== San Diego Padres ===
On December 6, 2023, the Yankees traded Brito, Michael King, Drew Thorpe, Randy Vásquez, and Kyle Higashioka to the San Diego Padres in exchange for Juan Soto and Trent Grisham. He made 26 appearances for the Padres in 2024, recording a 4.12 ERA with 29 strikeouts across 43 2/3 innings pitched. Brito suffered an injury while playing with the Triple–A El Paso Chihuahuas, which was later specified as a right elbow strain. He was placed on the 60–day injured list on September 22, 2024, ending his season.

On April 3, 2025, Brito was placed back on the 60-day injured list with a right forearm strain. On May 12, the Padres announced that Brito had undergone an internal brace surgery to address his UCL as well as a flexor tendon repair. He was subsequently ruled out for the remainder of the season and likely part of the 2026 campaign.

On June 5, 2026, Brito was activated from the injured list and optioned to Triple-A El Paso.
