= 2022 New York Yankees season =

Season for the Major League Baseball team the New York Yankees

2022 New York Yankees
- American League East champions
- League: American League
- Division: East
- Ballpark: Yankee Stadium
- City: New York
- Record: 99–63 (.611)
- Divisional place: 1st
- Owners: Yankee Global Enterprises
- President: Randy Levine
- General managers: Brian Cashman
- Managers: Aaron Boone
- Television: YES Network; Amazon Prime Video (Michael Kay, Ryan Ruocco, several others as analysts)
- Radio: WFAN SportsRadio 66 AM / 101.9 FM; New York Yankees Radio Network (John Sterling, Suzyn Waldman); WADO 1280 AM TUDN Radio; Cadena Radio Yankees (Francisco Rivera, Rickie Ricardo)

The 2022 New York Yankees season was the 120th season for the New York Yankees franchise in Major League Baseball.

On December 2, 2021, Commissioner of Baseball Rob Manfred announced a lockout of players, following expiration of the collective bargaining agreement (CBA) between the league and the Major League Baseball Players Association (MLBPA). On March 10, 2022, MLB and the MLBPA agreed to a new CBA, ending the lockout. Although MLB had previously announced that several series would be cancelled due to the lockout, the CBA provided for a 162-game season, with originally canceled games to be made up via doubleheaders. Opening Day was at the time scheduled for April 7, but was postponed due to inclement weather.

Local television broadcast of Yankee games was split between the YES Network (which this season marked its 20th foundation anniversary) and Amazon Prime Video, leaving the Yankees without a local over-the-air broadcaster for the first season since 1946, after which they partnered with WABD-TV (now WNYW Fox 5). Michael Kay celebrated his 30th season calling Yankees games, having joined the broadcast team in 1992.

The Yankees were 64–28 in the first part of the season prior to the All-Star break, then went 35–35 in the second, failing to win 100 games despite being on track to do so in June. They nonetheless clinched their 30th straight season with a winning record with a win against the Twins on September 7.

The Yankees clinched a postseason spot on September 22 with a walk-off 5–4 win against the Red Sox. They won the American League East title, a first-round bye, and defeated the Cleveland Guardians in the American League Division Series in five games. However, they fell to the eventual World Series champion Houston Astros in the American League Championship Series in a four-game sweep, the first sweep in a best-of-seven series since the 2012 American League Championship Series (where the Yankees were swept by the Detroit Tigers).

On October 4, Aaron Judge hit his 62nd home run, breaking the American League single-season home run record set in 1961 by Roger Maris. That same night, Gerrit Cole recorded his 249th strikeout, breaking the Yankees single-season strikeout record set in 1978 by Ron Guidry. Additionally, Cole became the first and only right-handed pitcher in Yankees history to lead all of MLB in strikeouts in a single season and the first Yankee to lead the American League in strikeouts since Al Downing in 1964. This was the first season in Yankees history where the team carried both the MLB home run and strikeout leaders in the same season.

From May 24 to June 23, the Yankees won 15 straight games at home, a feat last accomplished by the team in 1961. On June 25, the Yankees lost a combined no-hitter to the Houston Astros, the first time the Yankees were no-hit since the Astros did so in the old Yankee Stadium on June 11, 2003.

On August 21, the Yankees celebrated "Paul O'Neill Day," retiring his No. 21 and placing his plaque in Monument Park at Yankee Stadium. O'Neill became the 23rd Yankee in franchise history to be so honored.

The Yankees also won the Rawlings Gold Glove Team Award, becoming the third team to do so (after the Cleveland Indians in 2020 and the Houston Astros in 2021) since the award's introduction in 2020. Two Yankees were also awarded Gold Gloves: utility man DJ LeMahieu, and catcher Jose Trevino, who won the Platinum Glove Award.

== Offseason ==
=== Lockout ===
The expiration of the league's collective bargaining agreement (CBA) with the Major League Baseball Players Association occurred on December 1, 2021, with no new agreement in place. As a result, the team owners voted unanimously to lockout the players stopping all free agency and trades.

The parties came to an agreement on a new CBA on March 10, 2022.

=== Rule changes ===
Pursuant to the new CBA, several new rules were instituted for the 2022 season. The National League adopted the designated hitter full-time, a draft lottery was implemented, the postseason expanded from ten teams to twelve (regular season tie-breakers will be abolished, to compensate), and advertising patches appeared on player uniforms and helmets for the first time.

=== Transactions ===
==== 2021 ====
- November 10 – Joely Rodriguez re-signs with the Yankees on a 1-year, $2 million contract.
- November 19 – acquired first baseman T.J. Rumfield and left-handed pitcher Joel Valdez from the Philadelphia Phillies for right-handed pitcher Nick Nelson and catcher Donny Sands.
- November 30 – Gio Urshela re-signs with the Yankees on a 1-year, $6.55 million contract. Domingo German also re-signs with the Yankees on 1-year, $1.75 million contract and Lucas Luetge on a 1-year, $905,000 contract.

==== 2022 ====
- March 13 – signed outfielder Tim Locastro to a one-year contract.
- March 13 – acquired third baseman Josh Donaldson, shortstop Isiah Kiner-Falefa and catcher Ben Rortvedt from the Minnesota Twins in exchange for Gary Sánchez and Gio Urshela. The Yankees take on Donaldson's $50 million contract, the projected $4.9 million for Kiner-Falefa's salary, and Rortvedt's minimum salary.
- March 15 – re-signed first baseman Anthony Rizzo on a two-year, $32 million deal with an opt out after the first year.
- March 18 – acquired pitching prospect Justin Lang from the San Diego Padres in exchange for Luke Voit.
- April 2 – acquired catcher Jose Trevino from the Texas Rangers in exchange for right-handed pitcher Albert Abreu and left-handed pitcher Robert Ahlstrom.
- April 3 – acquired right-handed reliever Miguel Castro from the New York Mets in exchange for left-handed reliever Joely Rodríguez.
- April 4 – acquired right-handed relief pitcher David McKay from the Tampa Bay Rays in exchange for cash considerations.

== Regular season ==
=== Transactions ===
- May 26 – signed infielder Matt Carpenter to a 1-year, $1 million contract.
- June 3 – acquired first baseman and designated hitter Jake Bauers from the Cincinnati Reds in exchange for cash considerations.
- June 24 – re-signed outfielder Aaron Judge to a one-year, $19 million contract with additional $250,000 bonuses for winning each of the AL MVP Award and the World Series MVP Award.
- July 28 – acquired outfielder Andrew Benintendi from the Kansas City Royals in exchange for minor league pitchers Chandler Champlain, Beck Way, and TJ Sikkema.
- August 1 – acquired right-handed relief pitcher Scott Effross from the Chicago Cubs in exchange for minor league pitcher Hayden Wesneski.
- August 1 – acquired right-handed starting pitcher Frankie Montas and right-handed relief pitcher Lou Trivino from the Oakland Athletics in exchange for minor league pitchers Ken Waldichuk, JP Sears, Luis Medina, and second baseman Cooper Bowman.
- August 2 – traded Joey Gallo to the Los Angeles Dodgers for minor league prospect Clayton Beeter.
- August 2 – acquired outfielder Harrison Bader with a player to be named later or cash considerations from the St. Louis Cardinals in exchange for left-handed starting pitcher Jordan Montgomery.
- August 28 – signed left-handed relief pitcher Anthony Banda to a one-year contract.

== Season standings ==
=== American League East ===
AL East
| Team | W | L | Pct. | GB | Home | Road |
|---|---|---|---|---|---|---|
| New York Yankees | 99 | 63 | .611 | — | 57‍–‍24 | 42‍–‍39 |
| Toronto Blue Jays | 92 | 70 | .568 | 7 | 47‍–‍34 | 45‍–‍36 |
| Tampa Bay Rays | 86 | 76 | .531 | 13 | 51‍–‍30 | 35‍–‍46 |
| Baltimore Orioles | 83 | 79 | .512 | 16 | 45‍–‍36 | 38‍–‍43 |
| Boston Red Sox | 78 | 84 | .481 | 21 | 43‍–‍38 | 35‍–‍46 |

=== American Wild Card ===
Division leaders
| Team | W | L | Pct. |
|---|---|---|---|
| Houston Astros | 106 | 56 | .654 |
| New York Yankees | 99 | 63 | .611 |
| Cleveland Guardians | 92 | 70 | .568 |

Wild Card teams (Top 3 teams qualify for postseason)
| Team | W | L | Pct. | GB |
|---|---|---|---|---|
| Toronto Blue Jays | 92 | 70 | .568 | +6 |
| Seattle Mariners | 90 | 72 | .556 | +4 |
| Tampa Bay Rays | 86 | 76 | .531 | — |
| Baltimore Orioles | 83 | 79 | .512 | 3 |
| Chicago White Sox | 81 | 81 | .500 | 5 |
| Minnesota Twins | 78 | 84 | .481 | 8 |
| Boston Red Sox | 78 | 84 | .481 | 8 |
| Los Angeles Angels | 73 | 89 | .451 | 13 |
| Texas Rangers | 68 | 94 | .420 | 18 |
| Detroit Tigers | 66 | 96 | .407 | 20 |
| Kansas City Royals | 65 | 97 | .401 | 21 |
| Oakland Athletics | 60 | 102 | .370 | 26 |

=== Record against opponents ===
2022 American League record Source: MLB Standings Grid – 2022
| Team | BAL | BOS | CWS | CLE | DET | HOU | KC | LAA | MIN | NYY | OAK | SEA | TB | TEX | TOR | NL |
|---|---|---|---|---|---|---|---|---|---|---|---|---|---|---|---|---|
| Baltimore | — | 9–10 | 5–2 | 3–3 | 1–5 | 4–3 | 4–3 | 6–1 | 3–4 | 7–12 | 3–4 | 2–4 | 9–10 | 6–0 | 9–10 | 12–8 |
| Boston | 10–9 | — | 2–4 | 5–2 | 5–1 | 4–2 | 3–4 | 4–3 | 3–4 | 6–13 | 5–1 | 6–1 | 7–12 | 6–1 | 3–16 | 9–11 |
| Chicago | 2–5 | 4–2 | — | 7–12 | 12–7 | 3–4 | 9–10 | 3–4 | 9–10 | 3–4 | 5–2 | 4–2 | 4–2 | 3–4 | 2–4 | 11–9 |
| Cleveland | 3–3 | 2–5 | 12–7 | — | 10–9 | 3–4 | 12–7 | 3–4 | 13–6 | 1–5 | 6–1 | 1–6 | 4–2 | 5–1 | 5–2 | 12–8 |
| Detroit | 5–1 | 1–5 | 7–12 | 9–10 | — | 0–7 | 10–9 | 3–3 | 8–11 | 1–5 | 2–5 | 1–6 | 2–5 | 4–3 | 2–5 | 11–9 |
| Houston | 3–4 | 2–4 | 4–3 | 4–3 | 7–0 | — | 5–2 | 13–6 | 6–0 | 5–2 | 12–7 | 12–7 | 5–1 | 14–5 | 2–4 | 12–8 |
| Kansas City | 3–4 | 4–3 | 10–9 | 7–12 | 9–10 | 2–5 | — | 3–3 | 7–12 | 1–6 | 3–3 | 2–4 | 3–4 | 2–4 | 2–5 | 7–13 |
| Los Angeles | 1–6 | 3–4 | 4–3 | 4–3 | 3–3 | 6–13 | 3–3 | — | 4–2 | 2–4 | 12–7 | 10–9 | 2–5 | 9–10 | 3–4 | 7–13 |
| Minnesota | 4–3 | 4–3 | 10–9 | 6–13 | 11–8 | 0–6 | 12–7 | 2–4 | — | 2–5 | 5–1 | 4–3 | 4–2 | 2–5 | 4–3 | 8–12 |
| New York | 12–7 | 13–6 | 4–3 | 5–1 | 5–1 | 2–5 | 6–1 | 4–2 | 5–2 | — | 5–2 | 2–4 | 11–8 | 4–3 | 11–8 | 10–10 |
| Oakland | 4–3 | 1–5 | 2–5 | 1–6 | 5–2 | 7–12 | 3–3 | 7–12 | 1–5 | 2–5 | — | 8–11 | 3–4 | 8–11 | 3–3 | 5–15 |
| Seattle | 4–2 | 1–6 | 2–4 | 6–1 | 6–1 | 7–12 | 4–2 | 9–10 | 3–4 | 4–2 | 11–8 | — | 2–5 | 14–5 | 5–2 | 12–8 |
| Tampa Bay | 10–9 | 12–7 | 2–4 | 2–4 | 5–2 | 1–5 | 4–3 | 5–2 | 2–4 | 8–11 | 4–3 | 5–2 | — | 4–3 | 10–9 | 12–8 |
| Texas | 0–6 | 1–6 | 4–3 | 1–5 | 3–4 | 5–14 | 4–2 | 10–9 | 5–2 | 3–4 | 11–8 | 5–14 | 3–4 | — | 2–4 | 11–9 |
| Toronto | 10–9 | 16–3 | 4–2 | 2–5 | 5–2 | 4–2 | 5–2 | 4–3 | 3–4 | 8–11 | 3–3 | 2–5 | 9–10 | 4–2 | — | 13–7 |

Updated with the results of all games through October 5, 2022.

== Game log ==
Legend
| | Yankees win |
| | Yankees loss |
| | Postponement |
| **Bold** | Yankees team member |

2022 game log: 99–63 (Home: 57–24; Away: 42–39)
April: 15–6 (Home: 10–3; Away: 5–3)

| # | Date | Opponent | Score | Win | Loss | Save | Stadium | Attendance | Record |
|---|---|---|---|---|---|---|---|---|---|
| 1 | April 8 | Red Sox | 6–5 (11) | **King** (1–0) | Crawford (0–1) | — | **Yankee Stadium** | 46,097 | 1–0 |
| 2 | April 9 | Red Sox | 4–2 | **Luetge** (1–0) | Pivetta (0–1) | **Chapman** (1) | **Yankee Stadium** | 46,882 | 2–0 |
| 3 | April 10 | Red Sox | 3–4 | Crawford (1–1) | **Schmidt** (0–1) | Diekman (1) | **Yankee Stadium** | 40,108 | 2–1 |
| 4 | April 11 | Blue Jays | 0–3 | Manoah (1–0) | **Taillon** (0–1) | Romano (3) | **Yankee Stadium** | 26,211 | 2–2 |
| 5 | April 12 | Blue Jays | 4–0 | **Holmes** (1–0) | Kikuchi (0–1) | — | **Yankee Stadium** | 25,068 | 3–2 |
| 6 | April 13 | Blue Jays | 4–6 | Cimber (2–0) | **Green** (0–1) | Romano (4) | **Yankee Stadium** | 30,109 | 3–3 |
| 7 | April 14 | Blue Jays | 3–0 | **Severino** (1–0) | Gausman (0–1) | **King** (1) | **Yankee Stadium** | 37,255 | 4–3 |
| 8 | April 15 | @ Orioles | 1–2 (11) | Krehbiel (1–0) | **Schmidt** (0–2) | — | Camden Yards | 32,197 | 4–4 |
| 9 | April 16 | @ Orioles | 5–2 | **Sears** (1–0) | Lakins Sr. (0–1) | **Holmes** (1) | Camden Yards | 28,179 | 5–4 |
| 10 | April 17 | @ Orioles | 0–5 | López (1–1) | **Loáisiga** (0–1) | — | Camden Yards | 25,938 | 5–5 |
| 11 | April 19 | @ Tigers | 4–2 | **Schmidt** (1–2) | Alexander (0–1) | **Chapman** (2) | Comerica Park | 15,498 | 6–5 |
| 12 | April 20 | @ Tigers | 5–3 | **Green** (1–1) | Hutchison (0–1) | **Chapman** (3) | Comerica Park | 17,268 | 7–5 |
| 13 | April 21 | @ Tigers | 0–3 | Pineda (1–0) | **Montgomery** (0–1) | Soto (3) | Comerica Park | 21,529 | 7–6 |
| 14 | April 22 | Guardians | 4–1 | **Taillon** (1–1) | Morgan (1–1) | **Chapman** (4) | **Yankee Stadium** | 41,062 | 8–6 |
| 15 | April 23 | Guardians | 5–4 | **Castro** (1–0) | Clase (0–2) | — | **Yankee Stadium** | 39,180 | 9–6 |
| 16 | April 24 | Guardians | 10–2 | **Cole** (1–0) | Civale (0–2) | — | **Yankee Stadium** | 39,050 | 10–6 |
| 17 | April 26 | Orioles | 12–8 | **Severino** (2–0) | Lyles (1–2) | — | **Yankee Stadium** | 28,596 | 11–6 |
| 18 | April 27 | Orioles | 5–2 | **King** (2–0) | Krehbiel (1–2) | **Holmes** (2) | **Yankee Stadium** | 31,122 | 12–6 |
| 19 | April 28 | Orioles | 10–5 | **Castro** (2–0) | Zimmermann (1–1) | — | **Yankee Stadium** | 29,268 | 13–6 |
| 20 | April 29 | @ Royals | 12–2 (8) | **Cortés Jr.** (1–0) | Bubic (0–2) | — | Kauffman Stadium | 16,460 | 14–6 |
| 21 | April 30 | @ Royals | 3–0 | **Cole** (2–0) | Hernández (0–1) | **Chapman** (5) | Kauffman Stadium | 23,965 | 15–6 |

May: 19–9 (Home: 8–4; Away: 11–5)

| # | Date | Opponent | Score | Win | Loss | Save | Stadium | Attendance | Record |
|---|---|---|---|---|---|---|---|---|---|
| 22 | May 1 | @ Royals | 6–4 | **Schmidt** (2–2) | Coleman (0–1) | **Chapman** (6) | Kauffman Stadium | 19,704 | 16–6 |
| 23 | May 2 | @ Blue Jays | 3–2 | **Holmes** (2–0) | García (0–2) | **Green** (1) | Rogers Centre | 18,577 | 17–6 |
| 24 | May 3 | @ Blue Jays | 9–1 | **Taillon** (2–1) | Cimber (4–1) | — | Rogers Centre | 22,491 | 18–6 |
| 25 | May 4 | @ Blue Jays | 1–2 | Kikuchi (1–1) | **Cortés Jr.** (1–1) | Romano (12) | Rogers Centre | 29,057 | 18–7 |
| 26 | May 8 | Rangers | 2–1 | **Holmes** (3–0) | King (1–1) | — | **Yankee Stadium** | see 2nd game | 19–7 |
| 27 | May 8 | Rangers | 2–4 | Richards (1–1) | **King** (2–1) | Barlow (4) | **Yankee Stadium** | 40,714 | 19–8 |
| 28 | May 9 | Rangers | 1–0 | **Holmes** (4–0) | Martin (0–3) | **Chapman** (7) | **Yankee Stadium** | 34,866 | 20–8 |
| 29 | May 10 | Blue Jays | 6–5 | **Peralta** (1–0) | Romano (1–2) | — | **Yankee Stadium** | 41,522 | 21–8 |
| 30 | May 11 | Blue Jays | 5–3 | **Taillon** (3–1) | Berríos (2–2) | **Chapman** (8) | **Yankee Stadium** | 42,105 | 22–8 |
| 31 | May 12 | @ White Sox | 15–7 | **Loáisiga** (1–1) | Kelly (0–1) | — | Guaranteed Rate Field | 20,050 | 23–8 |
| 32 | May 13 | @ White Sox | 10–4 | **Cole** (3–0) | Velasquez (2–3) | — | Guaranteed Rate Field | 28,877 | 24–8 |
| 33 | May 14 | @ White Sox | 2–3 | Hendriks (1–2) | **Chapman** (0–1) | — | Guaranteed Rate Field | 32,830 | 24–9 |
| 34 | May 15 | @ White Sox | 5–1 | **Cortés Jr.** (2–1) | Kopech (0–1) | — | Guaranteed Rate Field | 29,500 | 25–9 |
| 35 | May 16 | @ Orioles | 6–2 | **Severino** (3–0) | Bradish (1–2) | — | Camden Yards | 12,228 | 26–9 |
| 36 | May 17 | @ Orioles | 5–4 | **Taillon** (4–1) | Tate (0–2) | **Chapman** (9) | Camden Yards | 12,635 | 27–9 |
| 37 | May 18 | @ Orioles | 3–2 | **Cole** (4–0) | Lyles (2–4) | **Holmes** (3) | Camden Yards | 13,850 | 28–9 |
| 38 | May 19 | @ Orioles | 6–9 | Bautista (1–1) | **Luetge** (1–1) | — | Camden Yards | 23,819 | 28–10 |
| — | May 20 | White Sox | Postponed (rain); Makeup: May 22 | | | | | | |
| 39 | May 21 | White Sox | 7–5 | **Cortés Jr.** (3–1) | Keuchel (2–4) | **Holmes** (4) | **Yankee Stadium** | 44,001 | 29–10 |
| 40 | May 22 (1) | White Sox | 1–3 | Graveman (1–1) | **Chapman** (0–2) | Hendriks (13) | **Yankee Stadium** | see 2nd game | 29–11 |
| 41 | May 22 (2) | White Sox | 0–5 | Kopech (1–1) | **Loáisiga** (1–2) | — | **Yankee Stadium** | 36,167 | 29–12 |
| 42 | May 23 | Orioles | 4–6 | Lyles (3–4) | **Cole** (4–1) | López (5) | **Yankee Stadium** | 32,187 | 29–13 |
| 43 | May 24 | Orioles | 7–6 (11) | **Schmidt** (3–2) | Baker (1–2) | — | **Yankee Stadium** | 32,289 | 30–13 |
| 44 | May 25 | Orioles | 2–0 | **Sears** (2–0) | Wells (1–4) | **Holmes** (5) | **Yankee Stadium** | 39,154 | 31–13 |
| 45 | May 26 | @ Rays | 7–2 | **Cortés Jr.** (4–1) | Yarbrough (0–1) | — | Tropicana Field | 14,610 | 32–13 |
| 46 | May 27 | @ Rays | 2–0 | **Taillon** (5–1) | Springs (2–2) | **Holmes** (6) | Tropicana Field | 19,018 | 33–13 |
| 47 | May 28 | @ Rays | 1–3 | Feyereisen (4–0) | **Luetge** (1–2) | Poche (2) | Tropicana Field | 25,025 | 33–14 |
| 48 | May 29 | @ Rays | 2–4 | McClanahan (5–2) | **Severino** (3–1) | Feyereisen (1) | Tropicana Field | 25,025 | 33–15 |
| 49 | May 31 | Angels | 9–1 | **Montgomery** (1–1) | Syndergaard (4–3) | — | **Yankee Stadium** | 31,242 | 34–15 |

June: 22–6 (Home: 16–2; Away: 6–4)

| # | Date | Opponent | Score | Win | Loss | Save | Stadium | Attendance | Record |
|---|---|---|---|---|---|---|---|---|---|
| — | June 1 | Angels | Postponed (rain); Makeup: June 2 | | | | | | |
| 50 | June 2 (1) | Angels | 6–1 | **Cortés Jr.** (5–1) | Ohtani (3–4) | **Peralta** (1) | **Yankee Stadium** | 30,518 | 35–15 |
| 51 | June 2 (2) | Angels | 2–1 | **Taillon** (6–1) | Ortega (1–2) | **Holmes** (7) | **Yankee Stadium** | 33,476 | 36–15 |
| 52 | June 3 | Tigers | 13–0 | **Cole** (5–1) | Rodríguez (0–1) | — | **Yankee Stadium** | 42,026 | 37–15 |
| 53 | June 4 | Tigers | 3–0 | **Severino** (4–1) | Brieske (0–5) | **Holmes** (8) | **Yankee Stadium** | 38,106 | 38–15 |
| 54 | June 5 | Tigers | 5–4 (10) | **King** (3–1) | Soto (2–3) | — | **Yankee Stadium** | 38,030 | 39–15 |
| 55 | June 7 | @ Twins | 10–4 | **Luetge** (2–2) | Sands (0–2) | — | Target Field | 27,643 | 40–15 |
| 56 | June 8 | @ Twins | 1–8 | Archer (1–2) | **Cortés Jr.** (5–2) | — | Target Field | 22,286 | 40–16 |
| 57 | June 9 | @ Twins | 10–7 | **Castro** (3–0) | Durán (0–2) | **Holmes** (9) | Target Field | 26,646 | 41–16 |
| 58 | June 10 | Cubs | 2–1 (13) | **Marinaccio** (1–0) | Mills (0–1) | — | **Yankee Stadium** | 43,446 | 42–16 |
| 59 | June 11 | Cubs | 8–0 | **Montgomery** (2–1) | Swarmer (1–1) | — | **Yankee Stadium** | 38,043 | 43–16 |
| 60 | June 12 | Cubs | 18–4 | **Taillon** (7–1) | Thompson (6–2) | **Bañuelos** (1) | **Yankee Stadium** | 39,114 | 44–16 |
| 61 | June 14 | Rays | 2–0 | **Cole** (6–1) | Kluber (3–3) | **Holmes** (10) | **Yankee Stadium** | 35,692 | 45–16 |
| 62 | June 15 | Rays | 4–3 | **Cortés Jr.** (6–2) | McClanahan (7–3) | **Holmes** (11) | **Yankee Stadium** | 35,104 | 46–16 |
| 63 | June 16 | Rays | 2–1 | **King** (4–1) | Armstrong (0–1) | — | **Yankee Stadium** | 39,469 | 47–16 |
| 64 | June 17 | @ Blue Jays | 12–3 | **Montgomery** (3–1) | Stripling (3–2) | — | Rogers Centre | 44,688 | 48–16 |
| 65 | June 18 | @ Blue Jays | 4–0 | **Taillon** (8–1) | Manoah (8–2) | — | Rogers Centre | 45,055 | 49–16 |
| 66 | June 19 | @ Blue Jays | 9–10 | García (1–3) | **Peralta** (1–1) | Romano (17) | Rogers Centre | 44,395 | 49–17 |
| 67 | June 20 | @ Rays | 4–2 | **Peralta** (2–1) | Adam (0–2) | — | Tropicana Field | 16,504 | 50–17 |
| 68 | June 21 | @ Rays | 4–5 | Armstrong (1–1) | **Cortés Jr.** (6–3) | Poche (5) | Tropicana Field | 20,688 | 50–18 |
| 69 | June 22 | @ Rays | 5–4 | **Schmidt** (4–2) | Garza Jr. (0–2) | **Holmes** (12) | Tropicana Field | 12,264 | 51–18 |
| 70 | June 23 | Astros | 7–6 | **Castro** (4–0) | Pressly (1–2) | — | **Yankee Stadium** | 44,071 | 52–18 |
| 71 | June 24 | Astros | 1–3 | Verlander (9–3) | **Severino** (4–2) | Montero (5) | **Yankee Stadium** | 47,528 | 52–19 |
| 72 | June 25 | Astros | 0–3 | Javier (5–3) | **Cole** (6–2) | Pressly (15) | **Yankee Stadium** | 45,076 | 52–20 |
| 73 | June 26 | Astros | 6–3 (10) | **King** (5–1) | Martinez (0–1) | — | **Yankee Stadium** | 44,028 | 53–20 |
| 74 | June 27 | Athletics | 9–5 | **Abreu** (1–0) | Puk (1–1) | — | **Yankee Stadium** | 33,168 | 54–20 |
| 75 | June 28 | Athletics | 2–1 | **Sears** (3–0) | Montas (3–8) | **Holmes** (13) | **Yankee Stadium** | 38,051 | 55–20 |
| 76 | June 29 | Athletics | 5–3 | **Taillon** (9–1) | Irvin (2–6) | **Holmes** (14) | **Yankee Stadium** | 39,647 | 56–20 |
| 77 | June 30 | @ Astros | 1–2 | Garcia (6–5) | **Severino** (4–3) | Pressly (17) | Minute Maid Park | 40,674 | 56–21 |

July: 13–13 (Home: 6–4; Away: 7–9)

| # | Date | Opponent | Score | Win | Loss | Save | Stadium | Attendance | Record |
|---|---|---|---|---|---|---|---|---|---|
| — | July 1 | @ Guardians | Postponed (inclement weather); Makeup July 2 | | | | | | |
| 78 | July 2 (1) | @ Guardians | 13–4 | **Cole** (7–2) | McCarty (0–2) | — | Progressive Field | 21,203 | 57–21 |
| 79 | July 2 (2) | @ Guardians | 6–1 | **Cortés Jr.** (7–3) | Civale (2–5) | **Holmes** (15) | Progressive Field | 29,236 | 58–21 |
| 80 | July 3 | @ Guardians | 0–2 | McKenzie (5–6) | **Montgomery** (3–2) | Clase (19) | Progressive Field | 26,113 | 58–22 |
| 81 | July 5 | @ Pirates | 2–5 | Quintana (2–4) | **Taillon** (9–2) | Bednar (13) | PNC Park | 37,733 | 58–23 |
| 82 | July 6 | @ Pirates | 16–0 | **Severino** (5–3) | Keller (2–6) | — | PNC Park | 32,414 | 59–23 |
| 83 | July 7 | @ Red Sox | 6–5 | **Cole** (8–2) | Winckowski (3–3) | **Holmes** (16) | Fenway Park | 36,876 | 60–23 |
| 84 | July 8 | @ Red Sox | 12–5 | **Castro** (5–0) | Seabold (0–2) | **Luetge** (1) | Fenway Park | 36,841 | 61–23 |
| 85 | July 9 | @ Red Sox | 5–6 (10) | Diekman (4–0) | **Peralta** (2–2) | — | Fenway Park | 36,945 | 61–24 |
| 86 | July 10 | @ Red Sox | 6–11 | Sawamura (1–1) | **Chapman** (0–3) | — | Fenway Park | 37,291 | 61–25 |
| 87 | July 12 | Reds | 3–4 | Sanmartin (2–4) | **Holmes** (4–1) | Díaz (3) | **Yankee Stadium** | 40,235 | 61–26 |
| 88 | July 13 | Reds | 7–6 (10) | **King** (6–1) | Díaz (2–1) | — | **Yankee Stadium** | 36,772 | 62–26 |
| 89 | July 14 | Reds | 6–7 (10) | Sanmartin (3–4) | **Luetge** (2–3) | Moreta (1) | **Yankee Stadium** | 41,311 | 62–27 |
| 90 | July 15 | Red Sox | 4–5 (11) | Houck (5–3) | **King** (6–2) | Brasier (1) | **Yankee Stadium** | 47,572 | 62–28 |
| 91 | July 16 | Red Sox | 14–1 | **Taillon** (10–2) | Pivetta (8–7) | **Weber** (1) | **Yankee Stadium** | 47,997 | 63–28 |
| 92 | July 17 | Red Sox | 13–2 | **Cole** (9–2) | Sale (0–1) | — | **Yankee Stadium** | 47,958 | 64–28 |
**92nd All-Star Game in Los Angeles, California**
| 93 | July 21 (1) | @ Astros | 2–3 | Neris (3–3) | **King** (6–3) | — | Minute Maid Park | 36,225 | 64–29 |
| 94 | July 21 (2) | @ Astros | 5–7 | García (8–5) | **Germán** (0–1) | Montero (7) | Minute Maid Park | 39,342 | 64–30 |
| 95 | July 22 | @ Orioles | 7–6 | **Luetge** (3–3) | Wells (7–6) | **Holmes** (17) | Camden Yards | 28,468 | 65–30 |
| 96 | July 23 | @ Orioles | 3–6 | Pérez (5–1) | **Cole** (9–3) | López (18) | Camden Yards | 36,361 | 65–31 |
| 97 | July 24 | @ Orioles | 6–0 | **Cortés Jr.** (8–3) | Kremer (3–2) | **Schmidt** (1) | Camden Yards | 25,623 | 66–31 |
| 98 | July 26 | @ Mets | 3–6 | Walker (8–2) | **Montgomery** (3–3) | Díaz (22) | Citi Field | 42,364 | 66–32 |
| 99 | July 27 | @ Mets | 2–3 | Lugo (2–2) | **Peralta** (2–3) | — | Citi Field | 43,693 | 66–33 |
| 100 | July 28 | Royals | 1–0 | **Holmes** (5–1) | Barlow (4–3) | — | **Yankee Stadium** | 43,836 | 67–33 |
| 101 | July 29 | Royals | 11–5 | **Abreu** (2–0) | Barlow (4–4) | — | **Yankee Stadium** | 42,481 | 68–33 |
| 102 | July 30 | Royals | 8–2 | **Cortés Jr.** (9–3) | Heasley (1–6) | **Schmidt** (2) | **Yankee Stadium** | 44,081 | 69–33 |
| 103 | July 31 | Royals | 6–8 | Clarke (2–1) | **Holmes** (5–2) | — | **Yankee Stadium** | 45,341 | 69–34 |

August: 10–18 (Home: 5–7; Away: 5–11)

| # | Date | Opponent | Score | Win | Loss | Save | Stadium | Attendance | Record |
|---|---|---|---|---|---|---|---|---|---|
| 104 | August 1 | Mariners | 7–2 | **Germán** (1–1) | Gonzales (6–11) | — | **Yankee Stadium** | 36,734 | 70–34 |
| 105 | August 2 | Mariners | 6–8 | Murfee (2–0) | **Luetge** (3–4) | Muñoz (2) | **Yankee Stadium** | 38,735 | 70–35 |
| 106 | August 3 | Mariners | 3–7 | Castillo (5–4) | **Cole** (9–4) | — | **Yankee Stadium** | 42,169 | 70–36 |
| 107 | August 5 | @ Cardinals | 3–4 | Pallante (5–4) | **Holmes** (5–3) | Helsley (10) | Busch Stadium | 46,940 | 70–37 |
| 108 | August 6 | @ Cardinals | 0–1 | Montgomery (4–3) | **Germán** (1–2) | Gallegos (11) | Busch Stadium | 48,581 | 70–38 |
| 109 | August 7 | @ Cardinals | 9–12 | Stratton (6–4) | **Abreu** (2–1) | Helsley (11) | Busch Stadium | 46,472 | 70–39 |
| 110 | August 8 | @ Mariners | 9–4 | **Taillon** (11–2) | Gilbert (10–5) | — | T-Mobile Park | 35,843 | 71–39 |
| 111 | August 9 | @ Mariners | 0–1 (13) | Brash (3–3) | **Loáisiga** (1–3) | — | T-Mobile Park | 38,804 | 71–40 |
| 112 | August 10 | @ Mariners | 3–4 | Murfee (3–0) | **Abreu** (2–2) | Sewald (15) | T-Mobile Park | 43,280 | 71–41 |
| 113 | August 12 | @ Red Sox | 2–3 (10) | Whitlock (3–2) | **Trivino** (1–7) | — | Fenway Park | 36,434 | 71–42 |
| 114 | August 13 | @ Red Sox | 3–2 | **Chapman** (1–3) | Schreiber (3–2) | **Effross** (2) | Fenway Park | 36,672 | 72–42 |
| 115 | August 14 | @ Red Sox | 0–3 | Wacha (7–1) | **Taillon** (11–3) | Whitlock (4) | Fenway Park | 36,581 | 72–43 |
| 116 | August 15 | Rays | 0–4 | Yarbrough (1–7) | **Cole** (9–5) | — | **Yankee Stadium** | 42,192 | 72–44 |
| 117 | August 16 | Rays | 1–3 | Springs (5–3) | **Cortés Jr.** (9–4) | Adam (7) | **Yankee Stadium** | 41,083 | 72–45 |
| 118 | August 17 | Rays | 8–7 (10) | **Chapman** (2–3) | Beeks (2–2) | — | **Yankee Stadium** | 42,512 | 73–45 |
| 119 | August 18 | Blue Jays | 2–9 | Berríos (9–5) | **Montas** (4–10) | — | **Yankee Stadium** | 41,419 | 73–46 |
| 120 | August 19 | Blue Jays | 0–4 | Gausman (9–9) | **Taillon** (11–4) | — | **Yankee Stadium** | 46,194 | 73–47 |
| 121 | August 20 | Blue Jays | 2–5 | Cimber (9–4) | **Cole** (9–6) | García (1) | **Yankee Stadium** | 45,538 | 73–48 |
| 122 | August 21 | Blue Jays | 4–2 | **Trivino** (2–7) | Cimber (9–5) | — | **Yankee Stadium** | 46,958 | 74–48 |
| 123 | August 22 | Mets | 4–2 | **Germán** (2–2) | Scherzer (9–3) | **Loáisiga** (1) | **Yankee Stadium** | 48,760 | 75–48 |
| 124 | August 23 | Mets | 4–2 | **Schmidt** (5–2) | Rodríguez (0–3) | **Peralta** (2) | **Yankee Stadium** | 49,217 | 76–48 |
| 125 | August 25 | @ Athletics | 13–4 | **Taillon** (12–4) | Kaprielian (3–8) | — | Oakland Coliseum | 10,876 | 77–48 |
| 126 | August 26 | @ Athletics | 3–2 | **Cole** (10–6) | Sears (5–1) | **Peralta** (3) | Oakland Coliseum | 16,821 | 78–48 |
| 127 | August 27 | @ Athletics | 2–3 (11) | Payamps (3–3) | **Trivino** (2–8) | — | Oakland Coliseum | 36,529 | 78–49 |
| 128 | August 28 | @ Athletics | 1–4 | Martínez (3–3) | **Schmidt** (5–3) | Puk (4) | Oakland Coliseum | 29,498 | 78–50 |
| 129 | August 29 | @ Angels | 3–4 | Suárez (5–6) | **Montas** (4–11) | Herget (4) | Angel Stadium | 44,537 | 78–51 |
| 130 | August 30 | @ Angels | 7–4 | **Weissert** (1–0) | Mayers (1–1) | — | Angel Stadium | 42,684 | 79–51 |
| 131 | August 31 | @ Angels | 2–3 | Sandoval (5–9) | **Cole** (10–7) | Herget (5) | Angel Stadium | 43,555 | 79–52 |

September: 17–8 (Home: 11–3; Away: 6–5)

| # | Date | Opponent | Score | Win | Loss | Save | Stadium | Attendance | Record |
|---|---|---|---|---|---|---|---|---|---|
| 132 | September 2 | @ Rays | 0–9 | Springs (7–4) | **Germán** (2–3) | — | Tropicana Field | 17,886 | 79–53 |
| 133 | September 3 | @ Rays | 1–2 | Kluber (10–7) | **Schmidt** (5–4) | Adam (8) | Tropicana Field | 21,754 | 79–54 |
| 134 | September 4 | @ Rays | 2–1 | **Montas** (5–11) | Armstrong (2–2) | **Holmes** (18) | Tropicana Field | 25,025 | 80–54 |
| 135 | September 5 | Twins | 5–2 | **Weissert** (2–0) | Megill (3–2) | **Holmes** (19) | **Yankee Stadium** | 38,446 | 81–54 |
| — | September 6 | Twins | Postponed (rain); Makeup: September 7 | | | | | | |
| 136 | September 7 (1) | Twins | 5–4 (12) | **Weissert** (3–0) | Megill (3–3) | — | **Yankee Stadium** | see 2nd game | 82–54 |
| 137 | September 7 (2) | Twins | 7–1 | **Cole** (11−7) | Ryan (10−8) | **Luetge** (2) | **Yankee Stadium** | 30,157 | 83–54 |
| 138 | September 8 | Twins | 3–4 | Jax (6−3) | **Peralta** (2−4) | Fulmer (3) | **Yankee Stadium** | 35,551 | 83–55 |
| 139 | September 9 | Rays | 2–4 | Rasmussen (10–4) | **Montas** (5–12) | Armstrong (2) | **Yankee Stadium** | 46,160 | 83–56 |
| 140 | September 10 | Rays | 10–3 | **Taillon** (13–4) | Kluber (10–8) | — | **Yankee Stadium** | 43,088 | 84–56 |
| 141 | September 11 | Rays | 10–4 | **Peralta** (3–4) | Patiño (1–2) | — | **Yankee Stadium** | 36,402 | 85–56 |
| 142 | September 13 | @ Red Sox | 7–6 (10) | **Holmes** (6–3) | Familia (2–3) | **Peralta** (4) | Fenway Park | 34,250 | 86–56 |
| 143 | September 14 | @ Red Sox | 5–3 | **Cortés Jr.** (10–4) | Bello (1–6) | **Holmes** (20) | Fenway Park | 36,581 | 87–56 |
| 144 | September 16 | @ Brewers | 6–7 | Rogers (4–7) | **Holmes** (6–4) | — | American Family Field | 36,011 | 87–57 |
| 145 | September 17 | @ Brewers | 1–4 | Woodruff (11–4) | **Taillon** (13–5) | Williams (13) | American Family Field | 41,210 | 87–58 |
| 146 | September 18 | @ Brewers | 12–8 | **Cole** (12–7) | Milner (3–3) | — | American Family Field | 35,964 | 88–58 |
| 147 | September 20 | Pirates | 9–8 | **Chapman** (3–3) | Crowe (5–10) | — | **Yankee Stadium** | 40,157 | 89–58 |
| 148 | September 21 | Pirates | 14–2 | **Severino** (6–3) | Contreras (5–5) | — | **Yankee Stadium** | 46,175 | 90–58 |
| 149 | September 22 | Red Sox | 5–4 (10) | **Holmes** (7–4) | Ort (1–2) | — | **Yankee Stadium** | 43,123 | 91–58 |
| 150 | September 23 | Red Sox | 5–4 | **Loáisiga** (2–3) | Strahm (3–4) | — | **Yankee Stadium** | 47,346 | 92–58 |
| 151 | September 24 | Red Sox | 7–5 | **Luetge** (4–4) | Schreiber (3–4) | **Effross** (3) | **Yankee Stadium** | 47,611 | 93–58 |
| 152 | September 25 | Red Sox | 2–0 (6) | **Cortés Jr.** (11–4) | Bello (2–7) | — | **Yankee Stadium** | 46,707 | 94–58 |
| 153 | September 26 | @ Blue Jays | 2–3 (10) | Mayza (8–0) | **Schmidt** (5–5) | — | Rogers Centre | 34,307 | 94–59 |
| 154 | September 27 | @ Blue Jays | 5–2 | **Taillon** (14–5) | Berríos (11–7) | **Trivino** (11) | Rogers Centre | 40,528 | 95–59 |
| 155 | September 28 | @ Blue Jays | 8–3 | **Cole** (13–7) | Mayza (8–1) | — | Rogers Centre | 37,008 | 96–59 |
| 156 | September 30 | Orioles | 1–2 | Lyles (12–11) | **Germán** (2–4) | Hall (1) | **Yankee Stadium** | 47,583 | 96–60 |

October: 3–3 (Home: 1–1; Away: 2–2)

| # | Date | Opponent | Score | Win | Loss | Save | Stadium | Attendance | Record |
|---|---|---|---|---|---|---|---|---|---|
| 157 | October 1 | Orioles | 8–0 | **Cortés Jr.** (12–4) | Voth (5–4) | — | **Yankee Stadium** | 45,428 | 97–60 |
| 158 | October 2 | Orioles | 1–3 | Gillaspie (1–0) | **Chapman** (3–4) | Tate (5) | **Yankee Stadium** | 44,332 | 97–61 |
| 159 | October 3 | @ Rangers | 3–1 | **Severino** (7–3) | Pérez (12–8) | **Effross** (4) | Globe Life Field | 35,906 | 98–61 |
| 160 | October 4 (1) | @ Rangers | 5–4 | **Chapman** (4–4) | Burke (7–5) | **Loáisiga** (2) | Globe Life Field | 30,553 | 99–61 |
| 161 | October 4 (2) | @ Rangers | 2–3 | Allard (1–2) | **Cole** (13–8) | Moore (4) | Globe Life Field | 38,832 | 99–62 |
| 162 | October 5 | @ Rangers | 2–4 | Otto (7–10) | **Germán** (2–5) | Moore (5) | Globe Life Field | 28,056 | 99–63 |

== Postseason ==
=== Postseason game log ===
2022 Postseason game log (3−6) (Home 2−3; Away 1−3)
American League Division Series: 3−2

| # | Date | Opponent | Stadium | Score | Win | Loss | Save | Attendance | Record |
|---|---|---|---|---|---|---|---|---|---|
| 1 | October 11 | Guardians | Yankee Stadium | 4–1 | Cole (1−0) | Quantrill (0−1) | — | 47,807 | 1–0 |
| — | October 13 | Guardians | Postponed (rain); Makeup October 14 | | | | | | |
| 2 | October 14 | Guardians | Yankee Stadium | 2–4 (10) | Clase (1–0) | Taillon (0–1) | — | 47,535 | 1–1 |
| 3 | October 15 | @ Guardians | Progressive Field | 5–6 | Morgan (1–0) | Schmidt (0–1) | — | 36,483 | 1–2 |
| 4 | October 16 | @ Guardians | Progressive Field | 4–2 | Cole (2–0) | Quantrill (0–2) | Peralta (1) | 36,728 | 2–2 |
| — | October 17 | Guardians | Postponed (rain); Makeup October 18 | | | | | | |
| 5 | October 18 | Guardians | Yankee Stadium | 5–1 | Cortés Jr. (1–0) | Civale (0–1) | — | 48,178 | 3–2 |

American League Championship Series: 0–4

| # | Date | Opponent | Stadium | Score | Win | Loss | Save | Attendance | Record |
|---|---|---|---|---|---|---|---|---|---|
| 1 | October 19 | @ Astros | Minute Maid Park | 2–4 | Verlander (1–0) | Schmidt (0–2) | Pressly (2) | 41,487 | 0–1 |
| 2 | October 20 | @ Astros | Minute Maid Park | 2–3 | Valdez (1–0) | Severino (0–1) | Pressly (3) | 41,700 | 0–2 |
| 3 | October 22 | Astros | Yankee Stadium | 0–5 | Javier (1–0) | Cole (2–1) | — | 47,569 | 0–3 |
| 4 | October 23 | Astros | Yankee Stadium | 5–6 | Neris (2–0) | Loáisiga (0–1) | Pressly (4) | 46,545 | 0–4 |

=== Postseason rosters ===
Playoff rosters
American League Division Series

- Pitchers: 30 Miguel Castro 35 Clay Holmes 40 Luis Severino 43 Jonathan Loáisiga 45 Gerrit Cole 50 Jameson Taillon 55 Domingo Germán 56 Lou Trivino 58 Wandy Peralta 63 Lucas Luetge 65 Nestor Cortés Jr. 86 Clarke Schmidt
- Catchers: 39 Jose Trevino 66 Kyle Higashioka
- Infielders: 12 Isiah Kiner-Falefa 14 Marwin González 24 Matt Carpenter 25 Gleyber Torres 28 Josh Donaldson 48 Anthony Rizzo
- Outfielders: 22 Harrison Bader 31 Aaron Hicks 33 Tim Locastro 95 Oswaldo Cabrera 99 Aaron Judge
- Designated hitters: 27 Giancarlo Stanton

American League Championship Series

- Pitchers: 30 Miguel Castro 35 Clay Holmes 40 Luis Severino 43 Jonathan Loáisiga 45 Gerrit Cole 47 Frankie Montas 50 Jameson Taillon 55 Domingo Germán 56 Lou Trivino 58 Wandy Peralta 65 Nestor Cortés Jr. 85 Greg Weissert 86 Clarke Schmidt
- Catchers: 39 Jose Trevino 66 Kyle Higashioka
- Infielders: 12 Isiah Kiner-Falefa 24 Matt Carpenter 25 Gleyber Torres 28 Josh Donaldson 48 Anthony Rizzo 91 Oswald Peraza
- Outfielders: 22 Harrison Bader 33 Tim Locastro 95 Oswaldo Cabrera 99 Aaron Judge
- Designated hitters: 27 Giancarlo Stanton

== Player stats ==
| = Indicates team leader |

| = Indicates league leader |

(Updated as of October 5)

=== Batting ===
Note: G = Games played; AB = At bats; R = Runs; H = Hits; 2B = Doubles; 3B = Triples; HR = Home runs; RBI = Runs batted in; AVG = Batting average; SB = Stolen bases

| Player | G | AB | R | H | 2B | 3B | HR | RBI | AVG | SB |
|---|---|---|---|---|---|---|---|---|---|---|
| Aaron Hicks | 130 | 384 | 54 | 83 | 9 | 2 | 8 | 40 | 0.216 | 10 |
| Aaron Judge | 157 | 570 | 133 | 177 | 28 | 0 | 62 | 131 | 0.311 | 16 |
| Andrew Benintendi | 33 | 114 | 14 | 29 | 9 | 1 | 2 | 12 | 0.254 | 4 |
| Anthony Rizzo | 130 | 465 | 77 | 104 | 21 | 1 | 32 | 75 | 0.224 | 6 |
| DJ LeMahieu | 125 | 467 | 74 | 122 | 18 | 0 | 12 | 46 | 0.261 | 4 |
| Estevan Florial | 17 | 31 | 4 | 3 | 0 | 0 | 0 | 1 | 0.097 | 2 |
| Giancarlo Stanton | 110 | 398 | 53 | 84 | 7 | 0 | 31 | 78 | 0.211 | 0 |
| Gleyber Torres | 140 | 526 | 73 | 135 | 28 | 1 | 24 | 76 | 0.257 | 10 |
| Harrison Bader | 14 | 46 | 3 | 10 | 3 | 0 | 0 | 9 | 0.217 | 2 |
| Isiah Kiner-Falefa | 142 | 483 | 66 | 126 | 20 | 0 | 4 | 48 | 0.261 | 22 |
| Joey Gallo | 82 | 233 | 32 | 37 | 4 | 1 | 12 | 24 | 0.159 | 2 |
| José Treviño | 115 | 335 | 39 | 83 | 12 | 1 | 11 | 43 | 0.248 | 2 |
| Josh Donaldson | 132 | 478 | 59 | 106 | 28 | 0 | 15 | 62 | 0.222 | 2 |
| Kyle Higashioka | 83 | 229 | 27 | 52 | 7 | 0 | 10 | 31 | 0.227 | 0 |
| Marwin González | 85 | 184 | 20 | 34 | 7 | 0 | 6 | 18 | 0.185 | 3 |
| Matt Carpenter | 47 | 128 | 28 | 39 | 9 | 0 | 15 | 37 | 0.305 | 0 |
| Miguel Andújar | 27 | 96 | 9 | 22 | 2 | 0 | 1 | 8 | 0.229 | 4 |
| Oswald Peraza | 18 | 49 | 8 | 15 | 3 | 0 | 1 | 2 | 0.306 | 2 |
| Oswaldo Cabrera | 44 | 154 | 21 | 38 | 8 | 1 | 6 | 19 | 0.247 | 3 |
| Rob Brantly | 1 | 3 | 0 | 1 | 1 | 0 | 0 | 0 | 0.333 | 0 |
| Ronald Guzmán | 3 | 6 | 0 | 0 | 0 | 0 | 0 | 0 | 0.000 | 0 |
| Tim Locastro | 38 | 43 | 13 | 8 | 1 | 0 | 2 | 4 | 0.186 | 8 |
| Team totals | 162 | 5422 | 807 | 1308 | 225 | 8 | 254 | 764 | 0.241 | 102 |

=== Pitching ===
Note: W = Wins; L = Losses; ERA = Earned run average; G = Games pitched; GS = Games started; SV = Saves; IP = Innings pitched; H = Hits allowed; R = Total runs allowed; ER = Earned runs allowed; BB = Walks allowed; K = Strikeouts

| Player | W | L | ERA | G | GS | SV | IP | H | R | ER | BB | K |
|---|---|---|---|---|---|---|---|---|---|---|---|---|
| Albert Abreu | 2 | 2 | 3.16 | 22 | 0 | 0 | 25.2 | 25 | 10 | 9 | 6 | 26 |
| Anthony Banda | 0 | 0 | 40.50 | 2 | 0 | 0 | 0.2 | 2 | 3 | 3 | 5 | 1 |
| Manny Bañuelos | 0 | 0 | 2.16 | 4 | 0 | 1 | 8.1 | 7 | 2 | 2 | 3 | 8 |
| Luke Bard | 0 | 0 | 0.00 | 1 | 0 | 0 | 1.0 | 0 | 0 | 0 | 0 | 0 |
| Jacob Barnes | 0 | 0 | 0.00 | 1 | 0 | 0 | 1.2 | 2 | 0 | 0 | 0 | 2 |
| Zach Britton | 0 | 0 | 13.50 | 3 | 0 | 0 | 0.2 | 1 | 1 | 1 | 6 | 1 |
| Miguel Castro | 5 | 0 | 4.03 | 34 | 0 | 0 | 29.0 | 27 | 16 | 13 | 15 | 31 |
| Aroldis Chapman | 4 | 4 | 4.46 | 43 | 0 | 9 | 36.1 | 24 | 18 | 18 | 28 | 43 |
| Gerrit Cole | 13 | 8 | 3.50 | 33 | 33 | 0 | 200.2 | 154 | 81 | 78 | 50 | 257 |
| Nestor Cortés Jr. | 12 | 4 | 2.44 | 28 | 28 | 0 | 158.1 | 108 | 44 | 43 | 38 | 163 |
| Scott Effross | 0 | 0 | 2.13 | 13 | 0 | 3 | 12.2 | 9 | 4 | 3 | 4 | 12 |
| Domingo Germán | 2 | 5 | 3.61 | 15 | 14 | 0 | 72.1 | 65 | 31 | 29 | 19 | 58 |
| Luis Gil | 0 | 0 | 9.00 | 1 | 1 | 0 | 4.0 | 5 | 4 | 4 | 2 | 5 |
| Chi Chi González | 0 | 0 | 1.93 | 1 | 1 | 0 | 4.2 | 4 | 1 | 1 | 3 | 3 |
| Marwin González | 0 | 0 | 0.00 | 1 | 0 | 0 | 0.1 | 0 | 0 | 0 | 0 | 0 |
| Chad Green | 1 | 1 | 3.00 | 14 | 0 | 1 | 15.0 | 13 | 6 | 5 | 5 | 16 |
| Shane Greene | 0 | 0 | 18.00 | 1 | 0 | 0 | 1.0 | 1 | 2 | 2 | 1 | 1 |
| Clay Holmes | 7 | 4 | 2.54 | 62 | 0 | 20 | 63.2 | 45 | 21 | 18 | 20 | 65 |
| Michael King | 6 | 3 | 2.29 | 34 | 0 | 1 | 51.0 | 35 | 15 | 13 | 16 | 66 |
| Jonathan Loáisiga | 2 | 3 | 4.13 | 50 | 0 | 2 | 48.0 | 43 | 25 | 22 | 19 | 37 |
| Lucas Luetge | 4 | 4 | 2.67 | 50 | 0 | 2 | 57.1 | 63 | 19 | 17 | 17 | 60 |
| Ron Marinaccio | 1 | 0 | 2.05 | 40 | 0 | 0 | 44.0 | 22 | 12 | 10 | 24 | 56 |
| David McKay | 0 | 0 | 0.00 | 2 | 0 | 0 | 2.0 | 1 | 0 | 0 | 2 | 1 |
| Frankie Montas | 1 | 3 | 6.35 | 8 | 8 | 0 | 39.2 | 46 | 28 | 28 | 15 | 33 |
| Jordan Montgomery | 3 | 3 | 3.69 | 21 | 21 | 0 | 114.2 | 103 | 48 | 47 | 23 | 97 |
| Wandy Peralta | 3 | 4 | 2.72 | 56 | 0 | 4 | 56.1 | 42 | 19 | 17 | 17 | 47 |
| Clarke Schmidt | 5 | 5 | 3.12 | 29 | 3 | 2 | 57.2 | 46 | 23 | 20 | 23 | 56 |
| JP Sears | 3 | 0 | 2.05 | 7 | 2 | 0 | 22.0 | 14 | 5 | 5 | 5 | 15 |
| Luis Severino | 7 | 3 | 3.18 | 19 | 19 | 0 | 102.0 | 72 | 37 | 36 | 30 | 112 |
| Jameson Taillon | 14 | 5 | 3.91 | 32 | 32 | 0 | 177.1 | 168 | 78 | 77 | 32 | 151 |
| Lou Trivino | 1 | 2 | 1.66 | 25 | 0 | 1 | 21.2 | 18 | 6 | 4 | 10 | 22 |
| Ryan Weber | 0 | 0 | 0.84 | 5 | 0 | 1 | 10.2 | 6 | 1 | 1 | 1 | 3 |
| Greg Weissert | 3 | 0 | 5.56 | 12 | 0 | 0 | 11.1 | 6 | 7 | 7 | 5 | 11 |
| Team totals | 99 | 63 | 3.30 | 162 | 162 | 47 | 1451.2 | 1177 | 567 | 532 | 444 | 1459 |

== Roster ==
2022 New York Yankees
Roster
| Pitchers: 84 Albert Abreu; 61 Anthony Banda; 68 Manny Bañuelos; 68 Luke Bard; 68 Jacob Barnes; 53 Zack Britton; 30 Miguel Castro; 54 Aroldis Chapman; 45 Gerrit Cole; 65 Nestor Cortés Jr.; 59 Scott Effross; 55 Domingo Germán; 81 Luis Gil; 70 Chi Chi González; 57 Chad Green; 61 Shane Greene; 35 Clay Holmes; 34 Michael King; 43 Jonathan Loáisiga; 63 Lucas Luetge; 97 Ron Marinaccio; 71 David McKay; 47 Frankie Montas; 47 Jordan Montgomery; 58 Wandy Peralta; 86 Clarke Schmidt; 92 JP Sears; 40 Luis Severino; 50 Jameson Taillon; 56 Lou Trivino; 85,92 Ryan Weber; 85 Greg Weissert | Catchers: 62 Rob Brantly; 66 Kyle Higashioka; 39 Jose Trevino; Infielders: 28 Josh Donaldson; 14 Marwin González; 29 Ronald Guzmán; 12 Isiah Kiner-Falefa; 26 DJ LeMahieu; 91 Oswald Peraza; 48 Anthony Rizzo; 25 Gleyber Torres | Outfielders: 41 Miguel Andújar; 22 Harrison Bader; 18 Andrew Benintendi; 95 Oswaldo Cabrera; 24 Matt Carpenter; 90 Estevan Florial; 13 Joey Gallo; 31 Aaron Hicks; 99 Aaron Judge; 33 Tim Locastro; 27 Giancarlo Stanton | Manager: 17 Aaron Boone; Coaches: 77 Matt Blake (pitching); 75 Travis Chapman (first base/infield); 79 Desi Druschel (assistant pitching); 78 Casey Dykes (asst. hitting); 60 Mike Harkey (bullpen); 74 Dillon Lawson (hitting); 64 Carlos Mendoza (bench); 56 Hensley Meulens (assistant hitting); 67 Luis Rojas (third base/outfield); 76 Tanner Swanson (quality control/catching); -- Aaron Barnett (bullpen catcher); -- Collin Theroux (bullpen catcher); -- Brett Weber (assistant coach/instant replay) |

== Farm system ==
| Level | Team | League | Manager |
|---|---|---|---|
| AAA | Scranton/Wilkes-Barre RailRiders | International League | Doug Davis |
| AA | Somerset Patriots | Eastern League | Julio Mosquera |
| High-A | Hudson Valley Renegades | South Atlantic League | Dan Fiorito |
| Low-A | Tampa Tarpons | Florida State League | Rachel Balkovec |
| Rookie | FCL Yankees | Florida Complex League | Tyson Blaser |
| Rookie | DSL Yankees 1 | Dominican Summer League | Rainiero Coa |
| Rookie | DSL Yankees 2 | Dominican Summer League | Victor Rey |
