= Isiah Kiner-Falefa =

American baseball player (born 1995)

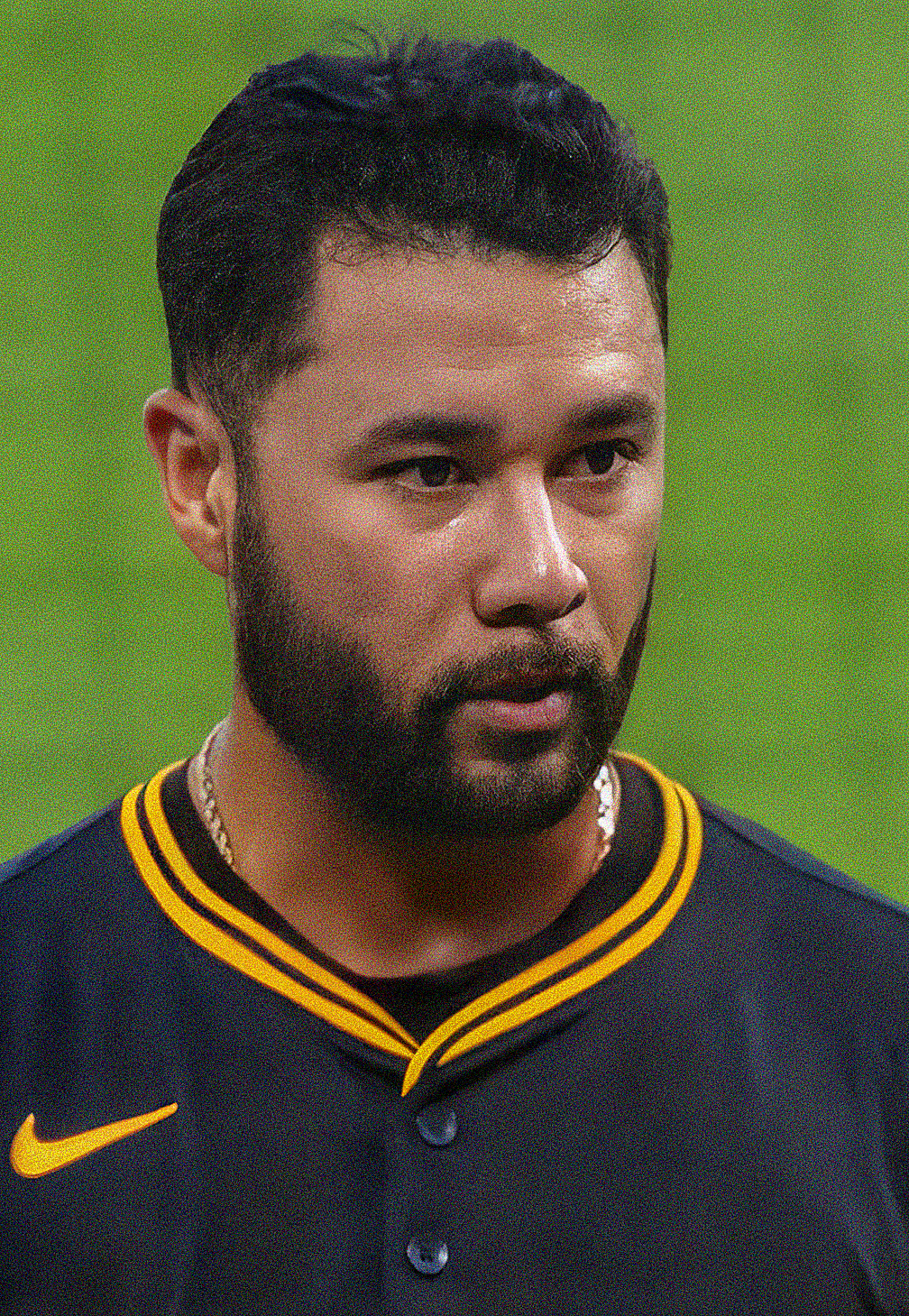
- Kiner-Falefa with the Pittsburgh Pirates in 2024

Free agent
- Utility player
- Born: March 23, 1995 (age 31); Honolulu, Hawaii, U.S.
- Bats: Right Throws: Right

MLB debut
- April 10, 2018, for the Texas Rangers

MLB statistics (through 2026 season)
- Batting average: .261
- Home runs: 38
- Runs batted in: 302
- Stats at Baseball Reference

Teams
- Texas Rangers (2018–2021); New York Yankees (2022–2023); Toronto Blue Jays (2024); Pittsburgh Pirates (2024–2025); Toronto Blue Jays (2025); Boston Red Sox (2026)

Career highlights and awards
- Gold Glove Award (2020)

Isiah Kiner-Falefa (born March 23, 1995), often abbreviated as IKF, is an American professional baseball utility player who is a free agent. He has previously played in Major League Baseball (MLB) for the Texas Rangers, New York Yankees, Toronto Blue Jays, Pittsburgh Pirates, and Boston Red Sox. Kiner-Falefa was selected by the Rangers in the fourth round of the 2013 MLB draft and made his MLB debut with the team in 2018. He won the American League (AL) Gold Glove Award as a third baseman in 2020.

== Early life ==
Kiner-Falefa was born on March 23, 1995, in Honolulu, Hawaii. Raised in Honolulu, he was introduced to baseball at the age of five by his grandfather. By the time he reached seventh grade, his talent was evident, prompting his parents to enroll him in travel teams to help him gain exposure through tournaments across the United States.

Kiner-Falefa attended Mid-Pacific Institute in Honolulu, graduating in 2013. Recognizing the underrepresentation of Pacific Islanders in baseball, he traveled to Samoa during this period to instruct children in the sport, reflecting his commitment to promoting youth baseball development.

== Professional career ==
=== Draft and minor leagues ===
Kiner-Falefa was selected 130th overall by the Texas Rangers in the fourth round of the 2013 MLB draft on June 7, directly out of high school. Two days later, he signed a professional contract with the Rangers on June 9, and was assigned to the Rookie-level AZL Rangers on June 20, where he began his professional career. That day, Kiner-Falefa made his Minor League Baseball (MiLB) debut, playing in an away game against the AZL Royals at Surprise Stadium in Surprise, Arizona. He failed to record a hit in four at bats, going 0-for-4, but reached base on a fielding error to record one stolen base and one run in a 9–4 victory over the Royals. Kiner-Falefa finished the 2013 season batting .322/.388/.356 with 11 runs batted in (RBIs) in 41 games. Defensively, he played the second base and shortstop positions throughout the season.

In 2014, Kiner-Falefa played for three teams: the AZL Rangers, the Short-Season A Spokane Indians, and the Class A Hickory Crawdads, batting a combined .246/.316/.287 with 16 RBIs in 79 games.

In 2015, Kiner-Falefa split time between the Crawdads and the Advanced-A High Desert Mavericks, batting a combined .296/.356/.341 with 40 RBIs in 98 games.

In 2016, Kiner-Falefa primarily played for the Double-A Frisco RoughRiders, with a brief three-game stint back with the AZL Rangers, batting a combined .252/.337/.282 with 28 RBIs in 111 games. During the off-season, Kiner-Falefa played for the Surprise Saguaros in the Arizona Fall League (AFL), batting .194/.350/.194 with three RBIs in 10 games.

Kiner-Falefa remained with the RoughRiders in 2017, batting .288/.350/.390 with five home runs and 48 RBIs in 129 games. After the 2017 season, the Texas Rangers added Kiner-Falefa to their 40-man roster.

Kiner-Falefa started the 2018 season with the Triple-A Round Rock Express, batting .200/.333/.200 with one RBI in five games before being called up to the MLB by the Texas Rangers on April 10, where he remained for the rest of the season. Throughout his minor league career within the Texas Rangers system, Kiner-Falefa demonstrated versatility by playing multiple defensive positions, including catcher, second baseman, third baseman, and shortstop.

=== Texas Rangers (2018–2021) ===
Kiner-Falefa made his Major League Baseball (MLB) debut on April 10, 2018, playing for the Texas Rangers in a home game against the Los Angeles Angels at Globe Life Park in Arlington, Texas. Four days later, on April 14, he hit his first career home run in a game against the Houston Astros. On June 20, he achieved a unique milestone by catching for pitcher Austin Bibens-Dirkx in a game against the Kansas City Royals. This marked the first time in MLB history that both members of a battery had hyphenated last names. Kiner-Falefa finished the 2018 season batting .261/.325/.357 with four home runs and 34 RBIs in 111 games. Defensively, he demonstrated positional versatility by playing as a catcher, second baseman, third baseman, and shortstop.

Kiner-Falefa began the 2019 season sharing catching duties with veteran Jeff Mathis. He was placed on the injured list on June 7 and was recalled on August 2 to serve as a utility infielder and third-string catcher. He finished the 2019 season batting .238/.299/.322 with one home run and 21 RBIs in 65 games.

Kiner-Falefa finished the pandemic-shortened 2020 season batting .280/.329/.370 with three home runs and 10 RBIs in 58 games. He received his first career MLB award, the American League (AL) Gold Glove Award, for his defensive performance as a third baseman.

Kiner-Falefa finished the 2021 season batting .271/.312/.357 with eight home runs and 53 RBIs in 158 games. He led the MLB with 136 singles. Defensively, Kiner-Falefa moved to shortstop. He led the MLB with 436 assists and led the shortstop position with 98 double plays turned.

=== New York Yankees (2022–2023) ===
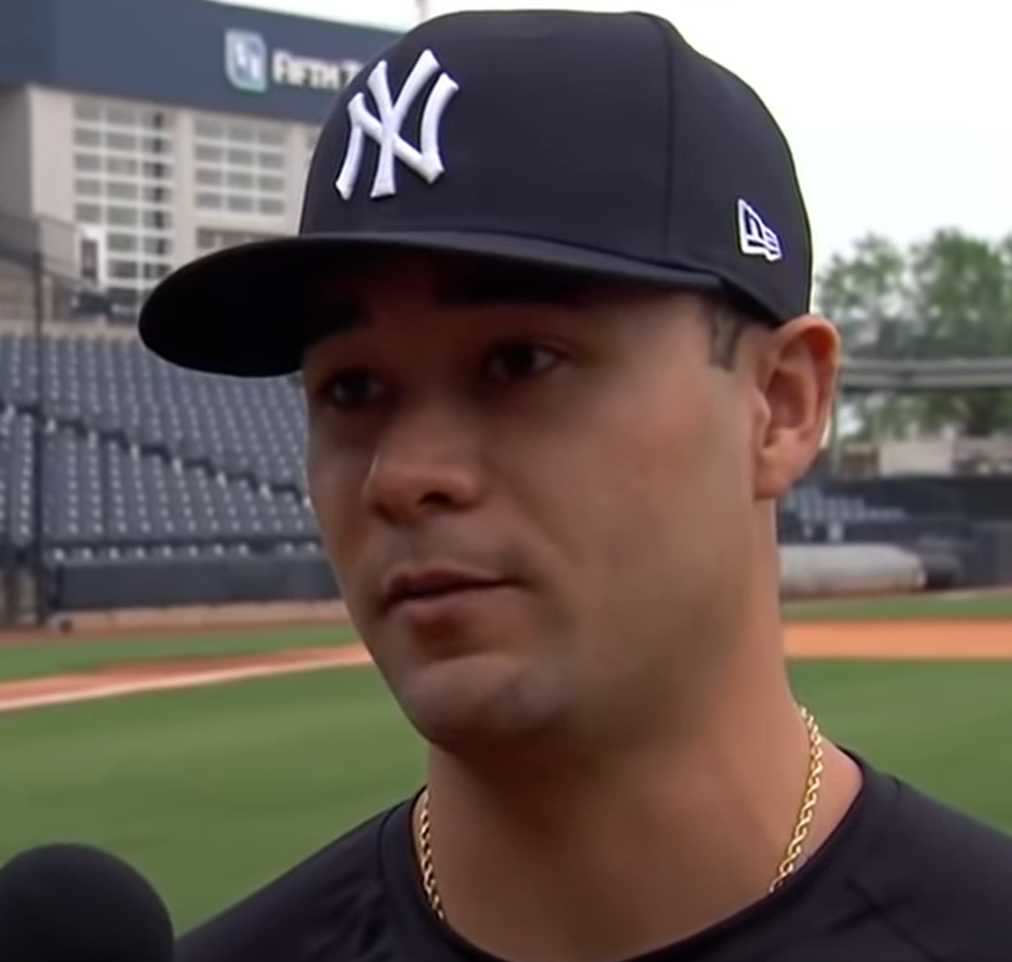
Kiner-Falefa with the New York Yankees during 2022 spring training at George M. Steinbrenner Field

Before the 2022 season, the Texas Rangers traded Kiner-Falefa with pitcher Ronny Henriquez to the Minnesota Twins for Mitch Garver on March 12, 2022. The following day, the Twins traded Kiner-Falefa with Ben Rortvedt and Josh Donaldson to the New York Yankees for Gary Sánchez and Gio Urshela. Serving as the Yankees' starting shortstop throughout the 2022 season, Kiner-Falefa finished the season batting .261/.314/.327 with four home runs and 48 RBIs in 142 games.

During the 2023 spring training, Kiner-Falefa competed with Anthony Volpe and Oswald Peraza for the Yankees' starting shortstop position. Volpe ultimately won the role, and Kiner-Falefa transitioned into a utility player. On April 13, he made his pitching debut in the ninth inning of an 11–2 loss against the Minnesota Twins. Notably, his second pitch, a 38.5 miles per hour (mph) eephus pitch, was the slowest pitch ever recorded in Yankees history during the Statcast era. This record was subsequently broken by Austin Slater, another position player who threw a 36.4 mph pitch during a relief appearance on September 10, 2025. On June 14, during the Subway Series against the New York Mets, Kiner-Falefa stole home off pitcher Brooks Raley, becoming the first Yankee to accomplish this feat since Didi Gregorius on August 27, 2016. On June 22, he made his third pitching appearance of the season in the ninth inning of a 10–0 loss to the Seattle Mariners, marking the first time a Yankees position player pitched three times in a single season. He pitched a scoreless inning and recorded his first career strikeout against Eugenio Suárez. Additionally, batting as a pitcher in the same game, he hit a two-run home run off reliever Chris Flexen, becoming the first Yankee to homer as a pitcher since Lindy McDaniel on September 28, 1972, the final season before the American League (AL) adopted the designated hitter rule. Kiner-Falefa finished the 2023 season batting .242/.306/.340 with six home runs and 37 RBIs in 113 games. Following the 2023 season, he became a free agent.

=== Toronto Blue Jays (2024) ===
On December 29, 2023, Kiner-Falefa signed a two-year, $15 million contract with the Toronto Blue Jays. He began the 2024 season with the Blue Jays, batting .292/.338/.420 with seven home runs and 33 RBI in 83 games.

=== Pittsburgh Pirates (2024–2025) ===
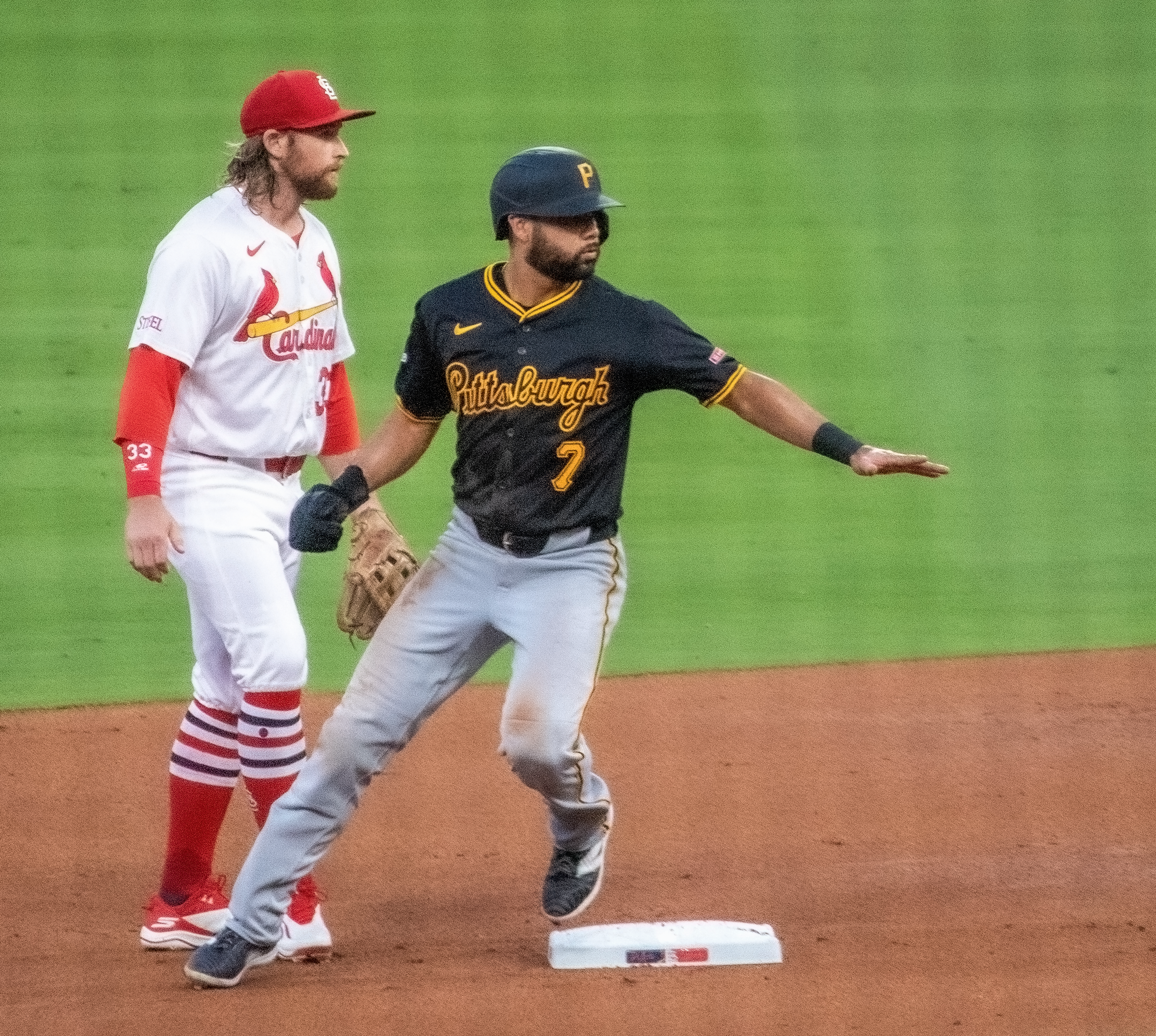
Kiner-Falefa with the Pittsburgh Pirates in 2024 at Busch Stadium next to Brendan Donovan of the St. Louis Cardinals

On July 30, 2024, the Toronto Blue Jays traded Kiner-Falefa to the Pittsburgh Pirates for Charles McAdoo. He played with the Pirates for the remainder of the 2024 season, batting .240/.265/.322 with one home run and 10 RBIs in 50 games.

Kiner-Falefa began the 2025 season with the Pirates, batting .264/.300/.332 with one home run and 35 RBIs in 119 games.

=== Toronto Blue Jays (2025) ===
On August 31, 2025, the Toronto Blue Jays claimed Kiner-Falefa off waivers from the Pittsburgh Pirates. He played with the Blue Jays for the remainder of the 2025 season, batting .233/.258/.367 with one home run and five RBIs in 19 games.

In Game 7 of the 2025 World Series, with the Toronto Blue Jays and Los Angeles Dodgers tied 4–4 in the bottom of the ninth inning, Kiner-Falefa entered the game as a pinch runner for Blue Jays second baseman Bo Bichette, who was limited by a knee injury. With one out and the bases loaded, Kiner-Falefa was on third base when Blue Jays batter Daulton Varsho hit a ground ball to Dodgers second baseman Miguel Rojas. Attempting to score the championship-winning run, Kiner-Falefa was out at home plate on a force play. Although coaching instructed him to hold a close lead at third base to avoid a possible double play on a line drive, Kiner-Falefa faced criticism on social media after the game for taking only a small primary lead, especially since Dodgers third baseman Max Muncy was positioned far from the base. He was also faulted for not taking a larger secondary lead while Dodgers pitcher Yoshinobu Yamamoto delivered the pitch. Additionally, Kiner-Falefa received criticism for sliding feet-first into home plate rather than running through it, a technique generally considered faster and more common on force plays similar to those at first base. Ultimately, the Dodgers won the game 5–4 in extra innings. Kiner-Falefa's decision was both criticized and supported.

Following the 2025 season, Kiner-Falefa became a free agent.

=== Boston Red Sox (2026) ===
On February 10, 2026, Kiner-Falefa signed a one-year, $6 million contract with the Boston Red Sox. On June 20, Kiner-Falefa was placed on the injured list due to left forearm inflammation. A subsequent CT scan revealed a stress reaction in his forearm. He was transferred to the 60–day injured list on August 11. Kiner-Falefa was activated on September 1, when rosters expanded.

== Personal life ==
Kiner-Falefa is of Samoan descent through his father and of Japanese and White American descent, with traces of Pennsylvania Dutch ancestry, through his mother. His maternal grandmother was from Hiroshima, Japan.

Kiner-Falefa is the middle of three siblings. He has an older half-brother, Jaris, and a younger sister, Leka, who played college volleyball for the North Texas Mean Green, UNLV Rebels, and Chaminade Silverswords.

Through his mother's lineage, Kiner-Falefa is the second cousin twice removed of Baseball Hall of Famer Ralph Kiner. Their shared ancestor, Mary McPherran Kiner of Mifflin County, Pennsylvania, was Kiner's great-grandmother and Kiner-Falefa's great-great-great-grandmother. Kiner-Falefa's maternal grandfather, John Kiner, attended the University of Hawaii and chose to remain in Hawaii rather than return to the mainland; he often shared stories with young Isiah about his second cousin Ralph.

Kiner-Falefa married Tayea Chun, a fellow Hawaii native, on December 21, 2024, in a wedding ceremony in Kapolei, Hawaii.
