= Ben Rortvedt =

American baseball player (born 1997)

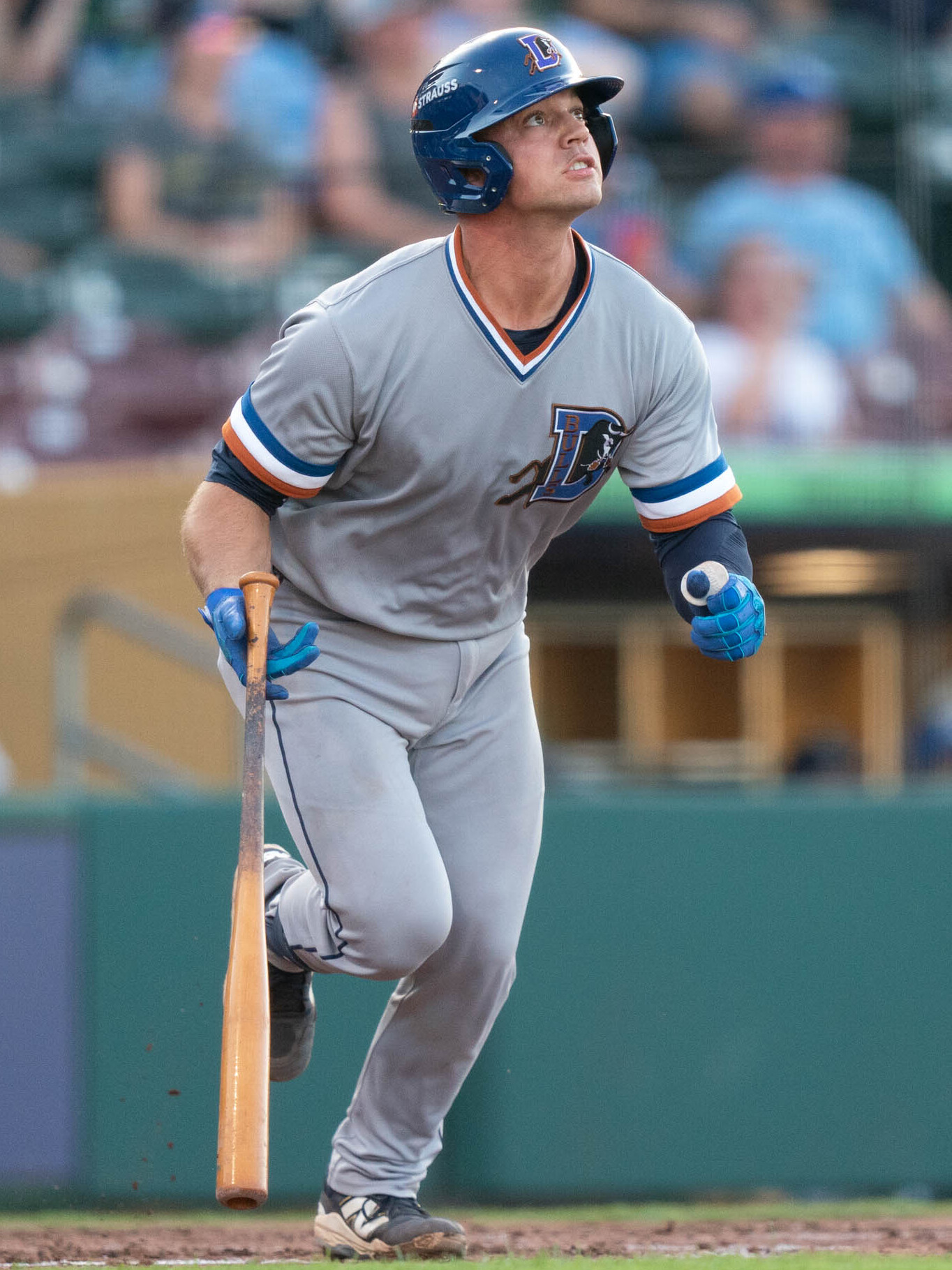
- Rortvedt with the Durham Bulls in 2025

Free agent
- Catcher
- Born: September 25, 1997 (age 29); Madison, Wisconsin, U.S.
- Bats: Left Throws: Right

MLB debut
- April 30, 2021, for the Minnesota Twins

MLB statistics (through August 30, 2026)
- Batting average: .189
- Home runs: 9
- Runs batted in: 53
- Stats at Baseball Reference

Teams
- Minnesota Twins (2021); New York Yankees (2023); Tampa Bay Rays (2024–2025); Los Angeles Dodgers (2025–2026)

Career highlights and awards
- World Series champion (2025)

Benjamin Thomas Rortvedt (born September 25, 1997) is an American professional baseball catcher who is a free agent. He has previously played in Major League Baseball (MLB) for the Minnesota Twins, New York Yankees, Tampa Bay Rays, and Los Angeles Dodgers. He made his MLB debut in 2021 with the Twins.

== Amateur career ==
Rortvedt attended Verona Area High School in Verona, Wisconsin. As a senior, he slashed .444/.568/.667. He committed to play college baseball at the University of Arkansas.

== Professional career ==
=== Minnesota Twins ===
The Minnesota Twins selected Rortvedt in the second round, with the 56th overall selection, of the 2016 Major League Baseball draft. He signed with the Twins for a $900,000 signing bonus, forgoing his commitment to Arkansas.

Rortvedt made his professional debut that same year with the Gulf Coast League Twins before being promoted to the Elizabethton Twins. In 33 games between the two clubs, he batted .222 with ten RBIs. He spent 2017 with the Cedar Rapids Kernels where he compiled a .224 batting average with four home runs and 30 RBIs in 89 games, and 2018 with both Cedar Rapids and the Fort Myers Miracle, slashing a combined .262/.331/.379 with five home runs and 43 RBIs in 90 total games between the two clubs. He returned to Fort Myers to begin the 2019 season, and was promoted to the Pensacola Blue Wahoos in May, with whom he finished the year. Over 79 games between the two teams, he hit .238/.334/.379 with seven home runs and 29 RBIs. Rortvedt did not play a minor league game in 2020 due to the cancellation of the minor league season caused by the COVID-19 pandemic. The Twins added him to their 40-man roster after the 2020 season.

On April 30, 2021, Rortvedt was promoted to the major leagues for the first time. He made his MLB debut that day as the starting catcher against the Kansas City Royals. In the game, he recorded his first major league hit, an RBI single off of Royals reliever Wade Davis. He had a total of 89 at-bats over 2021 with the Twins, batting .169/.229/.281 with three home runs and seven RBIs. When not with the Twins, he played with the St. Paul Saints with whom he slashed .254/.324/.426 with five home runs and 22 RBIs over 34 games.

=== New York Yankees ===
On March 13, 2022, the Twins traded Rortvedt, Josh Donaldson, and Isiah Kiner-Falefa to the New York Yankees in exchange for Gary Sánchez and Gio Urshela. An oblique injury that Rortvedt suffered before the trade limited his ability to play during spring training. He began the season on the injured list, and the Yankees acquired Jose Trevino. He was activated from the injured list and optioned to the Scranton/Wilkes-Barre RailRiders in late April. On May 18, Rortvedt underwent arthroscopic knee surgery on his left knee to repair a partially torn meniscus. The procedure came with a recovery timetable of six-to-eight weeks. He was placed on the 60-day injured list on May 22. The Yankees promoted him to the major leagues on September 9 when Trevino went on the paternity list, but was optioned back without playing in a game on September 12.

During spring training in 2023, Rortvedt had an aneurysm in an artery near his right shoulder, requiring a surgical procedure. The Yankees promoted Rortvedt to the major leagues on May 18 when Trevino went on the injured list. Rortvedt was again promoted on July 21, after Trevino went on the injured list to receive season-ending wrist surgery. He batted .118 in 32 games for the Yankees.

=== Tampa Bay Rays ===
On March 27, 2024, the Yankees traded Rortvedt to the Tampa Bay Rays in a three-team trade in which the Miami Marlins traded Jon Berti to the Yankees and the Marlins received John Cruz and Shane Sasaki. In 112 appearances for the Rays in 2024, Rortvedt batted .228/.317/.303 with three home runs and a career-high 31 RBI.

Rortvedt played in 26 contests for Tampa Bay in 2025, going 6-for-63 (.095) with six RBI and seven walks. On May 28, 2025, Rortvedt was designated for assignment by the Rays. He cleared waivers and was sent outright to the Triple-A Durham Bulls on June 2.

=== Los Angeles Dodgers ===
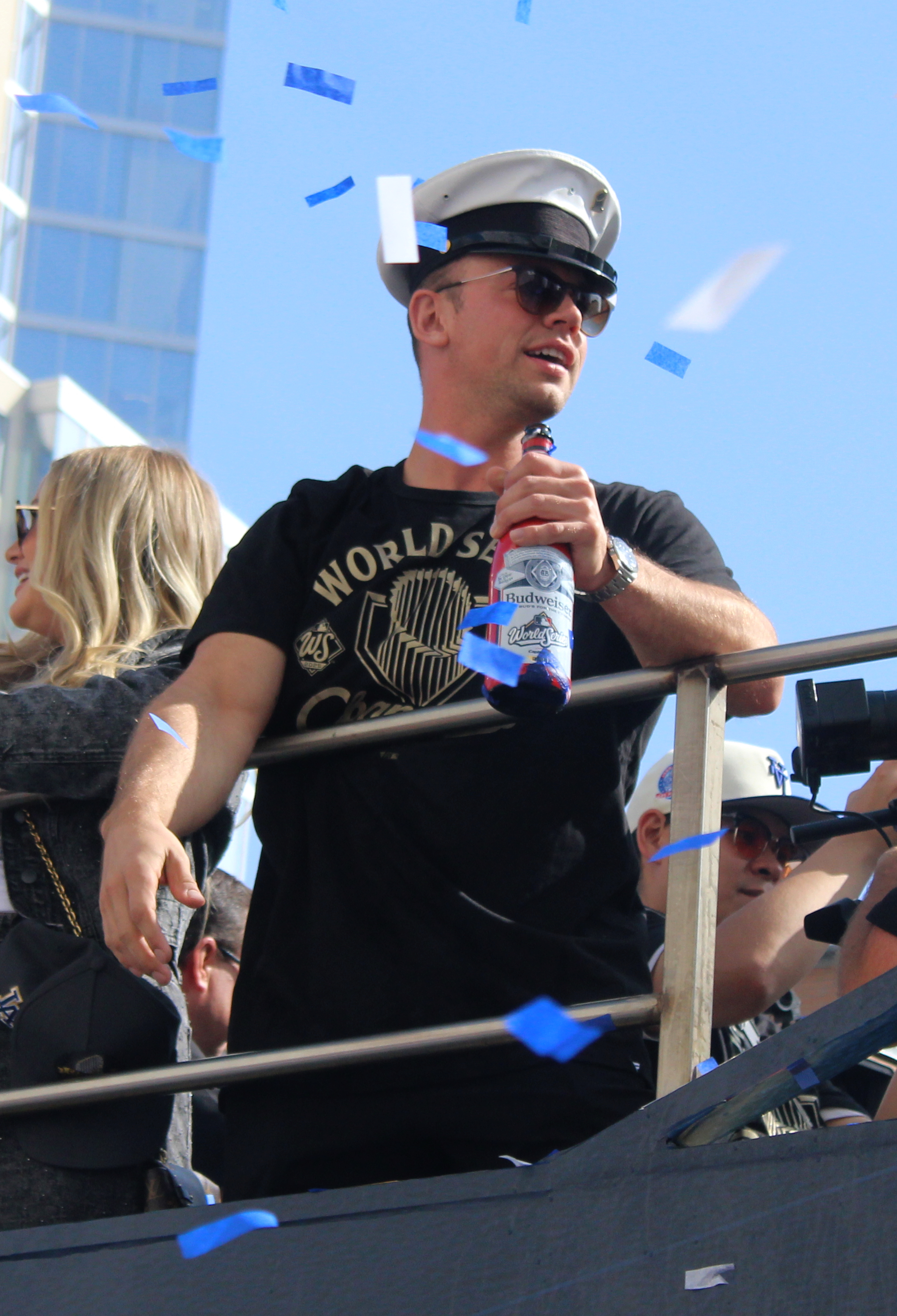
Rortvedt in 2025

On July 31, 2025, the Rays traded Rortvedt, Paul Gervase, and Adam Serwinowski to the Los Angeles Dodgers in exchange for Hunter Feduccia. After beginning with the Triple-A Oklahoma City Comets, Rortvedt was added to the Dodgers' active roster on September 4. As a result of injuries to the Dodgers two catchers (Will Smith and Dalton Rushing), he became the Dodgers starting catcher for most of September and batted .224 in 18 games for the Dodgers, with one home run and four RBIs.

Smith was still hampered by injuries heading into the postseason, so Rortvedt was the Dodgers starting catcher for the Wild Card Series and the first half of the 2025 NLDS, before Smith eventually resumed his starting role. Rortvedt had seven at-bats between the two series, with three hits (including a double), one RBI and two sacrifice bunts.

On November 12, 2025, Rortvedt was claimed off waivers by the Cincinnati Reds. He was designated for assignment following the signing of Eugenio Suárez on February 3, 2026 and on February 6, returned to the Dodgers on another waiver claim. On February 11, the Dodgers again designated him for assignment.

=== New York Mets ===
On February 15, 2026, Rortvedt was claimed off waivers by the New York Mets. On March 25, Rortvedt was designated for assignment by the Mets. He cleared waivers and was sent outright to the Triple-A Syracuse Mets on March 27. Rortvedt made 48 appearances for Syracuse, batting .234/.319/.414 with six home runs, 26 RBI, and two stolen bases.

=== Los Angeles Dodgers (second stint) ===
On August 3, 2026, Rortvedt was traded back to the Dodgers in exchange for Chayce McDermott. With both Will Smith and Dalton Rushing injured, his contract was selected the following day. He was designated for assignment on September 1, when Smith and Rushing returned to the major league club. Rortvedt played in 16 games for the Dodgers, with five hits in 27 at-bats (.185). On September 3, he cleared waivers and was assigned to Oklahoma City, where he played in six games and recorded six hits in 22 at-bats. Rortvedt elected free agency on October 17.
