= Robby Ahlstrom =

American baseball player (born 1999)

Texas Rangers – No. 54
- Pitcher
- Born: June 18, 1999 (age 27); Placerville, California, U.S.
- Bats: Left Throws: Left

MLB debut
- June 3, 2026, for the Texas Rangers

MLB statistics (through 2026 season)
- Win–loss record: 3–1
- Earned run average: 6.08
- Strikeouts: 34
- Stats at Baseball Reference

Teams
- Texas Rangers (2026–present)

Robert Coolidge Ahlstrom (born June 18, 1999) is an American professional baseball pitcher for the Texas Rangers of Major League Baseball (MLB). He made his MLB debut in 2026.

== Amateur career ==
Ahlstrom attended North Eugene High School in Eugene, Oregon. Undrafted out of high school, he attended Chemeketa Community College. During his freshman season of 2018, he went 4–3 with a 2.55 ERA and 84 strikeouts, while hitting .302 as a utility player. He then transferred to The University of Oregon to play college baseball for the Ducks. Ahlstrom played three seasons (2019–2021) for Oregon. His best season was as a senior when he went 9–3 with a 2.50 ERA and 92 strikeouts over 90 innings. In 2019, he played collegiate summer baseball with the Falmouth Commodores of the Cape Cod Baseball League.

== Professional career ==
Ahlstrom was drafted by the New York Yankees in the seventh round (213th overall) of the 2021 Major League Baseball draft and signed with them. He did not play professionally in 2021 after signing.

On April 2, 2022, Ahlstrom and Albert Abreu were traded to the Texas Rangers in exchange for Jose Trevino. He split the 2022 season between the Down East Wood Ducks of the Low-A Carolina League and the Hickory Crawdads of the High-A South Atlantic League, going a combined 2–10 with a 5.04 ERA and 106 strikeouts over 89 1/3 innings. He split the 2023 season between Hickory and the Frisco RoughRiders of the Double-A Texas League, going a combined 3–1 with a 3.86 ERA and 79 strikeouts over 58 1/3 innings. Following that season, he played in the Puerto Rican Winter League for the Cangrejeros de Santurce, going 2–0 with a 0.64 ERA and 16 strikeouts over 14 innings. Ahlstrom split the 2024 season between Frisco and the Round Rock Express of the Triple-A Pacific Coast League, going a combined 6–1 with a 2.53 ERA and 72 strikeouts over 64 innings. He split the 2025 season between Frisco and Round Rock, going a combined 2–4 with a 3.28 ERA and 62 strikeouts over 60 1/3 innings. Ahlstrom returned to Round Rock to open the 2026 season.

On June 1, 2026, Ahlstrom was selected to the 40-man roster and promoted to the major leagues for the first time. On June 11, Ahlstrom recorded his first career win, tossing 1 1/3 scoreless innings of relief against the Kansas City Royals.
