= Albert Abreu =

Dominican baseball player (born 1995)

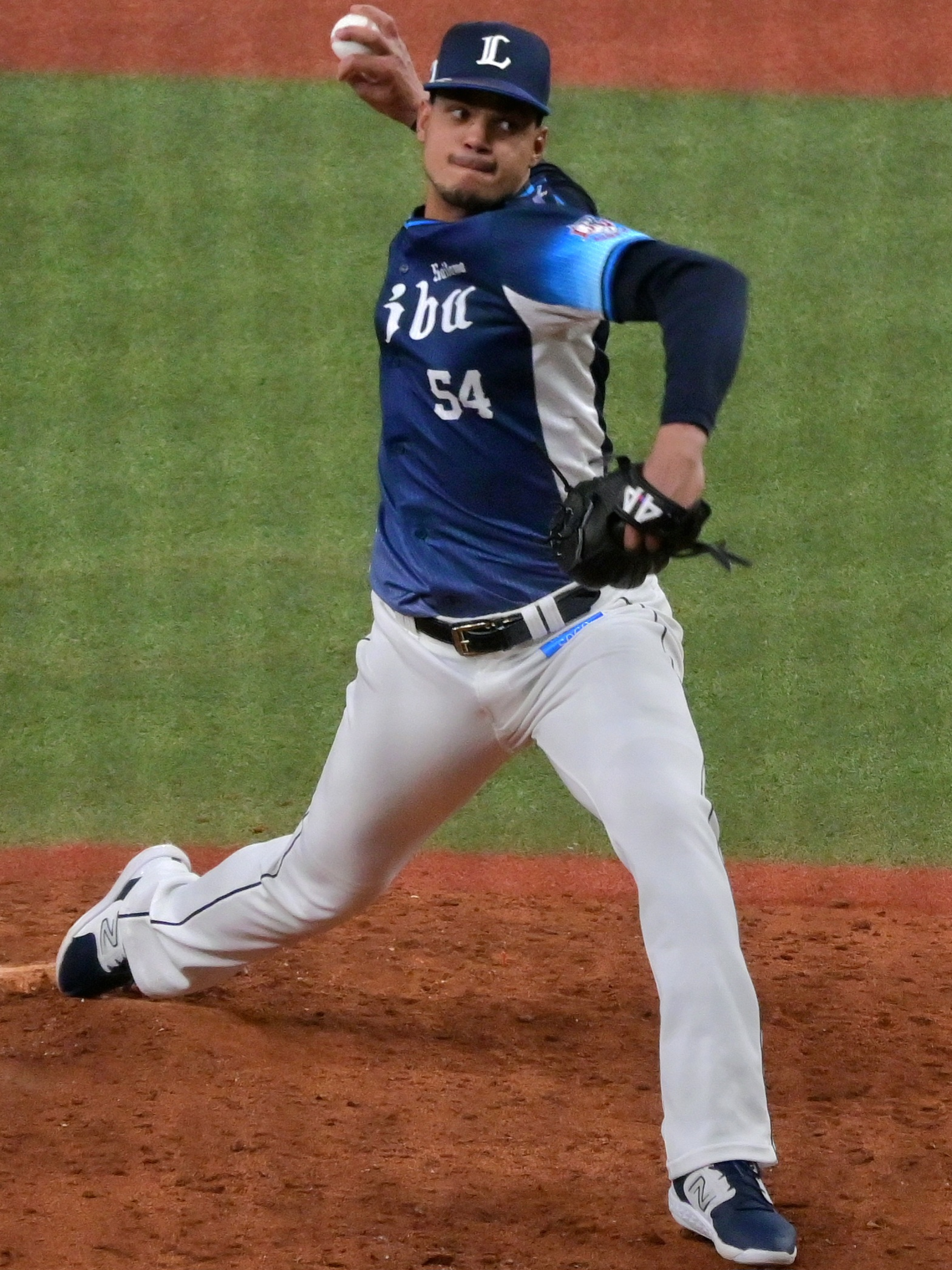
- Abreu with the Saitama Seibu Lions in 2024

Free agent
- Pitcher
- Born: September 26, 1995 (age 31); Guayubín, Dominican Republic
- Bats: Right Throws: Right

Professional debut
- MLB: August 8, 2020, for the New York Yankees
- NPB: March 30, 2024, for the Saitama Seibu Lions

MLB statistics (through 2023 season)
- Win–loss record: 6–5
- Earned run average: 4.58
- Strikeouts: 136

NPB statistics (through 2026 season)
- Win–loss record: 3–6
- Earned run average: 2.96
- Strikeouts: 65
- Saves: 28
- Stats at Baseball Reference

Teams
- New York Yankees (2020–2021); Texas Rangers (2022); Kansas City Royals (2022); New York Yankees (2022–2023); Saitama Seibu Lions (2024); Chunichi Dragons (2026)
Medals
Men's baseball
Representing Dominican Republic
World Baseball Classic
Bronze medal – third place	2026 Miami	Team

Albert Emmanuel Abreu Díaz (born September 26, 1995) is a Dominican professional baseball pitcher who is a free agent. He has previously played in Major League Baseball (MLB) for the New York Yankees, Texas Rangers, and Kansas City Royals, and in Nippon Professional Baseball (NPB) for the Saitama Seibu Lions and Chunichi Dragons.

== Career ==
=== Houston Astros ===
Abreu signed with the Houston Astros as an international free agent on March 1, 2014. He made his professional debut with the Dominican Summer League Astros where he had a 3–2 win–loss record with a 2.78 earned run average (ERA) in 14 games. He pitched 2015 with the Greeneville Astros, going 2–3 with a 2.51 ERA. Abreu started 2016 with the Quad Cities River Bandits, where he posted a 2–8 record and 3.50 ERA before being promoted to the Lancaster JetHawks where he finished the season, going 1–0 with a 5.40 ERA in three games.

=== New York Yankees ===
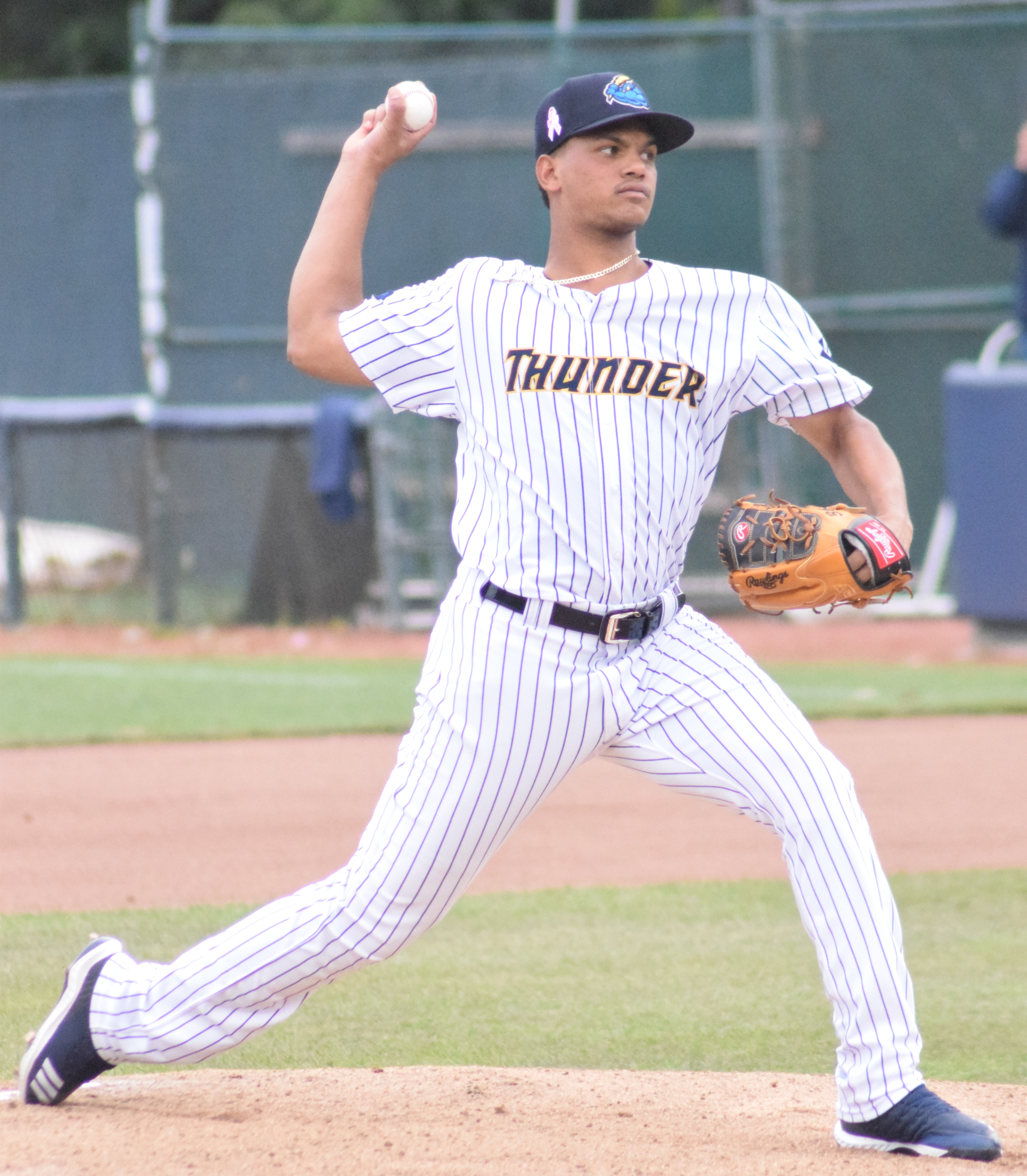
Abreu with the Trenton Thunder in 2019

On November 17, 2016, the Astros traded Abreu and Jorge Guzmán to the New York Yankees in exchange for Brian McCann. He spent 2017 with the Single-A Charleston RiverDogs, High-A Tampa Yankees, and rookie-level Gulf Coast League Yankees, posting a combined 2–3 record and 3.38 ERA with 61 strikeouts in 53 1/3 innings pitched between the three affiliates. On November 20, 2017, the Yankees added Abreu to their 40-man roster to protect him from the Rule 5 draft.

Abreu split 2018 between the Double-A Trenton Thunder, Tampa, and the GCL Yankees. In 17 starts split between the three affiliates, he accumulated a 4-6 record and 5.20 ERA with 74 strikeouts across 72 2/3 innings pitched. Abreu returned to Trenton for the 2019 season, registering a 5-8 record and 4.28 ERA with 91 strikeouts over 96 2/3 innings of work.

On August 8, 2020, Abreu was promoted to the major leagues for the first time. He made his MLB debut the same day.

=== Texas Rangers ===
On April 2, 2022, the Yankees traded Abreu and Robby Ahlstrom to the Texas Rangers in exchange for catcher Jose Trevino. In 7 appearances for Texas, he recorded a 3.12 ERA with 9 strikeouts across 8 2/3 innings pitched. On May 30, Abreu was designated for assignment by the Rangers following the promotion of Josh Smith.

=== Kansas City Royals ===
On June 2, 2022, the Rangers traded Abreu to the Kansas City Royals in exchange for Yohanse Morel. He made 4 appearances for the Royals, compiling a 4.15 ERA with 3 strikeouts across 4 1/3 innings of work. On June 17, Abreu was designated for assignment by Kansas City.

=== New York Yankees (second stint) ===
The New York Yankees claimed Abreu off of waivers on June 21, 2022. In 22 games down the stretch, he posted a 2–2 record and 3.16 ERA with 26 strikeouts across 25 2/3 innings of work.

Abreu made 45 appearances out of the bullpen for New York in 2023, registering a 2–2 record and 4.73 ERA with 61 strikeouts over 59 innings pitched. On November 17, 2023, the Yankees non–tendered Abreu, making him a free agent.

=== Saitama Seibu Lions ===
On December 6, 2023, Abreu signed with the Saitama Seibu Lions of Nippon Professional Baseball. He made 52 appearances for Seibu in 2024, compiling a 2–5 record and 2.39 ERA with 33 strikeouts and 28 saves over 49 innings pitched. On December 2, 2024, Abreu became a free agent.

=== Cincinnati Reds ===
On January 30, 2025, Abreu signed a minor league contract with the Cincinnati Reds. In 17 appearances for the Triple-A Louisville Bats, he recorded a 5.79 ERA with 18 strikeouts and one save across 23 1/3 innings pitched. Abreu was released by the Reds organization on June 16.

=== Chunichi Dragons ===
On December 9, 2025, Abreu signed with the Chunichi Dragons of Nippon Professional Baseball.

On November 1, 2026, the Dragons announced they would not be bringing Abreu back for the 2027 season.
