= Desi Druschel =

American baseball coach (born 1975)

New York Yankees – No. 83
- Coach
- Born: June 19, 1975 (age 50); Vinton, Iowa, U.S.

Teams
- As coach: New York Yankees (2022–2024); New York Mets (2025); New York Yankees (2026–present)

Desi Druschel (born June 19, 1975) is an American professional baseball coach who currently serves as the assistant pitching coach for the New York Yankees of Major League Baseball (MLB).

== Playing career ==
Druschel graduated from Vinton-Shellsburg High School in Vinton, Iowa. He attended Upper Iowa University and Mount Mercy University, playing baseball and basketball. He graduated from Mount Mercy in 1998 with a bachelor's degree in management. He enrolled at Indiana University Bloomington and a master's degree in athletic administration in 2001.

== Coaching career ==
=== College ===
Druschel began his coaching career as an assistant at Vinton-Shellsburg in 1996, and continued there through 2000. He was also an assistant coach for Indiana University from 1999 to 2000 and Mount St. Clare College from 2000 to 2001. He was the head coach for The Franciscan University from 2001 to 2004. He coached for Mount Mercy University for nine years, before he was hired as director of operations for the University of Iowa's baseball program in 2014. In 2017, he served as the pitching coach for the Iowa Hawkeyes.

=== New York Yankees ===
The New York Yankees hired Druschel in 2019. They promoted him to their major league staff as a pitching coach after the 2021 season.

=== New York Mets ===
On November 11, 2024, Druschel was hired by the New York Mets to serve as the team's assistant pitching coach, working under Jeremy Hefner.

=== New York Yankees (second stint) ===
On October 26, 2025, the Druschel was hired by the New York Yankees to serve as the team's assistant pitching coach, working under Matt Blake.

== Personal life ==
Druschel and his wife, Jessica, have two children.
