= Casey Dykes =

American baseball coach (born 1990)

New York Yankees – No. 87
- Coach
- Born: 1990 (age 35–36)

Teams
- As Coach: New York Yankees (2022–present)

Casey Dykes (born 1990) is an American professional baseball hitting coach for the New York Yankees of Major League Baseball.

== Career ==
Dykes graduated from Franklin High School in Franklin, Tennessee, in 2008. He played baseball and football in high school. Dykes attended Western Kentucky University and played college baseball for the Western Kentucky Hilltoppers. He earned a bachelor's degree in sports management in 2012. He stayed at Western Kentucky as a graduate assistant in 2013 and worked as a volunteer assistant for Bowling Green State University in 2014. Virginia Military Institute hired Dykes as a full-time assistant coach in 2015. He then served as an assistant coach for Indiana University Bloomington.

The New York Yankees hired Dykes as a minor league hitting coach in September 2019. In 2021, he was the hitting coach for the Scranton/Wilkes-Barre RailRiders. The Yankees promoted Dykes to the major league coaching staff after the 2021 season.

== Personal life ==
Dykes' wife, Chaney, played college basketball for the Western Kentucky Hilltoppers. They have three children.
