= Wandy Peralta =

Dominican baseball player (born 1991)

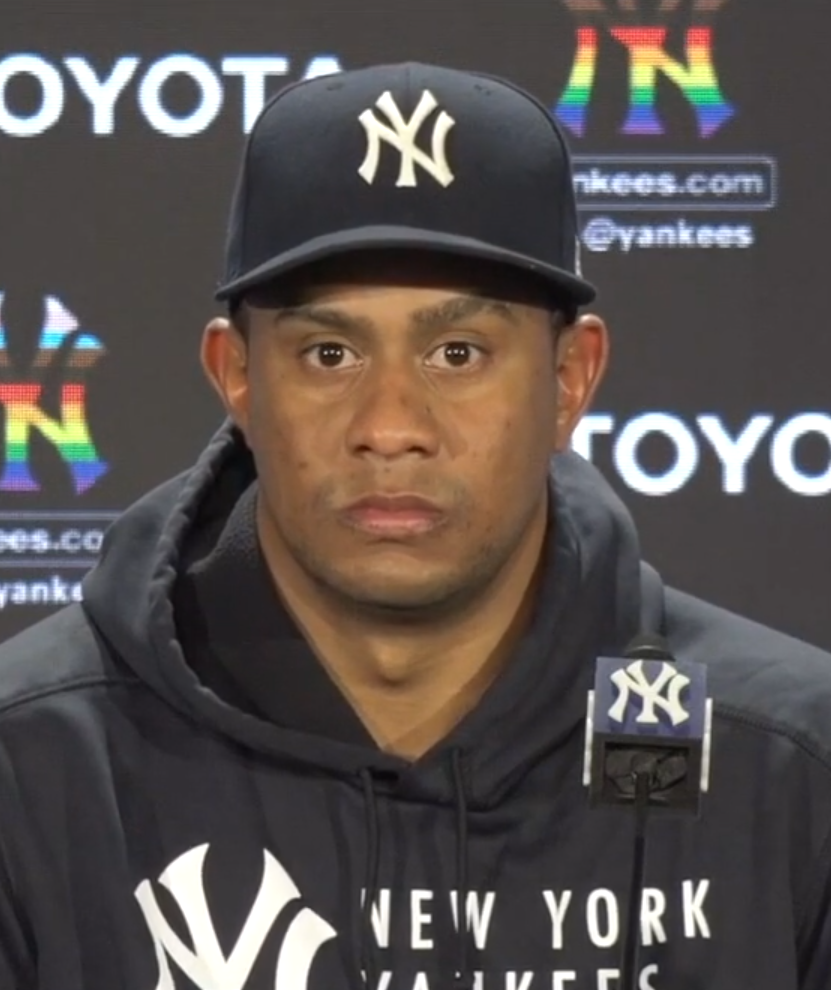
- Peralta with the New York Yankees in 2021

San Diego Padres – No. 58
- Pitcher
- Born: July 27, 1991 (age 35); San Francisco de Macorís, Duarte, Dominican Republic
- Bats: Left Throws: Left

MLB debut
- September 4, 2016, for the Cincinnati Reds

MLB statistics (through 2026 season)
- Win–loss record: 31–24
- Earned run average: 3.75
- Strikeouts: 426
- Stats at Baseball Reference

Teams
- Cincinnati Reds (2016–2019); San Francisco Giants (2019–2021); New York Yankees (2021–2023); San Diego Padres (2024–present)
Medals
Men's baseball
Representing Dominican Republic
World Baseball Classic
Bronze medal – third place	2026 Miami	Team

Wandy Luis Peralta Dominguez (born July 27, 1991) is a Dominican professional baseball pitcher for the San Diego Padres of Major League Baseball (MLB). He has previously played in MLB for the Cincinnati Reds, San Francisco Giants, and New York Yankees. Peralta signed with the Reds as an amateur free agent in 2010 and made his MLB debut in 2016.

== Career ==
=== Cincinnati Reds ===
Peralta signed with the Cincinnati Reds as an amateur free agent in May 2010. He was called up to the majors for the first time on September 2, 2016. He pitched to an 8.59 earned run average (ERA) in ten games.

Peralta made the Reds' 2017 Opening Day roster. He won his first major league game against the St. Louis Cardinals on April 30, 2017. In 69 games in 2017, he went 3–4 with a 3.76 ERA in 64 2/3 innings.

In 2018, Peralta struggled with control and inconsistency, going 2–2 for Cincinnati and walking and striking out 31 in 45 1/3 innings while accumulating a 5.36 ERA. Pitching 13 games for the AAA Louisville Bats, he was 1–0 with a 3.14 ERA in 14 1/3 innings. In 2019 for Cincinnati he was 1–1 with a 6.09 ERA in 39 games in which he pitched 34 innings. Pitching for Louisville he was 0–0 with a 3.27 ERA in 11 innings.

=== San Francisco Giants ===
On September 7, 2019, the San Francisco Giants claimed Peralta off waivers. With the Giants in 2019, he was 0–0 with a 3.18 ERA in eight relief appearances covering 5 2/3 innings. In 2020, he was 1–1 with a 3.29 ERA over 27 1/3 innings. Peralta earned his first career save in a 10th inning 3–2 victory over the San Diego Padres in April 2021.

=== New York Yankees ===
On April 27, 2021, the Giants traded Peralta and Connor Cannon to the New York Yankees in exchange for outfielder Mike Tauchman. He had a 2.95 ERA for the Yankees in 2021 and signed a $2.15 million contract for the 2022 season.

In 2022, Peralta was 3–4 with four saves and a 2.72 ERA. He pitched in all five games of the 2022 American League Division Series, becoming the first pitcher to do so. He became a free agent following the 2023 season.

=== San Diego Padres ===
On February 9, 2024, Peralta signed a four-year, $16.5 million contract with the San Diego Padres. He exercised a player option for the 2025 season on November 4, 2024.
