= Oswald Peraza =

Venezuelan baseball player (born 2000)

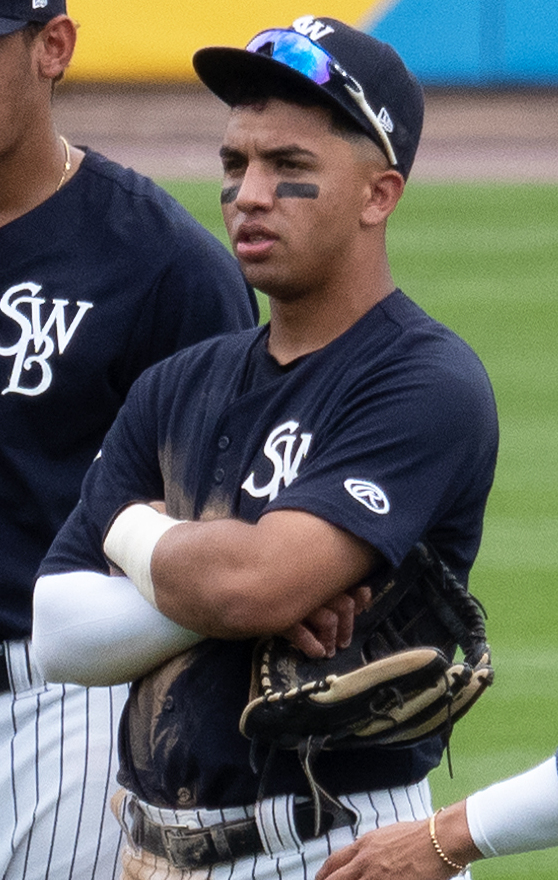
- Peraza with the Scranton/Wilkes-Barre RailRiders in 2022

Los Angeles Angels – No. 2
- Infielder
- Born: June 15, 2000 (age 26); Barquisimeto, Venezuela
- Bats: Right Throws: Right

MLB debut
- September 2, 2022, for the New York Yankees

MLB statistics (through 2026 season)
- Batting average: .204
- Home runs: 16
- Runs batted in: 62
- Stats at Baseball Reference

Teams
- New York Yankees (2022–2025); Los Angeles Angels (2025–present)

Oswald Dair Peraza (born June 15, 2000) is a Venezuelan professional baseball infielder for the Los Angeles Angels of Major League Baseball (MLB). He has previously played in MLB for the New York Yankees. Peraza signed with the Yankees as an international free agent in 2016, and made his MLB debut in 2022.

== Career ==
=== New York Yankees ===
Peraza signed with the New York Yankees as an international free agent on July 2, 2016. He made his professional debut in 2017 with the Dominican Summer League Yankees. Peraza was later promoted to the rookie-level Gulf Coast League Yankees that season.

Peraza played the 2018 season with the Pulaski Yankees and 2019 with the Staten Island Yankees and Charleston RiverDogs. He did not play a minor league game in 2020 due to season being cancelled because of the COVID-19 pandemic.

The Yankees added Peraza to their 40-man roster after the 2020 season to protect him from being exposed in the Rule 5 draft. He played the 2021 season with the Hudson Valley Renegades, Somerset Patriots, and Scranton/Wilkes-Barre RailRiders. Peraza returned to Scranton/Wilkes-Barre for the 2022 season, batting .259/.329/.448 in 386 at-bats.

The Yankees promoted Peraza to the major leagues for the first time on September 1, 2022. On October 4, Peraza hit his first career home run, a solo shot off of Texas Rangers starter Jon Gray. In 49 at bats he hit .306/.404/.429, while playing 12 games at shortstop and four games at second base.

Peraza was optioned to Triple-A Scranton/Wilkes-Barre to begin the 2023 season. The Yankees promoted Peraza to the major leagues on April 16 when Giancarlo Stanton went on the injured list. He began to start as a third baseman due to Josh Donaldson's injury, even though he had not played the position before. In 52 games for the Yankees, Peraza hit .191/.267/.272 with 2 home runs, 14 RBI, and 4 stolen bases.

On March 9, 2024, it was announced that Peraza would miss 6–8 weeks with a subscapularis strain in his right shoulder. He would appear in only four games for the team, going 2-for-10 (.200) with one home run and one RBI.

Peraza made 71 appearances for New York during the 2025 season, slashing .152/.212/.241 with three home runs, 13 RBI, and three stolen bases.

=== Los Angeles Angels ===
On July 31, 2025, the Yankees traded Peraza to the Los Angeles Angels in exchange for Wilberson De Pena and international bonus pool money. In 35 games with the Angels, Peraza hit .186 with two home runs, seven RBI, and six stolen bases.
