= Jose Trevino (baseball) =

American baseball player (born 1992)

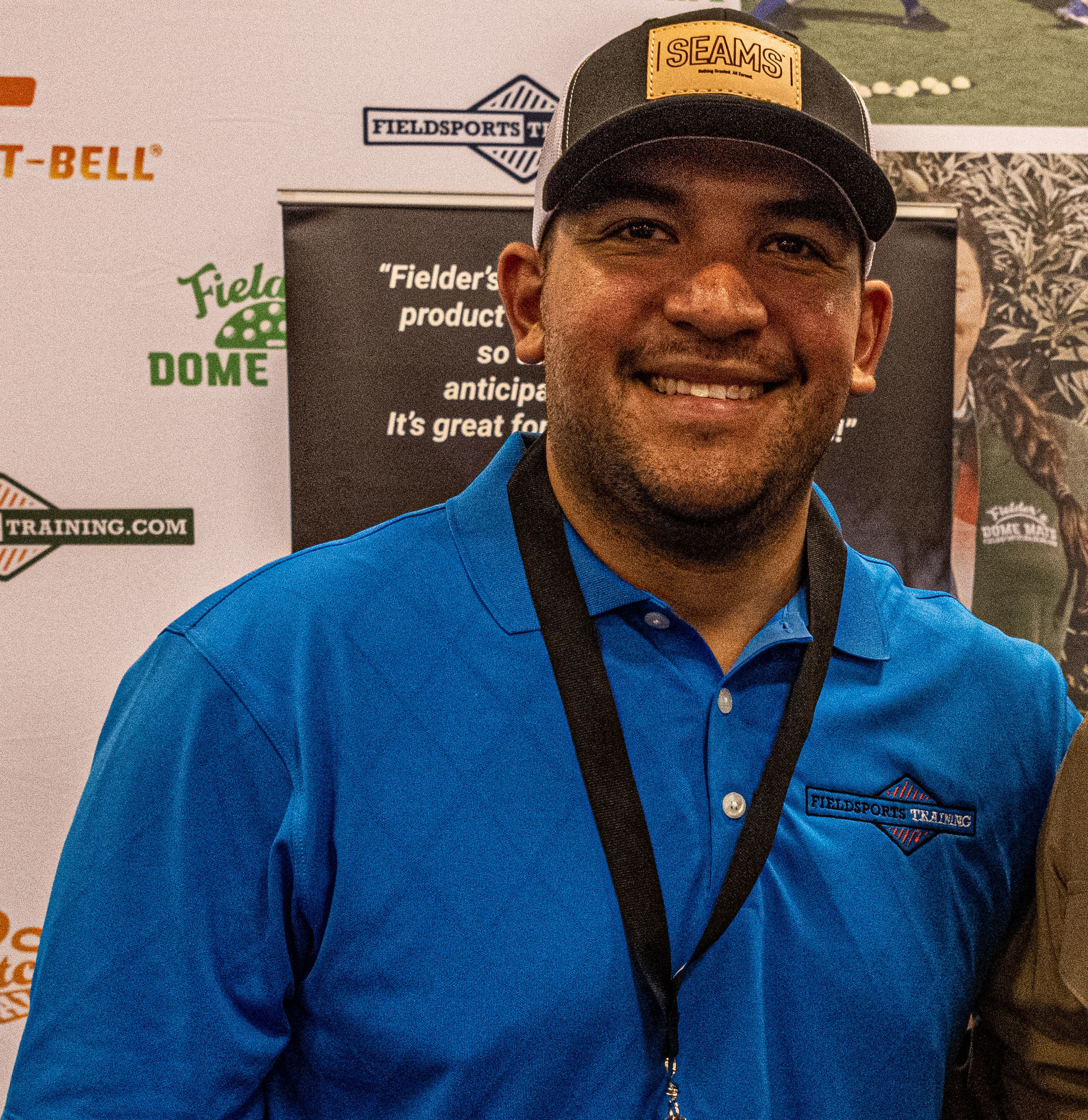
- Trevino in 2023

Cincinnati Reds – No. 35
- Catcher
- Born: November 28, 1992 (age 33); Corpus Christi, Texas, U.S.
- Bats: Right Throws: Right

MLB debut
- June 15, 2018, for the Texas Rangers

MLB statistics (through 2026 season)
- Batting average: .235
- Home runs: 41
- Runs batted in: 182
- Stats at Baseball Reference

Teams
- Texas Rangers (2018–2021); New York Yankees (2022–2024); Cincinnati Reds (2025–present)

Career highlights and awards
- All-Star (2022); Gold Glove Award (2022)
Medals
Men's baseball
Representing the United States
Haarlem Baseball Week
Bronze medal – third place	2012	Team

Jose Ramón Trevino (born November 28, 1992) is an American professional baseball catcher for the Cincinnati Reds of Major League Baseball (MLB). He has previously played in MLB for the Texas Rangers and New York Yankees.

The Rangers selected Trevino in the sixth round of the 2014 MLB draft out of Oral Roberts University. He made his MLB debut in 2018 with the Rangers, who traded him to the Yankees before the 2022 season. He was an All-Star in 2022, and won the Fielding Bible Award, Gold Glove Award, and Platinum Glove Award at the end of the season. After the 2024 season, the Yankees traded him to the Reds.

== Amateur career ==
Trevino attended St. John Paul II High School in Corpus Christi, Texas. Out of high school, he was not selected in the Major League Baseball draft. Trevino decided to attend Oral Roberts University and played college baseball for the Oral Roberts Golden Eagles. In 2012, he played collegiate summer baseball in the Northwoods League for the Madison Mallards playing in 22 games and hitting four home runs and five doubles. Trevino struck out only 12 times in 83 at-bats and totaled 17 hits. In 2013, he played collegiate summer baseball in the Cape Cod Baseball League for the Yarmouth–Dennis Red Sox.

== Professional career ==
=== Draft and minor leagues (2014–2017) ===
The Texas Rangers selected Trevino in the sixth round of the 2014 MLB draft. He made his professional debut with the Spokane Indians of the Low-A Northwest League, playing catcher, third base, and second base, while hitting .257/.313/.448/.761 with 9 home runs and 49 RBIs. Trevino played for the Hickory Crawdads of the Single-A South Atlantic League in 2015, hitting .262/.291/.415/.707 with 14 home runs along with 63 RBIs, while becoming a full-time catcher. After the season, he played in the Arizona Fall League. In 2016, he played for the High Desert Mavericks of the High-A California League and won a minor league Gold Glove Award. With High Desert, he hit .303/.342/.434/.776 with nine home runs and 68 RBIs. He played in the Arizona Fall League after the season for the second consecutive year.

Trevino spent 2017 with the Frisco RoughRiders of the Double-A Texas League, hitting .241/.275/.323/.598 with 7 home runs and 42 RBIs. The Rangers added Trevino to their 40-man roster after the 2017 season. Trevino was awarded the MiLB Rawlings Gold Glove Award for catchers, in both 2016 and 2017. He spent the 2018 minor league season with Frisco, hitting .234/.284/.332/.615 with three home runs and 16 RBIs.

=== Texas Rangers (2018–2021) ===
Trevino made his major league debut with the Rangers on June 15, 2018, in a game against the Colorado Rockies. On June 16, Trevino recorded his first major league hit, a RBI single. On June 17, Trevino delivered his first career walk-off hit, a 2-run single off of Wade Davis. Trevino underwent season-ending surgery on his left shoulder on July 20, 2018.

In 2019, Trevino split minor league time between the Triple-A Nashville Sounds and the AZL Rangers of the Rookie-level Arizona League, hitting for a combined .214/.253/.324/.577 with 3 home runs and 28 RBIs. Trevino suffered a quad injury and was placed on the injured list from May 19 to June 24. He was recalled to Texas on August 2. He finished the 2019 season with Texas hitting .258/.272/.383/.655 with 2 home runs and 13 RBIs over 40 games.

Trevino played in 24 games for the Rangers in the pandemic shortened season in 2020, slashing .250/.280/.434 with two home runs and nine RBIs in 76 at-bats. Over 89 games in 2021, Trevino hit .239/.267/.340/.607 with five home runs and 30 RBIs.

=== New York Yankees (2022–2024) ===
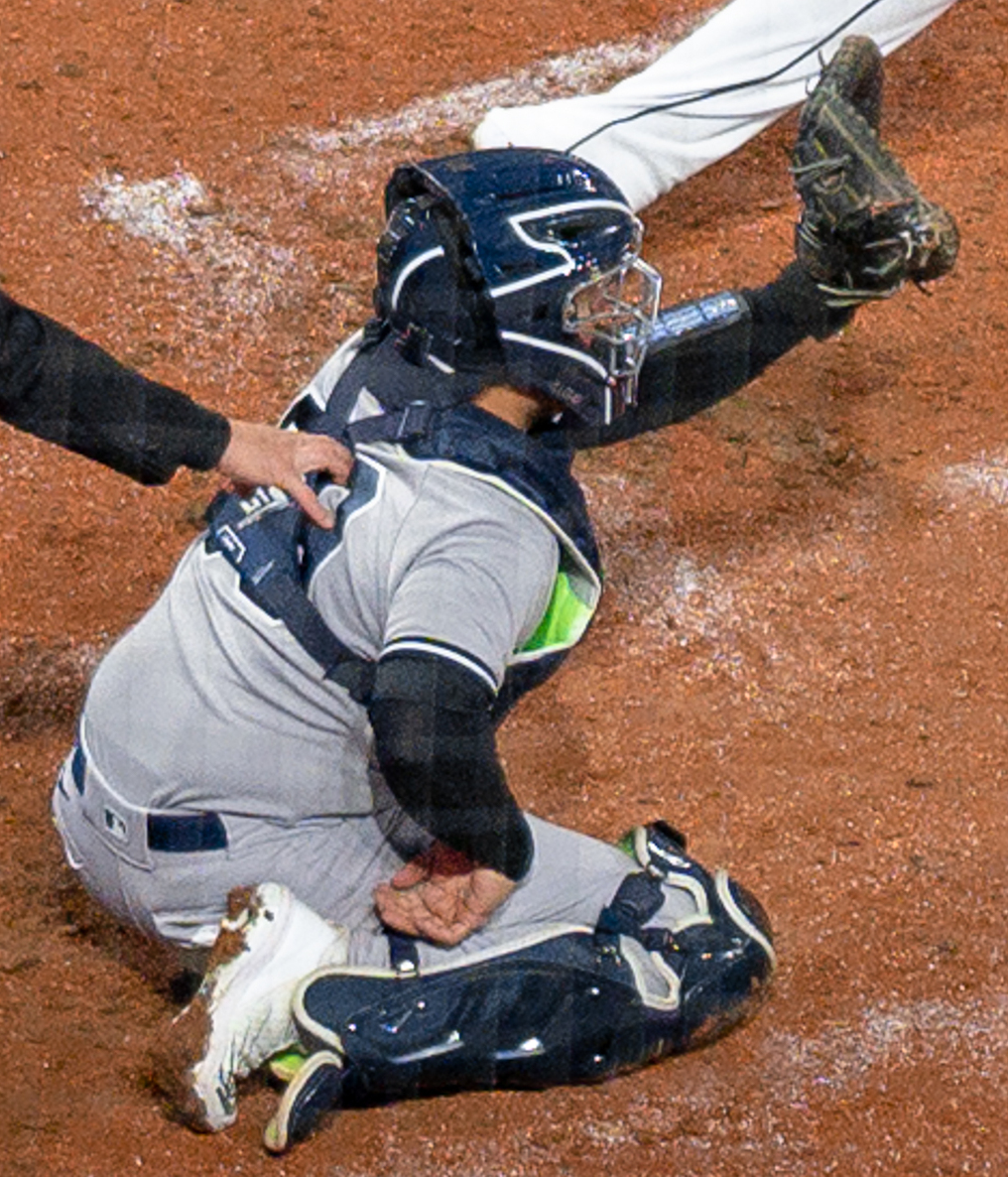
Trevino catching for the New York Yankees in 2022

On April 2, 2022, the Rangers traded Trevino to the New York Yankees in exchange for Albert Abreu and Robby Ahlstrom. He supplanted Kyle Higashioka as the Yankees starting catcher and was named an American League All-Star reserve.

In 2022, Trevino batted .248/.283/.388 with 11 home runs and 43 RBIs. He was one of the best defensive players of the season, winning a Fielding Bible Award, a Gold Glove Award, and being the first Yankee and the first American League catcher to win the Platinum Glove Award as the best defensive player in his league.

Eligible for salary arbitration, Trevino and the Yankees agreed to a $2.36 million salary for the 2023 season. In 55 games for the team in 2023, Trevino batted .210/.257/.312 with 4 home runs and 15 RBI. On July 21, it was announced that Trevino would undergo season-ending surgery to repair a ligament tear in his right wrist, which had bothered him since spring training.

Trevino and the Yankees agreed on a $2.73 million salary for the 2024 season. He played in 74 games for the Yankees in 2024, batting .215/.288/.354 with 8 home runs and 28 RBI.

=== Cincinnati Reds ===
On December 20, 2024, the Yankees traded Trevino to the Cincinnati Reds in exchange for Fernando Cruz and Alex Jackson. On March 20, 2025, Trevino agreed to a three-year contract extension worth $14.925 million with the Reds. On June 30, Trevino appeared as a pitcher in a game against the Boston Red Sox, and recorded his first career pitching strikeout against Marcelo Mayer. In 2025, he batted .238/.272/.351 with 4 home runs and 22 RBIs.

In 2026, he batted .217/.221/.336 with 5 home runs and 19 RBIs, and had the lowest walk percentage in the NL (0.6%), with one walk in 156 plate appearances.

== Personal life ==
Trevino's father, Joe "Bugé" Trevino, died during Jose's junior year at Oral Roberts. Trevino has one son who was born five days before he made his MLB debut.
