= 2024 New York Yankees season =

Season for the Major League Baseball team the New York Yankees

2024 New York Yankees
- American League champions American League East champions
- League: American League
- Division: East
- Ballpark: Yankee Stadium
- City: New York
- Record: 94–68 (.580)
- Divisional place: 1st
- Owners: Yankee Global Enterprises
- President: Randy Levine
- General managers: Brian Cashman
- Managers: Aaron Boone
- Television: YES Network; Amazon Prime Video (Michael Kay, Ryan Ruocco, John Flaherty, Paul O'Neill, Joe Girardi, David Cone, Jeff Nelson, Meredith Marakovits, Jack Curry, Justin Shackil, Bob Lorenz, Nancy Newman, Todd Frazier, Nick Swisher, David Yale)
- Radio: WFAN SportsRadio 66 AM / 101.9 FM; New York Yankees Radio Network (Justin Shackil, Emmanuel Berbari, Brendan Burke, Suzyn Waldman, John Sterling); WADO 1280 AM TUDN Radio; Cadena Radio Yankees (Francisco Rivera, Rickie Ricardo)

The 2024 New York Yankees season was the 122nd season for the New York Yankees franchise.

On September 7, the Yankees won their 82nd game of the season, thus extending their streak of winning seasons to 32 years (since 1993). On September 18, the Yankees clinched a postseason berth for the seventh time in the past eight seasons. On September 26, the Yankees clinched the American League East division with a win over the Baltimore Orioles. It was their third divisional title in the past six seasons, and their 21st divisional championship overall in franchise history. Additionally, it was their 59th postseason appearance, the most by a single team in Major League Baseball history. They defeated the Kansas City Royals in the American League Division Series to advance to the American League Championship Series (ALCS) for the fourth time in eight years. They beat the Cleveland Guardians in the ALCS in five games to capture their first AL pennant since 2009 and the 41st in franchise history. They faced the Los Angeles Dodgers in the 2024 World Series, losing in five games. This was the first Yankees–Dodgers World Series matchup since 1981 and the 12th in Major League Baseball history.

Aaron Judge won his first of two consecutive Most Valuable Player awards (third overall), posting personal highs in batting average, slugging percentage, and on-base-plus-slugging.

This was the final season for longtime play-by-play radio announcer John Sterling, who was honored by the team on April 20. It also marked the only season superstar outfielder Juan Soto spent with the organization, after an offseason trade from the Padres to the Yankees, as Soto departed the club for the New York Mets, the Yankees' crosstown rival.

== Offseason ==
The Yankees finished the 2023 season 82–80, good enough for fourth place in the AL East. They looked to improve on that record in 2024 under the guide of Aaron Boone, who entered his seventh year as manager of the Yankees.

=== Transactions ===
==== 2023 ====
- December 1 – claimed outfielder Oscar González off waivers from the Cleveland Guardians.
- December 5 – acquired outfielder Alex Verdugo from the Boston Red Sox in exchange for right-handed pitchers Greg Weissert and minor league prospects Richard Fitts and Nicholas Judice.
- December 7 – acquired outfielder Juan Soto from the San Diego Padres and signed him to a one-year, $31 million contract avoiding arbitration. The Yankees also acquired outfielder Trent Grisham in exchange for right-handed pitchers Michael King, Jhony Brito, Randy Vásquez, and Drew Thorpe, along with catcher Kyle Higashioka.
- December 11 – acquired left-handed pitcher Victor Gonzalez and infielder Jorbit Vivas from the Los Angeles Dodgers in exchange for infielder Trey Sweeney.
- December 14 – acquired cash considerations from the Pittsburgh Pirates in exchange for outfielder Billy McKinney.
- December 19 – claimed infielder Jeter Downs off waivers from the Washington Nationals.
- December 26 – acquired right-handed pitcher Cody Morris from the Cleveland Guardians in exchange for outfielder Estevan Florial.

==== 2024 ====
- January 4 – claimed outfielder Bubba Thompson off waivers from the Cincinnati Reds. The team also signed right-handed pitcher Cody Poteet to a one-year, $750,000 contract.
- January 11 – signed right-handed starting pitcher Marcus Stroman to a 2-year, $37 million contract. If he reaches 140 innings pitched in 2025, he gets a player option for 2026 worth $18 million.
- January 19 – signed right-handed starting pitcher Luke Weaver to a one-year, $2 million contract. The team also claimed infielder/outfielder Diego Castillo off waivers from the New York Mets.
- February 5 – acquired left-handed relief pitcher Caleb Ferguson from the Los Angeles Dodgers in exchange for left-handed pitcher Matt Gage and minor league pitcher Christian Zazueta.
- February 14 – claimed infielder Jordan Groshans off waivers from the Miami Marlins.
- February 28 – claimed infielder/outfielder Jahmai Jones off waivers from the Milwaukee Brewers.
- March 27 – acquired infielder Jon Berti from the Miami Marlins as part of a three-team trade in exchange for outfield prospects John Cruz and Shane Sasaki from the Tampa Bay Rays, who acquired catcher Ben Rortvedt from the Yankees.

== Regular season ==
=== Transactions ===
==== 2024 ====
- March 29 – acquired right-handed starting pitcher J.T. Brubaker and international signing bonus pool space from the Pittsburgh Pirates in exchange for a player to be named later.
- March 31 – acquired right-handed relief pitcher Jake Cousins from the Chicago White Sox in exchange for cash considerations.
- April 2 – traded left-handed relief pitcher Nick Ramirez to the Los Angeles Dodgers in exchange for cash considerations.
- April 18 – claimed outfielder Taylor Trammell off waivers from the Los Angeles Dodgers.
- June 20 – claimed left-handed relief pitcher Tim Hill off waivers from the Chicago White Sox
- June 23 – acquired third baseman J.D. Davis and cash considerations from the Oakland Athletics in exchange for infielder Jordan Groshans.
- July 10 – claimed left-handed relief pitcher Tim Mayza off waivers from the Toronto Blue Jays
- July 27 – acquired centerfielder/second baseman Jazz Chisholm Jr. from the Miami Marlins in exchange for minor league prospects Agustín Ramírez, Jared Serna and Abrahan Ramírez.
- July 30 – acquired right-handed relief pitcher Mark Leiter Jr. from Chicago Cubs in exchange for 22nd-ranked relief pitching prospect Jack Neely and infield 29th-ranked prospect Ben Cowles. The Yankees also traded relief pitcher Caleb Ferguson to the Houston Astros for a minor league prospect and international pool money. They also signed former outfielder-turned pitcher Brett Phillips from the Tampa Bay Rays to a minor league pitching contract in their farm system. They also acquired right-handed relief pitcher Enyel De Los Santos and minor league pitcher Thomas Balboni Jr. from the San Diego Padres in exchange for minor league outfielder Brandon Lockridge.

=== Season standings ===
==== American League East ====
AL East
Team	W	L	Pct.	GB	Home	Road
New York Yankees	94	68	.580	—	44‍–‍37	50‍–‍31
Baltimore Orioles	91	71	.562	3	44‍–‍37	47‍–‍34
Boston Red Sox	81	81	.500	13	38‍–‍43	43‍–‍38
Tampa Bay Rays	80	82	.494	14	42‍–‍39	38‍–‍43
Toronto Blue Jays	74	88	.457	20	39‍–‍42	35‍–‍46

==== American League Wild Card ====
Division leaders
Team	W	L	Pct.
New York Yankees	94	68	.580
Cleveland Guardians	92	69	.571
Houston Astros	88	73	.547

Wild Card teams (Top 3 teams qualify for postseason)
Team	W	L	Pct.	GB
Baltimore Orioles	91	71	.562	+5
Kansas City Royals	86	76	.531	—
Detroit Tigers	86	76	.531	—
Seattle Mariners	85	77	.525	1
Minnesota Twins	82	80	.506	4
Boston Red Sox	81	81	.500	5
Tampa Bay Rays	80	82	.494	6
Texas Rangers	78	84	.481	8
Toronto Blue Jays	74	88	.457	12
Oakland Athletics	69	93	.426	17
Los Angeles Angels	63	99	.389	23
Chicago White Sox	41	121	.253	45

==== Record vs. opponents ====
===== Record vs. American League =====
2024 American League record Source: MLB Standings Grid – 2024
Team	BAL	BOS	CWS	CLE	DET	HOU	KC	LAA	MIN	NYY	OAK	SEA	TB	TEX	TOR	NL
Baltimore	—	8–5	6–1	3–4	2–4	2–5	4–2	4–2	6–0	8–5	3–3	4–2	9–4	5–2	7–6	20–26
Boston	5–8	—	4–3	2–5	3–4	2–4	4–2	4–2	3–3	6–7	5–1	4–3	6–7	4–2	8–5	21–25
Chicago	1–6	3–4	—	5–8	3–10	2–4	1–12	4–2	1–12	1–5	3–3	1–6	4–2	0–7	1–5	11–35
Cleveland	4–3	5–2	8–5	—	7–6	1–4	5–8	5–1	10–3	2–4	6–1	4–2	3–4	4–2	4–2	24–22
Detroit	4–2	4–3	10–3	6–7	—	2–4	6–7	3–4	6–7	2–4	3–3	5–1	5–1	3–4	5–2	22–24
Houston	5–2	4–2	4–2	4–1	4–2	—	4–3	9–4	2–4	1–6	8–5	5–8	4–2	7–6	5–2	22–24
Kansas City	2–4	2–4	12–1	8–5	7–6	3–4	—	5–2	6–7	2–5	4–2	3–3	3–3	1–5	5–2	23–23
Los Angeles	2–4	2–4	2–4	1–5	4–3	4–9	2–5	—	1–5	3–3	5–8	8–5	3–4	4–9	0–7	22–24
Minnesota	0–6	3–3	12–1	3–10	7–6	4–2	7–6	5–1	—	0–6	6–1	5–2	3–4	5–2	4–2	18–28
New York	5–8	7–6	5–1	4–2	4–2	6–1	5–2	3–3	6–0	—	5–2	4–3	7–6	3–3	7–6	23–23
Oakland	3–3	1–5	3–3	1–6	3–3	5–8	2–4	8–5	1–6	2–5	—	4–9	3–4	6–7	3–3	24–22
Seattle	2–4	3–4	6–1	2–4	1–5	8–5	3–3	5–8	2–5	3–4	9–4	—	3–3	10–3	2–4	26–20
Tampa Bay	4–9	7–6	2–4	4–3	1–5	2–4	3–3	4–3	4–3	6–7	4–3	3–3	—	1–5	9–4	26–20
Texas	2–5	2–4	7–0	2–4	4–3	6–7	5–1	9–4	2–5	3–3	7–6	3–10	5–1	—	2–4	19–27
Toronto	6–7	5–8	5–1	2–4	2–5	2–5	2–5	7–0	2–4	6–7	3–3	4–2	4–9	4–2	—	20–26

Updated with the results of all games through September 30, 2024.

===== Record vs. National League =====
2024 American League record vs. National League Source: MLB Standings
Team	AZ	ATL	CHC	CIN	COL	LAD	MIA	MIL	NYM	PHI	PIT	SD	SF	STL	WSH
Baltimore	2–1	2–1	0–3	3–0	2–1	1–2	1–2	1–2	1–2	2–1	1–2	1–2	1–2	0–3	2–2
Boston	0–3	1–3	2–1	2–1	1–2	0–3	3–0	1–2	0–3	2–1	3–0	1–2	2–1	1–2	2–1
Chicago	1–2	2–1	0–4	0–3	2–1	0–3	1–2	0–3	0–3	0–3	0–3	0–3	1–2	2–1	2–1
Cleveland	0–3	1–2	3–0	3–1	1–2	1–2	2–1	0–3	3–0	2–1	2–1	1–2	2–1	1–2	2–1
Detroit	2–1	0–3	1–2	3–0	2–1	2–1	1–2	1–2	2–1	1–2	2–2	1–2	1–2	2–1	1–2
Houston	2–1	0–3	0–3	0–3	4–0	2–1	3–0	2–1	2–1	1–2	1–2	1–2	1–2	2–1	1–2
Kansas City	1–2	1–2	1–2	3–0	1–2	1–2	2–1	2–1	1–2	1–2	2–1	1–2	0–3	3–1	3–0
Los Angeles	1–2	1–2	1–2	0–3	1–2	2–2	3–0	1–2	2–1	1–2	2–1	3–0	2–1	1–2	1–2
Minnesota	2–1	0–3	1–2	1–2	2–1	1–2	1–2	1–3	1–2	2–1	1–2	1–2	1–2	1–2	2–1
New York	2–1	1–2	2–1	0–3	2–1	1–2	2–1	2–1	0–4	3–0	1–2	2–1	3–0	1–2	1–2
Oakland	1–2	1–2	2–1	2–1	2–1	1–2	2–1	1–2	2–1	2–1	3–0	0–3	2–2	1–2	2–1
Seattle	2–1	2–1	1–2	3–0	2–1	0–3	1–2	1–2	3–0	2–1	1–2	3–1	2–1	2–1	1–2
Tampa Bay	3–0	1–2	2–1	2–1	2–1	1–2	3–1	1–2	3–0	0–3	2–1	1–2	2–1	1–2	2–1
Texas	2–2	1–2	2–1	2–1	0–3	2–1	2–1	0–3	1–2	0–3	2–1	1–2	1–2	1–2	2–1
Toronto	1–2	1–2	1–2	1–2	2–1	1–2	0–3	1–2	1–2	1–3	2–1	2–1	2–1	3–0	1–2

Updated with the results of all games through September 30, 2024.

=== Game log ===
Legend
	Yankees win
	Yankees loss
	Postponement
	Clinched playoff spot
	Clinched division
**Bold**	Yankees team member

2024 Game Log: 94–68 (Home: 44–37; Away: 50–31)
March/April: 19–12 (Home: 8–5; Away: 11–7)

#	Date	Opponent	Score	Win	Loss	Save	Stadium	Attendance	Record
1	March 28	@ Astros	5–4	**Loáisiga** (1–0)	Pressly (0–1)	**Holmes** (1)	Minute Maid Park	42,642	1–0
2	March 29	@ Astros	7–1	**Weaver** (1–0)	Scott (0–1)	—	Minute Maid Park	41,583	2–0
3	March 30	@ Astros	5–3	**Stroman** (1–0)	Abreu (0–1)	**Holmes** (2)	Minute Maid Park	41,247	3–0
4	March 31	@ Astros	4–3	**Burdi** (1–0)	Hader (0–1)	**Holmes** (3)	Minute Maid Park	36,908	4–0
5	April 1	@ Diamondbacks	5–2	**Weaver** (2–0)	Nelson (0–1)	**González** (1)	Chase Field	38,608	5–0
6	April 2	@ Diamondbacks	0–7	Gallen (2–0)	**Cortés Jr.** (0–1)	—	Chase Field	39,863	5–1
7	April 3	@ Diamondbacks	6–5 (11)	**Holmes** (1–0)	McGough (0–1)	**Ferguson** (1)	Chase Field	35,038	6–1
8	April 5	Blue Jays	0–3	García (1–0)	**Ferguson** (0–1)	Green (1)	**Yankee Stadium**	47,812	6–2
9	April 6	Blue Jays	9–8	**Weaver** (3–0)	Gausman (0–1)	**Holmes** (4)	**Yankee Stadium**	42,250	7–2
10	April 7	Blue Jays	8–3	**Cousins** (1–0)	Francis (0–2)	**Santana** (1)	**Yankee Stadium**	40,569	8–2
11	April 8	Marlins	7–0	**Cortés Jr.** (1–1)	Luzardo (0–2)	—	**Yankee Stadium**	31,071	9–2
12	April 9	Marlins	3–2	**Rodón** (1–0)	Puk (0–3)	**Holmes** (5)	**Yankee Stadium**	37,680	10–2
13	April 10	Marlins	2–5	Weathers (1–1)	**Stroman** (1–1)	Scott (1)	**Yankee Stadium**	36,295	10–3
—	April 12	@ Guardians	Postponed (rain); Makeup: April 13						
14	April 13 (1)	@ Guardians	3–2	**Schmidt** (1–0)	Carrasco (0–1)	**Holmes** (6)	Progressive Field	17,089	11–3
15	April 13 (2)	@ Guardians	8–2	**Poteet** (1–0)	McKenzie (1–2)	—	Progressive Field	31,066	12–3
16	April 14	@ Guardians	7–8 (10)	Beede (1–0)	**Ferguson** (0–2)	—	Progressive Field	28,119	12–4
17	April 15	@ Blue Jays	1–3	Bassitt (2–2)	**Gil** (0–1)	García (2)	Rogers Centre	30,962	12–5
18	April 16	@ Blue Jays	4–5	Kikuchi (1–1)	**Rodón** (1–1)	Romano (1)	Rogers Centre	31,175	12–6
19	April 17	@ Blue Jays	6–4	**González** (1–0)	Swanson (0–1)	**Holmes** (7)	Rogers Centre	30,233	13–6
20	April 19	Rays	5–3	**Santana** (1–0)	Devenski (0–1)	**Holmes** (8)	**Yankee Stadium**	36,055	14–6
21	April 20	Rays	0–2 (10)	Adam (1–0)	**Ferguson** (0–3)	Cleavinger (1)	**Yankee Stadium**	47,629	14–7
22	April 21	Rays	5–4	**Gil** (1–1)	Civale (2–2)	**González** (2)	**Yankee Stadium**	40,022	15–7
23	April 22	Athletics	0–2	Erceg (1–1)	**González** (1–1)	Miller (5)	**Yankee Stadium**	30,366	15–8
24	April 23	Athletics	4–3	**Stroman** (2–1)	Blackburn (2–1)	**Holmes** (9)	**Yankee Stadium**	30,060	16–8
25	April 24	Athletics	7–3	**Schmidt** (2–0)	Boyle (1–4)	—	**Yankee Stadium**	31,179	17–8
26	April 25	Athletics	1–3	Wood (1–2)	**Cortés Jr.** (1–2)	Miller (6)	**Yankee Stadium**	40,141	17–9
27	April 26	@ Brewers	6–7 (11)	Koenig (2–0)	**Tonkin** (1–3)	—	American Family Field	32,314	17–10
28	April 27	@ Brewers	15–3	**Rodón** (2–1)	Ross (1–3)	—	American Family Field	41,620	18–10
29	April 28	@ Brewers	15–5	**Marinaccio** (1–0)	Uribe (2–2)	—	American Family Field	35,295	19–10
30	April 29	@ Orioles	0–2	Rodriguez (4–1)	**Schmidt** (2–1)	Coulombe (1)	Camden Yards	23,184	19–11
31	April 30	@ Orioles	2–4	Kremer (2–2)	**Cortés Jr.** (1–3)	Webb (1)	Camden Yards	21,949	19–12

May: 21–7 (Home: 10–3; Away: 11–4)

#	Date	Opponent	Score	Win	Loss	Save	Stadium	Attendance	Record
32	May 1	@ Orioles	2–0	**Gil** (2–1)	Burnes (3–1)	**Holmes** (10)	Camden Yards	24,180	20–12
33	May 2	@ Orioles	2–7	Akin (1–0)	**Rodón** (2–2)	—	Camden Yards	27,299	20–13
34	May 3	Tigers	2–1	**Santana** (2–0)	Foley (2–1)	—	**Yankee Stadium**	37,386	21–13
35	May 4	Tigers	5–3	**Schmidt** (3–1)	Mize (1–1)	**Holmes** (11)	**Yankee Stadium**	45,017	22–13
36	May 5	Tigers	5–2 (8)	**González** (2–1)	Miller (3–4)	**Santana** (2)	**Yankee Stadium**	35,119	23–13
37	May 7	Astros	10–3	**Gil** (3–1)	Verlander (1–1)	—	**Yankee Stadium**	37,126	24–13
38	May 8	Astros	9–4	**Rodón** (3–2)	Arrighetti (0–4)	—	**Yankee Stadium**	37,660	25–13
39	May 9	Astros	3–4	Blanco (4–0)	**Stroman** (2–2)	Hader (4)	**Yankee Stadium**	38,095	25–14
40	May 10	@ Rays	2–0	**Schmidt** (4–1)	Bradley (0–1)	**Holmes** (12)	Tropicana Field	18,041	26–14
41	May 11	@ Rays	2–7	Littell (2–2)	**Cortés Jr.** (1–4)	—	Tropicana Field	21,308	26–15
42	May 12	@ Rays	10–6	**Gil** (4–1)	Alexander (1–2)	—	Tropicana Field	20,694	27–15
43	May 14	@ Twins	5–1	**Rodón** (4–2)	Paddack (4–2)	—	Target Field	23,805	28–15
44	May 15	@ Twins	4–0	**Stroman** (3–2)	López (4–3)	—	Target Field	22,235	29–15
45	May 16	@ Twins	5–0	**Schmidt** (5–1)	Ryan (2–3)	—	Target Field	31,569	30–15
46	May 17	White Sox	4–2	**Cortés Jr.** (2–4)	Clevinger (0–2)	**Holmes** (13)	**Yankee Stadium**	46,025	31–15
47	May 18	White Sox	6–1	**Gil** (5–1)	Keller (0–2)	—	**Yankee Stadium**	43,194	32–15
48	May 19	White Sox	7–2	**Rodón** (5–2)	Flexen (2–4)	—	**Yankee Stadium**	41,041	33–15
49	May 20	Mariners	4–5	Bazardo (1–0)	**Holmes** (1–1)	Muñoz (9)	**Yankee Stadium**	37,590	33–16
50	May 21	Mariners	3–6	Woo (2–0)	**Schmidt** (5–2)	Muñoz (10)	**Yankee Stadium**	37,257	33–17
51	May 22	Mariners	7–3	**Cortés Jr.** (3–4)	Miller (3–5)	—	**Yankee Stadium**	40,224	34–17
52	May 23	Mariners	5–0	**Gil** (6–1)	Castillo (4–6)	**Holmes** (14)	**Yankee Stadium**	43,121	35–17
53	May 24	@ Padres	8–0	**Rodón** (6–2)	Darvish (4–2)	—	Petco Park	43,505	36–17
54	May 25	@ Padres	4–1	**Stroman** (4–2)	Cease (5–4)	**Holmes** (15)	Petco Park	44,845	37–17
55	May 26	@ Padres	2–5	Estrada (2–0)	**Schmidt** (5–3)	Suárez (15)	Petco Park	45,731	37–18
56	May 28	@ Angels	3–4	Moore (1–1)	**Weaver** (3–1)	Estévez (8)	Angel Stadium	34,894	37–19
57	May 29	@ Angels	2–1	**Gil** (7–1)	Anderson (5–5)	**Holmes** (16)	Angel Stadium	34,313	38–19
58	May 30	@ Angels	8–3	**Rodón** (7–2)	Sandoval (2–8)	—	Angel Stadium	36,312	39–19
59	May 31	@ Giants	6–2	**Stroman** (5–2)	Hicks (4–2)	—	Oracle Park	35,018	40–19

June: 14–13 (Home: 6–6; Away: 8–7)

#	Date	Opponent	Score	Win	Loss	Save	Stadium	Attendance	Record
60	June 1	@ Giants	7–3	**Poteet** (2–0)	Webb (4–5)	—	Oracle Park	34,487	41–19
61	June 2	@ Giants	7–5	**Tonkin** (2–3)	Doval (2–1)	**Holmes** (17)	Oracle Park	39,485	42–19
62	June 4	Twins	5–1	**Gil** (8–1)	Ober (5–4)	—	**Yankee Stadium**	37,139	43–19
63	June 5	Twins	9–5	**Rodón** (8–2)	Paddack (4–3)	—	**Yankee Stadium**	43,202	44–19
64	June 6	Twins	8–5	**Weaver** (4–1)	López (5–6)	**Holmes** (18)	**Yankee Stadium**	41,380	45–19
65	June 7	Dodgers	1–2 (11)	Grove (4–2)	**Hamilton** (0–1)	Ramírez (1)	**Yankee Stadium**	48,048	45–20
66	June 8	Dodgers	3–11	Stone (7–2)	**Cortés Jr.** (3–5)	—	**Yankee Stadium**	48,374	45–21
67	June 9	Dodgers	6–4	**Ferguson** (1–3)	Glasnow (6–5)	**Holmes** (19)	**Yankee Stadium**	48,023	46–21
68	June 10	@ Royals	4–2	**Rodón** (9–2)	Lugo (9–2)	**Tonkin** (1)	Kauffman Stadium	24,038	47–21
69	June 11	@ Royals	10–1	**Stroman** (6–2)	Singer (4–3)	—	Kauffman Stadium	22,437	48–21
70	June 12	@ Royals	11–5	**Poteet** (3–0)	Altavilla (0–1)	—	Kauffman Stadium	25,132	49–21
71	June 13	@ Royals	3–4	McArthur (3–3)	**Holmes** (1–2)	—	Kauffman Stadium	21,875	49–22
72	June 14	@ Red Sox	8–1	**Gil** (9–1)	Bello (6–4)	—	Fenway Park	35,024	50–22
73	June 15	@ Red Sox	4–8	Slaten (4–2)	**Rodón** (9–3)	Jansen (11)	Fenway Park	36,673	50–23
74	June 16	@ Red Sox	3–9	Crawford (3–6)	**Stroman** (6–3)	—	Fenway Park	36,718	50–24
75	June 18	Orioles	4–2	**Cortés Jr.** (4–5)	Suárez (3–1)	—	**Yankee Stadium**	47,429	51–24
76	June 19	Orioles	6–7 (10)	Kimbrel (5–2)	**Holmes** (1–3)	Tate (1)	**Yankee Stadium**	47,155	51–25
77	June 20	Orioles	5–17	Baker (1–0)	**Gil** (9–2)	—	**Yankee Stadium**	45,456	51–26
78	June 21	Braves	1–8	Sale (10–2)	**Rodón** (9–4)	—	**Yankee Stadium**	45,226	51–27
79	June 22	Braves	8–3	**Stroman** (7–3)	Morton (4–4)	—	**Yankee Stadium**	45,056	52–27
80	June 23	Braves	1–3	Fried (7–3)	**Cortés Jr.** (4–6)	Iglesias (20)	**Yankee Stadium**	46,683	52–28
81	June 25	@ Mets	7–9	Núñez (1–0)	**Cole** (0–1)	—	Citi Field	42,824	52–29
82	June 26	@ Mets	2–12	Manaea (5–3)	**Gil** (9–3)	Houser (1)	Citi Field	43,004	52–30
83	June 27	@ Blue Jays	2–9	Berríos (7–6)	**Rodón** (9–5)	—	Rogers Centre	36,423	52–31
84	June 28	@ Blue Jays	16–5	**Tonkin** (3–3)	Kikuchi (4–8)	—	Rogers Centre	34,791	53–31
85	June 29	@ Blue Jays	3–9	Bassitt (7–6)	**Cortés Jr.** (4–7)	—	Rogers Centre	37,448	53–32
86	June 30	@ Blue Jays	8–1	**Cole** (1–1)	Gausman (6–7)	—	Rogers Centre	38,534	54–32

July: 11–13 (Home: 3–9; Away: 8–4)

#	Date	Opponent	Score	Win	Loss	Save	Stadium	Attendance	Record
87	July 2	Reds	4–5	Ashcraft (5–4)	**Gil** (9–4)	Díaz (18)	**Yankee Stadium**	41,219	54–33
88	July 3	Reds	2–3	Abbott (8–6)	**Rodón** (9–6)	Díaz (19)	**Yankee Stadium**	47,646	54–34
89	July 4	Reds	4–8	Montas (4–6)	**Stroman** (7–4)	—	**Yankee Stadium**	43,154	54–35
90	July 5	Red Sox	3–5 (10)	Slaten (5–2)	**Kahnle** (0–1)	Jansen (17)	**Yankee Stadium**	47,158	54–36
91	July 6	Red Sox	14–4	**Hill** (2–0)	Bernardino (3–2)	—	**Yankee Stadium**	45,504	55–36
92	July 7	Red Sox	0–3	Crawford (5–7)	**Gil** (9–5)	Jansen (18)	**Yankee Stadium**	45,250	55–37
93	July 9	@ Rays	3–5	Pepiot (5–5)	**Rodón** (9–7)	Fairbanks (15)	Tropicana Field	20,436	55–38
94	July 10	@ Rays	2–1	**Hill** (3–0)	Eflin (5–6)	**Holmes** (20)	Tropicana Field	19,246	56–38
95	July 11	@ Rays	4–5	Kelly (3–1)	**Cortés Jr.** (4–8)	Fairbanks (16)	Tropicana Field	23,438	56–39
96	July 12	@ Orioles	4–1	**Cole** (2–1)	Povich (1–4)	**Holmes** (21)	Camden Yards	39,566	57–39
97	July 13	@ Orioles	6–1	**Gil** (10–5)	Rodriguez (11–4)	—	Camden Yards	44,018	58–39
98	July 14	@ Orioles	5–6	Kimbrel (6–2)	**Holmes** (1–4)	—	Camden Yards	39,031	58–40
**94th All-Star Game in Arlington, Texas**
99	July 19	Rays	6–1	**Cole** (3–1)	Eflin (5–7)	—	**Yankee Stadium**	47,036	59–40
100	July 20	Rays	1–9	Bradley (5–4)	**Cortés Jr.** (4–9)	—	**Yankee Stadium**	43,173	59–41
101	July 21	Rays	4–6	Cleavinger (6–2)	**Stroman** (7–5)	Fairbanks (18)	**Yankee Stadium**	45,178	59–42
102	July 22	Rays	9–1	**Rodón** (10–7)	Littell (3–7)	—	**Yankee Stadium**	40,824	60–42
103	July 23	Mets	2–3	Quintana (5–6)	**Tonkin** (3–4)	Diekman (4)	**Yankee Stadium**	47,453	60–43
104	July 24	Mets	3–12	Ottavino (2–2)	**Cole** (3–2)	—	**Yankee Stadium**	48,760	60–44
105	July 26	@ Red Sox	7–9	Horn (1–1)	**Weaver** (4–2)	Jansen (20)	Fenway Park	36,661	60–45
106	July 27	@ Red Sox	11–8 (10)	**Holmes** (2–4)	Anderson (0–2)	—	Fenway Park	36,711	61–45
107	July 28	@ Red Sox	8–2	**Rodón** (11–7)	Houck (8–7)	—	Fenway Park	36,410	62–45
108	July 29	@ Phillies	14–4	**Gil** (11–5)	Wheeler (10–5)	—	Citizens Bank Park	44,289	63–45
109	July 30	@ Phillies	7–6 (12)	**Tonkin** (4–4)	Kerkering (2–2)	—	Citizens Bank Park	44,502	64–45
110	July 31	@ Phillies	6–5	**Cortés Jr.** (5–9)	Sánchez (7–7)	**Holmes** (22)	Citizens Bank Park	44,543	65–45

August: 14–12 (Home: 10–7; Away: 4–5)

#	Date	Opponent	Score	Win	Loss	Save	Stadium	Attendance	Record
111	August 2	Blue Jays	5–8	Little (1–1)	**Stroman** (7–6)	Green (8)	**Yankee Stadium**	44,883	65–46
112	August 3	Blue Jays	8–3	**Rodón** (12–7)	Berríos (9–9)	**Holmes** (23)	**Yankee Stadium**	40,218	66–46
113	August 4	Blue Jays	4–3 (10)	**Leiter Jr.** (3–4)	Francis (4–3)	—	**Yankee Stadium**	44,237	67–46
—	August 6	Angels	Postponed (rain); Makeup: August 7						
114	August 7 (1)	Angels	5–2	**Gil** (12–5)	Daniel (1–3)	**Holmes** (24)	**Yankee Stadium**	see 2nd game	68–46
115	August 7 (2)	Angels	2–8	Strickland (3–1)	**Warren** (0–1)	—	**Yankee Stadium**	40,744	68–47
116	August 8	Angels	4–9	Anderson (9–10)	**Cortés Jr.** (5–10)	—	**Yankee Stadium**	40,681	68–48
—	August 9	Rangers	Postponed (rain); Makeup: August 10						
117	August 10 (1)	Rangers	8–0	**Rodón** (13–7)	Eovaldi (8–6)	—	**Yankee Stadium**	see 2nd game	69–48
118	August 10 (2)	Rangers	4–9	Bradford (4–0)	**Weaver** (4–3)	—	**Yankee Stadium**	41,996	69–49
119	August 11	Rangers	8–7	**Stroman** (8–6)	Heaney (4–12)	**Holmes** (25)	**Yankee Stadium**	45,318	70–49
120	August 12	@ White Sox	2–12	Toussaint (1–2)	**Gil** (12–6)	—	Guaranteed Rate Field	22,815	70–50
121	August 13	@ White Sox	4–1	**Cortés Jr.** (6–10)	Cannon (2–6)	**Cousins** (1)	Guaranteed Rate Field	21,199	71–50
122	August 14	@ White Sox	10–2	**Hill** (4–0)	Leone (0–2)	**Tonkin** (2)	Guaranteed Rate Field	22,675	72–50
123	August 16	@ Tigers	3–0	**Cole** (4–2)	Brieske (1–3)	**Holmes** (26)	Comerica Park	36,244	73–50
124	August 17	@ Tigers	0–4	Montero (4–5)	**Rodón** (13–8)	—	Comerica Park	38,110	73–51
125	August 18	@ Tigers (Note: Played in Williamsport, Pennsylvania)	2–3 (10)	Brieske (2–3)	**Leiter Jr.** (3–5)	—	Bowman Field	2,532	73–52
126	August 20	Guardians	5–9 (12)	Herrin (5–0)	**Mayza** (0–2)	—	**Yankee Stadium**	41,426	73–53
127	August 21	Guardians	8–1	**Cortés Jr.** (7–10)	Cantillo (0–3)	—	**Yankee Stadium**	41,263	74–53
128	August 22	Guardians	6–0	**Cole** (5–2)	Williams (2–6)	—	**Yankee Stadium**	38,105	75–53
129	August 23	Rockies	3–0	**Rodón** (14–8)	Freeland (3–6)	**Holmes** (27)	**Yankee Stadium**	38,910	76–53
130	August 24	Rockies	2–9	Blalock (1–0)	**Warren** (0–2)	—	**Yankee Stadium**	40,438	76–54
131	August 25	Rockies	10–3	**Stroman** (9–6)	Gomber (4–9)	—	**Yankee Stadium**	41,324	77–54
132	August 26	@ Nationals	5–2	**Cortés Jr.** (8–10)	Parker (7–8)	**Holmes** (28)	Nationals Park	32,812	78–54
133	August 27	@ Nationals	2–4	Corbin (4–12)	**Cole** (5–3)	Finnegan (33)	Nationals Park	34,334	78–55
134	August 28	@ Nationals	2–5	Gore (8–11)	**Rodón** (14–9)	Finnegan (34)	Nationals Park	30,190	78–56
135	August 30	Cardinals	6–3	**Stroman** (10–6)	Fedde (8–8)	**Holmes** (29)	**Yankee Stadium**	47,103	79–56
136	August 31	Cardinals	5–6	Gibson (8–6)	**Warren** (0–3)	Helsley (42)	**Yankee Stadium**	41,454	79–57

September: 15–11 (Home: 7–7; Away: 8–4)

#	Date	Opponent	Score	Win	Loss	Save	Stadium	Attendance	Record
137	September 1	Cardinals	7–14	Romero (6–2)	**Cousins** (1–1)	—	**Yankee Stadium**	42,768	79–58
138	September 2	@ Rangers	8–4	**Cole** (6–3)	Leiter (0–2)	—	Globe Life Field	36,815	80–58
139	September 3	@ Rangers	4–7	Pennington (1–0)	**Holmes** (2–5)	—	Globe Life Field	29,356	80–59
140	September 4	@ Rangers	6–10	Eovaldi (11–7)	**Stroman** (10–7)	Yates (26)	Globe Life Field	32,223	80–60
141	September 6	@ Cubs	3–0	**Gil** (13–6)	Wicks (2–3)	**Weaver** (1)	Wrigley Field	40,101	81–60
142	September 7	@ Cubs	2–0	**Cortés Jr.** (9–10)	Assad (7–5)	—	Wrigley Field	40,080	82–60
143	September 8	@ Cubs	1–2	Taillon (10–8)	**Cole** (6–4)	Hodge (4)	Wrigley Field	39,364	82–61
144	September 9	Royals	10–4	**Cousins** (2–1)	McArthur (5–7)	—	**Yankee Stadium**	35,308	83–61
145	September 10	Royals	0–5	Lugo (16–8)	**Stroman** (10–8)	—	**Yankee Stadium**	34,485	83–62
146	September 11	Royals	4–3 (11)	**Weaver** (5–3)	Bubic (0–1)	—	**Yankee Stadium**	40,080	84–62
147	September 12	Red Sox	2–1 (10)	**Holmes** (3–5)	Winckowski (4–2)	—	**Yankee Stadium**	40,229	85–62
148	September 13	Red Sox	5–4	**Leiter Jr.** (4–5)	Booser (2–3)	**Weaver** (2)	**Yankee Stadium**	45,292	86–62
149	September 14	Red Sox	1–7	Bello (14–7)	**Cole** (6–5)	—	**Yankee Stadium**	46,378	86–63
150	September 15	Red Sox	5–2	**Rodón** (15–9)	Crawford (8–15)	**Kahnle** (1)	**Yankee Stadium**	45,552	87–63
151	September 17	@ Mariners	11–2	**Gil** (14–6)	Woo (8–3)	**Stroman** (1)	T-Mobile Park	31,668	88–63
152	September 18	@ Mariners	2–1 (10)	**Weaver** (6–3)	Snider (3–4)	**Hamilton** (1)	T-Mobile Park	31,674	89–63
153	September 19	@ Mariners	2–3	Gilbert (8–11)	**Schmidt** (5–4)	Muñoz (22)	T-Mobile Park	34,255	89–64
154	September 20	@ Athletics	4–2 (10)	**Cole** (7–5)	McFarland (2–4)	**Weaver** (3)	Oakland Coliseum	23,426	90–64
155	September 21	@ Athletics	10–0	**Rodón** (16–9)	Sears (11–12)	—	Oakland Coliseum	33,198	91–64
156	September 22	@ Athletics	7–4	**Gil** (15–6)	Estes (7–9)	**Weaver** (4)	Oakland Coliseum	24,663	92–64
157	September 24	Orioles	3–5	Kremer (8–10)	**Schmidt** (5–5)	Domínguez (11)	**Yankee Stadium**	41,149	92–65
158	September 25	Orioles	7–9	Webb (2–5)	**Stroman** (10–9)	Akin (1)	**Yankee Stadium**	41,010	92–66
159	September 26	Orioles	10–1	**Cole** (8–5)	Burnes (15–9)	—	**Yankee Stadium**	42,022	93–66
160	September 27	Pirates	2–4	Mlodzinski (5–5)	**Kahnle** (0–2)	Chapman (13)	**Yankee Stadium**	41,778	93–67
161	September 28	Pirates	4–9	Burrows (1–0)	**Gil** (15–7)	Chapman (14)	**Yankee Stadium**	46,069	93–68
162	September 29	Pirates	6–4	**Weaver** (7–3)	Holderman (3–6)	**Holmes** (30)	**Yankee Stadium**	44,108	94–68

=== Opening Day ===
Opening Day starting lineup
No.	Player	Pos.
Batters
25	Gleyber Torres	2B
22	Juan Soto	RF
99	Aaron Judge	CF
27	Giancarlo Stanton	DH
48	Anthony Rizzo	1B
11	Anthony Volpe	SS
24	Alex Verdugo	LF
39	Jose Trevino	C
95	Oswaldo Cabrera	3B
Starting pitcher
65	Nestor Cortés Jr.	

== Postseason ==
=== Postseason game log ===
2024 Postseason game log (8−6) (Home 4−3; Away 4−3)
American League Division Series: 3−1

#	Date	Opponent	Stadium	Score	Win	Loss	Save	Attendance	Record
1	October 5	Royals	Yankee Stadium	6–5	Holmes (1–0)	Lorenzen (0–1)	Weaver (1)	48,790	1–0
2	October 7	Royals	Yankee Stadium	2–4	Zerpa (2–0)	Rodón (0–1)	Erceg (3)	48,034	1–1
3	October 9	@ Royals	Kauffman Stadium	3–2	Kahnle (1–0)	Bubic (0–1)	Weaver (2)	40,312	2–1
4	October 10	@ Royals	Kauffman Stadium	3–1	Cole (1–0)	Wacha (0–1)	Weaver (3)	39,012	3–1

American League Championship Series: 4−1

#	Date	Opponent	Stadium	Score	Win	Loss	Save	Attendance	Record
1	October 14	Guardians	Yankee Stadium	5–2	Rodón (1–1)	Cobb (0–2)	Weaver (4)	47,264	1–0
2	October 15	Guardians	Yankee Stadium	6–3	Holmes (2–0)	Bibee (0–1)	—	47,054	2–0
3	October 17	@ Guardians	Progressive Field	5–7 (10)	Ávila (1–0)	Holmes (2–1)	—	32,531	2–1
4	October 18	@ Guardians	Progressive Field	8–6	Leiter Jr. (1–0)	Clase (0–2)	Kahnle (1)	35,263	3–1
5	October 19	@ Guardians	Progressive Field	5–2 (10)	Weaver (1–0)	Gaddis (1–1)	—	32,545	4–1

World Series: 1−4

#	Date	Opponent	Stadium	Score	Win	Loss	Save	Attendance	Record
1	October 25	@ Dodgers	Dodger Stadium	3–6 (10)	Treinen (1–0)	Cousins (0–1)	—	52,394	0–1
2	October 26	@ Dodgers	Dodger Stadium	2–4	Yamamoto (2–0)	Rodón (1–2)	Vesia (1)	52,725	0–2
3	October 28	Dodgers	Yankee Stadium	2–4	Buehler (1–1)	Schmidt (0–1)	—	49,368	0–3
4	October 29	Dodgers	Yankee Stadium	11–4	Holmes (3–1)	Hudson (0–1)	—	49,354	1–3
5	October 30	Dodgers	Yankee Stadium	6–7	Treinen (2–0)	Kahnle (1–1)	Buehler (1)	49,263	1–4

=== Postseason rosters ===
Playoff rosters
American League Division Series

- Pitchers: 30 Luke Weaver 35 Clay Holmes 36 Clarke Schmidt 41 Tommy Kahnle 45 Gerrit Cole 54 Tim Hill 55 Carlos Rodón 58 Tim Mayza 61 Jake Cousins 71 Ian Hamilton 81 Luis Gil
- Catchers: 28 Austin Wells 39 Jose Trevino
- Infielders: 11 Anthony Volpe 13 Jazz Chisholm Jr. 19 Jon Berti 25 Gleyber Torres 93 Ben Rice 95 Oswaldo Cabrera
- Outfielders: 12 Trent Grisham 22 Juan Soto 24 Alex Verdugo 70 Duke Ellis 89 Jasson Domínguez 99 Aaron Judge
- Designated hitters: 27 Giancarlo Stanton

American League Championship Series

- Pitchers: 0 Marcus Stroman 30 Luke Weaver 35 Clay Holmes 36 Clarke Schmidt 38 Mark Leiter Jr. (Games 4–5) 41 Tommy Kahnle 45 Gerrit Cole 54 Tim Hill 55 Carlos Rodón 58 Tim Mayza 61 Jake Cousins 71 Ian Hamilton (Games 1–3) 81 Luis Gil
- Catchers: 28 Austin Wells 39 Jose Trevino
- Infielders: 11 Anthony Volpe 13 Jazz Chisholm Jr. 19 Jon Berti 25 Gleyber Torres 48 Anthony Rizzo 95 Oswaldo Cabrera
- Outfielders: 12 Trent Grisham 22 Juan Soto 24 Alex Verdugo 89 Jasson Domínguez 99 Aaron Judge
- Designated hitters: 27 Giancarlo Stanton

World Series

- Pitchers: 0 Marcus Stroman 30 Luke Weaver 35 Clay Holmes 36 Clarke Schmidt 38 Mark Leiter Jr. 41 Tommy Kahnle 45 Gerrit Cole 54 Tim Hill 55 Carlos Rodón 58 Tim Mayza 61 Jake Cousins 65 Nestor Cortés Jr. 81 Luis Gil
- Catchers: 28 Austin Wells 39 Jose Trevino
- Infielders: 11 Anthony Volpe 13 Jazz Chisholm Jr. 25 Gleyber Torres 48 Anthony Rizzo 95 Oswaldo Cabrera
- Outfielders: 12 Trent Grisham 22 Juan Soto 24 Alex Verdugo 89 Jasson Domínguez 99 Aaron Judge
- Designated hitters: 27 Giancarlo Stanton

== Roster ==
2024 New York Yankees
Roster
Pitchers: 74 Clayton Andrews; 29,85 Clayton Beeter; 53 Phil Bickford; 57 Nick Burdi; 45 Gerrit Cole; 65 Nestor Cortés Jr.; 61 Jake Cousins; 62 Enyel De Los Santos; 59 Scott Effross; 64 Caleb Ferguson; 81 Luis Gil; 92,94 Yoendrys Gómez; 47 Victor González; 71 Ian Hamilton; 54 Tim Hill; 35 Clay Holmes; 41 Tommy Kahnle; 38 Mark Leiter Jr.; 43 Jonathan Loáisiga; 61,63 Josh Maciejewski; 97 Ron Marinaccio; 58 Tim Mayza; 58 Anthony Misiewicz; 72 Cody Poteet; 55 Carlos Rodón; 53 Dennis Santana; 36 Clarke Schmidt; 0 Marcus Stroman; 50 Michael Tonkin; 98 Will Warren; 30 Luke Weaver	Catchers: 94 Carlos Narváez; 39 Jose Trevino; 28 Austin Wells; Infielders: 19 Jon Berti; 95 Oswaldo Cabrera; 13 Jazz Chisholm Jr.; 38 J. D. Davis; 26 DJ LeMahieu; 91 Oswald Peraza; 93 Ben Rice; 48 Anthony Rizzo; 25 Gleyber Torres; 11 Anthony Volpe	Outfielders: 89 Jasson Domínguez; 70 Duke Ellis; 12 Trent Grisham; 14 Jahmai Jones; 99 Aaron Judge (captain); 22 Juan Soto; 33 Taylor Trammell; 24 Alex Verdugo; Other batters: 74 Kevin Smith; 27 Giancarlo Stanton	Manager: 17 Aaron Boone; Coaches: 68 Brad Ausmus (bench); 77 Matt Blake (pitching); 75 Travis Chapman (first base/infield); 79 Desi Druschel (assistant pitching); 78 Casey Dykes (assistant hitting); 60 Mike Harkey (bullpen); 66 Pat Roessler (assistant hitting); 67 Luis Rojas (third base/outfield); 62 James Rowson (hitting); 76 Tanner Swanson (quality control/catching)

== Player stats ==
= Indicates team leader

= Indicates league leader

=== Batting ===
Note: G = Games played; AB = At bats; R = Runs scored; H = Hits; 2B = Doubles; 3B = Triples; HR = Home runs; RBI = Runs batted in; SB = Stolen bases; BB = Walks; AVG = Batting average; SLG = Slugging average

Player	G	AB	R	H	2B	3B	HR	RBI	SB	BB	AVG	SLG
Anthony Volpe	160	637	90	155	27	7	12	60	28	42	.243	.364
Gleyber Torres	154	587	80	151	26	0	15	63	4	65	.257	.378
Juan Soto	157	576	128	166	31	4	41	109	7	129	.288	.569
Aaron Judge	158	559	122	180	36	1	58	144	10	133	.322	.701
Alex Verdugo	149	559	74	130	28	1	13	61	2	49	.233	.356
Giancarlo Stanton	114	417	49	97	20	0	27	72	0	38	.233	.475
Austin Wells	115	354	42	81	18	1	13	55	1	47	.229	.395
Anthony Rizzo	92	337	38	77	12	0	8	35	0	27	.228	.335
Oswaldo Cabrera	108	299	47	74	11	0	8	36	4	21	.247	.365
Jose Trevino	73	209	26	45	5	0	8	28	1	20	.215	.354
DJ LeMahieu	67	201	19	41	5	0	2	26	0	19	.204	.259
Trent Grisham	76	179	21	34	8	0	9	31	1	22	.190	.385
Jazz Chisholm Jr.	46	176	28	48	7	0	11	23	18	14	.273	.500
Ben Rice	50	152	20	26	6	0	7	23	0	20	.171	.349
Jon Berti	25	66	10	18	0	0	1	6	5	6	.273	.318
Jasson Dominguez	18	56	8	10	1	0	2	4	5	11	.179	.304
Jahmai Jones	33	42	8	10	1	1	1	4	1	2	.238	.381
J. D. Davis	7	19	1	2	1	0	0	1	0	3	.105	.158
Carlos Narváez	6	13	0	3	0	0	0	0	0	2	.231	.231
Oswald Peraza	4	10	2	2	0	0	1	1	0	1	.200	.500
Taylor Trammell	5	1	2	1	0	0	0	0	0	1	1.000	1.000
Duke Ellis	3	1	0	1	0	0	0	0	1	0	1.000	1.000
Kevin Smith	2	0	0	0	0	0	0	0	0	0	.---	.---
Team totals	162	5450	815	1352	243	15	237	782	88	672	.248	.429

Source:Baseball Reference

=== Pitching ===
Note= W = Wins; L = Losses; ERA = Earned run average; G = Games pitched; GS = Games started; SV = Saves; IP = Innings pitched; H = Hits allowed; R = Runs allowed; ER = Earned runs; BB = Walks allowed; SO = Strikeouts

Player	W	L	ERA	G	GS	SV	IP	H	R	ER	BB	SO
Carlos Rodón	16	9	3.96	32	32	0	175.0	157	81	77	57	195
Nestor Cortés Jr.	9	10	3.77	31	30	0	174.1	162	74	73	39	162
Marcus Stroman	10	9	4.31	30	29	1	154.2	167	81	74	60	113
Luis Gil	15	7	3.50	29	29	0	151.2	104	60	59	77	171
Gerrit Cole	8	5	3.41	17	17	0	95.0	78	38	36	29	99
Clarke Schmidt	5	5	2.85	16	16	0	85.1	71	31	27	30	93
Luke Weaver	7	3	2.89	62	0	4	84.0	52	28	27	26	103
Clay Holmes	3	5	3.14	67	0	30	63.0	60	29	22	22	68
Michael Tonkin	3	2	3.38	39	0	2	56.0	44	26	21	21	57
Tim Hill	3	0	2.05	35	0	0	44.0	36	13	10	9	18
Tommy Kahnle	0	2	2.11	50	0	1	42.2	30	16	10	19	46
Jake Cousins	2	1	2.37	37	0	1	38.0	20	14	10	20	53
Ian Hamilton	0	1	3.82	35	0	1	37.2	37	17	16	14	41
Caleb Ferguson	1	3	5.13	42	0	1	33.1	34	24	19	16	41
Dennis Santana	2	0	6.26	23	0	2	27.1	27	19	19	10	19
Cody Poteet	3	0	2.22	5	4	0	24.1	18	7	6	8	16
Victor González	2	1	3.86	27	0	2	23.1	13	12	10	13	11
Ron Marinaccio	1	0	3.86	16	0	0	23.1	18	11	10	10	25
Will Warren	0	3	10.32	6	5	0	22.2	33	27	26	10	29
Mark Leiter Jr.	2	1	4.98	21	0	0	21.2	28	14	12	9	33
Tim Mayza	0	1	4.00	15	0	0	18.0	18	10	8	3	12
Yoendrys Gómez	0	0	3.97	5	0	0	11.1	11	5	5	7	10
Nick Burdi	1	0	1.86	12	0	0	9.2	5	2	2	9	12
Phil Bickford	0	0	8.64	8	0	0	8.1	10	9	8	1	6
Josh Maciejewski	0	0	2.57	4	0	0	7.0	4	2	2	2	7
Enyel De Los Santos	0	0	14.21	5	0	0	6.1	13	10	10	3	5
Jonathan Loáisiga	1	0	0.00	3	0	0	4.0	7	0	0	1	3
Clayton Beeter	0	0	4.91	3	0	0	3.2	4	2	2	1	5
Scott Effross	0	0	5.40	3	0	0	3.1	3	2	2	2	2
Jose Trevino	0	0	13.50	2	0	0	2.0	5	3	3	2	0
Anthony Misiewicz	0	0	0.00	1	0	0	1.0	2	0	0	1	1
Clayton Andrews	0	0	27.00	1	0	0	0.1	1	1	1	0	1
Oswaldo Cabrera	0	0	0.00	1	0	0	0.1	0	0	0	2	0
Team totals	94	68	3.74	162	162	45	1452.2	1272	668	604	533	1457

Source:Baseball Reference

== Farm system ==
Level	Team	League	Manager
AAA	Scranton/Wilkes-Barre RailRiders	International League	Shelley Duncan
AA	Somerset Patriots	Eastern League	Raul Dominguez
High-A	Hudson Valley Renegades	South Atlantic League	Nick Ortiz
Low-A	Tampa Tarpons	Florida State League	James Cooper
Rookie	FCL Yankees	Florida Complex League	Ryan Chipka
Rookie	DSL NYY Bombers	Dominican Summer League	Carlos Vidal
Rookie	DSL NYY Yankees	Dominican Summer League	Parker Guinn
