= Tyrone Taylor =

American baseball player (born 1994)

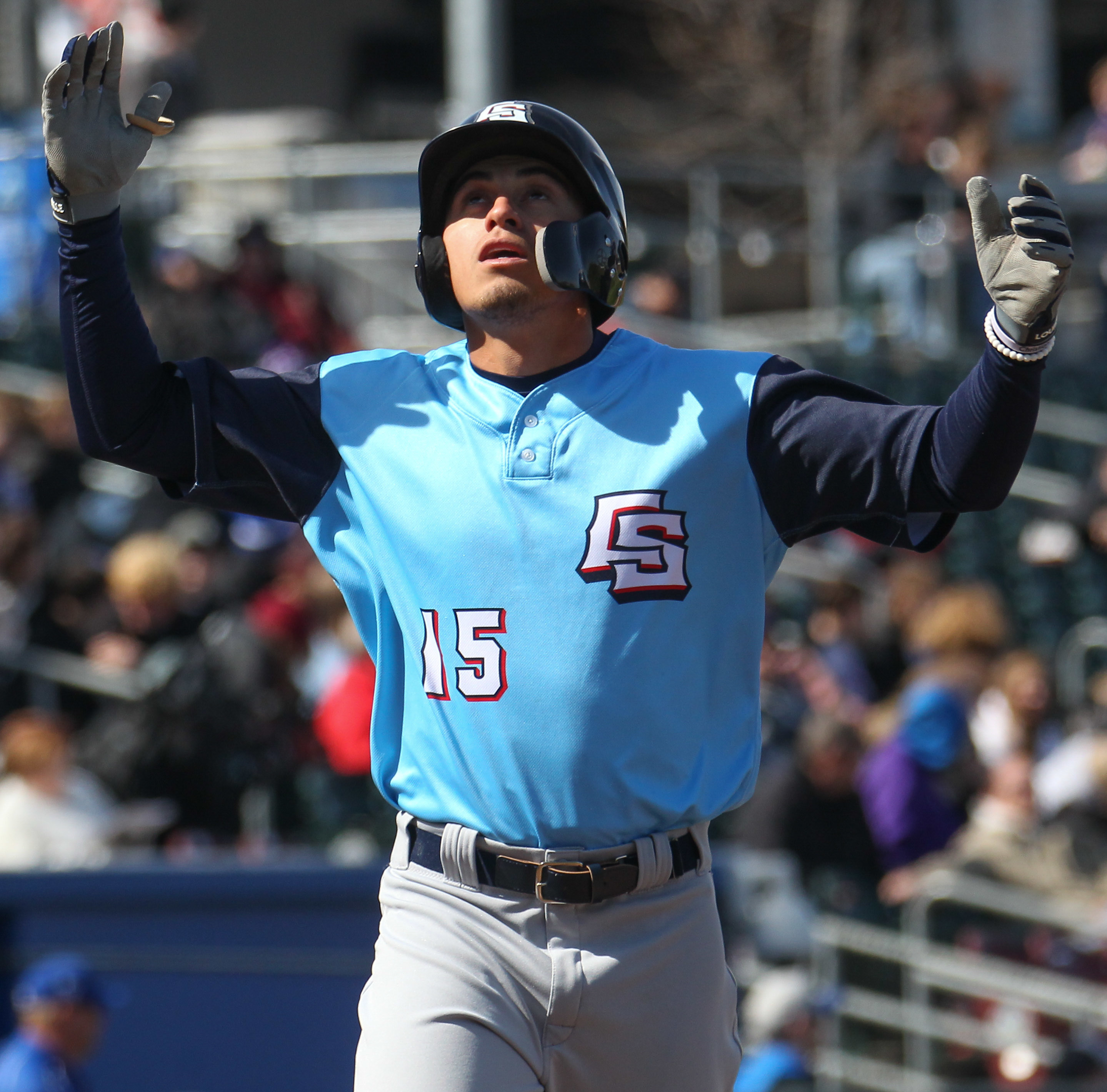
- Taylor with the Colorado Springs Sky Sox in 2018

Free agent
- Outfielder
- Born: January 22, 1994 (age 32); Torrance, California, U.S.
- Bats: Right Throws: Right

MLB debut
- September 7, 2019, for the Milwaukee Brewers

MLB statistics (through 2026 season)
- Batting average: .243
- Home runs: 61
- Runs batted in: 236
- Stats at Baseball Reference

Teams
- Milwaukee Brewers (2019–2023); New York Mets (2024–2026); Chicago Cubs (2026)

Tyrone Anthony Taylor (born January 22, 1994) is an American professional baseball outfielder who is a free agent. He has played in Major League Baseball (MLB) for the Milwaukee Brewers, New York Mets, and Chicago Cubs. He made his MLB debut in 2019.

== Amateur career ==
Taylor attended Torrance High School in Torrance, California. He committed to play college baseball at California State University, Fullerton.

== Professional career ==
=== Milwaukee Brewers ===
The Milwaukee Brewers selected Taylor in the second round of the 2012 Major League Baseball draft. He signed with the Brewers rather than going to college.

Taylor made his professional debut that year for the Helena Brewers and also played for the Arizona League Brewers. In 75 at-bats over 18 games, he hit .387/.434/.667 with two home runs. He played the 2013 season with the Wisconsin Timber Rattlers. In 122 games, he hit .274/.338/.400 with eight home runs in 485 at-bats. Prior to the 2014 season, he was ranked by Baseball America as the Brewers' second-best prospect. He started the season with the Brevard County Manatees.

On April 29, 2014, Taylor hit for the cycle against the Clearwater Threshers on his mother's 35th birthday. It was the first cycle in Manatees history. He split the 2014 season between the Manatees and the Huntsville Stars, hitting .273/.326/.388/.714 with 6 home runs and 68 RBI. He spent the 2015 season with the Biloxi Shuckers, hitting .260/.312/.337/.649 with 3 home runs and 43 RBI. He returned to Biloxi for the 2016 season, hitting .232/.303/.327/.630 with 9 home runs and 34 RBI.

He split the 2017 season between the AZL Brewers and Biloxi, hitting .287/.355/.509/.864 with 5 home runs and 13 RBI over just 25 games due to hamstring injuries. Languishing in the minors, he went to Los Angeles in 2017 and saw MLB hitting consultant Craig Wallenbrock, who taught him to make adjustments at the plate.

He played for the Colorado Springs Sky Sox in 2018, hitting .278/.321/.504/.825 with 20 home runs and 80 RBI. The Brewers added him to their 40-man roster after the 2018 offseason. He split the 2019 minor league season between the AZL Brewers and the San Antonio Missions, hitting .275/.342/.462 with 14 home runs and 59 RBI.

On September 7, 2019, the Brewers promoted Taylor to the major leagues. He made his major league debut that night. Taylor appeared in 22 games for the Brewers in 2020, hitting .237/.293/.500 with 2 home runs and 6 RBI in 38 at-bats.

Taylor appeared in 93 games for the Brewers in 2021, hitting .247/.321/.457 with 12 home runs, 43 RBI, and 6 stolen bases. In 2022, Taylor hit .233/.286/.442 with 17 home runs and 51 RBI in 405 plate appearances across 120 games.

During spring training in 2023, Taylor was kept out after his recovery from a right elbow sprain suffered in the previous year went slower than hoped. On March 1, 2023, it was announced that Taylor had received a platelet-rich plasma injection in his right elbow and would miss the first month of the season.

=== New York Mets ===
On December 20, 2023, the Brewers traded Taylor and Adrian Houser to the New York Mets in exchange for Coleman Crow. It was one of the first big moves made by Mets' president of baseball operations David Stearns after he left the Brewers. On April 4, 2024, with the Mets at an 0–5 record, Taylor hit his first career walk-off RBI, off of Detroit Tigers' pitcher Alex Faedo, giving New York their first victory of the season.

Taylor played in 130 games for the Mets in 2024, batting .248/.299/.401 with 7 home runs and 35 RBI. After manager Carlos Mendoza started him at every outfield position, he ended the season at center field, edging out teammate Harrison Bader for the job. "[Taylor is] the type of player that makes winning plays and helps you win a baseball game," Mendoza said.

On October 14, during Game 2 of the National League Championship Series, Taylor hit the first postseason RBI of his career, a double off of Landon Knack of the Los Angeles Dodgers to score Starling Marte in the 2nd inning. The Mets would win the game 7–3, but ultimately lose the series in six games.

Taylor played in 113 games for the Mets in 2025, batting .223/.279/.319 with 2 home runs and 27 RBI.

In 67 games for the Mets in 2026, Taylor batted .241/.290/.503 with a .798 OPS, 10 home runs, and 28 RBI.

=== Chicago Cubs ===
On August 3, 2026, the Mets traded Taylor and Clay Holmes to the Chicago Cubs in exchange for Jefferson Rojas. Taylor played in 30 games for the Cubs in 2026, batting .351/.390/.500 with an .890 OPS, one home run, and 10 RBI.

== Personal life ==
Taylor's mother, Marisa Thompson, gave birth to him when she was 14. He attended her games when she played softball at Torrance High School, which is also his alma mater. She wore number 15, which is why he chose the number. "I love her so much," he said. "For her to have me at such a young age and do such a good job of raising me is pretty wild.” While growing up they lived with his grandmother, Margarita Herrera, and great grandmother, Annie Luna.

Taylor has a daughter, Saige, and son, Stone.
