= Clayton Andrews (baseball, born 1997) =

American baseball player (born 1997)

Olmecas de Tabasco – No. 37
- Pitcher
- Born: January 4, 1997 (age 29); Petaluma, California, U.S.
- Bats: Left Throws: Left

MLB debut
- July 1, 2023, for the Milwaukee Brewers

MLB statistics (through 2024 season)
- Win–loss record: 0–1
- Earned run average: 27.00
- Strikeouts: 5
- Stats at Baseball Reference

Teams
- Milwaukee Brewers (2023); New York Yankees (2024)

Clayton Davis Andrews (born January 4, 1997) is an American professional baseball pitcher for the Olmecas de Tabasco of the Mexican League. He has previously played in Major League Baseball (MLB) for the Milwaukee Brewers and New York Yankees.

== Amateur career ==
Andrews attended Maria Carrillo High School in Santa Rosa, California, graduating in 2015. He attended Cabrillo College and the Los Angeles Dodgers selected him in the 40th round of the 2017 Major League Baseball (MLB) draft. He did not sign and attended California State University, Long Beach, where he played college baseball for the Long Beach State Dirtbags as a two-way player.

== Professional career ==
=== Milwaukee Brewers ===
The Milwaukee Brewers selected Andrews in the 17th round, with the 515th overall selection, of the 2018 Major League Baseball draft, and he signed. Andrews spent his first professional season with the rookie–level Helena Brewers and Single–A Wisconsin Timber Rattlers, recording a cumulative 6–1 record and 2.18 ERA across 19 contests.

In 2019, Andrews played with the High–A Carolina Mudcats and Double–A Biloxi Shuckers, going 5–2 with 11 saves and a 3.19 ERA, and 77 strikeouts in 59 1/3 innings. After the season, he played in the Arizona Fall League. Andrews did not play in a game in 2020 due to the cancellation of the minor league season because of the COVID-19 pandemic. In 2021, Andrews spent the season with the Triple–A Nashville Sounds. In seven games for Nashville, Andrews posted a 4.82 ERA with 11 strikeouts across 9 1/3 innings pitched. In 2022, Andrews played in nine games split between Double–A Biloxi and rookie–level Arizona Complex League Brewers, struggling to a 7.84 ERA with 19 strikeouts across 10 1/3 innings of work.

Andrews began the 2023 season with the Triple–A Nashville Sounds. In 25 appearances, he registered a 1.65 ERA with 41 strikeouts in 32 2/3 innings pitched. On July 1, 2023, Andrews was selected to the 40-man roster and promoted to the major leagues for the first time. In four appearances for Milwaukee, he struggled to a 27.00 ERA with four strikeouts across 3 1/3 innings of work. Andrews was designated for assignment by the Brewers on February 7, 2024.

=== New York Yankees ===
On February 14, 2024, the Brewers traded Andrews to the New York Yankees in exchange for Joshua Quezada. He was optioned to the Triple–A Scranton/Wilkes-Barre RailRiders to begin the 2024 season. On April 8, Andrews was designated for assignment following the promotion of Josh Maciejewski. He cleared waivers and was sent outright to Triple–A on April 13. On May 20, the Yankees selected Andrews' contract, adding him to their active roster. He made one appearance for the team, allowing one earned run in 1/3 of an inning. On June 20, Andrews was designated for assignment by the Yankees. He again cleared waivers and was sent outright to Scranton on June 26. Andrews elected free agency the following day.

=== San Francisco Giants ===
On July 8, 2024, Andrews signed a minor league contract with the San Francisco Giants. In two appearances for the rookie–level Arizona Complex League Giants, he allowed five runs on four hits and two walks with two strikeouts over 1 1/3 innings. Andrews was released by the Giants organization on August 1.

=== Tigres de Quintana Roo ===
On March 11, 2025, Andrews signed with the Lake Country DockHounds of the American Association of Professional Baseball. Prior to the start of the season on April 13, Andrews signed with the Tigres de Quintana Roo of the Mexican League. He made 48 appearances for Quintana Roo, compiling a 3-4 record and 4.18 ERA with 56 strikeouts and 13 saves across 47 1/3 innings pitched.

=== Caliente de Durango ===
On March 30, 2026, Andrews was traded to the Caliente de Durango of the Mexican League in exchange for Jonathan Partida. In 34 relief appearances, he posted a 4–3 record with a 4.94 ERA, 36 strikeouts, and three saves across 31 innings pitched.

=== Olmecas de Tabasco ===
On July 8, 2026, Andrews was traded to the Olmecas de Tabasco of the Mexican League.

== International career ==
On October 10, 2019, he was selected for the United States national baseball team in the 2019 WBSC Premier 12.
