= Jefferson Rojas =

Dominican baseball player (born 2005)

- Rojas with the South Bend Cubs

New York Mets
- Second baseman / Shortstop
- Born: April 25, 2005 (age 21); Puerto Plata, Dominican Republic
- Bats: Right Throws: Right

Jefferson Rojas (born April 25, 2005) is a Dominican professional baseball second baseman and shortstop for the New York Mets of Major League Baseball (MLB).

== Professional career ==
=== Chicago Cubs ===
On January 15, 2022, Rojas signed with the Chicago Cubs as the 36th-ranked international free agent. He was only 16 years old at the time of his signing. He was assigned to the Dominican Summer League Cubs on June 4. In 45 games, Rojas slashed .303/.391/.407 with 44 hits, 19 RBIs, 27 runs, and 15 stolen bases.

On June 5, 2023, Rojas made a one-game stop with the Arizona Complex League Cubs. He didn't record a hit in three at-bats but was promoted to the Single-A Myrtle Beach Pelicans the next day. In 70 games, Rojas recorded 73 hits, 31 RBIs, 48 runs, and 13 stolen bases.

On February 23, 2024, Rojas was assigned to the Cubs' spring training roster before being activated on March 7. After playing six games during the spring, Rojas was assigned to the High-A South Bend Cubs. On April 10, Rojas went 4-for-5 with a triple, three RBIs, and two stolen bases against the Wisconsin Timber Rattlers. Two days later, Rojas hit a walk-off home run against the Timber Rattlers to win the second game of the doubleheader. On April 18, Rojas was added to the Baseball America Top 100 MLB Prospects as the 99th-ranked prospect.

On February 10, 2025, Rojas was named the 97th best prospect in Major League Baseball (MLB). Rojas was placed on the 7-day injured list (IL) with a hamstring injury on April 4. On April 15, he was activated from the IL. Rojas made his season debut with South Bend against the West Michigan Whitecaps on April 16, starting at second base and finishing 0-for-4 with a walk in the 2–1 loss that went to extra innings.

=== New York Mets ===
On August 3, 2026, the Cubs traded Rojas to the New York Mets in exchange for Clay Holmes and Tyrone Taylor. The Mets assigned him to their Double–A affiliate, the Binghamton Rumble Ponies.
