= Caleb Ferguson =

American baseball player (born 1996)

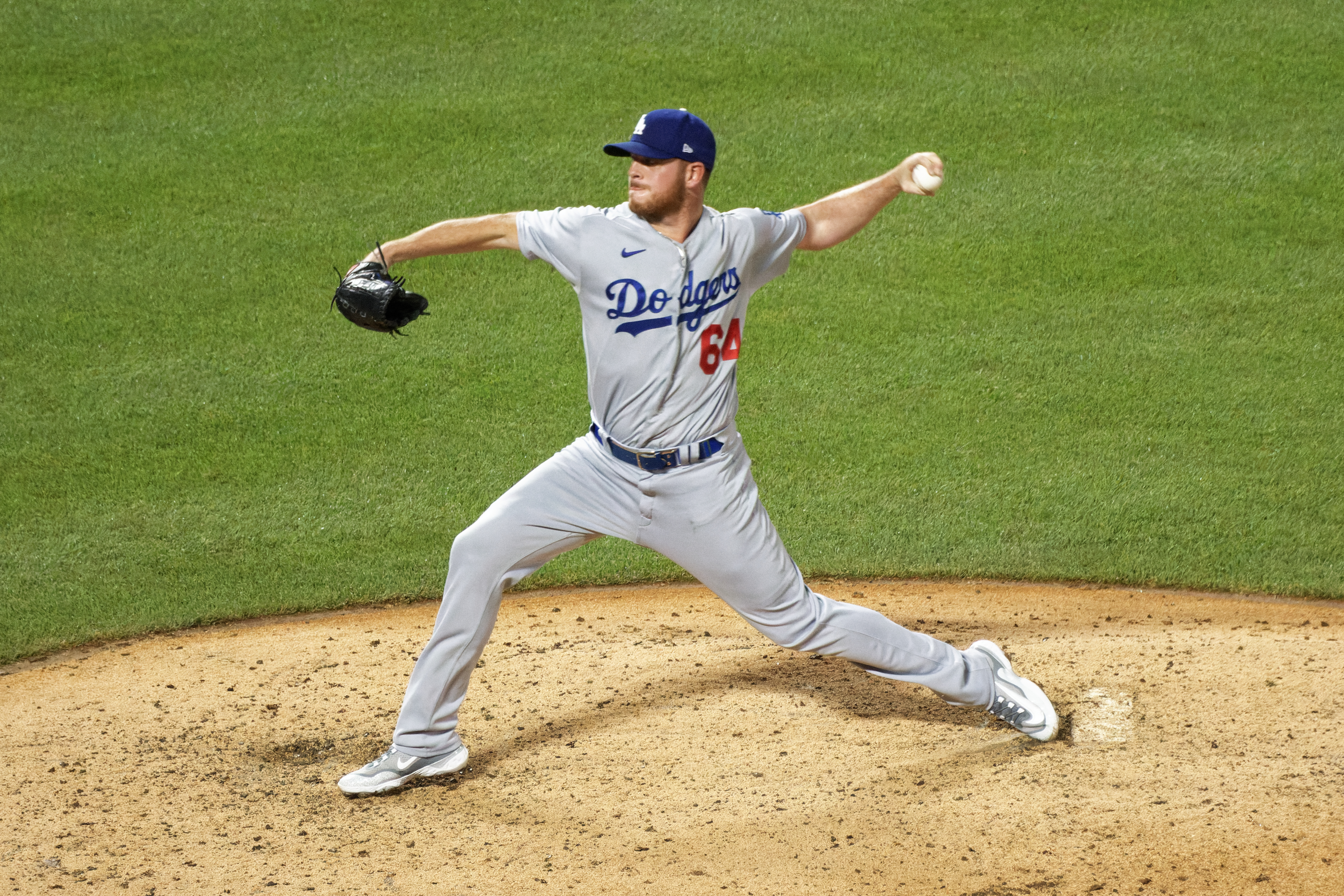
- Ferguson with the Dodgers in 2023

Free agent
- Pitcher
- Born: July 2, 1996 (age 30); Columbus, Ohio, U.S.
- Bats: Right Throws: Left

MLB debut
- June 6, 2018, for the Los Angeles Dodgers

MLB statistics (through 2026 season)
- Win–loss record: 25–17
- Earned run average: 3.80
- Strikeouts: 396
- Stats at Baseball Reference

Teams
- Los Angeles Dodgers (2018–2020, 2022–2023); New York Yankees (2024); Houston Astros (2024); Pittsburgh Pirates (2025); Seattle Mariners (2025); Cincinnati Reds (2026); St. Louis Cardinals (2026)

Caleb Paul Ferguson (born July 2, 1996) is an American professional baseball pitcher who is a free agent. He has previously played in Major League Baseball (MLB) for the Los Angeles Dodgers, New York Yankees, Houston Astros, Pittsburgh Pirates, Seattle Mariners, Cincinnati Reds, and St. Louis Cardinals.

== Amateur career ==
Growing up in West Jefferson, Ohio, Ferguson learned to throw a curveball after a pitching coach gave him a yo-yo. Ferguson attended West Jefferson High School. He added 5 miles per hour to his fastball every year in high school. As a senior in 2014, he underwent Tommy John surgery. Despite the injury, the Los Angeles Dodgers drafted him in the 38th round of the 2014 Major League Baseball draft. He signed with the Dodgers, forgoing his commitment to play college baseball at West Virginia University, though Ferguson said the Mountaineers were considering revoking his scholarship offer following his injury.

== Professional career ==
=== Los Angeles Dodgers ===
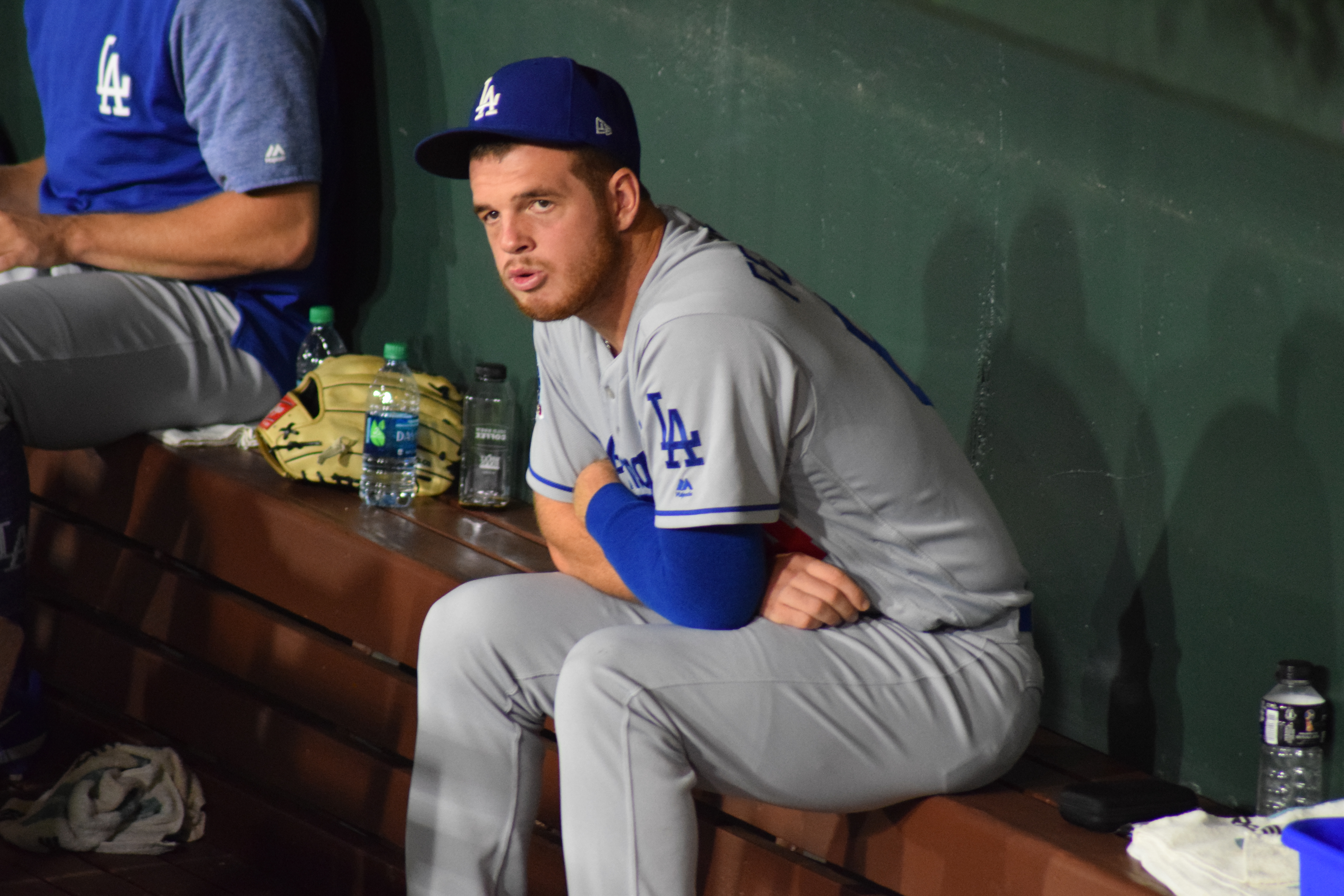
Ferguson with the Dodgers in 2018

Ferguson made his professional debut the year after he was drafted, with the Arizona League Dodgers in 2015, pitching to a 0–3 record and 8.59 ERA in 14 2/3 innings. In 2016, he played for the Arizona League Dodgers, Ogden Raptors, and Great Lakes Loons, compiling a 3–4 record and 2.31 ERA in 14 games (12 starts). He pitched 2017 with the Rancho Cucamonga Quakes where he was 9–4 with a 2.87 ERA in 25 games (24 starts). Ferguson started 2018 with the Tulsa Drillers and was promoted to the Oklahoma City Dodgers during the season.

The Dodgers promoted Ferguson to the major leagues to make his debut as the starting pitcher against the Pittsburgh Pirates on June 6, 2018. He hit the first batter he faced and wound up allowing four runs on three hits, three walks, and two hit batters with three strikeouts in only 1 2/3 innings. He picked up his first MLB win on June 23 against the New York Mets with four scoreless relief innings. Ferguson recorded his first major league save on July 2, against the Pirates, pitching three scoreless innings to end a 17—1 blowout.

Ferguson became a key member of the Dodgers' bullpen in the second half of the season. He had one of the best ERAs of any relievers and threw the highest percentage of pitches in the strike zone of any Dodger reliever. He was 7–2 with a 3.49 ERA in 29 games (three starts). He was effective in the playoffs, allowing no hits or runs in three innings over six appearances, but was left off the World Series roster.

In 2019, Ferguson pitched in 46 games for the Dodgers with a 1–2 record and 4.84 ERA, while making two starts. During the pandemic-shortened 2020 season, Ferguson appeared in 21 games and was 2–1 with a 2.89 ERA. In mid-September, he suffered damage to his ulnar collateral ligament and underwent his second Tommy John surgery. On February 19, 2021, he was placed on the 60-day injured list as he continued to recover from surgery. He rejoined the Dodgers in the 2022 season, where he pitched in 37 games and allowed seven runs in 34 2/3 innings for a 1.82 ERA.

On January 13, 2023, Ferguson agreed to a one-year, $1.1 million contract with the Dodgers, avoiding salary arbitration and he pitched in 68 games (including seven starts as an opener) with a 7–4 record and 3.43 ERA in 2023. He increased his salary to $2.4 million for 2024 in his third time in arbitration.

=== New York Yankees ===
On February 5, 2024, the Dodgers traded Ferguson to the New York Yankees in exchange for Matt Gage and Christian Zazueta. In 42 appearances for the Yankees, Ferguson compiled a 5.13 ERA with 41 strikeouts across 33 1/3 innings of work.

=== Houston Astros ===
On July 30, 2024, the Yankees traded Ferguson to the Houston Astros in exchange for pitcher Kelly Austin and cash. Ferguson made 20 appearances for Houston, going 0–1 with a 3.86 ERA, one home run allowed, and 26 strikeouts in 21 innings. In the American League Wild Card Series (ALWCS), he threw one pitch, with an advancing base runner thrown out at second base ending the inning. Following the season, Ferguson elected free agency.

=== Pittsburgh Pirates ===
On January 10, 2025, Ferguson signed a one-year, $3 million contract with the Pittsburgh Pirates. In 45 appearances for Pittsburgh, Ferguson compiled a 2–2 record and 3.74 ERA with 34 strikeouts across 43 1/3 innings pitched.

=== Seattle Mariners ===
On July 30, 2025, Ferguson was traded to the Seattle Mariners for minor league pitcher Jeter Martinez. As the Mariners' second left-handed reliever, working in lower leverage situations than Gabe Speier, Ferguson had a 3–2 record and 3.27 ERA, throwing 22 innings in 25 games for Seattle.

=== Cincinnati Reds ===
On December 18, 2025, Ferguson signed a one-year, $4.5 million contract with the Cincinnati Reds. He opened the season on the injured list with an oblique strain. He was activated on May 23. Ferguson pitched 24 2/3 innings with the Reds and had a 1-0 record, a 4.01 ERA, and 22 strikeouts.

=== St. Louis Cardinals ===
On August 3, 2026, the Reds traded Ferguson to the St. Louis Cardinals in exchange for international cap space. He appeared in nine games for the Cardinals and pitched to an 8.64 ERA, nine strikeouts, and eight walks over 8 1/3 innings. On August 29, Ferguson was designated for assignment by the Cardinals. The next day, he was released by the team.

== Personal life ==
Ferguson is married and has a child.

Ferguson's father and brother played college football. Ferguson quit football in 9th grade to focus on baseball.
