= Jake Cousins =

American baseball player (born 1994)

Free agent
- Pitcher
- Born: July 14, 1994 (age 32); Park Ridge, Illinois, U.S.
- Bats: Right Throws: Right

MLB debut
- June 21, 2021, for the Milwaukee Brewers

MLB statistics (through 2024 season)
- Win–loss record: 5–2
- Earned run average: 2.78
- Strikeouts: 125
- Stats at Baseball Reference

Teams
- Milwaukee Brewers (2021–2023); New York Yankees (2024)

Jacob Owen Cousins (born July 14, 1994) is an American professional baseball pitcher who is a free agent. He played college baseball for the University of Pennsylvania. He has previously played in Major League Baseball (MLB) for the Milwaukee Brewers and New York Yankees. Cousins was selected by the Washington Nationals in the 20th round of the 2017 MLB draft, and he made his MLB debut in 2021.

== Amateur career ==
Cousins grew up St. Charles, Illinois, and attended Wheaton Academy. In high school, he lettered four times in baseball, including for the school's 2012 league champion baseball team, and twice in basketball for the school's two-time league championship team.

He attended the University of Pennsylvania and played college baseball for the Penn Quakers for four seasons. As a senior, Cousins had a 7–2 win–loss record with a 3.15 earned run average (ERA) and was named unanimous first team All-Ivy League. His all-time collegiate career record was 20–7 with a 2.91 ERA. In 2015, he played collegiate summer baseball for the Harwich Mariners of the Cape Cod Baseball League, pitching seven innings.

== Professional career ==
=== Washington Nationals ===
The Washington Nationals selected Cousins in the 20th round, 613th overall, of the 2017 Major League Baseball draft. He made his professional debut with the rookie-level Gulf Coast League Nationals in 2017, and also played with the Low-A Auburn Doubledays, accumulating a 2–2 record and 2.48 ERA in 18 appearances. He only played in seven games for the GCL Nationals in 2018, posting a 4.09 ERA in 11 innings of work. On March 27, 2019, Cousins was released after suffering an injury.

=== Schaumburg Boomers ===
On May 24, 2019, Cousins signed with the Schaumburg Boomers of the independent Frontier League. Cousins made 15 relief appearances for the Boomers and had a 0.47 ERA with 18 strikeouts.

=== Milwaukee Brewers ===
The Milwaukee Brewers purchased Cousins' contract from Schaumburg on July 17, 2019. After signing with the Brewers, Cousins was assigned to the Arizona League Brewers Blue before being promoted to the Single–A Wisconsin Timber Rattlers. In 14 games between the AZL Brewers and Wisconsin, Cousins posted a cumulative 3–0 record and 1.91 ERA with 39 strikeouts in 28 1/3 innings of work. After the 2020 minor league season was canceled, he returned to independent baseball with permission from the Brewers and signed with the Chicago Dogs of the American Association of Professional Baseball on July 19, 2020. Cousins made 15 appearances with Chicago and finished the season with a 3.38 ERA. He began the 2021 season with the Double-A Biloxi Shuckers and was promoted to the Triple-A Nashville Sounds after eight appearances.

On June 21, 2021, Cousins was selected to the 40-man roster and promoted to the major leagues for the first time. Cousins had logged a 2.55 ERA in 16 games between Biloxi and Nashville prior to his call-up. He made his MLB debut that day, pitching two scoreless innings of relief against the Arizona Diamondbacks. In the game, he notched his first career strikeout, punching out Diamondbacks catcher Stephen Vogt, one of 5 K's on the night. On July 7, Cousins earned his first career win after pitching a scoreless inning in relief against the New York Mets. Cousins did not allow an earned run until his 18th pitching appearance.

On June 2, 2022, Cousins was placed on the 60-day injured list with an ulnar collateral ligament injury in his right elbow. He had turned down Tommy John surgery and received a platelet-rich plasma injection a few weeks earlier. He was activated off of the injured list on August 23 and optioned to Triple–A Nashville.

Cousins was optioned to Triple-A Nashville to begin the 2023 season. In nine games for Milwaukee, he worked to a 4.82 ERA with 7 strikeouts in 9 1/3 innings of work.

=== Houston Astros ===
On July 31, 2023, Cousins was claimed off waivers by the Houston Astros. He struggled to a 9.00 ERA in 8 appearances for the Triple–A Sugar Land Space Cowboys prior to being designated for assignment on August 29. Cousins cleared waivers and was sent outright to Sugar Land on September 1. He elected free agency following the season on November 6.

=== New York Yankees ===
On December 5, 2023, Cousins signed a minor league contract with the Chicago White Sox. On March 31, 2024, the White Sox traded Cousins to the New York Yankees in exchange for cash considerations. The following day, the Yankees selected him to the major league roster. On August 13 against the Chicago White Sox, Cousins recorded his first career save in a 4-1 Yankees win. In 37 appearances for New York, he compiled a 2–1 record and 2.37 ERA with 53 strikeouts over 38 innings of work.

On March 27, 2025, Cousins was placed on the 60-day injured list with a right elbow flexor strain. On June 16, it was announced that Cousins would undergo Tommy John surgery, ending his season. On November 21, he was non-tendered by the Yankees and became a free agent.

=== Los Angeles Dodgers ===
On March 24, 2026, Cousins signed a one-year, $950,000 major league contract with the Los Angeles Dodgers. He spent most of the season recovering from his surgery, before pitching some rehab games for the Triple-A Oklahoma City Comets in September. He pitched 4 1/3 innings over six games for the Comets, allowing five runs. He was designated for assignment on November 17 and then non-tendered and released on November 20.

== Personal life ==
Cousins married his high school sweetheart Kelsey Ridderhoff on December 16, 2017, in Beach Park, Illinois. Jake is a cousin of National Football League quarterback Kirk Cousins. Jake grew up a fan of the Chicago Cubs.
