= Oswaldo Cabrera =

Venezuelan baseball player (born 1999)

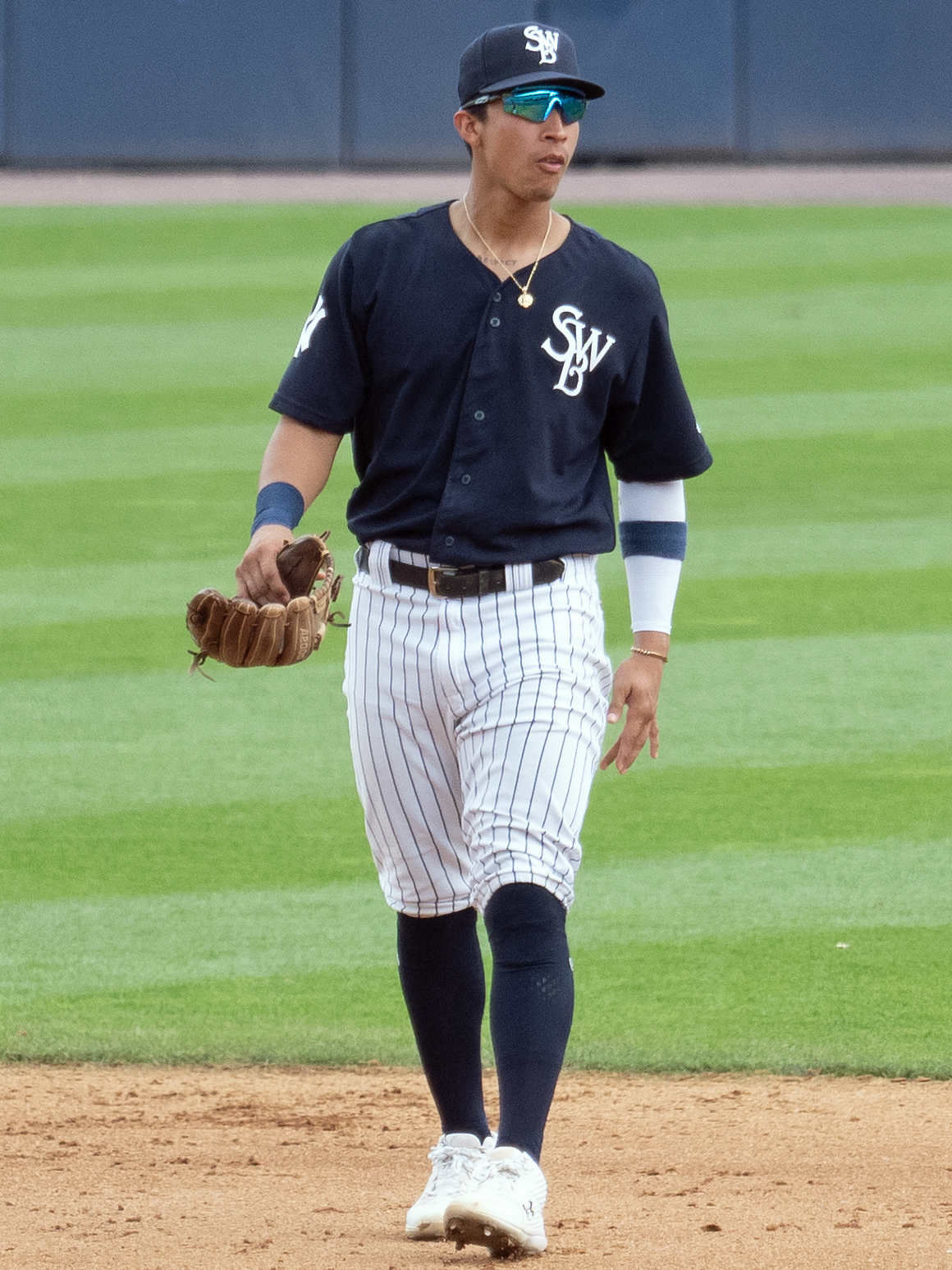
- Cabrera with the Scranton/Wilkes-Barre RailRiders in 2022

Cincinnati Reds – No. 16
- Utility player
- Born: March 1, 1999 (age 27); Guarenas, Venezuela
- Bats: Switch Throws: Right

MLB debut
- August 17, 2022, for the New York Yankees

MLB statistics (through 2026 season)
- Batting average: .233
- Home runs: 20
- Runs batted in: 95
- Stats at Baseball Reference

Teams
- New York Yankees (2022–2026); Cincinnati Reds (2026–present)
Medals
Men's baseball
Representing Venezuela
U-15 Baseball World Cup
Bronze medal – third place	2014 Mazatlán	Team

Oswaldo Alberto Cabrera (born March 1, 1999) is a Venezuelan professional baseball utility player for the Cincinnati Reds of Major League Baseball (MLB). He has previously played in MLB for the New York Yankees. Cabrera signed with the Yankees as a free agent when he was 16 years old, and has appeared at every position in MLB except for catcher.

== Early life ==
Cabrera is from Guarenas in Venezuela. His father, Leobardo, was a professional volleyball player. His brothers, Eleardo and Leobaldo, also played baseball. Cabrera trained at the baseball academy run by Carlos Guillén.

== Career ==
=== New York Yankees ===
==== Minor leagues ====
Cabrera signed with the New York Yankees as a free agent in 2015, when he was 16 years old. He received a signing bonus of $100,000. Cabrera began his professional career in the Dominican Summer League and was promoted to the Gulf Coast League and to the Pulaski Yankees of the Rookie-level Appalachian League during the 2016 season. He played for the Charleston RiverDogs of the Single-A South Atlantic League and Staten Island Yankees of the Single-A Short Season New York-Penn League in 2017. He stayed with Charleston in 2018 before playing for the Tampa Tarpons of the Single-A Advanced Florida State League in 2019.

After the 2020 season was cancelled, Cabrera resumed his career with the Somerset Patriots of Double-A Northeast in 2021; he led the league in hits and runs batted in (RBIs), and was named the league's most valuable player. The Yankees added him to their 40-man roster, protecting him from being eligible to be selected in the Rule 5 draft, after the season. The Yankees optioned Cabrera to the Scranton/Wilkes-Barre RailRiders for the start of the 2022 season.

==== Major leagues ====
The Yankees promoted Cabrera to the major leagues on August 17, 2022, and he made his major league debut that day as the starting third baseman. The following day, he picked up his first major league hit, a double off of Toronto Blue Jays starter José Berríos. In his first six major league games, he also started as a shortstop, second baseman, and right fielder. On September 11, Cabrera hit his first major league home run, against Tampa Bay Rays right-handed pitcher Calvin Faucher at Yankee Stadium. On September 21, Cabrera hit his first grand slam against Pittsburgh Pirates pitcher Roansy Contreras. In his rookie campaign, Cabrera batted .247/.312/.429 in 154 at-bats for the Yankees, with six home runs and 19 RBI. Cabrera began to play as an outfielder in 2022. He played 27 games in right field, nine games in left field, four games at shortstop, and three games each at first base, second base, and third base.

Cabrera started in left field for the Yankees on Opening Day in 2023 and manager Aaron Boone named him their starting left fielder. Cabrera batted .195 in 46 games before the Yankees optioned him to Scranton/Wilkes-Barre on June 1. The Yankees recalled Cabrera on June 3 due to an injury to Greg Allen. He finished the regular season with a .211 average, five home runs and 29 RBIs in 115 games. After the 2023 season, Cabrera played winter ball for the Tiburones de La Guaira of the Venezuelan Professional Baseball League.

Due to an injury to DJ LeMahieu, Cabrera opened the 2024 season as the Yankees' regular third baseman. On March 29, 2024, Cabrera had his first four-hit game in the major leagues. He made 108 appearances for the Yankees, hitting .247/.296/.365 with eight home runs, 36 RBIs, and four stolen bases.

Cabrera (middle) with the Yankees in 2025

Cabrera competed to be the starting third baseman before the 2025 season. On May 12, 2025, Cabrera fractured his left ankle while scoring a run at home plate in the ninth inning of a game against the Seattle Mariners. He was subsequently placed on the 10-day injured list. Cabrera was transferred to the 60-day injured list on June 19.

On March 21, 2026, the Yankees optioned Cabrera to Triple-A Scranton/Wilkes-Barre to begin the regular season. They promoted him to the major leagues on June 24. Cabrera played in three games for the Yankees and 122 games for the RailRiders during the 2026 season before he was designated for assignment on September 16.

=== Cincinnati Reds ===
On September 18, 2026, Cabrera was claimed off waivers by the Cincinnati Reds. Cabrera made his Reds debut on September 20 against the Chicago Cubs. Cincinnati signed Cabrera to a one-year contract for the 2027 season on October 15.
