= Clay Holmes =

American baseball player (born 1993)

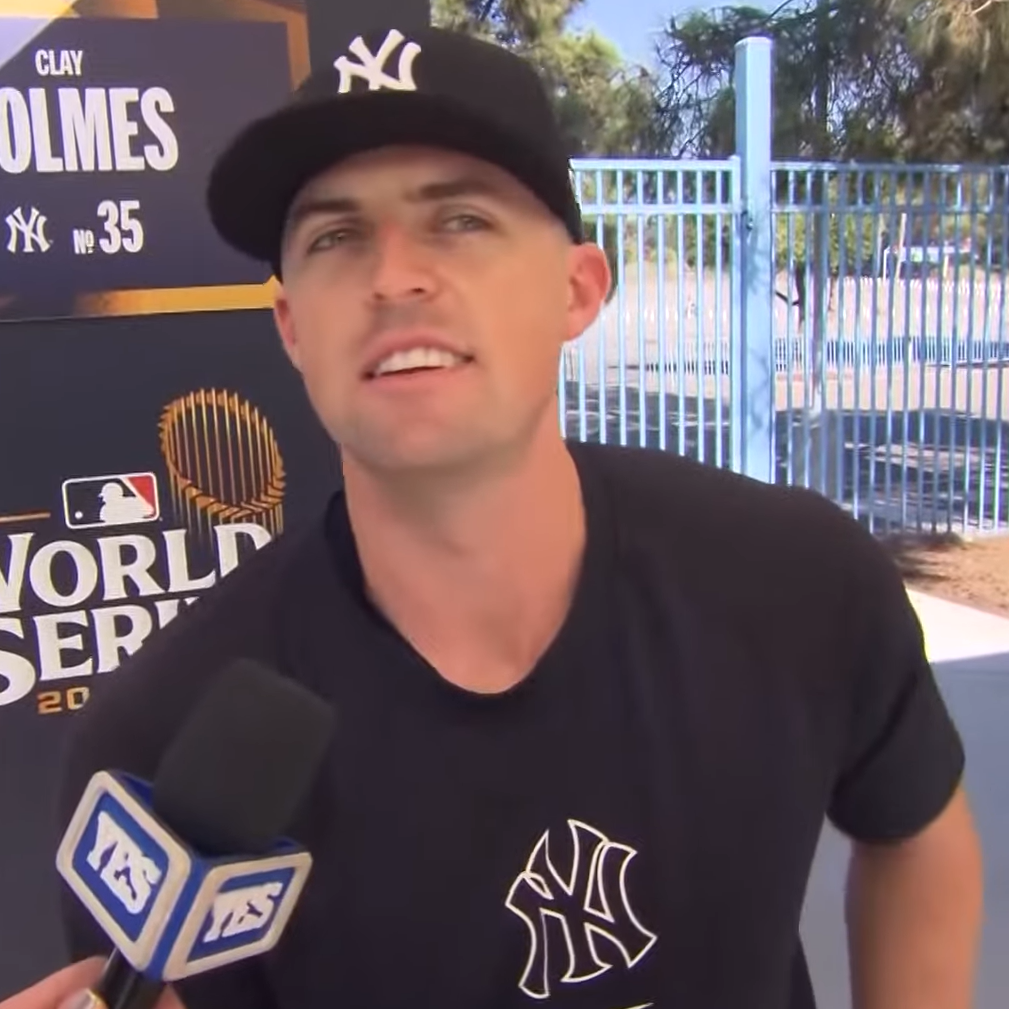
- Holmes with the New York Yankees in 2024

Free agent
- Pitcher
- Born: March 27, 1993 (age 33); Dothan, Alabama, U.S.
- Bats: Right Throws: Right

MLB debut
- April 6, 2018, for the Pittsburgh Pirates

MLB statistics (through 2026 season)
- Win–loss record: 42–38
- Earned run average: 3.59
- Strikeouts: 567
- Saves: 74
- Stats at Baseball Reference

Teams
- Pittsburgh Pirates (2018–2021); New York Yankees (2021–2024); New York Mets (2025–2026); Chicago Cubs (2026)

Career highlights and awards
- 2× All-Star (2022, 2024)
Medals
Men's baseball
Representing United States
World Baseball Classic
Silver medal – second place	2026 Miami	Team

Clayton Walter Holmes (born March 27, 1993) is an American professional baseball pitcher who is a free agent. He has played in Major League Baseball (MLB) Pittsburgh Pirates, New York Yankees, New York Mets, and Chicago Cubs.

The Pirates selected Holmes in the ninth round of the 2011 MLB draft. He made his MLB debut with the Pirates in 2018, and was traded to the Yankees during the 2021 season. Holmes became the Yankees' closer and was an MLB All-Star in 2022 and 2024. After becoming a free agent following the 2024 season, he signed with the Mets to become a starting pitcher.

== Career ==
=== Amateur career ===
Holmes attended Slocomb High School in Slocomb, Alabama, and pitched for the school's baseball team. He committed to attend Auburn University to play college baseball for the Auburn Tigers.

=== Pittsburgh Pirates ===
The Pittsburgh Pirates selected Holmes in the ninth round of the 2011 Major League Baseball draft. He signed with the Pirates, receiving a $1.2 million signing bonus, and forgoing his commitment to Auburn.

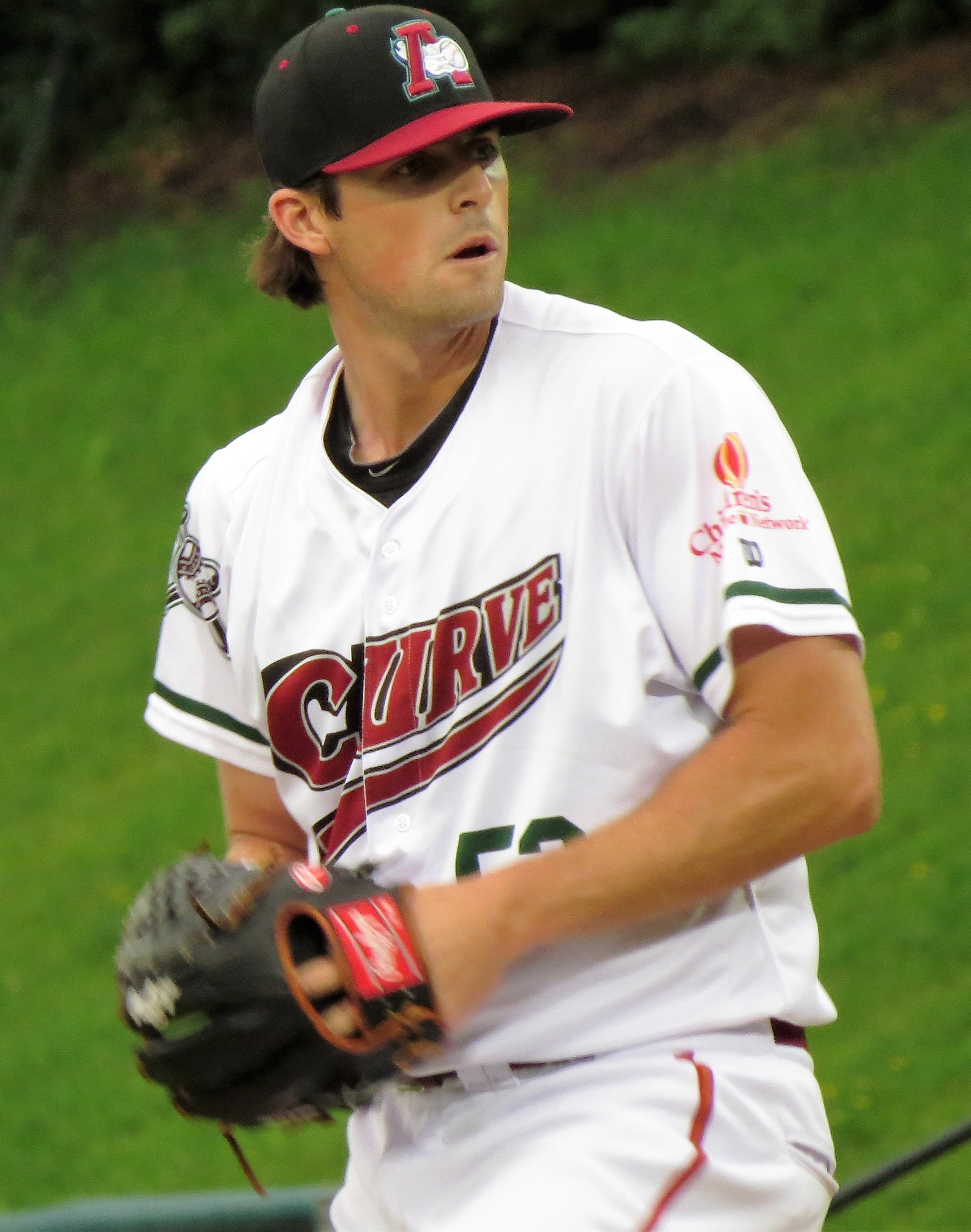
Holmes with the Altoona Curve in 2016

Holmes made his professional debut in 2012 with the State College Spikes and spent the whole season there, going 5–3 with a 2.28 ERA in 13 starts. He spent 2013 with the West Virginia Power where he was 5–6 with a 4.08 ERA in 26 games (25 starts). He underwent Tommy John surgery in 2014 and missed the season. He returned in 2015 and made three rehab starts with the Gulf Coast League Pirates before being assigned to the Bradenton Marauders. In six starts for Bradenton, he struck out 16 batters in 23 innings and compiled a 2.74 ERA. Holmes spent 2016 with the Altoona Curve where he compiled a 10–9 record with a 4.22 ERA in 26 starts.

The Pirates added Holmes to their 40-man roster after the 2016 season. In 2017, he pitched for the Indianapolis Indians where he was 10–5 with a 3.36 ERA in 25 games (24 starts).

Holmes began 2018 with the Indians. Pittsburgh promoted him to the major leagues on April 1 as the 26th man for their doubleheader against the Detroit Tigers, but he did not make an appearance and was optioned back to Indianapolis before being recalled once again on April 2. He made his major league debut on April 6 against the Cincinnati Reds, pitching two innings in which he gave up one run on two hits while striking out two and walking none. He was optioned to Indianapolis on April 13. In 2019 for Pittsburgh, Holmes registered a 5.58 ERA with 10.1 K/9 in 50 innings out of the bullpen.

In 2020 for the Pirates, Holmes only appeared in one game, pitching 1 1/3 scoreless innings against the St. Louis Cardinals in the season opener before being placed on the injured list on July 28 due to a right forearm strain and missing the remainder of the season. On December 2, Holmes was non-tendered by the Pirates. Holmes re-signed with the Pirates on a minor league contract on December 4.

On April 1, 2021, Holmes was selected to the 40-man roster. In 44 appearances for the Pirates, he pitched to a 4.93 ERA with 44 strikeouts in 42 innings.

=== New York Yankees ===
On July 26, 2021, the Pirates traded Holmes to the New York Yankees in exchange for Diego Castillo and Hoy Park. He made his Yankee debut against the Tampa Bay Rays, shutting down the batters in order. He posted a 1.61 ERA, 34 strikeouts and 0.79 WHIP in 28 innings with his new team. Overall, Holmes finished the season with an ERA of 3.60, a WHIP of 1.17 while striking out 78 batters in 70 innings. He was named American League Reliever of the Month in May, allowing no runs in 12 appearances.

Holmes became the team's closer in May 2022, when Aroldis Chapman went on the injured list. Holmes notched his 29th consecutive game without allowing a run on June 18, setting a new Yankees franchise record for consecutive scoreless appearances, breaking Mariano Rivera's record set in 1999. At that point, he had a 0.28 ERA in 32 innings. Holmes was one of six Yankees selected to the 2022 MLB All-Star Game. For the 2022 season, he had a 2.54 ERA and converted 20 saves in 25 chances.

Holmes finished the 2023 season with a 2.66 ERA and 24 saves in 27 chances.

In the 2024 season, Holmes did not give up an earned run until May 20, his 21st appearance of the year. He was named an All-Star for the second time. Holmes struggled midseason and was removed from the closer role after giving up a walk-off grand slam to the Texas Rangers on September 3, his MLB-leading 11th blown save of the season. He ended the season with a 3.14 ERA, 1.30 WHIP, 68 strikeouts, 30 saves and an MLB-high 13 blown saves.

=== New York Mets ===
On December 9, 2024, Holmes signed a three-year, $38 million contract with the New York Mets including an opt-out after the 2026 season. Plans were announced to convert him into a starting pitcher. After injuries to other pitchers, Holmes was named the Mets' Opening Day starter for the 2025 season. Holmes finished the year with a 12-8 record and 3.53 ERA and 129 strikeouts across 165 2/3 innings pitched.

On May 15, 2026, while facing his former team, the New York Yankees, Holmes was hit in the right leg by a comebacker and left the game, which ended up being his final game as a Met. It was later revealed that his right leg had suffered a fractured fibula, which ruled him out for 6-to-8 weeks. Before this point, Holmes pitched to a 2.39 ERA with 45 strikeouts across nine starts.

=== Chicago Cubs ===
On August 3, 2026, the Mets traded Holmes and Tyrone Taylor to the Chicago Cubs in exchange for Jefferson Rojas. On August 8, Holmes was activated from the injured list for his team debut. Holmes started nine games for the Cubs to close out the season, pitching to a 4.25 ERA with 33 strikeouts. Between the Mets and Cubs, Holmes started 18 games and pitched to a 3.29 ERA with 78 strikeouts. He did not pitch during the 2026 NL Wild Card Series as the Cubs were swept in two games. On November 2, Holmes declined his player option and became a free agent.
