= Duke Ellis =

American baseball player (born 1998)

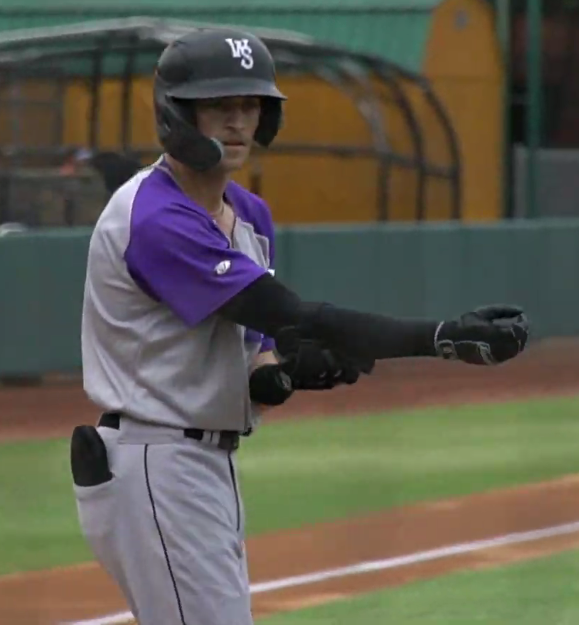
- Ellis with the Winston-Salem Dash in 2022

Free agent
- Outfielder
- Born: January 16, 1998 (age 28); Nacogdoches, Texas, U.S.
- Bats: Left Throws: Left

MLB debut
- June 4, 2024, for the Chicago White Sox

MLB statistics (through 2024 season)
- Batting average: .200
- Home runs: 0
- Runs batted in: 0
- Stolen bases: 5
- Stats at Baseball Reference

Teams
- Chicago White Sox (2024); New York Yankees (2024)

Robert Duke Ellis (born January 16, 1998) is an American professional baseball outfielder who is a free agent. He has previously played in Major League Baseball (MLB) for the Chicago White Sox.

== Amateur career ==
Ellis graduated from Central Heights High School in Nacogdoches, Texas, in 2016. He enrolled at Panola College for his freshman year and began his college baseball career. After one year at Panola, the San Diego Padres selected Ellis in the 20th round, with the 588th overall selection, of the 2017 Major League Baseball draft, but did not sign. Ellis transferred to the University of Texas at Austin to play for the Texas Longhorns. In 2019, he played collegiate summer baseball with the Brewster Whitecaps and Cotuit Kettleers of the Cape Cod Baseball League.

== Professional career ==
=== Chicago White Sox ===
Ellis was not selected in the 2020 MLB draft and signed with the Chicago White Sox as an undrafted free agent on June 19, 2020. He did not play in a game in 2020 due to the cancellation of the minor league season because of the COVID-19 pandemic.

Ellis made his professional debut in 2021 with the High–A Winston-Salem Dash, playing in 73 games and hitting .200/.274/.277 with four home runs, 18 RBI, and 23 stolen bases. He spent the 2022 season back with Winston-Salem, and received a late–season cup of coffee with the Double–A Birmingham Barons. In 100 games for the Dash, Ellis hit .273/.360/.390 with career–highs in home runs (7), RBI (27), and stolen bases (50).

Ellis played in only 16 games for Double–A Birmingham in 2023 due to injury troubles, and hit .157 with four RBI. He began the 2024 campaign with Birmingham, batting .258/.341/.308 with one home run, 12 RBI, and 34 stolen bases across 39 appearances.

On June 4, 2024, Ellis was selected to the 40-man roster and promoted to the major leagues for the first time. He made his Major League debut that day, in a game against the Chicago Cubs. In the ninth inning, he entered the game as a pinch runner, replacing Oscar Colás. On the next pitch, he earned his first career stolen base with a steal of second. However, he would end up being picked-off at second base by the Cubs’ pitcher, Héctor Neris. In eight games for Chicago, he went 0–for–4 with four stolen bases. Ellis was designated for assignment by the White Sox on June 16.

=== New York Mets ===
On June 21, 2024, Ellis was claimed off waivers by the New York Mets. He played in two games for the Double–A Binghamton Rumble Ponies prior to being designated for assignment on June 30.

=== Seattle Mariners ===
On July 4, 2024, Ellis was claimed off waivers by the Seattle Mariners. In 32 games for the Triple–A Tacoma Rainiers, he hit .212/.291/.385 with four home runs, 20 RBI, and 17 stolen bases. Ellis was designated for assignment on August 23.

=== New York Yankees ===
On August 26, 2024, Ellis was claimed off waivers by the New York Yankees. On September 4, against the Texas Rangers at Globe Life Field, he recorded his first major league hit, a single to left field. In 3 total games for the Yankees, he went 1–for–1 with a stolen base. On November 4, Ellis was removed from the 40–man roster and sent outright to the Triple–A Scranton/Wilkes-Barre RailRiders.

In 2026, he played in 99 games with Triple-A Scranton/Wilkes-Barre Railriders he batted .276/.341/.397 with 5 home runs, 26 RBIs and 60 stolen bases. He elected free agency on November 2.

== Personal life ==
Ellis' father Robert, pitched in Major League Baseball from 1996 to 2003.
