= Josh Maciejewski =

American baseball player (born 1995)

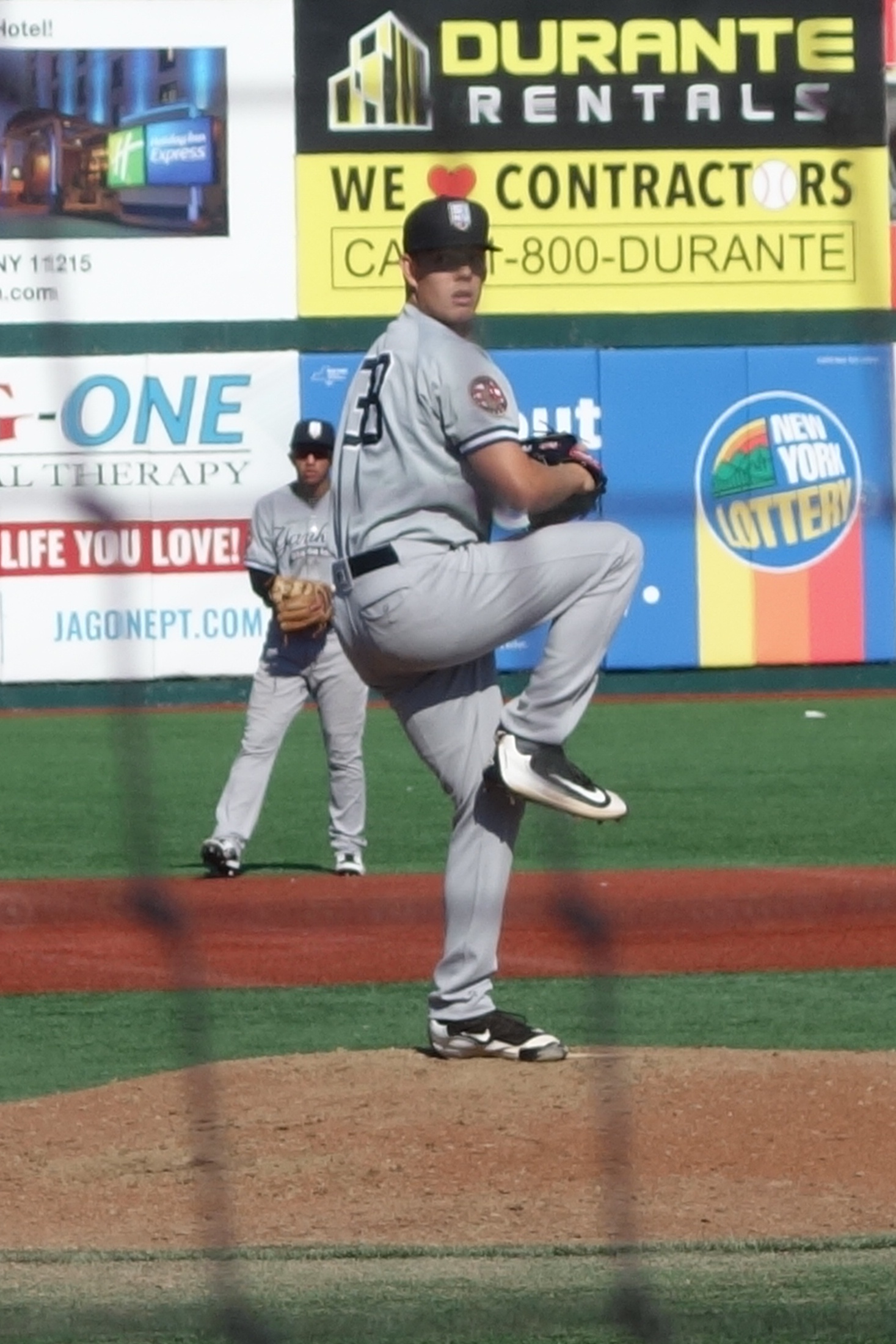
- Maciejewski with the Staten Island Yankees in 2019.

Free agent
- Pitcher
- Born: August 14, 1995 (age 31); Morrisville, North Carolina, U.S.
- Bats: Right Throws: Left

MLB debut
- April 8, 2024, for the New York Yankees

MLB statistics (through 2024 season)
- Win–loss record: 0–0
- Earned run average: 2.57
- Strikeouts: 7
- Stats at Baseball Reference

Teams
- New York Yankees (2024)

Josh Graham Maciejewski (mah-shih-yev-ski, born August 14, 1995) is an American professional baseball pitcher who is a free agent. He has previously played in Major League Baseball (MLB) for the New York Yankees. He made his MLB debut in 2024.

== Career ==
=== Amateur career ===
Maciejewski attended Panther Creek High School in Cary, North Carolina, graduating in 2014. He then enrolled at the University of North Carolina at Charlotte, where he played college baseball for the Charlotte 49ers.

=== New York Yankees ===
The New York Yankees drafted him in the 10th round, with the 307th overall selection, of the 2018 Major League Baseball draft. He split his first professional season between the rookie–level Gulf Coast League Yankees and Low–A Staten Island Yankees, recording a combined 4.18 ERA in 18 total games.

Maciejewski split the 2019 season between Staten Island, the Single–A Charleston RiverDogs, High–A Tampa Tarpons, and Triple–A Scranton/Wilkes-Barre RailRiders. In 14 games (12 starts) split between the four affiliates, he accumulated a 4–5 record and 2.33 ERA with 54 strikeouts across 73 1/3 innings pitched. Maciejewski did not play in a game in 2020 due to the cancellation of the minor league season because of the COVID-19 pandemic.

He returned to action in 2021, making 22 appearances (17 starts) split between Scranton and the High–A Hudson Valley Renegades, in which he pitched to a 9–6 record and 4.53 ERA with 105 strikeouts across 101 1/3 innings pitched. In 2022, the Yankees transitioned Maciejewski from a starting pitcher to a relief pitcher. He spent the year primarily with the Double–A Somerset Patriots, and compiled a 2.88 ERA with 48 strikeouts in 14 games for the team.

Maciejewski split the 2023 campaign between High–A Hudson Valley, Double–A Somerset, and Triple–A Scranton. In 30 appearances out of the bullpen, he combined for a 6–3 record and 2.96 ERA with 46 strikeouts across 45 2/3 innings of work.

On April 8, 2024, Maciejewski was selected to the 40-man roster and promoted to the major leagues for the first time. He made his debut that night, recording three outs on just four pitches. On April 13, Maciejewski was designated for assignment. Maciejewski cleared waivers and was sent outright to Triple–A on April 16. On June 30, the Yankees purchased Maciejewski's contract, adding him back to the major league roster. In 4 appearances for the Yankees, he logged a 2.57 ERA with 7 strikeouts over 7 innings. On September 1, the Yankees designated Maciejewski for assignment. He cleared waivers and was sent outright to Scranton on September 6. Maciejewski elected free agency on October 31.

=== Milwaukee Brewers ===
On January 31, 2025, Maciejewski signed a minor league contract with the Milwaukee Brewers. He made 35 appearances (six starts) for the Double-A Biloxi Shuckers and Triple-A Nashville Sounds, accumulating a 5-5 record and 5.30 ERA with 66 strikeouts across 69 2/3 innings pitched. Maciejewski elected free agency following the season on November 6.

=== Dorados de Chihuahua ===
On April 14, 2026, Maciejewski signed with the Dorados de Chihuahua of the Mexican League. He made six appearances for Chihuahua, recording a 5.79 ERA with five strikeouts across 4 2/3 innings pitched. On May 1, Maciejewski was released on by the Dorados.
